= 58th Grand Bell Awards =

2022 edition of award ceremony

- Official poster
- Date: December 9, 2022
- Site: New Millennium Hall, Konkuk University, Seoul, South Korea
- Hosted by: Kim Tae-hoon; Kang Na-yeon

Highlights
- Best Film: Decision to Leave
- Best Director: Byun Sung-hyun; Kingmaker
- Best Actor: Park Hae-il; Decision to Leave
- Best Actress: Yum Jung-ah; Life Is Beautiful
- Best Supporting Actor: Byun Yo-han; Hansan: Rising Dragon
- Best Supporting Actress: Lim Yoona; Confidential Assignment 2: International
- Most nominations: Hunt (12)

Television coverage
- Network: ENA; YouTube; Twitter

The 58th Grand Bell Awards (Korean: 제58회 대종상 영화제; RR: Daejongsang Yeonghwajae), also known as Daejong International Film Awards, is determined and presented annually by The Motion Pictures Association of Korea for excellence in film in South Korea. The Grand Bell Awards were first presented in 1962 and have gained prestige as the Korean equivalent of the American Academy Awards. The 58th Daejong International Film Festival was originally scheduled to be held in mid-June, but was postponed for December 2022. The ceremony was held at the New Millennium Hall, Konkuk University in Seoul on December 9, 2022. Hosted by Kim Tae-hoon and Kang Na-yeon, it was aired live on ENA, YouTube and Twitter.

== Judge ==
List of seven additional judges appointed by the Korean Film Association.

- Yim Soon-rye, Director
- Bae Jong-ok, Actress
- Kim Seon-ah, Professor
- Tae Bo-ra; Professor
- Park Jong-won, Director
- Yang Dong-geun, Actor

7 senior judges and 4 former judges

- Bang Soon-jung, President of the Korean Writers' Association
- Lee Jin-young, President of the Korean Film Actors Association
- Kim Ki-tae, President of the Korean Filmmakers Association
- Kang Dae-young, President of the Korean Society of Cinematographers

== Winners and nominees ==
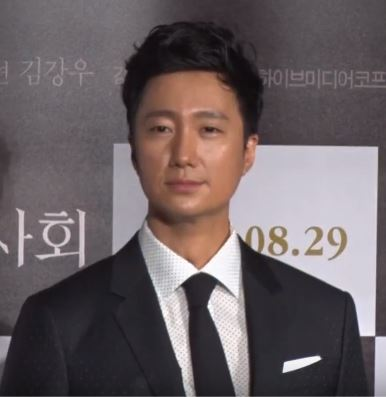
Park Hae-il, Best Actor

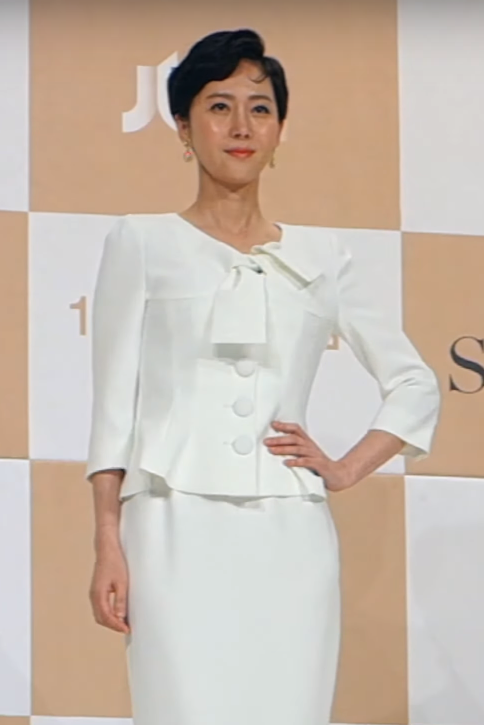
Yum Jung-ah, Best Actress

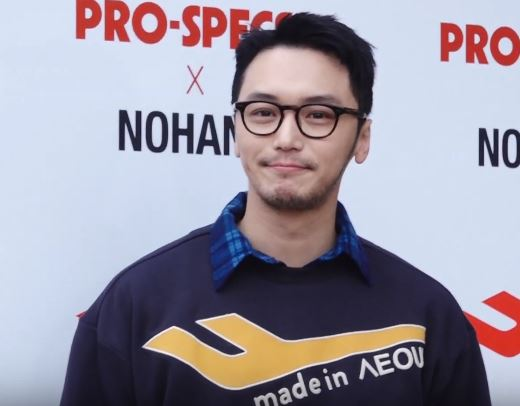
Byun Yo-han, Best Supporting Actor

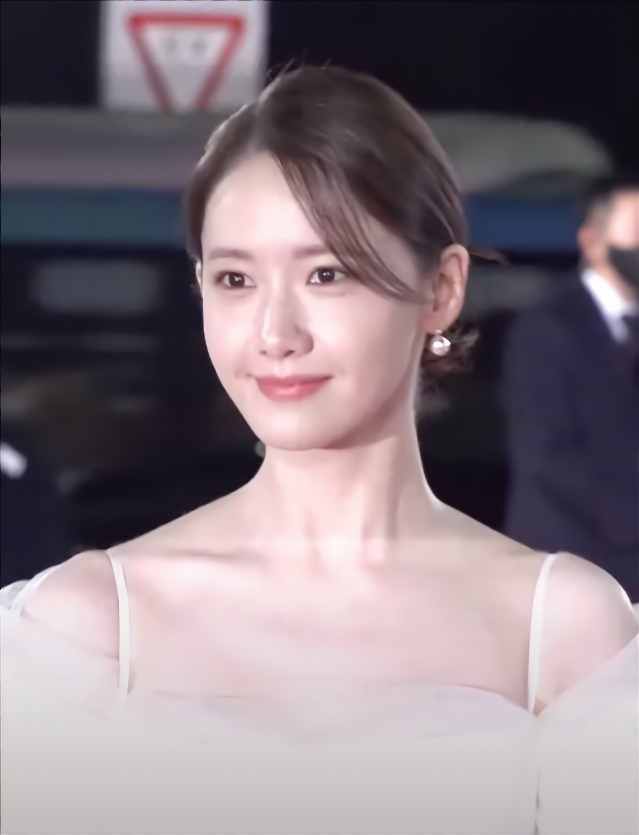
Lim Yoona, Best Supporting Actress

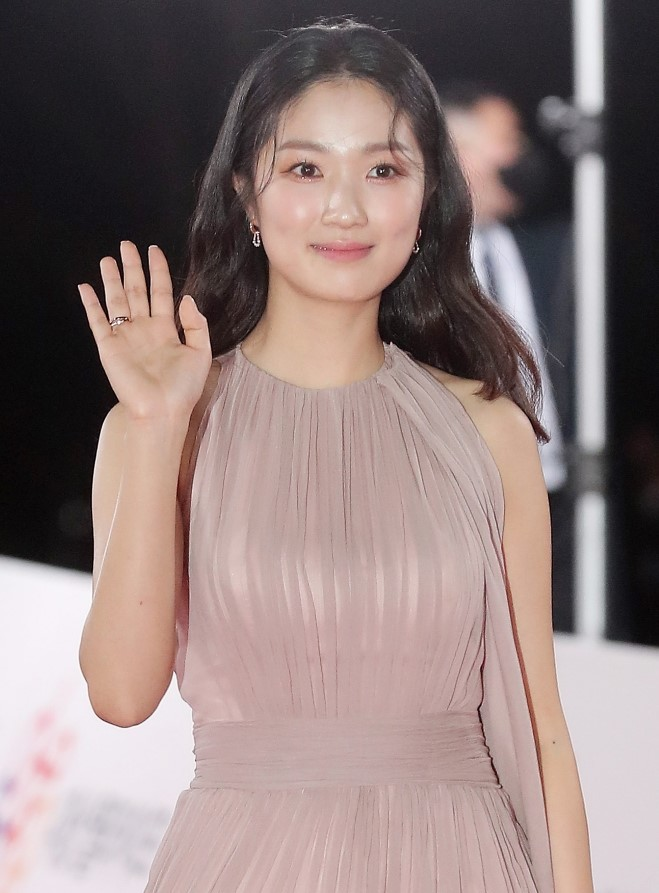
Kim Hye-yoon, Best New Actress

The nominees for the 58th Grand Bell Awards were announced on 12 October 2022, nominations were eligible for films released in South Korea from October 1, 2021, to September 30, 2022.

Winners are listed first, highlighted in boldface, and indicated with a double dagger (‡).

- (Winners denoted in **bold**)

**Best Film**	**Best Director**
**Decision to Leave**‡; Hunt; Kingmaker; Hansan: Rising Dragon; Broker	**Byun Sung-hyun – Kingmaker**‡; Park Chan-wook – Decision to Leave; Lee Jung-jae – Hunt; Kim Han-min – Hansan: Rising Dragon; Shin Su-won – Hommage; Hong Sang-soo – In Front of Your Face
**Best Actor**	**Best Actress**
**Park Hae-il – Decision to Leave as Hae-jun**‡; Sul Kyung-gu – Kingmaker as Kim Woon-beom; Song Kang-ho – Broker as Sang-hyeon; Lee Jung-jae – Hunt as Park Pyong-ho; Jung Woo-sung – Hunt as Kim Jung-do; Lee Byung-hun – Emergency Declaration as Park Jae-hyuk; Ryu Seung-ryong – Life Is Beautiful as Kang Jin-bong	**Yum Jung-ah – Life Is Beautiful as Oh Se-yeon**‡; Tang Wei – Decision to Leave as Seo-rae; Lee Hye-young – In Front of Your Face as Sang-ok; Lee Jung-eun – Hommage as Ji-wan; Park So-dam – Special Delivery as Eun-ha
**Best Supporting Actor**	**Best Supporting Actress**
**Byun Yo-han – Hansan: Rising Dragon as Wakisaka**‡; Park Ji-hwan – The Roundup as Jang I-soo; Jo Woo-jin – Kingmaker as Director Lee; Son Suk-ku – The Roundup as Kang Hae-sang; Im Si-wan – Emergency Declaration as Ryu Jin-seok; Kim Hee-won – Perhaps Love as Soon-mo	**Lim Yoona – Confidential Assignment 2: International as Park Min-young**‡; Oh Na-ra – Perhaps Love as Mi-ae; Jeon Hye-jin – Hunt as Bang Joo-kyung; Kim Hyang-gi – Hansan: Rising Dragon as Jeong Bo-reum; Gong Min-jeung – Nothing Serious as Seon-bin; Lim Ji-yeon - Spiritwalker as Moon Jin-ah
**Best New Actor**	**Best New Actress**
**Mu Jin-sung – Perhaps Love as Yoo-jin** ‡; Kim Dong-hwi – In Our Prime as Han Ji-woo; Tang Jun-sang – Hommage as Ji-wan's son; Lee Hong-nae – Hot Blooded as Ah-mi; Ong Seong-wu – Life Is Beautiful as Jung-woo	**Kim Hye-yoon – The Girl on a Bulldozer as Goo Hye-young** ‡; Shin Si-ah – The Witch: Part 2. The Other One as the girl "Ark 1 Datum point"; Lee Ji-eun – Broker as So-young; Jo Yun-seo – In Our Prime as Park Bo-ram; Park Se-wan – 6/45 as Ri Yeon-hee; Go Youn-jung – Hunt as Jo Yoo-jeong
**Best New Director**	**Best Screenplay**
**Park Yi-woong - The Girl on a Bulldozer**‡; Jo Eun-ji – Perhaps Love; Lee Sang-yong – The Roundup; Lee Jung-jae – Hunt; Namkoong Sun – Ten Months; Lee Ran-hee – A Leave	**Park Chan-wook, Jeong Seo-kyeong – Decision to Leave**‡; Lee Jung-jae, Jo Seung-Hee – Hunt; Kim Han-min, Yun Hong-gi – Hansan: Rising Dragon; Byun Sung-Hyun, Kim Min-soo – Kingmaker; Park Gyu-tae – 6/45
**Best Cinematography**	**Best Film Editing**
**Ju Seong-rim – The Roundup**‡; Kim Ji-yong – Decision to Leave; Lee Mo-gae – Hunt; Kim Tae-seong – Hansan: Rising Dragon; Lee Mo-gae, Park Jong-Chul – Emergency Declaration	**Kim Seon-min – The Roundup**‡; Kim Sang-beom – Decision to Leave; Kim Sang-beom – Hunt; Lee Kang-hee, Ahn Hyun-gun – Hansan: Rising Dragon; Kim Woo-hyun, Lee Kang-il – Emergency Declaration; Shin Min-kyung – Alien+Human Part 1
**Best Art Direction**	**Best Lighting**
**Ryu Seong-hui, Lee Ha-jun – Alien+Human Part 1**‡; Ryu Seong-hui – Decision to Leave; Park Il-hyun – Hunt; Park Gyu-bin – Hansan: Rising Dragon; Lee Mok-won – Emergency Declaration; Han Ah-reum– Kingmaker	**Lee Seong-hwan – Hunt**‡; Shin Sang-yeol – Decision to Leave; Kim Gyeong-seok – Hansan: Rising Dragon; Lee Seong-hwan – Emergency Declaration; Lee Gil-gyu– Kingmaker
**Best Costume Design**	**Best Music**
**Kwon Yoo-jin, Lim Seung-hee – Hansan: Rising Dragon**‡; Kwak Jeong-ae – Decision to Leave; Jo Sang-kyung, Choi Yun-seon – Hunt; Kwon Yoo-jin, Lee Ae-ran – The Pirates: The Last Royal Treasure; Jo Sang-kyung – Alien+Human Part 1; Jo Hee-ran– Kingmaker; Choi Se-yeon – Life Is Beautiful	**Kim Joon-seok – Life Is Beautiful**‡; Jo Yeong-wook – Decision to Leave; Jo Yeong-wook – Hunt; Lee Byung-woo, Jung Ji-hoon – Emergency Declaration; Jang Young-gyu – Alien+Human Part 1; Mowg - The Witch: Part 2. The Other One
**Best Visual Effects**	**Documentary Award**
**Je Gal-seung – Alien+Human Part 1**‡; Lee Seong-min – The Pirates: The Last Royal Treasure; Jung Seong-jin – Hansan: Rising Dragon; Hong Jung-ho – Emergency Declaration; Jo Young-seok, Jang Min-jae - The Witch: Part 2. The Other One	**Lee Il-ha – I Am More**‡; Lee Hyung-rae, Kim Jung-young – Sewing Sisters; Oh Se-yeon – Fanatic; Kim Oh-an – The Man Who Paints Water Drops; Byun Gyu-ri - Coming to You
**Daejong's Expected Award**	**Series Film Director Award**
**Shin Su-won - Hommage**‡; Lee Eun, Shin Jae-myung – Chun Tae-il; Ahn Jae-hoon – The Shaman Sorceress; Kim Su-jeong – Semantic Error: The Movie; Kim Dong-ryeong, Park Kyung-tae – The Pregnant Tree And The Goblin; Lee Ran-hee - A Leave	**Lee Joo-young – Anna**‡
**New Wave Award**	**People's Choice Award**
**Ong Seong-wu – Life Is Beautiful**‡; **Park Jae-chan – Semantic Error: The Movie** ‡; **Park Se-wan – 6/45**‡; **Jo Yun-seo – In Our Prime**‡	**Oh Na-ra – Perhaps Love**‡; **Park Ji-hwan – The Roundup**‡
**Lifetime Achievement Award**
**Ahn Sung-ki**‡

=== Films with multiple nominations ===
The following films received multiple nominations:

Nominations	Films
14	Hunt
11	Decision to Leave
11	Hansan: Rising Dragon
8	Emergency Declaration
8	Kingmaker
5	Alien+Human Part 1
5	The Roundup
5	Life Is Beautiful
4	Perhaps Love
3	Broker
3	Hommage
3	The Witch: Part 2. The Other One
2	6/45
2	The Girl on a Bulldozer
2	In Our Prime
2	The Pirates: The Last Royal Treasure

== See also ==
- 58th Baeksang Arts Awards
- Chunsa Film Art Awards 2022
- 31st Buil Film Awards
- 43rd Blue Dragon Film Awards
