= 43rd Blue Dragon Film Awards =

2022 edition of award ceremony

- Official poster
- Awarded for: Excellence in cinematic achievements
- Awarded by: Sports Chosun
- Announced on: November 8, 2022
- Presented on: November 25, 2022
- Site: KBS Hall, Yeouido, Seoul
- Hosted by: Kim Hye-soo; Yoo Yeon-seok
- Organized by: Sports Chosun (a sister brand of The Chosun Ilbo)
- Official website: 2022

Highlights
- Best Film: Decision to Leave
- Popular Star Award: Go Kyung-pyo; Lee Ji-eun; Daniel Henney; Lim Yoona
- Best Director: Park Chan-wook; Decision to Leave
- Best Actor: Park Hae-il; Decision to Leave
- Best Actress: Tang Wei; Decision to Leave
- Most awards: Decision to Leave (7)
- Most nominations: Decision to Leave (13)

Television coverage
- Network: KBS; YouTube; Naver Now
- Duration: 135 minutes
- Viewership: 1,201,000 People; Ratings: 6.4%

The 43rd Blue Dragon Film Awards (Korean: 제43회 청룡영화상) ceremony was held on November 25, 2022, at KBS Hall in Yeouido, Seoul. Organized by Sports Chosun (a sister brand of Chosun Ilbo). It aired live on KBS2. 18 categories were awarded at the 43rd edition of awards ceremony, hosted by Kim Hye-soo (29th time) and Yoo Yeon-seok (5th time). The nominations for 15 categories were announced for the Korean films released from October 15, 2021 to October 30, 2022 on November 8, 2022, Decision to Leave got 13 nominations in 13 categories, and won 7 awards including Best Film, Best Director, Best Actor, Best Actress, Best Screenplay, Best Music, and Popular Star Awards.

== Nominees and winners ==
The nominees for the 43rd Blue Dragon Film Awards were announced on November 8, 2022.

Winners are listed first, highlighted in boldface, and indicated with a double dagger (‡).

- (Winners denoted in **bold**)

**Best Film**	**Best Director**
**Decision to Leave ‡**; Hunt; Kingmaker; Hansan: Rising Dragon; Broker	**Park Chan-wook – Decision to Leave ‡**; Byun Sung-hyun – Kingmaker; Lee Jung-jae – Hunt; Kim Han-min – Hansan: Rising Dragon; Han Jae-rim – Emergency Declaration; Hirokazu Kore-eda – Broker
**Best Actor**	**Best Actress**
**Park Hae-il – Decision to Leave as Jang Hae-jun ‡**; Sul Kyung-gu – Kingmaker as Kim Woon-beom; Lee Jung-jae – Hunt as Park Pyong-ho; Song Kang-ho – Broker as Ha Sang-hyeon; Jung Woo-sung – Hunt as Kim Jung-do; Lee Byung-hun – Emergency Declaration as Park Jae-hyuk	**Tang Wei – Decision to Leave as Seo-rae ‡**; Yum Jung-ah – Life Is Beautiful as Oh Se-yeon; Lim Yoona – Confidential Assignment 2: International as Park Min-young; Chun Woo-hee – Anchor as Jung Se-ra; Park So-dam – Special Delivery as Eun-ha
**Best Supporting Actor**	**Best Supporting Actress**
**Byun Yo-han – Hansan: Rising Dragon as Wakisaka ‡**; Im Si-wan – Emergency Declaration as Ryu Jin-seok; Go Kyung-pyo – Decision to Leave as Soo-wan; Park Ji-hwan – The Roundup as Jang I-soo; Daniel Henney – Confidential Assignment 2: International as Jack	**Oh Na-ra – Perhaps Love as Mi-ae ‡**; Lee Jung-hyun – Decision to Leave as Jung-an; Jeon Hye-jin – Hunt as Bang Joo-kyung; Kim So-jin – Emergency Declaration as Hee-jin; Seo Eun-soo - The Witch: Part 2. The Other One as Jo-hyun
**Best New Actor**	**Best New Actress**
**Kim Dong-hwi – In Our Prime as Han Ji-woo ‡**; Mu Jin-sung – Perhaps Love as Yoo-jin; Seo In-guk – Project Wolf Hunting as Park Jong-doo; Lee Seo-jun – Hansan: Rising Dragon as Sahee; Ong Seong-wu – Life Is Beautiful as Jung-woo	**Kim Hye-yoon – The Girl on a Bulldozer as Goo Hye-young ‡**; Shin Si-ah – The Witch: Part 2. The Other One as the girl "Ark 1 Datum point"; Lee Ji-eun – Broker as So-young; Kim Shin-young – Decision to Leave as Yeon-su; Go Youn-jung – Hunt as Jo Yoo-jeong
**Best New Director**	**Best Screenplay**
**Lee Jung-jae – Hunt ‡**; Jo Eun-ji – Perhaps Love; Lee Sang-yong – The Roundup; Jung Ji-yeon – Anchor; Park Yi-woong - The Girl on a Bulldozer	**Park Chan-wook, Jeong Seo-kyeong – Decision to Leave ‡**; Lee Jung-jae, Jo Seung-Hee – Hunt; Kim Han-min, Yun Hong-gi – Hansan: Rising Dragon; Byun Sung-Hyun, Kim Min-soo – Kingmaker; Hirokazu Kore-eda – Broker
**Best Editing**	**Best Cinematography and Lighting**
**Kim Sang-beom – Hunt ‡**; Kim Sang-beom – Decision to Leave; Lee Kang-hee, Ahn Hyun-gun – Hansan: Rising Dragon; Kim Sang-beom – Kingmaker; Kim Seon-min – The Roundup	**Lee Mo-gae, Lee Sung-hwan – Hunt ‡**; Kim Ji-yong, Shin Sang-yeol – Decision to Leave; Kim Tae-seong, Kim Kyung-seok – Hansan: Rising Dragon; Jo Hyung-rae, Lee Gil-gyu – Kingmaker; Hong Kyung-pyo, Park Jeong-woo – Broker
**Technical Award**	**Best Art Direction**
**Huh Myung-haeng, Yoon Seong-min – The Roundup (martial arts) ‡**; Kwak Jeong-ae – Decision to Leave (Costume); Jeong Seong-jin, Jeong Cheol-min – Hansan: Rising Dragon (VFX); Hong Jeong-ho – Emergency Declaration (VFX); Jegal Seung – Alien+Human Part 1 (VFX)	**Han Ah-reum – Kingmaker ‡**; Ryu Seong-hee – Decision to Leave; Park Il-hyun – Hunt; Park Gyu-bin – Hansan: Rising Dragon; Son Min-jung, Kim Young-bok – Life Is Beautiful
**Best Music**	**Chung Jung-won Best Short Film**
**Jo Yeong-wook – Decision to Leave ‡**; Jo Yeong-wook – Hunt; Kim Tae-seong – Hansan: Rising Dragon; Jung Jae-il – Broker; Kim Joon-seok – Life Is Beautiful	**Light It Up at 2 AM ‡**; Goot; Beep; I'm Not a Robot; Teatime with Mr.Park; Other Life; When You Grow Up
**Chung Jung-won Popular Star Award**	**Audience Choice Award for Most Popular Film**
**Go Kyung-pyo ‡**; **Lee Ji-eun ‡**; **Daniel Henney ‡**; **Lim Yoona ‡**	**The Roundup ‡**; Hansan: Rising Dragon (2nd); Confidential Assignment 2: International (3rd); Hunt (4th); The Witch: Part 2. The Other One (5th)

== Films with multiple nominations and awards ==
The following films received multiple nominations and awards:

Films with multiple nominations
Nominations	Films
13	Decision to Leave
10	Hansan: Rising Dragon
10	Hunt
7	Broker
7	Kingmaker
5	Emergency Declaration
4	Life is Beautiful
4	The Roundup
3	Perhaps Love
2	Anchor
2	Confidential Assignment 2: International
2	The Girl on a Bulldozer
2	The Witch: Part 2. The Other One

Films with multiple awards
Wins	Films
7	Decision to Leave
3	Hunt
2	The Roundup
2	Confidential Assignment 2: International

== Presenters ==
Presenter(s)	Award(s)	Ref.
Jung Jae-kwang and Lee Yoo-mi	Best New Actor	
Gong Seung-yeon and Ok Taec-yeon	Best New Actress	
Chun Woo-hee and Lee Hyun-woo	Best New Director	
Park Ji-hwan and Jin Seon-kyu	Audience Choice Award for Most Popular Film	
Yoon Shi-yoon and Kang So-ra	Chung Jung-won Best Short Film	
Kim Hye-soo and Yoo Yeon-seok	Chung Jung-won Popular Star Award	
Huh Joon-ho and Kim Yoo-jung	Best Supporting Actor	
Kim Sun-young and Park Sung-woong	Best Supporting Actress	
Ryoo Seung-wan and Choi Ji-woo	Best Director	
Sul Kyung-gu and Jung Ryeo-won	Best Actor	
Moon So-ri and Ha Jung-woo	Best Actress	
Hwang Jung-min and Jung Hae-in	Best Film	

== Performances ==
Order	Artist	Act performed
1	NewJeans	"Hype Boy" + "Attention"
2	IVE	"Love Dive" + "After Like"
3	Zico	"Any Song" + "New Thing"
4	Jung Hoon-hee & La Poem	"Mist (안개)" (Decision to Leave OST)

== See also ==
- 58th Baeksang Arts Awards
- 58th Grand Bell Awards
- 31st Buil Film Awards
- 27th Chunsa Film Art Awards
