= Kim Dong-hwi =

South Korean actor (born 1995)

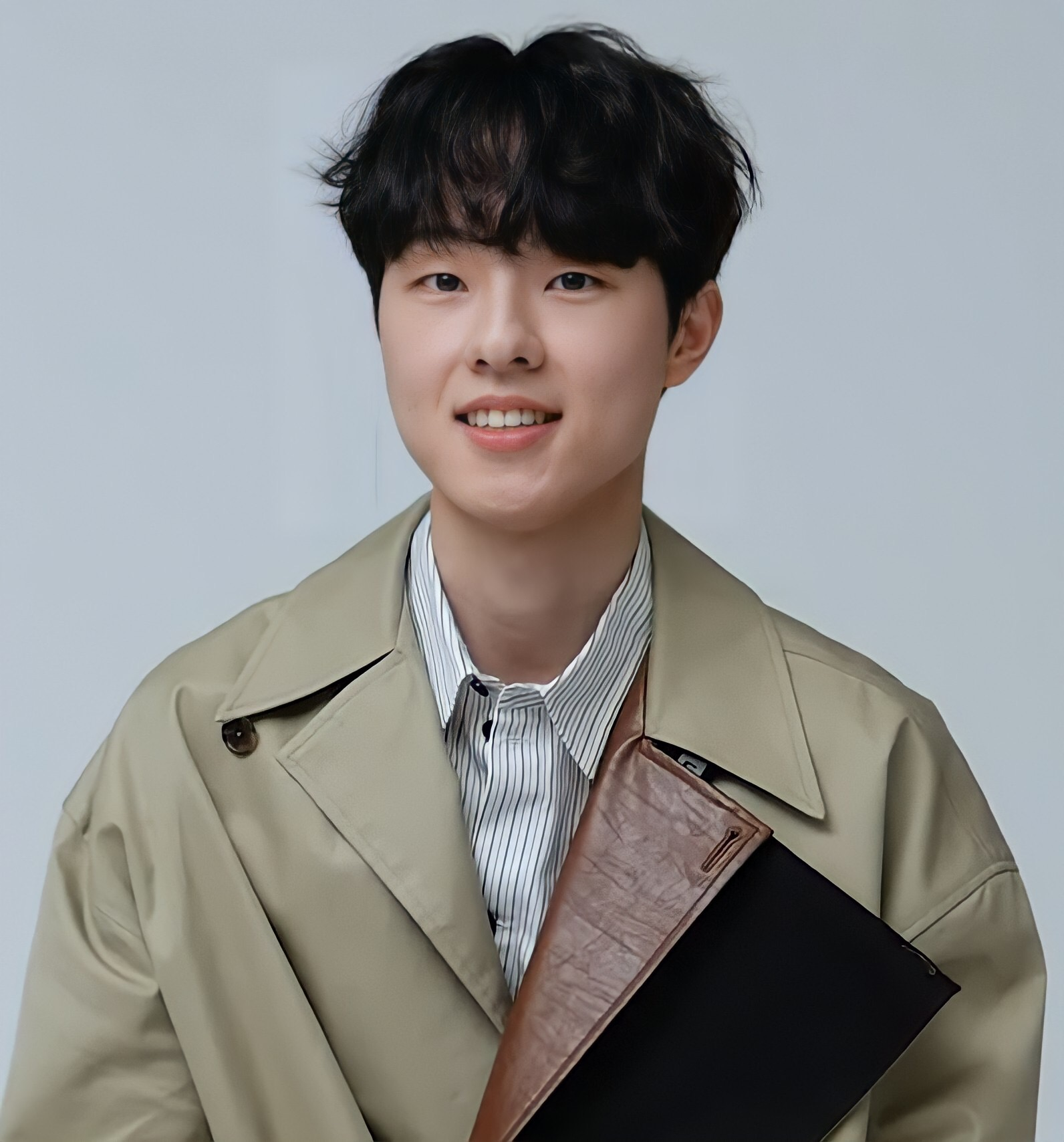
- Kim in January 2021
- Born: December 26, 1995 (age 30); South Korea
- Education: Seoul Institute of the Arts
- Occupation: Actor
- Years active: 2014–present
- Agent: Ace Factory

Korean name
- Hangul: 김동휘
- Hanja: 金東輝
- RR: Gim Donghwi
- MR: Kim Tonghwi

Kim Dong-hwi (Korean: 김동휘; born December 26, 1995) is a South Korean actor. He made his debut in the film The Royal Tailor (2014) and gained recognition for the drama film In Our Prime (2022), where he received critical acclaim.

== Early life ==
Kim Dong-hwi was born on December 26, 1995 as the only child. In high school, he was actively involved in the dance club, exploring various genres like K-pop and street dance. Recognizing his son's talent, such as forming a street dance team with friends and participating in competitions, Kim's father first encouraged him to pursue acting.

In his third year of high school, Kim Dong-hwi started acting in plays. In his first play, he was cast in a multi-role performance, which is typically reserved for the most skilled actors. However, at the time, it was the only role left, and Kim portraying a homeless person, a nail salon owner, and the youngest member of the theater troupe across three acts. Before taking on the multi-role, Kim already decided to properly learn the craft of acting. The teacher advised him to start with physical training, so he would run, crawl on the floor, and engage in various exercises. Kim felt both awkward and exhilarated as he expanded his physical and emotional range to embody the diverse characters.

== Career ==
Kim Dong-hwi quickly developed a passion for acting, appreciating "the joy of working together as a team for a long time" on stage. Driven by a desire to "experience real-life situations," he auditioned for The Royal Tailor (2014) at the age of 19. He was selected for a role as a younger version of the character acted by Yoo Yeon-seok. After demonstrating his potential, the production company Bidangil Pictures later offered him another role, as a younger version of the character acted by Yoo Yeon-seok in Perfect Proposal (2015).

Kim applied for the audition independently, without an agency, and overcame a highly competitive selection process with a 250:1 ratio to secure the lead role in In Our Prime, acting alongside veteran actor Choi Min-sik. Kim acted as high school student Han Ji-woo in the film. He prefers paper scripts to reading them on wearable devices, and analyzes characters by scribbling them with his hands instead of using a keyboard. "When I was filming In Our Prime, I bought a notebook to analyze characters. Even after using up that notebook, I still buy the same kind of notebook every time. I write about my character research, as well as my daily diary, reviewing the shooting conditions." For his role, Kim won the Best New Actor award at the 43rd Blue Dragon Film Awards.

In film Christmas Carol, Kim Dong-hwi plays Hwan, another boy who is bullied by Ja-hoon (Song Gun-hee), the revenge target of the twin brothers played by actor Park Jin-young.

== Personal life ==
Kim's role models include acclaimed actors Choi Min-sik, Lee Byung-hun, Cho Seung-woo, and Park Jung-min.

Kim's hobby is film camera photography. He is so passionate about film cameras that he runs a separate account for film camera uploads, in addition to his main Instagram account.

=== Military service ===
In November 2023, Kim told the media that he had applied for mandatory military service. He is now awaiting the official summons for enlistment.

In August 2024, it was announced that Kim will enlist as an active duty soldier in the 5th Division of the Army in Yeoncheon, Gyeonggi-do on September 24.

== Filmography ==
=== Film ===
Year	Title		Role	Notes	Ref.
Year	English	Korean	Role	Notes	Ref.
2014	The Royal Tailor	상의원	The Great Prince	Bit part	
2015	Perfect Proposal	은밀한 유혹	young Seong-yeol	Bit part	
2016	Phantom Detective	탐정 홍길동: 사라진 마을	Student	Bit part	
2018	Where To Go	노마드	Sang Woo	Short film	
2019	My First Time		Min-Su	Short film	
2020	Journey to the Shore	하고 싶은 아이	Hwang Min-ha	Short film	
2020	Honest Candidate	정직한 후보	Choi Seulgi	Bit part	
2022	In Our Prime	이상한 나라의 수학자	Han Ji-woo		
2022	Christmas Carol	크리스마스 캐럴	Son Hwan		
2024	Troll Factory	댓글부대	Chattatkat		
2026	The Table: Day and Night	낮과 밤은 서로에게	Jong-su	Opening film of BIFF	

=== Television series ===
Year	Title		Role	Notes	Ref.
Year	English	Korean	Role	Notes	Ref.
2020	Stranger	비밀의 숲	Kim Hu-jung	Bit part (season 2)	
2022–2023	Missing: The Other Side	미씽: 그들이 있었다 2	Oh Il-yong	Season 2	
2023	The Deal	거래	Song Jae-hyo		
2023	KBS Drama Special: "Overlap Knife, Knife"	오버랩 나이프, 나이프	Shin Su-ho	One-act drama	

== Accolades ==
=== Awards and nominations ===
Name of the award ceremony, year presented, category, nominee of the award, and the result of the nomination
Award ceremony	Year	Category	Nominee / Work	Result	Ref.
APAN Star Awards	2023	Best New Actor	The Deal	Won	
Baeksang Arts Awards	2022	Best New Actor – Film	In Our Prime	Nominated	
Blue Dragon Film Awards	2022	Best New Actor	In Our Prime	Won	
Buil Film Awards	2022	Best New Actor	In Our Prime	Nominated	
Busan Film Critics Awards	2022	Best New Actor	In Our Prime	Won	
Chunsa Film Art Awards	2022	Best New Actor	In Our Prime	Won (Note: Joint win with Mu Jin-sung)	
Director's Cut Awards	2023	Best New Actor in film	In Our Prime	Nominated	
Global Film & Television Huading Awards	2023	Best Global Newcomer	In Our Prime	Nominated	
Grand Bell Awards	2022	Best New Actor	In Our Prime	Nominated	

=== Listicles ===
Name of publisher, year listed, name of listicle, and placement
Publisher	Year	Listicle	Placement	Ref.
Cine21	2020	Five rising stars that Cine21 is paying attention to	Shortlisted	
