= 31st Buil Film Awards =

2022 edition of award ceremony

- Official poster
- Awarded for: Excellence in cinematic achievements
- Awarded by: Busan Ilbo
- Presented by: Hwaseung Group
- Announced on: Nominations: August 28, 2022
- Presented on: October 6, 2022
- Site: Signiel Busan Grand Ballroom in Haeundae-gu, Busan
- Hosted by: Kim Nam-gil; Choi Soo-young
- Official website: 2022 Buil Film Awards

Highlights
- Best Film: Decision to Leave
- Best Director: Kim Han-min; Hansan: Rising Dragon
- Best Actor: Park Hae-il; Decision to Leave
- Best Actress: Tang Wei; Decision to Leave
- Best Supporting Actor: Im Si-wan; Emergency Declaration
- Best Supporting Actress: Lee Soo-kyung; Miracle: Letters to the President
- Most nominations: 8 — Decision to Leave and Broker

Television coverage
- Network: MBC; Naver TV

The 31st Buil Film Awards (Korean: 제31회 부일영화상) ceremony is hosted by the Busan-based daily newspaper Busan Ilbo. It was held on October 6, 2022 at the Signiel Busan Grand Ballroom in Haeundae-gu, Busan. In the 31st edition, awards were presented in 16 categories for 215 Korean films that were released from August 11, 2021 to August 10, 2022. Kim Nam-gil and Choi Soo-young hosted the award show.

== Judging panel ==
The judging panel consisted of 9 members:

- Nam Dong-cheol: Busan International Film Festival chief programmer
- Park Ki-yong: Film Promotion Committee Chairman
- Yoo Ji-na: film critic, professor of Film and Digital Media at Dongguk University
- Lee Moo-young: film director, professor of Film and Video at Dongseo University
- Lee Joo-hyun: Busan Ilbo Culture Department Deputy Director
- Lee Joo-hyun: Cine21 editor
- Jeon Chan-il: film critic, chairman of the Korean Cultural Content Critics Association
- Jeong Min-ah: film critic, professor of Theatre and Film at Sungkyul University
- Hong Ji-young: film director - New Year Blues

== Awards and nominations ==
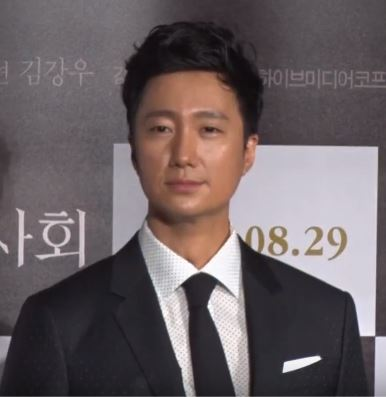
Park Hae-il, winner of Best Actor Award

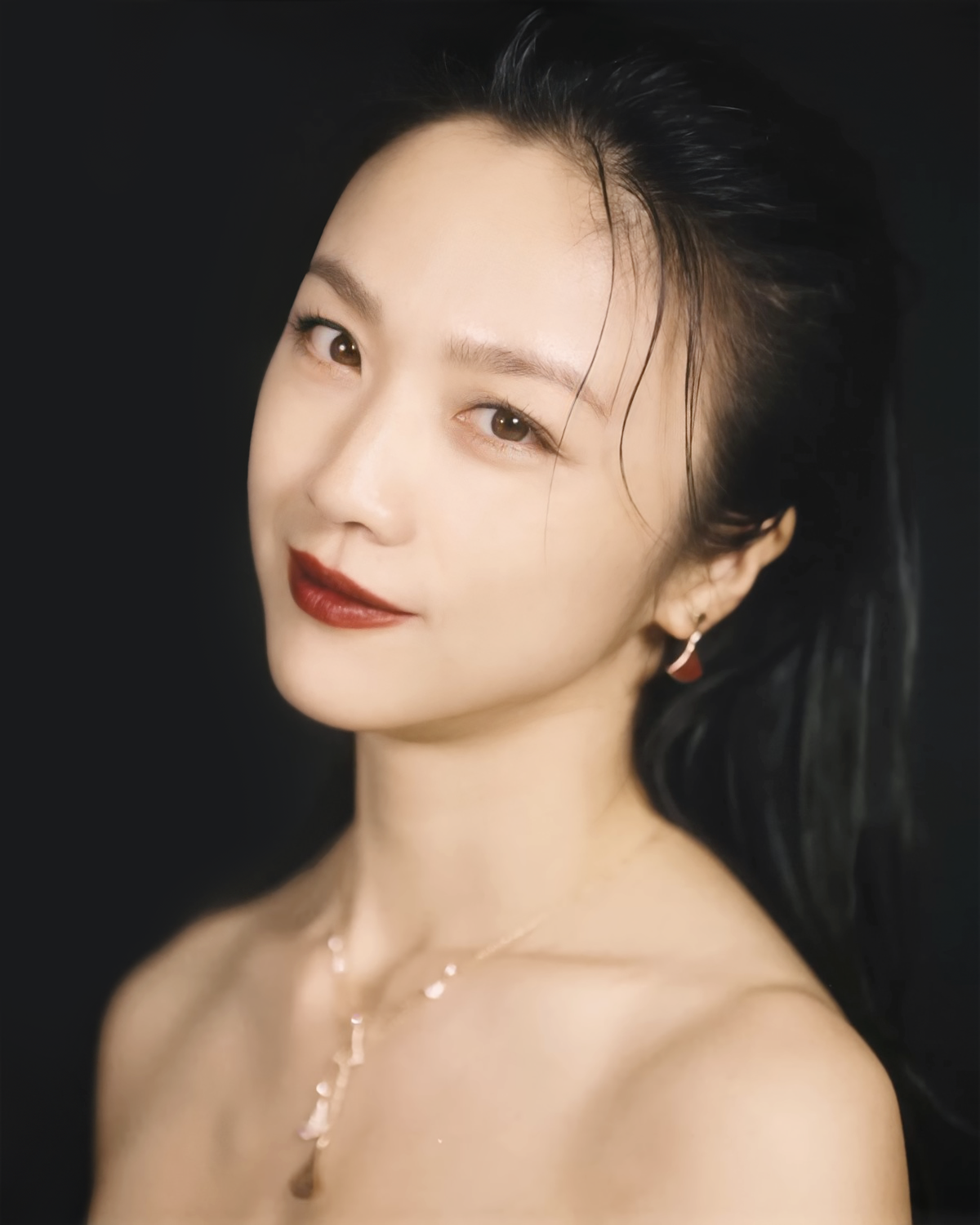
Tang Wei, winner of Best Actress Award

Nominees and winners (winners denoted in bold)

Best Film	Best Director
**Decision to Leave**; Broker; In Front of Your Face; Emergency Declaration; Hansan: Rising Dragon	**Kim Han-min – Hansan: Rising Dragon**; Hirokazu Kore-eda – Broker; Park Chan-wook – Decision to Leave; Lee Jung-jae – Hunt; Byun Sung-hyun – Kingmaker; Hong Sang-soo – In Front of Your Face
Best Actor	Best Actress
**Park Hae-il – Decision to Leave**; Song Kang-ho – Broker; Lee Jung-jae – Hunt; Sul Kyung-gu – Kingmaker; Jung Woo-sung – Hunt; Cho Jin-woong – The Policeman's Lineage	**Tang Wei – Decision to Leave**; Lee Jung-eun – Hommage; Lee Hye-young – In Front of Your Face; Jeon Do-yeon — Emergency Declaration; Chun Woo-hee – Anchor
Best Supporting Actor	Best Supporting Actress
**Im Si-wan – Emergency Declaration**; Kwon Hae-hyo – Hommage; Park Ji-hwan – The Roundup; Jo Woo-jin – Kingmaker; Heo Sung-tae – Hunt	**Lee Soo-kyung – Miracle: Letters to the President**; Kim So-jin – Emergency Declaration; Yum Jung-ah – Alienoid; Lee Joo-young — Broker; Jeon Hye-jin – Hunt
Best New Director	Best Screenplay
**Lee Jung-jae – Hunt**; Yoon Seo-jin – Chorokbam; Lee Ran-hee – Vacation; Lee Woo-jeong – Snowball; Jo Eun-ji – Perhaps Love	**Jung Wook – Good Person**; Park Chan-wook, Jeong Seo-kyeong – Decision to Leave; Lee Jung-jae, Jo Seung-Hee – Hunt; Hirokazu Kore-eda – Broker; Byun Sung-hyun, Kim Min-soo – Kingmaker
Best New Actor	Best New Actress
**Lee Hyo-je – Good Person**; Tang Jun-sang – Hommage; Kim Dong-hwi – In Our Prime; Lee Hong-nae – Hot Blooded; Son Suk-ku – The Roundup	**Choi Sung-eun – Ten Months**; Lee Ji-eun – Broker; Kim Hye-yoon – The Girl on a Bulldozer; Bang Min-ah – Snowball; Go Youn-jung – Hunt
Best Cinematography	Art/Technical Award
**Kim Ji-yong – Decision to Leave**; Lee Mo-gae – Hunt; Kim Tae-seong – Hansan: Rising Dragon; Jo Hyung-rae – Kingmaker; Hong Kyung-pyo – Broker	**Jeong Seong-jin, Jeong Cheol-min – Hansan: Rising Dragon** (VFX); Park Il-hyun – Hunt (Art); Ryu Seong-hui – Decision to Leave (Art); Jegal Seung – Alien+Human Part 1 (VFX); Han Ah-reum – Kingmaker (Art)
Best Music	Yu Hyun-mok Film Arts Award
**Jo Yeong-wook – Decision to Leave**; Kim Jong-yeon – Lime Crime; Lee Dong-june – Perhaps Love; Jang Young-gyu – Alienoid; Jung Jae-il – Broker	**Lee Ran-hee**
Popular Star Award - Male	Popular Star Award - Female
**Byun Yo-han – Hansan: Rising Dragon**	**Lee Ji-eun – Broker**

== See also ==
- 58th Baeksang Arts Awards
- 58th Grand Bell Awards
- 43rd Blue Dragon Film Awards
- 27th Chunsa Film Art Awards
