= Ten Months =

2020 South Korean pregnancy drama film

- Official poster
- Hangul: 십개월의 미래
- RR: Sipgaeworui mirae
- MR: Sipkaewŏrŭi mirae
- Directed by: Nam Koong-sun
- Screenplay by: Nam Koong-sun
- Produced by: Choi Dal-ah
- Starring: Choi Sung-eun; Baek Hyun-jin; Seo Young-joo; Yoo Eden
- Cinematography: Jung Yong-hyun
- Edited by: Nam Koong-sun; Son Yeon-ji
- Music by: Byul.org; Nam Koong-sun
- Production company: Korea National University of Arts
- Distributed by: Green Narae Media
- Release dates: May 28, 2020 (Jeonju); October 14, 2021 (South Korea)
- Running time: 96 minutes
- Country: South Korea
- Language: Korean

Ten Months (Korean: 십개월의 미래; RR: Sipgaeworui mirae; lit. 'The Future of Ten Months') is a 2020 South Korean pregnancy drama film written and directed by Nam Koong-sun in her directorial debut starring Choi Sung-eun. The film is a feature project from the Korea National University of Arts (K'Arts) that debuted in the Korean Cinema Section of the Jeonju International Film Festival on May 28, 2020. The film was released domestically in South Korea on October 14, 2021.

== Synopsis ==
29-year-old game developer, Mirae (Choi Sung-eun) suddenly realizes that she is 11 weeks pregnant. She tells her boyfriend, and his immediate response is to say that they should get married. A vegetarian, the boyfriend is forced to work on his parents' pig farm to ensure that they get the support they need. Meanwhile, when Mirae's boss finds out about the pregnancy, all the hard work she has put into her career comes tumbling down.

== Cast ==
- Choi Sung-eun as Choi Mi-rae
- Baek Hyun-jin as Ong-joong
- Seo Young-joo as Yoon-ho
- Yoo Eden as Kim-kim
- Kwon Ah-reum as Kang-mi
- Son Sung-chan as Hong-seon
- Kim Geun-young as Soon-ja
- Oh Tae-eun as Eun-ok
- Song Kyung-eui as Seong-tae
- Go Young-chan as Hyeon-jae
- Bang Joo-hwan as Chang-soo

== Production ==
Director Nam Koong-sun shared in an interview that the film was first envisioned in 2015 but it was only in 2018 when the screenplay was picked up as an independent feature project from the Korea National University of Arts (K'Arts).

== Release ==
The film was first premiered at the 21st Jeonju International Film Festival under the Korean Cinema Section held from May 28 to September 20, 2020. The film also became available for a fee on OTT platform Wave from May 28 to June 6, 2020.

It was invited at the 20th New York Asian Film Festival and was the only Korean film featured in the competitive category, 'Uncaged Section' and screened at Lincoln Center and SVA Theatre in the two-week festival held from August 6 to 22, 2021 in New York. Ten Months was also invited to premiere at the 41st Hawaii International Film Festival's 'Spotlight on Korea' section held from November 4–28, 2021. The same year, it was also invited to the 'Paysage section' of the 16th Paris Korean Film Festival held in Paris, France for 8 days from October 26 to November 2, 2021.

The film was theatrically released on October 14, 2021.

=== Box office ===
The film had a cumulative admission of 15,431 audiences.

=== Reception ===
Going by Korean review aggregator Naver Movie Database, the film holds an approval rating of 7.6 from the audience.

Lee Jae-lim of Korea JoongAng Daily wrote that the film drew similarities to "Kim Ji Young, Born 1982," by diving into the lives of Korean women, specifically in as Mi-rae grapples with various obstacles that arise throughout her pregnancy even further stating that the film should be designated as a mandatory part of Korea's sex education. Lee "...found the narrative where Mi-rae suddenly decides to accept motherhood came somewhat out of the blue..." but stating "Nevertheless, I would like to give a standing ovation to the lead actor Choi Sung-eun who portrayed Mi-rae, a rookie actor who debuted through the film "Start-Up" last year."

== Awards and nominations ==
Year	Awards	Category	Recipient	Result	Ref.
2021	41st Hawaii International Film Festival	Kau Ka Hōkū Award	Ten Months	Honorable Mention	
2021	20th New York Asian Film Festival	Uncaged Award for Best Feature Film Competition	Ten Months	Honorable Mention	
2022	58th Baeksang Arts Awards	Best New Actress	Choi Sung-eun	Nominated	
2022	58th Baeksang Arts Awards	Best New Director	Nam Koong-sun	Nominated	
2022	58th Baeksang Arts Awards	Best Screenplay	Nam Koong-sun	Nominated	
2022	31st Buil Film Awards	Best New Actress	Choi Sung-eun	Won	
2022	27th Chunsa Film Art Awards	Best New Director	Nam Koong-sun	Nominated	
2022	58th Grand Bell Awards	Best New Director	Nam Koong-sun	Nominated	
