= Tang Jun-sang =

South Korean actor (born 2003)

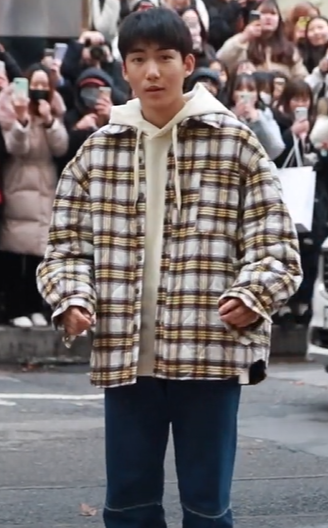
- Tang in 2020
- Born: August 13, 2003 (age 22); Seoul, South Korea
- Education: Chung-Ang University – Theater and Film
- Alma mater: Goyang Arts High School
- Occupation: Actor
- Years active: 2010–present
- Agent(s): CL& Company

Korean name
- Hangul: 탕준상
- Hanja: 陳俊尚
- RR: Tang Junsang
- MR: T'ang Chunsang

Tang Jun-sang (Korean: 탕준상; born on August 13, 2003) is a South Korean actor. He gained recognition for his role in the television series Crash Landing on You (2019–2020) and leading role in both Move to Heaven (2021) and Racket Boys (2021).

== Early life and education ==
Tang was born on August 13, 2003, in Seoul to a Chinese Malaysian father and a South Korean mother, with Tang holding South Korean citizenship after his mother.

Tang studies at the Department of Theater and Film Chung-Ang University.

== Career ==
Tang made his debut as a musical actor Billy Elliot in 2010 at the age of 7, after which he continued playing in musicals such as Eileigh Seabed, West Pyeonje, KinkyBoots and Assassin.

In 2014, Tang made his drama debut in Pluto Secret Order as Lee Seo-jin and continued to play supporting roles in various movies and dramas.

He gained recognition for his role as Geum Eun Dong – a young North Korean soldier in Crash Landing on You (2019–2020) which became the highest rated tvN drama and the third highest-rated South Korean TV drama in cable television history.

In 2021, Tang starred in Netflix original series Move to Heaven playing the leading role Han Geu-ru, a young man with Asperger syndrome, alongside Lee Je-hoon. In the same year, he played a leading role in the television series Racket Boys for which he received Best Young Actor Award at 2021 SBS Drama Awards.

== Filmography ==
=== Film ===
Year	Title	Role	Notes	Ref.
2016	A Melody To Remember	Choon-sik		
2017	Arrival	Boy	Short film	
2018	Seven Years of Night	Seo-won (young)		
2018	Youngju	Young-in		
2019	Birthday	Woo-chan		
2019	The King's Letters	Hak-jo		
2020	Bike Thief	Ki-tae	Short film	
2021	Unframed – Blue happiness	—N/a	Short film	
2022	In Our Prime	Lee Tae-yeon		
2022	Hommage	Ji-wan's son		
2024	Dog Days	Jin-woo		
2024	The Plot	Jeom-man		
2024	Wonderland	Choi Jin-gu		

=== Television series ===
Year	Title	Role	Notes	Ref.
2014	Pluto Squad	Lee Seo-jin		
2014	Single-minded Dandelion	Seo Joon-ho (young)		
2015	My Grandmother		Children's Day Special Series	
2018	A Poem a Day	Kyu-min		
2019–2020	Crash Landing on You	Geum Eun-dong		
2021	Racket Boys	Yoon Hae-kang		
2025	Newtopia	Sam-soo		
2025	Oh My Ghost Clients	Bo Sal (Buddha)		

=== Web series ===
Year	Title		Role	Notes	Ref.
Year	English	Korean	Role	Notes	Ref.
2021	Move to Heaven	무브 투 헤븐	Han Geu-ru	Netflix Original Series	

== Stage ==
=== Musical ===
Musical performances
Year	Title		Role	Theater	Date	Ref.
Year	English	Korean	Role	Theater	Date	Ref.
2010–2011	Billy Elliot	빌리 엘리어트	Boy	LG Arts Center	August 13 to February 27	
2011	Mozart	모차르트	Amadeus Mozart (young)	Seongnam Arts Center	May 24 to July 3	
2011	The Last Empress	명성황후	Seiko	Chungmu Art Hall	October 29 to November 20	
2012	Elizabeth das Musical	엘리자벳	Rudolph (young)	Blue Square Samsung	February 8 to May 12	
2012	Mozart	모차르트	Amadeus Mozart (young)	Sejong Center	May 24 to July 3	
2012	Assassins	어쌔신	Billy	Doosan Art Center	November 20 to February 3	
2013	Les Misérables	레미제라블	Gavroche	Blue Square Samsung	April 6 to September 1	
2014	Seopyeonje	서편제	Dong-ho (young)	Universal Art Center	March 20 to May 11	
2014	Kinky Boots	킹키부츠	Lola	Chungmu Art Center Medium Theater Black	December 2 to February 22	

=== Theater ===
List of stage play(s)
Year	Title		Role	Theater	Date	Ref.
Year	English	Korean	Role	Theater	Date	Ref.
2016	Theatrical Battle 6 – Hamlet the Play	연극열전6 – 세 번째 작품 "햄릿 – 더 플레이"	Hamlet (young)	Chungmu Art Center Medium Theater Black	Aug 2 – Oct 16	

== Awards and nominations ==
Award ceremony	Year	Category	Nominee / Work	Result	Ref.
APAN Star Awards	2022	Best New Actor	Move to Heaven; Racket Boys	Won	
Asia Contents Awards	2021	Newcomer Actor	Move to Heaven	Nominated	
Baeksang Arts Awards	2022	Best New Actor – Television	Racket Boys	Nominated	
Buil Film Awards	2022	Best New Actor	Hommage	Nominated	
Cine 21 Awards	2021	Best New Actor of the Year	Move to Heaven; Racket Boys	Won	
Chunsa Film Art Awards	2022	Best New Actor	Hommage	Nominated	
Grand Bell Awards	2022	Best New Actor	Hommage	Nominated	
SBS Drama Awards	2021	Best Young Actor	Racket Boys	Won	
