= Mu Jin-sung =

South Korean actor (born 1988)

- 무진성
- Born: Yeo Eui-ju; May 24, 1988 (age 38); Incheon, South Korea
- Education: Dongguk University Theatre film studies (Bachelor)
- Occupation: Actor
- Years active: 2013–present
- Agent: Alien Company

Korean name
- Hangul: 여의주
- RR: Yeo Uiju
- MR: Yŏ Ŭiju

Stage name
- Hangul: 무진성
- RR: Mu Jinseong
- MR: Mu Chinsŏng
- Website: Official website

Yeo Eui-ju (Korean: 여의주; born May 24, 1988), better known by the stage name Mu Jin-sung (무진성) is a South Korean actor. He made his debut in MBC 2013 drama Two Weeks. Moo is also known for his role in Jo Eun-ji's film Perhaps Love.

== Early life ==
Mu Jin-sung is a stage name of Yeo Eui-ju, who was born on May 24, 1988, in Incheon. In his youth, Yeo held leadership positions, serving as the president of the Children's Association in elementary school and as the vice president in middle school. He also maintained excellent academic performance throughout his high school years. A pivotal moment occurred when Yeo accompanied a friend interested in theater to a play in Daehangno. This experience left a deep impression on him. Yeo recounted thinking to himself, "How many jobs allow you to be applauded by so many people? To do what I love and be applauded by others - what a wonderful prospect!" This realization prompted Yeo to decide on pursuing a career in acting. Following this decision, he studied acting at the Department of Theater and Film Dongguk University.

== Career ==
=== 2013 to 2015: Early career with name Yeo Eui-ju ===
After debuting in 2013 with the MBC drama Two Weeks, Yeo Eui-joo gained recognition through various works under his real name, including the MBC historical drama The King's Daughter, Soo Baek-hyang, tvN drama Misaeng: Incomplete Life and MBC historical drama Shine or Go Crazy. Yeo impressed viewers by playing the contrasting roles of a loyal Hongmun-gwan scholar and a vampire scholar in MBC historical drama The Scholar Who Walks the Night.

=== 2017 to present: Stage name Mu Jin-sung ===
Following a two-year hiatus, Yeo Eui-joo consulted a fortune teller who recommended the name change, which led him to adopt his new stage name Mu Jin-sung. This decision proved to be fortunate as it opened up new acting opportunities for him. In 2017, Mu Jin-sung signed an exclusive contract with Five Brothers Korea.

In 2018, Mu get his first lead role in Naver web drama Closer than Uijeongbu, Farther than Sadang, Season 3. Mu received a lot of love from viewers for his role as director Woo Jung-woo. In the same year, Mu was cast as Ki-chan in the romantic comedy web drama Natural Romance, produced by The Korea Environmental Industry & Technology Institute to promote eco-friendly consumption habits. The series, comprising 5 episodes, was released on Naver TV. The story follows Seol-ah (played by Yoo Hye-in), a job seeker studying environmental engineering but lacking interest in the environment, and Ki-chan, an environmental lawyer dedicated to living an eco-friendly lifestyle.

In 2019, Mu was cast as Ki Dae-joo in SBS mini-series The Secret Life of My Secretary. However he was replaced later by Koo Ja-sung.

In 2021, Mu starred in KBS 1TV's Lunar New Year special musical drama Gumiho Recipe. He played the role of Jin-woo Do-ryeong from his previous life and Yun-ho from his current life. In October, Moo signed an exclusive contract with Studio & New.

Mu's breakthrough came after starring in Jo Eun-ji's film Perhaps Love. He landed the role of Yoo-jin, an aspiring genius writer, after winning a competitive audition with rates of 200 to 1. He received nominations in the new actor category at the 58th Baeksang Arts Awards and 43rd Blue Dragon Film Awards. He won the Best New Actor Award at the 27th Chunsa Film Arts Award and the 58th Grand Bell Awards.

In September 2023, Mu signed an exclusive contract with Alien Company. In July 2024, it was reported that Mu was cast in Director Park Hoon-jung's first drama series The Tyrant. Moo plays the role of Yeon Mo-yong, who requests work from technician Ja-kyung (played by Jo Yoon-soo) who steals samples of the Tyrant Program.

== Filmography ==
=== Film ===
Film appearances
Year	Title	Role	Ref.
2021	Perhaps Love	Yoo-jin	

=== Television series ===
Television series appearances
Year	Title	Role	Notes	Ref.
2013	Two Weeks	Kim Min-soo		
2013	Passionate Love	Hong Soo-hyuk (younger version)		
2013	The King's Daughter, Soo Baek-hyang	Kang-bok		
2014	A Witch's Love	Jin-woo		
2014	Misaeng: Incomplete Life	Jang Ki-seok		
2014	Dr. Frost	Kim Young-ho		
2015	Shine or Go Crazy	Wang-jong		
2015	The Scholar Who Walks the Night	Noh Hak-young		
2015	Beautiful You	Ma Seung-gi		
2018	Closer than Uijeongbu, Far from the Shrine Season 3	Woo Jung-woo	Seezn Web Drama	
2018	Natural Romance	Choi Ki-chan	Naver TV Web Drama	
2020	Birthcare Center	Cha Woo-seok		
2021	Gumiho Recipe	Yun-ho		
2023	Strangers Again	Min Jae-gyeom		
2024	The Tyrant	Yoon Mo-yong	Disney+ Original Series	
2025	Typhoon Family	Pyo Hyeon-jun		
2026	A Bona Fide Killer	Ki Young-do		

== Accolades ==
=== Awards and nominations ===
Awards and nominations
Award ceremony	Year	Category	Recipient	Result	Ref.
16th Asian Model Awards	2021	Fashionista Award	Mu Jin-sung	Won	
58th Baeksang Arts Awards	2022	Best New Actor – Film	Perhaps Love	Nominated	
43rd Blue Dragon Film Awards	2022	Best New Actor	Perhaps Love	Nominated	
27th Chunsa Film Art Awards	2022	Best New Actor	Perhaps Love	Won (Note: Joint winner with Kim Dong-hwi)	
58th Grand Bell Awards	2022	Best New Actor	Perhaps Love	Won	
Korea Drama Awards	2026	Best Male Scene Stealer	Typhoon Family, Mousetrap	Won	

=== Listicles ===
Name of publisher, year listed, name of listicle, and placement
Publisher	Year	Listicle	Placement	Ref.
Cine21	2020	Five rising stars that Cine21 is paying attention to	Shortlisted	
