= Kingmaker (film) =

2022 South Korean political drama film

- Theatrical release poster
- Hangul: 킹메이커
- RR: Kingmeikeo
- MR: K'ingmeik'ŏ
- Directed by: Byun Sung-hyun
- Written by: Byun Sung-Hyun; Kim Min-soo
- Produced by: Lee Jin-hee; Park Jun-ho
- Starring: Sul Kyung-gu; Lee Sun-kyun
- Cinematography: Jo Hyung-rae
- Edited by: Kim Sang-bum
- Music by: Kim Hong-jip; Lee Jin-hee
- Production company: Seed Film
- Distributed by: Megabox Plus M
- Release date: January 26, 2022
- Running time: 123 minutes
- Country: South Korea
- Language: Korean
- Budget: ₩12 billion
- Box office: US$6 million

Kingmaker (Korean: 킹메이커) is a 2022 South Korean historical political drama film, written and directed by Byun Sung-hyun. Set against the backdrop of the 1970 presidential primary of the New Democratic Party, the film is based on real events involving Kim Dae-jung and his key strategist, Uhm Chang-rok.

Kingmaker was scheduled to be theatrically released on December 29, 2021, but due to the COVID-19 resurgence, it was released on January 26, 2022 to coincide with the Korean New Year holidays. It was also officially invited in the competition section at the 24th Udine Far East Film Festival held from April 22 to 30, 2022.

== Plot ==
In the 1960s, Seo Chang-dae, a man with political ambitions who is temporarily running a pharmacy, catches the attention of emerging politician Kim Woon-beom. Impressed by Seo's determination and unconventional thinking, Kim takes him on as a political aide. Seo soon proves himself as a skilled strategist, helping Kim win a National Assembly seat in Mokpo despite extensive government interference and bribery. After the victory, government officials attempt to recruit Seo, but he refuses.

As the New Democratic Party prepares for the presidential election, Seo encourages Kim to challenge the party establishment and run for the nomination. Kim enters the race against the younger Kim Young-ho, who has launched the "40s generation" movement against party leader Kang In-san. Rather than relying on established factions, Seo has Kim's campaign personally appeal to delegates across the country. When Kang eventually joins forces with Kim Young-ho and Lee Han-sang, Seo targets Lee, exploiting his political ambitions to break the alliance. He ultimately convinces Lee to support Kim by offering him the party chairmanship. Kim defeats Kim Young-ho in the runoff and becomes the opposition party's presidential candidate, with Seo formally joining his campaign.

During the presidential campaign, Kim comes under attack over his pledge to abolish the reserve forces. Seo proposes staging a terrorist attack to generate sympathy, but Kim rejects the idea and warns that Seo is not ready for politics. Soon afterward, Kim's home is actually bombed, and Seo is arrested. Although he is eventually released, Kim asks him to withdraw from official campaign activities. Feeling that his contributions entitle him to political power, Seo argues that the people are merely a force that politicians can manipulate. Kim rejects his cynical view and insists that politics must be based on democratic principles. When Kim asks whether Seo was responsible for the bombing, Seo tearfully admits that he was, ending their partnership.

Seo is subsequently recruited by Director Lee and begins working for the government. He helps exploit regional divisions, using historical tensions between the Silla and Baekje regions to turn the election into a contest of regional loyalties. As the campaign grows increasingly divisive, Seo becomes disillusioned with what he has helped create. Kim ultimately loses the presidential election, and Seo leaves politics. It is later revealed that Lee had orchestrated the bombing of Kim's home to drive a wedge between Kim and Seo and bring Seo over to the government's side, although Lee continues to deny involvement.

Years later, Kim and Seo meet again and reflect on their political careers and past choices. Their conversation reveals how differently they have come to view politics and the means by which political change can be achieved. The film then reveals that South Korea achieved its first peaceful transfer of power in 1997, followed by the statement that Seo Chang-dae was not part of it.

== Cast ==
- Sul Kyung-gu as Kim Woon-beom, based on Kim Dae-jung
- Lee Sun-kyun as Seo Chang-dae, based on Uhm Chang-rok
- Yoo Jae-myung as Kim Young-ho, based on Kim Young-sam
- Jo Woo-jin as Director Lee, based on Lee Hu-rak
- Park In-hwan as Kang In-san, based on Yu Chin-san
- Kim Sung-oh as Secretary Park
- Jeon Bae-soo as Lee's assistant
- Seo Eun-soo as Soo-yeon
- Kim Jong-soo as President, based on Park Chung Hee
- Yoon Kyung-ho as Mr. Kim, based on Kim Hyong-uk
- Lee Hae-young as Lee Han-Sang, based on Lee Cheol-seung
- Park Hyung-soo as Jeong-hyeon
- Kim Sae-byuk as Myung-sook
- Jung Woo-hyuk as Chief of the Joint Chiefs of Staff
- Lee Hwa-ryong as opposition lawmaker
- Yoon Se-woong as secretary Kim Woon-beom
- Son Kyung-won as New Democratic Party campaigner
- Bae Jong-ok as Hee-ran, based on Lee Hee-ho
- Jin Seon-kyu as Farmer
- Kim Joo-ryoung as Professor Kang
- Jang In-sub

== Production ==
Sul Kyung-gu was cast in the film in July 2018 as politician and Lee Sun-kyun as political strategist. Director Byun Sung-Hyun and Sol Kyung-gu are working together after 2017 crime thriller film The Merciless. On March 29, 2019, on completion of cast line-up the script reading site was revealed by releasing photos.

Director Byun Sung-Hyun worked with his old team for the film. Art director Han Ah-reum, Kim Hong-jip and Lee Jin-hee (music) and Lee Gil-gyu, director of Lighting have worked with him on The Merciless. The film was produced with an estimated cost of ₩12 billion.

Principal photography began on March 25, 2019. and It ended in July 30, 2019.

== Release ==
The film was scheduled for release on December 29, 2021 but due to fresh wave of COVID-19 pandemic it has been postponed to January 2022 to coincide with Korean New Year holiday. It was released on January 26, 2022.

The film was officially invited in competition section of the 24th Udine Far East Film Festival held from April 22 to 30, 2022.

=== Home media ===
The film was made available for streaming on IPTV (Olleh TV, SK Btv, TV, LG U+TV), Home Choice, TVING, Naver TV, WAVVE, Google Play, KT skylife, Cinefox and KakaoPage from February 24, 2022.

== Reception ==
=== Box office ===
The film was released on 1184 screens on January 26, 2022. As per Korean Film Council (Kofic) integrated computer network, the film opened at 2nd place with 58,974 admissions at the Korean box office. It maintained its no 2 position at the Korean box office for consecutive 14 days after its release.

As of September 10, 2022, it is at 12th place among all the Korean films released in the year 2022, with gross of US$6.00 million and 775,583 admissions.

=== Critical response ===
Song Kyung-won of Cine21 wrote that the film differed from other political dramas and films as it focused on the relationships between the main characters rather than politics or the actual plot, given the fact that the storyline itself was a thinly veiled reference to Kim Dae-jung's presidential election campaign. Song appreciated the direction of Byun Seong-hyeon's writing, "From the stylish scenes, sensuous shooting, and the strong chemistry between the characters, the director's talents are still alive." Concluding the review, Song observed that Seo's use of negative campaigning to help Kim win raised a fundamental question about whether the end justifies the means.

== Accolades ==
| Year | Award | Category | Recipient(s) | Result | Ref. |
|---|---|---|---|---|---|
| 2022 | 58th Baeksang Arts Awards | Best Film | Kingmaker | Nominated | |
| 2022 | 58th Baeksang Arts Awards | Best Director | Byun Sung-hyun | Won | |
| 2022 | 58th Baeksang Arts Awards | Best Actor | Sul Kyung-gu | Won | |
| 2022 | 58th Baeksang Arts Awards | Best Actor | Lee Sun-kyun | Nominated | |
| 2022 | 58th Baeksang Arts Awards | Best Supporting Actor | Jo Woo-Jin | Won | |
| 2022 | 58th Baeksang Arts Awards | Best Screenplay | Byun Sung-hyun and Kim Min-soo | Nominated | |
| 2022 | 58th Baeksang Arts Awards | Best Cinematography Award | Jo Hyung-rae | Nominated | |
| 2022 | 58th Baeksang Arts Awards | Best Technical Award (Art) | Han Ah-reum | Nominated | |
| 2022 | Chunsa Film Art Awards 2022 | Best Director | Byun Sung-hyun | Nominated | |
| 2022 | Chunsa Film Art Awards 2022 | Best Actor | Sul Kyung-gu | Nominated | |
| 2022 | Chunsa Film Art Awards 2022 | Best Supporting Actor | Jo Woo-Jin | Nominated | |
| 2022 | 31st Buil Film Awards | Best Director | Byun Sung-hyun | Nominated | |
| 2022 | 31st Buil Film Awards | Best Actor | Sul Kyung-gu | Nominated | |
| 2022 | 31st Buil Film Awards | Best Supporting Actor | Jo Woo-jin | Nominated | |
| 2022 | 43rd Blue Dragon Film Awards | Best Film | Kingmaker | Nominated | |
| 2022 | 43rd Blue Dragon Film Awards | Best Director | Byun Sung-hyun | Nominated | |
| 2022 | 43rd Blue Dragon Film Awards | Best Actor | Sul Kyung-gu | Nominated | |
| 2022 | 43rd Blue Dragon Film Awards | Best Screenplay | Byun Sung-hyun, Kim Min-soo | Nominated | |
| 2022 | 43rd Blue Dragon Film Awards | Best Editing | Kim Sang-beom | Nominated | |
| 2022 | 43rd Blue Dragon Film Awards | Best Cinematography and Lighting | Jo Hyung-rae, Lee Gil-gyu | Nominated | |
| 2022 | 43rd Blue Dragon Film Awards | Best Art Direction | Han Ah-reum | Won | |
| 2022 | 58th Grand Bell Awards | Best Film | Kingmaker | Nominated | |
| 2022 | 58th Grand Bell Awards | Best Director | Byun Sung-hyun | Won | |
| 2022 | 58th Grand Bell Awards | Best Actor | Sul Kyung-gu | Nominated | |
| 2022 | 58th Grand Bell Awards | Best Supporting Actor | Jo Woo-Jin | Nominated | |
| 2022 | 58th Grand Bell Awards | Best Screenplay | Byun Sung-hyun, Kim Min-soo | Nominated | |
| 2022 | 58th Grand Bell Awards | Best Art Direction | Han Ah-reum | Nominated | |
| 2022 | 58th Grand Bell Awards | Best Lighting | Lee Gil-gyu | Nominated | |
| 2022 | 58th Grand Bell Awards | Best Costume Design | Jo Hee-ran | Nominated | |
