= Byun Sung-hyun =

South Korean film director and screenwriter

- Born: 1980 (age 45–46); South Korea
- Occupation: Filmmaker
- Years active: 2010–present

Korean name
- Hangul: 변성현
- RR: Byeon Seonghyeon
- MR: Pyŏn Sŏnghyŏn

Byun Sung-hyun (Korean: 변성현; born 1980) is a South Korean film director and screenwriter. He is best known for his films The Merciless (2017), Kingmaker (2022), and Kill Boksoon (2023).

== Filmography ==
=== Film ===
Year	Film	Credited as			Ref.
Year	Film	Director	Writer	Producer	Ref.
2012	Whatcha Wearin'?	Yes	Yes	No	
2017	The Merciless	Yes	Yes	No	
2022	Kingmaker	Yes	Yes	No	
2023	Kill Boksoon	Yes	Yes	No	
2025	Good News	Yes	Yes	No	

== Accolades ==
Year	Award	Category	Nominated work	Result	Ref.
2017	54th Grand Bell Awards	Best Director	The Merciless	Nominated	
2017	38th Blue Dragon Film Awards	Best Director	The Merciless	Nominated	
2022	58th Baeksang Arts Awards	Best Film	Kingmaker	Nominated	
2022	58th Baeksang Arts Awards	Best Director	Kingmaker	Won	
2022	58th Baeksang Arts Awards	Best Screenplay (Note: with Kim Min-soo)	Kingmaker	Nominated	
2022	Chunsa Film Art Awards 2022	Best Director	Kingmaker	Nominated	
2022	31st Buil Film Awards	Best Director	Kingmaker	Nominated	
2022	43rd Blue Dragon Film Awards	Best Film	Kingmaker	Nominated	
2022	43rd Blue Dragon Film Awards	Best Director	Kingmaker	Nominated	
2022	43rd Blue Dragon Film Awards	Best Screenplay	Kingmaker	Nominated	
2022	58th Grand Bell Awards	Best Film	Kingmaker	Nominated	
2022	58th Grand Bell Awards	Best Director	Kingmaker	Won	
2022	58th Grand Bell Awards	Best Screenplay	Kingmaker	Nominated	
2025	29th Chunsa Film Art Awards	Best Director in OTT Film	Good News	Won	
2026	62nd Baeksang Arts Awards	Best Director	Good News	Nominated	
2026	62nd Baeksang Arts Awards	Best Screenplay	Good News	Won	
2026	47th Blue Dragon Film Awards	Best Screenplay	Good News	Pending	
2026	35th Buil Film Awards	Best Director	Good News	Nominated	
2026	35th Buil Film Awards	Best Screenplay	Good News	Won	
2026	Korean Association of Film Critics Awards	Best Screenplay	Good News	Won	
