= Confidential Assignment 2: International =

2022 South Korean action film

Confidential Assignment 2
- Theatrical release poster
- Hangul: 공조2: 인터내셔날
- Lit.: Cooperation 2: International
- RR: Gongjo2: inteonaesyeonal
- MR: Kongjo2: int'ŏnaesyŏnal
- Directed by: Lee Seok-hoon
- Written by: Lim Seong-soon
- Produced by: Yoon Je-kyoon; Gil Young-min
- Starring: Hyun Bin; Yoo Hae-jin; Im Yoon-ah; Daniel Henney; Jin Seon-kyu
- Cinematography: Hong Jae-sik
- Edited by: Nam Na-young
- Music by: Hwang Sang-jun
- Production company: JK Film
- Distributed by: CJ Entertainment
- Release date: September 7, 2022
- Running time: 129 minutes
- Country: South Korea
- Language: Korean
- Budget: ₩18 billion
- Box office: US$54.5 million

Confidential Assignment 2: International (Korean: 공조2: 인터내셔날) is a 2022 South Korean action comedy film directed by Lee Seok-hoon and written by Lim Seong-soon. It serves as the sequel to the 2017 film Confidential Assignment. The film stars Hyun Bin, Yoo Hae-jin, Im Yoon-ah, Daniel Henney and Jin Seon-kyu. The music was composed by Hwang Sang-jun, while cinematography and editing were handled by Hong Jae-sik and Nam Na-young.

Confidential Assignment 2: International was released on September 7, 2022.

== Plot ==
In NYC, Jang Myong-jun, a leader of a North Korean terrorist organization, is captured and about to be transferred to Pyongyang, but the FBI officials are attacked by North Korean gangsters and Myong-jun escapes. Myong-jun sneaks into Seoul using a fake passport and also takes US$1 billion with the help of his partner Kim Chul-soo, an ex-agent and scientist.

Learning this, the North Korean government sends Im Cheol-ryong to Seoul again to catch Myong-jun and retrieve the money. Cheol-ryeong reunites with Kang Jin-tae and they begin the investigation, but the duo are interrupted by Jack, an FBI agent, who wishes to bring the North Korean criminals back to the U.S. on charges of killing FBI officials. They agree to work together and the operation is expanded to a trilateral collaboration of the Koreans and Americans.

At the hotel, Cheol-ryeong confesses that Myong-jun is his senior and an ex-North Korean agent. Jack tells that he received a mail from Adolf Bohrmann to catch Myong-jun 2 months ago and he suspected that Bohrmann's boss Michael Joe, a crime boss, is helping Myong-jun in money laundering, and Joe had betrayed Myong-jun to steal the money. The next morning, the trio decides to track Sergey, who is responsible for providing fake passport and illegal cell phones to Myong-jun and they follow his girlfriend Natasha, a Russian model. At night, Natasha goes out shopping and Jin-tae sneaks into her house to implant a bug, but is attacked by Sergey.

However, Jin-tae manages to defeat Sergey and brings him to the interrogation room, where they track the cell phone's location to Joe's club. The trio, along with Jin-tae's sister-in-law Park Min-young, infiltrate the club. Myong-jun meets Joe at the penthouse and demands him to return the money. When Joe refuses, Myong-jun kills him and Chul-soo as the latter is in cahoots with the FBI. Cheol-ryeong heads to the penthouse and manages to arrest Myong-jun.

Later at the North Korean delegation's residence, Cheol-ryeong finds that Bohrmann is actually a German scientist responsible for killing Jews in a gas leak accident. Cheol-ryeong informs it to Jack, who later learns that his boss is also in cahoots with Myong-jun. An assassin tries to kill Jack, but he manages to subdue him and learns that Jin-tae's family is being held by Myong-jun.

Jin-tae is forced to take Myong-jun's henchman into the residence to spread a virus on the residence radio tower. Myong-jun frees himself and kills his ex-superior Kim Jeong-teak, who is actually Bohrmann. is revealed to have hired Myeong-jun to steal the money. Jeong-teak is also responsible for the death of Myong-jun's family. Jack reaches Jin-tae's house and kills the attackers, thus saving the family. Cheol-ryeong and Jin-tae arrive and the two manage to defuse the virus bomb and kill Myong-jun.

In the aftermath, the money is delivered to UNICEF, while Cheol-ryeong proposes to Min-young before returning to North Korea.

== Cast ==
- Hyun Bin as Im Cheol-ryung, a detective from North Korea's special investigation team
- Yoo Hae-jin as Kang Jin-tae, a detective from South Korea and father of Kang Yeon-ah
- Im Yoon-ah as Park Min-young, sister-in-law of Kang Jin-tae
- Daniel Henney as Jack, an FBI agent
- Jin Seon-kyu as Jang Myung-jun, the leader of a North Korean criminal organization
- Jang Young-nam as Park So-yeon, wife of Kang Jin-tae
- Park Min-ha as Kang Yeon-ah, daughter of Kang Jin-tae
- Park Hyung-soo as NIS agent
- Lee Min-ji as NIS agent
- Park Hoon as Park Sang-wi, a member of a global organized crime syndicate.
- Lee Je-yeon as Oh Jong-goo, a cyber detective
- Jeon Bae-soo as Kim Jung-taek
- Kim Won-hae as Sergey
- Lim Seong-jae as Kim Sang-sa
- Lee Seung-hoon as Oh Deok, a cyber detective
- John D. Michaels as FBI director

== Production ==
=== Casting ===
On August 24, 2020, Hyun Bin and Yoo Hae-jin was reported to be in discussion to reprise their role as Im Cheol-ryung and Kang Jin-tae, respectively. On August 26, 2020, Daniel Henney was reported to be in discussion to join the cast. On August 28, 2020, Im Yoon-ah was reported to be in discussion to reprise her role as Park Min-young.

On January 22, 2021, Hyun Bin, Yoo Hae-jin, and Im Yoon-ah was confirmed to reprise their role. In addition, Daniel Henney and Jin Seon-kyu joined the cast.

On February 13, 2021, the script reading took place. On February 16, 2021, Park Min-ha was confirmed to reprise her role as Kang Yeon-ah, making it her first acting project in 5 years after its prequel. On February 19, 2021, Park Hyung-soo joined the cast. On February 26, 2021, Lee Min-ji joined the cast.

=== Filming ===
Filming began on February 18, 2021, and ended on June 13.

== Reception ==
=== Box office ===
The film was released on 2167 screens on September 7, 2022, in South Korea. The film surpassed 1 million admissions in 3 days of release and 2 million admissions in 5 days of release, achieving the milestone at twice the speed of its predecessor. On September 12, six days after its release, it became the fourth South Korean film in 2022 to cross 3 million admissions. On September 22, 16 days after its release, it became the third South Korean film in 2022 to cross 5 million admissions. On October 2, 26 days after its release, it surpassed 6 million admissions.

As of 22 October 2022, it is the third highest-grossing Korean film of 2022, with a gross of US$56,282,820, and 6,982,840 admissions.

=== Accolades ===
Award	Year	Category	Recipient(s)	Result	Ref.
Blue Dragon Film Awards	2022	Popular Star Award	Im Yoon-ah	Won	
Blue Dragon Film Awards	2022	Popular Star Award	Daniel Henney	Won	
Blue Dragon Film Awards	2022	Best Actress	Im Yoon-ah	Nominated	
Blue Dragon Film Awards	2022	Best Supporting Actor	Daniel Henney	Nominated	
Grand Bell Awards	2022	Best Supporting Actress	Im Yoon-ah	Won	
