= Blue Dragon Film Award for Best Short Film =

South Korean film awards

- Awarded for: Best Short Film
- Country: South Korea
- Presented by: Blue Dragon Film Awards
- First award: 1963
- Website: www.blueaward.co.kr

The Blue Dragon Film Award for Best Short Film is one of the awards that is presented annually at the Blue Dragon Film Awards by Sports Chosun, which is typically held at the end of the year.

== Winners ==
#	Year	Short film	Director
29	2008	The Unbearable Heaviness of Nagging (잔소리)	Choi Jeong-yeol (최정열)
30	2009	Gookgyeong (구경)	Kim Han-gyeol (김한결)
31	2010	Kkot-nim-yi (꽃님이)	Jung Dong-rak (정동락)
32	2011	Broken Night (부서진 밤)	Yang Hyo-joo (양효주)
33	2012	Night (밤)	Kang Won (강원)
34	2013	Mija (미자)	Jeon Hyo-jung (전효정)
35	2014	Mrs. Young (영희씨)	Bang Woo-ri (방우리)
36	2015	The Photographers (출사)	Yoo Jae-hyun (유재현)
37	2016	Summer Night (여름밤)	Lee Ji-won (이지원)
38	2017	Hand-Written Poster (대자보)	Kwak Eun-mi (곽은미)
39	2018	A New Record (신기록)	Heo Ji-eun (허지은), Lee Kyung-ho (이경호)
40	2019	Milk (밀크)	Jang Yoo-jin (장유진)
41	2020	The Thread (실)	Cho Min-jae (조민재), Lee Na-yeon (이나연)
42	2021	Motorcycle and Hamburger (오토바이어와 햄버거)	Choi Min-young (최민영)
43	2022	Light It Up at 2 AM (새벽 두시에 불을 붙여)	Yoo Jongseok (유종석)
44	2023	Ghwa the Last Name (과화만사성)	Yu Jae-in (유재인)
45	2024	Yurim (유림)	Song Ji-seo (송지서)
46	2025	Rotary’s Hancheol (로타리의 한철)	Kim So-yeon (김소연)

== General references ==
- "Winners and nominees lists". Blue Dragon Film Awards (in Korean). Archived from the original on 27 January 2022.
- "Blue Dragon Film Awards". Naver (in Korean).
