= Hommage (film) =

2022 South Korean film

- Theatrical release poster
- Hangul: 오마주
- RR: Omaju
- MR: Omaju
- Directed by: Shin Su-won
- Screenplay by: Shin Su-won
- Starring: Lee Jung-eun; Kwon Hae-hyo; Tang Jun-sang; Lee Joo-shil
- Production company: June Film
- Distributed by: Twin Plus Partners; Little Big Pictures
- Release dates: October 31, 2021 (Tokyo); May 26, 2022 (South Korea)
- Running time: 108 minutes
- Country: South Korea
- Language: Korean

Hommage (Korean: 오마주) is a 2021 South Korean drama film directed by Shin Su-won, starring Lee Jung-eun, Kwon Hae-hyo, Tang Jun-sang, and Lee Joo-shil. The film depicts a cinema time travel of a middle-aged film director that connects 1962 and 2022. It was released in theaters on May 26, 2022.

== Synopsis ==
Ji-wan (Lee Jung-eun), a middle-aged film director who is in a slump due to box office failures, crosses the present and the past while restoring the film The Female Judge by Hong Eun-won, a first-generation Korean female director who was active in the 1960s.

== Cast ==
- Lee Jung-eun as Ji-wan
- Kwon Hae-hyo as Ji-wan's husband
- Tang Jun-sang as Ji-wan's son
- Lee Joo-shil
- Kim Ho-jung (special appearance)

== Release ==
Hommage was invited to the International Competition section at the 34th Tokyo International Film Festival where it had its world premier on October 31, 2021. It was also invited to the 69th Sydney Film Festival, the 18th Glasgow Film Festival, the 23rd Jeonju International Film Festival, and 21st Tribeca Film Festival. It won the Jury Award, the highest award at the 20th Florence Korean Film Festival. It was released theatrically on May 26, 2022, in South Korea.

== Awards and nominations ==
Award	Year	Category	Recipient(s)	Result	Ref(s)
Asia Pacific Screen Awards	2022	Best Director	Shin Su-won	Nominated	
Asia Pacific Screen Awards	2022	Best Performance	Lee Jung-eun	Won	
Buil Film Awards	2022	Best Actress	Lee Jung-eun	Nominated	
Buil Film Awards	2022	Best Supporting Actor	Kwon Hae-hyo	Nominated	
Buil Film Awards	2022	Best New Actor	Tang Jun-sang	Nominated	
Chunsa Film Art Awards	2022	Best Director	Shin Su-won	Nominated	
Chunsa Film Art Awards	2022	Best Actress	Lee Jung-eun	Nominated	
Chunsa Film Art Awards	2022	Best New Actor	Tang Jun-sang	Nominated	
Grand Bell Awards	2022	Daejong Vision Award	Shin Su-won	Won	
Grand Bell Awards	2022	Best Director	Shin Su-won	Nominated	
Grand Bell Awards	2022	Best Actress	Lee Jung-eun	Nominated	
Grand Bell Awards	2022	Best New Actor	Tang Jun-sang	Nominated	
London Asian Film Festival	2022	Best Actress	Lee Jung-eun	Won	
Seoul International Women's Film Festival	2022	Park Nam-ok Award	Shin Su-won	Won	
Women in Film Korea Festival	2022	Female Filmmaker of the Year	Shin Su-won	Won	
Women in Film Korea Festival	2022	Best Actress	Lee Jung-eun	Won	
