= Jo Woo-jin (actor) =

South Korean actor (born 1979)

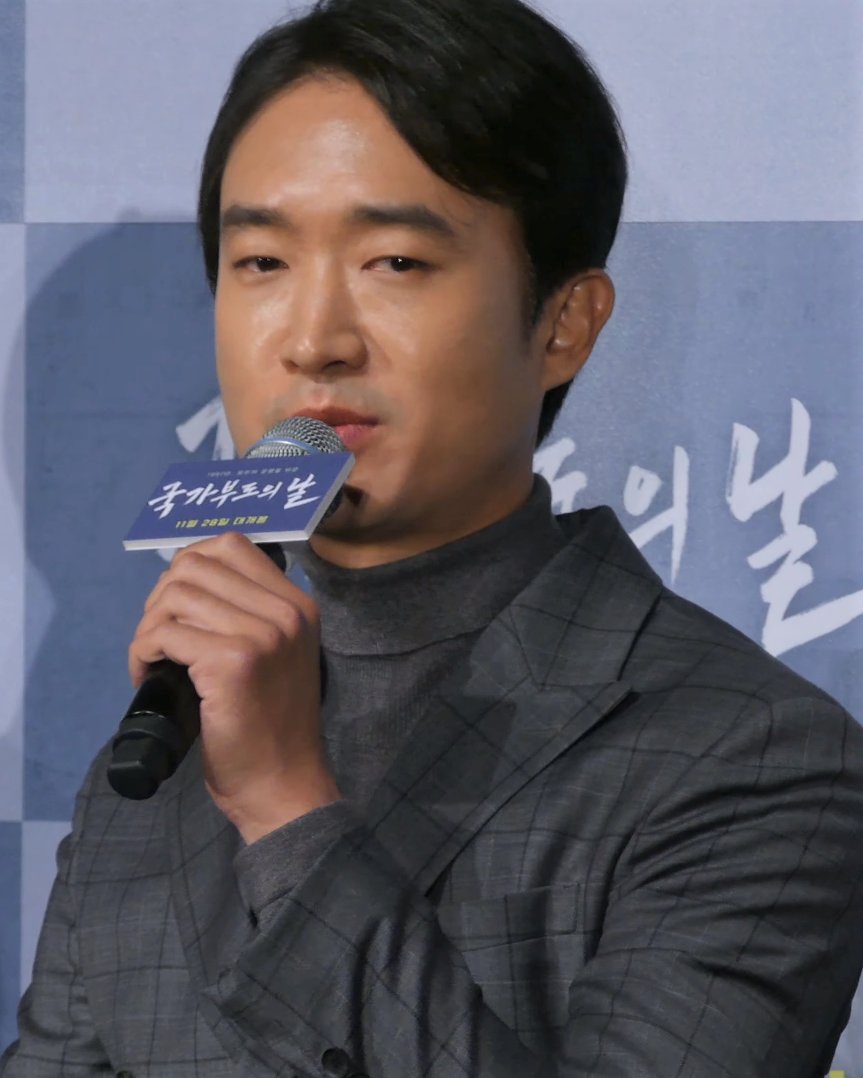
- Jo in May 2018
- Born: Jo Shin-je; January 16, 1979 (age 47); Daegu, South Korea
- Education: Seoul Institute of the Arts
- Occupation: Actor
- Years active: 1999–present
- Agent: Ace Factory
- Spouse: Unknown (m. 2018)

Korean name
- Hangul: 조신제
- RR: Jo Sinje
- MR: Cho Sinje

Stage name
- Hangul: 조우진
- Hanja: 趙祐鎮
- RR: Jo Ujin
- MR: Cho Ujin

Jo Shin-je (Korean: 조신제; born January 16, 1979), known professionally as Jo Woo-jin (Korean: 조우진), is a South Korean actor. He won the Best Supporting Actor award at the 40th Blue Dragon Film Awards in 2019 for his performance in the film Default (2018).

== Filmography ==
=== Film ===
Year	Title	Role	Notes	Ref.
2011	Mama			
2011	War of the Arrows	Qing messenger		
2012	Wonderful Radio			
2014	Venus Talk	PD Choi		
2015	Inside Men	Director Jo		
2016	Mood of the Day	Agency junior		
2017	One Line	Prosecutor Won		
2017	The King	Park Tae-soo's detective		
2017	The Sheriff in Town	Seon-cheol		
2017	Real	Sa Do-jin		
2017	V.I.P.	Public prosecutor		
2017	The Fortress	Jung Myung-soo		
2017	The Bros	Lee Mi-bong		
2017	Steel Rain	Choi Myung-rok		
2018	Rampant	Park Jong-sa		
2018	The Drug King	Jo Seong-kang		
2018	Default	Vice-minister of Finance		
2019	Trade Your Love	Section chief Seo		
2019	Money	Han Ji-cheol		
2020	Steel Rain 2: Summit	Voice of the South Korean submarine captain		
2020	Collectors	Dr. Jones		
2021	The Book of Fish	Byeol Jang	Cameo	
2021	Seo Bok	Assistant Manager, Korea Intelligence Agency		
2021	Hard Hit	Lee Seong-gyu		
2022	Kingmaker	Director Lee		
2022	Alienoid	Cheong-woon		
2022	Hunt	Moon Hyun-seok	Special appearance	
2022	Hero	Ma Do-sik	Special appearance	
2024	Alienoid: Return to the Future	Cheong-woon		
2024	Amazon Bullseye	Boss	Cameo	
2024	Harbin	Kim Sang-hyeon		
2025	The Match	Nam Ki-cheol	Special appearance	
2025	Boss	Na Soon-tae		
2025	Mantis	Dok-go		

=== Television series ===
Year	Title	Role	Notes	Ref.
2010	OB & GY			
2011	Warrior Baek Dong-soo	Ma Do-shik		
2012	Dr. Jin	Deuk-chil		
2012–2013	The King's Doctor	Baek Kwang-hyun		
2013	Incarnation of Money			
2013	Hur Jun, The Original Story	Woo Gong-bo		
2013	Gu Family Book	Jo Gwan-woong's soldier		
2013	Goddess of Marriage	Hye-Jung's brother-in-law		
2013	Medical Top Team	Doctor Lim		
2013–2014	Empress Ki	Wang Go's soldier		
2013–2014	One Well-Raised Daughter			
2013–2014	My Love from the Star	Heo-jun's assistant (Joseon era)		
2013–2014	Miss Korea	Dream Department Store Manager		
2014	Secret Door	Lee Dal-Sung		
2015	Make a Woman Cry			
2016	Squad 38	Ahn Tae-wook		
2016–2017	Guardian: The Lonely and Great God	Kim Do-young		
2017	Chicago Typewriter	Gal Ji-seok		
2017	Drama Stage – Chief B and the Love Letter	Shim Byung-sun		
2018	Mr. Sunshine	Im Gwan-soo		
2021	Happiness	Han Tae-suk		
2022	Narco-Saints	Byeon Ki-tae		
2024	Gangnam B-Side	Kang Dong-woo		
2025	Heavenly Ever After	Grim reaper	Cameo (episode 1)	
TBA	Knock-Off	Baek Jong-min		

=== Radio shows ===
Year	Title	Role	Notes	Ref.
2022	Bae Chul-soo's Music Camp	Special DJ	August 13–14	

=== Music videos appearances ===
Year	Title	Artist(s)	Ref.
2019	"MSG" (맵고짜고단거) feat. Penomeco	Dynamic Duo	
2023	"Golden Mask" (황금가면)	Kim Dong-ryul	
2025	'BOSS' (보스)	Dynamic Duo, TEAM BOSS	

== Awards and nominations ==
Name of the award ceremony, year presented, category, nominee of the award, and the result of the nomination
Award ceremony	Year	Category	Nominee / Work	Result	Ref.
Asia Contents Awards & Global OTT Awards	2023	Best Supporting Actor	Narco-Saints	Nominated	
Asian Academy Creative Awards	2023	Best Actor in A Supporting Role (National Winners – Korea)	Narco-Saints	Won	
Baeksang Arts Awards	2018	Best Supporting Actor	Steel Rain	Nominated	
Baeksang Arts Awards	2019	Best Supporting Actor	The Drug King	Nominated	
Baeksang Arts Awards	2022	Best Supporting Actor	Kingmaker	Won	
Baeksang Arts Awards	2023	Best Supporting Actor – Television	Narco-Saints	Won	
Baeksang Arts Awards	2025	Best Supporting Actor – Film	Harbin	Nominated	
Blue Dragon Film Awards	2016	Best New Actor	Inside Men	Nominated	
Blue Dragon Film Awards	2019	Best Supporting Actor	Default	Won	
Blue Dragon Series Awards	2023	Best Supporting Actor	Narco-Saints	Nominated	
Buil Film Awards	2018	Best Supporting Actor	1987: When the Day Comes	Nominated	
Buil Film Awards	2021	Best Supporting Actor	The Book of Fish	Nominated	
Buil Film Awards	2022	Best Supporting Actor	Kingmaker	Nominated	
Buil Film Awards	2025	Best Supporting Actor	Harbin	Nominated	
Chunsa Film Art Awards	2019	Best Supporting Actor	The Drug King	Nominated	
Chunsa Film Art Awards	2022	Best Supporting Actor	Kingmaker	Nominated	
Director's Cut Awards	2023	Best Actor in Television	Narco-Saints	Won	
Grand Bell Awards	2022	Best Supporting Actor	Kingmaker	Nominated	
Korean Association of Film Critics Awards	2022	Best Supporting Actor	Kingmaker, Hunt	Won	

=== Listicles ===
Name of publisher, year listed, name of listicle, and placement
Publisher	Year	Listicle	Placement	Ref.
Korean Film Council	2021	Korean Actors 200 (Note: Introduces 200 actors that best represent the present and future of Korean cinema to the people in the film industry all over the world)	Included	
