= The Girl on a Bulldozer =

2022 South Korean film

- Theatrical release poster
- Hangul: 불도저에 탄 소녀
- RR: Buldojeoe tan sonyeo
- MR: Puldojŏe t'an sonyŏ
- Directed by: Park Yi-woong
- Written by: Park Yi-woong
- Starring: Kim Hye-yoon; Park Hyuk-kwon; Oh Man-seok; Yesung; Park Si-woo
- Distributed by: Little Big Pictures
- Release date: April 7, 2022
- Running time: 112 minutes
- Country: South Korea
- Language: Korean
- Box office: $79,876

The Girl on a Bulldozer (Korean: 불도저에 탄 소녀; RR: Buldojeoe tan sonyeo) is a 2022 South Korean mystery film directed by Park Yi-woong, starring Kim Hye-yoon, Park Hyuk-kwon, Oh Man-seok, Yesung, and Park Si-woo. It tells the story of a daughter who digs up her father's whereabouts after a sudden accident. It was released theatrically on April 7, 2022.

== Synopsis ==
The film tells the story of a 19-year-old Goo Hye-young (Kim Hye-yoon) known as a troublemaker, who constantly gets into fights. For now, she must learn to control her anger and take a vocational training course. Then, she decided to learn how to drive a bulldozer, despite being told that it's a job closed off to women. With her tough image projected through her dragon tattoo, she channels most of her rage towards her father, Goo Bon-jin (Park Hyuk-kwon), who is a desperate restaurant owner caught in a cycle of drinking and gambling.

However, everything changes when Bon-jin gets into an accident and ends up in the hospital. Hye-young suddenly has no easy target to hate or blame for her existence and must face the fact that deep down she cares for her father. She must not only assume the responsibility of caring for her younger brother, but also uncover the mystery of how her father got into that accident.

== Cast ==
- Kim Hye-yoon as Goo Hye-young

A woman who is good at talking tough, but is actually burdened by the weight of her father's failings.

- Park Hyuk-kwon as Goo Bon-jin

A restaurant owner and Hye-young's father who ended up being comatose after a sudden accident.

- Oh Man-seok as Choi Young-hwan

A man who made Bon-jin promises he has no intention of keeping.

- Yesung as Go Yoo-seok

A detective in charge of Bon-jin's accident

- Park Si-woo as Goo Hye-jeok

Hye-young's younger brother.

- Choi Hee-jin as Kyung-jin
- Lee Hwi-jong as Eun-seok
- Shin Jae-hwi as Student

== Release ==
The Girl on a Bulldozer was first screened at 26th Busan International Film Festival in October 2021 and, received favourable reviews from critics, audiences and the press. It was also screened at 1st Ulsan International Film Festival in December 2021.

In 2022, it was screened at 17th Osaka Asian Film Festival, 20th Florence Korea Film Festival, 4th PyeongChang International Peace Film Festival, 21st New York Asian Film Festival, 28th Nancy International Film Festival, 22nd Kaohsiung Film Festival, 11th Korean Film Festival Frankfurt, and 6th Berlin Korean Independent Film Festival.

The film was then released in theaters on April 7, 2022.

== Reception ==
The film has received positive reviews and was nominated for Best Film at the Osaka Asian Film Festival.

Upon opening, it achieved remarkable success at the box office, securing the first position in the Korean independent film category, while also ranking seventh in the overall box office. The Girl on a Bulldozer then rose to the top 3 at the Korean independent film box office in 2022.

Moreover, upon its release on Netflix in Korea, the film made an impressive debut at number five and subsequently rise to the number one spot, maintaining its position for a week.

== Accolades ==
Name of the award ceremony, year presented, category, nominee of the award, and the result of the nomination
Award ceremony	Year	Category	Nominee	Result	Ref.
Baeksang Arts Awards	2023	Best New Actress – Film	Kim Hye-yoon	Nominated	
Baeksang Arts Awards	2023	Best New Director – Film	Park Yi-woong	Nominated	
Blue Dragon Film Awards	2022	Best New Actress	Kim Hye-yoon	Won	
Blue Dragon Film Awards	2022	Best New Director	Park Yi-woong	Nominated	
Buil Film Awards	2022	Best New Actress	Kim Hye-yoon	Nominated	
Chunsa Film Art Awards	2022	Best New Actress	Kim Hye-yoon	Nominated	
Director's Cut Awards	2023	Best New Actress	Kim Hye-yoon	Nominated	
Director's Cut Awards	2023	Best New Director	Park Yi-woong	Nominated	
Director's Cut Awards	2023	Vision Award	Park Yi-woong	Nominated	
Golden Cinematography Awards	2022	Jury's Special Award	Kim Hye-yoon	Won	
Grand Bell Awards	2022	Best New Actress	Kim Hye-yoon	Won	
Grand Bell Awards	2022	Best New Director	Park Yi-woong	Won	
Korean Film Producers Association Awards	2022	Best New Actress	Kim Hye-yoon	Won	
New York Asian Film Festival	2022	Rising Star Asia Award	Kim Hye-yoon	Won	
Osaka Asian Film Festival	2022	Best Film	Park Yi-woong	Nominated	
Wildflower Film Awards	2023	Feature Film Director Award	Park Yi-woong	Nominated	
Wildflower Film Awards	2023	Best New Actress	Kim Hye-yoon	Won	
Wildflower Film Awards	2023	Best New Director	Park Yi-woong	Nominated	
