= In Our Prime =

2022 South Korean film

- Theatrical release poster
- Hangul: 이상한 나라의 수학자
- Hanja: 異常한 나라의 數學者
- Lit.: Mathematician in Wonderland
- RR: Isanghan naraui suhakja
- MR: Isanghan naraŭi suhakcha
- Directed by: Park Dong-hoon
- Written by: Lee Yong-jae
- Produced by: Ha Jeong-wan
- Starring: Choi Min-sik; Kim Dong-hwi; Park Byung-eun; Park Hae-joon; Jo Yun-seo
- Cinematography: Park Hong-yeol
- Edited by: Kim Sun-min
- Music by: Lee Ji-soo
- Production company: Joy Rabbit
- Distributed by: Showbox
- Release date: March 9, 2022
- Running time: 117 minutes
- Country: South Korea
- Language: Korean
- Box office: US$4.1 million

In Our Prime (Korean: 이상한 나라의 수학자; lit. 'Mathematician in Wonderland') is a 2022 South Korean drama film directed by Park Dong-hoon. The film stars Choi Min-sik as a genius mathematician with a hidden past and Kim Dong-hwi as a student who is failing math. The supporting cast includes Park Byung-eun, Park Hae-joon, and Jo Yun-seo. The film was released theatrically on March 9, 2022.

== Plot ==
A genius mathematician, Lee Hak-sung, defects from North Korea in pursuit of academic freedom. To conceal his identity and past, he takes on the role of a security guard at an elite private high school, where only the top 1% of gifted students are admitted.

With his cold and stern demeanor, Hak-sung becomes the most avoided figure on campus. However, his life takes an unexpected turn when he meets Han Ji-woo, a struggling high school student who has given up on math. After discovering Hak-sung's true identity, Ji-woo persistently begs him to become his tutor.

As Hak-sung teaches Ji-woo not just how to find the right answers, but how to navigate the process of problem-solving, both of them experience an unexpected transformation in their lives.

== Cast ==
- Choi Min-sik as Lee Hak-sung, a school security guard and defector from North Korea
- Kim Dong-hwi as Han Ji-woo, a student who asks Hak-sung to teach him math
- Park Byung-eun as Kim Geun-ho, a math teacher
- Park Hae-joon as An Gi-cheol, agent of the National Intelligence Service who monitors Lee Hak-sung
- Jo Yun-seo as Park Bo-ram, Ji-woo's classmate
- Tang Jun-sang as Lee Tae-yeon, Hak-sung's son
- Kang Mal-geum as Han Ji-woo's mother
- Kim Hee-jung as Park Bo-ram's mother
- Joo Jin-mo as Oh Jeong-nam, a mathematician who participated in an international math competition with Hak-sung
- Kim Won-hae as Park Pil-ju, a North Korean defector and Economics professor

== Reception ==
=== Box office ===
As of 31 January 2023, the film has a gross of US$4,081,864, and 534,287 admissions.

=== Accolades ===
Award	Date of ceremony	Category	Recipient(s)	Result	Ref.
Baeksang Arts Awards	May 6, 2022	Best Director	Park Dong-hoon	Nominated	
Baeksang Arts Awards	May 6, 2022	Best Actor	Choi Min-sik	Nominated	
Baeksang Arts Awards	May 6, 2022	Best Screenplay	Lee Yong-jae	Nominated	
Baeksang Arts Awards	May 6, 2022	Best New Actor	Kim Dong-hwi	Nominated	
Chunsa Film Art Awards	September 30, 2022	Best New Actor	Kim Dong-hwi	Won	
Buil Film Awards	October 6, 2022	Best New Actor	Kim Dong-hwi	Nominated	
Busan Film Critics Awards	December 9, 2022	Best New Actor	Kim Dong-hwi	Won	
Grand Bell Awards	December 9, 2022	Best New Actor	Kim Dong-hwi	Nominated	
Blue Dragon Film Awards	November 25, 2022	Best New Actor	Kim Dong-hwi	Won	
