= Nothing Serious (film) =

2021 South Korean romance film

- Official release poster
- Hangul: 연애 빠진 로맨스
- Lit.: Romance Without Love
- RR: Yeonae ppajin romaenseu
- MR: Yŏnae ppajin romaensŭ
- Directed by: Jeong Ga-young
- Written by: Jeong Ga-young
- Produced by: Lee Jaemin; Im Eun-jeong
- Starring: Jeon Jong-seo; Son Suk-ku
- Cinematography: Lee Seong-jae
- Edited by: Nam Na-yeong
- Music by: Sunwoo Jung-a
- Production companies: CJ ENM; Twelve Journey
- Distributed by: CJ ENM
- Release date: November 24, 2021
- Running time: 95 minutes
- Country: South Korea
- Language: Korean
- Box office: US$5.2 million

Nothing Serious (Korean: 연애 빠진 로맨스; RR: Yeonae ppajin romaenseu; lit. 'Romance Without Love') is a 2021 South Korean romantic comedy film, written and directed by Jeong Ga-young for CJ ENM. Starring Jeon Jong-seo and Son Suk-ku, the film revolves around 32 years old Woo-ri (Son Seok-gu) and 28 years old Ja-young (Jeon Jong-seo), who hate being alone but have anxieties when it comes to dating. They meet with each other through a dating app. It was theatrically released on November 24, 2021.

== Synopsis ==
The film is about relationships in the digital age, fuses elements of traditional rom-coms with modern-day technology. The story follows two people of opposite sex who hate dating but feel lonely. It depicts their meeting with each other through a dating app.

== Cast ==
- Jeon Jong-seo as Ham Ja-young
- Son Suk-ku as Park Woo-ri
- Gong Min-jeung as Seon-bin
- Kim Seul-gi as Seon-bin's friend
- Kim Young-ok as Ja-young's grandmother
- Kim Jae-hwa as editor-in-chief of a magazine
- Bae Yoo-ram as Ja-young's best friend
- Im Sung-jae
- Kim Kwang-gyu as Ja-young's father

== Production ==
In September 2020 Jeon Jong-seo and Son Suk-ku were confirmed to play lead roles in the romance film to be written and directed by Jeong Ga-young.

== Release ==
The film was released theatrically on November 24, 2021.

On November 2, 2021, the director Jeong Ga-young released a parody video of a trailer on the global video platform TikTok. It became popular for its witty makeup and facial expressions. This unique way of promotion of the film attracted the Generation Z.

In July 2022, it was invited at the 21st New York Asian Film Festival, where it was screened at Lila Acheson Wallace Auditorium, Asia Society on July 31 for its New York premiere.

=== Home media ===
The film was made available for streaming on IPTV (Olleh TV, B TV, LG U+ TV), TVING, Naver TV, GOM Player, Google Play, One Store, and KakaoPage from December 17, 2021.

== Original soundtrack ==
Nothing Serious

Soundtrack album by Sunwoo Jung-a
- Released: December 9, 2021
- Genre: Soundtrack
- Length: 31:38
- Languages: Korean; English
- Labels: Genie Music; Stone Music Entertainment; CJ ENM

Released on December 9, 2021
No.	Title	Artist	Length
1.	"Wet Dream"	Sunwoo Jung-a	1:04
2.	"Funny Morning"	Sunwoo Jung-a	0:49
3.	"Whispers Between Us" (속닥속닥)	Sunwoo Jung-a	4:41
4.	"In the Office"	Sunwoo Jung-a, Jo Song-tae	1:42
5.	"Loser Collection"	Sunwoo Jung-a	1:29
6.	"Teaser of Love"	Sunwoo Jung-a	1:26
7.	"Interview"	Sunwoo Jung-a, Jo Song-tae	2.28
8.	"Typing, Friends"	Sunwoo Jung-a, Jo Song-tae	1:10
9.	"Izakaya Story"	Sunwoo Jung-a	5:01
10.	"Touch"	Sunwoo Jung-a	2:11
11.	"Dance in Love"	Sunwoo Jung-a	2:59
12.	"Flashback"	Sunwoo Jung-a	2:35
13.	"End of Dream"	Sunwoo Jung-a	1:28
14.	"Something Missing Between Us" (뭔가 빠진 사이)	Sunwoo Jung-a	2:35
Total length:			31:38

Songs not featured on the official soundtrack: (Note: The songs were listed in the closing credits of the film.)

- To My Boyfriend (내 남자친구에게) by Fin.K.L
- Some (썸) by Soyou and Junggigo featuring Lil Boi

== Reception ==
=== Box office ===
The film was released on 965 screens on November 24, 2021. As per Korean Film Council (Kofic) integrated computer network, the film ranks third on the Korean box office with 209,065 admissions on opening weekend. In its reverse run the film topped the Korean box office in its 3rd week of release garnering 529,469 admissions by 3rd weekend.

As of January 2, 2022 it is at 9th place among all the Korean films released in the year 2021, with gross of US$5.15 million and 604,672 admissions.

=== Critical response ===
Heo Min-nyeong of Newsen wrote that in the film "there is no room for boredom," in spite of the main leads hogging 80% of screen time. Heo stated that some sequences made him feel like "I'm watching the heyday of 'Sex and the City'." Kim Nara writing for My Daily praised the chemistry between lead pair Jeon Jong-seo and Son Suk-ku. She stated that the film gave satisfaction for performance as the actors have "acting ability and bouncing energy, which is enough to breathe life into the character and admire it." Kim appreciated the flow of narrative, as she said, "with the honesty and quirkyness of peeling off a single layer of wrapping paper without repeating the common romantic comedy, it 'hook' deeply to the emotional line beyond the hot stimulus." Kang Hyo-jin reviewing for Sports TV News wrote, "The film's strengths are its blatant honesty and provocative and witty lines." Praising the casting Kang stated, "The free-spirited and unstoppable images of Jeon Jong-seo and Son Seok-gu fit perfectly with the film's precarious love story". Concluding her review she opined, "It is the birth of a masterpiece of romance that combines character, humor, and trend reflection in a short time. Romance Without Love will be a work that is going to be talked about for a long time as a reference for a romance that empathizes with reality.

== Accolades ==
Year	Award	Category	Recipient(s)	Result	Ref.
2022	58th Baeksang Arts Awards	Best Film	Nothing Serious	Nominated	
2022	58th Baeksang Arts Awards	Best Director	Jeong Ga-young	Nominated	
2022	58th Baeksang Arts Awards	Best Actress	Jeon Jong-seo	Nominated	
2022	58th Baeksang Arts Awards	Best Screenplay	Jeong Ga-young and Wang Hye-ji	Won	
2022	58th Grand Bell Awards	Best Supporting Actress	Gong Min-jeung	Nominated	
