= In Front of Your Face =

2021 film

- Film poster
- Hangul: 당신 얼굴 앞에서
- RR: Dangsin eolgul apeseo
- MR: Tangsin ŏlgul ap'esŏ
- Directed by: Hong Sang-soo
- Written by: Hong Sang-soo
- Produced by: Hong Sang-soo; Kim Min-hee
- Starring: Lee Hye-young; Cho Yun-hee; Kwon Hae-hyo
- Cinematography: Hong Sang-soo
- Edited by: Hong Sang-soo
- Music by: Hong Sang-soo
- Production company: Jeonwonsa Film Co.
- Distributed by: The Cinema Guild
- Release dates: 15 July 2021 (Cannes); 7 October 2021 (BIFF); 21 October 2021 (South Korea)
- Running time: 85 minutes
- Country: South Korea
- Language: Korean
- Box office: $41,279

In Front of Your Face (Korean: 당신 얼굴 앞에서; RR: Dangsin eolgul apeseo) is a 2021 South Korean drama film written and directed by Hong Sang-soo. The film was selected to be shown in the Cannes Premiere section at the 2021 Cannes Film Festival.

== Plot ==
Sangok, a former actress (Lee Hye-young) returns to visit family in Seoul, South Korea from the U.S. and stays with her sister, Jeongok (Cho Yunhee), in a high-rise apartment. Her sister takes her to meet with her nephew, Seungwon (Shin Seok-ho), who has a rice cake business and then visits her old house before she meets with a director looking for her to join him on a project. The director, Song Jaewon (Kwon Hae-hyo), has no immediate project but admires her work from decades ago. They meet at a cafe where they eat and drink at lot whereby she makes a confession about wanting to work as soon as possible.

== Cast ==
- Lee Hye-young as Sang ok
- Jo Yoon-hee as Jeong ok
- Kwon Hae-hyo as Jae won
- Shin Seok-ho as Seung-won
- Kim Sae-byuk as old house owner
- Ha Seong-guk as assistant director
- Seo Young-hwa as passerby
- Lee Eun-mi as passerby
- Kang Yi-seo as Seung-won's girlfriend

== Release and reception ==
The film was selected for screening in the 'Icon' category at 26th Busan International Film Festival, held from 6 to 15 October 2021.

The review aggregator website Rotten Tomatoes reported a 93% approval rating, based on 14 reviews with an average rating of 7.70/10.

== Accolades ==
Year	Award	Category	Recipient(s)	Result	Ref.
2021	59th Gijón International Film Festival	Albar Special Jury Award	In Front of Your Face	Won	
2021	59th Gijón International Film Festival	Albar Best Feature Film	In Front of Your Face	Nominated	
2021	Cine21 Awards	Best Film of the Year	In Front of Your Face	Won	
2022	19th International Cinephile Society Awards	Best Picture	In Front of Your Face	13th runner-up	
2022	19th International Cinephile Society Awards	Best Actress	Lee Hye-young	Won	
2022	58th Baeksang Arts Awards	Best Actress	Lee Hye-young	Won	
2022	9th Wildflower Film Awards	Best Actress	Lee Hye-young	Nominated	
2022	9th Wildflower Film Awards	Best Director	Hong Sang-soo	Nominated	
2022	27th Chunsa Film Art Awards	Best Director	Hong Sang-soo	Nominated	
2022	27th Chunsa Film Art Awards	Best Actress	Lee Hye-young	Nominated	
2022	31st Buil Film Awards	Best Film	In Front of Your Face	Nominated	
2022	31st Buil Film Awards	Best Director	Hong Sang-soo	Nominated	
2022	31st Buil Film Awards	Best Actress	Lee Hye-young	Nominated	
2022	58th Grand Bell Awards	Best Director	Hong Sang-soo	Nominated	
2022	58th Grand Bell Awards	Best Actress	Lee Hye-young	Nominated	
2022	23rd Busan Film Critics Awards	Grand Prize	In Front of Your Face	Won	
2022	23rd Busan Film Critics Awards	Best Actress	Lee Hye-young	Won	
