= Life Is Beautiful (2022 film) =

South Korean jukebox musical road film

- Theatrical release poster
- Hangul: 인생은 아름다워
- RR: Insaengeun areumdawo
- MR: Insaengŭn arŭmdawŏ
- Directed by: Choi Kook-hee
- Written by: Bae Se-yeong
- Produced by: Park Eun-kyung
- Starring: Ryu Seung-ryong; Yum Jung-ah; Park Se-wan; Ong Seong-wu
- Cinematography: Back Yoon-seuk
- Edited by: Yang Jin-mo
- Music by: Kim Joon-seok
- Production company: The Lamp
- Distributed by: Lotte Entertainment
- Release date: September 28, 2022
- Running time: 122 minutes
- Country: South Korea
- Language: Korean
- Box office: US$8.5 million

Life Is Beautiful (Korean: 인생은 아름다워; RR: Insaengeun areumdawo) is a 2022 South Korean musical comedy-drama film directed by Choi Kook-hee and starring Yum Jung-ah, Ryu Seung-ryong, Park Se-wan and Ong Seong-wu. The film is about a woman, Oh Se-yeon, who makes an absurd request to find her first love as a birthday present, and her husband, Jin-bong, who reluctantly goes on a trip with her across the country. The film had its premiere at 36th Fribourg International Film Festival on March 19, 2022, and was released in theaters on September 28, 2022 in South Korea.

== Plot ==
Se-yeon, who has dedicated herself to her blunt husband Jin-bong and their indifferent children, realizes that she does not have much time left. Saddened by a life filled with uncertainty and unfulfilled dreams, she makes an unusual request for her final birthday to find her first love, who suddenly came to mind, as her last birthday present.

Reluctantly, Jin-bong agrees to embark on this quest, driven by his wife's insistence. With nothing but three names and no real leads, the couple sets off on a journey across the country. As they bicker and banter along the way, they also rediscover the precious moments of their shared past.

== Cast ==
- Ryu Seung-ryong as Kang Jin-bong
- Yum Jung-ah as Oh Se-yeon
  - Park Se-wan as young Oh Se-yeon
- Ong Seong-wu as Jeong-woo
- Yang Hee-kyung as Dong-tan
- Park Yeong-gyu as Jin-bong's father
- Shim Dal-gi as Hyeon-jeong
  - Yeom Hye-ran as adult Hyeon-jeong
- Ha Hyun-sang as Seo Jin
- Kim Hye-ok as Jin-bong's mother
- Ko Chang-seok as Office manager
- Jeon Moo-song as Grandfather Choi
- Shin Shin-ae as Aunt Dong-tan
- Kim Jong-soo as Teacher
- Kim Sun-young as Park Jeong-ah
- Ryu Hyun-kyung as Ye-jin's teacher
- Kim Da-in as Ye-jin
- Lee Won-hee as dancer
- Yuk Sim-hwan as dancer
- Kang Seung-wan

== Production ==
=== Theme ===
The film is a road film in which two people wife and husband wander across the country in search of wife's first love, It has music that fits their stories from childhood to the present. It is the first jukebox musical in South Korea, containing familiar popular songs from the 1970s to 2000s.

=== Filming ===
The filming began on October 14, 2019 and it was wrapped up on February 6, 2020.

== Release ==
Life Is Beautiful had its premiere at 36th Fribourg International Film Festival on March 19, 2022.

The film was scheduled to be released in theaters in December 2020, but was postponed due to COVID-19 pandemic. It was released on September 28, 2022.

== Accolades ==
Award	Year	Category	Recipient(s)	Result	Ref.
Baeksang Arts Awards	2023	Best Actress – Film	Yum Jung-ah	Nominated	
Baeksang Arts Awards	2023	Best New Actor – Film	Ong Seong-wu	Nominated	
Blue Dragon Film Awards	2022	Best Actress	Yum Jung-ah	Nominated	
Blue Dragon Film Awards	2022	Best New Actor	Ong Seong-wu	Nominated	
Blue Dragon Film Awards	2022	Best Art Direction	Son Min-jung, Kim Young-bok	Nominated	
Blue Dragon Film Awards	2022	Best Music	Kim Joon-seok	Nominated	
Buil Film Awards	2023	Best Music	Kim Joon-seok	Nominated	
Director's Cut Awards	2023	Best Actress	Yum Jung-ah	Nominated	
Grand Bell Awards	2022	Best Actor	Ryu Seung-ryong	Nominated	
Grand Bell Awards	2022	Best Actress	Yum Jung-ah	Won	
Grand Bell Awards	2022	Best New Actor	Ong Seong-wu	Nominated	
Grand Bell Awards	2022	Best Costume Design	Choi Se-yeon	Nominated	
Grand Bell Awards	2022	Best Music	Kim Joon-seok	Won	
Grand Bell Awards	2022	New Wave Award	Ong Seong-wu	Won	
Korea Culture and Entertainment Awards	2022	Excellence Award, Actress Film	Shim Dal-gi	Won	
Vevey International Funny Film Festival	2022	Audience Award	Life Is Beautiful	Won	
