= Hot Blooded (film) =

2022 South Korean film

- Theatrical poster
- Hangul: 뜨거운 피
- Lit.: The Boiling Blood
- RR: Tteugeoun pi
- MR: Ttŭgŏun p'i
- Directed by: Cheon Myeong-kwan
- Written by: Cheon Myoung-kwan
- Based on: Hot Blooded by Kim Un-su
- Produced by: Kim Ju-gyeong
- Starring: Jung Woo; Kim Kap-soo; Choi Moo-sung; Ji Seung-hyun; Lee Hong-nae
- Cinematography: Gang Guk-hyeon
- Edited by: Kim Chang-ju
- Music by: Yoon Il-sang
- Production company: Gorae Pictures
- Distributed by: Studio dhL; Kidari Studio
- Release date: March 23, 2022
- Running time: 120 minutes
- Country: South Korea
- Language: Korean
- Box office: est. US$2.88 million

Hot Blooded (Korean: 뜨거운 피; RR: Tteugeoun pi, The Boiling Blood) is a 2022 South Korean crime film directed by Cheon Myeong-kwan, and based on the 2016 novel of the same name by Kim Un-su. The film starring Choi Moo-sung, Kim Dong-hwi, Park Byung-eun, Park Hae-joon and Jo Yun-seo. It was released theatrically on March 23, 2022.

== Cast ==
- Jung Woo as Park Hee-soo
- Kim Kap-soo as Son
- Choi Moo-sung as Yong-gang
- Ji Seung-hyun as Chul-jin
- Lee Hong-nae as Ah-mi
- Yoon Ji-hye as In-sook
- Baek Soo-hee as Jenny
- Lee Sung-woo as Jung-bae
- Jung Yung-joo as Madam Yoon

== Awards and nominations ==
Year	Award	Category	Recipient	Result	Ref.
2022	58th Baeksang Arts Awards	Best Actor	Jung Woo	Nominated	
2022	58th Baeksang Arts Awards	Best New Actor	Lee Hong-nae	Won	
2022	27th Chunsa Film Art Awards	Best New Actor	Lee Hong-nae	Nominated	
2022	31st Buil Film Awards	Best New Actor	Lee Hong-nae	Nominated	
2022	58th Grand Bell Awards	Best New Actor	Lee Hong-nae	Nominated	
