= New Millennium Hall, Konkuk University =

University auditorium in Seoul, South Korea

New Millennium Hall
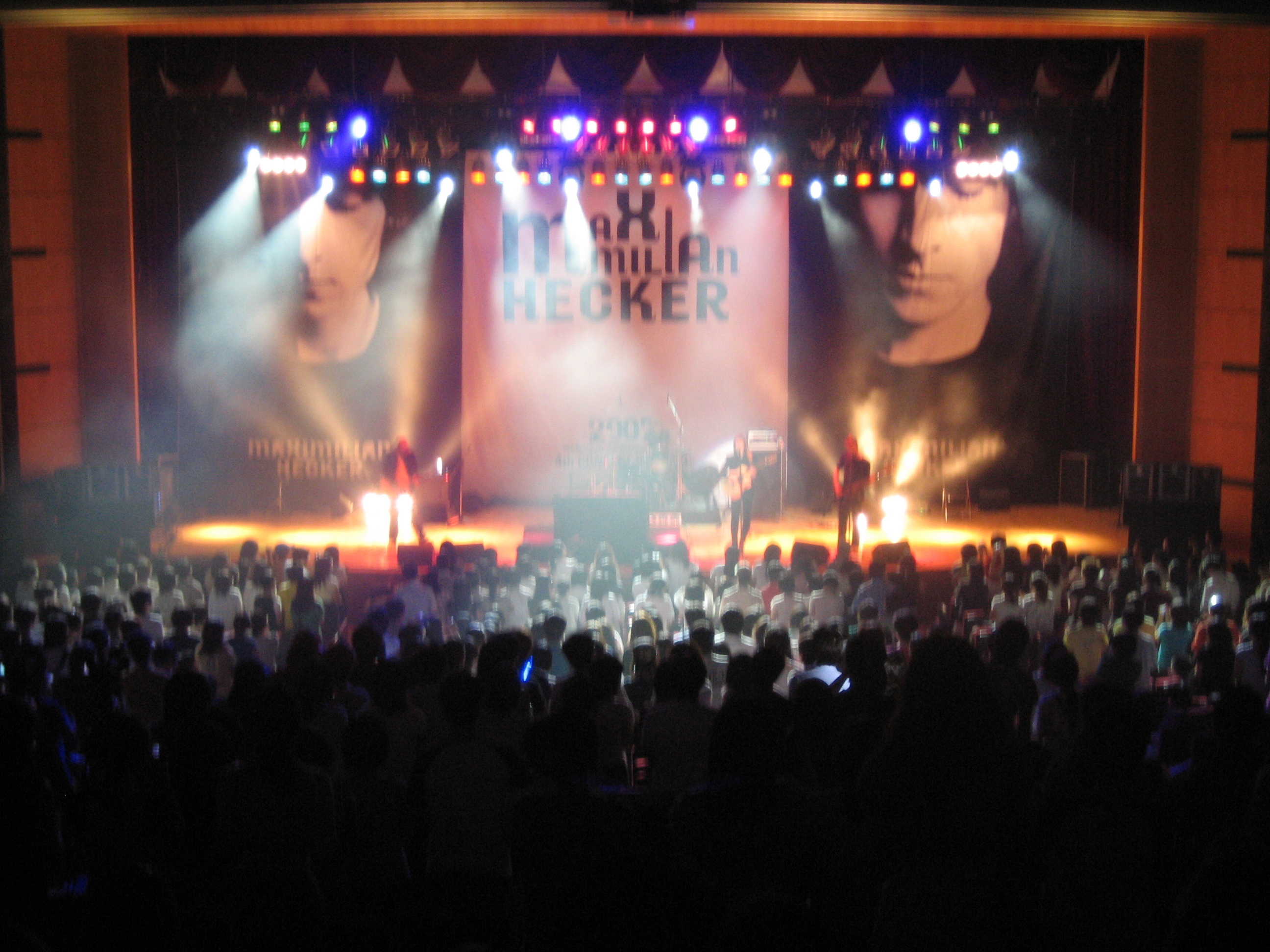
- A concert in 2007
- Interactive map of New Millennium Hall
- Location: Seoul, South Korea
- Coordinates: 37°32′31″N 127°04′35″E
- Owner: Konkuk University
- Capacity: 800

Construction
- Opened: 2000

The New Millennium Hall (Korean: 새천년기념관 also KonKuk University New Millennium Hall 건국대학교 새천년관 대공연장 and Konkuk University's Millennium Hall) It is the name given to a multipurpose structure located in North Chungcheong Province in the city of Seoul, capital of South Korea. It is a university auditorium, university administrative building and concert hall. It is a privately owned facility that is part of the Konkuk University campus (건국대학교) and has been used over the years for numerous events, concerts, cultural conferences and student activities and more. New Millennium Hall is situated nearby to International House, and close to University Residence C.

The Seoul campus is adjacent to the Konkuk University Station, which is serviced by Seoul Subway Line 2 and Line 7. The circular Line 2 offers access to downtown Seoul within one hour. Line 7 links the northern part of the city to the popular Gangnam District.

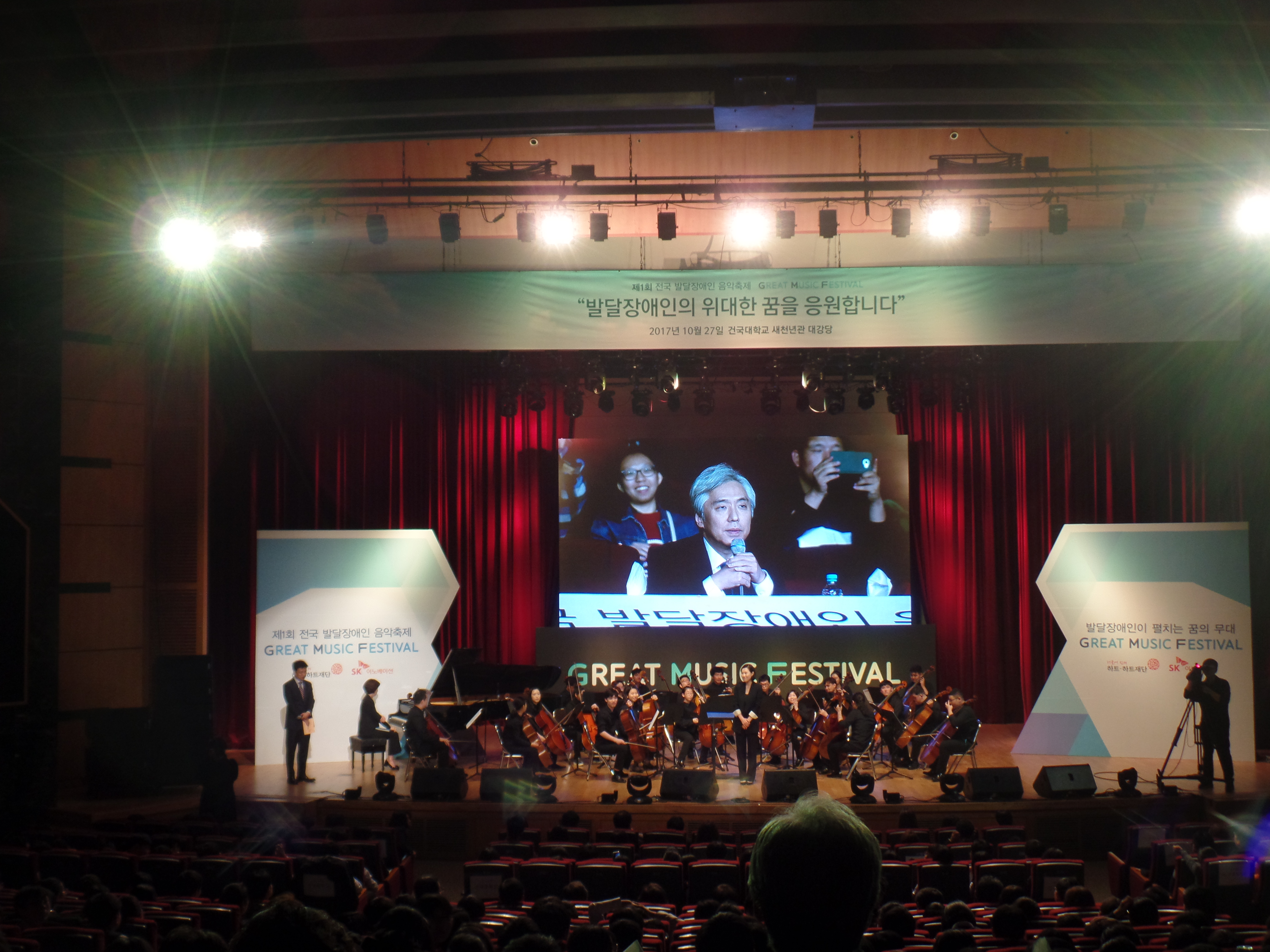
1st National Developmental Disability Music Festival in Konkuk University New Millennium Hall

In 2017, the first National Developmental Disability Music Festival congress was held here. In 2022, the TV production subsidiary GMMTV (linked to the Thai GMM Grammy Group) announced that the first Ohm and Nanon fan meeting in Korea would be held at this venue.

== See also ==
- Jamsil Arena
- Jangchung Arena
