= Perhaps Love (2021 film) =

2021 South Korean romantic comedy film

- Theatrical release poster
- Hangul: 장르만 로맨스
- Lit.: Genre Romance
- RR: Jangneuman romaenseu
- MR: Changnŭman romaensŭ
- Directed by: Jo Eun-ji
- Written by: Kim Na-deul
- Produced by: Baek Gyeong-suk
- Starring: Ryu Seung-ryong; Oh Na-ra; Kim Hee-won; Lee Yoo-young; Sung Yoo-bin; Mu Jin-sung
- Cinematography: Kim Tae-su
- Edited by: Kim Tae-kyung
- Music by: Lee Dong-june
- Production companies: Bleaf Co., Ltd. Library Pictures International
- Distributed by: Next Entertainment World
- Release date: November 17, 2021
- Running time: 113 minutes
- Country: South Korea
- Language: Korean
- Box office: US$4.3 million

Perhaps Love (Korean: 장르만 로맨스; RR: Jangneuman romaenseu) is a 2021 South Korean comedy-drama film, directed by Jo Eun-ji. Starring Ryu Seung-ryong, Oh Na-ra and Kim Hee-won, the film depicts the complex private life of a best-selling author whose work and life go awry as he meets people involved in an unusual romance. The film was released theatrically on November 17, 2021.

== Plot ==
A divorcing couple, a secret relationship on the brink of collapse, a reversed teacher-student dynamic, a mysterious neighbor, and a cousin all become entangled in an unusual romance. The intertwined lives of these individuals slowly come to light.

== Cast ==
- Ryu Seung-ryong as Kim Hyeon, a best-selling author who has fallen into a slump
- Oh Na-ra as Mi-ae, Hyeon's ex-wife
- Kim Hee-won as Soon-mo, Hyeon's best friend and the head of a Sunmo publishing company
- Lee Yoo-young as Jeong-won, Hyeon's neighbor
- Sung Yoo-bin as Kim Seong-kyeong, Hyeon and Mi-ae's son
- Mu Jin-sung as Yoo-jin, an aspiring author
- Oh Jung-se as Nam-jin, an ex-best friend and rival writer of best-seller Hyeon
- Ryu Hyun-kyung as Hye-jin, Hyeon's current wife

== Production ==
Perhaps Love is the directorial debut of actress Jo Eun-ji. On May 2, 2019, it was revealed that Ryu Seung-ryong has been cast in upcoming comedy film tentatively titled as 'Not the Lips'.

Filming began on June 4, 2019, and was wrapped up on September 13. The film was released 2 years after its completion.

== Release ==
The film was released theatrically on November 17, 2021. In April 2022 the film was invited at the 24th edition of Far East Film Festival at Udine held from April 22 to 30 2022. In July 2022, it was invited at the 21st New York Asian Film Festival, where it was screened at Lincoln center on July 26.

== Reception ==
=== Box office ===
The film was released on November 17, 2021, on 1192 screens. As per Korean Film Council (Kofic) integrated computer network, the film ranked first on the Korean box office in the opening weekend.

As of December 16, 2021 it is at 10th place among all the Korean films released in the year 2021, with gross of US$4.36 million and 514,260 admissions.

=== Critical response ===
Bae Hyo-joo reviewing for Newsen praised performances of Ryu Seung-ryong, Oh Nara and Kim Hee-won and wrote, "Perhaps Love evokes sympathy and laughter from viewers. The actors' sincere acting, witty yet realistic dialogues and scenes, and witty directing bring about 100% pure pleasure in a long time."

== Accolades ==
Year	Award	Category	Recipient(s)	Result	Ref.
2022	58th Baeksang Arts Awards	Best New Director	Jo Eun-ji	Won	
2022	58th Baeksang Arts Awards	Best Supporting Actor	Sung Yoo-bin	Nominated	
2022	58th Baeksang Arts Awards	Best Supporting Actress	Oh Na-ra	Nominated	
2022	58th Baeksang Arts Awards	Best New Actor	Mu Jin-sung	Nominated	
2022	21st New York Asian Film Festival	Uncaged Award for Best Feature Film Competition	Perhaps Love	Nominated	
2022	21st New York Asian Film Festival	Best from the East Award	Ryu Seung-ryong	Won	
2022	21st New York Asian Film Festival	Audience Award	Perhaps Love	Won	
2022	Chunsa Film Art Awards 2022	Best New Director	Jo Eun-ji	Nominated	
2022	Chunsa Film Art Awards 2022	Best Supporting Actress	Oh Na-ra	Won	
2022	Chunsa Film Art Awards 2022	Best New Actor	Mu Jin-Sung	Won	
2022	31st Buil Film Awards	Best New Director	Jo Eun-ji	Nominated	
2022	31st Buil Film Awards	Best Music	Lee Dong-june	Nominated	
2022	58th Grand Bell Awards	Best Supporting Actor	Kim Hee-won	Nominated	
2022	58th Grand Bell Awards	Best Supporting Actress	Oh Na-ra	Nominated	
2022	58th Grand Bell Awards	Best New Director	Jo Eun-ji	Nominated	
2022	58th Grand Bell Awards	Best New Actor	Mu Jin-sung	Won	
