= 58th Baeksang Arts Awards =

2022 edition of award ceremony

- Official poster
- Date: May 6, 2022
- Site: KINTEX, Ilsanseo-gu, Gyeonggi Province
- Hosted by: Shin Dong-yup; Bae Suzy; Park Bo-gum
- Organised by: JoongAng Group

Highlights
- Most wins: Film: Kingmaker (3); Escape from Mogadishu (3); Television: D.P. (3); Squid Game (3)
- Most nominations: Film: Escape from Mogadishu (7); Television: Squid Game (8)
- Grand Prize – Film: Ryoo Seung-wan (director) – Escape from Mogadishu
- Grand Prize – TV: Squid Game
- Website: Baeksang Arts Awards

Television/radio coverage
- Network: JTBC; TikTok (international)

The 58th Baeksang Arts Awards (Korean: 제58회 백상예술대상) ceremony, organised by JoongAng Group, was held on May 6, 2022, at KINTEX, Ilsanseo-gu, Gyeonggi Province, beginning at 7:45 p.m. KST. The event was hosted by Shin Dong-yup, Bae Suzy and Park Bo-gum and was broadcast live in South Korea by JTBC and internationally by TikTok. For the first time in two years, it was held with an on-site audience. The annual awards ceremony is one of South Korea's most prestigious award shows, recognizing excellence in film, television, and theatre.

The nominees were announced on April 11, 2022, via its official website. All works released between April 12, 2021, and March 31, 2022, were eligible for nominations. (Note: At least four episodes of a series online or offline needed to have been available by March 31, or else one-third of the entire series.) The final candidates for Grand Prize – Film were film Escape from Mogadishu and its director Ryoo Seung-wan.

The highest honors of the night, Grand Prize (Daesang), were awarded to director Ryoo Seung-wan of Escape from Mogadishu in the film division and drama Squid Game in the television division. Escape from Mogadishu and Kingmaker were the most winning films with three awards each, while D.P. and Squid Game also had the most wins of three in the television division. Lee Jun-ho and Kim Tae-ri became the most awarded individuals of the night; Lee won awards for Best Actor – Television and Most Popular Actor for The Red Sleeve while Kim won Best Actress – Television and Most Popular Actress for Twenty-Five Twenty-One.

== Winners and nominees ==
- Winners will be listed first and emphasized in **bold**.
  - Nominees

=== Film ===
**Grand Prize**	**Best Film**
**Ryoo Seung-wan (director) – Escape from Mogadishu**; Escape from Mogadishu	**Escape from Mogadishu**; Kingmaker; Miracle: Letters to the President; Sewing Sisters; Nothing Serious
**Best Director**	**Best New Director**
**Byun Sung-hyun – Kingmaker**; Ryoo Seung-wan – Escape from Mogadishu; Park Dong-hoon – In Our Prime; Lee Jang-hoon – Miracle: Letters to the President; Jeong Ga-young – Nothing Serious	**Jo Eun-ji – Perhaps Love**; Kim Chang-ju – Hard Hit; Namkoong Seon – Ten Months; Pil Kam-sung – Hostage: Missing Celebrity; Hong Sung-eun – Aloners
**Best Actor**	**Best Actress**
**Sul Kyung-gu – Kingmaker as Kim Woon-beom**; Kim Yoon-seok – Escape from Mogadishu as Han Sin-seong; Lee Sun-kyun – Kingmaker as Seo Chang-dae; Jung Woo – Hot Blooded as Park Hee-so; Choi Min-sik – In Our Prime as Lee Hak-sung	**Lee Hye-young – In Front of Your Face as Sang-ok**; Go Doo-shim – Everglow as Jin-ok; Park So-dam – Special Delivery as Jang Eun-ha; Lim Yoona – Miracle: Letters to the President as Song Ra-hee; Jeon Jong-seo – Nothing Serious as Ham Ja-young
**Best Supporting Actor**	**Best Supporting Actress**
**Jo Woo-jin – Kingmaker as Director Lee**; Koo Kyo-hwan – Escape from Mogadishu as Tae Joon-ki; Park Yong-woo – Spiritwalker as Director Park; Sung Yoo-bin – Perhaps Love as Kim Sung-kyung; Huh Joon-ho – Escape from Mogadishu as Rim Yong-su	**Lee Soo-kyung – Miracle: Letters to the President as Jung Bo-kyung**; Kim So-jin – Escape from Mogadishu as Kim Myung-hee; Kim Jae-hwa – Escape from Mogadishu as Jo Soo-jin; Shim Dal-gi – Snowball as Ah-ram; Oh Na-ra – Perhaps Love as Mi-ae
**Best New Actor**	**Best New Actress**
**Lee Hong-nae – Hot Blooded as Ah-mi**; Kim Dong-hwi – In Our Prime as Han Ji-woo; Kim Jae-beom – Hostage: Missing Celebrity as Choi Ki-wan; Moo Jin-sung – Perhaps Love as Yoo-jin; Jung Jae-kwang – Not Out as Shin Gwang-ho	**Lee Yoo-mi – Young Adult Matters as Yoon Se-jin**; Gong Seung-yeon – Aloners as Ji-na; Bang Min-ah – Snowball as Kang-i; Seohyun – Love and Leashes as Jung Ji-woo; Choi Sung-eun – Ten Months as Choi Mi-rae
**Best Screenplay**	**Technical Award**
**Jeong Ga-young, Wang Hye-ji – Nothing Serious**; Namkoong Sun – Ten Months; Ryoo Seung-wan, Lee Gi-cheol – Escape from Mogadishu; Byun Sung-Hyun, Kim Min-soo – Kingmaker; Lee Yong-jae – In Our Prime	**Choi Young-hwan (Cinematography) – Escape from Mogadishu**; Kang Jong-ik, Seo Byung-cheol (VFX) – The Pirates: The Last Royal Treasure; Cho Hyung-rae (Cinematography) – Kingmaker; Choi Seong-gyeom (Stunt direction) – Special Cargo; Han Ah-reum (Art direction) – Kingmaker

==== Films with multiple nominations ====
The following films received multiple nominations:

Nominations	Films
7	Escape from Mogadishu
6	Kingmaker
4	Miracle: Letters to the President
4	Nothing Serious
4	Perhaps Love
4	In Our Prime
3	Ten Months
2	Special Cargo
2	Hostage: Missing Celebrity
2	Hot Blooded
2	Aloners

==== Films with multiple awards ====
The following films received multiple awards:

Wins	Films
3	Escape from Mogadishu
3	Kingmaker

=== Television ===
**Grand Prize**
**Squid Game (drama) (Netflix)**
**Best Drama**	**Best Director**
**D.P. (Netflix)**; Twenty-Five, Twenty-One (tvN); Squid Game (Netflix); The Red Sleeve (MBC); Political Fever (Wavve)	**Hwang Dong-hyuk – Squid Game**; Yoon Sung-ho – Political Fever; Lee Na-jung – Mine; Jung Ji-in – The Red Sleeve; Han Jun-hee – D.P.
**Best Entertainment Program**	**Best Educational Show**
**Street Woman Fighter (Mnet)**; Shooting Stars (SBS); Single's Inferno (Netflix); You Quiz on the Block (tvN); Transit Love (TVING)	**Docu Insight: National Representative (KBS)**; Great Minds (EBS); Story of the Day When You Bite Your Tail season 3 (SBS); My Golden Kids (Channel A); Kiss the Universe (KBS)
**Best Actor**	**Best Actress**
**Lee Jun-ho – The Red Sleeve as Yi San, King Jeongjo of Joseon**; Kim Nam-gil – Through the Darkness as Song Ha-young; Lee Jung-jae – Squid Game as Seong Gi-hun; Im Si-wan – Tracer as Hwang Dong-joo; Jung Hae-in – D.P. as Ahn Jun-ho	**Kim Tae-ri – Twenty-Five, Twenty-One as Na Hee-do**; Kim Hye-soo – Juvenile Justice as Shim Eun-seok; Park Eun-bin – The King's Affection as Crown Prince Lee Hwi / Dam-yi / Yeon-seon; Lee Se-young – The Red Sleeve as Seong Deok-im, Royal Noble Consort Uibin Seong; Han So-hee – My Name as Yoon Ji-woo / Oh Hye-jin
**Best Supporting Actor**	**Best Supporting Actress**
**Cho Hyun-chul – D.P. as Cho Seok-bong**; Lee Deok-hwa – The Red Sleeve as King Yeongjo of Joseon; Lee Hak-joo – Political Fever as Kim Soo-jin; Lee Hyun-wook – Mine as Han Ji-yong; Heo Sung-tae – Squid Game as Jang Deok-su	**Kim Shin-rok – Hellbound as Park Jeong-ja**; Kang Mal-geum – Thirty-Nine as Cha Mi-hyun; Kim Joo-ryoung – Squid Game as Han Mi-nyeo; Ok Ja-yeon – Mine as Kang Ja-kyung; Jang Hye-jin – The Red Sleeve as Court Lady Seo
**Best New Actor**	**Best New Actress**
**Koo Kyo-hwan – D.P. as Han Ho-yul**; Shin Seung-ho – D.P. as Hwang Jang-soo; Yoo In-soo – All of Us Are Dead as Yoon Gwi-nam; Choi Hyun-wook – Twenty-Five, Twenty-One as Moon Ji-woong; Tang Jun-sang – Racket Boys as Yoon Hae-kang	**Kim Hye-jun – Inspector Koo as K / Song Yi-kyung**; Lee Yeon – Juvenile Justice as Baek Seong-woo; Lee Yoo-mi – All of Us Are Dead as Lee Na-yeon; Jung Ho-yeon – Squid Game as Kang Sae-byeok; Cho Yi-hyun – All of Us Are Dead as Choi Nam-ra
**Best Male Variety Performer**	**Best Female Variety Performer**
**Lee Yong-jin**; Kim Gu-ra; Moon Se-yoon; Jo Se-ho; Key	**Joo Hyun-young**; Song Eun-i; Lee Mi-joo; Lee Eun-ji; Hong Jin-kyung
**Best Screenplay**	**Technical Award**
**Kim Min-seok – Juvenile Justice**; Kim Hong-ki, Park Nu-ri, Choi Sung-jin, Yoon Sung-ho – Political Fever; Baek Mi-kyung – Mine; Lee Na-eun – Our Beloved Summer; Hwang Dong-hyuk – Squid Game	**Jung Jae-il (Music) – Squid Game**; Kwon Tae-eun (Music) – King of Mask Singer, Sing Again season 2, Poongryu, Superband season 2; Kim Hwa-young (Cinematography) – The Red Sleeve; Eom Young-shik, Kim Da-hee (Animation) – Yumi's Cells; Chae Kyung-sun (Art direction) – Squid Game

==== Television programs with multiple nominations ====
The following television programs received multiple nominations:

Nominations	Television programs
8	Squid Game
7	The Red Sleeve
5	D.P.
4	Juvenile Justice
4	Mine
4	Political Fever
3	All of Us Are Dead
3	Twenty-Five Twenty-One

==== Television programs with multiple awards ====
The following television programs received multiple awards:

Wins	Television programs
3	D.P.
3	Squid Game

=== Theatre ===
**Baeksang Play**	**Best Short Play**
**Jakdang Mock – Turkish March**; Extreme Hatangse – Theater Company; Roadkill in the Theater – National Theater Company; Fall II – Project Group Bar-Dabab; Hongpyeong Gukjeon – Theatre 907	**Kim Mi-ran (director) – This May Be a Failed Story**; Over the Crowd: Solving the Story – Pansoria Jit Nollae Box; Lee Oh-jin (director and writer) – Call Time; Lee Hong-do (producer) – Lee Hong-do's Autobiography (My Playwright Life); Han Hyeon-joo (producer) – House: House Sonata
**Best Actor**	**Best Actress**
**Park Wan-gyu – Red Leaves**; Kwon Jeong-hoon – The Sun; Kim Dong-hyun – A Man Typing a Typewriter; Yoon Sang-hwa – The Good Monster; Jung Kyung-ho – Angels in America	**Hwang Sun-mi – Hongpyeong Gukjeon**; Kang Ji-eun – Leader; Park Eun-kyung – The Time of Leaven; Park Ji-young – This May Be a Failed Story; Shin Yoon-ji – Hee-in Crazy for Youth Club

=== Special awards ===
The voting for the TikTok Popularity Award was held from 11:00 a.m. KST on 22 April to 6:00 p.m. KST on 29 April via TikTok.

Awards	Recipient
**TikTok Popularity Award (Male)**	Lee Jun-ho
**TikTok Popularity Award (Female)**	Kim Tae-ri

== Presenters and performers ==
The following individuals and teams, listed in order of appearance, presented awards or performed musical numbers.

=== Presenters ===
Presenter(s)	Award(s)	Ref.
Lee Do-hyun and Park Ju-hyun	Best New Actor – Television and Best New Actress – Television	
Hong Kyung and Choi Jung-woon	Best New Actor – Film, Best New Actress – Film and Best New Director – Film	
Park So-dam	Best Short Play	
Choi Min-ho and Chae Soo-bin	TikTok Popularity Awards for Most Popular Actor and Most Popular Actress	
Go Soo	Technical Award – Television and Technical Award – Film	
Kang Ha-neul and Lee Yoo-young	Best Screenplay – Television and Best Screenplay – Film	
Park Jeong-min and Kim Sun-young	Best Supporting Actor – Film and Best Supporting Actress – Film	
Oh Jeong-se and Yeom Hye-ran	Best Supporting Actor – Television and Best Supporting Actress – Television	
Cha Eun-woo and Lee Da-hee	Best Entertainment Program and Best Educational Show	
Kim Woo-bin and Lee Kwang-soo	Best Director – Television and Best Director – Film	
Lee Seung-gi and Jang Do-yeon	Best Male Variety Performer and Best Female Variety Performer	
Choi Soon-jin and Lee Bong-ryun	Best Actor – Theatre and Best Actress – Theatre	
Yoo Ah-in and Jeon Jong-seo	Best Actor – Film and Best Actress – Film	
Shin Ha-kyun and Kim So-yeon	Best Actor – Television and Best Actress – Television	
Moon So-ri	Baeksang Play Award	
Yum Jung-ah	Best Drama and Best Film	
Lee Joon-ik	Grand Prize – Film	
Hong Jeong-do (Vice Chairman of JoongAng Ilbo JTBC) and Yoo Jae-suk	Grand Prize – Television	

=== Performers ===
Name(s)	Role	Performed	Ref.
Hot Singers team	Performers	"This Is Me"	
