= 35th Buil Film Awards =

2026 edition of award ceremony

- Official poster
- Awarded for: Excellence in cinematic achievements
- Awarded by: Busan Ilbo
- Presented by: Hwaseung Group
- Announced on: Nominations: August 20, 2026
- Presented on: October 7, 2026
- Site: Signiel Busan Grand Ballroom in Haeundae District, Busan
- Hosted by: Kim Nam-gil; Chun Woo-hee
- Official website: 2026 Buil Film Awards

Highlights
- Best Film: The World of Love
- Best Director: Na Hong-jin; Hope
- Best Actor: Yoo Hae-jin; The King's Warden
- Best Actress: Seo Su-bin; The World of Love
- Most awards: Hope – 5
- Most nominations: No Other Choice – 9

Television coverage
- Network: Naver CHZZK; YouTube

The 36th Buil Film Awards (Korean: 제35회 부일영화상) ceremony hosted by the Busan-based daily newspaper Busan Ilbo, was held on October 7, 2026, at the Signiel Busan Grand Ballroom in Haeundae District, Busan. The award ceremony reached a wider audience this year through live streaming on Naver CHZZK, and broadcast included the red carpet, backstage interviews and the live open talk with award winners.

The awards were announced in a ceremony hosted by South Korean actor Kim Nam-gil and actress Chun Woo-hee consecutively for second year. The World of Love was awarded Best Film whereas Na Hong-jin received Best Director award for Hope.

== Awards and nominations ==
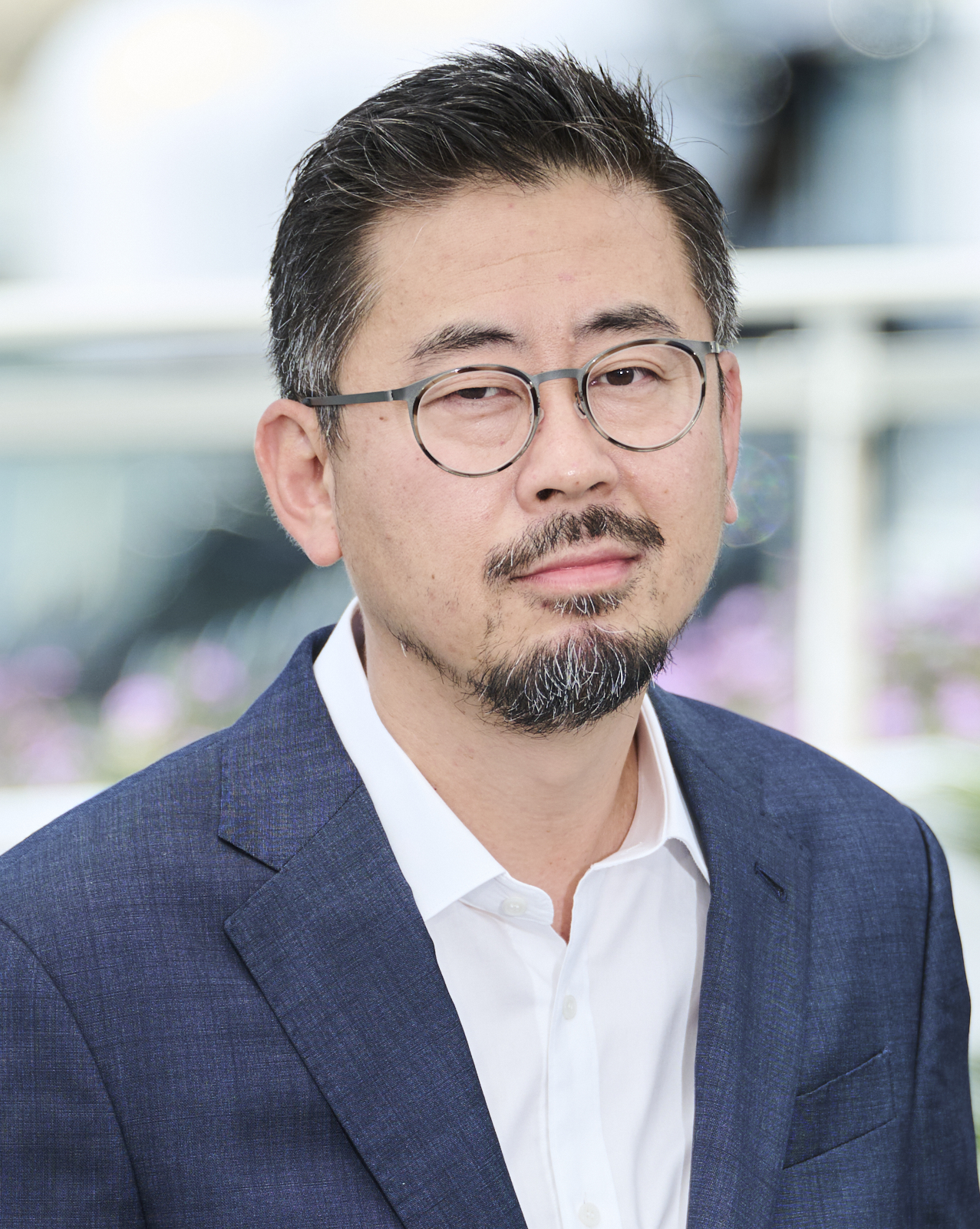
Na Hong-jin winner of Best Director Award

The nominations were announced on August 20, 2026.

Winners were announced on October 7, 2026 in a ceremony hosted by Kim Nam-gil and Chun Woo-hee.

Winners are denoted in bold

**Best Film**	**Best Director**
**The World of Love**; The Final Semester; People and Meat; No Other Choice; Hope	**Na Hong-jin – Hope**; Park Chan-wook – No Other Choice; Byun Sung-hyun – Good News; Yoon Ga-eun – The World of Love; Jang Hang-jun – The King's Warden
**Best Actor**	**Best Actress**
**Yoo Hae-jin – The King's Warden**; Koo Kyo-hwan – Once We Were Us; Park Ji-hoon – The King's Warden; Lee Byung-hun – No Other Choice; Zo In-sung – Hope	**Seo Su-bin – The World of Love**; Go Ah-sung — Pavane; Moon Ga-young – Once We Were Us; Son Ye-jin – No Other Choice; Yeom Hye-ran – My Name
**Best Supporting Actor**	**Best Supporting Actress**
**Eum Moon-suk – Hope**; Oh Jung-se – Wild Sing; Yoo Ji-tae – The King's Warden; Yoon Kyung-ho – My Daughter Is a Zombie; Lee Sung-min – No Other Choice	**Yeom Hye-ran – No Other Choice**; Shin Hyun-been – The Ugly; Lee Jung-eun – My Daughter Is a Zombie; Jang Hye-jin — The World of Love; Jeon Mi-do – The King's Warden
**Best New Actor**	**Best New Actress**
**Cho Yoo-hyun – 3670**; Moon Sang-min — Pavane; Park Ji-hoon – The King's Warden; Yoo Yi-ha – Final Semester; Joo Min-hyung – Funky Freaky Freaks	**Jung Ho Yeon – Hope**; Seo Su-bin – The World of Love; Shin Si-ah – Even If This Love Disappears From the World Tonight; Lee Seung-yeon – The Gorals; Jang Da-ah – Salmokji: Whispering Water
**Best New Director**	**Best Screenplay**
**Kim Eumin – Isle of Snakes**; Yoo Jae-wook – The Gorals; Lee Sang-min – Salmokji: Whispering Water; Choi Seung-woo – Last Summer; Han Chang-rok – Funky Freaky Freaks	**Byun Sung-hyun, Lee Jin-sung – Good News**; Yeon Sang-ho – The Ugly; Yoon Ga-eun – The World of Love; Lee Ran-hee – The Final Semester; Lim Na-moo – People and Meat
**Best Cinematography**	**Art/Technical Award**
**Hong Kyung-pyo – Hope**; Kim Woo-hyung – No Other Choice; Byun Bong-sun – Colony; Yang Hyun-suk – Humint; Cho Hyung-rae – Good News	**Lee Hoo-kyung (Art) – Hope**; Yoo Sang-seop (Martial Arts) – Hope; Han Ah-reum (Art) – Good News; Ryu Seong-hee (Art) – No Other Choice; Park Il Hyun (Art) – The People Upstairs
**Best Music**	**Yu Hyun-mok Film Arts Award**
**Minhwi Lee – Pavane**; Jo Yeong-wook – No Other Choice; Lee Jin-hee – Wild Sing; Dalpalan – The King's Warden	Late film critic Lim Jae-cheol
**Star of the Year Award (Male)**	**Star of the Year Award (Female)**
**Park Ji-hoon**	**Jeon Mi-do**

== Films with multiple nominations ==
The following films received multiple nominations:

Nominations	Films	Categories
9	No Other Choice	Best Film, Best Director, Best Actor, Best Actress, Best Supporting Actor, Best Supporting Actress, Best Cinematography, Art/Technical Award, Best Music
8	Hope	Best Film, Best Director, Best Actor, Best Supporting Actor, Best Cinematography, Best New Actress, Art/Technical Award, Best Music
6	The World of Love	Best Film, Best Director, Best Actress, Best Supporting Actress, Best Screenplay, Best New Actress
6	The King's Warden	Best Director, Best Actor, Best Supporting Actor, Best Supporting Actress, Best New Actor, Best Music

== See also ==
- 62nd Baeksang Arts Awards
- 47th Blue Dragon Film Awards
