= 47th Blue Dragon Film Awards =

2026 edition of South Korean film awards

- Official poster
- Awarded for: Excellence in cinematic achievements
- Awarded by: Sports Chosun
- Announced on: October 12, 2026
- Presented on: November 25, 2026
- Site: KBS Hall, Yeouido, Seoul
- Organized by: Sports Chosun (a sister brand of The Chosun Ilbo)
- Official website: blueaward.co.kr

Highlights
- Most nominations: 10 – Hope

Television coverage
- Network: KBS; YouTube; Naver NOW

The 47th Blue Dragon Film Awards (Korean: 제47회 청룡영화상) is an annual South Korean film award ceremony organized by Sports Chosun. It will be held on November 25, 2026, at KBS Hall in Yeouido, Seoul, and broadcast live on KBS2 and online platforms. This year, the event will highlight the significance of Korean cinema by featuring the films, actors, and filmmakers that received support and appreciation from audiences during the year.

Nominations were announced on October 28, 2026. Hope received 10 nominations including best film and best director followed by Possible Love, which received 8 nominations.

== Chungjungwon Short Film Awards ==
This year, the Blue Dragon Film Awards is holding the Chungjungwon Short Film Awards, a short film competition open to South Korean citizens and international students in South Korea, to support emerging trends in Korean cinema. Winners are selected by a panel of film experts and announced at the awards ceremony of November 25.

== Nominees and winners ==
The nominees for the awards were announced in 15 categories on October 28, 2026.

Best Film	Best Director
Colony; The World of Love; The Assassin(s); The King's Warden; Hope	Na Hong-jin – Hope; Yeon Sang-ho – Colony; Yoon Ga-eun – The World of Love; Jang Hang-jun – The King's Warden; Hur Jin-ho – The Assassin(s)
Best Actor	Best Actress
Koo Kyo-hwan – Once We Were Us; Park Hae-il – The Assassin(s); Sul Kyung-gu – Possible Love; Yoo Hae-jin – The King's Warden; Zo In-sung – Hope	Go Ah-sung – Pavane; Moon Ga-young – Once We Were Us; Shin Min-ah – The Eyes; Lee Jung-eun – The Journey to Gyeongju; Jeon Do-yeon – Possible Love
Best Supporting Actor	Best Supporting Actress
Koo Kyo-hwan – Colony; Oh Jung-se – Wild Sing; Eum Moon-suk – Hope; Lee Min-ho – The Assassin(s); Zo In-sung – Possible Love	Kim Shin-rok – Colony; Park Ji-hyun – Wild Sing; Jang Hye-jin – The World of Love; Jeon Mi-do – The King's Warden; Cho Yeo-jeong – Possible Love
Best New Actor	Best New Actress
Moon Sang-min – Pavane; Moon Ji-hoon – Tazza: The Song of Beelzebub; Park Ji-hoon – The King's Warden; Lee Jong-won – Salmokji: Whispering Water; Joo Min-hyeong – Funky Freaky Freaks	Kim Si-a – Summer's Camera; Seo Su-bin – The World of Love; Lee Yeon – The Journey to Gyeongju; Jang Da-ah – Salmokji: Whispering Water; Jung Ho-yeon – Hope
Best New Director	Best Screenplay
Kwon Yong-jae – Godangdo; Kim Mi-jo – The Journey to Gyeongju; Divine Sung – Summer's Camera; Lee Sang-min – Salmokji: Whispering Water; Han Chang-rok – Funky Freaky Freaks	Lee Chang-dong, Oh Jung-mi – Possible Love; Kim Mi-jo – The Journey to Gyeongju; Byun Sung-hyun, Lee Jin-sung – Good News; Yoon Ga-eun – The World of Love; Jang Hang-jun, Hwang Seong-gu – The King's Warden
Best Editing	Best Cinematography and Lighting
Kim Da-won – Possible Love; Kim Sang-bum – Good News; Lee Gang-hee – Once We Were Us; Kim Sun-min – Hope; Bae Yeon-tae – Humint	Kim Ji-yong – Possible Love; Byun Bong-sun – Colony; Cho Hyung-rae – Good News; Hong Kyung-pyo – Hope; Yang Hyun-suk – Humint
Best Art Direction	Best Music
Han Ah-reum – Good News; Kim Byung-han – The Assassin(s); Bae Jung-yoon – The King's Warden; Kim Bo-mi – Pavane; Lee Hoo-kyoung – Hope	Jung Jae-il – Possible Love; Kim Jang-woo – Once We Were Us; Lee Jin-hee – Wild Sing; Minhwi Lee – Pavane; Michael Abels – Hope
Technical Award	Chung Jung-won Best Short Film
Hwang Hyo-gyun (SFX Makeup) – Colony; Kim Young-ho (Sound) – Salmokji: Whispering Water; Kim Jung-won (Costume) – Wild Sing; Hong Jang-pyo (SFX) – Hope; Lee Won-haeng (Stunt) – Humint	

== See also ==
- 62nd Baeksang Arts Awards
- 35th Buil Film Awards
