= Seo Su-bin =

South Korean actress

- Seo in 2026
- Born: Ulsan, South Korea
- Education: Pyeongtaek University – Department of Theater and Film
- Occupation: Actress
- Years active: 2025–present
- Agent: Red Line Entertainment
- Known for: The World of Love

Korean name
- Hangul: 서수빈
- RR: Seo Subin
- MR: Sŏ Subin

Seo Su-bin (Korean: 서수빈) is a South Korean actress. She is known for her breakout, debut lead role in The World of Love for which she won the Best Actress Award at the 2025 Red Sea International Film Festival.

== Early life ==
Seo was born in Ulsan, South Korea. She danced as a child and even briefly underwent K-pop idol training.

Seo studied at Pyeongtaek University under the Department of Theater and Film, focusing on practical skills and artistic sensibility by actively participating in various performances, video productions, and field-oriented projects during her studies.

== Career ==
Prior to The World of Love, Seo never acted. A fan of director Yoon Ga-eun, she was cast "after three meetings and an acting workshop", much of which felt like a "blind date". Yoon was charmed by her eyes, her honesty in-person, and her immediate synergy with other actors, on top of her taekwondo experience, which was crucial to Yoon's script.

On the festival circuit, Seo drew acclaim from Korean and international critics alike for her performance. At the Red Sea International Film Festival, she won the Best Actress Award by a unanimous decision from the jury.

== Filmography ==
=== Film ===
Year	Title	Role	Ref.
2025	The World of Love	Lee Ju-in	

=== Television series ===
Year	Title	Role	Ref.
2026	KBS Drama Special: "Sound:Track"	Lee Hang-yul	

=== Hosting ===
Year	Title	Notes	Ref.
2026	Busan International Children and Youth Film Festival	Opening ceremony	

=== Events ===
Year	Event	Role	Notes	Ref.
2026	Bechdel Day 2026	Speaker	with Yoon Ga-eun and Lee Min-hwi for The World of Love	
2026	4.16 Life Safety Biennale	Speaker	Life Safety Cinema for The World of Love	

== Accolades ==
=== Awards and nominations ===
Name of the award ceremony, year presented, category, nominee of the award, and the result of the nomination
Award ceremony	Year	Category	Nominee / Work	Result	Ref.
Baeksang Arts Awards	2026	Best New Actress – Film	The World of Love	Won	
Blue Dragon Film Awards	2026	Best New Actress	The World of Love	Pending	
Buil Film Awards	2026	Best Actress	The World of Love	Won	
Buil Film Awards	2026	Best New Actress	The World of Love	Nominated	
Buyeo International History Film Festival	2026	Baekje Signature Star Award	Seo Su-bin	Won	
Chunsa Film Art Awards	2025	Best New Actress	The World of Love	Won	
Director's Cut Awards	2026	Best Actress – Film	The World of Love	Won	
Korean Art Film Association Awards	2026	Best Actor	The World of Love	Won	
Korean Association of Film Critics Awards	2026	Best New Actress	The World of Love	Won	
Korean Film Producers Association Awards	2025	Best New Actress	The World of Love	Won	
Red Sea International Film Festival	2025	Best Actress Award	The World of Love	Won	
Women's Film Festival	2025	Best New Actress Award	The World of Love	Won	

=== Listicles ===
Key
‡	Indicates a sole placement listicle

Name of publisher, year listed, name of listicle and placement
Publisher	Year	Listicle	Placement	Ref.
Cine21	2026	‡ Rookie Actress of the Year	Placed	
