= Bechdel Day 2026 =

Bechdel Day
- Native name: 벡델데이 2026
- Sponsored by: Ministry of Culture, Sports and Tourism; Korean Film Council
- Date: August 29–30, 2026
- Venue: Yeonnamjang, Seoul
- Country: South Korea
- Currently held by: Directors Guild of Korea (DGK)

Bechdel Day 2026 (Korean: 벡델데이 2026) was held on Yeonnamjang, Seoul, on August 29–30, 2026. It marked the seventh edition of Bechdel Day, an annual South Korean awards ceremony and event hosted by the Directors Guild of Korea (DGK) and by the Ministry of Culture, Sports and Tourism and the Korean Film Council. Established in 2020, the event evaluates and honors gender equality in South Korean film and television, utilizing the Bechdel test alongside expanded criteria.

== Program ==
=== Special screening ===
Bechdel Day 2026 will feature a special screening and Q&A of Director Cho Hyun-jin’s Mad Dance Office on August 24 at 7 p.m. at Megabox Sinchon Hall 4. Mad Dance Office, a "Bechdel Choice 10" selection, uses comedy and flamenco to depict the struggles, labor, and workplace frustrations of middle-aged women. The film is noted for emphasizing solidarity over individual success as a means of survival. This event is a collaboration between the Seoul International Women's Film Festival and the Directors Guild of Korea. The post-screening Q&A will be moderated by Director Min Kyu-dong, featuring Director Cho Hyun-jin and actress Yeom Hye-ran. The event aims to foster a broader dialogue regarding the evolution of female narratives and the state of gender equality in film.

== Winners ==
=== Judging ===
On August 5, 2026, the Directors Guild of Korea announced the Bechdel Choice 10 film selections, following a review of 128 films released between June of the previous year and May 2026. The judging panel consisted of director Lee Mi-rang, film critic Son Hee-jung, Annapurna Film CEO Lee Anna, and Cine21 reporter Kim So-mi.

On August 12, the Directors Guild of Korea announced the Bechdel Choice 10 series selections. The series category of 'Bechdel Day 2026' reviewed 102 dramas released across terrestrial, general programming, cable, OTT, and web platforms from June of last year to May of this year. The judging and evaluation panel for the series category included Movement representative Jin Myung-hyun, Chung-Ang University creative writing professor Kim Min-jeong, and writer Choi Ji-eun.

=== Bechdel Choice 10 ===
Yoon Ga-eun, Bechdellian of the Year (Film Director)

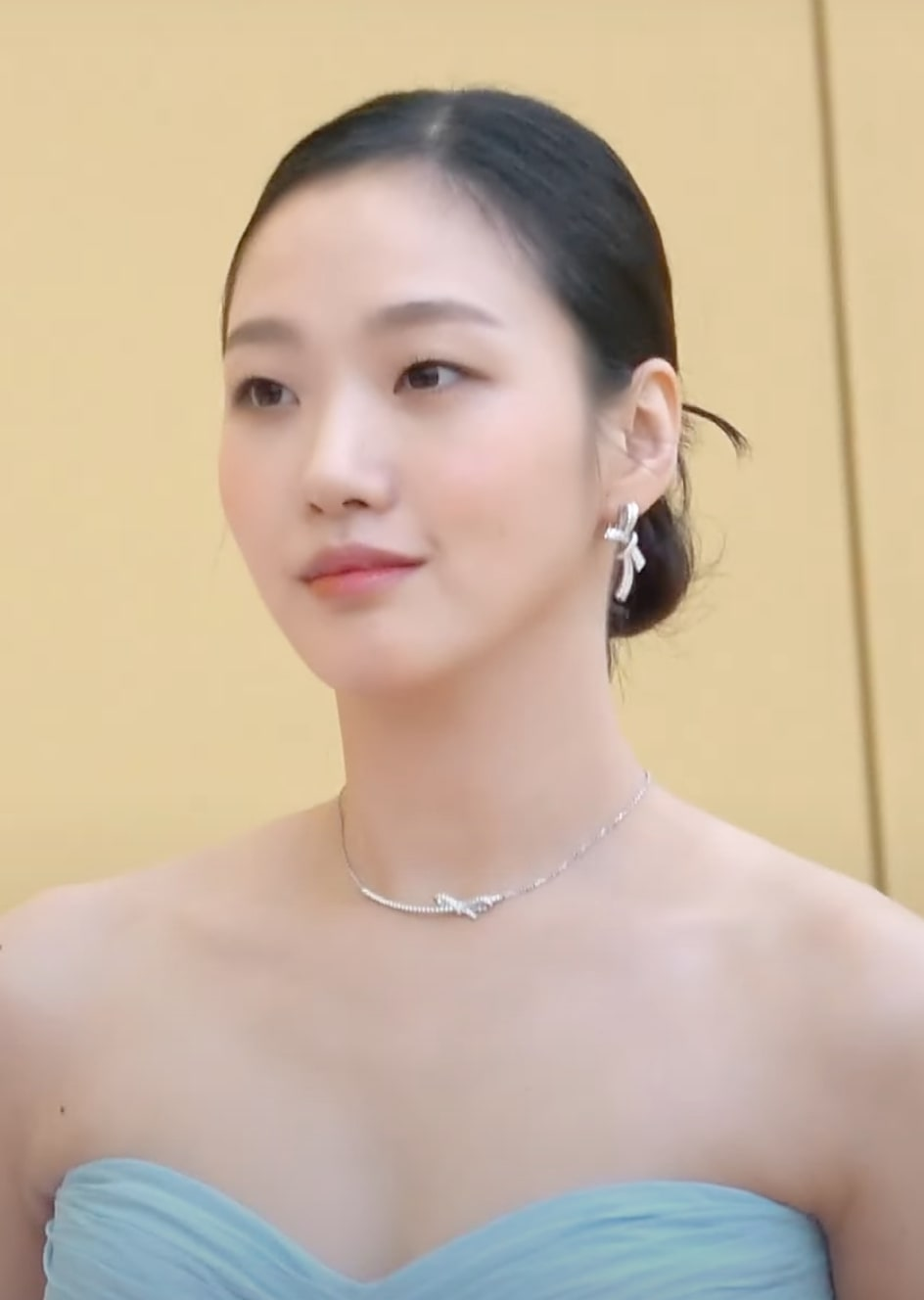
Kim Go-eun, Bechdellian of the Year (Series Actress)

Bechdel Choice 10 of the Year
| Film | Series |
| Teaching Practice: Idiot Girls and School Ghost 2; Merely Known as Something Else; Home Behind Bars; Once We Were Us; Mad Dance Office; The World of Love; Between the two of us; The Woman in the White Car; Hallan; Red Nails | Don't Call Me Ma'am; As You Stood By; The Art of Sarah; We Are All Trying Here; Honour; The Price of Confession; You and Everything Else; Yumi's Cells; Undercover Miss Hong; Aema |

=== Bechdelian ===
Bechdellian of the Year
| Director — Film | Director — Series |
| Yoon Ga-eun – The World of Love | Lee Hae-young – Aema |
| Producer — Film | Producer — Series |
| Ha Myung-mi – Hallan | Choi Han-gyul; Park Jin-hyung; Son Jae-sung – Honour |
| Screenwriter — Film | Screenwriter — Series |
| Seo Ja-yeon – The Woman in the White Car | Song Hye-jin – You and Everything Else |
| Actress — Film | Actress — Series |
| Jang Sun; Byun Jung-hee – Red Nails | Kim Go-eun – The Price of Confession, You and Everything Else, Yumi's Cells Season 3 |
