= 29th Chunsa Film Art Awards =

29th edition of award ceremony

2025 Chunsa International Film Festival
- Official poster
- Awarded for: Excellence in cinematic achievements
- Awarded by: Korean Film Directors Association
- Announced on: December 15, 2025
- Presented on: December 23, 2025
- Site: CG Art Hall, Construction Association Building in Gangnam-gu, Seoul, South Korea
- Hosted by: Park Han-byul; Kim Yong-myung

Highlights
- Best Direction: Yoon Ga-eun; The World of Love
- Best Actor: Lee Byung-hun; No Other Choice
- Best Actress: Lim Yoona; Pretty Crazy
- Best Supporting Actor: Kwon Hae-hyo; The Ugly
- Best Supporting Actress: Lee Jung-eun; My Daughter Is a Zombie

The 29th Chunsa Film Art Awards (Korean: 제29회춘사국제영화제), also known as The 29th Chunsa International Film Festival (제29회 춘사국제영화제가), have been hosted by the Korean Film Directors Association and organized by Chan Entertainment and Yemaek Innovation. It is sponsored by the Ministry of Culture, Sports and Tourism, the Korean Film Council, the Korean Film Archive, the Korea Cinema Association, and the Federation of Korean Filmmakers.

The 29th Chunsa International Film Festival was held on December 23 at CG Art Hall, Construction Association Building in Gangnam-gu, Seoul. The ceremony was hosted by Park Han-byul and Kim Yong-myung. The live broadcast of the award ceremony scheduled to take place on CHZZK, was unavoidably cancelled due to circumstances on the organizer's side. At the award ceremony, Yoon Ga-eun won the Best Director award for independent film The World of Love, meanwhile Lee Byung-hun won Best Actor award for No Other Choice and Lim Yoona won Best Actress award for Pretty Crazy.

== Winners and nominees ==
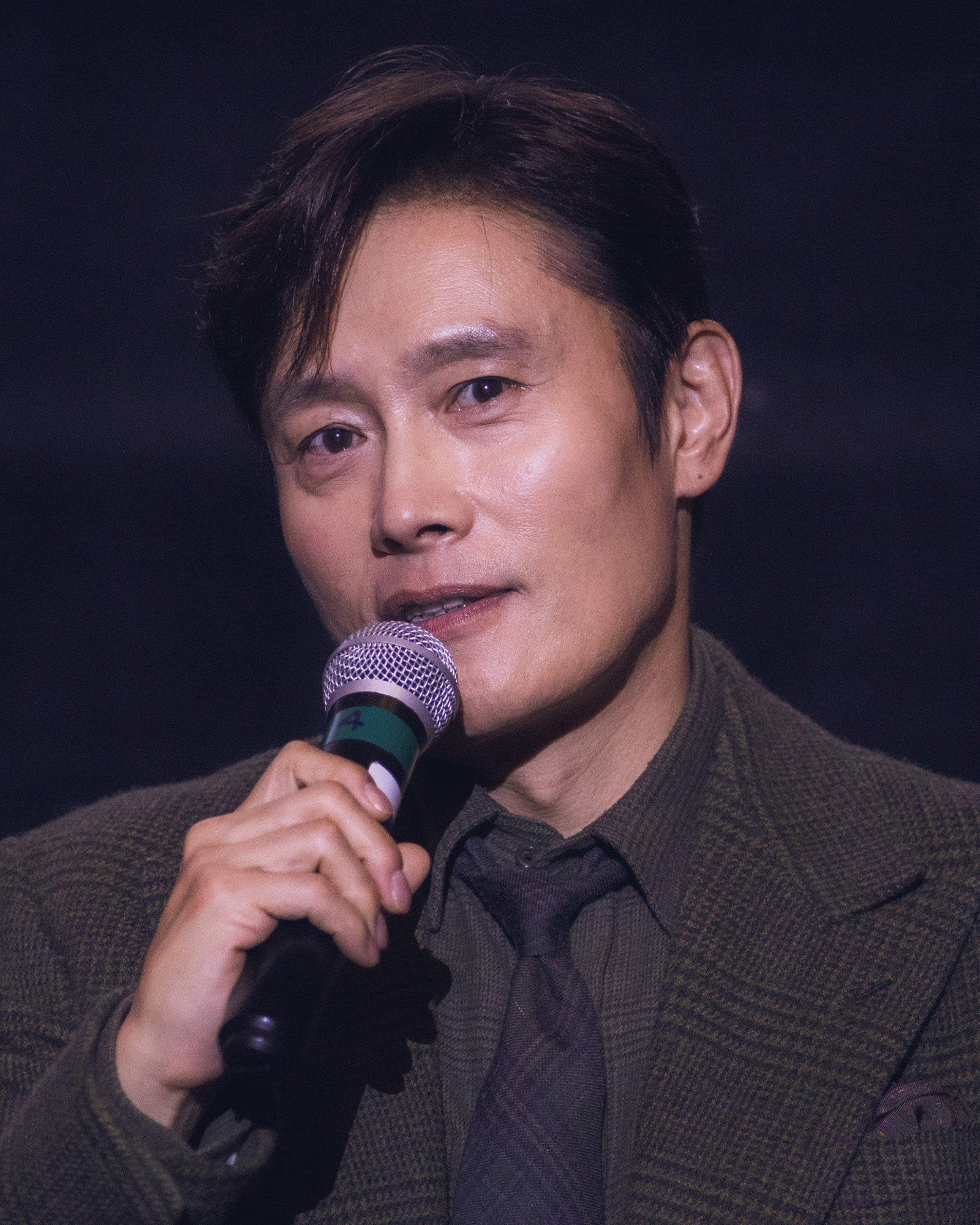
Lee Byung-hun, winner of Best Actor Award

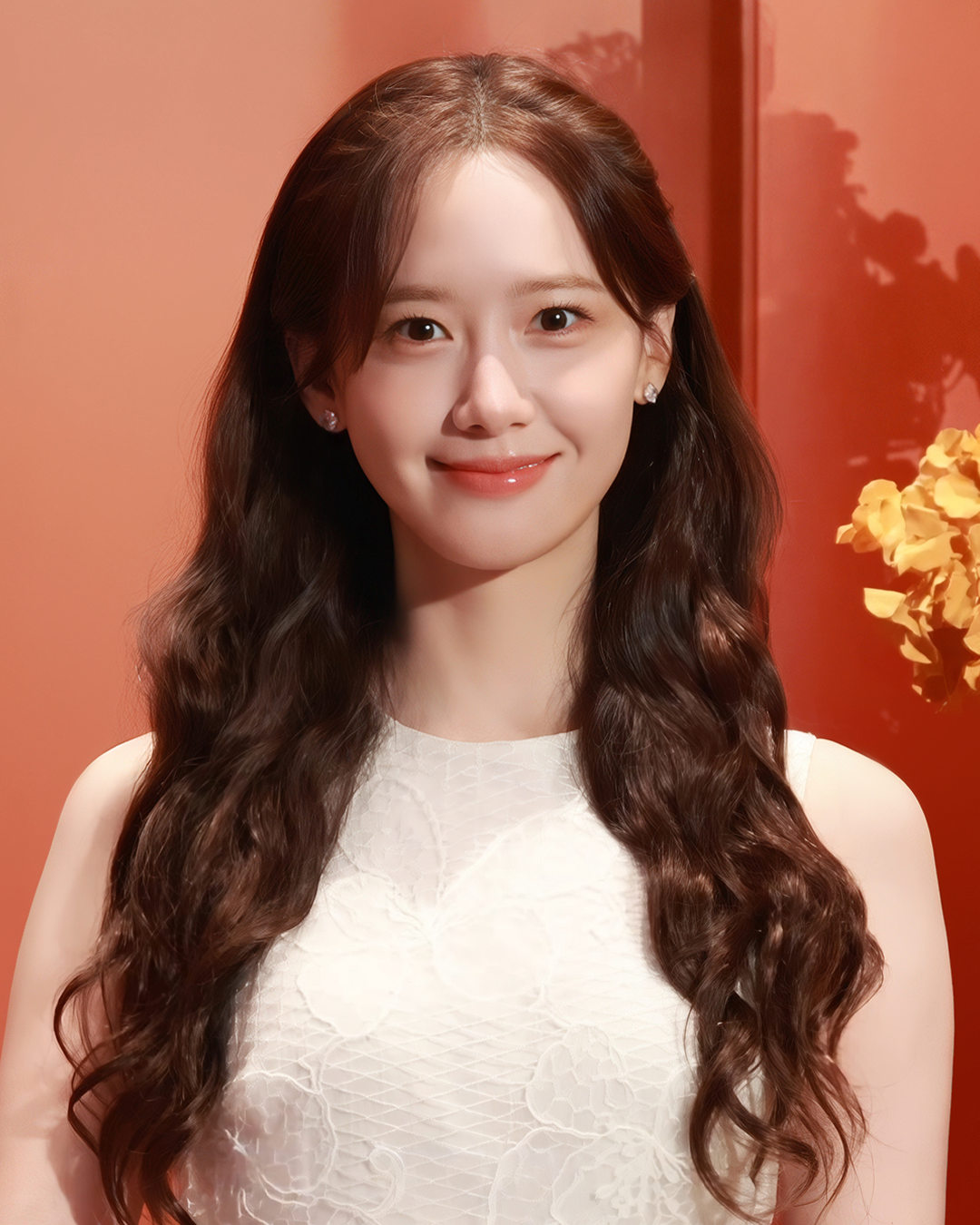
Lim Yoona, winner of Best Actress Award

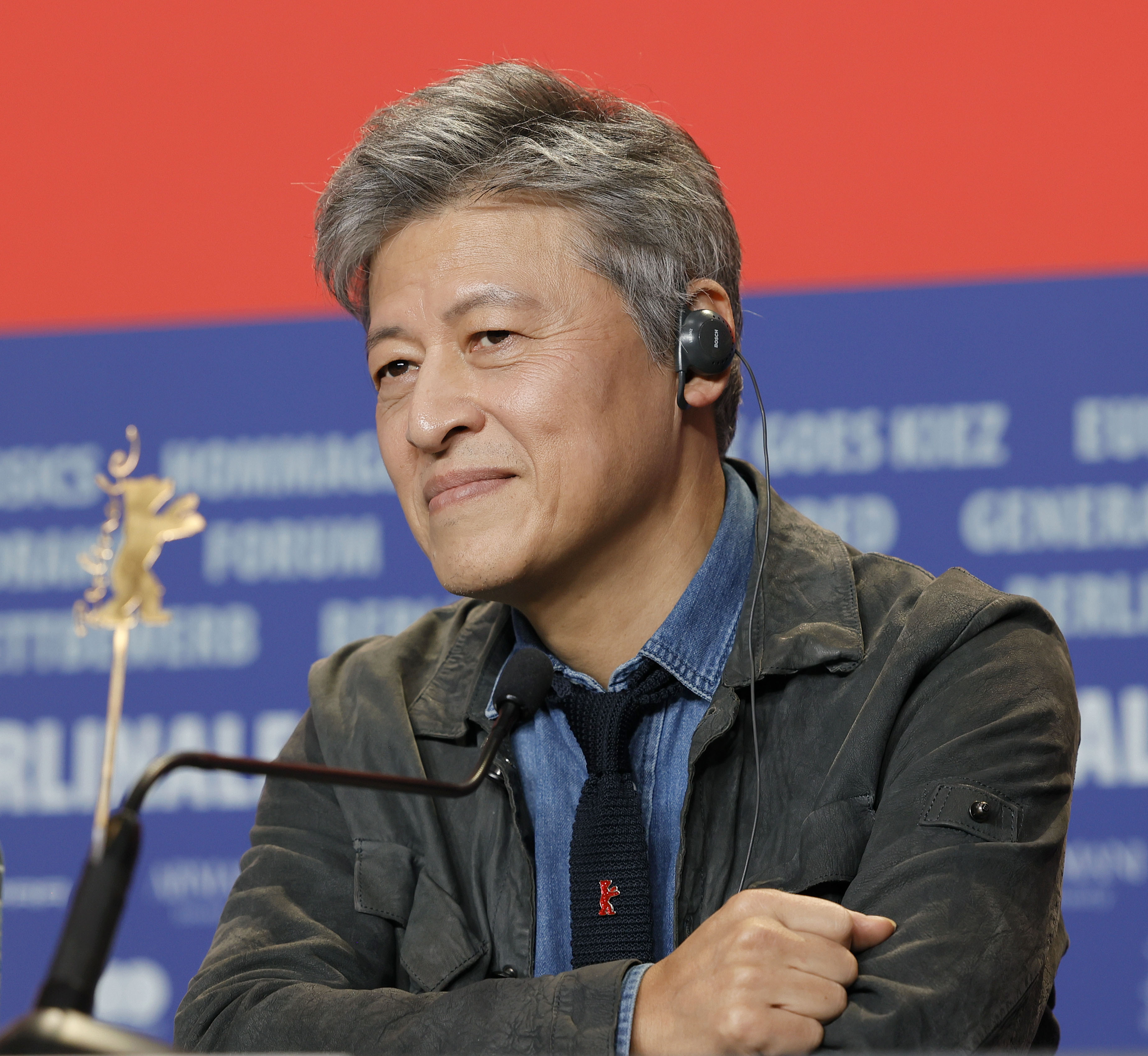
Kwon Hae-hyo, winner of Best Supporting Actor Award

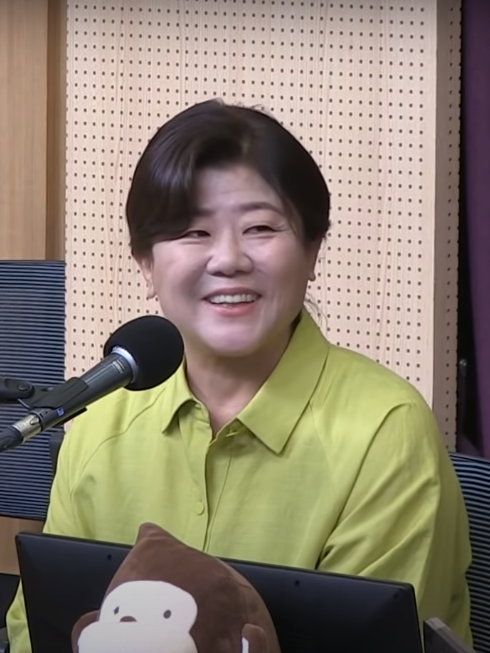
Lee Jung-eun, winner of Best Supporting Actress Award

The winners were announced on December 23, at the ceremony that was held at the CG Art Hall, Construction Association Building in Gangnam-gu, Seoul.

Best Director	Best New Director
Yoon Ga-eun – The World of Love	Jang Byung-ki – When This Summer is Over
Best Actor	Best Actress
Lee Byung-hun – No Other Choice	Lim Yoona – Pretty Crazy
Best Supporting Actor	Best Supporting Actress
Kwon Hae-hyo – The Ugly	Lee Jung-eun – My Daughter Is a Zombie
Best New Actor	Best New Actress
Jung Sung-il – Uprising	Seo Su-bin – The World of Love
Best Screenplay	Best Cinematography
Lee Ran-hee – The Final Semester	Kim Woo-hyung – No Other Choice
Film Directors' Choices for Best Actor	Best Documentary
Sul Kyung-gu – Good News	Yang Hee – Words from the Wind
Special Jury Prize	New Star Award
Lee Sung-min – No Other Choice	Dahyun – You Are the Apple of My Eye
Award for Excellence Director in Aesthetic Filmmaking
Yang Yun-ho
OTT Award
Directing Award in OTT Film/Series	Acting Award in OTT Film/Series
Byun Sung-hyun – Good News	Kim Go-eun – The Price of Confession

== See also ==
- 61st Baeksang Arts Awards
- 34th Buil Film Awards
- 46th Blue Dragon Film Awards
