= Jang Hye-jin =

South Korean actress (born 1975)

- Jang in 2025
- Born: September 5, 1975 (age 51); Busan, South Korea
- Occupation: Actress
- Years active: 1998, 2007–present
- Agent: IOK Company
- Children: 2

Korean name
- Hangul: 장혜진
- RR: Jang Hyejin
- MR: Chang Hyejin

Jang Hye-jin (Korean: 장혜진; born September 5, 1975) is a South Korean actress. She is best known internationally for her role as Kim Chung-sook in the Academy Award winning film Parasite.

== Career ==
Hye-jin was born in Busan on September 5, 1975. Her acting career began in the 1990s, with a minor role in the 1998 feature film If It Snows On Christmas. She began to gain media attention in her native country in the mid-2000s when she played the role of Park Myung-suk in the dramatic film Secret Sunshine under the direction of filmmaker and novelist Lee Chang-dong and with her appearance in SBS's My Sweet Seoul TV series.

At the end of the decade she appeared in the films Marine Boy by Yoon Jong-seok and Poetry by the aforementioned Lee Chang-dong. In 2016 she was cast in Yoon Ga-eun's The World of Us and Shin Joon's Yongsoon, before playing Jung-hee in Lee Dong-eun's feature film Mothers with Im Soo-jung, Yoon Chan-young and Lee Sang-hee.

After playing supporting roles in the films Adulthood and Youngju and in the TV series Hold me Tight, the actress gained international recognition by playing the lead role of Kim Chung-sook in Bong Joon-ho's award-winning film Parasite, which won four Academy Awards in 2020 in the categories of Best Film, Best Director, Best Original Screenplay, and Best International Film. In the movie she plays a mother who irregularly gets the job as a housekeeper for a wealthy family.

After her participation in Parasite, the actress was featured in the 2020 TV series A Piece of Your Mind, How to Buy a Friend, True Beauty and Birthcare Center, in addition to playing the role of Seon-myeong in the comic feature film More Than Family alongside Krystal Jung and Choi Deok-moon.

In 2021, she played the role of Court Lady Seo in MBC historical drama The Red Sleeve. And in 2022 she stars in JTBC television series Green Mothers' Club

== Filmography ==
=== Film ===
Year	Title	Role
1998	If It Snows On Christmas	Secretary
2007	Secret Sunshine	Park Myung-suk
2009	Marine Boy	Immigration judge
2010	Poetry	Mr. Kang's second daughter-in-law
2012	Saying I Love You	Su-ji
2016	The World of Us	Mom
2016	Yongsoon	Middle aged woman at meat restaurant
2017	Mothers	Jung-hee
2018	Adulthood	Jum-hee's second sister-in-law
2018	Youngju	Aunt
2019	Parasite	Chung-Sook (Mrs. Kim)
2019	The House of Us	Seon's mom
2019	Family Affair	Mi Jung
2020	More Than Family	Seon-myeong
2023	Soulmate	Ha-eun's mother
2025	The World of Love	Kang Tae-sun
2026	Number One	Eun-sil

=== Television series ===
Year	Title	Role	Notes/Ref.
2008	My Sweet Seoul		
2018	Hold Me Tight	Baek So-jin	
2019	When the Camellia Blooms	Park Young-sim	
2019–2020	Crash Landing on You	Go Myeong-eun	
2020	A Piece of Your Mind	Han Seo-woo's mother	Cameo
2020	How to Buy a Friend	Jo Pyung-seop	
2020	Memorials	Kim Sam-suk	
2020	Birthcare Center	Choi Hye-suk	
2020–2021	True Beauty	Hong Hyun-sook	
2021	Hospital Playlist 2	Chu Min-ha's mother	Cameo (episode 10)
2021	Reflection of You	Ahn Min-seo	
2021	The Red Sleeve	Court Lady Seo	
2022	Green Mothers' Club	Kim Young-mi	
2022	The Law Cafe	Kim Cheon-daek	
2022	Curtain Call	Oh Ga-young	Cameo (episode 1, 7)
2023	Longing for You	Hong Young-hee	
2023	The Matchmakers	Lady Song	
2024	Doctor Slump	Kong Wol-seon	
2024	Jeongnyeon: The Star Is Born	Han Ki-Joo	
2025	The Witch	Lee Dong-jin's mother	
2025	When Life Gives You Tangerines	Yeong-ran	

== Accolades ==
=== Awards and nominations ===
Name of the award ceremony, year presented, category, nominee of the award, and the result of the nomination
Award ceremony	Year	Category	Nominee / Work	Result	Ref.
Baeksang Arts Awards	2022	Best Supporting Actress – Television	The Red Sleeve	Nominated	
Baeksang Arts Awards	2026	Best Supporting Actress – Film	The World of Love	Nominated	
Blue Dragon Film Awards	2026	Best Supporting Actress	The World of Love	Pending	
Buil Film Awards	2019	Best Supporting Actress	Parasite	Nominated	
Critics' Choice Awards	2020	Best Acting Ensemble	Parasite	Nominated	
Gold Derby Awards	2020	Best Ensemble	Parasite	Won	
Golden Cinematography Awards	2021	Best Supporting Actress	More Than Family	Won	
MBC Drama Awards	2021	Best Supporting Actress	The Red Sleeve	Won	
Screen Actors Guild Awards	2020	Outstanding Performance by a Cast in a Motion Picture	Parasite	Won	

=== Listicles ===
Name of publisher, year listed, name of listicle, and placement
Publisher	Year	Listicle	Placement	Ref.
Korean Film Council	2021	Korean Actors 200 (Note: Introduces 200 actors that best represent the present and future of Korean cinema to the people in the film industry all over the world.)	Included	
