= Wild Sing =

2026 film by Son Jae-gon

- Theatrical release poster
- Hangul: 와일드 씽
- RR: Waildeu ssing
- MR: Waildŭ ssing
- Directed by: Son Jae-gon
- Written by: Kim Chae-woo
- Produced by: Kim Seong-hwan; Park Eun
- Starring: Gang Dong-won; Um Tae-goo; Park Ji-hyun; Oh Jung-se
- Cinematography: Shin Tae-ho
- Edited by: Shin Min-kyung
- Music by: Lee Jin-hee
- Production company: About Film
- Distributed by: Lotte Entertainment
- Release date: June 3, 2026
- Running time: 107 minutes
- Country: South Korea
- Language: Korean
- Box office: US$9 million

Wild Sing (Korean: 와일드 씽) is a 2026 South Korean musical drama film directed by Son Jae-gon and stars Gang Dong-won, Um Tae-goo, Park Ji-hyun, and Oh Jung-se. It follows "Triangle", a once-popular co-ed dance trio that reunites after 20 years and embarks on a reckless challenge to seize a chance at a comeback. Distributed by Lotte Entertainment, the film was released in South Korea on June 3, 2026.

== Plot ==
In 2001, nineteen-year-old dancer Hwang Hyun-woo is discovered by small-time producer Park Yong-gu and recruited into a new co-ed pop group called Triangle. Alongside rapper Gu Sang-gu and vocalist Byeon Do-mi, he trains for a year before debuting with the hit song "Love Is" and quickly becoming one of the biggest acts of their generation.

At the height of their fame, however, everything collapses overnight. During a celebration party, rival singer Choi Seong-gon is unknowingly drawn into a drug scandal that destroys his career. At the same time, Triangle discovers they have never received proper payment for their work. Soon afterward, news breaks that their hit song was plagiarized, despite being publicly credited to Hyun-woo. Before the group can respond, producer Yong-gu flees the country, abandoning them and leaving them to face the backlash alone. As tensions rise, Do-mi decides to leave, and Triangle disbands in disgrace.

More than twenty years later, Hyun-woo is a forgotten celebrity surviving on minor radio and television appearances. After being dismissed from yet another program, he receives an unexpected opportunity: Triangle is invited to reunite for a major concert, and a successful performance could lead to a new television music show. Determined to seize what may be his last chance, Hyun-woo sets out to reunite the estranged members despite their unresolved conflicts.

He finds Sang-gu struggling with debt after failed solo ventures and working as an insurance salesman. Do-mi, meanwhile, lives comfortably as the wife of a wealthy businessman but feels trapped in a dull life dominated by family expectations. Though both initially resist, Hyun-woo gradually convinces them to return. At the same time, former star Choi Seong-gon, whose career was ruined by the scandal decades earlier, is also invited to perform at the concert, hoping for a comeback of his own.

As the reunion approaches, the group unexpectedly encounters Yong-gu, who has secretly returned to South Korea under a new identity after years abroad. Furious over his betrayal, their pursuit of him leads to a chaotic series of accidents, failed rehearsals, and misunderstandings, putting their concert appearance at risk. After countless setbacks, they finally reach the venue at the last moment and take the stage. Instead of recreating their old performance, they reinvent it: Sang-gu adds new rap verses inspired by his life, Do-mi showcases her vocal talent, and Hyun-woo unleashes the breakdancing skills that made him famous. The audience responds with overwhelming enthusiasm, proving that their music and bond still resonate after all these years.

Afterward, Do-mi returns to her family life but remains involved as the group's producer. Hyun-woo and Sang-gu continue to perform as a revamped version of Triangle, with Seong-gon joining as the new vocalist.

== Cast ==
- Gang Dong-won as Hwang Hyun-woo
- Um Tae-goo as Gu Sang-gu
- Park Ji-hyun as Byeon Do-mi
- Oh Jung-se as Choi Seong-gon
- Shin Ha-kyun as Park Yong-gu ("YGP")
- Kang Ki-young as Na Tae-poong
- Park Hae-mi as Do-mi's mother-in-law
- Kim Ki-cheon as Loan Shark Go
- Gong Myung as Hyun-woo's junior
- Heo Joon-seok as PD Gong
- Yang Hyun-min as Police Officer Kang
- RalRal as a music show host
- Han Kyung-rok as a rock singer

== Production ==
=== Development ===
The film depicts the South Korean K-pop industry of the late 1990s and early 2000s, drawing inspiration from first-generation idol groups. The cast underwent approximately five months of training and rehearsal to prepare for the film's musical performances.

=== Casting ===
Actress Lim Ji-yeon was reported to be in talks to join the cast of Wild Sing, but ultimately declined the role due to scheduling commitments.

== Music ==
The film's music was directed and composed by Lee Jin-hee, who served as the film's music director. The first title track, "Love Is", released on April 21, 2026. The song was performed by Triangle and composed by Sim Eun-jee, a JYP Publishing songwriter and producer who has worked on songs for artists including Twice, Itzy, and IU. The choreography for "Love Is" was designed by Yang Wook, a choreographer known for creating performances for artists such as BoA, Rain, and Lee Hyori.

Two additional title tracks, "Shout It Out", performed by Triangle, and "I Like You", performed by Choi Seong-gon, were released on May 22, 2026. The full soundtrack album was subsequently released on June 3, 2026, and was made available on digital streaming platforms as well as in a physical album format. The special physical edition was designed in the style of an idol album, featuring a retro Y2K concept.

It also featured songs credited to members of the film's cast, including Gang Dong-won, Um Tae-goo, Park Ji-hyun, and Oh Jung-se, who performed under the names of their respective characters in the film.

Wild Sing (Original Soundtrack)

Soundtrack album by Various artists
- Released: June 3, 2026
- Genre: Soundtrack
- Length: 58:20
- Language: Korean
- Labels: Genie Music; Lotte Entertainment

There are 33 tracks in the album:
| No. | Title | Lyrics | Music | Artist | Length |
|---|---|---|---|---|---|
| 1. | "Love Is" | Sim Eun-jee | Sim Eun-jee | Triangle (Note: Performed by Gang Dong-won, Um Tae-goo, and Park Jihyun) | 3:26 |
| 2. | "Love Is (Concert Version)" | Sim Eun-jee; Kass; Gu Sang-gu | Sim Eun-jee | Triangle | 3:27 |
| 3. | "Love Is (Inst.)" | | Sim Eun-jee | Triangle | 3:26 |
| 4. | "Shout It Out" | Lee Jin-hee | Lee Jin-hee | Triangle | 3:26 |
| 5. | "Shout It Out (Inst.)" | | Lee Jin-hee | Triangle | 3:26 |
| 6. | "I Like You" (니가 좋아) | Lee Jin-hee | Lee Jin-hee | Choi Seong-geon | 3:17 |
| 7. | "I Like You (Inst.)" (니가 좋아 (Inst.)) | | Lee Jin-hee | Choi Seong-geon | 3:17 |
| 8. | "I Like You (Sing-Along Version)" (니가 좋아 (싱어롱 Ver.)) | Lee Jin-hee | Lee Jin-hee | Choi Seong-geon | 3:15 |
| 9. | "Wild Dance" | | Kim Hong-jib | Kim Hong-jib | 1:31 |
| 10. | "Wild Sing" | | Lee Jin-hee | Lee Jin-hee | 1:54 |
| 11. | "Party Time" | | Lee Jin-hee | Lee Jin-hee | 1:05 |
| 12. | "Adios" | | Lee Jin-hee | Lee Jin-hee | 1:02 |
| 13. | "Must Be a Nightmare" | | Kim Hong-jib | Kim Hong-jib | 0:32 |
| 14. | "Ordinary Man" | | Lee Jin-hee | Lee Jin-hee | 0:57 |
| 15. | "One Wooden Bridge" | | Lee Jin-hee | Lee Jin-hee | 0:57 |
| 16. | "Share a Great Deal of Pain" | | Lee Jin-hee | Lee Jin-hee | 2:23 |
| 17. | "Natural Born Hunter" | | Lee Jin-hee | Lee Jin-hee | 0:59 |
| 18. | "No Soy Coreano" | | Lee Jin-hee | Lee Jin-hee | 1:15 |
| 19. | "Hit the Pedal" | | Kim Hong-jib | Kim Hong-jib | 1:12 |
| 20. | "Nobody's Fault but Yours" | | Lee Jin-hee | Lee Jin-hee | 0:36 |
| 21. | "Beginner Driver" | | Lee Jin-hee | Lee Jin-hee | 2:19 |
| 22. | "Road to Gangwon" | | Lee Jin-hee | Lee Jin-hee | 0:47 |
| 23. | "I'm a Singer, Not a Hunter" | | Lee Jin-hee | Lee Jin-hee | 0:51 |
| 24. | "Swindler, Hunter, Dancer and Pig" | | Kim Hong-jib | Kim Hong-jib | 0:51 |
| 25. | "Weird Guys" | | Kim Hong-jib | Kim Hong-jib | 1:04 |
| 26. | "On My Way" | | Lee Jin-hee | Lee Jin-hee | 1:21 |
| 27. | "Nobody's Driving" | | Lee Jin-hee | Lee Jin-hee | 1:07 |
| 28. | "Let's Go" | | Lee Jin-hee | Lee Jin-hee | 2:58 |
| 29. | "Three Chances" | | Kim Hong-jib | Kim Hong-jib | 1:22 |
| 30. | "Hitchhiking" | | Lee Jin-hee | Lee Jin-hee | 0:31 |
| 31. | "Three Colors, One Heart" | | Lee Jin-hee | Lee Jin-hee | 1:48 |
| 32. | "You Belong to This" | | Lee Jin-hee | Lee Jin-hee | 0:51 |
| 33. | "Triangle" | | Lee Jin-hee | Lee Jin-hee | 1:07 |
| Total length: | | | | | 58:20 |

== Release ==
Wild Sing was released theatrically on June 3, 2026 by Lotte Entertainment. The film will be available on Netflix globally on July 31, 2026 (KST) and July 30, 2026 (PT).

== Reception ==
=== Box office ===
The film was released on June 3, 2026, on 1,351 screens.

According to the Korean Box Office Information System (KOBIS), as of July 6, 2026, the film has grossed US$8,344,907 from 1,308,421 admissions. The film's target break-even point was 2,000,000 admissions.

=== Accolades ===
| Award | Year | Category | Recipient(s) | Result | Ref. |
|---|---|---|---|---|---|
| Blue Dragon Film Awards | 2026 | Best Supporting Actor | Oh Jung-se | Pending | |
| Blue Dragon Film Awards | 2026 | Best Supporting Actress | Park Ji-hyun | Pending | |
| Blue Dragon Film Awards | 2026 | Best Music | Lee Jin-hee | Pending | |
| Blue Dragon Film Awards | 2026 | Technical Award (costume) | Kim Jung-won | Pending | |
| Buil Film Awards | 2026 | Best Supporting Actor | Oh Jung-se | Nominated | |
| Buil Film Awards | 2026 | Best Music | Lee Jin-hee | Nominated | |
| Korean Association of Film Critics Awards | 2026 | Best Supporting Actor | Oh Jung-se | Won | |
