= 3670 =

- Directed by: Park Joon-ho
- Screenplay by: Park Joon-ho
- Produced by: Hyein Lee
- Starring: Cho Yoo-hyun; Kim Hyun-mok; Cho Dae-hee
- Cinematography: Sang Kil Han
- Edited by: Park Joon-ho
- Music by: Soobin Lee
- Production company: Orot Film
- Distributed by: Atnine Film
- Release date: April 19, 2025 (SFFILM)
- Running time: 124 minutes
- Country: South Korea
- Language: Korean

3670 is a 2025 South Korean drama film directed by Park Joon-ho and released in 2025. The film stars Cho Yoo-hyun as Cheol-jun, a North Korean defector living in Seoul who is attempting to find his place in the city's gay community with the help of his new friend Yeong-jun (Kim Hyun-mok).

The film premiered at the San Francisco International Film Festival in April 2025, and had its Korean premiere at the Jeonju International Film Festival in May. It went into commercial release in September 2025.

== Synopsis ==
Cheol-jun, a young North Korean defector, has close friends who are like brothers to him but he lives with a deep loneliness, hiding his identity as a gay man. For the first time in his life, he gathers the courage to step into South Korea's gay community. With the help of Young-jun, a local friend he meets at a casual drinking meetup, Cheol-jun quickly begins to find his place. He grows close to others his age, and his relationship with Hyun-taek, whom he had quietly admired, begins to progress rapidly. However, a small misunderstanding threatens to shake everything Cheol-jun has built within the community. Having crossed to the South in search of freedom, Cheol-jun carries a secret he cannot even share with the friends who are like family to him.

== Cast ==
- Cho Yoo-hyun as Cheol-jun
- Kim Hyun-mok as Yeong-jun
- Cho Dae-hee as Hyeon-taek

== Reception ==
=== Critical response ===
Pat Mullen of That Shelf wrote that "Joonho Park offers an authentic coming-of-age story in Korea's underground queer community as Cheol-jun navigates love and friendship. This tender portrait intimately explores queer friendships in ways that few films do. It's not a tale of hot hook-ups, lusty encounters, and scenes of finding love through recreational sex. Instead, Park considers the bravery it takes to put oneself out there. The journey towards self-acceptance and self-love entailed before giving, or inspiring, that fateful swipe."

Pierce Conran of ScreenAnarchy wrote that "for most of its running time, 3670 offers a very engaging look at its characters and their environment, but once it tries to wrap its story in the final third, a few unfortunate cracks begin to appear. The plotting gets a little scattered as story beats begin to feel overly engineered with several instances of characters overhearing things at the wrong moment or reaching out to someone at exactly the right time despite weeks of no communication."

=== Accolades ===
Award ceremony	Year	Category	Recipient(s)	Result	Ref.
Baeksang Arts Awards	2026	Best New Director	Park Joon-ho	Won	
Baeksang Arts Awards	2026	Best Screenplay	Park Joon-ho	Nominated	
Baeksang Arts Awards	2026	Best New Actor	Cho Yoo-hyun	Nominated	
Blue Dragon Film Awards	2025	Best New Director	Park Joon-ho	Nominated	
Blue Dragon Film Awards	2025	Best New Actor	Cho Yoo-hyun	Nominated	
Buil Film Awards	2026	Best New Actor	Cho Yoo-hyun	Won	
Director's Cut Awards	2026	Best New Director (Film)	Park Joon-ho	Nominated	
Director's Cut Awards	2026	Best Vision (Film)	Park Joon-ho	Nominated	
Director's Cut Awards	2026	Best New Actor (Film)	Cho Yoo-hyun	Nominated	
Jeonju International Film Festival	2025	Best Actor	Kim Hyun-mok	Won	
Jeonju International Film Festival	2025	CGV Award		Won	
Jeonju International Film Festival	2025	Watcha's Award		Won	
Jeonju International Film Festival	2025	Distribution Support Prize		Won	
Korean Association of Film Critics Awards	2025	Best New Director	Park Joon-ho	Nominated	
Korean Association of Film Critics Awards	2025	Best New Actor	Cho Yoo-hyun	Nominated	
Palm Springs International Film Festival	2026	New Voices New Visions	Park Joon-ho	Won	
Vancouver International Film Festival	2025	Audience Award, Spotlight on Korea	Park Joon-ho	Won	
Wildflower Film Awards	2026	Best New Director	Park Joon-ho	Won	
