= Humint (film) =

2026 film by Ryoo Seung-wan

- Theatrical release poster
- Hangul: 휴민트
- RR: Hyuminteu
- MR: Hyumint'ŭ
- Directed by: Ryoo Seung-wan
- Written by: Ryoo Seung-wan
- Produced by: Kang Hye-jung; Jo Sung-min; Ryoo Seung-wan
- Starring: Zo In-sung; Park Jeong-min; Park Hae-joon; Shin Se-kyung
- Cinematography: Yang Hyun-suk
- Edited by: Bae Yeon-tae
- Music by: Jo Yeong-wook
- Production company: Filmmaker R&K
- Distributed by: Next Entertainment World
- Release date: February 11, 2026
- Running time: 119 minutes
- Country: South Korea
- Language: Korean
- Budget: $16 million
- Box office: $13.3 million

Humint (Korean: 휴민트) is a 2026 South Korean action spy film written and directed by Ryoo Seung-wan. Produced by Filmmaker R&K, the film stars Zo In-sung, Park Jeong-min, Park Hae-joon, and Shin Se-kyung, and follows South and North Korean intelligence agents who clash in Vladivostok, while investigating a criminal incident at the border. Distributed by Next Entertainment World (NEW), the film was released on February 11, 2026.

The film's title refers to human intelligence and marks the third entry in Ryoo's unofficial "Overseas Location" trilogy following the successes of The Berlin File (2013) and Escape from Mogadishu (2021). The project reunites Ryoo with Zo and Park, both of whom previously starred in the director's 2023 box-office hit Smugglers.

== Plot ==
In Vladivostok, Russia, South Korean National Intelligence Service Manager Zo is assigned to track an international crime syndicate operating near the border. His investigation intersects with Park Geon, a North Korean State Security official sent to investigate a recent security breach. The situation is complicated by Hwang Chi-seong, the North Korean consul general, whose personal interests conflict with the official mission. At the center of the intelligence gathering is Chae Seon-hwa, a worker at a North Korean restaurant. As the agents from both sides attempt to secure her as a human intelligence source, she is forced into a position of high risk.

== Cast ==
- Zo In-sung as Manager Zo
- Park Jeong-min as Park Geon
- Park Hae-joon as Hwang Chi-seong
- Shin Se-kyung as Chae Seon-hwa
- Jung Yoo-jin as Assistant Manager Lim
- Lee Shin-ki as Geum-tae
- Robert Maaser as Aleksei
- Kang Ha-kyung as Eun-pyo
- Lee Jun-young as Dong-cheol

== Production ==
=== Development ===
Ryoo Seung-wan confirmed his new project with a budget of ₩23.5 billion (approximately US$16 million) would be an espionage action film titled Humint, a category of intelligence derived from information collected and provided by human sources. It is produced by Filmmaker R&K and distributed by Next Entertainment World. The film was the final installment of Ryoo's unofficial "Overseas Location" trilogy, following The Berlin File (2013) and Escape from Mogadishu (2021).

=== Casting ===
Zo In-sung was in talks to appear in director Ryoo's film Humint in April 2024. This would make the third collaboration of Zo and Ryoo following Escape from Mogadishu (2021) and Smugglers (2023). By June 2024, the cast lineup were confirmed, including Zo, Park Jeong-min, Park Hae-joon, and Nana. Three months later, Nana stepped down due to scheduling conflicts and was replaced by Shin Se-kyung, this marks her first major film role in over a decade.

=== Filming ===
Principal photography began in October 2024, and set location filmed in Riga, Latvia to capture the unique landscape of Vladivostok.

=== Music ===
The movie end credits indicate the following three pieces of music: Darkness, a melody from Valse Hommage, Op. 21 by Florian Hermann; Kalinka from Ivan Larionov; Farewell (이별) composed by Gil Ok-yun and performed by Patti Kim.

== Marketing ==
Next Entertainment World released the first two posters, featuring the main characters, and the launch trailer of Humint on December 24, 2025. Following the initial teaser, the production released the four character posters on January 12, 2026, which were noted for their gritty, high-contrast style reflecting the tension of the Vladivostok setting. This was followed by the DDP Special Exhibition, which integrated these visual assets into an immersive physical space, allowing fans to experience the on-set memories of the cast and crew held for two weeks. This marked the first time the Dongdaemun Design Plaza hosted a dedicated exhibition for a single domestic motion picture. The same day, a press conference was held at Gwangjin District in Seoul.

== Release ==
Humint was released theatrically on February 11, 2026. To coincide with the film's release, the cast and director Ryoo embarked on an extensive nationwide promotional tour. Beginning on February 7, the "Team Humint" stage greetings covered major cities including Busan and Daegu before concluding with a series of events in Seoul throughout the Lunar New Year holiday (February 14–18). The tour included a "Mini GV" at the Busan Cinema Center and multiple appearances at major cinema chains like CGV, Lotte Cinema, and Megabox. Two months after the film's theatrical premiere, it was made available for streaming on Netflix on April 1, 2026.

== Reception ==
=== Box office ===
The Korean Film Council's integrated computer network for film tickets indicated that Humint attracted 116,717 viewers on its opening day on the 11th of February. As of March 8, 2026, the film has a cumulative total of 1,916,714 admissions. As of April, the movie attracted 1.98 million viewers, but fell short of the 4 million needed to break even.

=== Critical response ===
The Korea Herald's Moon Ki-hoon described the film as a "thriller long on spectacle" but "short on substance" adding that the cast's "performances keep afloat proceedings that grow more ludicrous by the minute". For Woo Jae-yeon of Yonhap News, director Ryoo Seung-wan's film "leans closer to romance than action" but the action sequences "operate as a storytelling device that sustains the film's romantic thread," "what lingers after the credits rolls is not the action but the humanity and the choices people make."

This movie scored an average score of 7.00 out of 10 on Cine 21.

=== Accolades ===
Award	Date of ceremony	Category	Recipient(s)	Result	Ref.
Baeksang Arts Awards	May 8, 2026	Best Supporting Actor	Park Hae-joon	Nominated	
Baeksang Arts Awards	May 8, 2026	Best Supporting Actress	Shin Se-kyung	Won	
Buil Film Awards	October 7, 2026	Best Cinematography	Yang Hyun-suk	Nominated	
Marie Claire Asia Star Awards	October 7, 2026	Actor of the Year Award	Zo In-sung	Won	
Blue Dragon Film Awards	November 25, 2026	Best Editing	Bae Yeon-tae	Pending	
Blue Dragon Film Awards	November 25, 2026	Best Cinematography and Lighting	Yang Hyun-suk	Pending	
Blue Dragon Film Awards	November 25, 2026	Technical Award (Stunt)	Lee Won-haeng	Pending	
