= Baeksang Arts Award for Best Director – Film =

Annual South Korean film award

- Awarded for: Best direction of a South Korean film
- Country: South Korea
- Presented by: Baeksang Arts Awards
- Most recent winner: Yoon Ga-eun; The World of Love (2026)
- Website: baeksangartsawards

The Baeksang Arts Award for Best Director – Film (Korean: 백상예술대상 영화부문 감독상; RR: Baeksang Yesul Daesang Yeonghwa Bumun Gamdoksang) is annually presented at the Baeksang Arts Awards ceremony.

== Winners and nominees ==
Table key
‡	Indicates the winner

=== 1960s ===
Year	Winner	Film	Original title
1965 (1st)	Shin Sang-ok ‡	Deaf Sam-yong	벙어리 삼룡
1966 (2nd)	Kim Soo-yong ‡	The Sea Village	갯마을
1967 (3rd)	Lee Man-hee ‡	Late Autumn	만추
1968 (4th)	Lee Man-hee ‡	Children of the Firing Range	싸리골의 신화
1969 (5th)	Lee Sung-gu ‡	The General's Mustache	장군의 수염

=== 1970s ===
Year	Winner	Film	Original title
1970 (6th)	Lee Sung-gu ‡	7 People in the Cellar	지하실의 7인
1971 (7th)	Jeong So-young ‡	Pilnyeo	필녀
1972 (8th)	Shin Sang-ok ‡	War and Humanity	전쟁과 인간
1973 (9th)	Kim Ki-young ‡	Insect Woman	충녀
1974 (10th)	Lee Won-se ‡	Special Investigation Unit: The Case of Bae Tae-ok	특별수사본부 배태옥 사건
1975 (11th)	Byun Jang-ho ‡	The Executioner	망나니
1976 (12th)	Im Kwon-taek ‡	A Byegone Romance	왕십리
1977 (13th)	Im Kwon-taek ‡	Commando on the Nakdong River	洛東江은 흐르는가
1978 (14th)	Kim Ho-sun ‡	Winter Woman	겨울여자
1979 (15th)	Kim Soo-yong ‡	The Terms of Love	사랑의 조건

=== 1980s ===
Year	Winner	Film	Original title
1980 (16th)	Lee Won-se ‡	A Ship with No Sails	돛대도 아니 달고
1981 (17th)	Lee Doo-yong ‡	The Hut	피막
1982 (18th)	Lee Won-se ‡	A Small Ball Shot by a Midget	난장이가 쏘아올린 작은 공
1983 (19th)	Im Kwon-taek ‡	Village in the Mist	안개마을
1984 (20th)	Byun Jang-ho ‡	Love and Farewell	사랑 그리고 이별
1985 (21st)	Bae Chang-ho ‡	Deep Blue Night	깊고 푸른 밤
1986 (22nd)	Lee Doo-yong ‡	Mulberry	뽕
1987 (23rd)	Byun Jang-ho ‡	Eve's Second Bedroom	이브의 건넌방
1988 (24th)	Park Chul-soo ‡	You My Rose Mellow	접시꽃 당신
1989 (25th)	Kim Ho-sun ‡	Rainbow Over Seoul	서울무지개

=== 1990s ===
Year	Winner	Film	Original title
1990 (26th)	Lee Doo-yong ‡	The Way to Cheong Song	청송으로 가는 길
1991 (27th)	Jang Kil-su ‡	Silver Stallion	은마는 오지 않는다
1992 (28th)	Bae Chang-ho ‡	Stairways of Heaven	천국의 계단
1993 (29th)	Park Jong-won ‡	Our Twisted Hero	우리들의 일그러진 영웅
1994 (30th)	Kang Woo-suk ‡	Two Cops	투캅스
1995 (31st)	Chung Ji-young ‡	Life and Death of the Hollywood Kid	헐리우드 키드의 생애
1996 (32nd)	Park Chul-soo ‡	Farewell My Darling	학생부군신위
1997 (33rd)	Im Kwon-taek ‡	Festival	축제
1998 (34th)	Chung Ji-young ‡	Blackjack	블랙잭
1999 (35th)	Kang Je-gyu ‡	Shiri	쉬리

=== 2000s ===
Year	Winners and nominees	Film	Original title
2000 (36th)	Im Kwon-taek ‡	Chunhyang	춘향뎐
2001 (37th)	Park Chan-wook ‡	Joint Security Area	공동경비구역 JSA
2001 (37th)	Yang Yun-ho	Libera Me	리베라 메
2001 (37th)	Hong Sang-soo	Virgin Stripped Bare by Her Bachelors	오! 수정
2002 (38th)	Hur Jin-ho ‡	One Fine Spring Day	봄날은 간다
2002 (38th)	Yim Soon-rye	Waikiki Brothers	와이키키 브라더스
2002 (38th)	Song Hae-sung	Failan	파이란
2003 (39th)	Lee Chang-dong ‡	Oasis	오아시스
2003 (39th)	Park Chan-wook	Sympathy for Mr. Vengeance	복수는 나의 것
2003 (39th)	Im Kwon-taek	Chi-hwa-seon	취화선
2004 (40th)	Park Chan-wook ‡	Oldboy	올드보이
2004 (40th)	Kang Woo-suk	Silmido	실미도
2004 (40th)	Kang Je-gyu	Taegukgi: The Brotherhood of War	태극기 휘날리며
2005 (41st)	Park Heung-sik ‡	My Mother, the Mermaid	인어공주
2005 (41st)	Im Sang-soo	The President's Last Bang	그때 그사람들
2005 (41st)	Kim Ki-duk	3-Iron	빈 집
2006 (42nd)	Lee Myung-se ‡	Duelist	형사 Duelist
2006 (42nd)	Kim Jee-woon	A Bittersweet Life	달콤한 인생
2006 (42nd)	Lee Joon-ik	King and the Clown	왕의 남자
2006 (42nd)	Park Chan-wook	Sympathy for Lady Vengeance	친절한 금자씨
2006 (42nd)	Park Jin-pyo	You Are My Sunshine	너는 내 운명
2007 (43rd)	Choi Dong-hoon ‡	Tazza: The High Rollers	타짜
2007 (43rd)	Bae Chang-ho	Road	길
2007 (43rd)	E J-yong	Dasepo Naughty Girls	다세포소녀
2007 (43rd)	Hong Sang-soo	Woman on the Beach	해변의 여인
2007 (43rd)	Kim Tae-yong	Family Ties	가족의 탄생
2008 (44th)	Lee Chang-dong ‡	Secret Sunshine	밀양
2008 (44th)	Kim Hyun-seok	Scout	스카우트
2008 (44th)	Lee Myung-se	M	M
2008 (44th)	Na Hong-jin	The Chaser	추격자
2008 (44th)	Yim Soon-rye	Forever the Moment	우리생애 최고의 순간
2009 (45th)	Lee Yoon-ki ‡	My Dear Enemy	멋진 하루
2009 (45th)	Kang Woo-suk	Public Enemy Returns	강철중: 공공의 적 1–1
2009 (45th)	Kim Jee-woon	The Good, the Bad, the Weird	좋은 놈, 나쁜 놈, 이상한 놈
2009 (45th)	Kim Yoo-jin	The Divine Weapon	신기전
2009 (45th)	Lee Joon-ik	Sunny	님은 먼곳에

=== 2010s ===
Year	Winners and nominees	Film	Original title
2010 (46th)	Jang Hoon ‡	Secret Reunion	의형제
2010 (46th)	Bong Joon-ho	Mother	마더
2010 (46th)	Kim Yong-hwa	Take Off	국가대표
2010 (46th)	Park Chan-ok	Paju	파주
2010 (46th)	Yoon Je-kyoon	Haeundae	해운대
2011 (47th)	Lee Chang-dong ‡	Poetry	시
2011 (47th)	Kang Woo-suk	Moss	이끼
2011 (47th)	Lee Jeong-beom	The Man from Nowhere	아저씨
2011 (47th)	Na Hong-jin	The Yellow Sea	황해
2011 (47th)	Ryoo Seung-wan	The Unjust	부당거래
2012 (48th)	Byun Young-joo ‡	Helpless	화차
2012 (48th)	Chung Ji-young	Unbowed	부러진 화살
2012 (48th)	Jeon Kye-soo	Love Fiction	러브픽션
2012 (48th)	Lee Han	Punch	완득이
2012 (48th)	Yoon Jong-bin	Nameless Gangster: Rules of the Time	범죄와의 전쟁 : 나쁜놈들 전성시대
2013 (49th)	Choo Chang-min ‡	Masquerade	광해, 왕이 된 남자
2013 (49th)	Choi Dong-hoon	The Thieves	도둑들
2013 (49th)	Kim Ki-duk	Pietà	피에타
2013 (49th)	Min Kyu-dong	All About My Wife	내 아내의 모든 것
2013 (49th)	Ryoo Seung-wan	The Berlin File	베를린
2014 (50th)	Bong Joon-ho ‡	Snowpiercer	설국열차
2014 (50th)	Hong Sang-soo	Our Sunhi	우리 선희
2014 (50th)	Cho Ui-seok; Kim Byeong-seo	Cold Eyes	감시자들
2014 (50th)	Kim Byung-woo	The Terror Live	더 테러 라이브
2014 (50th)	Lee Joon-ik	Hope	소원
2015 (51st)	Kim Seong-hun ‡	A Hard Day	끝까지 간다
2015 (51st)	Hong Sang-soo	Hill of Freedom	자유의 언덕
2015 (51st)	Im Kwon-taek	Revivre	화장
2015 (51st)	Yoon Je-kyoon	Ode to My Father	국제시장
2015 (51st)	Zhang Lü	Gyeongju	경주
2016 (52nd)	Ryoo Seung-wan ‡	Veteran	베테랑
2016 (52nd)	Choi Dong-hoon	Assassination	암살
2016 (52nd)	Lee Joon-ik	Dongju: The Portrait of a Poet	동주
2016 (52nd)	Oh Seung-wook	The Shameless	무뢰한
2016 (52nd)	Woo Min-ho	Inside Men	내부자들
2017 (53rd)	Kim Jee-woon ‡	The Age of Shadows	밀정
2017 (53rd)	Kim Sung-su	Asura: The City of Madness	아수라
2017 (53rd)	Na Hong-jin	The Wailing	곡성(哭聲)
2017 (53rd)	Park Chan-wook	The Handmaiden	아가씨
2017 (53rd)	Hong Sang-soo	On the Beach at Night Alone	밤의 해변에서 혼자
2018 (54th)	Kim Yong-hwa ‡	Along with the Gods: The Two Worlds	신과함께-죄와 벌
2018 (54th)	Yang Woo-suk	Steel Rain	강철비
2018 (54th)	Jang Joon-hwan	1987: When the Day Comes	1987
2018 (54th)	Jang Hoon	A Taxi Driver	택시운전사
2018 (54th)	Hwang Dong-hyuk	The Fortress	남한산성
2019 (55th)	Kang Hyeong-cheol ‡	Swing Kids	스윙키즈
2019 (55th)	Yoon Jong-bin	The Spy Gone North	공작
2019 (55th)	Lee Chang-dong	Burning	버닝
2019 (55th)	Lee Hae-young	Believer	독전
2019 (55th)	Jang Jae-hyun	Svaha: The Sixth Finger	사바하

=== 2020s ===
Year	Winners and nominees	Film	Original title
2020 (56th)	Kim Bora ‡	House of Hummingbird	벌새
2020 (56th)	Bong Joon-ho	Parasite	기생충
2020 (56th)	Woo Min-ho	The Man Standing Next	남산의 부장들
2020 (56th)	Lee Jong-eon	Birthday	생일
2020 (56th)	Chung Ji-young	Black Money	블랙머니
2021 (57th)	Hong Eui-jeong ‡	Voice of Silence	소리도 없이
2021 (57th)	Hong Won-chan	Deliver Us from Evil	다만 악에서 구하소서
2021 (57th)	Lee Jong-pil	Samjin Company English Class	삼진그룹 영어토익반
2021 (57th)	Lee Joon-ik	The Book of Fish	자산어보
2021 (57th)	Yoon Dan-bi	Moving On	남매의 여름밤
2022 (58th)	Byun Sung-hyun ‡	Kingmaker	킹메이커
2022 (58th)	Ryoo Seung-wan	Escape from Mogadishu	모가디슈
2022 (58th)	Park Dong-hoon	In Our Prime	이상한 나라의 수학자
2022 (58th)	Lee Jang-hoon	Miracle: Letters to the President	기적
2022 (58th)	Jeong Ga-young	Nothing Serious	연애 빠진 로맨스
2023 (59th)	Park Chan-wook ‡	Decision to Leave	헤어질 결심
2023 (59th)	Kim Han-min	Hansan: Rising Dragon	한산: 용의 출현
2023 (59th)	Ahn Tae-jin	The Night Owl	올빼미
2023 (59th)	Lee Jung-jae	Hunt	헌트
2023 (59th)	Jung Ju-ri	Next Sohee	다음 소희
2024 (60th)	Jang Jae-hyun	Exhuma	파묘
2024 (60th)	Kim Sung-su	12.12: The Day	서울의 봄
2024 (60th)	Kim Han-min	Noryang: Deadly Sea	노량: 죽음의 바다
2024 (60th)	Ryoo Seung-wan	Smugglers	밀수
2024 (60th)	Um Tae-hwa	Concrete Utopia	콘크리트 유토피아
2025 (61st)	Oh Seung-uk	Revolver	리볼버
2025 (61st)	Park Ri-woong	The Land of the Morning Calm	아침바다 갈매기는
2025 (61st)	Woo Min-ho	Harbin	하얼빈
2025 (61st)	E.oni	Love in the Big City	대도시의 사랑법
2025 (61st)	Lee Jong-pil	Escape	탈주
2026 (62nd)	Yoon Ga-eun	The World of Love	세계의 주인
2026 (62nd)	Kim Do-young	Once We Were Us	만약에 우리
2026 (62nd)	Park Chan-wook	No Other Choice	어쩔수가없다
2026 (62nd)	Byun Sung-hyun	Good News	굿뉴스
2026 (62nd)	Jang Hang-jun	The King's Warden	왕과 사는 남자

== Sources ==
- "Baeksang Arts Awards Nominees and Winners Lists". Naver Movie (in Korean).
- "Baeksang Arts Awards Winners Lists". Baeksang Arts Awards (in Korean).
