= The World of Love =

2025 film by Yoon Ga-eun

- Theatrical release poster
- Hangul: 세계의 주인
- RR: Segyeui juin
- MR: Segyeŭi chuin
- Directed by: Yoon Ga-eun
- Written by: Yoon Ga-eun
- Produced by: Kim Se-hun; Jenna Ku
- Starring: Seo Su-bin; Jang Hye-jin; Kim Jeong-sik; Kang Chae-yoon; Lee Jae-hee; Kim Ye-chang
- Cinematography: Kim Ji-hyun
- Edited by: Park Se-young
- Music by: Lee Min-hwi
- Production companies: Vol Media; Semosi
- Distributed by: Barunson E&A
- Release dates: September 7, 2025 (TIFF); October 22, 2025 (South Korea)
- Running time: 119 minutes
- Country: South Korea
- Language: Korean
- Box office: US$1.1 million

The World of Love (Korean: 세계의 주인; RR: Segye-ui Juin; lit. 'Juin in the world / owner of the world') is a 2025 South Korean drama film written and directed by Yoon Ga-eun. The film follows Lee Ju-in, a 17-year-old student who, confused by love, unleashes chaos with some words spoken in a moment of anger.

The film had its world premiere in the Platform section of the 2025 Toronto International Film Festival on September 7, 2025, where it competed for Platform Prize.

It was released in South Korean theaters on October 22, 2025, by Barunson E&A.

== Plot ==
Ju-in is a high school student who frequently changes boyfriends and appears to lead a carefree life centered around home, school, and taekwondo.

As the story progresses, it becomes clear that her mother, a kindergarten teacher, is struggling with an increasingly serious drinking problem. Her father has lived away from the family for years and is especially distant from his daughter, ignoring even her text messages. Her younger brother, who loves magic tricks, is deeply devoted to her and is keeping a secret.

When Su-ho, one of her classmates, launches a petition concerning the possible release of a child molester, Ju-in unexpectedly opposes the effort, having read in the petition's motivations some phrases that undermine the individuality of people who have emerged from these kinds of experiences. Her reaction suggests a personal connection to the issue, though she firmly denies it.

Tensions continue to build. After learning that Mi-do, an older friend from a volunteer organization, is pursuing legal action related to mistreatment she experienced while growing up, it becomes apparent that Ju-in's difficulties in forming deeper romantic relationships stem from unresolved childhood trauma.

It is eventually revealed that a relative on her father's side, who is likely now incarcerated, has taken advantage of her for years. As a result, Ju-in harbors deep resentment toward her mother, who devoted so much attention to the children in her care while failing to recognize what was happening within her own family.

The emotional wounds prove to be far more significant than Ju-in is willing to acknowledge. When Su-ho revives his campaign around the petition, she reacts angrily, and the confrontation leads both of them to the principal's office. There, she finally finds the courage to speak openly about her past.

Her disclosure places strain on her friendships. Rather than fully understanding her pain, some of her friends feel unsettled by the realization that she had hidden such an important part of herself for years.

Shaken by her daughter's outburst, the mother calls on her husband to fulfill his responsibilities as a father, but then ends up in the hospital with a gallbladder problem that turns out to be an early warning sign of developing liver cirrhosis. The family crisis ultimately brings them closer together. Ju-in discovers that her younger brother has been intercepting letters from their uncle for years in an effort to protect her, while her father rewrites a message to her after years of silence.

Back at school, Ju-in reconnects with her closest friend, Yu-ra. Around the same time, a classmate who had previously sent anonymous notes criticizing her behavior sends one final message. This time, however, it is a note of gratitude. Without revealing his identity, he explains that he has faced similar struggles and expresses both solidarity with Ju-in and admiration for the courage she has shown.

== Cast ==
- Seo Su-bin as Lee Ju-in
- Jang Hye-jin as Kang Tae-sun, Joo-in's mother
- Kim Jeong-sik as Jang Su-ho
- Kang Chae-yoon as Gong Yu-ra
- Lee Jae-hee as Lee Hae-in
- Kim Ye-chang as Park Chan-woo
- Go Min-si as Han Mi-do
- Kim Suk-hoon as Lee Ki-dong

== Release ==
The World of Love had its world premiere at the 2025 Toronto International Film Festival on September 7, 2025, in Platform section. The film is eligible for People's Choice Awards, which is decided by audience voting.

It was invited to compete in the Crouching Tigers section, the international competition for new filmmakers at the 9th Pingyao International Film Festival in September 2025. It was nominated in three categories for the Roberto Rossellini Awards: Best Film, Best Director, and the Jury Prize It also competed at the Warsaw Film Festival in the International Competition section on October 11, 2025.

It was also selected to compete in the Official Competition section of the 2025 BFI London Film Festival for the best film award and had the screening on October 14, 2025. On October 25, 2025, it was presented in International Perspective section of the São Paulo International Film Festival.

On November 2, it was screened at the Hong Kong Asian Film Festival in Cineaste Delights section. In November it also competed at the Three Continents Festival in the international competition and won the grand prize the Montgolfière d'or.

It competed in the 20th Jogja-NETPAC Asian Film Festival on December 5, 2025 and then in the Red Sea: Competition strand at the Red Sea International Film Festival on December 6, 2025.

In 2026, it will be featured in Asiascope section of Filmfest Hamburg on 26 September.

In February 2025, the film was presented at the European Film Market (EFM), which is held in Berlin, in conjunction with the Berlin International Film Festival by the South Korea's sales and production company Barunson E&A, who have acquired world sales rights of the film.

It was released on October 22, 2025, in South Korean theatres.

The film has distribution agreements with Japanese distributor Bitters End, Hong Kong's Edko Films, and Taiwan's Andrews Film. It has also entered into distribution agreement with the Chinese distribution Light Films Limited on October 19, 2025.

== Reception ==
=== Box office ===
The film was released on October 22, 2025, on 358 screens.

As of November 26, 2025, the film has grossed US$919,299 from 139,312 admissions.

=== Critical response ===
Shim Sun-ah of Yonhap News Agency, reviewing the film praised it for its carefully constructed storytelling and lifelike characters. Shim wrote, the film "weaves together seemingly unrelated events into a cohesive, resonant narrative," with early moments that seem minor eventually connecting to the central theme and sustaining a quiet sense of tension. Shim commended Seo Su-bin's debut as "remarkable," noting her ability to portray a wide range of teenage emotions—from "radiant, carefree charm" to the "raw devastation of a complete breakdown." Jang Hye-jin was also praised for her "magnificent performance" as Ju-in's mother, a character who supports her daughter's trauma and joins her on the journey toward healing.

Wendy Ide senior International critic of ScreenDaily at the BFI London Film Festival, reviewing the film praised it for its unique storytelling style, noting that director Yoon presents the narrative in "fractured glimpses," which Ide said mirrors the restless nature of teenage attention. Ide noted a key emotional moment set in a carwash, where Yoon Ga-eun "leaves the camera running when it counts," allowing the scene to unfold with raw intensity because of Seo Su-bin's powerful performance. While Ide felt that not every creative choice was successful; describing the repeated use of a "twinkly piano rendition" of Johann Sebastian Bach's "Sheep may safely graze" as a "tonal mismatch" with the film's "dynamic energy". Ide concluded that overall, the film "works well," offering a story that "takes its time to piece together and is all the more rewarding for its gradual reveal."

=== Accolades ===
Award	Year	Category	Recipient(s)	Result	Ref.
Asia Pacific Screen Awards	2025	Best Youth Film	The World of Love	Nominated	
Baeksang Arts Awards	2026	Best Film	The World of Love	Nominated	
Baeksang Arts Awards	2026	Gucci Impact Award	The World of Love	Nominated	
Baeksang Arts Awards	2026	Best Director	Yoon Ga-eun	Won	
Baeksang Arts Awards	2026	Best Screenplay	Yoon Ga-eun	Nominated	
Baeksang Arts Awards	2026	Best Supporting Actress	Jang Hye-jin	Nominated	
Baeksang Arts Awards	2026	Best New Actress	Seo Su-bin	Won	
Bechdel Day	2026	Bechdel Choice 10 — Film	The World of Love	Won	
Bechdel Day	2026	Bechdelian in Film — Director of the Year	Yoon Ga-eun	Won	
BFI London Film Festival	2025	Best Film	The World of Love	Nominated	
Blue Dragon Film Awards	2026	Best Film	The World of Love	Pending	
Blue Dragon Film Awards	2026	Best Director	Yoon Ga-eun	Pending	
Blue Dragon Film Awards	2026	Best Supporting Actress	Jang Hye-jin	Pending	
Blue Dragon Film Awards	2026	Best New Actress	Seo Su-bin	Pending	
Blue Dragon Film Awards	2026	Best Screenplay	Yoon Ga-eun	Pending	
Buil Film Awards	2026	Best Film	The World of Love	Won	
Buil Film Awards	2026	Best Director	Yoon Ga-eun	Nominated	
Buil Film Awards	2026	Best Screenplay	Yoon Ga-eun	Nominated	
Buil Film Awards	2026	Best Actress	Seo Su-bin	Won	
Buil Film Awards	2026	Best New Actress	Seo Su-bin	Nominated	
Buil Film Awards	2026	Best Supporting Actress	Jang Hye-jin	Nominated	
Chunsa Film Art Awards	2025	Best Director	Yoon Ga-eun	Won	
Chunsa Film Art Awards	2025	Best New Actress	Seo Su-bin	Won	
Director's Cut Awards	2026	Best Director (Film)	Yoon Ga-eun	Nominated	
Director's Cut Awards	2026	Best Screenplay (Film)	Yoon Ga-eun	Won	
Director's Cut Awards	2026	Best Vision (Film)	Yoon Ga-eun	Won	
Director's Cut Awards	2026	Best Actress (Film)	Seo Su-bin	Won	
Director's Cut Awards	2026	Best New Actress (Film)	Kang Chae-yun	Nominated	
Director's Cut Awards	2026	Best New Actress (Film)	Go Min-si	Nominated	
Korean Film Producers Association Awards	2025	Best Film	The World of Love	Won	
Korean Film Producers Association Awards	2025	Best New Actress	Seo Su-bin	Won	
Pingyao International Film Festival	2025	Roberto Rossellini Award: Jury Award	The World of Love	Won	
Pingyao International Film Festival	2025	Audience Award	The World of Love	Won	
Red Sea International Film Festival	2025	Yusr Best Actress	Seo Su-bin	Won	
Three Continents Festival	2025	Golden Montgolfière	The World of Love	Won	
Toronto International Film Festival	2025	People's Choice Award	The World of Love	Nominated	
Toronto International Film Festival	2025	Platform Prize	The World of Love	Nominated	
Warsaw Film Festival	2025	Warsaw Grand Prix	The World of Love	Nominated	
Wildflower Film Awards	2026	Best Screenplay	Yoon Ga-eun	Won	
Wildflower Film Awards	2026	Best Editing – Staff	Park Se-young	Won	
Korean Association of Film Critics Awards	2026	Best New Actress	Seo Su-bin	Won	
Korean Association of Film Critics Awards	2026	Top 10 Films of the Year	The World of Love	Won	
