= People and Meat =

2025 film by Yang Jong-hyun

- Theatrical release poster
- Hangul: 사람과 고기
- RR: Saramgwa gogi
- MR: Saramgwa kogi
- Directed by: Yang Jong-hyun
- Written by: Lim Na-moo
- Produced by: Jang So-jeong
- Starring: Park Geun-hyung; Jang Yong; Ye Soo-jung
- Cinematography: Lee Sung-eun
- Edited by: Son Jin-woo
- Music by: Choi Hye-ri
- Production company: Film Dorothy
- Distributed by: Triple Pictures
- Release dates: June 6, 2025 (Tribeca); October 7, 2025 (South Korea)
- Running time: 106 minutes
- Country: South Korea
- Language: Korean

People and Meat (Korean: 사람과 고기) is a 2025 South Korean drama film directed by Yang Jong-hyun which follows three elderly people in Seoul who dash out of restaurants without paying. It premiered at the 2025 Tribeca Festival.

The film stars Park Geun-hyung, Jang Yong, and Ye Soo-jung. The screenplay was written by Lim Na-moo and is a commentary on how South Korean society neglects the elderly.

== Plot ==
The film follows three characters: U-sik, Hyeon-jung, and Hwa-jin. U-sik and Hyeon-jung are men in their eighties who browse the streets in the early mornings, looking to find cardboard to sell for pennies at a time. Hwa-jin, also elderly, makes her living selling on the street vegetables discarded by the vegetable market.

After initially coming to blows over cardboard in front of Hwa-jin's stall, U-sik and Hyeon-jung befriend each other. Neither of them have the skill to cook a certain dish they'd like to eat, and so rope in Hwa-jin to help. And thus, partly out of loneliness, the three become friends, gradually telling their life stories.

One day, U-sik invites the other two out for dinner. They enjoy a meal mostly consisting of delicious meats. U-sik reveals at the end of the meal, however, that he does not have money to pay for it, and tells his companions how to leave the restaurant without paying. While initially surprised, Hyeon-jung and Hwa-jin follow U-sik's plan. The three companions altogether experience a thrill from not paying. On one occasion U-sik collapses in the restaurant, and at the hospital it is revealed that he has cancer. They nevertheless continue with their escapade. They are eventually caught, but due to their age are given just a fine. However, U-sik causes a disturbance in the court house, accusing the judge of being corrupt; and even later finds out where he lives and destroys part of his house in an arson attack - for which he is then sent to prison. On his release he moves in with Hyeon-jung, who has been selling his possessions to get by. One morning he wakes to find U-sik gone, leaving a message saying he'll keep in touch. Hyeon-jung and Hwa-jin next hear that he has died. At his funeral a single guest appears, who tells them that he was U-sik's student and that U-sik was in fact a published poet, something that Hyeon-jung and Hwa-jin didn't know about their friend. He himself had told them that he had accomplished nothing in life and that the greatest moments of his life was the three of them dining and dashing from restaurants.

== Cast ==
- Park Geun-hyung as Hyeon-jung
- Jang Yong as U-sik
- Ye Soo-jung as Hwa-jin

== Production ==
The film was produced by KT Studios, directed by Yang Jong-hyun with the screenplay written by Lim Namoo.

== Reception ==
=== Critical response ===
Joan MacDonald of Forbes observes "In this film the stolen meals become a metaphor for the nourishment these characters derive from engaging with each other." She writes "The film also becomes a wistful poem about life and aging, one that observes the injustice of old age with humor and kindness."

=== Accolades ===
Award ceremony	Year	Category	Recipient(s)	Result	Ref.
Baeksang Arts Awards	2026	Best Screenplay	Lim Na-moo	Nominated	
Baeksang Arts Awards	2026	Best Supporting Actor	Jang Yong	Nominated	
Baeksang Arts Awards	2026	Gucci Impact Award	People and Meat	Nominated	
Director's Cut Awards	2026	Best Vision (Film)	Yang Jong-hyun	Nominated	
Buil Film Awards	2026	Best Film	People and Meat	Nominated	
Buil Film Awards	2026	Best Screenplay	Lim Na-moo	Nominated	
Korean Association of Film Critics Awards	2026	Best Supporting Actress	Ye Soo-jung	Won	
Korean Association of Film Critics Awards	2026	FIPRESCI Award (Domestic)	Yang Jong-hyun	Won	
Korean Association of Film Critics Awards	2026	Top 10 Films of the Year	People and Meat	Won	
