= The House of Us =

2019 film by Yoon Ga-eun

- Theatrical release poster
- Hangul: 우리집
- RR: Urijip
- MR: Urijip
- Directed by: Yoon Ga-eun
- Written by: Yoon Ga-eun
- Produced by: Kim Ji-hye; Kim Se-hoon
- Starring: Kim Na-yeon; Kim Si-a; Joo Ye-rim
- Cinematography: Kim Ji-hyun
- Edited by: Park Se-young
- Music by: Yeon Ri-mok
- Production company: ATO
- Distributed by: Lotte Entertainment
- Release date: August 22, 2019
- Running time: 92 minutes
- Country: South Korea
- Language: Korean
- Box office: US$339,356

The House of Us (Korean: 우리집) is a 2019 South Korean drama film written and directed by Yoon Ga-eun and stars Kim Na-yeon, Kim Si-a, and Joo Ye-rim. Distributed by Lotte Entertainment, the film was released in South Korea on August 22, 2019.

== Plot ==
Hana is a 12-year-old girl who, along with her 16-year-old brother Chan, witnesses her parents' arguments every day. Her mother seems consumed by a demanding job, while her father often comes home drunk.

Having been chosen as the top student in her class, Hana begins her summer vacation with goals that will allow her to learn useful skills such as doing household chores and cooking, while also easing her mother's burden so that she might be less aggressive toward her father. Although her mother understands Hana's intentions, she would rather have her daughter focus on her studies and does not believe she needs any help.

After a chance encounter with two sisters, Yoo-mi and Yoo-jin, Hana begins spending time with them and notices similarities between their families. The girls' parents are always away working, but the hardest thing for them to endure is the constant moving. In fact, although they have only recently relocated, they will soon have to move again.

Hana organizes a form of passive resistance campaign, amusing herself by helping the two younger girls sabotage visits from prospective new tenants. When she later discovers that her father is having an affair, she hides his cell phone and devises what she believes is the only way to save her family: organizing a trip for everyone to take together.

She devotes herself wholeheartedly to the plan and eventually succeeds in persuading her reluctant parents. However, on the eve of the departure, pleasantly surprised to see her parents talking calmly and peacefully, she overhears their conversation and learns that they have already agreed to divorce and that, at the end of this last trip together, they plan to tell the children.

The following morning, instead of leaving with her family, Hana runs away to her two friends and convinces them to embark on a journey to visit their parents at their workplace, hoping to persuade them not to move again. The plan fails because the three girls get lost in the complicated public transportation network, though they fortunately manage to find a comfortable place to spend the night.

When Hana returns home, she finds nobody there. She begins cooking and prepares a meal for the whole family. When her family finally returns, they are furious, having even called the police to help find her. But Hana reassures everyone and invites them to sit down and eat the meal she has prepared. After all, before a journey, one should have a good meal.

== Cast ==
- Kim Na-yeon as Hana
- Kim Si-a as Yoo-mi
- Joo Ye-rim as Yoo-jin
- Ahn Ji-ho as Chan

== Release ==
The House of Us was released on 147 screens in South Korea through Lotte Entertainment on August 22, 2019. On October 5, the film was presented at the BFI London Film Festival.

== Reception ==
=== Box office ===
During its opening week, the film attracted 16,002 viewers and ranked 13th at the weekly box office. In its second week, it drew 15,500 viewers, placing 14th in the weekly box office rankings, and surpassed a cumulative audience of 30,000 admissions.

=== Accolades ===
Award ceremony	Year	Category	Recipient(s)	Result	Ref.
Chunsa Film Art Awards	2020	Best Screenplay	Yoon Ga-eun	Nominated	
Chunsa Film Art Awards	2020	Best New Actress	Kim Na-yeon	Nominated	
Director's Cut Awards	2019	Best Independent Film Director	Yoon Ga-eun	Nominated	
Hong Kong Asian Film Festival	2019	Best New Director	The House of Us	Won	
