= Baeksang Arts Award for Best New Actress – Film =

Korean film award

- 2026 recipient: Seo Su-bin
- Awarded for: Best performance by a new actress in a South Korean film
- Country: South Korea
- Presented by: Baeksang Arts Awards
- Most recent winner: Seo Su-bin; The World of Love (2026)
- Website: baeksangartsawards

The Baeksang Arts Award for Best New Actress – Film (Korean: 백상예술대상 영화부문 여자 신인 연기상; RR: Baeksang Yesul Daesang Yeonghwa Bumun Yeoja Sinin Yeongisang) is an award presented annually at the Baeksang Arts Awards ceremony organised by Ilgan Sports and JTBC Plus, affiliates of JoongAng Ilbo, usually in the second quarter of each year in Seoul or Busan.

== List of winners ==
#	Year	Actress	Film
3rd	1967	Moon Hee	
3rd	1967	Nam Jeong-im	
4th	1968	Yoon Jeong-hee	Mist
5th	1969	Jeon Yang-ja	
6th	1970	Kim Ji-soo	
7th	1971	Kim Yun-jeong	Pilnyeo
8th	1972	Na O-mi	Spring, Summer, Fall, and Winter
9th	1973	Park Ji-yeong	A Lady Born in the Year of Rat
10th	1974	Jin Do-hee	Lovers of Seoul
10th	1974	Myeong Hui	Sunday Guests
11th	1975	Moon Sook	A Girl Who Looks Like the Sun
11th	1975	Yang Jeong-hwa	Maturity
12th	1976	Kim Hyeong-ja	Pebble
13th	1977	Myeong Hyeon-suk	We Are Friends
13th	1977	Yu Mi-na	Cuckoo's Dolls
14th	1978	Jung Hee	Once Upon a Long Time Ago
15th	1979	Lee In-ok	Portrait of a Rock
16th	1980	Won Mi-kyung	You Are My Destiny
17th	1981	Lee Mi-sook	The Bird of Fire
17th	1981	Kim Min-hee	The One I Love
18th	1982	Ahn So-young	Madame Aema
18th	1982	Na Young-hee	Children of Darkness Part 1
19th	1983	Park Seon-hui	Winter Woman, Part II
20th	1984	Lee Bo-hee	Declaration of Fools
21st	1985	Cho Yong-won	The Blazing Sun
22nd	1986	Lee Hye-young	Queen Bee
23rd	1987	Kim Hye-soo	Ggambo
24th	1988	Ha Hee-ra	Campus Romance Seminar
24th	1988	Shin Hye-soo	Adada
25th	1989	Jin Yeong-mi	Come Come Come Upward
26th	1990	Lee Mi-yeon	Happiness Does Not Come In Grades
27th	1991	Kim Sung-ryung	Who Saw the Dragon's Toenails?
27th	1991	Ji Gyeong-won	Rain Tomorrow
28th	1992	Lee Ah-ro	Stairway of Heaven
29th	1993	Oh Yeon-soo	Sorrow, Like a Withdrawn Dagger, Left My Heart
30th	1994	Ji Su-won	Two Cops
30th	1994	Ryu Keum-sin	Dawn of Labor
31st	1995	Jung Sun-kyung	To You from Me
32nd	1996	Kim Sun-jae	A Single Spark
33rd	1997	Lee Eun-jung	Yuri
34th	1998	Choi Ji-woo	The Hole
35th	1999	Jun Ji-hyun	White Valentine
36th	2000	Ensemble cast	Memento Mori
37th	2001	Suh Jung	The Isle
38th	2002	Lee Yo-won	Take Care of My Cat
39th	2003	Son Ye-jin	The Classic
40th	2004	Yoon Jin-seo	Oldboy
41st	2005	Soo Ae	A Family
42nd	2006	Jung Yu-mi	Blossom Again
43rd	2007	Park Si-yeon	The Fox Family
44th	2008	Han Ye-seul	Miss Gold Digger
45th	2009	Park Bo-young	Scandal Makers
46th	2010	Jo An	Lifting King Kong
47th	2011	Shin Hyun-been	He's on Duty
48th	2012	Bae Suzy	Architecture 101
49th	2013	Han Ye-ri	As One
50th	2014	Kim Hyang-gi	Thread of Lies
51st	2015	Chun Woo-hee	Han Gong-ju
52nd	2016	Park So-dam	The Priests
53rd	2017	Lee Sang-hee	Our Love Story
54th	2018	Choi Hee-seo	Anarchist from Colony
55th	2019	Lee Jae-in	Svaha: The Sixth Finger
56th	2020	Kang Mal-geum	Lucky Chan-sil
57th	2021	Choi Jung-woon	Moving On
58th	2022	Lee Yoo-mi	Young Adult Matters
59th	2023	Kim Si-eun	Next Sohee
60th	2024	Kim Hyung-seo	Hopeless
61st	2025	Roh Yoon-seo	Hear Me: Our Summer
62nd	2026	Seo Su-bin	The World of Love

== Sources ==
- "Baeksang Arts Awards Nominees and Winners Lists". Naver Movie (in Korean).
- "Baeksang Arts Awards Winners Lists". Baeksang Arts Awards (in Korean).
