= Pavane (film) =

2026 film by Lee Jong-pil

- Release poster
- Hangul: 파반느
- RR: Pabanneu
- MR: P'abannŭ
- Directed by: Lee Jong-pil
- Screenplay by: Lee Jong-pil; Son Mi
- Based on: Pavane for a Dead Princess by Park Min-gyu
- Produced by: Park Eun-kyung
- Starring: Go Ah-sung; Byun Yo-han; Moon Sang-min
- Cinematography: Kim Sung-an
- Edited by: Lee Kang-hee
- Music by: Minhwi Lee
- Production companies: The Lamp; Plus M Entertainment
- Distributed by: Netflix
- Release date: February 20, 2026 (Netflix)
- Running time: 113 minutes
- Country: South Korea
- Language: Korean

Pavane (Korean: 파반느) is a 2026 South Korean romantic drama film directed by Lee Jong-pil. It stars Go Ah-sung, Byun Yo-han, and Moon Sang-min. Produced under The Lamp, the film is based on the novel Pavane for a Dead Princess written by author Park Min-gyu, and it tells the story of a woman who was deemed unattractive by society, and a man who sees beyond her looks. It was released on Netflix on February 20, 2026.

== Synopsis ==
Three emotionally withdrawn individuals whose lives intersect around a department store gradually form a close bond. Mi-jung, a stockroom employee, lives in self-imposed isolation to avoid the scrutiny of others. Yo-han, who works in the parking garage, is an outgoing and free-spirited man with a passion for rock music. Kyung-rok, meanwhile, has abandoned his youthful aspirations in favor of a stable but unfulfilling life.

Kyung-rok is immediately drawn to Mi-jung. Yo-han encourages their growing relationship while also developing a close friendship with both of them. As the three spend more time together, Mi-jung and Kyung-rok's relationship gradually deepens, while their shared experiences help each of them confront personal insecurities and emotional wounds.

== Cast ==
- Go Ah-sung as Mi-jung
- Byun Yo-han as Yo-han
- Moon Sang-min as Kyung-rok
- Lee E-dam as Se-ra
- Han Yu-eun as Hyeon-ji
- Seo Yi-ra as Suk-hul
- Kwon Do-kyun as Hyeong-geun
- Jang Yo-hoon as Dong-hwan
- Shin Jung-geun as Kentucky Hope
- Park Hae-joon as Kyung-rok's father
- Lee Bong-ryun as Kyung-rok's mother
- Lee Sang-jin as Pretentious guy

== Production ==
On April 2, 2024, Byun Yo-han was cast. The next day, Go Ah-sung, Moon Sang-min, and Byun reportedly confirmed their appearances, and the film was already in pre-production.

Principal photography commenced on May 8, 2024, and concluded in August 2024.

== Release ==
Pavane premiered on Netflix on February 20, 2026.

== Accolades ==
Award	Date of ceremony	Category	Recipient(s)	Result	Ref.
Baeksang Arts Awards	May 8, 2026	Best Actress	Go Ah-sung	Nominated	
Baeksang Arts Awards	May 8, 2026	Best New Actor	Moon Sang-min	Nominated	
Baeksang Arts Awards	May 8, 2026	Best Technical Achievement	Minhwi Lee	Won	
Baeksang Arts Awards	May 8, 2026	Gucci Impact Award	Pavane	Nominated	
Golden Cinematography Awards	June 8, 2026	Best New Actor	Moon Sang-min	Won	
Buil Film Awards	October 7, 2026	Best Actress	Go Ah-sung	Nominated	
Buil Film Awards	October 7, 2026	Best New Actor	Moon Sang-min	Nominated	
Buil Film Awards	October 7, 2026	Best Music	Minhwi Lee	Won	
Korean Association of Film Critics Awards	November 4, 2026	Best Music	Minhwi Lee	Won	
Korean Association of Film Critics Awards	November 4, 2026	Top 10 Films of the Year	Pavane	Won	
