= Funky Freaky Freaks =

2025 South Korean drama film

- Hangul: 충충충
- RR: Chungchungchung
- MR: Ch'ungch'ungch'ung
- Directed by: Han Chang-lok
- Screenplay by: Han Chang-lok
- Produced by: Bae Young-kyung; Lee Ji-won
- Starring: Joo Min-hyeong; Baek Ji-hye; Jeong Soo-hyun; Shin Jun-hang
- Cinematography: Kim Jong-soo
- Edited by: Kim Ji-hyun; Han Chang-lok
- Music by: Livigesh
- Production companies: Korea National University of Arts; apocofilm
- Distributed by: At Nine Film
- Release date: September 20, 2025 (Busan)
- Running time: 87 minutes
- Country: South Korea
- Language: Korean

Funky Freaky Freaks (Korean: 충충충) is a 2025 Korean comedy film directed by Han Chang-lok about teenagers on the fringes of Seoul society. It won the Special Jury Award at the 2025 Busan International Film Festival.

== Plot ==
The movie follows a group of three teenage friends: Yong-gi, an ordinary boy; Ji-sook, a girl with a messy home life; and Dum-bo, an effeminate boy who sometimes pretends to be a girl on the phone.

Outside of class, the three friends engage in mischief. They administer pranks, such as through selling used panties to perverts. Yong-gi looks after Ji-sook. The dynamics of the trio are disrupted by the arrival of new transfer student Woo-joo, which causes jealousy and conflict.

== Cast ==
- Joo Min-hyeong as Yong-gi
- Baek Ji-hye as Ji-sook
- Jeong Soo-hyun as Woo-joo
- Shin Jun-hang as Dum-bo

== Production ==
The film was a feature project of the Korea National University of Arts (K'Arts).

== Style ==
The film is characterized by handheld photography, jump cuts, and animation.

The film uses colorful framing, and is split into three chapters. These three chapters are denoted 'impulse', 'collision' and 'shock' and depict the evolution of the relationships and futures of the characters.

== Release ==
Funky Freaky Freaks competed in the Competition section of the 30th Busan International Film Festival on September 20, 2025.

The film was showcased in the Korean Horizons section of the 25th New York Asian Film Festival on 19 July 2026.

== Reception ==
Pierce Conran of ScreenAnarchy notes while “Han's overall style isn't exactly new”, the film’s “contemporary mix of media makes it feel fresh, particularly when contrasted with its frequently polished but occasionally dry indie peers.”

Oris Aigbokhaevbolo of The Film Verdict writes “Funky Freaky Freaks is worth the time spent with its crazy young people as they hurtle towards the bleak future they have created for themselves.”.

== Accolades ==
Award ceremony	Year	Category	Nominee / Work	Result	Ref.
Busan International Film Festival	2025	Special Jury Award	Funky Freaky Freaks	Won	
Buil Film Awards	2026	Best New Actor	Joo Min-hyung	Nominated	
Buil Film Awards	2026	Best New Director	Han Chang-rok	Nominated	
