= Once We Were Us =

2025 film by Kim Do-young

- Theatrical release poster
- Hangul: 만약에 우리
- RR: Manyage uri
- MR: Manyage uri
- Directed by: Kim Do-young
- Screenplay by: Yeon Moon-kyoung; Kim Ha-na
- Based on: Us and Them by Rene Liu
- Produced by: Heo Seong-jin
- Starring: Koo Kyo-hwan; Moon Ga-young
- Cinematography: Shin Tae-ho
- Edited by: Lee Gang-hee
- Music by: Kim Jang-woo
- Production company: Covenant Pictures
- Distributed by: Showbox
- Release date: December 31, 2025
- Running time: 115 minutes
- Country: South Korea
- Language: Korean
- Box office: US$17.8 million

Once We Were Us (Korean: 만약에 우리) is a 2025 South Korean romantic drama film directed by Kim Do-young and starring Koo Kyo-hwan and Moon Ga-young. It is a remake of the 2018 Chinese film Us and Them directed by Rene Liu. Distributed by Showbox, the film was released in South Korea on December 31, 2025.

== Synopsis ==
Eun-ho boards an express bus heading to his hometown, while Jeong-won, having decided to leave somewhere after taking a break from school, gets on as well. By chance, the two end up sitting next to each other and form an unexpected connection. Cheering on each other's dreams and leaning on one another, the two gradually seep into each other's daily lives and grow into lovers. They laugh, fight, and make up, loving each other passionately as if they own the whole world, but in the face of reality, they ultimately choose different paths. And then, ten years later, when they meet again, Eun-ho finally says the words he had kept buried for so long to Jeong-won.

== Cast ==
- Koo Kyo-hwan as Lee Eun-ho
- Moon Ga-young as Han Jeong-won
- Shin Jung-geun as Eun-ho's father
- Lee Sang-yeob as Kang Min-jae
- Kim Seo-won as Park Seung-chan
- Im Jae-hyuk as Oh Gyeong-seok
- Kim So-yul as Go Yun-jin
- Kang Mal-geum as Eun-ho's mother

== Production ==
=== Development ===
Director Kim Do-young revealed in an interview that the film is set in 2008, a time when many young people felt anxious about the future due to changes in the social environment. In depicting Seoul, the film deliberately emphasizes the contrast between areas dense with high-rise buildings and less crowded districts. In addition, the film largely preserves the overall structure of the original work, such as using color and black-and-white footage to distinguish past and present, but makes many adjustments in details like the performances.

=== Casting ===
In December 2023, South Korean media reported that Koo Kyo-hwan and Moon Ga-young were in talks to star in the new film Us and Them. The film is a remake of the Chinese film of the same name starring Jing Boran and Zhou Dongyu, and is scheduled to begin filming in March 2024.

== Marketing and release ==
The first trailer was released on November 13, 2025, and it was announced that the film would be officially released in South Korea on December 31 of the same year.

== Reception ==
=== Box office ===
The film was released on December 31, 2025, on 961 screens. It opened at second place at the South Korean box office with 110,326 admissions. The film has grossed US$17,758,350 from 2,596,635 admissions. It "defied expectations" in the box office according to The Korea Times. The film led the Korean box office for four weeks. Its box office success is attributed to its focus on emotional depth.

=== Critical response ===
John Liu and Joanne Soh of The Straits Times gave the film four out of five stars. They wrote that the film: "delivers a smart dissection of love’s tragic irony, earning its tearjerker moments through emotionally grounded storytelling."

=== Accolades ===
Award	Date of ceremony	Category	Recipient(s)	Result	Ref.
Baeksang Arts Awards	May 8, 2026	Best Director	Kim Do-young	Nominated	
Baeksang Arts Awards	May 8, 2026	Best Actor	Koo Kyo-hwan	Nominated	
Baeksang Arts Awards	May 8, 2026	Best Actress	Moon Ga-young	Won	
Buil Film Awards	October 7, 2026	Best Actor	Koo Kyo-hwan	Nominated	
Buil Film Awards	October 7, 2026	Best Actress	Moon Ga-young	Nominated	
Blue Dragon Film Awards	November 25, 2026	Best Actor	Koo Kyo-hwan	Pending	
Blue Dragon Film Awards	November 25, 2026	Best Actress	Moon Ga-young	Pending	
Blue Dragon Film Awards	November 25, 2026	Best Editing	Lee Gang-hee	Pending	
Blue Dragon Film Awards	November 25, 2026	Best Music	Kim Jang-woo	Pending	
