= Aema =

2025 South Korean television series

- Promotional poster
- Hangul: 애마
- RR: Aema
- MR: Aema
- Genre: Historical; Comedy drama
- Written by: Lee Hae-young
- Directed by: Lee Hae-young
- Starring: Lee Hanee; Bang Hyo-rin; Jin Seon-kyu; Cho Hyun-chul
- Country of origin: South Korea
- Original language: Korean
- No. of episodes: 6

Production
- Running time: 47–68 minutes
- Production companies: The Lamp Co., Ltd.; Studio Kik Co., Ltd.

Original release
- Network: Netflix
- Release: August 22, 2025

Aema (Korean: 애마) is a 2025 South Korean historical comedy drama television series written and directed by Lee Hae-young, and starring Lee Hanee, Bang Hyo-rin, Jin Seon-kyu, and Cho Hyun-chul. The series depicts Hui-ran and Joo-ae's struggles while making the sensational hit Madame Aema, which swept Korea in the early 1980s. It was released on Netflix in August 22, 2025.

== Synopsis ==
In the vibrant yet male-dominated world of 1980s Korean cinema located on Seoul's Chungmu-ro road, the sensational erotic film "Madame Aema" is set to make its mark, sparking both excitement and controversy. The story centers on two actresses with clashing personalities who are united by a shared struggle against the industry's exploitative nature.

== Cast and characters ==
=== Main ===
- Lee Hanee as Jung Hee-ran

A famous actress who is under contract of Shinsung Films who had enough of showing her body on screen. She is required to film an erotic film called "Madame Aema" in order to complete her contract with Shinsung Pictures. However since she no longer wants to bare her body, she is sidelined to supporting role meanwhile a new actress is cast to fulfill the main character position.

- Bang Hyo-rin as Shin Joo-ae

A rookie actress who was a nightclub dancer. She is cast as the main character "Aema" in a film called "Madame Aema". This makes her embroiled with conflict with Jeong Hee-ran, in which the latter initially behaves coldly toward her but actually wants to protect her dignity from the exploitative nature of the cinema industry.

- Jin Seon-kyu as Gu Jung-ho

Exploitative CEO of Shinsung Films, the production company for an erotic film called "Madame Aema". He is willing to do anything even having dirty deals with South Korean elites in order to be allowed to film Madame Aema by sending actresses under his production house to be used as prostitution to serve country's elites.

- Cho Hyun-chul as Kwak In-woo

An idealistic and hot blooded rookie director. He is forced by Gu Jung-ho to produce the erotic version of "Madame Aema" meanwhile he wants to produce the elegant and moderate version of "Madame Aema"

=== Supporting ===
- Woo Ji-hyun
- Lee Joo-young
- Kim Jong-soo
- Lee Sung-wook
- Ahn Gil-kang

== Episodes ==
No.	Title	Directed by	Written by	Original release date
1	"Episode 1"	Lee Hae-young	Lee Hae-young	August 22, 2025
2	"Episode 2"	Lee Hae-young	Lee Hae-young	August 22, 2025
3	"Episode 3"	Lee Hae-young	Lee Hae-young	August 22, 2025
4	"Episode 4"	Lee Hae-young	Lee Hae-young	August 22, 2025
5	"Episode 5"	Lee Hae-young	Lee Hae-young	August 22, 2025
6	"Episode 6"	Lee Hae-young	Lee Hae-young	August 22, 2025

== Production ==
=== Development ===
The series was officially commissioned by Netflix, with Lee Hae-young serving as writer and director, while The Lamp Co., Ltd. and Studio Kick Co., Ltd. co-managed the production.

=== Casting ===
In May 2023, it was reported that Lee Hanee would appear in the series. In September 2023, Jin Seon-kyu, Bang Hyo-rin and Cho Hyun-chul were reportedly cast to appear. Lee, Jin, Bang, and Cho were officially confirmed to star on the same month.

=== Filming ===
The principal photography of the series commenced in 2023 and concluded in 2024.

== Release ==
The series was exclusively released on Netflix on August 22, 2025.

== Reception ==
=== Critical response ===
On the review aggregator website Rotten Tomatoes, 86% of 7 critics' reviews are positive, with an average rating of 7.9/10.

=== Accolades ===
Award ceremony	Year	Category	Recipient(s)	Result	Ref.
Baeksang Arts Awards	2026	Best Supporting Actor	Jin Seon-kyu	Nominated	
Baeksang Arts Awards	2026	Best New Actress	Bang Hyo-rin	Won	
Director's Cut Awards	2026	Best Director (Drama)	Lee Hae-young	Nominated	
Director's Cut Awards	2026	Best Actress (Drama)	Lee Hanee	Nominated	
Director's Cut Awards	2026	Best New Actress (Drama)	Bang Hyo-rin	Won	
