= CHZZK =

Video streaming service

- Native name: 치지직
- Company type: Subsidiary
- Website type: Live streaming; Video on demand
- Available in: Korean
- Country of origin: South Korea
- Owner: Naver
- Website: chzzk.naver.com
- Commercial: Yes
- Launched: 19 December 2023; 2 years ago
- Current status: Active
- Native clients on: iOS, Android, Web

CHZZK (Korean: 치지직; RR: Chijijik) is a video streaming service by Naver, launched in April 2024. After Twitch announced the termination of business in South Korea, CHZZK started operation.

== Pre-launch information ==
Details emerged about the platform through broadcasts by internet broadcasters who had meetings with Naver, trademark information found by netizens in related internet communities, and press articles. As Twitch reduced the video quality to 720p and halted VOD playback in South Korea, causing concerns among streamers who were considering migrating to other websites after Twitch terminated its services, many Twitch streamers reportedly had meetings with Naver.

According to internet broadcasters who attended the meetings, ChijiJik's UI and system are said to be quite similar to Twitch's. Features supported by Twitch such as VOD playback and clips are included, with plans for up to 4K streaming in addition to 1080p. There is a rechargeable sponsorship system integrated with Naver Pay, with the unit being 'cheese'.

According to information technology industry sources on 8 December 2023, Twitch held a business meeting with Naver the previous day to discuss transferring its streamers to Naver's upcoming gaming streaming platform, "CHZZK", scheduled for release on the 19 December.

== Beta testing ==
From 5 to 8 December, internal testing was conducted through broadcasts of in-house League of Legends tournaments. Commentary was provided by Jung No-chul, Necklitt, and Kang Kwi.

On December 6, an official announcement for recruiting beta testers was posted.

The mobile app was renamed to 'CHZZK (치지직)' as the existing Naver gaming app incorporated streaming functionality.

== Features ==
- During beta testing, streaming used the H.264 codec with an 8000 kbit/s bitrate.
- Accounts banned by streamers cannot chat in the respective streamer's channel. Temporary bans last for 30 seconds and can be applied repeatedly. If the streamer chooses to permanently ban an follower, this follower is immediately unfollowed, and the follow button is disabled, preventing further following.
- The basic layout of the UI is similar to Twitch, making it easy for existing Twitch users to adapt.
- The mobile application offers a feature to zoom in on specific parts of the screen.
- The virtual items (including cheese) can be paid with Naver Pay or accumulated Naver Pay points.

== See also ==
- Naver
- Twitch
- List of social networking services
