= 62nd Baeksang Arts Awards =

2026 edition of award ceremony

- Official poster
- Date: May 8, 2026
- Site: COEX Hall D, Seoul
- Hosted by: Shin Dong-yup; Bae Suzy; Park Bo-gum
- Preshow hosts: You Jae-phil; Kim Ha-eun
- Organized by: HLL JoongAng
- Official website: www.baeksangawards.co.kr

Highlights
- Grand Prize: Film: Yoo Hae-jin (The King's Warden); Television: Ryu Seung-ryong (The Dream Life of Mr. Kim)
- Most awards: Film: The King's Warden (3); Broadcasting: Our Unwritten Seoul, The Dream Life of Mr. Kim, You and Everything Else (2 each)
- Most nominations: Film: No Other Choice, The King's Warden (7 each); Broadcasting: You and Everything Else (7)

Television coverage
- Network: JTBC

The 62nd Baeksang Arts Awards (Korean: 제62회 백상예술대상) ceremony was at COEX Hall D in Seoul on May 8, 2026. Organized by HLL JoongAng and sponsored by Gucci, the event recognizes excellence in South Korean film, television, and theater. This edition marks a significant expansion with the establishment of a Musical Division, created in partnership with the Korea Musical Theatre Association to celebrate the 60th anniversary of Korean musical theater.

The ceremony were hosted by Shin Dong-yup, Bae Suzy, and Park Bo-gum, marking their eighth year as a trio. Under the theme "The Stage", the event broadcast live on JTBC, JTBC2, and JTBC4. Nominees were selected from works released between April 2025 and March 2026, determined through a rigorous evaluation process that includes a preliminary survey of 30 industry experts per category.

== Ceremony information ==
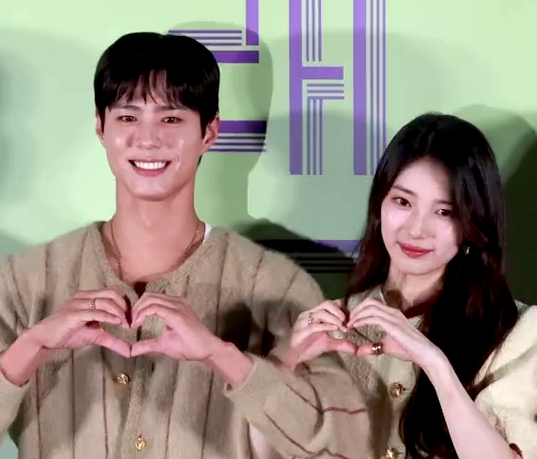
Park Bo-gum (L) and Bae Suzy (R) return as hosts with Shin Dong-yup (not pictured)

The ceremony is scheduled to begin on May 8, 2026, at 19:50 (KST) in COEX Hall D, Gangnam District, Seoul. The 62nd edition's theme, "The Stage", is designed to symbolize the convergence of television, film, and theater, emphasizing the awards' role as a comprehensive arts accolade. Italian luxury brand Gucci returns as the title sponsor for the fourth consecutive year, presenting the Gucci Impact Award under the sub-theme "The Stage of Impact" to honor works with significant social messaging. Eligible works include those released or performed between April 1, 2025, and March 31, 2026. This covers terrestrial, cable, and OTT content, as well as domestic feature films and stage plays. For television series to be eligible, they must consist of at least four episodes or have aired at least one-third of their total run within the eligibility window. Nominees are determined through a preliminary survey of 30 industry experts per category before moving to a final judging panel.

A major structural change for the 62nd edition is the establishment of the Musical Division, formalized through a Memorandum of Understanding (MOU) between HLL JoongAng and the Korea Musical Theatre Association. The launch coincides with the 60th anniversary of Korean musical theater, which traces its origins to the 1966 production Sweet, Come to Me Stealthily. The new division introduces three categories: Best Musical, the Creative Award (recognizing writers, composers, and designers), and a gender-neutral Performance Award.

Shin Dong-yup, Bae Suzy, and Park Bo-gum return as the primary hosts, marking their eighth year as a trio. This edition represents a milestone for the individual emcees: Shin marks his 12th time hosting overall and his 9th consecutive year, while Bae celebrates her 11th consecutive year in the role since joining in 2016. Park returns for his 8th appearance and his 5th consecutive ceremony following his military discharge.

== Winners and nominees ==
Winners are listed first and highlighted in boldface. Nominees are listed per official website.

=== Film ===
Film category
**Grand Prize**
**Yoo Hae-jin (actor) – The King's Warden**
**Best Film**	**Best Director**
**No Other Choice**; The Final Semester; Good News; The World of Love; The King's Warden	**Yoon Ga-eun – The World of Love**; Kim Do-young – Once We Were Us; Park Chan-wook – No Other Choice; Byun Sung-hyun – Good News; Jang Hang-jun – The King's Warden
**Best New Director**	**Best Screenplay**
**Park Joon-ho – 3670**; Kwon Yong-jae – The Price of Goodbye; Kim Soo-jin – Noise; Kim Yong-hwan – Your Letter; Jang Byung-ki – When This Summer Is Over	**Byun Sung-hyun and Lee Jin-seong – Good News**; Park Joon-ho – 3670; Yeon Sang-ho – The Ugly; Yoon Ga-eun – The World of Love; Lim Na-moo – People and Meat
**Best Actor**	**Best Actress**
**Park Jeong-min – The Ugly as Lim Dong-hwan / young Im Young-gyu**; Koo Kyo-hwan – Once We Were Us as Lee Eun-ho; Yoo Hae-jin – The King's Warden as Eom Heung-do; Lee Byung-hun – No Other Choice as Yoo Man-su; Hong Kyung – Good News as Seo Go-myung	**Moon Ga-young – Once We Were Us as Han Jeong-won**; Go Ah-sung – Pavane as Mi-jung; Son Ye-jin – No Other Choice as Lee Mi-ri; Lee Hye-young – The Old Woman with the Knife as Hornclaw / Godmother / Nails; Han Ye-ri – Spring Night as Yeong-gyeong
**Best Supporting Actor**	**Best Supporting Actress**
**Lee Sung-min – No Other Choice as Goo Beom-mo**; Ryoo Seung-bum – Good News as Park Sang-hyeon; Park Hae-joon – Humint as Hwang Chi-seong; Yoo Ji-tae – The King's Warden as Han Myŏnghoe; Jang Yong – People and Meat as U-sik	**Shin Se-kyung – Humint as Chae Seon-hwa**; Shin Hyun-been – The Ugly as Jung Young-hee; Yeom Hye-ran – No Other Choice as Lee A-ra; Jang Hye-jin – The World of Love as Kang Tae-sun; Jeon Mi-do – The King's Warden as Mae-hwa
**Best New Actor**	**Best New Actress**
**Park Ji-hoon – The King's Warden as Prince Nosan / King Danjong of Joseon (Yi Hong-wi)**; Moon Sang-min – Pavane as Kyung-rok; Ahn Hyo-seop – Omniscient Reader: The Prophecy as Kim Dok-ja; Yoo Lee-ha – The Final Semester as Chang-woo; Cho Yoo-hyun – 3670 as Cheol-jun	**Seo Su-bin – The World of Love as Ju-in**; Shin Si-ah – Even If This Love Disappears From the World Tonight as Han Seo-yoon; Shin Eun-soo – Love Untangled as Park Se-ri; Chae Won-bin – Yadang: The Snitch as Uhm Soo-jin; Choi Yu-ri – My Daughter Is a Zombie as Lee Soo-a
**Best Technical Achievement**	**Gucci Impact Award**
**Minhwi Lee (Music) – Pavane**; Kim Sang-bum and Kim Ho-bin (Editing) – Good News; Kim Woo-hyung (Cinematography) – No Other Choice; Lee Mok-won (Art Direction) – The Ugly; Jung Sung-jin and Kim Woo-chul (VFX) – Omniscient Reader: The Prophecy	**The King's Warden**; The Final Semester; People and Meat; The World of Love; Pavane

==== Films with multiple nominations ====
The following films received multiple nominations:

Nominations	Films
7	No Other Choice
7	The King's Warden
6	Good News
6	The World of Love
4	Pavane
4	The Ugly
3	Once We Were Us
3	People and Meat
3	3670
2	Humint
2	Omniscient Reader: The Prophecy

==== Films with multiple awards ====
The following films received multiple awards:

Wins	Films
3	The King's Warden
2	No Other Choice
2	The World of Love

=== Broadcasting ===
Television category
**Grand Prize**
**Ryu Seung-ryong (actor) – The Dream Life of Mr. Kim**
**Best Drama**	**Best Entertainment Program**
**You and Everything Else (Netflix)**; Our Unwritten Seoul (tvN); The Dream Life of Mr. Kim (JTBC); Low Life (Disney+); Bon Appétit, Your Majesty (tvN)	**The Wonder Coach (MBC)**; Extreme84 (MBC); The Ballad of Us (SBS); The White Collars – Season 2 (Coupang Play); Culinary Class Wars – Season 2 (Netflix)
**Best Educational Show**	**Best Director**
**Our Shining Days (KBS1)**; The Echoes of Survivors: Inside Korea's Tragedies (Netflix); The Talent War (KBS1); The Holy Elements (KBS1); The Strange Vet in the Strange Zoo (SBS)	**Park Shin-woo – Our Unwritten Seoul**; Woo Min-ho – Made in Korea; Yoo Young-eun – Can This Love Be Translated?; Jo Young-min – You and Everything Else; Cho Hyun-tak – The Dream Life of Mr. Kim
**Best Actor**	**Best Actress**
**Hyun Bin – Made in Korea as Baek Ki-tae**; Ryu Seung-ryong – The Dream Life of Mr. Kim as Kim Nak-soo; Park Jin-young – Our Unwritten Seoul as Lee Ho-soo; Lee Jun-ho – Typhoon Family as Kang Tae-poong; Ji Sung – The Judge Returns as Lee Han-young	**Park Bo-young – Our Unwritten Seoul as Yoo Mi-ji / Yoo Mi-rae**; Kim Go-eun – You and Everything Else as Yoo Eun-jung; Park Ji-hyun – You and Everything Else as Cheon Sang-yeon; Shin Hye-sun – The Art of Sarah as Sarah Kim / Mok Ga-hui / Du-a / Kim Eun-jae; Lim Yoona – Bon Appétit, Your Majesty as Yeon Ji-yeong
**Best Supporting Actor**	**Best Supporting Actress**
**Yoo Seung-mok – The Dream Life of Mr. Kim as Baek Jeong-tae**; Kim Gun-woo – You and Everything Else as Kim Sang-hak; Yoo Jae-myung – Love Me as Seo Jin-ho; Jang Seung-jo – As You Stood By as Noh Jin-pyo / Jang Kang; Jin Seon-kyu – Aema as Gu Jung-ho	**Im Soo-jung – Low Life as Yang Jung-sook**; Myung Se-bin – The Dream Life of Mr. Kim as Park Ha-jin; Won Mi-kyung – Our Unwritten Seoul as Kim Ro-sa / Hyeon Sang-wol; Lee E-dam – The Art of Sarah as Kim Mi-jeong; Ha Yoon-kyung – Undercover Miss Hong as Go Bok-hee
**Best New Actor**	**Best New Actress**
**Lee Chae-min – Bon Appétit, Your Majesty as Lee Heon**; Kim Jin-wook – Low Life as Lee Bok-geun; Bae Na-ra – Weak Hero Class 2 as Na Baek-jin; Jung Joon-won – Resident Playbook as Ku Do-won; Hong Min-gi – To My Beloved Thief as Im Jae-yi	**Bang Hyo-rin – Aema as Shin Joo-ae**; Kim Min – Low Life as Park Seon-ja; Shin Si-ah – Resident Playbook as Pyo Nam-kyung; Jeon So-young – Honour as Han Min-seo; Choi Ji-soo – Undercover Miss Hong as Kang Nora / Kang Eun-joo
**Best Male Variety Performer**	**Best Female Variety Performer**
**Kian84**; Kwak Beom; Kim Won-hun; Lee Seo-jin; Choo Sung-hoon	**Lee Soo-ji**; Kim Yeon-koung; Seol In-ah; Jang Do-yeon; Hong Jin-kyung
**Best Screenplay**	**Best Technical Achievement**
**Song Hye-jin – You and Everything Else**; Kwon Jong-gwan – The Price of Confession; Lee Kang – Our Unwritten Seoul; Lee Sun – To My Beloved Thief; Chu Song-yeon – The Art of Sarah	**Kang Seung-won (Music) – The Seasons**; Kim Nam-sik (VFX) – Low Life; Kim Tae-sung (Cinematography) – Made in Korea; Eom Seong-tak (Cinematography) – You and Everything Else; Yoon Jin-hee (Art Direction) – Crime Scene Zero

==== Broadcasting programs with multiple nominations ====
The following broadcasting programs received multiple nominations:

Nominations	Broadcasting programs
7	You and Everything Else
6	Our Unwritten Seoul
5	Low Life
5	The Dream Life of Mr. Kim
3	Bon Appétit, Your Majesty
3	Made in Korea
3	The Art of Sarah
2	Resident Playbook
2	To My Beloved Thief
2	Undercover Miss Hong

==== Broadcasting programs with multiple awards ====
The following broadcasting programs received multiple awards:

Wins	Broadcasting programs
2	Our Unwritten Seoul
2	The Dream Life of Mr. Kim
2	You and Everything Else

=== Theater ===
Theater category
**Baeksang Theater**
**Jellyfish**; Last Interview; A Mirror; Sammaekyung; End Wall
**Young Theater**	**Best Acting**
**Tank of Fire (Theater) – Chang So**; Kim Yeon-min (Director) – Zoom In: Chekhov; Munjibang (Theater) – Haboob; Lee Kyeong-heon (Playwright) – Ex Libris; The Creative Company LAS (Theater) – Function Domino	**Kim Shin-rok – Prima Facie**; Kwon Jung-hoon – Tulip; Kim Si-yu – You Don't Know Your Son; Jeon Hye-jin – Anthropolis II – Laios; Ji Choon-sung – Sammaekyung

=== Musical ===
Theater category
**Best Musical**
**Arang**; The Longest Nights; Laika; Red Hare; Jeokto; Man in Hanbok
**Creative Achievement**	**Best Performer**
**Seo Byung-goo (Choreography) – Evita**; Oh Lupina (Direction) – Mad Hatter; Oh Sang-jun (Original Score) – Arang; Lee Sun-young (Original Score) – Laika; Han A-reum (Playwriting) – Red Hare; Jeokto	**Kim Junsu – Beetlejuice**; Min Kyoung-ah – Red Book; Park Eun-tae – Man in Hanbok; Yu Ri-a – Evita; Hong Kwang-ho – Moulin Rouge!

=== Special awards ===
The voting for the Naver Popularity Award was held from April 24, at 12:00 (KST) to May 5, at 23:59 (KST) via Naver.

Awards	Recipient
**Naver Popularity Award – Male**	**Park Ji-hoon**
**Naver Popularity Award – Female**	**Lim Yoona**

== Presenters and performers ==
The following individuals and teams, listed in order of appearance, presented awards or performed musical numbers.

Presenters
Name(s)	Role
Choo Young-woo; Chae Won-bin	Presented the awards for Baeksang Arts Award for Best New Actor – Television, Baeksang Arts Award for Best New Actress – Television, and Young Theater
Jung Sung-il; Roh Yoon-seo	Presented the awards for Baeksang Arts Award for Best New Actor – Film, Baeksang Arts Award for Best New Actress – Film, and Baeksang Arts Award for Best New Director – Film
Byun Yo-han; Roh Jae-wonw	Presented the awards for Best Techinal Achievement – Television, Best Technical Achievement – Film, Baeksang Arts Award for Best Screenplay – Film, and Baeksang Arts Award for Best Screenplay – Television
Yim Si-wan; Seol In-ah	Presented the awards for Baeksang Arts Award for Most Popular Actress and Baeksang Arts Award for Most Popular Actor
Kwak Ji-sook	Presented the award for Best Acting – Theater
Yoo Jun-sang; Cha Ji-hyun	Presented the awards for Creative Achievement – Musical and Best Performer – Musical
Yoo Jae-myung; Claudia Kim	Presented the awards for Baeksang Arts Award for Best Supporting Actress – Film and Baeksang Arts Award for Best Supporting Actor – Film
Choi Dae-hoon; Yeom Hye-ran	Presented the awards for Baeksang Arts Award for Best Supporting Actor – Television and Baeksang Arts Award for Best Supporting Actress – Television
Shin Dong-yup; Lee Soo-ji	Presented the awards for Baeksang Arts Award for Best Male Variety Performer and Baeksang Arts Award for Best Female Variety Performer
Hwang Min-hyun; Kim So-hyun	Presented the awards for Baeksang Arts Award for Best Educational Show and Baeksang Arts Award for Best Entertainment Program
Ji Chang-wook	Presented the awards for Baeksang Arts Award for Best Director – Film and Baeksang Arts Award for Best Director – Television
Park Ri-woong; Kim Shin-rok	Presented the award for Gucci Impact Award
Song Seung-hwan; Choi Jung-won	Presented the award for Best Musical
Lee Hee-joon	Presented the award for Baeksang Theater
Song Kang; Park Eun-bin	Presented the awards for Baeksang Arts Award for Best Film and Baeksang Arts Award for Best Drama
Ju Ji-hoon; Kim Tae-ri	Presented the awards for Baeksang Arts Award for Best Actor – Television and Baeksang Arts Award for Best Actress – Television
Jo Jung-suk; Jeon Do-yeon	Presented the awards for Baeksang Arts Award for Best Actor – Film and Baeksang Arts Award for Best Actress – Film
Hong Kyung-pyo	Presented the award for Baeksang Arts Award Grand Prize – Film
Jeongdo Hong; Yoon Hyun-jun	Presented the awards for Baeksang Arts Award Grand Prize – Television

Performers
Name(s)	Role	Performance
Choi Kang-rok	Performer	"Nanta"
Heart2Heart	Performer	"Bus Stop"
Lee Byung-woo	Performer	"Our" + "All for Love"
Yoo Yeon-seok		"Our" + "All for Love"
