= Yoon Ga-eun =

South Korean filmmaker (born 1982)

- Yoon in 2026
- Born: February 15, 1982 (age 44); Seoul, South Korea
- Education: Sogang University - History Department; Korea National University of Arts Graduate School of Film, TV & Multimedia
- Occupations: Film director; screenwriter

Korean name
- Hangul: 윤가은
- Hanja: 尹佳恩
- RR: Yun Gaeun
- MR: Yun Kaŭn

Yoon Ga-eun (born February 15, 1982) is a South Korean film director and screenwriter. Her feature-length directorial debut, The World of Us, premiered at the 66th Berlin International Film Festival in 2016, won the Blue Dragon Film Award for Best New Director, and received numerous international accolades. Her third feature film, The World of Love, had its world premiere at the 50th Toronto International Film Festival, marking the first time a South Korean film was selected for the Platform competition. It subsequently won the Roberto Rossellini Jury Award and the People's Choice Award at the 9th Pingyao International Film Festival, where it held its Asian premiere.

== Education ==
Yoon graduated from the History Department at Sogang University and pursued her graduate studies at the School of Film, TV and Multimedia within the Korea National University of Arts.

== Career ==
=== Beginning with short films ===
Yoon directed her first short film, the 19-minute The Taste of Salvia, in 2009. She followed this with several short projects, including Proof (2010). Her first major breakthrough came with Guest (2011), a sensitive portrayal of the emotional growing pains experienced by a pubescent girl. The film won the Grand Prix at the 34th Clermont-Ferrand International Short Film Festival in 2012.

Her 2013 short film Sprout chronicles the solo adventure of a young girl left on her own for the first time. Yoon designed the narrative around the protagonist's small discoveries, reflecting her own artistic philosophy that the true value of human endeavor lies in the process of striving rather than guaranteed success. Sprout went on to win the Crystal Bear for Best Short Film in the Generation Kplus section at the 64th Berlin International Film Festival.

=== Feature films ===
In 2016, Yoon Ga-eun returned to the 66th Berlin International Film Festival with her feature-length directorial debut, The World of Us, which screened in the Generation Kplus section. The film follows Sun (Choi Soo-in), a ten-year-old outcast who tries her utmost to make friends at school, only to be manipulated by a classmate named Bora (Lee Seo-yeon). Along with newcomer Ji-ah, the girls navigate a fragile dynamic of forming friendships, falling apart, and making up as part of the painful process of growing up. Yoon won a Blue Dragon Film Award for Best New Director among other accolades.

Yoon released her second feature film, The House of Us, in South Korea on August 22, 2019. It follows Hana (Kim Na-yeon), who wins a "best classmate" prize, only for her mother to dismiss her achievement. While grocery shopping, Hana meets Yoo-jin (Joo Ye-rim), a young girl searching for her sister Yoo-mi (Kim Si-a). After reuniting the sisters, Hana forms a close bond with them, stepping into an older-sister role. For the film, Yoon won Best New Director at the Hong Kong Asian Film Festival.

Yoon's third feature film, The World of Love, had its world premiere at the 50th Toronto International Film Festival as the first Korean film in the Platform competition. It received the Roberto Rossellini Jury Award and the People’s Choice Award at its Asian premiere during the 9th Pingyao International Film Festival.

== Artistry ==
Yoon's body of work centers predominantly on the inner emotional worlds of children and adolescents. She is also recognized for her ability to discover and mentor new talent. Actress Jung Yeon-ju launched her career in Guest (2011), and child actor Kim Su-an was discovered and cast by Yoon in her short Sprout, before earning international recognition as the youngest Korean actor invited to the Cannes Film Festival.

== Filmography ==
Films credits of Yoon
Year	Title	Credited as		Notes	Ref.
Year	Title	Film director	Screenwriter	Notes	Ref.
2009	The Taste of Salvia	Yes	Yes	Short	
2010	Proof	Yes	Yes	Short	
2011	Guest	Yes	Yes	Short	
2013	Sprout	Yes	Yes	Short	
2013	Congratulations, Korean Cinema	Yes	Yes	Short as part of omnibus film 100x100	
2013	Tabloid Truth	No	No	Credited as scripter	
2016	The World of Us	Yes	Yes	Directorial debut in feature film	
2019	The House of Us	Yes	Yes		
2025	The World of Love	Yes	Yes		

== Accolades ==
=== International festival ===
- 2016 Berlin International Film Festival – Generation (The World of Us)
- 2016 TIFF Kids International Film Festival – TIFF Kids (The World of Us)
- 2016 Udine Far East Film Festival – Competition Section – South Korea (The World of Us)
- 2016 Toronto Korean Film Festival – Opening Night Feature Presentation (The World of Us)
- 2016 Busan International Film Festival – Korean Cinema Today-Panorama (The World of Us)

=== Ambassadorship ===
- 2023 — Unobstructed Film Ambassador

=== Jury member ===
- 2022 – Jury member, Sonje Award at 27th Busan International Film Festival

=== Awards and nominations ===
Award ceremony	Year	Category	Recipient(s)	Result	Ref.
Ale Kino! International Young Audience Film Festival	2016	Golden Goat for Best Feature Film for Children	The World of Us	Won	
Asia Pacific Screen Awards	2016	Best Youth Feature Film	The World of Us	Won	
Asia Pacific Screen Awards	2025	Best Youth Film	The World of Us	Nominated	
Aspen Shortsfest	2014	International Competition	Sprout	Won	
Baeksang Arts Awards	2017	Best New Director	Yoon Ga-eun	Nominated	
Baeksang Arts Awards	2017	Best Screenplay	Yoon Ga-eun	Won	
Baeksang Arts Awards	2026	Best Film	The World of Love	Nominated	
Baeksang Arts Awards	2026	Gucci Impact Award	The World of Love	Nominated	
Baeksang Arts Awards	2026	Best Director	Yoon Ga-eun	Won	
Baeksang Arts Awards	2026	Best Screenplay	Yoon Ga-eun	Nominated	
Bechdel Day	2026	Bechdelian in Film — Director of the Year	Yoon Ga-eun	Won	
Berlin International Film Festival	2014	Generation – Crystal Bear for the Best Short Film	Sprout	Won	
BFI London Film Festival	2025	Best Film	The World of Love	Nominated	
Blue Dragon Film Awards	2016	Best New Director	Yoon Ga-eun	Won	
Blue Dragon Film Awards	2026	Best Film	The World of Love	Pending	
Blue Dragon Film Awards	2026	Best Director	Yoon Ga-eun	Pending	
Blue Dragon Film Awards	2026	Best Screenplay	Yoon Ga-eun	Pending	
Buil Film Awards	2016	Best New Director	Yoon Ga-eun	Won	
Buil Film Awards	2016	Best Screenplay	Yoon Ga-eun	Nominated	
Busan International Film Festival	2013	Wide Angle: Korean Short Film Competition – Sonje Award Special	Sprout	Won	
Busan International Short Film Festival	2014	Short film	Sprout	Won	
Chunsa Film Art Awards	2020	Best Screenplay	Yoon Ga-eun	Nominated	
Chunsa Film Art Awards	2025	Best Director	Yoon Ga-eun	Won	
Clermont-Ferrand International Short Film Festival	2012	International Competition	Guest	Won	
Director's Cut Awards	2019	Best Independent Film Director	Yoon Ga-eun	Nominated	
Director's Cut Awards	2026	Best Director (Film)	Yoon Ga-eun	Nominated	
Director's Cut Awards	2026	Best Screenplay (Film)	Yoon Ga-eun	Won	
Director's Cut Awards	2026	Best Vision (Film)	Yoon Ga-eun	Won	
Flickerfest International Short Film Festival	2013	Competition Section	Guest	Won	
Great Short Film Festival	2011	Great Director Award	Yoon Ga-eun	Won	
Hong Kong Asian Film Festival	2019	Best New Director	The House of Us	Won	
Korea Assembly Grand Awards	2016	Outstanding Film	The World of Us	Won	
Korean Association of Film Critics Awards	2016	Top Films of the Year	The World of Us	Won	
Korean Association of Film Critics Awards	2016	Best New Director	Yoon Ga-eun — The World of Us	Won	
KOFRA Film Awards	2016	Best Independent Film	The World of Us	Won	
Korean Film Producers Association Awards	2025	Best Film	The World of Love	Won	
Pingyao International Film Festival	2025	Roberto Rossellini Award: Jury Award	The World of Love	Won	
Pingyao International Film Festival	2025	Audience Award	The World of Love	Won	
Prague Short Film Festival	2013	Panorama	Guest	Won	
National Assembly of Korea Awards	2016	Film (Arts) Category	The World of Us	Won	
Seoul International Youth Film Festival	2011	SIYFF Vision Award	Guest	Won	
SEOUL International Women's Film Festival	2014	Asian Short Film & Video Competition	Sprout	Won	
Three Continents Festival	2025	Golden Montgolfière	The World of Love	Won	
Tokyo Filmex	2016	Audience Award	The World of Us	Won	
Tokyo Filmex	2016	Jury Special Mention	Yoon Ga-eun	Won	
Toronto International Film Festival	2025	People's Choice Award	The World of Love	Nominated	
Toronto International Film Festival	2025	Platform Prize	The World of Love	Nominated	
Warsaw Film Festival	2025	Warsaw Grand Prix	The World of Love	Nominated	
Wildflower Film Awards	2016	Grand Prize	The World of Us	Won	
Wildflower Film Awards	2016	Best Director – Narrative Films	Yoon Ga-eun	Nominated	
Wildflower Film Awards	2016	Best New Director – Narrative Films	Yoon Ga-eun	Nominated	
Wildflower Film Awards	2016	Best Screenplay	Yoon Ga-eun	Nominated	
Wildflower Film Awards	2026	Best Screenplay	Yoon Ga-eun	Won	
Women in Film Korea Festival	2016	Best Director	Yoon Ga-eun	Won	
Zlín Film Festival	2016	Best Feature Film for Children	The World of Us	Won	
