= Bechdel Day =

Annual awards ceremony

- Previous: Bechdel Day 2025; Pending: Bechdel Day 2026
- Native name: 벡델데이
- Description: Honors for outstanding creators and works contributing to gender equality in South Korean cinema and television
- Sponsored by: Ministry of Culture, Sports and Tourism; Korean Film Council
- Country: South Korea
- Established: 2020
- Currently held by: Directors Guild of Korea (DGK)
- Most wins: Jung Ji-in; Lee Hanee

Bechdel Day (Korean: 벡델데이) is an annual South Korean awards ceremony and event hosted by the Directors Guild of Korea (DGK) and supported by the Ministry of Culture, Sports and Tourism and the Korean Film Council. Established in 2020, the event evaluates and honors gender equality in South Korean film and television, utilizing the Bechdel test alongside expanded criteria.

== History ==
In 2020, Gender Equality Week moved from July to the first week of September to commemorate the anniversary of "Yeoyeotongmun," Korea's first declaration of women's rights on September 1. That same year, the Directors Guild of Korea (DGK) launched Bechdel Day, an event inspired by American cartoonist Alison Bechdel's the gender Bechdel test.

The event annually honors standout creators, including directors, writers, actors, and producers, who contributed to these works as "Bechdelians." It also selects ten works with high gender equality standards as the "Bechdel Choice 10." In 2022, the scope expanded to include television series under the category "Bechdel Choice 5," before expanding to a full selection of ten series in 2023.

== Criteria ==
The initiative evaluates media using the "Bechdel Test 7," which builds upon the traditional Bechdel test by incorporating four additional criteria, as follows:

- There are at least two named female characters.
- The female characters have a conversation with each other.
- Their conversation is not solely about male characters.
- At least one key crew member (director, producer, screenwriter, or cinematographer) is a woman.
- The work features a solo female protagonist, or balances the roles and importance of male and female leads equally.
- The content is free from hatred or discriminatory views toward minorities.
- Female characters are portrayed without relying on stereotypes.

== Bechdel day events ==
Bechdel day events
Edition	Date	Venue	Programmer	Ref.
1st	September 1–7, 2020	Online		
2nd	September 4, 2021	Online	Yoon Dan-bi, Im Sun-ae	
3rd	September 6–7, 2022	Chungmu Arts Center Small Theater Blue	Lee Hwa-jeong	
4th	September 6–7, 2023	Indie Space, Seoul	Lee Hwa-jeong	
5th	September 7, 2024	Indie Space, Seoul	Lee Hwa-jeong	
6th	September 6–7, 2025	KU Cinematheque, Arts & Culture Center, Konkuk University, Gwangjin-gu, Seoul	Lee Hwa-jeong	
7th	August 29–30, 2026	Yeonnamjang, Seoul	Yoon Dan-bi, Lim Dae-hyung	

== Bechdel Choice 10 ==
Edition	Year	Film	Series	Ref.
1st	2020	Kim Ji-young: Born 1982; Maggie; Innocent Witness; House of Hummingbird; Our Body; Baseball Girl; The House of Us; Moonlit Winter; Lucky Chan-sil; French Woman	—N/a	
2nd	2021	Aloners; I Don't Fire Myself; Moving On; The Day I Died: Unclosed Case; Diva; Light for the Youth; Samjin Company English Class; Whispering Corridors 6: The Humming; The Call; Black Light	—N/a	
3rd	2022	Gull; Gyeong-ah's Daughter; Ten Months; Anchor; Nothing Serious; Hommage; Missing Yoon; Perhaps Love; Snowball; Decision to Leave	Inspector Koo; Thirty-Nine; Work Later, Drink Now; The Red Sleeve; Political Fever	
4th	2023	The Apartment with Two Women; Kill Boksoon; Next Sohee; Dream Palace; Min-young's Report Card; Soulmate; Alienoid; Phantom; Honest Candidate 2; You and I	Glitch; The Glory; Lies Hidden in My Garden; One Day Off; The Interest of Love; Under the Queen's Umbrella; My Perfect Stranger; Extraordinary Attorney Woo; Little Women; Queenmaker	
5th	2024	A Letter from Kyoto; You and Me; Water Scale; Smugglers; Hill of Secrets; Picnic; Citizen of a Kind; Sleep; Jeong-sun; Long Live Hell	Not Others; Castaway Diva; Knight Flower; Tell Me That You Love Me; Daily Dose of Sunshine; A Shop for Killers; The Midnight Romance in Hagwon; Pyramid Game; Strong Girl Nam-soon; LTNS	
6th	2025	Dark Nuns; Blesser; Concerning My Daughter; Lucky, Apartment; Revolver; Victory; My Best, Your Least; The Old Woman with the Knife; High-Five; Because I Hate Korea	Good Partner; Miss Night and Day; A Virtuous Business; Unknown Seoul; Friendly Rivalry; The Tale of Lady Ok; When Life Gives You Tangerines; Hyper Knife; Jeongnyeon: The Star Is Born; Doubt	
7th	2026	Teaching Practice: Idiot Girls and School Ghost 2; Merely Known as Something Else; Home Behind Bars; Once We Were Us; Mad Dance Office; The World of Love; Between the two of us; The Woman in the White Car; Hallan; Red Nails	Don't Call Me Ma'am; As You Stood By; The Art of Sarah; We Are All Trying Here; Honour; The Price of Confession; You and Everything Else; Yumi's Cells; Undercover Miss Hong; Aema	

== Bechdelian ==
=== Bechdelian in film — Director of the Year ===
Bechdelian in film — Director of the Year
Edition	Year	Winner(s)	Film(s)	Ref.
1st	2020	Kim Bora	House of Hummingbird	
2nd	2021	Hong Seong-eun	Aloners	
3rd	2022	Shin Su-won	Hommage	
4th	2023	July Jung	Next Sohee	
5th	2024	Lee Ji-eun	Hill of Secrets	
6th	2025	Lee Mi-rang	About Her	
7th	2026	Yoon Ga-eun	The World of Love	

=== Bechdelian in film — Producer of the Year ===
Bechdelian in film — Producer of the Year
Edition	Year	Winner(s)	Film(s)	Ref.
1st	2020	Kim Ji-hye	The House of Us	
2nd	2021	Hong Seong-eun	Aloners	
3rd	2022	Park Eun-kyung	Samjin Company English Class	
4th	2023	Shin Hye-yeon, Kim Sung-hwan	The Anchor	
5th	2024	Kang Hye-jung	Smugglers	
6th	2025	Lee An-na	Victory, High-Five	
7th	2026	Ha Myung-mi	Hallan	

=== Bechdelian in film — Writers of the Year ===
Bechdelian in film — Writers of the Year
Edition	Year	Winner(s)	Film(s)	Ref.
1st	2020	Lee Bo-ram, Kim Yoon-seok	Innocent Witness	
2nd	2021	Park Ji-wan	The Day I Died: Unclosed Case	
3rd	2022	Chung Seo-kyung, Park Chan-wook	Decision to Leave	
4th	2023	Kim Se-in	The Apartment with Two Women	
5th	2024	Kim Min-ju	A Letter from Kyoto	
6th	2025	Kim Soo-yeon	Minimal Goodness	
7th	2026	Seo Ja-yeon	The Woman in the White Car	

=== Bechdelian in film — Actresses of the Year ===
Bechdelian in film — Actresses of the Year
Edition	Year	Winner(s)	Film(s)	Ref.
1st	2020	Kim Hee-ae	Moonlit Winter	
2nd	2021	Yeom Hye-ran	Black Light	
3rd	2022	Ha Yoon-kyung	Gyeong-a's Daughter	
4th	2023	Lee Ha-nee	Phantom	
5th	2024	Ra Mi-ran	Citizen of a Kind	
6th	2025	Lee Hye-young	The Old Woman with the Knife	
7th	2026	Jang Sun, Byun Jung-hee	Red Nails	

=== Bechdelian in series — Directors of the Year ===
Bechdelian in series — Directors of the Year
Edition	Year	Winner(s)	Film(s)	Ref.
3rd	2022	Jung Ji-in	The Red Sleeve	
4th	2023	Lee Jong-pil	One Day Off	
5th	2024	Jeon Go-woon, Lim Dae-hyung	LTNS	
6th	2025	Jung Ji-in	Jeongnyeon: The Star is Born	
7th	2026	Lee Hae-young	Aema	

=== Bechdelian in series — Producers of the Year ===
Bechdelian in series — Producers of the Year
Edition	Year	Winner(s)	Series(s)	Ref.
3rd	2022	Park Sung-hye	Inspector Koo	
4th	2023	Cho Moon-joo	Little Women	
5th	2024	Baek Mi-kyung	Strong Girl Nam-soon	
6th	2025	Han Seok-won; Hwang Ki-yong; Shin Hye-mi	A Virtuous Business	
7th	2026	Choi Han-gyul; Park Jin-hyung; Son Jae-sung	Honor	

=== Bechdelian in series — Writers of the Year ===
Bechdelian in series — Writers of the Year
Edition	Year	Winner(s)	Series(s)	Ref.
3rd	2022	Yoo Young-ah	Thirty, Nine	
4th	2023	Park Ba-ra	Under the Queen's Umbrella	
5th	2024	Park Kyung-hwa	The Midnight Romance in Hagwon	
6th	2025	Park Ji-sook	The Tale of Lady Ok	
7th	2026	Song Hye-jin	You and Everything Else	

=== Bechdelian in series — Actresses of the Year ===
Bechdelian in series — Actresses of the Year
Edition	Year	Winner(s)	Film(s)	Ref.
3rd	2022	Lee Young-ae	Inspector Koo	
4th	2023	Lim Ji-yeon	The Glory, Lies Hidden in My Garden	
5th	2024	Lee Ha-nee	Knight Flower	
6th	2025	Park Bo-young	Unknown Seoul	
7th	2026	Kim Go-eun	You and Everything Else	
