= Bechdel Day 2025 =

Annual awards ceremony

Bechdel Day
- Native name: 벡델데이 2025
- Sponsored by: Ministry of Culture, Sports and Tourism; Korean Film Council
- Date: September 6–7, 2025
- Venue: KU Cinematheque, Seoul
- Country: South Korea
- Currently held by: Directors Guild of Korea (DGK)

Bechdel Day 2025 (Korean: 벡델데이 2025) was held on September 6–7, 2025 at the KU Cinematheque in Gwangjin-gu, Seoul. It marked the sixth edition of Bechdel Day, an annual South Korean awards ceremony and event hosted by the Directors Guild of Korea (DGK) and by the Ministry of Culture, Sports and Tourism and the Korean Film Council. Established in 2020, the event evaluates and honors gender equality in South Korean film and television, utilizing the Bechdel test alongside expanded criteria.

== Program ==
The event featured special talks, screenings, and Q&A sessions.

=== Meeting with Bechdelians ===
On Saturday, September 6, the "Meeting with Bechdelians" session featured selected honorees, including director Lee Mi-rang, producer Lee Anna, writer Kim Su-yeon, director Jung Ji-in, and producer Shin Hye-mi. They discussed female characters who secure their own stakes in genres and narratives, as well as gender equality within storytelling. That same day, a screening of The Fruit of the Abysswas followed by a talk titled "One and Only! Actress Lee Hye-young: Expanding the Boundaries of Female Actors," featuring director Min Kyu-dong and actress Lee Hye-young, who discussed the film and the actress's career achievements. A special screening of About My Daughter was also held that evening.

=== Special screening ===
On Sunday, September 7, a screening of Victory, selected for Bechdel Choice 10, was followed by a Q&A session with director Park Beom-su and actress Park Se-wan, moderated by director Jung Ga-young. Additionally, a special screening of Minimal Goodness took place that evening.

=== Bechdel Talk: Freedom of the Body: Awakening the Suppressed Desires and Challenges of Women ===
Another session addressed gender equality in popular television variety programs such as Street Woman Fighter, The Crazy Girls, and Iron Girls. Producer Kwon Hyung-gu and actress Lee Young-jin of SBS's The Crazy Girls, alongside producer Jung Kyung-wook of Mnet's Street Woman Fighter, discussed gender equality and competitive spirit in media under the theme "Freedom of the Body: Awakening the Suppressed Desires and Challenges of Women."

== Winners ==
=== Judging ===
On August 5, 2025, the DGK announced the "Bechdel Choice 10" film selections, choosing 10 films out of 125 released in theaters or as OTT originals between June of the previous year and May of the current year. The film section jury included film producer Koo Jung-ah (CEO of But Media), director Min Yong-geun, Cineplay reporter Sung Chan-eul, and Bechdel Day programmer Lee Hwa-jeong.

On August 12, 2025, the DGK announced the "Bechdel Choice 10" series selections. This category reviewed 102 television and OTT titles released across broadcast, general programming, cable, and streaming platforms from June 2024 to May 2025. The series category judges included TV columnist Kim Gyo-seok, Professor Kim Min-jeong of the Department of Creative Writing at Chung-Ang University, Cineplay reporter Kim Ji-yeon, and Bechdel Day programmer Lee Hwa-jeong.

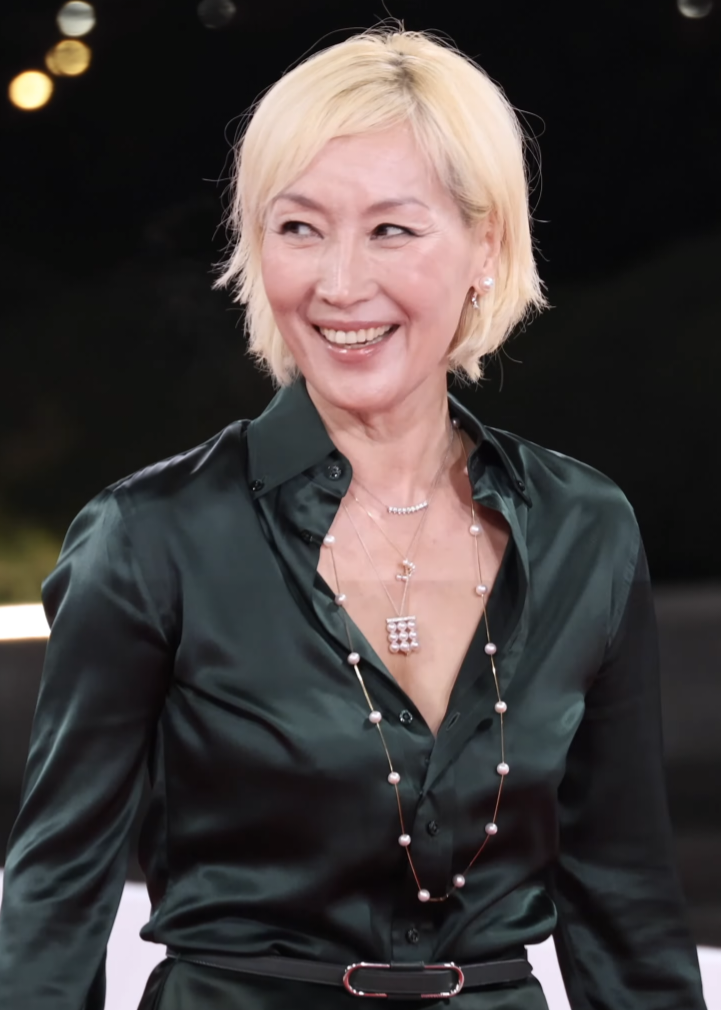
Lee Hye-young

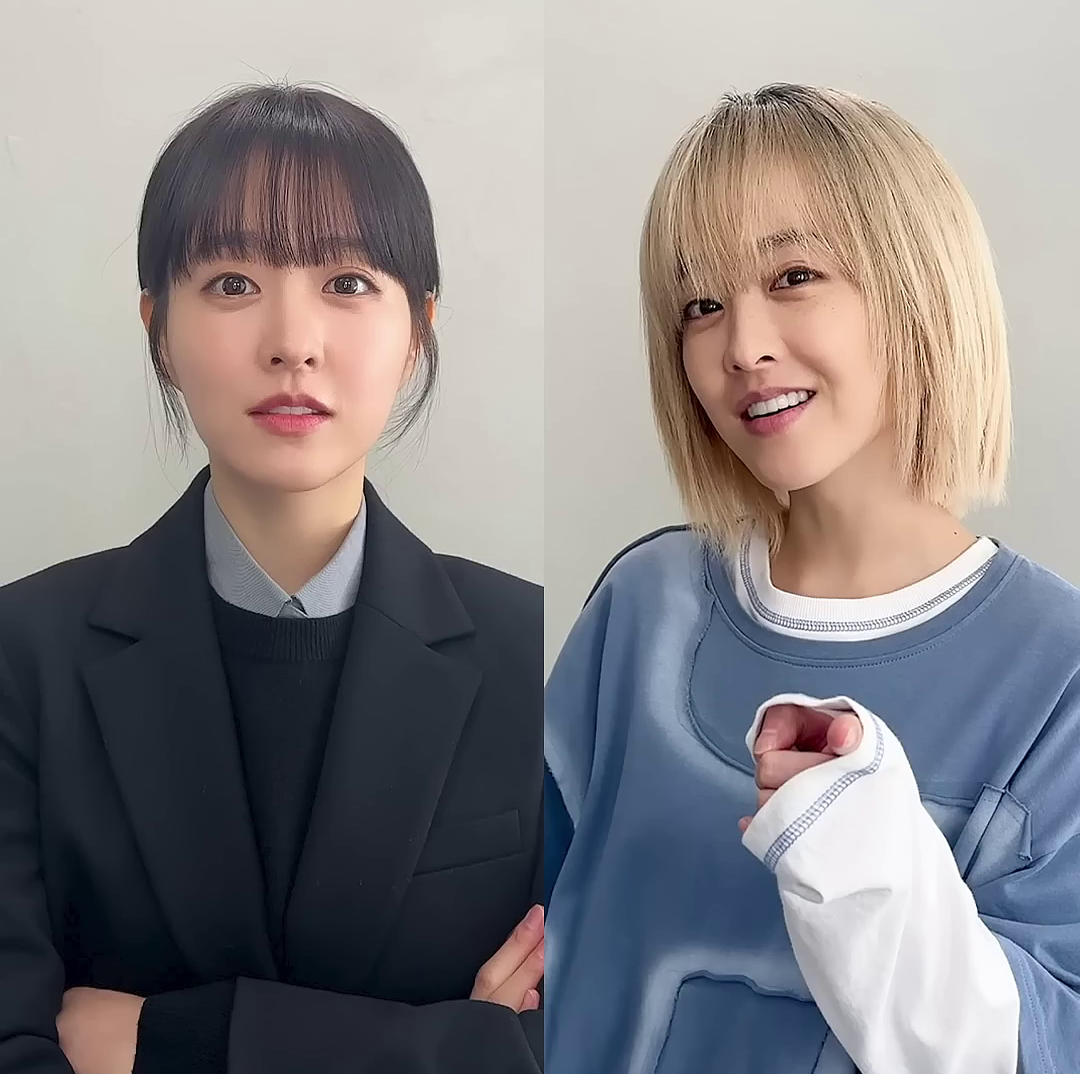
Park Bo-young

=== Bechdel Choice 10 ===
Bechdel Choice 10 of the Year
Film	Series
Dark Nuns; Blesser; Concerning My Daughter; Lucky, Apartment; Revolver; Victory; My Best, Your Least; The Old Woman with the Knife; High-Five; Because I Hate Korea	Good Partner; Miss Night and Day; A Virtuous Business; Unknown Seoul; Friendly Rivalry; The Tale of Lady Ok; When Life Gives You Tangerines; Hyper Knife; Jeongnyeon: The Star Is Born; Doubt

=== Bechdelian ===
Bechdellian of the Year
Director — Film	Director — Series
Lee Mi-rang – About Her	Jung Ji-in – Jeongnyeon: The Star Is Born
Producer — Film	Producer — Series
Lee An-na – Victory, High-Five	Han Seok-won; Hwang Ki-yong; Shin Hye-mi – A Virtuous Business
Screenwriter — Film	Screenwriter — Series
Kim Soo-yeon – Minimal Goodness	Park Ji-sook – The Tale of Lady Ok
Actress — Film	Actress — Series
Lee Hye-young – The Old Woman with the Knife	Park Bo-young – Unknown Seoul
