= Bechdel Day 2023 =

Annual awards ceremony

Bechdel Day
- Native name: 벡델데이 2023
- Sponsored by: Ministry of Culture, Sports and Tourism; Korean Film Council
- Date: September 6–7, 2023
- Venue: Indie Space, Seoul
- Country: South Korea
- Currently held by: Directors Guild of Korea (DGK)

Bechdel Day 2023 (Korean: 벡델데이 2023) was held on September 6–7, 2023 at the Indie Space (8th Floor, 176 Yanghwa-ro, Mapo-gu, Seoul). It was the fourth edition of Bechdel Day, an annual South Korean awards ceremony and event hosted by the Directors Guild of Korea (DGK) and by the Ministry of Culture, Sports and Tourism and the Korean Film Council. Established in 2020, the event evaluates and honors gender equality in South Korean film and television, utilizing the Bechdel test alongside expanded criteria.

== Program ==
=== Bechdel Choice 10 Screening (Film Category) ===
- Dates: September 1 (Fri) – September 3 (Sun)
- Venue: Indie Space

==== Screenings ====
- The Apartment with Two Women
- Next Sohee
- Dream Palace
- Min-young's Report Card
- Soulmate
- Alienoid
- Phantom
- Honest Candidate 2

==== Audience Q&A (GV) — Soulmate GV ====
- September 1 (Fri) | 19:00
- Moderator: Lee Hwa-jeong (Bechdel Day 2023 Programmer)
- Panel: Director Min Yong-geun, Byun Seung-min (CEO of Climax Studio)

==== Audience Q&A (GV) — Ghost GV ====
- September 3 (Sun) | 14:00
- Moderator: Film Critic Son Hee-jung
- Panel: Director Lee Hae-young

=== Bechdelian Awards & Meeting with Bechdelians ===
==== Bechdel Talk 1: Women Defying the Grammar of Genres ====
A talk program with this year's Bechdelian Series winners, exploring Bechdel Choice 10 selections and stories about female narratives that absorb and twist genre grammar.

- Date: September 2 (Sat) | 14:00
- Hosts: Actor Bong Tae-gyu, Lee Hwa-jeong (Bechdel Day 2023 Programmer)
- Panel: Director Lee Jong-pil, Writer Park Bara, Kim Min-jung (Professor of Creative Writing at Chung-Ang University)

==== Bechdel Talk 2: Women: Die or Be Bad ====
A talk program with this year's Bechdelian winners in the film category, discussing women struggling in their own ways and the faces of women of the here and now as recreated by Korean cinema.

- Date: September 2 (Sat) | 16:00
- Moderators: Film Director Namgung Sun, Lee Hwa-jeong (Bechdel Day 2023 Programmer)
- Panelists: Director July Jung (Next Sohee), Director Kim Se-in (The Apartment with Two Women), Lee Jin-hee (CEO of C-Seed Film, Gil Bok-soon)

== Winners ==
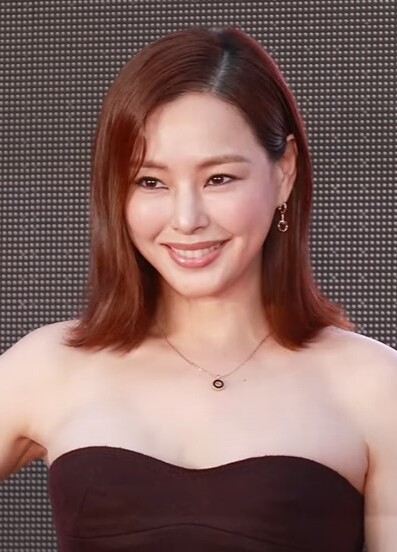
Lee Ha-nee

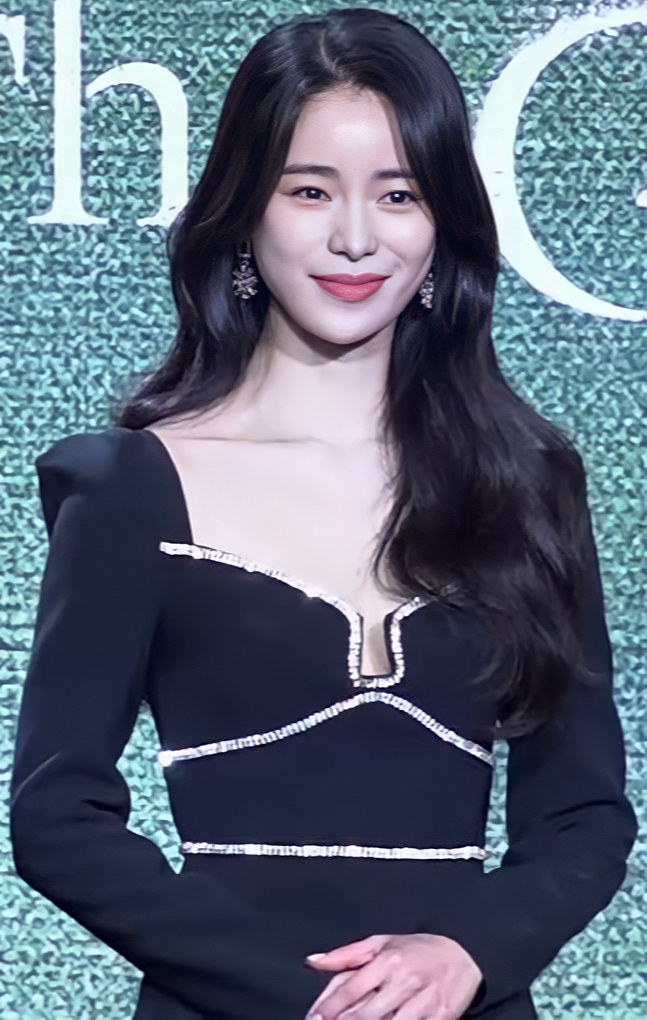
Lim Ji-yeon

=== Judging ===
On August 6, 2023, the Directors Guild of Korea (DGK) announced the "Bechdel Choice 10" film selections. Ten films were chosen through preliminary and final screenings out of 120 candidate works that were either theatrically released (with actual runs on at least 10 screens nationwide based on Korean Film Council network standards) or made available to the public between July 2022 and June 2023. The final judging panel for this year's film category consisted of Shin Hye-yeon, CEO of Insight Film (who was recognized as a Bechdelian producer for the film Anchor at Bechdel Day 2022), alongside Cineplay Editor-in-Chief and critic Joo Sung-chul, Seoul Independent Film Festival Executive Director Kim Dong-hyun, and The Seagull director Kim Mi-jo.

On the same date, the DGK also announced the "Bechdel Choice 10" series selections, evaluating works released between July 2022 and June 2023 through the lenses of gender equality and cultural diversity. A total of 84 works introduced across terrestrial networks, general programming, cable channels, and OTT originals were considered. The final judging panel for the series category included Kim Min-jung, Professor of Creative Writing at Chung-Ang University; Jin Myung-hyun, representative of Movement; and Na Won-jung, a reporter for the JoongAng Ilbo.

=== Bechdel Choice 10 ===
Bechdel Choice 10 of the Year
Film	Series
The Apartment with Two Women; Kill Boksoon; Next Sohee; Dream Palace; Min-young's Report Card; Soulmate; Alienoid; Phantom; Honest Candidate 2; You and I	Glitch; The Glory; Lies Hidden in My Garden; One Day Off; The Interest of Love; Under the Queen's Umbrella; My Perfect Stranger; Extraordinary Attorney Woo; Little Women; Queenmaker

=== Bechdelian ===
Bechdellian of the Year
Director — Film	Director — Series
July Jung – Next Sohee	Lee Jong-pil – One Day Off
Producer — Film	Producer — Series
Park Eun-kyung – Samjin Company English Class	Cho Moon-joo – Little Women
Screenwriter — Film	Screenwriter — Series
Kim Se-in – The Apartment with Two Women	Park Ba-ra – Under the Queen's Umbrella
Actress — Film	Actress — Series
Lee Ha-nee – Phantom	Lim Ji-yeon – The Glory, Lies Hidden in My Garden
