= Bechdel Day 2021 =

Annual awards ceremony

Bechdel Day
- Native name: 벡델데이 2021
- Sponsored by: Ministry of Culture, Sports and Tourism; Korean Film Council
- Date: September 4, 2021
- Country: South Korea
- Currently held by: Directors Guild of Korea (DGK)

Bechdel Day 2021 (Korean: 벡델데이 2021) was held on September 4, 2021 online. It marked the second edition of Bechdel Day, an annual South Korean awards ceremony and event hosted by the Directors Guild of Korea (DGK) and by the Ministry of Culture, Sports and Tourism and the Korean Film Council. Established in 2020, the event evaluates and honors gender equality in South Korean film and television, utilizing the Bechdel test alongside expanded criteria.

== Program ==
=== Bechdel Day 2021 ===
Hosted by Steering Committee Chair Min Kyu-dong and Programmer Lee Hwa-jeong, the event took place online on September 4 via the Directors Guild of Korea's Naver TV channel.

==== Bechdel Class: Author Kim Cho-yeop Masterclass ====
Part 1 begins at 11:00 and features author Kim Cho-yeop discussing the creation of female characters and female sci-fi narratives alongside moderator and film journalist Lee Hwa-yeong. Held online, the session includes an active Q&A with the audience through a real-time comment section.

==== Bechdel Symposium: The Broken Ladder of Korean Cinema, Is This Okay? ====
Beginning at 13:00, this symposium features Director Byun Young-joo and Producer Won Dong-yeon expanding the scope of their analysis to compare how male and female characters are portrayed in both the Bechdel Choice 10 selections and the top 20 domestic box office films. The data analysis was conducted by PD Jang Ji-yoon and KIST researcher Kim Hyun-joo, with results presented by Part 2 moderators Director Kim Dong-ryung and Director Shin Ah-ga.

==== Conversation with Bechdelians ====
The final third part is the Bechdel Roundtable, starting at 15:45. Hosted by the Room Corner 1st Row duo of Director Byun Young-joo and Actor Bong Tae-gyu, the session features four Bechdelians who contributed to the realization of gender equality in the Korean film industry this year: Director Hong Seong-eun, Director Park Ji-wan, Actor Yeom Hye-ran, and Producer Park Eun-kyung.

=== Bechdel Day 2021 Contest ===
Bechdel Day 2021 organized the Bechdel Video and Essay Contest to reach a wider audience. A total of 298 entries were submitted to the Bechdel Video Contest, from which five winning works were selected through rigorous evaluation based on the Bechdel Test criteria. The contest accepted various formats around twenty minutes in length, including short films, documentaries, and animations. To highlight works embodying the values of gender equality, eligible entries were required to have been produced after July 1, 2018. Going beyond awarding prizes, the event provided an opportunity to screen all five winning films together through Purplay, Korea's dedicated online streaming service for women's films, from September 9, 2021 (Thu) 13:54 to September 23, 2021 (Thu) 23:54.

== Winners ==
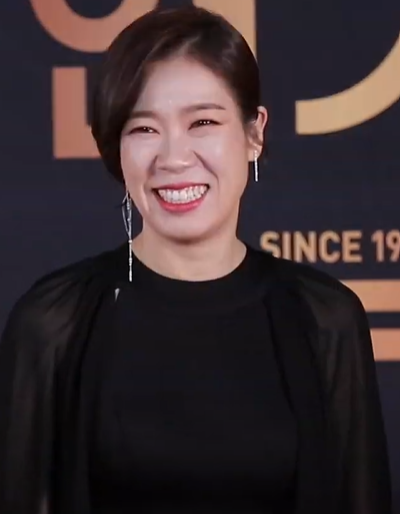
Yeom Hye-ran

=== Bechdel Choice 10 ===
Bechdel Choice 10 of the Year
Film
- Aloners
- I Don't Fire Myself
- Moving On
- The Day I Died: Unclosed Case
- Diva
- Light for the Youth
- Samjin Company English Class
- Whispering Corridors 6: The Humming
- The Call
- Black Light

=== Bechdelian ===
Bechdellian of the Year
Director — Film
- Hong Seong-eun
  – Aloners
Producer — Film
- Park Eun-kyung
  – Samjin Company English Class
Screenwriter — Film
- Park Ji-wan
  – The Day I Died: Unclosed Case
Actress — Film
- Yeom Hye-ran
  – Black Light

=== Bechdel Day 2021 Contest ===
Bechdel Day 2021 Contest Winner
Film
- In Search of Haemi
- Good Mother
- The bird I saw last year
- Americas
- Youngsook
