= Dreaming of a Freaking Fairy Tale =

2024 South Korean television series

- Promotional poster
- Hangul: 나는 대놓고 신데렐라를 꿈꾼다
- Lit.: I Openly Dream of Becoming Cinderella
- RR: Naneun daenoko Sinderellareul kkumkkunda
- MR: Nanŭn taenok'o Sinderellarŭl kkumkkunda
- Genre: Romantic comedy
- Created by: Baek Mi-kyung
- Written by: Yoo Ja
- Directed by: Kim Min-kyung
- Starring: Pyo Ye-jin; Lee Jun-young
- Music by: Im Ha-young
- Country of origin: South Korea
- Original language: Korean
- No. of episodes: 10

Production
- Executive producers: Baek Mi-kyung; Park Sung-jae (CP); Oh Seung-joon
- Producers: Gong Hyo-soon; Park Sung-eun
- Cinematography: Jung Jin-ho; Kim Young-kwang
- Editors: Im Sun-kyung; Song In-yeop
- Running time: 43–45 minutes
- Production companies: CJ ENM; Story Phoenix; KeyEast

Original release
- Network: TVING
- Release: May 31 – June 28, 2024

Dreaming of a Freaking Fairy Tale (Korean: 나는 대놓고 신데렐라를 꿈꾼다) is a 2024 South Korean romantic comedy television series created by Baek Mi-kyung, written by Yoo Ja, directed by Kim Min-kyung, and starring Pyo Ye-jin and Lee Jun-young. The series portray a 21st-century Cinderella who climbs on a white horse and overcomes the world and its limitations. It was released on TVING from May 31, to June 28, 2024, every Friday at 12:00 (KST). It is also available for streaming on Viu and Paramount+ in selected regions.

== Synopsis ==
Dreaming of a Freaking Fairy Tale is a hybrid romantic comedy drama depicting the process in which a woman whose dream is to become a Cinderella meets a prince on a white horse who does not believe in love. Both support and torment each other due to the reality that is difficult to escape.

== Cast and characters ==
=== Main ===
- Pyo Ye-jin as Shin Jae-rim

A person who gets a job as a manager of Cheongdam Heaven, a social club because she wants to find prince on a white horse. However, she is a 21st-century Cinderella who gradually overcomes the past of depending on someone and longing for love, and gradually becomes stronger to accept her life and win love independently.

- Lee Jun-young as Moon Cha-min

The head of Cheongdam Heaven, a social club and an arrogant prince of a chaebol family who does not trust people. He hates women who dreams of being Cinderella but realizes his feelings when he becomes entangled with Jae-rim.

=== Supporting ===
- Kim Hyun-jin as Baek Do-hong

A self-made 10-million movie director who has a secret.

- Kim Chae-eun as Kang Soo-jin

An obstetrician and gynecologist and the eldest daughter who protects her mother and younger siblings.

- Song Ji-woo as Ban Dan-ah

A lawless princess who pursues elegance.

- Lee Da-hye
- Do Byeong-hun as Heo Young-bae

A social club manager and Cha-min's secretary at Cheongdam Heaven.

- Ryu Seung-soo as Jae-rim's father
- Baek Joo-hee as Hwang So-ra

Jae-rim's stepmother.

- Ahn Hyun-jeong as Yang Se-ri

a hipster waitress at Cheongdam Heaven who thinks she's pretty but has nothing to prove but her age.

=== Special Appearance ===
- Jang Hyuk-jin as Choi Kyung-ku

== Production ==
=== Development ===
Writer Baek Mi-kyung, who wrote dramas such as Strong Girl Bong-soon (2017), The Lady in Dignity (2017) and Mine (2021), created Dreaming of a Freaking Fairy Tale under the working title She Dreams of Cinderella (Korean: 그녀는 신데렐라를 꿈꾼다) as her next work and Yoo Ja wrote the script of the series. KeyEast and Story Phoenix signed a production contract and joined Baek to produce the series.

=== Casting ===
Kim Ji-eun was first offered the role of the female lead in June 2023. Later in September of the same year, Pyo Ye-jin was reported to star for the series. The next three days, Lee Jun-young was offered to lead alongside Pyo. Pyo and Lee appearances were officially confirmed a week later.

== Original soundtrack ==
=== Part 1 ===
All lyrics are written by Logoone and Han Kyung-soo; all music is composed by Logoone and Han Kyung-soo.

Released on June 1, 2024
No.	Title	Artist	Length
1.	"Falling" (스며드는 중)	Kei	3:29
2.	"Falling" (스며드는 중; Inst.)		3:29
Total length:			6:58

=== Part 2 ===
All lyrics are written by Kinsha; all music is composed by Oneway and Allthou.

Released on June 7, 2024
No.	Title	Artist	Length
1.	"BBDBBDB" (비비디 바비디 부)	Soovi	3:10
2.	"BBDBBDB" (비비디 바비디 부; Inst.)		3:10
Total length:			6:20

=== Part 3 ===
All lyrics are written by Kuni; all music is composed by Kuni and HEon.

Released on June 15, 2024
No.	Title	Artist	Length
1.	"Gist" (어떻게 널 사랑하지 않겠어)	Charms	2:52
2.	"Gist" (어떻게 널 사랑하지 않겠어; Inst.)		2:52
Total length:			5:44

=== Part 4 ===
All lyrics are written by Kinsha; all music is composed by Allthou, Suhyun Kim, Park Hyun-seo, Flora, 153/Joombas.

Released on June 21, 2024
No.	Title	Artist	Length
1.	"Star" (별)	Junny	4:09
2.	"Star" (별; Inst.)		4:09
Total length:			8:18

=== Part 5 ===
All lyrics are written by Piri Boi, Han Hae-ji, Charlie Bean; all music is composed by Piri Boi, Han Hae-ji, Charlie Bean.

Released on June 28, 2024
No.	Title	Artist	Length
1.	"Intersection" (교집힙)	Charlie Bean Works	3:48
2.	"Intersection" (교집힙; Inst.)		3:48
Total length:			7:36

== Release ==
The series was confirmed to be released on TVING in 2024. It will also stream on Paramount+ as part of Paramount's global partnership with leading entertainment company CJ ENM. The series was also reported sold to Viu, in the case where Paramount+ was currently unavailable in Southeast Asian markets. It was confirmed that the series would be release on May 31, 2024.
