= Shin Dong-woo =

Shin Dong-woo may refer to:

- Shin Dong-woo (actor), South Korean actor
- CNU (singer) (born Shin Dong-woo), South Korean singer and member of group B1A4
