= Park Joo-mi =

South Korean actress (born 1972)

- Born: October 5, 1972 (age 54); Seoul, South Korea
- Education: Seoul Institute of the Arts; Sungkyunkwan University
- Occupation: Actress
- Years active: 1991–present
- Agent: Studio Santa Claus Entertainment
- Spouse: Lee Jang-won (m. 2001)
- Children: 2

Korean name
- Hangul: 박주미
- RR: Bak Jumi
- MR: Pak Chumi

Park Joo-mi (Korean: 박주미; born October 5, 1972) is a South Korean actress.

== Career ==
Park made her entertainment debut as an Asiana Airlines model, then began acting in 1991, starring in television dramas such as Beautiful Seoul (1999) and Feels Good (2000). After appearing in Ladies of the Palace, Park married businessman Lee Jang-won in 2001 and temporarily retired from acting to focus on her family (she gave birth to her sons in 2002 and 2007). During this time, Park intermittently appeared in commercials and co-hosted the variety show Yeo Yoo Man Man from 2003 to 2005. After a nine-year absence, she made her screen comeback in the thriller Man of Vendetta (2010) and the family drama Believe in Love (2011). In 2012, Park had been playing Queen Seondeok in the period drama Dream of the Emperor for 18 episodes (of a projected 70), when a car accident on the way to the set resulted in internal injuries, and she had to drop out of the series to undergo medical treatment. Upon her recovery, Park returned to television in 2014 with The Story of Kang-goo.

In February 2019, Park signed with new agency Huayi Brothers.

In 2023, Park starred in TV Chosun's fantasy melodrama series Durian's Affair.

== Filmography ==
=== Television series ===
Year	Title	Role	Notes/Ref.
1991	Eyes of Dawn		
1991	Our Paradise	Myung-jin	
1993	Walking All the Way to Heaven	Gu Yeon-soo's younger sister	
1993	Mountain Wind		
1994	Kkachi	Baek So-ra	
1994	Three Families Under One Roof	Im Ji-ae	
1994	Kareisky		
1996	Jo Gwang-jo	Queen Janggyeong	
1996	Dad Is the Boss		
1997	The Angel Within		
1997	One Thousand and One Nights		
1997	Woman Eating Bap Alone	Daughter	
1999	School 2	Kim Jung-in	
1999	Hur Jun	Lady Kim, Gong-bin	
1999	Beautiful Seoul	Yoo Hye-won	
2000	Feels Good	Eun-young	
2000	School 3	Kim Jung-in	
2000	Ajumma	Jang Ah-young	
2001	Ladies of the Palace	Gisaeng Ok Mae-hyang	
2011	Believe in Love	Seo Hye-jin	
2012	A Gentleman's Dignity	Kim Eun-hee	
2012	Dream of the Emperor	Princess Deokman/Queen Seondeok	(episodes 1-18)
2014	The Story of Kang-goo	Yang Moon-sook	
2015	Blood	Han Sun-young	
2016	Flowers of the Prison	Chung Nanjung	
2018	Come and Hug Me	Ji Hye-won	Cameo
2018	Gangnam Beauty	Na Hye-sung	
2021–2022	Love (ft. Marriage and Divorce)	Sa Pi-young	Season 1–3
2023	Durian's Affair	Du Ri-an	

=== Film ===
Year	Title	Role
2010	Man of Vendetta	Park Min-kyung
2016	The Last Princess	Yang Gwi-in

=== Variety show ===
Year	Title	Notes
1994	Between Night and Music	Host
1995	Today Is a Good Day	Host
1996	Scoop Entertainment City	Host
2003–2005	Yeo Yoo Man Man with Lee Hong-ryeol and Park Joo-mi	Host
2014	반달이 준 선물	Host
2015	Brave Family	
2017	The Swan Club	Cast Member (Starting Episode 2)

== Awards and nominations ==
Name of the award ceremony, year presented, category, nominee of the award, and the result of the nomination
Award ceremony	Year	Category	Nominee / Work	Result	Ref.
APAN Star Awards	2022	Top Excellence Award, Actress in a Serial Drama	Love (ft. Marriage and Divorce) 2 and 3	Nominated	
Asia Artist Awards	2021	Best Actor Award	Park Joo-mi	Won	
KBS Drama Awards	2011	Excellence Award, Actress in a Serial Drama	Believe in Love	Nominated	
