= Work Later, Drink Now =

2021–2023 South Korean web series

- Main poster for second season
- Also known as: City Girl Drinkers
- Hangul: 술꾼도시여자들
- Lit.: Drinker City Women
- RR: Sulkkun dosi yeojadeul
- MR: Sulkkun tosi yŏjadŭl
- Genre: Comedy; Slice of life
- Created by: TVING (Plan Production)
- Based on: Drinker City Women by Mikkang
- Written by: Wi So-young
- Directed by: Kim Jung-sik
- Starring: Lee Sun-bin; Han Sun-hwa; Jung Eun-ji; Choi Si-won
- Music by: Park Se-jun; Oh-woo
- Country of origin: South Korea
- Original language: Korean
- No. of seasons: 2
- No. of episodes: 24

Production
- Executive producers: Yoon Ye-taek; Yang Se-kwan; Park Soon-tae
- Producers: Moon Seok-hwan; Oh Gwang-hoe; Choi Ah-reum
- Running time: 30–46 minutes
- Production company: Bon Factory

Original release
- Network: TVING
- Release: October 22, 2021 – January 13, 2023

Work Later, Drink Now (Korean: 술꾼도시여자들) is a South Korean comedy slice of life web series based on the Kakao Webtoon's Drinker City Women by Mikkang, starring Lee Sun-bin, Han Sun-hwa, Jung Eun-ji, and Choi Si-won. The first season aired on TVING for 12 episodes from October 22 to November 26, 2021. The second season aired on TVING for 12 episodes from December 9, 2022, to January 13, 2023.

The first season re-aired on television network tvN from February 3 to 18, 2022, airing every Wednesday and Thursday at 22:30 (KST) for five episodes.

== Synopsis ==
Work Later, Drink Now tells the story of three women whose belief in life is one drink at the end of the day.

== Cast ==
=== Main ===
- Lee Sun-bin as Ahn So-hee

A workaholic broadcast writer.

- Han Sun-hwa as Han Ji-yeon

A ditzy yoga instructor.

- Jung Eun-ji as Kang Ji-goo

A stony origami YouTuber.

- Choi Si-won as Kang Book-goo

An entertainment producer director (PD) working in the same department as writer Ahn So-hee.

=== Supporting ===
- Han Ji-hyo as Se Jin

A girl who is not shy and has a bold style.

- Lee Hyun-jin as Ji-yong

A handsome young man trapped in Ji-yeon's radar.

- Lee Soo-min as So-hyeon
- Yoon Shi-yoon as Han Woo-Joo/Mr. Nice Paper
- Lee Yoon-ji as yoga teacher

=== Special appearances ===
Season 1

- Jung Eun-pyo as Ahn So-hee's father
- Song Young-jae as Taxi driver
- Kim Ji-seok as Kim Hak Soo
- Ha Do-kwon
- Leeteuk
- Song Jae-rim as Song Pd
- Jo Jung-chi as Ahn So-hee's ex-boyfriend.
- Park Yeong-gyu as President Park
- Jung Seok-yong as Ahn So-hee's Publishing Manager
- Shin Hyeon-seung as Kang Jigu ex-boyfriend

Season 2

- Yoo In-young as Kim Seon-jeong
- Son Ho-jun
- Jo Yu-ri as Sieun
- Jo Jung-chi as Ahn So-hee's ex-boyfriend
- Lee Pil-mo as Han Ji-yeon's father

== Original soundtrack ==
=== Season 1 ===
Part 1

Released on October 12, 2021
No.	Title	Lyrics	Music	Artist	Length
1.	"The Night With You"	Red Socks; Inan; Park Se-jun	Red Socks; Inan	Han Sun-hwa	3:04
2.	"The Night With You" (Inst.)		Red Socks; Inan		3:02
Total length:					6:06

Part 2

Released on October 29, 2021
No.	Title	Lyrics	Music	Artist	Length
1.	"A Drink of Life" (인생 한잔)	Red Socks; Inan; Park Se-jun	Red Socks; Inan	Jung Eun-ji	3:23
2.	"A Drink of Life" (인생 한잔; Inst.)		Red Socks; Inan		3:23
Total length:					6:46

Part 3

Released on November 5, 2021
No.	Title	Lyrics	Music	Artist	Length
1.	"Dreamer"	Jayins; Naiv	Jayins; Naiv	Lee Sun-bin	3:36
2.	"Dreamer" (Inst.)		Jayins; Naiv		3:36
Total length:					7:12

Part 4

Released on November 12, 2021
No.	Title	Lyrics	Music	Artist	Length
1.	"Drink" (술잔에)	Kz; B.O.	Kz; Kim Tae-young; Bayside Pablo; B.O.	Kim Boa	3:13
2.	"Drink" (술잔에; Inst.)		Kz; Kim Tae-young; Bayside Pablo; B.O.		3:13
Total length:					6:26

Part 5

Released on November 19, 2021
No.	Title	Lyrics	Music	Artist	Length
1.	"Nobody but you"	Danke; McKay	220; 407; McKay	Choi Si-won	5:11
2.	"Nobody but you" (Inst.)		220; 407; McKay		5:11
Total length:					10:22

=== Season 2 ===
Part 1

Released on December 8, 2022
No.	Title	Lyrics	Music	Artist	Length
1.	"The Moon of Seoul" (서울의 달)	Choi Joon-young	Kim Gun-mo; Choi In-young	Big Mama	3:06
2.	"The Moon of Seoul" (서울의 달; Inst.)		Kim Gun-mo; Choi In-young		3:06
Total length:					6:12

Part 2

Released on December 16, 2022
No.	Title	Lyrics	Music	Artist	Length
1.	"Last Forever"	Han Jae-wan; Se Hwa	Han Jae-wan	Kang Daniel	3:56
2.	"Last Forever" (Inst.)		Han Jae-wan; Se Hwa		3:56
Total length:					7:52

Part 3

Released on December 23, 2022
No.	Title	Lyrics	Music	Artist	Length
1.	"Cheers!"	Haru	Ikek (Equal); Haru	Wheein	3:03
2.	"Cheers!" (Inst.)		Ikek (Equal); Haru		3:03
Total length:					6:06

Part 4

Released on December 31, 2022
No.	Title	Lyrics	Music	Artist	Length
1.	"Before Sunrise"	Mia	Mia; Luca	Cheeze	4:14
2.	"Before Sunrise" (Inst.)		Mia; Luca		4:14
Total length:					8:28

Part 5

Released on January 6, 2023
No.	Title	Lyrics	Music	Artist	Length
1.	"Drink It, Girls!" (적셔!)	Jade	Luca	Jo Yu-ri	2:56
2.	"Drink It, Girls!" (적셔!; Inst.)		Luca		2:56
Total length:					5:52

== Viewership ==
Work Later, Drink Now : South Korea viewers per episode (thousands)

Season	Episode number					Average
Season	1	2	3	4	5	Average
1	867	746	688	751	830	476

Source: Audience measurement performed nationwide by Nielsen Korea.

Average TV viewership ratings
Ep.	Original broadcast date	Average audience share Nielsen Korea	
Ep.	Original broadcast date	Nationwide	Seoul
1	February 3, 2022	3.354% (1st)	3.787% (1st)
2	February 9, 2022	2.967% (2nd)	3.865% (1st)
3	February 10, 2022	2.900% (1st)	3.412% (1st)
4	February 17, 2022	3.103% (2nd)	3.272% (3rd)
5	February 18, 2022	3.321% (1st)	3.927% (1st)
Average		3.129%	3.653%
In the table above, the blue numbers represent the lowest ratings and the red numbers represent the highest ratings.; This television series airs on a cable channel/pay TV which normally has a relatively smaller audience compared to free-to-air TV/public broadcasters (KBS, SBS, MBC and EBS).

== Production ==
On March 9, 2022, it was confirmed that the series would air at the Cannes International Series Festival 2022 from April 1–6, 2022.

== Accolades ==
Name of the award ceremony, year presented, category, nominee of the award, and the result of the nomination
Award ceremony	Year	Category	Nominee	Result	Ref.
APAN Star Awards	2022	Excellence Award, Actress in an OTT Drama	Han Sun-hwa	Won	
Asia Model Awards	2023	Popular Star Award (Actor)	Lee Sun-bin	Won	
Bechdel Day	2022	Bechdel Choice 5 — Series	Work Later, Drink Now	Won	
