= The Old Woman with the Knife =

2025 film by Min Kyu-dong

- Theatrical release poster
- Hangul: 파과
- Hanja: 破果
- Lit.: Breakthrough
- RR: Pagwa
- MR: P'agwa
- Directed by: Min Kyu-dong
- Screenplay by: Kim Dong-wan; Min Kyu-dong
- Based on: The Old Woman with the Knife by Gu Byeong-mo
- Produced by: Min Jin-soo
- Starring: Lee Hye-young; Kim Sung-cheol
- Cinematography: Lee Jae-woo
- Edited by: Jung Jung Eun
- Music by: Kim Jun-seong
- Production company: Soo Film
- Distributed by: Next Entertainment World; M-Line Distribution
- Release dates: 20 February 2025 (Berlinale); 30 April 2025 (South Korea)
- Running time: 122 minutes; 133 minutes (International cut)
- Country: South Korea
- Language: Korean
- Box office: US$3.8 million

The Old Woman with the Knife (Korean: 파과) is a 2025 South Korean action thriller film directed and co-written by Min Kyu-dong, based on the novel of the same name by Gu Byeong-mo. It stars Lee Hye-young as a legendary assassin with declining health, and Kim Sung-cheol as a threatening, unhinged assassin obsessed with her.

The film premiered at the 75th Berlin International Film Festival on February 20, 2025 as part of Berlinale Special programme.

== Synopsis ==
In 1975, Hornclaw was a street urchin adopted by a kind couple who owned a diner and she worked as helper in the diner. A US soldier assaulted and tried to rape Hornclaw but Hornclaw killed him in self-defense. The husband, Ji-wo discovered it and revealed himself to be an assassin of an underground organization masqueraded as a pest control company dedicated to remove people who are considered "vermins" in society. He covered up her crime and trained her to become an assassin codenamed "Nail." Eventually, Ji-wo's assassin life took a toll on him as his enemies killed his wife and child. Ji-wo sought out the gang that killed his wife and son but was killed due to overwhelming numbers of gangster after dispatching several of them. Hornclaw came and killed the remaining gang. Seeing the demise of her mentor's family, Hornclaw swore to not have any attachments.

Decades later, Hornclaw is now a seasoned assassin in her sixties and has become a legendary figure in the underworld who is known for quietly assassinating targets with her poisoned-tipped hair pin. She has been dissatisfied with the organization directions in the present day as they now act more like a pure assassin-for-hire organization than a noble assassin organization. She faces upheaval when Bullfight, a skilled young hitman, seeks to partner with her. Unaware of his true identity, she fails to recognize their past connection. As tensions rise, their relationship spirals into a deadly confrontation fueled by vengeance and survival.

== Cast ==
- Lee Hye-young as Hornclaw / Godmother / Nails
  - Shin Si-ah as young Hornclaw
- Kim Sung-cheol as Bullfight
- Yeon Woo-jin as Dr. Kang
- Kim Mu-yeol as Ryoo
- Ok Ja-yeon as Cho-yeop
- Kim Kang-woo as Director Son
- Choi Moo-sung as Jang-bi

== Production ==
In February 2024, Kim Sung-cheol was cast in the film as the antagonist. In June 2024, Lee Hye-young was cast as the main character in the film.

== Release ==
The Old Woman with the Knife had its world premiere in the Berlinale Special section of the 75th Berlin International Film Festival on 20 February 2025.

The film was invited to the competition section of the 43rd Brussels International Fantastic Film Festival held from April 8 to April 20, 2025. Later on April 30, it was released theatrically in South Korea.

The film was selected at the 24th New York Asian Film Festival held from July 11 to July 25, 2025 for its New York Premiere in Prime Picks. It will have its first screening on July 12 at the Film at LOOK Cinemas W57. It was also presented in the Korean Cinema Today section at the 30th Busan International Film Festival on September 18, 2025.

It was invited to compete in the Crossovers Competition section of the Strasbourg European Fantastic Film Festival. It was screened on September 28, 2025.

On 15 October 2025, it was screened at the 58th Sitges Film Festival in the 'Òrbita' section.

== Reception ==
=== Box office ===
The film was released on April 30, 2025 on 641 screens.

As of July 5, 2025, the film has grossed US$3,852,545 from 550,316 admissions.

=== Accolades ===
Award ceremony	Year	Category	Nominee / Work	Result	Ref.
Baeksang Arts Awards	2026	Best Actress	Lee Hye-young	Nominated	
Bechdel Day	2025	Bechdel Choice 10 — Film	The Old Woman with the Knife	Won	
Bechdel Day	2025	Bechdelian in film — Actress of the Year	Lee Hye-young	Won	
Blue Dragon Film Awards	2025	Best Film	The Old Woman with the Knife	Nominated	
Blue Dragon Film Awards	2025	Best Director	Min Kyu-dong	Nominated	
Blue Dragon Film Awards	2025	Best Actress	Lee Hye-young	Nominated	
Blue Dragon Film Awards	2025	Best Supporting Actor	Kim Sung-cheol	Nominated	
Blue Dragon Film Awards	2025	Technical Award	Seo Jeong-ju (Martial Arts)	Nominated	
Buil Film Awards	2025	Best Actress	Lee Hye-young	Nominated	
Buil Film Awards	2025	Best Cinematography	Lee Jae-woo	Nominated	
Director's Cut Awards	2026	Best Actress (Film)	Lee Hye-young	Nominated	
Director's Cut Awards	2026	Best New Actor (Film)	Kim Sung-cheol	Nominated	
Korean Film Producers Association Awards	2025	Best Actress	Lee Hye-young	Won	
Strasbourg European Fantastic Film Festival	2025	Crossovers Grand Prix	The Old Woman with the Knife	Nominated	
