= Baek Mi-kyung =

South Korean screenwriter

- Born: 1971 (age 54–55); South Korea
- Occupation: Screenwriter
- Years active: 2014–present
- Organization: Korea Television and Radio Writers Association
- Agent: Story Phoenix

Korean name
- Hangul: 백미경
- RR: Baek Migyeong
- MR: Paek Migyŏng

Baek Mi-kyung (born 1971) is a South Korean television and film screenwriter. She has written dramas such as Strong Girl Bong-soon (JTBC, 2017) and The Lady in Dignity (JTBC, 2017).

== Early life ==
Baek won numerous writing awards during her elementary school years, though she initially did not aspire to become a writer. At the time, she associated the profession with financial difficulty. During high school, a disciplinary incident resulted in a year-long assignment to write reflective essays, which prompted her to begin chronicling her life. Recognizing her talent, a teacher subsequently encouraged her to pursue writing as a career.

== Career ==
=== Beginning ===
Baek's writing career began in 2000 when she won the Excellence Award at the 1st MBC Production Film Screenplay Contest. However, following the plagiarism of her winning work, she temporarily abandoned the profession. She relocated to Daegu, where she opened a successful private English academy and established herself as a prominent instructor.

She eventually resumed writing and gained recognition after winning the Grand Prize at the 2013 SBS Screenplay Contest. Her winning script was adapted into the one-act drama The Story of Kang-goo, a series depicting the lives of a man and a woman in Ganggu Port, Yeongdeok, which marked her official debut as a television screenwriter.

=== JTBC dramas ===
Following her Grand Prize win at the 2013 SBS Screenplay Contest, Baek received numerous scriptwriting offers from major terrestrial networks. In an unusual move, she declined these offers and chose to partner with JTBC instead. Her first full-length television series was My Love Eun-dong (JTBC, 2015). Rejecting an offer from MBC to air the project on a terrestrial channel, Baek opted for JTBC because she preferred a deliberate, unhurried approach to production over simply rushing to a major network.

Her subsequent project, Strong Woman Do Bong-soon (JTBC, 2017), focused on a female protagonist with superhuman strength passed down through her maternal lineage. Baek later noted on a television talk show that this was the project she held the deepest affection for. The series achieved critical and commercial acclaim, with its final episode recording 8.96% nationwide viewership, which temporarily made it the highest-rated drama in JTBC history.

Baek incorporated elements of her past experiences into her next series, The Lady in Dignity (JTBC, 2017), notably featuring a character who directs an English academy, mirroring Baek's earlier career. Although two terrestrial channels expressed interest in the project, she chose to work with JTBC once more on a fully pre-produced format. The drama held the record as JTBC's highest-rated series for a year and a half until Sky Castle surpassed it in 2018. Through these consecutive successes, Baek played a central role in revitalizing JTBC's dramatic programming block following a period of declining viewership.

=== Branching out to other networks ===
Following her success with JTBC, Baek expanded her work to other networks. The Miracle We Met (KBS2, 2018) is a human melodrama starring Kim Myung-min, Kim Hyun-joo, Ra Mi-ran, Ko Chang-seok, and Joseph Lee, which follows an ordinary family man who unexpectedly finds himself living the life of another man who shares his name and age but possesses a completely opposite lifestyle.

She later collaborated with tvN for Melting Me Softly (2019), starring Ji Chang-wook, Won Jin-ah, and Yoon Se-ah. Created by Studio Dragon and produced by Baek's own company, Story Phoenix, the series centers on a man and a woman who participate in a 24-hour cryogenic freezing project only to wake up twenty years later.

Baek continued her work with tvN in 2021 by partnering with director Lee Na-jeong on Mine. Initially titled "Blue Diamond," the series explores the lives of wealthy family members and their servants, focusing on women who defy societal prejudices to find their true selves. Mine made history as the first Korean drama to feature a lesbian character in a leading role, broadening representation in the industry.

Baek subsequently returned to JTBC with Strong Girl Nam-soon (2023), a spin-off of her 2017 series Strong Girl Bong-soon. Starring Lee Yoo-mi alongside Kim Jung-eun, Kim Hae-sook, Ong Seong-wu, and Byeon Woo-seok. The series aired on JTBC and streamed globally on Netflix, achieving strong commercial success with its final episode recording a nationwide rating of 10.42%.

== Filmography ==
=== Film ===
Writing credit for feature film
Year	Title	Screenwriter	Ref.
2018	Heung-boo: The Revolutionist	Yes	

=== Television series ===
Writing credit for television series
Year	Title	Broadcaster	Credited as			Ref.
Year	Title	Broadcaster	Creator	Scriptwriter	Executive Producer	Ref.
2014	The Story of Kang-goo	SBS	No	Yes	No	
2015	This Is My Love	JTBC	No	Yes	No	
2017	Strong Girl Bong-soon	JTBC	No	Yes	No	
2017	The Lady in Dignity	JTBC	No	Yes	No	
2018	The Miracle We Met	KBS2	No	Yes	No	
2019	Melting Me Softly	tvN	No	Yes	Yes	
2021	Mine	tvN	No	Yes	No	
2024	Strong Girl Nam-soon	JTBC	No	Yes	Yes	
2024	Dreaming of a Freaking Fairy Tale	TVING	Yes	No	No	

== Accolades ==
=== Awards and nominations ===
Awards and nominations
Award	Year	Category	Recipient(s)	Result	Ref.
58th Baeksang Arts Awards	2022	Best Screenplay	Mine	Nominated	
Bechdel Day	2024	Bechdelian of the Year (Drama Category)	Strong Girl Nam-soon	Won	
10th Gyeongsangbuk-do Video Content Scenario Contest	2012	Encouragement Award	Baek Mi-kyung	Won	
1st MBC Production Film Scenario Contest	2000	Excellence Award	Baek Mi-kyung	Won	
MBC Screenplay Contest	2014	Outstanding Work in the Miniseries Category	Baek Mi-kyung	Won	
SBS Screenplay Contest	2013	Grand Prize	The Story of Kang-goo	Won	

=== State honors ===
Name of country, year given, and name of honor
Country	Award Ceremony	Year	Honor	Ref.
South Korea	7th Korean Popular Culture and Arts Awards	2017	Minister of Culture, Sports and Tourism's Commendation	

=== Listicle ===
Name of publisher, year listed, name of listicle, and placement
Publisher	Year	List	Placement	Ref.
Cine21	2023	22 Writers	Shortlisted	
