= Bechdel Day 2022 =

Annual awards ceremony

Bechdel Day
- Native name: 벡델데이 2022
- Sponsored by: Ministry of Culture, Sports and Tourism; Korean Film Council
- Date: September 6–7, 2022
- Venue: Chungmu Arts Center Small Theater Blue, Seoul
- Country: South Korea
- Currently held by: Directors Guild of Korea (DGK)

Bechdel Day 2022 (Korean: 벡델데이 2022) was held on September 6–7, 2022 at Chungmu Arts Center Small Theater Blue. It marked the third edition of Bechdel Day, an annual South Korean awards ceremony and event hosted by the Directors Guild of Korea (DGK) and by the Ministry of Culture, Sports and Tourism and the Korean Film Council. Established in 2020, the event evaluates and honors gender equality in South Korean film and television, utilizing the Bechdel test alongside expanded criteria.

== Program ==
=== Bechdel Choice 10 Screenings ===
Screenings feature the 10 films selected for Bechdel Day 2022, highlighting works that advanced gender equality in the Korean film industry over the past year.

- Dates: August 31 (Wednesday) – September 2 (Friday)
- Venue: Chungmu Arts Center Small Theater Blue
- Featured Films: The Seagull, Kyung-ah's Daughter, Ten Months into the Future, Anchor, Romance Without Love, Homage, Yoon Si-nae Has Disappeared, Perhaps Love, The Best Life, Decision to Leave

=== Bechdel Talk: Kang Soo-yeon: A Woman Who Sketched the Times ===
This session examines the film career of the late actress Kang Soo-yeon through the lens of gender equality, focusing on the characters in her representative works.

- Date & Time: September 3 (Saturday), 14:00 – 15:30
- Venue: Chungmu Arts Center Small Theater Blue and DGK YouTube Live Stream
- Moderator: Lee Hwa-jeong (Bechdel Day 2022 Programmer)
- Panel: Actress Kim Bora and the YouTube Movie Gunjo Team (Critics Joo Seong-cheol, Kim Do-hoon, and Bae Soon-tak)
- Note: Kang Soo-yeon's short film Juri will be screened prior to the discussion.

=== Meeting with Bechdelians: Again, One Step Closer to Gender Equality ===
A talk program featuring this year's Bechdelian laureates, covering discussions on the Bechdel Choice 10 selections and candid insights on gender equality in Korean cinema.

- Date & Time: September 3 (Saturday), 16:30 – 18:30
- Venue: Chungmu Arts Center and DGK YouTube Live Stream
- Moderators: Director Min Kyu-dong and Actor Bong Tae-gyu
- Panel: Director Shin Su-won, Writer Jeong Seo-kyung, and Producer Shin Hye-yeon
- Note: The Bechdelian Awards Ceremony will be held prior to the main session.

== Winners ==
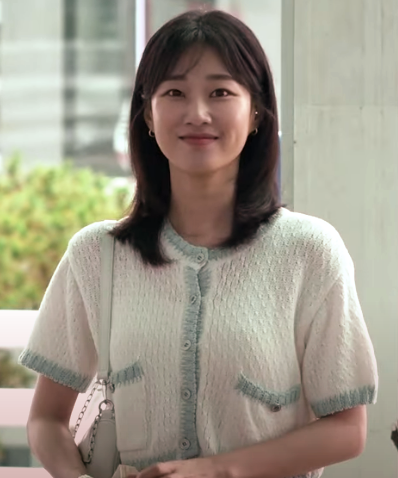
Ha Yoon-kyung

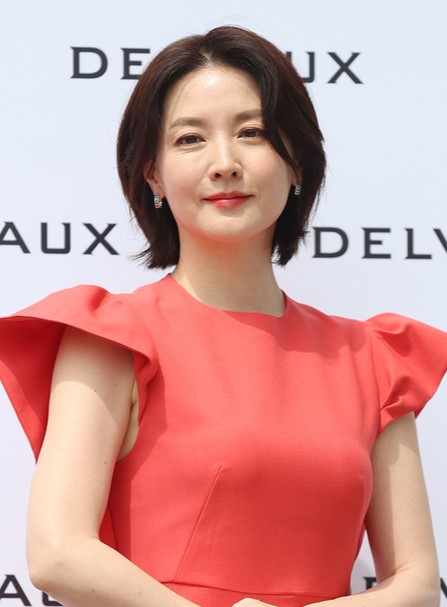
Lee Young-ae

=== Judging ===
The Directors Guild of Korea (DGK) announced the "Bechdel Choice 10" film selections, evaluating Korean theatrical releases from July 2021 to June 2022. The evaluation jury consisted of Lee Hwa-jeong, programmer for Bechdel Day 2022; Kim Dong-hyun, executive director of the Seoul Independent Film Festival; film critic Joo Sung-chul; Lee Dong-ha, CEO of Red Peter Films; and Director Lim Sun-ae.

On the same day, the DGK also announced the "Bechdel Choice 5" series selections. This evaluation covered domestic series aired or completed between July 2021 and June 2022, featuring a jury composed of Lee Hwa-jeong, programmer for Bechdel Day 2022; Jin Myung-hyun, CEO of independent film studio Movement; Na Won-jeong, reporter for the JoongAng Ilbo; and Choi Ji-eun, writer and columnist.

=== Bechdel Choice 10 ===
Bechdel Choice 10 of the Year
Film	Series
Gull; Gyeong-ah's Daughter; Ten Months; Anchor; Nothing Serious; Hommage; Missing Yoon; Perhaps Love; Snowball; Decision to Leave	Inspector Koo; Thirty-Nine; Work Later, Drink Now; The Red Sleeve; Political Fever

=== Bechdelian ===
Bechdellian of the Year
Director — Film	Director — Series
Shin Su-won – Hommage	Jung Ji-in – The Red Sleeve
Producer — Film	Producer — Series
Shin Hye-yeon; Kim Sung-hwan – The Anchor	Park Sung-hye – Inspector Koo
Screenwriter — Film	Screenwriter — Series
Chung Seo-kyung; Park Chan-wook – Decision to Leave	Yoo Young-ah – Thirty, Nine
Actress — Film	Actress — Series
Ha Yoon-kyung – Gyeong-a's Daughter	Lee Young-ae – Inspector Koo
