= KOFIC Location Incentive =

South Korean film shooting grant

The KOFIC Location Incentive program, launched in 2011 by Korean Film Council (KOFIC), covers a part of the expenses of "foreign feature films, television series and documentaries" shot in South Korea. KOFIC grants up to 30% cash rebate on "foreign audio-visual works production expenditure incurred for goods and services in Korea". The grant amount is subject to change depending on the numbers of days taken to shoot the film and the remaining grant program budget as of the date of application.

The program has been supporting many films since its launch, including, One Cut (Japanese feature film), Amour (Japanese feature film), and Taste (Chinese feature film) in 2013; Urban Games (Chinese feature film), Olympic Ransom (Japanese TV drama), and Full House (Thailand TV drama) in 2012; and Hakuji no Hito (Japanese feature film), Rainbow Rose (Japanese TV series), and On the Road (Chinese feature film) in 2011.

The number of times Western films portrayed Korea in their movies has been remarkably less than the number of times Western films portrayed either China or Japan. Also, Korea has usually been portrayed as a "faux North Korea." Through this program, the South Korean government shows willingness to change the status quo. It seeks direct economic gain through tourism and local employments. But in the long run, it also seeks to promote Korea's brand image and to increase its soft power. This will give Korea a higher position in the global society.

== Avengers: Age of Ultron ==
Marvel Studios was selected for the incentive program when shooting the sequel of The Avengers, Avengers: Age of Ultron in Korea in March 2014. 30% of the production cost was paid by the Korean government.

Up to 23 million dollars' worth of economic benefit was expected, especially in the local job market and tourism. Also, in the movie, Korea would be portrayed as a "high-tech, modern country" with "no negative light shed on the country" — a clause included in the contract between Marvel and the Korean government. Korea anticipated that this event would be the new Gangnam Style in positively adding to Korea's brand value.

== See also ==
- Film finance
