= Chang Kang-myoung =

South Korean writer

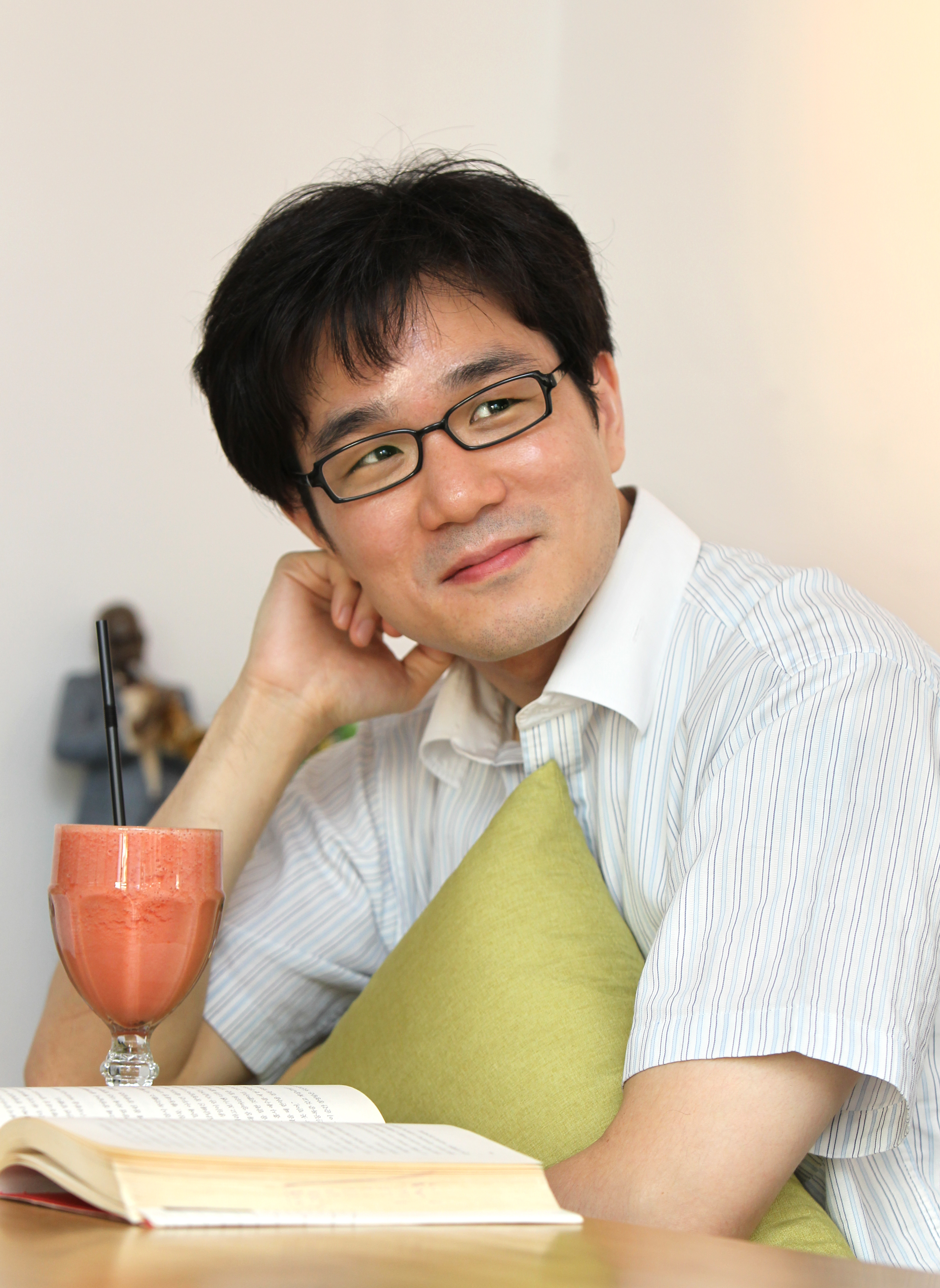
- Born: 장강명; 1975 (age 50–51); Seoul
- Education: Yonsei University
- Occupation: Writer
- Writing career
- Period: 1994 -
- Genre: Novel
- Website: Twitter; Facebook

Chang Kang-myoung (Korean: 장강명; Hanja: 張康明) is a South Korean science fiction writer.

== Life ==
Chang Kang-myoung was born in 1975 in Seoul. He graduated from Yonsei University in urban engineering and worked in a construction company, which he quit. Then he joined the Dong-a Ilbo daily and worked as a reporter for 11 years. He began his career as a writer when he was awarded the Hankyoreh Literary Award for his novel Phyobaek (표백 The bleached) in 2011. He received the Surim Literary Award in 2014 for his novel Yeolgwanggeumji, ebarodeu (열광금지, 에바로드, No enthusiasm, Eva Road); he received the Jeju 4·3 Peace Prize for his novel Daetgeulbudae (댓글부대 The comments army) in 2015; and he received the Munhakdongne Writer Award for Geumeum, ttoneun dangsini segyereul gieokhaneun bangsik (그믐, 또는 당신이 세계를 기억하는 방식 Waning crescent, or the way you remember the world). He has also written novels Homodominanseu (호모도미난스 Homodominance), Hanguki sileoseo (한국이 싫어서 Because I don’t like Korea), and a short story collection Lumière People (뤼미에르 피플). He received the Today’s Writer Award in 2016 for Daetgeulbudae (댓글부대 The comments army).

== Works ==
- Aseutatin (아스타틴 Astatine), Epiclog, 2017.
- Uriui sowoneun jeonjaeng (우리의 소원은 전쟁 Our wish is war), Wisdom House, 2016.
- Daetgeulbudae (댓글부대 The comments army), EunHaengNaMu, 2015.
- Geumeum, ttoneun dangsini segyereul gieokhaneun bangsik (그믐, 또는 당신이 세계를 기억하는 방식 Waning crescent, or the way you remember the world), Munhakdongne, 2015.
- Hanguki sileoseo (한국이 싫어서 Because I don’t like Korea), Minumsa, 2015.
- Homodominanseu (호모도미난스 Homodominance), EunHaengNaMu, 2014
- Yeolgwanggeumji, ebarodeu (열광금지, 에바로드, No enthusiasm, Eva Road), Yeonhap News, 2014.
- Lumière People (뤼미에르 피플), Hanibook, 2012.
- The Bleached (표백), Hanibook, 2011.
- Keullon peurojecteu (클론 프로젝트 The Clone Project), DongA, 1996.

=== Works in translation ===
- Parce que je déteste la Corée (French)
- Fired: K-Fiction Series 13 (English)

== Adaptation ==
In 2023, Hanguki sileoseo (한국이 싫어서 Because I don’t like Korea), has been adapted into a film of the same name by the director and screenwriter Jang Kun-jae. The film is selected as the opening film at the 28th Busan International Film Festival and will be screened on October 4, 2023.

== Awards ==
- 2016 Today’s Writer Award
- 2015 Jeju 4·3 Peace Prize
- 2015 Munhakdongne Writer Award
- 2014 Surim Literary Award
- 2011 Hankyoreh Literary Award
