= The Story of Kang-goo =

- Genre: Romance, Drama
- Written by: Baek Mi-kyung
- Directed by: Hong Sung-chang
- Starring: Lee Dong-wook; Park Joo-mi; Shin Dong-woo
- Country of origin: South Korea
- Original language: Korean
- No. of episodes: 2

Production
- Running time: Saturday & Sunday at 20:45 (KST)

Original release
- Network: Seoul Broadcasting System
- Release: March 29 – March 30, 2014

The Story of Kang-goo (Korean: 강구 이야기) is a 2014 South Korean two-part SBS romance television drama starring Lee Dong-wook, Park Joo-mi and Shin Dong-woo.

== Plot ==
The drama is narrated from the perspective of Lee Kang-gu, a middle school boy living in the seaside town of Ganggu Harbor in Yeongdeok. His single mother, Yang Moon-sook, runs a local seafood restaurant while suffering from severe diabetes, awaiting her death.

Kim Kyung-tae, a gangster from Seoul, visits the town to manage a business deal involving the purchase of Moon-sook's restaurant land. However, Kyung-tae hesitates upon realizing that Moon-sook is the older sister of Jung-soo, his late gangster friend who was stabbed to death. Feeling a deep sense of guilt and responsibility toward his deceased friend's family, Kyung-tae decides to protect and help them instead of following his organization's original plan.

As Kyung-tae stays in the town, he gradually forms a close bond with Kang-gu, becoming a father figure to the boy. At the same time, Kyung-tae and Moon-sook fall into a deep, tragic romance. Despite the constant threats from competing gang members who try to evict Moon-sook and take the land, Kyung-tae refuses to back down. Fully aware of Moon-sook's terminal illness and their precarious circumstances, the two decide to cherish their remaining time together and share a heartfelt, emotional relationship.

== Cast ==
- Lee Dong-wook as Kim Kyung-tae
- Park Joo-mi as Yang Moon-sook
- Shin Dong-woo as Lee Kang-gu

== Notes ==
The Story of Kang-goo is SBS first 3D drama in South Korea as well as the world. It was produced in dual stream with LG.
