= Bechdel Day 2024 =

Annual awards ceremony

Bechdel Day
- Native name: 벡델데이 2024
- Sponsored by: Ministry of Culture, Sports and Tourism; Korean Film Council
- Date: September 7, 2025
- Venue: KU Cinematheque, Seoul
- Country: South Korea
- Currently held by: Directors Guild of Korea (DGK)

Bechdel Day 2024 (Korean: 벡델데이 2024) was held on September 7 at the Indie Space (8th Floor, 176 Yanghwa-ro, Mapo-gu, Seoul). It marked the fifth edition of Bechdel Day, an annual South Korean awards ceremony and event hosted by the Directors Guild of Korea (DGK) and by the Ministry of Culture, Sports and Tourism and the Korean Film Council. Established in 2020, the event evaluates and honors gender equality in South Korean film and television, utilizing the Bechdel test alongside expanded criteria.

== Program ==
=== Bechdel Talk 1: Meeting the Bechdelian - An Industry in Crisis, Breakthroughs Enabled by Gender-Equality Content ===
Bechdel Day consistently highlights gender-equal content free from discrimination and marginalization, recognizing that perspective-driven media has a profound societal impact. By gathering creators who embody gender-equal values, the event examined how diverse content brings positive changes to the industry. Despite an industry climate often prioritizing scale and commercial performance, the event served as a platform to discuss the steadfast protection of gender equality values.

The session took place on September 7 from 15:00 to 16:30 at IndieSpace. It was hosted by actor Bong Tae-gyu and programmer Lee Hwa-jung, featuring a panel of awarded creators:

- Lee Ji-eun (Director, The Hill of Secrets - Film Category, Director Award)
- Kim Min-ju (Writer, A Letter from Kyoto - Film Category, Writer Award)
- Jeon Go-woon and Lim Dae-hyung (Directors, LTNS - Series Category, Director Award)
- Park Kyung-hwa (Writer, Graduation - Series Category, Writer Award)
- Baek Mi-kyung (Producer, Strong Girl Nam-soon - Series Category, Producer Award)

=== Bechdel Talk 2: Yim Soon-rye's 28 Years - A New Wave of Female Directors ===
In 1996, director Yim Soon-rye debuted with Three Friends at a time when opportunities for women in Chungmuro were severely limited. Operating in an era when it was rare for a woman to direct without going through the traditional apprenticeship system, or to helm large-scale genre films, Yim continually expanded those boundaries. Her career spans varied scales and genres, including Forever the Moment (2008), Journeys with a Sundog (2010), The Whistleblower (2014), Little Forest (2018), and The Point Men (2023). This session evaluated her creative world and its significance in carving a new path in the film industry.

The event took place on September 7 from 18:00 to 19:30 at IndieSpace. It was hosted by Cineplay Editor-in-Chief Joo Sung-chul and programmer Lee Hwa-jung, featuring Director Yim Soon-rye and Director Nam Dong-hyeop as panelists discussing how these milestones serve as a barometer for gender-equal content development.

== Winners ==
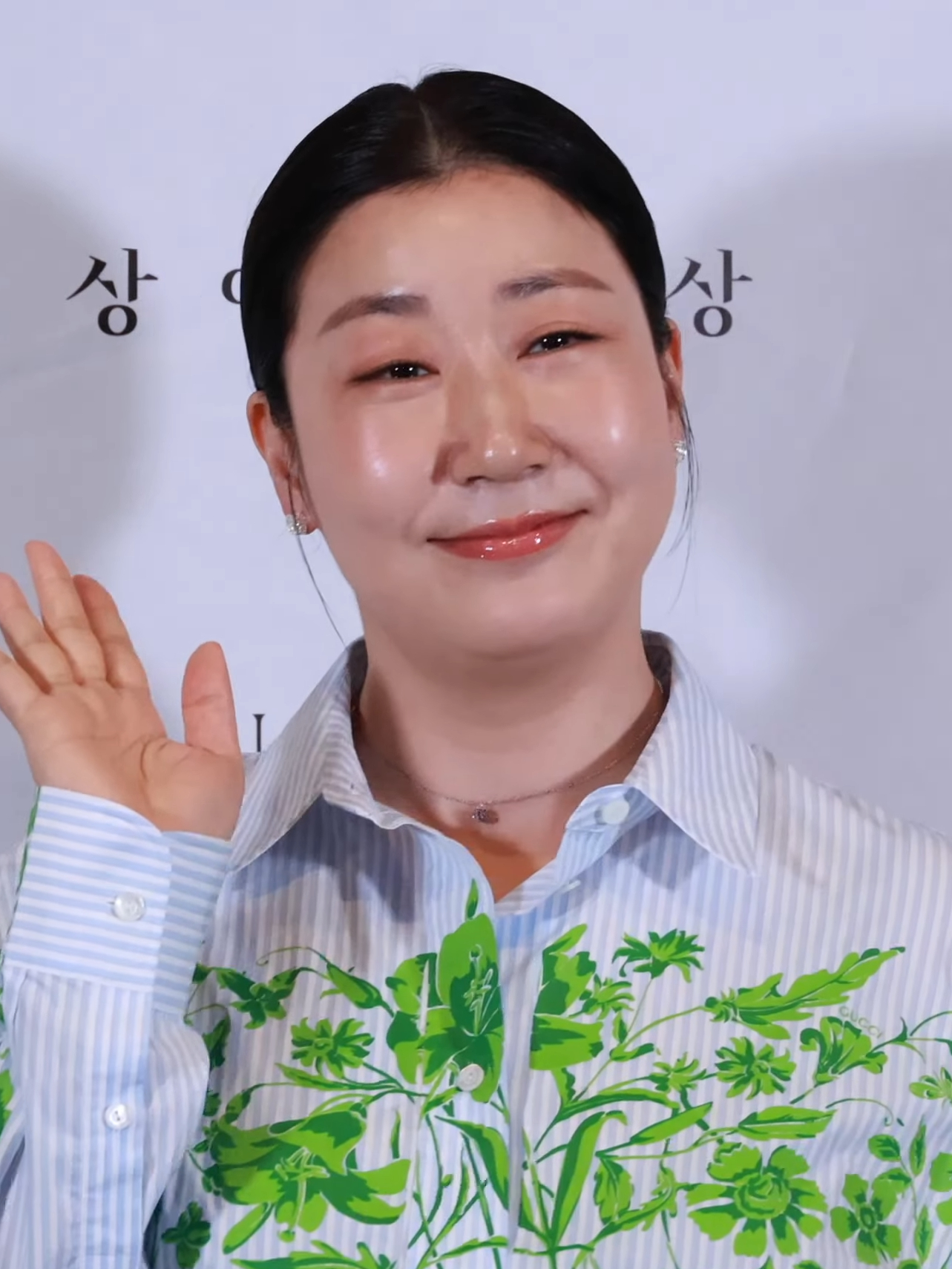
Ra Mi-ran

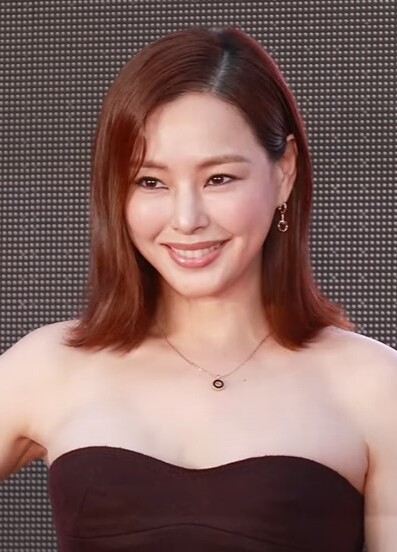
Lee Ha-nee

=== Judging ===
On August 6, 2024, the Directors Guild of Korea (DGK) announced the "Bechdel Choice 10" film selections. Ten films were chosen through preliminary and final screenings out of 108 Korean films released between July 2023 and May 2024. The final screening panel for this year's film category was led by Director Lee Eon-hee (who directed Missing, The Detective Returns, and The Killer's Shopping List, and recently participated as a creator for A Shop for Killers), alongside Moonshot Film CEO Choi Jeong-hwa, Cineplay reporter Seong Chan-eul, and film critic Son Hee-jeong.

On the same date, the DGK also announced the "Bechdel Choice 10" series selections. This category reviewed 91 series released between July 2023 and May 2024. The final judging panel for the series category included Bechdel Day programmer Lee Hwa-jung, Professor Kim Min-jung of the Department of Creative Writing at Chung-Ang University, JoongAng Ilbo reporter Na Won-jung, and Cineplay reporter Kim Ji-yeon.

=== Bechdel Choice 10 ===
Bechdel Choice 10 of the Year
Film	Series
A Letter from Kyoto; You and Me; Water Scale; Smugglers; Hill of Secrets; Picnic; Citizen of a Kind; Sleep; Jeong-sun; Long Live Hell	Not Others; Castaway Diva; Knight Flower; Tell Me That You Love Me; Daily Dose of Sunshine; A Shop for Killers; The Midnight Romance in Hagwon; Pyramid Game; Strong Girl Nam-soon; LTNS

=== Bechdelian ===
Bechdellian of the Year
Director — Film	Director — Series
Lee Ji-eun – Hill of Secrets	Jung Ji-in – The Red Sleeve
Producer — Film	Producer — Series
Kang Hye-jung – Smugglers	Baek Mi-kyung – Strong Girl Nam-soon
Screenwriter — Film	Screenwriter — Series
Kim Min-ju – A Letter from Kyoto	Park Kyung-hwa – The Midnight Romance in Hagwon
Actress — Film	Actress — Series
Ra Mi-ran – Citizen of a Kind	Lee Ha-nee – Knight Flower
