= A Letter from Kyoto =

2022 South Korean family drama film

- Main Poster
- Hangul: 교토에서 온 편지
- RR: Gyotoeseo on pyeonji
- MR: Kyot'oësŏ on p'yŏnji
- Directed by: Kim Min-ju
- Screenplay by: Kim Min-ju
- Produced by: Bae So-hyun
- Starring: Han Sun-hwa; Cha Mi-kyung; Han Chae-ah; Song Ji-hyun
- Cinematography: Kim Seon-hyeong
- Music by: Kwon Hyun-jeong
- Production company: Korean Academy of Film Arts (KAFA)
- Distributed by: M-Line Distribution
- Release dates: October 6, 2022 (BIFF); December 6, 2023 (South Korea)
- Running time: 101 minutes
- Country: South Korea
- Language: Korean
- Box office: US$44,056

A Letter from Kyoto (Korean: 교토에서 온 편지) is a 2022 South Korean independent family drama film written and directed by Kim Min-ju, and starring Han Sun-hwa, Cha Mi-kyung, Han Chae-ah, and Song Ji-hyun. The film is a project from the 15th Korean Academy of Film Arts (KAFA) Feature Film Production Research Program, which was the first to be selected for the Busan Film Commission's newly established, 2021 Made in Busan feature film production support program. The film had its world premiere at the 27th Busan International Film Festival (BIFF) on October 6, 2022. It had its theatrical release on December 6, 2023.

== Plot ==
Hwa-ja (Cha Mi-kyung) has been raising her three daughters alone in Busan after her husband passed away. One day, the middle daughter Hye-young (Han Sun-hwa) comes back to Busan after having continuous setbacks in Seoul. While spending time with her mom, she accidentally sees a letter written in Japanese, which triggers her curiosity. She starts to ask Hwa-ja about her past life and gets to know new stories of her mother that she had never heard of. Meanwhile, something inside Hwa-ja’s heart where has been buried for decades also opens up.

== Cast ==
- Han Sun-hwa as Jang Hye-young, the middle daughter
- Cha Mi-kyung as Hwa-ja, the widowed mother
- Han Chae-ah as Jang Hye-jin, the eldest daughter
- Song Ji-hyun as Jang Hye-ju, the youngest daughter

== Release ==
=== Film festivals ===
On October 6, 2022, the film had its world premiere at the 27th Busan International Film Festival: BIFF in the Korean Panorama section.

The film had its screening at various film festivals such as, Seoul Independent Film Festival: SIFF (2022) - Festival Choice, Independent Film Festival Busan (2023), London Korean Film Festival (2023) - Korea Season, Frankfurt Korean Film Festival (2024), and also won two awards at the Vesoul International Film Festival of Asian Cinema (2023) - Feature Film Competition in France and the Best Screenplay Award at the Imagine India International Film Festival: IIIFF (2023) - WOMEN'S VOICES in Spain.

=== Theatrical release ===
It was released theatrically on December 6, 2023, in South Korea by M-Line Distribution.

=== Home media ===
The film was made available for streaming on IPTV (KT Genie tv, SK Btv, LG U+ TV), Home Choice, U+ Mobile tv, Skylife, Wavve, Naver Series On, Google Play, Watcha theaters (individual purchase), and Coupang Play (individual purchase) from December 28, 2023.

== Box Office ==
The film was released on 66 screens on December 6, 2023.

According to the Korean Box Office Information System (KOBIS), as of July 30, 2025, the film's total gross is US$44,056 from 7,423 admissions in the Korean Specialty Film category.

== Accolades ==
Award ceremony	Year	Category	Nominee	Result	Ref.
Bechdel Day	2024	Bechdel Choice 10 — Film	A Letter from Kyoto	Won	
Bechdel Day	2024	Bechdelian in film — Writer of the Year	Kim Min-ju	Won	
Imagine India International Film Festival	2023	Best Screenplay	Kim Min-ju	Won	
Vesoul International Film Festival of Asian Cinema	2023	INALCO Jury Award- Special Mention	A Letter from Kyoto	Won	
Vesoul International Film Festival of Asian Cinema	2023	International Jury Award	A Letter from Kyoto	Won	
