= Choi Jae-rim =

South Korean musical actor (born 1985)

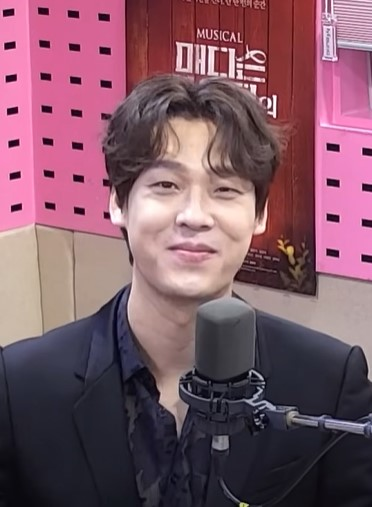
- Choi in 2025
- Born: April 29, 1985 (age 41); Suwon, Gyeonggi Province, South Korea
- Other name: Zev Choi
- Education: Kyungwon University; Korea National University of Arts
- Occupations: Actor; singer
- Height: 188 cm (6 ft 2 in)
- Musical career
- Genre: Musical Theatre
- Years active: 2009–present
- Label: For Kyyks

Korean name
- Hangul: 최재림
- Hanja: 崔載林
- RR: Choe Jaerim
- MR: Ch'oe Chaerim
- Website: zevchoi.com

Choi Jae-rim (Korean: 최재림; born on April 29, 1985) is a South Korean musical theatre actor. Since making his professional debut in 2009 as Tom Collins in Rent, he has portrayed a wide range of iconic roles, including Gabe in Next to Normal, Judas Iscariot in Jesus Christ Superstar, Lola in Kinky Boots, Gringoire in Notre-Dame de Paris, Billy Flynn in Chicago, Miss Trunchbull in Matilda the Musical, Radames in Aida, the Phantom in The Phantom of the Opera, and Jean Valjean in Les Misérables. Known for his powerful vocals, precise diction, and commanding stage presence, Choi is regarded as one of the leading figures in contemporary Korean musical theatre.

He has received multiple accolades, including the Korea Musical Award for Best Actor for his performance as Miss Trunchbull in Matilda the Musical (2019), and Best Supporting Actor for his role as Billy Flynn in Chicago (2022).

On television, Choi has played Jung Jae-woong in Green Mothers' Club (2022), Kim Yoon-beom in Lies Hidden in My Garden (2023), and Kwon Seong-soo in A Virtuous Business (2024).

In addition to his work on stage and television, he has appeared on two televised singing competition shows: The King of Masked Singers (Korean: 미스터리 음악쇼 복면가왕; aired on MBC in 2020), where he became the 41st "King of Masked Singer", and Lotto Singer (Korean: 로또싱어; aired on MBN in 2020–2021), which he won after competing against 44 other professional singers.

== Early life ==
Choi Jae-rim was born on April 29, 1985, in Suwon, South Korea, while his father was serving as a fighter pilot at Suwon Air Base. His father, Choi Mi-rak, is a retired two-star major general in the Republic of Korea Air Force. Because of his father's military career, Choi's family moved frequently. During his childhood, Choi lived in Suwon, Osan, and Cheongju, where major Air Force bases are located. He also spent about a year in Montgomery, Alabama, in the United States, near Maxwell Air Force Base. The family later relocated to Gyeryong, home to the Republic of Korea Air Force Headquarters, where Choi spent most of his youth.

Choi attended Yongnam Elementary School, Yongnam Middle School, and Yongnam High School, institutions primarily serving children from military families. He later recalled being particularly mindful of his conduct at school, as he feared that any misbehavior might reflect poorly on his father.

Raised in a devout Catholic family, Choi regularly attended church and sang in the church choir with his older brother. His involvement in church choir, alongside his mother's encouragement, influenced his decision to pursue music in higher education. He began formal vocal training during his junior year of high school and was subsequently admitted to Kyungwon University as a classical voice major, later graduating as valedictorian.

While in college, Choi completed his mandatory military service in the Republic of Korea Air Force Band as a member of the military chorus. One of his fellow chorus members was a musical theatre actor, and their long conversations sparked Choi's interest in musical theatre. After completing his service, he sought professional training and auditioned for vocal instruction at Kolleen Park’s Kyyk Musical Academy. When he was being evaluated, the audition for the 2009 Korean production of Rent was taking place in the same building. Park and members of the production staff heard Choi singing "This Is the Moment" from Jekyll & Hyde and, impressed by his powerful voice, cast him as Tom Collins despite his lack of musical-theatre experience. The role became his professional stage debut and brought him early recognition in the South Korean musical theatre community.

== Stage ==
=== Musical ===
| Year | Production | Role | Venue | Dates | Notes |
|---|---|---|---|---|---|
| 2009 | Rent | Tom Collins | KEPCO Art Center | January 9 – March 29, 2009 | Stage debut |
| 2009 | Hairspray | Seaweed | KEPCO Art Center | November 28, 2009 – February 2, 2010 | |
| 2010 | The Fortress (Korean: 남한산성) | Jeong Myeong-su (Korean: 정명수) | Seongnam Arts Center Opera House | September 30 – October 17, 2010 | |
| 2011 | Spring Awakening | Georg | Doosan Art Center Yonkang Hall | June 3 – September 4, 2011 | |
| 2011 | Next to Normal | Gabe | Doosan Art Center Yonkang Hall | November 18, 2011 – February 12, 2012 | Original Korean cast |
| 2012 | Visitor | Guest / Hunter / Bar owner | Miarigogae Arts Theater | September 7–28, 2012 | Original cast |
| 2012 | Visitor | Guest / Hunter / Bar owner | Daehakro Arts Theater Namu and Mul | October 5–25, 2012 | |
| 2012 | Assassins | Lee Harvey Oswald / The Balladeer | Doosan Art Center Yonkang Hall | November 20 – February 3, 2013 | |
| 2015 | The Twelve Songs of Gaya (Korean: 가야십이지곡) | Ureuk (Korean: 우륵) | Art One Theater Hall 2 | January 24 – February 1, 2015 | Original cast |
| 2015 | Jesus Christ Superstar | Judas Iscariot & Jesus (3 performances by special request) | Charlotte Theater | June 7 – September 13, 2015 | |
| 2015 | See What I Wanna See | The Thief / Reporter | SEEYA the Project Box | October 30 – November 15, 2015 | |
| 2015 | Next to Normal | Gabe | Doosan Art Center Yonkang Hall | December 16, 2015 – March 13, 2016 | |
| 2016 | Airport Baby | Josh Cohen | Art One Theater Hall 1 | February 23 – March 6, 2016 | Original cast |
| 2016 | Edgar Allan Poe | Edgar Allan Poe | Kwanglim Arts Center BBCH Hall | May 26 – July 24, 2016 | Original cast |
| 2016 | Trace U | Lee Woo Bin (Korean: 이우빈) | Art One Theater Hall 1 | August 3 – September 25, 2016 | |
| 2016 | See What I Wanna See | The Thief / Reporter | Hongik University Daehangno Arts Center Small Theater | September 27 – November 20, 2016 | |
| 2017 | Airport Baby | Josh Cohen | Dream Art Center Hall 1 | October 17, 2017 – January 14, 2018 | |
| 2018 | Kinky Boots | Lola | Blue Square Interpark Hall | January 31 – April 1, 2018 | |
| 2018 | Notre-Dame de Paris | Gringoire | Sejong Center Grand Theater | June 8 – August 5, 2018 | |
| 2018 | Matilda the Musical | Miss Trunchbull | LG Arts Center | September 8, 2018 – February 10, 2019 | Original Korean cast |
| 2019 | City of Angels | Stine | Chungmu Arts Center Grand Theater | August 7 – October 20, 2019 | Original Korean cast |
| 2019 | Aida | Radames | Blue Square Interpark Hall | November 16, 2019 – February 23, 2020 | |
| 2020 | Rent | Tom Collins | D-cube Arts Center | June 13 – August 22, 2020 | |
| 2020 | Kinky Boots | Lola | Blue Square Interpark Hall | August 21 – November 1, 2020 | |
| 2020 | Airport Baby | Josh Cohen | Shinhan Card FAN Square Live Hall | November 11, 2020 – January 31, 2021 | |
| 2020 | A Gentleman's Guide to Love and Murder | The D'Ysquith Family | Hongik University Daehangno Arts Center Grand Theater | November 20, 2020 – March 1, 2021 | |
| 2021 | Chicago | Billy Flynn | Daesung D-cube Arts Center | April 2 – July 18, 2021 | |
| 2021 | Hadestown | Hermes | LG Arts Center | September 7, 2021 – February 27, 2022 | Original Korean cast |
| 2022 | Something Rotten! | William Shakespeare | Universal Arts Center | February 17 – April 10, 2022 | |
| 2022 | Aida | Radames | Blue Square Shinhan Card Hall | May 17 – August 10, 2022 | |
| 2022 | Kinky Boots | Lola | Chungmu Arts Center Grand Theater | July 20 – October 23, 2022 | |
| 2022 | Matilda the Musical | Miss Trunchbull | Daesung D-Cube Arts Center | October 5, 2022 – February 26, 2023 | |
| 2023 | The Phantom of the Opera | The Phantom of the Opera | Charlotte Theater | August 11 – November 17, 2023 | |
| 2023 | The Phantom of the Opera | The Phantom of the Opera | Keimyung Arts Center (Daegu, Korea) | December 22, 2023 – February 4, 2024 | |
| 2023 | Les Misérables | Jean Valjean | Dream Theater (Busan, Korea) | October 15 – November 19, 2023 | |
| 2023 | Les Misérables | Jean Valjean | Blue Square Shinhan Card Hall | November 30, 2023 – March 10, 2024 | |
| 2024 | The Last Five Years | Jamie Wellerstein | Sejong Center S Theater | January 17 – April 7, 2024 | |
| 2024 | Chicago | Billy Flynn | D-cube Link Arts Center | June 7 – September 29, 2024 | |
| 2024 | Hadestown | Hermes | Charlotte Theater | August 13 – October 6, 2024 | |
| 2024 | Hadestown | Hermes | Dream Theater (Busan, Korea) | October 18 – November 3, 2024 | |
| 2024 | Kinky Boots | Lola | Blue Square Shinhan Card Hall | October 1 – November 10, 2024 | |
| 2024 | Cyrano de Bergerac | Cyrano de Bergerac | Seoul Arts Center CJ Towol Theater | December 4, 2024 – February 23, 2025 | |
| 2025 | Jekyll & Hyde | Dr. Henry Jekyll / Mr. Edward Hyde | Blue Square Shinhan Card Hall | March 1 – May 18, 2025 | |
| 2025 | The Bridges of Madison County | Robert Kincaid | Kwanglim Arts Center BBCH Hall | May 1 – July 13, 2025 | |
| 2026 | Yumi's Cells | Cell 109 | Seoul Arts Center CJ Towol Theater | June 30 – August 23, 2026 | Original cast |
| 2026 | Peach Blossoms: A Promise Kept Beyond Sorrow | Crown Prince Sado | Yungneung | October 17 – 18 & 24 – 25, 2026 | |
| 2026 | The Phantom of the Opera | The Phantom of the Opera | Blue Square Woori Bank Hall | December 22, 2026 – February 28, 2027 | |

=== Opera ===
| Year | Production | Role | Venue | Dates | Notes |
|---|---|---|---|---|---|
| 2014 | Rita | Gaspar | Chungmu Arts Center Theater Black | November 8–9, 2014 | Original Korean cast |
| 2015 | Rita | Gaspar | Chungmu Arts Center Theater Black | November 11–15, 2015 | |
| 2016 | Rita | Gaspar | Chungmu Arts Center Theater Black | October 28 – November 6, 2016 | |

=== Play ===
| Year | Production | Role | Venue | Dates | Notes |
|---|---|---|---|---|---|
| 2017 | Guards at the Taj | Humayun | Daemyung Culture Factory Lifeway Hall | August 1 – October 15, 2017 | Original Korean cast |
| 2025 | Guards at the Taj | Humayun | LG Art Center Seoul U+ Stage | November 12, 2025 - January 4, 2026 | |

== Filmography ==
=== Television series ===
Television series appearances
| Year | Title | Role | Notes | Ref. |
|---|---|---|---|---|
| 2022 | Green Mothers' Club | Jung Jae-woong | Small screen debut | |
| 2023 | Lies Hidden in My Garden | Kim Yoon-beom | | |
| 2024 | A Virtuous Business | Kwon Seong-soo | | |
| 2026 | The East Palace | Royal guard | | |

=== Television shows ===
Television shows appearances
| Year | Title | Role | Notes | Ref. |
|---|---|---|---|---|
| 2010 | Qualifications of Men | Choir Audition Judge / Vocal Trainer | | |
| 2020 | The King of Masked Singers | Contestant | Won and became the 41st "King of Masked Singers" | |
| 2020–2021 | Lotto Singer | Contestant | Winner | |

== Awards and nominations ==
| Year | Award | Category | Nominated work | Result |
|---|---|---|---|---|
| 2018 | The 6th Korea Art and Culture Awards | Best Musical Theatre Actor | | Won |
| 2019 | The 3rd Korea Musical Awards | Best Actor | Matilda the Musical | Won |
| 2021 | The 5th Korea Musical Awards | Best Actor | Airport Baby | Nominated |
| 2022 | The 6th Korea Musical Awards | Best Supporting Actor | Chicago | Won |
| 2022 | The 16th Daegu International Musical Festival (DIMF) Awards | Star of the Year | Chicago | Won |
| 2023 | The 7th Korea Musical Awards | Best Supporting Actor | Something Rotten! | Nominated |
| 2024 | The 8th Korea Musical Awards | Best Actor | The Phantom of the Opera | Nominated |
| 2024 | The 18th Daegu International Musical Festival (DIMF) Awards | Star of the Year | The Phantom of the Opera & Les Misérables | Won |
| 2024 | The 15th Korean Popular Culture and Arts Awards | Prime Minister's Commendation | | Won |
| 2025 | The 18th NOL Ticket Golden Ticket Awards | Best Actor in a Musical | | Won |
