= Victory (2024 film) =

2024 South Korean film by Park Beom-soo

- Theatrical release poster
- Hangul: 빅토리
- Lit.: Victory
- RR: Biktori
- MR: Pikt'ori
- Directed by: Park Beom-soo
- Written by: Park Beom-soo; Park Sung-hoon; Kang Min-seon
- Produced by: Bae Seon-hye
- Starring: Lee Hye-ri; Park Se-wan; Lee Jung-ha; Jo Aram
- Cinematography: Park Jung-hoon
- Edited by: Heo Seon-mi
- Music by: Kim Dong-wook
- Production company: Annapurna Films
- Distributed by: Mindmark
- Release dates: July 12, 2024 (NYAFF); August 14, 2024
- Running time: 120 minutes
- Country: South Korea
- Language: Korean
- Box office: US$3.3 million

Victory (Korean: 빅토리) is a 2024 South Korean musical drama film directed by Park Beom-soo, starring Lee Hye-ri, Park Se-wan, Lee Jung-ha, and Jo Aram. It follows the passionate journey of a dance duo, Pil-sun and Mi-na, from Geoje, who form a cheerleading club called "Millennium Girls".

The film premiered on July 12, 2024 at the New York Asian Film Festival. It was released theatrically on August 14, 2024.

== Plot ==
In 1999, dance duo Pil-sun and Mi-na from Geoje team up with cheerleader Se-hyeon, who has just transferred from Seoul, to create a cheerleading club and set up a dance practice room. Together with seven other members, they form the "Millennium Girls". They have to lead Chi-hyung and the struggling Geoje Commercial High School soccer team, known for always finishing last, to victory.

== Cast ==
- Lee Hye-ri as Chu Pil-sun
- Park Se-wan as Jang Mi-na
- Lee Jung-ha as Yoon Chi-hyung
- Jo Aram as Kim Se-hyeon
- Choi Ji-su as Bae So-hee
- Baek Ha-i as Jeong Sun-jeong
- Kwon Yu-na as Kwon Yong-soon
- Yeom Ji-young as Yeom Sang-mi
- Lee Han-joo as Go Yu-ri
- Park Hyo-eun as Bang Ji-hye
- Ji Yi-soo as Hyundai Jungang High School cheerleader
- Lee Chan-hyeong as Kim Dong-hyun
- Han Jong-hoon as Kim Hyung-woo
- Cha Joo-wan as Cheon Jin-tak

== Production ==
=== Filming ===
Principal photography began in March 2023 and ended in July 2023.

== Reception ==
=== Box office ===
As of August 23, 2024, Victory has grossed $1.7 million with a running total of 249,990 tickets sold.

=== Accolades ===
Award ceremony	Year	Category	Nominee / Work	Result	Ref.
Bechdel Day	2025	Bechdel Choice 10 — Film	Victory	Won	
Bechdel Day	2025	Bechdelian in film — Producer of the Year	Lee An-na	Won	
Baeksang Arts Awards	2025	Best New Actress	Lee Hye-ri	Nominated	
Buil Film Awards	2025	Best New Actress	Lee Hye-ri	Pending	
Buil Film Awards	2025	Best New Actress	Jo Aram	Pending	
