= The Lady in Dignity =

2017 South Korean television series

- Promotional poster
- Also known as: Lady with Class
- Hangul: 품위있는 그녀
- Hanja: 品位있는 그女
- Lit.: Woman of Dignity
- RR: Pumwiinneun geunyeo
- MR: P'umwiinnŭn kŭnyŏ
- Genre: Drama; Mystery; Thriller
- Written by: Baek Mi-kyung
- Directed by: Kim Yoon-chul
- Starring: Kim Hee-sun; Kim Sun-ah; Jung Sang-hoon; Lee Tae-im; Lee Ki-woo
- Country of origin: South Korea
- Original language: Korean
- No. of episodes: 20

Production
- Executive producers: Jo Joon-hyung; Lee Jin-suk; Park Joon-seo
- Producers: Jang Min-ae; Kim So-jung; Na Ye-seu-ran
- Running time: 60 minutes
- Production companies: JS Pictures; Drama House

Original release
- Network: JTBC
- Release: June 16 – August 19, 2017

The Lady in Dignity (Korean: 품위있는 그녀) is a South Korean television series starring Kim Hee-sun, Kim Sun-ah, Jung Sang-hoon with Lee Tae-im and Lee Ki-woo. The series aired on cable network JTBC on Fridays and Saturdays at 23:00 (KST) time slot from June 16 to August 19, 2017. It became one of the highest-rated Korean dramas in cable television history.

== Synopsis ==
The story of an elegant Cheongdam-dong woman named Woo Ah-jin (Kim Hee-sun), who relished a life of luxury by marrying a quasi-chaebol son, until Park Bok-ja (Kim Sun-ah) walks into her life.

== Cast ==
=== Main ===
- Kim Hee-sun as Woo Ah-jin

A cheerful, elegant and charismatic woman who married into a rich family, but hit rock bottom after her husband's betrayal.

- Kim Sun-a as Park Bok-ja

A cool and unfazeable woman who climbs her way up the social totem pole despite coming from a small village.

- Jung Sang-hoon as Ahn Jae-suk

Youngest son of Ahn Tae-dong and also Ah-jin's cheating husband.

- Lee Tae-im as Yoon Sung-hee

Ji-hoo's sexy art teacher who is overwhelmed with greed for fame and honor. She betrays Ah-jin who helped her into the art world and cheats with her husband Jae-suk.

- Lee Ki-woo as Kang Ki-ho

A coma patient turned lawyer. He had feeling toward Ah-jin and willing to help her either with her father-in-law's business or her divorce process

=== Supporting ===
==== People around Ah-jin ====
- Yoo Seo-jin as Cha Ki-ok
- Lee Hee-jin as Kim Hyo-joo
- Jung Da-hye as Oh Kyung-hee
- Oh Yeon-ah as Baek Joo-kyung
- Moon Hee-kyung as Mrs. Geum, Ah-Jin's mother
- Choi Yoon-so as Heo Jin-hee, Ah-jin's assistant

==== People around Jae-suk ====
- Kim Yong-gun as Ahn Tae-dong, Jae-suk's father
- Seo Jeong-yeon as Park Joo-mi, Ahn Jae-goo's wife
- Han Jae-young as Ahn Jae-goo, Jae-suk's brother
- Oh Na-ra as Ahn Jae-hee, Jae-suk's sister
- Yoon Sa-bong as Yoon-su,
- Lee Chae-mi as Ahn Ji-hoo, Ah-jin and Jae-suk's daughter
- Lee Geon-woo as Ahn Woon-kyu, Park Joo-mi and Ahn Jae-goo's son

=== Extended ===
- Song Young-gyu as Jang Sung-soo, a plastic surgeon
- Kim Bub-rae as Seo Moon-tak, who owns a hotel group
- Chae Dong-hyun as Kim Bong-shik, Kyung Hee's husband
- Hwang Hyo-eun as Chun Bang-soon, a friend of Park Bok-Ja
- Jo Sung-yoon as Goo Bong-chul, a personal trainer
- Lee Jung-eun as Gook Sun-young, Ki Ho's secretary
- Song Tae-yoon as Choi Ki-seok, Hyo-Joo's boyfriend
- Seo Kyung-hwa as Mrs. Jo, the housekeeper
- Yoon Ye-in as Kyung San-daek
- So Hee-jung as Oh Poong-sook, a restaurant owner
- Park Jin-woo as Mr. Park, Head of Department
- Lee Young-hoon as Mr. Kim, the lawyer
- Lee Kan-hee as Madam Kwak
- Kim Sun-bin as Han Min-ki
- Baek Seung-hoon as Bodyguard
- Baek Bo-ram as Se-hee
- Jeon Soo-kyeong as Director Seo
- Jun Hun-tae as Detective Lee
- Park Hoon

=== Special appearances ===
- Ryu Seung-soo as Ah-jin's father
- Jung Yu-mi as Client (Episode 6)
- Yoon So-yi as Fishmonger (Episode 20)

== Original soundtrack ==
The Lady in Dignity OST

Soundtrack album by Various artists
- Released: 2017
- Genre: Soundtrack
- Languages: Korean, English
- Labels: Poong Entertainment; Warner Music Korea Ltd.

=== Part 1 ===
No.	Title	Lyrics	Music	Artist	Length
1.	"When the Cold Wind Blows" (찬바람이 불면)	E-QLO	E-QLO; B.O.K	Ivy	04:57
2.	"When the Cold Wind Blows" (Inst.)		E-QLO; B.O.K		04:57
Total length:					09:54

=== Part 2 ===
No.	Title	Lyrics	Music	Artist	Length
1.	"Fly with the Wind" (돌려놔)	Kun-yo	Kun-yo; Yudam; Lee Won-suk; Lee Seong-hyun	Navi, Lina	03:37
2.	"Fly with the Wind" (Inst.)		Kun-yo; Yudam; Lee Won-suk; Lee Seong-hyun		03:37
Total length:					07:14

=== Part 3 ===
No.	Title	Lyrics	Music	Artist	Length
1.	"Only Love You" (너만 사랑하다가)	Han Sang-won; The Brothers	Han Sang-won	The Brothers	03:36
2.	"Only Love You" (Inst.)		Han Sang-won		03:36
Total length:					07:12

=== Part 4 ===
No.	Title	Lyrics	Music	Artist	Length
1.	"Don't Want To Believe" (믿고 싶지 않아)	Blueblack	Jion	Lee Si-eun	03:58
2.	"Don't Want To Believe" (Inst.)		Jion		03:58
Total length:					07:56

=== Part 5 ===
No.	Title	Lyrics	Music	Artist	Length
1.	"I Miss You" (보고싶어)	Oh Sung-hwan; Jung Young-a	Oh Sung-hwan; Jung Young-a	Kim Seong-ri	03:46
2.	"I Miss You" (Inst.)		Oh Sung-hwan; Jung Young-a		03:46
Total length:					07:32

=== Part 6 ===
No.	Title	Lyrics	Music	Artist	Length
1.	"Drunken Night (Drama ver.)" (보고싶어)	Norwegian Wood; Kun-yo	Norwegian Wood; Kang Seung-hyun; Blue Mangtto; Rubatov	Norwegian Wood	03:38
Total length:					03:38

=== Part 7 ===
No.	Title	Artist	Length
1.	"Anything"	B.Heart	03:15
2.	"Anything" (Inst.)		03:15
Total length:			06:30

=== Part 8 ===
No.	Title	Lyrics	Music	Artist	Length
1.	"Why" (왜)	E-QLO; B.O.K	E-QLO; B.O.K	The NuTs	04:04
2.	"Why" (Inst.)		E-QLO; B.O.K		04:04
Total length:					08:08

=== Part 9 ===
No.	Title	Lyrics	Music	Artist	Length
1.	"Anding"	E-QLO; B.O.K; Stephanie	E-QLO; B.O.K; Sui.Jay	Stephanie	03:49
2.	"Anding" (Inst.)		E-QLO; B.O.K; Sui.Jay		03:49
Total length:					07:38

== Reception ==
The Lady in Dignity is one of JTBC's highest rated drama with a single episode rating of 12.065%. Culture critic Jung Duk-hyun says that the drama is not just a soap opera about couples' affairs, but a "social drama" where the two women's confrontation symbolizes the power and class structures of the society.

Due to its popularity, JTBC did a rerun of the series from October 2–6, 2017 with four-episode marathon per day starting from 7:00 (KST).

== Ratings ==
In this table, the blue numbers represent the lowest ratings and the red numbers represent the highest ratings.

Ep.	Original broadcast date	Title	Average audience share		
Ep.	Original broadcast date	Title	AGB Nielsen		TNmS
Ep.	Original broadcast date	Title	Nationwide	Seoul	Nationwide
1	June 16, 2017	A Life With a Great View (전망 종은 인생)	2.044%	2.435%	2.2%
2	June 17, 2017	Matisse & Kandinsky (마티스와 칸딘스키)	3.108%	3.126%	2.5%
3	June 23, 2017	Dangerous Gossip (위험한 가십)	2.871%	3.273%	2.8%
4	June 24, 2017	Choice and Secret (선택과 비밀)	3.285%	3.149%	3.8%
5	June 30, 2017	Greed, With Love (탐욕은 사랑을 타고)	3.609%	3.658%	2.6%
6	July 1, 2017	Night Before the Storm (폭풍전야)	4.518%	5.250%	3.5%
7	July 7, 2017	Triangle (드라이앵글)	4.091%	4.346%	2.4%
8	July 8, 2017	The Glass Ceiling and The Glass Floor (유리천장과 유리바닥)	5.795%	6.285%	5.9%
9	July 14, 2017	Prologue of War (전쟁의 서막)	5.010%	5.196%	4.2%
10	July 15, 2017	The Last Brunch (마지막 브런치)	6.899%	7.326%	7.6%
11	July 21, 2017	Twisted Fate (억갈린 운명)	8.476%	9.062%	8.0%
12	July 22, 2017	Charm of Mutual Benefit (상생의 묘미)	8.944%	9.493%	8.3%
13	July 28, 2017	Show Me the Money (쇼 미 더 머니)	6.773%	7.068%	6.0%
14	July 29, 2017	Timing (타이밍)	9.131%	9.575%	8.5%
15	August 4, 2017	The Suspects (용의자들)	7.398%	8.089%	6.6%
16	August 5, 2017	Unpredictable Future (예측불허)	9.986%	10.364%	9.9%
17	August 11, 2017	Just Like Her (그 녀 처럼)	8.430%	8.982%	7.7%
18	August 12, 2017	The Point of No Return (돌아올 수 없는 지점)	9.748%	10.250%	9.2%
19	August 18, 2017	Nobody Knows (아무도 모른다)	9.694%	9.953%	7.2%
20	August 19, 2017	Curtain Call (커튼콜)	12.065%	12.692%	10.9%
Average			6.594%	6.979%	6.0%

- This drama airs on a cable channel/pay TV which normally has a relatively smaller audience compared to free-to-air TV/public broadcasters (KBS, SBS, MBC and EBS).

== Awards and nominations ==
Year	Award	Category	Recipient	Result	Ref.
2017	10th Korea Drama Awards	Excellence Award, Actor	Lee Ki-woo	Nominated	
2017	10th Korea Drama Awards	Hot Star Award	Lee Tae-im	Won	
2017	1st The Seoul Awards	Best Drama	The Lady in Dignity	Nominated	
2017	1st The Seoul Awards	Best Actress	Kim Hee-sun	Nominated	
2017	1st The Seoul Awards	Best Supporting Actor	Jung Sang-hoon	Won	
2017	1st The Seoul Awards	Best Supporting Actress	Seo Jeong-yeon	Nominated	
2017	2nd Asia Artist Awards	Grand Prize (Daesang)	Kim Hee-sun	Won	
2018	54th Baeksang Arts Awards	Best Director	Kim Yoon-chul	Won	
2018	54th Baeksang Arts Awards	Best Actress	Kim Hee-sun	Nominated	
2018	54th Baeksang Arts Awards	Best Actress	Kim Sun-a	Nominated	
2018	54th Baeksang Arts Awards	Best Screenplay	Baek Mi-kyung	Nominated	
2018	54th Baeksang Arts Awards	Best Supporting Actor	Jung Sang-hoon	Nominated	
