= Lies Hidden in My Garden =

2023 South Korean television series

- Promotional poster
- Hangul: 마당이 있는 집
- Lit.: House with a Yard
- RR: Madangi inneun jip
- MR: Madangi innŭn chip
- Genre: Suspense thriller; Mystery
- Based on: House with a Yard by Kim Jin-young
- Written by: Gianni
- Directed by: Jung Ji-hyun; Heo Seok-won
- Starring: Kim Tae-hee; Lim Ji-yeon; Kim Sung-oh; Choi Jae-rim
- Music by: Lim Ha-young
- Country of origin: South Korea
- Original language: Korean
- No. of episodes: 8

Production
- Executive producer: Han Sang-jae (CP)
- Producers: Kim Young-gyu; Kim Je-hyun; Jang So-jeong; Kim Ho-ryong; Kim Ha-na
- Running time: 60 minutes
- Production companies: Studio Dragon; Film Dorothy

Original release
- Network: ENA
- Release: June 19 – July 11, 2023

Lies Hidden in My Garden (Korean: 마당이 있는 집) is a 2023 South Korean television series starring Kim Tae-hee, Lim Ji-yeon, Kim Sung-oh, and Choi Jae-rim. Based on the novel of the same name by Kim Jin-young, it is about two women who live completely different lives. It is an original drama of Genie TV, and is available for streaming on its platform, on Hulu Japan, on iQIYI in Taiwan, and on Netflix, Amazon Prime Video, and Viki in selected regions. It also aired on ENA from June 19 to July 11, 2023, every Monday and Tuesday at 22:00 (KST).

== Synopsis ==
The series follows the story of a woman named Moon Joo-ran (Kim Tae-hee) whose perfectly crafted life gets disturbed by a strange smell in her backyard.

== Cast ==
=== Main ===
- Kim Tae-hee as Moon Joo-ran: a housewife who has a picturesque life in a perfect house and is the envy of everyone around her.
- Lim Ji-yeon as Chu Sang-eun: a pregnant woman who is a victim of domestic violence and dreams of escaping from her pitiful reality.
- Kim Sung-oh as Park Jae-ho: Joo-ran's husband who is a perfectionist doctor.
- Choi Jae-rim as Kim Yoon-beom: Sang-eun's husband who works as a salesman at a pharmaceutical company.

=== Supporting ===
- Cha Seong-je as Park Seung-jae: Joo-ran and Jae-ho's son.
- Jung Woon-sun as Oh Hae-soo: Joo-ran and Jae-ho's neighbor.
- Jung Hee-tae as Do-kyung: a police officer.
- Cha Mi-kyung as Sang-eun's mother who has dementia.
- Woo Hyun as a security guard at the apartment where Sang-eun lives.
- Yoon Ga-i as Lee Su-min
- Moon Soo-young as Joo Tae-kyung: a child prostitution broker.

== Reception ==
=== Ranking ===
In Amazon Prime Video's Top TV Show category, Lies Hidden in My Garden ranked first in five countries in Indonesia, Philippines, Singapore, Vietnam, and Myanmar, as well as in the top 10 in nine Southeast Asian countries. According to Netflix's official tally, the series ranked 8th in Global Top 10 non-English TV shows from June 19–25, 2023, and ranked 9th from June 26 to July 2, 2023.

Lies Hidden in My Garden ranked in the top 5 of Viki's viewing user rankings in fifty countries including Australia, New Zealand, United Kingdom, and France. In its second week of release, the series continued its popularity by ranking in the top 5 in twenty-one countries, and succeeded in entering the top 5 for three consecutive weeks in the United States and Canada. It also attracted attention by enjoying high popularity in the Middle East, such as the United Arab Emirates and Saudi Arabia.

=== Viewership ===
Lies Hidden in My Garden : South Korea viewers per episode (thousands)

Season	Episode number								Average
Season	1	2	3	4	5	6	7	8	Average
1	226	283	433	519	378	458	437	577	414

Source: Audience measurement performed nationwide by Nielsen Korea.

Average TV viewership ratings
Ep.	Original broadcast date	Average audience share (Nielsen Korea)	
Ep.	Original broadcast date	Nationwide	Seoul
1	June 19, 2023	1.195% (5th)	1.233% (6th)
2	June 20, 2023	1.249% (5th)	1.189% (5th)
3	June 26, 2023	1.940% (3rd)	2.419% (3rd)
4	June 27, 2023	2.553% (3rd)	3.002% (3rd)
5	July 3, 2023	1.972% (3rd)	2.227% (2nd)
6	July 4, 2023	2.456% (3rd)	3.078% (3rd)
7	July 10, 2023	2.262% (2nd)	2.629% (2nd)
8	July 11, 2023	2.974% (2nd)	3.231% (2nd)
Average		2.075%	2.376%
In the table above, the blue numbers represent the lowest ratings and the red numbers represent the highest ratings.; This series aired on a cable channel/pay TV which normally has a relatively smaller audience compared to free-to-air TV/public broadcasters (KBS, SBS, MBC and EBS).

=== Accolades ===
Name of the award ceremony, year presented, category, nominee(s) of the award, and the result of the nomination
Award ceremony	Year	Category	Nominee	Result	Ref.
Baeksang Arts Awards	2024	Best Director	Jung Ji-hyun	Nominated	
Baeksang Arts Awards	2024	Best Actress	Lim Ji-yeon	Nominated	
Bechdel Day	2023	Bechdel Choice 10 – Series Category	Lies Hidden in My Garden	Won	
Bechdel Day	2023	Best Actress – Series Category	Lim Ji-yeon	Won	
