= Because I Hate Korea =

2023 South Korean drama film

- Theatrical release poster
- Hangul: 한국이 싫어서
- RR: Hangugi sireoseo
- MR: Han'gugi sirŏsŏ
- Directed by: Jang Kun-jae
- Screenplay by: Jang Kun-jae
- Based on: 한국이 싫어서 by Chang Kang-myoung
- Produced by: Youn Hee-young
- Starring: Go Ah-sung; Joo Jong-hyuk; Kim Woo-gyeom
- Cinematography: Na Hui-seok
- Edited by: Lee Yeon-jeong
- Music by: Kwun Hyun-jeong
- Production companies: Mocushura; Cinematic Moment; Indiestory; Sidus Pictures
- Distributed by: NK Contents; D-Station
- Release dates: October 4, 2023 (BIFF); August 28, 2024 (South Korea)
- Running time: 106 minutes
- Country: South Korea
- Language: Korean
- Box office: US$347,051

Because I Hate Korea (Korean: 한국이 싫어서) is a 2023 South Korean drama film directed by Jang Kun-jae and starring Go Ah-sung and Joo Jong-hyuk. Based on novel of the same name by Chang Kang-myoung, it follows a woman in her late 20s who suddenly leaves her job, family, and boyfriend behind to go to New Zealand alone in search of her own happiness.

It premiered at 28th Busan International Film Festival as opening film on October 4, 2023. It was released theatrically on August 28, 2024 in South Korea.

== Premise ==
The film tells the story of Gye-na, a woman in her late 20s, who one day suddenly leaves her job, family, and boyfriend behind and heads to New Zealand alone in search of her own happiness.

== Cast ==
- Go Ah-sung as Gye-na
- Joo Jong-hyuk as Jae-in
- Kim Woo-gyeom as Ji-myeong
- Oh Min-ae as Min-ae
- Bang Jae-min
- Kim Ji-young as Kim Tae-eun, the director of the study abroad center
- Morgan Oey as Ricky

== Production ==
Produced by Mocushura in association with Cinematic Moment, Indiestory and Sidus Pictures, the film is distributed by NK Contents and its subsidiary D-Station in South Korea. Principal photography began on July 29, 2022. In January 2023 it was filmed in New Zealand after delay due to COVID-19 pandemic.

== Release ==
Because I Hate Korea had its premiere at 28th Busan International Film Festival as opening film on October 4, 2023.

It was released theatrically on August 28, 2024 in South Korea.

Showbox acquired international sales rights of the film in January 2023.

== Reception ==
=== Box office ===
The film was released on August 28, 2024 on 588 screens.

As of September 8, 2024, the film has grossed US$347,051 from 54,048 admissions.

=== Critical response ===
Lee Marshall reviewing for ScreenDaily at Busan International Film Festival commented on the performance of Go Ah-sung as "The edgy, restless central performance of her brings some dramatic ballast". Marshall found the soundtrack of the film "Muzak" and character of Joo Jong-hyuk "zany". Concluding he wrote that "the film's strongest card is the nascent feminist perspective of a young woman who wants to make her own mistakes – not the ones that [people in her life] impose upon her."

James Marsh of South China Morning Post rated the film 2/5 and criticized it writing, "Unfortunately the film doesn't live up to its promising start, and delivers a string of ill-conceived culture-clash vignettes and stereotypes".

=== Accolades ===
Award	Year	Category	Nominee / Work	Result	Ref.
Bechdel Day	2025	Bechdel Choice 10 — Film	Because I Hate Korea	Won	
Blue Dragon Film Awards	2024	Best New Actor	Joo Jong-hyuk	Nominated	
Buil Film Awards	2025	Best Music	Kwun Hyun-jung	Pending	
