= Shin Dong-woo (actor) =

South Korean actor (born 1998)

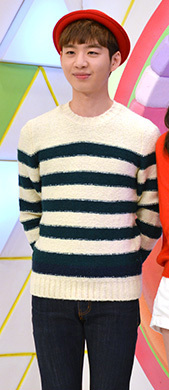
- Shin in 2015
- Born: November 25, 1998 (age 27); Daejeon, South Korea
- Education: Hanlim Multi Art School
- Occupation: Actor
- Years active: 2006–2017

Korean name
- Hangul: 신동우
- Hanja: 申東佑
- RR: Sin Dongu
- MR: Sin Tongu

Shin Dong-woo (Korean: 신동우; born November 25, 1998) is a South Korean actor. He started his mandatory military service on November 26, 2018 and discharged on July 6, 2020.

== Filmography ==
=== Television drama ===
Year	Title	Role
2006	As the River Flows	Dongjaseung (young monk)
2006	Great Inheritance	Jin Kyung-ho
2006	Please Come Back, Soon-ae	Yoon Chan
2006	Drama City: "Elephant in Love"	Han Eun-jae
2006	Drama City: "10 Minutes of your Little Things"	Kim Soo-wan
2007	How to Meet a Perfect Neighbor	Yang Go-ni
2007	If in Love... Like Them	
2008	On Air	Kim Joon-hee
2008	Iljimae	Adopted son of Iljimae's two mothers
2008	East of Eden	child Lee Dong-cheol
2008	Glass Castle	Son Kang-min
2009	The Children of Heaven	Oh Jeong-ho
2010	Bread, Love and Dreams	young Gu Ma-jun
2010	My Girlfriend Is a Gumiho	Goblin (guest)
2010	Flames of Desire	young Kim Min-jae
2010	The King of Legend	Chim Mi-so
2010	Once Upon a Time in Saengchori	teenage Lee Man-soo
2011	Warrior Baek Dong-soo	young Yang Cho-rip
2014	KBS Drama Special: "You're Pretty, Oh Man-bok"	Oh Dae-bok
2014	The Story of Kang-goo	Lee Kang-goo
2014	Flower Grandpa Investigation Unit	teenage Lee Joon-hyuk
2017	Avengers Social Club	Hwang Jung-wook

=== Film ===
Year	Title	Role
2006	Alley	Ye-joon
2008	Hello, Schoolgirl	a kid who is searched by dad
2017	My Son Is Puberty	Dark Circle

=== Music video appearances ===
Year	Song title	Artist
2007	"Love's Greeting"	SeeYa
2014	"My First"	Song Ha-ye

== Awards and nominations ==
Year	Award	Category	Nominated work	Result	Ref.
2007	SBS Drama Awards	Best Young Actor	How to Meet a Perfect Neighbor	Nominated	
2008	MBC Drama Awards	Special Award - Child Artist	East of Eden (with Nam Ji-hyun and Park Gun-tae)	Won	
2010	KBS Drama Awards	Best Young Actor	Bread, Love and Dreams	Nominated	
2010	South Korean Young Artist Awards	Grand Prize (Drama Actor)	Bread, Love and Dreams	Won	
2019	Boni–Hani's 4,000th Episode Special	Cool Chemistry Award (Male)	—N/a	Won	
