= Aloners =

2021 South Korean drama film

- Theatrical release poster
- Hangul: 혼자 사는 사람들
- Lit.: People Living Alone
- RR: Honja saneun saramdeul
- MR: Honja sanŭn saramdŭl
- Directed by: Hong Sung-eun
- Written by: Hong Sung-eun
- Produced by: Lee Seung-won
- Starring: Gong Seung-yeon
- Cinematography: Choi Young-ki
- Edited by: Hong Sung-eun
- Music by: Lim Min-ju
- Production company: Korean Academy of Film Arts
- Release dates: April 30, 2021 (JIFF); May 19, 2021 (South Korea)
- Running time: 91 minutes
- Country: South Korea
- Language: Korean
- Box office: est. $95,848

Aloners (Korean: 혼자 사는 사람들; RR: Honja saneun saramdeul; lit. 'People Living Alone') is a 2021 South Korean drama film edited, written and a directorial feature debut by Hong Sung-eun. It stars Gong Seung-yeon with Jeong Da-eun, Seo Hyun-woo, Park Jeong-hak in supporting roles. The film premiered on April 30, 2021 at the Jeonju International Film Festival and was later screened in the Discovery section of the 2021 Toronto International Film Festival. It was theatrically released in South Korea on May 19, 2021.

== Plot ==
Jina is the top employee at a call centre operating on behalf of a bank's credit card division and holds a tight workplace relationship with her boss – but despite her confident character, her mental health has been taking a toll, leading her to struggle interacting with others: besides her father's nonchalant response to her mother's death, Jina has also recently had to formally renounce her inheritance, in a meeting presided by a lawyer who informed them that she changed her will just two years prior. Spending most of her days withdrawn from society, Jina watches TV dramas in her apartment and mukbang videos during commutes or while eating out alone.

One day, coming home from work, Jina notices a woman pacing in front of her apartment, talking to police officers. After inquiring as to why she is distressed, the woman scolds her for not noticing that a recent loud noise Jina heard some days prior was the sound of her neighbour getting crushed to death by a pile of adult magazines. This confuses Jina, as she recalls him showing her a trick with a matchstick and a cigarette outside of his apartment shortly after he supposedly died. In the evening she eventually reads an illustrated article about his deadly misadventure on her phone.

The following Monday Jina's boss, on orders from the human resources department of the company, asks her to train a new employee, who happens to be a young girl called Sujin. Despite a higher pay, Jina accepts reluctantly, both her and the boss knowing she is not a perfect fit for the task and that her indisposition to normal company affairs is lost performance.

Sujin's training is indeed not without problems, as she's clumsy and overly dependant on Jina. She ends her first morning's shift while falling asleep and does not seem to develop a mindset apt to the workplace, struggling to hold conversations on the phone or answering to clients in an improper way.

An irritated Jina starts avoiding her even more often than before after each shift, and as a result Sujin stops coming into work; Jina's boss is open to the possibility of her returning, but comments that any new development wouldn't probably change the fact that she is not going to be hired, being unable to pass her initial training. Jina eventually tosses Sujin's belongings in an office bin and disposes of her chair and headset.

In the meantime, Jina keeps an eye on her father through a wireless home camera she set up in her parents' house. She sees him inviting his new church's members (which could be from an actual Korean Protestant church, a Presbyterian one, or a cult after his testament money posing as such) to eat in his company, him standing by himself in the bathroom where his wife died, or trying out dance steps in the living room. Jina also meets Seong-hun, a man with a broken leg who's planning to move into her late neighbour's apartment with his family after the death caused the owner of the flat – which happens to be the woman who previously berated Jina for being too selfish – to lower the rent's asking price (Note: In Korea and other Asian countries, homes where the previous tenants have died are usually cleaned up by a special private company and eventually remarketed with an extremely competitive price, usually far less than a half of the original asking price. Known outside of Asia mostly as a Japanese phenomenon, these types of apartments are called jiko bukken (事故物件) in Japan and have a law for specifying their status, which includes further criteria other than a tenant's death such as: being located in zones with a higher crime rate, previous fire incidents, or low occupant retention throughout a short span of years. Before the laws, houses were mostly considered jiko bukken only if the previous tenant died, due to fears based on superstitions deeply embedded in Asian culture.).

Upon returning to work for the week, Jina is more emotional than usual and starts showing the same signs of stress that Sujin experienced. One of the regular callers to her job, who requests all of her monthly spendings to be read to her, raises her voice on the phone and threatens to file a report to the company, asking for Jina's name. Breaking down, Jina briefly zones out before deciding to leave the building.

On a corner on the way to her house, Jina calls her father, screaming at him and demanding he apologizes to her and her mother. This causes him to abruptly hang up and temporarily block Jina's number. Feeling defeated, she crouches by a street light until the evening before going back to her apartment, as her new neighbour is finalising the move in the vacant apartment. A possible problem with the cabling some of the moving company employees could have caused during the move interferes with Jina's TV's signal, much to her annoyance and prompting her to call Seong-hun to ask him to fix the problem when he can.

The following day, Jina decides to wind down. She asks her boss for a leave of absence and calls Sujin, apologising for her cold behaviour as a superior at her job, making her cry. That evening she sees some of Seong-hun's family members and relatives coming inside the newly furnished apartment. Seong-hun holds a vigil offering home-made food and wine to the previous tenant's spirit. Jina watches it from the door, but doesn't come in. When he comes outside, he shows Jina that her old neighbour's smoke trick was true. After she goes back to her apartment, her TV's signal is now stable.

Jina packs her belongings at her workplace and leaves. Whether she is quitting or taking a leave of absence is ambiguous. She speaks to her boss, who asks if she'll look for another job, and expresses regret that they are all working too hard. Jina replies that she doesn't know what she'll do, and suggests that they have dinner when she's figured it out.

Jina gets on the bus and takes a phone call from her father, who pretends that he didn't block her number. She tells him there's a camera in the living room and she'll use it to check on him from time to time.

== Cast ==
- Gong Seung-yeon as Jina
- Jeong Da-eun as Sujin
- Seo Hyun-woo: Seong-hun
- Park Jeong-hak as Jina's father

== Release and reception ==
The film was also screened at 1st Ulsan International Film Festival on December 18, 2021.

=== Critical response ===
On review aggregator website Rotten Tomatoes, the film has an approval rating of 97% based on 38 critics, with an average rating of 7.5 out of 10. The website's critics consensus reads, "A meditation on isolation, Aloners poignantly explores grief, or the avoidance of it, and the technological walls we build around us."

Jonathan Romney of Screen International wrote "Aloners transcends its limitations through acute character observation, impressive directorial control and a strong performance from lead actress Gong Seung-yeon".

Aviva Dove-Viebahn of Ms. magazine called the film "a stirring portrait of the cages we build for ourselves—and questions how and when we may want to be free of them".

== Awards and nominations ==
Year	Award	Category	Recipient	Result	Ref(s)
2021	15th Asian Film Awards	Best Newcomer	Gong Seung-yeon	Nominated	
2021	42nd Blue Dragon Film Awards	Best New Actress	Gong Seung-yeon	Won	
2021	39th Torino Film Festival	Best Actress	Gong Seung-yeon	Won	
