= Korean Film Council =

South Korean government organization

Agency overview
- Formed: 3 April 1973
- Preceding agencies: Korean Motion Picture Promotion Corporation; Korean Film Commission
- Jurisdiction: South Korea
- Headquarters: Haeundae, Busan, South Korea
- Parent agency: Ministry of Culture, Sports and Tourism
- Website: kofic.or.kr

Korean name
- Hangul: 영화진흥위원회
- Hanja: 映畫振興委員會
- RR: Yeonghwa jinheung wiwonhoe
- MR: Yŏnghwa chinhŭng wiwŏnhoe

The Korean Film Council (KOFIC; Korean: 영화진흥위원회) is a state-supported, self-administered organization under the Ministry of Culture, Sports and Tourism (MCST) of South Korea.

== History ==
KOFIC was launched in 1973 as the Korean Motion Picture Promotion Corporation (KMPPC). It changed its name to Korean Film Commission in 1999, to be set up as a self-regulating body that could institute film policy without requiring the ratification of the Ministry of Culture. It changed its name once more to Korean Film Council in 2004 to avoid confusion with local film commissions that provide support for location shooting.

== Roles ==
KOFIC is composed of nine commissioners, including one full-time chairman and 8 committee members appointed by the Ministry of Culture, Sports and Tourism in order to discuss and decide on the main policies related to Korean films.

It aims to promote and support Korean films both in Korea and abroad.

== Timeline (1973–2013) ==
- April 1973 - Founded as Korea Motion Picture Promotion Corporation
- March 1984 - Korean Academy of Film Arts (KAFA) established
- October 1997 - Korean Film Promotion Fund established
- November 1997 - Completion of Namyangju Studios
- February 1998 - Film Promotion Law sets legal framework for KOFIC
- May 1999 - Korean Film Commission launched
- March 2004 - Korean Film Commission renamed Korean Film Council
- July 2007 - Film Development Fund established
- March 2012 - Korean Film Business Center opens in Beijing
- October 2013 - Deadline for KOFIC to relocate to Busan

== See also ==
- KOFIC Location Incentive
