= Shim Dal-gi =

South Korean television and film actress (born 1999)

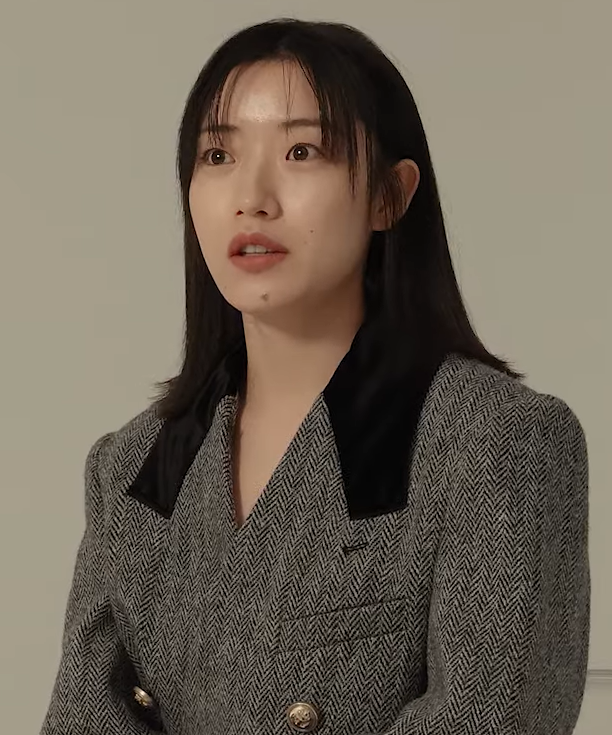
- Shim in October 2022
- Born: June 12, 1999 (age 27)
- Other name: Sim Dal-gi
- Occupations: Actress; production department; directing department
- Years active: 2018–present
- Agent: Saram Entertainment

Korean name
- Hangul: 심달기
- Hanja: 沈達琪
- RR: Sim Dalgi
- MR: Sim Talgi

Shim Dal-gi (Korean: 심달기; born on 12 June 1999) is a South Korean actress. She made her acting debut in 2018 and since then she has appeared in a number of films and television series. She is most well known for her role in the film Snowball (2020) and Kakao TV's original Shadow Beauty (2021). She also appeared in the Netflix original series The School Nurse Files (2020) and Juvenile Justice (2022). In 2022, she appeared in the omnibus TV series Our Blues.

== Career ==
Shim made her debut as a director at the age of 18 in the film Nobody's Subconscious and Realm, released in 2016.

Shim Dal-gi made her acting debut in 2018 in the TV series Feel Good to Die, and short film Dong-a for which she was awarded the Jury's Special Award for the Actor at Mise-en-scène Short Film Festival.

In 2021 Shim was cast in Kakao TV's original web drama Shadow Beauty as a main cast member. She got recognition after appearing in TV series Hospital Playlist and Netflix original The School Nurse Files (2020), and films Dust-Man and Snowball (2021). She was nominated for the Baeksang Arts Award for Best Supporting Actress – Film at the 58th Baeksang Arts Awards for her role as Ah-ram in Snowball.

In 2022, she is gaining popularity for her role as the young version of Jeong Eun-hee (Lee Jung-eun) in tvN series Our Blues. Her portrayal of a shy high school girl and "her various expressions and emotional performances that change depending on the situation" were appreciated.

Modelling

In 2021 she appeared in an advertisement for Baedal People and cosmetics company Astra. She was crowned "Advertising Fairy".

== Filmography ==
=== Films ===
Year	Title	Role	Notes	Ref.
2018	Dong-a		Short film	
2019	Juror 8	Kang So-ra		
2019	Tune in for Love	Eun-ja's daughter Geum-yi		
2019	Maggie	Hospital patient / demonstrator against redevelopment	Also secondary staff in production department	
2020	Samjin Company English Class	Daughter from the orchard		
2020	Today, Together 2		In direction department	
2021	Dust-Man	Mo-ah		
2021	Shaman Road		Special appearance	
2021	Snowball	Ah-ram		
2022	A Glimpse at Lee Hyo-ri	little sister	TVING Short Film	
2022	Alienoid	bride	Special appearance	
2022	Rolling	Ju-ri		
2022	Life Is Beautiful	Hyeon-jeong		
2024	Following	Ji-Hee		

=== Television series ===
Year	Title	Role	Notes	Ref.
2018	Feel Good to Die	Jeong-mi		
2019	Save Me 2	Gwang-mi		
2020–2021	Hospital Playlist	Chan-hyeong's mother	Season 1–2	
2022	Our Blues	young Jeong Eun-hee		
2023	Revenant	Lee Hyang-yi	Cameo (Eps 11)	

=== Web series ===
Year	Title	Role	Notes	Ref.
2019–2020	Kingdom	Soju room court lady	Season 1–2	
2019	Persona	Hye-bok	Seg. 'Sinned Kiss'	
2020	The School Nurse Files	Heo Wan-soo		
2021	Shadow Beauty	Goo Hae-jin	Lead role	
2022	Juvenile Justice	Seo Yu-ri		
2023-present	Moving	Shin Hye-won		

== Awards and nominations ==
Name of the award ceremony, year presented, category, nominee of the award, and the result of the nomination
Award ceremony	Year	Category	Nominee / Work	Result	Ref.
Baeksang Arts Awards	2022	Best Supporting Actress – Film	Snowball	Nominated	
Chunsa Film Art Awards	2022	Best Supporting Actress	Snowball	Nominated	
Korea Culture Entertainment Awards	2022	Excellence Award, Actress Film	Life Is Beautiful, Don't Stop	Won	
Mise-en-scène Short Film Festival	2018	Jury's Special Award for the Actor	Dong-a	Won	
SBS Drama Awards	2023	Scene Stealer Award	Revenant	Nominated	
Wildflower Film Awards	2022	Best New Actor/Actress	Snowball	Nominated	
