= Yi Yeon =

Yi Yeon (Korean: 이연; RR: I Yeon) may refer to:

- Seonjo of Joseon (1552–1608), personal name Yi Yeon
- Hyeonjong of Joseon (1641–1674), personal name Yi Yeon
- Lee Yeon (born 1995), South Korean actress
