= Baeksang Arts Award for Best Supporting Actress – Film =

Annual South Korean film award

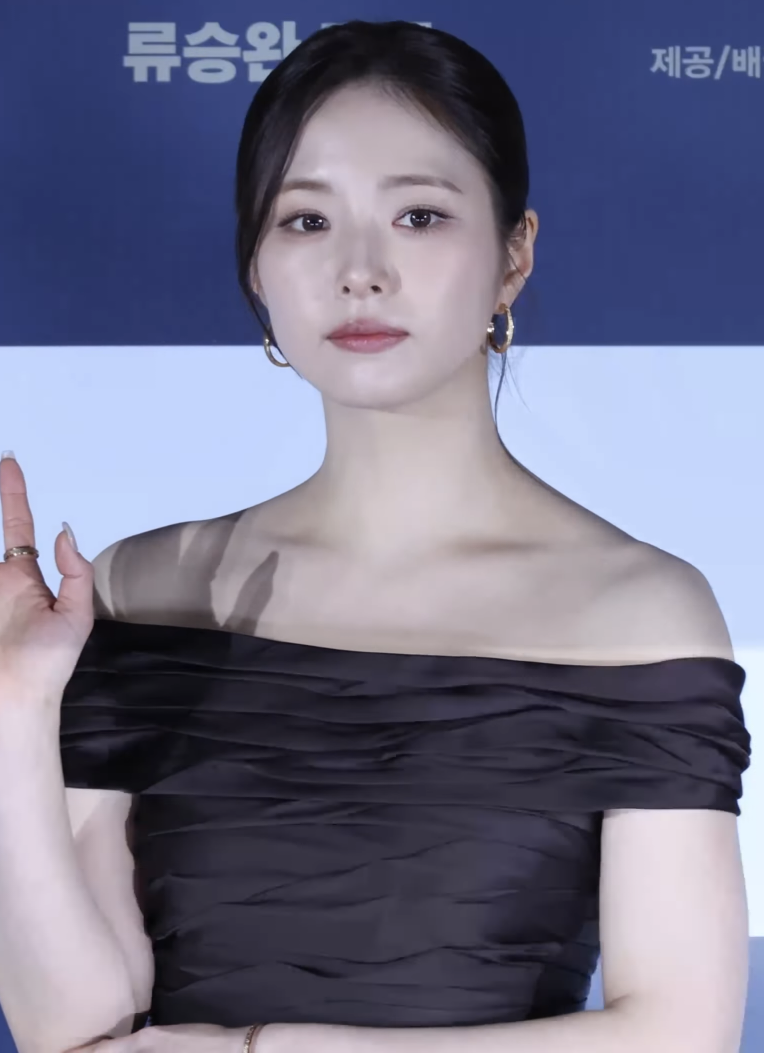
- 2026 recipient: Shin Se-kyung
- Awarded for: Best performance by an actress in a supporting role in a South Korean film
- Country: South Korea
- Presented by: Baeksang Arts Awards
- Most recent winner: Shin Se-kyung; Humint (2026)
- Website: baeksangartsawards

The Baeksang Arts Award for Best Supporting Actress – Film (Korean: 백상예술대상 영화부문 여자 조연상; RR: Baeksang Yesul Daesang Yeonghwa Bumun Yeoja Joyeonsang) is an award presented annually at the Baeksang Arts Awards ceremony organised by Ilgan Sports and JTBC Plus, affiliates of JoongAng Ilbo, usually in the second quarter of each year in Seoul.

== Winners and nominees ==
Table key
‡	Indicates the winner

=== 1970s ===
Year	Winner and nominees	Film	Original title	Role(s)
1977 (13th)	Jung Young-sook ‡	He Knows Gwanghwamun Well	광화문통 아이	Jun Hwi

=== 2010s ===
Year	Winner and nominees	Film	Original title	Role(s)
2013 (49th)	Jo Eun-ji ‡	The Concubine	후궁: 제왕의 첩	Geum-ok
2013 (49th)	Jun Ji-hyun	The Thieves	도둑들	Yenicall
2013 (49th)	Moon Jeong-hee	Deranged	연가시	Gyung-seon
2013 (49th)	Park Shin-hye	Miracle in Cell No. 7	7번방의 선물	Ye-sung (Adult)
2013 (49th)	Shin So-yul	Whatcha Wearin'?	나의 P.S. 파트너	So-yeon
2014 (50th)	Jin Kyung ‡	Cold Eyes	감시자들	Department head Lee
2014 (50th)	Go Ah-sung	Snowpiercer	설국열차	Yona
2014 (50th)	Kim Young-ae	The Attorney	변호인	Choi Soon-ae
2014 (50th)	Ra Mi-ran	Hope	소원	Young-seok's mother
2014 (50th)	Ye Ji-won	Our Sunhi	우리 선희	Joohyun
2015 (51st)	Kim Ho-jung ‡	Revivre	화장	Oh's wife
2015 (51st)	Han Ye-ri	Sea Fog	해무	Hong-mae
2015 (51st)	Cho Yeo-jeong	Obsessed	인간중독	Lee Sook-jin
2015 (51st)	Lee Jung-hyun	The Admiral: Roaring Currents	명량	Mrs. Jeong
2015 (51st)	Moon Jeong-hee	Cart	카트	Hye-mi
2016 (52nd)	Ra Mi-ran ‡	The Himalayas	히말라야	Jo Myeong-ae
2016 (52nd)	Jang Young-nam	The Classified File	극비수사	Eun-joo's aunt
2016 (52nd)	Jeon Hye-jin	The Throne	사도	Consort Yeong
2016 (52nd)	Ryu Hyun-kyung	Office	오피스	Hong Ji-sun
2016 (52nd)	Uhm Ji-won	The Silenced	경성학교: 사라진 소녀들	Headmistress
2017 (53rd)	Kim So-jin ‡	The King	더 킹	Ahn Hee-yeon
2017 (53rd)	Ra Mi-ran	The Last Princess	덕혜옹주	Bok-soon
2017 (53rd)	Bae Doona	Tunnel	터널	Se-hyun
2017 (53rd)	Chun Woo-hee	The Wailing	곡성	Moo-myung
2017 (53rd)	Han Ji-min	The Age of Shadows	밀정	Yeon Gye-soon
2018 (54th)	Lee Soo-kyung ‡	Heart Blackened	침묵	Im Mi-ra
2018 (54th)	Yeom Hye-ran	I Can Speak	아이 캔 스피크	Woman from Jinju
2018 (54th)	Esom	Warriors of the Dawn	대립군	Duk-yi
2018 (54th)	Lee Hanee	Heart Blackened	침묵	Park Yoo-na
2018 (54th)	Jeon Hye-jin	The Merciless	불한당: 나쁜 놈들의 세상	Chun In-sook
2019 (55th)	Kwon So-hyun ‡	Miss Baek	미쓰백	Joo Mi-kyung
2019 (55th)	Yeom Hye-ran	Innocent Witness	증인	Mi-ran
2019 (55th)	Lee Hanee	Extreme Job	극한직업	Detective Jang
2019 (55th)	Jo Min-su	The Witch: Part 1. The Subversion	마녀	Dr. Baek
2019 (55th)	Jin Seo-yeon	Believer	독전	Bo-ryeong

=== 2020s ===
Year	Winner and nominees	Film	Original title	Role(s)
2020 (56th)	Kim Sae-byuk ‡	House of Hummingbird	벌새	Yong-ji
2020 (56th)	Kim Guk-hee	Tune in for Love	유열의 음악앨범	Eun-ja
2020 (56th)	Kim Mi-kyung	Kim Ji-young: Born 1982 (film)	82년생 김지영	Mi-sook
2020 (56th)	Park So-dam	Parasite	기생충	Kim Ki-jeong
2020 (56th)	Lee Jung-eun	Parasite	기생충	Gook Moon-gwang
2021 (57th)	Kim Sun-young ‡	Three Sisters	세 자매	Hee-sook
2021 (57th)	Bae Jong-ok	Innocence	결백	Chae Hwa-ja
2021 (57th)	Lee Re	Peninsula	반도	Jooni
2021 (57th)	Esom	Samjin Company English Class	삼진그룹 영어토익반	Jung Yoo-na
2021 (57th)	Lee Jung-eun	The Day I Died: Unclosed Case	내가 죽던 날	Suncheondaek
2022 (58th)	Lee Soo-kyung ‡	Miracle: Letters to the President	기적	Jung Bo-kyung
2022 (58th)	Kim So-jin	Escape from Mogadishu	모가디슈	Kim Myung-hee
2022 (58th)	Kim Jae-hwa	Escape from Mogadishu	모가디슈	Jo Soo-jin
2022 (58th)	Shim Dal-gi	Snowball	최선의 삶	Ah-ram
2022 (58th)	Oh Na-ra	Perhaps Love	장르만 로맨스	Mi-ae
2023 (59th)	Park Se-wan ‡	6/45	육사오	Ri Yeon-hee
2023 (59th)	Bae Doona	Broker	브로커	Soo-jin
2023 (59th)	Ahn Eun-jin	The Night Owl	올빼미	Jo So-yong
2023 (59th)	Yum Jung-ah	Alienoid	외계+인	Heug-seol
2023 (59th)	Lee Yeon	Kill Boksoon	길복순	Kim Yeong-ji
2024 (60th)	Lee Sang-hee ‡	My Name Is Loh Kiwan	로기완	Seon-ju
2024 (60th)	Kim Sun-young	Concrete Utopia	콘크리트 유토피아	Geum-ae
2024 (60th)	Yum Jung-ah	Alienoid: Return to the Future	외계+인 2부	Heug-seol
2024 (60th)	Yeom Hye-ran	Citizen of a Kind	시민덕희	Bong-rim
2024 (60th)	Krystal Jung	Cobweb	거미집	Han Yu-rim
2025 (61st)	Claudia Kim ‡	A Normal Family	보통의 가족	Ji-su
2025 (61st)	Gong Seung-yeon	Handsome Guys	핸섬가이즈	Kim Mi-na
2025 (61st)	Lim Ji-yeon	Revolver	리볼버	Jeong Yoon-sun
2025 (61st)	Jeon Yeo-been	Dark Nuns	검은 수녀들	Sister Michaela
2025 (61st)	Han Sun-hwa	Pilot	파일럿	Han Jung-mi
2026 (62nd)	Shin Se-kyung ‡	Humint	휴민트	Chae Seon-hwa
2026 (62nd)	Shin Hyun-been	The Ugly	얼굴	Jung Young-hee
2026 (62nd)	Yeom Hye-ran	No Other Choice	어쩔수가없다	Lee A-ra
2026 (62nd)	Jang Hye-jin	The World of Love	세계의 주인	Kang Tae-sun
2026 (62nd)	Jeon Mi-do	The King's Warden	왕과 사는 남자	Mae-hwa

== Sources ==
- "Baeksang Arts Awards Nominees and Winners Lists". Naver Movie (in Korean).
- "Baeksang Arts Awards Winners Lists". Baeksang Arts Awards (in Korean).
