= Chunsa Film Art Awards 2022 =

27th edition of award ceremony

27th Chunsa International Film Festival
- Official poster
- Awarded for: Excellence in cinematic achievements
- Awarded by: Korean Film Directors Association
- Announced on: August 26, 2022
- Presented on: September 30, 2022
- Site: Sowol Art Hall, Seoul, South Korea
- Hosted by: Kim Ye-eun; Ji Eun-ho
- Official website: Chunsa Film Art Awards

Highlights
- Best Direction: Park Chan-wook; Decision to Leave
- Best Actor: Park Hae-il; Decision to Leave
- Best Actress: Tang Wei; Decision to Leave
- Most awards: 3 - Decision to Leave and The Roundup
- Most nominations: 8 — Escape from Mogadishu; 5 — Decision to Leave and Hansan: Rising Dragon

The Chunsa Film Art Awards (Korean: 춘사국제영화제; Hanja: 春史國際映畫祭; also known as The 27th Chunsa International Film Festival) have been hosted by the Korean Film Directors Association, since the 1990s to commemorate the Korean film pioneer Chunsa Na Woon-gyu. Previously known as Chunsa Film Festival, it became an international film festival last year.

Themed as 'Move Again', The 27th Chunsa International Film Festival was held on September 30. In this edition, nominees from films released from July 1, 2021 to July 31, 2022 were selected for the main awards in 10 categories. In the ceremony hosted by Kim Ye-eun and Ji Eun-ho, Park Chan-wook won the best direction award for Decision to Leave.

== Judges ==
- Koo Hye-sun: South Korean actress, singer-songwriter, director and artist.
- Yoo Young-sik: South Korean film director, film critic, film producer, and university professor.
- Park Jong-won: South Korean film director and screenwriter
- Shin Seung-soo: South Korean writer and director
- Jo Jom-hwan

== Winners and nominees ==
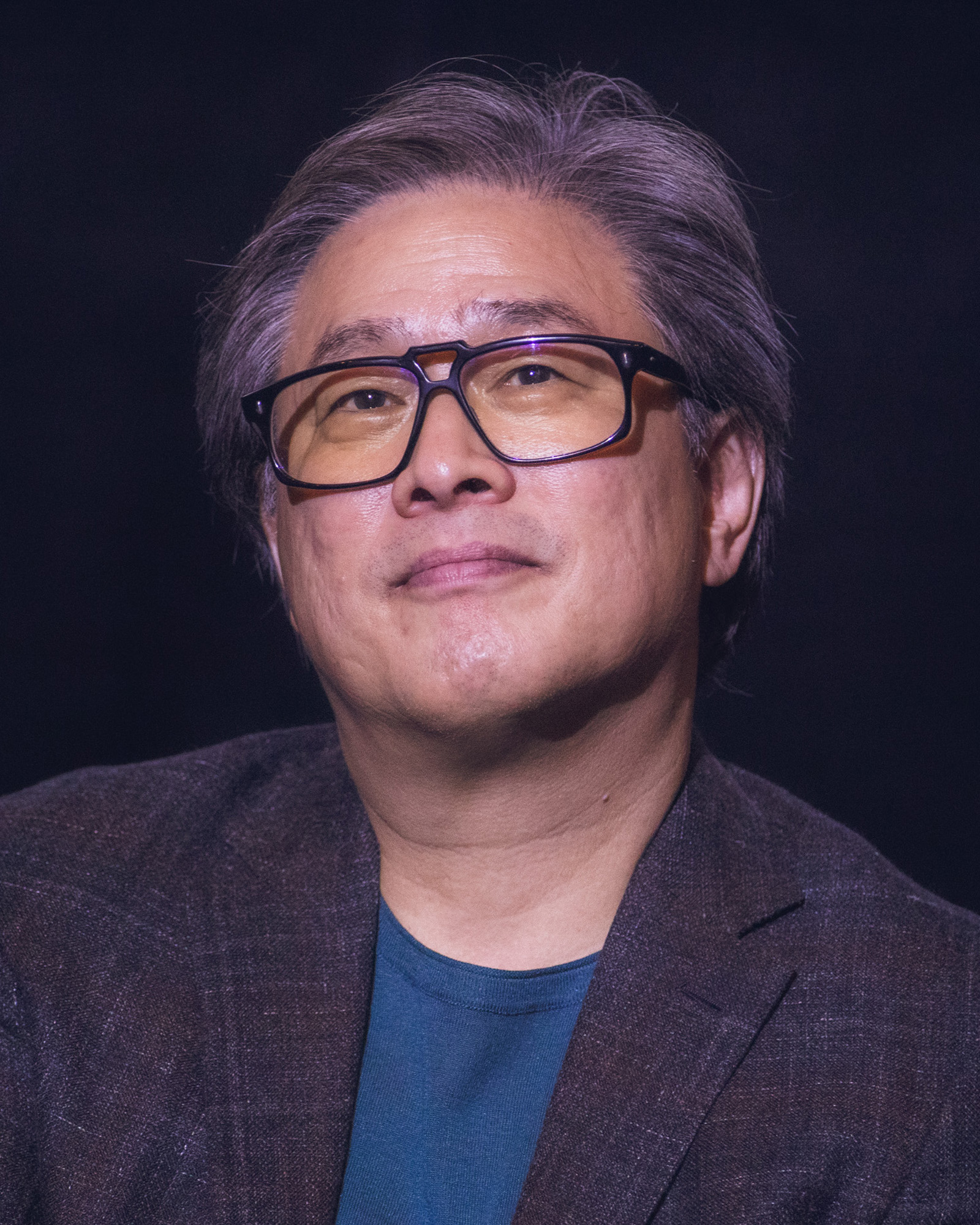
Park Chan-wook, Best Director award winner

The nominees for the 27th Chunsa Film Art Awards were announced on August 26, 2022.

Winners are in bold

**Best Director**	**Best New Director**
**Park Chan-wook – Decision to Leave**; Shin Su-won – Hommage; Byun Sung-hyun – Kingmaker; Kim Han-min – Hansan: Rising Dragon; Hong Sang-soo – In Front of Your Face; Ryoo Seung-wan – Escape from Mogadishu	**Lee Sang-yong – The Roundup**; Lee Woo-jeong – Snowball; Kim Mi-jo – Gull; Lee Ran-hee – Vacation; Pil Kam-sung – Hostage: Missing Celebrity; Nam Koong-sun – Ten Months; Jo Eun-ji – Perhaps Love
**Best Screenplay**	**Technical Award**
**Kim Han-min and Yun Hong-gi – Hansan: Rising Dragon**; Kim Mi-jo – Gull; Jeong Seo-kyeong and Park Chan-wook – Decision to Leave; Lee Ran-hee – A Leave; Ryoo Seung-wan and Lee Gi-cheol– Escape from Mogadishu	**Choi Young-hwan - (Cinematography) — Escape from Mogadishu**; Bang Jun-seok (Music) — Escape from Mogadishu; Kim Tae-young (Art) — Sinkhole; Jeong Seong-jin, Jeong Cheol-min (VFX) – Hansan: Rising Dragon; Kim Ji-yong (Cinematography) — Decision to Leave; Gal-Seung Jee and Jae-Hyeon Park (VFX) – Alienoid
**Best Actor**	**Best Actress**
**Park Hae-il – Decision to Leave**; Song Kang-ho – Broker; Kim Yoon-seok – Escape from Mogadishu; Sul Kyung-gu – Kingmaker; Hwang Jung-min – Hostage: Missing Celebrity	**Tang Wei – Decision to Leave**; Lee Jeong-eun – Hommage; Lee Hye-young – In Front of Your Face; Park So-dam – Special Delivery; Chun Woo-hee – Anchor
**Best Supporting Actor**	**Best Supporting Actress**
**Park Ji-hwan – The Roundup**; Huh Joon-ho – Escape from Mogadishu; Koo Kyo-hwan – Escape from Mogadishu; Byun Yo-han – Hansan: Rising Dragon; Jo Woo-Jin – Kingmaker; Son Suk-ku – The Roundup	**Oh Na-ra – Perhaps Love**; Kim So-jin – Escape from Mogadishu; Lee Soo-kyung – Miracle: Letters to the President; Kim Hyang-gi – Hansan: Rising Dragon; Shim Dal-gi – Snowball
**Best New Actor**	**Best New Actress**
**Mu Jin-sung – Perhaps Love**; **Kim Dong-hwi – In Our Prime**; Tang Jun-sang – Hommage; Kim Jae-beom – Hostage: Missing Celebrity; Lee Hong-nae – Hot Blooded	**Lee Ji-eun – Broker**; Bang Min-ah – Snowball; Kim Hye-yoon – The Girl on a Bulldozer; Shin Si-ah – The Witch: Part 2. The Other One
**Special Award: Chunsa International Director's Award**	**Audiences' Choice Award for Most Popular Film**
**Kore-eda Hirokazu – Broker**	**The Roundup**
**Achievement Award**
**Lee Jang-ho**; **Shin Seung-soo**

== Films with multiple nominations ==
The following films received multiple nominations:

Nominations	Films
8	Escape from Mogadishu
5	Decision to Leave
5	Hansan: Rising Dragon
