= Yongsoon =

- Theatrical poster
- Hangul: 용순
- RR: Yongsun
- MR: Yongsun
- Directed by: Shin Joon
- Written by: Shin Joon
- Produced by: Kim Ji-hye
- Starring: Lee Soo-kyung
- Cinematography: Kwon Young-il
- Edited by: Park Min-seon
- Production company: ATO
- Distributed by: Lotte Entertainment
- Release dates: October 2016 (BIFF); June 8, 2017 (South Korea)
- Running time: 104 minutes
- Country: South Korea
- Language: Korean
- Box office: US$88,255

Yongsoon (Korean: 용순) is a 2016 South Korean drama film directed by Shin Joon.

== Production ==
The director Shin Joon first made a short film called Yongsoon, Summer of 18 as his graduation project while majoring film in the Korea National University of Arts in 2014. The film was inspired from his early days as a instructor in a hagwon teaching middle school and highschool students. After producer Kim ji hye saw this short film, she asked him to make it into a full length feature film. The actor for the role of Cheyuk teacher was carefully selected to portray the kind nature the role possessed. The director revealed that his cinematography for the film was influenced by the 2015 film Our Little Sister directed by Japanese director Hirokazu Kore-eda. The film was filmed in Okcheon in Chungcheong Province and thus the protagonists speak in the Chungcheong dialect . The director said that this setting was intentional because he was originally from Daejeon. The stepmother of Yongsoon was intentionally set as a Mongolian to address the issue of discrimination towards foreiginers in South Korea. The film premiered in 2016 at Busan International Film Festival.

== Plot ==
Yongsoon is a teenage girl who lost her mom to cancer at an early age, after which her father married a foreign woman. One day she joins a school athletics club and discovers young love when she falls for her school's athletics team coach, Che-yook. Her friend Bbak-gyu loves her and write many love poems to her, but his love is unrequited. Yongsoon eventually finds out through Bbak-gyu that Che-yook has a lover, and to dissuade her from dating, Yongsoon lies that the team coach impregnated her.

== Cast ==
- Lee Soo-kyung as Yong-soon
  - Kim Ha-yeon as Young Yong-soon
- Choi Deok-moon as Father
- Kim Dong-young as Bbak-gyu
- Park Keun-rok as Che-yook
- Jang Haet-sal as Moon-hee
- Choi Yeo-jin as English teacher
- Choi Chan-sook as Che-yook's mother

== Awards and nominations ==
Award	Category	Recipient	Result
21st Busan International Film Festival	Daemyung Culture Wave Award	Yongsoon	Won
26th Buil Film Awards	Best New Actress	Lee Soo-kyung	Nominated
54th Grand Bell Awards	Best New Actress	Lee Soo-kyung	Nominated
54th Grand Bell Awards	Best New Director	Shin Joon	Nominated
38th Blue Dragon Film Awards	Best New Actress	Lee Soo-kyung	Nominated
18th Women in Film Korea Awards	Best New Actress	Lee Soo-kyung	Won
54th Baeksang Arts Awards	Best New Actress	Lee Soo-kyung	Nominated
54th Baeksang Arts Awards	Best New Director	Shin Joon	Nominated
23rd Chunsa Film Art Awards	Best New Actress	Lee Soo-kyung	Nominated
