= Juvenile Justice (TV series) =

2022 South Korean television series

- Promotional poster
- Hangul: 소년 심판
- Hanja: 少年 審判
- Lit.: Juvenile Judgement
- RR: Sonyeon simpan
- MR: Sonyŏn simp'an
- Genre: Legal drama
- Written by: Kim Min-seok
- Directed by: Hong Jong-chan
- Starring: Kim Hye-soo; Kim Mu-yeol; Lee Sung-min; Lee Jung-eun
- Country of origin: South Korea
- Original language: Korean
- No. of episodes: 10

Production
- Camera setup: Multi camera
- Running time: 55–70 minutes
- Production companies: Gill Pictures; GTist

Original release
- Network: Netflix
- Release: February 25, 2022

Juvenile Justice (Korean: 소년 심판) is a 2022 South Korean legal drama television series that premiered on Netflix on February 25, 2022. Written by Kim Min-seok and directed by Hong Jong-chan, it stars Kim Hye-soo, Kim Mu-yeol, and Lee Sung-min. Juvenile Justice tells the story of a judge who is known for her dislike of juveniles and gets appointed as judge of a juvenile court. The court-room drama sends a message of how society is also responsible for juveniles' acts.

== Synopsis ==
Shim Eun-seok, an elite judge with a cold and distant personality who is known for her dislike of juveniles, is appointed judge of a juvenile court in the Yeonhwa District. There, she breaks customs and administers her own ways of punishing the young offenders. Eun-seok has to deal with and balance her aversion to minor offenders with firm beliefs on justice and punishment as she tackles complex cases while discovering what being an adult truly means.

== Cast and characters ==
=== Main ===
- Kim Hye-soo as Sim Eun-seok, a stern judge of the Juvenile Court with a bitter past that shaped how she perceived juvenile offenders
- Kim Mu-yeol as Cha Tae-joo, a compassionate judge of the Juvenile Court with a past history as a victim of domestic abuse and being in juvenile reformation center. He believes in giving second chances to juveniles as he views them as redeemable as a result of his juvenile past
- Lee Sung-min as Kang Won-jung, chief of Juvenile Justice Division
- Lee Jung-eun as Na Geun-hee, who succeed Kang Won-joong as chief of the Juvenile Justice Division. She is the polar opposite of Eun-seok regarding their stance towards the sentencing of juvenile offenders

=== Supporting ===
==== Juvenile Offenders ====
- Lee Yeon as Baek Seong-woo, conspirator in the Yeonhwa Elementary School Murder Case.
- Hwang Hyeon-jeong as Han Ye-eun, the main culprit in the Yeonhwa Elementary School murder case.
- Jo Mi-nyeo as Woo Seol-ah, a juvenile pickpocket criminal
- Shim Dal-gi as Seo Yu-ri
- Song Duk-ho as Kwak Do-seok, a driver involved in the minor unlicensed driving accident (episodes 7, 8).
- Kim Do-gun as Seo Dong-gyun
- Kim Jun-ho as Kang Shin-woo, Kang Won-joong's son involved in exam cheating cases.
- Lee Bom as Gyu-sang's wife
- Lee Seok-hyung as Lee Nam-kyung, a boy who goes to court in a traffic accident case without a license for minors.
- Kim Gyun-ha as 'Baek Do-hyun', a brutal juvenile criminal leader. At age eleven, Do-hyun and his friend Hwang In-jun murdered Shim Eun-seok's son Nam-goong Chan but were acquitted of the crime; he and In-jun both later appear in court for a sexual offence.

==== Victim's parents and offenders ====
- Song Duk-ho
- Kim Chan-hyung as Ji-hoo's biological father
- Park Bo-kyung as Ji Hoo's mother
- Kim Do-geon
- Jang Dae-woong

==== Yeonhwa District Court ====
- Park Ji-yeon as Woo Soo-mi, director of the Juvenile Criminal Compromise Unit
- Lee Sang-hee as Joo Young-sil, officers involved in juvenile criminal deals.
- Shin Jae-hwi as Seo-bum, executive officer of the Juvenile Criminal Agreement
- Keum Kwang-sun as Han Kyung-Jung, judicial police inspector under the Ministry of Justice

==== Pureum Youth Recovery Center ====
- Yeom Hye-ran as Oh Seon-ja, director of Pureum Youth Recovery Center.
- Jung Yi-soo as Kim Ah-reum, Oh Seon-ja's daughter and Kim Ah-jin's older sister.
- Park Chae-hee as Kim Ah-jin, Oh Seon-ja's daughter and Kim Ah-reum's younger sister.
- Kim Bo-young as Choi Young-na
- Yoon Seo-ah as Go Hye-rim
- Choi Ji-soo as Oh Yeon-ji
- Jo Yoon-su as Yoon Eun-jeong
- Ha Yi-an as Woo Min-kyeong
- Kim Jung-yoon as Yeo Ji-eun
- Cho Hyun-seo as Han Min-joo

=== Others ===
- Kim Joo-hun as Namkoong Yi-hwan, prosecutor of the Supreme Prosecutor Office and Sim Eun-seok's ex-husband.
- Kim Young-ah as Heo Chan-mi, a member of Geobo Law Firm and lawyer in charge of Han Ye-eun and Shim Eun-seok, a classmate of a training academy.
- Park Jong-hwan as Go Gang-sik, police officers dealing with cases of violence against children, women, youth and domestic violence
- Yoo Jae-myung as Um Joon-gi, an assemblyman
- Park Jung-yoon as Do Yoo-kyung
- Shin Yeon-woo as Chi-hyeon, a detective in the female youth division. She solves child cases together with Go Kang-sik, the head of the department.
- Chung Su-bin as Baek Mi-joo, a young criminal in an unlicensed hit-and-run case.
- Jeon Guk-hyang as Yoo Hye-sun

== Production ==
=== Development ===
Netflix in November 2020 confirmed the production of original series Juvenile Justice. It was also confirmed that Hong Jong-chan will direct the series with Kim Hye-soo playing Sim Eun-seok, a newly appointed judge. The series will revolve around issues of the juvenile statutes, and daily lives and concerns of juvenile court judges. On January 27, 2023, it was reported that the production of season 2 has been canceled.

=== Casting ===
In December 2020 casting of Kim Mu-yeol and Lee Sung-min as main lead was confirmed.

=== Filming ===
On May 4, it was reported that Kim Hye-soo was filming Netflix's series Juvenile Justice.

== Reception ==
=== Critical response ===
On the review aggregator website Rotten Tomatoes, 100% of 5 critics' reviews are positive, with an average rating of 6.5/10.

Joel Keller of Decider reviewing the series wrote, "Juvenile Justice is about as close to an American-style procedural as Netflix or Korean TV gets. We hope we get a little more backstory on the main character, but the cases might just be compelling enough to keep our interest." Pierce Conran of the South China Morning Post gave 3 stars out of 5 and wrote, "A grounded actors showcase that explores juvenile delinquency in a tightly woven frame of jurisprudence which occasionally shifts into a very melodramatic gear."

=== Viewership ===
For two weeks in a row, from February 28 to March 6, and March 7 to March 13, Juvenile Justice garnered 45.93 million and 25.94 million viewing hours, respectively, and was Number 1 in Netflix's "Global Top 10" weekly list of the most-watched non-English television shows.

== Awards and nominations ==
Name of the award ceremony, year presented, category, nominee of the award, and the result of the nomination
Award ceremony	Year	Category	Nominee / Work	Result	Ref.
APAN Star Awards	2022	Best Writer Award	Kim Min-seok	Nominated	
APAN Star Awards	2022	Top Excellence Award, Actress in an OTT Drama	Kim Hye-soo	Nominated	
APAN Star Awards	2022	Excellence Award, Actress in an OTT Drama	Lee Jung-eun	Nominated	
Asian Academy Creative Awards	2022	Best Actress in a leading role	Kim Hye-soo	Nominated	
Asian Academy Creative Awards	2022	Best Actress in a Supporting role	Lee Jung-eun	Nominated	
Baeksang Arts Awards	2022	Best Screenplay	Kim Min-seok	Won	
Baeksang Arts Awards	2022	Best Actress	Kim Hye-soo	Nominated	
Baeksang Arts Awards	2022	Best New Actress	Lee Yeon	Nominated	
Blue Dragon Series Awards	2022	Best Leading Actress	Kim Hye-soo	Nominated	
Blue Dragon Series Awards	2022	Best Supporting Actress	Lee Jung-eun	Nominated	
