= Adamas (TV series) =

2022 South Korean television series

- Promotional poster
- Hangul: 아다마스
- RR: Adamaseu
- MR: Adamasŭ
- Genre: Fantasy; Romance
- Developed by: Studio Dragon (planning)
- Written by: Choi Tae-kang
- Directed by: Park Seung-woo
- Starring: Ji Sung; Seo Ji-hye; Lee Soo-kyung
- Music by: Jang Young-kyu
- Country of origin: South Korea
- Original language: Korean
- No. of episodes: 16

Production
- Executive producer: So Jae-hyun
- Producers: Park Mae-hee; Lee Dong-eun; Park Gyu-won
- Running time: 77 minutes
- Production companies: Studio Dragon; Mays Entertainment

Original release
- Network: tvN
- Release: July 27 – September 15, 2022

Adamas (Korean: 아다마스) is a South Korean television series starring Ji Sung, Seo Ji-hye, and Lee Soo-kyung. It aired on tvN from July 27 to September 15, 2022, every Wednesday and Thursday at 22:30 (KST) for 16 episodes. It is also available for streaming on Disney+ in selected regions and Hulu in the United States.

== Synopsis ==
Adamas tells the story of twin brothers (Ji Sung) fighting against evil to unveil the truth behind a murder that happened 22 years ago in order to clear their biological father's charges, who was accused of killing their stepfather after hearing the death penalty date that has been scheduled for their biological father.

== Cast ==
=== Main ===
- Ji Sung as Ha Woo-shin / Song Soo-hyun
- Seo Ji-hye as Eun Hye-soo
- Lee Soo-kyung as Kim Seo-hee

=== Supporting ===
==== People around Ha Woo-shin ====
- Heo Sung-tae as Choi Tae-seong (Chief Choi)
- Lee Geung-young as Kwon Jae-yoo
- Hwang Jung-min as Butler serving as President Kwon
- Seo Hyun-woo as Kwon Hyun-jo
- Lee Si-won as Secretary Yoon
- Shin Hyeon-seung as Lee Dong-rim
- Woo Hyun-joo as Mrs. Oh
- Go Yoon as Park Yo-won
- Choi Chan-ho as Kim Yo-won

==== People of Team A ====
- Oh Dae-hwan as Leader of Team A
- Park Hye-eun as Ace Sun
- Lee Ho-cheol as Section Chief Jung
- Jo Dong-in as Chief Lee

==== Special Investigation Headquarters ====
- Choi Deok-moon as Kang Hyuk-pil
- Jang Jin-hee as Miss Lee

==== Others ====
- Jo Sung-ha as Lee Chang-woo
- Jo Hyun-woo as Song Soon-ho
- Lee Do-yeop as A mysterious man who watches Song Soo-hyun.
- Jo Han-joon as The repairman came to fix Soo-hyun's bathroom.

=== Special appearances ===
- Ahn Bo-hyun as Kwon Min-jo
- Ko Kyu-pil as Gong Dae-chul, Head of the Special Division of the Jungam District Attorney's Office.

== Original soundtrack ==
=== Part 1 ===
Released July 28, 2022
No.	Title	Lyrics	Music	Artist	Length
1.	"Beat of My Heart"	Cali; Fabienne Holloway; Siggi; Viktoria Hansen	Cali; Fabienne Holloway; Siggi; Viktoria Hansen	Elodie Wave	3:20
2.	"Beat of My Heart" (Ref.)		Cali; Fabienne Holloway; Siggi; Viktoria Hansen		3:20
Total length:					6:40

=== Part 2 ===
Released August 4, 2022
No.	Title	Lyrics	Music	Artist	Length
1.	"Need You!"	Charlie Bean (Fab)	Charlie Bean (Fab); Attl (Fab)	Charlie Bean Works	3:08
2.	"Need You!" (Ref.)		Charlie Bean (Fab); Attl (Fab)		3:08
Total length:					6:16

=== Part 3 ===
Released on August 11, 2022
No.	Title	Lyrics	Music	Artist	Length
1.	"Darling You"	Kevin; Taylor	Kim Min; Taylor	Bernard Park	2:29
2.	"Darling You" (Ref.)		Kim Min; Taylor		2:29
Total length:					4:58

=== Part 4 ===
Released on August 18, 2022
No.	Title	Lyrics	Music	Artist	Length
1.	"By Your Side"	Jemma	Chicok; Jemma	Ha Hyun-sang	4:11
2.	"By Your Side" (Ref.)		Chicok; Jemma		4:11
Total length:					8:22

=== Part 5 ===
Released on September 1, 2022
No.	Title	Lyrics	Music	Artist	Length
1.	"All About You"	Id:Earth	Id:Earth; Kim Min	Katie	4:17
2.	"All About You" (Ref.)		Id:Earth; Kim Min		4:17
Total length:					8:34

=== Part 6 ===
Released on September 8, 2022
No.	Title	Lyrics	Music	Artist	Length
1.	"Rain On Me"	Donna	Donna; Cuzd	Johan Kim	3:41
2.	"Rain On Me" (Ref.)		Donna; Cuzd		3:41
Total length:					7:22

== Viewership ==
Adamas : South Korea viewers per episode (thousands)

Season	Episode number																Average
Season	1	2	3	4	5	6	7	8	9	10	11	12	13	14	15	16	Average
1	810	658	758	705	597	700	630	676	629	602	567	653	697	662	560	722	664

Source: Audience measurement performed nationwide by Nielsen Korea.

Average TV viewership ratings
Ep.	Original broadcast date	Average audience share (Nielsen Korea)	
Ep.	Original broadcast date	Nationwide	Seoul
1	July 27, 2022	3.502% (2nd)	3.607% (2nd)
2	July 28, 2022	2.849% (3rd)	3.004% (3rd)
3	August 3, 2022	3.339% (4th)	3.577% (3rd)
4	August 4, 2022	3.068% (3rd)	2.917% (3rd)
5	August 10, 2022	2.669% (4th)	2.826% (4th)
6	August 11, 2022	2.851% (4th)	2.586% (5th)
7	August 17, 2022	2.866% (5th)	2.935% (5th)
8	August 18, 2022	3.233% (4th)	3.057% (4th)
9	August 24, 2022	2.833% (2nd)	2.752% (3rd)
10	August 25, 2022	2.866% (2nd)	2.854% (2nd)
11	August 31, 2022	2.694% (2nd)	2.442% (3rd)
12	September 1, 2022	3.024% (3rd)	3.004% (3rd)
13	September 7, 2022	3.139% (3rd)	3.128% (3rd)
14	September 8, 2022	2.958% (2nd)	3.109% (2nd)
15	September 14, 2022	2.869% (3rd)	2.736% (3rd)
16	September 15, 2022	3.358% (2nd)	3.568% (2nd)
Average		3.007%	3.006%
In the table above, the blue numbers represent the lowest ratings and the red numbers represent the highest ratings.; This drama airs on a cable channel/pay TV which normally has a relatively smaller audience compared to free-to-air TV/public broadcasters (KBS, SBS, MBC, and EBS).
