= A Bloody Lucky Day =

2023 South Korean television series

- Promotional poster
- Hangul: 운수 오진 날
- Hanja: 運數 오진 날
- Lit.: The Day of Misdiagnosis
- RR: Unsu ojin nal
- MR: Unsu ojin nal
- Genre: Psychological drama; Thriller
- Based on: A Bloody Lucky Day by Aporia
- Developed by: Studio Dragon (planning); Paramount Global (production investment)
- Written by: Kim Min-sung; Song Han-na
- Directed by: Pil Gam-seong
- Starring: Lee Sung-min; Yoo Yeon-seok; Lee Jung-eun
- Music by: Kim Tae-seong
- Country of origin: South Korea
- Original language: Korean
- No. of episodes: 10

Production
- Executive producers: Jang Shin-ae (CP); Choi Sun-gyu; Huh Jae-mu
- Producers: Kim Jey-hyun; Oh Hwan-min; Kim Kyung-tae; Michelle Kwon
- Cinematography: Lee Zi-hoon
- Running time: 46–65 minutes
- Production companies: The Great Show; Studio N

Original release
- Network: TVING
- Release: October 4 – December 8, 2023
- Network: tvN
- Release: November 20 – December 19, 2023

A Bloody Lucky Day (Korean: 운수 오진 날) is a 2023 South Korean television series starring Lee Sung-min, Yoo Yeon-seok, and Lee Jung-eun based on a webtoon of the same name by Aporia, which was published on Naver. It is an original drama of TVING and is available for streaming on its platform. It also aired on tvN on November 20, 2023, every Monday and Tuesday at 22:30 (KST).

The series was divided into two parts: Part 1 was released on November 24, 2023, and Part 2 was released on December 8, 2023, at 12:00 (KST).

A Bloody Lucky Day premiered at the On Screen section of the 28th Busan International Film Festival on October 4, 2023, where two of ten episodes were screened.

== Synopsis ==
Oh Taek (Lee Sung-min), an ordinary taxi driver, is offered a high fee to take a passenger to Mokpo. He reluctantly agrees, but soon realizes that his passenger is a serial killer. Oh Taek must now embark on a terrifying drive, using all of his cunning and resourcefulness to survive.

== Cast ==
=== Main ===
- Lee Sung-min as Oh Taek
- Yoo Yeon-seok as Geum Hyeok-soo
- Lee Jung-eun as Hwang Soon-kyu

=== Supporting ===
- Ki Eun-soo as Koo Chae-ri
- Han Dong-hee as Yoon Se-na
- Tae Hang-ho as Yang Seung-taek
- Lee Kang-ji as Soon-kyu's son
- Joo Yeon-woo as Gong Cheon-seok
- Oh Hye-won as No Hyun-ji
- Jung Man-sik as Kim Joong-min

== Production and release ==
On April 19, 2023, Paramount+ and TVING announced the production of the series.

The series first premiered on TVING in South Korea before it was available globally on Paramount+ in the U.S., Canada, the U.K., Australia, Latin Americas, Brazil, Italy, France, Germany, Switzerland and Austria on February 1, 2024. Paramount Global Content Distribution handled global sales outside South Korea, Japan and Taiwan.

On October 18, 2023, it was announced that the series would be broadcast on tvN ahead of its released on TVING. The series also aired on tvN Asia under the agreement with Paramount.

== Reception ==
=== Viewership ===
A Bloody Lucky Day : South Korea viewers per episode (thousands)

Season	Episode number										Average
Season	1	2	3	4	5	6	7	8	9	10	Average
1	860	634	467	398	370	393	357	483	N/A	N/A	495

Source: Audience measurement performed nationwide by Nielsen Korea. (Note: The average rating and viewership was calculated based on the published data. The exact average rating and viewership are unknown due to multiple ratings and viewerships missing.)

Average TV viewership ratings
Ep.	Original broadcast date	Average audience share (Nielsen Korea)	
Ep.	Original broadcast date	Nationwide	Seoul
1	November 20, 2023	4.109% (1st)	4.746% (1st)
2	November 21, 2023	2.656% (2nd)	2.994% (2nd)
3	November 27, 2023	2.135% (1st)	2.315% (1st)
4	November 28, 2023	2.146% (2nd)	2.463% (2nd)
5	December 4, 2023	1.920% (3rd)	2.135% (2nd)
6	December 5, 2023	2.389% (2nd)	2.468% (2nd)
7	December 11, 2023	2.105% (2nd)	2.285% (2nd)
8	December 12, 2023	2.668% (2nd)	3.330% (2nd)
9	December 18, 2023	2.17% (1st)	N/A
10	December 19, 2023	2.41% (2nd)	N/A
Average		2.471%	2.842%
In the table above, the blue numbers represent the lowest ratings and the red numbers represent the highest ratings.; This series airs on a cable channel/pay TV which normally has a relatively smaller audience compared to free-to-air TV/public broadcasters (KBS, SBS, MBC and EBS).

=== Accolades ===
Name of the award ceremony, year presented, category, nominee of the award, and the result of the nomination
Award ceremony	Year	Category	Nominee / Work	Result	Ref.
Baeksang Arts Awards	2024	Best Actor	Yoo Yeon-seok	Nominated	
Baeksang Arts Awards	2024	Best Supporting Actress	Lee Jung-eun	Nominated	
