= 54th Baeksang Arts Awards =

2018 edition of award ceremony

- Sponsored by: Star Century
- Date: May 3, 2018
- Site: Hall D, COEX, Seoul
- Hosted by: Shin Dong-yup; Bae Suzy; Park Bo-gum
- Organised by: Ilgan Sports; JTBC Plus

Highlights
- Grand Prize – Film: 1987: When the Day Comes (film)
- Grand Prize – TV: Stranger (drama)
- Website: http://www.baeksangawards.co.kr/

Television/radio coverage
- Network: JTBC
- Viewership: 2.9% (Nielsen Korea)

The 54th Baeksang Arts Awards (Korean: 제54회 백상예술대상) ceremony was held on May 3, 2018, at Hall D, COEX in Seoul. Hosted by Shin Dong-yup, Bae Suzy and Park Bo-gum, it was broadcast live on JTBC. Organised by Ilgan Sports and JTBC Plus, it is South Korea's only awards ceremony which recognises excellence in both film and television.

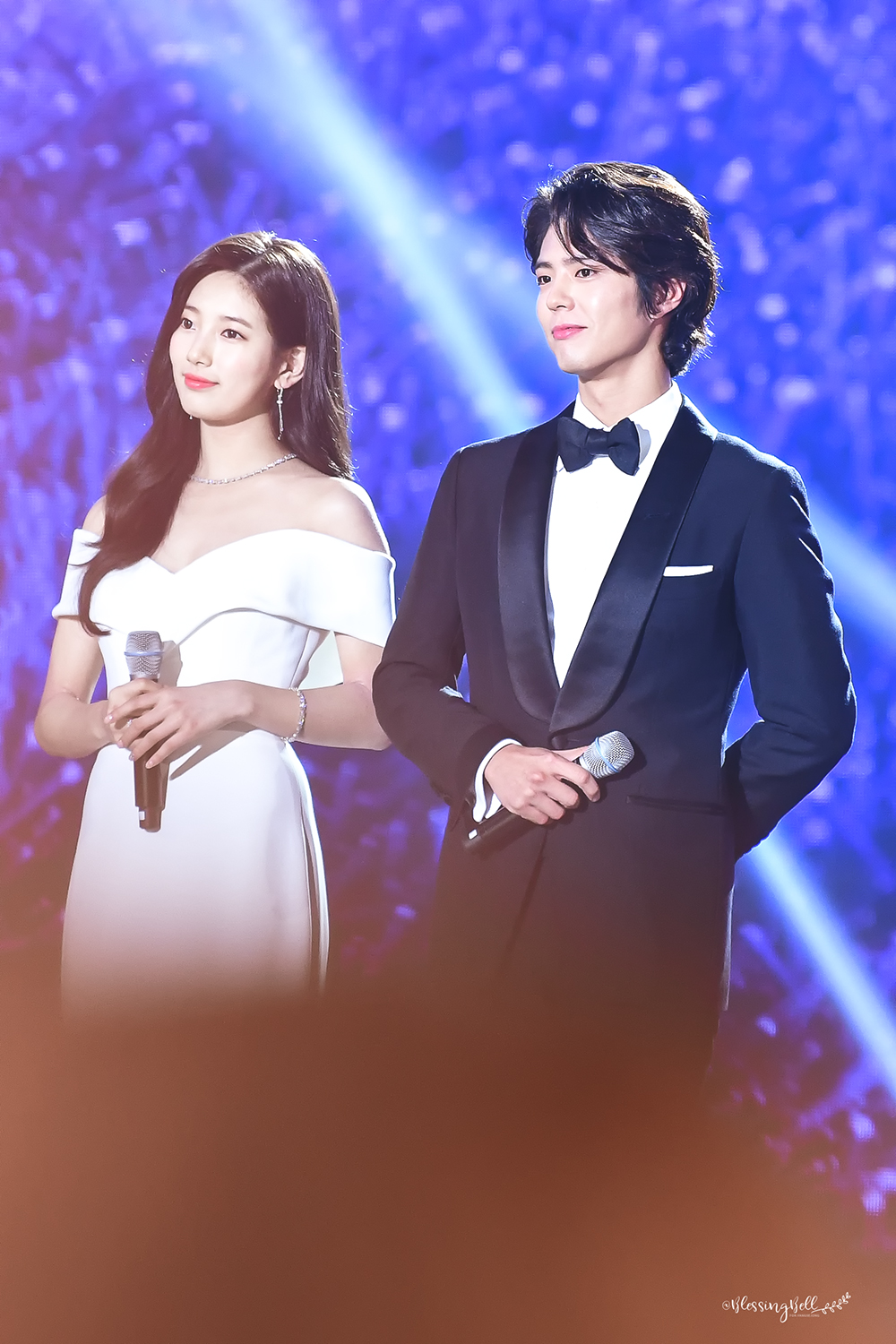
Hosts Park Bo-gum (R) and Bae Suzy

The highest honors of the night, Grand Prize (Daesang), were awarded to the film 1987: When the Day Comes in the film division and the drama series Stranger in the television division.

== Winners and nominees ==
- Winners are listed first and highlighted in **boldface**.
  - Nominees

=== Film ===
**Grand Prize**	**Best Film**
**1987: When the Day Comes (film)**; A Taxi Driver (film); Kim Yoon-seok (actor) – 1987: When the Day Comes, The Fortress; Song Kang-ho (actor) – A Taxi Driver	**The Fortress**; 1987: When the Day Comes; Anarchist from Colony; Along with the Gods: The Two Worlds; A Taxi Driver
**Best Director**	**Best New Director**
**Kim Yong-hwa – Along with the Gods: The Two Worlds**; Yang Woo-suk – Steel Rain; Jang Joon-hwan – 1987: When the Day Comes; Jang Hoon – A Taxi Driver; Hwang Dong-hyuk – The Fortress	**Kang Yun-seong – The Outlaws**; Moon So-ri – The Running Actress; Shin Joon – Yongsoon; Cho Hyun-hoon – Jane; Jeon Go-woon – Microhabitat
**Best Actor**	**Best Actress**
**Kim Yoon-seok – 1987: When the Day Comes**; Ma Dong-seok – The Outlaws; Sul Kyung-gu – The Merciless; Song Kang-ho – A Taxi Driver; Jung Woo-sung – Steel Rain	**Na Moon-hee – I Can Speak**; Kim Ok-vin – The Villainess; Kim Tae-ri – Little Forest; Son Ye-jin – Be with You; Choi Hee-seo – Anarchist from Colony
**Best Supporting Actor**	**Best Supporting Actress**
**Park Hee-soon – 1987: When the Day Comes**; Kim Dong-wook – Along with the Gods: The Two Worlds; Kim Hee-won – The Merciless; Jo Woo-jin – Steel Rain; Jin Seon-kyu – The Outlaws	**Lee Soo-kyung – Heart Blackened**; Yeom Hye-ran – I Can Speak; Esom – Warriors of the Dawn; Lee Hanee – Heart Blackened; Jeon Hye-jin – The Merciless
**Best New Actor**	**Best New Actress**
**Koo Kyo-hwan – Jane**; Kim Sung-kyu – The Outlaws; Kim Jun-han – Anarchist from Colony; Lee Ga-sub – The Seeds of Violence; Heo Sung-tae – The Outlaws	**Choi Hee-seo – Anarchist from Colony**; Nana – The Swindlers; Lee Soo-kyung – Yongsoon; Lee Joo-young – Jane; Jin Ki-joo – Little Forest
**Best Screenplay**	**Technical Award**
**Kim Kyung-chan – 1987: When the Day Comes**; Kang Yoon-sung – The Outlaws; Eom Yu-na – A Taxi Driver; Yang Woo-suk, Jung Ha-yong – Steel Rain; Hwang Seong-gu – Anarchist from Colony	**Jin Jong-hyun (VFX) – Along with the Gods: The Two Worlds**

==== Films with multiple awards ====
The following films received multiple awards:

Wins	Films
4	1987: When the Day Comes
2	Along with the Gods: The Two Worlds

==== Films with multiple nominations ====
The following films received multiple nominations:

Nominations	Films
6	The Outlaws
5	1987: When the Day Comes
5	Anarchist from Colony
4	A Taxi Driver
4	Along with the Gods: The Two Worlds
4	Steel Rain
3	Jane
2	Heart Blackened
2	I Can Speak
2	Little Forest
2	The Fortress
2	Yongsoon

=== Television ===
**Grand Prize**
**Stranger (drama)**; Cho Seung-woo (actor) – Stranger
**Best Drama**	**Best Director**
**Mother**; Misty; Stranger; Fight for My Way; My Golden Life	**Kim Yoon-chul – The Lady in Dignity**; Kim Cheol-kyu – Mother; Mo Wan-il – Misty; Shin Won-ho – Prison Playbook; Ahn Gil-ho – Stranger
**Best Entertainment Program**	**Best Educational Show**
**Hyori's Homestay**; I Live Alone; The Fishermen and the City; Welcome, First Time in Korea?; Youn's Kitchen 2	**Dance Sports Girls**; Unanswered Questions; I Am a Natural Person; Pilgrimage; There Are No Bad Dogs in the World
**Best Actor**	**Best Actress**
**Cho Seung-woo – Stranger**; Kim Sang-joong – The Rebel; Park Seo-joon – Fight for My Way; Jang Hyuk – Money Flower; Chun Ho-jin – My Golden Life	**Kim Nam-joo – Misty**; Kim Sun-a – The Lady in Dignity; Kim Hee-sun – The Lady in Dignity; Shin Hye-sun – My Golden Life; Lee Bo-young – Mother
**Best Supporting Actor**	**Best Supporting Actress**
**Park Ho-san – Prison Playbook**; Bong Tae-gyu – Return; Ahn Jae-hong – Fight for My Way; Yoo Jae-myung – Stranger; Jung Sang-hoon – The Lady in Dignity	**Ye Ji-won – Should We Kiss First?**; Na Young-hee – My Golden Life; Ra Mi-ran – Avengers Social Club; Song Ha-yoon – Fight for My Way; Jeon Hye-jin – Misty
**Best New Actor**	**Best New Actress**
**Yang Se-jong – Temperature of Love**; Kim Jung-hyun – School 2017; Park Hae-soo – Prison Playbook; Woo Do-hwan – Save Me; Lee Kyu-hyung – Stranger	**Heo Yool – Mother**; Kim Da-som – Band of Sisters; Kim Se-jeong – School 2017; Seo Eun-soo – My Golden Life; Won Jin-ah – Rain or Shine
**Best Male Variety Performer**	**Best Female Variety Performer**
**Seo Jang-hoon – Knowing Bros, Same Bed, Different Dreams 2: You Are My Destiny**; Kwon Hyuk-soo – Saturday Night Live Korea; Yoo Byung-jae – Omniscient Interfering View; Lee Sang-min – My Little Old Boy, Knowing Bros; Jun Hyun-moo – I Live Alone	**Song Eun-i – Omniscient Interfering View, Pan-beol-ryeo**; Kang Yu-mi – Gag Concert; Kim Sook – Video Star; Park Na-rae – I Live Alone; Lee Soo-ji – Gag Concert
**Best Screenplay**	**Technical Award**
**Lee Soo-yeon – Stranger**; Baek Mi-kyung – The Lady in Dignity; Lim Sang-choon – Fight for My Way; Jung Bo-hoon – Prison Playbook; Jeong Seo-kyeong – Mother	**Choi Sung-woo (Filming) – Journey on Foot**

==== Programs with multiple awards ====
The following television programs received multiple awards:

Wins	Television programs
3	Stranger
2	Mother

==== Programs with multiple nominations ====
The following television programs received multiple nominations:

Nominations	Television programs
6	Stranger
5	Fight for My Way
5	Mother
5	My Golden Life
5	The Lady in Dignity
4	Misty
4	Prison Playbook
2	School 2017

=== Special awards ===
Awards	Recipient
**Star Century Most Popular Actor**	Jung Hae-in
**Star Century Most Popular Actress**	Bae Suzy
**Bazaar Icon Award**	Nana
