= Heart Blackened =

2017 film by Jung Ji-woo

- Theatrical release poster
- Hangul: 침묵
- Hanja: 沈默
- RR: Chimmuk
- MR: Ch'immuk
- Directed by: Jung Ji-woo
- Screenplay by: Jung Ji-woo
- Based on: Silent Witness by Fei Xing
- Produced by: Syd Lim
- Starring: Choi Min-sik; Park Shin-hye; Ryu Jun-yeol; Lee Hanee
- Cinematography: Kim Tae-kyung
- Edited by: Wang Sung-ik
- Music by: Yonrimog
- Production company: Yong Film
- Distributed by: CJ Entertainment
- Release date: November 2, 2017
- Running time: 125 minutes
- Country: South Korea
- Language: Korean
- Box office: US$3.6 million

Heart Blackened (Korean: 침묵; RR: Chimmuk; lit. 'Silence') is a 2017 South Korean drama film starring Choi Min-sik, Park Shin-hye, Ryu Jun-yeol, and Lee Hanee. It is a remake of the Chinese film Silent Witness.

== Plot ==
Im Tae-san thought he had it all — wealth, love, and success. On what felt like a great day, Yoo-na, his fiancée and a famous singer, is murdered. Shockingly, his own daughter, Im Mi-ra, is named as the prime suspect.

With the public's attention fixated on the case, Tae-san is determined to prove his daughter's innocence even though she has no memory of what happened that night. Rejecting the most elite legal team, he instead chooses Choi Hee-jung, a young lawyer who genuinely believes in Mi-ra's innocence and will stand by her.

A fierce courtroom battle ensues over the missing seven hours Mi-ra cannot remember. Then, the case takes an unexpected turn when a fan of Yoo-na, Kim Dong-myung, emerges holding the lost CCTV footage from that night.

== Cast ==
- Choi Min-sik as Im Tae-san
- Park Shin-hye as Choi Hee-jeong
- Ryu Jun-yeol as Kim Dong-myeong
- Lee Hanee as Park Yoo-na
- Park Hae-joon as Dong Seong-sik
- Jo Han-chul as Jeong Seung-gil
- Lee Soo-kyung as Im Mi-ra
- Park Gyu-young as Female college student
- Oh Ah-yeon as Overseas Korean
- Kim Soo-jin as Presiding judge
- Park Ho-san as Chief Prosecutor

== Production ==
Filming wrapped after 4 months of shooting on February 7, 2017, in Bangkok, Thailand.

== Awards and nominations ==
Awards	Category	Recipient	Result	Ref.
54th Baeksang Arts Awards	Best Supporting Actress	Lee Hanee	Nominated	
54th Baeksang Arts Awards	Best Supporting Actress	Lee Soo-kyung	Won	
