= Miracle: Letters to the President =

2021 South Korean romantic drama film

- Theatrical release poster
- Hangul: 기적
- Hanja: 奇蹟
- RR: Gijeok
- MR: Kijŏk
- Directed by: Lee Jang-hoon
- Screenplay by: Lee Jang-hoon; Son Joo-yeon
- Produced by: Yook Kyung-sam
- Starring: Park Jeong-min; Lee Sung-min; Lim Yoona; Lee Soo-kyung
- Cinematography: Kim Tae-soo
- Edited by: Park Kyung-soon
- Music by: Kim Tae-seong
- Production company: Blossom Pictures
- Distributed by: Lotte Entertainment
- Release date: September 15, 2021
- Running time: 117 minutes
- Country: South Korea
- Language: Korean
- Box office: US$5.4 million

Miracle: Letters to the President (Korean: 기적; RR: Gijeok) is a 2021 South Korean romantic drama film directed and co-written by Lee Jang-hoon for Blossom Pictures. Starring Park Jeong-min, Lee Sung-min, Lim Yoona, and Lee Soo-kyung, the film is based on a true story of a high school mathematics genius Joon-kyeong. Set in the 1980s in a remote township of North Gyeongsang Province, it tells the story of establishing a simple, privately owned train station.

The film was released theatrically on September 15, 2021, coinciding with Chuseok festival holidays.

== Premise ==
This fictionalized film is based on the true story of a family in the 1980s living in a roadless remote area of North Gyeongsang Province.

Tae-yoon, an engineer, has as his life goal setting up a train station in his village, which has tracks but no station. His son Joon-gyeong is a high school math prodigy. He works with his girlfriend Ra-hee, his older sister Bo-gyeong and the village residents to establish in 1988 a small train station that is privately owned and the first of its kind.

== Cast ==
- Park Jeong-min as Jung Joon-kyeong
  - Kim Kang-hoon as young Joon-kyeong
- Lee Sung-min as Jung Tae-yoon, Joon-kyeong's father
- Lim Yoona as Song Ra-hee
- Lee Soo-kyung as Jung Bo-kyeong, Joon-kyeong's older sister
- Ko Chang-seok as Ra-hee's father
- Jung Moon Sung as Kim Yong Hwan, Joon-kyeong's physics teacher
- Shim So-young as villager
- Jo Yeon-hee as villager

== Production ==
On 9 June 2020, it was reported that Park Jeong-min, Lim Yoona and Lee Sung-min were considering the proposal of appearing in the film positively. On 25 August 2020, the cast was confirmed.

Principal photography began on August 2, 2020 The filming location was Gangwon Province, South Korea. The film set in 1988, was shot in an open set and filmed around Yucheon-ri, Jeongseon, and various other places in the province such as a house in Nakcheon-ri, Dogye Dongdeok branch school in Samcheok, High1 Chuchu Park, Wonju Ganhyeon Tourist Site, and Wonju Rail Bike.

== Release ==
Lotte Entertainment released a special video clip and handwritten letters of Park Jeong-min and Lim Yoona to promote the film. It was scheduled to premiere in June 2021 but the release was postponed due to the COVID-19 pandemic. It was released theatrically on September 15, 2021, coinciding with Chuseok festival.

The film was screened at 1st Ulsan International Film Festival on December 19, 2021. It was also selected at 24th edition of Far East Film Festival held from April 22 to 30 2022, where it won the Golden Mulberry award.

== Reception ==
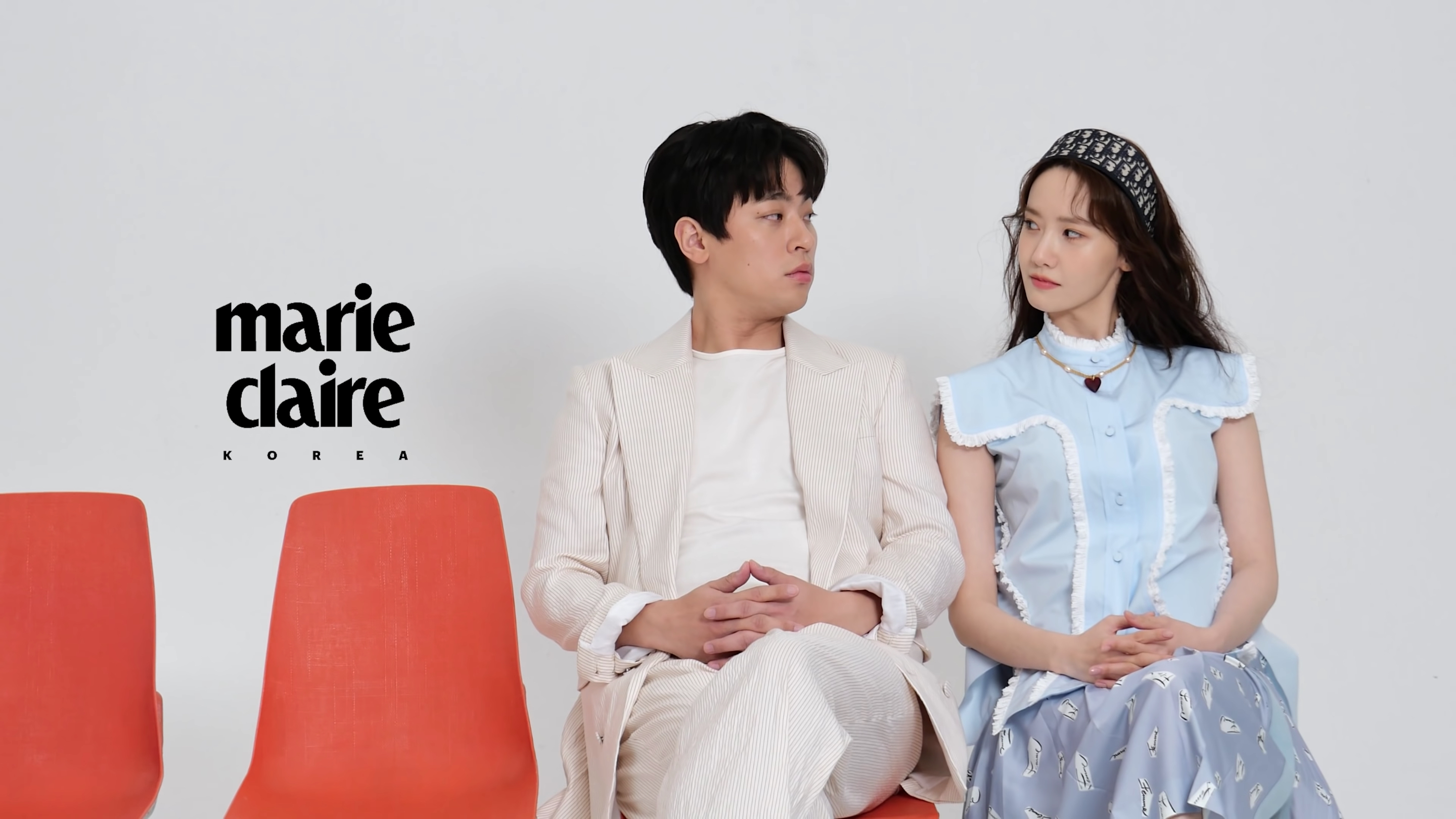
Park Jeong-min and Im Yoon-ah promoting the film on Marie Claire Korea in September 2021

=== Box office ===
The film was released on September 15, 2021, on 1198 screens. As of December 31, 2021, the film has grossed $4,658,483 from 717,163 admissions, making it the 8th highest grossing South Korean film of 2021.

=== Critical response ===
Kang Min-kyung of Star News reviewing the film lauded the performance of ensemble, especially acting of Lee Soo-kyung, saying, "Soo-kyung is the trump card and core of The Miracle". She liked the scenic beauty of locales and wrote, "Their [Park Jeong-min, Lee Seong-min, Lim Yoon-ah, and Lee Su-kyung] ensemble and the beautiful background where you can feel the four seasons from spring to summer, autumn, and winter add to the immersion and leave a lasting impression in the heart." Kang wrote about the film in the opening of review, "It touches the hearts of the viewers slowly and permeates. A genius boy's 'miracle' brings laughter and sometimes tears. This is the story of the movie The Miracle." Kim Seong-Hyun reviewing the film for YTN wrote that the performance of the actors was excellent but, "despite the strong performances of these actors, the film story is overly dramatic and weakens the narrative link. The conflict structure in the film and the process of resolving it are to the point that it feels forced and artificial.." Concluding the review Seong-Hyun said, " The Miracle ends with Richard Sanderson's famous song "Reality", which was also used in the movie La Boum in the 80s. The lyrics of the song 'Dream is my reality' are as beautiful as Junkyung's dream, but it is not enough to erase the bitter taste."

Kim Ji-eun of Newsis in her review praised the performances of Park Jeong-min, Lim Yoona, Lee Seong-min and Lee Soo-kyung, writing, "The character shines with the strong performances of the actors." She opined that the film set in 1980s have "captured the nostalgic sensibility of that era", and "the sentimental atmosphere of a rural village without a train station, with beautiful scenery and colors." Kim wrote that the "warmth" of narrative softly pervaded "with the landscape in harmony with nature". She concluded, "It started out as a simple station, but in the end it is a story about a dream."

Jung Yu-jin of News1 praised the performances of Park Jeong-min, Lim Yoona, Lee Seong-min and specially, Lee Soo-kyung, who in her opinion "is the heart of the film." Commenting on the mixing of filial relationship, first love of high school boy and fantasy, she said, "director Lee Jang-hoon mixed these familiar ingredients with a different seasoning called 'Fantasy' in an unfamiliar bowl based on a true story called 'Simple Station Making', and finished it well enough to eat. Jung felt that "the warm sensibility and humor that flows throughout the film" made "The Miracle, a cute and moist growth narrative that brightens the heart."

Kim Ye-eun of Export News reviewing the film said, "The Miracle, which started with laughter and flowed into emotion, stimulates the tear glands with the warm story of these families. A strong reversal appears and sometimes adds to the emotion."

=== Accolades ===
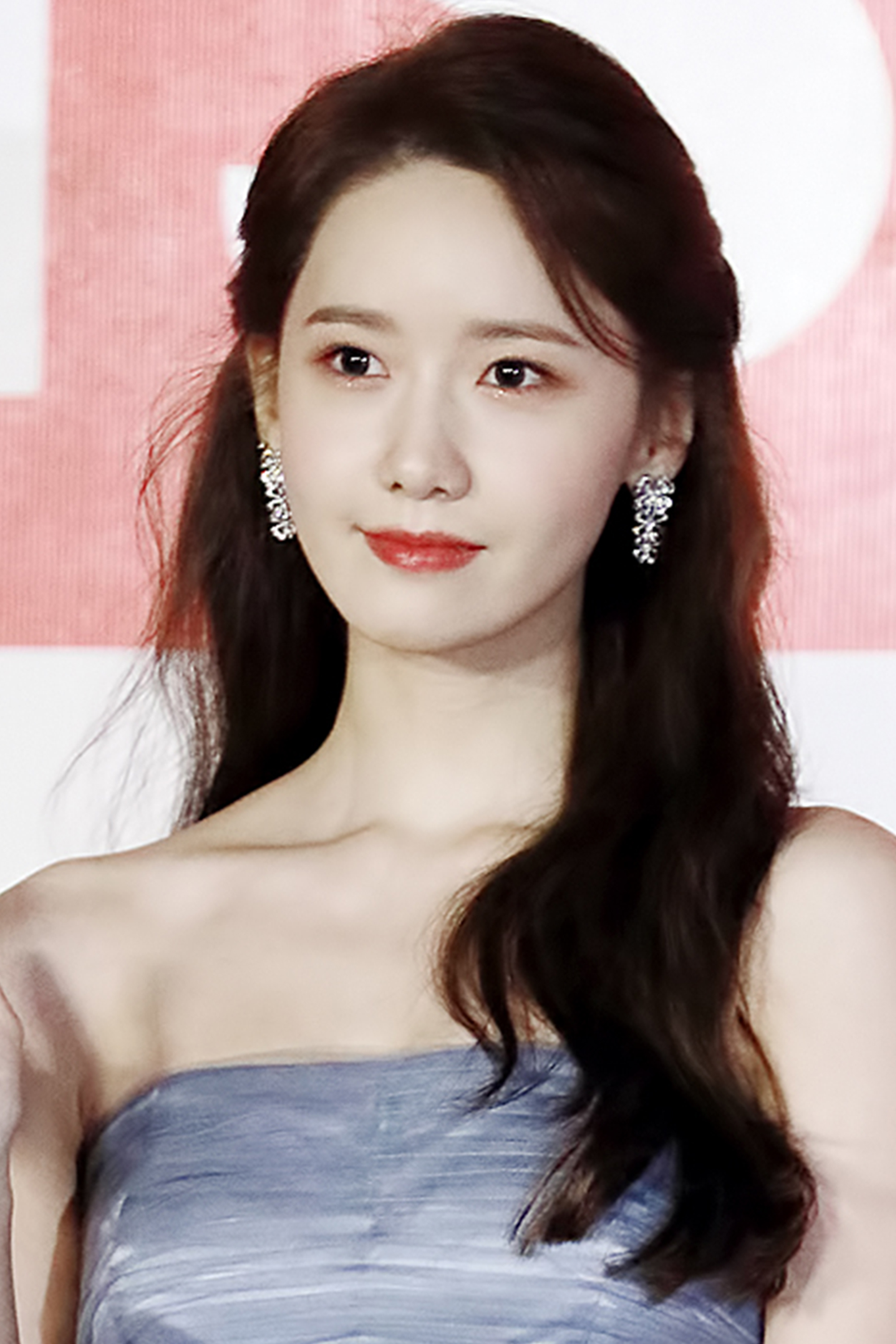
YoonA (Im Yoon-ah) winner of Popular Star Award at the 42nd Blue Dragon Film Awards

Year	Award	Category	Recipient(s)	Result	Ref.
2021	42nd Blue Dragon Film Awards	Best Screenplay	Lee Jang-hoon, Son Joo-yeon	Nominated	
2021	42nd Blue Dragon Film Awards	Best Actress	Lim Yoona	Nominated	
2021	42nd Blue Dragon Film Awards	Popular Star Award	Lim Yoona	Won	
2021	42nd Blue Dragon Film Awards	Best Supporting Actor	Lee Sung-min	Nominated	
2021	42nd Blue Dragon Film Awards	Best Supporting Actress	Lee Soo-kyung	Nominated	
2021	42nd Blue Dragon Film Awards	Best Art Direction	Kim Hui-jin	Nominated	
2021	42nd Blue Dragon Film Awards	Best Music	Kim Tae-seong	Nominated	
2022	58th Baeksang Arts Awards	Best Film	Miracle: Letters to the President	Nominated	
2022	58th Baeksang Arts Awards	Best Director	Lee Jang-hoon	Nominated	
2022	58th Baeksang Arts Awards	Best Actress	Lim Yoona	Nominated	
2022	58th Baeksang Arts Awards	Best Supporting Actress	Lee Soo-kyung	Won	
2022	24th Udine Far East Film Festival	Golden Mulberry: Audience Award	Miracle: Letters to the President	Won	
2022	27th Chunsa Film Art Awards	Best Supporting Actress	Lee Soo-kyung	Nominated	
2022	31st Buil Film Awards	Best Supporting Actress	Lee Soo-kyung	Won	
2022	17th Festival du Film Coréen à Paris	Best Feature Film: Audience Award	Miracle: Letters to the President	Won	
