= Lee Soo-kyung (actress, born 1996) =

South Korean actress (born 1996)

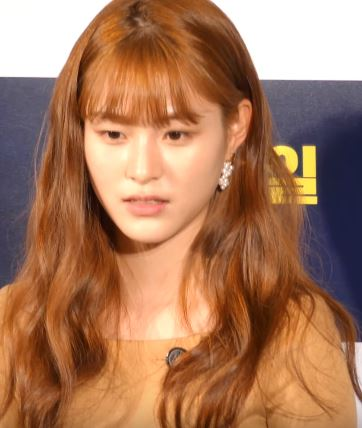
- Lee in 2019
- Born: Lee Soo-kyung; October 24, 1996 (age 30); Seoul, South Korea
- Occupation: Actress
- Years active: 2012–present
- Agent: Varo Entertainment (2023–present)

Korean name
- Hangul: 이수경
- Hanja: 李秀慶
- RR: I Sugyeong
- MR: I Sugyŏng

Lee Soo-kyung (Korean: 이수경; born October 24, 1996) is a South Korean actress. She is the youngest two-time winner of the Baeksang Arts Awards for Best Supporting Actress with the films Heart Blackened (2017) and Miracle: Letters to the President (2021). She made her television debut in the series Hogu's Love in 2015 and starred in Adamas (2022) and Love in the Big City (2024).

== Career ==
Lee enrolled in an acting school as part of her parents' wish for Lee to learn various skills like playing musical instruments, etc. She was then chosen to lead 2012 short film In the Summer. Her mainstream debut was in 2015, with both crime film Coin Locker Girl as pink-haired rogue girl living in Incheon's Chinatown and tvN's romantic comedy television series Hogu's Love as the protagonist's twin sister.

In 2017, Lee received critical acclaim for two films: a romantic coming-of-age about a schoolgirl who falls for her coach Yongsoon in which Lee got nominated for several major film awards, and a crime legal Heart Blackened in which her role as a murder suspect daughter of a powerful businessman earned her the first win and youngest winner on record of Baeksang Arts Awards for Best Supporting Actress.

Lee returned to small screen with 2018 SBS workplace drama Where Stars Land, as the youngest team member of Incheon International Airport's Security Service.

Lee was cast in one series and one film in 2021. She acted as a cold and heavily-pressured law school student in JTBC's legal crime Law School, and as a tough firstborn daughter of the family main cast in the film that brings a second Baeksang Arts Awards for Lee 4 years after her first win, docudrama Miracle: Letters to the President.

In 2022, Lee acted in tvN's crime mystery Adamas as a TV reporter who hides a secret of being a murder witness in her childhood.

== Filmography ==
=== Film ===
Year	Title	Role	Notes	Ref.
2012	In the Summer	Soon-young		
2013	The Pitapatting	Soo-kyung		
2014	Broken	Min-ki's class female student		
2015	Coin Locker Girl	Ssong		
2016	Familyhood	Sun-young		
2017	The Mayor	Byun Ah-reum		
2017	Yongsoon	Yong-soon		
2017	Heart Blackened	Im Mi-ra		
2017	Trivial Matters	Eun-ha	Short film	
2019	The Odd Family: Zombie On Sale	Park Hae-gul		
2020	Mr. Zoo: The Missing VIP	So-jin	Cameo	
2021	Miracle: Letters to the President	Bo-kyung		
2022	Yaksha: Ruthless Operations	Mun Ju-yeon	Netflix Film	
2024	Dead Man	Gong Hee-joo		
2024	Jeongdong-gil	Jung In	Short Film	

=== Television series ===
Year	Title	Role	Notes	Ref.
2015	Hogu's Love	Kang Ho-kyung		
2015	Drama Special	Nam Seung-hee	Episode: "In Search of Argenta"	
2015	Reply 1988	Lee Soo-kyung	Cameo (Episode 8)	
2016	Kidnapping Assemblyman Mr. Clean	Seul-gi		
2018	Where Stars Land	Na Young-joo		
2021	Law School	Kang Sol B		
2022	Adamas	Kim Seo-hee		
2024	Love in the Big City	Mi-ae		
2025	When Life Gives You Tangerines	Bu Hyeon-suk		
2026	Doctor on the Edge	Um Jeong-seon		

== Accolades ==
=== Awards and nominations ===
Name of the award ceremony, year presented, category, nominee of the award, and the result of the nomination
Award ceremony	Year	Category	Nominee / Work	Result	Ref.
Baeksang Arts Awards	2018	Best Supporting Actress – Film	Heart Blackened	Won	
Baeksang Arts Awards	2018	Best New Actress – Film	Yongsoon	Nominated	
Baeksang Arts Awards	2022	Best Supporting Actress – Film	Miracle: Letters to the President	Won	
Blue Dragon Film Awards	2017	Best New Actress	Yongsoon	Nominated	
Blue Dragon Film Awards	2021	Best Supporting Actress	Miracle: Letters to the President	Nominated	
Buil Film Awards	2017	Best New Actress	Yongsoon	Nominated	
Buil Film Awards	2022	Best Supporting Actress	Miracle: Letters to the President	Won	
Chunsa Film Art Awards	2018	Best New Actress	Yongsoon	Nominated	
Chunsa Film Art Awards	2022	Best Supporting Actress	Miracle: Letters to the President	Nominated	
Grand Bell Awards	2017	Best New Actress	Yongsoon	Nominated	
SBS Drama Awards	2018	Best New Actress	Where Stars Land	Nominated	
Women in Film Korea Awards	2017	Best New Actress	Yongsoon	Won	

=== Listicles ===
Name of publisher, year listed, name of listicle, and placement
Publisher	Year	Listicle	Placement	Ref.
Cine21	2021	New Actress to watch out for in 2022	6th (Note: Tied with Go Min-si, Park Eun-bin, Keum Sae-rok, Joo Hyun-young, Park Gyu-young, Lee Soo-kyung, Roh Yoon-seo, Gong Seung-yeon, Lee Se-young, IU, Keum Sae-rok, Park Ji-hu, Han So-hee, Jung Ji-so, Bang Min-ah, Jeon Jong-seo, Roh Jeong-eui)	
