= The Journey to Gyeongju =

2025 film by Kim Mi-jo

- Theatrical release poster
- Hangul: 경주기행
- RR: Gyeongju gihaeng
- MR: Kyŏngju kihaeng
- Directed by: Kim Mi-jo
- Written by: Kim Mi-jo
- Produced by: Park Sun-hye
- Starring: Lee Jung-eun; Gong Hyo-jin; Park So-dam; Lee Yeon; Byun Yo-han
- Cinematography: Lee Hyung-bin
- Edited by: Kim Sun-min
- Music by: Kim Hae-won
- Production company: Studio High Five
- Distributed by: Lotte Entertainment
- Release dates: October 18, 2025 (HIFF); August 26, 2026 (South Korea)
- Running time: 111 minutes
- Country: South Korea
- Language: Korean
- Box office: $2.4 million

The Journey to Gyeongju (Korean: 경주기행) is a 2025 South Korean black comedy thriller film written and directed by Kim Mi-jo. The film stars Lee Jung-eun, Gong Hyo-jin, Park So-dam, Lee Yeon, and Byun Yo-han. It premiered on October 18, 2025 at the Hawai'i International Film Festival, followed by its theatrical release in South Korea on August 26, 2026.

== Synopsis ==
Eight years after her youngest daughter Gyeong-ju was killed during a high school field trip, Ok-sil travels to Gyeongju with her three older daughters, Jang-ju, Young-ju, and Dong-ju, to mark Gyeong-ju's birthday. The family wears matching T-shirts and presents their trip as an ordinary family vacation. However, an unknown man is being held in the trunk of their van. The family has secretly tracked down the man they believe was responsible for Gyeong-ju's death and intends to kill him as an act of revenge, using the trip as an alibi.

== Cast ==
- Lee Jung-eun as Ok-sil
- Gong Hyo-jin as Jang-ju
- Park So-dam as Young-ju
- Lee Yeon as Dong-ju
- Byun Yo-han as Baek Sang-hyun
- Hwang Hyun-jung as Gyeong-ju
- Kim Hak-sun as Mu-il
- Kim Young-sung as Seok-man

== Production ==
=== Casting ===
In January 2024, Korean media outlets reported that Gong Hyo-jin, Park So-dam, Kim Young-sung, Lee Yeon, and Lee Jung-eun had been cast in The Journey to Gyeongju, a new film written and directed by director Kim Mi-jo. That August, it was officially announced that Lee Jung-eun, Gong Hyo-jin, Park So-dam, and Lee Yeon would star in the film.

=== Filming ===
Principal photography began in April 2024, with filming taking place in locations including Gyeongju, South Korea. On August 13 of the same year, it was announced that filming had wrapped.

== Release ==
The Journey to Gyeongju had its world premiere at the 45th Hawaiʻi International Film Festival on October 18, 2025. It subsequently screened at the 24th Florence Korea Film Fest in March 26, 2026, where it received the Audience Award. The film was also selected for the 30th Fantasia International Film Festival and the 6th Korean Film Festival Barcelona.

The film was officially released in South Korea on August 26, 2026 by Lotte Entertainment.

== Reception ==
=== Box office ===
On its opening day, The Journey to Gyeongju attracted 36,796 admissions, ranking third at the South Korean box office and first among South Korean films. According to the Korean Film Council's integrated computer network, The Journey to Gyeongju recorded 359,680 admissions in South Korea and grossed US$2,290,947.

=== Accolades ===
Award	Year	Category	Recipient(s)	Result	Ref.
Florence Korea Film Fest	2026	Audience Choice Award	The Journey to Gyeongju	Won	
