= Snowball (2020 film) =

2020 South Korean drama film

- Release poster
- Hangul: 최선의 삶
- Hanja: 最善의 삶
- RR: Choeseonui sam
- MR: Ch'oesŏnŭi sam
- Directed by: Lee Woo-jeong
- Screenplay by: Lee Woo-jeong
- Based on: The Best Life by Lim Sol-ah
- Produced by: Kim Hyung-dae; Baek Jae-ho
- Starring: Bang Min-ah; Shim Dal-gi; Han Sung-min
- Cinematography: Lee Jae-u
- Edited by: Han Young-kyu
- Music by: Lee Minwhee
- Production company: Milestone Co.
- Distributed by: Atnine Film Co., Ltd.
- Release dates: October 2020 (BIFF); September 1, 2021 (South Korea)
- Running time: 110 minutes
- Country: South Korea
- Language: Korean
- Box office: est. US$78,076

Snowball (Korean: 최선의 삶; lit. 'Best Life') is a 2020 South Korean youth drama film, directed by Lee Woo-jeong and starring Bang Min-ah, Shim Dal-gi, and Han Sung-min. The film adapted from The Best Life by Lim Solah, tells the story of three high school best friends who run away to find answers to their perceived troubles. It was premiered at 25th Busan International Film Festival held from October 21 to 30, 2020. It was released theatrically on September 1, 2021.

== Cast ==
- Bang Min-ah as Kang-i
- Shim Dal-gi as Ah-ram
- Han Sung-min as Yeon So-yeong
- Yoon Hye-ri

== Production ==
On 30 October 2019, Bang Min-ah was confirmed to appear in the film based on the novel The Best Life by Lim Sol-ah. The novel has won the 4th Munhakdongne University Novel Awards in 2015.

== Release ==
Snowball was premiered at 25th Busan International Film Festival held from October 21 to 30, 2020. It was invited at the 20th New York Asian Film Festival in the Next/Now section of the festival. The two-week festival was held from August 6 to 22, 2021 in New York. The film was screened at Beatrice Theatre, SVA Theatre on August 15, 2021.

The film was invited to 46th Seoul Independent Film Festival in New Choice section, 9th Muju Mountain Film Festival and the 23rd Seoul International Women's Film Festival in Discovery competition section. It was screened at Megabox Sangam World Cup Stadium 4 on August 29, 2021. It was released theatrically on September 1, 2021.

== Reception ==
=== Box office ===
The film was initially released on 101 screens. As of September 27, 2021, it grossed US$78,076 from 10,508 admissions.

=== Critical response ===
Panos Kotzathanasis reviewing for HanCinema wrote that Lee Woo-jeong has directed the film with two main elements irrationality and violence. In his opinion Lee Jae-u's cinematography was average and pace of the film was slow due to editing. Kotzathanasis praised the performance of the main actors and ends the review as, "Snowball has its merits, with parts of the script, the acting, and a number of comments being well communicated. As a whole however, it does not make that much sense, with the sole "excuse" here being that it is Lee Woo-jeong's feature debut."

Lee Seon-pil of Ohmy News, rating the film with 3.5 stars out of 5 wrote, that the film has tried to communicate with the audience by delving into life of three high school girls, who broke the accepted social rules and expectations. He summed up the review as, "[The film] presenting a storm of complex emotions rather than easy sympathy."

Lee Han-lim of The Fact reviewing the film wrote that film began as autobiographical diary of the protagonist. He praised the actors for their performance, writing, "The performances of the actors stand out". Lee calling it, "A memorable independent art film" wrote, "The emotional change that Kang Yi feels toward the end of the film is extremely realistic and shocking."

Lee Joo-hyun of Cine21 reviewing the film appreciated the cinematography with handheld camera to "capture expressions and actions of teenage girls in a simple yet vivid way" and "creating cinematic moments under the influence of the original rather than escaping far from it". Praising the performance of lead actresses, Lee wrote, "All three actors in the movie give their best performances." Liking the setting of film plot in the early 2000s, Lee felt, "The low-saturation screen brings out the feeling of the past." As the film didn't actually show the physical violence, Lee appreciated "the intentional omission and distance from the film", and moving away of camera but capturing the "emotions before and after the event".

Kang Hyo-jin of Spotify News reviewing the film wrote, "..in this work which focuses on emotional changes rather than the story", the portrayal of protagonist was "not easy to interpret and express as she has to show dramatic changes". Kang lauded the performance of lead actresses Bang Min-ah and said, "Bang Min-ah, who has grown into an actress did a great job in the lead role." Kang felt that the ending of film was abrupt and "[it] may lead to different likes and dislikes in terms of 'empathy'." She opined, "It [the film] meticulously captures fragments of emotions and memories that anyone who has spent their school days should feel at least once."

Igor Fishman reviewing the film, opined that the director Lee has focused on generally felt teenage estrangement, as engrossing and basic as James Dean's quivering breakdown in Rebel Without a Cause. Igor praising the performance of Bang Min-ah, the protagonist, said, "Much like the Nicholas Ray classic, the film's effectiveness is tied wholesale to the performance of its lead, with Bang Min-ah's finely tuned expressions of inner turmoil bringing Lee's (director) world to life."

== Awards and nominations ==
Year	Award	Category	Recipient	Result	Ref.
2020	25th Busan International Film Festival	KTH Award	Lee Woo-jung	Won	
2020	25th Busan International Film Festival	CGK&SamyangXEEN Award	Lee Jae-u	Won	
2020	46th Seoul Independent Film Festival	New Choice Award	Snowball	Won	
2021	20th New York Asian Film Festival	Rising Star Asia Award	Bang Min-ah	Won	
2021	42nd Blue Dragon Film Awards	Best New Actress	Bang Min-ah	Nominated	
2021	42nd Blue Dragon Film Awards	Best New Director	Lee Woo-jeong	Nominated	
2021	Busan Film Critics Awards	Best New Actress	Bang Min-ah	Won	
2021	Female Film Writer of the Year Award	Best New Actress	Bang Min-ah	Won	
2021	Female Film Writer of the Year Award	Best Screenplay	Lee Woo-jeong	Won	
2021	2021 Women's Film Festival	Best New Actor	Bang Min-ah	Won	
2021	2021 Women's Film Festival	Best Screenplay	Lee Woo-jeong	Won	
2022	58th Baeksang Arts Awards	Best Supporting Actress	Shim Dal-gi	Nominated	
2022	58th Baeksang Arts Awards	Best New Actress	Bang Min-ah	Nominated	
2022	Chunsa Film Art Awards 2022	Best New Actress	Bang Min-ah	Nominated	
2022	Chunsa Film Art Awards 2022	Best New Director	Lee Woo-jeong	Nominated	
2022	Chunsa Film Art Awards 2022	Best Supporting Actress	Shim Dal-gi	Nominated	
2022	31st Buil Film Awards	Best New Actress	Bang Min-ah	Nominated	
2022	31st Buil Film Awards	Best New Director	Lee Woo-jeong	Nominated	
