= Silent Witness (2013 film) =

Chinese crime thriller film

- Film poster
- Traditional Chinese: 全民目擊
- Simplified Chinese: 全民目击
- Hanyu Pinyin: Quán Mín Mù Jī
- Jyutping: Cyun4 Man4 Meok6 Gik1
- Directed by: Fei Xing
- Written by: Fei Xin
- Produced by: Xiao Kai
- Starring: Sun Honglei; Aaron Kwok; Yu Nan
- Cinematography: Zhao Xiaoding
- Edited by: Kwong Chi Leung
- Music by: Yang Zhuoxin
- Production companies: Beijing New Film Association Co., Ltd.; Shanghai Yinrun Advertising Media Co., Ltd.; Anhui Television; TIK Films; Shenzhen 21st Century Wink Film
- Release date: 13 September 2013
- Running time: 120 minutes
- Country: China
- Language: Mandarin
- Box office: $29,260,000

Silent Witness is a 2013 Chinese crime thriller film written and directed by Fei Xing and starring Sun Honglei, Aaron Kwok and Yu Nan.

== Plot ==
Tycoon Lin Tai's daughter Lin Mengmeng becomes the murder suspect of her father's fiancé Yang Dan. Her defense lawyer Zhou Li and prosecutor Tong Tao gains in-depth understanding through cross-examinations in court.

In the first act, when Yang Dan's personal chauffeur, Sun Wei, was examined by Zhou Li, she lured him to confess that he was actually the one that killed Yang Dan. This allegedly happened after Lin Mengmeng had fled the scene after knocking Yang Dan's down with her red Cayenne SUV. Zhou Li got him to confess through a series of questions that got him to also confess his wife was having an affair with Meng Meng's father, Lin Tai. Everything seems logical at that time and the court and media were satisfied that the chauffeur Sun Wei was the killer.

However, Tong Tao, who had been going after Lin Tai ever since he was called to bar as a legal prosecutor, found something to be amiss. He got his staff to verify that Sun Wei was terminally ill with brain cancer and hence surmised that Lin Tai must have bribed Sun Wei and got Zhou Li to lead everyone to believe Sun Wei was the killer.

In the next court session when Lin Tai was examined, Tong Tao and his staff got an anonymous email that claimed that the sender had video evidence of the murder of Yang Dan. The video was sent over just as Tong Tao and his team came into court for the cross-examination of Lin Tai. But the video self-deleted, hampering it from being presented in court. Tong Tao immediately asked for a recess on the pretext that he had new evidence to reorganise and present to the court. When the court session resumed, Tong Tao took an aggressive stance to cross-examine Lin Tai, and used the infidelity of Yang Dan to spite Lin Tai, insinuating that Lin Tai was made a cuckold by Yang Dan. Surprisingly, this tactic worked and in his agitated state, Lin Tai shouted that he was actually with his daughter in the SUV at the day of the murder. While his daughter had knocked down Yang Dan, it was Lin Tai that got off the car and pushed Yang Dan against the wall, and her head went onto a nail, which killed her. The whole court was in an uproar. Lin Tai was hence detained. His daughter, Mengmeng was also released, having been acquitted of her crime.

Nearing the trial of Lin Tai, Zhou Li revealed to the audience that her team was the one that had gotten hold of the video and had sent it to Tong Tao's team. This video was in turn given to her team via an anonymous source. As she was comparing this video, which was shot at an angle different from the security camera feed that was overlooking the scene, she noticed that the movement of Sun Wei's leg was inconsistent. This led her to believe that the video was shot after the murder had happened. She immediately asked her staff to investigate whether Lin Tai had carried out a massive renovation job within the last few months and also whether he had purchased a lot of second-hand vehicles. Her line of query turned fruitful and led her to a deserted factory in the Su Province. She transgressed into the factory and discover the interior had been modelled after the car park where the murder of Yang Dan had happened. This confirmed her hunch that Lin Tai shot the video in the aftermath of the murder to stage the idea that he was the one that committed the murder instead of his daughter.

Tong Tao also has his suspicion when he revealed the court footage of Lin Tai confessing the murder of Yang Dan. Lin Tai, at that time, made reference that he would not allow himself to be convicted by Tong Tao in front of the "Dragon Back Wall". Unable to fathom what this meant, Tong Tao visited Lin Tai's hometown and spoke to an old villager. The old person explained the significance of the "Dragon Back Wall", telling the story of how, in ancient China, the local dragon king took the place of his dragon son that had committed grave atrocities, and gave himself up to the heavenly warriors that were there to punish the young dragon son. The local mountain where this allegedly happened was hence referred to as the "Dragon Back Mountain". When Tong Tao was returning to town, he received a call from Meng Meng and the audience was led to note that the call was from Meng Meng, who supposedly called to confess her father's plot to save her. The story ends here, leaving the audience a strong sense that Lin Tai had been acquitted, as well as experiencing the power of fatherly love.

== Cast ==
- Sun Honglei as Lin Tai
- Aaron Kwok as Tong Tao
- Yu Nan as Zhou Li
- Deng Jiajia as Lin Mengmeng
- Zhao Lixin as Sun Wei
- Ni Hongjie as Su Hong
- Tong Liya as Li Xiaoni
- Chen Sicheng as Director Chen
- Cica Zhou as Yang Dan
- Tan Songyun as Gao Lingling

== Release ==
Originally scheduled for theatrical release in China on 17 September 2013, the release date was moved forward to 13 September.

== Critical reception ==
Andrew Chan of the Film Critics Circle of Australia writes, "'Silent Witness' is an accomplished and matured court drama thriller, muddled within the essence of parental love, deeper emotions and twists and turns. Director Fei Xing has successfully created a film that touches the audience's heart and expresses universal themes and messages at its core." People have noticed multiple similarities to Capcom's Ace Attorney video game series, including the appearance of Tong Tao resembling Phoenix Wright, similar story beats, and similar "trademark poses", with some even proclaiming the movie to be a "Ace Attorney rip-off". It is, however, unknown if these similarities were intentional or not.

== Remake ==
A South Korean remake is being developed by Jung Ji-woo. It stars Choi Min-shik and Park Shin-hye in the lead roles. It was released in 2017 titled Heart Blackened.
