= Lee Jung-eun (actress) =

South Korean actress (born 1970)

- 이정은
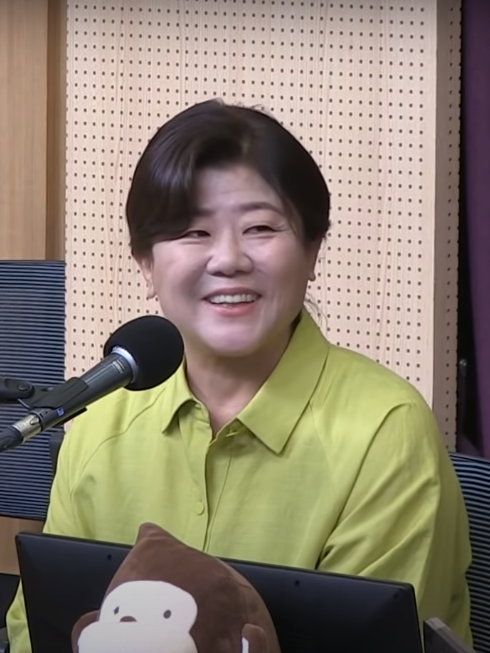
- Lee in 2022
- Born: January 23, 1970 (age 56); Seoul, South Korea
- Education: Hanyang University – Theater and Film
- Occupation: Actress
- Years active: 1991–present
- Agent: Will Entertainment

Korean name
- Hangul: 이정은
- Hanja: 李姃垠
- RR: I Jeongeun
- MR: I Chŏngŭn

Lee Jung-eun (Korean: 이정은; born January 23, 1970) is a South Korean actress. She debuted onstage in 1991 and also played minor roles in films. She went on to appear in acclaimed films like The Attorney (2013), A Violent Prosecutor (2015), and festival favorites such as A Girl at My Door (2014) and The Wailing (2016). Lee landed more significant roles in A Taxi Driver (2017), Miss Baek (2017), and Another Child (2018). Known for her work with Bong Joon-ho, starting with the 2009 film Mother, as the voice of the pig Okja in the film Okja, she is best known internationally for her role as the housekeeper Moon-gwang in the film Parasite, which won four Academy Awards and became the first non-English language film to win the award for Best Picture.

== Early life ==
Lee Jung-eun was born on January 23, 1970, in Seoul and grew up in a neighborhood near Hanyang University. She attended Hanyang Girls' High School, where societal expectations for female students emphasized studying literature and preparing for marriage. However, Lee defied these norms and pursued a career in acting. Her decision was influenced by the student protests she witnessed during high school and the tragic death of activist Lee Han-yeol in 1987. After mourning Lee Han-yeol's death by wearing black ribbons, her friend was expelled, which led to Lee reflecting on her circumstances. This event prompted a rebellion against the older generation and encouraged Lee to reconsider her path. Recalling her love for performing and entertainment, she switched her academic focus to a theater and film major just two months before her college entrance exams, aiming to study directing. She was accepted into the Department of Theater and Film at Hanyang University, class of 1988.

== Career ==
=== Early career ===
After graduating in 1992, Lee began her career as a theater play assistant director, making her debut with the production of A Midsummer Night's Dream in 1991. She remained active on stage throughout the 1990s and 2000s. In 2000, she made her film debut with a minor role in the film A Masterpiece In My Life, followed by another small part in the 2001 film Wanee & Junah. However, these early cinematic experiences left her feeling traumatized by camera fright, and she decided to return to the stage.

At the end of 1997, Lee appeared in Subway Line 1 with Sul Kyung-gu. Subway Line 1 was her first musical. Lee Jung-eun appeared as the generous Gombo Halmae.

In the 2000s, in addition to her theater work, Lee also made a living as an acting teacher. Among her pupils were the actresses Ye Ji-won and Lee Eun-joo. On the recommendation of Professor Lee Hye-kyung, the head of the Department of Theater and Film at Kookmin University, Lee was introduced to Lee Hyo-ri and became an acting teacher for her SBS drama role.

=== Breakthrough as a musical actor, resume film career, debut in television ===
Lee's breakthrough as an actress came in the 2008 musical Laundry, which is considered one of the representative creative musicals in South Korea. In the production, Lee portrayed multiple roles, including a master, a grandmother, and an employee, performing until 2009. Her performance in the musical earned her the 1st Young Drama Award, with a prize of 3 million won. This award was established by the cultural arts support forum "Alpha", which is composed of around 60 domestic CEOs, including Samsung Electronics CEO Kwun Oh-hyun. The award ceremony was held on September 19, 2008, at Shinhan Art Hall in Yeoksam-dong, Gangnam District, Seoul.

She reprised her role in Laundry from 2012 to 2017. Apart from her work in Laundry, Lee collaborated with director Choo Min-joo on reading performances of House with Fig Trees and Scars, as well as the musical Good Morning School.

Lee, who had gained a reputation in the musical field, decided to venture into film projects once again. She made her return to the screen in 2009 with the film If You Were Me 4. Costume designer Choi Se-yeon, who was also the producer of the musical Laundry, recommended her for an audition, which led to her landing a minor role in Bong Joon-ho's 2009 film Mother. This marked her first collaboration with director Bong Joon-ho.

She faced numerous challenges during her years of living in obscurity. Before the age of 40, she had to support herself through various part-time jobs, such as being an academy instructor, working at a supermarket, and selling green juice. It wasn't until she reached the age of 45 that she finally made her debut on television.

In 2013, Lee appeared on television for the first time in The Queen's Classroom and had minor roles in Blue Tower, Royal Villa, and Shining Romance (2013–2014). Lee also appears in the film The Attorney, which attracted 10 million viewers. She appeared as the old house owner of the main character Song Woo-seok (played by Song Kang-ho) and showed off her witty acting. When Song Kang-ho asked her to sell the house because he would pay more than the market price, she said, "Oh my, would you like some 'jussi'?" in a dialect and acted cutely. The following year, she was featured in television dramas Cunning Single Lady, Beauty Parlor Boss, High School King of Savvy, My Lovely Girl, and Only Love.

Her big break came in 2015. After a minor role in the KBS2 school series Who Are You: School 2015, she landed a supporting role in the tvN drama series Oh My Ghost (2015) where she portrayed the Shaman of Seobinggo-dong. Lee gained widespread recognition for her performance in the drama. In 2016, Lee starred in Weightlifting Fairy Kim Bok-joo as Jung Jun-hyung's (Nam Joo-hyuk) mother. In that same year, she won Best Acting at the Seoul Theatre Festival for her role in the play Feast with Hanyang Repertory Theater.

=== 2017–2018: Okja and Mr. Sunshine ===
In 2017, director Bong Joon-ho, who had previously collaborated with Lee on Mother (2009), offered her the role of the voice actor for a genetically modified pig named Okja in the action-adventure film Okja. Lee accepted the role and dedicated herself to researching it by visiting a pig farm. This marked her second collaboration with Bong Joon-ho. Okja featured an international cast, including Tilda Swinton and Paul Dano. The film had its world premiere at the 2017 Cannes Film Festival on May 18, 2017, where it received a four-minute standing ovation. It was later released on Netflix on June 28, 2017, and in July 2022, it was released on Blu-ray and DVD as part of The Criterion Collection.

In the same year, Lee played the role of Geum-bok, the loving and doting mother of Baek Seol-hee (played by Song Ha-yoon), in the KBS2 drama Fight for My Way, written by Lim Sang-choon. Her performance as the mother who prepared delicious side dishes for her daughter's prospective in-laws resonated with many viewers, particularly with the line, "Please just be pretty to our Seolhee."

In 2018, Lee appeared in the historical drama Mr. Sunshine, written by screenwriter Kim Eun-sook. Kim had been impressed by Lee's performance in the film The Battleship Island and recognized her from her role in Oh My Ghost. The two later met at a restaurant, where Kim expressed her admiration for Lee's work. Lee was subsequently cast in the supporting role of Ham-an-daek, the careful and attentive assistant to the character Ae-shin Ae-gi (played by Kim Tae-ri). Originally envisioned as a minor supporting role, Lee's nuanced performance helped evolve the character into a more prominent maternal figure, filling the absence of the female lead's parents. Her portrayal was praised for adding both laughter and warmth to the show.

In that same year, Lee also acted in the tvN drama Familiar Wife, delivering a passionate performance as the mother of the main character, Seo Woo-jin (played by Han Ji-min). Her portrayal of Seo Woo-jin's mother, who was suffering from dementia, was widely acclaimed for its authenticity. For her portrayal in Mr. Sunshine and Familiar Wife, Lee Jung-eun won the Excellence Award in the drama category at the 26th Korea Culture and Entertainment Awards.

=== 2019–2021: Parasite ===
In 2019, Lee starred in several notable projects. In the JTBC drama The Light in Your Eyes, she took on the dual roles of the mother of the main character, Hye-ja (played by Han Ji-min), and the daughter-in-law of Hye-ja (played by Kim Hye-ja). Her performance earned her the Best Supporting Actress Award at the 55th Baeksang Arts Awards. In the OCN series Strangers from Hell, Lee played the role of Eom Bok-soon, the owner of Eden Dormitory. She appears friendly, but she harbors a dark secret.

Lee also reunited with director Bong Joon-ho for the black comedy thriller film Parasite, where she portrayed Gook Moon-gwang, the housekeeper of the Park family. Her performance garnered several awards in the supporting actress category, including the Busan Film Critics Association Awards, Buil Film Awards, Chunsa Film Awards, and Blue Dragon Film Awards. She and her co-stars won Best Ensemble at the Screen Actors Guild Awards for a non-English language film.

Towards the end of 2019, Lee reunited with writer Lim Sang-choon again in the KBS2 drama KBS2 drama When the Camellia Blooms. In this drama, she portrayed the mother of the lead character, Dong-baek, earning praise for her nuanced performance. She won the Excellence Award for Actress in a Mid-length Drama at the 2019 KBS Drama Awards.

In 2020, Lee starred as Kang Cho-yeon in the KBS2 family weekend drama series Once Again, which aired from March 28 to September 13, 2020. She played Young-dal's long-lost younger sister, Song Young-sook, the owner of Sister's Kimbap store. Her performance in the series earned her the KBS Drama Award for Best Supporting Actress in the mid-length drama category.

In the same year, Lee starred in Park Ji-wan's directorial debut film The Day I Died: Unclosed Case as Suncheondaek, alongside Kim Hye-soo. The following year, she received nominations for Best Supporting Actress at the Baeksang Arts Awards, Blue Dragon Film Awards, and Chunsa Film Art Awards for her performance in the film.

In 2021, Lee appeared in Lee Joon-ik's black-and-white film The Book of Fish, portraying the role of Gageo of Heuksan Island, the concubine of scholar Jeong Yak-jeon (1758–1816), played by Sul Kyung-gu. The film is based on a true story, featuring historical materials researched by director Lee Joon-ik. Lee's performance earned her a nomination for Best Supporting Actress at the 30th Buil Film Awards. That same year, Lee collaborated with director Kim Seok-yoon for the drama Law School, marking her third project with him, where she portrayed Kim Eun-sook, a former judge and civil law professor.

=== 2022–present: First titular role and recent projects ===
In 2022, she starred in Netflix's original series Juvenile Justice as Judge Na Geun-hee. Directed by Hong Jong-chan, the series focuses on characters at a district juvenile court handling cases involving young offenders. Lee's character clashes with elite judge Shim Eun-seok (Kim Hye-soo) due to their differing approaches to the cases. This collaboration marks the second time Lee and Kim have worked together. Lee's performance in Juvenile Justice earned her a nomination for Excellence Award, Actress in an OTT Drama at the 2022 APAN Star Awards, as well as Best Supporting Actress at the 2022 Asian Academy Creative Awards and 2022 Blue Dragon Series Awards.

In that same year, Lee took on her first titular role in 30 years in Shin Su-won's film Hommage. She portrayed a middle-aged film director experiencing a slump who time travels while restoring the film The Female Judge, created by Hong Eun-won, the second Korean female director in the 1960s. The film premiered at the 23rd Jeonju International Film Festival on April 28, 2022. On December 15, 2022, she won Best Actress at The 23rd Women's Film Awards held at Cinecube Gwanghwamun in Seoul.

After winning the Best Jury Prize at the 20th Florence Korea Film Festival, Hommage was officially invited to the Viewpoints section of the 21st Tribeca Film Festival. Lee has also received international recognition, including The Best Actor Award at the 7th London East Asia Film Festival. The jury selected Lee for this award based on her portrayal of desire, frustration, and the courage displayed by a middle-aged woman whose dreams were delicately and realistically depicted in Hommage. Lee also won the Best Performance Award at the 15th Asia Pacific Screen Awards.

In the end of 2022, Lee appeared in Missing: The Other Side Season 2 as Kang Eun-sil, a captain with 30 years of experience who now resides in a mysterious village inhabited by spirits. Despite her past, she is known for her roaring laughter and enigmatic background. The second season is moved from OCN to tvN from December 19, 2022 to January 31, 2023, every Monday and Tuesday at 20:50 (KST).

In 2023, Lee joined the cast of Netflix's original series Daily Dose of Sunshine as Song Hyo-shin, the chief nurse of the Psychiatric Department. Lee also appeared in the TVING original A Bloody Lucky Day alongside Lee Sung-min and Yoo Yeon-seok. The series is based on a webtoon of the same name by Aporia, originally published on Naver. A Bloody Lucky Day aired on tvN starting November 20, 2023, with episodes airing every Monday and Tuesday.

In 2024, Lee starred in JTBC's new romantic comedy Miss Night and Day alongside Jung Eun-ji. The show revolves around Lee Mi-jin, a woman who has been preparing for a civil service exam for eight years. One day, a strange incident causes her to age into a 50-year-old during the daytime. Despite this, she manages to work as a senior intern with her older appearance and continues her studies at night. Throughout her journey, she encounters prosecutor Gye Ji-woong, portrayed by Choi Jin-hyuk.

== Filmography ==
=== Film ===
List of films
Year	Title		Role	Notes	Ref.
Year	English	Korean	Role	Notes	Ref.
2000	A Masterpiece In My Life	불후의 명작	Jin-won's wife		
2001	Wanee & Junah	와니와 준하	Producer		
2009	If You Were Me 4	시선 1318	Ahjumma		
2009	Mother	마더	Ah-jeong's relative		
2013	Born to Sing	전국노래자랑	Dong-soo's aunt		
2013	The Attorney	헬머니	Apartment owner		
2013	Bug	벌레	Mom		
2014	A Girl at My Door	도희야	Neighborhood woman		
2014	Cart	카트	Cashier		
2014	A Dynamite Family		Women's association member		
2015	Detective K: Secret of the Lost Island	조선명탐정: 사라진 놉의 딸	Middle-aged woman		
2015	Granny's Got Talent		Grandmother shaman's daughter-in-law		
2015	The Exclusive: Beat the Devil's Tattoo	특종: 량첸살인기	Inn Keeper		
2015	Summer Snow		Woman from Hwasoon		
2016	Mood of the Day	그날의 분위기	Employee of Rainbow restaurant		
2016	A Violent Prosecutor	검사외전	Middle-aged female campaigner		
2016	Like for Likes	좋아해줘	Real estate office middle-aged woman		
2016	4th Place		Owner of covered wagon		
2016	Time Renegades	시간이탈자	High school teacher		
2016	The Wailing	곡성	Deok-gi's wife		
2016	With or Without You		BBQ restaurant part-timer		
2016	A Break Alone		Past yoga institute		
2017	New Trial	재심	Oh Mi-ri		
2017	The Sheriff in Town	보안관	Yong-hwan's wife		
2017	Okja	옥자	Okja's voice / Wheelchair woman	Voice	
2017	The Battleship Island	군함도	Women's society chairman		
2017	A Taxi Driver	택시운전사	Hwang Tae-sool's wife		
2017	Yakiniku Dragon		Go Young-soon		
2018	Adulthood		Judge		
2018	Miss Baek	미쓰백	Massage shop owner		
2018	Hello			Short film	
2019	Mal-Mo-E: The Secret Mission	말모이	Jeju teacher	Cameo	
2019	Another Child	미성년	Breakwater middle-aged woman		
2019	Parasite	기생충	Gook Moon-gwang		
2019	Let Us Meet Now		Jung-eun		
2020	Mr. Zoo: The Missing VIP	미스터 주: 사라진 VIP	Gorilla	Voice	
2020	The Day I Died: Unclosed Case	내가 죽던 날	Woman from Suncheon		
2021	The Book of Fish	자산어보	Woman from Gageo		
2021	Bechdel Day 2021	벡델데이 2021	Photographer		
2022	House of Blessing		Insurance		
2022	Take Care of Mom	말임씨를 부탁해	Senior employee of the insurance company	Special appearance	
2022	Good Morning	안녕하세요	Nurse friend at the fishing grounds	Special appearance	
2022	Hommage	오마주	Kim Ji-wan	Independent film	
2022	Woman in the White Car		Hyeon-joo	It premiered at the 26th BIFAN	
2023	Dr. Cheon and Lost Talisman	천박사 퇴마 연구소: 설경의 비밀	Madame	Special appearance	
2025	My Daughter Is a Zombie	좀비딸	Kim Bam-sun		
2025	The Journey to Gyeongju	경주기행	Ok-sil		

=== Television series ===
Key
†	Denotes television productions that have not yet been released

List of television series
Year	Title		Role	Note	Ref.
Year	English	Korean	Role	Note	Ref.
2013	The Queen's Classroom	여왕의 교실	Seon-yeong's mother		
2013	Blue Tower	푸른거탑	Ostrich farm owner/grandmother		
2013	Blue Tower ZERO	푸른거탑 제로	Jong-hoon's mother		
2013	Royal Villa	시트콩 로얄빌라	Lee Jung-eun		
2013–2014	Shining Romance	빛나는 로맨스			
2014	Cunning Single Lady	앙큼한 돌싱녀	Beauty parlor boss	Cameo	
2014	High School King of Savvy	고교처세왕	Soo-yeong's mother		
2014	My Lovely Girl	내겐 너무 사랑스러운 그녀	Mr. Jung's wife	Cameo (episode 3)	
2014	Only Love	사랑만 할래	Park Soon-ja		
2015	Who Are You: School 2015	후아유: 학교 2015	Yeong-eun's mother	Cameo (episode 2–3)	
2015	Oh My Ghost	오 나의 귀신님	Shaman in Seobinggo-dong		
2015	My Fantastic Funeral	나의 판타스틱한 장례식	Mi-soo's aunt		
2015	Songgot: The Piercer	송곳	Kim Jeong-mi		
2015–2016	Remember	리멤버 – 아들의 전쟁	Yeon Bo-mi		
2016	Pied Piper	피리부는 사나이	Oh Ha-na		
2016	Bring It On, Ghost	싸우자 귀신아	Apartment chairwoman		
2016	Don't Dare to Dream	질투의 화신	Doctor	Cameo	
2016	The Gentlemen of Wolgyesu Tailor Shop	월계수 양복점 신사들	Geum Chon-daek		
2016	Drama Special: "Noodle House Girl"	KBS 드라마 스페셜 - 국시집 여자	Ok-sim	One-act drama	
2016–2017	Weightlifting Fairy Kim Bok-joo	역도요정 김복주	Joon-hyeong's mother		
2017	Tomorrow, with You	내일 그대와	Cha Boo-sim		
2017	Ice Bing-gu	빙구	Lee Jeong-eun		
2017	Bad Thief, Good Thief	도둑놈, 도둑님	Kwon Jeong-hee		
2017	Fight for My Way	쌈 마이웨이	Geum-bok		
2017	Someone Who Might Know	알 수도 있는 사람	Kim Jin-yeong	Cameo	
2017	While You Were Sleeping	당신이 잠든 사이에	Jae-chan's mother		
2017	Drama Special: "Buzz Cut's Date"	KBS 드라마 스페셜 - 까까머리의 연애	Yeong-hee	One-act drama	
2017	Drama Stage: "Assistant Manager Park's Private Life"	드라마 스테이지 - 박대리의 은밀한 사생활		One-act drama	
2018	Nice Witch	착한마녀전	Chief	Cameo	
2018	Ms. Hammurabi	미스 함무라비	Couple manager	Cameo	
2018	Mr. Sunshine	미스터 션샤인	Go Ae-shin's loyal maid		
2018	Familiar Wife	아는 와이프	Woo-jin's mother		
2018	My Strange Hero	복수가 돌아왔다	Mother of a Your Request client	Cameo (episode 4)	
2019	The Light in Your Eyes	눈이 부시게	Moon Jung-eun		
2019	Welcome to Waikiki 2	으라차차 와이키키 2	Kimbap Heavenly owner	Cameo (episode 3)	
2019	When the Devil Calls Your Name	악마가 너의 이름을 부를 때		Cameo	
2019	Hell Is Other People	타인은 지옥이다	Eom Bok-soon		
2019	When the Camellia Blooms	동백꽃 필 무렵	Jo Jung-sook		
2020	My Holo Love	나 홀로 그대	So-yeon's mother	Cameo	
2020	Hi Bye, Mama!	하이바이, 마마!	Shaman in Seobinggo-dong	Cameo (episode 4 & 10)	
2020	A Piece of Your Mind	반의 반	Kim Min-jung		
2020	Once Again	한 번 다녀왔습니다	Kang Cho-yeon		
2021	Law School	로스쿨	Kim Eun-sook		
2021	Monthly Magazine Home	월간 집	Lee Soo-jung	Cameo	
2021	Hometown Cha-Cha-Cha	갯마을 차차차	Kim Yeon-ok	Cameo	
2022	Juvenile Justice	소년 심판	Na Geun-hee		
2022	Soundtrack #1	사운드트랙 #1	Eun Su-mo		
2022	Our Blues	우리들의 블루스	Jeong Eun-hee		
2022	Yonder	욘더	Siren		
2022	Little America	—N/a	Sook-ja	Season 2 – (Ep. 1: Mr. Song)	
2022–2023	Missing: The Other Side	미씽: 그들이 있었다	Kang Eun-sil	Season 2	
2023	A Bloody Lucky Day	운수 오진 날	Hwang Soon-gyu		
2023	Daily Dose of Sunshine	정신병동에도 아침이 와요	Song Hyo-shin		
2024	Miss Night and Day	낮과 밤이 다른 그녀	Lim-soon / older Lee Mi-jin	Main lead	
2024	The Frog	아무도 없는 숲속에서	Yoon Bo-min		
2024	The Trunk		Kwon Do-dam	Supporting Role	
2024	Light Shop	조명가게	Jung Yu-hee		
2025	Heavenly Ever After	천국보다 아름다운	Lee Young-ae		
2026	Doctor X: Mafia in White	닥터X: 하얀 마피아의 시대	Jang Hui-suk		
TBA	Knock-Off †	넉오프	Park Ae-ja		

== Stage ==
=== Musical ===
List of musical plays
Year	Title		Role	Theater	Date	Ref.
Year	English	Original	Role	Theater	Date	Ref.
1997–2001	Subway Line 1	지하철 1호선	Grandma Gom-bo	Hakjeon Blue Theater Small Theater	—N/a	
2008	Laundry	빨래	Laundry Owner (grandma)	Oriental Art Theater Hall 1 (Former Art Center K Square Theater)	03.15–08.17	
2009	Laundry	빨래	Laundry Owner (grandma)	Doosan Art Center Yeongang Hall	4.28–6.14	
2009	Laundry	빨래	Laundry Owner (grandma)	MBC Lotte Art Hall	09.18–09.20	
2009	Laundry	빨래	Laundry Owner (grandma)	The Eggs and Nuclear Small Theater	08.29–12.31	
2011	Good morning school ver.7	굿모닝 학교 ver.7	Bong Gyeong-ja	Hakjeon Blue Small Theater	11.11–12.25	
2012	Laundry	빨래	Laundry Owner (grandma)	Maru Hall, Yongin Culture and Arts Center	02.11–02.12	
2012	Laundry	빨래	Laundry Owner (grandma)	Hakjeon Blue Theater Small Theater	04.04–10.07	
2012–2013	Assassin	어쌔신	Sarah Jane Moore	Doosan Art Center Yeongang Hall	11.20–02.03	
2013	Laundry	빨래	Laundry Owner (grandma)	Art One Theater 2	03.14–10.05	
2015	Laundry - 10th Anniversary	빨래 - 10주년 기념	Laundry Owner (grandma)	Oriental Art Theater Hall 1 (Former Art Center K Square Theater)	June 10–14	
2016–2017	Laundry	빨래	Laundry Owner (grandma)	Oriental Art Theater Hall 1 (Former Art Center K Square Theater)	2016.03.10–2017.02.26	
2017	An Eden hair salon in Eden	에덴미용실	Mom	Oriental Art Theater Hall 2 (Former Art Center K Semo Theater)	11.07–12.31	

=== Theater ===
List of theater plays
Year	Title		Role	Theater	Date	Ref.
Year	English	Korean	Role	Theater	Date	Ref.
1991	A Midsummer Night's Dream	한여름 밤의 꿈				
1995–1996	Chunpoong's Wife	춘풍의 처		Dongsung Studio Theater	3.3–4.14	
1995–1996	Simbasame	심바새메				
1998–1999	Magic Time	매직타임		Batanggol Small Theater	9.17–11.1	
1999	Liar	라이어		Batanggol Small Theater	5.1–6.27	
1999	Liar	라이어		Batanggol Small Theater	7.2–10.17	
2010	Elimosineary	엘리모시너리	Dorothy	Arko Arts Theater Small Theater	01.20–01.31	
2010	Uncle Soonwoo	순우 삼촌	Jeong-mun	Sejong Center for the Performing Arts M Theater	04.22–05.01	
2010	Elimosineary	엘리모시너리	Dorothy	Miarigogae Arts Theater	12.03–12.20	
2011	The People of Jangseokjo	장석조네 사람들	Heung Nam-daek	Daehangno Theater of Art	03.17–03.27	
2011	2011 World National Theater Festival - The People of Jangseokjo	2011 세계국립극장페스티벌 - 장석조네 사람들	Heung Nam-daek	National Theater of Korea Daloreum Theater	09.14–09.17	
2011	Mahoroba Corporation	마호로바	Midori	Yeonwoo Small Theater (Daehak-ro)	09.01–09.25	
2012	If I am with you	너와 함께라면	mother	KT&G Sangsang Madang Daechi Art Hall	04.20–06.10	
2012–2013	If I am with you	너와 함께라면	mother	Daehangno Sound Art Hall 1	07.06–03.03	
2015	Sad Fate	슬픈 인연	Kim Soon-im	Myeong-dong Art Theater	03.20–04.05	
2016	A Feast	잔치	Byeonggilne	Namsan Arts Center Drama Center	04.29–05.07	

== Accolades ==
=== Awards and nominations ===
Award	Year	Category	Nominee / Work	Result	Ref.
APAN Star Awards	2021	Best Supporting Actress	Once Again	Nominated	
APAN Star Awards	2022	Excellence Award, Actress in an OTT Drama	Juvenile Justice	Nominated	
Asia Artist Awards	2019	Focus Award	Lee Jung-eun	Won	
Asia Artist Awards	2019	Choice Award	Lee Jung-eun	Won	
Asia Artist Awards	2019	AAA Scene Stealer	Lee Jung-eun	Won	
Asian Academy Creative Awards	2022	Best Actress in a Supporting role	Juvenile Justice	Nominated	
Asian Film Awards	2020	Best Supporting Actress	Parasite	Nominated	
Asian Film Critics Association Awards	2020	Best Supporting Actress	Parasite	Nominated	
Asia Pacific Screen Awards	2022	Best Performance	Hommage	Won	
Baeksang Arts Awards	2019	Best Supporting Actress – Television	The Light in Your Eyes	Won	
Baeksang Arts Awards	2020	Best Supporting Actress – Film	Parasite	Nominated	
Baeksang Arts Awards	2021	Best Supporting Actress – Film	The Day I Died: Unclosed Case	Nominated	
Baeksang Arts Awards	2024	Best Supporting Actress – Television	A Bloody Lucky Day	Nominated	
Blue Dragon Film Awards	2019	Best Supporting Actress	Parasite	Won	
Blue Dragon Film Awards	2021	Best Supporting Actress	The Day I Died: Unclosed Case	Nominated	
Blue Dragon Film Awards	2025	Best Supporting Actress	My Daughter is a Zombie	Nominated	
Blue Dragon Film Awards	2026	Best Actress	The Journey to Gyeongju	Pending	
Blue Dragon Series Awards	2022	Best Supporting Actress	Juvenile Justice	Nominated	
Buil Film Awards	2019	Best Supporting Actress	Parasite	Won	
Buil Film Awards	2021	Best Supporting Actress	The Book of Fish	Nominated	
Buil Film Awards	2022	Best Actress	Hommage	Nominated	
Busan Film Critics Awards	2019	Best Actress	Parasite	Won	
Chunsa Film Art Awards	2019	Best Supporting Actress	Parasite	Won	
Chunsa Film Art Awards	2021	Best Supporting Actress	The Day I Died: Unclosed Case	Nominated	
Chunsa Film Art Awards	2022	Best Actress	Hommage	Nominated	
Cine21 Film Awards	2019	Best Actress	Parasite	Won	
Critics' Choice Awards	2020	Best Acting Ensemble	Parasite	Nominated	
Director's Cut Awards	2019	Best Actress	Parasite	Nominated	
Grand Bell Awards	2020	Best Supporting Actress	Parasite	Won	
Grand Bell Awards	2022	Best Actress	Hommage	Nominated	
IndieWire Critics Poll	2019	Best Supporting Actress	Parasite	22nd place	
KBS Drama Awards	2019	Excellence Award, Actress in a Mid-length Drama	When the Camellia Blooms	Won	
KBS Drama Awards	2020	Excellence Award, Actress in a Serial Drama	Once Again	Won	
KBS Drama Awards	2020	Best Couple Award with Chun Ho-jin	Once Again	Won	
Korean Culture and Entertainment Awards	2018	Excellence Award, Actress in a Drama	Mr. Sunshine, Familiar Wife	Won	
Korea First Brand Awards	2019	Scene Stealer Award, Actress	Lee Jung-eun	Won	
London Asian Film Festival	2022	Best Actress	Hommage	Won	
MBC Drama Awards	2017	Golden Acting Award, Actress in a Weekend Drama	Bad Thief, Good Thief	Nominated	
Screen Actors Guild Awards	2020	Outstanding Performance by an Ensemble in a Motion Picture	Parasite	Won	
Seoul Theater Festival	2016	Acting Award	Lee Jung-eun	Won	
Scene Stealer Festival	2021	Bonsang "Main Prize"	Once Again	Won	
Women in Film Korea Festival	2022	Best Actress	Hommage	Won	
Young Drama Awards	2008	Best Actress	Laundry	Won	

=== State honors ===
Name of country, year given, and name of honor
Country	Year	Honor	Ref.
South Korea (Note: Honors are given at the Korean Popular Culture and Arts Awards, arranged by the Korea Creative Content Agency and hosted by the Ministry of Culture, Sports and Tourism. They are awarded to those who have contributed to the arts and South Korea's pop culture.)	2021	Prime Minister's Commendation	
South Korea	2025	Presidential Commendation	

=== Listicles ===
Name of publisher, year listed, name of listicle, and placement
Publisher	Year	Listicle	Placement	Ref.
Korean Film Council	2021	Korean Actors 200 (Note: Introduces 200 actors that best represent the present and future of Korean cinema to the people in the film industry all over the world.)	Included	
