= Fei Xing =

Chinese film director and screen editor

Li Wenbing (born December 6, 1970) is a Chinese film director and editor best known under his pseudonym Fei Xing. Having origins in a musically gifted family, Li studied music for the majority of his childhood and adolescence. After university, Li abandoned his area of focus to write television dramas. Some of his early works as a screenwriter include (Baofeng Fating) and (The Whole Truth), courtroom drama and detective thriller series respectively. Later Li used his experience writing to attempt to direct several of his own television shows, first producing (Meimeng Rensheng), a series of romantic comedies employing dark humor to both entertain and enlighten audiences of the hardships of those in the entertainment business. A departure from his usual genre of focus, Li soon returned to crime fiction in (Feichang Baodao) his most recent non-film production.

Li is considered in the avant-garde of modern Chinese cinema; in 2010 he self-composed and directed China's first crime oriented feature film, (The Man Behind The Courtyard House). In 2012 Li introduced his second movie, (Silent Witness) which won five awards at the China International Film Festival in London the following year. This work combined the acting of mainland actor and actress Sun Hong Lei and Yu Nan as well as Hong Kong actor and singer Aaron Kwok that helped it gain large investments.

== Early life ==
Li was born in Suzhou, Anhui Province. His father a folk music composer, and his mother sang in both Chinese and Western operas at the time. Under these influences, he studied the liuqin lute from a young age, and enrolled in Anhui Vocational College of Art after completing senior high school.

As a child, Li had always harbored a secret love for films, especially Hollywood blockbusters. He became aware of his calling to the film business when, as a senior in high school, he secretly wrote the script for a new movie. As a practical joke, he told his classmates "I have just seen an American movie, the story goes like this...", and described his own plot in great length and detail. Unexpectedly, the story was so provoking to the group of teenagers, that the next day, two girls from his class skipped school to search for the film in the movie theater. When questioned about the absence of the film, Li confessed to his prank, but his classmates still did not believe that he had written it saying "How could you have arranged such a wonderful story?!" This experience would come to impact Li's in his later decision to enter into the movie industry.

Upon graduating from college, Li moved south to Shenzhen in Canton province, where he became a professional instrumentalist. Shortly after the outset of his musical career, Li was recognized for his shrewdness in screenwriting and started composing television shows, which he later came to direct. After realizing that his dream was to be a filmmaker, Li abruptly left Shenzhen to move back to his home of Anhui and began his livelihood as a director.

== Filmography ==
=== Film Director ===
- The Man Behind the Courtyard House (2011)
- Silent Witness (2013)

=== Television Series Writer ===
- Baofeng Fating (2004)
- The Whole Truth (2004)

=== Television Series Director ===
- Meimeng Rensheng (2007)
- Feichang Baodao (2007)

== Awards ==
Chinese Image Film Festival Young Director's Award—2011

Chinese Image Film Festival Best Film Award—2011

Chinese International Film Festival London Best Director's Award—2013

Chinese International Film Festival London Best Screenwriter's Award—2013
