= Lee Yeon =

South Korean actress (born 1995)

- 이연
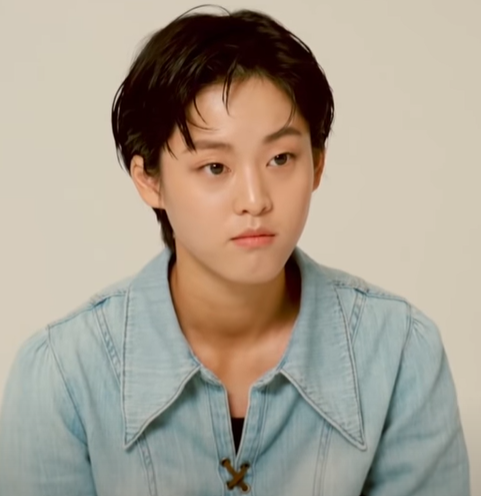
- Lee for Marie Claire Korea in 2022
- Born: 27 February 1995 (age 31); South Korea
- Occupation: Actress
- Years active: 2018–present
- Agent: Echo Global Group

Korean name
- Hangul: 이연
- RR: I Yeon
- MR: I Yŏn

Lee Yeon (Korean: 이연; born 27 February 1995) is a South Korean actress. She is best known for her portrayal of male character Baek Seong-woo in 2022 Netflix-produced South Korean drama Juvenile Justice.

== Career ==
Lee Yeon first made her debut as an actress in 2018 with the South Korean film Anonymous. She has appeared in several films and television series, including a cameo as the younger sister of the male lead Jung Hae-in's character in the South Korean Netflix drama D.P. (2021).

Lee's breakout role comes from 2022 Netflix drama Juvenile Justice, in which Lee's character is a 13-year-old male teenager Baek Seong-woo, who was charged with murdering a young schoolboy in the drama's first two episodes. Despite being a female and her Korean age of 28 at the time she portrayed Seong-woo, Lee's acting and transformation as a cold-blooded murderer was positively reviewed and applauded by audiences and critics. Lee's performance in Juvenile Justice allowed her to gain a "Best New Actress" award nomination by the 58th Baeksang Arts Awards, but the award was eventually given to Kim Hye-jun.

In 2025, Lee made a special appearance in the film Good News

In 2026, Lee appeared in the MBC drama Perfect Crown and in the film Tango at Dawn alongside Kwon So-hyun.

== Filmography ==
=== Films ===
Year	Title	Role	Notes	Ref.
2018	Anonymous	Chae-jin		
2019	Cosmos	Hye-soo	Short film	
2020	Take Me Home	Kim Ye-won		
2021	A Lonely Island in the Distant Sea	Seong Ji-na	It premiered DGK MEGABOX Award at 2021 BIFF; It premiered official 2023	
2023	Kill Boksoon	Kim Yeong-ji	Netflix film	
2025	Good News	Haneda Airport couple passenger	Cameo	
2025	The Journey to Gyeongju	Dong-ju		
2026	Tango at Dawn	Ji-won		

=== Television series ===
Year	Title	Role	Notes	Ref.
2019	Drama Stage: "Waves of Change"	Ye-eun	Season 2; episode 10	
2019	Drama Special: "Goodbye B1"	Lee Yeon-hee	Season 10; Episode 6	
2020	Find Me in Your Memory	Student		
2020	SF8		Episode 2 - "Blink"; Episode 4 - "Manxin"	
2020	Drama Special: "My Teacher"	Lee Eun-seo	Season 11, Episode 3	
2023	Crash Course in Romance	young Nam Haeng-sun		
2023	Delightfully Deceitful	Jung Da-jeong		
2023	Drama Special: "Shoot For Love"	Go Do-hyun	one act-drama	
2026	Perfect Crown	Do Hye-jeong		

=== Web series ===
Year	Title	Role	Notes	Ref.
2021–2023	D.P.	Ahn Soo-jin	Season 1–2	
2022	Juvenile Justice	Baek Seong-woo		
2022	Weak Hero Class 1	Young-yi	Season 1	
2023	Duty After School	No Ae-seol	Part 1–2	

== Accolades ==
=== Awards and nominations ===
Name of the award ceremony, year presented, category, nominee of the award, and the result of the nomination
Award ceremony	Year	Category	Nominee / Work	Result	Ref.
Baeksang Arts Awards	2022	Best New Actress – Television	Juvenile Justice	Nominated	
Baeksang Arts Awards	2023	Best Supporting Actress – Film	Kill Boksoon	Nominated	
Blue Dragon Film Awards	2026	Best New Actress	The Journey to Gyeongju	Pending	
Buil Film Awards	2023	Best Supporting Actress	Kill Boksoon	Nominated	
Global Film & Television Huading Awards	2023	Best Global Teleplay Supporting Actress	Juvenile Justice	Nominated	
Korea Drama Awards	2023	Best New Actress	Delightfully Deceitful	Won	

=== Listicles ===
Name of publisher, year listed, name of listicle, and placement
Publisher	Year	Listicle	Placement	Ref.
Joy News 24	2023	Rising Star Film Actor of the Year	4th	
