= Ra Mi-ran =

South Korean actress (born 1975)

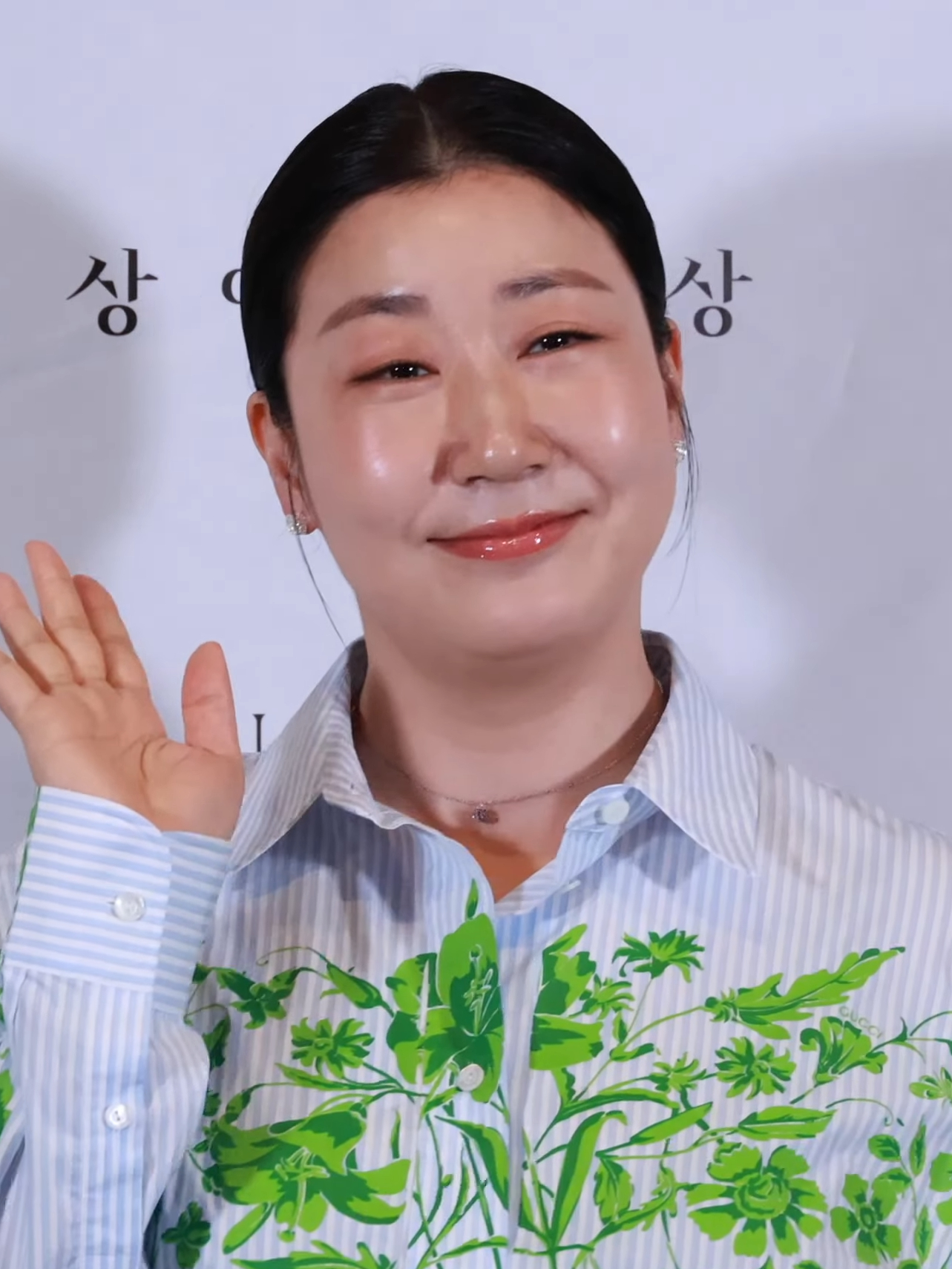
- Ra in April 2024
- Born: March 6, 1975 (age 51); South Korea
- Education: Seoul Institute of the Arts
- Occupations: Actress; television personality
- Years active: 2005–present
- Agent(s): T&N Entertainment
- Spouse: Kim Jin-gu (m. 2002)
- Children: Kim Geun-woo

Korean name
- Hangul: 라미란
- RR: Ra Miran
- MR: Ra Miran

Ra Mi-ran (Korean: 라미란; born March 6, 1975) is a South Korean actress and television personality. She works regularly as an actress, often in a supporting role, notably in Lee Joon-ik's Hope (2013), for which her portrayal of a young boy's mother won Best Supporting Actress at the 34th Blue Dragon Film Awards; she also won praise for her work in The Himalayas (2015), for which she won Best Supporting Actress at the 52nd Baeksang Arts Awards. She won acclaim for her scene stealing in the hit cable drama Reply 1988 (2015).

After starting in theater for a decade, she made her film debut in Park Chan-wook's Lady Vengeance in 2005. She successfully transitioned to leading roles in the television series Avengers Social Club (2017) and The Good Bad Mother (2023), while keeping her foot in the film world with Miss & Mrs. Cops (2019), Honest Candidate (2020), and Citizen of a Kind (2024).

== Early life and education ==
Ra Mi-ran was born in Gohan-ri, Sabuk-eup, Jeongseon County, Gangwon Province, and lived in a mining town throughout her childhood until middle school. Her father's passing when she was two years old led her mother to raise five children while operating a boarding house in the same town. From elementary school, she contributed significantly at home; when her mother had to take her older sister to the hospital, Ra, being the youngest, would prepare meals and assist with the boarding house chores. This experience made her the good cook she is today.

In her childhood, Ra had a shy personality and was not one to take the lead in school. However, She enjoyed telling jokes, drawing, singing, and participating in sports, believing she should focus on the arts rather than academics. A pivotal childhood memory from the age of five involved watching a street performer across a suspension bridge. The enthusiastic applause and cheers from the public left a lasting impression, which Ra later identified as the catalyst for her aspiration to become an actress. Eventually, she realized that theater was a way to combine all her interests. In 1993, she enrolled in the Department of Theater at Seoul Institute of the Arts.

== Career ==
=== Beginning ===
After graduating from the Seoul Institute of the Arts, Ra Mi-ran began her acting career in plays and musicals. She believed that the stage offered more diverse opportunities than broadcasting, which she felt favored actresses who met conventional beauty standards. Recognizing that she did not fit these standards, Ra dedicated herself into honing her acting skills and gaining experience.

At the age of 28, Ra got married and had a child, taking a two-year break from her career. After this hiatus, she was invited to audition for Park Chan-wook's film Lady Vengeance, as her earlier profile had captured the director's interest. Despite her concerns about her post-pregnancy weight and lack of screen experience, she passed the audition. She portrayed Oh Soo-hee, a character tormented by a "prison witch" whom Geum-ja (Lee Young-ae) had saved. The film's release in 2005 marked her screen debut.

=== Breakthrough ===
Following her debut, Ra appeared in over 40 films, mostly in minor roles, including The Host, Miss Crush, and Hello Ghost. However, she didn't gain widespread acclaim or public recognition until her role in Jeon Kyu-hwan's independent film Dancing Queen (2012). In this film, she portrayed Myeong-ae, a North Korean defector who is Uhm Jung-hwa's character's best friend and hairdresser. Ra's performance was praised, with Variety calling it "a standout." Ra received further recognition for her acting when she won the Directors Guild of Korea Award - Best Actress at the 15th Busan International Film Festival. Since then, she has been able to secure roles without auditioning.

In 2013, Ra's career began to thrive. She appeared as a supporting actress in The Spy: Undercover Operation, where Pierce Conran noted her performance was "at ease with the throwaway banter and physical humor." She also made a cameo appearance in the film Deed. Her television work includes roles in Jang Ok-jung, Living by Love, Rude Miss Young-ae, The Suspicious Housekeeper, and The Eldest. Most notably, she took on a significant role in Lee Joon-ik's film Hope (2013). This film, which tells the story of So-won, a child who is a victim of sexual assault, was seen by 3 million viewers. For her portrayal of Young-seok's mother, So-won's neighbor, Ra brought warmth, laughter, and emotion to the character, earning her the Best Supporting Actress award at the 34th Blue Dragon Film Awards.

In 2014, Ra participated in the "Female Soldier Special" of MBC's Real Men. The show was a domestic success, achieving over a 20% viewership rating. Despite only being in the military for "3 nights and 4 days," Ra described the experience as feeling like "4 years," enduring bruises, fatigue, and sleep deprivation. Her hard work paid off as she gained wider public recognition, and received praise for her "military physique." That same year, Ra portrayed the role of the main character Deok-su's (Hwang Jung-min) aunt in the film Ode to My Father, which surpassed 10 million viewers. She earned three nominations for best supporting actress for the role at the Blue Dragon Film Awards, Grand Bell Awards, and Max Movie Awards.

In 2015, she reunited with Hwang Jung-min in the feature film The Himalayas. She played Jo Myeong-ae, a member of the expedition team who accompanies Captain Um Hong-gil (Hwang Jung-min) to recover the body of the late Park Moo-taek (Jung Woo). For this role, she won Best Supporting Actress at the 52nd Baeksang Arts Awards. and in Buil Film Awards.

In 2015, Ra Mi-ran starred in tvN Reply 1988, the third installment of the retro Reply series by writer Lee Woo-jung and director Shin Won-ho. She played one of a trio of "ajummas" from Ssangmun-dong, alongside Lee Il-hwa and Kim Sun-young. Known by the nickname "Cheetah" due to her fondness for animal print, she portrayed the wife of Kim Sung-kyun's character and the mother of two sons, Kim Jung-bong (Ahn Jae-hong) and Kim Jung-hwan (Ryu Jun-yeol). Ra's performance in the drama was widely praised, earning her a reputation as a scene-stealer and leading to the nickname "Master of Acting Everyday Life" for her natural acting. The role further solidified her recognition as a prolific and talented supporting actress.

Following Reply 1988, Ra appeared in the KBS 2TV weekend drama The Gentlemen of Wolgyesu Tailor Shop. In this series, she played Bok Seon-nyeo, the wife of Cha In-pyo's character, Bae Sam-do. The two were a popular comedic couple, with Bae Sam-do, a former tailor who ran a fried chicken restaurant, often described as chivalrous yet completely bewildered by his wife. The drama was a success, with ratings peaking at 34.6%.

In 2016, Ra portray Bok-mi, a devoted lady-in-waiting of Princess Deokhye in Hur Jin-ho's period film The Last Princess. That same year, through the reality show Sister's Slam Dunk, she along with cast members Min Hyo Rin, Kim Sook, Hong Jin Kyung, Jessi, and Tiffany debuted as a girl group with the oldest average age in K-pop history, under the name Unnies.

=== Transitioning to main roles ===
In 2017, Ra Mi-ran starred in the television series Avengers Social Club alongside Lee Yo-won, Myung Se-bin, and Lee Jun-young. Based on the webtoon of the same name, the drama aired on tvN every Wednesday and Thursday starting on October 11, 2017. Ra played Hong Do-hee, a fishmonger and single mother who joins a revenge club with three other people after her son is involved in a school violence incident. For her performance, Ra was nominated for Best Supporting Actress at the 54th Baeksang Arts Awards.

Ra later transformed into a politician running for Seoul mayor in the Park In-je's film The Mayor, where she portrayed politician Yang Jin-ju, who faced off against Choi Min-shik's character Byun Jong-go.

In the 2018 television series The Miracle We Met, Ra plays Jo Yeon-hwa, one of the two wives in a complex supernatural situation. The drama centers on an ordinary man, played by Kim Myung-min, who dies in a car crash but whose spirit is mistakenly transferred into the body of another man with the same name. This leads to him having two families and two wives, with Yeon-hwa being the wife from his new life. The series, which also stars Kim Hyun-joo and Ko Chang-seok, aired on KBS2 from April 2 to May 29, 2018. For her role, Ra was nominated for best supporting actress in 6th APAN Star Awards, and won Excellence Award, Actress in a Mid-length Drama at 32nd KBS Drama Awards.

=== First main role in film and other roles ===
In the 2019 fantasy-comedy film The Dude in Me, Ra portrayed Oh Mi-sun. She is the ex-girlfriend of Jang Pan-soo (Park Sung-woong) an elite gangster whose body is swapped with that of a high school student named Dong-hyun (Jung Jin-young). The film was released on January 9, 2019.

In 2019, Ra took on her first billing film role in Miss & Mrs. Cops, alongside Lee Sung-kyung and Choi Soo-young. Her character Park Mi-young is a legendary detective who transitions to working as a civil affairs officer after having a family. The screenplay was specifically written for her. This project was a long-term endeavor for Byun Bong-hyeon, CEO of Film Momentum, who had long desired to create a story centered on Ra. She underwent three months of intensive training at Seoul Action School, impressing the action director with her athletic ability and dedication, mastering wrestling, boxing, and complex action sequences. Ra's hardwork paid off, as the film attracted 1.69 million viewers.

In the 2019-2020 South Korean television series Black Dog: Being A Teacher, Ra portrayed Park Sung-soon, an experienced and workaholic Korean language teacher. Her character serves as a mentor to the main protagonist, Go Ha-neul (played by Seo Hyun-jin), a new temporary teacher navigating the struggles of a private school. As the Head of College Admissions, Sung-soon guides Ha-neul through the challenges of the competitive education system. The series, which also stars Ha Jun, aired on tvN from December 16, 2019, to February 4, 2020.

In 2020, Ra played the lead role in the film Honest Candidate as Joo Sang-sook, a three-term National Assembly member cursed to only speak the truth. The film portrays the comedic chaos that ensues when a seasoned politician is unable to lie during an election campaign. This South Korean remake of the 2014 Brazilian film O Candidato Honesto premiered on February 12, 2020 Despite its release coinciding with the early stages of the COVID-19 pandemic in Korea, the film proved to be a commercial success, breaking even and becoming a box office hit.

Ra's performance was critically acclaimed, earning her the Best Actress Award at the 41st Blue Dragon Film Awards on February 9, 2021. During her acceptance speech, she hinted at a sequel, stating, "Actually, I'm trying to film Honest Candidate 2. I will try to be your belly button thief next year." The casting for Honest Candidate 2 was confirmed on August 6, with Ra, Kim Mu-yeol, and Yoon Kyung-ho reprising their roles, joined by new cast members Seo Hyun-woo, Park Jin-joo, and Yoon Doo-joon. Principal photography for the sequel began on July 31, 2021, wrapped up on October 31. The film was subsequently released on September 28, 2022.

In the 2022 TVING streaming series Dr. Park's Clinic, Ra starred as Sa Mo-rim, the wife of the titular Dr. Park Won-jang (played by Lee Seo-jin). The comedy follows Dr. Park's struggles as he tries to keep his new clinic afloat. Sa Mo-rim, while trying to be understanding of her husband's financial woes, often spends money on a lifestyle inspired by television, adding to the couple's mounting debt. It premiered on TVING on January 14, 2022.

In 2023 drama The Good Bad Mother, Ra starred as Jin Young-soon, a single mother who runs a pig farm and has a strained relationship with her son, played by Lee Do-hyun. Directed by Shim Na-yeon, the series also features Ahn Eun-jin and Yoo In-soo. Airing on JTBC from April 26 to June 8, 2023, and available for streaming on Netflix, the series was a commercial success and became one of the highest-rated series in Korean cable television history, setting a new record for the highest ratings of any Wednesday-Thursday drama in JTBC history.

In 2024, she starred as Deok-hee, the titular character in Park Young-joo's film Citizen of a Kind. The storyline follows Deok-hee, an ordinary citizen, as she sets out to catch the ringleader of a voice phishing scam. She starred alongside Yeom Hye-ran.

In the 2024 tvN television series Jeongnyeon: The Star Is Born, Ra plays Kang So-bok, the director of the Maeran Theater Company. The show, which is based on a webtoon, is set in the 1950s after the Korean War and follows the journey of a talented young singer named Yoon Jeong-nyeon (Kim Tae-ri) as she joins a women's Gukgeuk troupe and develops her skills.

In May 2025, Ra signed an exclusive contract with T&N Entertainment.

== Endorsements ==
Following her increased prominence as "Cheetah Ahjumma" in Reply 1988, Ra became a sought-after figure in the advertising industry. In 2016, she starred in commercials for various products such as Paldo Bibim-myeon, Society Game, CJ Bio-Lactobacillus, Estée Lauder, and Homestory Housekeeping. Ra received the CF Popularity Star Award at the 2016 MTN Broadcast Advertising Festival.

Her success continued in 2017 with endorsement deals for chicken, pharmaceuticals, clothing, and beverages. Thanks to her widespread recognition from her roles in films and dramas, she has become a versatile model, even appearing in ads for competing products like chicken and clothing, typically reserved for top-tier celebrities.

== Philanthropy ==
In 2017, Ra participated in a green campaign for Allure Korea, joining six other artists from C-JeS Entertainment and designer Yoon Chun-ho. She hand-wrote "Live Green" on limited-edition T-shirts sold at an Allure event, with the proceeds donated to Green Korea United for endangered mountain goat protection. The following year, in 2018, Ra was one of 25 C-JeS artists involved in the "Black Dog Campaign" by the animal rights group CARE and Innocean Worldwide. She participated in a photoshoot with a black dog to combat prejudice and encourage the adoption of black dogs.

In 2021, Ra contributed her talent as a poster model for the "Artists' Employment Insurance" promotional campaign. This system, established by the Ministry of Culture, Sports and Tourism's Korea Arts & Culture Education Service on December 10, 2020, provides unemployment and parental benefits to artists, helping to stabilize their lives and support their creative endeavors.

In 2022, Ra donated the proceeds from her single "Ramirani," which featured rapper Mirani, to The Purme Foundation. The donation, made through the Jal Project with broadcaster Song Eun-i's music label Vivo Wave, was intended to fund rehabilitation treatment for children with disabilities.

== Personal life ==
Ra met her husband while performing in a musical called Dracula. Ra recalled,

The lead role was played by singer Shin Sung-woo, and my husband was Shin Sung-woo's manager at the time. We ran into each other casually in the practice room, became friends, and then one day, I found myself walking into a wedding hall (laughs).

Ra married Kim Jin-goo, who was previously Shin Sung-woo's road manager, in 2002. They have a son named Kim Geun-woo, who is currently pursuing a career as a cyclist.

== Filmography ==
=== Film ===
Year	Title	Role	Notes	Ref.
2005	Lady Vengeance	Oh Su-hee		
2006	Forbidden Quest	housewife 1		
2006	The Host		Cameo	
2006	Mission Sex Control	Un-nyeon		
2007	Bank Attack	Mrs. Bong		
2008	Life Is Cool		Cameo	
2008	Crush and Blush	Jung-nyeo's Aunt		
2008	Portrait of a Beauty	nobleman's wife		
2009	Thirst	Nurse Yu		
2009	Running Turtle		Cameo	
2009	Searching for the Elephant	middle-aged teacher		
2010	Twilight Gangsters		Cameo	
2010	Enemy at the Dead End	head nurse		
2010	Hello Ghost		Cameo	
2011	Children...	psychic	Cameo	
2011	Late Blossom	nurse		
2011	Dance Town	Ri Jeong-rim		
2011	Penny Pinchers	Lady owner		
2012	Dancing Queen	Myung-ae		
2012	The Beat Goes On		Cameo	
2012	Runway Cop		Cameo	
2012	Two Moons	Na Mi-ran		
2012	Horror Stories	mother		
2012	Traffickers	female courier 1	Cameo	
2012	Code Name: Jackal	cleaner		
2013	South Bound	Ra Mi-Ran	Cameo	
2013	Very Ordinary Couple	Ms. Son		
2013	The Spy: Undercover Operation	Yakult		
2013	Act	Doctor Choi	Cameo	
2013	Hope	Gwang-sik's wife		
2013	The Weight	Woman from Incheon		
2014	Hot Young Bloods	Na-young		
2014	My Love, My Bride	Madam		
2014	Big Match	Young-ho's wife		
2014	Ode to My Father	Deok-soo's paternal aunt		
2015	Casa Amor: Exclusive for Ladies	Eum Soon-ok		
2015	Wonderful Nightmare	Mi-sun		
2015	The Himalayas	Jo Myeong-ae		
2015	The Tiger	Chil-goo's wife		
2016	Seondal: The Man Who Sells the River	Female Buddhist Yoon		
2016	The Last Princess	Bok-soon		
2017	Ordinary Person	Song Jeong-sook	Special appearance	
2017	The Mayor	Yang Jin-joo		
2017	Speckles: The Tarbosaurus 2	Fang	Voice	
2018	High Society	Lee Hwa-ran		
2018	Intimate Strangers	Kim So-wol	Voice	
2019	The Dude in Me	Oh Mi-seon		
2019	Miss & Mrs. Cops	Mi-yeong		
2020	Honest Candidate	Joo Sang-sook		
2021	New Year Blues	Yong Mi's sister-in-law	Cameo	
2022	Honest Candidate 2	Joo Sang-sook		
2022	Come Back Home	Yeong Shim		
2022	Highway Family	Yeong-seon		
2024	Citizen of a Kind	Deok-hee		
2025	Hi-Five	Sun-nyeo		
2026	Strange Snack Shop Jeoncheondang	Hong-ja		

=== Television series ===
Year	Title	Role	Notes	Ref.
2009	Cinderella Man	Velvet Lee		
2011	The Duo	Eob Deuk-ne		
2012	Fashion King	Young-gul's employee		
2012	The King 2 Hearts		Cameo	
2012	Only Because It's You	Yoon Gong-ja		
2013	Jang Ok-jung, Living by Love	Jo Sa-seok's wife		
2013	Ugly Miss Young-ae 12	Ra Mi-ran		
2013	The Eldest	Na Mi-soon		
2013	The Suspicious Housekeeper	Yang Mi-ja		
2013	The Heirs	Myung-soo's mother	Cameo	
2014	KBS Drama Special: "You're Pretty, Oh Man-book"	Nam Mi-soon		
2014	Let's Eat		Cameo (episode 16)	
2014	Ugly Miss Young-ae 13	Ra Mi-ran		
2014	Steal Heart	Kkang-soon		
2014	A Witch's Love	Baek Na-rae		
2014	The Idle Mermaid	Seblin		
2014	Lump in My Life	Class president's mother/ hairdresser		
2014	Blade Man	Elisa Park		
2015	Ugly Miss Young-ae 14	Ra Mi-ran		
2015	Reply 1988	Ra Mi-ran		
2016	Come Back Mister	Maya		
2016	The Gentlemen of Wolgyesu Tailor Shop	Bok Sun-nyeo		
2016	Ugly Miss Young-ae 15	Ra Mi-ran		
2017	Avengers Social Club	Hong Do-hee		
2017	KBS Drama Special: "Madame Jung's Last Week"	Madame Jung		
2018	The Beauty Inside	Han se-gye	Cameo (episode 10)	
2018	The Miracle We Met	Jo Yeon-hwa		
2019	Melting Me Softly	Kang Ok Bong (Panelist)	Cameo (episode 6)	
2019	Black Dog: Being A Teacher	Park Seong-soon		
2021	Bossam: Steal the Fate	A widow who gets bossam	Cameo (episode 1)	
2023	The Good Bad Mother	Jin Young-soon		
2024	Jeongnyeon: The Star Is Born	Kang So-bok		
2024	A Virtuous Business	Kim Mi-ran	Cameo (episode 1)	
2025	The Mysterious Candy Store	Hong-ja		
2025	To the Moon	Kang Eun-sang		
2026	The Legend of Kitchen Soldier	Jae-young’s lover	Cameo (episode 5)	

=== Web series ===
Year	Title	Role	Ref.
2022	Dr. Park's Clinic	Sa Mo-rim	
2023	Cruel Intern	Go Hae-ra	

=== Music video appearances ===
Year	Title	Ref.
2025	"Don't Worry Dear"	

=== Television shows ===
Year	Title	Role	Notes	Ref.
2014	Real Man	Cast Member	Season 1, episode 69–73, Female Soldier Special	
2016	Sister's Slam Dunk	Cast Member	Season 1	
2018–2019	Weekend Playlist	Cast Member	Episode 1–17	
2020	I Was a Car	Host	Season 1	
2020	I Was a Car Winter Story	Host	Season 2	
2022	Living for an Empty House in a Fishing Village	Host		
2024	Europe Outside the Tent	Cast Member	Season 4	
2025	Perfect Glow	Host		
2025–2026	Reply 1988 10th Anniversary	Cast member		

== Discography ==
Title	Album details	Peak chart positions		Sales	Album
Title	Album details	KOR	US World	Sales	Album
"Shut Up" (featuring Yoo Hee-yeol)	Released: July 1, 2016; Label: KBS Media; Format: Digital download	3	—	KOR: 724,088+	Non-album single
"Show Time" (with Lee Sung-kyung)	Released: 2019	—	—	—N/a	Miss & Mrs. Cops OST
"RAMIRANI ""라미란이" (with Mirani)	Released: June 1, 2021	—	—	—N/a	Non-album single
"Together" (달까지 가자) (with Lee Sun-bin and Jo Aram)	Released: October 17, 2025; Label: Stone Music Entertainment; Formats: CD, digital download, streaming	—	—	—N/a	To the Moon OST Part 5
"Don't Worry Dear (걱정말아요 그대)" (Stray Dogs featuring Ra Mi-ran)	Released: December 26, 2025; Label: Stone Music Entertainment; Formats: CD, digital download, streaming	—	—	—N/a	Reply 1988 10th Anniversary OST
"—" denotes releases that did not chart or were not released in that region.

== Stage ==
=== Musical ===
Musical's performances of Ra
Year	Title		Role	Venue	Date	Ref.
Year	English	Korean	Role	Venue	Date	Ref.
2006	A Midsummer's Nightmare	한여름밤의 악몽	Dongchun's Joy	Place Arts Centre CJ Towol Theatre	June 20–28	
2006	A Midsummer's Nightmare	한여름밤의 악몽	Dongchun's Joy	Egg and Nucleus Small Theater	July 4–23	
2006–2007	Five Sketches about Love	사랑에 관한 다섯개의 소묘	Virgin lady	Hansung Art Hall 2	December 13 – July 15	
2007–2008	The Donkey Show	동키쇼	Helen	Daehangno Donkey Show Hall	April 28 – June 30	
2008	Romeo and Bernadette	로미오&베르나뎃	Camille	Naru Art Center Grand Theater	July 4 – August 10	
2008	When I Looked the Prettiest	내가 가장 예뻤을 때	Mother	Hansung Art Hall 2	March 13 – June 15	
2008–2009	A Good Day in the Rain	억수로 좋은 날	Kyung-hee	SM Tintin Hall in Daehak-ro	November 22 – February 15	
2009–2010	Briquette Road	연탄길	Female 1	Myungbo Art Hall Haram Hall	November 28 – February 28	

=== Theater ===
Theater's performances of Ra
Year	Title		Role	Venue	Date	Ref.
Year	English	Korean	Role	Venue	Date	Ref.
2000	Boeing Boeing	보잉보잉	Housekeeper			
2001	The Caucasian Chalk Circle	코카서스의 백묵원	Ra Mi-ran	Dongsoong Art Center Dongsoong Hall	Sep 4–9	
2006	(27th) Seoul Theater Festival: I went to a chicken house!	(제27회) 서울연극제: 닭집에 갔었다!	Ju Madame	Arunguji Small Theater	May 12–21	
2009	My First Time	마이 퍼스트 타임	Female	JTN Art Hall 3	Jan 3 – May 10	
2009	Reckless People	막무가내들	Maiden Ghost Kim Ok-bin	Daehakro Small Theater Festival	Sep 4 – Oct 2	

== Accolades ==
=== Awards and nominations ===
Name of the award ceremony, year presented, category, nominee of the award, and the result of the nomination
Award ceremony	Year	Category	Nominee / Work	Result	Ref.
APAN Star Awards	2018	Best Supporting Actress	The Miracle We Met	Nominated	
Baeksang Arts Awards	2014	Best Supporting Actress – Film	Hope	Nominated	
Baeksang Arts Awards	2016	Best Supporting Actress – Film	The Himalayas	Won	
Baeksang Arts Awards	2016	Best Actress – Television	Reply 1988	Nominated	
Baeksang Arts Awards	2017	Best Supporting Actress – Film	The Last Princess	Nominated	
Baeksang Arts Awards	2018	Best Supporting Actress – Television	Avengers Social Club	Nominated	
Baeksang Arts Awards	2024	Best Actress – Film	Citizen of a Kind	Nominated	
Baeksang Arts Awards	2024	Best Actress – Television	The Good Bad Mother	Nominated	
Bechdel Day	2024	Bechdelian in Film	Citizen of a Kind	Won	
Blue Dragon Film Awards	2012	Best Supporting Actress	Dancing Queen	Nominated	
Blue Dragon Film Awards	2013	Best Supporting Actress	Hope	Won	
Blue Dragon Film Awards	2014	Best Supporting Actress	My Love, My Bride	Nominated	
Blue Dragon Film Awards	2015	Best Supporting Actress	Ode to My Father	Nominated	
Blue Dragon Film Awards	2016	Best Supporting Actress	The Last Princess	Nominated	
Blue Dragon Film Awards	2021 (Note: Delayed Until 2021 Due To COVID-19)	Best Actress	Honest Candidate	Won	
Brand Customer Loyalty Award	2021	Best Actress - Film	Ra Mi-ran	Won	
Buil Film Awards	2016	Best Supporting Actress	The Himalayas	Nominated	
Buil Film Awards	2017	Best Supporting Actress	The Last Princess	Nominated	
Busan International Film Festival	2010	Best Actress (Korean Cinema Today - Vision program)	Dance Town	Won	
Chunsa Film Art Awards	2016	Best Supporting Actress	The Himalayas	Nominated	
Chunsa Film Art Awards	2016	Special Popularity Award	The Himalayas	Won	
Chunsa Film Art Awards	2017	Best Supporting Actress	The Last Princess	Nominated	
Chunsa Film Art Awards	2021	Best Actress	Honest Candidate	Nominated	
Golden Cinematography Awards	2023	Popularity Award selected by the cinematographer	Honest Candidate 2	Won	
Grand Bell Awards	2012	Best Supporting Actress	Dancing Queen	Nominated	
Grand Bell Awards	2014	Best Supporting Actress	Hope	Nominated	
Grand Bell Awards	2015	Best Supporting Actress	Ode to My Father	Nominated	
Grand Bell Awards	2016	Best Supporting Actress	The Last Princess	Won	
KBS Drama Awards	2016	Best Supporting Actress	The Gentlemen of Wolgyesu Tailor Shop	Won	
KBS Drama Awards	2016	Best Couple	Ra Mi-ran (with Cha In-pyo); The Gentlemen of Wolgyesu Tailor Shop	Won	
KBS Drama Awards	2017	Excellence Award, Actress in a One-Act/Special/Short Drama	KBS Drama Special – Madame Jung's Last Week	Won	
KBS Drama Awards	2018	Excellence Award, Actress in a Mid-length Drama	The Miracle We Met	Won	
KBS Drama Awards	2018	Best Couple Award	Ra Mi-ran (with Kim Myung-min); The Miracle We Met	Won	
KBS Drama Awards	2018	Best Couple Award	Ra Mi-ran (with Kai); The Miracle We Met	Nominated	
KOFRA Film Awards	2014	Best Supporting Actress	Hope	Won	
KOFRA Film Awards	2017	Best Supporting Actress	The Last Princess	Won	
KBS Entertainment Awards	2016	Top Excellence Award for Variety Show	Sister's Slam Dunk	Won	
Korea Cable TV Awards	2016	Popular Star	Reply 1988	Won	
Max Movie Awards	2015	Best Supporting Actress	Ode to My Father	Nominated	
Max Movie Awards	2016	Best Supporting Actress	The Himalayas	Won	
MBC Entertainment Awards	2014	Excellence Award for Variety Show	Real Men	Won	
SBS Drama Awards	2016	Special Acting Award, Actress in a Fantasy Drama	Come Back Mister	Nominated	
Scene Stealer Festival	2016	Scene Stealer of the Year	Reply 1988	Won	
tvN10 Awards	2016	Scene Stealer, Actress	Reply 1988	Won	

=== State honors ===
Name of country, year given, and name of honor
Country or Organization	Year	Honor or Award	Ref.
South Korea (Note: Honors are given at the Korean Popular Culture and Arts Awards, arranged by the Korea Creative Content Agency and hosted by the Ministry of Culture, Sports and Tourism. They are awarded to those who have contributed to the arts and South Korea's pop culture.)	2017	Minister of Culture, Sports and Tourism Commendation	

=== Listicles ===
Name of publisher, year listed, name of listicle, and placement
Publisher	Year	Listicle	Placement	Ref.
Forbes	2017	Korea Power Celebrity 40	19th	
Korean Film Council	2021	Korean Actors 200 (Note: Introduces 200 actors that best represent the present and future of Korean cinema to the people in the film industry all over the world.)	Included	
