= Yoriyuki =

- Pronunciation: joɾijɯkʲi (IPA)
- Gender: Male
- Language: Japanese

Origin
- Origin: Japanese
- Meaning: Different meanings depending on the kanji used
- Region of origin: Japan

Yoriyuki is a masculine Japanese given name.

== Written forms ==
Yoriyuki can be written using different combinations of kanji characters. Here are some examples:

- 頼之, "rely, of"
- 頼行, "rely, to go"
- 頼幸, "rely, happiness"
- 依之, "to depend on, of"
- 依行, "to depend on, to go"
- 依幸, "to depend on, happiness"

The name can also be written in hiragana よりゆき or katakana ヨリユキ.

== Notable people with the name ==
- Yoriyuki Arima (有馬 頼徸) (1714–1783), Japanese mathematician and daimyō
- Yoriyuki Hosokawa (細川 頼之) (1329–1392), Japanese samurai
- Yoriyuki Kuroda (黒田 和志, 1851—1917), Japanese aristocrat and politician
- Yoriyuki Matsudaira (松平 頼之, 1858-1873), Japanese daimyo of the last Edo period
