= The Last Princess (film) =

2016 South Korean period drama film

- Theatrical release poster
- Hangul: 덕혜옹주
- Hanja: 德惠翁主
- Lit.: Princess Deokhye
- RR: Deokhyeongju
- MR: Tŏkhyeongju
- Directed by: Hur Jin-ho
- Screenplay by: Hur Jin-ho; Choi Gun-ho; Lee Han-eol; Seo Yoo-min
- Based on: Princess Deokhye by Kwon Bi-young
- Produced by: Kim Won-guk
- Starring: Son Ye-jin; Park Hae-il; Yoon Je-moon; Ra Mi-ran; Jung Sang-hoon; Kim So-hyun; Ahn Nae-sang; Baek Yoon-sik
- Cinematography: Lee Tae-yoon
- Edited by: Nam Na-yeong
- Music by: Cho Sung-woo; Choi Yong-rock
- Production companies: Hofilm; DCG Plus; CJ Entertainment
- Distributed by: Lotte Entertainment
- Release date: 3 August 2016
- Running time: 127 minutes
- Country: South Korea
- Languages: Korean; Japanese
- Box office: US$39.3 million

The Last Princess (Korean: 덕혜옹주; RR: Deokhyeongju; lit. 'Princess Deokhye') is a 2016 South Korean period drama film directed by Hur Jin-ho with a screenplay by Hur Gin-ho, Choi Gun-ho, Lee Han-eol, and Seo Yoo-min, based on the best-selling novel by Kwon Bi-young. It stars Son Ye-jin as Princess Deokhye, the last princess of the Joseon period. The film depicts Deokhye's life in Japan after she was forced to move there at age 13 by the Imperial Japanese government, and her attempts to return to Korea.

== Plot ==
In 1925, Korea was under Japanese rule, and the 13-year-old Princess Deokhye — the last princess of the Joseon dynasty — was forced to move to Japan to attend school. Missing her home, she makes several attempts to return after finishing school, but these are thwarted by the pro-Japanese General Han Taek-soo.

One day, however, Deokhye is reunited with her childhood friend Kim Jang-han, a Japanese army officer who is also part of the Korean independence movement. He plans a secret operation to move her and her brother, Yi Un, to Shanghai, home to the Provisional Government of the Republic of Korea. However, this attempt fails when Han Taek-soo discovers the plan, resulting in Deokhye and Kim losing contact with each other.

In 1931, she is forced to marry Count Sō Takeyuki, and she develops schizophrenia after giving birth to their daughter the following year. Kim becomes a newspaper reporter and eventually finds Deokhye in a Japanese mental hospital decades after they were separated. He then persuades the South Korean government to allow her into the country. In 1962, Deokhye is finally able to return to her homeland.

== Cast ==
- Son Ye-jin as Princess Deokhye
  - Kim So-hyun as teen Deokhye
  - Shin Rin-ah as young Deokhye
- Park Hae-il as Kim Jang-han
  - Yeo Hoe-hyun as teen Jang-han
  - Lee Hyo-je as young Jang-han
- Yoon Je-moon as Han Taek-soo
- Ra Mi-ran as Bok-soon
- Jung Sang-hoon as Bok-dong
- Park Joo-mi as Yang Gwi-in
- Park Soo-young as Yi Un
- Naho Toda as Yi Bang-ja
- Ahn Nae-sang as Kim Hwang-jin
- Kim Jae-wook as Count Sō Takeyuki
- Lee Chae-eun as Jung-hye
- Lee Se-na as Seo Kyung-shin
- Oh Hye-won as Oh-hye
- Jung Se-hyung as Lee Gun
- Kim Seung-hoon as Chairman Park
- Do Yong-gu as Yoshida
- Ahn Sang-woo as Emperor Sunjong
- Kwak Ja-Hyoung as ID examiner for those boarding ship to Korea
- Nam Sang-ji as Orphanage schoolmistress
- Baek Yoon-sik as Emperor Gojong
- Go Soo as Yi Wu
- Kim Dae-myung as Kim Bong-guk
- Shin Shin-ae as Hangeul School Principal

== Production ==
Director Hur Jin-ho decided to make a film about Princess Deokhye after watching a documentary about her on television; he could not forget the scene showing the princess reuniting with her court ladies at the Gimpo Airport, when she was finally allowed to return to Korea after 38 years in Japan. The film's screenplay was co-written by Hur, Lee Han-eol, and Seo Yoo-min, based on the best-selling novel Princess Deokhye (2009) by Kwon Bi-young. The story is a mix of fact and fiction, as Kim Jang-han is a fictional character. Princess Deokhye's story had never been made into a film before this.

At the 2012 Busan International Film Festival (BIFF), Hur's film project was selected to receive co-production development support from the Korean Film Council. Pre-production for The Last Princess began in 2014. In August 2015, Son Ye-jin and Park Hae-il were announced to be starring in the film. Son had previously worked with Hur on the 2005 film April Snow. The Last Princess was launched in October 2015 at BIFF's Asian Film Market. Principal photography commenced on 30 November and was completed on 23 March 2016, with filming taking place in Japan and South Korea. The film was initially funded with US$8.6 million, and Son invested ₩1 billion (US$886,500) into the film after production costs rose, so the staff would have a "more comfortable working environment".

Son accepted the role of Princess Deokhye with no hesitation. In an interview, she said "I know how hard it is to find a film that places such importance on a female character and deals with her life's journey...I have no hope that I'll come across another film like this for the rest of my career." However, she felt "tremendous pressure" portraying a historical figure, and it was her first time playing such a role. At a press conference, she said of the role: "The most difficult part about acting out Princess Deokhye was to think over and over what the princess would have done whenever I was confronted with the discrepancy between the existing archives and the film-adaptation version." After seeing the completed film, she said she had no regrets about her performance.

== Reception ==
=== Box office ===
The Last Princess opened in third place at the box office on August 3, and rose to the number one spot during the weekend of August 5–7. Over the weekend, 1.2 million tickets were sold across 961 screens, accounting for 24 percent of all ticket sales in South Korea. The film earned US$12.4 million in a five-day period (August 3–7), with 1.7 million tickets sold. The film grossed US$35.4 million in South Korea. It grossed US$40.35 million worldwide.

=== Critical response ===
The film received generally positive reviews by critics. Sung So-young of the Korea JoongAng Daily praised the film for being "interesting enough to hold the audience's interest from beginning to end", even though she felt Hur's imagination went too far in several scenes. She said major events from Princess Deokhye's life were portrayed well, and the film's biggest virtue was how it made audiences want to know more about her. Woo Jae-yeon, writing for Yonhap, said the film confirms Hur's reputation as a director who "has a proven track record in weaving a love story from a delicate web of emotions that each character experiences". Woo also praised Son Ye-jin's "outstanding" performance for her portrayal of "the unfathomable depths of the emotional ups and downs of Deokhye."

Rumy Doo of The Korea Herald said the film was a "refreshing change from typical dramas about the Japanese occupation of Korea, which are usually intent on delivering a message of patriotism, and tend to be heavy-handed in their emotional arcs". Doo appreciated Hur's "muted approach" in his handling of the character's emotions, and praised the performances of the two leads, saying Park Hae-il showed "deft skill and subtlety" and Son Ye-jin proved herself a "sensitive and technically refined performer". Yun Suh-young of The Korea Times praised the film for being "engaging, entertaining and moving", rare for a historical film, and complemented Hur's "masterful" direction and the cast's "superb" acting.

== Awards and nominations ==
Award	Category	Recipient(s)	Result	Ref(s)
Blue Dragon Film Awards	Best Leading Actress	Son Ye-jin	Nominated	
Blue Dragon Film Awards	Popularity Award	Son Ye-jin	Won	
Blue Dragon Film Awards	Best Supporting Actress	Ra Mi-ran	Nominated	
Grand Bell Awards	Best Film	The Last Princess	Nominated	
Grand Bell Awards	Best Director	Hur Jin-ho	Nominated	
Grand Bell Awards	Best Actress	Son Ye-jin	Won	
Grand Bell Awards	Best Supporting Actor	Yoon Je-moon	Nominated	
Grand Bell Awards	Best Supporting Actress	Ra Mi-ran	Won	
Grand Bell Awards	Best Costume Design	Kwon Yoo-jin, Im Seung-hee	Won	
Grand Bell Awards	Best Music	Choi Yong-rak, Jo Sung-woo	Won	
Korean Film Producers Association Awards	Best Actress	Son Ye-jin	Won	
KOFRA Film Awards	Best Actress	Son Ye-jin	Won	
KOFRA Film Awards	Best Supporting Actress	Ra Mi-ran	Won	
Asian Film Awards	Best Actress	Son Ye-jin	Nominated	
Baeksang Arts Awards	Best Actress	Son Ye-jin	Won	
Baeksang Arts Awards	Best Supporting Actress	Ra Mi-ran	Nominated	
Chunsa Film Art Awards	Best Supporting Actress	Ra Mi-ran	Nominated	
Buil Film Award	Best Supporting Actress	Ra Mi-ran	Nominated	
Golden Cinema Festival	Best Actor	Park Hae-il	Won	
