= Yi Un =

Last crown prince of Korea (1897–1970)

- Crown Prince of Korea
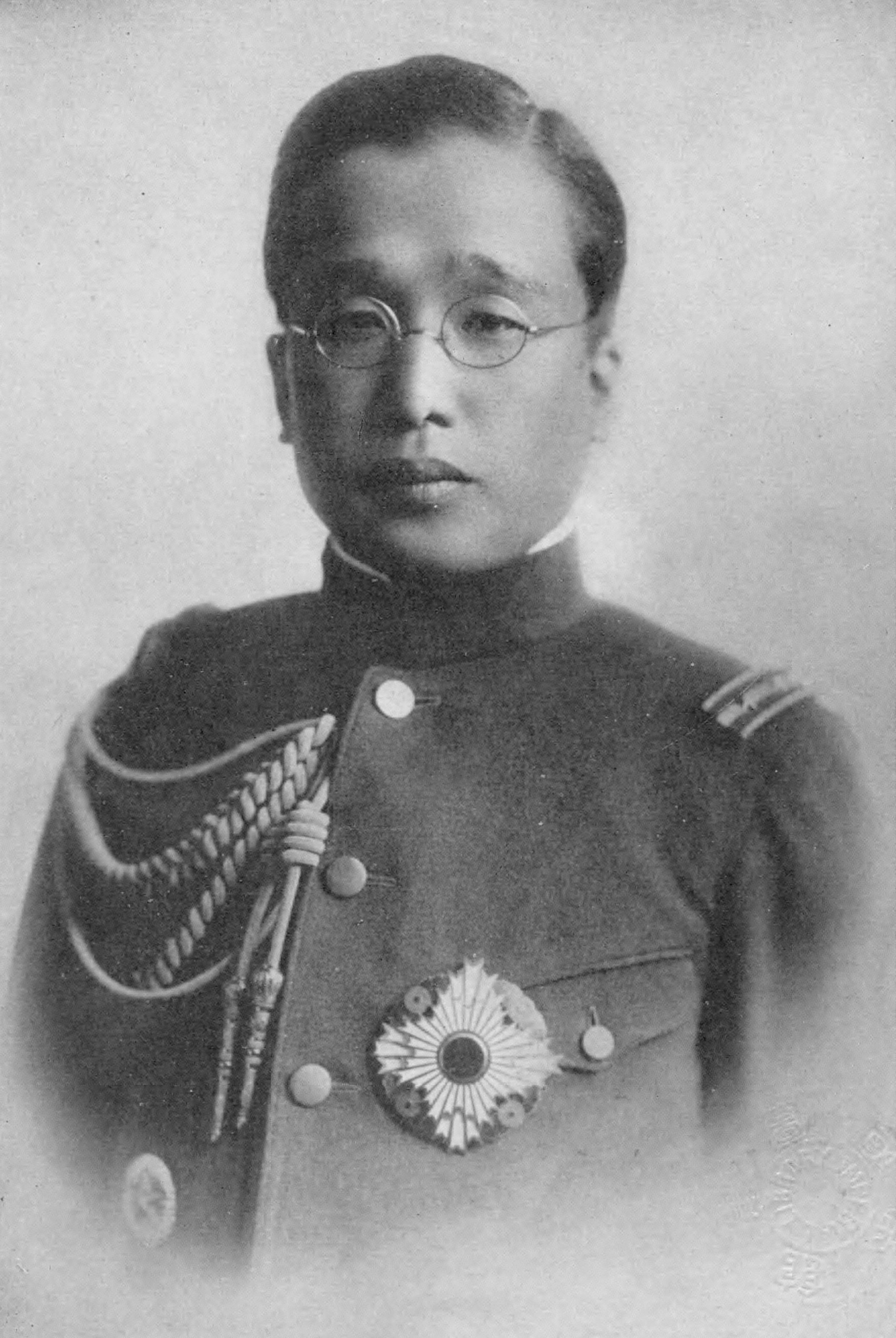
- Yi Un before 1928

Head of the Imperial House of Korea
- Period: 24 April 1926 – 1 May 1970
- Predecessor: Sunjong
- Successor: Yi Ku
- Born: 20 October 1897; Deoksugung, Seoul, Korean Empire
- Died: 1 May 1970 (aged 72); Nakseon Hall, Changdeokgung, Seoul, South Korea
- Burial: Yeongwon, Hongneung and Yureung, Namyangju, South Korea
- Spouse: Princess Masako of Nashimoto (m. 1920)
- Issue: Yi Jin; Yi Ku
Names
- Yi Un (이은; 李垠)
Posthumous name
- Crown Prince Uimin (의민황태자; 懿愍皇太子)
- House: Yi
- Father: Gojong of Korea
- Mother: Imperial Noble Consort Sunheon
- Military career
- Allegiance: Empire of Japan
- Branch: Imperial Japanese Army
- Service years: 1917–1945
- Rank: Lieutenant general
- Commands: First Air Army

Yi Un (Note: Also romanized as Yi Eun, Lee Eun, Un Yi and Ri Gin.) (이은; 李垠; 20 October 1897 – 1 May 1970) was the last crown prince of the Korean Empire, the head of the former Korean imperial house after 1926, and a lieutenant general in the Imperial Japanese Army. He was the seventh son of Gojong of Korea and the son of Imperial Noble Consort Sunheon.

Yi Un was designated crown prince in 1907 and was taken to Japan later that year for education under Japanese supervision. After the annexation of Korea by Japan in 1910, the former Korean imperial house was incorporated into the Japanese-created ōkōzoku system. He married Princess Masako of Nashimoto in 1920 and succeeded Sunjong of Korea in 1926 as Yi Wang (李王), the Japanese-recognized head of the former Korean royal house.

Yi Un served in the Japanese army, reached the rank of lieutenant general, served on the North China front, commanded the First Air Army, and was appointed a military councillor near the end of the Pacific War. After Japan's defeat in 1945, he lost his royal status in Japan and remained there until South Korea permitted his return in 1963. He returned while seriously ill and died at Changdeokgung in 1970.

== Name, title and terminology ==
Yi Un's personal name was 李垠. In Japanese, the same characters were read as Ri Gin (りぎん). His title before 1926 was commonly rendered in Korean colonial sources as Wangseja Jeonha (왕세자, 전하, 王世子殿下), meaning "His Highness the Crown Prince". The Korean honorific jeonha (전하, 殿下) corresponds to Japanese denka (殿下), conventionally translated as "His Highness".

The title Yeongchinwang, (영친왕, 英親王, "Prince Imperial Yeong") combined the title-name Yeong (英) with chinwang (친왕, 親王), an imperial-prince rank used in the Korean Empire for Gojong's sons and elder brother.

After Sunjong's death in 1926, Yi Un's official colonial style was Changdeokgung Yi Wang Un Jeonha (昌德宮 李王垠 殿下; Japanese: 昌徳宮李王垠殿下). The title used Changdeokgung as a palace-name prefix and Yi Wang (李王, "Yi king") as the Japanese-recognized title for the head of the former Korean royal house. It did not denote Korean sovereign authority.

The palace-name prefix had older East Asian analogues in court language. In Korea and China, Donggung (동궁]], 東宮, "Eastern Palace") referred to the crown prince's residence and, by extension, to the crown prince. The specific formulas Changdeokgung Yi Wang and Deoksugung Yi Taewang were introduced in the 1910 annexation order for the former Korean monarchs.

== Early life and education ==
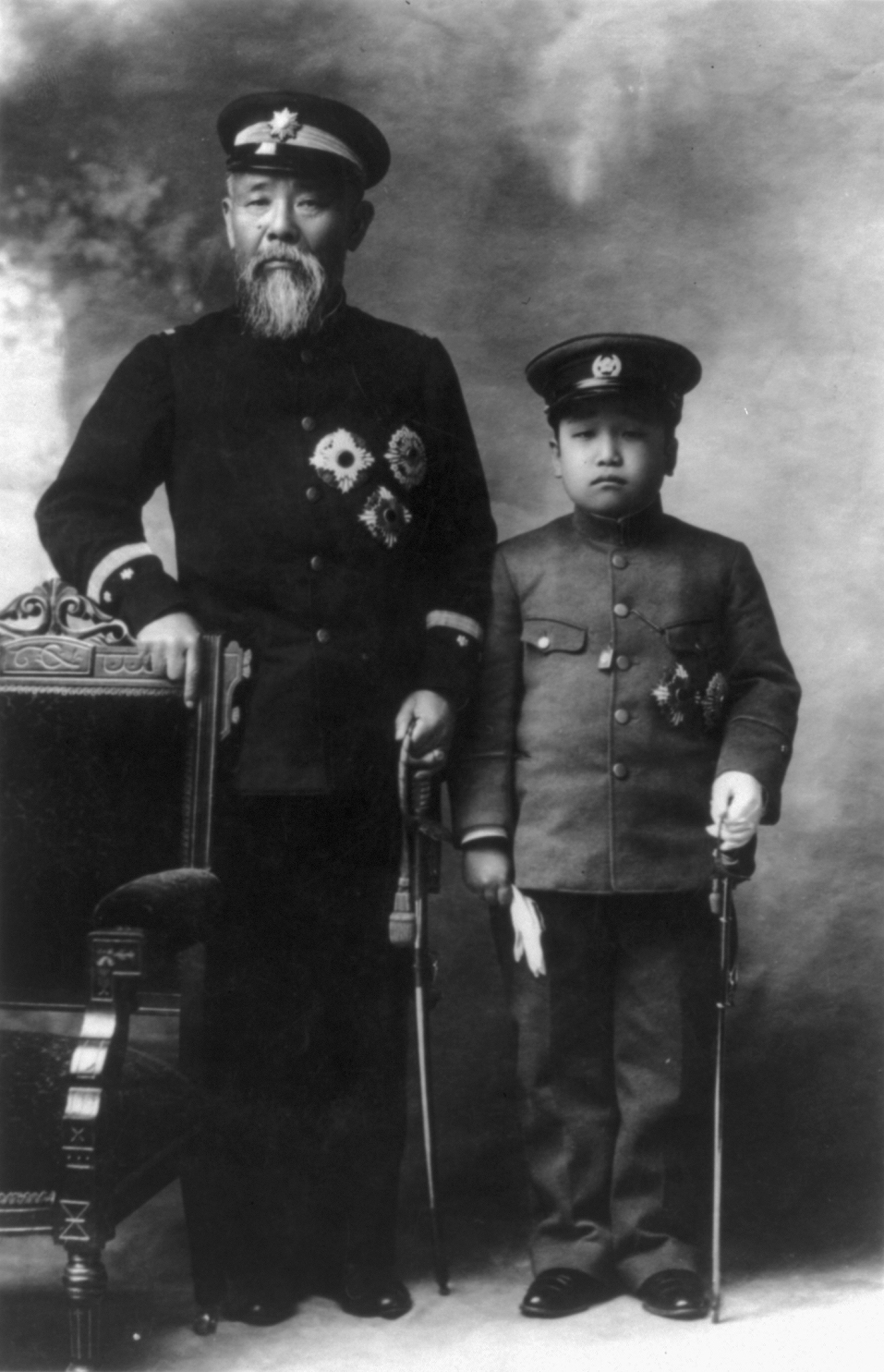
Yi Un with Itō Hirobumi

Yi Un was born at Deoksugung, then Gyeongungung, in Seoul on 20 October 1897. His mother, Eom Seon-yeong, had entered the palace as a court lady and later became one of Gojong's consorts. She was posthumously known as Imperial Noble Consort Sunheon. Yi Un was a younger half-brother of Sunjong of Korea and Yi Kang.

In 1900 he received the title Prince Imperial Yeong. In 1907, after Gojong's abdication and Sunjong's accession, Yi Un was designated crown prince. The proclamation linked the appointment to the continuation of the royal line and the duty to maintain sacrifices at Jongmyo.

In December 1907, on the initiative of Itō Hirobumi, Yi Un was taken to Japan for education. The move was meant to ensure that the Korean royal family would not take any further anti-Japanese actions following The Hague Secret Emissary Affair, and amounted to detention as a hostage in practice. Japanese Emperor Meiji, who largely ignored his own grandchildren, devoted a lot of attention to Yi Un, acting as his guardian. Itō would bring Yi Un whenever he was visiting the princes Hirohito, Chichibu and Takamatsu. Meiji apparently stopped seeing Yi Un so frequently after Ito's assassination. Yi Un attended Gakushūin and later followed a Japanese military education.

== Status under Japanese rule ==
The annexation of Korea in 1910 ended the Korean Empire and changed the legal position of the former imperial family. Japanese authorities created the ōkōzoku (王公族]], Korean 왕공족, "royal and princely families") status for Gojong, Sunjong, Yi Un and other members of the former ruling house. The status placed the Korean royal and princely families above the Japanese peerage and below the Japanese imperial family.

The Japanese court issued regulations for the Korean royal and princely families. The Yi Royal Household Office, instituted in 1910, administered household personnel, property, accounts, palace buildings, gardens, documents, books and genealogical records. It also organized receptions, gifts, banquets, court music, ancestral rites, and inspections of royal shrines, tombs and graves. The office operated within an administrative structure linked to the Japanese Imperial Household Ministry and the Governor-General of Chōsen. It also became a site of factional competition among Korean nobles.

In January 1927, the Japanese court issued the Ordinance concerning the dress of the royal and princely families (王公族ノ服装ニ関スル件). The ordinance applied the Japanese Imperial Family Dress Regulations to the Korean royal and princely families and replaced cherry-blossom devices with the Yi-flower emblem on the coat, cap, sword and buttons. The Yi flower, or ihwa (이화, 李花), had been used as an emblem of the Korean imperial house on decorations, stamps, court dress and military uniforms.

== Court supervision and household management ==
After his 1920 marriage, Kuratomi Yūzaburō was appointed adviser to Yi Un. His task was to guide Yi Un so that he acquired the virtues of a Korean royal under Japanese rule; although he was not formally assigned to household affairs, his diary also recorded household administration. Ko Huigyeong, an official attached to Yi Un, was Kuratomi's main Korean counterpart in the household.

Kuratomi and Ko discussed how to handle Koreans seeking audiences or access to the household, including Korean nobles, Government-General officials and poor students. They also discussed mourning practice after Gojong's death because Korean opinion might interpret Japanese-style one-year mourning by Yi Un, contrasted with Sunjong's three-year mourning in Seoul, as insufficient filial piety and excessive Japanization.

== Household income and property ==
Before 1945, Yi Un's household income came through the finances of the former Korean royal house. The Government-General of Chōsen paid the Yi royal house an annual allowance, or sebi (세비, Japanese 歳費), from its special account. The allowance was 750,000 won in 1910, 1,500,000 won from 1911 to 1920, and 1,800,000 won from 1921 onward.

The household also received income from former crown properties in Korea administered by the Yi Royal Household Office. These properties were divided into basic property, such as securities, loans and cash, and general property, such as fields, paddies and forests. Forest land was the largest part of the general property, and timber or forestry income entered the household accounts. In the 1932 budget, the 1,800,000-won allowance was supplemented by forest income, bond interest, stock dividends, deposit interest, admission fees from Changgyeongwon, and real-estate rents.

After the 1926 regulations on royal and princely households, much of the property was designated hereditary property. By 1930, about 86 percent of Yi royal-household land had been placed in that category. The 1926 hereditary-property rules and a 1927 amendment to the Real Estate Registration Act regulated the registration of these properties.

== Marriage and family ==
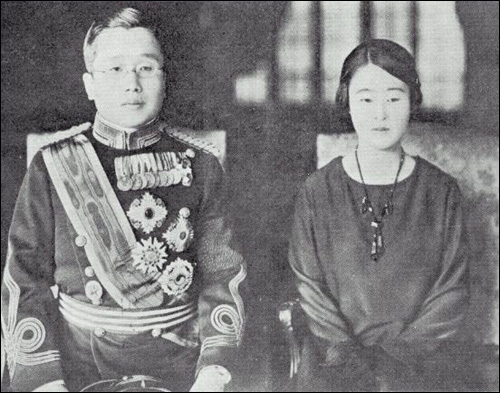
Yi Un and Yi Bangja, 1923

Yi Un married Princess Masako of Nashimoto, the eldest daughter of Prince Nashimoto Morimasa, in Tokyo in April 1920. The marriage was arranged in the context of Japanese colonial policy and was publicly presented as a sign of Japan–Korea harmony. The 1918 supplement to the Japanese Imperial Household Law, which allowed Japanese imperial women to marry into Korean royal and princely houses, had been enacted with such marriages in mind.

The couple had two sons. Their elder son, Yi Jin, was born in 1921 and died in infancy during a visit to Korea in 1922. Their second son, Yi Ku, was born in 1931 and later succeeded his father as head of the former imperial household.

The marriage was part of a wider pattern in which members of the former Korean royal house were placed within Japanese imperial and aristocratic society. Yi Un's half-sister Princess Deokhye was sent to Japan for education and in 1931 married Sō Takeyuki, a Japanese aristocrat from the former ruling family of Tsushima Island. Yi Un's nephew Yi Wu was educated in Japan and served as an officer in the Imperial Japanese Army, although he married a Korean woman, Park Chan-ju.

In his diary, Kuratomi Yūzaburō recorded his worries that Yi Un's newly married domestic life might distract him from military duty.

== Ceremonial life and public representation ==
Yi Un's ceremonial role centred on the ancestral rites of the former Korean royal house. His designation as crown prince in 1907 was justified in part by the need for an heir to assume responsibility for the sacrifices at Jongmyo. Under Japanese rule, the Yi Royal Household Office continued to administer rites and inspections at royal shrines, tombs and graves.

In Japanese and colonial visual culture, the former royal house was presented as a dynasty incorporated into the Japanese empire. Public appearances by Gojong and Sunjong were largely confined to dynastic ritual or choreographed visits to exhibitions and other venues associated with colonial modernity. Visual representation of Yi Un focused on his education, military training, travels and his marriage, all within Japanese imperial institutions.

Colonial Korean press coverage of Yi Un's marriage, especially in Maeil Sinbo, framed the marriage as a union between an accomplished Japanese princess and the Korean crown prince. The wedding circulated visually through photographs and official postcard sets. Nationalist and independence publications described the marriage as forced and as part of Japanese assimilation policy.

== Visits to Korea and abroad ==
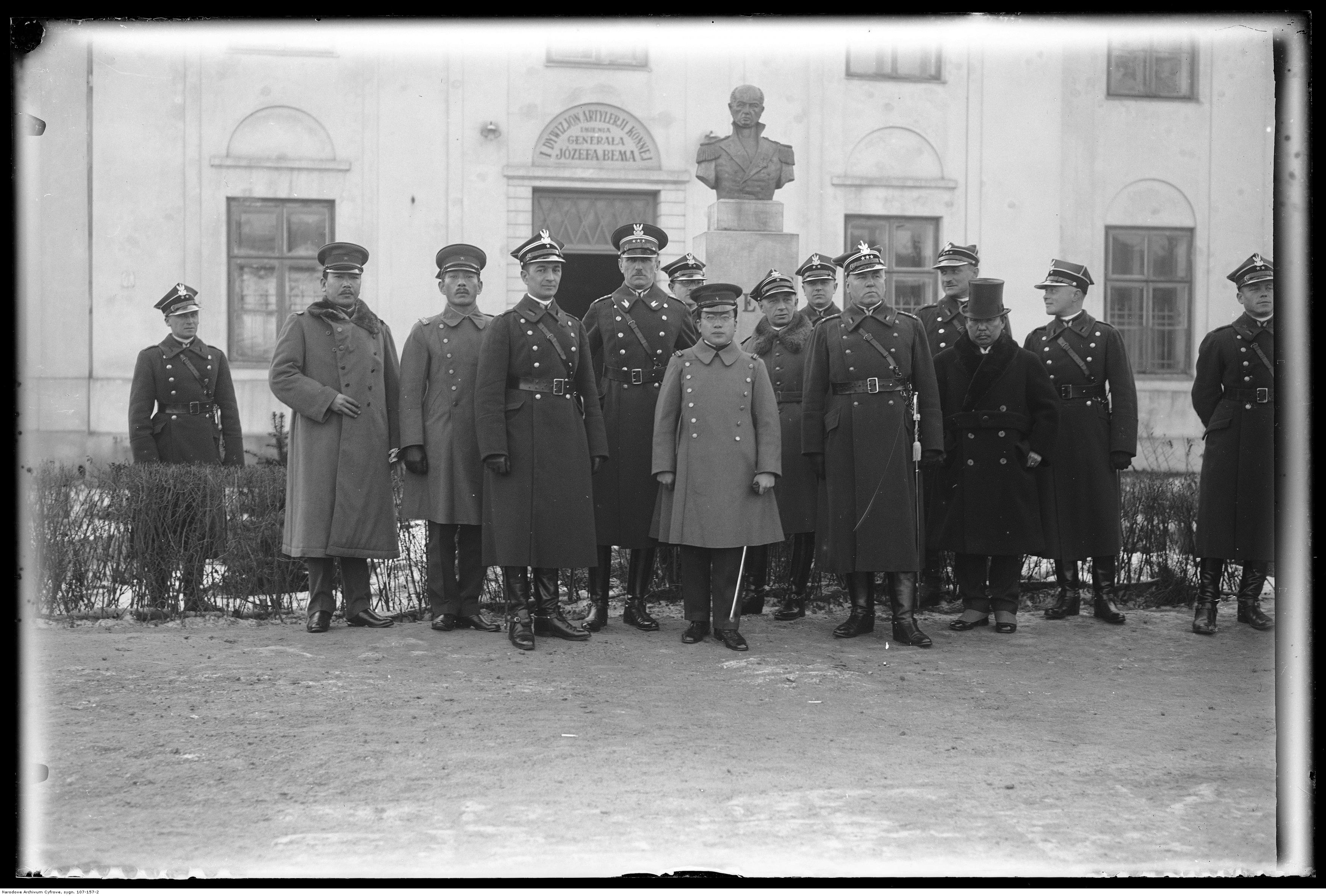
Yi Un visiting the 1st Horse Artillery Squadron in Warsaw, Poland in 1927

After being taken to Japan, Yi Un made occasional visits to Korea, including in 1911 after the death of his mother, in 1918 after his graduation from the Japanese Army Academy, in 1919 for Gojong's funeral, in 1922 with Yi Bangja and their son Yi Jin, and in 1926 around Sunjong's final illness and death.

During early return visits to Korea, Yi Un used Seokjojeon at Deoksugung as a temporary residence. In 1922, Yi Un and Yi Bangja stayed there with Yi Jin; the child died suddenly at Deoksugung Seokjojeon the day before the family was to return to Japan.

In May 1927, Yi Un and Yi Bangja left Yokohama for an extended tour of Europe. They travelled with a seven-person entourage that included officials of the Yi Royal Household Office, departing aboard the Japanese liner Hakone Maru and returning to Japan in April 1928. The outward route passed through Shanghai, Singapore, Penang, Colombo, the Suez Canal, Cairo and Naples before the party landed at Marseille on 4 July 1927. The European itinerary included France, Switzerland, the United Kingdom, Belgium, the Netherlands, Germany, Denmark, Norway, Sweden, Poland, Austria, Czechoslovakia and Italy. Although the journey was not a formal state visit, Japanese diplomatic personnel assisted the party, and Yi Un was received by several European rulers and heads of state. During the tour he also visited cultural institutions, historical sites, universities and hospitals, and took part in golf-related activities in several countries.

In January–February 1935, Yi Un made an inspection tour of Taiwan. The visit lasted from 17 January to 1 February and followed a route similar to those arranged for members of the Japanese imperial family. After landing at Keelung, he visited fortress and artillery sites and a memorial associated with Prince Kitashirakawa Yoshihisa. In Taipei, he visited Taiwan Shrine, the Governor-General's Office, Taiwan Army offices, the First Infantry Regiment, the Taiwan Mountain Artillery unit, Kenkō Shrine, the botanical garden, the Central Research Institute, the Monopoly Bureau and Taihoku Imperial University. The tour continued through central and southern Taiwan, including Taichung, facilities near Chiayi, Alishan, Tainan Shrine, Tainan Confucian Temple, Fort Zeelandia, the Sugar Research Institute, Kaohsiung Harbor, Pingtung airfield, Penghu, and the hydroelectric works at Sun Moon Lake.

== Tokyo residence ==
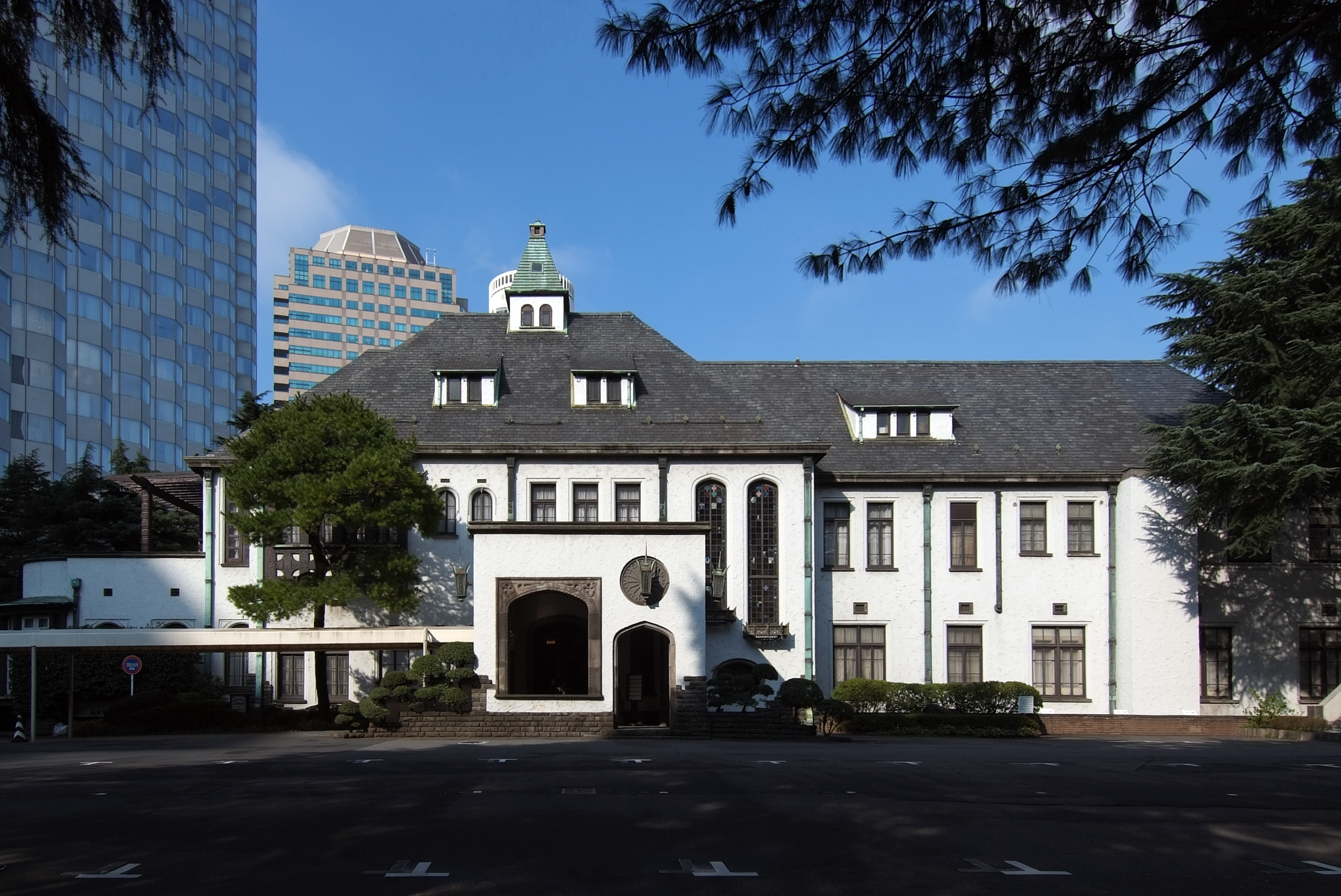
The former Yi royal family residence in Kioichō, Tokyo, later the Akasaka Prince Hotel, photographed in 2010

Yi Un and Yi Bangja's principal Tokyo residence was the former Yi royal family residence in Kioichō, Chiyoda, Tokyo. The site had earlier formed part of the estates of the Kishū Tokugawa family and then the Kitashirakawa-no-miya branch of the Japanese imperial family. The Western-style residence was built in 1930 as the Tokyo residence of the Yi royal family, with designs by the former Imperial Household Ministry's construction bureau, including Kitamura Kōzō and Gondō Yōkichi. The exterior was inspired by English Tudor. The interior mixes several idioms rather than following a single style and includes classical columns, Jacobean-style twisted columns, and Japanese ajirō-style wickerwork ceilings. One distinctive decorative work is a marble relief by Takeishi Kōzaburō in the entrance hall, depicting nine putti or amorini playing with garlands, that might incorporate the likenesses of Yi Un, Yi Bangya and their sons.CITEREFKo2012

The building was later used as an official residence for the president of the House of Councillors, and in 1955 it opened as the Akasaka Prince Hotel. It was designated a Tokyo Metropolitan Tangible Cultural Property in 2011 and was restored as part of the Tokyo Garden Terrace Kioicho redevelopment. It reopened in 2016 as the Akasaka Prince Classic House.

== Military career ==
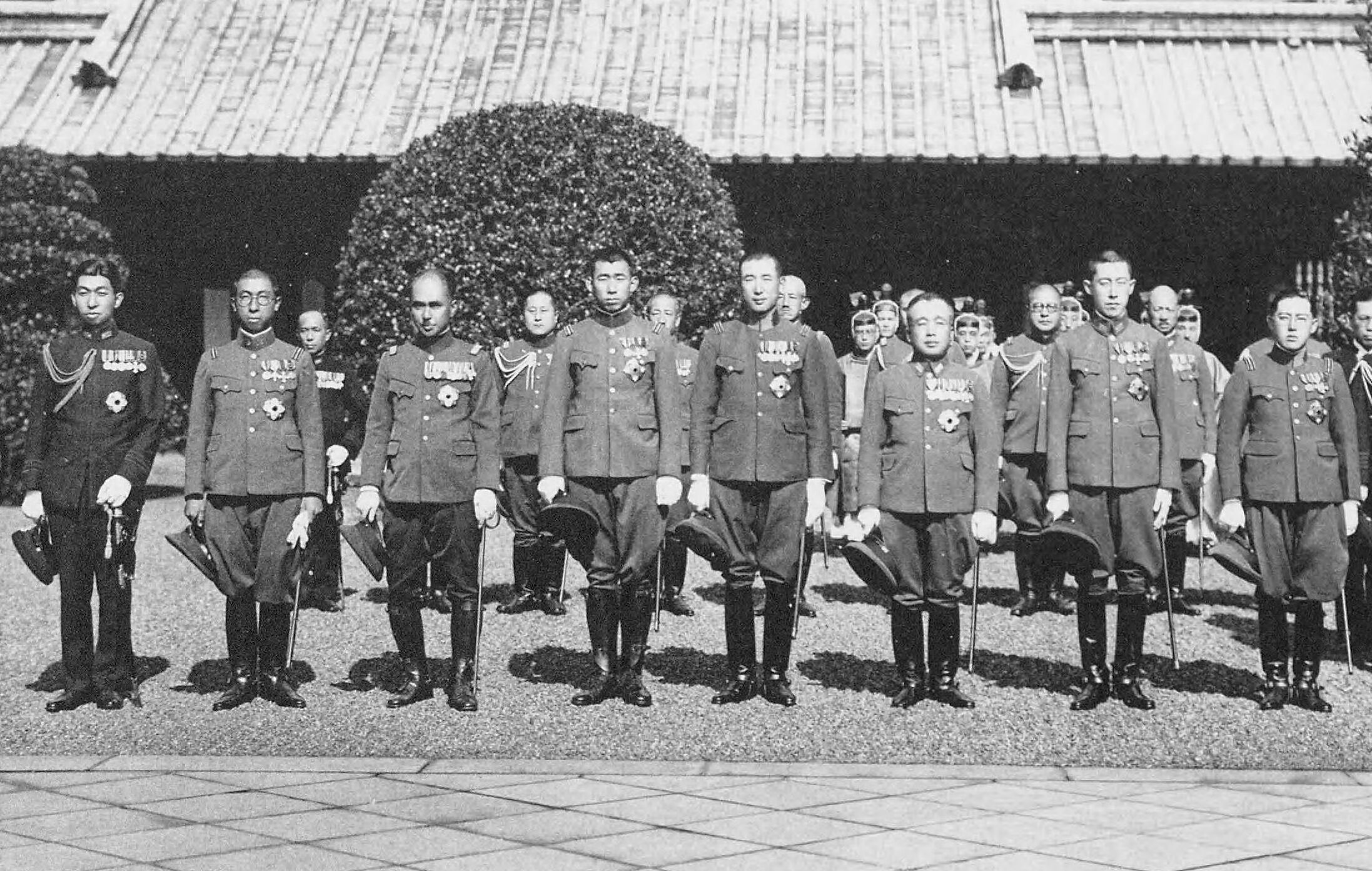
From right to left: Yi Un's nephews Yi Wu and Yi Geon, and Yi Un, with members of the Japanese imperial family at Yasukuni Shrine, 1938

Yi Un entered the Japanese Army Central Youth School in 1911, graduated from the Imperial Japanese Army Academy in 1917, and graduated from the Army War College in 1923. He served as an officer in the Imperial Japanese Army.

He was promoted to lieutenant general in 1940. In 1941 he was sent to the North China front. On 20 July 1943 he was appointed commander of the First Air Army. In September 1944 he inspected Yōkaichi Airfield. On 1 April 1945 he was transferred from First Air Army commander to military councillor. Japanese anti-guerrilla operations in North China involved severe violence against civilians, including the use of chemical weapons and forced-labour mobilization. As part of the so-called "Three Alls" policy ("kill all, burn all, loot all"), Japanese military commanders issued orders to kill suspected male enemies and burn "enemy villages".

In a 1945 Cabinet Secretariat file preserving a first survey of war-crimes names, Yi Wang Un was listed under “emperor, royal and princely family” (天皇、王皇族); the list was not an indictment, and Yi Un was not tried before the International Military Tribunal for the Far East. His father-in-law, Prince Nashimoto Morimasa, was arrested after the war as a suspected war criminal, but later released.

== Private pursuits ==
Yi Un learnt golf in 1924, and in 1925 he participated in a golf competition hosted by the Japanese crown prince. During his 1927–1928 European tour, he played golf, visited golf courses, received golf lessons and visited golf-ball manufacturing facilities. After returning from Europe, he supported the site, construction costs and operating expenses of the Gunjari Golf Course in Keijō, present-day Seoul.

He was also the first Korean to succeed in orchid breeding and credits him with developing the varieties Changyeong (창경; 昌慶) and Changbang (창방; 昌房). Yi Un admired large colour plant charts by Yamada Toshio at the Tokyo Science Museum and invited Yamada to draw orchids when those cultivated in the Yi royal family's Tokyo greenhouse were in bloom.

== Postwar life in Japan ==
Wartime Allied planning did not produce a plan for restoration of the Yi dynasty. During British-American working-level discussions in preparation for the Cairo Conference, British officials briefly floated the possibility of installing a member of a branch of the former Korean royal family as a figurehead for a future Korean government; the idea was dismissed by American diplomat Stanley Hornbeck.

After Japan's defeat in 1945, Yi Un and Yi Bangja remained in Japan. In September 1946, Yi Un publicly denied Japanese newspaper reports that he intended to live permanently away from Korea and stated that his hope was for the creation of a stable Korean administration. In the statement, he described his duty as that of a citizen of a new Korea.

In November 1945 the United States military government in Korea abolished the Yi Royal Household Office and transferred its functions to an Old Royal Palace Affairs Office. After the establishment of the First Republic of Korea, former imperial property was managed through state bodies. The 1954 Former Imperial Property Act classified former imperial property into permanent-preservation property and other property, placed the property under state management, and created a special account whose expenditures included management costs and subsistence expenses for former royal-family members. Subsequent reforms abolished the special former-imperial-property organs, and permanent-preservation properties were incorporated into South Korea's state cultural-property system.

The abolition of the Japanese-recognized Ōkōzoku status in 1947 ended Yi Un's legal position as Yi Wang. The government of Syngman Rhee refused the couple permission to settle in Korea. Their finances deteriorated, and they supported themselves by selling assets. In 1954 the former Yi royal residence in Tokyo was sold, and the couple moved to the smaller Mikaryō residence in Denenchōfu. The former Kioichō residence was later acquired by Seibu Railway and opened in 1955 as the Akasaka Prince Hotel.

Persons on Korean family registers in Japan lost Japanese nationality when the San Francisco Peace Treaty took effect in 1952. When Yi Un wanted to travel to the United States to attend Yi Ku's graduation from Massachusetts Institute of Technology, the South Korean government refused to issue him a passport. He subsequently naturalized in Japan in 1957 in order to be able to travel to Yi Ku's graduation.

== Religion ==
Yi Un became a Roman Catholic late in life. He was baptized in Tokyo in 1961 by the Franciscan priest Seok Jong-gwan and received the baptismal name Joseph. Yi Bangja was baptized in 1983 and received the baptismal name Maria.

== Illness and return to Korea ==
Yi Un's was first hospitalized for cerebral thrombosis at Sanno Hospital in Tokyo in August 1957, and by May 1963 he had suffered three attacks and had developed aphasia.

South Korea restored Yi Un's Korean citizenship in December 1962; he and Yi Bangja subsequently returned to Korea on 22 November 1963. He arrived in serious ill health and was taken by ambulance to St. Mary's Hospital in Myeongdong, Seoul. His homecoming included a motorcade and crowds along the route from the airport to the hospital, with students and citizens waving the Taegukgi and former palace women from Nakseonjae greeting him with deep bows.

After his return, his formal residence was Nakseonjae at Changdeokgung. In practice, he spent most of the period after his return under medical care. He was treated in room 613 of St. Mary's Hospital for six years, five months and nine days. After his return to Korea he could not speak, although press accounts described him as retaining some consciousness. From the summer of 1966 he was unable to swallow water by mouth and was given liquid food through a nasal tube.

== Death and funeral ==
Yi Un died at Nakseonjae on 1 May 1970. Yi Un's funeral was held as a nine-day ceremony at Changdeokgung with honours accorded to a crown prince. It combined a Catholic funeral Mass with Korean court-funeral elements. It was organized by an ad hoc funeral committee, chaired by Lee Hyo-sang, then Speaker of the National Assembly of South Korea and a Catholic layman. On 9 May 1970, Yi Un's funeral Mass was held at Nakseonjae at 7 a.m., concelebrated by Cardinal Stephen Kim Sou-hwan, Archbishop Paul Roh Ki-nam and Bishop Daniel Tji Hak Soun. An 80-member choir from the Catholic University theology faculty sang Requiem music and about 700 Catholic mourners attended.

The procession included a bancha (반차, 班次, "processional order"), a large funeral bier, mourning banners, musicians, students and military-band personnel. Some of Yi Un's relatives wore chamchoebok (참최복, 斬衰服), a mourning dress associated with royal mourning precedent.

The funeral was attended by Prince Takamatsu Nobuhito and Princess Takamatsu Kikuko as representatives of the Japanese imperial family and Prime Minister Chung Il-kwon, who offered incense.

Yi Un was buried at Yeongwon in the Hongneung and Yureung royal tomb precinct in Namyangju.

== Archival footage ==
Several pre-1945 moving-image records of Yi Un survive. A 1927 Reuters item held by the Korean Contemporary History Film Archive shows Yi Un and Yi Bangja during their visit to Brussels, where they are seen getting out of a car with attendants. A 1929 Japanese silent film about the visit of the Graf Zeppelin to Japan includes footage of Yi Un viewing the airship in its hangar at Kasumigaura. A seven-minute silent film made in 1932 records Yi Un's visit to the Bantsuma Kanto Studio at Yatsu Beach in Chiba Prefecture.

== Legacy ==
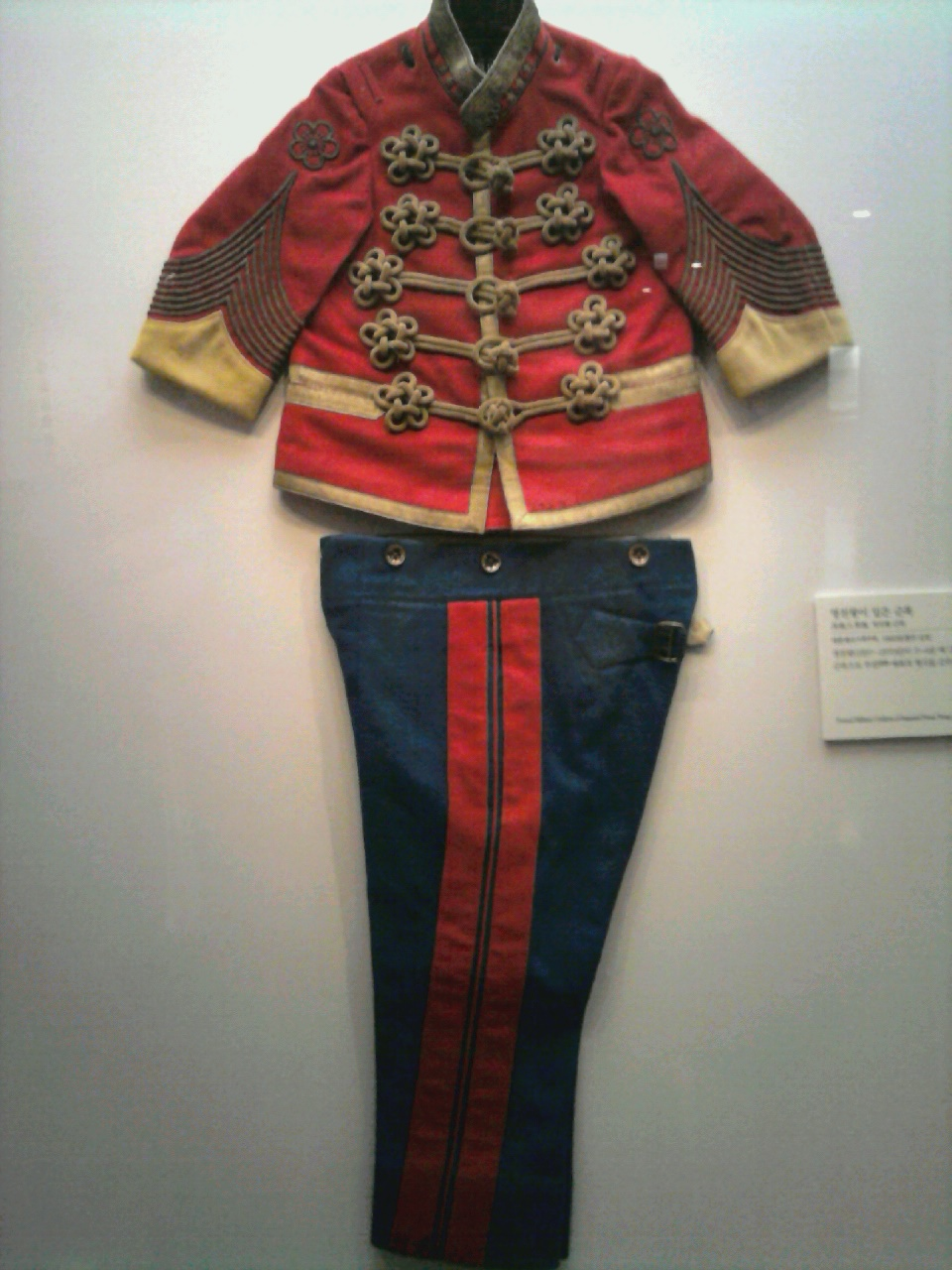
Court uniform of Yi Un displayed at the National Palace Museum of Korea

Yi Un is posthumously known as Crown Prince Uimin. His spirit tablet was placed in Jongmyo in 1973 with presidential approval.

Yi Bangja remained in Korea after Yi Un's death and became associated with welfare work for disabled children and people with disabilities. Institutions associated with the couple included Jahanghoe, founded in 1966, and Myeonghwiwon, founded in 1967 and named after Yi Un's pen name.

== In fiction ==
In the 2006 Japanese television film Niji o Kakeru Ōhi, produced by Fuji Television, he was portrayed by Junichi Okada, opposite Miho Kanno as Yi Bangja. The drama presented their marriage as a political union arranged under the slogan of Japan–Korea friendship and framed the couple's lives around colonial rule, bereavement and postwar loss of status.

In the 2016 South Korean film The Last Princess, Yi Un was portrayed by Park Soo-young. The film, centred on Princess Deokhye, depicts Yi Un as Deokhye's brother in Japan and makes him the object of a fictional plan to move members of the former royal family to the Provisional Government of the Republic of Korea in Shanghai. Director Hur Jin-ho described the Shanghai exile operation involving Yi Un and other royal-family members as a fictionalized device.

== Children ==
- Yi Jin (이진; 李晋; I Jin; I Chin; 18 August 1921 – 11 May 1922), the elder son of Yi Un and Yi Bangja.
- Yi Ku (이구; 李玖; I Gu; I Ku; 29 December 1931 – 16 July 2005), the second son of Yi Un and Yi Bangja.

== Honours ==
- Korean Empire: Grand Cordon of the Order of the Golden Ruler – 17 April 1900
- Empire of Japan: Grand Cordon of the Order of the Rising Sun, with Paulownia Flowers – 17 October 1907
- Denmark: Grand Cross of the Order of the Dannebrog – 10 November 1927
- Sweden: Commander Grand Cross of the Order of Vasa, with Collar – 13 November 1927
- Czechoslovakia: Grand Cross of the Order of the White Lion – 16 December 1927

== Works cited ==
- Shin, Myeong-ho. 친왕부 [Office of the Imperial Princes]. Encyclopedia of Korean Culture (in Korean). Academy of Korean Studies.
- 朝鮮の“ラストエンペラー”李垠の謎の生涯。日韓の動乱の歴史... [The mysterious life of Yi Un, Korea's “last emperor”]. Asahi Shimbun Book Review (in Japanese). 26 April 2022.
- Benesch, Oleg (2024). "Yasukuni Shrine, the Yūshūkan Military Museum, and the Unending Postwar" (PDF). The Asia-Pacific Journal: Japan Focus. 22 (7).
- 陸軍異動通報 [Army transfer notice]. Japan Center for Asian Historical Records (in Japanese). National Archives of Japan. 1 April 1945.
- 戦争犯罪人名簿（第一回調査） [War-criminal name list: first survey]. Japan Center for Asian Historical Records (in Japanese). National Archives of Japan. 1945.
- Kawa, Kaoru (2013). 滋賀県における朝鮮人強制動員の記録⑵ [Records of Korean forced mobilization in Shiga Prefecture (2)] (PDF). Human Culture: Bulletin of the Faculty of Human Cultures, University of Shiga Prefecture (in Japanese) (34): 73–82.
- Ku, Daeyeol (2021). "British Korea Policy: Restoration of the Empire and the Korean Question". Korea 1905–1945: From Japanese Colonialism to Liberation and Independence. Amsterdam University Press. pp. 309–339. doi:10.1017/9781912961221.015.
- Lee, Seung-yup (2012). 李太王（高宗）毒殺説の検討 [Examination of the theory that Yi Taewang (Gojong) was poisoned] (PDF). 倉富勇三郎日記研究 (in Japanese). Japan Society for the Promotion of Science: 164–184.
- Nagai, Kazuo (2012). 倉富勇三郎日記研究 [Kuratomi Yūzaburō diary research] (PDF) (Report) (in Japanese). Japan Society for the Promotion of Science.
- 航空軍司令官に李王垠殿下親補 [Prince Yi Wang Un appointed Air Army commander]. Ritsumeikan Peace Museum Archives (in Japanese). 20 July 1943.
- 英親王李垠伝 [Biography of Prince Yeongchin Yi Un]. Shōwakan Digital Archive (in Japanese).
- 태자 [Crown prince]. Encyclopedia of Korean Culture (in Korean). Academy of Korean Studies. 1995.
- 세자궁 [Crown prince's palace]. Encyclopedia of Korean Culture (in Korean). Academy of Korean Studies. 1996.
- 난초 [Orchid]. Encyclopedia of Korean Culture (in Korean). Academy of Korean Studies.
- 구 황실관리위원회 [Former Imperial Household Management Committee]. Encyclopedia of Korean Culture (in Korean). Academy of Korean Studies.
- 구황실재산법 [Former Imperial Property Act]. Encyclopedia of Korean Culture (in Korean). Academy of Korean Studies.
- No, Young-ki (7 February 2023). 이효상 [Lee Hyo-sang]. Encyclopedia of Korean Culture (in Korean). Academy of Korean Studies.
- 赤坂プリンス クラシックハウス（東京都指定有形文化財 旧李王家東京邸） [Akasaka Prince Classic House: Tokyo Metropolitan Tangible Cultural Property, Former Yi royal family Tokyo residence]. Building and Equipment Long-life Cycle Association (in Japanese).
- Bix, Herbert P. (2000). Hirohito and the Making of Modern Japan. HarperCollins. ISBN 978-0-06-019314-0.
- 皇室制度に関する有識者ヒアリングを踏まえた論点整理に向けた資料 [Materials toward organizing issues based on expert hearings on the imperial household system] (PDF) (Report) (in Japanese). Cabinet Secretariat, Government of Japan. 2021.
- 장애자의 어머니 이방자 여사 선종 [Yi Bangja, mother of people with disabilities, dies]. Catholic Times (in Korean). 7 May 1989.
- 조선조 왕족의 천주교 개종사 - 고종 여섯자녀 중 4명 입교 [History of Catholic conversions among Joseon royal family members: four of Gojong's six children entered the Church]. Catholic Times (in Korean). 25 June 1990.
- 영친왕 이은 공 선종 [Prince Yi Un, Prince Yeongchin, dies]. Catholic Times (in Korean). 10 May 1970.
- 영친왕 이은 씨 장례미사 엄수 [Funeral Mass for Yi Un, Prince Yeongchin, solemnly held]. Catholic Times (in Korean). 17 May 1970.
- 이효상 李孝祥(1906~1989) [Lee Hyo-sang]. Catholic Encyclopedia of Korea (in Korean).
- Chen, Wei-han (June 2011). 日本皇族的殖民地臺灣視察 [Japanese imperial family inspection visits to colonial Taiwan] (PDF) (Master's thesis) (in Chinese). Graduate Institute of Taiwan History, National Taiwan Normal University.
- 旧李王家東京邸（赤坂プリンスクラシックハウス） [Former Yi royal family Tokyo residence: Akasaka Prince Classic House] (PDF). Chiyoda City (in Japanese). Chiyoda City. 30 March 2023.
- 旧李王家東京邸 [Former Yi royal family Tokyo residence]. Chiyoda City Cultural Properties Site (in Japanese). Chiyoda City. 27 August 2025.
- 영친왕, 신조선의 일시민으로서의 의무 다 하겠다고 기자회견 [Prince Yeongchin says in a press conference that he will fulfill his duty as a citizen of new Korea]. Chosun Ilbo (in Korean). 20 September 1946 – via National Institute of Korean History, Korean History Database.
- [모던 경성] 여왕과의 만찬, 피라미드 관광...영친왕의 호화판 유럽여행 [[Modern Gyeongseong] Dinner with a queen, pyramid sightseeing: Yi Un's lavish European trip]. Chosun Ilbo (in Korean). 9 July 2022.
- Cho, Sang-Woo (2020). 영친왕의 골프활동에 관한 연구 [The Study of Golf Activities of the King Young Chin]. Journal of the Korean Applied Science and Technology (in Korean). 37 (4): 986–995. ISSN 1225-9098.
- Choi, Ki-young (1995). 덕혜옹주 [Princess Deokhye]. Encyclopedia of Korean Culture (in Korean). Academy of Korean Studies.
- Choi, Eun-su (2025). 이해상 내외 상복 [Mourning clothes of Yi Hae-sang and his wife]. Encyclopedia of Korean Culture (in Korean). Academy of Korean Studies.
- 영친왕 환국 [Prince Yeongchin returns to Korea]. Daehan News (in Korean). National Film Production Center. 30 November 1963.
- 영친왕 서거 [Death of Prince Yeongchin]. Daehan News (in Korean). National Film Production Center. 15 May 1970.
- 虹を架ける王妃～朝鮮王朝最後の皇太子と方子妃の物語～ [The Princess Who Built a Rainbow: The Story of the Last Crown Prince of the Korean Dynasty and Princess Masako]. FOD (in Japanese). Fuji Television.
- Kim, Ju-sung (22 November 2021). [디비일보] 63년 11월22일 56년 만에 환국한 대한제국 마지막 황태자 영친왕 이은 [[DB Ilbo] On 22 November 1963, Yi Un, the last crown prince of the Korean Empire, returned after 56 years]. Hankook Ilbo (in Korean).
- Han, Hee-sook (2017). 순헌황귀비 [Imperial Noble Consort Sunheon]. Encyclopedia of Korean Culture (in Korean). Academy of Korean Studies.
- 旧高松宮 [Former Takamatsu-no-miya]. Imperial Household Agency (in Japanese).
- 王公族ノ服装ニ関スル皇室令案 [Draft Imperial Household Ordinance concerning the dress of the royal and princely families]. Japan Center for Asian Historical Records (in Japanese). National Archives of Japan. 1927.
- 王公族ノ権義ニ関スル法律 [Law concerning the rights and duties of the royal and princely families]. Japanese Historical Legal Code Database (in Japanese). Nagoya University. 1 December 1926.
- 不動産登記法中改正法律 [Act amending the Real Estate Registration Act]. Japanese Historical Legal Code Database (in Japanese). Nagoya University. 31 March 1927.
- 李王職官制 [Yi Royal Household Office Regulations]. Japan Legal Index (in Japanese). National Diet Library. 30 December 1910.
- 王公家軌範 [Regulations for the Royal and Princely Houses]. Japan Legal Index (in Japanese). National Diet Library. 1 December 1926.
- 王公世襲財産規則 [Regulations on royal and princely hereditary property]. Japan Legal Index (in Japanese). National Diet Library. 18 December 1926.
- 王公族ノ服装ニ関スル件 [Concerning the dress of the royal and princely families]. Japan Legal Index (in Japanese). National Diet Library. 19 January 1927.
- 皇室令及附属法令廃止ノ件 [Concerning the abolition of Imperial Household Ordinances and attached laws]. Japan Legal Index (in Japanese). National Diet Library. 2 May 1947.
- Kim, Christine (2010). "The Chosŏn Monarchy in Republican Korea, 1945–1965". In Kim, Mikyoung; Schwartz, Barry (eds.). Northeast Asia's Difficult Past: Essays in Collective Memory. Palgrave Macmillan Memory Studies. London: Palgrave Macmillan. pp. 213–228. doi:10.1057/9780230277427_10. ISBN 978-0-230-27742-7.
- Kim, Christine (2013). "Korean Royal Portraits in the Colonial Archives" (PDF). Ars Orientalis. 43: 96–107. ISSN 0571-1371.
- Kim, Jongsoo (2020). 구황실재산 관리 제도에 대한 연구 —구황실재산의 문화재관리체계 편입 관련— [Establishment of old imperial estate and cultural property management system: focused on inclusion of imperial estate as cultural property]. Korean Journal of Heritage: History and Science (in Korean). 53 (1): 64–87. doi:10.22755/kjchs.2020.53.1.64.
- 영친왕부부의 벨기에 브뤼셀 방문 [Visit of Prince Yeongchin and his wife to Brussels, Belgium]. Reuters (in Korean). Korean Contemporary History Film Archive. 1927.
- 덕수궁 석조전, '대한제국역사관'으로 새로 태어나다 [Deoksugung Seokjojeon reborn as the Korean Empire History Hall] (in Korean). Korea Heritage Service. 7 October 2014.
- 서울 영휘원과 숭인원 [Yeonghwiwon and Sunginwon, Seoul]. National Heritage Digital Service (in Korean). Korea Heritage Service.
- 每日申報 1918년 1월 15일 [Maeil Sinbo, 15 January 1918] (PDF). Maeil Sinbo (in Korean). 15 January 1918 – via Wikimedia Commons; National Digital Library of Korea.
- 영친왕장례절차확정 [Funeral procedures for Prince Yeongchin confirmed]. Maeil Business Newspaper (in Korean). 8 May 1970.
- 장송인파…만장속에묻힌「비운의생애」 [Crowds of mourners: a tragic life buried among mourning banners]. Maeil Business Newspaper (in Korean). 9 May 1970.
- 영친왕 리은씨 영면 [Prince Yeongchin Yi Un dies]. Maeil Business Newspaper (in Korean). 2 May 1970.
- 리은공의 일생 [The life of Prince Yi Un]. Maeil Business Newspaper (in Korean). 2 May 1970.
- "Nashimoto Morimasa". Portraits of Modern Japanese Historical Figures. National Diet Library.
- ツェッペリン来たる [The Zeppelin Comes]. Film is a Document: NFAJ Historic Film Portal (in Japanese). National Film Archive of Japan. 1929.
- 昭和七年二月十四日 李王殿下を奉迎して [Welcoming His Highness Yi Wang on 14 February 1932]. Film is a Document: NFAJ Historic Film Portal (in Japanese). National Film Archive of Japan. 1932.
- 이은을 황태자로 책봉하다 [Yi Un is appointed crown prince]. Veritable Records of the Joseon Dynasty (in Korean). National Institute of Korean History. 7 September 1907.
- 조선총독 데라우치 마사타케의 유고 [Proclamation of Governor-General Terauchi Masatake]. Korean History Database (in Korean). National Institute of Korean History. 29 August 1910.
- 한민족독립운동사 [History of the Korean National Independence Movement]. Korean History Database (in Korean). National Institute of Korean History.
- 궁내부 대신이 왕세자 은전하의 칭호를 창덕궁 이왕 은전하로 제정하였다는 칙령을 받다 [The palace minister receives an imperial order settling Crown Prince Un's style as Changdeokgung Yi Wang Un Jeonha]. Veritable Records of the Joseon Dynasty (in Korean). National Institute of Korean History. 26 April 1926.
- 순종이 영친왕과 영친왕비가 알현하였다고 하다 [Sunjong says that Prince Yeongchin and Princess Yeongchin paid respects]. Veritable Records of the Joseon Dynasty (in Korean). National Institute of Korean History. 3 March 1926.
- "Tokyo War Crimes Trial". The National WWII Museum.
- 이왕가예산관계문서철 [Yi royal-household budget records] (in Korean). National Archives of Korea. 2006.
- 영친왕 이은, 56년 만에 귀국 [Yi Un, Prince Yeongchin, returns after 56 years]. National Archives of Korea (in Korean). 22 November 2012.
- 영친왕 장례식 [Funeral of Prince Yeongchin]. eMuseum (in Korean). National Palace Museum of Korea.
- Pai, Hyung Il (2015). "Visualizing Seoul's Landscapes: Percival Lowell and the Cultural Biography of Ethnographic Images" (PDF). Visual Anthropology. 28 (4): 356–384. doi:10.1080/08949468.2015.1058581.
- Park, Maeng-su (1995). 이은 [Yi Un]. Encyclopedia of Korean Culture (in Korean). Academy of Korean Studies.
- "The Tokyo Trial". Peace Palace Library.
- "The Last Princess: Cast & Crew". Rotten Tomatoes.
- Kim, Mi-kyung (18 August 2006). 일본에 한류 입힌다 [Bringing Hallyu to Japan]. Seoul Shinmun (in Korean).
- Shin, Byeong-ju (26 December 2016). [신병주의 '왕으로 산다는 것'] (47) 조선 왕실의 마지막 사람들 [[Shin Byeong-ju's "Living as a king"] (47) The last people of the Joseon royal family]. Maeil Business Newspaper (in Korean).
- Shin, Myeong-ho (1998). 이왕직 [Yi Royal Household Office]. Encyclopedia of Korean Culture (in Korean). Academy of Korean Studies.
- Shin, Myung-ho (2015). 일제강점기 이왕가(李王家) 재산의 구성과 관리 - 기본재산(基本財産)을 중심으로 [A Study on the Composition and Management for the Royal Basic Property during the Japanese Colonial Period]. The Journal of Humanities and Social Sciences (in Korean). 16 (4): 165–189. doi:10.15818/ihss.2015.16.4.165.
- Shin, Myung-ho (2017). 일제강점기 이왕가(李王家)의 세습재산 [Hereditary Property for Joseon Royal Family During the Japanese Colonial Period]. The Journal of Humanities and Social Sciences (in Korean). 18 (1): 627–650. doi:10.15818/ihss.2017.18.1.627.
- Shinjo, Michihiko (May 2006). 李垠（英親王） - 梨本宮方子의 결혼문제와 왕족의 양면성: 정략결혼은 왜 필요했는가 [The marriage issue of Yi Un and Princess Masako of Nashimoto and the duality of the royal family: why was a political marriage necessary?] (PDF). Critical Review of History (in Korean). 75: 312–343.
- 新城道彦 (2015). 朝鮮王公族―帝国日本の準皇族 (in Japanese). Chuokoron-Shinsha. ISBN 978-4121023094.
- Sumino, Yukari (2022). 李方子の信念とそれを受け継いだ人物 [Yi Bangja's belief and the person who inherited it] (PDF). Seminar Annual Report (in Japanese). Kansai University: 28–31.
- Suzuki, Nobuko (6 July 2019). 千代田区のビル群にある90年前の旧宮邸の来歴 [The history of a 90-year-old former princely residence among Chiyoda's buildings]. Toyo Keizai Online (in Japanese).
- Terada, Ayumi (2025). Terada, Ayumi; Zhai, Zhenxiao (eds.). 臺灣蘭花百姿 山田壽雄所繪之臺灣蘭花 [One Hundred Images of Taiwanese Orchids] (in Chinese). University Museum, University of Tokyo; National Museum of History, Taiwan. pp. 185–187.
- 赤坂プリンス クラシックハウス [Akasaka Prince Classic House]. Tokyo Garden Terrace Kioicho (in Japanese).
- Uyama, Takuei (11 March 2019). なぜ日本人妃が朝鮮最後の王に嫁いだのか [Why a Japanese princess married Korea's last king]. President Woman Online (in Japanese).
- <이희용의 글로벌시대> 영친왕 정략결혼 100년 잔혹사 [The cruel 100-year history of Crown Prince Yi Un's arranged marriage]. Yonhap News Agency (in Korean). 26 July 2016.
- <새영화> 망국의 운명을 떠안은 마지막 황녀 '덕혜옹주' [New film: The last princess who bore the fate of a ruined country, The Last Princess]. Yonhap News Agency (in Korean). 27 July 2016.
- 덕수궁 석조전, 대한제국역사관으로 재탄생 [Deoksugung Seokjojeon reborn as the Korean Empire History Hall]. Yonhap News Agency (in Korean). 7 October 2014.
- [스페셜] “덕혜를 좀더 능동적인 인물로 만들고자 했다” [Special: “I wanted to make Deokhye a more active character”]. Cine21 (in Korean). 8 August 2016.
- Hatano, Sumio (2011). "The Sino-Japanese War and the Pacific War". Japan-China Joint History Research Report (PDF) (Report). Ministry of Foreign Affairs of Japan. pp. 168–177.
- 旧李王家東京邸 [Former Yi royal family Tokyo residence]. Chiyoda City Cultural Properties Site (in Japanese). Chiyoda City. 27 August 2025.
- 株式会社西武プロパティーズ; 株式会社日建設計 (31 March 2017). 東京都指定有形文化財（建造物）「旧李王家東京邸」保存改修工事について [On the conservation and renovation work of the Tokyo Metropolitan Tangible Cultural Property (Building), Former Yi royal family Tokyo residence] (PDF). 東京の文化財 (in Japanese). No. 122. Tokyo Metropolitan Board of Education. pp. 3–5.
- Ko, Seong-jun (2012). 旧李王家東京邸内の武石弘三郎作大理石浮彫について [Takeishi Kōzaburō's marble relief in the former residence of Lee Eun in Tokyo] (PDF). 新潟県立近代美術館研究紀要 (in Japanese) (11): 12–15, 30.
- 刑部芳則 (2017). 明治時代の勲章外交儀礼 (in Japanese). 明治聖徳記念学会紀要.
- Bille-Hansen, A. C.; Holck, Harald, eds. (1933). Statshaandbog for Kongeriget Danmark for Aaret 1933 (in Danish).
- Sveriges statskalender (in Swedish). 1931.
- "Československý řád Bílého lva" (PDF) (in Czech).
- 대한제국의 마지막 황태자, 영친왕 [The last crown prince of the Korean Empire, Prince Yeongchin]. KBS WORLD Korean (in Korean). Korean Broadcasting System. 15 May 2010.
- Lee, Hye Jin. "Yi Ku, the Last Prince of the Joseon Dynasty". Boston Korean Diaspora Project. Boston University School of Theology, Center for Global Christianity and Mission.
