= Avengers Social Club =

2017 South Korean television series

- Promotional poster
- Hangul: 부암동 복수자들
- Lit.: Buam-dong Avengers
- RR: Buam-dong boksujadeul
- MR: Puam-dong poksujadŭl
- Genre: Drama; Comedy; Friendship
- Based on: Buam-dong Boksuja Social Club by Sajatokki
- Developed by: Studio Dragon
- Written by: Kim Yi-ji; Sajatokki (original)
- Directed by: Kwon Seok-jang (1–4); Kim Sang-ho (5–12)
- Starring: Lee Yo-won; Ra Mi-ran; Myung Se-bin; Lee Jun-young
- Music by: Kang Min-guk
- Country of origin: South Korea
- Original language: Korean
- No. of episodes: 12

Production
- Executive producer: Lee Jin-suk
- Camera setup: Single-camera
- Running time: 60 minutes
- Production company: JS Pictures

Original release
- Network: tvN
- Release: October 11 – November 16, 2017

Avengers Social Club (Korean: 부암동 복수자들) is a 2017 South Korean television series starring Lee Yo-won, Ra Mi-ran, Myung Se-bin and Lee Jun-young. It is adapted from a webtoon titled Buam-dong Avengers Social Club which was serialized on Daum from 2014 to 2016. It aired on tvN from October 11, to November 16, 2017 every Wednesday and Thursday at 21:30 (KST).

== Synopsis ==
Features three women and one man from different walks of life coming together for revenge: a fish store ajumma who envisioned a better life for herself, a housewife who grew up an orphan, a chaebol magnate's daughter who was raised like a delicate flower and a young man who was neglected by his parents. They're an unlikely foursome who would never otherwise meet, but they join forces to carry out their individual revenges. Although they start out as co-conspirators, along the way they become close to one another.

== Cast ==
=== Main ===
- Lee Yo-won as Kim Jung-hye

Daughter of a family who runs a big company. She appears straightforward and arrogant, but she is actually naive and cute. Her marriage was made to benefit both families. She tries her best as a wife, but she learns that her husband has betrayed her. To get revenge, she leads the "Bok-ja Club".

- Ra Mi-ran as Hong Do-hee

Hong Do-hee sells fish at a traditional market and raises her two kids alone. Her husband died. She is bright and good natured. Her son gets involved in a violent incident at school.

- Myung Se-bin as Lee Mi-sook

She was an orphan and married. She has tried hard to have a happy family with her university professor husband, but he is violent towards her. She had a son and daughter, but her son Seo-jin died prior to the events of the drama, and her daughter Seo-yeon became estranged from her since. She begins to think about her life after she meets Kim Jung-hye and Hong Do-hee.

- Lee Jun-young as Lee Soo-gyum

He joins the "Bok-ja Club" to take revenge on his biological parents. His father is Kim Jung-hye's husband. Before he married Kim Jung-hye, he had a fling with a woman who gave birth to Lee Soo-gyum. His biological parents have neglected him since.

=== Supporting ===
Jung-hye's family

- Choi Byung-mo as Lee Byung-soo (husband)
- Jang Yong as Lee Jae-gook (father-in-law)
- Jung Ae-yun as Kim Jung-yoon (sister)

Do-hee's family

- Park Se-Mi as Kim Hee-kyung (daughter)
- Choi Kyu-jin as Kim Hee-soo (son)

Mi-sook's family

- Jung Suk-yong as Baek Young-pyo (husband)
- Kim Bo-ra as Baek Seo-yeon (daughter)
- Sung Byung-sook as mother-in-law

Soo-gyum's family

- Shin Dong-mi as Han Soo-ji (mother)

Others

- Shin Dong-woo as Hwang Jung-wook
- Yoo In-soo as Kyung-bok
- Jung Young-joo as Joo Gil-yun (Jung-wook's mother)
- Kim Hyung-il as Hong Sang-man, Principal of Buam-dong High School
- Kim Sa-kwon as Park Seung-woo
- So Hee-jung
- Jo Ah-in

Special appearance

- Jo Hee-bong as café's angry customer (ep. 2)

== Production ==
First script reading took place on August 17, 2017 at Studio Dragon in Sangam-dong, Seoul.

== Ratings ==
In this table, the blue numbers represent the lowest ratings and the red numbers represent the highest ratings.

Ep.	Original broadcast date	Average audience share		
Ep.	Original broadcast date	AGB Nielsen		TNmS
Ep.	Original broadcast date	Nationwide	Seoul	Nationwide
1	October 11, 2017	2.900%	2.999%	2.8%
2	October 12, 2017	4.636%	5.343%	4.9%
3	October 18, 2017	5.249%	5.717%	4.8%
4	October 19, 2017	5.054%	5.377%	5.5%
5	October 25, 2017	5.283%	5.538%	4.6%
6	October 26, 2017	5.087%	5.287%	4.8%
7	November 1, 2017	4.802%	5.348%	4.9%
8	November 2, 2017	4.925%	5.697%	5.5%
9	November 8, 2017	6.021%	6.386%	6.4%
10	November 9, 2017	6.126%	6.972%	6.4%
11	November 15, 2017	5.495%	5.846%	6.0%
12	November 16, 2017	6.330%	6.586%	6.1%
Average		5.159%	5.591%	5.2%

- This drama airs on a cable channel/pay TV which normally has a relatively smaller audience compared to free-to-air TV/public broadcasters (KBS, SBS, MBC and EBS).

== Awards and nominations ==
Name of the award ceremony, year presented, category, nominee of the award, and the result of the nomination
Award ceremony	Year	Category	Nominee / Work	Result	Ref.
Baeksang Arts Awards	2018	Best Supporting Actress – Television	Ra Mi-ran	Nominated	
