= Princess Deokhye =

Korean princess (1912–1989)

Princess Deokhye 덕혜옹주
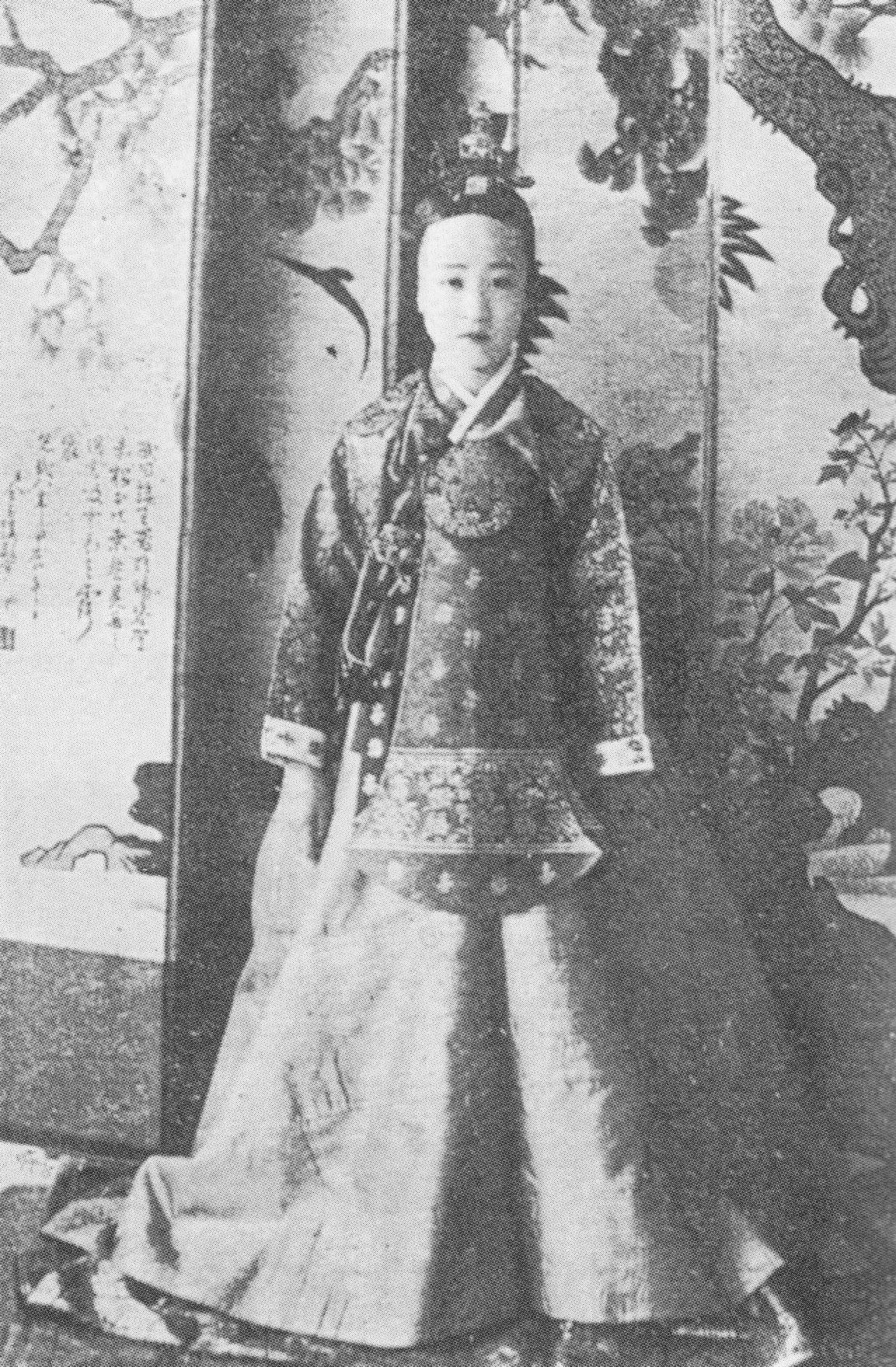
- 10-11 year old Princess Deokhye, ca. 1923
- Born: Yi Deokhye; 25 May 1912; Deoksu Palace, Keijo, Korea, Empire of Japan
- Died: 21 April 1989 (aged 76); Sugang Hall, Changdeok Palace, Seoul, South Korea
- Burial: Hongryureung, Namyangju, Gyeonggi Province, South Korea
- Spouse: Count Sō Takeyuki (m. 1931; div. 1955)
- Father: Gojong of Korea
- Mother: Imperial Consort Boknyeong Gwi-in

Korean name
- Hangul: 이덕혜
- Hanja: 李德惠
- RR: I Deokhye
- MR: I Tŏkhye

Royal title
- Hangul: 덕혜옹주
- Hanja: 德惠翁主
- RR: Deokhye ongju
- MR: Tŏkhye ongju

Princess Deokhye of Korea (Korean: 덕혜옹주; Japanese: 徳恵姫, Tokue-hime; 25 May 1912 – 21 April 1989) was the last princess of the Korean royal family.

She was born on 25 May 1912, at Changdeok Palace, in Seoul, as the youngest daughter of Emperor Gojong from his concubine, then known as Yang Gwi-in. After her birth, Gojong bestowed the royal title Boknyeong on Lady Yang.

Deokhye was not formally recognized as a princess by Japan because she was not the daughter of a Queen. In 1917, she was officially recognized as a princess by the Japanese government and her name was also formally entered into the imperial family's registry. Her father loved her greatly and established the Deoksugung Kindergarten for her in Junmyungdang (준명당), Hamnyeong Hall. Girls her age from noble families attended the kindergarten.

In South Korea, she is called Deokhye Ongju, not Gongju. Gongju refers to the daughters of the Queen, and Ongju refers to the daughters of concubines.

== Birth and early life ==
Yi Deokhye was born as the daughter of Yang Gwiin (later Lady Boknyeong) and the then-60-year-old Emperor Emeritus Gojong on 25 May 1912, nearly two years after the Japanese annexation of Korea. Immediately after birth, she was called Agi (Korean: 아기; Hanja: 阿只, meaning 'baby') and then named Deokhye. Her mother was a low-ranking court lady working in the kitchen of Deoksugung.

Gojong had 16 children with his 10 wives, but Deokhye was his first daughter; his four other daughters were not counted as they all died under the age of one. Gojong was delighted with the birth of his first daughter and raised her with meticulous love. In 1916, he established the Deoksugung Kindergarten dedicated to her, where Deokhye would attend. However, apart from her father, because she didn't have an official title, she was ignored and treated like she did not exist. Later, she was nicknamed "Boknyeong-dang".

In 1917, her father persuaded Terauchi Masatake, the then-ruling Governor-General of Korea, to enter her name into the registry of the imperial family, offering her legitimacy and granting her the title of princess.

In 1919, Emperor Gojong planned a secret engagement between Princess Deokhye and Kim Jang-han, the nephew of Kim Hwang-jin, a court chamberlain. He had sought to protect his daughter through it, but the engagement failed due to Japan's intervention and Kim Hwang-jin was not permitted to enter Deoksu Palace again. Emperor Gojong died suddenly on 21 January 1919.

In 1921, Princess Deokhye started going to Hinodae Elementary School, in Seoul.

== Life in Japan and arranged marriage ==
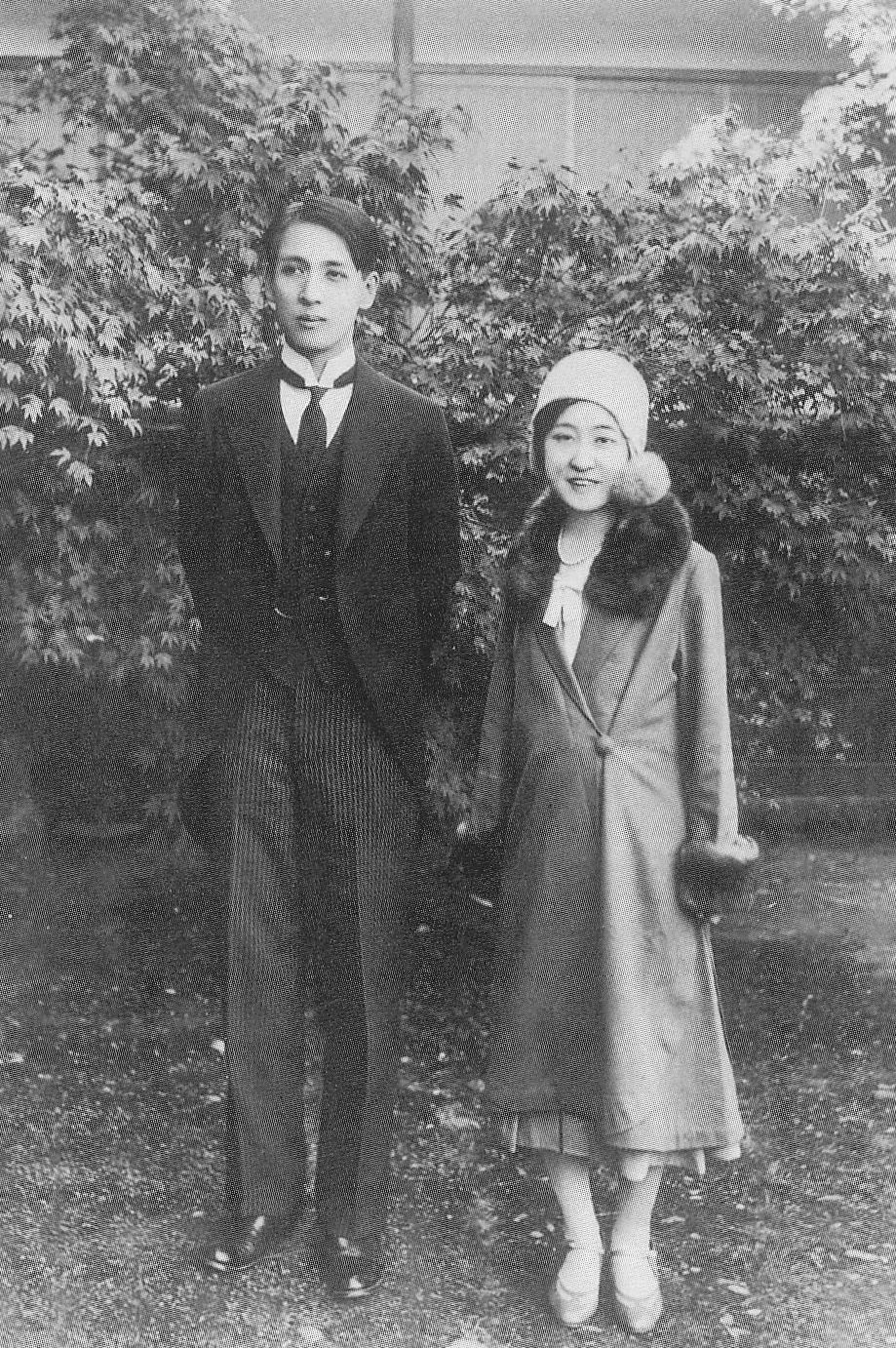
Sō Takeyuki and Deokhye (1931)

In 1925, the Princess was taken to Japan under the pretense of continuing her studies. Like her brothers, she attended the Gakushuin, where Yukika Sohma was among her schoolmates. In Japan, she was known as Princess Tokue (徳恵姫, Tokue-hime). According to Yukika, she was untalkative and struggled with exercising.

Upon the news of her mother's death in 1929, Deokhye was finally given permission to visit Korea temporarily, in order to attend the funeral. However, she was not allowed to wear the proper clothing.

By the spring of 1930, the Princess's mental health conditions deteriorated due to her hardships for years. Upon the onset of a psychological condition (manifested by sleepwalking), she moved to King Yi's Palace, the Tokyo house of her brother, Crown Prince Eun. During this period, she often forgot to eat and drink. Her physician diagnosed her illness as precocious dementia (today called schizophrenia), but by the following year, her condition seemed to have improved. This may be attributed to her traumatic experiences of forced separation from her family and significant duress she experienced under the colonial government.

In May 1931, the Princess was forced to enter an unwanted marriage set-up by Empress Teimei, the consort of Emperor Taishō of Japan. The man who willingly chose to marry her was Count Sō Takeyuki (宗 武志; 1908–1985), a Japanese aristocrat. The marriage had in fact been decided in 1930. Her brother had protested against it, and it had been postponed because of her condition, but when she recovered, she was immediately given instructions that the wedding was to take place.

She gave birth to a daughter, Masae (正惠), or Jeonghye (정혜) in Korea, on 14 August 1932. In 1933, Deokhye was again experiencing mental illness, and after this, she spent many years in various mental health clinics.

With the defeat of Japan in World War II, Korea once again became independent and her husband lost his noble title, as the Japanese peerage was abolished.

Her daughter, Masae, graduated from Waseda University's Department of Literature and met Suzuki Noboru, whom she married in 1955. Her son-in-law would eventually take on her husband's last name as the heir to the family.

In 1955, Takeyuki eventually divorced the Princess and later remarried to a Japanese woman named Yoshie Katsumura with whom he had three children.

Having suffered an unhappy marriage, Deokhye's grief was compounded by the loss of her only daughter, who disappeared on 26 August 1956 in Yamanashi-ken, reportedly committing suicide due to the stress of her parents' divorce. Her daughter's suicide note was found in the mountains. As a result, Deokhye's condition deteriorated at a slow yet considerable pace.

== Return to Korea and death ==
She returned to Korea at the invitation of the South Korean government on 26 January 1962, after 37 years. At first, the South Korean government refused to allow the return of the last royal bloodline, because President Rhee Syng-man wanted to avoid political chaos. However, reporter Kim Eul-han found the princess and persuaded the government to allow her return. She cried while approaching her motherland, and despite her mental state, accurately remembered the complex royal court etiquette and protocol.

The princess reunited with her kindergarten and elementary school classmate, Min Yong-ah (민용아; 閔龍兒), and her 72-year-old wet nurse, Byeon Bok-dong (변복동; 卞福童; 1890–?), when they went to pick her up at Gimpo Airport. After meeting her sister-in-law, Empress Sunjeonghyo, the second wife of her older half-brother Emperor Sunjong, she was admitted to Seoul National University Hospital later that day for surgery to remove a polyp in the uterus.

Having being born in Korea, the princess was able to restore her Korean citizenship and finalized her name, Yi Deok-hye, on 8 February 1962, and was soon discharged from the hospital as her condition was proven stable on 4 May 1964. In the fall of 1968, she lived in Nakseon Hall, Changdeok Palace, with Prince Uimin and Princess Masako, their son Prince Gu, his wife Julia Mullock, and Mrs. Byeon Bok-dong.

Sometime before her death, around ten years before, her ex-husband flew from Japan to South Korea to visit her and see how she was doing, but this visit was rejected by her family.

He begged Yi Gong-jae, a member of the family, to let him meet his ex-wife. But Yi said:

I can't forgive him for having an unwanted arranged marriage with King Gojong's daughter [a marriage that the head of the family or parental authority orders regardless of the person's will for their own benefit or purpose], eventually putting the princess in a psychiatric hospital and getting a divorce. The princess doesn't even have anything to talk about meeting him, and there's no reason for him to meet. If she met you, she would think of the past and make her condition worse. So, people like you are not allowed to visit at all, so please go back.

Her last years were filled with visits to different hospitals, but on 24 May 1983, she was admitted and stayed temporarily at Hallym University Hangang Sacred Heart Hospital due to her old age.

On 21 April 1989, the princess died at Sugang Hall, Changdeok Palace, and was buried at Hongryureung in Namyangju. Her burial site is near where her father, Emperor Gojong, and older half-brother, Emperor Sunjong, are buried.

== Family ==
- Father
  - Emperor Gojong of Korea (대한제국 고종; 8 September 1852 – 21 January 1919)
    - Grandmother - Grand Internal Princess Consort Sunmok of the Yeoheung Min clan (순목부대부인 민씨; 3 February 1818 – 8 January 1898)
    - Grandfather - Yi Ha-eung, Grand Internal Prince Heungseon (이하응 흥선대원군; 21 December 1820 – 22 February 1898)
- Mother
  - Yang Chun-gi, Imperial Consort Boknyeong Gwi-in of the Cheongju Yang clan (양춘기 복녕당 귀인 양씨; 27 September 1882 – 30 May 1929)
    - Grandfather - Yang Eon-hwan (양언환; 梁彦煥)
- Husband
  - Count Sō Takeyuki (宗武志 16 February 1908 – 22 April 1985)
    - Father-in-law - Sō Yoriyuki (宗和志) later, Kuroda Yoriyuki (黒田和志; 8 September 1851 – 21 January 1917)
    - Mother-in-law - Kuroda Reiko (黒 鏻子; 1857–1925)
- Daughter
  - Countess Sō Masae (宗正惠), or Jong Jeong-hye (종정혜; 14 August 1932 – 26 August 1956)
    - Son-in-law: Sō Noboru (5 September 1931–?) (宗昇)

== In popular culture ==
=== Film and television ===
- Portrayed by Son Ye-jin in the 2016 film The Last Princess.

=== Literature ===
- A biography of Princess Deokhye was published by Japanese author Yasuko Honma (本馬恭子) and was subsequently translated into Korean by Hoon Lee and published in 1996.
- The best-selling novel Princess Deokhye by Kwon Bi-young was published in 2009.

=== Music ===
- Singer Ho Shim-nam created a 1963 song based upon the life of Princess Deokhye.
- Korean singer Heo Jinsul's 2010 song "The Rose of Tears" (Korean: 눈물꽃; RR: Nun Mul Kkot) is based upon the life of Princess Deokhye, and was recorded in both English and Korean.

=== Theater ===
- In 1995, a play based upon Princess Deokhye was held at the Seoul Art Center.
- The 2013 Korean musical Deokhye, the Last Princess (Korean: 덕혜옹주; RR: Deokhye Ongju) is based upon her life.

== Ancestors ==
Ancestors of Princess Deokhye

Yi Byeong-won
Prince Namyeon
Lady Jeong
Grand Internal Prince Heungseon
Min Gyeong-hyeok
Princess Consort Min of the Yeoheung Min clan
Lady Han of the Cheongju Han clan
Emperor Gojong
Min Dan-hyeon
Min Chi-gu
Lady Park of the Miryang Park clan
Grand Internal Princess Sunmok of the Yeoheung Min clan
Yi Ok
Lady Yi of the Jeonju Yi clan
Lady Kim of the Andong Kim clan
Princess Deokhye of Korea
Yang Eon-hwan
Royal Consort Boknyeong Gwi-in of the Cheongju Yang clan

== See also ==
- History of Korea
- Rulers of Korea
