= Gwiin Yang =

Korean imperial consort (1882–1929)

- Noble Lady
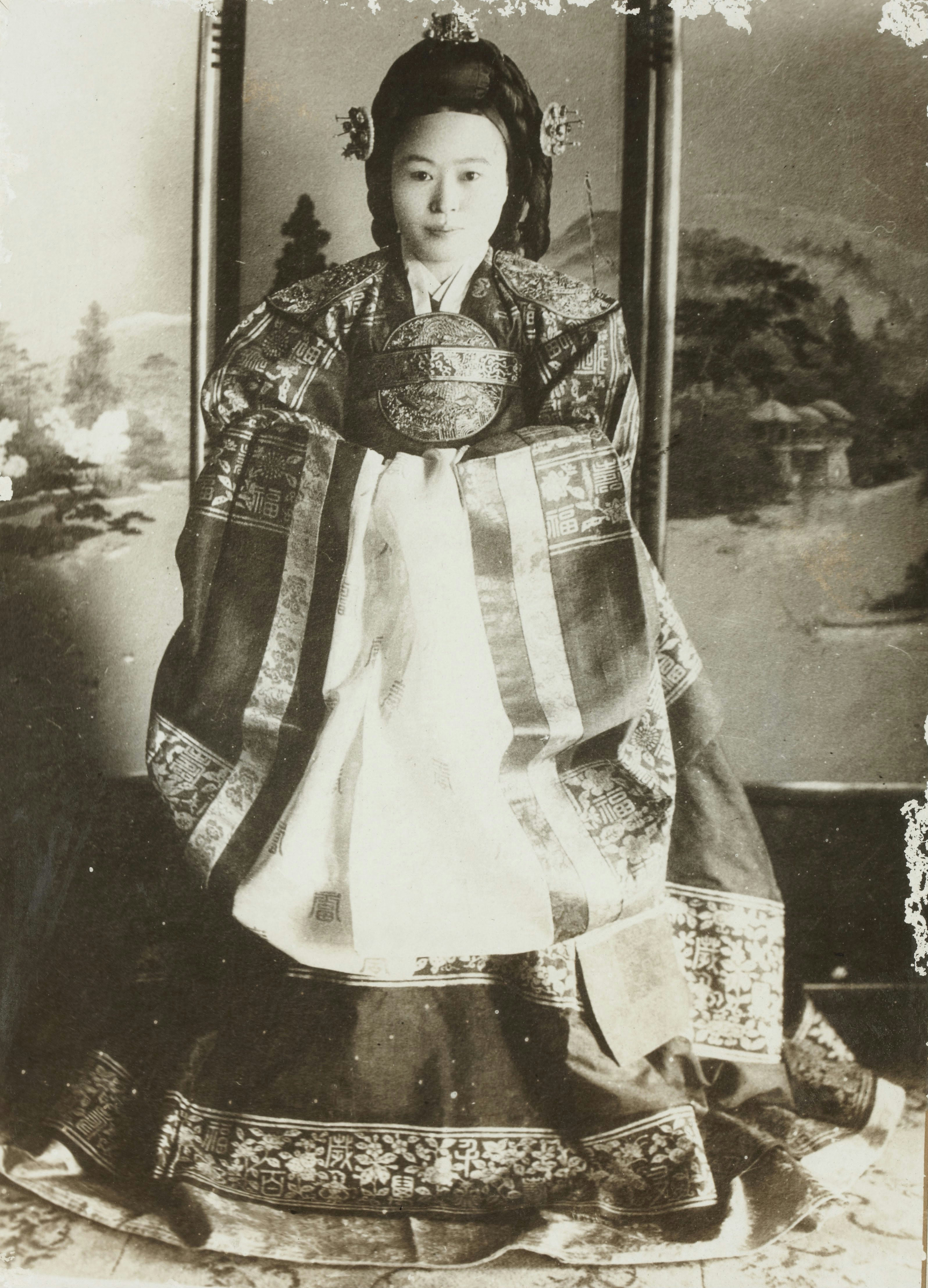
- Photograph in ceremonial attire, c. 1917
- Born: Yang Chun-gi (양춘기; 梁春基); 27 September 1882; Joseon
- Died: 30 May 1929 (aged 46); Keijō, Chōsen
- Burial: Seosamneung Cluster, Goyang, South Korea
- Consort of: Gojong of Korea
- Issue: Princess Deokhye
- Clan: Chungju Yang (by birth); Jeonju Yi (by marriage)
- Dynasty: Yi
- Father: Yang Eon-hwan

Korean name
- Hangul: 귀인 양씨
- Hanja: 貴人 梁氏
- RR: Gwiin Yangssi
- MR: Kwiin Yangssi

Gwiin Yang of Boknyeongdang Hall (복녕당 귀인 양씨; 福寧堂 貴人 梁氏; 27 September 1882 – 30 May 1929), of the Chungju Yang clan, personal name Yang Chun-gi, was a consort of Gojong of Korea and the biological mother of Princess Deokhye.

== Family ==
- Father: Yang Eon-hwan (양언환; 梁彦煥)
- Husband: Emperor Gojong of Korea (대한제국의 고종황제; 大韓帝國的 高宗皇帝; 8 September 1852 – 21 January 1919)
  - Princess Deokhye (덕혜옹주; 德惠翁主; 25 May 1912 – 21 April 1989), Gojong's fourth daughter
    - Son-in-law: Count Sō Takeyuki (소 다케유키; 宗 武志; 16 February 1908 – 22 April 1985) (Note: A Japanese nobleman of Tsushima. After the divorce in 1953, he remarried a Japanese woman, Katsumura Yoshie (가쓰무라 요시에; 勝村 良江), in 1955, and had three children (two sons and one daughter).)
      - Granddaughter: Countess Sō Masae (소 마사에; 宗 正惠; 14 August 1932 – 1956), or Sō Jeonghye (소 정혜)
        - Grandson-in-law: Sō Noboru (소 노보루; 宗 昇; 5 September 1931 – ?) (Note: He changed his last name "Suzuki" (스즈키; 鈴木) to "Sō" (소; 宗) after marriage.)
