= Sō Takeyuki =

Japanese count, poet

Count Sō Takeyuki
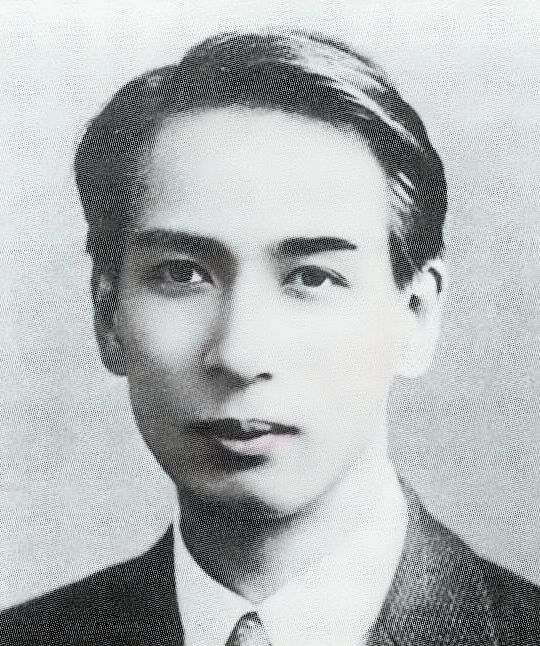
- Count Sō Takeyuki in 1931

37th Lord of the Sō clan
- In office October 1923 – 22 April 1985
- Preceded by: Sō Shigemochi
- Succeeded by: Sō Tatsuhito (as titular head)

Count of Tsushima
- In office October 1923 – 3 May 1947
- Preceded by: Sō Shigemochi
- Succeeded by: Position abolished

Member of the House of Peers
- In office 27 June 1946 – 2 May 1947
- Succeeded by: Position abolished

Personal details
- Born: 16 February 1908 Tokyo, Empire of Japan
- Died: 22 April 1985 (aged 77)
- Spouse(s): Princess Deokhye (m. 1930; div. 1953) Katsumura Yoshie (m. 1955)
- Children: Countess Sō Masae; Sō Tatsuhito; Sō Waki; Sō Nakamasa
- Parent(s): Kuroda Yoriyuki; Kuroda Reiko
- Education: University of Tokyo
- Occupation: Aristocrat, academic and poet

Count Sō Takeyuki (宗武志, Takeyuki Sō; Korean: 소 다케유키; 16 February 1908 – 22 April 1985) was a Japanese aristocrat, academic and poet. He was the count of the island Tsushima from 1923 to 1947. He was the husband of Princess Deokhye, the last princess of the Korean Empire, and served as a member of the House of Peers.

== Life ==
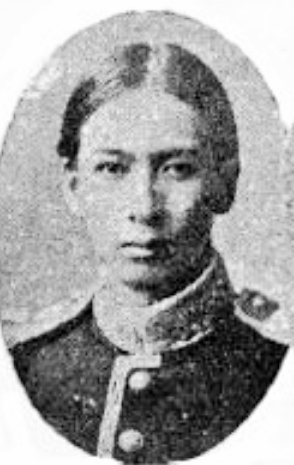
1931

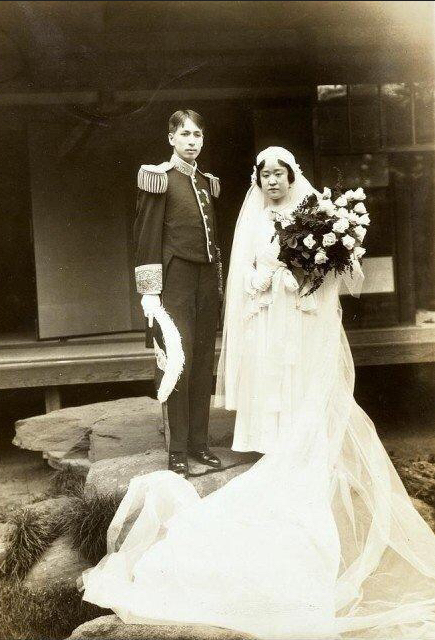
Takeyuki and his wife

Sō was born Kuroda Takeyuki (黒田 武志) on 16 February 1908 as the only son of aristocrat Kuroda Yoriyuki, a self-made lawmaker who was also the judge of the Nagasaki and Yokohama courts. His mother was Kuroda Reiko, the daughter of Kuroda Naoyasu, Lord of Kururi, Kazusa (now Chiba Prefecture). Originally, Kuroda was the sixth son of Yoshiyori, the Lord of Tsushima, but when his wife's father died without a son in 1884, he became the heir to the Kuroda family instead. Kuroda died of illness in 1917 when Takeyuki was eight years old.

After attending Yotsuya's first elementary school in Tokyo and Seibi school in Japan, Takeyuki moved to Tsushima. He entered Izuhara Elementary School in 1918 and Tsushima Junior High School in 1920. When his older cousin, Sō Shigemochi, leader of the Sō clan, died without a son in March 1923, Takeyuki succeeded as the next leader of the Sō clan in October.

After graduating from Tsushima Junior High School, Sō moved to Tokyo in 1925 and entered Gakushūin High School. That same year, his mother died, and as a result, he went under the care of Duke Gujo Michijanae (구조 미치자네, 九条道実).

In 1928, he entered the Department of English Literature at the University of Tokyo and graduated in 1939.

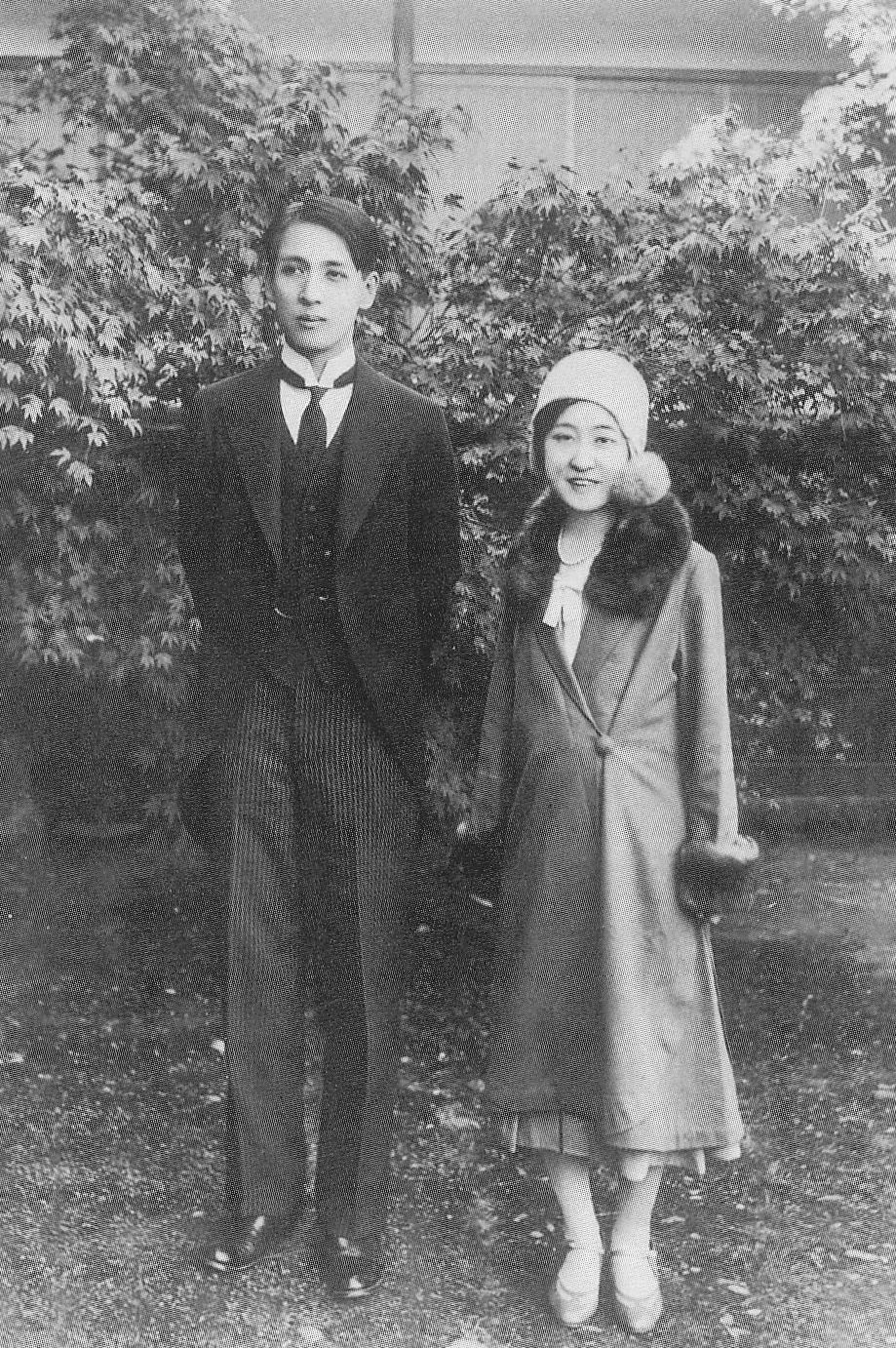
Takeyuki and Deokhye (1931) in Izuhara, Tsushima.

In 1930, he met Princess Deokhye for the first time at Gujo's mansion. In May 1931, after matchmaking that was performed by Empress Teimei, the consort of Emperor Taishō of Japan, he married Deokhye, who was the daughter of Emperor Gojong of Korea and his concubine, Imperial Consort Boknyeong Gwi-in. Sō and Deokhye had a daughter, Masae (正惠) (Jeonghye (정혜) in Korean), on 14 August 1932.

After the war, he was elected to the House of Peers in a by-election in June 1946. On 2 May 1947, he lost his position due to the enforcement of the Constitution of Japan.

When Japan was defeated in World War II, Korea once again became independent and lost its nobility title, as Kazoku was abolished. The arranged marriage no longer made sense, and Sō and Deokhye gradually became detached from one another until they divorced in 1953.

His daughter, Masae, graduated from Waseda University's Department of Literature and met Suzuki Noboru, whom she married in 1955. Having suffered an unhappy marriage, Deokhye's grief was compounded by the loss of their only daughter who disappeared in 1956, who reportedly committed suicide due to the stress of her parents' divorce.

After the divorce, Takeyuki moved to Kashiwa, Chiba Prefecture, and remarried in 1955 to a Japanese woman named Katsumura Yoshie and had three children, the eldest being Tatsuhito, who succeeded him as titular head of the So family and Count of Tsushima titles.

Takeyuki Sō died on 22 April 1985 at the age of 77.

== Academic career ==
In 1932, Sō participated in the moral science class of Chikuro Hiroike. In 1935, at the time of the School of Moral Science's establishment, he was invited by Hiroike to become a lecturer and was in charge of moral science lectures.

In 1936, Sō took charge of English in the main course of the Department of Moral Sciences before resigning as a lecturer in 1940. After that, he studied subjects like English conversation, composition, Latin, Greek, and Italian at home.

In 1944, he became a part-time director of the Cabinet Information Bureau and engaged in English–Japanese translation in the Second Section of the War Materials Room of the President's Secretariat. In July 1945, he was summoned as a second-class soldier and joined the Army's Independent 37th Battalion, transferred to the 83rd Kashiwa Unit.

After 1945, Sō served as a professor and dean of the Faculty of Foreign Studies at Reitaku University, becoming an emeritus professor in 1978. In 1963, he became a trustee of Hiroike Gakuen and a director of the Institute of Moral Science. In 1970, he became executive director of Hiroike Gakuen. Throughout his life, he worked on poetry and painting, and in 1975 he presided over the poetry magazine Shida.

== Works ==
- 『対馬民謡集』第一書房、1934年
- 『海郷』第二書房、1956年
- 『紀行110日』廣池学園出版部、1964年
- 『春庭楽（しゅんだいらく）』廣池学園事業部、1978年
- 『日の雫』沙羅詩社、1978年
- 『黒潮─宗武志歌集』私家版、1985年

== Family ==
- Grandfather
  - Sō Yoshiyori (소 요시요리, 宗義和)
- Father
  - Sō Yoriyuki (소 요리유키) later, Kuroda Yoriyuki (구로다 요리유키, 黒田和志) (8 September 1851 – 21 January 1917)
    - Uncle – Sō Yoshiakira (소 요시아키라, 宗 義達 そう よしあきら) (13 December 1847 – 25 May 1902)
      - Cousin/adoptive father – Sō Shigyemochi (시게모치, 宗 重望)
  - Guardian – Gujo Michijanae (구조 미치자네, 九条道実) (16 January 1870 – 19 January 1933)
- Mother
  - Kuroda Reiko (구로다 레이코, 黒 鏻子) (? – 1925)
    - Grandfather – Kuroda Naoyasu (구로다 나오야스, 黒田直和) (11 August 1819 – 9 January 1876)
    - Grandmother – Ota Sukemoto (오타 스케모토, 太田資始)
- Wives and their children
  - Princess Deokhye (덕혜옹주) (25 May 1912 – 21 April 1989)
    - Daughter – Countess Sō Masae (소 마사에, 宗 正惠), or Sō Jeonghye (소 정혜) (14 August 1932 – 1956)
      - Son-in-law – Suzuki Noboru (스즈키 노보루, 鈴木 昇) later, Sō Noboru (소 노보루, 宗 昇) (5 September 1931 – ?)
  - Katsumura Yoshie (가쓰무라 요시에, 勝村 良江) later, Sō Yoshie (소 요시에, 宗 良江)
    - Son – Sō Tatsuhito (소 다쓰히토, 宗 立人)
    - Daughter – Sō Waki (소 와키, 宗 和木)
    - Son – Sō Nakamasa (소 나카마사, 宗 中正)

== In popular culture ==
=== Film and television ===
- Portrayed by Kim Jae-wook in the 2016 film The Last Princess.
