= Kuroda Yoriyuki =

Japanese politician and judge (1851–1917)

Viscount Kuroda Yoriyuki
- 黒田 和志
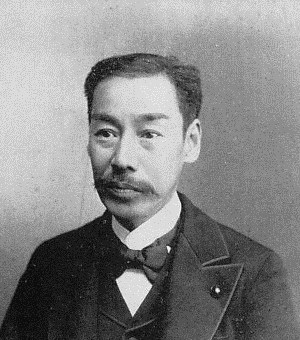

Member of the House of Peers
- In office 10 July 1897 – 21 January 1917 Elected by the Viscounts

Personal details
- Born: 8 September 1851
- Died: 21 January 1917 (aged 65) Yotsuya, Tokyo, Japan
- Children: Sō Takeyuki
- Parent: Sō Yoshiyori (father)

Kuroda Yoriyuki (黒田 和志, Kuroda Yoriyuki; 8 September 1851 – 21 January 1917) was a Japanese aristocrat and politician who was also the judge of the Nagasaki and Yokohama courts. He has served as a member of the House of Peers.

== Biography ==
Kuroda Yoriyuki was born on 8 September 1851 as the sixth son of Sō Yoshiyori, the Lord of Tsushima. On 14 April 1881, he married Kuroda Reiko, the daughter of Kuroda Naoyasu, Lord of Kururi, Kazusa (now Chiba Prefecture). When his wife's father died with no son in 1884, Yoriyuki became the heir to the Kuroda clan on 8 July 1884.

In May 1882, he was appointed the secretary of the National Court of Education. He subsequently served as assistant judge of the Sendai Court of Appeal, secretary of the Nagasaki Court of Appeal, secretary of the Yokohama District Court, and notary public of the Yokohama Ward Court.

In July 1897, he was elected to the House of Peers and remained in office until his death. Due to the merits of the Russo-Japanese War, he was awarded the Order of the Rising Sun by the Japanese government.

His fourth son, Count Sō Takeyuki married to Princess Deokhye, the daughter of Emperor Gojong of Korea.

On 21 January 1917, he died of illness at his home in Yotsuya, Tokyo.
