= Kang Ha-neul filmography =

List of Kang Ha-neul performances

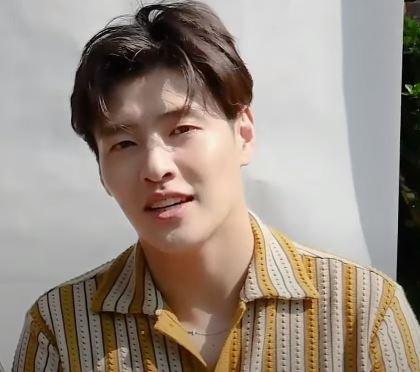
- Kang in 2021
- Film: 22
- Television series: 22
- Television show: 3
- Web show: 1
- Music videos: 2

Kim Ha-neul (Korean: 김하늘; February 21, 1990), known professionally as Kang Ha-neul (Korean: 강하늘), is a South Korean actor of stage and screen.

== Film ==
Year	Title	Role	Notes	Ref.
2011	Battlefield Heroes	Yeon Namsan		
2011	You're My Pet	Young-soo		
2014	Mourning Grave	Kang In-su		
2015	C'est Si Bon	Yoon Hyung-joo		
2015	Empire of Lust	Kim Jin		
2015	Twenty	Kyung-jae		
2016	Dongju: The Portrait of a Poet	Yun Dong-ju		
2016	Like for Likes	Lee Soo-ho		
2017	New Trial	Jo Hyun-woo		
2017	Midnight Runners	Kang Hee-yeol		
2017	Forgotten	Jin-seok		
2018	Heung-boo: The Revolutionist	Park Dol-po	Cameo	
2018	I Have a Date with Spring	Lee Gwi-dong	Cameo	
2021	Waiting for Rain	Park Young-ho		
2021	A Year-End Medley	Jae-yong		
2022	The Pirates: The Last Royal Treasure	Woo Moo-chi		
2023	Dream	Sung-chan	Cameo	
2023	Love Reset	Noh Jeong-yeol		
2024	Pilot	Undercover Police	Cameo	
2025	Streaming	Woo Sang		
2025	Yadang: The Snitch	Lee Kang-soo		
2025	Wall to Wall	Noh Woo-sung		
2025	The First Ride	Jung Tae-jung		

== Television series ==
Year	Title	Role	Notes	Ref.
2007	My Mom! Super Mom!	Choi Hoon		
2007–2012	Hometown Over the Hill	Kim Jong-hwi		
2011	Midnight Hospital	Yang Chang-soo		
2012	To the Beautiful You	Min Hyun-jae		
2013	Monstar	Jung Sun-woo		
2013	Two Weeks	Kim Sung-joon	Cameo	
2013	Unrest	Joon-kyung	KBS Drama Special	
2013	The Heirs	Lee Hyo-shin		
2014	Angel Eyes	young Park Dong-joo		
2014	You Are My Destiny	Advertisement model	Cameo (episode 17)	
2014	Misaeng: Incomplete Life	Jang Baek-gi		
2014–2015	Punch	Ma Jseon-nam	Cameo (episode 6)	
2015	The Missing	Lee Jung-soo	Cameo (episode 1–2)	
2016	Moon Lovers: Scarlet Heart Ryeo	8th Prince Wang Wook		
2016	Entourage	Himself	Cameo (episode 5)	
2019	When the Camellia Blooms	Hwang Yong-sik		
2021	River Where the Moon Rises	General On Hyeop	Cameo (episode 1–2, 23)	
2022	Insider	Kim Yo-han		
2022	Curtain Call	Yoo Jae-heon / Ri Jung-moon		
2023	The Kidnapping Day	Richard Choi	Cameo (episode 12)	
2024–2025	Squid Game	Kang Dae-ho (Player 388)	Season 2–3	
2025	Tastefully Yours	Han Beom-woo		

== Television shows ==
Year	Title	Role	Notes	Ref.
2016	Youth Over Flowers	Cast Member		
2020	Traveler	Cast Member	Season 2	
2021	House on Wheels: For Rent	Cast Member	With the cast of The Pirates: The Last Royal Treasure	

== Web shows ==
Year	Title	Role	Notes	Ref.
2022	Saturday Night Live Korea	Host	Season 2 – Episode 4	

== Music video appearances ==
Year	Song title	Artist	Ref.
2007	"Still Pretty Today"	Fly to the Sky	
2017	"Lost One"	Epik High	
