= List of awards and nominations received by Kang Ha-neul =

Kang Ha-neul awards and nominations
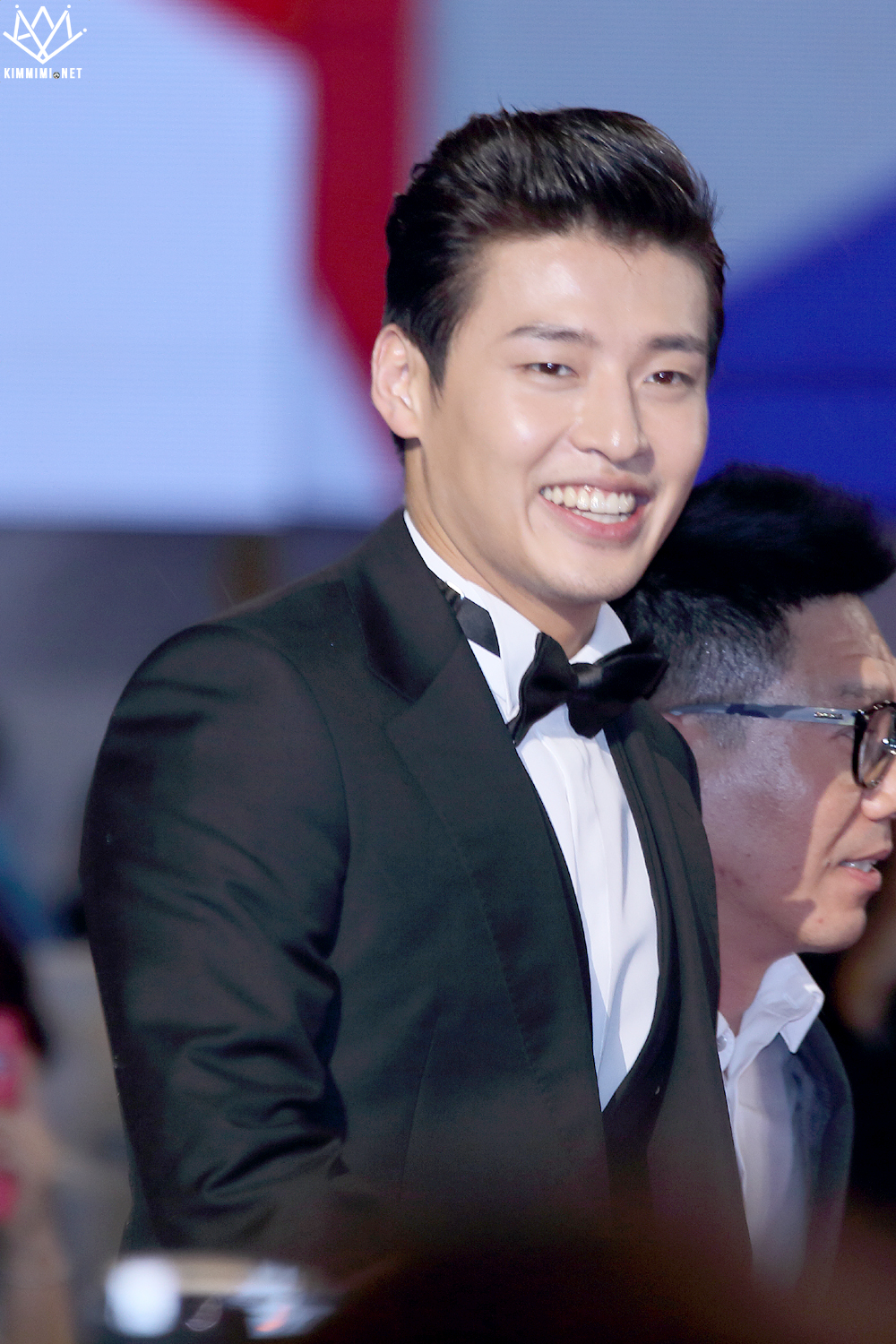
- Kang in 2015
Awards and nominations
Award	Wins	Nominations
APAN Star Awards	1	3
Asia Artist Awards	1	1
Asia Contents Awards	0	1
Baeksang Art Awards	1	2
Blue Dragon Film Awards	0	1
Buil Film Awards	0	1
Cable TV Broadcasting Awards	1	1
Cine Icon	1	1
Golden Cinematography Awards	1	1
Chunsa Film Art Awards	1	0
Grand Bell Awards	0	1
KBS Drama Awards	6	8
Korea Drama Awards	1	1
Korea First Brand Awards	1	1
Korea World Youth Film Festival	1	1
SBS Drama Awards	2	2
Star Night	1	1
Seoul International Drama Awards	1	2
Seoul International Youth Film Festival	0	1
TvN10 Awards	0	1
Wildflower Film Awards	1	1
Yegreen Musical Awards	1	1

Totals (Note: Certain award groups do not simply award one winner. They acknowledge several different recipients, have runners-up, and have third place. Since this is a specific recognition and is different from losing an award, runner-up mentions are considered wins in this award tally. For simplification and to avoid errors, each award in this list has been presumed to have had a prior nomination.)
- Wins: 22
- Nominations: 38

South Korean actor Kang Ha-neul has been recognized with numerous awards and nominations across his career in film, television, and theatre. His work earned him critical recognition, including a Chunsa Film Art Award for Best New Actor and a Golden Cinematography Award for Best New Actor, both for his performance in Lee Byeong-heon's film Twenty (2015). In the domain of film, his status was officially recognized in 2021 when the Korean Film Council included him on its "Korean Actor 200" list, which aims to introduce the most prominent South Korean actors to the global film industry.

He later secured a Baeksang Arts Award for Best Actor – Television for his leading role in the KBS2 drama When the Camellia Blooms (2019). This performance also led to him being ranked second in the year-end Gallup Korea's Actor of the Year survey and included in the 2019 Forbes Korea Power Celebrity 40 list.

In television, his achievements span multiple major network awards. He has earned two SBS Drama Awards for his roles in Angel Eyes (2014) and Moon Lovers: Scarlet Heart Ryeo (2016). Furthermore, he has amassed six wins at the KBS Drama Awards for his work on When the Camellia Blooms (2019) and Curtain Call (2022). In recognition of his contributions to the network, KBS included Kang in its 2023 list of "The 50 people who made KBS shine."

Kang has received commendations from the South Korean government for his cultural and public contributions. In 2020, he was awarded a Prime Minister Commendation at the Korean Popular Culture and Arts Awards. This was followed in 2024 by a Presidential Commendation at the 58th Taxpayers' Day ceremony.

== Awards and nominations ==
Name of the award ceremony, year presented, category, nominee of the award, and the result of the nomination
Award ceremony	Year	Category	Nominee / Work	Result	Ref.
APAN Star Awards	2016	Best New Actor	Misaeng: Incomplete Life	Nominated	
APAN Star Awards	2021	Top Excellence Award, Actor in a Miniseries	When the Camellia Blooms	Won	
APAN Star Awards	2021	Popular Star Award, Actor	When the Camellia Blooms	Nominated	
Asia Artist Awards	2016	Best Star Award, Actor	Moon Lovers: Scarlet Heart Ryeo	Nominated	
Asia Contents Awards	2020	Best Actor	When the Camellia Blooms	Nominated	
Baeksang Arts Awards	2015	Best New Actor – Film	Twenty	Nominated	
Baeksang Arts Awards	2020	Best Actor – Television	When the Camellia Blooms	Won	
Brand Customer Loyalty Awards	2020	Male Actor Drama Category	When the Camellia Blooms	Won	
Blue Dragon Film Awards	2015	Best New Actor	Twenty	Nominated	
Buil Film Awards	2016	Best Actor	Dongju: The Portrait of a Poet	Nominated	
Cable TV Broadcasting Awards	2015	Star Award - Actor	Misaeng: Incomplete Life	Won	
Chunsa Film Art Awards	2016	Best New Actor	Twenty	Won	
CINE ICON: KT&G Sangsangmadan Exhibition	2016	CINE ICON	Dongju: The Portrait of a Poet	Won	
Golden Cinematography Awards	2015	Newcomer Award	Twenty	Won	
Grand Bell Awards	2015	Best New Actor	Twenty	Nominated	
KBS Drama Awards	2019	Top Excellence Award, Actor	When the Camellia Blooms	Won	
KBS Drama Awards	2019	Excellence Award, Actor in a Mid-length Drama	When the Camellia Blooms	Nominated	
KBS Drama Awards	2019	Netizen Award	When the Camellia Blooms	Won	
KBS Drama Awards	2019	Best Couple Award	Kang Ha-neul with Gong Hyo-jin; When the Camellia Blooms	Won	
KBS Drama Awards	2022	Top Excellence Award, Actor	Curtain Call	Won	
KBS Drama Awards	2022	Excellence Award, Actor in a Miniseries	Curtain Call	Nominated	
KBS Drama Awards	2022	Popularity Award, Actor	Curtain Call	Won	
KBS Drama Awards	2022	Best Couple Award	Kang Ha-neul with Ha Ji-won; Curtain Call	Won	
Korea Broadcasting Awards	2020	Actor Award	When the Camellia Blooms	Won	
Star Night - Korea Top Star Awards Ceremony	2015	Best New Actor	Twenty	Won	
Korea Drama Awards	2025	Top Excellence Award, Actor	Tastefully Yours / Squid Game 2	Nominated	
Korean Film Producers Association Awards	2023	Best Actor	Love Reset	Won	
Korea First Brand Awards	2019	Best Actor	When the Camellia Blooms	Won	
Korea World Youth Film Festival	2015	Favorite New Actor	Twenty	Won	
MTN Broadcast Advertisement Festival	2016	CF Star Award	Kang Ha-neul	Won	
SBS Drama Awards	2014	New Star Award	Angel Eyes	Won	
SBS Drama Awards	2016	Excellence Award, Actor in a Fantasy Drama	Moon Lovers: Scarlet Heart Ryeo	Won	
Seoul International Drama Awards	2020	Best Actor	When the Camellia Blooms	Nominated	
Seoul International Drama Awards	2020	Outstanding Korean Actor	When the Camellia Blooms	Won	
Seoul International Youth Film Festival	2014	Best Young Actor	The Heirs, Angel Eyes	Nominated	
tvN10 Awards	2016	Scene Stealer, Actor	Misaeng: Incomplete Life	Nominated	
Wildflower Film Awards	2017	Best Actor	Dongju: The Portrait of a Poet	Nominated	
Yegreen Musical Award	2018	Best Actor	Shinheung Military Academy	Nominated	

== Other accolades ==
=== State honors ===
Name of country and award ceremony, year given, and name of honor
Country	Award ceremony	Year	Honor or Award	Ref.
South Korea	Korean Popular Culture and Arts Awards (Note: Honors are given at the Korean Popular Culture and Arts Awards, arranged by the Korea Creative Content Agency and hosted by the Ministry of Culture, Sports and Tourism. They are awarded to those who have contributed to the arts and South Korea's pop culture.)	2020	Prime Minister Commendation	
South Korea	Taxpayers' Day (Note: The National Tax Service (NTS) has a tradition of awarding the honorary title of "model taxpayer" to individuals and corporations who have faithfully paid their taxes and hence are seen as having contributed to society. Every Taxpayers' Day, on March 3, two celebrities are selected to be honorary goodwill ambassadors.)	2024	Presidential Commendation	

=== Listicles ===
Name of publisher, year listed, name of listicle, and placement
Publisher	Year	Listicle	Placement	Ref.
Cine21	2024	"Korean Film NEXT 50" – Actors	Included	
Forbes	2020	Korea Power Celebrity 40	23rd	
Gallup Korea	2019	Gallup Korea's Actor of the Year	2nd	
Gallup Korea	2024	Best Television Couple of the Past Decade (Note: With Gong Hyo-jin for When the Camellia Blooms (2019))	7th	
KBS	2023	The 50 people who made KBS shine	2nd	
Korean Film Council	2021	Korean Actors 200 (Note: The list introduces the 200 actors that best represent the present and future of Korean cinema to the people in the film industry all over the world.)	Included	
The Screen	2019	2009–2019 Top Box Office Powerhouse Actors in Korean Movies	50th	

== See also ==
- Kang Ha-neul discography
- Kang Ha-neul filmography
- Kang Ha-neul theater
