= List of South Korean films of 2025 =

The following is a list of South Korean films released in 2025.

== Box office ==
The highest-grossing South Korean films released in 2025, by domestic box office gross revenue, are as follows:

Highest-grossing films released in 2025
Rank	Title	Distributor	Domestic gross
1	My Daughter Is a Zombie	Next Entertainment World	$36,720,735
2	Yadang: The Snitch	Megabox Plus M	$22,117,601
3	No Other Choice	CJ Entertainment	$19,881,918
4	Once We Were Us	Showbox	$17,758,350
5	Hitman 2	By4M Studio	$16,575,441
6	Boss	Mindmark	$16,166,214
7	The Match	By4M Studio	$13,852,771
8	Hi-Five	Next Entertainment World	$12,125,724
9	Noise	By4M Studio	$11,606,688
10	Dark Nuns	Next Entertainment World	$11,174,146

== Released ==
=== January–March ===
Opening		English title	Native title	Director(s)	Cast	Ref.
J A N U A R Y	8	Forbidden Fairytale	동화지만 청불입니다	Lee Jong-seok	Park Ji-hyun, Choi Si-won, Sung Dong-il	
J A N U A R Y	8	Cornell's Box	코넬의 상자	Lee Hyun-ji	Dong Ha, Kim Su-min, Heo Ji-won	
J A N U A R Y	15	Crypto Man	폭락	Haeri Hyun	Song Jae-rim, Ahn Woo-yeon, So Hee-jung	
J A N U A R Y	15	Silver Apricot	은빛살구	Jang Man-min	Na Ae-jin, Ahn Suk-hwan, Kang Bong-sung, Kim Jin-young	
J A N U A R Y	15	Persona a strange girl	페르소나 이상한 여자	Jung Hyung-suk	Park Ho-san, Jeon Hye-yeon, Bang Eun-hee, Jung Hyung-suk, Kim Mun-hee	
J A N U A R Y	22	Hitman 2	히트맨 2	Choi Won-sub	Kwon Sang-woo, Jung Joon-ho, Lee Yi-kyung, Hwang Woo-seul-hye, Kim Sung-oh, Lee Ji-won	
J A N U A R Y	22	Moon's walking	문워크	Shin Hyun-kyu	Yoo Seung-mok, Hwang Ji-ah, Kim Min-kyung, Song Dong-hwan, Kim Gook-hee	
J A N U A R Y	24	Dark Nuns	검은 수녀들	Kwon Hyeok-jae	Song Hye-kyo, Jeon Yeo-been, Lee Jin-wook, Moon Woo-jin	
J A N U A R Y	24	Thunderstruck Cop	귀신경찰	Kim Young-joon	Shin Hyun-joon, Kim Soo-mi, Jung Joon-ho	
J A N U A R Y	27	Secret: Untold Melody	말할 수 없는 비밀	Seo Yoo-min	Doh Kyung-soo, Won Jin-ah, Shin Ye-eun	
F E B R U A R Y	5	Nocturnal	브로큰	Kim Jin-hwang	Ha Jung-woo, Kim Nam-gil, Yoo Da-in, Jung Man-sik	
F E B R U A R Y	21	Exorcism Chronicles: The Beginning	퇴마록	Kim Dong-cheol	Choi Han, Nam Doh-hyeong, Jung Yoo-jung, Kim Yeon-woo	
F E B R U A R Y	21	You Are the Apple of My Eye	그 시절, 우리가 좋아했던 소녀	Cho Young-myung	Jung Jin-young, Dahyun	
F E B R U A R Y	26	It's Okay!	괜찮아 괜찮아 괜찮아!	Kim Hye-young	Lee Re, Jin Seo-yeon, Jung Soo-bin, Lee Jung-ha, Son Suk-ku	
F E B R U A R Y	26	I Would Rather Kill You	차라리 죽여	Kim Sang-hoon	Kim Ju Eun, Kim Do-yeon, Ahn Jung-gyun	
F E B R U A R Y	26	The Noisy Mansion	백수아파트	Lee Ru-da	Kyung Soo-jin, Ko Kyu-pil, Lee Ji-hoon, Kim Joo-ryoung, Choi Yoo-jung	
F E B R U A R Y	28	Mickey 17		Bong Joon-ho	Robert Pattinson, Naomi Ackie, Steven Yeun, Toni Collette, Mark Ruffalo	
M A R C H	12	Somebody	침범	Kim Yeo-jeong, Lee Jeong-chan	Kwak Sun-young, Kwon Yu-ri, Lee Seol	
M A R C H	21	Revelations	계시록	Yeon Sang-ho	Ryu Jun-yeol, Shin Hyun-been	
M A R C H	21	Streaming	스트리밍	Cho Jang-ho	Kang Ha-neul	
M A R C H	26	The Match	승부	Kim Hyung-joo	Lee Byung-hun, Yoo Ah-in, Ko Chang-seok, Hyun Bong-sik, Moon Jeong-hee, Kim Kang-hoon	

=== April–June ===
Opening		English title	Native title	Director(s)	Cast	Ref.
A P R I L	2	Lobby	로비	Ha Jung-woo	Ha Jung-woo, Kim Eui-sung, Lee Dong-hwi, Park Byung-eun, Kang Mal-geum, Choi Si-won, Cha Joo-young, Park Hae-soo, Kwak Sun-young	
A P R I L	9	Paran	파란	Kang Dong-in	Lee Soo-hyuk, Ha Yoon-kyung	
A P R I L	16	Yadang: The Snitch	야당	Hwang Byeong-guk	Kang Ha-neul, Yoo Hae-jin, Park Hae-joon, Ryu Kyung-soo, Chae Won-bin	
A P R I L	30	Holy Night: Demon Hunters	거룩한 밤: 데몬 헌터스	Lim Dae-hee	Ma Dong-seok, Seohyun, Lee David, Kyung Soo-jin, Jung Ji-so	
A P R I L	30	The Old Woman with the Knife	파과	Min Kyu-dong	Lee Hye-young, Kim Sung-cheol	
M A Y	7	Virus	바이러스	Kang Yi-kwan	Bae Doona, Kim Yoon-seok, Chang Kiha, Son Suk-ku	
M A Y	14	What Does That Nature Say to You	그 자연이 네게 뭐라고 하니	Hong Sang-soo	Ha Seong-guk, Kwon Hae-hyo, Cho Yun-hee, Kang So-yi, Park Mi-so	
M A Y	21	No Parking	주차금지	Son Hyun-woo	Ryu Hyun-kyung, Kim Roi-ha, Cha Sun-woo	
M A Y	30	Big Deal	소주전쟁	Choi Yun-jin	Yoo Hae-jin, Lee Je-hoon, Son Hyun-joo, Choi Young-joon	
M A Y	30	Hi-Five	하이파이브	Kang Hyeong-cheol	Lee Jae-in, Ahn Jae-hong, Ra Mi-ran, Kim Hee-won, Yoo Ah-in, Oh Jung-se, Park Jin-young	
M A Y	30	Lost in Starlight	이 별에 필요한	Han Ji-won	Kim Tae-ri, Hong Kyung	
J U N E	2	The Pact	신명	Kim Nam-gyun	Kim Gyu-ri, Ahn Nae-sang	
J U N E	11	Midnight Sun	태양의 노래	Cho Young-jun	Jung Ji-so, Cha Hak-yeon	
J U N E	25	Noise	노이즈	Kim Soo-jin	Lee Sun-bin, Kim Min-seok, Han Su-a, Ryu Kyung-soo, Jeon Ik-ryung, Baek Joo-hee	
J U N E	25	Sea Tiger	바다호랑이	Jeong Yoon-cheol	Lee Ji-hoon, Son Seong-ho, Park Ho-san	

=== July–September ===
Opening		English title	Native title	Director(s)	Cast	Ref.
J U L Y	9	Ghost Train	괴기열차	Tak Se-woong	Joo Hyun-young, Jeon Bae-soo, Choi Bo-min	
J U L Y	18	Wall to Wall	84제곱미터	Kim Tae-joon	Kang Ha-neul, Yeom Hye-ran, Seo Hyun-woo	
J U L Y	23	Omniscient Reader: The Prophecy	전지적 독자 시점	Kim Byung-woo	Lee Min-ho, Ahn Hyo-seop, Chae Soo-bin, Shin Seung-ho, Nana, Jisoo	
J U L Y	30	My Daughter Is a Zombie	좀비딸	Pil Gam-sung	Jo Jung-suk, Lee Jung-eun, Cho Yeo-jeong, Yoon Kyung-ho, Choi Yoo-ri	
A U G U S T	13	Pretty Crazy	악마가 이사왔다	Lee Sang-geun	Im Yoon-ah, Ahn Bo-hyun, Sung Dong-il, Joo Hyun-young	
A U G U S T	22	Only God Knows Everything	온리 갓 노우즈 에브리띵	Baek Seung-hwan	Shin Seung-ho, Han Ji-eun, Park Myung-hoon, Jeon So-min	
A U G U S T	29	Love Untangled	고백의 역사	Namkoong Sun	Gong Myung, Shin Eun-soo, Cha Woo-min, Yoon Sang-hyun, Kang Mi-na	
S E P T E M B E R	5	Murderer Report	살인자 리포트	Cho Young-jun	Cho Yeo-jeong, Jung Sung-il	
S E P T E M B E R	10	Run to You	전력질주	Lee Seung-hoon	Ha Seok-jin, Lee Shin-young, Dahyun	
S E P T E M B E R	11	The Ugly	얼굴	Yeon Sang-ho	Park Jeong-min, Kwon Hae-hyo, Shin Hyun-been, Im Seong-jae, Han Ji-hyun	
S E P T E M B E R	17	The Cursed	귀시	Hong Won-ki	Yoo Jae-myung, Moon Chae-won, Seo Young-hee, Won Hyun-joon, Solar, Cha Sun-woo, Bae Su-min, Seo Ji-soo, Son Ju-yeon	
S E P T E M B E R	24	No Other Choice	어쩔수가없다	Park Chan-wook	Lee Byung-hun, Son Ye-jin, Park Hee-soon, Lee Sung-min, Yeom Hye-ran, Cha Seung-won	
S E P T E M B E R	26	Mantis	사마귀	Lee Tae-sung	Yim Si-wan, Park Gyu-young, Jo Woo-jin	

=== October–December ===
Opening		English title	Native title	Director(s)	Cast	Ref.
O C T O B E R	1	Your Letter	연의 편지	Kim Yong-hwan	Lee Su-hyun, Kim Min-ju, Min Seung-woo, Nam Doh-hyeong	
O C T O B E R	3	Boss	보스	Ra Hee-chan	Jo Woo-jin, Jung Kyung-ho, Park Ji-hwan, Lee Kyu-hyung, Oh Dal-su, Hwang Woo-seul-hye, Jung Yoo-jin, Ko Chang-seok	
O C T O B E R	7	People and Meat	사람과 고기	Yang Jong-hyun	Park Geun-hyung, Jang Yong, Ye Soo-jung	
O C T O B E R	15	Run to the West	중간계	Kang Yoon-sung	Byun Yo-han, Kim Kang-woo, Bang Hyo-rin, Im Hyung-joon, Yang Se-jong	
O C T O B E R	17	Good News	굿뉴스	Byun Sung-hyun	Sul Kyung-gu, Hong Kyung, Ryoo Seung-bum	
O C T O B E R	22	The World of Love	세계의 주인	Yoon Ga-eun	Seo Soo-bin, Jang Hye-jin	
O C T O B E R	29	The First Ride	퍼스트 라이드	Nam Dae-joong	Kang Ha-neul, Kim Young-kwang, Cha Eun-woo, Kang Young-seok, Han Sun-hwa	
O C T O B E R	29	The Woman in the White Car	하얀 차를 탄 여자	Christine Ko	Jung Ryeo-won, Lee Jung-eun	
N O V E M B E R	5	The Favor	구원자	Shin Joon	Kim Byung-chul, Song Ji-hyo, Kim Hieora	
N O V E M B E R	26	Hallan	한란	Ha Myung-mi	Kim Hyang-gi, Kim Min-chae	
D E C E M B E R	3	Concrete Market	콘크리트 마켓	Hong Ki-won	Lee Jae-in, Hong Kyung, Jung Man-sik, Yoo Su-bin	
D E C E M B E R	3	The Informant	정보원	Kim Seok	Heo Sung-tae, Jo Bok-rae, Seo Min-joo	
D E C E M B E R	3	The People Upstairs	윗집 사람들	Ha Jung-woo	Ha Jung-woo, Gong Hyo-jin, Kim Dong-wook, Lee Hanee	
D E C E M B E R	19	The Great Flood	대홍수	Kim Byung-woo	Kim Da-mi, Park Hae-soo	
D E C E M B E R	24	Even If This Love Disappears From the World Tonight	오늘 밤, 세계에서 이 사랑이 사라진다 해도	Kim Hye-young	Choo Young-woo, Shin Si-ah	
D E C E M B E R	31	Choir of God	신의악단	Kim Hyung-hyup	Park Si-hoo, Jeong Jin-woon	
D E C E M B E R	31	Once We Were Us	만약에 우리	Kim Do-young	Koo Kyo-hwan, Moon Ga-young	

== See also ==
- 2025 in South Korea
- 2025 in film
- List of 2025 box office number-one films in South Korea
- List of South Korean films of 2024
- List of South Korean films of 2026
