= Kang Ha-neul =

South Korean actor (born 1990)

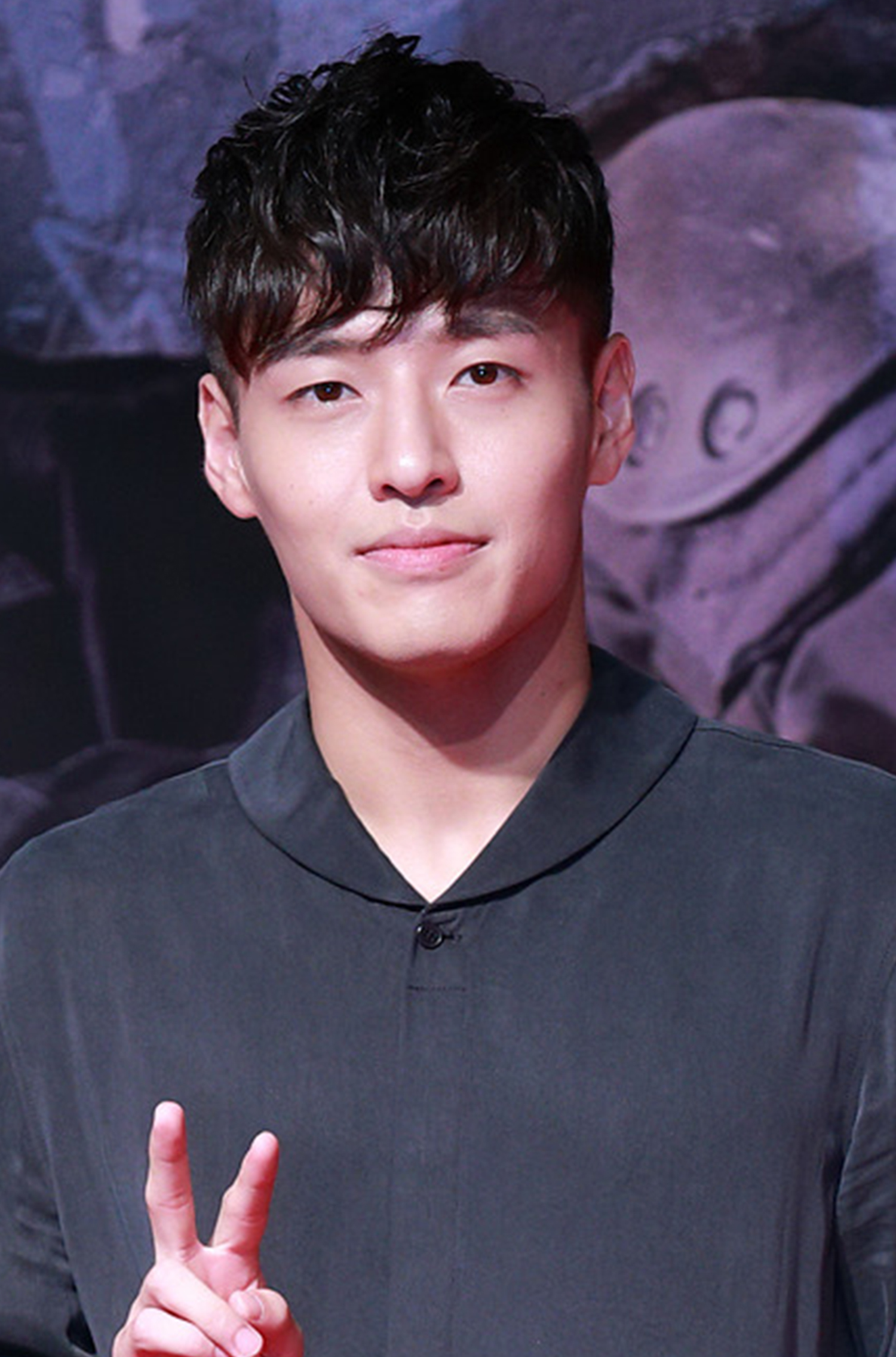
- Kang in August 2017
- Born: Kim Ha-neul; February 21, 1990 (age 36); Busan, South Korea
- Occupation: Actor
- Years active: 2006–present
- Agent: TH Company
- Works: Filmography; theater; discography
- Awards: Full list

Korean name
- Hangul: 김하늘
- RR: Gim Haneul
- MR: Kim Hanŭl

Stage name
- Hangul: 강하늘
- RR: Gang Haneul
- MR: Kang Hanŭl

Kim Ha-neul (Korean: 김하늘; February 21, 1990), known professionally as Kang Ha-neul (강하늘), is a South Korean actor. He gained early recognition through television dramas Misaeng: Incomplete Life (2014) and Moon Lovers: Scarlet Heart Ryeo (2016), receiving critical acclaim for When the Camellia Blooms (2019) which earned him the Baeksang Arts Award for Best Actor. He gained international recognition for his role in the second and third seasons of Squid Game (2024–2025). Known as a prolific Chungmu-ro actor, Kang has also starred in the films Twenty (2015), Dongju: The Portrait of a Poet (2016), New Trial (2017), Midnight Runners (2017), Forgotten (2017), Love Reset (2023), and Yadang: The Snitch (2025).

== Early life and education ==
Kang was born Kim Ha-neul in Busan, South Korea, the eldest of two brothers. His parents were both former theater actors; his father graduated from the Seoul Institute of the Arts, and his mother graduated from the Department of Theater and Film at Kyungsung University. His mother also previously worked as a fashion model.

Kang developed an interest in the performing arts during middle school. Although theater was a familial presence from a young age, his direct involvement began during his second year of middle school when he participated in a church theater production of A Bowl of Udon as a prop team member. He later recounted a strong emotional response, including crying, during the curtain call.

Kang's initial exposure to television entertainment occurred in 2005 when he and his father were featured on the KBS1 Morning Garden, where they achieved three consecutive wins in the family singing contest. The program's host, announcer Lee Geum-hee, later remarked that their performance was particularly memorable.

Kang initially attended a regular high school, where he joined the acting club. Upon expressing his intent to pursue acting professionally, he received full support from his parents. To focus on his artistic development, he subsequently transferred to the National Traditional Arts High School, where he majored in music and theater. Kang was independent from a young age, having worked part-time consistently since middle school. His need to earn his own tuition following his move from Busan made him continue as a part-timer. This experience is cited as contributing to the development of his perceptiveness.

== Career ==
=== 2006–2010: Beginnings ===
Kang began his acting career in musical theatre using his birth name, Kim Ha-neul. His stage debut occurred in 2006 at the age of sixteen with the musical The Celestial Watch, during his first year of high school. Securing a lead role in his first musical reportedly led to the development of stage fright. A teacher advised him regarding the constraints of the stage, stating: "There is no place to hide on the stage. You either win and take control, or you lose and give up." This advice prompted Kang to relearn basic skills in acting, like walking, hand movement, and speaking to overcome his anxieties.

In 2007, at the age of seventeen, Kang secured a main lead role in the KBS Sunday drama My Mom! Super Mom!. For his first scene, which involved playing baseball—a sport he was unfamiliar with—he dedicated a week to practicing at a batting cage. His preparation resulted in a performance that garnered praise from the director. He was cast as Choi Hoon, a popular high school student noted for his academic achievement and appearance, a role for which he was selected from approximately 800 candidates.

"It was a transitional period for me. I didn't feel ready for the acting, and I didn't like being thrust into the public eye through the drama. I really wanted to learn more by doing theater. So even as I was auditioning for My Mom! Super Mom!, I kept wanting to do theater. In the end, after the audition, I called the director and politely asked them if they could let me drop out, as I didn't want to do it."

Despite this unusual refusal from a novice actor, the director persuaded Kang to accept the role. Kang ultimately concluded that his hesitation stemmed from personal insecurity rather than dissatisfaction with the genre. Driven by a sense of responsibility to his supporters, he committed to the project with the determination to exceed his limitations and enhance his skills. Following the completion of the drama, however, he returned to the stage. He successfully auditioned for and was cast as Lee Il in the musical Carpe Diem.

In 2007, Kang made a comeback to television by joining the cast of the KBS daily rural drama Hometown Over the Hill, portraying Kang Jong-hee, the head family's youngest son.

Having already begun his professional career before pursuing higher education, he enrolled at Chung-Ang University as a theatre and film major in 2008. He subsequently took an extended leave of absence from his studies to focus on his acting commitments.

In 2009, Kang was cast as an understudy for the musical Thrill Me, performing the role of Richard on April 10 and 17. That same year, he successfully auditioned for the rock musical Spring Awakening. From June 30, 2009, to January 10, 2010, Kang played the role of Ernst in Spring Awakening, appearing in a cast that included Jo Jung-suk and Kang Mu-yeol (double cast as Moritz), as well as Joo Won (as Melchior). Despite cast changes and absences among his colleagues, Kang performed in every show, totaling 266 performances, a challenging yet fulfilling experience for him.

Actor Hwang Jung-min who had observed Kang's performance in Thrill Me, recruited him for Sam Company immediately following the conclusion of Spring Awakening. Founded by Hwang and his wife in 2010, Kang became the agency's second signed actor after Hwang. That same year, Kang was admitted to the 50th Batch of the Theater Department at Chung-Ang University. Consequently, his character in Hometown Over the Hill was written out of the drama's storyline, departing to pursue further studies in Seoul. Kang returned to the musical Thrill Me, this time taking on the role of Nathan, having previously played Richard in 2009. His performance as Nathan was critically assessed as dominating the stage due to his stable emotional portrayal, breath control, and vocalization.

Also in 2010, Kang successfully auditioned for Lee Joon-ik's film Battlefield Heroes. The film is a sequel to Lee's earlier work, Once Upon a Time in a Battlefield, and focuses on the Silla–Tang Allied Forces' campaign to attack Goguryeo's Pyongyang fortress. Kang was cast as Namsan, the youngest son of Yeon Gaesomun of Goguryeo, who is depicted as conflicted between his two older brothers' opposing stances on negotiation versus warfare.

"I'm still grateful to director Lee Joon-ik for making my first set so beautiful. One day after filming, we were drinking together when he suddenly asked me and [Lee] Kwang-soo to be friends. I said, "Director, how dare we be friends with you?" He replied, "Why? Foreigners are friends with everyone, even their grandparents and children, so why can't we be friends?" Because of that connection, even after Battlefield Heroes was finished, I would go to the director's office to hang out and drink with him. It was so nice."

Kang also secured a supporting role through audition in the film You're My Pet (2011), which starred actress Kim Ha-neul. He was cast as Yang Young-soo, a musical actor and a friend of the male lead, In-ho (played by Jang Keun-suk), who is responsible for guiding In-ho in matters of love. In November 2010, he formally adopted the stage name Kang Ha-neul, replacing his birth name, Kim Ha-neul, to prevent confusion with the actress Kim Ha-neul.

=== 2011–2014: New stage name, film debut, and breakthrough roles in television ===
The year 2011 marked his new beginning as an actor under the stage name Kang Ha-neul. He was credited with this new stage name for his debut film, Battlefield Heroes, which was released in January of that year. In September 2011, Kang appeared as Eunuch Gu-dong in the musical Prince Puzzle. The production, written by Han A-reum and directed by Seo Jae-hyeong of Jukdorok Dalinda, was notable for being staged within the Sungjeongjeon hall of Gyeonghuigung rather than a conventional theatre. Kang noted, "I chose this work because I wanted to work hard until I die." Kang initially believed he was being offered the role of the Crown Prince in Prince Puzzle; however, the Crown Prince character, as suggested by the title, disappears and never appears in the performance. Kang described his role as physically demanding. Noticing his exhaustion, the stage manager advised him to read audience reviews for motivation, implying the production's critical success. Director Lee Joon-ik attended a performance and praised Kang's acting, stating, "You're really good, as expected."

In 2012, Kang was cast in the original musical Black Mary Poppins, produced by Kim Soo-ro. Written, directed, and composed by Seo Youn-mi, a rising dramatist in Daehangno, the thriller was inspired by the Mary Poppins series by P. L. Travers. The musical centered on a 1930s German mansion fire incident involving four siblings. Kang was double-cast alongside Jeon Sung-woo as Hermann, the second son and a painter holding a crucial clue to the case. Jung Sang-yoon and Jang Hyun-duk were double-cast for the role of Hans. Other cast members included Jang Seung-jo, Yoon Na-moo, and Lim Kang-hee.

In November 2012, Kang participated in the third Korean production of Stephen Sondheim's Assassins, performing alongside Hwang Jung-min. For Kang, participation in a Sondheim work fulfilled a long-held dream, despite the challenging nature of the complex melodies and unusual time signatures. He played the dual roles of the Balladeer and Lee Harvey Oswald. The production ran at the Yonkang Hall of Doosan Art Center until February 3, 2013. That same year, Kang also returned to the small screen, starring in the television dramas To the Beautiful You (2012) as Min Hyeon-jae, a high jumper who develops a rivalry with the male lead.

In 2013, he was cast as the lead character Jeong Seon-woo in the Mnet's music drama Monstar, directed by Kim Won-seok. The role required him to learn to play the cello, bass guitar, and contrabass. He dedicated himself to practicing these instruments, sacrificing rest by only sleeping for an hour or 30 minutes. Despite the challenges, he was grateful for the director's faith in him and the praise for his efforts. Following the conclusion of Monstar, Kang made a special appearance in the MBC drama Two Weeks as Kang Seong-jun, the autistic son of Jo Seo-hee (played by Kang Hye-ok).

He then took on the role of Lee Jun-kyung, an illegitimate son of low yangban status, in the MBC Drama Festival one-act drama Unrest, which aired on October 3. His character pursued the truth behind an unjust death, allowing Kang to portray the anguish caused by the Joseon Dynasty's caste system. Kang's portrayal was praised for showcasing his talent through nuanced facial expressions and emotional depth, effectively conveying the character's inner conflict and grief.

In July 2013, Kang secured a supporting role in writer Kim Eun-sook's drama The Heirs (2013), playing Lee Hyo-sin, the charismatic tsundere son of the Prosecutor General and the student council president of Imperial High School. He starred alongside Lee Min-ho, Park Shin-hye, Krystal, Kim Woo-bin, Kim Ji-won, and Park Hyung-sik. Kang had his first onscreen kiss scene in the drama. The Heirs achieved significant success, with domestic ratings peaking at 28.6% and accumulating over one billion views on the Chinese streaming platform IQIYI, leading to widespread recognition for Kang.

In 2014, Kang was cast in the series Angel Eyes, where he portrayed the younger version of the protagonist, Park Dong-joo, with Lee Sang-yoon portraying the adult version. The drama aired on SBS from April 5 to June 15, 2014, on Saturday and Sunday. For this role, Kang received the New Star Award at the 2014 SBS Drama Awards. His first lead role in a feature film followed with the release of Oh In-chun's film Mourning Grave which was released in theaters on July 3, 2014. The film combined elements of horror, romance, drama, and comedy, set in a rural school. Kang starred as In-soo, a reclusive student with the ability to perceive ghosts, a college friend Kim So-eun's character.

He collaborated again with director Kang Won-seok in his series Misaeng: Incomplete Life, portraying Jang Baek-gi, a permanent employee on the Steel Team at One International. The drama's success led to a surge in Kang's recognition, culminating in him winning the Popularity Award at the 2015 Cable TV Broadcasting Awards.

=== 2015–2018: Theater debut, film success, and military musical ===
In 2015, Kang made his debut in a two-hander play, Harold and Maude, alongside veteran actress Park Jeong-ja. Adapted from Colin Higgins' novel, the production explores the intergenerational friendship and affection between Harold, a suicidal 19-year-old, and Maude, an 80-year-old embracing death. It had been previously performed in Korea under the title 19 and 80 starting in 2003. Over the years, Park Jeong-ja has consistently portrayed the role of Maude, while the role of Harold has been played by different actors in each production. The 6th Korean production ran from January 9 to February 28 at the Deloreum Theater of the National Theater of Korea. Kang, playing Harold, commented, "I may be disposable, but I will strive to be an unforgettable disposable Harold. I came across this work and Teacher Park Jeong-ja when I needed to study more and wanted to fill the feeling that something was empty. When I heard that Teacher Park Jeong-ja would be appearing, I naturally decided to appear as well. When we read the script together, the really good lines felt like they were being spoken to me by Teacher Park Jeong-ja, so I felt really comfortable when acting."

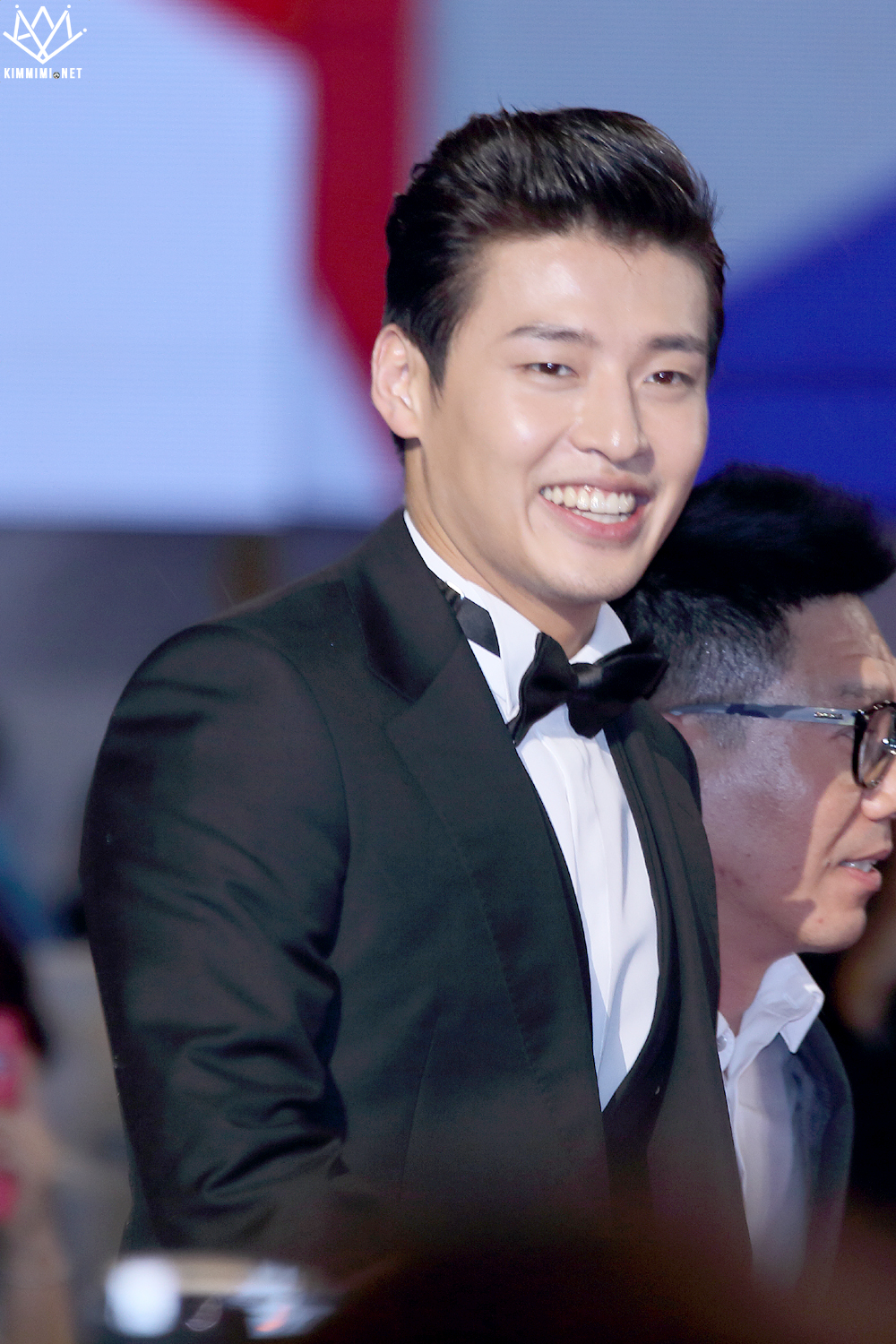
Kang in 2015

That same year, three of Kang's films were released sequentially. His first biopic, musical film C'est si bon premiered on February 5. The film chronicles the folk music movement centered at the C'est Si Bon music center, which introduced renowned folk music artists such as Cho Young-nam, Yoon Hyeong-ju, Song Chang-sik, and Lee Jang-hee. Kang portrayed Yoon Hyeong-ju, a member of the Twinfolio band. Having been exposed to Yoon Hyeong-ju's music through his father, Kang's vocal talent was highlighted as he successfully replicated Yoon's clear, melodious voice and precise enunciation.

On March 5, 2015, Ahn Sang-hoon's period film Empire of Lust was released. Kang played Jin, the King's son-in-law, a character barred from politics and engaged in hedonistic pursuits. It was his first time filming an intense and violent bed scene, which was a challenging experience. Despite the actress reassuring him that it was just acting, he felt guilty and remorseful afterwards.

Shortly thereafter, the coming-of-age film Twenty, directed by Lee Byeong-heon, was released on March 25. Kang starred as Kyung-jae, a studious university student aspiring to a corporate career. For his performance in Twenty, Kang received nominations for Best New Actor at the Baeksang Arts Awards, Blue Dragon Film Awards, and Grand Bell Awards. He subsequently won Best New Actor at the 2015 Golden Cinematography Awards, the Korean Film Actors' Guild Awards, the Korea World Youth Film Festival, and the 2016 Chunsa Film Art Award.

Due to his commitment to appear at the Blue Dragon Film Awards, Kang initially thought he couldn't join the Youth Over Flowers trip. However, he was surprised by the team and taken right after the award show to join the other actors on November 26, 2015. Youth Over Flowers Iceland was initially announced with three cast members: Jung Sang-hoon, Jung Woo, and Jo Jung-suk. The quartet traveled to Iceland on November 25, 2015, with a mission to see the aurora before returning on December 4, 2015.

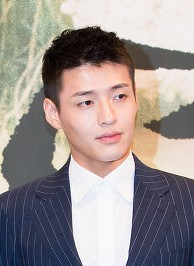
Kang in August 2016

In 2016, Kang starred in the black and white biographical period film Dongju: The Portrait of a Poet, where he played the titular role of poet Yun Dong-ju. This performance earned him Best Actor nominations at the 25th Buil Film Awards and 4th Wildflower Film Awards. He also appeared in the romantic comedy film Like for Likes, playing a young songwriter who suffers a hearing disability. The same year, he co-starred in the historical drama Moon Lovers: Scarlet Heart Ryeo, portraying the 8th Prince Wang Wook, a role that secured him an at the 2016 SBS Drama Awards.

In 2017, Kang starred in the film New Trial, depicting a young man wrongfully imprisoned for a decade following an abusive investigation. He then co-starred with Park Seo-joon in the action comedy film action comedy film Midnight Runners, playing a nerdy cadet of the Korean National Police University. The film was a commercial success, becoming the 4th highest-grossing South Korean film in 2017. In the same year, he also appeared in Jang Hang-jun's mystery thriller film Forgotten alongside Kang Mu-yeol.

Kang then went to his mandatory military service, during which he was selected to appear in the military musical Shinheung Military Academy. In September 2018, he reunited with actor Ji Chang-wook and collaborated with K-Pop idol Kim Sung-kyu from Infinite in the production. As one of the largest initiatives undertaken by the Republic of Korea Army, the musical reached a cumulative audience of 110,000 viewers. Kang's portrayal of the character Paldo earned him a nomination for Best Actor at the 7th Yegreen Musical Awards.

=== 2019–present: When the Camellia Blooms, Squid Game, and continued success ===
In 2019, Kang made a comeback to television with the KBS2 TV series When the Camellia Blooms alongside Gong Hyo-jin. He portrayed Hwang Yong-sik, a police officer with a strong instinct for finding and beating up criminals. He moves back to his hometown Ongsan after being demoted. The drama achieved the highest ratings for a miniseries that year, garnering critical acclaim and numerous accolades, including the Baeksang Arts Award for Best Actor – Television for Kang. He also won several other best actor awards and was ranked second (behind his co-star Gong Hyo-jin) in the Gallup Korea's Actor of the Year survey.

In November 2019, Kang's contract with SEM Company, his agency since 2010, expired. He subsequently joined TH Company, a newly established agency founded by his former manager. Kang then joined the second season of the travel documentary Traveler with Ahn Jae-hong and Ong Seong-wu. From November 30 to December 12, 2019, the trio filmed a two-week journey in Argentina, visiting locations such as Iguazu Falls, Perito Moreno Glacier, and Patagonia.

In January 2020, he returned to the theater in Kang Dong-yeon's Fantasy Fairy Tale, a work that combines play-within-a-play material, dance, mime, music, and acting. Kang acted as the love clown, a character with a pure and emotional personality. The play ran from December 21, 2019, to March 1, 2020, at Dongduk Women's University Performance Arts Center Cotton Hall. This marking his first stage performance since Harold and Maude in 2015.

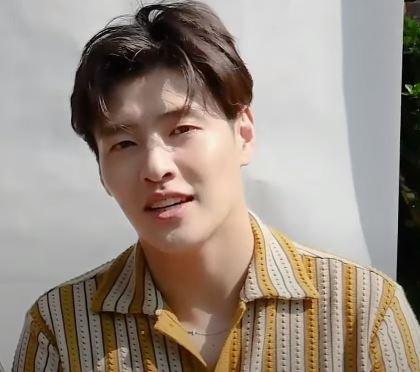
Kang in 2021

In 2021, Kang returned to the silver screen with Waiting for Rain, playing Young-ho, a man who lives aimlessly while corresponding with a lover via letters. He acted opposite Chun Woo-hee. It was released on April 28, 2021. The same year, he was confirmed to star in the mystery thriller film Streaming.

In 2022, Kang starred in the period adventure film The Pirates: The Last Royal Treasure, a sequel to the blockbuster hit The Pirates. The film was released in South Korea on August 6, 2014, by Lotte Entertainment. It has grossed over $64 million worldwide. Later that year, he starred in the JTBC series Insider, playing a judicial trainee who goes undercover in prison to catch a gang leader. Following this, he starred in the drama Curtain Call, which earned him the Top Excellence Actor Award at the 2022 KBS Drama Awards.

On June 24, 2023, it was reported that Kang would join the second season of the series Squid Game. He was also confirmed to lead the film Yadang: the Snitch. The romantic comedy film Love Reset, directed by Nam Dae-jung and co-starring Jung So-min, was released in South Korea on October 3, 2023. The plot centers on a couple who experience amnesia 30 days before their scheduled divorce.

On April 22, 2024, Kang was announced to star in the Netflix thriller movie Wall to Wall, directed by Kang Tae-jun. On October 17, 2024, it was reported that Kang will lead ENA romance drama Tastefully Yours. In the winter of 2024, Kang appeared as Dae-ho second season of Squid Game as Kang Dae-ho / Player 388.

In 2025, Kang had multiple project releases. On March 21, the thriller film Streaming, written and directed by Cho Jang-ho, was released. Kang starred as a top crime channel streamer who investigates an unsolved string of serial murders during a live broadcast. This was followed by the film Yadang: the Snitch, released in South Korea on April 16, 2025, by Plus M Entertainment. Kang portrayed Lee Kang-soo, a broker known as "Yadang" who manages the drug trade while secretly providing information to law enforcement. The film grossed $24.5 million worldwide on a $9.5 million budget, becoming the second-highest-grossing South Korean film of 2025.

He returned to television with romance drama Tastefully Yours. It aired on ENA from May 12 to June 10, 2025, every Monday and Tuesday. It is also available for streaming on Genie TV in South Korea and on Netflix in selected regions. Kang played Han Beom-woo, a successor of a large food company in a love story with a chef (Go Min-si). He then reprised his role as Kang Dae-ho / Player 388 in the third and final season of Squid Game, releasing on June 27, 2025.

His Netflix thriller film Wall to Wall, written and directed by Kim Tae-joon, and co-starring Yeom Hye-ran, and Seo Hyun-woo, was premiered on July 18, 2025, on July 18, 2025. Kang portrayed Noh Woo-sung, a successful homebuyer from apartment unit 1401, suffering from inter-floor noise issues.

== Other ventures ==
=== Endorsement ===
Kang's transition to television led to his initial opportunities as an advertising model. In 2012, his role in the drama To the Beautiful You secured him commercials for Mercilon with Han Ga-young in September and Amos Professional with Cha Soo-yeon in October. The subsequent success of the drama Monstar brought further endorsement offers, including a "Love Taste" commercial for Danish Drinking Yogurt with Ha Yeon-soo.

In 2014, the surge of recognition resulting from the success of The Heirs, significantly increased his commercial activity. He featured in advertisements for the Yogiyo delivery app with Park Shin-hye, Nongshim Ramen with Hyeri, Buckaroo Jeans with Seolhyun, and Daeng Gi Meori Shampoo. The following year, Kang and Kang So-ra reunited as exclusive models for a sports brand following the success of Misaeng. He also appeared in another commercial for Nongshim Ramen, partnered with Seo Jang-hoon for KT Sky Life commercial, and became a model for GSGM Chase Cult clothing brand.

In 2016, his endorsement portfolio expanded significantly after the success of the films Dongju and Twenty. GM Korea selected Kang as the new advertising model for the Chevrolet Trax, and he was chosen as the exclusive model for Caffe Bene. He also partnered with Kim Woo-bin and Lee Jun-ho for The "Smuseul's Part-time Paradise" job search portal. From 2016 to 2017, he endorsed LG's Vonin men's line and WiFi Lunch Box. In 2017, his portfolio expanded to include endorsements for the Kayak flight booking site, Parkland men's suits, and Socar car sharing service. He then took a break during his military enlistment from 2017 to 2018.

Following his successful return to television in the 2019 drama When the Camellia Blooms, Kang re-emerged as a popular choice for commercial modeling. He collaborated with Jeon Yeo-been for the Wadiz crowdfunding platform and featured in CJ CheilJedang's instant rice advertisement alongside child actor Kang Jun. Kang was appointed as a brand ambassador for the outdoor brand Black Yak in 2020. He also secured three-year contracts from 2020 to 2023 with Duolac probiotic supplements and Hyundai Rental Care. In 2021, Kang became the face of Corel kitchen appliances, endorsed financial services with NH Nonghyup Bank alongside Han So-hee, and modeled for beauty brand Aromatica, as well as home and living brands Bomsowa furniture. In 2022, he modeled for the food franchise Noodle Tree.

=== Philanthropy ===
In January 2014, Kang participated in the Ice Bucket Challenge, a fundraising campaign by the ALS Association aimed at developing treatments for ALS patients. In 2016, Kang, alongside Park Kyung-lim, participated in a life-streaming campaign for Save the Children's hat-knitting initiative, designed to provide warmth to newborn babies in developing countries facing harsh weather conditions.

== Personal life ==
=== Military service ===
Kang Ha-neul began his mandatory military service on September 11, 2017, at Nonsan Army Training Center. The completion ceremony took place on October 24 wherein Kang was recognized for his exemplary performance during basic training. On February 22, 2019, Kang was appointed as honorary ambassador of the Military Manpower Administration (MMA). The ceremony took place at the Air Force Hall in Yeongdeungpo, Seoul. As an honorary ambassador, Kang participated in events organized by the MMA until December 2019. Kang was discharged on May 23, 2019.

== Filmography ==
Selected filmography

- Misaeng: Incomplete Life (2014)
- Twenty (2015)
- Dongju: The Portrait of a Poet (2016)
- Moon Lovers: Scarlet Heart Ryeo (2016)
- New Trial (2017)
- Midnight Runners (2017)
- Forgotten (2017)
- When the Camellia Blooms (2019)
- Love Reset (2023)
- Squid Game (2024–2025)
- Yadang: The Snitch (2025)

== Theater ==
=== Musicals ===
Musical play performances
Year	Title		Role	Theater	Date	Ref.
Year	English	Korean	Role	Theater	Date	Ref.
2006	The Celestial Watch	천상시계	Jang Young-shil	Towol Theater, Seoul Arts Center	January 31 – February 12	
2007	Carpe Diem	까르페디엠	Lee Il	National Theater Byuloreum Theater	May 10 to 31	
2008	La Vida		Prince Hamlet	University Performance at Chung-Ang University		
2009	Thrill Me	쓰릴미	Richard Loeb	The STAGE	March 7, 2009 – May 24, 2009	
2009	Spring Awakening	스프링 어웨이크닝	Ernst Röbel	Doosan Art Center Yonkang Hall	June 30, 2009 – January 10, 2010	
2010	Thrill Me	쓰릴미	Nathan Leopold	The STAGE	May 12, 2010 – November 14, 2010	
2010	Thrill Me	쓰릴미 - 부산	Nathan Leopold	MBC Lotte Art Hall	December 24–26, 2010	
2011	Prince Puzzle	왕세자 실종사건	Goo-dong	Gyeonghuigung Sungjeong-jeon	September 1–21, 2011	
2012	Black Mary Poppins	블랙메리포핀스	Herman	Art One Theater 1	May 8 – July 29, 2012	
2012	Prince Puzzle	왕세자 실종사건	Goo-dong	Art One Theater Hall 1	August 7 to October 28	
2012–2013	Assassins	어쌔신	Lee Harvey Oswald / The Balladeer	Doosan Art Center Yeongang Hall	November 20, 2012, to February 3, 2013	
2018	The Shinheung Military School	신흥무관학교	Paldo	Seongnam Arts Center Opera House	October 6–7, 2018	
2018	The Shinheung Military School	신흥무관학교	Paldo	Andong Cultural Arts Center Ungbu Hall	October 12–14, 2018	
2018	The Shinheung Military School	신흥무관학교	Paldo	Mokpo Citizen Cultural Sports Center Grand Theater	October 26–28, 2018	
2018	The Shinheung Military School	신흥무관학교	Paldo	Jeonbuk University Samsung Cultural Center	November 9–11, 2018	
2018	The Shinheung Military School	신흥무관학교	Paldo	Ulsan Hyundai Arts Center Main Theater	November 16–18, 2018	
2018	The Shinheung Military School	신흥무관학교	Paldo	Daejeon Arts Center Art Hall	November 30 – December 2, 2018	
2018	The Shinheung Military School	신흥무관학교	Paldo	Busan Cultural Center Grand Theater	December 14–16, 2018	
2018	The Shinheung Military School	신흥무관학교	Paldo	Ansan Culture & Arts Center Haedoit Theater	December 21–23, 2018	
2018	The Shinheung Military School	신흥무관학교	Paldo	Gyeonggi Arts Center Grand Theater	December 29–30, 2018	
2019	The Shinheung Military School	신흥무관학교	Paldo	Keimyung Arts Center, Daegu	January 4–6, 2019	
2019	The Shinheung Military School	신흥무관학교	Paldo	Kwanglim Arts Center BBCH Hall	February 27 – April 21, 2019	
2019	The Shinheung Military School	신흥무관학교	Paldo	Gwangju Arts Center Grand Theater	May 4–5, 2019	
2019	The Shinheung Military School	신흥무관학교	Paldo	Suseong Art Pia Yongji Hall	May 10–12, 2019	
2019	The Shinheung Military School	신흥무관학교	Paldo	Kangwon National University Baekryeong Art Center (former Baekryeong Cultural Center)	May 31 – June 1, 2019	

=== Plays ===
Theater plays performances
Year	Title		Role	Theater	Date	Ref.
Year	English	Korean	Role	Theater	Date	Ref.
2015	Harold and Maude	해롤드 & 모드	Harold	National Theatre Daloreum Theatre	Jan 9 – Mar 1	
2019 – 2020	Fantasy Fairy Tale	환상동화	Sallang-gwangdae (Love Clown)	Dongduk Women's University Performance Arts Center Cotton Hall	December 21, 2019 – March 1, 2020	

== Discography ==
Title	Year	Notes
"Atlantis Princess"	2013	Tracks from Monstar OST
"Don't Make Me Cry"	2013	Tracks from Monstar OST
"Only That Is My World / March"	2013	Tracks from Monstar OST
"사람, 사랑 (Person, Love)"	2013	Unreleased tracks from Monstar
"I Will Love You"	2013	Unreleased tracks from Monstar
"After Love Gone"	2013	Unreleased tracks from Monstar
"Three Things I Have Left (Acoustic Version)"	2014	Track from Angel Eyes OST
"When The Saints Go Marching In "	2015	Tracks from C'est si bon OST
"조개껍질 묶어"	2015	Tracks from C'est si bon OST
"백일몽"	2015	Tracks from C'est si bon OST
"사랑하는 마음"	2015	Tracks from C'est si bon OST
"하얀 손수건"	2015	Tracks from C'est si bon OST
"You Mean Everything To Me"	2015	Unreleased tracks from C'est si bon
"My Bonnie Lies Over The Ocean"	2015	Unreleased tracks from C'est si bon
"Self-portrait"	2016	Track from Dongju: The Portrait of a Poet OST
"좋아해줘"	2016	Track from Like for Likes OST
"Piece of the Sky"	2018	Tracks from Shinheung Military Academy musical
"What Is This?"	2018	Tracks from Shinheung Military Academy musical
"Farewell"	2018	Tracks from Shinheung Military Academy musical
