= Hitman 2 (2025 film) =

2025 film by Choi Won-sub

- Theatrical release poster
- Hangul: 히트맨 2
- RR: Hiteumaen 2
- MR: Hit'ŭmaen 2
- Directed by: Choi Won-sub
- Written by: Choi Won-sub; Shin Joong-ryul
- Produced by: Kim Do-yeon
- Starring: Kwon Sang-woo; Jung Joon-ho; Lee Yi-kyung; Hwang Woo-seul-hye; Kim Sung-oh; Lee Ji-won
- Cinematography: Nam Dong-geun
- Production companies: Berry Good Studio; Studio Target
- Distributed by: By4M Studio
- Release date: January 22, 2025
- Running time: 118 minutes
- Country: South Korea
- Language: Korean
- Box office: US$17.9 million

Hitman 2 (Korean: 히트맨 2) is a 2025 South Korean action comedy film directed by Choi Won-sub. The film, a sequel to the 2020 film Hitman: Agent Jun, stars Kwon Sang-woo, Jung Joon-ho, Lee Yi-kyung, Hwang Woo-seul-hye, Kim Sung-oh, and Lee Ji-won. It was released on January 22, 2025.

== Premise ==
Jun, who gained brief fame as the creator of the webtoon Assassination Agent Jun, quickly earns the reputation of a "brainless writer" after Season 2 gets criticized miserably, but things take a turn when a real-life terrorist attack mirrors the plot of Season 2, leaving Jun wrongly accused by the NIS of being the mastermind behind the crime.

== Cast ==
- Kwon Sang-woo as Kim Bong-joon / Jun / Kim Soo-hyuk
- Jung Joon-ho as Cheon Deok-kyu
- Lee Yi-kyung as Cheol
- Hwang Woo-seul-hye as Lee Mi-na
- Kim Sung-oh as Chang Cheol-ryong / Pierre Jean
- Lee Ji-won as Kim Ga-young
- Lee Soon-won as Cha Yong-chool, National Intelligence Service agent
- Han Ji-eun as Jeon Hae-in, Pierre Jean's subordinate the final runner
- Lee Joon-hyuk as Park Kyu-man, editor in chief
- Park Kwang-jae as Anton, Pierre Jean's subordinate
- Kim Han-joon as Sasha, Pierre Jean's subordinate
- Alexander as Vladimir, Russian terrorist loses left eye
- Song You-ha as Kunimura, Yakuza boss who lost his left index and middle fingers
- Park Tae-san as Cheng, Chinese killer with two large scars on his face
- Choi Ji-woo as doctor

== Production ==
In May 2023, Kim Sung-oh and Lee Soon-won joined the original cast of the film.

Principal photography began on June 2, 2023, and filming ended on September 3, 2023.

== Release ==
Hitman 2 premiered in South Korean theaters on January 22, 2025 released by Bypoem Studio.

== Reception ==
=== Box office ===
The film was released on January 22, 2025 on 1,410 screens. It opened at first place at the South Korean box office with 105,911 running audiences. It surpassed the number of cinegoers on the opening day of the previous work Hitman: Agent Jun released in 2020. In the first weekend it was at 2nd place with 604,887 commutative audience at the Korean box office. On January 29, the film surpassed 1 million audience on 8th day of its release. It is the first Korean film to do so in 2025 at the box office. On February 3, it crossed 2 million viewers on 13th day of its release.

As of August 7, 2025, the film has grossed US$17,258,878 from 2,547,598 admissions, making it one of the highest-grossing Korean films released in 2025 at the South Korean box office.
