= Kim Ji-seok (actor) =

South Korean actor

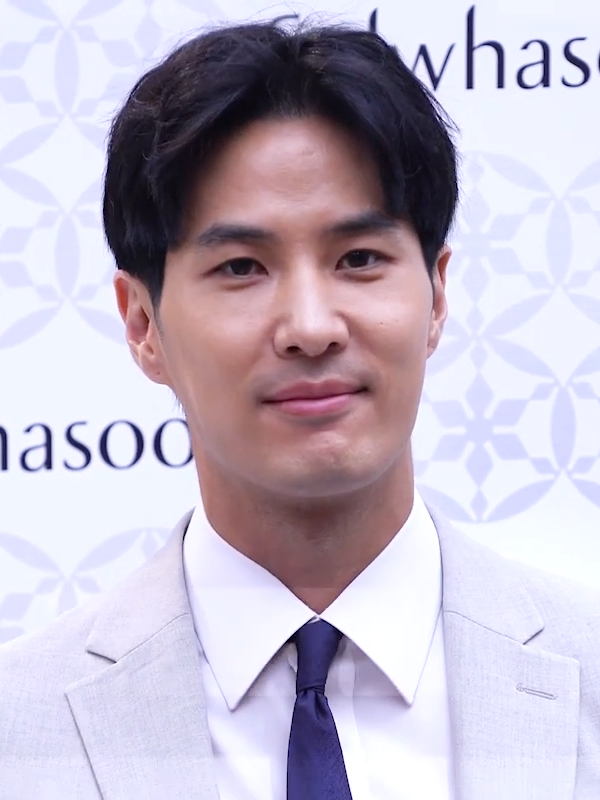
- Born: Kim Bo-seok; April 21, 1981 (age 45); Seoul, South Korea
- Other name: Kim Ji-suk
- Education: Hankuk University of Foreign Studies - German; Kyung Hee University Graduate School of Journalism and Communication - Cultural Contents Planning
- Occupation: Actor
- Years active: 2001–present
- Agent: Alien Company

Korean name
- Hangul: 김보석
- Hanja: 金寶石
- RR: Gim Boseok
- MR: Kim Posŏk

Stage name
- Hangul: 김지석
- Hanja: 金知碩
- RR: Gim Jiseok
- MR: Kim Chisŏk

Kim Ji-seok (born Kim Bo-seok on April 21, 1981) is a South Korean actor.

== Early life and education ==
Kim is the grandson of Kim Seong-il, who worked as an independent activist in Manchuria during the Japanese colonial era. His grandfather was a student of Kim Gu, a Manchurian independence activist.

Kim Bo-seok debuted in 2001 as a rapper in the five-member Eurodance boyband LEO (리오), formed to capitalize on the success of then-popular boyband g.o.d, however, LEO never hit it big, and the group disbanded after eight months.

After failing the exam to get into the theater department, Kim majored in German at the Hankuk University of Foreign Studies. Having attended middle school and high school in England, Kim is also fluent in English, and received his secondary teaching certificate in German and English in 2006. He also has a master's degree in Cultural Contents Planning from Kyung Hee University's Graduate School of Journalism and Communication.

Kim was told by the head of his agency that his birth name could be confused with veteran actors Jung Bo-seok and Kim Bo-seong, he was given the stage name "Kim Ji-seok."

== Career ==
Kim began his acting career by appearing in the 2004 music video of Kim Hyung-joong's "She's Laughing", followed by several minor roles. Though his daily drama Likeable or Not recorded high ratings of over 40% in 2007–2008, Kim still did not become a household name. Then a year later, Kim played a member of the Korean national ski jumping team in Take Off, which became the second-highest grossing Korean film in 2009. His popularity increased even more when he played an immature, womanizing slave hunter ("chuno") in period drama The Slave Hunters, the lover of a transgender woman in comedy Lady Daddy, and a competitive ex-boyfriend in Personal Taste.

Kim's first post-army acting project was horror film Two Moons (also known as The Sleepless), released in July. This was followed by television romantic comedies I Need Romance 2012 in June, and Cheongdam-dong Alice in December. Kim then starred in Wonderful Mama (2013), Angel Eyes (2014), Unkind Ladies (2015), and Cheer Up. He also appeared as one of the cast members of talk show Hot Brain: Problematic Men.

Kim then starred in the hit romantic comedy drama, Another Oh Hae-young (2016), garnering praise from viewers for his comic acting. This was followed by acclaimed historical drama The Rebel, which gained him recognition by critics for his outstanding portrayal of King Lee Yong. Kim was then cast as the lead male role in the romantic comedy drama Children of the 20th Century (2017) alongside Han Ye-seul, followed by another romantic comedy drama Top Star U-back as the titular character.

In 2019, Kim starred in the romantic comedy thriller When the Camellia Blooms.

In 2021, Kim will write a book, Writing your name on the breath of dawn, to be published on December 13, 2021.

== Personal life ==
=== Military service ===
Kim enlisted for his mandatory military service on May 24, 2010, at the Nonsan training center in South Chungcheong Province for five weeks of basic training. After serving active duty with the Defense Media Agency of the Ministry of National Defense in Yongsan-dong, Yongsan-gu, Seoul, he was discharged in March 2012.

=== Relationship ===
In August 2024, it was confirmed that Kim was in a relationship with actress Lee Ju-myoung.

== Filmography ==
=== Film ===
Year	Title	Role	Notes	Ref.
2005	Her Name Is... DHR7	Dong-guk		
2005	Seoul Raiders	Gangster underling		
2005	Love in Magic	Yoon Woo-suk		
2006	200 Pounds Beauty	Charcoal	cameo	
2008	What Happened Last Night?	Elevator guy	cameo	
2008	Eye for an Eye	Song Yoo-gon		
2009	Take Off	Kang Chil-gu		
2010	Lady Daddy	Jun-seok		
2012	The Sleepless	Seok-ho		
2013	My Paparotti	Drunken man	cameo	
2026	Husbands in Action	Ma Do-jun		

=== Television series ===
Year	Title	Role	Notes	Ref.
2003	Sang Doo! Let's Go to School		(extra)	
2004	Among Agasshi and Ajumma	Jo Mi-ryeong's younger brother		
2004	Nonstop 5	Kim Ji-seok	guest	
2005	Drama City "Summer, A Tale of Goodbye"	Seong-yeob's friend		
2006	I Want to Love	Ji Eun-woo		
2006	The Vineyard Man	Kim Kyung-min		
2006	Just Run!	Bae Man-soo		
2007	Couple Breaking	Lee Jung-jae		
2007	Likeable or Not	Kang Baek-ho		
2008	Strongest Chil Woo	Peasant petitioner	Cameo (episode 1)	
2008	Star's Lover	Actor	Cameo (episode 1)	
2009	Hometown Legends "Kiss of the Vampire"	Hyeon		
2010	The Slave Hunters	Wang-son		
2010	Personal Taste	Han Chang-ryul		
2011	Marching 1	Corporal Kang Dae-san		
2012	I Need Romance 2012	Shin Ji-hoon		
2012	Cheongdam-dong Alice	Tommy Hong		
2013	Wonderful Mama	Go Young-soo		
2013	KBS Drama Special "Came to Me and Became a Star"	Kang-seok		
2014	I Need Romance 3	Bar owner with dog	Cameo (episode 3)	
2014	Angel Eyes	Kang Ji-woon		
2015	Unkind Ladies	Lee Doo-jin		
2015	Cheer Up!	Yang Tae-bum		
2016	Another Miss Oh	Lee Jin-sang		
2016	Drinking Solo	Lee Jin-sang	Cameo (episode 13)	
2017	Introverted Boss	Yoo-hee's husband	Cameo	
2017	The Rebel	Lee Yong (Yeonsangun of Joseon)		
2017	Children of the 20th Century	Gong Ji-won		
2017	Irish Uppercut	Woo Si-hyung		
2018	Top Star U-back	Yoo Baek		
2019	When the Camellia Blooms	Kang Jong-ryul		
2020	My Unfamiliar Family	Park Chan-hyuk		
2021	Doom at Your Service	Jo Dae-han	Cameo (episode 2)	
2021	Monthly Magazine Home	Yoo Ja-sung		
2023	New Recruit	Oh Seung-yoon	Season 2	
2026	OK! Let's Get Divorced	Ji Won-ho		

=== Web series ===
Year	Title	Role	Notes	Ref.
2021	Work Later, Drink Now	Kim Hak-soo	Cameo	
2022	Kiss Sixth Sense	Lee Pil-yo		

=== Web shows ===
Year	Title	Role	Notes	Ref.
2021–2022	Double Trouble	Host		
2022	Saturday Night Live Korea	Host	Episode 9 – Season 2	

=== Music video appearances ===
Year	Song title	Artist
2004	"She's Laughing"	Kim Hyung-joong
2007	"사랑했었는데"	Sung-ah
2013	"The Day to Love"	Lee Seung-chul

=== Television shows ===
Year	Title	Notes	Ref.
2008	Interview Game	MC	
2010–2012	Work Plus Success		
2015–2020	Hot Brain: Problematic Men	Cast member	
2021	Save me! Rooms	Host	
2022	Map to Go Again	Host with Kim Shin-young	
2022	Suspicious Neighbor	Host	
2022	Golf King	Cast Member; Season 3	

=== Radio shows ===
Year	Title	Network	Role	Note	Ref.
2021	Kim Young-chul's Power FM	SBS Power FM	Special DJ	June 30 – July 2	

== Discography ==
Album information	Track listing
LEO: The First Album: Album; Artist: LEO; Released: May 9, 2001; Label: Synnara Music	Track listing: 1. Intro; 2. 그대 천천히 (Slow Down, Baby); 3. 그녀가 나를 버렸다 (I Was Abandoned By Her); 4. Good Friend; 5. 나를 기억하는지 (If You Still Remember Me); 6. 아버지의 꿈 (Father's Dream); 7. First Time In Love; 8. Drive; 9. First Dream; 10. 우리가 함께 할께 One (We'Ll Be With You); 11. Cherish; 12. C'Mon C'Mon (Come On Come On); 13. 함께한 약속 (The Promise That We Made); 14. Slow Down, Baby (Remix Version)
독.불.장.군: Track from Likeable or Not OST; Artist: Kim Ji-seok; Released: November 16, 2007; Label: KBS Media	Track listing: 10. 독.불.장.군

== Awards and nominations ==
Year	Award	Category	Nominated work	Result	Ref.
2007	KBS Drama Awards	Excellence Award, Actor in a Daily Drama	Likeable or Not	Nominated	
2007	KBS Drama Awards	Best New Actor	Likeable or Not	Won	
2008	44th Baeksang Arts Awards	Best New Actor (TV)	Likeable or Not	Nominated	
2009	17th Chunsa Film Art Awards	Ensemble Acting Award	Take Off	Won	
2009	32nd Golden Cinematography Awards	Best New Actor	Take Off	Won	
2009	30th Blue Dragon Film Awards	Best New Actor	Take Off	Nominated	
2009	KBS Drama Awards	Best Actor in a One-Act Drama/Special	Kiss of the Vampire	Nominated	
2013	SBS Drama Awards	Excellence Award, Actor in a Miniseries	Cheongdam-dong Alice	Nominated	
2014	SBS Drama Awards	Special Award, Actor in a Drama Special	Angel Eyes	Nominated	
2015	KBS Drama Awards	Best Supporting Actor	Unkind Ladies, Cheer Up!	Nominated	
2016	tvN10 Awards	Two Star Award	Another Oh Hae-young	Nominated	
2016	tvN10 Awards	Scene-Stealer Award, Actor	Another Oh Hae-young	Nominated	
2017	Korea Cable TV Awards	Most Popular Star Award	Another Oh Hae-young	Won	
2017	Korea Cable TV Awards	Scene Stealer Award	Another Oh Hae-young	Won	
2017	Korea Cable TV Awards	Best Couple Award with Ye Ji-won	Another Oh Hae-young	Won	
2017	10th Korea Drama Awards	Top Excellence Award, Actor	The Rebel	Won	
2017	1st The Seoul Awards	Best Supporting Actor	The Rebel	Nominated	
2017	MBC Drama Awards	Top Excellence Award, Actor in a Monday-Tuesday Drama	Children of the 20th Century	Won	
2017	MBC Drama Awards	Popularity Award, Actor	Children of the 20th Century	Nominated	
2019	KBS Drama Awards	Excellence Award, Actor in a Mid-length Drama	When the Camellia Blooms	Won	
2019	KBS Drama Awards	Netizen Award, Actor	When the Camellia Blooms	Nominated	
2019	KBS Drama Awards	Best Couple Award with Kim Kang-hoon	When the Camellia Blooms	Nominated	
