= Like for Likes =

- Theatrical release poster
- Hangul: 좋아해줘
- RR: Joahaejwo
- MR: Choahaejwŏ
- Directed by: Park Hyun-jin
- Written by: Yoo Young-ah
- Produced by: Lee Han-seung; Yoon Je-kyoon
- Starring: Lee Mi-yeon; Choi Ji-woo; Kim Joo-hyeok; Yoo Ah-in; Kang Ha-neul; Esom
- Cinematography: Shin Tae-ho
- Edited by: Kim Sang-bum; Kim Jae-bum
- Music by: Kim Hong-jib; Lee Jin-hee
- Production companies: Liyang Film; JK Film
- Distributed by: CJ Entertainment
- Release date: February 17, 2016
- Running time: 120 minutes
- Country: South Korea
- Language: Korean
- Box office: US$5.7 million

Like for Likes (Korean: 좋아해줘) is a 2016 South Korean romantic comedy film directed by Park Hyun-jin. It was released in South Korea on February 17, 2016, by CJ Entertainment.

== Plot ==
The movie follows three couples relying on social media to communicate their innermost feelings.

Recently discharged from the military, Noh Jin-woo (Yoo Ah-in) is a popular actor. Jo Kyung-ah (Lee Mi-yeon) is a screenwriter for television drama series. She doesn't want to ask Jin-woo, but asks him anyway to perform in her next drama series. Jin-woo turns down her offer. At a wedding, Jin-woo sees Kyung-ah's young child Bom. Jin-woo wonders if he is the father.

Jung Sung-chan (Kim Joo-hyuk) runs a small Japanese restaurant. Before his wedding, he leases an apartment from flight attendant Ham Joo-ran (Choi Ji-woo), but Sung-chan is dumped by his fiancé. At the same time, flight attendant Joo-ran learns that she was ripped off and now doesn't have a place to stay. Sung-chan offers to share the apartment with her.

Lee Soo-ho (Kang Ha-neul) is a songwriter. He is also deaf from a car accident that he was involved in, during high school. Soo-ho has never had a girlfriend. He is a regular customer at Sung-chan's Japanese restaurant. One day, at Sung-chan's restaurant, he meets drama series producer Jang Na-yeon (Esom). They have a good time eating and drinking together. After exchanging messages on Facebook, Soo-ho and Na-yeon go on a few dates together. Soo-ho is unable to tell her about his hearing disability.

== Cast ==
- Lee Mi-yeon as Jo Kyung-ah
- Choi Ji-woo as Ham Joo-ran
- Kim Joo-hyuk as Jung Sung-chan
- Yoo Ah-in as Noh Jin-woo
- Kang Ha-neul as Lee Soo-ho
- Esom as Jang Na-yeon
- Han Jae-young as Jung Il-kyu
- Baek Chang-min as Jung Ui-joo
- Park Hee-von as Jung Ui-joo's mother
- Heo Jung-do as Director Heo
- Lee Jung-eun as Real estate office middle-aged woman
- Jin Sun-mi as Ham Joo-ran's friend
- Go Hyun as Noh Jin-woo's manager
- Jung Yoo-jin as Lead actress
- Ji Yoon-ho as Jae-byung
- Im Chae-sun as Delivery man
- Lee Seung-yeon as Chief flight attendant
- Park Seul-gi as Reporter
- Choi Young-do as CEO Kim
- Jo Dae-hee as CEO Jang
- Kim Seung-hoon as Representative Kim
- Park Myung-shin as New drama series screenwriter
- Sung Do-hyun as New drama series PD
- Sun Joo-ah as Jae-byung's girlfriend
- Ha Seok-jin as Kang Min-ho (cameo)

== Reception ==
The film was third placed on its opening weekend in South Korea, grossing US$2.09 million.
