= Curtain Call (South Korean TV series) =

2022 South Korean television series

- Promotional poster
- Hangul: 커튼콜
- Lit.: Curtain Call
- RR: Keoteunkol
- MR: K'ŏt'ŭnk'ol
- Genre: Romance; Family drama
- Written by: Jo Sung-geol
- Directed by: Yoon Sang-ho
- Starring: Kang Ha-neul; Ha Ji-won; Go Doo-shim; Sung Dong-il; Jung Ji-so; Noh Sang-hyun; Kwon Sang-woo
- Music by: Kim Soo-hyun; Kim Woo-jung; Yang Chae-eun; Won Ye-na; Cheon Min-jeong
- Country of origin: South Korea
- Original language: Korean
- No. of episodes: 16

Production
- Executive producers: Kwon Gye-hong (KBS); Ahn Su-jin (CP); Chu Jae-soon (CP)
- Producers: Jo Yoon-jung; Shin Kyung-gyun; Woo Yeo-su-ran
- Running time: 60 minutes
- Production company: Victory Contents

Original release
- Network: KBS2
- Release: October 31 – December 27, 2022

Curtain Call (Korean: 커튼콜; RR: Keoteunkol) is a 2022 South Korean television series starring Kang Ha-neul, Ha Ji-won, Go Doo-shim, Sung Dong-il, Jung Ji-so, Noh Sang-hyun, and Kwon Sang-woo. The series revolves around a man who plays the role of a grandson who defected to fulfill his grandmother's last wish from the North, a woman who falls in love with that man, and the people involved in the play. It premiered on KBS2 on October 31, 2022, and aired every Monday and Tuesday at 21:50 (KST). It is also available for streaming on Amazon Prime Video in selected regions.

== Synopsis ==
During the Korean War, while attempting to escape North Korea, Geum-soon (Go Doo-shim) is separated from her husband and infant son. She manages to make it to South Korea where she begins her new life, running Nakwon Inn on Korea's southern coast, while waiting for her lost family. She remarries, has a son and grandchildren and builds the Nakwon Group, the top hotel chain in the country. Years later, at a reunion between separated families, Geum-soon gets a chance to meet her grown-up North Korean son and his son named Ri Moon-sung. She tried to invite them to live with her in the South for a better life but her son refused, having been brainwashed by North Korean propaganda, causing him to despise his mother for being a capitalist. But at the next reunion, she is informed about the death of her son, losing any contact with the grandson as well.

In the present day, Geum-soon is dying of cancer and has only three months left. Geum-soon's granddaughter and the manager of the hotel, Park Se-yeon (Ha Ji-won), works hard to protect Nakwon's name and keep the chain in the family while her elder brother tries to sell it. Meanwhile, Geum-soon's trusted right-hand man, Jeong Sang-cheol (Sung Dong-il) who has been searching for her North Korean grandson for years, finally tracks him down only to learn that he has become a smuggler and a violent criminal operating in China. Jeong decides to keep this truth from Geum-soon but comes up with a plan to grant her last wish to meet her grandson again.

Jeong then approaches Yoo Jae-hoon (Kang Ha-neul), a struggling actor of an unknown theater company who does several part time jobs to make ends meet, after watching his performance as a North Korean soldier in a play. Jeong asks Yoo to impersonate Geum-soon's North Korean grandson. In exchange for 500 million won, Yoo begins to play that role for three months.

== Cast ==
=== Main ===
- Kang Ha-neul as Yoo Jae-heon / Jung-moon
1. Yoo Jae-heon: A theater actor in a local theater company. He receives a sudden offer from an old gentleman to play the defecting grandson of a certain grandmother, and he faces a major turning point in his life.
2. Jung-moon: Geum-soon's North Korean husband from whom she separated decades ago.
- Ha Ji-won as Park Se-yeon

Geum-soon's granddaughter. The youngest daughter and the general manager of Hotel Nakwon. She and her brothers lost their parents at a young age and were raised by their grandmother.

- Go Doo-shim as Ja Geum-soon
  - Ha Ji-won as young Geum-soon

The founder of Hotel Nakwon, a leading hotel chain in Korea. During the Korean War she descends to the South and is separated from her husband and child. She grows a hotel while waiting for the two of them. She wishes to see her grandson Moon-sung one last time.

- Sung Dong-il as Jeong Sang-cheol
  - Dawon as young Jeong Sang-cheol

The former manager of Hotel Nakwon and the right-hand man of Geum-soon. Even after retiring from his managerial position, he looks after and assists Geum-soon.

- Jung Ji-so as Seo Yoon-hee

A theater actress in Yoo Jae-heon's theater company. She is asked to play the wife's role of the defecting grandson played by Yoo Jae-heon.

- Noh Sang-hyun as Ri Moon-sung
  - Kang Ji-yong as young Moon-sung

Geum-soon's North Korean grandson. A smuggler from North Korea and a member of a Korean-Chinese drug organization.

- Kwon Sang-woo as Bae Dong-jae

Se-yeon's ex-fiancé. The successor of a giant conglomerate Samwoo who owns a distribution chain.

=== Supporting ===
==== Geum-soon's family ====
- Ji Seung-hyun as Park Se-jun

The first grandson and the major shareholder of Hotel Nakwon founded by his grandmother Geum-soon.

- Choi Dae-hoon as Park Se-gyu

The second grandson of Hotel Nakwon's founder.

- Hwang Woo-seul-hye as Hyun Ji-won

Park Se-jun's wife who is a former announcer.

- Bae Hae-sun as Yoon Jung-sook
  - Park Ji-won as young Yoon Jung-sook

A housekeeper of Hotel Nakwon for a long time, now serving as Geum-soon's housekeeper.

==== Others ====
- Kim Hyun-sook as Hong Ra-kyung

Manager of Hotel Nakwon who works under Park Se-yeon's direct management.

- Jung Yoo-jin as Song Hyo-jin

Park Se-yeon's close friend and the youngest daughter of a large construction company.

- Son Jong-hak as Kim Seung-do

A longtime employee and managing director of Hotel Nakwon.

- Han Jae-Young as Jang Tae-joo

A former detective who has been tracking the whereabouts of the real grandson of Geum-soon at the request of Jeong Sang-cheol.

=== Special appearances ===
- Ahn Nae-sang as a doctor
- Lee Yi-kyung as Park No-kwang

A close friend of Yoo Jae-heon.

- Kim Young-min as Ri Young-hoon

Geum-soon's son who was separated from her during the war when he was a child.

- Choi Jung-won as Song Hyo-jin's acquaintance
- Jang Hye-jin as Oh Ga-young

Seo Yoon-hee's mother.

- Hong Ki-joon as a Korean-Chinese
- Jung Eui-jae as Mu-jin

Geum-soon's South Korean husband.

- Baek Jin-hee as Jin-sook

Wife of Ri Moon-sung.

- Choi Jung-woo as Cheol-jin

A judge. When he was a child, his mother fled with him from the North to the South during the Korean War.

- Kim Kang-hyun as a reporter
- Lim Sa-rang as Staff of Nakwon Hotel

== Production ==
The early working title of the series was A Tree Dies Standing (나무는 서서 죽는다; Namuneun seoseo jungneunda). The roles of Park Se-yeon and Geum-soon were first offered to Son Ye-jin and Youn Yuh-jung respectively. In July 2022, it was reported that filming was under progress.

The press conference of the drama which was scheduled to be held on October 31, 2022, was canceled due to the aftermath of the Itaewon Halloween crowd crush.

== Original soundtrack ==
=== Part 1 ===
Released on October 31, 2022
No.	Title	Lyrics	Music	Artist	Length
1.	"Waiting For You" (오지 않는 사람아)	Gadeul	KingMing	Baek Ji-young	4:06
2.	"Waiting For You" (오지 않는 사람아; Inst.)		KingMing		4:06
Total length:					8:12

=== Part 2 ===
Released on November 1, 2022
No.	Title	Lyrics	Music	Artist	Length
1.	"Dandelion" (민들레야)	Red Anne	Red Anne	Sumi Jo	3:14
2.	"Dandelion" (민들레야; Inst.)		Red Anne		3:14
Total length:					6:28

=== Part 3 ===
Released on November 7, 2022
No.	Title	Lyrics	Music	Artist	Length
1.	"Oh, It's Love" (그래 사랑이야)	Kim Se-jin; Gadeul	Kim Se-jin; Midnight	Song Yuvin	3:56
2.	"Oh, It's Love" (그래 사랑이야; Inst.)		Kim Se-jin; Midnight		3:56
Total length:					7:42

=== Part 4 ===
Released on November 8, 2022
No.	Title	Lyrics	Music	Artist	Length
1.	"You Are The Sea" (너는 바다)	Mokusura (CLEF); CLEF Crew	Mokusura (CLEF); CLEF Crew	Kim Na-young	4:06
2.	"You Are The Sea" (너는 바다; Inst.)		Mokusura (CLEF); CLEF Crew		4:06
Total length:					8:12

=== Part 5 ===
Released on November 14, 2022
No.	Title	Lyrics	Music	Artist	Length
1.	"For A Long Time" (오랫동안)	Score (13); Megatone (13)	Score (13); Megatone (13)	Sung Si-kyung	3:45
2.	"For A Long Time" (오랫동안; Inst.)		Score (13); Megatone (13)		3:45
Total length:					7:30

=== Part 6 ===
Released on November 22, 2022
No.	Title	Lyrics	Music	Artist	Length
1.	"Love Alone" (사랑하면 안 되는 사람)	Gadeul	Bigguyrobin	Onestar	3:27
2.	"Love Alone" (사랑하면 안 되는 사람; Inst.)		Bigguyrobin		3:27
Total length:					6:54

=== Part 7 ===
Released on December 5, 2022
No.	Title	Lyrics	Music	Artist	Length
1.	"Stand By Your Side"	Gadeul	Kim Se-jin; Heo Sung-jin	Lee Su-hyun	4:30
2.	"Stand By Your Side" (Inst.)		Kim Se-jin; Heo Sung-jin		4:30
Total length:					9:00

=== Part 8 ===
Released on December 6, 2022
No.	Title	Lyrics	Music	Artist	Length
1.	"Love is" (사랑이란 게)	Nautilus; New York King	Choi Sang-eon; Kim Hong-joon	Nautilus	3:43
2.	"Love is" (사랑이란 게; Inst.)		Choi Sang-eon; Kim Hong-joon		3:43
Total length:					7:26

=== Part 9 ===
Released on December 12, 2022
No.	Title	Lyrics	Music	Artist	Length
1.	"Love Is Blooming" (사랑이 피어나)	Gadeul	Nine; Nap!er	Han Seung-yun	3:44
2.	"Love Is Blooming" (사랑이 피어나; Inst.)		Nine; Nap!er		3:44
Total length:					7:28

=== Part 10 ===
Released on December 19, 2022
No.	Title	Lyrics	Music	Artist	Length
1.	"We Were" (우린; (feat. (Halim)))	Lee Chan-hyuk	Lee Chan-hyuk	Jung Ji-so	3:56
2.	"We Were" (우린; Inst.)		Lee Chan-hyuk		3:56
Total length:					7:42

== Viewership ==
Curtain Call : South Korea viewers per episode (thousands)

Season	Episode number																Average
Season	1	2	3	4	5	6	7	8	9	10	11	12	13	14	15	16	Average
1	1272	558	954	1009	856	966	739	752	733	898	980	1093	N/A	829	981	969	N/A

Source: Audience measurement performed nationwide by Nielsen Korea.

Average TV viewership ratings
Ep.	Original broadcast date	Average audience share		
Ep.	Original broadcast date	Nielsen Korea		TNmS
Ep.	Original broadcast date	Nationwide	Seoul	Nationwide
1	October 31, 2022	7.2% (3rd)	7.2% (2nd)	5.9% (7th)
2	November 1, 2022 (Note: The dip in ratings for Episode 2 is due to the sudden extension of the 2022 Professional Baseball KBO League which aired in the earlier timeslot resulting to an hour delay in broadcast.)	3.1% (13th)	3.1% (14th)	2.7% (19th)
3	November 7, 2022	5.6% (11th)	5.4% (12th)	4.7% (17th)
4	November 8, 2022	6.0% (6th)	5.5% (7th)	5.8% (9th)
5	November 14, 2022	4.7% (16th)	4.2% (16th)	4.3% (18th)
6	November 15, 2022	5.6% (9th)	5.3% (6th)	5.2% (13th)
7	November 22, 2022 (Note: The November 21 broadcast was canceled due to the 2022 World Cup broadcast and aired on November 22 instead.)	4.3% (15th)	3.9% (16th)	4.2% (16th)
8	November 29, 2022 (Note: The November 28 broadcast was canceled due to the 2022 World Cup and will air on November 29 instead.)	4.3% (17th)	4.0% (17th)	N/A
9	December 5, 2022	4.2% (21st)	4.0% (19th)	4.3% (18th)
10	December 6, 2022	5.4% (12th)	5.2% (13th)	4.3% (18th)
11	December 12, 2022	5.5% (12th)	5.4% (13th)	3.9% (17th)
12	December 13, 2022	6.1% (7th)	5.9% (6th)	4.6% (16th)
13	December 19, 2022	4.6% (19th)	5.0% (17th)	N/A
14	December 20, 2022	5.2% (10th)	5.1% (9th)	N/A
15	December 26, 2022	5.3% (14th)	5.1% (14th)	N/A
16	December 27, 2022	5.7% (8th)	5.0% (11th)	N/A
Average		5.2%	5.0%	— (Note: Due to some ratings not recorded, the exact average rating is unknown.)
In the table above, the blue numbers represent the lowest ratings and the red numbers represent the highest ratings.; N/A denotes that the ratings were not known.

== Awards and nominations ==
Award ceremony	Year	Category	Nominee / Work	Result	Ref.
KBS Drama Awards	2022	Top Excellence Award, Actor	Kang Ha-neul	Won	
KBS Drama Awards	2022	Top Excellence Award, Actress	Ha Ji-won	Won	
KBS Drama Awards	2022	Best Supporting Actor	Sung Dong-il	Won	
KBS Drama Awards	2022	Best New Actor	Noh Sang-hyun	Nominated	
KBS Drama Awards	2022	Best New Actress	Jung Ji-so	Won	
KBS Drama Awards	2022	Popularity Award, Actor	Kang Ha-neul	Won	
KBS Drama Awards	2022	Best Couple Award	Kang Ha-neul and Ha Ji-won	Won	
