= Twenty (film) =

- Theatrical release poster
- Hangul: 스물
- RR: Seumul
- MR: Sŭmul
- Directed by: Lee Byeong-heon
- Written by: Lee Byeong-heon
- Produced by: Jeong Hoon-tak
- Starring: Kim Woo-bin; Lee Jun-ho; Kang Ha-neul
- Cinematography: Noh Seung-bo
- Edited by: Nam Na-yeong
- Music by: Kim Tae-seong
- Distributed by: Next Entertainment World
- Release date: March 25, 2015
- Running time: 115 minutes
- Country: South Korea
- Language: Korean
- Box office: US$22.3 million

Twenty (Korean: 스물; RR: Seumul) is a 2015 South Korean coming-of-age comedy-drama film starring Kim Woo-bin, Lee Jun-ho, and Kang Ha-neul. It was written and directed by Lee Byeong-heon, his second feature after the 2012 indie Cheer Up, Mr. Lee.

== Plot ==
Chi-ho, Kyung-jae and Dong-woo are best friends who've just graduated from high school and turned 20. Chi-ho is unemployed struggling to find a job in the meantime and whose top one priority is dating and chasing women. Kyung-jae is a goody-two-shoes university student whose goal is to get accepted at a corporate job; he's extremely shy around girls, but completely transforms when he gets drunk. And happy-go-lucky Dong-woo dreams of becoming a Manhwa artist, but when his family goes bankrupt, he's forced to become the breadwinner and take on several part-time jobs.

== Cast ==
- Kim Woo-bin as Chi-ho
- Lee Jun-ho as Dong-woo
- Kang Ha-neul as Kyung-jae
- Jung So-min as So-min
- Lee Yu-bi as So-hee
- Min Hyo-rin as Jin-joo
- Jung Joo-yeon as Eun-hye
- Kim Eui-sung as Chi-ho's father
- Yang Hyun-min as So-joong
- Choi Chamsarang as Sa-rang
- Ahn Jae-hong as In-gook
- Na In-woo as Dong-won
- Baek Soo-hee as Min-jung
- Song Ye-dam / Song Ye-joon as Twins
- Han Joon-woo as Club DJ
- Heo Joon-seok as Beom-soo
- Jung Yeo-jin as Beom-soo's wife
- Kim Jong-soo as Dong-woo's uncle
- Cha Min-ji as 20 year old woman
- Hong Wan-pyo as Assistant director
- Oh Ha-nee as Make-up team
- Kim Chan-hyeong as Head
- So Hee-jung as Kyung-jae's mother
- Park Myung-shin as Chi-ho's mother
- Park Hyuk-kwon as Film director
- Oh Hyun-kyung as Dong-woo's mother
- Kim Jae-man as Chicken house boss
- Choi Il-gu as News anchor

== Music ==
Two singles were released as the film's "special" soundtrack. Part 1 (released on March 6, 2015) featured a duet by Lee Junho and Lee Yu-bi titled "Cupid's Arrow," and Part 2 (released on March 18, 2015) featured "Twenty" sung by boyband Sweet Sorrow with narration by Kim Woo-bin.

== Release ==
=== South Korea ===
Twenty was released in South Korea on March 25, 2015. It topped the box office in its opening weekend, drawing 1,136,866 viewers and earning ₩8.74 billion (US$7.93 million). As of April 19, 2015, it has grossed US$21.3 million with nearly 3 million admissions.

=== International ===
The film was released by CJ Entertainment America in 25 theaters across North America on April 17, 2015.

It received a theatrical release in other Asian countries such as Japan, Taiwan, Hong Kong, Singapore, Malaysia, and Vietnam.

== Awards and nominations ==
Year	Award	Category	Recipient	Result
2015	51st Baeksang Arts Awards	Best New Director (Film)	Lee Byeong-heon	Nominated
2015	51st Baeksang Arts Awards	Best New Actor (Film)	Kang Ha-neul	Nominated
2015	Korean Film Actors' Guild Awards	Best New Actor	Kang Ha-neul	Won
2015	Korean Film Actors' Guild Awards	Popularity Award	Kim Woo-bin	Won
2015	15th Korea World Youth Film Festival	Favorite New Actor	Kang Ha-neul	Won
2015	24th Buil Film Awards	Best New Actor	Kim Woo-bin	Nominated
2015	52nd Grand Bell Awards	Best New Actor	Kang Ha-neul	Nominated
2015	52nd Grand Bell Awards	Best New Director	Lee Byeong-heon	Nominated
2015	36th Blue Dragon Film Awards	Best New Director	Lee Byeong-heon	Nominated
2015	36th Blue Dragon Film Awards	Best New Actor	Kang Ha-neul	Nominated
2015	36th Blue Dragon Film Awards	Best New Actress	Lee Yu-bi	Nominated
2015	The Korea Film Actors Association Awards	Best New Director Award	Lee Byeong-heon	Won
