= Streaming (2025 film) =

2025 film by Cho Jang-ho

- Theatrical release poster
- Hangul: 스트리밍
- RR: Seuteuriming
- MR: Sŭt'ŭriming
- Directed by: Cho Jang-ho
- Written by: Cho Jang-ho
- Produced by: Jo Seong-geol; Na Hye-young
- Starring: Kang Ha-neul
- Cinematography: Kang Sang-hyun
- Edited by: Heo Sun-mi
- Music by: Lee Jun-oh
- Production company: Very Good Studio
- Distributed by: Lotte Entertainment
- Release date: March 21, 2025
- Running time: 91 minutes
- Country: South Korea
- Language: Korean
- Box office: US$678,192

Streaming (Korean: 스트리밍) is a 2025 South Korean thriller film written and directed by Cho Jang-ho. It stars Kang Ha-neul as a top crime channel streamer who broadcasts in real time as he investigates clues behind an unsolved string of serial murders. The film was released on March 21, 2025.

== Plot ==
The most popular crime channel streamer in Korea, Woo Sang, holds the number one spot in subscribers. On WAG, a fictional streaming platform where only the top-ranked streamer gets all the sponsorship money, Woo Sang rises to fame by analyzing cold cases. But his fall is just as swift when a controversy sends him crashing down.

Determined to reclaim his top position, Woo Sang begins live-streaming his investigation into the infamous hemline serial murders. As he follows the trail of clues, he inches closer to uncovering the killer's identity. But when Woo Sang realizes that the serial killer is watching his stream, the broadcast takes an unexpected and dangerous turn.

== Cast ==
- Kang Ha-neul as Woo Sang
- Ha Seo-yoon as Matilda
- Kang Ha-kyung as Lee Jin-seong
- Ha Hyun-soo as KJ5385
- Kim Ki-doo as Tae-ho

== Production ==
=== Development ===
Director Cho Jang-ho and the crew emphasized realism to recreate the feeling of a true live stream. The production employed numerous long takes, requiring intense coordination between actors and crew. Kang Ha-neul had to memorize large volumes of dialogue and shift emotional states quickly, which director Jo praised as "astonishingly immersive".

The live-chat elements, such as donation sound effects and viewer comments, were carefully integrated into the filming to boost the liveness of the scenes.

=== Filming ===
Principal photography for Streaming began on 2 March 2021 and ended on May.

== Release ==
Streaming premiered in South Korean theaters on 21 March 2025, distributed by Lotte Entertainment. The film was released on digital platforms in South Korea just one month after its theatrical release, on April 22.

=== Box office ===
The film was released on March 21, 2025 on 819 screens. It opened at first place at the South Korean box office with 31,524 admissions.

As of March 25, 2025, the film has grossed US$604,353 from 91,102 admissions.

== Accolades ==
Award	Year	Category	Recipient(s)	Result	Ref.
Baeksang Arts Awards	2025	Best New Actress	Ha Seo-yoon	Nominated	
