= Love Reset =

2023 South Korean romantic comedy film

- Theatrical release poster
- Hangul: 30일
- Hanja: 30日
- Lit.: 30 Days
- RR: 30il
- MR: 30il
- Directed by: Nam Dae-joong
- Written by: Bang Ki-chul; Nam Dae-joong
- Produced by: Chun Seung-chul
- Starring: Kang Ha-neul; Jung So-min
- Cinematography: Shin Tae-ho
- Edited by: Heo Sun-mi; Jo Han-ul
- Music by: Jeong Sang-woo
- Production companies: Woollim Films; TH Story
- Distributed by: Mindmark
- Release date: October 3, 2023
- Running time: 119 minutes
- Country: South Korea
- Language: Korean
- Box office: US$18.4 million

Love Reset (Korean: 30일; lit. 'thirty days') is a 2023 South Korean romantic comedy film directed by Nam Dae-joong. It stars Kang Ha-neul and Jung So-min as a couple suffering from amnesia due to an unexpected accident, 30 days before the end of their marriage. The film was released theatrically on October 3, 2023 and grossed over $18 million worldwide, becoming the sixth highest-grossing South Korean film of 2023.

== Plot ==
After breaking up with his girlfriend of six years, No Jeong-yeol spends the day of her wedding drinking heavily with friends at the bar of his close friend Ki-bae. Persuaded by those around him, Jeong-yeol suddenly storms out, determined to stop her. At the very moment he opens the door to leave, the door swings open and Hong Na-ra, dressed in her wedding gown, rushes in. Na-ra has also fled the ceremony to stop Jeong-yeol. After confirming their feelings for each other, the two manage to get married despite fierce opposition from Na-ra's father.

Years later, however, the couple is now on the brink of divorce. Having grown up in completely different environments, they constantly clash over values whenever they visit each other's families. Matters worsen when suspicions of infidelity spread even into their workplaces, turning them into people who can barely stand each other. Eventually, they go to court and clearly state their intention to divorce, receiving a ruling that mandates a 30-day divorce cooling-off period.

On their way home from the courthouse, still arguing nonstop in the car, a truck suddenly appears and crashes into their vehicle. Thankfully, neither is seriously injured but both suffer from amnesia, absurdly losing only their memories of each other. The hospital director tells both families that maintaining their existing environment would be best for the couple's memory recovery. As a result, during the 30-day cooling-off period, Jeong-yeol and Na-ra end up living together under the watch of Na-ra's younger sister, Hong Na-mi.

In an effort to help them recover, both sets of parents gather the couple's friends to recount their shared memories, and even attempt hypnosis to trigger recollection. Meanwhile, having forgotten not only their love but also all the resentment they once felt, the couple gradually falls in love all over again. Taking the hospital director's advice that sexual stimulation could help restore memory, they even resume a physical relationship.

Eventually, Jeong-yeol's memories return but Na-ra's do not. Deciding she needs time and space, Na-ra decides to go abroad to study. While Jeong-yeol is packing his belongings with friends after her departure, Bo-bae appears and tells him Na-ra's flight departure time before leaving. Determined to stop her, Jeong-yeol rushes to Incheon Airport, delivers the heartfelt speech he prepared, and tries to hold her back. However, Na-ra is wearing earphones and does not hear him. She says goodbye and leaves.

After their separation, as Jeong-yeol stands lost in thought while his friends run off trying to stop their illegally parked car from being towed away, Na-ra suddenly appears again. She explains that although Jeong-yeol's memories have returned, hers have not, and that it feels unfair. She suggests that they live together again until her memories return.

== Cast ==
- Kang Ha-neul as No Jeong-yeol, a lawyer
- Jung So-min as Hong Na-ra, a film producer
- Kim Sun-young as Sook-jeong, Jeong-yeol's mother
- Hwang Se-in as Hong Na-mi, Na-ra's younger sister
- Lim Chul-hyung as Hong Jang-gun, Na-ra's father
- Yoon Kyung-ho as Ki-bae, Jeong-yeol's friend who is a bar owner
- Jo Min-soo as Bo-bae, Na-ra's mother
- Uhm Ji-yoon as Yeong-ji, Na-ra's friend
- Yang Hak-jin as Woo-jung, handsome doctor
- Song Hae-na as Ae-ok, Na-ra's friend
- Shim Woo-sung as ER Doctor

== Production ==
Principal photography began in November 2022 and ended in February 2023.

== Reception ==
=== Box office ===
As of November 27, 2023, the film has grossed US$16,304,526 at the local box office and accumulated 2,162,057 admissions from 1,146 screens.

=== Accolades ===
| Award ceremony | Year | Category | Nominee / Work | Result | Ref. |
|---|---|---|---|---|---|
| Golden Cinematography Awards | 2024 | Best Actress | Jung So-min | Won | |
| Korean Film Producers Association Awards | 2023 | Best Actor | Kang Ha-neul | Won | |
