= Angel Eyes (TV series) =

2014 South Korean television series

- Promotional poster
- Hangul: 엔젤 아이즈
- RR: Enjel aijeu
- MR: Enjel aijŭ
- Genre: Melodrama; Medical; Romance; Family
- Developed by: Choi Moon-suk
- Written by: Yoon Ji-ryun
- Directed by: Park Shin-woo
- Starring: Lee Sang-yoon; Koo Hye-sun
- Music by: Nam Hye-seung
- Country of origin: South Korea
- Original language: Korean
- No. of episodes: 20

Production
- Executive producer: Choi Moon-suk
- Producers: Song Kyung-hwa; Kim Min-tae
- Cinematography: Yoon Dae-young
- Running time: 70 minutes
- Production company: The Story Works

Original release
- Network: SBS TV
- Release: April 5 – June 15, 2014

Angel Eyes (Korean: 엔젤 아이즈) is a 2014 South Korean television series starring Lee Sang-yoon and Koo Hye-sun. It aired on SBS from April 5 to June 15, 2014, on Saturdays and Sundays at 21:55 (KST) for 20 episodes.

== Plot ==
Yoon Soo-wan (Ku Hye-sun) and Park Dong-joo (Lee Sang-yoon) were each other's first loves, but they were forced to separate due to painful family circumstances. Soo-wan, who had been blind, eventually undergoes an eye transplant surgery that restores her sight.

Twelve years later, Soo-wan now works as an emergency rescue worker, while Dong-joo is a surgeon. They meet each other again, but Soo-wan is engaged to a neurosurgeon, Kang Ji-woon (Kim Ji-seok). Knowing this, Park Dong-joo decides to keep quiet and not reveal his identity to Soo-wan, and also decides to go back. Will Soo-wan realize that Doctor Dylan Park is her first love, Park Dong-joo? Will they end up together despite all the obstacles that they are going to face?

== Cast ==
=== Main ===
- Lee Sang-yoon as Park Dong-joo / Dylan Park / Darren Park
  - Kang Ha-neul as teenage Park Dong-joo
  - Jung Jae-min as young Park Dong-joo

A smart and warm-hearted doctor who wants to protect the woman he loves. As a teenager, he was sent to America after his mother's death from a hit-and-run accident.

- Koo Hye-sun as Yoon Soo-wan / Sienna Yoon
  - Nam Ji-hyun as teenage Yoon Soo-wan
  - Roh Jeong-eui as young Yoon Soo-wan

A legally-blind woman who gets her vision back in an operation and decides to embrace life with passion by becoming an emergency rescue worker. Tomboyish Soo-wan still fondly remembers her first love from 12 years ago.

=== Supporting ===
==== Seyoung Hospital ====
- Kim Ji-seok as Kang Ji-woon / Jiro Kang

A thoughtful neurosurgeon who is dating Soo-wan.

- Jung Jin-young as Yoon Jae-bum / Joseph Yoon

Soo-wan's father.

- Jung Ae-ri as Oh Young-ji

- Seyoung Hospital's chairman and doctor.

- Kim Ho-chang as Moon Je-ha
- Seo Dong-won as Kim Ho-jin
- Park Jin-joo as Kim Yoon-jung
- Lee Seung-hyung as Sung Hyun-ho
- Im Seung-dae as Choi Jin-sang

==== Seyoung Fire Station ====
- Gong Hyung-jin as Ki Woon-chan
- Seungri as Teddy Seo

A Korean-American who returns to Korea to become an emergency rescue worker. He speaks Korean with a Chungcheong accent after being raised by his grandmother in the south. Teddy falls in love at first sight with Park Hye-joo.

- Kim Seung-wook as Joo Tae-sub
- Sung Chang-hoon as Park Chang-hyun
- Lee Ha-yool as Kim Jin-soo

==== Seyoung Police Station ====
- Hyun Jyu-ni as Cha Min-soo / Miriam Cha
  - Shin Hye-sun as young Cha Min-soo
- Kwon Hae-hyo as Kim Woo-chul
- Jeon Jin-ki as Kim Young-rak

==== Extended cast ====
- Yoon Ye-joo as Park Hye-joo
  - Choi Ji-won as young Park Hye-joo / Hazel Park
- Shin Young-jin as Han Woo-jung
- Jung Ji-hoon as Ki Jin-mo
- Heo Jung-eun

=== Cameos ===
- Kim Yeo-jin as Yoo Jung-hwa
- Seo Tae-hwa as Park Hyung-shik
- Yoo Jae-myung as Seon-woo
- Jung Hae-kyun as the owner of the house Soo Wan lives in (Ep.19–20)

== Ratings ==
Ep.	Original broadcast date	Average audience share			
Ep.	Original broadcast date	TNmS Ratings		AGB Nielsen	
Ep.	Original broadcast date	Nationwide	Seoul National Capital Area	Nationwide	Seoul National Capital Area
1	5 April 2014	7.3%	8.4%	6.3%	6.9%
2	April 6, 2014	7.5%	8.3%	6.6%	7.6%
3	April 12, 2014	8.9%	10.2%	8.8%	9.7%
4	April 13, 2014	7.9%	9.7%	8.0%	8.3%
5	April 26, 2014	10.2%	12.4%	10.8%	12.1%
6	April 27, 2014	11.1%	13.5%	11.9%	13.4%
7	May 3, 2014	10.2%	11.8%	10.4%	12.1%
8	May 4, 2014	10.4%	12.3%	10.3%	11.6%
9	May 10, 2014	10.9%	12.1%	9.9%	11.1%
10	May 11, 2014	11.1%	14.0%	10.4%	12.0%
11	May 17, 2014	10.4%	12.1%	8.7%	9.3%
12	May 18, 2014	9.8%	11.4%	9.6%	10.7%
13	May 24, 2014	9.1%	10.6%	9.1%	10.0%
14	May 25, 2014	8.6%	10.1%	9.2%	10.7%
15	May 31, 2014	8.7%	10.7%	9.2%	10.5%
16	June 1, 2014	7.6%	8.2%	8.1%	9.6%
17	June 7, 2014	8.7%	10.0%	8.0%	8.4%
18	June 8, 2014	8.7%	9.8%	8.7%	9.8%
19	June 14, 2014	8.9%	11.0%	8.6%	10.0%
20	June 15, 2014	9.1%	10.7%	8.9%	10.5%
Average		9.3%	10.9%	9.1%	10.2%

== Awards and nominations ==
Year	Award	Category	Recipient	Result
2014	SBS Drama Awards	Excellence Award, Actress in a Drama Special	Ku Hye-sun	Nominated
2014	SBS Drama Awards	Excellence Award, Actor in a Drama Special	Lee Sang-yoon	Nominated
2014	SBS Drama Awards	Special Award, Actor in a Drama Special	Kim Ji-seok	Nominated
2014	SBS Drama Awards	New Star Award	Kang Ha-neul	Won
2014	SBS Drama Awards	Best Couple Award	Lee Sang-yoon and Ku Hye-sun	Nominated
