= Wall to Wall (film) =

2025 film by Kim Tae-joon

- Release poster
- Hangul: 84제곱미터
- Lit.: 84 Square Meters
- RR: 84jegommiteo
- MR: 84chegommit'ŏ
- Directed by: Kim Tae-joon
- Written by: Kim Tae-joon
- Produced by: Seo Jong-hae
- Starring: Kang Ha-neul; Yeom Hye-ran; Seo Hyun-woo
- Cinematography: Jeong Gui-ho
- Edited by: Shin Min-kyung
- Music by: Heo Jun-hyuk
- Production company: Mizi Film
- Distributed by: Netflix
- Release date: July 18, 2025
- Running time: 118 minutes
- Country: South Korea
- Language: Korean

Wall to Wall (Korean: 84제곱미터) is a 2025 South Korean mystery thriller film written and directed by Kim Tae-joon. Produced under Mizi Film, it stars Kang Ha-neul, Yeom Hye-ran, and Seo Hyun-woo. The film was released on Netflix on July 18, 2025.

== Plot ==
In April 2021, Noh Woo-sung purchases an 84 m^{2} (900 sq ft) apartment in Seoul for 1.1 billion won. He begins a happy life there with his fiancée, but by August 2024, the apartment's value has crashed to the 800 million range. The financial strain leads to a broken engagement. Woo-sung, burdened with more than 700 million won in loans, juggles a day job and nighttime delivery work to make ends meet. One morning, Woo-sung is awakened by an unexplained alarm and encounters Joo-kyung, a resident of apartment 1301, leaving a note on his door complaining about noise between floors. Although Woo-sung insists that he has made no noise, Joo-kyung behaves erratically and accuses him of causing the disturbance. After investigating several floors, Woo-sung eventually speaks with Eun-hwa, the representative of the residents, who suggests that the problem is coming from unit 1301 and asks him to endure the situation for the time being.

At work, Woo-sung learns from a friend about inside information concerning GB Coin, a cryptocurrency allegedly destined for a dramatic rise at a specific time. Desperate for money, he sells his apartment at a heavily discounted price and uses the deposit to invest in the coin. The plan initially succeeds, and Woo-sung watches its value rise rapidly, believing that his financial troubles are finally over. However, the residents soon accuse him of being the source of the mysterious noise. When they inspect his apartment, they discover a subwoofer hidden inside, and Woo-sung is arrested after Joo-kyung's husband Gwang-cheol appears to injure himself during a confrontation and frames Woo-sung for assault. While being questioned at the police station, Woo-sung desperately attempts to access a computer and sell his cryptocurrency before the planned deadline. Despite being repeatedly restrained, shocked with a Taser, and struck by police, he manages to reach the computer and press the sell button. The transaction ultimately fails, however, and Woo-sung loses his entire investment.

Devastated, Woo-sung prepares to kill himself, but notices the strange noise and flickering lights coming from apartment 1301. He is confronted by Jin-ho, another resident who had previously complained about the noise, but the two eventually realize that Woo-sung is not responsible. Suspicious of Eun-hwa, they investigate her activities, only for Woo-sung to discover that a smartphone connected to the subwoofer is receiving a Wi-Fi signal apparently originating from Jin-ho's apartment. After secretly switching apartment keys with Jin-ho, Woo-sung infiltrates his home and discovers an enormous sound system, detailed information on all of the residents, and equipment capable of remotely controlling the building's intercoms and entrances. It is revealed that Jin-ho is the true source of the noise. He is an investigative journalist who has been secretly documenting corruption, and he deliberately targeted Woo-sung as a scapegoat in order to expose corruption related to the apartment's defective construction.

Woo-sung hides in Jin-ho's apartment and attempts to kill him, but is interrupted by Joo-kyung, who arrives at the apartment. It is revealed that Joo-kyung and Gwang-cheol had staged the earlier incident in cooperation with Jin-ho. After Gwang-cheol remains unconscious, however, Joo-kyung turns against Jin-ho and attempts to destroy his evidence, prompting Jin-ho to kill her. Jin-ho subsequently reveals that Eun-hwa has been concealing the building's construction defects and embezzling money, and that he intends to obtain a ledger containing decisive evidence against her. Threatened by Jin-ho, Woo-sung agrees to cooperate with him, and the two infiltrate Eun-hwa's penthouse. After subduing Eun-hwa and her husband Ju-ho, they enter a locked room using Ju-ho's fingerprint. Eun-hwa then persuades Woo-sung to turn against Jin-ho, but her attempt to have him killed fails. Jin-ho fatally attacks Ju-ho, while Eun-hwa shoots Jin-ho with a gas gun and orders Woo-sung to finish him off. Jin-ho collapses, apparently dead, allowing Eun-hwa to relax and inadvertently reveal the location of the ledger. Jin-ho, who has only been pretending to be incapacitated, then kills Eun-hwa.

Woo-sung refuses to give Jin-ho the ledger and instead decides to destroy all the evidence. He opens a gas valve connected to a severed gas line and turns on the oven, setting fire to his apartment-sale documents, the ledger, and the other evidence gathered that night. He escapes the building shortly before it explodes, while the weakened Jin-ho is killed in the blast. Woo-sung survives but loses consciousness. After awakening in a hospital, he is interviewed by the prosecutor investigating the incident and realizes bitterly that his actions have destroyed the evidence needed to expose the corruption. He later returns to his hometown, but abruptly awakens from sleep after dreaming of his apartment documents burning. Returning to Seoul, Woo-sung quietly examines the registration documents for his apartment. When another unexplained noise begins somewhere in the building, he suddenly starts laughing uncontrollably.

== Cast ==
- Kang Ha-neul as Noh Woo-sung, unit 1401
- Yeom Hye-ran as Jeon Eun-hwa, penthouse (PH)
- Seo Hyun-woo as Young Jin-ho, unit 1501
- Jeon Jin-oh as Jeon Gwang-cheol, unit 1301
- Kim Hyun-jung as Ha Joo-kyung, unit 1301
- Park Sung-il as Ga Ju-ho, Eun-hwa's husband
- Kang Ae-shim as Nam Hae-ju, Woo-sung's mother
- Jung Sung-il as Prosecutor

== Production ==
=== Development ===
Wall to Wall was written and directed by Kim Tae-joon who directed Unlocked (2023), while Mizi Film managed the production of the film.

=== Casting ===
In 2024, Kang Ha-neul, Yeom Hye-ran, and Seo Hyun-woo were reportedly cast in the film.

=== Filming ===
Principal photography of the film commenced in June 2024, and filming ended in September of the same year.

== Release ==
The film was made available to stream exclusively on Netflix on July 18, 2025.

== Reception ==
James Marsh of South China Morning Post gave it a rating of 3/5, describing it as "a marked improvement" over director Kim Tae-joon's previous work Unlocked (2023). JK Sooja of Common Sense Media awarded the film 2/5 stars.
