= When the Camellia Blooms =

2019 South Korean television series

- Promotional poster
- Hangul: 동백꽃 필 무렵
- RR: Dongbaekkkot pil muryeop
- MR: Tongbaekkot p'il muryŏp
- Genre: Romantic comedy; Thriller
- Written by: Lim Sang-choon
- Directed by: Cha Yeong-hoon
- Starring: Gong Hyo-jin; Kang Ha-neul; Kim Ji-seok; Ji Yi-soo; Oh Jung-se; Yeom Hye-ran; Son Dam-bi; Kim Kang-hoon
- Country of origin: South Korea
- Original language: Korean
- No. of episodes: 40 (Note: In order to circumvent Korean laws that prevent commercial breaks in the middle of an episode, what would previously have been aired as single 70 minute episodes are now being repackaged as two 35 minute episodes, with two episodes being shown each night with a commercial break between the two.) + 4 special episodes

Production
- Producer: Kim Hie-yeol
- Camera setup: Single-camera
- Running time: 35 minutes
- Production company: Pan Entertainment

Original release
- Network: KBS2
- Release: September 18 – November 21, 2019

When the Camellia Blooms (Korean: 동백꽃 필 무렵) is a 2019 South Korean television series starring Gong Hyo-jin and Kang Ha-neul. It aired on KBS2's Wednesdays and Thursdays at 22:00 (KST) from September 18 to November 21, 2019. Each episode was released on Netflix in South Korea and most Asia-Pacific and English speaking countries after their television broadcast. (Note: For Japan, all episodes were launched at once on November 15, while for the rest of the world it was launched weekly from September 28.)

When the Camellia Blooms became the highest rated mini-series drama airing in 2019 with a single episode rating of 23.8%. According to Nielsen Korea, the drama also became the second highest rated drama of 2019 with all episodes' average ratings of 14.83% behind SBS's The Fiery Priest. The series was met with praise by critics and audiences for its production and solid actors' performances. It also received favourable reviews for its realistic plot and unique genre combinations of romantic-comedy and thriller.

When the Camellia Blooms received 10 nominations at the 56th Baeksang Arts Awards, winning 4 – Grand Prize for Television, Best Screenplay, Best Actor for Kang Ha-neul and Best Supporting Actor for Oh Jung-se, and won multiple awards at 2019 KBS Drama Awards including Grand Prize for Gong Hyo-jin.

== Synopsis ==
When the Camellia Blooms is the story of Oh Dong-baek (Gong Hyo-jin), a single mother who moves to the fictional town of Ongsan and opens a bar named Camellia. Dong-baek faces many challenges and meets a variety of colourful characters as she attempts to settle down in the small town. Six years later, Dong-baek meets playful Yong-sik (Kang Ha-neul), a justice seeking police officer who declares his love for her. Meanwhile, a notorious killer sets out to claim Dong-baek as his next victim. Yong-sik balances his attempts to woo Dong-baek who does her best as a single working mother, while also discovering the killer's identity.

== Cast ==
=== Main ===
- Gong Hyo-jin as Oh Dong-baek

A single mother who runs a bar called "Camellia" in Ongsan. She is the mother of Pil-gu and ex-girlfriend to Jong-ryul. Although initially she does not reciprocate Yong-sik's feelings, she eventually grows to like him the more he spends time with her and her son.

- Kang Ha-neul as Hwang Yong-sik

A police officer with a strong instinct for finding and beating up criminals. He moves back to his hometown Ongsan after being demoted and there he meets and falls for Dong-baek. He vows to always be on her side and protect both her and her son, even at his mother's disapproval. He becomes focused on catching the serial killer known as "Joker" after Dong-baek becomes his next target.

- Kim Ji-seok as Kang Jong-ryul

A famous baseball player and ex-boyfriend to Dong-baek. He is shown to be continuously self-centered and jealous of Yong-sik's relationship with Dong-baek and Pil-gu.

- Ji Yi-soo as Jessica / Park Sang-mi

Wife to Jong-ryul she's insecure and mainly focuses on trying to be a social media icon. She is mostly neglectful of her daughter and takes advantage of her relationship with Jong-ryul for fame.

- Oh Jung-se as No Gyu-tae

Dong-baek's landlord, who repeatedly hits on her. He is unhappily married to Ja-young.

- Yeom Hye-ran as Hong Ja-young

A very intelligent lawyer and wife to Gyu-tae. She often talks down to her husband because of his incompetency.

- Son Dam-bi as Choi Hyang-mi / Choi Go-woon

A part time employee at Camellia and Dong-baek's friend. She is a kleptomaniac. She often talks about moving to Copenhagen and is always looking for ways to gain enough money, leading her to blackmail others. She died before the first episode and the series goes through flashbacks.

- Kim Kang-hoon as Kang Pil-gu

Dong-baek's 8-year-old son, who plays baseball and is very protective of his mother.

- Go Doo-shim as Kwak Deok-soon

Yong-sik's widowed mother who runs a marinated crab restaurant in Ongsan.

- Jeon Bae-soo as Byun Bae-soo

The chief police in Ongsan and Yong-sik's superior.

- Lee Jung-eun as Jo Jung-sook

Dong-baek's mother who abandoned her as a child.

=== Supporting ===
==== Ongsan Crab Alley ====
- Kim Sun-young as Park Chan-sook
- Kim Dong-hyeon as Song Jin-bae
- Kim Mi-hwa as Kim Jae-yeong
- Lee Seon-hee as Jeong Gwi-ryeon
- Han Ye-joo as Jo Ae-jeong
- Lee Sang-yi as Yang Seung-yeop
- Kim Mo-ah as Yang Seung-hee
- Baek Hyun-joo as Oh Ji-hyeon
- Lee Joong-yeol as Han Tae-hee
- Jin Yong-wook as Choi Jong-rok
- Lee Kyu-sung as Park Heung-sik
- Carson Allen as Helena

==== Ongsan Police ====
- Lee Jae-woo as Kwon Oh-joon
- Park Yeon-woo as Park Seong-min

==== Others ====
- Hwang Young-hee as Lee Hwa-ja
- Baek Eun-hye as Sung-hee
- Lee Jin-hee as Geum-ok
- Yoo Yeon as Lee Ji-ho
- Jeon Guk-hyang as Hong Eun-sil
- Kim Geon as Song Joon-gi
- Yoon Seong-woo as Soo-bong
- Seo Jang-hyeon as Dae-seong
- Kim Dae-gon as Shaman performing funeral
- Jang Ye-rim as restaurant employee
- Jeong Eun-jeong as waitress
- Park Bo-eun as staff
- Kyeong Gi-hyeon as staff
- Kim Han-na as Hye-in
- Kang Tae-woong as Number 7
- Kwon Eun-seong as Hye-hoon
- Jeon Eun-mi as co-op member
- Hong Seo-joon as Jeong Chan-geol
- Kim Gi-cheon as Park Man-seop

=== Special appearances ===
- Choi Dae-chul as Hwang Kyu-sik, Yong-sik's eldest brother (Ep. 26)
- In Gyo-jin as Hwang Doo-sik, Yong-sik's second brother (Ep. 26)
- Jung Ga-ram as adult Pil-gu (Ep. 36, 40)

== Original soundtrack ==
When the Camellia Blooms OST

Soundtrack album by Various artists
- Released: 2019
- Genre: Soundtrack
- Languages: Korean; English
- Labels: Pan Entertainment; Most Content

=== Part 1 ===
Released on October 3, 2019
No.	Title	Singer	Length
1.	"Foolish Love" (이상한 사람)	John Park	3:45
2.	"Foolish Love" (Inst.)		3:45

=== Part 2 ===
Released on October 9, 2019
No.	Title	Singer	Length
1.	"Loser"	O.WHEN	4:04
2.	"Loser" (Inst.)		4:04

=== Part 3 ===
Released on October 10, 2019
No.	Title	Singer	Length
1.	"You Are My Vitamin" (너는 내게 비타민 같아)	Motte (ft. Yongzoo)	3:59
2.	"You Are My Vitamin" (Inst.)		3:59

=== Part 4 ===
Released on October 16, 2019
No.	Title	Singer	Length
1.	"You Are As Pretty As A Flower" (꽃처럼 예쁜 그대)	Onestar	3:41
2.	"You Are As Pretty As A Flower" (Inst.)		3:41

=== Part 5 ===
Released on October 23, 2019
No.	Title	Singer	Length
1.	"Good To Be With You" (괜찮나요)	Soyou	4:20
2.	"Good To Be With You" (Inst.)		4:20

=== Part 6 ===
Released on October 31, 2019
No.	Title	Singer	Length
1.	"Like A Heroine In The Movie" (영화 속에 나오는 주인공처럼)	Punch	3:55
2.	"Like A Heroine In The Movie" (Inst.)		3:55

=== Part 7 ===
Released on November 6, 2019
No.	Title	Singer	Length
1.	"At That Time" (그 무렵)	Kim Na-young	4:33
2.	"At That Time" (Inst.)		4:33

=== Part 8 ===
Released on November 7, 2019
No.	Title	Singer	Length
1.	"When Winter Comes" (겨울이 오면)	Kim Feel	4:19
2.	"When Winter Comes" (Inst.)		4:19

=== Part 9 ===
Released on November 13, 2019
No.	Title	Singer	Length
1.	"Destiny Tells Me" (운명이 내게 말해요)	Heize	3:12
2.	"Destiny Tells Me" (Inst.)		3:12

=== Part 10 ===
Released on November 14, 2019
No.	Title	Singer	Length
1.	"I'll Be With You"	Ga Eun	3:36
2.	"I'll Be With You" (Inst.)		3:36

=== Part 11 ===
Released on November 20, 2019
No.	Title	Singer	Length
1.	"Mom" (내 맘)	Kim Yeon-ji	3:15
2.	"Mom" (Inst.)		3:15

=== Special OST ===
Released on December 1, 2019
No.	Title	Singer	Length
1.	"The First Noel" (노엘)	Kim Yeon-ji, Onestar, Yongzoo, Ga Eun, Ra.L, Lim Ji Eun, James Kang, Samma Choir	6:19
2.	"The First Noel" (Inst.)		6:19

=== Pop OST ===
No.	Title	Singer	Length
1.	"Wrong Ideology"	Kae Mi	2:20
2.	"Omg"	Park Jeong Hwan	2:02
3.	"Why Are You Looking At Me Like That?"	Yoo Min Ho	2:10
4.	"Bloom"	Lee Geon Yeong	3:08
5.	"Ong-san, Spring"	Park Mi Seon	1:44
6.	"Tiki Tiki"	Park Yun Seo	2:15
7.	"Rash"	Lee Seong Gu	2:06
8.	"Gustalas"	Ra.L	2:13
9.	"Righteous Yongsik"	Yoo Min Ho	1:39
10.	"Smell Like Something Fishy"	Park Jeong Hwan	1:46
11.	"Sleepyhead"	Lee Geon Yeong	2:11
12.	"Don't Stop Mess"	Ra.L	2:02
13.	"I Mean, It's Almost"	Park Mi Seon	1:36
14.	"What's wrong with you, Hyangmi?"	Kae Mi	1:46
15.	"Jayeong"	Park Mi Seon	2:51
16.	"Good Old Days"	Park Jeong Hwan	2:02
17.	"Dongbaek and Yongsik"	Park Mi Seon	1:34
18.	"Divorce Lawyer"	Yoo Min Ho	2:03
19.	"Camellia"	Yoo Min Ho	4:55
20.	"Dazzling"	Lee Geon Yeong	4:07
21.	"Mom, My Mom"	Kae Mi	3:00
22.	"Shadow"	Lee Seong Gu	1:29
23.	"Hillside"	Lee Geon Yeong	4:16
24.	"Why Tiptoeing Around"	Park Yun Seo	2:58
25.	"Don't Mess With Me"	Park Yun Seo	3:41
26.	"I said, Don't mess with me"	Park Yun Seo	3:12
27.	"Neighbor"	Lee Seong Gu	1:22
28.	"When the Camellia Blooms"	Kae Mi	1:50

=== Chart performance ===
Title	Year	Peak positions	Remarks	Ref.
Title	Year	KOR	Remarks	Ref.
"Like A Heroine In The Movie" (영화 속에 나오는 주인공처럼) (Punch)	2019	55	Part 6	

== Viewership ==
When the Camellia Blooms : South Korea viewers per episode (millions)

Episodes	Episode number									
Episodes	1	2	3	4	5	6	7	8	9	10
1–10	1.019	1.271	1.112	1.377	1.453	1.662	1.228	1.629	1.597	2.033
11–20	1.782	2.290	2.054	2.415	1.900	2.561	1.943	2.378	2.198	2.713
21–30	2.360	3.156	2.386	2.960	2.651	3.179	2.722	3.376	2.774	3.383
31–40	2.852	3.511	3.410	3.940	2.564	3.305	3.445	3.944	3.670	4.491

Source: Audience measurement performed nationwide by Nielsen Media Research.

Average TV viewership ratings
Ep.	Original broadcast date	Title	Average audience share		
Ep.	Original broadcast date	Title	AGB Nielsen		TNmS
Ep.	Original broadcast date	Title	Nationwide	Seoul	Nationwide
1	September 18, 2019	The Woman with the Germanium Bracelet	6.3% (11th)	6.7% (8th)	7.4%
2	September 18, 2019	The Woman with the Germanium Bracelet	7.4% (6th)	7.6% (7th)	8.7%
3	September 19, 2019	The Good, the Bad, and the Cheap	6.7% (9th)	7.0% (8th)	6.4%
4	September 19, 2019	The Good, the Bad, and the Cheap	8.3% (6th)	8.7% (5th)	7.9%
5	September 25, 2019	The Mutt's Strategy	8.6% (7th)	9.4% (5th)	7.5%
6	September 25, 2019	The Mutt's Strategy	10.0% (4th)	11.0% (3rd)	8.7%
7	September 26, 2019	The Country Boy	7.7% (8th)	7.4% (7th)	7.5%
8	September 26, 2019	The Country Boy	10.0% (5th)	10.0% (4th)	9.2%
9	October 2, 2019	A Wish, an Affair, and Turmoil	9.3% (7th)	10.1% (3rd)	8.4%
10	October 2, 2019	A Wish, an Affair, and Turmoil	11.5% (2nd)	12.4% (2nd)	9.3%
11	October 3, 2019	1986.08.29. Born to Be a Hippo	10.2% (5th)	10.6% (5th)	—N/a
12	October 3, 2019	1986.08.29. Born to Be a Hippo	12.9% (4th)	13.7% (3rd)	—N/a
13	October 9, 2019	The Ongsan Fairy	11.0% (5th)	12.5% (4th)	9.4%
14	October 9, 2019	The Ongsan Fairy	13.1% (2nd)	14.9% (2nd)	11.0%
15	October 10, 2019	The Lynx of This Area	11.0% (4th)	11.6% (4th)	10.7%
16	October 10, 2019	The Lynx of This Area	14.5% (3rd)	15.2% (2nd)	12.9%
17	October 16, 2019	I Will Welcome Everyone	11.0% (5th)	11.8% (4th)	10.2%
18	October 16, 2019	I Will Welcome Everyone	13.4% (3rd)	14.7% (2nd)	11.5%
19	October 17, 2019	Nice People Can't Get Lucky	12.1% (5th)	13.3% (3rd)	10.0%
20	October 17, 2019	Nice People Can't Get Lucky	14.9% (2nd)	16.1% (2nd)	12.8%
21	October 23, 2019	The Hero Appears at the Last Minute	12.9% (4th)	13.3% (3rd)	10.3%
22	October 23, 2019	The Hero Appears at the Last Minute	16.9% (2nd)	17.5% (2nd)	14.0%
23	October 24, 2019	Don't Forget Me	13.3% (4th)	13.3% (3rd)	12.7%
24	October 24, 2019	Don't Forget Me	16.2% (2nd)	16.1% (2nd)	15.1%
25	October 30, 2019	The End Of All The Flirting	14.3% (2nd)	15.3% (2nd)	12.8%
26	October 30, 2019	The End Of All The Flirting	16.9% (1st)	17.9% (1st)	14.9%
27	October 31, 2019	My Mom's Age Lines "And That Is How My Mom Aged"	15.0% (3rd)	15.5% (2nd)	14.3%
28	October 31, 2019	My Mom's Age Lines "And That Is How My Mom Aged"	18.4% (1st)	18.8% (1st)	16.9%
29	November 6, 2019	Mother	15.2% (2nd)	15.5% (2nd)	14.1%
30	November 6, 2019	Mother	18.2% (1st)	18.7% (1st)	16.0%
31	November 7, 2019	Switching Offense and Defense (Feat. One Who Steps On the Accelerator)	15.7% (2nd)	16.5% (2nd)	14.1%
32	November 7, 2019	Switching Offense and Defense (Feat. One Who Steps On the Accelerator)	18.8% (1st)	19.7% (1st)	17.0%
33	November 13, 2019	The Ongsan Avengers	17.9% (2nd)	18.8% (2nd)	14.5%
34	November 13, 2019	The Ongsan Avengers	20.7% (1st)	22.1% (1st)	16.3%
35	November 14, 2019	Life of an 8-year-old	14.0% (3rd)	14.6% (3rd)	13.4%
36	November 14, 2019	Life of an 8-year-old	18.1% (1st)	19.3% (1st)	16.7%
37	November 20, 2019	7 Years and 3 Months of Motherhood	18.1% (2nd)	18.6% (2nd)	16.1%
38	November 20, 2019	7 Years and 3 Months of Motherhood	20.4% (1st)	21.2% (1st)	19.1%
39	November 21, 2019	Do Miracles Happen?	19.7% (2nd)	20.8% (2nd)	16.6%
40	November 21, 2019	Do Miracles Happen?	23.8% (1st)	24.9% (1st)	19.8%
Average			13.9%	14.6%	— (Note: Due to some ratings not recorded, the exact average rating is unknown.)
Special Episodes
1	November 27, 2019	The Camellia Has Bloomed	8.8% (8th)	8.8% (7th)	9.1%
2	November 27, 2019	The Camellia Has Bloomed	9.1% (7th)	9.4% (6th)	9.0%
3	November 28, 2019	The Camellia Has Bloomed	6.6% (12th)	7.0% (11th)	7.5%
4	November 28, 2019	The Camellia Has Bloomed	7.6% (9th)	8.1% (6th)	8.2%
In this table, the blue numbers represent the lowest ratings and the red numbers represent the highest ratings.; N/A denotes that the rating is not known.; Each night's broadcast is divided into two 35-minute episodes with a commercial break in between.

== Awards and nominations ==
Year	Award	Category	Recipient	Result	Ref
2019	13th Korean Media Awards	Best TV Show on Digital Terrestrial Television	When the Camellia Blooms	Won	
2019	2019 KBS Drama Awards	Grand Prize (Daesang)	Gong Hyo-jin	Won	
2019	2019 KBS Drama Awards	Top Excellence Award, Actor	Kang Ha-neul	Won	
2019	2019 KBS Drama Awards	Top Excellence Award, Actress	Go Doo-shim	Nominated	
2019	2019 KBS Drama Awards	Top Excellence Award, Actress	Gong Hyo-jin	Nominated	
2019	2019 KBS Drama Awards	Excellence Award, Actor in a Mid-length Drama	Kang Ha-neul	Nominated	
2019	2019 KBS Drama Awards	Excellence Award, Actor in a Mid-length Drama	Kim Ji-suk	Won	
2019	2019 KBS Drama Awards	Excellence Award, Actress in a Mid-length Drama	Go Doo-shim	Nominated	
2019	2019 KBS Drama Awards	Excellence Award, Actress in a Mid-length Drama	Gong Hyo-jin	Nominated	
2019	2019 KBS Drama Awards	Excellence Award, Actress in a Mid-length Drama	Lee Jung-eun	Won	
2019	2019 KBS Drama Awards	Best Supporting Actor	Jeon Bae-soo	Nominated	
2019	2019 KBS Drama Awards	Best Supporting Actor	Oh Jung-se	Won	
2019	2019 KBS Drama Awards	Best Supporting Actress	Kim Sun-young	Nominated	
2019	2019 KBS Drama Awards	Best Supporting Actress	Yeom Hye-ran	Won	
2019	2019 KBS Drama Awards	Best Child Actor	Kim Kang-hoon	Won	
2019	2019 KBS Drama Awards	Best Child Actress	Kim Dan-woo	Nominated	
2019	2019 KBS Drama Awards	Best Child Actress	Seo Yi-soo	Nominated	
2019	2019 KBS Drama Awards	Best New Actress	Son Dam-bi	Won	
2019	2019 KBS Drama Awards	Netizen Award, Actor	Kang Ha-neul	Won	
2019	2019 KBS Drama Awards	Netizen Award, Actor	Kim Ji-seok	Nominated	
2019	2019 KBS Drama Awards	Netizen Award, Actor	Oh Jung-se	Nominated	
2019	2019 KBS Drama Awards	Netizen Award, Actress	Gong Hyo-jin	Nominated	
2019	2019 KBS Drama Awards	Netizen Award, Actress	Lee Jung-eun	Nominated	
2019	2019 KBS Drama Awards	Netizen Award, Actress	Son Dam-bi	Nominated	
2019	2019 KBS Drama Awards	Best Couple Award	Gong Hyo-jin and Kang Ha-neul	Won	
2019	2019 KBS Drama Awards	Best Couple Award	Oh Jung-se and Yeom Hye-ran	Won	
2019	2019 KBS Drama Awards	Best Couple Award	Kim Ji-seok and Kim Kang-hoon	Nominated	
2019	2019 KBS Drama Awards	Best Writer	Lim Sang-choon	Won	
2020	32nd Korea Producer Awards	Best Drama	When the Camellia Blooms	Won	
2020	56th Baeksang Arts Awards	Grand Prize (Daesang)	When the Camellia Blooms	Won	
2020	56th Baeksang Arts Awards	Best Drama	When the Camellia Blooms	Nominated	
2020	56th Baeksang Arts Awards	Best Director	Cha Yeong-hoon	Nominated	
2020	56th Baeksang Arts Awards	Best Screenplay	Lim Sang-choon	Won	
2020	56th Baeksang Arts Awards	Best Actor	Kang Ha-neul	Won	
2020	56th Baeksang Arts Awards	Best Actress	Gong Hyo-jin	Nominated	
2020	56th Baeksang Arts Awards	Best Supporting Actor	Oh Jung-se	Won	
2020	56th Baeksang Arts Awards	Best Supporting Actress	Son Dam-bi	Nominated	
2020	56th Baeksang Arts Awards	Best Supporting Actress	Yeom Hye-ran	Nominated	
2020	56th Baeksang Arts Awards	Best New Actor	Kim Kang-hoon	Nominated	
2020	47th Korea Broadcasting Awards	Best TV Drama	When the Camellia Blooms	Won	
2020	47th Korea Broadcasting Awards	Best Screenwriter	Lim Sang-choon	Won	
2020	47th Korea Broadcasting Awards	Best Actor	Kang Ha-neul	Won	
2020	15th Seoul International Drama Awards	Best Mini-Series	When the Camellia Blooms	Nominated	
2020	15th Seoul International Drama Awards	Top Excellence Award for Korean Drama	When the Camellia Blooms	Won	
2020	15th Seoul International Drama Awards	Best Screenwriter	Lim Sang-choon	Won	
2020	15th Seoul International Drama Awards	Best Actor	Kang Ha-neul	Nominated	
2020	15th Seoul International Drama Awards	Outstanding Korean Actor	Kang Ha-neul	Won	
2020	15th Seoul International Drama Awards	Best Actress	Gong Hyo-jin	Won	
2020	15th Seoul International Drama Awards	Outstanding Korean Drama OST	Punch (Like a Heroine in the Movie)	Won	
2020	2nd Asia Contents Awards	Best Asian Drama	When The Camellia Blooms	Won	
2020	2nd Asia Contents Awards	Best Actor	Kang Ha-neul	Nominated	
2021	7th APAN Star Awards	Grand Prize (Daesang)	Gong Hyo-jin	Nominated	
2021	7th APAN Star Awards	Top Excellence Award, Actor in Miniseries	Kang Ha-neul	Won	
2021	7th APAN Star Awards	Drama of the Year	When The Camellia Blooms	Nominated	
2021	7th APAN Star Awards	Best Director	Cha Young-hoon	Won	
2021	7th APAN Star Awards	Best Supporting Actress	Lee Jung-eun	Nominated	
2021	7th APAN Star Awards	Best Supporting Actress	Yeom Hye-ran	Nominated	
2021	7th APAN Star Awards	Best Supporting Actress	Son Dam-bi	Nominated	
2021	7th APAN Star Awards	Popular Star Award, Actor	Kang Ha-neul	Nominated	
2021	7th APAN Star Awards	Popular Star Award, Actress	Gong Hyo-jin	Nominated	

=== Listicles ===
Name of publisher, year listed, name of listicle, recipient and placement
Publisher	Year	Listicle	Recipient	Placement	Ref.
Gallup Korea	2024	Best Television Couple of the Past 10 Years	Gong Hyo-jin and Kang Ha-neul	7th	
