= List of awards and nominations received by Yeom Hye-ran =

Yeom Hye-ran awards and nominations
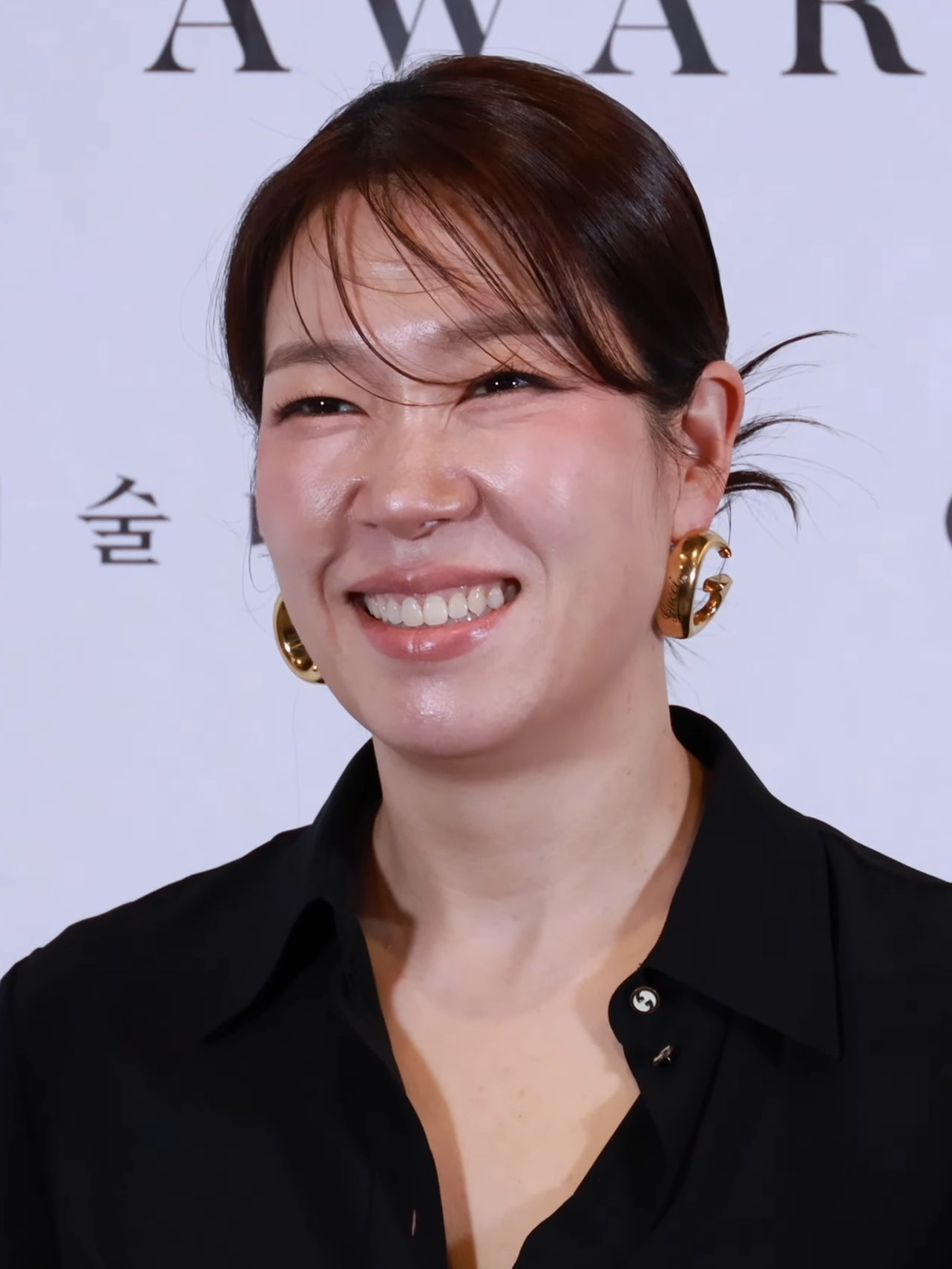
- Yeom in April 2024
Awards and nominations
Award	Wins	Nominations
APAN Star Awards	0	1
Asian Academy Creative Awards	1	1
Asia Contents Awards & Global OTT Awards	2	2
Baeksang Arts Awards	3	9
Beautiful Awards	1	1
Bechdel Day	1	1
Blue Dragon Film Awards	0	1
Blue Dragon Series Awards	1	2
Buil Film Awards	1	2
Chunsa Film Art Awards	1	1
Director's Cut Awards	2	2
DongA Theater Award	1	1
Dong-A.com's Pick	1	1
Golden Cinematography Awards	1	1
Hi-seo Theater Award	1	1
Jeonju International Film Festival	1	1
KBS Drama Awards	2	2
Korea Culture Entertainment Awards	1	1
Korea First Brand Awards	1	1
Seoul Festival Theater Award	1	1
Seoul International Drama Awards	1	1
Wildflower Film Awards	1	1

Totals (Note: Certain award groups do not simply award one winner. They acknowledge several different recipients, have runners-up, and have third place. Since this is a specific recognition and is different from losing an award, runner-up mentions are considered wins in this award tally. For simplification and to avoid errors, each award in this list has been presumed to have had a prior nomination.)
- Wins: 25
- Nominations: 35

South Korean film, television, and theater actress, Yeom Hye-ran, has received many awards and 32 nominations. Her accolades have been bestowed by major award ceremonies, including the Baeksang Arts Awards, where she has won three Baeksang Arts Award for Best Supporting Actress – Television and received six nominations in both television and film categories. She also has won in other award ceremonies, including the Blue Dragon Film Awards, Buil Film Awards, and KBS Drama Awards.

Her career in theater was marked by early recognition, beginning with the Best New Actress Award at the 2004 Beautiful Award and followed by further honors, including the Best New Actress Award at the 2006 Dong-A Theater Awards, the Best Actress Award at the 2009 Hi-seo Theater Award, and the Best Actress Award at the 2010 Seoul Festival Theater Award. These early wins established her reputation as a prominent figure in the South Korean theater scene.

Yeom achieved further success in film and television, beginning with a breakthrough in film in television in 2019, when she won the Best Supporting Actress Award at the 2019 KBS Drama Awards for When the Camellia Blooms and the Best Supporting Actress Award at the 57th Baeksang Arts Awards for The Uncanny Counter. Subsequent years brought additional accolades, including multiple awards for her performances in The Glory and Mask Girl, notably at the 2024 Asian Academy Creative Awards, Director's Cut Awards, and the 60th Baeksang Arts Awards. In 2025, she earned further honors for her role in When Life Gives You Tangerines, including wins at the Global OTT Awards, the 61st Baeksang Arts Awards, and the 4th Blue Dragon Series Awards.

In film, she received significant recognition starting with the Best Actress Award at the Jeonju International Film Festival and the Korea Culture Entertainment Awards for her role in independent film Black Light. Subsequent years brought additional accolades, including Best Supporting Actress Award from Golden Cinematography Awards for her role in Citizen of a Kind.

== Awards and nominations ==
Name of the award ceremony, year presented, category, nominated work, and the result of the nomination
Award	Year	Category	Nominated work	Result	Ref.
APAN Star Awards	2021	Best Supporting Actress	When the Camellia Blooms	Nominated	
Asian Academy Creative Awards	2024	Best Actress in a Supporting Role	Mask Girl	Won	
Baeksang Arts Awards	2018	Best Supporting Actress – Film	I Can Speak	Nominated	
Baeksang Arts Awards	2019	Best Supporting Actress – Film	Innocent Witness	Nominated	
Baeksang Arts Awards	2020	Best Supporting Actress – Television	When the Camellia Blooms	Nominated	
Baeksang Arts Awards	2021	Best Supporting Actress – Television	The Uncanny Counter	Won	
Baeksang Arts Awards	2023	Best Supporting Actress – Television	The Glory	Nominated	
Baeksang Arts Awards	2024	Best Supporting Actress – Television	Mask Girl	Won	
Baeksang Arts Awards	2024	Best Supporting Actress – Film	Citizen of a Kind	Nominated	
Baeksang Arts Awards	2025	Best Supporting Actress – Television	When Life Gives You Tangerines	Won	
Baeksang Arts Awards	2026	Best Supporting Actress – Film	No Other Choice	Nominated	
Beautiful Award	2004	Popularity Award	Charyeoksa and the Accordion	Won	
Bechdel Day	2021	Bechdelian in Film	Black Light	Won	
Blue Dragon Film Awards	2017	Best Supporting Actress	I Can Speak	Nominated	
Blue Dragon Film Awards	2025	Best Supporting Actress	No Other Choice	Nominated	
Blue Dragon Series Awards	2024	Best Supporting Actress	Mask Girl	Nominated	
Blue Dragon Series Awards	2024	Best Supporting Actress	When Life Gives You Tangerines	Won	
Buil Film Awards	2021	Best Actress	Black Light	Nominated	
Buil Film Awards	2026	Best Supporting Actress	No Other Choice	Won	
Chunsa Film Art Awards	2023	Best Supporting Actress	The Glory	Won	
Director's Cut Awards	2024	Best Actress in a Series	Mask Girl	Won	
Director's Cut Awards	2026	Best New Actress (Film)	No Other Choice	Won	
DongA Theater Award	2006	New Actress Award	Ask Blind Father for Direction	Won	
Dong-A.com's Pick (Note: Picked by entertainment reporter)	2023	That's Insane! Acting Award	Mask Girl	Won	
Global OTT Awards	2024	Best Supporting Actress	Mask Girl	Won	
Global OTT Awards	2025	Best Supporting Actress	When Life Gives You Tangerines	Won	
Golden Cinematography Awards	2024	Best Supporting Actress	Citizen of a Kind	Won	
Grand Bell Awards	2020	Best Supporting Actress	Innocent Witness	Nominated	
Hi-seo Theater Award	2009	Expected Actress Award	Yeom Hye-ran	Won	
Jeonju International Film Festival	2021	Best Actress	Black Light	Won	
KBS Drama Awards	2019	Best Supporting Actress	When the Camellia Blooms	Won	
KBS Drama Awards	2019	Best Couple (with Oh Jung-se)	When the Camellia Blooms	Won	
Korea Culture Entertainment Awards	2021	Best Actress in a Motion Picture	Black Light	Won	
Korea First Brand Awards	2026	Actress – Film	Yeom Hye-ran	Won	
Seoul Festival Theater Award	2010	Acting Awards	The person who lived in Gampo, Deokyi, and Yeolsu	Won	
Seoul International Drama Awards	2024	Outstanding Korean Actress	Mask Girl	Won	
Wildflower Film Awards	2021	Best Actress	Black Light	Nominated	

== Other accolades ==
=== State honors ===
Name of the organization, year presented, and the award given
Country	Ceremony	Year	Award	Ref.
South Korea	Korean Popular Culture and Arts Awards (Note: Honors are given at the Korean Popular Culture and Arts Awards, arranged by the Korea Creative Content Agency and hosted by the Ministry of Culture, Sports and Tourism. They are awarded to those who have contributed to the arts and South Korea's pop culture.)	2024	Presidential Commendation	

=== Listicles ===
Name of publisher, year listed, name of listicle, and placement
Publisher	Year	Listicle	Placement	Ref.
Korean Film Council	2021	Korean Actors 200 (Note: The list introduces the 200 actors that best represent the present and future of Korean cinema to the people in the film industry all over the world.)	Placed	
