= Yeom Hye-ran filmography =

Korean actress

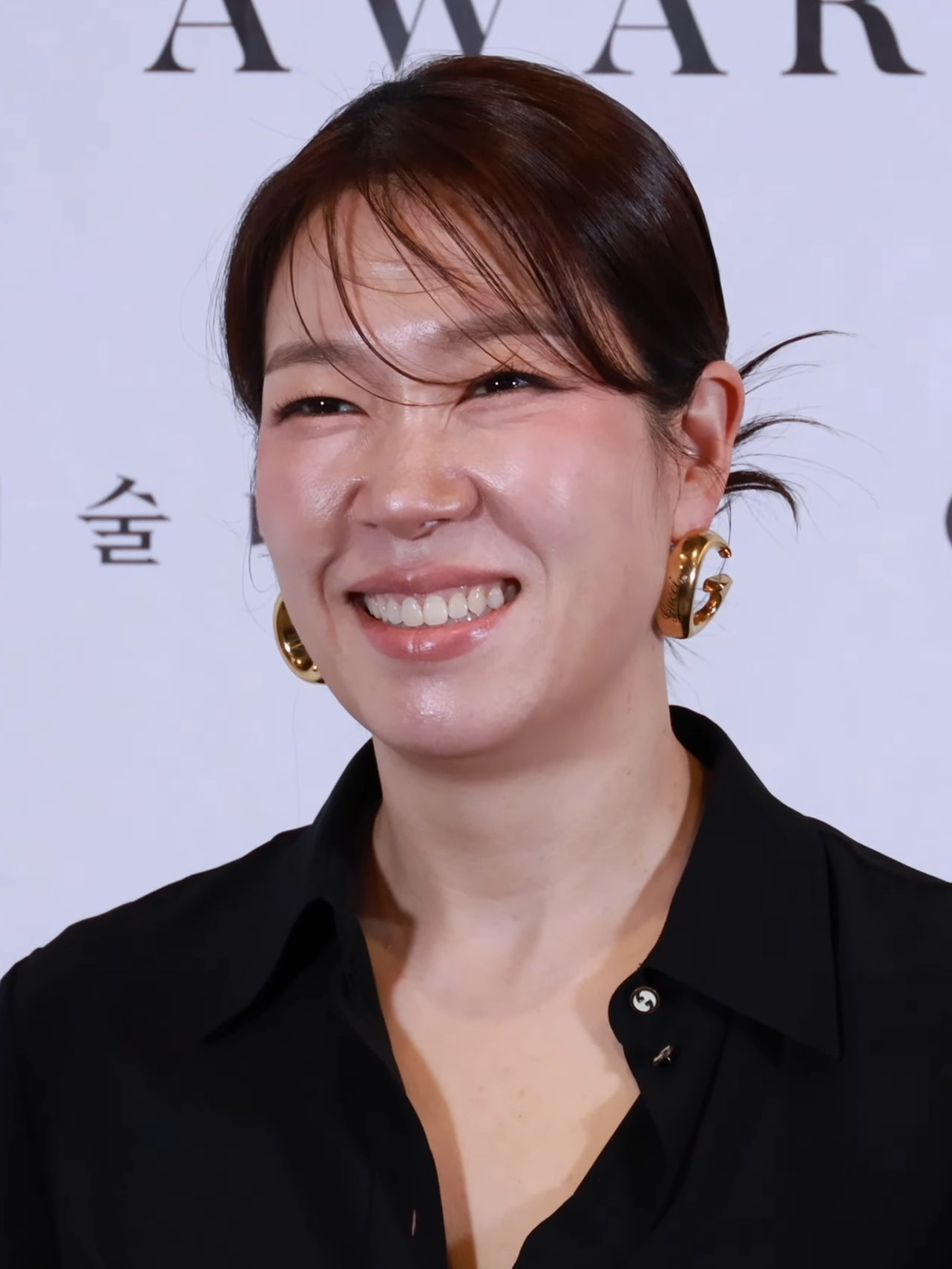
- Yeom in 2024
- Film: 39
- Television series: 22
- Web series: 1
- Television show: 1

Yeom Hye-ran (Korean: 염혜란; born October 30, 1976) is a South Korean film, television, and theater actress. Her career began on stage, where she established herself as a notable theater actress from 1999 onwards. She was a member of the Yeonwoo Theater Company and a founding member of Theater Iru, earning critical recognition and several awards in the Daehakro theater district. She made her screen debut with a minor role in director Bong Joon-ho's 2003 film Memories of Murder (2003).

In 2016, Yeom transitioned into television after being discovered by writer Noh Hee-kyung, making her small-screen debut in Noh's drama Dear My Friends (2016). It was followed by a supporting role as villain in Kim Eun-sook's drama Guardian: The Lonely and Great God (2016). She later reunited with Noh Hee-kyung on two subsequent projects, The Most Beautiful Goodbye (2016) and Live (2018). She achieved mainstream recognition for her supporting performance in Lim Sang-choon series When the Camellia Blooms (2019) and in the two seasons of the action drama The Uncanny Counter (2020–2023).

In film, Yeom took her first title role in the 2021 mystery film Black Light, a critically acclaimed performance that earned her multiple Best Actress awards. More recently, she has garnered critical acclaim and international recognition for her work in Netflix original productions, including The Glory (2022–2023), Mask Girl (2023), and When Life Gives You Tangerines (2025). Her most recent project is Park Chan-wook's film No Other Choice (2025).

== Filmography ==
=== Film ===
Year	Title	Role	Notes	Ref.
2003	Memories of Murder	So-hyeon's mother		
2004	Fighter in the Wind	Circus troupe middle-aged woman		
2006	Les Formidables	Teacher Gong		
2006	Holiday			
2007	Our Town	Rice cake vendor		
2007	Secret Sunshine	Husband's family member		
2008	Open City	Garbage bag woman 1		
2010	71: Into the Fire	Fierce nurse		
2011	Always	Beauty parlor owner		
2012	All About My Wife			
2014	Sea Fog	Shipowner's wife		
2015	The Magician	Nanny		
2015	Salut d'Amour	Milk woman		
2017	I Can Speak	Jin Joo-daek		
2017	Man of Will	Visitor		
2018	Golden Slumber	Store middle-aged woman		
2018	Default			
2019	Innocent Witness	Mi-ran		
2019	Another Child	Pregnant woman's mom		
2019	Miss & Mrs. Cops			
2019	Juror 8			
2019	Kim Ji-young: Born 1982	Woman with scarf in the past	Cameo	
2019	Baseball Girl	Shin Hae-sook		
2020	Best Friend	Woman from Yeosu		
2020	Secret Garden	Jung won's aunt	Independent film	
2021	I	Mi-ja		
2021	New Year Blues	Yong-mi		
2021	Black Light	Young-nam		
2021	Recalled	Soo-jin's friend		
2021	Chun Tae-il: A Flame That Lives On	Lee So-sun	Voice	
2022	Special Delivery	Mi-young		
2022	Life Is Beautiful			
2022	The Boys	Kim Kyeong-mi		
2023	Ungnam-i	Jang Gyeong-sook	Documentary	
2024	Citizen of a Kind	Bong-rim		
2024	Amazon Bullseye	Cha Soo-hyeon		
2025	Virus	Mak-soon		
2025	Wall To Wall	Eun-hwa		
2025	No Other Choice	A-ra		
2026	Mad Dance Office	Kuk-hee		
2026	My Name	Jeong-sun		

=== Television series ===
Year	Title	Role	Notes	Ref.
2016	Dear My Friends	Kim Soon-young		
2016	The K2	Housekeeper		
2016–2017	Guardian: The Lonely and Great God	Ji Yeon-suk		
2017	Queen for Seven Days	Chae-kyung's personal nursemaid		
2017	Live Up to Your Name	Restaurant owner	Special appearance	
2017	Prison Playbook	Yoo Han-yang's mother		
2017	The Most Beautiful Goodbye	Yang-soon		
2018	Live	Sang-soo's mother		
2018	Lawless Lawyer	Nam Soon-ja		
2018	Life	Kang Kyung-ah		
2019	When the Camellia Blooms	Hong Ja-yeong		
2019–2020	Chocolate	Nurse Ha		
2020	Hospital Playlist	Min-young's mother	Special appearance	
2020	Mystic Pop-up Bar	God of the Underworld		
2020	SF8	Choi Jung-gil	Episode: "The Prayer"	
2020–2023	The Uncanny Counter	Choo Mae-ok		
2022	Juvenile Justice	Oh Seon-ja		
2022	Alchemy of Souls	Mysterious middle-aged woman	Special appearance	
2022–2023	The Glory	Kang Hyeon-nam		
2023	Mask Girl	Kim Kyung-ja		
2025	When Life Gives You Tangerines	Jeon Gwang-rye / Chloe H. Lee		
2025	Law and the City	Kim Hyung-min		

=== Web series ===
Year	Title	Role	Ref.
2014	Love Cells	Dae-chung's landlord	

=== Television show ===
Year	Title		Role	Ref.
Year	English	Korean	Role	Ref.
2024	My Name is Gabriel	마이 네임 이즈 가브리엘	Cast member	
