= Kim Hieora =

South Korean actress (born 1989)

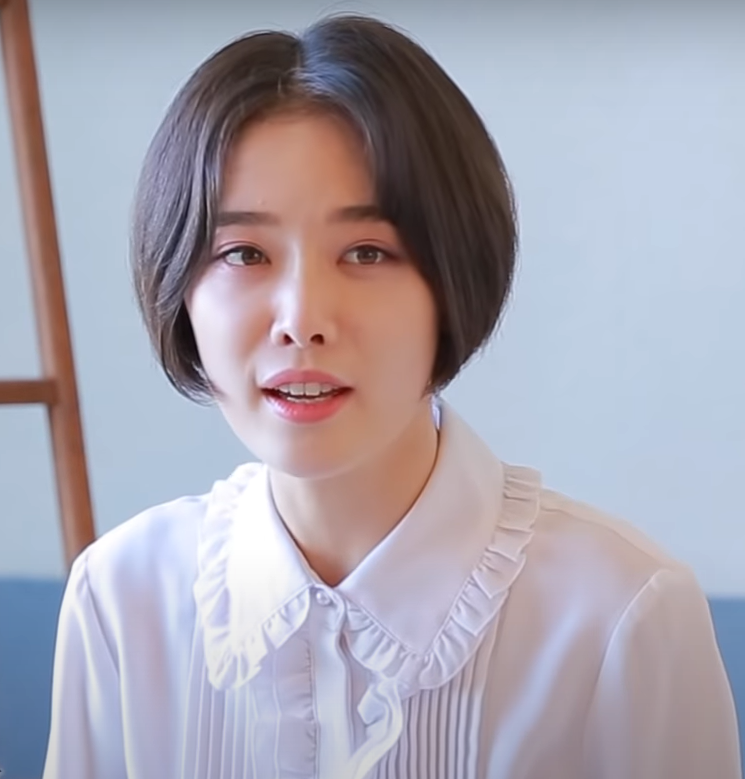
- Kim in 2019
- Born: March 18, 1989 (age 37); Wonju, Gangwon Province, South Korea
- Education: Chungkang College of Cultural Industries (School of Musical & Theatre)
- Occupations: Actress; theater actor; musical actor
- Years active: 2009–present
- Agent: Gram Entertainment

Korean name
- Hangul: 김히어라
- RR: Gim Hieora
- MR: Kim Hiŏra

Kim Hieora (Korean: 김히어라; born March 18, 1989), is a South Korean actress. She gained recognition for her role as Lee Sa-ra in The Glory (2022–2023).

== Career ==
Kim made her acting debut in the musical Jack the Ripper in 2009, and has had a long career since then acting in plays and musicals.

In 2021, she made her face known in a television series Beyond Evil, Hospital Playlist 2, Bad and Crazy, and Extraordinary Attorney Woo.

=== 2022–present: Rise in popularity ===
Kim gained prominence by playing the role of Lee Sa-ra, a drug-addicted painter and one of the perpetrators of school violence in the Netflix TV series The Glory. She said in an interview that the director asked if she would read for the role due to her eyes. Kim looked for many references while preparing for this role.

In April 2023, Kim signed with Gram Entertainment, a one-man agency founded by her manager who has been with her for a long time. Kim appeared in tvN's drama The Uncanny Counter for a second season, which premiered on July 29, 2023.

== Bullying allegations controversy ==
In September 2023, shortly after The Uncanny Counter finished airing its second season (in which Kim was a cast member), there were school bullying allegations put up against Kim, who was allegedly a member of an infamous gang of school bullies from her middle school. Kim later admitted to being a bystander but denied any direct participation in the bullying of her fellow schoolmates back in middle school, in contrast to the victim's claims of her supposed involvement.

== Filmography ==
=== Television series ===
Year	Title	Role	Notes/Ref.
2021	Beyond Evil	Bang Ju-seon	Cameo (episode 1)
2021	Hospital Playlist 2	An Seong-ju	Cameo (episode 7)
2021	Bad and Crazy	Boss Yong	
2022	Forecasting Love and Weather	Motel woman	Cameo (episode 5–6)
2022	Extraordinary Attorney Woo	Gye Hyang-sim	Cameo (episode 6)
2022	Bad Prosecutor	Secretary Tae Hyung-wook	
2023	O'PENing: "Shoot Me"	Shooting coach	One-act drama; cameo
2023	The Uncanny Counter	Gelli Berherd	Season 2

=== Web series ===
Year	Title	Role	Notes/Ref.
2022–2023	The Glory	Lee Sa-ra	Part 1–2

== Awards and nominations ==
Name of the award ceremony, year presented, category, nominee of the award, and the result of the nomination
Award ceremony	Year	Category	Nominee / Work	Result	Ref.
Baeksang Arts Awards	2023	Best New Actress – Television	The Glory	Nominated	
Director's Cut Awards	2023	Best New Actress – Series	Bad Prosecutor	Nominated	
Yegreen Musical Awards	2017	Best New Actress	History of Losers	Won	
Daegu International Musical Festival	2013	Best Supporting Actress	You&I	Won	
StageTalk Audience Choice Awards	2017	Best New Actress	Behemoth	Won	
