= Citizen of a Kind =

2024 film by Park Young-ju

- Theatrical release poster
- Hangul: 시민덕희
- Hanja: 市民덕희
- Lit.: Citizen Deokhee
- RR: Simin Deokhui
- MR: Simin Tŏkhŭi
- Directed by: Park Young-ju
- Written by: Park Young-ju
- Produced by: Baek Chang-ju; Jeong Jae-yeon
- Starring: Ra Mi-ran; Gong Myung; Yeom Hye-ran; Park Byung-eun; Jang Yoon-ju; Lee Moo-saeng; Ahn Eun-jin
- Cinematography: Lee Hyung-bin
- Edited by: Kim Sun-min
- Music by: Hwang Sang-jun
- Production companies: C-JeS Studios; Page One Film
- Distributed by: Showbox
- Release date: January 24, 2024
- Running time: 114 minutes
- Country: South Korea
- Language: Korean
- Box office: US$12 million

Citizen of a Kind (Korean: 시민덕희) is a 2024 South Korean crime drama film directed by Park Young-ju, starring Ra Mi-ran, Gong Myung, Yeom Hye-ran, Park Byung-eun, Jang Yoon-ju, Lee Moo-saeng, and Ahn Eun-jin. It is based on the true story of Kim Seong-ja, a laundromat owner in Hwaseong, Gyeonggi, who caught the head of a voice phishing organization in 2016. It was released on January 24, 2024.

== Plot ==
Deok-hee seeks a loan due to a fire at her laundromat. The bank calls and offers a generous upfront loan so she takes it right away. She is shocked to realize later that she is the victim of a voice phishing scheme. Deok-hee loses tens of thousands of dollars and ends up on the streets with her children. One day, the phisher who tricked her, Jae-min, calls again to tip Deok-hee off about the criminal organization that locked him up. Though police have given up on her case, Deok-hee flies directly to Qingdao with her co-workers to rescue Jae-min and get her money back.

== Cast ==
- Ra Mi-ran as Kim Deok-hee
- Gong Myung as Kwon Jae-min
- Yeom Hye-ran as Bong-rim
- Park Byung-eun as Park Hyeong-sik
- Jang Yoon-ju as Sook-ja
- Lee Moo-saeng as Oh Myung-hwan
- Ahn Eun-jin as Ae-rim
- Lee Joo-seung as Kyeong-cheol
- Sung Hyuk as Dae-woo
- Kim Yool-ho as Detective Kim
- Shim Wan-joon as Information Team Leader
- Seo Ji-hoo as Detective Shin

== Production ==
Principal photography began in September 2020 and ended in December 2020.

== Reception ==
=== Box office ===
As of February 4, 2024, Citizen of a Kind has grossed $5.8 million with a running total of 837,959 tickets sold.

=== Accolades ===
Award	Year	Category	Recipient(s)	Result	Ref.
Baeksang Arts Awards	2024	Best New Director	Park Young-ju	Nominated	
Baeksang Arts Awards	2024	Best Actress	Ra Mi-ran	Nominated	
Baeksang Arts Awards	2024	Best Supporting Actress	Yeom Hye-ran	Nominated	
Baeksang Arts Awards	2024	Gucci Impact Award	Citizen of a Kind	Nominated	
Bechdel Day	2024	Bechdel Choice 10 — Film	Citizen of a Kind	Top 10	
Bechdel Day	2024	Bechdelian in film — Actress of the Year	Ra Mi-ran	Won	
