= Yeom Hye-ran =

South Korean actress (born 1976)

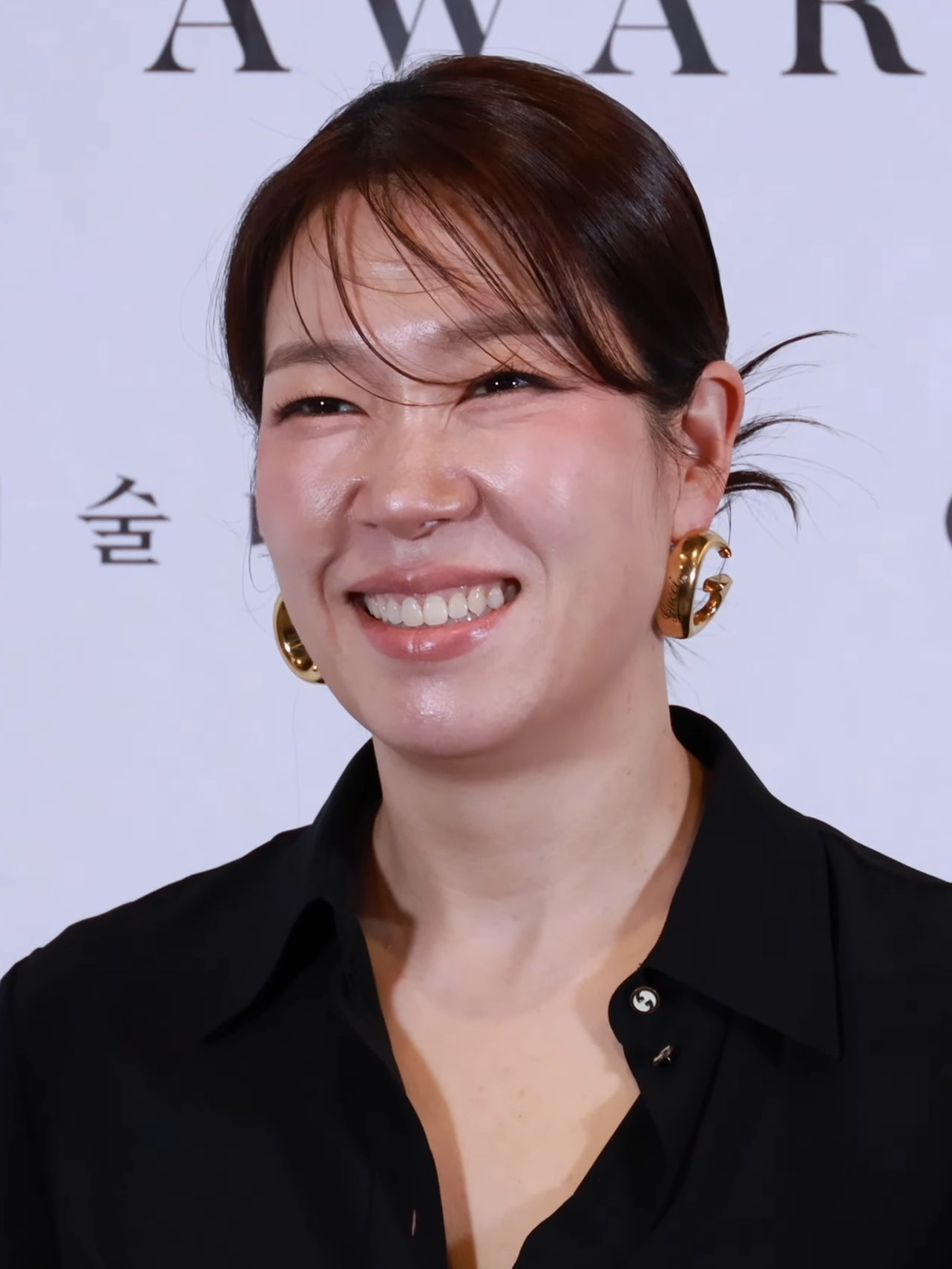
- Yeom in April 2024
- Born: October 30, 1976 (age 49); Yeosu, South Korea
- Education: Seoul Women's University – Department of Korean Language & Literature
- Occupation: Actress
- Years active: 1999–present
- Agent: Ace Factory
- Works: Filmography; theater
- Spouse: Undisclosed (m. 2005)
- Children: 1
- Awards: Full list

Korean name
- Hangul: 염혜란
- Hanja: 廉惠蘭
- RR: Yeom Hyeran
- MR: Yŏm Hyeran

Yeom Hye-ran (Korean: 염혜란; born October 30, 1976) is a South Korean film, television, and theater actress. She is known for her roles in dramas When the Camellia Blooms (2019), The Uncanny Counter (2020–2023), The Glory (2022–2023), Mask Girl (2023), and When Life Gives You Tangerines (2025). She is the recipient of three Baeksang Arts Award for Best Supporting Actress – Television.

== Early life ==
Yeom was born on October 30, 1976, in Yeosu, South Korea. She comes from a family of farmers, and her mother sold rice at the local market.

Yeom originally intended to become a Korean teacher. To pursue this goal, she enrolled in the Department of Korean Literature at Seoul Women's University. It was while attending the university and participating as a member of the college theater club that she discovered her passion for acting.

== Career ==
=== Beginning as Yeonwoo Theater Company member (1999–2003) ===
Yeom came across flyers seeking new members for the Yeonwoo Theater Company by chance. (Note: Yeonwoo Stage (연우무대), which means 'playing friend', started as a small group on February 5, 1977, and is Korea's representative theater company that has led the revitalization of creative plays in the Korean theater world. From the days of Sinchon to the present in Hyehwa-dong, Yeonwoo Stage has been working hard to realize the complete stage of novel creative works.) In 1999, she successfully auditioned and was accepted as a member. The following year, Yeom debuted as an actress with the play Teacher Choi.

Yeom made her screen debut in Bong Joon-ho's film Memories of Murder (2003) with small role. Bong first recognized Yeom's talent through her portrayal of So-hyeon's mother in the Yeonwoo play This Lee, which led to an invitation to audition for the film.

Also in 2003, Yeom took part in the play The Charyeoksa and the Accordion, produced by the theater company Iwa-sam, and written and directed by Jang Woo-jae. The play tells the story of an accordionist searching for his runaway wife, alongside his friend Cha Charyeoksa, a third-rate theater actor Yang Yang-sook, and a naive young virgin named Sunny. Yeom's performance as Sunny was praised as chilling. Discussing the performance in a 2019 interview, Yeom said The Charyeoksa and the Accordion was her most sincere work, adding that Sunny resembles the character Gelsomina from her favorite film, La Strada.

The play was selected for the 2003 Culture and Arts Promotion Agency New Artist Support and had an encore performance in 2004 due to positive audience response, with Yeom reprising her role as Sunny. In December 2004, she won the Popular Actress Award from the 1st Beautiful Play Award, voted by theater netizens, for her performance as Sunny.

=== Founding member of Theater Iru and critical acclaim onstage (2004–2012) ===
In 2004, when a former Yeonwoo member Son Ki-ho established Theater Company Iru (Korean: 극단 이루) in Seondol Theater, Yeom and Woo Mi-hwa joined as founding members. The company's first play was Ask the Blind Father for Directions, written and directed by Son Ki-ho. It premiered on June 4, 2004, at Dongsung Stage Small Theater in Daehangno, Seoul. The story focused on a family facing hardship, including a son diagnosed with cancer and a parent with a disability. Yeom played the role of Seon-ho's mother, acting opposite Kim Hak-sun who played the father. Her performance drew significant praise; she was even dubbed the "second Hwang Jung-min." Her co-star Kim Hak-sun stated: "Hye-ran is an actress who can act as if memories of the past flood in at once, like a shaman receiving a reception."

The play won an award at The 16th Geochang International Theatre Festival and received support from the Seoul Foundation for the Arts and Culture. Yeom reprised her role in the play in a run from March to July 2005 at the National Theater, Seoul Arts Theater, and other venues. In February 2006, Yeom won the Best Newcomer Award at the 42nd Dong-A Theater Awards for her work in the production.

In 2008, Yeom played the role of Park Mi-cheon in Son Ki-ho's play The Person Who Lived in Gampo, Deokyi, and Yeolsu, a role she reprised in 2009. In 2009, she won the Expected Theater Actress Award at the 14th Hee-seo Theater Awards. (Note: The Hi-seo Theatre Award was named after Gu Hi-seo, a well-known theater critic. Prizes and bonuses for cultural artists were raised from the auction at the meta-dum wine party.) In May 2010, the play was featured at the 2010 Seoul Theater Festival, where Yeom won an Acting Award and the play received a Popularity Award.

=== Transition to television and early success (2014–2018) ===
Following a temporary hiatus from acting after giving birth in 2012, Yeom worked as an assistant writer for Shim Sung-bo's film Sea Fog. She was offered a minor role in the film, which marked her return to acting. Subsequently, she continued to take small roles in films and returned to the stage for theater productions in 2015.

Yeom debuted on television with Noh Hee-kyung's drama Dear My Friends in 2016. Directed by Hong Jong-chan, the drama featured a prominent ensemble cast, including Go Hyun-jung, Kim Hye-ja, Na Moon-hee, Go Doo-shim, Park Won-sook, Youn Yuh-jung, Joo Hyun, Kim Young-ok and Shin Goo. Yeom played Soon-yeong, the adopted eldest daughter of Moon Jung-ah (played by Na Moon-hee), who was a victim of domestic violence. Yeom was praised for her role, creating an unforgettable mother-daughter bond with Na. Her casting in the drama was fortuitous. Writer Noh Hee-kyung attended Na Moon-hee's play Goodnight Mom, where Yeom played Na's character daughter, Jessi. Impressed by her performance, Noh offered her a role in the upcoming drama through Na. Yeom later recalled, "Teacher Na Moon-hee and the writer are very close, so she came to see the performance. Dear My Friends was in the planning stage, and she said that it would be nice for me to appear. The drama flourished thanks to everyone's hard work and performances. If I had met her for the first time during the drama filming, I would have frozen in front of her since she is a senior of mine I respect so much."

In the same year, Yeom acted as a supporting role in Kim Eun-sook's drama, Guardian: The Lonely and Great God. She took the role of Ji Yeon-sook, Ji Eun-tak's maternal aunt who bullied Eun-tak (Kim Go-eun) for her sister's life insurance. Although the character was a villain, Yeom's portrayal added comedic elements and elicited laughter from viewers.

In 2017, Yeom reunited for the second time with Noh Hee-kyung and director Hong Jong-chan for the four-episode-drama The Most Beautiful Goodbye. It was a remake of Noh's 1996 MBC drama of the same name. Yeom played Shin Yang-soon, the wife of Kim Geun-deok (Yoo Jae-myung), who was the brother of the main character In-hee (Won Mi-kyung). In 2018, Yeom worked for the third time with Noh Hee-kyung in her drama Live as Yeom Sang-soo's mother (Lee Kwang-soo). Yeom also reunited for the third time with director Hong Jong-chan in the drama Life as Kang Kyung-ah, the general manager of Sangkook University Hospital. It was written by Lee Soo-yeon.

In the same year, Yeom also reunited with Na Moon-hee in the feature film I Can Speak. She played Jin Ju-daek, a market shop owner who has a close relationship with the main character, Na Ok-bun (Na Moon-hee). Yeom was cast in I Can Speak after the casting director watched her audition video for Secret Sunshine from a decade prior.

=== Breakthrough, first titular role in film and acclaim (2019–2024) ===
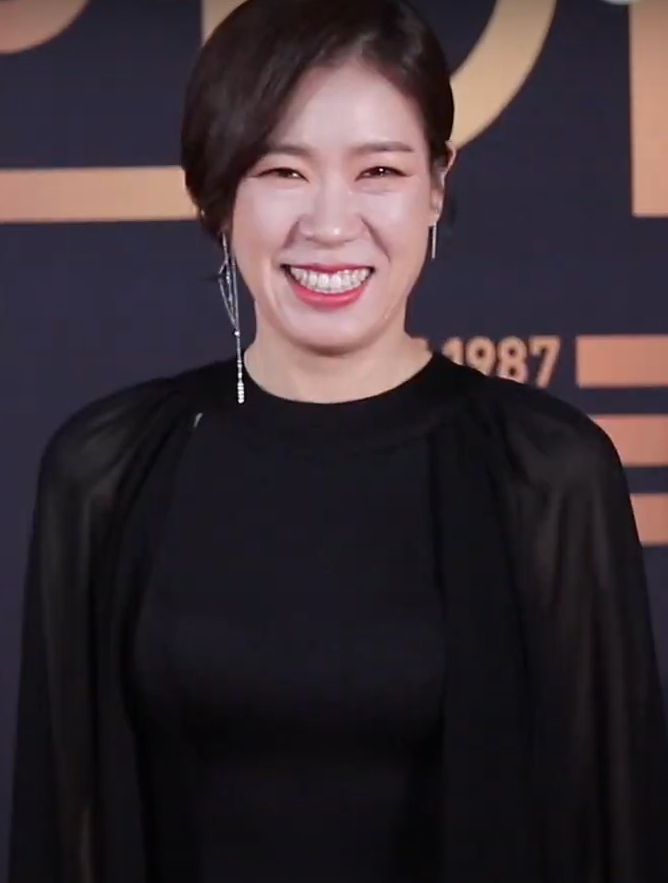
Yeom in December 2019

In 2019, Yeom landed a supporting role in the KBS2 drama When the Camellia Blooms. written by Lim Sang-choon. She portrayed Hong Ja-young, a sophisticated divorce lawyer married to Gyu-tae (portrayed by Oh Jung-se). Hong is portrayed as a confident and charismatic woman with trust issues in her marriage. Her performance in the drama received positive feedback from viewers, who admired her character as a girl crush and she was dubbed "the nation's older sister" by the press. This performance resulted in her winning the Best Supporting Actress Award and the Best Couple Award with Oh Jung-se at the KBS Drama Awards. She also received nominations for Best Supporting Actress at the 7th APAN Star Awards and at the 56th Baeksang Arts Awards.

More than two decades after her debut, Yeom took her first in Bae Jong-dae's mystery film Blacklight, which was released in February 2021. Produced by One Take Film and New Life, the film depicts two women whose fates are entangled through their husbands' car accidents. Yeom played Yeong-nam, a single mom who had to care for her daughter and her comatose husband. This performance was critically acclaimed, resulting in wins for Best Actress Awards at the 8th Wildflower Film Awards, the 30th Buil Film Awards, and the 21st Jeonju International Film Festival.

That same year, Yeom starred in the OCN drama The Uncanny Counter with Jo Byung-gyu, Yoo Jun-sang, and Kim Se-jeong. Yeom played Cho Mae-ok, a former photographer who possesses powerful healing abilities. She joined the Counters after being possessed by her son Su-ho's spirit. Her portrayal earned her the Best Supporting Actress Award at the 57th Baeksang Arts Awards. The series became the highest-rated OCN series.

In 2022, she starred in the Netflix revenge thriller web series The Glory, starring Song Hye-kyo as Kang Hyeon-nam, a battered wife who became an accomplice to the protagonist's quest for revenge. She was nominated for Best Supporting Actress Award at the 58th Baeksang Arts Awards for this role.

In 2023, Yeom reprised her role as Cho Mae-ok in the second season of The Uncanny Counter. It aired from July 29 to September 3, 2023, on tvN's Saturdays and Sundays timeslot for 12 episodes. It is also available for streaming on Netflix in selected regions. On August 18, 2023, she returned to Netflix with black comedy crime thriller series Mask Girl, written and directed by Kim Yong-hoon. It is based on the Naver webtoon of the same name by Mae-mi and Hee-se, which was published between 2015 and 2018. She played Kim Kyung-ja, a mother who is devastated and enraged when her son returns home dead. Her sorrow and anger intensify as she blames the 'Mask Girl' for his death, leading her to spiral into madness as she seeks vengeance. Her performance in this role won her the Best Supporting Actress award at the 60th Baeksang Arts Awards.

=== Career resurgence and further acclaimed (2025–present) ===
In 2025, she had five projects released. From March to April 2025, she appeared in the Netflix series When Life Gives You Tangerines. This marked her reunion with writer Lim Sang-choon after drama When the Camellia Blooms. Director Kim Won-seok mentioned that the writer personally selected Yeom as Jeon Gwang-rye, the mother of the main protagonist Ae-sun (played by IU/Moon So-ri). Her portrayal of the character's maternal love resonated with viewers, dubbed as a "tear-button" for her ability to evoke emotions. Her performance in the role earned her the Best Supporting Actress Awards at both the 61st Baeksang Arts Awards and the 4th Blue Dragon Series Awards. She was also nominated for Best Supporting Actress Award at the 2025 Global OTT Awards.

The film Virus, written and directed by Kang Yi-kwan, premiered in South Korean theaters on May 7, 2025, distributed by By4M Studio. Yeom played the supporting role of Yeom Mak-soon in the film, which also starred Bae Doona, Kim Yoon-seok, Chang Kiha, and Son Suk-ku. In July, two projects featuring Yeom were released. Yeom played the supporting role of Kim Hyung-min in the tvN series Law and the City. The show aired from July 5 to August 10 on Saturdays and Sundays. Written by Lee Seung-hyun and directed by Park Seung-woo, Yeom starred alongside Lee Jong-suk, Moon Ga-young, Kang You-seok, Ryu Hye-young, and Im Seong-jae. Her Netflix thriller film Wall to Wall, written and directed by Kim Tae-joon, and co-starring Kang Ha-neul and Seo Hyun-woo, premiered on July 18, 2025.

Later that year, the film No Other Choice, directed by Park Chan-wook, had its world premiere in the main competition of the 82nd Venice International Film Festival on August 29, 2025. It had its North American premiere on September 5, 2025, at the 2025 Toronto International Film Festival. It subsequently had its domestic premiere as the opening film of the 30th Busan International Film Festival on September 17, 2025, followed by a theatrical release in South Korea on September 24 by CJ Entertainment. Yeom played the role of Lee A-ra, Goo Beom-mo 's (Lee Sung-min) frustrated and unfaithful wife, and a struggling veteran actress.

== Personal life ==
Yeom married her non-celebrity husband in 2005. Following the birth of their daughter in 2012, Yeom temporarily suspended her acting activities. At that time, she worked on adapting dialogue for film Sea Fog. She was back into acting with a minor role in the same film.

== Theater ==
Theater play performance(s)
| Year | Title | | Role | Theater | Date | Ref. |
| Year | English | Korean | Role | Theater | Date | Ref. |
|---|---|---|---|---|---|---|
| 2000 | Choi Teacher | 최선생 | —N/a | | | |
| 2000 | Living Double Life | 살아있는 이중생 각하 | Woo | Yeonwoo Small Theater; Samcheok Culture & Arts Center; Donghae Culture and Arts Center | September 16 – October 24 | |
| 2000 | (2000) Seoul International Children's Performing Arts Festival; love is the morning sun | (2000) 서울국제어린이 공연예술제; 사랑은 아침햇살 | | Dongsung Arts Center Small Theater | July 13–15 | |
| 2000 | Lee | 이 (爾) | Wooin, Gisaeng, Court lady | Culture and Art Hall Grand Theater | November 18–28 | |
| 2001 | Guys, let's go to Yonggung - The play that the whole family can watch together <Rabbit Story> | 얘들아, 용궁가자 - 온 가족이 함께 보는 연극놀이 <토끼전> | Rabbit | Yeonwoo Small Theater | April 28 – June 3 | |
| 2001 | (2001) Seoul Children and Youth Performing Arts Festival; Guys, let's go to the dragon palace | (2001) 서울 아동청소년 공연예술축제; 얘들아, 용궁가자 | Rabbit | Yeonwoo Small Theater | July 11 – August 26 | |
| 2001 | (2001) SPAF Seoul Performing Arts Festival: Lee | (2001) SPAF 서울공연예술제: 이 (爾) | Wooin, Gisaeng, Court lady | Culture and Art Hall Grand Theater | October 13–18 | |
| 2001 | Lee | 이 (爾) | Wooin, Gisaeng, Court lady | Yeonwoo Small Theater | November 8 – December 9 | |
| 2001 | (2001) Gwacheon Madang Theater Festival; Lee | (2001) 과천마당극제; 이 (爾) | Wooin, Gisaeng, Court lady | Civic Center Grand Theater | September 15–17 | |
| 2002 | Chosun Ilbo 'Can it be like this' | 조선일보 '이럴수가 있나요' | in-house wife | Cultural Center Small Theater | March 12–18 | |
| 2002 | (2002) Seoul Children and Youth Performing Arts Festival; stamp | (2002) 서울 아동청소년 공연예술축제; 스탬프 | in-house wife | Egg and Nucleus Small Theater | July 20–21 | |
| 2002–2003 | Do you have a free room | 빈방 있습니까 | in-house wife | Daehangno Information Theater | December 10 – January 5 | |
| 2003 | That person is like a radish | 연극 저 사람 무우당 같다 | | Cultural Arts Promotion Agency Arts Theater Hakjeon Blue Small Theater | April 4–20 | |
| 2003 | That person is like a radish - encore performance | 저 사람 무우당 같다 - 앵콜공연 | | Yeonwoo Small Theater | April 25 – May 25 | |
| 2003 | Ahn Eun-mi and the Fisherman Project - (2003) Ahn Eun-mi's Dance·Seoul | 안은미와 어어부프로젝트 - (2003) 안은미의 춤·서울 | black plastic bag | Seoul Arts Center Jayu Small Theater | May 5–8 | |
| 2003 | Charyeoksa and the Accordion | 차력사와 아코디언 | Sunny | Small Theater Yeonwoo Stage | September 17–28 | |
| 2003 | Living Cool as a Couple | 부부 쿨하게 살기 | Kang Yoo-jeong | Cheil Fire Cecil Theater | October 22–25 | |
| 2003 | Charyeoksa and the Accordion | 차력사와 아코디언 | Sunny | Dongsung Arts Center Small Theater | September 28 – November 16 | |
| 2003 | Charyeoksa and the Accordion | 차력사와 아코디언 | Sunny | Small Theater Yeonwoo Stage | Dec 17–28 | |
| 2004 | Ask the Blind Father for Directions | 하류인생에도 삶은 있어 | Mother | Dongsung Arts Center Small Theater | June 4 – July 4 | |
| 2004 | The 16th Geochang International Theatre Festival; Ask the Blind Father for Directions | (제16회) 거창국제연극제; 눈먼 아비에게 길을 묻다 | Mother | Persimmon Theater | August 1 | |
| 2004 | Seoul International Performing Arts Festival; Charyeoksa and the Accordion | 차력사와 아코디언 | Sunny | Daehangno Hakjeon Blue Small Theater | August 8–24 | |
| 2004 | Seoul International Performing Arts Festival; Charyeoksa and the Accordion | 차력사와 아코디언 | Sunny | Daehangno Hakjeon Blue Small Theater | October 8–13 | |
| 2004 | Charyeoksa and the Accordion | 차력사와 아코디언 | Sunny | Daehangno Hakjeon Blue Small Theater | October 28 – November 28 | |
| 2005 | Ask the Blind Father for Directions | 하류인생에도 삶은 있어 | Mother | National Theater Star Oreum Theater | May 4–22 | |
| 2005 | Ask the Blind Father for Directions | 하류인생에도 삶은 있어 | Mother | Jeonju Korea Sori Culture Center Myeongin Hall; Yeongdeok Yeju Culture and Arts Center; Changwon Seongsan Art Hall Small Theater | May 4 – July 23 | |
| 2005 | Ask the Blind Father for Directions | 하류인생에도 삶은 있어 | Mother | Seoul Arts Center Jayu Theater | June 17 – July 17 | |
| 2006 | When a man loves a woman | 남자가 여자를 사랑할 때 | Female, Kim Nam-soo | Arko Arts Theatre Small Theatre | June 16 – July 2 | |
| 2007 | Incident 1980 | 사건발생 1980 | Jeong-ja | Theater Laboratory 1 Hyehwa-dong | May 18–27 | |
| 2007 | The incident occurred | 사건발생 일구팔공 | Jeong-ja | Daehangno Showtic Theater 2 (Former Valentine's Theatre 2) | July 20 – August 19 | |
| 2007 | Not love story | 연애얘기아님 | Mi-jin | Daehak-ro guerilla theatre | June 13 – July 1 | |
| 2007 | Reflection | 반성 | Shin Hye-seon | Daehakro Theater The Other | March 2 – April 1 | |
| 2008 | The Person who Lived in Gampo, Deokyi, and Yeolsu | 감포사는 분이, 덕이, 열수 | Park Mi-cheon | Seondol Theater in Daehangno, Seoul | Oct 17 – Nov 16 | |
| 2008 | Stand on the Sunstone | 선돌에 서다 | | Daehak-ro Sundol Theatre | May 22 – Jun 22 | |
| 2009 | The Late Horse in the Fountain | 그 샘에 고인 말 | A specialist | Daehakro Arts Theatre Small Theatre | December 3–16 | |
| 2009 | Sakateyoji Festival - Attic Room | 사카테요지 페스티벌 - 다락방 | | Arko Arts Theatre Small Theatre | June 8–28 | |
| 2009 | The Person who Lived in Gampo, Deokyi, and Yeolsu | 감포사는 분이, 덕이, 열수 | Park Mi-cheon | Seondol Theater in Daehangno, Seoul | April 13 – May 17 | |
| 2009–2010 | Theater Heated Battle 3 - Mothers' Chatter | 연극열전3 - 엄마들의 수다 | | Dongsung Art Center Small Theater | December 18 – February 28 | |
| 2009–2010 | Ask the Blind Father for Directions | 하류인생에도 삶은 있어 | Mother | Seondol Theater in Daehangno, Seoul | Sep 25 – Jan 24 | |
| 2010 | Rhino - Ansan | 코뿔소 - 안산 | | Ansan Culture and Arts Center Dalmaji Theater | October 22–23 | |
| 2011 | Aerobics boys | 에어로빅보이즈 | Sun-ok | Daehakro Arts Theatre Small Theatre | January 5–7 | |
| 2011 | The 32nd Seoul Theater Festival: If There's a Peach Blossom, Pine Flowers Will Fly | (제32회) 서울연극제: 복사꽃 지면 송화 날리고 | Seom Yeon-daek | Arko Arts Theater Small Theater | May 6–8 | |
| 2011 | The Tears of a Mouse | 쥐의 눈물 | Mother (Suzu) | Guro Art Valley Arts Theatre | October 14–23 | |
| 2011–2012 | Good News in Our Neighbourhood | 우리동네 굿뉴스 | | Seondol Theater in Daehangno, Seoul | December 13 – January 15 | |
| 2012 | The Snow of March | 3월의 눈 | Tong-Jang | National Theater Company's Baek Seong-hee and Jang Min-ho Theater | March 1–18 | |
| 2012 | The Tears of a Mouse | 쥐의 눈물 | Mother (Suzu) | Sowol Art Hall | March 30–31 | |
| 2012 | If There's a Peach Blossom, Pine Flowers Will Fly | 복사꽃 지면 송화 날리고 | Seom Yeon-daek | Daehakro Arts Theater Main Hall | April 7–15 | |
| 2012 | The Song of Spring Flows in the Sea | 봄의 노래는 바다에 흐르고 | | Namsan Arts Center Drama Center | June 12 – July 1 | |
| 2012 | If There's a Peach Blossom, Pine Flowers Will Fly | 복사꽃 지면 송화 날리고 | Seom Yeon-daek | Daegu Suseong Artpia Paper Hall | August 10–12 | |
| 2015 | The Boy in the Last Row | 맨 끝줄 소년 | Juana | Seoul Arts Center Jayu Theater | November 10 – December 3 | |
| 2015 | 'night, Mother | 잘자요 엄마 | Jessie | Art One Theater | July 3 – August 30 | |
| 2016 | I Love You, Mom | 사랑해 엄마 | Mom | Dongsung Art Center Puppet Theater | January 15 – February 28 | |
| 2016 | I Love You, Mom | 사랑해 엄마 | Mom | Seondol Theater in Daehangno, Seoul | March 8 – April 24 | |
| 2017 | If There's a Peach Blossom, Pine Flowers Will Fly | 복사꽃 지면 송화 날리고 | Seom Yeon-daek | Daehakro Arts Theater Main Hall | May 27 – June 4 | |
