= Baeksang Arts Award for Best Supporting Actress – Television =

Korean media award

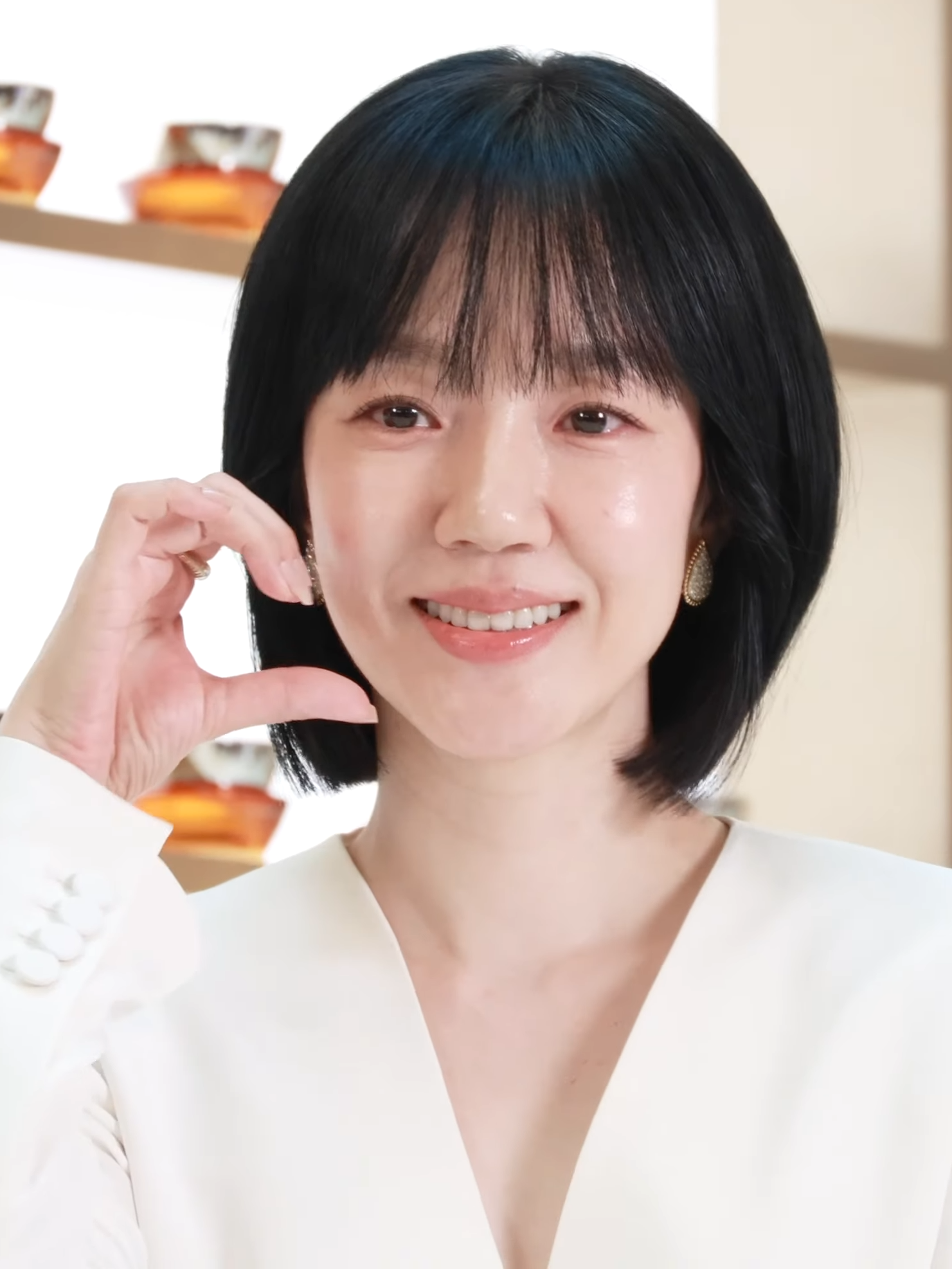
- 2026 recipient: Im Soo-jung
- Awarded for: Best performance by an actress in a supporting role in a South Korean series
- Country: South Korea
- Presented by: Baeksang Arts Awards
- Most recent winner: Im Soo-jung; Low Life (2026)
- Website: baeksangartsawards

The Baeksang Arts Award for Best Supporting Actress – Television (Korean: 백상예술대상 TV부문 여자 조연상; RR: Baeksang Yesul Daesang TV Bumun Yeoja Joyeonsang) is an award presented annually at the Baeksang Arts Awards ceremony organised by Ilgan Sports and JTBC Plus, affiliates of JoongAng Ilbo, usually in the second quarter of each year in Seoul.

== Winners and nominees ==
Table key
‡	Indicates the winner

=== 2010s ===
Year	Winner	Television series	Original title	Role(s)	Network
2018 (54th)	Ye Ji-won ‡	Should We Kiss First?	키스 먼저 할까요?	Lee Mi-ra	SBS
2018 (54th)	Na Young-hee	My Golden Life	황금빛 내 인생	Noh Myung-hee	KBS2
2018 (54th)	Ra Mi-ran	Avengers Social Club	부암동 복수자들	Hong Do-hee	tvN
2018 (54th)	Song Ha-yoon	Fight for My Way	쌈 마이웨이	Baek Seol-hee	KBS2
2018 (54th)	Jeon Hye-jin	Misty	미스티	Seo Eun-joo	JTBC
2019 (55th)	Lee Jung-eun ‡	The Light in Your Eyes	눈이 부시게	Moon Jung-eun	JTBC
2019 (55th)	Kim Min-jung	Mr. Sunshine	미스터 션샤인	Lee Yang-hwa / Kudo Hina	tvN
2019 (55th)	Oh Na-ra	My Mister	나의 아저씨	Jung-hee	tvN
2019 (55th)	Yoon Se-ah	Sky Castle	SKY 캐슬	No Seung-hye	JTBC
2019 (55th)	Lee Da-hee	The Beauty Inside	뷰티 인사이드	Kang Sa-ra	JTBC

=== 2020s ===
Year	Winner and nominees	Television series	Original title	Role(s)	Network
2020 (56th)	Kim Sun-young ‡	Crash Landing on You	사랑의 불시착	Na Wol-sook	tvN
2020 (56th)	Kwon Nara	Itaewon Class	이태원 클라쓰	Oh Soo-ah	JTBC
2020 (56th)	Seo Ji-hye	Crash Landing on You	사랑의 불시착	Seo Dan	tvN
2020 (56th)	Son Dam-bi	When the Camellia Blooms	동백꽃 필 무렵	Choi Hyang-mi / Choi Go-eun	KBS2
2020 (56th)	Yeom Hye-ran	When the Camellia Blooms	동백꽃 필 무렵	Hong Ja-young	KBS2
2021 (57th)	Yeom Hye-ran‡	The Uncanny Counter	경이로운 소문	Choo Mae-ok	OCN
2021 (57th)	Park Ha-sun	Birthcare Center	산후조리원	Cho Eun-jeong	tvN
2021 (57th)	Jang Young-nam	It's Okay to Not Be Okay	사이코지만 괜찮아	Park Haeng-ja	tvN
2021 (57th)	Cha Chung-hwa	Mr. Queen	철인왕후	Court Lady Choi	tvN
2021 (57th)	Shin Eun-kyung	The Penthouse: War in Life	펜트하우스	Kang Ma-ri	SBS
2022 (58th)	Kim Shin-rok	Hellbound‡	지옥	Park Jeong-ja	Netflix
2022 (58th)	Kang Mal-geum	Thirty-Nine	서른, 아홉	Cha Mi-hyun	JTBC
2022 (58th)	Kim Joo-ryoung	Squid Game	오징어 게임	Han Mi-nyeo	Netflix
2022 (58th)	Ok Ja-yeon	Mine	마인:MINE	Kang Ja-kyung / Lee Hye-jin	tvN
2022 (58th)	Jang Hye-jin	The Red Sleeve	옷소매 붉은 끝동	Court Lady Seo	MBC
2023 (59th)	Lim Ji-yeon	The Glory	더 글로리	Park Yeon-jin	Netflix
2023 (59th)	Kim Shin-rok	Reborn Rich	재벌집 막내아들	Jin Hwa-young	JTBC
2023 (59th)	Yeom Hye-ran	The Glory	더 글로리	Kang Hyeon-nam	Netflix
2023 (59th)	Lee El	My Liberation Notes	나의 해방일지	Yeom Ki-jeong	JTBC
2023 (59th)	Jung Eun-chae	Anna	안나	Lee Hyeon-ju	Coupang Play
2024 (60th)	Yeom Hye-ran ‡	Mask Girl	마스크걸	Kim Kyung-ja	Netflix
2024 (60th)	Kang Mal-geum	The Good Bad Mother	나쁜엄마	Jung Gum-ja	JTBC
2024 (60th)	Shin Dong-mi	Welcome to Samdal-ri	웰컴투 삼달리	Cho Jin-dal	JTBC
2024 (60th)	Lee Jung-eun	A Bloody Lucky Day	운수 오진 날	Hwang Soon-kyu	tvN, TVING
2024 (60th)	Joo Min-kyung	Behind Your Touch	힙하게	Bae Ok-hee	JTBC
2025 (61st)	Yeom Hye-ran ‡	When Life Gives You Tangerines	폭싹 속았수다	Jeon Gwang-rye	Netflix
2025 (61st)	Kim Gook-hee	Family Matters	가족계획	Oh Gil-ja	Coupang Play
2025 (61st)	Kim Jae-hwa	The Tale of Lady Ok	옥씨부인전	Mak Sim	JTBC
2025 (61st)	Oh Gyeong-hwa	Jeongnyeon: The Star Is Born	정년이	Yoon Jung-ja	tvN
2025 (61st)	Jung Eun-chae	Jeongnyeon: The Star Is Born	정년이	Moon Ok-gyeong	tvN
2026 (62nd)	Im Soo-jung ‡	Low Life	파인: 촌뜨기들	Yang Jung-sook	Disney+
2026 (62nd)	Myung Se-bin	The Dream Life of Mr. Kim	서울 자가에 대기업 다니는 김 부장 이야기	Park Ha-jin	JTBC
2026 (62nd)	Won Mi-kyung	Our Unwritten Seoul	미지의 서울	Kim Ro-sa / Hyeon Sang-wol	tvN
2026 (62nd)	Lee E-dam	The Art of Sarah	레이디 두아	Kim Mi-jeong	Netflix
2026 (62nd)	Ha Yoon-kyung	Undercover Miss Hong	언더커버 미쓰홍	Go Bok-hee	tvN

== Sources ==
- "Baeksang Arts Awards Nominees and Winners Lists". Naver Movie (in Korean).
- "Baeksang Arts Awards Winners Lists". Baeksang Arts Awards (in Korean).
