= The Glory (TV series) =

2022–2023 South Korean television series

- Promotional poster
- Hangul: 더 글로리
- RR: Deo geullori
- MR: Tŏ kŭllori
- Genre: Revenge; Psychological thriller
- Written by: Kim Eun-sook
- Directed by: Ahn Gil-ho
- Starring: Song Hye-kyo; Lee Do-hyun; Lim Ji-yeon; Yeom Hye-ran; Park Sung-hoon; Jung Sung-il
- Music by: Kim Joon-seok (movie closer); Jung Se-rin (movie closer)
- Country of origin: South Korea
- Original language: Korean
- No. of episodes: 16

Production
- Executive producers: Kim Seon-tae; Kim Beom-rae; Kim Eun-sook; Ahn Gil-ho (CP)
- Producers: Yoon Ha-rim; Kim Young-kyu
- Cinematography: Jang Jong-kyung
- Editors: Han Ji-woo; Park Eun-mi
- Running time: 47–72 minutes
- Production companies: Hwa&Dam Pictures; Studio Dragon

Original release
- Network: Netflix
- Release: December 30, 2022 – March 10, 2023

The Glory (Korean: 더 글로리) is a South Korean revenge psychological thriller television series written by Kim Eun-sook and directed by Ahn Gil-ho for Netflix. Song Hye-kyo, Lee Do-hyun, Lim Ji-yeon, Yeom Hye-ran, Park Sung-hoon, and Jung Sung-il round out the ensemble cast.

The series was divided into two parts: Part 1 was released on December 30, 2022, and Part 2 was released on March 10, 2023, both to critical acclaim and viewership success. It received eight nominations at the 59th Baeksang Arts Awards, winning three: Best Drama, Best Actress for Song Hye-kyo, and Best Supporting Actress for Lim Ji-yeon.

== Premise ==
Moon Dong-eun, a former victim of school violence, plans and seeks revenge on her bullies after taking up a job as a homeroom teacher at the elementary school of the bully leader's child (Ha Ye-sol). Some scenes are based on a true event in 2006 when a group of middle schoolers from Cheongju, South Korea, extorted money from their classmate for about a month, repeatedly beating and burning her using objects in the process.

== Cast ==
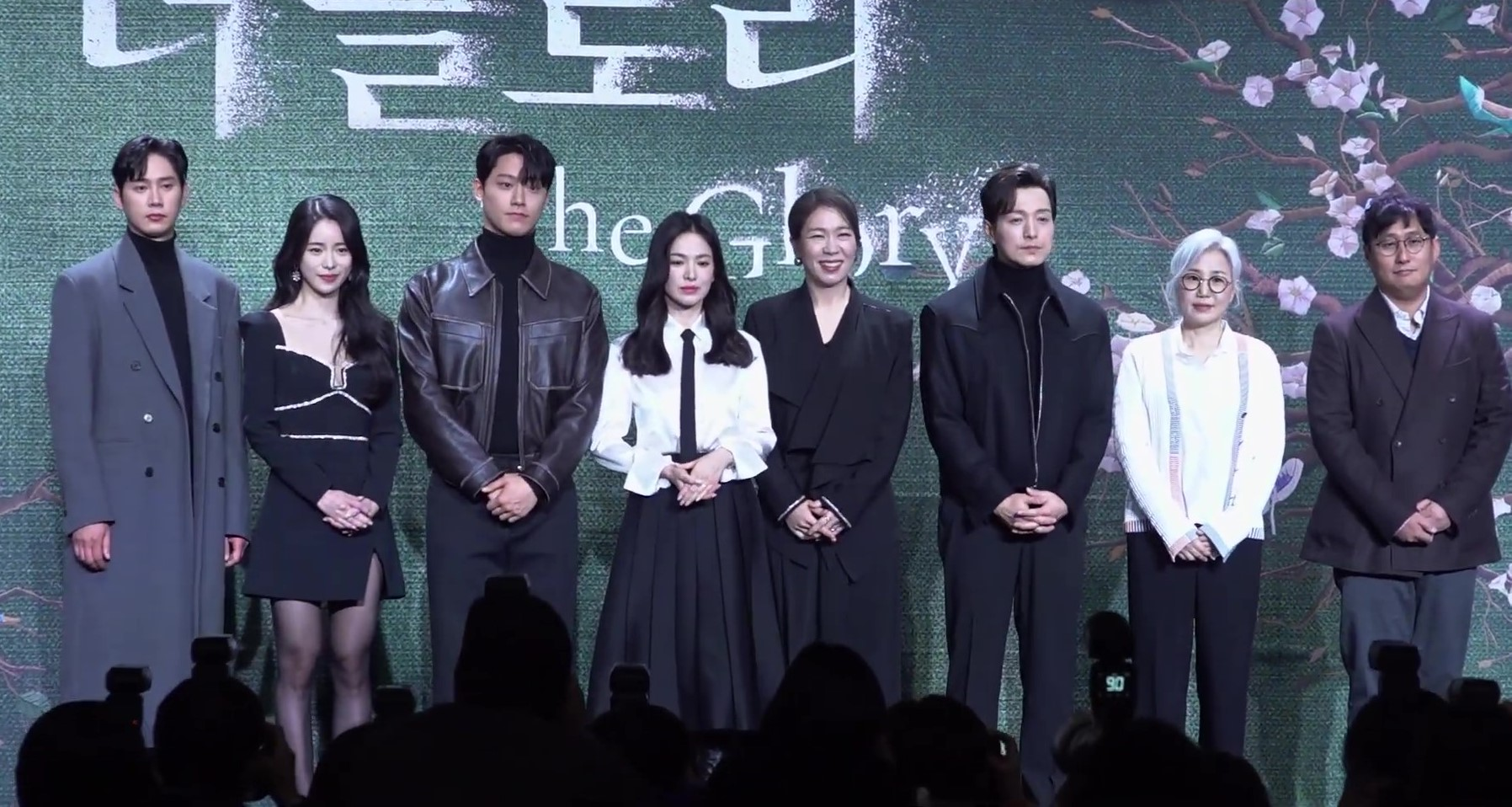
Cast members, writer and director at a December 2022 press conference. From left to right: Park Sung-hoon, Lim Ji-yeon, Lee Do-hyun, Song Hye-kyo, Yeom Hye-ran, Jung Sung-il, writer Kim Eun-sook and director Ahn Gil-ho.

=== Main ===
- Song Hye-kyo as Moon Dong-eun
  - Jung Ji-so as young Dong-eun

A homeroom teacher at Semyeong Elementary School, Dong-eun was the victim of relentless bullying and physical abuse during high school at the hands of Yeon-jin and her group. Forced to drop out, she later devises an elaborate plan of revenge against those who tormented her. After resigning from her teaching position, she enrolls in an architecture program and becomes a chartered architect, fulfilling her dream from high school.

- Lee Do-hyun as Joo Yeo-jeong

A plastic surgeon formerly employed at Seoul Joo General Hospital, of which his mother is director. Yeo-jeong taught Dong-eun the game Go and has developed romantic feelings for her since their university years. He ultimately assists in her revenge plan, driven by personal motives related to his own quest for justice after the murder of his father, a doctor killed by a patient he was trying to save.

- Lim Ji-yeon as Park Yeon-jin
  - Shin Ye-eun as young Yeon-jin

A weather presenter who was the ringleader of the group that bullied Dong-eun in high school. Yeon-jin conceals the truth about her daughter's paternity, passing off Ye-sol as her wealthy husband's. Responsible for numerous cruel acts, including the death of another bullying victim, her crimes are eventually exposed. She is arrested and forced to endure consequences mirroring the suffering she once inflicted.

- Yeom Hye-ran as Kang Hyeon-nam

A housekeeper formerly employed by the president of Semyeong Foundation. A victim of domestic abuse alongside her teenage daughter, Hyeon-nam agrees to assist Dong-eun in gathering intelligence for her revenge plan in exchange for help escaping her abusive household.

- Park Sung-hoon as Jeon Jae-joon
  - Song Byeong-geun as young Jae-joon

The color-blind heir to a series of luxury businesses, including a country club, duty-free shop, boutique and resort. Jae-joon was part of the group that tormented Dong-eun in high school and is the biological father of Yeon-jin's daughter, Ye-sol, whose custody he later seeks.

- Jung Sung-il as Ha Do-yeong

The CEO of Jaepyeong Construction and husband of Yeon-jin. Unaware of his wife's past, Do-yeong becomes entangled in Dong-eun's revenge scheme and gradually uncovers Yeon-jin's history of violence and deceit. Disillusioned by his wife's lack of remorse, he divorces her and relocates to the United Kingdom, enrolling Ye-sol in school there in hopes of giving her a better future.

=== Supporting ===
==== Sunghan High School (2004–2006) ====
- Cha Joo-young as Choi Hye-jeong
  - Song Ji-woo as young Hye-jeong

A flight attendant whose parents operate a dry cleaning business. Though a member of the group that bullied Dong-eun during high school, Hye-jeong held the lowest status among them due to her comparatively modest background. Her involvement in the abuse was largely driven by a desire to maintain her place within the group's social hierarchy. She has unrequited feelings for Jae-joon.

- Kim Hieora as Lee Sa-ra
  - Bae Gang-hee as young Sa-ra

A church choir member and the daughter of a wealthy pastor. Despite her religious upbringing, Sa-ra developed a serious drug addiction and later pursued a career as a well-known abstract artist. She actively participated in the abuse of Dong-eun during their school years.

- Kim Gun-woo as Son Myeong-oh
  - Seo Woo-hyuk young Myeong-oh

A former classmate who participated in the abuse of Dong-eun. Lacking the wealth and connections of his peers, Myeong-oh finds work as an errand runner for Jae-joon and as a drug supplier to Sa-ra. His loyalty to the group stems more from opportunism than influence.

- Lee So-ee as Yoon So-hee

A student at Sunghan High School who suffered persistent bullying and abuse at the hands of Yeon-jin's group before Dong-eun became their next target.

- Jeon Soo-ah as Ahn Jung-mi

The school nurse at Sunghan High School and the only adult who showed support for Dong-eun during her time at the school. Her concern for Dong-eun contrasts with the inaction of other faculty members.

- Park Yoon-hee as Kim Jong-moon

Dong-eun's former homeroom teacher at Sunghan High School. He showed clear favoritism toward Yeon-jin's group and mistreated Dong-eun, having accepted bribes from the bullies' parents to overlook their misconduct.

- Ahn So-yo as Kim Kyeong-ran
  - Lee Seo-young as young Kyeong-ran

A shop assistant at a boutique owned by Jae-joon and Dong-eun's former friend. Following Dong-eun's departure from school, she became the group's next primary target of bullying.

==== People around Park Yeon-jin ====
- Oh Ji-yul as Ha Ye-sol

The daughter of Yeon-jin and Ha Do-yeong, though her biological father is later revealed to be Jae-joon. Ye-sol is colorblind like her father and attends Semyeong Elementary School. Following the events of the series, Ye-sol is enrolled in a public school in the United Kingdom.

- Yoon Da-gyeong as Hong Young-ae

Yeon-jin's mother who is a devout believer in Korean shamanism. Young-ae is complicit in her daughter's behavior and uses her wealth and connections to cover them.

- Lee Hae-young as Shin Young-joon

A corrupt superintendent and longtime associate of Young-ae. Young-joon assists in concealing Yeon-jin's criminal activities.

==== People around Moon Dong-eun ====
- Park Ji-a as Jung Mi-hee

Dong-eun's mother, who worked as a barber. Mi-hee abandoned Dong-eun in exchange for bribes and has a long history of alcohol dependency. Her neglect and betrayal contribute significantly to Dong-eun's emotional trauma.

- Heo Dong-won as Chu Jeong-ho

A teacher at Semyeong Elementary School who feels threatened by Dong-eun's hire. He is later exposed as a child predator.

- Kang Gil-woo as Kim Soo-han

Dong-eun's senior and the son of Kim Jong-moon, Dong-eun's former homeroom teacher.

- Son Sook as Old Lady (Pan-Geum)

An elderly woman who manages an estate office and owns Eden Villa in Semyeong. She rents an apartment to Dong-eun.

- Son Na-young as Goo Sung-hee

A travel agency employee who previously worked at the same factory as Dong-eun.

==== People around Kang Hyeon-nam ====
- Choi Soo-in as Lee Seon-ah

Hyeon-nam's teenage daughter, who endures physical abuse alongside her mother at the hands of her father. With Dong-eun's help, she is eventually able to escape the abusive environment and pursue her education abroad in the United States.

- Ryu Seong-hyun as Lee Seok-jae

Hyeon-nam's husband, who is physically abusive toward his wife and daughter. He struggles with gambling addiction and alcoholism, being the sole cause of the family's suffering.

==== People around Joo Yeo-jeong ====
- Kim Jung-young as Park Sang-im

Yeo-jeong's mother and the current director of Seoul Joo General Hospital.

- Cho Min-wook as Kim Jong-heon

Yeo-jeong's senior during his time at the hospital.

- Choi Kwang-il as Joo Sung-hak

Yeo-jeong's father, formerly the chief director of Seoul Joo General Hospital and a surgeon by profession. Sung-hak was murdered by Yeong-cheon, a former patient, which deeply impacts Yeo-jeong and influences his involvement in Dong-eun's revenge plan.

==== Others ====
- Lee Byung-joon as Lee Gil-sung

A pastor and Sa-ra's father.

- Son Kang-kuk as Choi Dong-kyu

A Detective Constable.

- Noh Kyung (Part 2)
- Oh Min-ae as Do-yeong's mother
- Kim Seon-hwa as Lee Sa-ra's mother
- Jeon Jin-oh as Young-joon's subordinate

=== Special appearance ===
- Hwang Kwang-hee as radio show host
- Lee Moo-saeng as Kang Yeong-cheon

A patient who murdered Yeo-jeong's father.

- Lee Joong-ok as Tae-wook

Hye-jeong's lover.

- Kim Seung-hwa as Hye-jeong's junior

== Episodes ==
Series overview
Season	Episodes		Originally released
1	16	8	December 30, 2022
1	16	8	March 10, 2023

No.	Episode	Directed by	Written by	Original release date
Part 1
1	Episode 1	Ahn Gil-ho	Kim Eun-sook	December 30, 2022
In 2004, 17-year-old high school student Moon Dong-eun is ruthlessly bullied and tortured by a group of her rich peers led by Park Yeon-jin and including Jeon Jae-joon, Choi Hye-jeong, Lee Sa-ra, and Son Myeong-oh. Dong-eun files a police report, but Yeon-jin's mother, Young-ae, uses her connections with Young-joon, a high-ranking police officer, to cover up the incidents. After the school nurse, Dong-eun's only supporter, resigns, Dong-eun applies to drop out of school and lists the group as the reason. Their homeroom teacher, Jong-moon, beats her in front of other staff for "lying". Young-ae bribes Dong-eun's mother, Jeong Mi-hee, to change the reason on Dong-eun's dropout form to "maladjustment". After accepting the bribe, Mi-hee abandons Dong-eun and moves away. Over the next few years, Dong-eun works at a textile factory, befriends fellow worker Sung-hee, acquires a GED certificate, and enrolls in university to study education. In 2022, an adult Dong-eun watches Yeon-jin, now a weather presenter, on television, surrounded by photographs of those who have wronged her.
2	Episode 2	Ahn Gil-ho	Kim Eun-sook	December 30, 2022
While in university, Dong-eun gathers information on the group. Jae-joon inherits a country club and upscale clothing boutique, and has an affair with Yeon-jin; Hye-jeong becomes a flight attendant and has unrequited feelings for Jae-joon; Sa-ra becomes a famous abstract artist and drug addict; Myeong-oh becomes Jae-joon's lackey and Sa-ra's drug dealer. Dong-eun befriends Joo Yeo-jeong, a medical intern who develops a crush on her and teaches her the game Go. Yeon-jin marries Ha Do-yeong, the CEO of a large construction company, and has a daughter, Ha Ye-sol. After graduating, Dong-eun abruptly leaves without telling Yeo-jeong. She meets Myeong-oh and tells him she has information he can use to make money. She leases an apartment in Semyeong overlooking Yeon-jin's house. One night, while searching the bins at the house of Semyeong Foundation's chairman, Dong-eun is confronted by housekeeper Kang Hyeon-nam. Rather than turn Dong-eun in, Hyeon-nam offers to help Dong-eun if she kills Seok-jae, her abusive husband, in return.
3	Episode 3	Ahn Gil-ho	Kim Eun-sook	December 30, 2022
Dong-eun hires Hyeon-nam as an assistant to help gather information on the group and begins tutoring her daughter, Seon-ah. She realizes that Ye-sol is colorblind, a trait shared by Jae-joon. She starts playing Go at the club Do-yeong goes to, where her skill intrigues him. She also runs into Yeo-jeong by chance; Yeo-jeong is now a plastic surgeon. Dong-eun tells Myeong-oh that she knows who pushed Yoon So-hee, a student bullied by the group before they targeted Dong-eun, to her death. She offers that information in exchange for his help; he gives her Jae-joon's hair samples. The bullies gather at the school for an alumni awards ceremony, where Dong-eun meets them again. Dong-eun uses the information Hyeon-nam gathered to blackmail the chairman of the Semyeong school district into transferring to teach at the elementary school Ye-sol attends.
4	Episode 4	Ahn Gil-ho	Kim Eun-sook	December 30, 2022
Yeon-jin discovers that Dong-eun is Ye-sol's new homeroom teacher and that their former teacher, Jong-moon, died shortly after meeting Dong-eun, causing her to panic. Dong-eun had told Soo-han, Jong-moon's son, that she planned to expose Jong-moon's past abuse toward her publicly. To protect his own career, Soo-han killed his father. Dong-eun receives new information about So-hee from Jung-mi, the former school nurse. Myeong-oh visits the mortuary and finds So-hee's unclaimed body, as her parents disputed the police's ruling of suicide. Do-yeong starts playing with Dong-eun at the Go club, just as she had intended.
5	Episode 5	Ahn Gil-ho	Kim Eun-sook	December 30, 2022
Dong-eun reveals to Yeon-jin that she knows about Ye-sol's color blindness. Jae-joon receives an envelope containing Ye-sol's toothbrush. Yeon-jin hires Young-joon, now a corrupt detective, to investigate Dong-eun. Meanwhile, Hyeon-nam steals Hye-jeong's phone and gives it to Dong-eun. Dong-eun blackmails Sa-ra for cash and meets with Yeo-jeong after years of no contact, apologizing for how she treated him. Yeo-jeong, still in love with her, cheekily tells her he would make a good partner. Dong-eun responds that she does not need a prince, but an "executioner". She later tells Myeong-oh the person who pushed So-hee. Myeong-oh contacts the rest of the group and Do-yeong, planning to flee to Russia, but is attacked by an unknown assailant before he can do so.
6	Episode 6	Ahn Gil-ho	Kim Eun-sook	December 30, 2022
Yeo-jeong opens his own practice in Semyeong, having decided to follow Dong-eun. Myeong-oh goes missing. While driving, Hyeon-nam warns Dong-eun that she is being followed. She leads the men into a collision and exchanges numbers with them. Unbeknownst to her, they secretly work for Young-joon. Suspicious, Dong-eun questions Hyeon-nam about why she was following her, but realizes she was only fulfilling her duties, and the two reconcile. Do-yeong receives a photograph of himself with Dong-eun. While getting her car repaired, the sound of grilling meat triggers Dong-eun's PTSD, causing a panic attack. She visits Yeo-jeong's clinic for comfort. Jae-joon discovers Ye-sol is his biological daughter. Hye-jeong receives an envelope containing private images from her phone. Dong-eun reveals her revenge plan to Yeo-jeong. When he tries to dissuade her, she reveals the extensive scarring on her body. Shocked and disturbed, Yeo-jeong offers to be her "executioner".
7	Episode 7	Ahn Gil-ho	Kim Eun-sook	December 30, 2022
Do-yeong grows suspicious of Yeon-jin and the group. Yeo-jeong's mother, Sang-im, receives a letter from Kang Yeong-cheon, the imprisoned murderer of Yeo-jeong's father, and discovers that he has been taunting her son. Yeo-jeong fantasizes about killing Yeong-cheon, revealing his own dark side. Dong-eun plans to use the money from Sa-ra to send Seon-ah abroad to study in the United States so she is safe. Jae-joon rejects Hye-jeong and plots to gain custody of Ye-sol, which would require Yeon-jin and Do-yeong to divorce. Before Myeong-oh's disappearance, Dong-eun had told him that So-hee was found holding Yeon-jin's name tag the day she died. Jae-joon confronts Yeon-jin with Ye-sol's paternity, and they kiss. Do-yeong visits Ye-sol's classroom, finds Jae-joon there, and is startled to see Ye-sol's teacher is Dong-eun.
8	Episode 8	Ahn Gil-ho	Kim Eun-sook	December 30, 2022
Dong-eun coerces Hye-jeong into reporting Myeong-oh's disappearance to the police and tells Jae-joon that she sent him Ye-sol's toothbrush. Do-yeong learns from Hye-jeong that Yeon-jin was a malicious bully to Dong-eun and others in the past. Yeo-jeong meets Do-yeong for the first time, plays Go with him, and reports back to Dong-eun. Yeon-jin meets and once again bribes Dong-eun's mother to have leverage over Dong-eun. Sang-im visits Yeong-cheon in prison to tell him to stop the letters. Do-yeong asks Dong-eun for her side of the story. Yeon-jin breaks into Dong-eun's apartment and finds her wall of photographs, then turns to see that Do-yeong has entered as well. Yeo-jeong discovers that So-hee's body is not in the mortuary.
Part 2
9	Episode 9	Ahn Gil-ho	Kim Eun-sook	March 10, 2023
Before going missing, Myeong-oh had tried to blackmail both the group over So-hee's death and Dong-eun by threatening to expose her plans. In the present, Do-yeong presses Yeon-jin for answers, but she deflects blame. Yeo-jeong learns that So-hee's body had been moved to the morgue freezer on his father's orders in hopes that the case would be reopened. Dong-eun moves in with Yeo-jeong. Myeong-oh's disappearance becomes a criminal investigation, and the group begins to suspect Yeon-jin. Do-yeong receives the evidence of Yeon-jin's infidelity that Myeong-oh sent before disappearing. Flashbacks reveal that Dong-eun sent Yeon-jin's name tag found with So-hee to the police, but Young-joon gave it to Young-ae, who concealed it to cover for her daughter. So-hee is also revealed to have been pregnant at the time of her death. Dong-eun notices a missing photo of Seok-jae from her wall; Yeon-jin uses it to track down Hyeon-nam.
10	Episode 10	Ahn Gil-ho	Kim Eun-sook	March 10, 2023
Yeon-jin threatens Hyeon-nam into working for her, unaware that Dong-eun had already warned Hyeon-nam in advance. Acting on Yeon-jin's tip, Mi-hee shows up at Dong-eun's school. Dong-eun has Hye-jeong lure Yeon-jin to Yeo-jeong's clinic and arranges for Jung-mi to care for Seon-ah. Jae-joon discovers that CCTV footage from his boutique on the night of Myeong-oh's disappearance has been deleted. As more truths about Yeon-jin come to light, Do-yeong invites Dong-eun to dinner. She wears a sleeveless dress, shocking Do-yeong with her burn scars. While administering anesthesia before a cosmetic procedure, Yeo-jeong questions Yeon-jin about Myeong-oh. It is revealed that, when Myeong-oh blackmailed her about So-hee's death at Jae-joon's boutique, she struck him with a bottle in a fit of rage and left him for dead.
11	Episode 11	Ahn Gil-ho	Kim Eun-sook	March 10, 2023
After leaving the scene, Yeon-jin enlists Young-joon to dispose of Myeong-oh's body. However, he instead stores the body in an abandoned funeral home to gain leverage over Yeon-jin and Young-ae. Disoriented, Yeon-jin flees from Yeo-jeong's clinic upon waking. During dinner, Dong-eun tells Do-yeong she wants Yeon-jin to lose everyone close to her, but he replies that he does not intend to divorce her yet. At home, Do-yeong confronts Yeon-jin about her affair with Jae-joon. Jae-joon attempts to recover the deleted CCTV footage from his boutique. Young-ae requests that Young-joon find a legal way to dispose of So-hee's frozen body. Yeo-jeong purchases the abandoned funeral home. After discovering that Hyeon-nam is receiving money from Yeon-jin, Seok-jae blackmails Young-ae. Hye-jeong finds a partial recording of Myeong-oh's ill-fated meeting with Yeon-jin.
12	Episode 12	Ahn Gil-ho	Kim Eun-sook	March 10, 2023
Dong-eun and Yeo-jeong locate Myeong-oh's body at the funeral home. It is revealed that Yeo-jeong had collected DNA samples from Yeon-jin at the clinic. Yeon-jin begins hallucinating So-hee. Dong-eun tells Jae-joon that her colleague, Mr. Chu, has been taking upskirt photos of students, including Ye-sol. In response, Jae-joon assaults Mr. Chu at the school. Kyung-ran, a shop assistant at Jae-joon's boutique, is revealed to possess the bottle Yeon-jin used to strike Myeong-oh. At the police station, Jae-joon and Do-yeong get into a physical altercation over Ye-sol. Do-yeong later confronts Yeon-jin about Ye-sol's paternity and her affair, effectively ending their marriage. At school, Dong-eun is confronted by parents turned against her by Mi-hee. She plants drugs at the church run by Sa-ra's father, causing Sa-ra to relapse and hallucinate in front of the congregation. Yeon-jin learns that an anonymous letter has been posted online accusing her of bullying.
13	Episode 13	Ahn Gil-ho	Kim Eun-sook	March 10, 2023
A video of Sa-ra's relapse and the anonymous letter go viral. Jae-joon discovers that the hard drive containing footage was swapped, not deleted. Hye-jeong shows him Myeong-oh's recording; he recognizes it was taken in his boutique, then seduces Hye-jeong. Dong-eun warns Kyung-ran not to interfere with her plan to prove Yeon-jin's involvement in Myeong-oh's murder. Young-ae turns to a shaman to deal with Seok-jae. Hye-jeong tells Sa-ra that Yeon-jin leaked a story about her tax evasion to distract the media from the bullying allegations. Dong-eun resigns from her teaching position. Young-joon attempts to blackmail Yeon-jin with Myeong-oh's murder, unaware that Dong-eun has already arranged for it to be discovered at the site of So-hee's death. Dong-eun confronts her mother, who, in a drunken rage, starts a fire in her apartment while being recorded.
14	Episode 14	Ahn Gil-ho	Kim Eun-sook	March 10, 2023
Using the recording of the apartment fire, Dong-eun successfully has her mother committed to a mental institution. Do-yeong reads the viral letter and is horrified by the extent of Yeon-jin's bullying. Dong-eun gives him So-hee's mother's address. Yeon-jin convinces Jae-joon to give her an alibi for the day of Myeong-oh's disappearance. Jae-joon shows Do-yeong a copy of Myeong-oh's recording, offering to withhold it from the police if he divorces Yeon-jin and relinquishes custody of Ye-sol. He also implies Yeon-jin is responsible for So-hee's death, further disturbing Do-yeong. Young-ae runs over Seok-jae and threatens Young-joon into cooperating. Realizing she left evidence, Yeon-jin returns to the funeral home, only to find Yeo-jeong there. Dong-eun tips off the lead detective about a lighter found near So-hee's body. During a ritual, the shaman reenacts So-hee's final moments, revealing that Yeon-jin set her clothes on fire, leading to a scuffle that ended with So-hee being pushed off the rooftop.
15	Episode 15	Ahn Gil-ho	Kim Eun-sook	March 10, 2023
The shaman appears to see So-hee's ghost beside Dong-eun before suddenly collapsing and dying from what bystanders interpret as divine punishment. Yeon-jin attempts to intimidate Hyeon-nam, but Hyeon-nam slaps her in front of Do-yeong. He gives Yeon-jin an ultimatum to apologize to So-hee's mother; when she refuses, he initiates divorce proceedings. After Sa-ra leaks past video footage of Yeon-jin bullying So-hee, Yeon-jin resigns from her job. Ye-sol rejects her mother, further devastating Yeon-jin. At Myeong-oh's funeral, the clique turns on each other, culminating in Sa-ra stabbing Hye-jeong in the neck. Sa-ra is charged with attempted murder. Yeo-jeong learns that Jae-joon raped So-hee, causing her pregnancy. Dong-eun and Kyung-ran are revealed to have been friends before Dong-eun was bullied. Jae-joon tells Hye-jeong, now mute from her injuries, that he deleted Myeong-oh's recording. Meanwhile, Yeo-jeong had planted Yeon-jin's DNA on Myeong-oh's body, which matches DNA recovered from the lighter found near So-hee. In an effort to save herself, Young-ae gives Dong-eun Yeon-jin's nametag. Dong-eun discovers that Yeo-jeong had been appointed as So-hee's mother's legal guardian long before she revealed her revenge plans to him.
16	Episode 16	Ahn Gil-ho	Kim Eun-sook	March 10, 2023
Yeo-jeong admits he had known about Dong-eun's motives from the beginning and was aware that she approached him intentionally. Dong-eun confesses that her initial goal was to preserve So-hee's body. Yeon-jin and Young-ae are arrested on suspicion of murder, with Yeon-jin becoming mentally unstable. Lead Detective Choi realizes Dong-eun orchestrated the events but stays quiet and closes the case. Young-joon is beaten to death by his own subordinates over money. With Dong-eun's help, Hye-jeong poisons Jae-joon's eye medication, resulting in his blindness. Jae-joon drowns after Do-yeong pushes him into a vat of wet concrete, after which Do-yeong and Ye-sol relocate to the United Kingdom. So-hee is finally laid to rest. Flashbacks reveal that Myeong-oh initially survived and was found by Kyung-ran, who, overwhelmed by traumatic memories of his assault, delivered the fatal blow with the same bottle. Kyung-ran then contacted Dong-eun, who used the situation to frame Yeon-jin. In the present, Dong-eun prepares to end her life at the site of So-hee's death but is stopped by Sang-im, who pleads with her to stay and help Yeo-jeong. Six months later, Dong-eun has come to terms with her past and no longer hides her scars. She reunites with Yeo-jeong and offers to help him exact revenge. Yeo-jeong becomes a doctor at Jisan Prison, where Yeong-cheon is transferred after being attacked by other inmates. Dong-eun begins teaching at the facility. When Yeong-cheon sees Yeo-jeong, he remembers his warning that the revenge would not end until Yeong-cheon is dead. Having fulfilled their respective vengeances, Dong-eun and Yeo-jeong profess their love for each other.

== Production ==
=== Development ===
Preparation for the series began in January 2021. Entirely pre-produced by Hwa&Dam Pictures and its parent company Studio Dragon, it is a Netflix original series. It is said that the series will be produced in two seasons, 8 episodes per season for a total of 16 episodes.

On December 20, 2022, the director announced at the drama's press conference that Part 2 will be released in March 2023.

=== Casting ===
In July 2022, The Glory confirmed production with ensemble casting of Song Hye-kyo, Lee Do-hyun, Lim Ji-yeon, Yeom Hye-ran, Park Sung-hoon, and Jung Sung-il.

== Reception ==
=== Critical response ===
On the review aggregator website Rotten Tomatoes, 82% of 112 critics' reviews are positive, with an average rating of 7.6/10.

Writing for Forbes, Joan MacDonald praised Song Hye-kyo for her "nuanced portrayal of Dong-eun" as well as Jung Ji-so who played teen Dong-eun, and wrote "The Glory features a fair share of unexpected plot twists, veering the story from almost horror to melodrama to murder mystery." Lakshana N. Palat, in his review for The Indian Express, praised the series' cinematography, music, and Song Hye-kyo's performance, stating, "It is one of her finest performances, if not her best." Chris Vognar of San Francisco Chronicle called the series "visually arresting", "carefully constructed" and "delights in every step".

Pierce Conran of South China Morning Post graded the series with 4 out of 5, appreciating its storyline. The Hindu's S. Poorvaja wrote, "Part 2 of The Glory, goes above and beyond, with its razor-sharp writing, compelling narrative, and impressive performances. And this is no easy feat, given that the story here has its focus trained on a rather complicated plan of revenge coming to fruition."

=== Viewership ===
Two days after the release of The Glory Part 1 on December 30, 2022, it ranked ninth globally on Netflix's TV shows category. On its third day, it reached fifth place on the most watched shows on Netflix worldwide. Two days after the release of The Glory Part 2 on March 10, 2023, it ranked second worldwide and became top one worldwide on its third day The series debuted at number three on the Netflix's Weekly Global Top 10 in non-English TV show category for the week December 26 – January 1, with 25.41 million hours viewed and subsequently ranked number one of the same list in the following week, January 2–8, accumulating 82.48 million viewing hours.

The series now ranked among the top 10 all-time Non-English TV series at #5 with 436.90 million hours watched in the first 28 days of release.

Media Play News, citing PlumResearch data, reported that The Glory attracted 2.2 million unique viewers on Netflix in the United States during the week ending April 2, 2023, with an average time spent of 216 minutes.

=== Awards and nominations ===
Name of the award ceremony, year presented, category, nominee(s) of the award, and the result of the nomination
Award ceremony	Year	Category	Nominee / Work	Result	Ref.
Asia Contents Awards & Global OTT Awards	2023	Best Actress	Song Hye-kyo	Nominated	
Asia Contents Awards & Global OTT Awards	2023	Best Supporting Actress	Lim Ji-yeon	Won	
Asia Contents Awards & Global OTT Awards	2023	Best Writer	Kim Eun-sook	Nominated	
Asia Contents Awards & Global OTT Awards	2023	Best Creative	The Glory	Nominated	
Asian Academy Creative Awards	2023	Best Actress in a Supporting Role (Grand Final Winners)	Lim Ji-yeon	Won	
Asian Academy Creative Awards	2023	Best Drama Series (Grand Final Winners)	The Glory	Won	
Baeksang Arts Awards
Baeksang Arts Awards	2023	Grand Prize – Television	The Glory	Nominated	
Baeksang Arts Awards	2023	Grand Prize – Television	Kim Eun-sook	Nominated	
Baeksang Arts Awards	2023	Best Drama	The Glory	Won	
Baeksang Arts Awards	2023	Best Actress	Song Hye-kyo	Won	
Baeksang Arts Awards	2023	Best Supporting Actor	Park Sung-hoon	Nominated	
Baeksang Arts Awards	2023	Best Supporting Actress	Yeom Hye-ran	Nominated	
Baeksang Arts Awards	2023	Best Supporting Actress	Lim Ji-yeon	Won	
Baeksang Arts Awards	2023	Best New Actor	Kim Gun-woo	Nominated	
Baeksang Arts Awards	2023	Best New Actress	Kim Hieora	Nominated	
Baeksang Arts Awards	2023	Best Screenplay	Kim Eun-sook	Nominated	
Baeksang Arts Awards	2023	Technical Award	Jang Jong-kyung (Cinematography)	Nominated	
Bechdel Day	2023	Bechdel Choice 10 – Series Category	The Glory	Won	
Bechdel Day	2023	Best Actress – Series Category	Lim Ji-yeon	Won	
Blue Dragon Series Awards	2023	Best Drama	The Glory	Nominated	
Blue Dragon Series Awards	2023	Blue Dragon's Choice (Grand Prize)	The Glory	Nominated	
Blue Dragon Series Awards	2023	Blue Dragon's Choice (Grand Prize)	Song Hye-kyo	Won	
Blue Dragon Series Awards	2023	Best Actress	Song Hye-kyo	Nominated	
Blue Dragon Series Awards	2023	Best Supporting Actor	Park Sung-hoon	Nominated	
Blue Dragon Series Awards	2023	Best Supporting Actress	Lim Ji-yeon	Won	
Blue Dragon Series Awards	2023	Best New Actress	Cha Joo-young	Nominated	
Brand Customer Loyalty Awards	2023	Best Actress – OTT	Song Hye-kyo	Won	
Brand Customer Loyalty Awards	2023	Best Actress – OTT	Lim Ji-yeon	Nominated	
Brand Customer Loyalty Awards	2023	Best Actor – OTT	Lee Do-hyun	Nominated	
Brand of the Year Awards	2023	Best Actress – OTT	Song Hye-kyo	Nominated	
Brand of the Year Awards	2023	Best Actress – OTT	Lim Ji-yeon	Won	
Brand of the Year Awards	2023	Best Actor – OTT	Lee Do-hyun	Won	
Brand of the Year Awards	2023	Actress of The Year – Scene Stealer	Park Ji-a	Nominated	
Consumer Day KCA Culture Entertainment Awards	2023	Drama Category – Best Picture	The Glory	Won	
Consumer Day KCA Culture Entertainment Awards	2023	Best Director	Ahn Gil-ho	Won	
Consumer Day KCA Culture Entertainment Awards	2023	Best Screenplay	Kim Eun-sook	Won	
Critics' Choice Awards	2024	Best Foreign Language Series	The Glory	Nominated	
Grand Bell Awards	2023	Best Series	The Glory	Nominated	
Grand Bell Awards	2023	Best Director Series	Ahn Gil-ho	Nominated	
Grand Bell Awards	2023	Best Actress Series	Song Hye-kyo	Nominated	
Global Film & Television Huading Awards	2023	Best Actor in Global Drama Series	Lee Do-hyun	Nominated	
Global Film & Television Huading Awards	2023	Most Popular Actress in Global Drama Series	Song Hye-kyo	Nominated	
Golden Cinema Film Festival	2023	Special OTT Performance Award	Cha Joo-young	Won	
Kinolights Awards	2023 (Note: First half of 2023)	Best Actress	Song Hye-kyo	2nd Place	
Kinolights Awards	2023	Best Actress	Lim Ji-yeon	1st Place	
Kinolights Awards	2023	Best Drama	The Glory	1st Place	
Seoul International Drama Awards	2023	Best Picture	The Glory	Won (Note: Tied with Extraordinary Attorney Woo)	
Korea Drama Awards	2023	Best Drama	The Glory	Won	
Korea Drama Awards	2023	Daesang	Song Hye-kyo	Nominated	
Korea Drama Awards	2023	Top Excellent Award, Actress	Lim Ji-yeon	Nominated	
Korea Drama Awards	2023	Excellent Award, Actor	Park Sung-hoon	Nominated	
Korea Drama Awards	2023	Best New Actor	Kim Gun-woo	Nominated	
Korea Drama Awards	2023	Best Director	Ahn Gil-ho	Won	

=== Listicle ===
Publisher	Year	Listicle	Placement	Ref.
Time	2023	The 10 Best Korean Dramas of 2023 on Netflix	Included	

=== Spotlighting school bullying ===
The series has been criticized for its graphic portrayal of violence, but it has also been praised for shedding a light on the ongoing abuses among students in South Korean schools. The violent scenes reminded the country's viewers of a 2006 incident where a middle schooler was beaten and burned by her classmates over the course of 20 days, not allowing her wounds to heal. She ended up being hospitalized for six weeks. One of the perpetrators was arrested afterward, while the school and its staff faced "administrative measures". Kim Eun-sook, the writer of the series, was initially inspired by her teenage daughter asking her which scenario she would find more distraught, that her daughter abuses someone else or that her daughter ends up as a victim of abuse. Since the show was aired, former employees in the South Korean school system have said that its depiction is realistic.

In March 2023, an anonymous online post accused the director of the series Ahn Gil-ho of physically assaulting a classmate when he studied in the Philippines in 1996. Ahn initially denied the allegation but ultimately admitted to it in a statement through his law firm. It said that Ahn and his friends confronted another group of students after hearing that the latter had made fun of Ahn's girlfriend at the time. Ahn wanted to seek forgiveness from those he had hurt and offered to make apologies in person.
