= The Uncanny Counter =

2020 South Korean television series

- Promotional poster for season 2
- Also known as: The Uncanny Counter 2: Counter Punch
- Hangul: 경이로운 소문
- Hanja: 驚異로운 所聞
- Lit.: Amazing So Mun; Amazing Rumor (Note: The word 소문 somun (pronounced [ˈsʰo̞ːmun]) in the native title of the series refers to the main protagonist So Mun (played by Jo Byeong-kyu); along with 경이로운 gyeong-iroun [kjʌ̹ŋiɾo̞un] (conjugated form of 경이롭다 gyeong-iropda [kjʌ̹ŋiɾo̞p̚t͈a̠] "amazing"/"marvelous"), the series' title roughly translates to Amazing So Mun. The name So Mun means "rumor" when taken literally, so the title can also be translated as Amazing Rumor. In the name So Mun, "So" is the surname and "Mun" is the given name.)
- RR: Gyeongiroun Somun
- MR: Kyŏngiroun Somun
- Genre: Fantasy; Mystery; Thriller; Action
- Based on: Amazing Rumor by Jang Yi
- Developed by: Studio Dragon (planning)
- Written by: Yeo Ji-na; Yoo Seon-dong; Kim Sae-bom
- Directed by: Yoo Seon-dong; Park Bong-seop
- Starring: Jo Byeong-kyu; Yoo Jun-sang; Kim Se-jeong; Yeom Hye-ran; Ahn Suk-hwan; Yoo In-soo
- Music by: Kim Woo-geun
- Opening theme: "The Uncanny Counter" by Kim Woo-geun
- Ending theme: "Close Your Eyes" by Hong Isaac; "Meet Again" by Kim Sejeong; "No Problem" by Dvwn; "Ready Set Go" by Cravity; "Once Again" by Kim Sejeong
- Country of origin: South Korea
- Original language: Korean
- No. of seasons: 2
- No. of episodes: 28

Production
- Executive producer: Kim Seon-tae
- Producers: Kim Jin-yi; Lee Hyang-bong; Bae Ik-hyuk
- Running time: 70 minutes
- Production companies: Neo Entertainment (S1); Betty & Creators (S2)

Original release
- Network: OCN (season 1)
- Release: November 28, 2020 – January 24, 2021
- Network: tvN (season 2)
- Release: July 29 – September 3, 2023

The Uncanny Counter (Korean: 경이로운 소문) is a 2020 South Korean television series starring Jo Byeong-kyu, Yoo Jun-sang, Kim Se-jeong, Yeom Hye-ran, Ahn Suk-hwan, and Yoo In-soo. Based on the Kakao Webtoon webtoon Amazing Rumor by Jang Yi, it centers on the titular character So Mun, a high school student with a disability who is enlisted to be part of the Counters, a group of paranormal hunters who search for and fight against evil spirits that escape from the afterlife to prey on humans. The first season aired from November 28, 2020, to January 24, 2021, on OCN's Saturdays and Sundays at 22:30 (KST) for 16 episodes. The second season aired from July 29 to September 3, 2023, on tvN's Saturdays and Sundays at 21:20 (KST) timeslot for 12 episodes. It is also available for streaming on Netflix in selected regions.

The series became the highest-rated OCN series so far.

== Series overview ==
Season	Episodes	Originally released			Time slot (KST)	Avg. viewership (millions)
Season	Episodes	First released	Last released	Network	Time slot (KST)	Avg. viewership (millions)
1	16	November 28, 2020	January 24, 2021	OCN	Saturday–Sunday 22:30	2.379
2	12	July 29, 2023	September 3, 2023	tvN	Saturday–Sunday 21:20	1.433

== Synopsis ==
=== Season 1 ===
In the fictional city of Jungjin, a group of four demon-hunters called the Counters bear the arduous task of searching for and banishing evil spirits (akgwi) (Note: 악귀; 惡鬼; akgwi; pronounced as [a̠k̚k͈ɥi] ~ [a̠k̚k͈y] literally "evil spirit" or "demon") that escaped the afterlife to gain immortality. These evil spirits possess local human hosts who have committed murder or have a strong desire to murder, encourage their host's desire to kill, and consume the spirit of the victim. The Counters were once in comas when a partner spirit from Yung, the boundary between the afterlife and the world of the living, possesses them and gives them perfectly healthy bodies and consciousness along with superhuman strength and supernatural abilities. Three of the Counters — Ga Mo-tak, Do Ha-na, and Chu Mae-ok — pose as workers in Eonni's Noodles, a noodle restaurant which serves as their hideout.

One day, the fourth Counter Jang Cheol-joong is killed in a battle against a strong "Level 3" (Note: In Jang Yi's Amazing Rumor universe, an akgwi can be classified into one of four "levels" (단계 dan-gye; literally "stage of progress"; pronounced as [ta̠nɡje̞] ~ [ta̠nɡe̞]) of increasing severity. Level 1 (1단계 ildan-gye) means the akgwi has possessed a human host only recently and is relatively easier to capture and banish. Level 2 (2단계 idan-gye) means the akgwi has committed at least one murder and is gaining more strength. Level 3 (3단계 samdan-gye) means the akgwi has become more powerful and has gained supernatural abilities, such as communicating with its host (who will now be able to speak into two voices), psychokinesis and psychometry. Level 4 (4단계 sadan-gye) means the akgwi and the host has become one, gains an additional ability and is near-invincible.) evil spirit. As his spirit gets consumed by his killer, his Yung partner Wi-gen struggles to find a new comatose human to possess. Uncannily, she is quickly drawn towards high school boy So Mun who, despite being disabled, is nevertheless perfectly healthy and alive. As soon as Wi-gen possesses him, the unknowing Mun starts noticing bizarre changes to his body and starts seeing Wi-gen in his dreams. Soon, Mun finds the answers in Eonni's Noodles, and as he becomes the replacement to the late Cheol-joong, he finds himself on a thrilling journey of battling against bloodthirsty demons, reconnecting to his past, and uncovering the ugly truth behind a major redevelopment project in Jungjin.

=== Season 2 ===
Three years after the events of Season 1, the Counters are actively catching evil spirits that still linger around Jungjin. Mo-tak has returned to the police force, thereby requiring the recruitment of another Counter since he found it difficult to balance between two places. At the same time, in China, three humans possessed by evil spirits — Hwang Pil-kwang, Gelli Choi and Wong Li Qiang — were hunted by the Chinese Counters but instead managed to kill them all, taking their souls and Counters' abilities. Meanwhile, a firefighter Ma Joo-seok and his wife Min-ji were one of the many families affected by the scam of Baekdu Construction, and Joo-seok seeks revenge on the ones responsible for Min-ji's death.

== Cast ==
=== Main ===
==== Counters ====
- Jo Byeong-kyu as So Mun

An 18-year-old high school student and the newest member of the Counters; part-time server at Eonni's Noodles. Physically disabled following a car accident that killed his parents seven years ago, he joins the Counters after being possessed by the Yung spirit Wi-gen due to his strong sense of justice, responsibility, and desire to protect those dear to him. He was frequently able to summon the Yung and was chosen in a healthy and not comatose state due to his piled-up anger and frustration, that might as well destroy every evil spirit. As a Counter, he possesses superhuman speed, short-range psychometry and the ability to sense evil spirits that enter Yung's "Territory" (Note: In Jang Yi's Amazing Rumor universe, the Territory (땅 [t͈a̠ŋ]) is an energy field that amplifies the Counters' strength and superpowers. Generated by the Yung through the merging of the energies of the human and divine realms, the Territory appears sporadically in random places and lasts for varying lengths of time. To the Counters, it appears like multiple iridescent pillars of energy that shoot from the ground up to the sky. To a human possessed by a powerful evil spirit, it appears like smoke or fog.) (but in a range minor to that of Ha-na's). He later acquires psychokinesis and the ability to touch and summon the Territory at will. Mun has a strong talent for drawing and is currently illustrating a superhero webtoon alongside his best friends Woong-min and Joo-yeon.

- Yoo Jun-sang as Ga Mo-tak

The assistant cook at Eonni's Noodles. A former detective of Jungjin Police Station, after a near-fatal fall that caused his memory loss seven years ago, he joined the Counters after being possessed by Gi-ran, granting him superhuman strength and short-range psychometry. Mo-tak is notable for his gruff appearance but can be a joker occasionally. He was somewhat like a mentor to Mun after he got to know about his past and relationship with Mun. In Season 2, he returned to being a detective at Jungjin Police Station, thereby being able to provide easier cover for capturing evil spirits.

- Kim Se-jeong as Do Ha-na

The server at Eonni's Noodles. The sole survivor after she and her family were poisoned, Ha-na joined the Counters after being possessed by Woo-Sik who granted her superhuman strength and psychometry. She is capable of sensing evil spirits even from hundreds of kilometers away, as well as being able to read and enter memories from years ago as if she was physically there.

- Yeom Hye-ran as Chu Mae-ok

The chef at Eonni's Noodles. In the past, she ran a photography studio for a living. Now a grieving mother dealing with the death of her son Su-ho. She joins the Counters after being possessed by Su-ho's spirit. She gains powerful healing abilities. Exuding an extremely caring and positive personality that highly contrasts with Mo-tak and Ha-na, she serves as the team's advisor and a mother figure to Mun.

- Ahn Suk-hwan as Choi Jang-mul

The first and the leader of the Counters in Korea; owner of Jangmul Retail. Jang-mul is one of the richest chaebol in South Korea. He manages the Counters' expenses and supports them in matters that need his influence. He retired from being a Counter, though his powers and responsibilities as a Counter remain.

- Yoo In-soo as Na Jeok-bong (Season 2)

A clumsy new Counter who is unfamiliar with everything. He became a new counter on the recommendation of Mo-tak, who was moved by the spirit of sacrifice. He possesses the ability to sniff the scents of evil spirits.

==== Evil Spirits ====
- Lee Hong-nae as Ji Chung-sin (Season 1 (All Episodes) & Season 2 (Ep. 1, 9))

A human possessed by a Level 3 evil spirit (akgwi). Chung-sin works in a junkyard and is frequently hired as a hitman by Mayor Shin through his adoptive father. His biological father ran the care home he was adopted from, yet both of his father figures were extremely abusive towards Chung-sin during childhood and provided very little affection to him growing up, instead honing him into a criminal servant for their own dirty deeds. He killed the late counter Cheol-joong in a fierce battle. He possesses an advanced level of psychokinesis which can effortlessly incapacitate individuals.

- Ok Ja-yeon as Baek Hyang-hui (Season 1)

A human possessed by a Level 3 evil spirit. Hyang-hui is inclined to marrying rich men in order to murder them and steal their money. She has the power of psychometry and is able to communicate with the possessing evil spirit, as well as demonstrating superhuman strength. Naturally flirtatious, her charm often catches her victims off-guard leading to an easier murder.

- Kang Ki-young as Hwang Pil-kwang (Season 2)

A third-level evil spirit possessing powerful psychokinesis that can absorb the Counters' abilities.

- Kim Hieora as Gelli Choi (Season 2)

A third-level evil spirit specializing in speed who scratches, stabs, cuts, and kills. She can also read and erase memories.

- Kim Hyun-wook as Wong Li Qiang (Season 2)

A bright psychopath with a creepy smile. After he kills a Chinese Counter and gains healing powers, Wong returns to Korea and begins killing people more brutally and harshly.

- Jin Seon-kyu as Ma Joo-seok (Season 2)

A benefactor of So Mun and a hot-blooded firefighter who does not know how to ignore injustice.

=== Supporting ===
==== Yung ====
- Moon Sook as Wi-gen

Mun's first Yung partner. Wi-gen is the leader of the Yung, the boundary between the afterlife and the world of the living. She is amazed by the fact that she was able to possess Mun despite the latter not being comatose.

- Kim So-ra as Kim Gi-ran

Mo-tak's Yung partner. Gi-ran is an upright spirit who is greatly angered by Mo-tak and his fellow Counters' occasional rule-breaking.

- Eun Ye-jun (Season 1) and Kwon Duk-in (Season 2) as Woo-sik

Ha-na's Yung partner. Woo-sik appears to be a young boy but he is mature in his mindset and personality.

- Lee Chan-hyeong as Kwon Su-ho

Mae-ok's Yung partner and her biological son. Su-ho is in charge of keeping Yung's record of deaths.

- Choi Kwang-je as Jong-guk (Season 2)

Jeok-bong's Yung partner. Jong-guk is a seemingly cowardly spirit who does not want Jeok-bong to do anything rash.

- Woo Mi-hwa as The Prosecutor

==== Mun's high school ====
- Kim Eun-soo as Kim Woong-min

Mun's schoolmate and childhood best friend. Without Mun's knowing, Woong-min is constantly being bullied by Hyuk-woo and his henchmen. His suffering is later discovered by Mun, who then uses his newfound Counter powers to humiliate Hyuk-woo.

- Lee Ji-won as Im Ju-yeon

Mun's schoolmate and childhood best friend. Joo-yeon kept the truth from Mun that Woong-min is being bullied by Hyuk-woo.

- Jung Won-chang as Shin Hyuk-woo

Son of Jungjin Mayor Shin Myung-hwi; Mun's schoolmate. As the mayor's son, Hyuk-woo receives preferential treatment from the school faculty who let him get away with his bullying. His behavior however, stems from fearing his father and estranged relationship with him.

- Kim Min-ho as Baek Jun-kyu

Mun's older and bigger schoolmate and the leader of a gang of bullies who collects money from younger bullies except Hyuk-woo with whom he is nicer with. Jun-kyu also has a strong grudge against Mun after being publicly humiliated in a fight with him.

==== People of Jungjin ====
===== Season 1 =====
- Yoon Joo-sang as Ha Seok-gu

Mun's maternal grandfather.

- Lee Joo-sil as Jang Chun-ok

Mun's maternal grandmother. Chun-ok suffers from dementia and does not recognize Mun most of the time.

- Choi Yoon-young as Kim Jeong-yeong

A police detective of Jungjin Police Station; Mo-tak's former fiancé. Jeong-yeong is an upright detective who is always overpowered by her corrupt fellow police officers. She was in charge of the case of the death of Mun's parents.

- Lee Kyung-min as Kang Han-wool

A police detective of Jungjin Police Station; Jeong-yeong's junior and partner. In Season 2, he becomes Mo-tak's partner.

- Son Kang-gook as Choi Soo-ryong

The police chief of Jungjin Police Station, easily influenced by Shin Myung-hwi for his own selfish interest.

- Choi Kwang-il as Shin Myung-hwi

Mayor of Jungjin City; father of Hyuk-woo. Mayor Shin is in charge of a major redevelopment project in Jungjin which worries many residents.

- Jeon Jin-oh as Noh Chang-kyu

A gangster who led the mob that cornered Mo-tak seven years ago; Hang-kyu's younger brother.

- Kim Seung-hoon as Noh Hang-kyu

Director of Taeshin Group; Chang-kyu's older brother. A criminal who used Cho Tae-shin and Shin Myung-hwi's influence to fly through the ranks of Taeshin Group.

- Lee Do-yeop as Cho Tae-shin

CEO of Taeshin Group, the company in charge of Jungjin's major redevelopment project that acts as a façade for a sinister motive.

- Kim Jung-jin as Jang Hye-kyung

Secretary of Mayor Shin. Extremely obedient and hard-working, although not by choice.

- Kim Yi-kyung as Kim Yeong-nim

A young woman who went missing after volunteering in Shin Myung-hwi's electoral camp seven years ago. She was close friends with Hye-kyung.

===== Season 2 =====
- Hong Ji-hee as Lee Min-ji

Joo-seok's wife.

- Seong Byeong-suk as Shin Jung-ae

Joo-seok's mother.

- Seo Byeok-joon as Park Do-hwi

Ha-na's first love, and a piano teacher.

- Park Jung-bok as Park Sung-wook

Nicknamed Park Pro, he is the accountant of Baekdu Construction.

- Jeong Taek-hyeon as Lim Jae-youl

A member of Red Rose Gang.

- Kim Hyun-joon as Lee Choong-jae

The CEO of Baekdu Construction.

=== Special appearances ===
==== Season 1 ====
- Jeon Seok-ho as So Gwon

Mun's father and a police officer who was an acquaintance of Mo-tak, who investigated Mayor Shin's corruption together. (Eps. 1-2, 11, 15-16).

- Son Yeo-eun as Ha Mun-young

Mun's mother and a police officer. Despite the two of them being constantly busy with their line of work and having no time to bond with Mun, they deeply care and love him. (Eps. 1-2, 16).

- Sung Ji-ru as Jang Cheol-joong

A late member of the Counters. Cheol-joong was the strongest Counter among the former quartet. He was killed by Chung-sin in a fierce one-on-one battle (Ep. 1, 16).

- Lee Sun-bin as Heo Hee-young

A coffee shop owner whose parents were killed by a Level 2 evil spirit (Eps. 1, 3)

- Park Ah-sung as Ha-jeong

A school bully with an earring, bullies Hyo-cheol on the way to school but gets blocked by So Moon, who teaches him a lesson. (Ep. 3)

- Lee Jin-kwon as a Dajeong ENC employee. (Ep. 12)
- Choi Go as an orphan

An orphan at the same care home Chung-sin grew up in, quickly seeing him as a father figure due to the lack thereof prior. (Ep. 13-14)

- Son Ho-jun as Oh Jung-gu

A South Korean Counter who was delegated to work in Singapore. A former rock musician, he became a Counter when his Yung partner Dong-pal possessed him when he was comatose; he had healing powers, similar to Mae-ok. He was dispatched back to South Korea in order to heal a severely wounded Mae-ok, and later joined them on a mission against a Level 4 spirit. (Ep. 15)

- Im Ji-kyu as Dong-pal

Mun's second Yung partner; the former Yung partner of Jang-mul and Jung-gu. Dong-pal became Jung-gu's partner after Jang-mul's retirement. (Ep. 15)

==== Season 2 ====
- Heo Dong-won as Heo Je-hoon

A school bus driver demon. (Ep. 1)

- Eom Ji-yoon as Su-min

Jeok-bong's blind date. (Ep. 2)

- Angelina Danilova as Jade

Wi-gen's daughter. (Ep. 12)

== Episodes ==
No.	Title	Directed by	Written by	Original release date	South Korea viewers (millions)
1	"Episode 1"	Yoo Seon-dong	Yeo Ji-na	November 28, 2020	0.737
As a man possessed with a Level 3 evil spirit kills the Counter Cheol-joong in a fierce melee, Cheol-joong's afterlife partner Wi-gen leaves his body and searches for a new comatose human host. Mun is treating his friends to food on his birthday when he is suddenly struck with a burst of light which gives him strange powers. He meets three other people powered like him in a noodle shop.
2	"Episode 2"	Yoo Seon-dong	Yeo Ji-na	November 29, 2020	1.208
Rescued by the Counters from a beating by some bullies, Mun wakes up to a stunning surprise from Mae-ok. After having a glimpse of his newfound powers, Mun joins the Counters in his first ever demon-hunting. Mun meets Wi-gen and accepts the role as Counter on one condition.
3	"Episode 3"	Yoo Seon-dong	Yeo Ji-na	December 5, 2020	1.446
Mun joins the Counters on his first official demon-hunt and experiences how to banish an evil spirit from its host. Woong-min and Joo-yeon starts to notice something is different about Mun who later confronts the bullies, humiliating them. The amnesiac Mo-tak goes to the police station in an attempt to find answers about his forgotten past and the truth behind the death of Mun's parents.
4	"Episode 4"	Yoo Seon-dong	Yeo Ji-na	December 6, 2020	1.857
Taking revenge against Mun, the bullies gang up on Woong-min and Joo-yeon. Just as Wi-gen feared, Mun loses control and quickly overwhelms all of the bullies in a formidable frenzy of rage. As the Yung spirits consider punishing Mun, Mae-ok and the other Counters come to his defense. A surprise awaits Mo-tak as he reunites with his old cellphone.
5	"Episode 5"	Yoo Seon-dong & Park Bong-seop	Yeo Ji-na	December 12, 2020	1.786
In a demon-hunt at a shopping mall, Mun attempts to fight a woman possessed with a Level 3 demon. When Ha-na comes to his rescue, the demon reads into her tragic past just before Mo-tak arrives to knock the possessed woman out cold. Mo-tak partners up with police officer Jeong-yeong in finding evidences relevant to the case he was working on when he lost his memories.
6	"Episode 6"	Yoo Seon-dong & Park Bong-seop	Yeo Ji-na	December 13, 2020	2.352
Mo-tak's former tormentors—a group of gangsters—recognize him in an encounter and fearfully relate his apparent return to their boss. Mo-tak continues to uncover the past with Jeong-yeong, who is also investigating a recent brutal murder. Mun feels betrayed when he discovers the Counters already knew the truth behind his parents' death. Ha-na helps Mun look into his traumatic past.
7	"Episode 7"	Yoo Seon-dong & Park Bong-seop	Yeo Ji-na	December 19, 2020	2.343
While travelling with Ha-na into his tragic past, Mun comes face-to-face with the powerful Level 3 demon that murdered his parents. Recalling the dangerous encounter, Mun uncovers where the demon's host might be hiding. Mo-tak's tormentors swarm at Eonni's Noodles in an attempt to get rid of him.
8	"Episode 8"	Yoo Seon-dong & Park Bong-seop	Yeo Ji-na	December 20, 2020	2.666
The Counters survive an attempt by the gangsters to eliminate them. Ha-na's role as a Counter is put to the test as she fights against an evil spirit possessing his abusive uncle. Jungjin's police launch a hunt for the culprit behind the successive brutal murders in the city. As the Counters search for a reservoir linked to a case Mun's late father had worked on, they make an appalling discovery.
9	"Episode 9"	Yoo Seon-dong & Park Bong-seop	Yeo Ji-na	January 2, 2021	2.701
After nearly perishing in a one-on-one battle against Chung-sin, Mun practices how to summon Yung's Territory at will. The Counters gatecrash Mayor Shin's groundbreaking event in an attempt to expose his and his accomplices' crimes. Unbeknownst to the quartet, their partner spirits in Yung face interrogation for the Counter's frequent rule-breaking.
10	"Episode 10"	Yoo Seon-dong & Park Bong-seop	Yeo Ji-na	January 3, 2021	2.793
Upon Wi-gen's proposal, the afterlife's council of investigators orders Mun's dismissal from his role as a Counter. Mun consequently loses all his powers, and the devastated Counters let Jang-mul do the task of erasing all of Mun's Counter memories. Mun and the remaining Counters face heightened threats as city officials fake Chung-sin's death and Mayor Shin declares his presidential candidacy.
11	"Episode 11"	Yoo Seon-dong & Park Bong-seop	Yeo Ji-na	January 9, 2021	2.816
Mun and the Counters are in grave danger as a group of demon-possessed humans, recruited and led by Chung-sin, kidnaps Mun to lure the Counters. A soul that managed to escape from an evil spirit suddenly gives Mun the capability to contact the Yung. Ha-na helps Mo-tak restore his lost memories from seven years ago.
12	"Episode 12"	Yoo Seon-dong & Park Bong-seop	Yeo Ji-na	January 10, 2021	3.216
Jeong-yeong is murdered just before she could meet up with Mo-tak. As Mun tries to comfort him, Mo-tak reveals to him that Jeong-yeong's killer is one of her fellow police officers who have been with the force for over 20 years. After gaining Yung's permission, the Counters decide to close the noodle shop and fight against Mayor Shin, his accomplices and Chung-sin.
13	"Episode 13"	Yoo Seon-dong & Park Bong-seop	Yoo Seon-dong	January 16, 2021	2,974
Chung-sin's parasitic evil spirit upgrades to Level 4, the highest rank possible for evil spirits. The four Yung spirits demonstrate to the Counters a method they could use in defeating Chung-sin, but it has a catch: unless they are always inside the Territory, the Counters will lose their powers while using it. While Mun struggles with practicing his Territory summoning ability, Mo-tak and Han-wool apprehend the culprit behind Jeong-yeong's death.
14	"Episode 14"	Yoo Seon-dong & Park Bong-seop	Kim Sae-bom	January 17, 2021	2.981
The Level 4 evil spirit compels Chung-sin to kill himself and escapes from his dead body. Despite being deprived of the chance to meet his parents' souls, Mun claims he still can feel his parents' presence in the human realm and refuses to give up. Using the Territory, Mun scours Jungjin for the powerful evil spirit which has found a new host in Mayor Shin.
15	"Episode 15"	Yoo Seon-dong & Park Bong-seop	Kim Sae-bom	January 23, 2021	2.925
Mayor Shin escapes after Mun acquires a new ability. Ha-na successfully casts the Level 3 evil spirit out of Hyang-hee's body. Mun takes the traumatized Hyuk-woo to Eonni's Noodles. A Counter who returned from overseas to help the Korean team perishes after battling Mayor Shin, but things turn uncanny when his Yung partner unexpectedly possesses the body of an active Counter.
16	"Episode 16"	Yoo Seon-dong & Park Bong-seop	Kim Sae-bom	January 24, 2021	3.257
Mun and his fellow Counters engage in their final battle against Mayor Shin who has held Mun's grandparents hostage.

== Production ==
=== Development ===
Scriptwriter Yeo Ji-na left the series after 12 episodes due to "different opinions on the series' final storyline;" the 13th episode was written by director Yoo Seon-dong and the final three episodes of the season were written by Kim Sae-bom. On January 25, 2021, the series was officially renewed for a second season.

Through OCN and tvN, a special broadcast titled The Uncanny Return (경이로운 귀환) aired on February 7, 2021, at 22:40 (KST). The special broadcast stars Jo Byeong-kyu, Yoo Jun-sang, Kim Se-jeong, Yeom Hye-ran, Ahn Suk-hwan, Choi Kwang-il, Ok Ja-yeon, Lee Hong-nae and Jung Won-chang.

=== Casting ===
In July 2020, Jo Byeong-kyu, Yoo Jun-sang, Kim Se-jeong and Yeom Hye-ran were confirmed to star in the series. The first script reading took place in October 2020.

=== Soundtrack ===
The following are the official track lists of The Uncanny Counter: Original Soundtrack and The Uncanny Counter 2: Original Soundtrack albums, which were released on January 24, 2021, and September 3, 2023, respectively, by labels Genie Music and Stone Music Entertainment . The tracks with no indicated lyricists and composers are the drama's musical score; the artists indicated for these tracks are the tracks' composers themselves.

The Uncanny Counter: Original Soundtrack

No.	Title	Lyrics	Music	Artist	Length
1.	"Close Your Eyes"	Hen; Lee Geon	Hen	Hong Isaac	3:04
2.	"Meet Again" (재회 (再會))	Sejeong	Sejeong; MIN; BYMORE	Sejeong	4:34
3.	"No Problem" (괜찮아)	Jayins	Jayins	Dvwn	3:31
4.	"The Uncanny Counter" (경이로운 소문 Main Theme; lit. "Amazing So Mun Main Theme")			Kim Woo-geun	2:41
5.	"Ga Mo-tak Theme" (가모탁 Theme)			Kim Woo-geun	2:01
6.	"Step on the Ground" (땅을 밟은 지청신; lit. "Ji Chung-sin steps on the Territory")			Kim Woo-geun; Seo Ga-ui	2:14
7.	"The Counters vs. Ji Chung-sin" (카운터 vs 지청신)			Kim Woo-geun; Seo Ga-ui	2:42
8.	"Team 'Unnine'" (언니네파)			Kim Woo-geun	2:18
9.	"It's all about being alive" (추여사 Theme; lit. "Ms. Chu Theme")			Bamgeuneul	3:25
10.	"Jungjin City" (중진시)			Kim Woo-geun	1:51
11.	"Do Ha-na Theme" (도하나 Theme)			Kim Woo-geun	1:10
12.	"The Counters" (카운터 Theme; lit. "Counters Theme")			Kim Woo-geun	2:03
13.	"An odd encounter" (대문도 아니고 소문; lit. "It's not a gate, So Mun")			Bamgeuneul	3:00
14.	"Yung" (융)			Seo Ga-ui	7:18
15.	"Kidnapped Woong-min" (납치된 웅민)			Kim Woo-geun	1:42
16.	"There are worse ones" (더한 놈들이 있어)			Bamgeuneul	2:14
17.	"I told you I'd heal you" (고쳐 준다고 했잖아)			Kim Woo-geun	2:44
18.	"Do Ha-na vs. Baek Hyang-hee" (도하나 vs 백향희)			Seo Ga-ui	4:01
19.	"So Mun's Awakening" (소문의 각성)			Seo Ga-ui	2:26
20.	"I can walk again" (걸음; lit. "Steps")			Bamgeuneul	2:00
21.	"A funny sketch" (몽타쥬; lit. "Composite sketch")			Bamgeuneul	1:31
22.	"That's what it's called" (상처란 게 그런거야; lit. "That's how scars are like")			Bamgeuneul	2:16
23.	"A deep relationship" (깊은 인연)			Bamgeuneul	1:38
24.	"The Counters vs. Demons" (카운터 vs 악귀)			Seo Ga-ui	1:28
25.	"The Death of Jeong-yeong" (정영의 죽음)			Bamgeuneul	2:20
26.	"Final Boss"			Kim Woo-geun	0:55
27.	"Last Farewell" (마지막 인사)			Bamgeuneul	3:11
28.	"Time Warp"			Seo Ga-ui	3:17
29.	"The Day" (그 날)			Bamgeuneul	1:46
30.	"Telekinesis" (염력)			Kim Woo-geun	2:19
31.	"So Mun vs. Ji Chung-sin" (소문 vs 지청신)			Seo Ga-ui; Kim Woo-geun	5:18
32.	"Barrier" (결계)			Seo Ga-ui	4:06
33.	"The Uncanny Counter Remix" (경이로운 소문 Remix; lit. "Amazing So Mun Remix")			Kim Woo-geun	2:12
Total length:					89:15

Singles from The Uncanny Counter (Parts 1–3)

Part 1

Released on December 6, 2020
No.	Title	Lyrics	Music	Artist	Length
1.	"Close Your Eyes"	Hen; Lee Geon	Hen	Hong Isaac	3:04
2.	"Close Your Eyes" (Inst.)		Hen		3:04
Total length:					6:08

Part 2

Released on December 20, 2020
No.	Title	Lyrics	Music	Artist	Length
1.	"Meet Again" (재회 (再會))	Sejeong	Sejeong; MIN; BYMORE	Sejeong	4:34
2.	"Meet Again" (Inst.)		Sejeong; MIN; BYMORE		4:34
Total length:					9:08

Part 3

Released on January 17, 2021
No.	Title	Lyrics	Music	Artist	Length
1.	"No Problem" (괜찮아)	Jayins	Jayins	Dvwn	3:31
2.	"No Problem" (Inst.)		Jayins		3:31
Total length:					7:02

The Uncanny Counter 2: Original Soundtrack

No.	Title	Lyrics	Music	Artist	Length
1.	"Ready Set Go"	Dong Woo-seok	Kim Woo-geun; Dong Woo-seok; Yoo Jeong-hyun	Cravity	3:07
2.	"Once Again" (다시 그렇게)	SNNNY	SNNNY	Sejeong	3:50
3.	"Watch"	Kevin_D(D_answer); IAN; Aqu; leo.	Kevin_D(D_answer); 권디엘(iamdl); IAN; Aqu; leo.; Back b	8Turn	3:48
4.	"Counter Punch" (카운터 펀치)			Kim Woo-geun; Jeong Jin-mok	3:15
5.	"Bus Chaser" (버스 추격전)			Seo Ga-ui; Kim Woo-geun	9:32
6.	"I can do it !"			Hwang Yoo-kyung	3:40
7.	"Counters" (카운터즈)			Kim Woo-geun	1:31
8.	"Heading to Yung" ('융'으로)			Lee Seong-yi	4:40
9.	"My Treasure" (뽀물이)			Hwang Yoo-kyung	2:03
10.	"I'll School You" (참교육 강좌)			Kim Woo-geun	2:28
11.	"Demons" (악귀즈)			Kim Woo-geun	0:38
12.	"Phil-Guang Theme" (필광 테마)			Seo Ga-ui	1:46
13.	"MinJi's Death" (민지의 죽음)			Seo Ga-ui	2:52
14.	"I won't forgive you" (용서하지 않아)			Lee Seong-ju	2:50
15.	"Regret" (후회)			Lee Seong-ju	2:40
16.	"Blackening" (주석의 흑화)			Seo Ga-ui; Kim Woo-geun	3:34
17.	"The right person" (적임자)			Lee Seong-ju	3:19
18.	"Psychometry" (싸이코메트리)			Kim Woo-geun; Seo Ga-ui	3:49
19.	"Comeback Home"			Seo Ga-ui	1:51
20.	"Are you dating?" (너네 사귀어?)			Lee Seong-ju	2:21
21.	"Memory Loss"			Seo Ga-ui	1:41
22.	"Juck-Bong Theme" (적봉 테마)			Lee Seong-ju	3:29
23.	"Loan Shark" (신체포기 각서)			Seo Ga-ui	2:41
24.	"Shake Shake" (흔들 흔들)			Lee Seong-ju	2:20
25.	"Counter Training" (카운터 트레이닝)			Jeong Jin-mok; Kim Woo-geun	1:06
26.	"Hana & DoHwi" (하나와 도휘)			Lee Seong-ju	2:35
27.	"Stare down"			Seo Ga-ui	2:39
28.	"Determination"			Seo Ga-ui	2:04
29.	"Gas Station"			Kim Woo-geun	1:23
30.	"Thank you for being alive" (살아줘서 고마워)			Lee Seong-ju	2:16
31.	"A hidden clue" (숨은 단서)			Lee Seong-ju	3:49
32.	"Heifer" (소순이)			Jeong Jin-mok	2:32
33.	"A good person" (좋은 사람)			Hwang Yoo-kyung	2:08
34.	"Doctrin"			Lee Seong-ju	3:11
35.	"Running"			Seo Ga-ui	2:26
36.	"Curly hair" (곱슬머리)			Jeong Jin-mok	2:48
37.	"Finally"			Seo Ga-ui	1:52
38.	"Just think of me" (날 생각하면 돼)			Lee Seong-ju	5:15
Total length:					109:49

Singles from The Uncanny Counter 2 (Parts 1–3)

Part 1

Released on August 6, 2023
No.	Title	Lyrics	Music	Artist	Length
1.	"Ready Set Go"	Dong Woo-seok	Kim Woo-geun; Dong Woo-seok; Yoo Jeong-hyun	Cravity	3:07
2.	"Ready Set Go" (Inst.)		Kim Woo-geun; Dong Woo-seok; Yoo Jeong-hyun		3:07
Total length:					6:14

Part 2

Released on August 13, 2023
No.	Title	Lyrics	Music	Artist	Length
1.	"Once Again" (다시 그렇게)	SNNNY	SNNNY	Sejeong	3:50
2.	"Once Again" (Inst.)		SNNNY		3:50
Total length:					7:40

Part 3

Released on August 27, 2023
No.	Title	Lyrics	Music	Artist	Length
1.	"Watch"	Kevin_D(D_answer); IAN; Aqu; leo.	Kevin_D(D_answer); 권디엘(iamdl); IAN; Aqu; leo.; Back b	8Turn	3:48
2.	"Watch" (Inst.)		Kevin_D(D_answer); 권디엘(iamdl); IAN; Aqu; leo.; Back b		3:48
Total length:					7:36

== Release ==
The first teaser was released on October 19, 2020, giving sneak peeks of the characters.

== Viewership ==
The first episode of the series logged an average viewership ratings of 2.7% nationwide and 3.2% in metropolitan area, peaking at a high of 4.1%. The second episode logged a ratings of 4.35%, witnessing an unusual increase in average nationwide viewership compared to the ratings of the first episode. The audience rating for the third episode was 5.2% nationwide. It rose 0.8% from the ratings of the last two episodes. The 16th episode recorded a rating of 11% for nationwide audience, which was the highest for the series.

The Uncanny Counter : South Korea viewers per episode (millions)

Season	Episode number																Average
Season	1	2	3	4	5	6	7	8	9	10	11	12	13	14	15	16	Average
1	0.737	1.208	1.446	1.857	1.786	2.352	2.343	2.666	2.701	2.793	2.816	3.216	2.974	2.981	2.925	3.257	2.379
2	1.379	1.610	1.411	1.585	1.328	1.415	1.165	1.482	1.240	1.572	1.178	1.831	–				1.433

Source: Audience measurement performed nationwide by Nielsen Korea.

=== Season 1 ===
Average TV viewership ratings (season 1)
Ep.	Original broadcast date	Average audience share (Nielsen Korea)	
Ep.	Original broadcast date	Nationwide	Seoul
1	November 28, 2020	2.702% (5th)	3.167% (5th)
2	November 29, 2020	4.350% (3rd)	4.145% (3rd)
3	December 5, 2020	5.329% (1st)	5.789% (1st)
4	December 6, 2020	6.724% (1st)	6.370% (1st)
5	December 12, 2020	6.060% (2nd)	6.695% (2nd)
6	December 13, 2020	7.654% (2nd)	7.364% (2nd)
7	December 19, 2020	7.721% (2nd)	7.602% (2nd)
8	December 20, 2020	9.302% (2nd)	8.963% (2nd)
9	January 2, 2021	8.386% (2nd)	8.289% (2nd)
10	January 3, 2021	9.093% (2nd)	9.188% (2nd)
11	January 9, 2021	8.677% (2nd)	7.764% (2nd)
12	January 10, 2021	10.581% (2nd)	10.203% (2nd)
13	January 16, 2021	9.372% (2nd)	9.476% (2nd)
14	January 17, 2021	9.926% (2nd)	9.870% (2nd)
15	January 23, 2021	8.995% (2nd)	8.550% (2nd)
16	January 24, 2021	10.999% (2nd)	10.785% (2nd)
Average		7.867%	7.764%
In the table above, the blue numbers represent the lowest ratings and the red numbers represent the highest ratings.; This series airs on a cable channel/pay TV which normally has a relatively smaller audience compared to free-to-air TV/public broadcasters (KBS, SBS, MBC and EBS).

=== Season 2 ===
Average TV viewership ratings (season 2)
Ep.	Original broadcast date	Average audience share (Nielsen Korea)	
Ep.	Original broadcast date	Nationwide	Seoul
1	July 29, 2023	3.949% (1st)	3.948% (1st)
2	July 30, 2023	5.446% (1st)	5.529% (1st)
3	August 5, 2023	4.757% (1st)	5.259% (1st)
4	August 6, 2023	4.790% (1st)	4.961% (1st)
5	August 12, 2023	4.135% (1st)	3.916% (1st)
6	August 13, 2023	4.339% (1st)	4.530% (1st)
7	August 19, 2023	3.841% (1st)	3.883% (1st)
8	August 20, 2023	4.417% (1st)	4.363% (1st)
9	August 26, 2023	3.929% (1st)	3.878% (1st)
10	August 27, 2023	4.901% (1st)	4.772% (1st)
11	September 2, 2023	3.749% (1st)	3.735% (1st)
12	September 3, 2023	6.065% (1st)	6.440% (1st)
Average		4.527%	4.601%
In the table above, the blue numbers represent the lowest ratings and the red numbers represent the highest ratings.; This series aired on a cable channel/pay TV which normally has a relatively smaller audience compared to free-to-air TV/public broadcasters (KBS, SBS, MBC and EBS).

== Awards and nominations ==
Year	Award	Category	Recipient	Result	Ref.
2021	57th Baeksang Arts Awards	Best Supporting Actress (TV)	Yeom Hye-ran	Won	
