= Honest Candidate =

2020 South Korean comedy film

- Theatrical release poster
- Hangul: 정직한 후보
- Hanja: 正直한 候補
- RR: Jeongjikhan hubo
- MR: Chŏngjikhan hubo
- Directed by: Jang Yu-jeong
- Written by: Jang Yu-jeong; Heo Sung-hye
- Based on: O Candidato Honesto by Roberto Santucci
- Produced by: Song Jung-min
- Starring: Ra Mi-ran; Kim Mu-yeol; Na Moon-hee; Yoon Kyung-ho; Jang Dong-joo
- Cinematography: Park Yong-soo
- Edited by: Jung Ji-eun
- Music by: Lee Jae-jin
- Production companies: Hong Film; Soo Film
- Distributed by: Next Entertainment World
- Release date: February 12, 2020
- Running time: 104 minutes
- Country: South Korea
- Language: Korean
- Box office: US$10.6 million

Honest Candidate (Korean: 정직한 후보; RR: Jeongjikhan hubo) is a 2020 South Korean comedy film directed by Jang Yu-jeong, starring Ra Mi-ran, Kim Mu-yeol, Na Moon-hee, Yoon Kyung-ho and Jang Dong-joo. It is the remake of the 2014 Brazilian film O Candidato Honesto. It was released on February 12, 2020.

A sequel, titled Honest Candidate 2, was released on September 28, 2022.

== Plot ==
A third-term congresswoman who is running for the fourth time is suddenly unable to lie a few days before the elections are about to take place. The problem is that her whole political career is based on lies.

== Cast ==
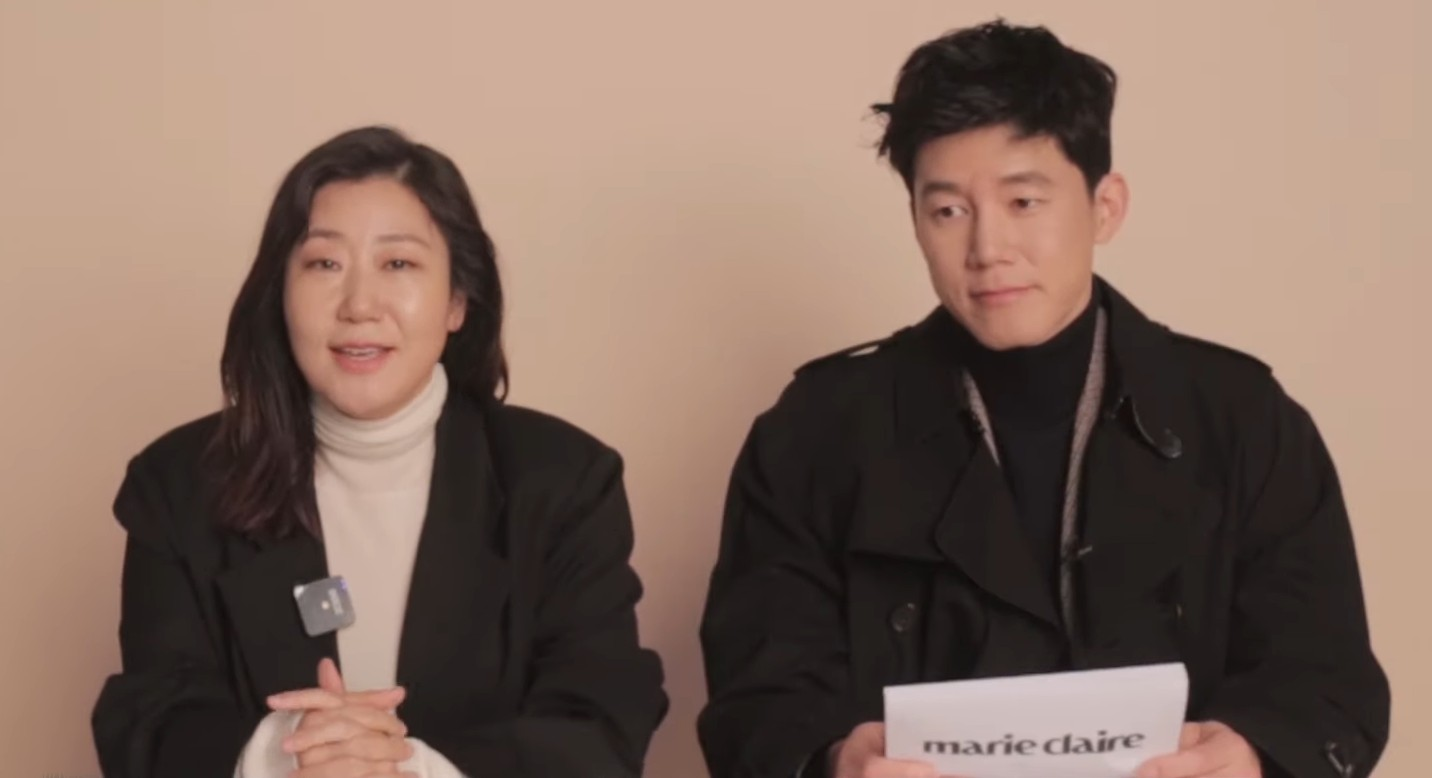
Ra Mi-ran and Kim Mu-yeol for Marie Claire Korea

- Ra Mi-ran as Joo Sang-sook
- Kim Mu-yeol as Park Hee-cheol
- Na Moon-hee as Kim Ok-hee
- Yoon Kyung-ho as Bong Man-sik
- Jang Dong-joo as Bong Eun-ho
- Song Young-chang as Lee Woon-hak
- Son Jong-hak as Kim Sang-pyo
- Cho Soo-hyang as Shin Ji-sun
- Ahn Se-ho as Lee Jeong-min
- Kim Na-yoon as Yoon Mi-kyung
- Ko Kyu-pil as Reporter Hwang
- Kim Yong-rim as mother-in-law

Special appearances

- Jo Han-chul as Nam Yong-sung
- On Joo-wan as Kim Joon-young
- Yoon Se-ah as Cha Yoon-kyung
- Oh Man-seok as Jang Deok-joon

== Production ==
Director Jang Yu-jeong came across the film O Candidato Honesto when she was recording a commentary for The Bros (2017). She said that "she could have made it to fuel anger by shedding light on the realities of local politics and press, but thought it would be more interesting to turn [it] into a satire. [She] was immediately hooked and made the decision [to make the film] in about 10 minutes."

Although the original character is a male politician in Roberto Santucci's O Candidato Honesto, director and screenwriter Jang Yu-jeong cast actress Ra Mi-ran for the role of the protagonist. As she "developed the character, [she] realized that no other person could handle this role other than Ra. That's how the gender changed."

Principal photography began on June 15, 2019. Filming was completed on September 7.

The film is based on the 2014 Brazilian film of the same name, The Honest Candidate (Brazilian Portuguese: O Candidato Honesto). Produced based on a screenplay by Paulo Cursino, it was a hit by criticizing the reality of Brazil at the time while using the subject of 'lie' comically. The Korean remake of Brazil's Honest Candidate was announced in 2016 at the Globalgate Consortium in which the world's leading film production companies and distributors participated and received high attention.

== Release ==
The distributor Next Entertainment World considered postponing the release of the film due to the COVID-19 pandemic but eventually decided not to, and the film was released on February 12, 2020 as originally planned.

== Reception ==
=== Box office ===
Released on a Wednesday, the film topped its first weekend box office and constituted 44% of the total ticket sales.

=== Awards and nominations ===
Year	Award	Category	Recipient	Result	Ref.
2021	41st Blue Dragon Film Awards	Best Actress	Ra Mi-ran	Won	
2021	26th Chunsa Film Art Awards	Best Actress	Ra Mi-ran	Nominated	

== Sequel ==
A sequel to the film titled as Honest Candidate 2 was released on September 28, 2022.

== See also ==
- List of 2020 box office number-one films in South Korea
