= Oh Man-seok =

South Korean actor

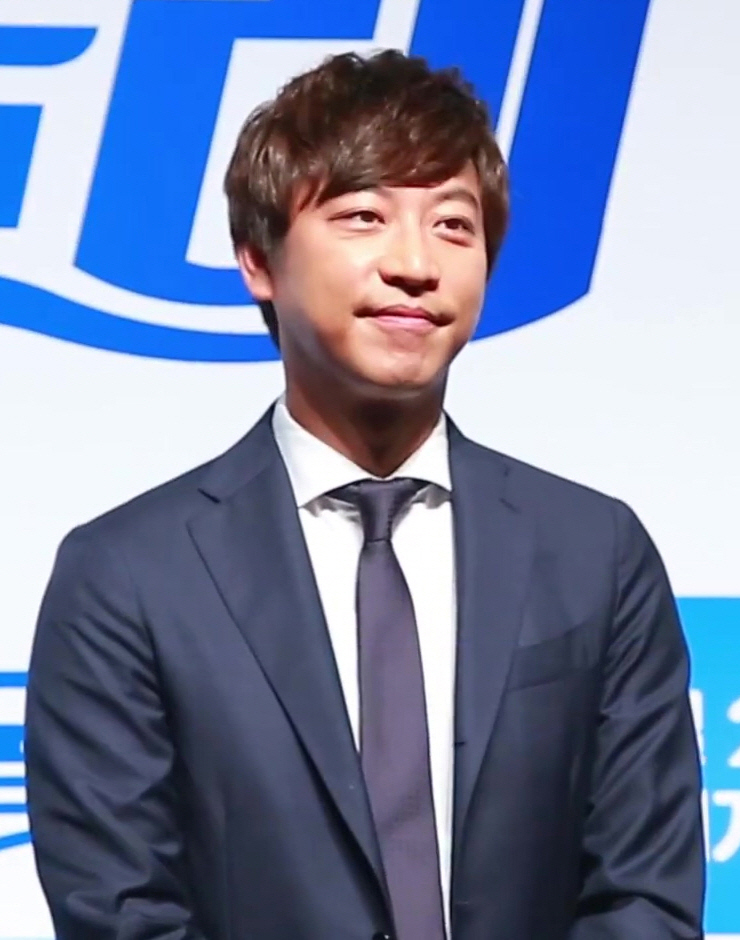
- Oh in 2016
- Born: January 30, 1975 (age 51); Seoul, South Korea
- Education: Korea National University of Arts - BFA in Acting (2002)
- Occupations: Actor; theatre director
- Years active: 1999–present
- Agent: Good Friends Company
- Spouses: Jo Sang-gyeong (m. 2001; div. 2007): Unknown (m. 2018)
- Children: 1

Korean name
- Hangul: 오만석
- Hanja: 吳萬石
- RR: O Manseok
- MR: O Mansŏk
- Website: ohmanseok.com

Oh Man-seok (Korean: 오만석; born January 30, 1975) is a South Korean actor. Best known for playing the titular transgender singer in rock musical Hedwig and the Angry Inch, Oh's acting career spans theater, television, and film.

After graduating from the Korea National University of Arts Theater Institute, he debuted in Daehakro in 1999. He played the role of gay clown Gong-gil in the play Lee, and won the 2000 Theater Association Rookie Actor Award.

== Early life and education ==
Oh Man-seok majored in Theater at Korea National University of Arts. He enlisted and he was discharged from the military in 1997.

== Career ==
=== Theater beginnings ===
Oh Man-seok graduated from the School of Drama at Korea National University of Arts with a BFA in Acting. He made his stage debut in Faust in 1999. One of his early notable roles was as the androgynous court jester Gong-gil who becomes the object of obsession of the tyrant King Yeonsan in Yi, which would later be adapted into the hit 2005 film King and the Clown. Highly acclaimed for his portrayal of Gong-gil, Oh was awarded Best New Actor by the National Theater Association of Korea for the play's first run in 2000, and he reprised the role four more times in 2001, 2003, 2006, and 2010.

More roles followed in The Rocky Horror Show (2001), Return to the Forbidden Planet (2002), Grease (2003), Singin' in the Rain (2004), The Seagull (2004), Woyzeck (2004), and Assassins (2005).

=== Hedwig and the Angry Inch ===
Oh became a bonafide musical theatre superstar in 2005, when he was cast as the titular East German transgender singer in the first Korean staging of the rock musical Hedwig and the Angry Inch. As the first "Korean Hedwig," Oh received sensational reviews for his performance and he won Best Actor at the Korea Musical Awards. After its run, a sold-out concert featured four of the actors alternating in the lead role, namely Oh, Cho Seung-woo, Kim Da-hyun and Song Yong-jin.

In succeeding years, the rock musical's popularity remained enduring in Korea, attracting other actors to the role in later runs, such as Um Ki-joon, Jo Jung-suk, Song Chang-eui, Yoon Do-hyun, Kim Dong-wan and Park Gun-hyung. When John Cameron Mitchell, who wrote, directed and played the original Hedwig in the 1998 musical and the 2001 film, went to Korea in 2007 to hold a concert, Oh was one of his guest performers, along with other Korean Hedwig actors. Oh was also able to talk to Mitchell one-on-one, without an interpreter, for one and a half hours. Both agreed that the role was emotionally and physically consuming, and Oh added that he used to sit absentmindedly with a cigarette for 20 minutes after finishing his performance. A year later in 2008, Mitchell returned to Korea, and he and Oh headlined a concert to commemorate Hedwig's 10th anniversary.

In 2012, seven years after the role made him famous, Oh reprised Hedwig for the rock musical's seventh run in Korea. At a press conference, he jokingly talked about shaving his legs again and being banned from his favorite activities like eating meat, working out, and drinking alcohol, but said that the role was "certainly worth the ordeal." Oh said, "This musical tells us that to love someone is to accept him exactly the way he is. It also tells us that everyone deserves to be loved, and every individual is meaningful and important. I think that's the essential message of this piece."

=== From stage to screen ===
Besides portraying Hedwig, 2005 was also significant in Oh's career because of his appearance in the critically acclaimed period drama Shin Don set in Goryeo. He had played minor roles in film and TV before, but the Buddhist monk Wonhyeon was his first major supporting role. (Oh later made a cameo in the 2010 Korean War drama Road No. 1 as a favor to Shin Don director Kim Jin-min.)

In 2006, Oh achieved mainstream fame with the television series The Vineyard Man (also known as The Man of the Vineyard), in his first onscreen leading role as a country guy in charge of a vineyard, who gradually falls for a hapless city girl determined to work there in order to inherit it. The romantic comedy initially had low ratings, but it later surprisingly held its own against ratings juggernaut Jumong, unlike other Korean dramas in the same timeslot. Oh won Best New Actor and the Popularity Award at the 2006 KBS Drama Awards, and he and costar Yoon Eun-hye were voted as the Best Couple among the network's dramas.

Later that year, Oh took on a very different role in Hyena, a cable drama about the love lives of a group of four male friends. Oh played a successful, urbane man with high standards for "the perfect woman," that he's overly fastidious and critical to his dates.

In 2007, he was cast in his first big-screen leading role as a crime fiction novelist in the thriller Our Town. This was followed by the historical drama The King and I, which centered on the tragic love between King Seongjong, his royal concubine and a self-sacrificing eunuch (played by Oh, for which he won Best Actor in a Serial Drama at the SBS Drama Awards).

From 2009 to 2010, Oh starred in the daily drama Jolly Widows, and he received another Best Actor award from the KBS Drama Awards.

=== Theatre director ===
He continued to be popular in musicals, appearing in the next several years in Jang Yu-jeong's musical Finding Kim Jong-wook (he later made a cameo in its 2010 film adaptation Finding Mr. Destiny, A Day, and Dreamgirls.

Inspired by the 2007 Lee Joon-ik film, Oh made his debut as a theatre director with The Happy Life, which ran from 2008 to 2009. He was also the musical's lyricist and polished the script. The title is ironic, since the story centers on two characters, a high school music teacher (played by Yoo Jun-sang and Im Choon-gil) and a younger man who's recently been orphaned (played by Ryan and Kim Mu-yeol), who live dull, depressing lives, but the only thing that makes them feel alive and gives them joy is music. Calling it a musical that's "both cheerful and emotionally weighty," Oh said directing made him feel a huge sense of responsibility, fear, and nerves, but he did his best with the actors "to create something.""

For his second directorial project, Oh chose The Organ in My Heart. A stage adaptation of the 1999 film The Harmonium in My Memory set in the 1960s about a 17-year-old sixth grader who develops a crush on a 21-year-old male teacher newly assigned to her village school, Oh had previously starred in the musical's original run in 2008. For the musical's run in 2011, Oh cast Tim and Kim Seung-dae in the lead role.

He then directed The Toxic Avenger (called Toxic Hero in Korean) in 2011. Oh had headlined the comedy musical in 2010, playing a nerd who is reborn as a giant green mutant with superpowers, who fights against corruption and environmental pollution. Oh was praised for successfully transforming into a grotesque, comical character, shedding the gentle image he frequently portrayed in previous musicals and television dramas.

Afterwards, he starred in True West (2010) and 200 Pounds Beauty (2011). The latter is a musical adaptation of the same-titled 2006 romantic comedy film, about an overweight ghost singer who undergoes extensive cosmetic surgery to become a pop star; Oh played her love interest, a music producer.

=== Back to television ===
Oh played a professor in What's Up, Song Ji-na's drama about college students in a musical theatre department, which aired on cable in 2011. He also held a series of mini-concerts in 16 cities in Japan that year.

About his supporting turn as a talented but sidelined baseball player in Wild Romance (2012), Oh said, "It's not easy to depict subtle changes in the character's mind. I wanted to portray how unsuccessful people in their 30s and 40s are living in this generation."

Oh described appearing in the short drama format (such as MBC's Best Theater and KBS's Drama City) as a "meaningful experience" for him. He starred in the single-episode That Man's Jealous (2006), Transformation (2007), and Spy Trader Kim Chul-soo's Recent Condition (2010), as well as the four-episode series Special Task Force MSS (2011), and The True Colors of Gang and Cheol (2012).

=== 2013-present ===
He returned to theater in early 2013. Based on the novel of the same name by Daphne du Maurier and the 1940 film by Alfred Hitchcock, the gothic musical Rebecca takes place in Manderley, a stately mansion owned by aristocratic widower Maxim DeWinter (played by Oh), whose memory of Rebecca, his beautiful dead wife who drowned in a boating accident, keeps haunting him and his new bride.

Jukebox musical Those Days (also known as The Days) featured folk-rock singer Kim Kwang-seok's music, in a story about the president's daughter who goes missing along with her bodyguard, on the day of the 20th anniversary of Korea-China diplomatic relations. Oh played the head of the presidential security service who slowly unravels the mystery of where they've gone.

On television, Oh played the slacker husband of the second eldest daughter in weekend drama Wang's Family.

He then starred as drag queen Lola in the 2014 Korean staging of Kinky Boots, the first international adaptation of the musical since its Broadway premiere in 2013.

In 2018, he starred in the last few episodes of the MBC drama Partners for Justice as Do Ji-han, an experienced Prosecutor. He later reprised his role in the sequel Partners for Justice 2, this time as a major character.

In 2019, he played the character of Cho Cheol-gang in the tvN series Crash Landing on You.

== Other activities ==
Oh is also the vocalist of a band called Little Wing. He owns the OD Musical Entertainment Company, which produced several of the musicals he's starred in.

== Personal life ==
Oh met Jo Sang-gyeong when both were students at the Korea National University of Arts. After dating for a year and half, they married in 2001. Jo went on to a successful career as a costume designer, for films such as Oldboy, Tazza: The High Rollers, The Host and Modern Boy. The couple divorced in May 2007 but remain friends. They have a daughter named Oh Young-joo.

Oh dated Jolly Widows costar Jo An for nearly two years, before breaking up in late 2011.

In 2017, it was reported that Oh Man Suk was in a relationship with a non-celebrity. The couple tied the knot in early 2018 and the news was revealed later by his agency in June 2018.

== Filmography ==
=== Television series ===
| Year | Title | Role |
|---|---|---|
| 2003 | Age of Warriors | Yangpyo |
| 2005 | Shin Don | Wonhyeon |
| 2006 | MBC Best Theater: "That Man's Jealous" | Korean language teacher |
| 2006 | The Vineyard Man | Jang Taek-gi |
| 2006 | Hyena | Choi Jin-beom |
| 2007 | Surgeon Bong Dal-hee | Oh Jung-min (guest, episodes 13-14) |
| 2007 | Drama City: "Transformation" | Monk |
| 2007 | The King and I | Kim Cheo-seon |
| 2008 | Strongest Chil Woo | Kang Chil-woo's father (cameo, episode 1) |
| 2009 | Jolly Widows | Han Jin-woo |
| 2010 | Road No. 1 | North Korean soldier (guest, episodes 16-17) |
| 2010 | KBS Drama Special: "Spy Trader Kim Chul-soo's Recent Condition" | Kim Chul-soo |
| 2011 | KBS Drama Special: "Special Task Force MSS" | Noh Chul-gi |
| 2011 | Warrior Baek Dong-soo | Crown Prince Sado |
| 2011 | What's Up | Sunwoo Young |
| 2012 | Wild Romance | Jin Dong-soo |
| 2012 | KBS Drama Special: "The True Colors of Gang and Cheol" | Noh Chul-gi |
| 2013 | Wang's Family | Heo Se-dal |
| 2014 | Prime Minister & I | gangster (cameo, episode 12) |
| 2014 | Pluto Secret Society | Choi Ki-chan's colleague (cameo, episode 4) |
| 2016 | Another Miss Oh | film director Oh Man-seok (cameo, episode 18) |
| 2016 | Squad 38 | Park Deok-bae (cameo) |
| 2018 | Partners for Justice | Do Ji-Han |
| 2019 | Beautiful World | Oh Jin-pyo |
| 2019 | Partners for Justice 2 | Do Ji-Han |
| 2019 | Birthday Letter | Ham-duk and Young-geum's father |
| 2019-2020 | Crash Landing on You | Cho Cheol-gang |
| 2020 | JTBC Drama Festa: "Hello Dracula" | Jong-su |
| 2021 | Youth of May | Hwang Ki-nam |
| 2023 | The Secret Romantic Guesthouse | Jang Tae-hwa |
| 2023 | Miraculous Brothers | Kai |

=== Film ===
| Year | Title | Role | Notes |
|---|---|---|---|
| 2000 | To My Love | | short film |
| 2004 | Liar | Alex | |
| 2006 | A Cruel Attendance | Sponge (cameo) | |
| 2006 | Fly Up | narration | documentary |
| 2007 | Soo | Jeom Park-yi | |
| 2007 | Our Town | Kyung-ju | |
| 2010 | Finding Mr. Destiny | Kim Jong-mook (cameo) | |
| 2011 | Countdown | Swy | |
| 2016 | Chasing | 340 bus driver | |
| 2016 | Detour | Eun-dong | |
| 2017 | The Bros | Representative Oh | Cameo |
| 2018 | True Fiction | Lee Kyong-Seok | |
| 2020 | Honest Candidate | Jang Deok-joon | Cameo |

=== Variety show appearances ===
| Date | Episode # | Title | Role | Network |
|---|---|---|---|---|
| 2008-06-02 ~ 06-04 | | EBS Prime Documentary "한중일 궁중생활사" | narration | EBS |
| 2009 | | 10th Jeonju International Film Festival; Closing Ceremony | host | |
| 2009-05-17 | | SBS Prime Documentary "The Truth About Jajangmyeon" | narration | SBS |
| 2009 | | 3rd The Musical Awards | host | |
| 2010 | | 4th The Musical Awards | host | |
| 2011 | | 5th The Musical Awards | host | |
| 2012 | | 6th The Musical Awards | host | |
| 2012-03-18 ~ 06-10 | | Sunday Night - Exploration of Genders | regular cast | MBC |
| 2013-03-30 | 6 | SNL Korea - Season 4 | host | tvN |
| 2014-06-24 ~ 2017-11-01 | | Taxi | host | tvN |
| 2021-01-22 | 6 | Busted! - Season 3 | guest | Netflix |

== Stage ==
=== Concerts ===
Concert performances
| Year | Title | | Role | Theater | Date | Ref. |
| Year | English | Korean | Role | Theater | Date | Ref. |
|---|---|---|---|---|---|---|
| 2005 | Hedwig and the Angry Inch: The Concert | 헤드윅 앤 앵그리인치 더 콘서트 | Hedwig | Olympic Park Olympic Hall | July 2 | |
| 2005 | 2005 Musical Big Concert - Passion of the Rain | 패션 오브 더 레인 | Dong-hyeon (Don Lockwood) | Little Angels Arts Center | December 23rd to 25th | |
| 2007 | Hedwig Concert with John Cameron Mitchell | 존 카메론 미첼과 함께하는 헤드윅 콘서트 | Hedwig | Jamsil Indoor Gymnasium | May 27–June 5 | |
| 2008 | HEDWIG 10th Anniversary! Hedwig Concert John Cameron Mitchell & Oh Man-seok | [헤드윅 콘서트] 존 카메론 미첼 & 오만석 | Hedwig | Olympic Park Olympic Hall | June 14 | |
| 2015 | Seoul Musical Festival - Opening Ceremony & Gala Concert | 2015 서울뮤지컬페스티벌 - 공동개막식 & 갈라콘서트 | 진행 | DDP (Dongdaemun Design Plaza) | August 19 | |
| 2016 | DMZ Peace Concert 2016 | 2016 DMZ 평화 콘서트 | Performer | Imjingak Peace Nuri Park and surrounding area | August 14 | |
| 2017 | The Musical Festival 2017 | 2017 더 뮤지컬 페스티벌 | Performer | Nanji Hangang Park | September 9–10 | |
| 2018 | Starlight Musical Festival - Incheon | 2018 스타라이트 뮤지컬 페스티벌 - 인천 | Performer | Paradise City | October 20–21 | |
| 2023 | The Perfect Ending - Hanam | 가장 완벽한 엔딩 - 하남 | Performer | Hanam Cultural & Arts Center Grand Theater (Geomdan Hall) | December 28–29 | |

=== Musical ===
Musical play performances
| Year | Title | | Role | Venue | Date | Ref. |
| Year | English | Korean | Role | Venue | Date | Ref. |
|---|---|---|---|---|---|---|
| 2001 | A Serenade of Sorrow | 애수의 소야곡 | Chang-ho | —N/a | | |
| 2001 | The Rocky Horror Show | 록키 호러쇼 | Rocky | Daehakro Polymedia Theater | December 8-20 | |
| 2002 | Oh! Happy Day | 오 해피데이 | Eros | Arunguji Small Theater | March 29–April 28 | |
| 2002 | Birds on the Deck | 갑판 위의 새들 | Dancer | Hoam Art Hall, Seoul | June 4-5 | |
| 2002 | Birds on the Deck | 갑판 위의 새들 | Dancer | Tokyo Arts Theater, Japan | June 8-9 | |
| 2002–2003 | Return to the Forbidden Planet | 포비든 플래닛 | Bosun | COEX Auditorium, Samseong-dong | December 21, 2002–February 9, 2003 | |
| 2003 | Indangsu Love Song | 인당수사랑가 | 1 person multi-reverse | CJ Towol Theater, Seoul Arts Center | June 7–29 | |
| 2003 | Grease | 그리스 | Danny Zuko, Doody, Eugene Florczyk | Polymedia Theater in Daehakro, Seoul | May 20–June 1 | |
| 2003 | Grease | 그리스 | Danny Zuko, Doody, Eugene Florczyk | Seoul Arts Center’s Towol Theater | June 7–29 | |
| 2003 | Grease | 그리스 | Danny Zuko, Doody, Eugene Florczyk | Daegu Citizens Center Auditorium | December 20th | |
| 2003-2004 | Grease | 그리스 | Danny Zuko, Doody, Eugene Florczyk | Dongsoong Art Center Dongsoong Hall | August 8–November 16 | |
| 2004 | Dalgona | 달고나 | bachelor wearing thick horn-rimmed glasses a guru in search of the Tao a jjangga on TV a boxer | Daehakro Arunguji Theater | July 11–August 8 | |
| 2004 | Dalgona | 달고나 | bachelor wearing thick horn-rimmed glasses a guru in search of the Tao a jjangga on TV a boxer | Star Stage (formerly One Pass Art Hall) | July 11–September 5 | |
| 2004 | Geum River Opera | 가극 금강 | Ha-nui | Bonghwa Arts Theater in Pyongyang | September 22–23 (canceled) | |
| 2004 | Geum River Opera | 가극 금강 | Ha-nui | Uijeongbu Arts Center | October 8-9 | |
| 2004 | Passion of the Rain | 패션 오브 더 레인 | Dong-hyeon (Don Lockwood) | Daehakro Inkel Art Hall Hall 1 | December 3 | |
| 2006 | Passion of the Rain | 패션 오브 더 레인 | Dong-hyeon (Don Lockwood) | Universal Art Center | December 29–31 | |
| 2005 | Hedwig and the Angry Inch | 헤드윅 | Hedwig | Daehak-ro Live Theater | April 12–June 26 | |
| 2005 | Geum River Opera | 가극 금강 | Ha-nui | 'June 15th Festival' Pyongyang | June 15 | |
| 2005 | Geum River Opera | 가극 금강 | Ha-nui | Ansan Arts Center | June 28th and 29th | |
| 2005 | Assassins | 암살자들 | Samuel Byck | CJ Towol Theater, Seoul Arts Center | July 9–30 | |
| 2005 | Winter Traveler | 겨울나그네 | Han Min-woo | National Theater Haewolim Theater | December 1–25 | |
| 2006 | Finding Kim Jong-wook | 김종욱 찾기 | Namja & Kim Jong-wook | JTN Art Hall 1 | June 2–August 15 | |
| 2007 | A Day | 하루 | Kang Young-won | Universal Art Center | January 6–February 4 | |
| 2008 | The Organ in My Heart | 내 마음의 풍금 | Kang Dong-soo | Hoam Art Hall | July 22–September 12 | |
| 2008 | The Organ in My Heart | 내 마음의 풍금 | Kang Dong-soo | Daegu Opera House | September 20–21 | |
| 2008 | The Organ in My Heart | 내 마음의 풍금 | Kang Dong-soo | Daejeon Arts Center Art Hall | September 25–27 | |
| 2009 | Dream Girls | 드림걸즈 | Curtis Taylor Jr. | Charlotte Theater | February 20–August 9 | |
| 2010 | The Toxic Avenger | 톡식히어로 | Melvin Ferd the Third, Toxie | Art One Theater 1 | July 30–October 16 | |
| 2011 | The Organ in My Heart | 내 마음의 풍금 | Kang Dong-soo | Hoam Art Hall | July 16–August 28 | |
| 2011 | The Toxic Avenger | 톡식히어로 | Melvin Ferd the Third, Toxie | KT&G Sangsangmadang Daechi Art Hall | August 14–October 10 | |
| 2011 | 200 Pounds Beauty | 미녀는 괴로워 일본 공연 | Han Sang-jun | Osaka Shochikuza | October 8–November 6 | |
| 2011-2012 | 200 Pounds Beauty | 미녀는 괴로워 일본 공연 | Han Sang-jun | Chungmu Art Center Grand Theater | December 6–February 5 | |
| 2012 | Hedwig and the Angry Inch | 헤드윅 | Hedwig | KT&G Sangsangmadang Daechi Art Hall | August 11–October 28 | |
| 2012 | Hedwig and the Angry Inch | 헤드윅 | Hedwig | MBC Lotte Art Hall | November 3–4 | |
| 2012 | Hedwig and the Angry Inch | 헤드윅 | Hedwig | Daegu Suseong Art Pia Yongji Hall | November 10–11 | |
| 2013 | Rebecca | 레베카 | Maxim DeWinter | LG Arts Center | January 12–March 31 | |
| 2013 | Those Days | 그날들 | Cha Jeong-hak | Daehakro Musical Center Main Theater | April 4–June 30 | |
| 2013 | Rebecca | 레베카 | Maxim De Winter | Daegu Gyeongnam Art Center | April 9–13 | |
| 2013 | Rebecca | 레베카 | Maxim De Winter | Gimhae Cultural Center Maru Hall | April 19–21 | |
| 2013 | Rebecca | 레베카 | Maxim De Winter | Busan Cultural Center Grand Theater | May 11–12 | |
| 2013 | Rebecca | 레베카 | Maxim De Winter | Cheonan Arts Center Main Theater | May 25–26 | |
| 2013 | Rebecca | 레베카 | Maxim De Winter | Goyang Aram Nuri Arts Center Aram Theater | June 1–2 | |
| 2013 | The Days | 그날들 | Cha Jeong-hak | Daejeon Arts Center Art Hall | July 5–7 | |
| 2013 | The Days | 그날들 | Cha Jeong-hak | Daegu Gyeongnam Art Center | July 19–21 | |
| 2013 | The Days | 그날들 | Cha Jeong-hak | Gyeonggi Arts Center Main Theater | August 2–4 | |
| 2013 | The Days | 그날들 | Cha Jeong-hak | Centum City Sohyang Theater Shinhan Card Hall | August 15–18 | |
| 2013 | The Days | 그날들 | Cha Jeong-hak | Ansan Culture & Arts Center Haedoji Theater | August 23–25 | |
| 2014 | Rebecca | 레베카 | Maxim De Winter | Blue Square Shinhan Card Hall | September 6–November 9 | |
| 2014 | Rebecca | 레베카 | Maxim De Winter | Korea Sound Culture Center Moak Hall | November 14–16 | |
| 2014 | Rebecca | 레베카 | Maxim De Winter | Daejeon Arts Center Art Hall | November 21–23 | |
| 2014 | Rebecca | 레베카 | Maxim De Winter | Daegu Gyeongnam Art Center | December 5–14 | |
| 2014 | Rebecca | 레베카 | Maxim De Winter | Centum City Sohyang Theater Shinhan Card Hall | December 19–21 | |
| 2014 | Rebecca | 레베카 | Maxim De Winter | Gwangju Culture & Arts Center Main Theater | December 26–28 | |
| 2014–2015 | Kinky Boots | 킹키부츠 | Lola | Chungmu Art Center Main Theater | December 2, 2014 – February 22, 2015 | |
| 2015 | Rebecca | 레베카 | Maxim De Winter | Ansan Culture & Arts Center Haedoji Theater | January 3–4 | |
| 2015-2016 | Okepi (Orchestra Pit) | 오케피 | Conductor | LG Art Center | December 18, 2015 – February 28, 2016 | |
| 2016 | Okepi (Orchestra Pit) | 오케피 | Conductor | Daejeon Arts Center Art Hall | March 18–20 | |
| 2016 | Okepi (Orchestra Pit) | 오케피 | Conductor | Goyang Aram Nuri Aram Theater | April 1–3 | |
| 2016 | Okepi (Orchestra Pit) | 오케피 | Conductor | Gunpo Cultural & Arts Center Suri Hall (Daegongyeonjang) | April 15–17 | |
| 2016 | Those Days | 그날들 | Cha Jeong-hak | GS Caltex Yeoulmaru Theater | December 23 – December 25, 2016 | |
| 2016 | Those Days | 그날들 | Cha Jeong-hak | Gyeonggi Arts Center Grand Theater | December 10 – December 11, 2016 | |
| 2016 | Those Days | 그날들 | Cha Jeong-hak | Centum City S.O! Theater Shinhan Card Hall | December 2 – December 4, 2016 | |
| 2016 | Those Days | 그날들 | Cha Jeong-hak | N/A | August 25 – November 3, 2016 | |
| 2017 | Those Days | 그날들 | Cha Jeong-hak | Seongnam Arts Center Opera House | January 21 – January 22, 2017 | |
| 2017 | Those Days | 그날들 | Cha Jeong-hak | Seoul Arts Centre Opera Theatre | February 7 – March 5, 2017 | |
| 2017 | Hedwig and the Angry Inch | 헤드윅 | Hedwig | Hongik University Daehakro Art Center Grand Theater | August 18 – November 5, 2017 | |
| 2017 | Hedwig and the Angry Inch | 헤드윅 | Hedwig | Andong Culture & Arts Center Woongbo Hall | November 23 – 25, 2017 | |
| 2017 | Hedwig and the Angry Inch | 헤드윅 | Hedwig | Centum City S.O! Theater Shinhan Card Hall | December 9 – 10, 2017 | |
| 2018 | Hedwig and the Angry Inch | 헤드윅 | Hedwig | Seongnam Arts Center Opera House | January 6 — 7, 2018 | |
| 2018 | Hedwig and the Angry Inch | 헤드윅 | Hedwig | Daegu Opera House | January 13 – 14, 2018 | |
| 2018 | Hedwig and the Angry Inch | 헤드윅 | Hedwig | Daejeon Arts Center Art Hall | January 27 – 28, 2018 | |
| 2018 | Man of La Mancha | 맨 오브 라만차 | Cervantes/ Don Quixote | Blue Square Shinhan Card Hall | April 12 – June 3 | |
| 2018 | Man of La Mancha | 맨 오브 라만차 | Cervantes/ Don Quixote | Ulsan Hyundai Arts Center Grand Theater | June 14 – June 16 | |
| 2018 | Man of La Mancha | 맨 오브 라만차 | Cervantes/ Don Quixote | Gimhae Arts & Sports Center Haeni Hall | June 22 – June 24 | |
| 2018 | Man of La Mancha | 맨 오브 라만차 | Cervantes/ Don Quixote | Seongnam Arts Center Opera House | July 6 – July 8 | |
| 2018 | Man of La Mancha | 맨 오브 라만차 | Cervantes/ Don Quixote | Centum City SOTETSU HOTEL THEATRE | July 13 – July 15 | |
| 2018 | Man of La Mancha | 맨 오브 라만차 | Cervantes/ Don Quixote | Goyang Aram Nuri Arts Center Aram Theater | July 27 – July 29 | |
| 2018 | Man of La Mancha | 맨 오브 라만차 | Cervantes/ Don Quixote | Daegu Arts Center | August 10 – August 12 | |
| 2018 | Man of La Mancha | 맨 오브 라만차 | Cervantes/ Don Quixote | Incheon Culture & Arts Center Grand Theater | August 24 – August 26 | |
| 2018 | Man of La Mancha | 맨 오브 라만차 | Cervantes/ Don Quixote | Gwangju Culture & Arts Center Grand Theater | August 31 – September 2 | |
| 2018-2019 | A Gentleman's Guide to Love and Murder | 젠틀맨스 가이드 | D'Ysquith | Hongik University Daehakro Art Center Grand Theater | November 9, 2018 – January 27, 2019 | |
| 2019 | A Gentleman's Guide to Love and Murder | 젠틀맨스 가이드 | D'Ysquith | Centum City SOTETSU HOTEL THEATRE | February 15 – February 17 | |
| 2019 | A Gentleman's Guide to Love and Murder | 젠틀맨스 가이드 | D'Ysquith | Suwon SK Artrium Grand Theater | March 1 – March 3 | |
| 2019 | Hedwig and the Angry Inch | 헤드윅 | Hedwig | Hongik University Daehakro Art Center Grand Theater | August 16 – November 3, 2019 | |
| 2019 | Hedwig and the Angry Inch | 헤드윅 | Hedwig | Icheon Art Hall Grand Theater | November 22 – November 23, 2019 | |
| 2019 | Hedwig and the Angry Inch | 헤드윅 | Hedwig | Gimhae Arts and Sports Center Ha-Nui Hall | December 14 – December 15, 2019 | |
| 2019 | Hedwig and the Angry Inch | 헤드윅 | Hedwig | Centum City SOTETSU HOTEL THEATRE | December 21 – December 29, 2019 | |
| 2020 | Hedwig and the Angry Inch | 헤드윅 | Hedwig | Daejeon Arts Center Art Hall | January 4 – January 5, 2020 | |
| 2020 | Hedwig and the Angry Inch | 헤드윅 | Hedwig | Uijeongbu Arts Center Grand Theater | January 18 – January 19, 2020 | |
| 2020–2021 | A Gentleman's Guide to Love and Murder | 젠틀맨스 가이드 | D'Ysquith | Hongik University Daehakro Art Center Grand Theater | November 20, 2020 – March 1, 2021 | |
| 2021 | Hedwig and the Angry Inch | 헤드윅 | Hedwig | Chungmu Art Center Grand Theater | July 30 – October 31, 2021 | |
| 2022 | A Gentleman's Guide to Love and Murder | 젠틀맨스 가이드 | D'Ysquith | Gwanglim Art Center BBCH Hall | November 13, 2021 – February 20, 2022 | |
| 2023 | Those Days | 그날들 | Cha Jeong-hak | Seoul Arts Center | July 12 to September 3 | |

=== Theater ===
Theater play performances of Oh
| Year | Title | | Role | Venue | Date | Ref. |
| Year | English | Korean | Role | Venue | Date | Ref. |
|---|---|---|---|---|---|---|
| 1999 | Faust | 파우스트 | Wagner | | | |
| 1999 | Cloud | 구름 | | The Korea National University of Arts' Theater | May 6th to 8th, | |
| 1999 | Cloud | 구름 | | Daehakro Algwahak small theater | May 14th to 15th | |
| 2000 | Tae | 태 | Danjong | | | |
| 2000 | Ot Goot-Sal | 옷굿-살 | Chorus | | | |
| 2000 | Lee | 이 (爾) | Gong-gil | | | |
| 2001 | Lee | 이 (爾) | Gong-gil | | | |
| 2002 | Man with Flowers | 꽃을 든 남자 | | Daehakro Academic Exhibition Blue Theater | August 27th to September 8th | |
| 2003 | Lee | 이 (爾) | Gong-gil | | | |
| 2004 | The Seagull | 갈매기 | Konstantin Gavrilovich Treplyov | Seoul Arts Center CJ Towol Theater | April 14–May 2 | |
| 2004 | Woyzeck | 보이체크 | Karl | Seoul Arts Center CJ Towol Theater | December 4–18 | |
| 2006 | Lee | 이(爾) | Gong-gil | LG Art Center | June 28–July 14 | |
| 2008-2009 | The Happy Life | 즐거운 인생 | Director | Chungmu Art Center Grand Theater Black | November 21–February 8 | |
| 2009 | The Happy Life | 즐거운 인생 | Director | Daegu Suseong Art Plaza Yongji Hall | March 14–15 | |
| 2009 | The Happy Life | 즐거운 인생 | Director | Chungnam National University Jeongsimhwa International Cultural Centre Jeongsimhwa Hall | April 4–5 | |
| 2010 | Lee | 이(爾) | Gong-gil | Seoul Arts Center's Towol Theater | February 27 to March 21, 2010 | |
| 2010 | Lee | 이(爾) | Gong-gil | MBC Lotte Art Hall | May 28–May 30 | |
| 2010-2011 | True West | 트루웨스트 | Lee (also Director) | Plus Theater (formerly Culture Space N.U.) | November 26, 2010 – May 1, 2011 | |
| 2013 | True West | 트루웨스트 | Austin | CJ Ajit Daehak-ro (formerly SM Art Hall) | February 21 - May 5 | |
| 2015 | True West | 트루웨스트 | Director | A Art Hall | August 13 to November 1, 2015 | |
| 2016 | True West Returns | 트루웨스트 리턴즈 | Director | Yegreen Theater | June 24 to August 28, 2016 | |
| 2017 | Three Days of Rain | 3일간의 비 | Director | Art One Theater 2nd Hall | July 11–September 10 | |
| 2018 | Doosan Humanities Theater 2018 Altruism - Nassim | 두산인문극장 2018 이타주의자 - 낫심 | | Doosan Art Center Space111 | April 10–29 | |
| 2020 | The Dresser | 더 드레서 | Norman | National Theater of Korea | November 18 – December 5, 2020 | |
| 2021–2022 | The Dresser | 더 드레서 | Norman | National Jeongdong Theatre | November 16, 2021–January 1, 2022 | |
| 2022 | The Dresser | 더 드레서 | Norman | GS Caltex Yeulmaru Grand Theatre, Yeosu | February 25–26 | |
| 2022 | True West | 트루웨스트 | Director | Daehak-ro, Theater OMT 2 | September 6 – November 13 | |
| 2023 | Three Days of Rain | 3일간의 비 | Director | Dongguk University Lee Hae-rang Arts Theater | July 25 – October 1 | |
| 2022–2023 | The Seagull | 갈매기 | Trigorin | Universal Arts Center | Dec 21-Feb 5 | |
| 2023 | The Seagull | 갈매기 | Trigorin | Gyeongju Arts Center | Feb 25 | |

== Discography ==
| Year | Song title | From the Album |
|---|---|---|
| 2001 | "The Sword of Damocles" | The Rocky Horror Show cast recording |
| 2002 | "Great Balls of Fire" "The Young Ones" "Born to Be Wild" | Return to the Forbidden Planet cast recording |
| 2003 | "Those Magic Changes" "Beauty School Dropout" | Grease cast recording |
| 2005 | "The Origin of Love" "Wicked Little Town" "Angry Inch" | Hedwig and the Angry Inch cast recording |
| 2006 | "종욱과 나라의 Love Theme" "한양서 김서방 찾기" "이젠 정말 만나야 할 때" "좋은 사람" "나라와 만석의 Love Theme" | Finding Kim Jong-wook cast recording |
| 2008 | "봄이다. 그치?" "커피향, 웃는 이유" "소풍, 때려쳐?!" "홍연이 안 왔어요" "나비의 꿈" "나의 사랑 수정" "Springtime" "내 마음의 풍금(Springtime/나비 Reprise)" | The Organ in My Heart cast recording |
| 2009 | "Steppin' to the Bad Side" "You Are My Dream" "Family" | Dreamgirls cast recording |
| 2011 | "별 (Star)" "누가 나를 알까?" | 200 Pounds Beauty cast recording |
| 2012 | "어떻게 변해요 (How Can I Change)" | Wild Romance OST |
| 2012 | "Tear Me Down" "The Origin of Love" "Sugar Daddy" "Angry Inch" "Wig in a Box" "Wicked Little Town" "The Long Grift" "Hedwig's Lament" "Exquisite Corpse" "Wicked Little Town (Reprise)" "Midnight Radio" | Hedwig and the Angry Inch cast recording |
| 2012 | "Springtime" | What's Up OST |
| 2013 | "At the abyss" "Help me through the night" "God, why?" "Never was a smile that cold" "Manderley in Flames" | Rebecca cast recording |

== Awards and nominations ==
| Year | Award | Category | Nominated work | Result |
|---|---|---|---|---|
| 2000 | The National Theater Association of Korea | Best New Actor | Yi | Won |
| 2004 | 10th Korea Musical Awards | Best Supporting Actor | Grease | Nominated |
| 2005 | 11th Korea Musical Awards | Most Popular Star | Hedwig and the Angry Inch | Won |
| 2005 | 11th Korea Musical Awards | Best Actor | Hedwig and the Angry Inch | Won |
| 2005 | MBC Drama Awards | Best New Actor | Shin Don | Nominated |
| 2006 | 12th Korea Musical Awards | Most Popular Star | Finding Kim Jong-wook | Won |
| 2006 | KBS Drama Awards | Best Couple Award with Yoon Eun-hye | The Vineyard Man | Won |
| 2006 | KBS Drama Awards | Popularity Award | The Vineyard Man | Won |
| 2006 | KBS Drama Awards | Best New Actor | The Vineyard Man | Won |
| 2006 | KBS Drama Awards | Excellence Award, Actor | The Vineyard Man | Nominated |
| 2007 | 43rd Baeksang Arts Awards | Best New Actor (TV) | The Vineyard Man | Nominated |
| 2007 | 2nd Golden Ticket Awards | 1st Ticket Power in a Musical | Finding Kim Jong-wook | Won |
| 2007 | 1st The Musical Awards | Most Popular Actor | A Day | Won |
| 2007 | 13th Korea Musical Awards | Most Popular Star | A Day | Won |
| 2007 | SBS Drama Awards | Excellence Award, Actor in a Serial Drama | The King and I | Won |
| 2008 | 45th Grand Bell Awards | Best New Actor | Our Town | Nominated |
| 2008 | 14th Korea Musical Awards | Best Actor | The Organ in My Heart | Nominated |
| 2009 | 3rd The Musical Awards | Best Actor | The Organ in My Heart | Nominated |
| 2009 | KBS Drama Awards | Excellence Award, Actor in a Daily Drama | Jolly Widows | Won |
| 2010 | KBS Drama Awards | Best Actor in a One-Act Drama/Special | Spy Trader Kim Chul-soo's Recent Condition | Nominated |
| 2013 | KBS Drama Awards | Excellence Award, Actor in a Serial Drama | Wang's Family | Nominated |
| 2014 | 8th Daegu International Musical Festival Awards | Star Award | Those Days | Won |
| 2019 | MBC Drama Awards | Excellence Award, Actor in a Monday-Tuesday Miniseries | Partners for Justice 2 | Won |
