= Choi Ji-ho =

South Korean actor and model

- Born: November 25, 1980 (age 45); Seoul, South Korea
- Education: Yongin University - Taekwondo
- Occupations: Actor; model
- Years active: 2003–present
- Agent: Triforce

Korean name
- Hangul: 최지호
- Hanja: 崔祉好
- RR: Choe Jiho
- MR: Ch'oe Chiho

Choi Ji-ho (born November 25, 1980) is a South Korean actor and model. He began his entertainment career in 2003 as part of Model Line's stable, walking the runways for Gucci, Armani, Nike, EXR, Lacoste, Dolce & Gabbana, as well as Korean designers Lee Ju-young, Choi Chang-ho and Noh Seung-eun. Choi then made his acting debut in 2007, and has since starred in stage musicals such as Finding Kim Jong-wook and Thrill Me, and the films Antique (2008) and Troubleshooter (2010).

== Filmography ==
=== Film ===
Year	Title	Role
2008	Antique	Nam Soo-yeong
2010	Troubleshooter	Eun Wang-jae
2010	Finding Mr. Destiny	Kim Jong-wook the soccer player (cameo)
2013	Man on the Edge	Wang Dae-sik
2015	Collective Invention	Chairman's assistant
2017	The Bros	Dispatch police (cameo)

=== Television series ===
Year	Title	Role
2007	Ugly Miss Young-ae 1	Ji-ho
2007	Time Between Dog and Wolf	"Giraffe"
2014	Inspiring Generation	Aka
2014	Flower Grandpa Investigation Unit	Kang So-ri's manager (cameo, episode 6)
2014	Gunman in Joseon	Murderer
2015	The Great Wives	Charles Jung
2022	Alchemy of Souls	Gil-ju

=== Variety show ===
Year	Title	Notes
2006	I Am a Model: Men	Cast member
2007	Hip Up Boys - Season 2	Cast member

=== Music video appearances ===
Year	Song title	Artist
2008	"Running"	Jung Jae-hyung
2009	"Restriction"	Fly to the Sky

== Theater ==
Year	Title	Role	Reprised
2009	Singles	Su-heon	
2009-2010	Finding Kim Jong-wook	Kim Jong-wook/First Love	2011-2012
2010	Thrill Me	Richard Loeb	
2011-2012	A Dramatic Night	Jung-hoon	
2014-2015	The Days	Dae-sik	

== Awards and nominations ==
Year	Award	Category	Nominated work	Result
2007	2nd Korea Model Association Awards	Best Model	—N/a	Won
