= Antique (film) =

2008 South Korean film

- Theatrical release poster
- Hangul: 서양 골동 양과자점 앤티크
- Hanja: 西洋 骨董 洋菓子店 앤티크
- RR: Seoyang goldong yanggwajajeom aentikeu
- MR: Sŏyang koltong yanggwajajŏm aent'ik'ŭ
- Directed by: Min Kyu-dong
- Written by: Min Kyu-dong; Kim Da-young; Lee Kyeong-ui
- Based on: Antique Bakery (manga) by Fumi Yoshinaga
- Produced by: Min Jin-su; Lee Yoo-jin
- Starring: Ju Ji-hoon; Kim Jae-wook; Yoo Ah-in; Choi Ji-ho
- Cinematography: Kim Jun-young
- Edited by: Kim Sun-min
- Music by: Jang Young-gyu; Dalpalan
- Production companies: Soo Film; Zip Cinema; Opus Pictures; United Pictures; Sponge; Finecut
- Distributed by: Showbox
- Release date: November 13, 2008
- Running time: 105 minutes
- Country: South Korea
- Languages: Korean; French
- Box office: US$5.6 million

Antique (Korean: 서양 골동 양과자점 앤티크) is a 2008 South Korean comedy thriller film, starring Ju Ji-hoon, Kim Jae-wook, Yoo Ah-in and Choi Ji-ho. It is based on the comic Antique Bakery by Fumi Yoshinaga. It was released in cinemas in South Korea on November 13, 2008.

It was invited to the 59th Berlin International Film Festival. It was released on DVD in the UK on February 11, 2013, as Antique Bakery, though its official English title in South Korea, and which it was promoted as at festivals internationally, is just Antique. As of March 2021, it has not been widely released in Northern America or Australia.

== Plot ==
As an heir to the family fortune, Jin-hyuk has money, the looks, the charm, everything except finding the love of his life. So he sets up a cake shop where women are sure to come. He hires Sun-woo, a talented patissier who had a crush on Jin-hyuk back in high school. Along with an ex-boxing champion Gi-beom and a clueless bodyguard Su-young, the four unique and handsome young men stir up the quiet neighborhood at their cake shop, Antique. Although seemingly careless and happy, each of the four men have unforgettable pasts that they are afraid to face, but their secrets slowly begin to unravel.

== Cast ==
- Ju Ji-hoon as Kim Jin-hyeok – "Antique" bakery owner
- Kim Jae-wook as Min Seon-woo – gay genius pâtissier
- Yoo Ah-in as Yang Ki-beom – boxing champion turned apprentice
- Choi Ji-ho as Nam Soo-yeong – bodyguard
- Andy Gillet as Jean-Baptise Evan
- Ko Chang-seok as gay club master
- Yeo Jin-goo as young Jin-hyeok
- Kim Jung-heon as Pretty worker
- Kim Min-sun as Jin-hyeok's girlfriend (cameo)
- Lee Young-jin as Jin-hyeok's girlfriend (cameo)
- Seo Young-hee as Jin-hyeok's girlfriend (cameo)
- Kim Chang-wan as old man
- Lee Hwi-hyang as the old man's girlfriend

== Reception ==
The film opened third at the box office grossing $1,495,183. The second weekend it rose up to the second place grossing $909,629. The film ended its run grossing $5,608,515 with 1,192,456 tickets sold nationwide. The film drew more than one million moviegoers within the first two weeks of its release.

== Awards and nominations ==
Year	Award	Category	Recipient	Result
2008	11th Director's Cut Awards	Best New Actor	Yoo Ah-in	Won
2009	45th Baeksang Arts Awards	Best New Actor – Film	Ju Ji-hoon	Nominated
2009	45th Baeksang Arts Awards	Most Popular Actor (Film)	Ju Ji-hoon	Won
2009	13th Fantasia International Film Festival	Best Film	Antique	Nominated
2009	22nd Austin Gay and Lesbian International Festival	aGLIFF Award	Antique	Nominated
2009	17th Icheon Chunsa Film Festival	Best Director	Min Kyu-dong	Nominated
2009	46th Grand Bell Awards	Best Art Direction	Jeon Kyung-ran	Nominated
