= Our Town (2007 film) =

- Hangul: 우리 동네
- RR: Uri dongne
- MR: Uri tongne
- Directed by: Jeong Gil-yeong
- Written by: Mo Hong-jin; Jeong Gil-yeong
- Produced by: Mo Hong-jin
- Starring: Oh Man-seok; Lee Sun-kyun; Ryu Deok-hwan
- Cinematography: Lee Gang-min
- Edited by: Choi Jae-geun; Eom Jin-hwa
- Music by: Jeong Jae-hwan
- Production companies: Cinema Service; IM Pictures Corp. Object Films; Motive Cinema
- Distributed by: CJ Entertainment
- Release date: November 29, 2007
- Running time: 114 minutes
- Country: South Korea
- Language: Korean
- Box office: US$2,643,251

Our Town (Korean: 우리 동네) is a 2007 South Korean crime thriller film written and directed by Jeong Gil-yeong, starring Oh Man-seok, Lee Sun-kyun and Ryu Deok-hwan. The film received a total of 377,591 admissions nationwide from released date 29 November 2007.

== Plot ==
A neighbourhood is terrorized by a serial killer who kills and hangs his female victims in a uniquely specific way. When struggling crime fiction novelist Kyung-ju kills his landlady, he stages it to resemble the other murders. Realizing that the crime appears to be a copycat, he sets out to find the killer with the help of his detective friend.

== Cast ==
- Oh Man-seok as Kyung-ju
- Lee Sun-kyun as Jae-sin
- Ryu Deok-hwan as Hyo-yi
  - Kang Yi-seok as young Hyo-yi
- Park Myung-shin as Yeo Sa-jang
- Jeong Hye-won as Kim So-yeon
  - Moon Ka-young as young So-yeon
- Lee Moo-saeng as Jeong Myeong-bo
- Yeom Hye-ran as Rice cake vendor

== Box office ==
Our Town was released in South Korea on November 29, 2007. It was ranked fourth at the box office on its opening weekend, grossing US$1,135,444, and as of December 23 it had grossed a total of US$2,643,251. The film received a total of 377,591 admissions nationwide.
