= Honest Candidate 2 =

South Korean comedy sequel film

- Promotional poster
- Hangul: 정직한 후보2
- Hanja: 正直한 候補2
- RR: Jeongjikhan hubo2
- MR: Chŏngjikhan hubo2
- Directed by: Jang Yu-jeong
- Written by: Jang Yu-jeong; Heo Sung-hye
- Starring: Ra Mi-ran; Kim Mu-yeol; Seo Hyun-woo; Yoon Kyung-ho; Park Jin-joo
- Cinematography: Yoo Il-seung
- Production companies: Hong Film; Soo Film
- Distributed by: Next Entertainment World
- Release date: September 28, 2022
- Country: South Korea
- Language: Korean
- Box office: est. US$6.4 million

Honest Candidate 2 (Korean: 정직한 후보 2; RR: Jeongjikhan hubo 2) is a 2022 South Korean comedy film directed by Jang Yu-jeong, starring Ra Mi-ran, Kim Mu-yeol, Yoon Kyung-ho and Park Jin-joo. A sequel of the 2020 film Honest Candidate, it was wrapped up on October 31, 2021, after 3 months filming. Honest Candidate 2 was released on September 28, 2022.

== Synopsis ==
A sequel of 2020 film Honest Candidate, it is a comedy about Joo Sang-sook (Ra Mi-ran), called the 'mouth of truth', who is dreaming of her return to politics after falling out of the Seoul mayor election.

== Cast ==
- Ra Mi-ran as Joo Sang-sook
- Kim Mu-yeol as Park Hee-cheol
- Yoon Kyung-ho as Bong Man-sik
- Seo Hyun-woo as Cho Tae-joo
- Park Jin-joo as Bong Man-soon
- Yoon Doo-joon as Kang Yeon-joon

Supporting

- Lee Jin-hee as Lee Yeon-mi, Joo Sang-sook's administrative secretary.
- Yoon Sa-bong as Ms. Han

Special appearance

- Yoo Jun-sang as President of the Republic of Korea
- Kim Jae-hwa as Rim Seon-hee, Representative of North Korea
- On Joo-wan as Kim Jun-young, TV news anchor
- Kim Ah-ra as Announcer from the North

== Production ==
On February 9, 2021, when Ra Mi-ran won the Best Actress Award for her role in Honest Candidate at the 41st Blue Dragon Film Awards, a sequel was confirmed. At award ceremony she said, "Actually, I'm trying to film Honest Candidate 2. I will try to be your belly button thief next year." On August 6, the casting of Ra Mi-ran, Kim Mu-yeol and Yoon Kyung-ho reprising their roles from Honest Candidate was confirmed. In addition Seo Hyun-woo, Park Jin-joo, and Yoon Doo-joon joined the cast.

The principal photography began on July 31, 2021 and was wrapped up on October 31.

== Accolades ==
Award ceremony	Year	Category	Nominee / Work	Result	Ref.
Bechdel Day	2023	Bechdel Choice 10 — Film	Honest Candidate 2	Top 10	
