= The Bros =

- Theatrical release poster
- Hangul: 부라더
- RR: Buradeo
- MR: Puradŏ
- Directed by: Jang Yu-jeong
- Written by: Jang Yu-jeong; Heo Seong-hye
- Produced by: Yi Jae-min
- Starring: Ma Dong-seok; Lee Dong-hwi; Lee Hanee
- Edited by: Kim Sun-min
- Music by: Kim Jun-seong
- Production companies: Hong Film; Soo Film
- Distributed by: Megabox Plus M
- Release date: November 2, 2017
- Running time: 102 minutes
- Country: South Korea
- Language: Korean
- Box office: US$10.8 million

The Bros (Korean: 부라더) is a 2017 South Korean comedy-drama film directed by Jang Yu-jeong. It is director Jang's first film in seven years since directing Finding Mr. Destiny and is based on the musical The Brave Brothers, which she produced. The film stars Ma Dong-seok, Lee Dong-hwi and Lee Hanee.

== Plot ==
Seok-bong is a penniless history teacher who dreams of discovering lost treasure. His younger brother Joo-bong is an ambitious junior executive at a construction firm. They meet on their way to their father's funeral in their hometown of Andong, neither of them having seen him or one another since a disastrous scene at the funeral of their mother. En route, the brothers hit a woman with their car, after which she suffers amnesia. In their very traditional family, the brothers, especially Seok-bong as the eldest, are expected to perform many ceremonial duties as part of the funeral rites. However, Seok-bong is mostly interested in searching for relics or buried treasure that could help him repay a debt, while Joo-bong risks losing his job if he cannot obtain permission to build a highway construction project for his company through the family's land. As the multi-day funeral elapses, the brothers learn more about their family, one another, and themselves.

== Cast ==
- Ma Dong-seok as Lee Seok-bong
  - Kwon Min-joon as young Seok-bong
- Lee Dong-hwi as Lee Joo-bong
  - Kwon Min-jae as young Joo-bong
- Lee Hanee as Oh Ro-Ra
- Jo Woo-jin as Lee Mi-bong
- Song Young-chang as Dang-sook
- Song Sang-eun as Mi-bong's wife
- Jung Jae-jin as Grandfather's cousin
- Lee Ji-ha as Dang-sook's mother
- Lee Bong-ryun as Cousin's wife
- Heo Sung-tae as Monk / Hyeong-bae
- Chae Dong-hyun as Beop-jeong
- Jeong Soon-won as Team leader Go
- Song Won-soo as Elder Lee Seong-deok
- Kim Ji-han as Elder Lee Man-deok
- Park Jong-gook as Elder Lee Soon-deok / Confucian scholar 1
- Kim Jong-ho as Elder Lee Beom-goo
- Kang Hee-joong as Elder Lee Wan-go
- Sin Sin-Beom as Elder Lee Gwi-yal
- Son Young-soon as Enraged grandmother
- Yoon Tae-hee as Young grandmother
- Park Jung-pyo as Mr. Park
- Ahn Se-ho as Mr. Ahn
- Han Kuk-jin as Mr. Shin
- Jeon Moo-song as Choon-bae
- Sung Byoung-sook as Soon-rye
- Seo Yea-ji as Sa-ra
- Ji Chang-wook as Young Choon-bae
- Oh Man-seok as Representative Oh
- Kim Kang-hyun as Han-ji
- Seo Hyun-chul as Eldest grandson
- Choi Ji-ho as Dispatch police

== Production ==
Principal photography began on January 6, 2017, and wrapped on March 5, 2017.

== Release and reception ==
The film was released in the local cinemas on November 2, 2017.

During the opening weekend the film sold 605,690 tickets at the box office, trailing behind Thor: Ragnarok which was released at the same time in Korean cinemas. By the ninth day since the film was released, The Bros surpassed 1 million viewers.
