= Chang Youjeong =

South Korean scriptwriter (born 1976)

- Born: 1976 (age 49–50); Gwangju, South Jeolla Province, South Korea
- Education: Korea National University of Arts; Korea University
- Occupations: Playwright, director
- Years active: 2002–present
- Notable work: Finding Mr. Destiny

Korean name
- Hangul: 장유정
- RR: Jang Yujeong
- MR: Chang Yujŏng

Chang Youjeong (Korean: 장유정, born 1976) is a South Korean playwright and director of theater, musicals, and film. Some of her notable works include the musicals Kiss Me Tiger, Finding Mr. Destiny, Oh! While You Were Sleeping, and Brothers Were Brave. Chang has received critical acclaim and awards for her work, including the 12th Korea Musical Awards for Lyrics and Best Work (2006), the 1st Musical Awards for Lyrics and Script (2007), and the 3rd Musical Awards for Lyrics and Script (2009).

She made her debut as film director in 2010 with Finding Mr. Destiny, a movie adaptation of her own hit musical with the same title. Afterward, she directed other films such as The Bros (2017), Honest Candidate (2020), and Honest Candidate 2 (2022).

== Early life ==
Chang Youjeong was born in 1976 in Gwangju, South Jeolla Province. She was raised in the countryside of Yeosu by her maternal grandparents. As a child, she learned to play the flute and gayageum. She also studied pansori and won the grand prize for it at the Honam Arts Festival.

Chang's interest in acting was sparked when she attended a church retreat and witnessed a theater performance by college students. This encounter inspired her to join a theater club while studying Korean literature at Korea University. She then studied in England from 1997 to 1998 and spent her part-time money watching musical performances like The Phantom of the Opera and Cats. The following year, she visited India and was inspired by the vibrant dancing and singing in Bollywood movies; this sparked, within her, the idea of combining the solemnity of British works with the popular and comical aspects of Indian works to create a unique performance. At the time, however, she didn't realize she could write it herself.

When Chang returned to South Korea, she saw a program promoting theater and felt drawn to that path. In 2000, she re-enrolled at the Korea National University of Arts to study directing in the Department of Theater. As a student, Chang was a cinephile and additionally had the opportunity to take classes in the film department, located across the hall; there, she met and learned from the director Byun Young-joo. She also took a class on writing musicals taught by American professor Calvin McClinton.

== Career ==
=== Songsan Night Flowers and Kiss Me Tiger ===
During her studies at the Korea National University of Arts, Chang started writing plays. Her debut work as a director was There, Silently, a workshop piece for Yeonwoo Stage. In 2001, Chang began writing The Tiger Maiden is Having an Affair based on "The Tale of Kim Hyeon-gam-ho" from the fifth volume of Samguk Yusa; the tale is about the unrequited love story between a woman, who lives as a tiger by day and a human by night, and an innocent young man named Kim Hyeon. The story, which goes back and forth between the past and the present, is filled with Korean humor.

The performance was first presented in 2002 under the title Songnyeon Yahwa by the theater company Dure. The composition was overseen by musician Kim Hye-seong, and the musical was directed by Son Nam-mok. It was performed at the Munhwa Ilbo Hall from July 4–25, 2002, starring Eom Ki-jun, Chu Jeong-hwa, Kwon Geun-yong, Shin Mun-seong, Jang Geum-jun, Lim Ki-hong, and others. It was performed again the following year at the Daehangno Arunguji Small Theater from April 9 to May 11, 2003. The cast included Song Chang-ui, Han Ae-ri, Kim Hyeon-tae, Lee Ji-won, Kim Na-young, Lee Gil-woo, and Kim Jin-tae.

After graduating from the Korea National University of Arts in 2004, Chang began working in theater and film. While working as an assistant director, she earned less than 5 million won a year. In order to support herself, she also wrote movie scripts. Meanwhile, she wrote a musical script called Finding Kim Jong-wook. She worked tirelessly, often sacrificing sleep; after a year and a half, she returned to the stage.

In 2005, Kang directed the musical Love Quilt which was performed at the Seoul Education and Culture Center Grand Theater from December 16–20. It was created to teach children the value of family; the story follows children and young magicians who want to change their parents but learn to appreciate and cherish them during their adventures. The cast included Bae Moon-joo, Kim Sam-seok, Kang Mi-ri, and others.

In 2006, The Tiger Maiden is Having an Affair was performed under the title Kiss Me Tiger at the Sejong Center for the Performing Arts Small Theater from June 18 to July 6. Also in 2006, Chang acted as director for the musical Lee produced by Seoul Arts Center.

=== Oh! While You Were Sleeping ===
While recovering from a car accident, Chang stayed home and wrote a musical inspired by her hospital experience where patients required constant care to prevent bedsores. Her volunteering in Eumseong, Chungcheongbuk-do, also influenced the idea. Chang addressed her mental health challenges by offering her services and stayed for a month and a half due to a shortage of volunteers. She then penned the script for a musical called Shall I Dress You Up? as part of her graduation works in 2003. Set in a Catholic charity hospital, the musical revolves around Choi Byung-ho, a spinal paralysis patient who goes missing the night before his scheduled year-end television interview for a local charity program.

In 2005, Shall I Dress You Up? became the first musical production of the Yeonwoo Theater Company; its title was changed to Oh! While You Were Sleeping. Directed by Chang herself, the musical premiered at the Daehakro Yeonwoo Small Theater from December 1, 2005, to January 8, 2006. It features original songs by Kim Hye-sung, who had previously worked with Chang on Songsan Night Flowers. Renowned guitarist Lee Seong-jun was the music director, with choreographer Kim So-yi, stage designer Kim Kyung-hee, lighting designer Sung-Geun Joo, costume designer Ryu Se-jin, sound designer Lee Ji-ho, makeup designer Chae Song-hwa, and stage director Do Hyun-ji.

The production was a huge success, with all 90 seats filled to capacity daily and praise for the vocal performances of Jin Seon-kyu as Choi Byung-ho, Lee Sang-eun as Doctor Lee, and versatility of Jeon Byeong-wook as Peter in blending serious and comedic elements. The production also won the Writer Award and the Best Musical Award at the 12th Korea Musical Awards. Additionally, the production won the Best Work Award and the Scriptwriter Award for Chang at the 12th Korea Musical Awards. It was also nominated for the Best Re-Performance Award at the 1st Musical Awards. After the premiere's success, offers for Chang poured in: "It was so scary... because I had just gotten the flicker of a 200-seat stage and I woke up to this overwhelming amount of promise and expectation. Everyone waits for an opportunity to come along, but I knew that if I grabbed for anything more than that, my inadequacies would be exposed."

The musical continued running at the Daehangno Art Theater Tree and Water from September 2006 to July 2007. New actors Kim Ji-sung, Kim Jae-beom, Kim Moon-sung, Kim Ji-sun, and Oh Yoon-joo joined the cast with Jeon Byeong-wook and Yoo Ha-na, who had appeared in the 2005 premiere.

In 2007, the fourth season of the show ran from January 6 to July 22 at the Daehakro Arts Center Hall 4. The cast included Jeong Ui-wook and Park Hoon as Father Peter, Kim Moon-seong and Ahn Se-ho as Choi Byung-ho, Park Bo-kyung and Lee Jin-hee as Choi Min-hee, Yoo Ha-na and Kim Na-jung as Kim Jung-yeon, Kim Jae-beom and Seong Du-seop as Doctor Lee, Kim Ji-seong and Kim Jin-hee as Lee Gil-rye, and Park So-young as Jeong Sook-ja. In 2008, the fifth season began on July 25 at Le Meilleur Theater and concluded on October 26. Since 2016, Lee Ji-yeon took over as director.

=== Melodrama ===
While writing the foundation for Finding Kim Jong-wook that was developed from 2002, Chang wrote a play script titled Melodrama. It became the third work of Ida's Stage Discovery Series organized by Ida Entertainment in 2007. The play centers around five characters: Kim Chan-il and Kang Seo-kyung, who have been married for 10 years; and siblings Park Mi-hyeon and Park Jae-hyun, along with their friend Ahn So-yi. The siblings and Ahn So-yi were involved in a car accident in their youth, resulting in the loss of their parents and Ahn So-yi's brother; Mi-hyeon suffered a loss of intelligence, while Jae-hyun received a heart transplant from Ahn So-yi's deceased brother. Following the accident, Jae-hyun becomes engaged to Ahn So-yi, and it turns into chaos after Kang Seo-kyung has an affair with Park Jae-hyun while Kim Chan-il has an affair with Park Mi-hyeon.

With Chang as director, Melodrama was first performed at Daehangno Cultural Space Ida 2nd Theater from September 9 to November 4, 2007. The cast included Jo Han-chul, Chang Young-nam, Kim Ji-seong, Lee Shin-seong, Lee Jin-hee, and Park So-young. It was subsequently extended from November 8 to December 31 that year. Later, the play won of the 2008 Dong-A Theater Award, after which it was re-performed at Daehangno Cultural Space Ida 2 from September 5 to November 2, 2008. Kim Sung-ryung joined the original cast, replacing Chang Young-nam as Yoo-kyung; Kim Jin-hee and Jeong Dong-hyun replaced Lee Shin-seong.

In January 2015, Melodrama returned for the first time in 6 years. This stage was co-organized by Seoul Arts Center (President Hak-chan Ko) and Ida Entertainment. Running until February 15, it was produced by Sang-won and held at the Seoul Arts Center Free Small Theater in Nambuhwan-ro, Seocho District, Seoul. It starred Park Won-sang and Choi Dae-hoon as Chan-il, Bae Hae-sun and Hong Eun-hee as Seo-kyung, Park Sung-hoon and Jo Kang-hyun as Jae-hyeon, Kim Na-mi and Park Min-jung as So-yi, and Jeon Kyung-soo as Mi-hyeon.

=== Finding Mr. Destiny ===
Inspired by a drunk man at Dolgoji Station in Seoul in 2002, Chang wrote the hit musical Finding Kim Jong-wook. She had gone to India three times for further research to develop the story and characters. While the plot and characters were finalized, Chang needed to rationalize why the protagonist, Ji-woo, didn't search for her first love, Kim Jong-wook, despite having his resident registration card; once she resolved this issue, however, she completed the script in just three days. This musical became her first full-fledged directing work.

The musical began as a university performance directed by herself and composed by fellow student Kim Hye-seong. The production, which had a budget of ₩100,000 (US$87.31), starred Kim Ji-hyun as the female lead, Jeon Byeong-wook as Kim Jong-wook, and Min Jun-ho in multiple roles; it was performed as a graduation performance at the Black Box Theater of Korea National University of Arts. The performance was well received by their professors, leading to an official invitation to the 15th Istropolitana Project, an international student theater festival held in Bratislava, Slovakia from June 26 to 30, 2004. In December of that year, Dolgochi, (Note: Dolgochi (Korean: 극단 돌곶이; RR: Geukdan Dolgochi; lit. 'Theater Troupe Stone Wall') was established in 2002, Director Kim Gwang-rim by as official theater company of Theater Institute of Korea National University of Arts.) the theater club of the university, performed the musical at Jayu Small Theater for three days as an incubator performance with Kim Ji-hyun reprising her role. An encore performance took place in the same venue in February 2005. The incubator performance was selected as the best work at CJ Entertainment's Musical Showcase, after which CJ Entertainment acquired the performance rights in 2004 and collaborated with Musical Haven for the joint production.

Following a survey of 1,000 musical enthusiasts by CJ Entertainment in 2005, Oh Man-seok and Um Ki-joon, the top-ranked male actors, were selected as leads. Both actors were popular among the main target audience of women in their 20s and 30s and have previously worked together in popular musicals; the female lead was Oh Na-ra. Additionally, the production company incorporated audience feedback into marketing, creating posters based on survey results about first loves. A photo exhibition titled April in Love featuring the cast was held at Daehangno Semihwarang. The company also introduced a new royalty payment system for lyricists and composers based on sales.

Now directed by Kim Dal-joong, the musical premiered on June 2, 2006, and ran at Daehangno Arts Center 1 until July 30, 2006. It then achieved a record-breaking seat occupancy rate of over 92% (80% paid). As a result, CJ Entertainment decided to extend the run of the musical by two weeks to August 15. It went on to win four awards at the 1st Musical Awards, with Chang winning Best Lyricist and Best Screenwriter, Jeon Byeong-wook winning Best Supporting Actor, and Oh Man-seok and Oh Na-ra winning Most Popular Actor and Most Popular Actress, respectively. The musical was also nominated for Best Composition (Kim Hye-sung) and Best Work. It won first place in the category of Best Creative Musical of 2006, voted by Interpark netizens.

In September 2006, the musical Finding Kim Jong-wook held auditions for the cast and returned for a second season in December 2006 with Chang as director. Oh Na-ra reprised her role as the female lead, An Yu-jin joined her in the same role, while Shin Sung-rok, Won Ki-joon, and Jeon Byeong-wook—the latter of whom was popular as a multi-man at the time of the premiere—were triple-cast as a Kim Jong-wook. The multi-man role, which included 18 different roles, was played by Kim Se-jun. The production was staged at the Seoul Daehangno Arts Center in December 2006.

==== Other directors ====
For the third season, which was directed by Kim Ji-yeon, the female lead role was triple-cast with Oh Na-ra, Ahn Yu-jin, and Kim Ji-hyun sharing the role. The male leads were played by Park Dong-ha, Kim Mu-yeol, and Kim Jae-beom. The multi-man role was played by Lim Ki-hong and Jin Seon-kyu. Under the direction of Kim Ji-yeon and the musical direction of Jeong Jun, the production opened at Daehakro Arts Plaza on October 23, 2007.

Kim Dong-yeon joined as the fourth director in the middle of season 3 in 2008. For the fall 2008 season, the musical was staged as an open run at Daehangno Arts Center 1 starting on September 5. Lee Yul alternated the lead role of Kim Jong-wook with Kim Jae-beom and Jeong Min. In the role of a woman looking for her first love, Jo Min-ah and Kwak Sun-young were joined by the original Kim Ji-hyun. The multi-man role, with 22 roles, was triple-cast with Lee Jang-hee, Moon Yong-hyun, and Jo Hui.

The fourth season in 2009, directed by Kim Dong-yeon, featured a new stage design with upgraded lighting, music, and choreography. The new male leads were Kim Tae-han and Jo Kang-hyun, and the female leads were Jeon Mi-do and Choi Bo-young, all selected through an open audition with over 400 applicants on February 9, 2009. They performed alongside Oh Na-ra and Park Dong-ha from the previous season, with Kim Jong-goo and Choi Dae-hoon playing a multi-man role portraying 22 characters.

=== Brothers Were Brave ===
Chang and music director Jang So-young worked together for the musical Brothers Were Brave, a family story is set in Andong, North Gyeongsang Province. The plot revolves on conflict between two brothers Lee Seok-bong and Lee Joo-bong of the Andong Lee clan who attend their father's funeral over their father's inheritance (a winning lottery ticket) and the girl next door, Aurora. It debuted in 2008, featuring the main characters Lee Seok-bong played by Park Jung-hwan and Lee Joo-bong played by Song Yong-jin. The show premiered at Jayu Theater in Daehangno on March 22 and ran until April 6 as the inaugural production of the Well-Made musical series by PMC Production in 2008. In November, the second performance moved to the 600-seat Doosan Art Center Yeongang Hall. In May 2009, the third performance served as the opening performance of COEX Artium, a venue with a capacity of 808 seats.

=== Musical Legally Blonde ===
Chang and music director Chang So-young worked together again in the Korean premiere of the Broadway musical Legally Blonde produced by PMC Production. For this production, Lee Ji-hye participated in the adaptation, and Kang Ok-soon was the choreographer. The show was performed at the COEX Artium in Samseong-dong from November 7, 2009, to February 28, 2010.

Based on Amanda Brown's 2001 novel of the same name, the film Legally Blonde was first a hit movie starring Reese Witherspoon before being adapted again for the Korean stage in 2007. In Chang's version, Lee Ha-nui, Kim Ji-woo, and Jessica were triple-cast as Elle Woods. The 2010 encore was performed at the COEX Artium in Samseong-dong from November 19, 2010, to March 20, 2011.

=== Finding Mr. Destiny ===
Around 2006, Chang prepared a romantic comedy with a female character as the main lead. At that time, she was also gearing up for her directorial debut. The project was a comedy but had a bit of a strong tone; unfortunately, it fell through in the end. Later, she worked on two screenplay projects, one being a thriller and the other a romantic comedy. When Oh! While You Were Sleeping was in pre-production, she did the final adaptation. Despite trying her hand at several projects, however, none of them panned out successfully. Even the film adaptation rights for Oh! While You Were Sleeping and Brothers Were Brave were returned to her. She thus began to doubt if movies were the right path for her until one day she met CEO Min Jin-soo and director Min Kyu-dong on an airplane.

A year later, Min Jin-soo and Min Kyu-dong approached her to collaborate on a musical. Initially, she declined due to her schedule, but a few months later, they proposed turning Finding Mr. Kim Jong-wook into a film and suggested that she direct it. Despite their efforts to persuade her, she was initially hesitant. Eventually, she accepted the role of director.

In 2010, CJ Entertainment decided to adapt the musical Finding Mister Destiny into a film. This marked the first time a domestically created musical had been turned into a movie. CJ Entertainment served as the investor, and the film was produced by the company Soo Film. The romantic comedy portrays the love story between the female protagonist, who cannot forget her first love Kim Jong-wook whom she met while traveling in India, and the man who attempts to locate her first love through the First Love Finding Company. The role of the female protagonist Seo Ji-woo, who seeks her first love, was portrayed by Im Soo-jung. Gong Yoo played the role of the male protagonist, Han Ki-joon. The film also features 13 actors from the musical Kim Jong-wook including Kim Dong-wook, Shin Sung-rok, Oh Man-seok, Kim Moo-yeol, Jeong Seong-hwa, and Um Ki-joon all making cameo appearances.

=== Those Days ===
Chang devoted the whole of 2012 to writing Those Days, a jukebox mystery musical featuring 25 songs sung by the late singer Kim Kwang-seok, including "A Private's Letter," "Around Thirty," "I Loved You," and "Becoming Dust." It also marked another collaboration between Chang and music director Jang So-young worked together again. The story revolves around the disappearance of the president's daughter and her bodyguard at a concert commemorating the 20th anniversary of Korea-China diplomatic relations, and the head of the Blue House security team assigned to solve the case recalls the incident 20 years ago when his partner disappeared with an unidentified woman who was in charge of his security, and investigates the connection between the two incidents. The key is how well Kim Kwang-seok's songs fit into the story. This is the inherent limitation of a jukebox musical. A jukebox musical is also Chang's first challenge. Produced by Ida Entertainment, it was performed as the opening work at the Daehakro Musical Center Grand Theater from April to the end of June in 2013.

Since its premiere, These Days continued through seasons until 2020, surpassing 550,000 audience members total.

=== The Bros ===
In 2017, Chang released The Bros, a film based on her musical Brothers Were Brave. It follows the story of Seok-bong (played by Ma Dong-seok) who has invested all his fortune in excavating relics, as well as his younger brother Joo-bong (played by Lee Dong-hwi) who is on the verge of losing his job; eventually, they meet Aurora (Lee Hanee) after a chance accident, after which Aurora reveals a secret that changes their lives and leads to a transformation of their hometown of Andong. The film showcases Andong's historical sites, including the Uiseong Kim Clan's ancestral home and the Toegye Taesil, thus adding authenticity to the story. After seven years of challenges, Chang completed the film, and it premiered on November 2, 2017. Principal photography had started on January 6, 2017, and ended on March 5 of that year.

=== Honest Candidate ===
Chang's third film, Honest Candidate, starred Ra Mi-ran, Kim Mu-yeol, Na Moon-hee, Yoon Kyung-ho, and Jang Dong-joo and was distributed by NEW and produced by Soofilm and Hongfilm. It was based on the hit film of the same name (original title: O Candidato Honesto) that was released in Brazil in 2014 and subsequently ranked first at the box office. Chang's version tells the story of Joo Sang-sook, a three-term member of the National Assembly for whom lying is the easiest thing to do; suddenly, he becomes unable to lie one day before an election. Chang's film succeeded in the domestic box office by not only presenting comical situations involving deceit but also showing a refreshing take on satire. A sequel was released in 2018.

On February 9, 2021, at the 41st Blue Dragon Film Awards, Ra Mi-ran won the Best Actress Award for her role in Honest Candidate. During her acceptance speech, she confirmed that a sequel to the film was in the works. On August 6, 2021, the casting for Honest Candidate 2 was announced. Ra Mi-ran, Kim Mu-yeol, and Yoon Kyung-ho were confirmed to be reprising their roles from the first film. Additionally, Seo Hyun-woo, Park Jin-joo, and Yoon Doo-joon joined the cast. Principal photography for Honest Candidate 2 began on July 31, 2021 and wrapped up on October 31 of that later.

=== Other ===
Chang is a mentor at the Chungmu Art Center. In 2018, she served as deputy director and closing ceremony director for the 2018 Pyeongchang Olympics. In 2023, Chang's works was screened as part of an exhibition of Korean female directors alongside works by Yoon Ga-eun, Yoon Dan-bi, Jung Joo-ri, Han Ji-won, Kim Se-in, and others at the 19th installment of the Monterrey International Film Festival in Mexico.

== Filmography ==
=== Film ===
| Year | Title | Director | Scriptwriter | Ref. |
|---|---|---|---|---|
| 2010 | Finding Mr. Destiny | Chang You-jeong | Chang You-jeong | |
| 2017 | The Bros | Chang You-jeong | Chang You-jeong; Heo Seong-hye | |
| 2020 | Honest Candidate | Chang You-jeong | Chang You-jeong; Heo Seong-hye | |
| 2022 | Honest Candidate 2 | Chang You-jeong | Chang You-jeong; Heo Seong-hye | |

== Stage ==
=== Musical ===
Musical credit(s)
| Year | Title | | Role | | | Ref. |
| Year | English | Korean | Playwright | Lyricist | Director | Ref. |
|---|---|---|---|---|---|---|
| 2002 | Songsan Night Flower | 송산야화 | Adaptation | Yes | No | |
| 2004 | Finding Mr. Destiny | 김종욱 찾기 | Yes | Yes | Yes | |
| 2005 | Oh! While You were Sleeping | 오 당신이 잠든사이 | Yes | Yes | Yes | |
| 2005 | Love Quilt | 러브퀼트 | No | No | Yes | |
| 2006 | Lee | 이 (爾) | No | No | Yes | |
| 2006 | Kiss Me Tiger | 키스미타이거 | Yes | Yes | Yes | |
| 2008 | Brothers were Brave | 형제는 용감했다 | Yes | Yes | Yes | |
| 2010 | Legally Blond | 금발이 너무해 | No | No | Yes | |
| 2014–2015 | Those Days | 그날들 | Yes | Yes | Yes | |

=== Theater ===
List of stage play(s)
| Year | Title | | Role | Theater | Date | Ref. |
| Year | English | Korean | Role | Theater | Date | Ref. |
|---|---|---|---|---|---|---|
| 2007 | Melodrama | 멜로드라마 | Director | Daehak-ro Cultural Space Ida 2 Hall | Sep 8 – Nov 4 | |
| 2008 | Melodrama | 멜로드라마 | Director | Daehak-ro T.O.M. Hall 2 | Sep 5 – Nov 2 | |
| 2012–2013 | The Vagina Monologues | 버자이너 모놀로그 | Moderator | Chungmu Art Hall Small Theater Blue | October 26, 2012, to January 6, 2013 | |
| 2014–2015 | Melodrama | 멜로드라마 | Director | Seoul Arts Center Free Small Theater | December 31 – February 15 | |
| 2015 | Melodrama | 멜로드라마 | Director | Seoul Arts Center Opera House Jayu Small Theater | January 26 to February 15 | |
| 2015 | Melodrama | 멜로드라마 | Director | Haneulyeon Theatre, Busan Cinema Centre | April 10 to 11 | |
| 2020 | The Dresser | 더 드레서 | Director | National Theater of Korea | November 18 – December 5, 2020 | |
| 2021–2022 | The Dresser | 더 드레서 | Director | National Jeongdong Theatre | November 16, 2021 – January 1, 2022 | |
| 2022 | The Dresser | 더 드레서 | Director | GS Caltex Yeulmaru Grand Theatre, Yeosu | February 25–26 | |

== Publications ==
Publication by Chang
| Year | Title | | Publisher | Published date | ISBN | Ref. |
| Year | English | Korean | Publisher | Published date | ISBN | Ref. |
|---|---|---|---|---|---|---|
| 2007 | Oh! While You were Sleeping (Note: The scriptbook consists of scripts of several musicals written by Jang Yu-jeong, including "Oh! While You Were Sleeping," "Finding Mr. Kim Jong-wook," and "Brothers Were Brave," as well as the play "Melodrama.") | 오 당신이 잠든사이 | Random House | December 2007 | ISBN 978-8-92-551600-4 | |
| 2010 | Finding Kim Jong-wook (Note: Novel adaptation written by Jeon A-ri based on original by Jang Yu-jeong.) | 김종욱 찾기 | Noblemine | November 2010 | ISBN 978-8-90-111500-9 | |

== Accolades ==
=== Awards and nominations ===
Award(s) and Nomination(s) received by Chang
| Award ceremony | Year | Category | Nominee / Work | Result | Ref. |
|---|---|---|---|---|---|
| 7th Cha Beom-seok Playwriting Award | 2013 | Musical Play Department | Those Days | Won | |
| DongA Theater Award | 2008 | Best Theater Play | Melodrama | Won | |
| 2nd Edaily Culture Awards | 2015 | Tomorrow's Artist Award | Those Days | Won | |
| 12th Korea Musical Awards | 2006 | Best Musical (Grand Prize) | Oh! While You Were Sleeping | Won | |
| 12th Korea Musical Awards | 2006 | Lyrics and Screenplay Awards | Oh! While You Were Sleeping | Won | |
| 12th Korea Musical Awards | 2006 | Best Musical | Finding Mister Destiny | Nominated | |
| 14th Korea Musical Awards | 2008 | Screenplay Awards | Chang You-jeong (Brothers Were Brave) | Won | |
| 19th Korea Musical Awards | 2013 | Best Original Musical | Those Days | Won | |
| 19th Korea Musical Awards | 2013 | Best Director | Those Days (Chang You-jeong) | Won | |
| 1st Musical Awards | 2007 | Lyricist and Composition Award | Finding Mister Destiny (Chang You-jeong) | Won | |
| 1st Musical Awards | 2007 | Best Musical | Finding Mister Destiny | Nominated | |
| 1st Musical Awards | 2007 | Best Re-performance | Oh! While You Were Sleeping | Nominated | |
| 3rd Musical Awards | 2008 | Lyricist and Composition Award | Brothers Were Brave (Chang You-jeong/Chang So-young) | Won | |
| 3rd Musical Awards | 2008 | Screenplay Awards | Brothers Were Brave (Chang You-jeong) | Won | |
| 7th Musical Awards | 2013 | Screenplay Awards | Those Days | Won | |
| 7th Musical Awards | 2013 | Best Original Musical | Those Days | Nominated | |
| 13th Pony Jung Innovation Award | 2019 | Innovation Award | Chang You-jeong | Won | |

=== State honors ===
State honour(s) received by Chang
| Country | Award Ceremony Or Organization | Year | Honor Or Award | Ref. |
|---|---|---|---|---|
| South Korea | Culture Day Award Ceremony | 2008 | Today's Young Artist Award (Note: Today's Young Artist Award was established in 1993. It hosted annually by Ministry of Culture, Sports and Tourism on Culture Day. The Ministry of Culture has selected promising young artists in their 20s and 30s by field and awarded the 'Today's Young Artist Award'. The winners receive a cash prize and a plaque from the Minister of Culture.); Popular Art Category | |

=== Listicles ===
listicle
| Publisher | Year | Listicle | Placement | Ref. |
|---|---|---|---|---|
| Seoul Economy Daily | 2010 | 50 people who will lead the future Culture, Sports, and Arts | Top 50 | |
