= Villains Everywhere =

2025 South Korean television series

- Promotional poster
- Hangul: 빌런의 나라
- RR: Billeonui nara
- MR: Pillŏnŭi nara
- Genre: Sitcom; Family drama
- Written by: Chae Woo; Park Kwang-yeon
- Directed by: Kim Young-jo; Choi Jung-eun
- Starring: Oh Na-ra; So Yoo-jin; Seo Hyun-chul; Song Jin-woo; Park Young-gyu
- Music by: Lee Chang-hee (CP)
- Country of origin: South Korea
- Original language: Korean
- No. of episodes: 12

Production
- Executive producers: Park Kiho (CP); Jo Il-hyung; Kim Jae-hoon; Jo Min-guk
- Producers: Yoon Joon-hee; Yoon Eun-seok; Hwang Bo-ram; Lim Young-jin; Choi In-su; Kim Seung-ha; Lee Won-geon
- Running time: 70 minutes
- Production company: Studio Plum

Original release
- Network: KBS2
- Release: March 19 – April 24, 2025

Villains Everywhere (Korean: 빌런의 나라) is a 2025 South Korean television series co-written by Chae Woo and Park Kwang-yeon, co-directed by Kim Young-jo and Choi Jung-eun, and starring Oh Na-ra, Soo Yoo-jin, Seo Hyun-chul, Song Jin-woo, and Park Young-gyu. It aired on KBS2 from March 19, to April 24, 2025, every Wednesday and Thursday at 21:50 (KST).

== Synopsis ==
The series revolves around the daily lives of two middle-aged sisters and their families.

== Cast and characters ==
=== Main ===
- Oh Na-ra as Oh Na-ra

A mother who lives for each day as if there is no tomorrow. She experiences a dazzling love story while traveling the world as a former flight attendant, but keeps her past a secret from her conservative, old-fashioned husband.

- So Yoo-jin as Oh Yoo-jin

Researcher in Korean cuisine.

- Park Young-gyu as Oh Young-gyu

Father of Oh Na-ra and Oh Yoo-jin. Once a brilliant sculptor in 1978, his career took a downward turn.

- Seo Hyun-chul as Seo Hyun-chul

Oh Na-ra's husband and the head of the planning team at a large company.

- Song Jin-woo as Song Jin-woo

Oh Yoo-jin's husband and the planning team manager at the same company as Hyun-chul.

=== Supporting ===
- Choi Ye-na as Goo Won-hee

She lives in Oh Na-ra's house. She is a second-year student at Narajo High School, beautiful, from a wealthy family, and a musical girl who plays the contrabass.

- Han Sung-min as Seo I-na

The daughter of Oh Na-ra and Seo Hyun-chul. Contrary to her simple and innocent appearance, she has a strong personality.

- Jeong Min-gyu as Seo Young-hoon

Son of Oh Na-ra and Seo Hyun-chul. He is in the same class as Goo Won-hee.

- Eunchan as Song Kang

The eldest son of Oh Yoo-jin and Song Jin-woo. He has the perfect balance of face, height, and brains.

- Jo Dan as Song Ba-da

The second son of Oh Yoo-jin and Song Jin-woo.

- Kim Deok-hyun as Kim Bu-jang
- Shin Shin-ae as Choi Kwang-ja
- Park Tam-hee as Kim Mi-ran
- Noh Min-woo as Cha Bin-yeok

== Ratings ==
Average TV viewership ratings (Nationwide)
Ep.	Original broadcast date	Average audience share (Nielsen Korea)
1	March 19, 2025	2.7% (20th)
2	March 20, 2025	2.2% (24th)
3	March 26, 2025	1.5% (29th)
4	March 27, 2025	2.3% (25th)
5	April 2, 2025	1.6% (30th)
6	April 3, 2025	1.3% (33rd)
7	April 9, 2025	1.5% (29th)
8	April 10, 2025	1.6% (31st)
9	April 16, 2025	1.3% (31st)
10	April 17, 2025	1.6% (32nd)
11	April 23, 2025	1.3% (31st)
12	April 24, 2025	1.4% (34th)
Average		1.7%
In the table above, the blue numbers represent the lowest ratings and the red numbers represent the highest ratings.
