= Lee Ji-ha =

South Korean actress (born 1970)

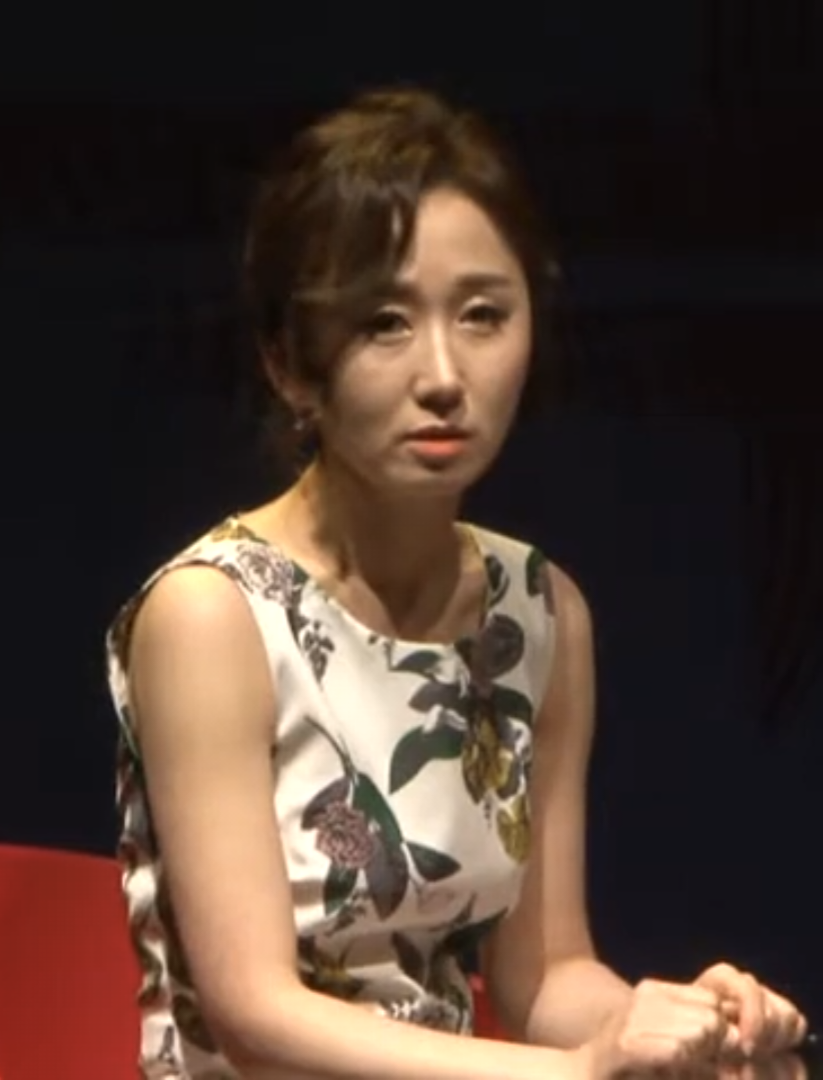
- Lee in May 2013
- Born: Lee Ji-ha; October 7, 1970 (age 56); South Korea
- Other name: Yi Ji-ha
- Education: Kyungsung University (Department of Theater)
- Occupation: Actress
- Years active: 2005–present
- Agent(s): S&A Entertainment
- Known for: The Smile Has Left Your Eyes; My Unfamiliar Family; Sweet Home; Squid Game

Lee Ji-ha (Korean: 이지하; born October 7, 1970) is a South Korean actress. She is known for her roles in dramas such as The Smile Has Left Your Eyes, My Unfamiliar Family, Sweet Home and Squid Game, the latter gaining her international fame. She also appeared in movies The Bros, The Handmaiden and Tabloid Truth.

== Filmography ==
=== Television series ===
Year	Title	Role	Ref.
2012	Drama Special Series: "Ordinary Love"	Sightseeing guide	
2013	The Queen of Office	Show host	
2016	Five Enough	Counselor	
2017	The Bride of Habaek	So-ah's mother	
2017	Hello, My Twenties!	Ho-chang's mother	
2017	Jugglers	Kang Soon-deok	
2017	Bad Guys 2	Kim Kyung-im	
2018	Welcome to Waikiki	Ji-soo's mother	
2018	Life on Mars	Han Mal-sook	
2018	KBS Drama Special: "Forgotten Season"	Park Jung-sook	
2018	The Smile Has Left Your Eyes	Nun Lucy	
2018	The Last Empress	Shin Eun-soo	
2019	Romance Is a Bonus Book	Hae-rin's mother	
2019	KBS Drama Special: "Goodbye B1"	Jang Seon-ja	
2019	Search: WWW	Park Morgan's mother	
2020	My Unfamiliar Family	Oh Mi-sook	
2020	Please Don't Date Him	Jung-han's mother	
2020	Hi Bye, Mama!	Park Hye-jin's mother	
2020	Sweet Home	Moon Hyeon-sook	
2021	Hospital Playlist 2	Gyung-jin's mother	
2021	KBS Drama Special: "F20"	Butler Byun	
2021	School 2021	Goo Mi-hee	
2021	Squid Game	Player 70	
2021	Happiness	Jo Ji-hee	
2022	The King of Pigs	Hwang Kyung-min's mother	
2022	KBS Drama Special: "Do You Know Ashtanga?"	Building owner	
2022	The Fabulous	Ye Seon-ho's mother	
2022	Eve	Chae Ri-sa	
2022	Poong, the Joseon Psychiatrist	Jo Dae-gam's wife	
2023	Dr. Romantic 3	Cha Eun-jae's mother	
2023	Strangers Again	Oh Ha-ra's mother	
2023	The First Responders 2	Gong Ju-soon	
2023	A Time Called You	Soo-kyung	
2024	Sweet Home (season 3)	Moon-hyeon-sook	
2025	No Mercy	Mi-yang	

=== Film ===
Year	Title	Role
2010	Finding Mr. Destiny	Customer
2012	Nameless Gangster: Rules of the Time	Bag Carrier
2012	Duresori: The Voice of East	Ah-reum's aunt
2014	Tabloid Truth	Nam Jung-in's wife
2016	The Handmaiden	Owner of Ryokan
2017	The Bros	Dang-sook's mother
2018	Love+Sling	Homeroom Teacher
2018	Herstory	Director
2020	Forgotten Love	Ji-ha
2021	New Year Blues	Jin-ah's manager
2022	Gyeong-Ah's Daughter	Mi-ja
2022	Decision to Leave	Apartment woman
2024	Lucky, Apartment	Shin Yeong-ran

== Awards and nominations ==
Name of the award ceremony, year presented, category, nominee of the award, and the result of the nomination
Award ceremony	Year	Category	Result	Ref.
Seoul Theater Festival	2005	Best New Actress	Won	
The 43rd Dong-A Theater Awards	2007	Best Actress	Won	
6th Yomiuri Theater Awards	2007	Best Actress	Won	
The 44th Dong-A Theater Awards	2008	New Actress Award	Won	
4th Golden Ticket Awards	2008	Best Actress Award	Won	
2nd Seoul Drama Awards Actor Awards	2015	Best Leading Actress	Won	
16th Yomiuri Theater Awards	2017	Best Actress Excellence Award	Won	
