= Oh Na-ra =

South Korean actress (born 1974)

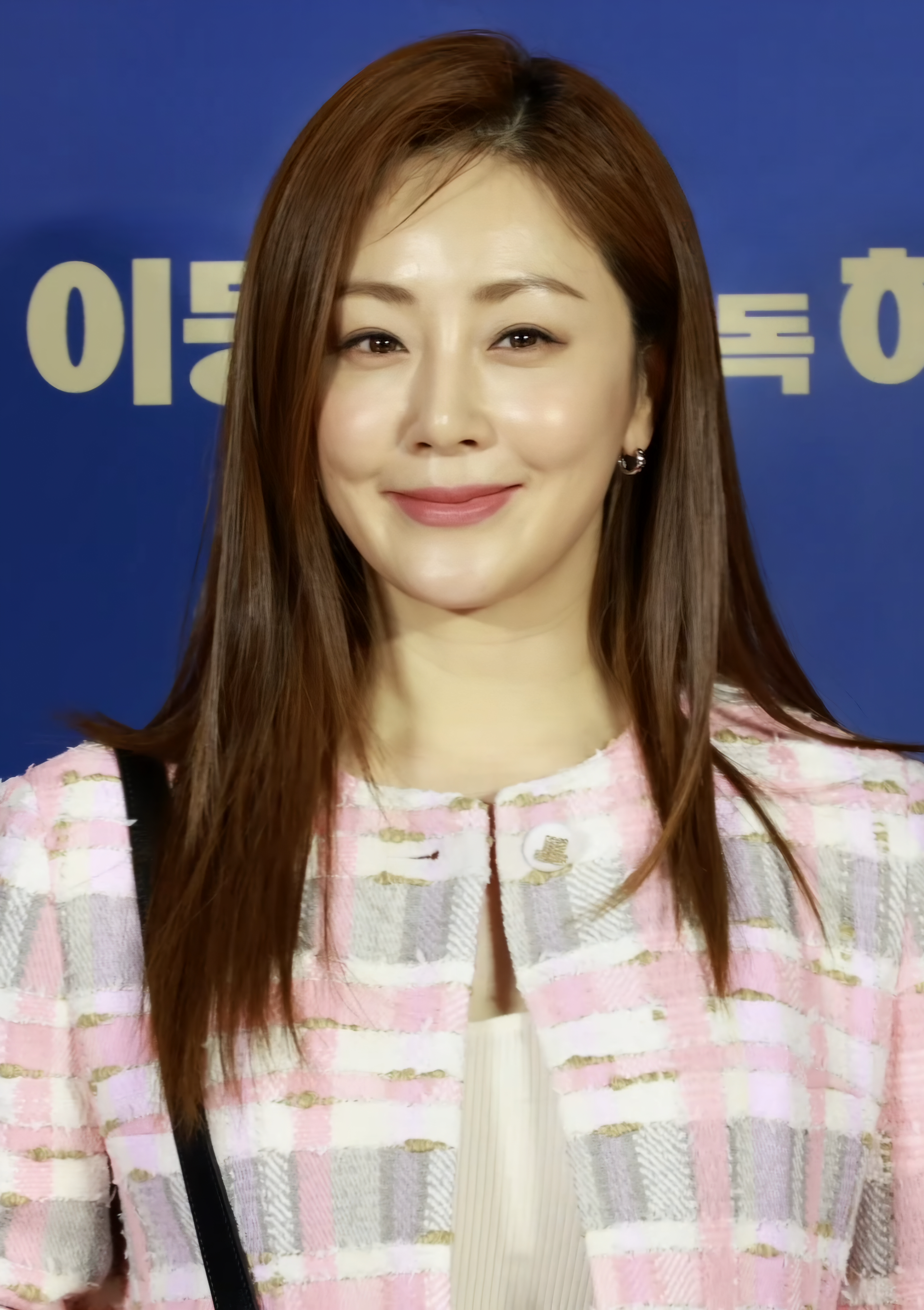
- Oh in April 2024
- Born: October 26, 1974 (age 52); Seoul, South Korea
- Occupation: Actress
- Years active: 1997–present
- Agent: Management A.M.9

Korean name
- Hangul: 오나라
- RR: O Nara
- MR: O Nara

Oh Na-ra (Korean: 오나라; born October 26, 1974) is a South Korean actress. She began her career by joining the Seoul Performing Arts Company in 1996 and made her debut in the musical Simcheong the following year. She went on to star in various productions such as Bari, Annie Quang, All That Jazz, Broadway 42nd Streets, Empress Myeongseong, Love in the Rain, and Mamma Mia. Since 2004, she started play the main lead in the creative musicals I Love You. Followed by Finding Kim Jong-wook, Singles, and Jomjom.

Throughout her career, as musical actress, has received several accolades, including the Best New Actress Award at the 2006 Daegu International Musical Festival, the Best Actress Award at the 12th Korea Musical Awards in 2006, the Female Popularity Award at the 1st The Musical Awards in 2007, and the Popular Star Award at the 13th Korea Musical Awards in 2007.

In addition to her work in musicals, Oh made her television debut with a minor role in SBS TV's My Sweet Seoul. She has since appeared in various dramas, including Pretty Mom, Pretty Woman, Queen of Reversals, Miss Ahjumma, Yong-pal, Hyde Jekyll, Me, Flowers of the Prison, Man to Man, The Lady in Dignity. Her supporting roles performances in dramas such as My Mister, Sky Castle, Racket Boys, and Alchemy of Souls earned her wider recognition.

== Early life and education ==
Oh Na-ra born on October 26, 1974, in Seoul as oldest of two siblings. Oh graduated from Kaywon Arts High School. Oh chose ballet as her major because she wanted to perform on stage. She graduated from the Department of Dance at Kyung Hee University. Afterwards, she pursued a master's degree in musical theater at Dankook University's Graduate School of Culture and Arts.

== Career ==
Oh grew interested in musicals after watching one on TV during college and wondered if they were real. She approached Nam Gyeong-eup, a musical actor, and expressed her desire to appear in musicals. Oh helped out at the performance hall of the musical "Love in the Rain," doing tasks like cleaning and selling tickets. She also tried to make the cast happy.

She joined the Seoul Performing Arts Company in 1996 and debuted with her musical "Simcheong" the following year. Afterwards, she appeared in "Bari," "Annie Quang," "All That Jazz," "Broadway 42nd Street," "Empress Myeongseong," "Love in the Rain" and "Mamma Mia."

In 2001, Oh joined the Japanese theater company "Four Seasons" despite being a newcomer in the musical world. Oh was first the Korean to be selected as a cast member. She auditioned and landed a role in the production "Contact." Although she couldn't speak Japanese, it was a dance-only production, so there were no major issues. However, she couldn't go on stage due to visa extension problems caused by the office staff's intentional actions. After eight months, Oh returned to Japan to appear in "Mamma Mia." Despite initially being cast as the main character, her Japanese skills weren't perfect, so she returned after two years as an ensemble member. It was a valuable experience, and she worked hard to prove herself and not let down Korean actors.

Oh returned to Korea in 2004, where she joined the premiere of the creative musical "I Love You," "Singles" and "Finding Kim Jong-wook." Oh appeared in "I Love You" more than 300 times and in Jang Yu-jeong's "Finding Kim Jong-wook" more than 100 times; she never took a break from performing.

Oh received many awards in 2006. She first won Best New Actress for "I Love You" at the Daegu International Musical Festival. Also, on the 10th anniversary of her debut, she won Best Actress for "Finding Kim Jong-wook" at the 2006 Korean Musical Awards.

In 2008, Oh made her television debut in a minor role in the SBS TV drama My Sweet Seoul. In 2009, Oh played the main character Maeng Shin-bi in the musical "Jeomjeom." It was created by Crocodile Company and performed at Chungmu Art Hall.

She has since appeared in dramas including Pretty Mom, Pretty Woman, Queen of Reversals, Miss Ahjumma, Yong-pal, Hyde Jekyll, Me, Flowers of the Prison, Man to Man and The Lady in Dignity. Explaining her transition to screen acting, Oh called it a natural progression driven by her long-standing desire to act. She said, "I entered screen acting after turning 30. Vocal cords are perishable, and female actors in musicals showcase their best abilities quickly. As I'm not a musical actress who competes based on singing skills, I began to feel my limitations. While I truly enjoy acting, I pondered how to sustain it over the long run. Screen acting naturally became an avenue for me."

Oh is also a former adjunct professor at the Department of Musical Arts of Baekseok University of Arts.

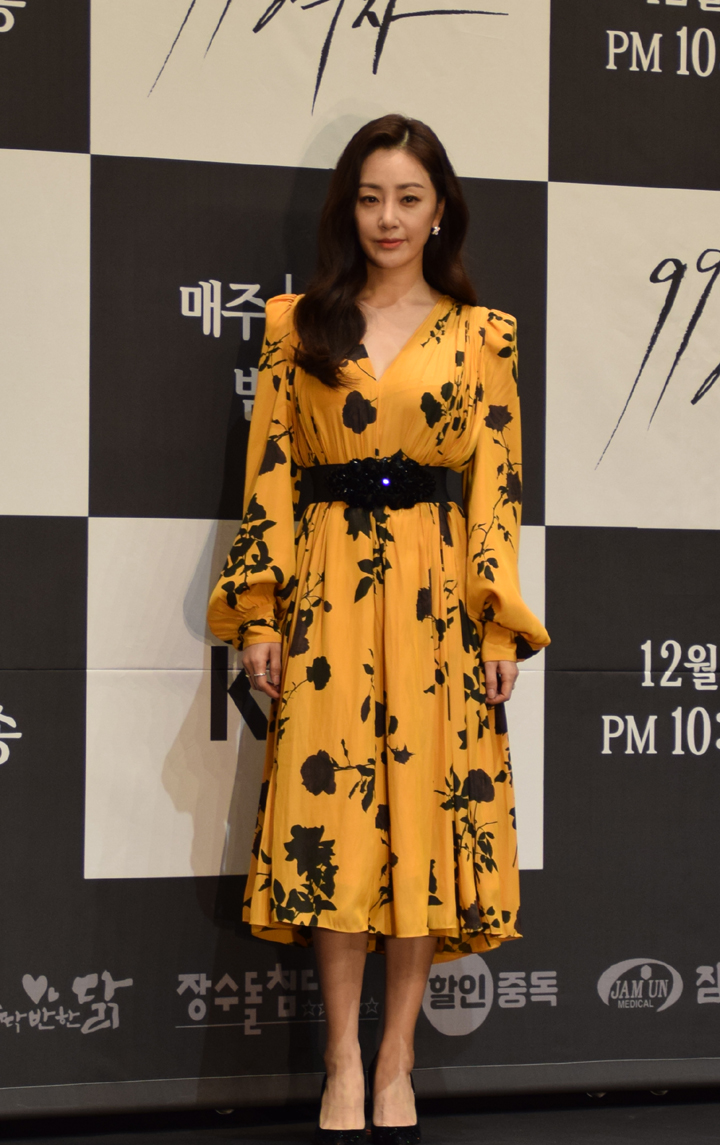
Oh at Woman of 9.9 Billion press conference in 2019

Oh gained popularity and recognition for her distinctive performances in hit dramas such as Woman of 9.9 Billion, which aired in 2017, tvN's My Mister (2018) and JTBC's Sky Castle (2018–19) following nearly ten years of acting on screen. Even after the conclusion of these dramas, public interest in Oh continued to grow. Oh Na-ra's supporting roles in the internationally aired Netflix dramas Racket Boys and Alchemy of Souls garnered her broader recognition.

Oh appeared in Perhaps Love, a comedy-drama directed by Jo Eun-ji for Next Entertainment. The film revolves around a best-selling writer named Hyeon (Ryu Seung-ryong) in a slump for seven years. He works with his best friend Soon-mo (Kim Hee-won), the head of Sunmo Publishing Co. Hyeon meets aspiring author Yoo-jin (Mu Jin-sung), who changes his values. Oh played Mi-ae, Hyeon's ex-wife. It was released theatrically on November 17, 2021. In the box office as of December 16, 2021, it ranked 10th among domestic films released in 2021 in South Korea, with a gross of US$4.36 million from 514,260 tickets sold.

== Personal life ==
Oh Na-ra's family circumstances, which included her younger brother's mental disability and her father's business failure, had a significant impact on shaping her into a dedicated and hardworking actress.

Oh has been in a long-term relationship with her partner, Kim Do-hoon, since her 20s. They entered a relationship in 2000 through the musical Empress Myeongseong. Kim played a Japanese ronin and Oh a court lady. Kim, a former actor, teaches acting at a model academy and manages the wine bar West End in Seoul's Cheongdam-dong neighborhood.

== Filmography ==
=== Film ===
Film acting performances
Year	Title	Role	Notes	Ref.
2010	Finding Mr. Destiny	Hyo-jeong	Cameo	
2011	The Last Blosom	Bar owner	Cameo	
2012	Dancing Queen	Ra-ri		
2012	The Grand Heist	Hye-jeong		
2012	The Spies	Eun-hye		
2013	Marriage Blue	Seon-ok		
2015	Casa Amor: Exclusive for Ladies (also known as Working Girl)	Wife of Soo-beom		
2017	Misbehavior	Lesson teacher	Cameo	
2017	Because I Love You	Wife of Park Chan-il		
2021	Perhaps Love	Mi-ae		
2022	Men of Plastic	Oh Mi-jung		
2023	Count	Il-seon		

=== Television series ===
Year	Title	Role	Notes	Ref.
2008	My Sweet Seoul	Senior Jang		
2010	Pretty Mom, Pretty Woman	Oh Jung-hee		
2010–2011	Queen of Reversals	Bong Hae-keum		
2011	Miss Ajumma	Kim Hyun-sook		
2012	Feast of the Gods	Oh Soo-jin		
2013	King of Ambition	Section Chief Yeom		
2013	MBC Drama Festival		Episode: The Marvelous Sunshine Funeral Home For The Elderly	
2013–2014	A Little Love Never Hurts	Kim Ji-young		
2014	KBS Drama Special	Hye-jeong	Episode: "The Reason I'm Getting Married"	
2014	Steal Heart	Park Yang-soon		
2015	Hyde Jekyll, Me	Cha Jin-joo		
2015	Yong-pal	Charge nurse, intensive care		
2015–2016	Remember	Prosecutor Chae Jin-kyung		
2016	Come Back Mister	Secretary Wang / X (unidentified spy)		
2016	Flowers of the Prison	Hwang Gyo-ha, head of kisaeng room Sosolu		
2017	Chicago Typewriter	Secretary Kang		
2017	Man to Man	Sharon Kim		
2017	The Happy Loner	Jung Soo-kyung		
2017	The Lady in Dignity	Ahn Jae-hee		
2017	Super Family 2017	Ra-yeon's friend	Cameo	
2017	KBS Drama Special	Jae-hee	Episode: "Buzz Cut's Date" (Cameo)	
2017	Drama Stage	Kim Tae-hee	Episode: "Chief B and the Love Letter"	
2017–2018	Judge vs. Judge	Judge Yoon		
2018	My Mister	Jung-hee		
2018–2019	Sky Castle	Jin Jin-hee		
2019	Welcome to Waikiki 2	Lender's wife	Cameo	
2019–2020	Woman of 9.9 Billion	Yoon Hee-joo		
2020	Chip In	Ji-hye		
2021	Racket Boys	Ra Yeong-ja		
2022–2023	Alchemy of Souls	Maidservant Kim	Part 1–2	
2022	Behind Every Star	Herself	Cameo (Ep. 5)	
2023	Strong Girl Nam-soon	Yoon-hee	Cameo (Ep. 16)	
2024	The Judge from Hell	Justitia	Special appearance	
2025	Villains Everywhere	Herself		
2025	Confidence Queen	Gil Mi-in	Cameo (ep. 7–8)	

=== Television shows ===
Year	Title	Role	Notes	Ref.
2006–2011	KBS TV Kindergarten Panipani'	Cast member		
2020–2022	Sixth Sense	Cast member	Season 1–3	
2023	Anbang Judge	Lawyer		
2024	Apartment 404	Cast member		

=== Web show ===
Year	Title	Role	Notes	Ref.
2022	Saturday Night Live Korea	Host	Episode 14 – Season 2	

== Stage ==
=== Concert ===
Concert performances
Year	Title		Role	Theater	Date	Ref.
Year	English	Korean	Role	Theater	Date	Ref.
2009	All about the Musical			COEX Artium	April 13 to 30	
2009	KBS Symphony Orchestra 128th Children's Concert	KBS교향악단 제128회 어린이음악회	Singer	KBS Hall	August 22, 2009	
2013	Seoul Musical Festival Closing Gala Show	2013 서울뮤지컬페스티벌 폐막갈라쇼	Singer	Chungmu Art Center Grand Theater	August 12, 2013	

=== Musical ===
Musical play performances
Year	Title		Role	Theater	Date	Ref.
Year	English	Korean	Role	Theater	Date	Ref.
1997	Simcheong	심청	ensemble	Seoul Arts Center Opera Theater	March 19 to 23	
1997	Kim Sa-gat	김삿갓	ensemble	Seoul Arts Center; Chonbuk National University Samsung Cultural Center; Pohang Culture and Arts Center; Gumi Culture and Arts Center; Hyoja Music Hall; Samcheok Culture and Arts Center	October 28 to December 6	
1998	Annie	애니깽	ensemble	Seoul Arts Center Opera Theater	June 2 to 7	
1999	Bari	바리 - 잊혀진 자장가	ensemble	Seoul Arts Center Opera Theater	January 9 to 24	
1999	Broadway 42nd Street	브로드웨이 42번가	ensemble	Hoam Art Hall	December 17 to 31	
1999	Fame	페임	ensemble	Hoam Art Hall	September 18 to October5	
2000	Empress Myeongseong	명성황후	court lady/shaman	Seoul Arts Centre Opera Theatre	February 25 to March 12	
2000	Fame	페임	ensemble	LG Art Centre	September 29 to October 15	
2000	All that Jazz	올댓재즈	ensemble	LG Art Centre	November 22 to December 6	
2000–2001	Empress Myeongseong	명성황후	court lady/shaman	Seoul Arts Centre Opera Theatre	December 29 to January 18	
2001	Love is in the rain	사랑은 비를 타고	Mi-ri	OD Musical Company Information Theater	April 6 to October 7	
2003	Mamma Mia	맘마미아	Dancer	Japan		
2004	I Love You	아이 러브 유	Female 1	Dusan Art Center Yeonkang Hall	November 30, 2004 – June 26, 2005	
2005	I Love You	아이 러브 유	Female 1	Dusan Art Center Yeonkang Hall	October 29, 2005 – May 7, 2006	
2006	Finding Mr. Destiny	김종욱 찾기	Woman Finding Her 1st Love	JTN Art Hall 1	June 2, 2006 – August 15, 2006	
2006–2007	Finding Mr. Destiny	김종욱 찾기	Woman Finding Her 1st Love	JTN Art Hall 1	December 12, 2006 – April 8, 2007	
2007	Singles	싱글즈	Nanan	Dongsoong Art Center Dongsoong Hall	June 9, 2007 – September 9, 2007	
2007–2008	Finding Mr. Destiny Season 3	김종욱 찾기 3	Woman Finding Her 1st Love	JTN Art Hall 1 (Daehakro Arts Plaza Hall 1)	October 23–February 17	
2008	Finding Mr. Destiny Season 3	김종욱 찾기 3	Woman Finding Her 1st Love	JTN Art Hall 1 (Daehakro Arts Plaza Hall 1)	September 5	
2008	Singles	싱글즈	Nanan	Baekam Art Hall	October 25, 2008 – January 18, 2009	
2009–2011	Finding Mr. Destiny	김종욱 찾기	Woman	JTN Art Hall 1	March 2009–May 2011	
2009	Singles	싱글즈	Nanan	Daehakro Freedom Theater	June 30, 2009 – August 16, 2009	
2009	Little by Little	점점	Maeng Shin-bi	Chungmu Art Center Black Box Theater	November 25, 2009 – February 7, 2010	

== Awards and nominations ==
Name of the award ceremony, year presented, category, nominee of the award, and the result of the nomination
Award ceremony	Year	Category	Nominee / Work	Result	Ref.
APAN Star Awards	2025	Excellence Acting Award, Actress	Villains Everywhere, The Nice Guy	Won	
Asia Model Awards	2019	Fashionista Award	Oh Na-ra	Won	
Baeksang Arts Awards	2012	Best New Actress – Film	Dancing Queen	Nominated	
Baeksang Arts Awards	2012	Most Popular Actress – Film	Dancing Queen	Nominated	
Baeksang Arts Awards	2019	Best Supporting Actress – Television	My Mister	Nominated	
Baeksang Arts Awards	2022	Best Supporting Actress – Film	Perhaps Love	Nominated	
Blue Dragon Film Awards	2022	Best Supporting Actress	Perhaps Love	Won	
Chunsa Film Art Awards	2022	Best Supporting Actress	Perhaps Love	Won	
Grand Bell Awards	2022	Best Supporting Actress	Perhaps Love	Nominated	
Grand Bell Awards	2022	People's Choice Award	Perhaps Love	Won	
Korean Culture Entertainment Awards	2017	Excellence Award (Actress) (Movie)	Because I Love You	Won	
Korean Culture Entertainment Awards	2021	Top Excellence Award, Actress	Racket Boys	Won	
Korea Musical Awards	2006	Best Actress	Finding Mr. Destiny	Won	
Korea Musical Awards	2007	Popularity Award	Oh Na-ra	Won	
MBC Drama Awards	2020	Top Excellence Award, Actress in a Monday-Tuesday Miniseries / Short Drama	Chip In	Nominated	
The Musical Awards	2007	Popularity Award (Actress)	Oh Na-ra	Won	
SBS Drama Awards	2021	Excellence Award for an Actress in a Mini-Series Genre / Fantasy Drama	Racket Boys	Nominated	
SBS Drama Awards	2021	Best Character Award, Actress	Racket Boys	Won	
Scene Stealer Festival	2023	Bonsang "Main Prize"	Alchemy of Souls	Won	
