= EXR (clothing) =

South Korean clothing designer and retailer

EXR Korea Co., LTD.
- Type: Casual Sportswear
- Industry: Fashion; Sportswear
- Founded: August 8, 2001
- Headquarters: Seoul, South Korea
- Products: Apparel, Shoes, Accessories
- Parent: SungWoo Hightech
- Website: www.exrkorea.com
- Footnotes; Converse/KAPPA Korean Licensee

EXR KOREA Co., Ltd. (hangul:이엑스알 코리아) is a clothing designer and retailer, based in South Korea. EXR was founded as a subsidiary of SungWoo Hightech in 2001. Due to the product positioning in the niche market of sportswear industry, EXR has become one of the premium clothing brands in Korean fashion market just after 3 years of the launching. With its Concepts of Caports (Character Sports Casual), EXR's sales revenue in 2013 is expected to amount to $140 million.

== Corporate history ==
- Aug 2001, EXR Korea established
- Jan 2002, EXR shop #1 opened at Galleria Department Store (Seoul)
- February 2002, Introduced the first fingerprint-recognition-based customer management system in Korea
- September 2002, Officially sponsored the 1st Korean Supermodel Contest
- September 2003, Officially sponsored the 2nd Korean Supermodel Contest
- Aug 2003, EXR shop #100 opened
- October 2003, Head office relocated (481-5, Bangbae-3-dong, Seocho-gu)
- December 2003, Received ‘the Market Leading Brand in 2004’ award and ‘the Best Brand’ award from top tier press (Fashion Insight. Apparel News, Texherald, the Korea Economic Daily)
- February 2004, Built the EXR distribution center (Yangji-myeon, Yongin, Gyeonggi-do)
- February 2004, Received the ‘Best Brand’ Award from Debec Plaza (First among the 180 brand shops in the department store)
- Aug 2004, EXR shop #1 opened in China (at Nextage Dept, Shanghai China)
- Dec 2004, Received the‘2004 Best Brand’Award from Korea Fashion Associates
- Apr 2005, Established EXR Japan, a joint venture, in Japan
- Aug 2005, EXR shop #1 opened at Nagoya in Japan
- Aug 2006, EXR Indonesia established and shop #1 opened
