= O Candidato Honesto =

- Directed by: Roberto Santucci
- Screenplay by: Paulo Cursino
- Produced by: André Carreira; Paulo Cursino
- Starring: Leandro Hassum; Flávia Garrafa; Luiza Valdetaro; Victor Leal; Flávio Galvão
- Cinematography: Nonato Estrela
- Production companies: RioFilme; Globo Filmes; Camisa Listrada; Panorama Filmes; Paramount Pictures; Telecine Productions
- Distributed by: Paris Filmes; Downtown Filmes
- Release date: 2 October 2014
- Running time: 106 minutes
- Country: Brazil
- Language: Portuguese

O Candidato Honesto is a 2014 Brazilian comedy film directed by Roberto Santucci with screenplay written by Paulo Cursino. Inspired by Tom Shadyac's Liar Liar, the film revolves around a candidate for the presidency of Brazil, played by Leandro Hassum—a charismatic yet corrupt politician who, on the eve of the presidential election, receives a spell from his dying grandmother that renders him unable to lie. The film was released on October 2, 2014, amid the context of that year's elections. A sequel to the film, O Candidato Honesto 2, was released in 2018.

== Plot ==
João Ernesto Ribamar commenced his political career as president of the Bus Drivers' Union. Now a highly popular congressman, he ultimately becomes a candidate for the Presidency of the Republic. A confirmed corrupt politician, João is at the zenith of his career, on the verge of electoral victory, when his grandmother casts a powerful spell upon him. On her deathbed, Dona Justina vehemently decries her grandson's dishonesty, and by the following day, complete disarray ensues. On the eve of the second round and leading in the opinion polls, he finds himself unable to utter a single falsehood or partake in any illicit activity. As he becomes increasingly embroiled in a series of predicaments, he sets off on an inescapable path that will ultimately transform his trajectory.

== Cast ==
- Leandro Hassum as João Ernesto Ribamar
- Flávia Garrafa as Isabel Ribamar
- Victor Leal as Marcelinho
- Luiza Valdetaro as Amanda Pinheiro
- Flávio Galvão as Montanaro
- Henri Pagnoncelli as Nelson
- Antônio Pedro as Demétrio
- Luis Lobianco as Mateus Floriano
- Nilton Bicudo as Antônio "Tio Tonho" Praxedes da Silva
- Prazeres Barbosa as Dona Justina Ribamar
- Murilo Grossi as Flávio Botelho
- Ellen Rocche as Carmem
- Jovane Nunes as Paizim do Bode
- Marcius Melhem as Deputy João Contrário da Silva
- Charles Myara as Deputy Washington Barroso
- Júlia Rabello as Maria Lúcia Brito, a parody of Ana Maria Braga
- Antônio Fragoso as Wallace, the debate moderator
- Arthur Claro as Joãozinho Ribamar
- Giovanna Estefanio as Sofia Ribamar
- Cláudio Torres Gonzaga as the President of the Chamber of Deputies
- Aramis Trindade as congressman
- Cláudio Cinti as aide
- Iran Meu Nêgo as head of security
- Bernardo Felinto as reporter
- Dandara Mariana as reporter
- Marcello Caridade as João's lawyer

== Reception ==
Ritter Fan, from the website Plano Crítico, said that O Candidato Honesto is "exactly what one would expect: a shallow film, with some exaggerated 'performances' and a screenplay that brings together everything we've already seen in a heterogeneous mixture". He states that the plot is "practically copied from Liar Liar", starring Jim Carrey, and that the jokes are "as clichéd as possible", while also pointing out "gags of a prejudiced nature". The critic also criticizes the "forced relationship" between the protagonists, who "have absolutely no chemistry", and the "unsteady editing", which fails to interweave the different perspectives of the story. In his view, the film has a few merits, such as cinematography that "escapes the exhausting sameness", but nothing that compensates for the "endless blunders of the work". Finally, he concludes that, despite all its flaws, the feature "will still be a major box-office success".

David Arrais, from the website Cinema com Rapadura, said that the film is a satire of the Brazilian electoral system with a premise "clearly copied from Liar Liar". He praises the "parodies of famous corruption cases" and the supporting cast, but criticizes Leandro Hassum's forced imitation of Jim Carrey, stating that "the feeling that permeates much of the screening is one of secondhand embarrassment". Arrais also points out the typical flaws of Brazilian comedies, such as "shallow and childish moral lessons", "an unlikely romance", "an abundance of profanity", and insertions that add nothing to the plot, concluding with the question: "Will this worn-out formula ever stop being a hit at Brazilian box offices?"
