= Baeksang Arts Award for Best Technical Achievement – Television =

South Korean annual television award

- Awarded for: Best technical achievement in a South Korean series
- Country: South Korea
- Presented by: Baeksang Arts Awards
- Website: https://www.baeksangawards.co.kr/

The Baeksang Arts Award for Best Technical Achievement – Television (Korean: 백상예술대상 TV부문 예술상; RR: Baeksang Yesul Daesang TV Bumun Yesulsang) is annually presented at the Baeksang Arts Awards ceremony. The Baeksang Arts Awards ceremony is one of South Korea's most prestigious award shows, recognizing excellence in film, television, and theatre.

== Winners and nominees ==
Table key
‡	Indicates the winner

Year	Winner and nominees	Television series	Specification	Network
2019 (55th)	Park Sung-jin ‡	Memories of the Alhambra	Visual effects	tvN
2019 (55th)	Kim So-yeon	Mr. Sunshine	Production design	tvN
2019 (55th)	Kim Yong, Jeon Joon Woo	May, The Origins of Civilization	Cinematography	EBS
2019 (55th)	Oh Jae Ho	Sky Castle	Cinematography	JTBC
2019 (55th)	Lee Yong-seob	Mr. Sunshine	Visual effects	tvN
2020 (56th)	Jang Yeon-wook ‡	Great Escape 3	Production design	tvN
2020 (56th)	Kim Nam-sik, Ryu Gun-hee	Kingdom	Visual effects	Netflix
2020 (56th)	Kim Ji-soo	Pegasus Market	Production design	tvN
2020 (56th)	Park Sung-il	Itaewon Class	Music direction	JTBC
2020 (56th)	Park Si-yeon	You Quiz on the Block	Cinematography	tvN
2021 (57th)	Cho Sang-kyung ‡	It's Okay to Not Be Okay	Costume design	tvN
2021 (57th)	Lee Byung-joo	Sweet Home	Visual effects	Netflix
2021 (57th)	Jang Jong-kyung	Beyond Evil	Cinematography	JTBC
2021 (57th)	Choi Jung-yoon	The Stage of Legends: Archive K	Music direction	SBS
2021 (57th)	MBC Design Center VFX Team	VR Documentary Meeting People season 2	Virtual reality	MBC
2022 (58th)	Jung Jae-il ‡	Squid Game	Music direction	Netflix
2022 (58th)	Kwon Tae-eun	King of Mask Singer	Music direction	MBC
2022 (58th)	Kim Hwa-young	The Red Sleeve	Cinematography	MBC
2022 (58th)	Eom Young-shik, Kim Da-hee	Yumi's Cells	Animation	tvN
2022 (58th)	Chae Kyung-sun	Squid Game	Production design	Netflix
2023 (59th)	Ryu Seong-hui ‡	Little Women	Production design	tvN
2023 (59th)	Noh Young-sim	Extraordinary Attorney Woo	Music direction	ENA
2023 (59th)	Song Nak-hoon, Jo Jin-hyeon, Hwang In-woo	Inkigayo	Cinematography	SBS
2023 (59th)	Hwang Jin-hye	Extraordinary Attorney Woo	Visual effects	ENA
2023 (59th)	Jang Jong-kyung	The Glory	Cinematography	Netflix
2024 (60th)	Kim Dong-shik, Im Wan-ho	Whales and I	Cinematography	SBS
2024 (60th)	Yang Ho-sam, Park Ji-won	Revenant	Production design	SBS
2024 (60th)	Lee Seok-geun	Korea–Khitan War	Costume design	KBS
2024 (60th)	Lee Sung-kyu	Moving	Virtual effects	Disney+
2024 (60th)	Ha Ji-hee	The Matchmakers	Production design	KBS
