= Good Boy (TV series) =

2025 South Korean television series

- Promotional poster
- Hangul: 굿보이
- RR: Gutboi
- MR: Kutpoi
- Genre: Action comedy; Crime; Romance
- Written by: Lee Dae-il
- Directed by: Shim Na-yeon
- Starring: Park Bo-gum; Kim So-hyun; Oh Jung-se; Lee Sang-yi; Heo Sung-tae; Tae Won-seok
- Music by: Heo Sung-jin
- Country of origin: South Korea
- Original language: Korean
- No. of episodes: 16

Production
- Running time: 70 minutes
- Production companies: SLL; Studio&NEW; Drama House Studio

Original release
- Network: JTBC
- Release: May 31 – July 20, 2025

Good Boy (Korean: 굿보이) is a 2025 South Korean action comedy television series written by Lee Dae-il, directed by Shim Na-yeon, and starring Park Bo-gum, Kim So-hyun, Oh Jung-se, Lee Sang-yi, Heo Sung-tae, and Tae Won-seok. It centers around former sports heroes who become police officers. The series had its world premiere in Bangkok, Thailand attended by Park, Kim, and Lee on May 31, 2025. It aired on JTBC on the same day and aired every Saturday and Sunday at 22:40 (KST). It is also available for streaming on several platforms including Netflix and Disney+ in South Korea, and Amazon Prime Video globally.

The series received positive reviews from critics with particular praise for its stylish direction, blockbuster-level production, original soundtrack, and Park's compelling performance as an action hero.

== Synopsis ==
Faced with financial struggles, short career spans, injuries, and other challenges, former elite athletes become special police officers and form a rag-tag team to fight violent crime – using their unique skills acquired during their time as athletes.

== Cast and characters ==
=== Main ===
- Park Bo-gum as Yoon Dong-ju

"Named after the noble Korean poet, Dong-ju lives a life contrary to the name given to him, always getting involved in fist fights during his school years. Through his experiences in fighting, Dong-ju learns proper boxing, beginning a successful career as a boxer and ultimately becoming an international gold medalist. Unfortunately, Dong-ju's glorious moment is shattered by his unfair expulsion from his boxing team. A new beginning starts for Dong-ju when he is able to become a police officer through a special recruitment opportunity."

- Kim So-hyun as Ji Han-na

"Since middle school, Han-na was a shooting prodigy, dominating world championships with her precise aim and was adored by many fans. Criticism poured in and misunderstandings piled up, causing Han-na to gradually shut herself off from the world. These difficulties led to her failing to concentrate at the most crucial moment in her shooting career, forcing her to retire. She then applied for special police recruitment, with dreams of becoming a police officer like her father."

- Oh Jung-se as Min Ju-yeong

A 7th-grade civil servant at the Korea Customs Service who received a commendation from the commissioner for his diligence and sincerity but hides a great desire behind his good-natured smile

- Lee Sang-yi as Kim Jong-hyeon

"Formerly a silver medalist fencer, Jong-hyeon worked hard to graduate from the police academy due to his desire to reunite with his former girlfriend, Han-na"

- Heo Sung-tae as Ko Man-sik

A former bronze medalist in wrestling turned team leader, "his training as an athlete turned into valuable skills as a police officer"

- Tae Won-seok as Shin Jae-hong

A gentle giant, "his initial reluctance to join the special police team as a bronze medalist in discus throwing becomes a shining asset"

=== Supporting ===
==== Police department and prosecutor’s office ====
- Kim Eung-soo as Jo Pan-Yeol, the police commissioner
- Seo Hyun-chul as Hwang Gyeong-cheol, chief of the police department who is close to Man-sik
- Kim Seo-kyung as Kim Seok-Hyeon, a prosecutor and Jong-hyeon's older brother
- Park Chul-min as Kim Geum-nam, police informant and pawnshop owner
- Han Kyu-won as An Dae-yong, team leader of Regional Investigation Unit (RIU)

==== Cartels and gangs ====
- Lee Ho-jung as Kim Yeon-ha, also known as Drug Monster
- Go Jun as Leo, a Korean-Russian mafia boss
- Ahn Se-ho as Baek Seok-chun
- Jung Man-sik as Oh Jong-gu, a former national boxing coach and head of J9 Security
- Kang Gil-woo as Lee Sang-gon, head of Golden Bunny gang, a criminal organization that dominates Insung City
- Yoo In-soo as Bagboy

==== People around the Special Criminal Investigation Team ====
- Seo Jeong-yeon as Jeong Mi-ja, owner of Gyeongil Noodles
- Seo Jae-hee as Jin Gyeong-sook, Han-na's mother who is an insurance saleswoman
- Choi Myung-bin as Ko Jung-a, Man-sik's daughter

=== Special appearances ===
- Lee Jung-ha as Lee Kyung-il, former boxer
- Choi Woo-jin as the police department's physician
- Lee Ji-hoon as Lee Hoon, a physician

== Episodes ==
No. in series	Title	Directed by	Written by	Original release date
1	"Our Twisted Hero"; Transliteration: "Urideurui ilgeureojin yeongung" (Korean: 우리들의 일그러진 영웅)	Shim Na-yeon	Lee Dae-il	May 31, 2025
Following his troublemaking, Dong-ju is reassigned to the Insung Metropolitan Police Agency, where he is regarded as a burden, and his fellow elite medalists also encounter prejudice and disdain. However, when a significant case arises, it rekindles their passion and determination.
2	"Faster, Further, Stronger"; Transliteration: "Deo ppalli deo nopi deo ganghage" (Korean: 더 빨리 더 높이 더 강하게)	Shim Na-yeon	Lee Dae-il	June 1, 2025
Following Man-sik's recommendation, a special criminal investigation unit is established with former world-class medalists. Prepared for a new beginning, every member comes on board with their individual aspirations and objectives, yet a concealed motive lies beneath the formation of this specialized team.
3	"Million Dollar Baby"; Transliteration: "Millieondalleo beibi" (Korean: 밀리언달러 베이비)	Shim Na-yeon	Lee Dae-il	June 7, 2025
Believing that Ju-yeong is the driver involved in the hit-and-run, Dong-ju rushes to gather proof. In the meantime, Jong-hyeon goes to the Prosecutors Office at Man-sik's urging to look into Gyeong-il's case, while Ju-yeong encounters someone in the shadows.
4	"Float Like a Butterfly"; Transliteration: "Nabicheoreom naraseo" (Korean: 나비처럼 날아서)	Shim Na-yeon	Lee Dae-il	June 8, 2025
The Special Criminal Investigation Team is now fully assembled with Han-na's rejoining and Jong-hyeon coming aboard. They initiate an extensive probe into Gyeong-il's demise and Min Ju-yeong. As they separate into groups and get closer to their objectives, Han-na receives the case files from her father.
5	"Punch-Drunk Love"; Transliteration: "Peonchi deureongkeu reobeu" (Korean: 펀치 드렁크 러브)	Shim Na-yeon	Lee Dae-il	June 14, 2025
The Special Criminal Investigation Team's abrupt interference during their investigation of Ju-yeong forces them to turn him over to the prosecution. After his vehicle accident, Dong-ju is taken to the hospital for examinations, and the team investigates Ju-yeong's real identity and his ties to the prosecution.
6	"Counterpunch"; Transliteration: "Kaunteo peonchi" (Korean: 카운터 펀치)	Shim Na-yeon	Lee Dae-il	June 15, 2025
Dong-ju finds Ju-yeong's burner phone while out on an inquiry with Han-na alone, using the surprise kiss as a pretext. The closer Dong-ju and Han-na become, the more anxious Jong-hyeon becomes. Drugmon, who is being watched at an apartment, starts making plans to get out in the meantime.
7	"Par terre Par terre" Transliteration: "Patereu patereu" (Korean: 파테르 파테르)	Shim Na-yeon	Lee Dae-il	June 21, 2025
Dong-ju's assault puts the Special Criminal Investigation Team in a major crisis. Man-sik fights to keep the team together, while the others continue investigating Ju-yeong, weighed down by uncertainty. Meanwhile, Ju-yeong leaves the hospital and heads to an unknown destination.
8	"The Aimless Bullet"; Transliteration: "Obaltan" (Korean: 오발탄)	Shim Na-yeon	Lee Dae-il	June 22, 2025
The Special Criminal Investigation Team learns about Ju-yeong's drug trafficking and disguises themselves as a quarantine unit to infiltrate the customs office. Acting on a tip from Drugmon, they successfully locate the container concealing the drugs but fall directly into a trap laid by Ju-yeong.
9	"Allez" (Korean: 알레)	Shim Na-yeon	Lee Dae-il	June 28, 2025
Dong-ju and Jong-hyeon race to save Han-na after she is abducted, only to become entangled in a fatal situation. A sudden gunshot is heard just when it looks like there is no way out. Will the squad survive after being shaken by an unexpected sacrifice?
10	"Time-out" (Korean: 타임 아웃)	Shim Na-yeon	Lee Dae-il	June 29, 2025
The Special Criminal Investigation Team is dissolved. Dong-ju stealthily plots retaliation against Ju-yeong alone, but his careless action only serves to spark a bigger issue. Ju-yeong counterattacks after realizing his scheme.
11	"Countdown" (Korean: 카운트다운)	Shim Na-yeon	Lee Dae-il	July 5, 2025
After their reunion, the Special Criminal Investigation Team discovers Ju-yeong's enormous secret. Ju-yeong becomes agitated with Dong-ju's suggestive countdown and acts frantically.
12	"Foul" (Korean: 파울)	Shim Na-yeon	Lee Dae-il	July 6, 2025
Dong-ju had his worst dilemma to date after falling into Ju-yeong's trap and suffering a serious injury.
13	"Load, Start... Don't Stop"	Shim Na-yeon	Lee Dae-il	July 12, 2025
Dong-ju and the group begin their last full-scale assault on Ju-yeong since there is no more option to escape. They immediately encounter strong counterattacks and unforeseen barriers as they charge ahead without hesitation.
14	"Kings Never Die"	Shim Na-yeon	Lee Dae-il	July 13, 2025
As they prepare for their final confrontation with Ju-yeong, Dong-ju and the team strive valiantly to prevail. Two guys who are determined to fight to the end are engaged in a fateful conflict.
15	"On the Ropes"	Shim Na-yeon	Lee Dae-il	July 19, 2025
A full-scale operation against Ju-yeong's cartel is initiated by the whole Insung Police Force. However, Ju-yeong's most deadly counterattack sends the city into complete disorder just as victory is about to be achieved.
16	"We Are the Champions"	Shim Na-yeon	Lee Dae-il	July 20, 2025
In the middle of the confusion, Dong-ju and the group start their last conflict to decide the future of Insung City.

== Production ==
=== Development ===
In February 2021, Good Boy was announced as part of Studio&NEW's drama lineup with a script written by Lee Dae-il who wrote Life on Mars (2018) and Chief of Staff (2019). SLL, Studio&NEW, and Drama House Studio managed the production. In 2023, Shim Na-yeon, who directed Beyond Evil (2021) and The Good Bad Mother (2023), was attached to direct the series.

=== Casting ===
Principal cast

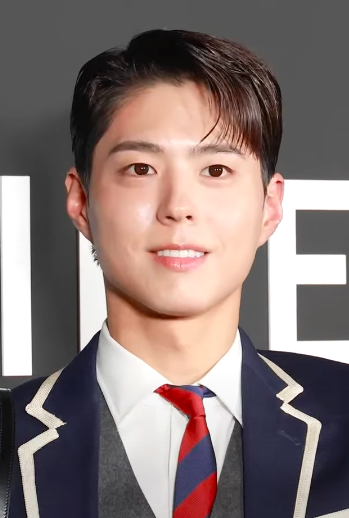
Park Bo-gum (Dong-ju)

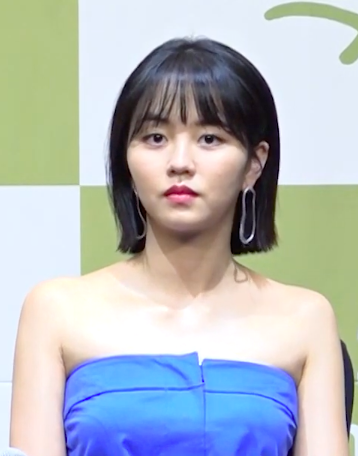
Kim So-hyun (Han-na)

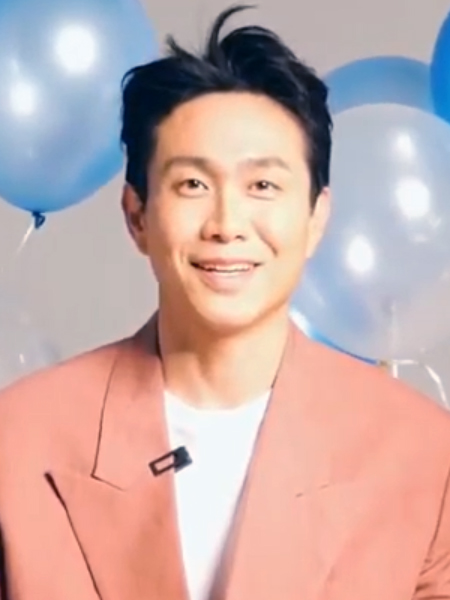
Oh Jung-se (Ju-yeong)

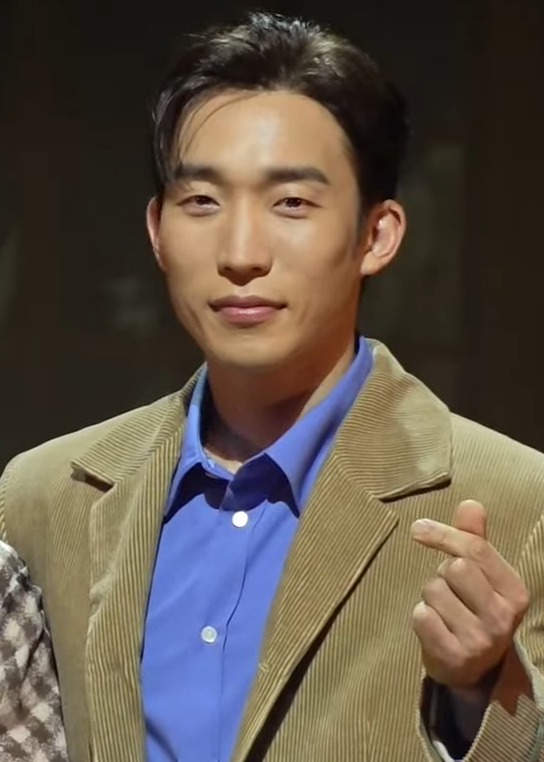
Lee Sang-yi (Jong-hyeon)

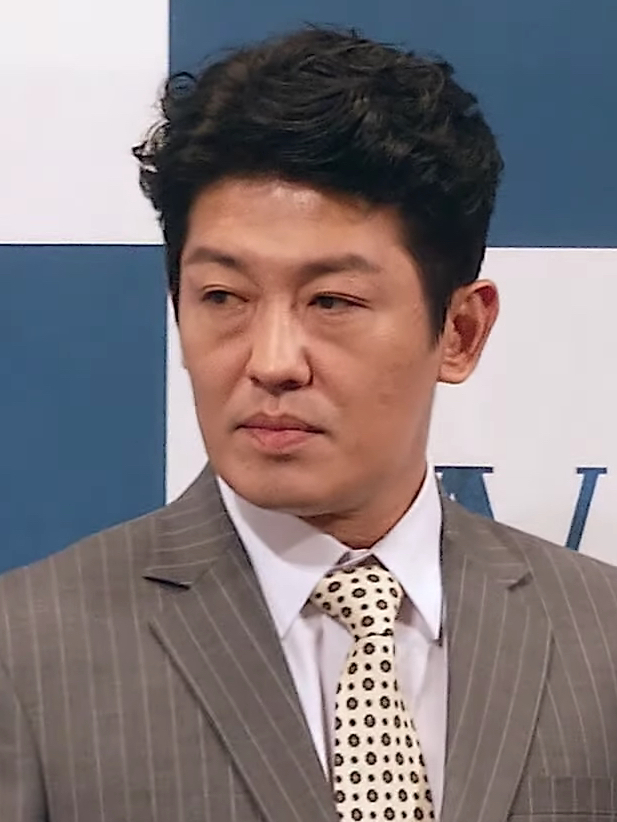
Heo Sung-tae (Man-sik)

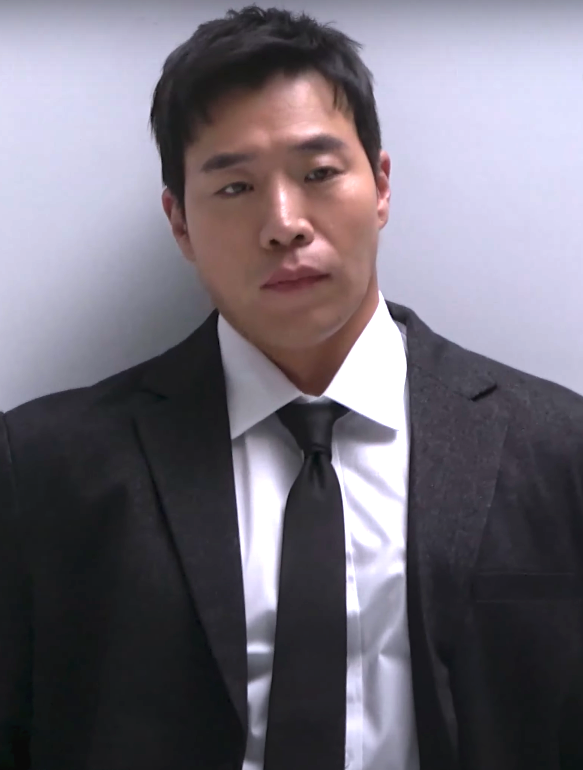
Tae Won-seok (Jae-hong)

In July 2023, Park Bo-gum and Oh Jung-se were reported as lead actors of the series. In August 2023, Kim So-hyun was reportedly cast. Park and Kim were officially confirmed to portray the main characters in January 2024, while Oh, Lee Sang-yi, Heo Sung-tae, and Tae Won-seok confirmed their appearances in July 2024.

=== Filming ===
The cast and crew had a full script reading on March 21, 2024. Principal photography began later that month. On August 28, 2024, it was reported that the filming was temporarily suspended after Park sustained a minor leg injury while doing an action scene in Busan and received treatment at a hospital in Seoul.

=== Marketing ===
To promote the series, Park Bo-gum made a surprise appearance in JTBC's nightly newscast Newsroom and served as weather forecaster on May 26, 2025. Kim So-hyun and Lee Sang-yi also appeared as weather forecasters in the following two days. In addition, Lee and Heo Sung-tae made guest appearances in the 12th episode of Park's late-night music talk show The Seasons: Park Bo-gum's Cantabile.

== Media ==
=== Original soundtrack ===
Good Boy Original Soundtrack

Soundtrack album by Various Artists
- Released: July 22, 2025
- Genres: Soundtrack, Ballad, Pop
- Languages: Korean, English
- Labels: Warner Music Korea, SLL
- Producers: Heo Sung-jin, 3SCAPE, DRM, Collie, Diori, Oh Eun-ah, etc.

The original soundtrack was headed by music director Heo Sung-jin under Warner Music Korea and features artists Max, Young K of Day6, Hynn, TWS, George, Junny, and Katseye. Lead actor Park Bo-gum also released an original song for the seventh part of the soundtrack titled "Waterfall" which was released on July 13, 2025.

==== Part 1 ====
All lyrics are written by Heo Sung-jin, Andreas Öhrn, and Jimmy Claeson; all music is composed by Heo, D.Ori, Öhrn, and Claeson.

Released on June 1, 2025
No.	Title	Artist	Length
1.	"Get in the Ring"	Max	3:50
2.	"Get in the Ring" (Inst.)		3:50
Total length:			7:40

==== Part 2 ====
All lyrics are written by Heo Sung-jin and Demian; all music is composed by Heo, Dunk, and MLC.

Released on June 8, 2025
No.	Title	Artist	Length
1.	"Love Will Find a Way" (나무가 될게)	Young K	3:43
2.	"Love Will Find a Way" (나무가 될게; Inst.)		3:43
Total length:			7:26

==== Part 3 ====
All tracks are written by Heo Sung-jin, Lee So-won, and Kim Mi-kyung.

Released on June 14, 2025
No.	Title	Artist	Length
1.	"With Your Love" (날 안아, 사랑으로)	Hynn	3:55
2.	"With Your Love" (날 안아, 사랑으로; Inst.)		3:55
Total length:			7:10

==== Part 4 ====
All lyrics are written by Heo Sung-jin, Dunk, and David Simon; all music is composed by Heo and Dunk.

Released on June 22, 2025
No.	Title	Artist	Length
1.	"Brand New Day"	TWS	3:26
2.	"Brand New Day" (Inst.)		3:26
Total length:			6:52

==== Part 5 ====
Released on June 29, 2025
No.	Title	Artist	Length
1.	"All Alone"	George	4:24
2.	"All Alone" (Inst.)		4:24
Total length:			8:48

==== Part 6 ====
Released on July 6, 2025
No.	Title	Artist	Length
1.	"Time Lapse"	Junny	3:22
2.	"Time Lapse" (Inst.)		3:22
3.	"Time Lapse (English Version)"		3:22
4.	"Time Lapse"	Katseye	3:19
5.	"Time Lapse" (Inst.)		3:19
Total length:			16:04

==== Part 7 ====
All music is composed by Heo Sung-jin, DUNK, Andreas Öhrn, and Jimmy Claeson.

Released on July 13, 2025
No.	Title	Artist	Length
1.	"Waterfall"	Park Bo-gum	3:17
2.	"Waterfall" (Inst.)		3:17
Total length:			6:34

=== Book ===
A two-volume script book was published in August 2025. It included the unedited screenplay by Lee Dae-il with investigation reports, case outlines, and detailed descriptions of props from the series. Also included are unreleased 22-page character introduction as well as personnel record cards from the National Police Agency and Customs Service.

== Release ==
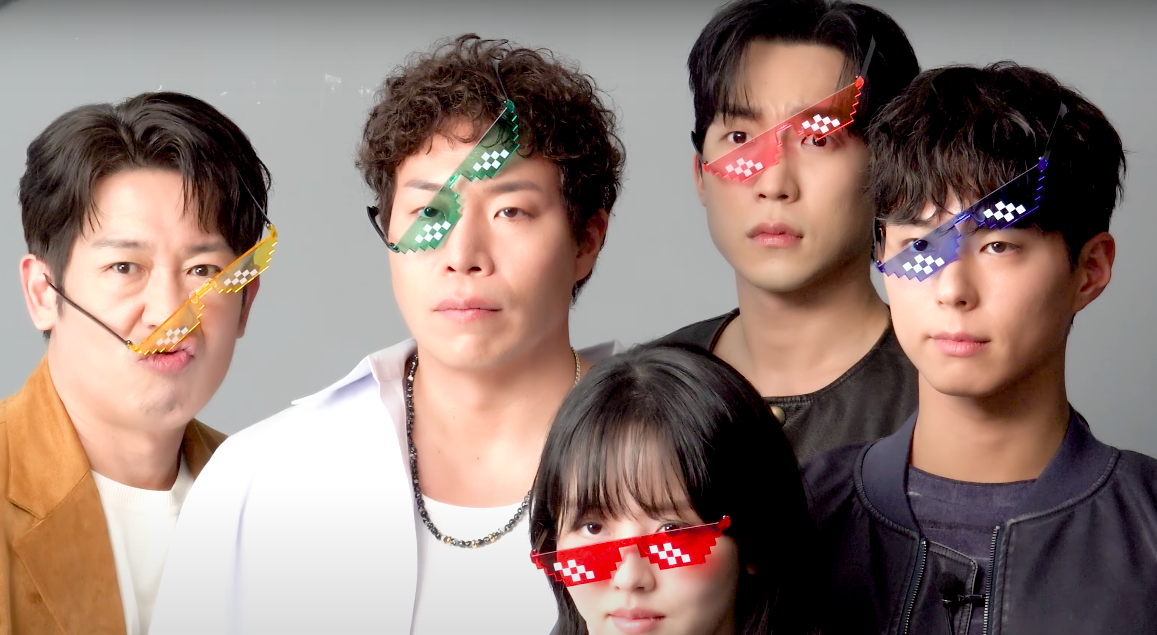
Cast members Heo Sung-tae, Tae Won-seok, Kim So-hyun, Lee Sang-yi, and Park Bo-gum (L-R) at a promotional event for the series, May 2025

The series had its global premiere at Iconsiam in Bangkok, Thailand attended by Park Bo-gum, Kim So-hyun, and Lee Sang-yi on May 31, 2025. It premiered on JTBC on the same day and airs every Saturday and Sunday at 22:40 (KST), and is also domestically available to watch via live stream on TVING, CHZZK, and Coupang Play, as well as on-demand stream on Netflix, Disney+, and Wavve. Internationally, it streams exclusively via Amazon Prime Video in over 240 countries and territories.

== Reception ==
=== Critical response ===
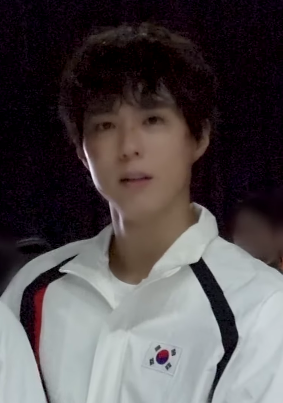
Park Bo-gum, pictured in costume as his character Yoon Dong-ju, received praise for his performance

The Korea Times praised the series for its "bold, comic-book-style take on justice" through "punchy and satisfying narrative" and commended Park Bo-gum for his "fresh charisma" and for bringing a "dramatic transformation" that is a "clear shift" from his previous roles that made him a household name. The publication also praised Shim Na-yeon's "fast pacing and stylish direction". The Chosun Ilbo applauded Park's versatility in portraying action, comedy, and romance "boldly showing off physicality" in his performance. Gulf News added that the series is a "compelling drama" with "emotional sharpness" that "ups the ante with blockbuster-level pacing, punchy editing, and a score that pulses with intensity" resulting to "a drama that feels more like a movie". Per Screen Rant, the series "manages to blend humor with action in an effortless way, while also having emotional depth" with every element coming "together nicely, from the show's pacing to its intriguing premise" and "how well the actors embody their characters".

=== Impact ===
The big data analytics firm Good Data Corporation reported that Park Bo-gum ranked first in overall topicality making him the "Most Buzzworthy Performer" (TV and OTT; Drama and Entertainment) for seven consecutive weeks since the series premiered, surpassing the entire cast of Squid Game 3 which aired at the same period. Three weeks prior to its first episode, Good Boy entered the top 10 of Good Data Corporation's topicality indices, eventually topping the charts for three weeks after its premiere, and remaining in the top three for the remainder of its run.

An international and domestic hit, Good Boy ranked in the top 3 of Prime Video's Global Top 10 Shows during and beyond its run, peaking at #2, and ranking in the top 10 in several territories worldwide including North America where it was the only non-US production listed. It was also #1 on Netflix domestically for several weeks and entered Netflix's Global Top 10 Non-English Shows at #9 despite it only being available on the platform in South Korea.

=== Viewership ===
Good Boy : South Korea viewers per episode (millions)

Season	Episode number																Average
Season	1	2	3	4	5	6	7	8	9	10	11	12	13	14	15	16	Average
1	1.169	1.320	1.436	1.426	1.489	1.564	1.565	1.595	1.403	1.559	1.349	1.370	1.715	1.725	1.588	1.998	1.517

Source: Audience measurement performed nationwide by Nielsen Korea.

Average TV viewership ratings
Ep.	Original broadcast date	Average audience share (Nielsen Korea)	
Ep.	Original broadcast date	Nationwide	Seoul
1	May 31, 2025	4.813% (1st)	5.744% (1st)
2	June 1, 2025	5.251% (1st)	5.589% (1st)
3	June 7, 2025	5.594% (1st)	5.405% (1st)
4	June 8, 2025	5.318% (1st)	5.784% (1st)
5	June 14, 2025	5.940% (1st)	5.660% (1st)
6	June 15, 2025	6.210% (1st)	5.917% (1st)
7	June 21, 2025	6.363% (1st)	6.076% (1st)
8	June 22, 2025	6.423% (1st)	6.483% (1st)
9	June 28, 2025	5.723% (1st)	5.602% (1st)
10	June 29, 2025	6.079% (1st)	5.987% (1st)
11	July 5, 2025	5.443% (1st)	5.063% (1st)
12	July 6, 2025	5.532% (1st)	4.910% (1st)
13	July 12, 2025	6.663% (1st)	6.487% (1st)
14	July 13, 2025	6.642% (1st)	6.943% (1st)
15	July 19, 2025	6.616% (1st)	6.308% (1st)
16	July 20, 2025	8.125% (1st)	7.702% (1st)
Average		6.046%	5.979%
In the table above, the blue numbers represent the lowest ratings and the red numbers represent the highest ratings.; This drama airs on a cable channel/pay TV which normally has a smaller audience share than free-to-air public broadcasters (KBS, SBS, MBC, and EBS).

=== Accolades ===
Name of the award ceremony, year presented, category, nominee of the award, and the result of the nomination
Award ceremony	Year	Category	Nominee	Result	Ref.
APAN Star Awards	2025	Top Excellence Award, Actor in a Miniseries	Park Bo-gum	Nominated	
Asia Contents Awards & Global OTT Awards	2025	Best Actor	Park Bo-gum	Nominated	
Asia Contents Awards & Global OTT Awards	2025	Best Director	Shim Na-yeon	Nominated	
Asia Contents Awards & Global OTT Awards	2025	Best Supporting Actor	Oh Jung-se	Won	
Asia Artist Awards	2025	Best Artist, Actor	Park Bo-gum	Won	
Asia Artist Awards	2025	Asia Star Award, Actor	Park Bo-gum	Won	
Korea Drama Awards	2025	Best Drama	Good Boy	Nominated	
Korea Drama Awards	2025	Top Excellence Award, Actor	Park Bo-gum	Nominated	
Korea Drama Awards	2025	Excellence Award, Actress	Kim So-hyun	Nominated	
Korea Drama Awards	2025	Scene Stealer Award (Female)	Lee Ho-jung	Won	
Korea Drama Awards	2025	Villain Award	Oh Jung-se	Won	
FUNdex Awards	2025	Best Leading Male Performer on TV	Park Bo-gum	Nominated	

=== Listicles ===
Name of publisher, year listed, name of listicle, recipient, and placement
Publisher	Year	Listicle	Placement	Ref.
GQ India	2025	10 Favourite Korean Dramas of 2025, So Far	Included	
