= Shim Na-yeon =

South Korean director (born 1987)

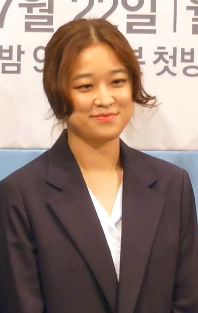
- Shim in 2019
- Born: 1987 (age 38–39); South Korea
- Occupation: Director

Korean name
- Hangul: 심나연
- RR: Sim Nayeon
- MR: Sim Nayŏn

Shim Na-yeon (Korean: 심나연; born 1987), also credited as Sim Na-yeon, is a South Korean director known for directing the television series Beyond Evil (2021), The Good Bad Mother (2023), and Good Boy (2025).

== Filmography ==
Year	Title	Notes	Ref.
2016	Secret Healer	Co-director	
2016	Fantastic	Co-director	
2017	Hip Hop Teacher (드라마페스타 - 힙한선생)	Drama special	
2017	Han Yeo Reum's Memory (드라마페스타- 한여름의 추억)	Drama special	
2019	At Eighteen		
2021	Beyond Evil		
2023	The Good Bad Mother		
2025	Good Boy		

== Accolades ==
Name of the award ceremony, year presented, category, nominee of the award, and the result of the nomination
Award ceremony	Year	Category	Nominee / Work	Result	Ref.
Baeksang Arts Awards	2021	Best Drama	Beyond Evil	Won	
Baeksang Arts Awards	2021	Best Director	Beyond Evil	Nominated	
Baeksang Arts Awards	2024	Best Drama	The Good Bad Mother	Nominated	
Global OTT Awards	2025	Best Director	Good Boy	Nominated	
