= Lee Do-hyun =

South Korean actor (born 1995)

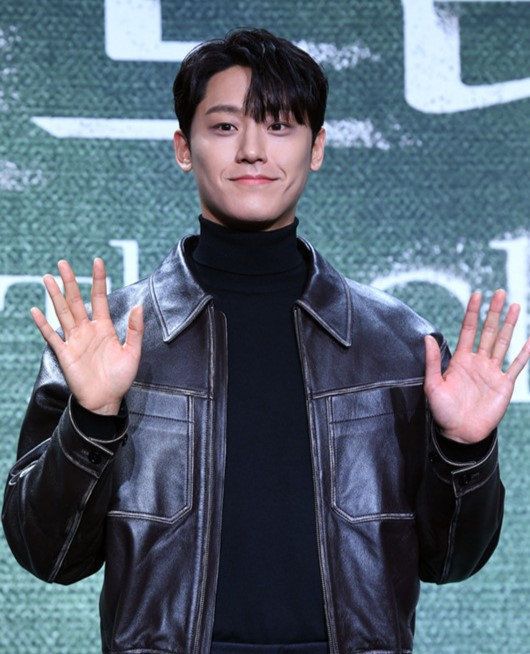
- Lee in December 2022
- Born: Lim Dong-hyun; April 11, 1995 (age 31); Seoul, South Korea
- Education: Chung-Ang University (Department of Film and Theater)
- Occupation: Actor
- Years active: 2017–present
- Agent: YH

Korean name
- Hangul: 임동현
- RR: Im Donghyeon
- MR: Im Tonghyŏn

Stage name
- Hangul: 이도현
- RR: I Dohyeon
- MR: I Tohyŏn

Lim Dong-hyun (Korean: 임동현; born April 11, 1995), known professionally as Lee Do-hyun (Korean: 이도현), is a South Korean actor. He first gained recognition for his supporting role in Hotel del Luna (2019), and went on to star in the television series 18 Again (2020), Sweet Home (2020–2024), Youth of May (2021), The Glory (2022–2023), and The Good Bad Mother (2023), as well as the film Exhuma (2024).

== Early life and education ==
Lee Do-hyun was born in Seoul, South Korea on April 11, 1995. Lee is the eldest son and has a younger brother, Lim Dong-hyuk, who has an intellectual disability. Lee graduated from the Department of Film and Theater at Chung-Ang University.

== Career ==
=== 2017–2018: Career beginnings ===
Lee made his acting debut in the 2017 black comedy Prison Playbook, in which he portrayed the young version of Jung Kyung-ho's character.

In 2018, Lee was cast in the romantic television series Still 17 in a supporting role as a member of the high school's rowing club. For his performance, he was nominated in the "Character of the Year" category at the 2018 SBS Drama Awards alongside Ahn Hyo-seop and Jo Hyun-sik. The same year, Lee also appeared in Clean with Passion for Now, playing the female lead's younger brother and a promising Taekwondo athlete.

=== 2019: Rising popularity ===
In 2019, Lee joined the cast of the dark fantasy television series Hotel del Luna which became one of the highest-rated Korean dramas in cable television. He also made a special appearance in tvN's The Great Show. Lee starred in Scouting Report, the fifth drama of KBS Drama Special's tenth season, for which he won the "Best Actor in a One-Act/Special/Short Drama Award" at the 33rd KBS Drama Awards.

=== 2020–present: Transition to lead roles ===
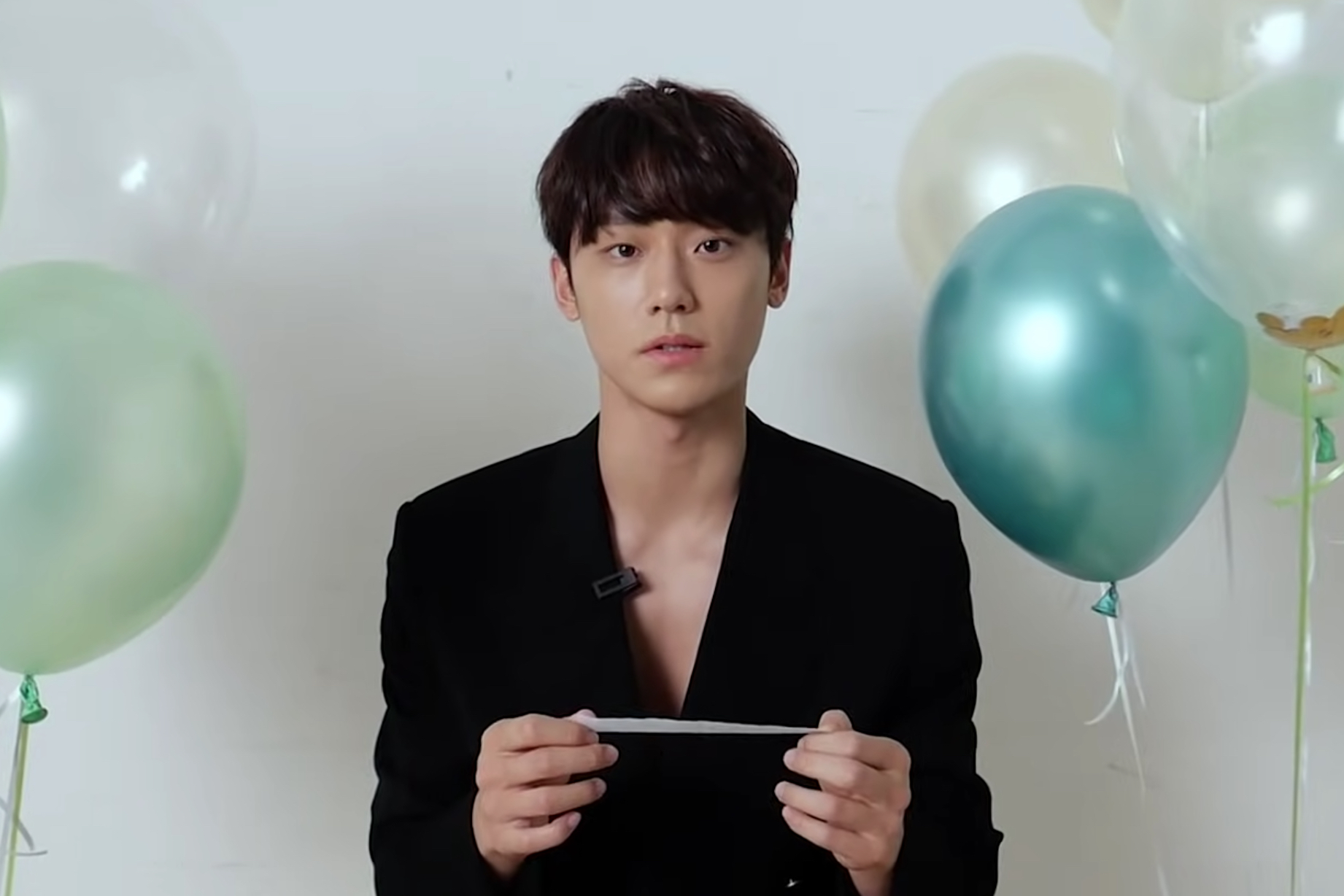
Lee for Marie Claire Korea in December 2020

In 2020, Lee had his first lead role in the romantic comedy 18 Again, based on the 2009 American film 17 Again. His performance in the drama earned him the Best New Actor award in television at the 57th Baeksang Arts Awards and Best New Actor award at the 7th APAN Star Awards. Later that year, he had a starring role in Netflix's Sweet Home, adapted from the webtoon of the same name. He received a good response for portraying a cool-headed and cynical character.

In 2021, Lee appeared in Beyond Evil, directed by Shim Na-yeon, where he played younger self of Shin Ha-kyun's character. He also starred in KBS2's Youth of May, a drama set in 1980 during the Gwangju uprising, earned him a "Next Generation Melo-king" title for his spectacular performance in a melodrama genre. Later in July 2021, Lee was confirmed to join the tvN drama Melancholia with Im Soo-jung, airing in the second half of 2021. At the end of 2021, Lee became the MC of the 2021 KBS Drama Awards with Sung Si-kyung and Kim So-hyun.

In 2022, Lee starred in the web series Reincarnation Romance, a short web series advertising motion sickness pills. This is the third reunion with Go Min-si. In December, Lee returned to the small screen with the Netflix drama written by writer Kim Eun-sook titled The Glory, with Song Hye-kyo. In 2023, Lee chose Death's Game as his last project before joining the military because of the bond he made with director Ha Byung-hoon, which he worked with in 18 Again.

== Personal life ==
=== Military service ===
On February 2, 2023, it was reported that Lee would enlist in the military for the first half of the year. Later the agency confirmed that no decision has been made and that if the date of the mandatory military service is received, it would be told for sure. On August 3, 2023, Yuehua Entertainment announced that Lee would enlist at the Air Force military band on August 14. On May 13, 2025, Lee was discharged after serving 21 months in the military.

=== Relationship ===
On April 1, 2023, Yuehua Entertainment confirmed that Lee is dating actress Lim Ji-yeon, whom he met while filming The Glory.

== Filmography ==
=== Film ===
Year	Title	Role	Notes	Ref.
2017	Summer Night	Lim Seo-jin	Bit part (Short film)	
2024	Exhuma	Yoon Bong-gil		

=== Television series ===
Year	Title	Role	Notes	Ref.
2017–2018	Prison Playbook	young Lee Joon-ho	Cameo (Episodes 1, 6, 9)	
2018	Still 17	Dong Hae-beom		
2018–2019	Clean with Passion for Now	Gil Oh-dol		
2019	Hotel del Luna	Go Cheong-myeong		
2019	The Great Show	young Wi Dae-han	Cameo (Episodes 1–3)	
2019	KBS Drama Special – "Scouting Report"	Kwak Jae-won	Season 10, episode 5	
2020	18 Again	young Hong Dae-young / Go Woo-young		
2020–2024	Sweet Home	Lee Eun-hyuk	Main role (Season 1 & 3) / Cameo (Season 2)	
2021	Beyond Evil	young Lee Dong-sik	Cameo (Episodes 1–2, 5, 11)	
2021	Youth of May	Hwang Hee-tae		
2021	Melancholia	Baek Seung-yoo / Baek Min-jae		
2022–2023	The Glory	Joo Yeo-jeong		
2023	The Good Bad Mother	Choi Kang-ho		
2023–2024	Death's Game	Jang Geon-woo	Cameo (Episodes 4 and 6)	

=== Hosting ===
Year	Title	Notes	Ref.
2021	2021 KBS Drama Awards	with Sung Si-kyung and Kim So-hyun	

=== Music video ===
Year	Title	Artist	Album
2025	"Being a Good Girl Hurts" (착하다는 말이 제일 싫어)	Choi Ye-na	Blooming Wings

== Accolades ==
=== Awards and nominations ===
Name of the award ceremony, year presented, category, nominee of the award, and the result of the nomination
Award ceremony	Year	Category	Nominee / Work	Result	Ref.
APAN Star Awards	2021	Best New Actor	18 Again	Won	
Asia Artist Awards	2020	Popularity Award (Actor)	Lee Do-hyun	Nominated	
Asia Artist Awards	2021	Rookie of the Year Award	Youth of May	Won	
Asian Academy Creative Awards	2021	Best Actor in Supporting Role (National Winners – Korea)	Sweet Home	Won	
Asian Film Awards	2025	Best Newcomer	Exhuma	Nominated	
Baeksang Arts Awards	2021	Best New Actor – Television	18 Again	Won	
Baeksang Arts Awards	2024	Best New Actor – Film	Exhuma	Won	
Blue Dragon Film Awards	2024	Best New Actor	Exhuma	Nominated	
Blue Dragon Series Awards	2022	Best New Actor	Youth of May	Nominated	
Brand Customer Loyalty Awards	2023	Best Actor – OTT	The Glory	Nominated	
Brand of the Year Awards	2021	Rising Star Actor	Lee Do-hyun	Won	
Brand of the Year Awards	2023	Male Actor of the Year (OTT)	Lee Do-hyun	Won	
Buil Film Awards	2024	Best New Actor	Exhuma	Nominated	
Director's Cut Awards	2025	Best New Actor (Film)	Exhuma	Won	
Global Film & Television Huading Awards	2023	Best Global Teleplay Leading Actor	The Glory	Nominated	
KBS Drama Awards	2019	Best Actor in a One-Act/Special/Short Drama	Drama Special – Scouting Report	Won	
KBS Drama Awards	2021	Top Excellence Award, actor	Youth of May	Won	
KBS Drama Awards	2021	Excellence Award, Actor in a Miniseries	Youth of May	Nominated	
KBS Drama Awards	2021	Best Couple Award	Lee Do-hyun (with Go Min-si); Youth of May	Won	
Kinolights Awards	2021	Actor of the Year (Domestic)	Sweet Home; Youth of May	5th	
Korea First Brand Awards	2021	Best New Actor	18 Again	Won	
SBS Drama Awards	2018	Character of the Year	Still 17	Nominated	
Seoul International Drama Awards	2021	Outstanding Korean Actor	Sweet Home	Nominated	

=== Honors ===
Name of country or organization, year given, and name of honor or award
Country or Organization	Year	Honor or Award	Ref.
Newsis K-Expo Cultural Awards (Note: Established in 2019 and co-sponsored by Korea's Ministry of Culture, Sports and Tourism, Ministry of Foreign Affairs, Korea Creative Content Agency, Seoul Metropolitan Council and the Seoul Tourism Organization, it awards cultural icons, businesses, and individuals who have contributed greatly to Hallyu, the Korean wave.)	2023	National Assembly Culture, Sports and Tourism Committee Award	

=== Listicles ===
Name of publisher, year listed, name of listicle, and placement
Publisher	Year	Listicle	Placement	Ref.
Cine 21	2020	New Actor to Watch in 2021	1st	
Cine 21	2023	Top 5 New Actor to Watch in 2023	2nd	
Cine 21	2024	Korean Film Next 50 – Actors	Placed	
Forbes	2022	Korea Power Celebrity Rising Star	Placed	
