= Tae Won-seok =

South Korean actor (born 1989)

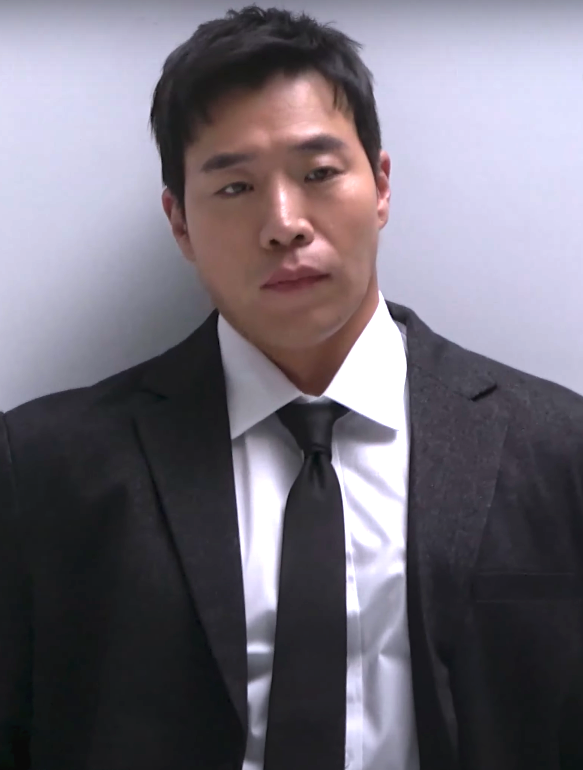
- Tae in 2023
- Born: June 10, 1989 (age 37); South Korea
- Occupation: Actor
- Years active: 2010–present
- Agent: Story J Company

Korean name
- Hangul: 태원석
- RR: Tae Wonseok
- MR: T'ae Wŏnsŏk

Tae Won-seok (Korean: 태원석; born June 10, 1989) is a South Korean actor. He is known for his roles in the television series Player (2018), its sequel The Player 2: Master of Swindlers (2024), and Good Boy (2025).

== Filmography ==
=== Film ===
Year	Title	Role	Notes	Ref.
2019	Extreme Job	Ansan Branch Organization Member		
2021	Midnight	Soldier		
2024	The Killers	Head of Department		

=== Television series ===
Year	Title	Role	Notes	Ref.
2018	Player	Do Jin-woong		
2019	Class of Lies	Mask designer	Cameo; Episode 1	
2020	Nobody Knows	Go Hee-dong		
2020	Private Lives	Hanson		
2021	Sisyphus: The Myth	Yeo Bong-sun		
2022	Glitch	Captain Prince		
2022	Under the Queen's Umbrella	Seo Ham-deok		
2023-present	Bloodhounds	Kang In-beom		
2024	The Player 2: Master of Swindlers	Do Jin-woong		
2024	The Tale of Lady Ok	Pirate	Cameo	
2025	Good Boy	Shin Jae-hong		
