= Baeksang Arts Award for Best Educational Show =

South Korean annual television award

- Awarded for: Best South Korean educational show of the year
- Country: South Korea
- Presented by: Baeksang Arts Awards
- Most recent winner: Special-Hakjeon (2025)
- Website: baeksangartsawards

The Baeksang Arts Award for Best Educational Show (Korean: 백상예술대상 TV부문 교양 작품상; RR: Baeksang Yesul Daesang TV Bumun Gyoyang Jakpumsang) is annually presented at the Baeksang Arts Awards ceremony.

== List of winners ==
#	Year	Program	Network
34	1998	Sunday Special (일요스페셜)	KBS
35	1999	Siberia, In Search of Lost Korean Wild Animals (시베리아, 잃어버린 한국의 야생동물을 찾아서)	EBS
36	2000	Conversations with the Past (역사스페셜)	KBS
37	2001	Videorecording Hospitals for 24 Hours (영상기록병원24시)	KBS
38	2002	Special: Islam (스페셜 이슬람)	MBC
39	2003	Wildlife in Serengeti (야생의 초원-세렝게티)	MBC
40	2004	Counterattack on the Environment (환경의 역습)	SBS
41	2005	The Conker Tree (지금도 마로니에는)	EBS
42	2006	I'm going to the second year of summer school in Tokyo (나는 가요,도쿄 제2의 여름학교)	SBS
43	2007	Emergency Dispatch SOS 24 (긴급출동 SOS 24)	SBS
44	2008	Asian Corridor in Heaven (인사이트 아시아 - 차마고도)	KBS
45	2009	Unanswered Questions: Choosing Dokdo (그것이 알고싶다 '독도의 선택')	SBS
46	2010	Tears of the Amazon (아마존의 눈물)	MBC
47	2011	What is School (학교란 무엇인가)	EBS
48	2012	The Story of Mathematics (문명과 수학)	EBS
49	2013	Korean Cuisine and Dining (한국인의 밥상)	KBS
50	2014	Unanswered Questions (그것이 알고 싶다)	SBS
51	2015	Food Odyssey (요리인류)	KBS
52	2016	Examination (시험)	EBS
53	2017	Battle of Tongues	JTBC
54	2018	Dance Sports Girls (땐뽀걸즈)	KBS
55	2019	Journalism Talk Show J (저널리즘 토크쇼 J)	KBS
56	2020	Giant Peng TV (자이언트펭TV)	EBS
57	2021	Archive Project: Modern Korea 2 (아카이브 프로젝트 - 모던코리아2)	KBS
58	2022	Documentary Insight: National Team (다큐인사이트 국가대표)	KBS
59	2023	Adult Kim Jang-ha (어른 김장하)	MBC Gyeongnam
60	2024	Japanese Ozawa (일본사람 오자와)	KBS1 TV
61	2025	Special-Hakjeon (SBS 스페셜 - 학전 그리고 뒷것 김민기)	SBS
62	2026	Our Shining Days	KBS

== Sources ==
- "Baeksang Arts Awards Nominees and Winners Lists". Naver Movie (in Korean).
- "Baeksang Arts Awards Winners Lists". Baeksang Arts Awards (in Korean).
