= Player (TV series) =

South Korean television series

- Promotional poster for season two
- Also known as: The Player; Player 2: War of Gamblers; The Player 2: Master of Swindlers
- Hangul: 플레이어
- RR: Peulleieo
- MR: P'ŭlleiŏ
- Genre: Action; Crime
- Developed by: Studio Dragon (planning; season 2)
- Written by: Shin Jae-hyung (season 1); Park Sang-moon (season 2); Choi Seul-gi (season 2)
- Directed by: Go Jae-hyun (season 1); So Jae-hyun (season 2)
- Starring: Song Seung-heon; Krystal Jung; Lee Si-eon; Tae Won-seok; Oh Yeon-seo; Jang Gyu-ri
- Music by: Si Seong-won (season 1); Jeong Seung-hyun (season 1); Kim Joon-seok (season 2); Jeong Se-rin (season 2)
- Country of origin: South Korea
- Original language: Korean
- No. of seasons: 2
- No. of episodes: 26

Production
- Executive producer: Kim Gin-hong
- Producers: Lee Geun-jang; Jang Si-woo
- Running time: 60 minutes
- Production companies: Studio Dragon; iWill Media (season 1); People Story Company (season 2)

Original release
- Network: OCN (season 1)
- Release: September 29 – November 11, 2018
- Network: tvN (season 2)
- Release: June 3 – July 9, 2024

Player (Korean: 플레이어) is a South Korean television series starring Song Seung-heon, Krystal Jung, Lee Si-eon, Tae Won-seok, Oh Yeon-seo, and Jang Gyu-ri. The first season aired on OCN from September 29, to November 11, 2018, every Saturday and Sunday at 22:20 (KST). The second season aired on tvN from June 3, to July 9, 2024, every Monday and Tuesday at 20:50 (KST).

== Synopsis ==
=== Season 1 ===
The story about the four talented individuals in their respective fields who create an elite team to solve crimes in partnership with a righteous prosecutor. Together, they confiscate black money and make sure that those who earn money through crimes will be arrested.

== Series overview ==
Season	Episodes	Originally released			Airtime
Season	Episodes	First released	Last released	Network	Airtime
1	14	September 29, 2018	November 11, 2018	OCN	Saturday and Sunday at 22:20 (KST)
2	12	June 3, 2024	July 9, 2024	tvN	Monday and Tuesday at 20:50 (KST)

== Cast and characters ==
=== Main ===
- Song Seung-heon as Kang Ha-ri / Choi Soo-hyuk

A veteran conman from a family of investigators who was born bold and gifted with words.

- Krystal Jung as Cha Ah-ryung (season 1)

A skilled driver who grew up in an orphanage after being abandoned by her parents.

- Lee Si-eon as Lim Byung-min

A talented hacker who had a past with Chairman Chun.

- Tae Won-seok as Do Jin-woong

A powerful fighter who had accidentally worked for "that person".

- Oh Yeon-seo as Jeong Soo-min (season 2)

An assistant to Ha-ri and the team's watcher.

- Jang Gyu-ri as Cha Jae-yi (season 2)

Ah-ryung's younger sister who is also a skilled driver. Her real name is Cha Hae-ryung.

=== Supporting ===
==== Public Prosecutors' Office ====
- Kim Won-hae as Prosecutor Jang In-gyu

The prosecutor who teamed up with Ha-ri and his team.

- Ahn Se-ho as Investigator Maeng Ji-hoon
- Lee Hwang-ui as Yoo Ki-hoon

==== Target ====
- Kim Jong-tae as "that person" (real name: Yeon Je-seok)

A consultant and power broker for politicians.

- Kwak Ja-hyung as Cheon Dong-seob

==== People around Ha-ri ====
- Huh Joon-ho as Choi Hyun-gi

Ha-ri's father and former team leader of Special Corruption Division.

- Yoo Ye-bin as Cho Yeon-hee

A doctor and the only person who knows Ha-ri's past.

=== Others ===
- Min Joon-hyun as Team Leader Shim Dal-soo
- Kang Min-tae as gangster
- Kim Hyung-mook as Na Won-hak

The corrupt president director.

- Lee Hwa-ryong
- Min Joon-hyun
- Kim Sung-cheol as Ji Sung-gu
- Lee Chung-mi as Yang Hae-joo
- Jin Mo as Wang Seob
- Kim Seo-kyung as Mike

=== Special appearances ===
- Yoo Seung-ho as a security guard (Ep. 1)
- Hong Seok-cheon as a driving instructor (Ep. 1)
- Wang Ji-hye as Ryu Hyun-ja (Ep. 7–8)
- Kang Hye-won as Mi-woo (Season 2, Ep. 2)
- Nana as Eun-na (Season 2, Ep. 5)
- Lee Soo-hyuk as Mr. Myeong (Season 2, Ep. 6–7)
- Yoon Ji-on as Kim Soo-chan (Season 2, Ep. 7)
- Heo Sung-tae as Lim Sang-sik (Season 2, Ep. 8–9)
- Lee Sung-kyung as a mysterious woman (Season 2, Ep. 12)

== Production ==
Early working titles of the series were Hustle (허슬) and Round (판; Pan).

On July 12, 2022, it was announced that the series would return with second season in the second half of 2023, under the title Player: War of Gamblers (플레이어: 꾼들의 전쟁; Peulleieo: kkundeurui jeonjaeng). On January 27, 2023, it was reported that filming was scheduled to begin in March 2023, and actresses Oh Yeon-seo and Jang Gyu-ri were in talks for the main roles. In January 2024, it was officially announced that the second season is included on tvN's 2024 drama line-up.

== Original soundtrack ==
Player OST

Soundtrack album by Various artists
- Recorded: 2018
- Genre: Soundtrack
- Languages: Korean; English
- Labels: Blending; Music Buddy

=== Part 1 ===
Released on October 6, 2018
No.	Title	Lyrics	Music	Artist	Length
1.	"Player" (플레이어)	Dok2; Jinsil; Lee Jung-ha	Lee Jong-soo; Yang Sung-woo	Dok2 feat. Jinsil (Mad Soul Child)	03:05
2.	"Player" (Inst.)		Lee Jong-soo; Yang Sung-woo		03:05
Total length:					06:10

=== Part 2 ===
Released on October 14, 2018
No.	Title	Lyrics	Music	Artist	Length
1.	"Changer"	Kim Ho-kyung	1601	The Vane	03:15
2.	"Changer" (Inst.)		1601		03:15
Total length:					06:30

=== Part 3 ===
Released on October 21, 2018
No.	Title	Lyrics	Music	Artist	Length
1.	"Yesterday"	Min Yeon-jae	1601	JK Kim Dong-wook	04:00
2.	"Yesterday" (Inst.)		1601		04:00
Total length:					08:00

=== Part 4 ===
Released on October 28, 2018
No.	Title	Lyrics	Music	Artist	Length
1.	"Bluffing"	Min Yeon-jae	1601	Luna (f(x))	03:07
2.	"Bluffing" (Inst.)		1601		03:07
Total length:					06:14

=== Part 5 ===
Released on November 4, 2018
No.	Title	Lyrics	Music	Artist	Length
1.	"Born to Be a Player"	Jung Min-wook	Lee Jong-soo; Yang Sung-woo	Hey Men	03:01
2.	"Born to Be a Player" (Inst.)		Lee Jong-soo; Yang Sung-woo		03:01
Total length:					06:02

=== Part 6 ===
Released on November 4, 2018
No.	Title	Lyrics	Music	Artist	Length
1.	"Anyone"	Lee Jong-soo; Arie	Lee Jong-soo; Yang Sung-woo	Nam Tae-hyun	03:57
2.	"Anyone" (Inst.)		Lee Jong-soo; Yang Sung-woo		03:57
Total length:					07:54

== Viewership ==
Player : South Korea viewers per episode (millions)

Season	Episode number														Average
Season	1	2	3	4	5	6	7	8	9	10	11	12	13	14	Average
1	1.217	1.381	1.136	1.165	1.003	1.171	1.122	1.221	1.200	1.169	0.928	0.958	1.117	1.515	1.165
2	0.940	0.911	0.905	0.671	0.805	0.757	0.866	0.913	0.778	0.860	0.920	0.952	–		0.857

Source: Audience measurement performed nationwide by Nielsen Korea.

Average TV viewership ratings (season 1)
Ep.	Original broadcast date	Average audience share		
Ep.	Original broadcast date	Nielsen Korea		TNmS
Ep.	Original broadcast date	Nationwide	Seoul	Nationwide
1	September 29, 2018	4.474%	5.226%	4.3%
2	September 30, 2018	4.876%	5.638%	4.9%
3	October 6, 2018	4.092%	4.433%	4.8%
4	October 7, 2018	4.186%	4.180%	5.5%
5	October 13, 2018	3.720%	4.196%	N/A
6	October 14, 2018	4.573%	5.097%	N/A
7	October 20, 2018	4.415%	5.393%	N/A
8	October 21, 2018	4.904%	5.302%	N/A
9	October 27, 2018	4.723%	5.531%	N/A
10	October 28, 2018	4.640%	4.928%	N/A
11	November 3, 2018	3.993%	4.425%	N/A
12	November 4, 2018	3.879%	4.116%	N/A
13	November 10, 2018	4.553%	4.780%	N/A
14	November 11, 2018	5.803%	6.249%	N/A
Average		4.488%	4.964%	— (Note: Due to some unpublished ratings, the exact average rating is unknown.)
In the table above, the blue numbers represent the lowest published ratings and the red numbers represent the highest published ratings.; N/A denotes ratings that were not published.; This series aired on a cable channel/pay TV which normally has a relatively smaller audience compared to free-to-air TV/public broadcasters (KBS, SBS, MBC and EBS).

Average TV viewership ratings (season 2)
Ep.	Original broadcast date	Average audience share	
Ep.	Original broadcast date	Nielsen Korea	
Ep.	Original broadcast date	Nationwide	Seoul
1	June 3, 2024	4.185% (2nd)	4.658% (2nd)
2	June 4, 2024	3.966% (2nd)	4.065% (2nd)
3	June 10, 2024	4.188% (2nd)	4.310% (2nd)
4	June 11, 2024	3.537% (2nd)	3.594% (3rd)
5	June 17, 2024	3.531% (2nd)	3.722% (2nd)
6	June 18, 2024	3.570% (2nd)	3.519% (3rd)
7	June 24, 2024	3.810% (1st)	4.178% (1st)
8	June 25, 2024	3.789% (1st)	3.752% (1st)
9	July 1, 2024	3.681% (1st)	3.785% (1st)
10	July 2, 2024	3.929% (1st)	4.302% (1st)
11	July 8, 2024	4.096% (1st)	3.953% (1st)
12	July 9, 2024	4.344% (1st)	4.446% (1st)
Average		3.886%	4.024%
In the table above, the blue numbers represent the lowest published ratings and the red numbers represent the highest published ratings.; This series aired on a cable channel/pay TV which normally has a relatively smaller audience compared to free-to-air TV/public broadcasters (KBS, SBS, MBC and EBS).
