= 57th Baeksang Arts Awards =

2021 edition of award ceremony

- Title card
- Date: May 13, 2021
- Site: KINTEX, Ilsanseo-gu, Gyeonggi Province
- Hosted by: Shin Dong-yup; Bae Suzy
- Organised by: Ilgan Sports; JTBC Plus

Highlights
- Most wins: Film: Moving On (2); Voice of Silence (2); Television: Beyond Evil (3)
- Most nominations: Film: Deliver Us from Evil (6); Moving On (6); The Book of Fish (6); Voice of Silence (6); Television: Beyond Evil (8); It's Okay to Not Be Okay (8)
- Grand Prize – Film: Lee Joon-ik (director) – The Book of Fish
- Grand Prize – TV: Yoo Jae-suk (variety performer)
- Website: baeksangartsawards

Television/radio coverage
- Network: JTBC; TikTok (international)
- Viewership: 2.2% (Nielsen Korea)

The 57th edition of the Baeksang Arts Awards ceremony, organised by Ilgan Sports and JTBC Plus, was held on May 13, 2021, at KINTEX, Ilsanseo-gu, Gyeonggi Province, beginning at 9:00 p.m. KST. It was hosted by Shin Dong-yup and Bae Suzy, and was broadcast live in South Korea by JTBC and internationally by TikTok. The event was held with no on-site audience, due to the COVID-19 pandemic in South Korea. The annual awards ceremony is one of South Korea's most prestigious award shows, recognizing excellence in film, television, and theatre.

The nominees for the 57th Baeksang Arts Awards were announced on April 12, 2021, through the official website. All works released between May 1, 2020, and April 11, 2021, were eligible for nominations. (Note: At least four episodes of a series online or offline needed to have been available by April 11, or else one-third of the entire series. Candidates that competed for previous year's awards were not applicable to be nominated this year.) The final candidates for Grand Prize – Television were variety performer Yoo Jae-suk and drama series Beyond Evil.

The highest honors of the night, Grand Prize (Daesang), were awarded to director Lee Joon-ik of The Book of Fish in the film division and variety performer Yoo Jae-suk in the television division. With three wins, Beyond Evil won the most awards at the ceremony, including the Best Drama, while, It's Okay to Not Be Okay won two awards. In the film division, Voice of Silence and Moving On won two awards each, while with one win, Samjin Company English Class was awarded as the Best Film.

== Winners and nominees ==
- Winners are listed first, highlighted in **boldface**, and indicated with a double dagger (‡).
  - Nominees

=== Film ===
**Grand Prize**	**Best Film**
**Lee Joon-ik (director) – The Book of Fish ‡**	**Samjin Company English Class ‡**; Moving On; Deliver Us from Evil; Voice of Silence; The Book of Fish
**Best Director**	**Best New Director**
**Hong Eui-jeong – Voice of Silence ‡**; Hong Won-chan – Deliver Us from Evil; Lee Jong-pil – Samjin Company English Class; Lee Joon-ik – The Book of Fish; Yoon Dan-bi – Moving On	**Yoon Dan-bi – Moving On ‡**; Park Ji-wan – The Day I Died: Unclosed Case; Lee Chung-hyun – The Call; Lim Sun-ae – An Old Lady; Hong Eui-jeong – Voice of Silence
**Best Actor**	**Best Actress**
**Yoo Ah-in – Voice of Silence as Tae-in ‡**; Byun Yo-han – The Book of Fish as Chang Dae; Sul Kyung-gu – The Book of Fish as Jeong Yak Jeon; Lee Jung-jae – Deliver Us from Evil as Ray; Cho Jin-woong – Me and Me as Park Hyung-goo	**Jeon Jong-seo – The Call as Oh Young-sook ‡**; Go Ah-sung – Samjin Company English Class as Lee Ja-yeong; Kim Hye-soo – The Day I Died: Unclosed Case as Hyeon-soo; Moon So-ri – Three Sisters as Mi-yeon; Ye Soo-jung – An Old Lady as Shim Hyo‑jeong
**Best Supporting Actor**	**Best Supporting Actress**
**Park Jeong-min – Deliver Us from Evil as Yui ‡**; Koo Kyo-hwan – Peninsula as Captain Seo; Shin Jung-geun – Steel Rain 2: Summit as Jang Ki-sok; Yoo Jae-myung – Voice of Silence as Chang-bok; Huh Joon-ho – Innocence as Mayor Choo	**Kim Sun-young – Three Sisters as Hee-sook ‡**; Bae Jong-ok – Innocence as Chae Hwa-ja; Lee Re – Peninsula as Jooni; Esom – Samjin Company English Class as Jung Yoo-na; Lee Jung-eun – The Day I Died: Unclosed Case as Suncheondaek
**Best New Actor**	**Best New Actress**
**Hong Kyung – Innocence as Jung-soo ‡**; Kim Do-yoon – Peninsula as Chul-min; Ryu Soo-young – Steel Rain 2: Summit as Captain Baek Doo-ho; Park Seung-joon – Moving On as Dong-joo; Lee Bong‑geun – The Singer as Hak Gyoo	**Choi Jung-woon – Moving On as Ok-joo ‡**; Park So-yi – Deliver Us from Evil as Yoo-min; Shin Hye-sun – Innocence as Ahn Jung-in; Jang Yoon-ju – Three Sisters as Mi-ok; Krystal Jung – More Than Family as To-il
**Best Screenplay**	**Technical Award**
**Park Ji-wan – The Day I Died: Unclosed Case ‡**; Kim Se-kyum – The Book of Fish; Yoon Dan-bi – Moving On; Lee Jong-pil – Samjin Company English Class; Hong Eui-jeong – Voice of Silence	**Jeong Seong-jin, Jong Chol-min (VFX) – Space Sweepers ‡**; Lee Eui-tae (Cinematography) – The Book of Fish; Lee Jeon-hyeong, Choi Jae-cheon, Jung Hwang-su (VFX) – Peninsula; Jang Geun-young (Art) – Space Sweepers; Hong Kyung-pyo (Cinematography) – Deliver Us from Evil

==== Films with multiple nominations ====
The following films received multiple nominations:

Nominations	Films
6	Deliver Us from Evil
6	Moving On
6	The Book of Fish
6	Voice of Silence
5	Samjin Company English Class
4	Innocence
4	The Day I Died: Unclosed Case
4	Peninsula
3	Three Sisters
2	An Old Lady
2	The Call
2	Steel Rain 2: Summit
2	Space Sweepers

==== Films with multiple awards ====
The following films received multiple awards:

Wins	Films
2	Moving On
2	Voice of Silence

=== Television ===
**Grand Prize**
**Yoo Jae-suk (variety performer) ‡** Beyond Evil (drama) (JTBC)
**Best Drama**	**Best Director**
**Beyond Evil (JTBC) ‡**; It's Okay to Not Be Okay (tvN); Flower of Evil (tvN); My Unfamiliar Family (tvN); Extracurricular (Netflix)	**Kim Cheol-kyu – Flower of Evil ‡**; Kwon Young-il – My Unfamiliar Family; Kim Hee-won – Vincenzo; Park Shin-woo – It's Okay to Not Be Okay; Shim Na-yeon – Beyond Evil
**Best Entertainment Program**	**Best Educational Show**
**Hangout with Yoo (MBC) ‡**; The Three Ants (KakaoTV); Sing Again (JTBC); You Quiz on the Block (tvN); The Stage of Legends - Archive K (SBS)	**Archive Project - Modern Korea season 2 (KBS) ‡**; Architectural Exporation - House 3 (EBS); A Tied Tail's Story (SBS); Curious Class (JTBC); Battle of the Century: AI vs. Human (SBS)
**Best Actor**	**Best Actress**
**Shin Ha-kyun – Beyond Evil as Lee Dong-sik ‡**; Kim Soo-hyun – It's Okay to Not Be Okay as Moon Gang-tae; Song Joong-ki – Vincenzo as Vincenzo Cassano; Um Ki-joon – The Penthouse: War in Life as Joo Dan-tae / Mr Baek; Lee Joon-gi – Flower of Evil as Baek Hee-sung / Do Hyun-soo	**Kim So-yeon – The Penthouse: War in Life as Cheon Seo-jin ‡**; Kim So-hyun – River Where the Moon Rises as Princess Pyeonggang / Yeom Ga-jin / Queen Yeon; Seo Yea-ji – It's Okay to Not Be Okay as Ko Moon-young; Shin Hye-sun – Mr. Queen as Kim So-yong, Queen Cheorin; Uhm Ji-won – Birthcare Center as Oh Hyun-jin
**Best Supporting Actor**	**Best Supporting Actress**
**Oh Jung-se – It's Okay to Not Be Okay as Moon Sang-tae ‡**; Kim Seon-ho – Start-Up as Han Ji-pyeong; Kim Ji-hoon – Flower of Evil as Baek Hee-sung; Lee Hee-joon – Mouse as Go Moo-chi; Choi Dae-hoon – Beyond Evil as Park Jung-je	**Yeom Hye-ran – The Uncanny Counter as Choo Mae-ok ‡**; Park Ha-sun – Birthcare Center as Cho Eun-jeong; Shin Eun-kyung – The Penthouse: War in Life as Kang Ma-ri; Jang Young-nam – It's Okay to Not Be Okay as Park Haeng-ja; Cha Chung-hwa – Mr. Queen as Court Lady Choi
**Best New Actor**	**Best New Actress**
**Lee Do-hyun – 18 Again as Hong Dae-young (young) / Go Woo-young ‡**; Kim Young-dae – The Penthouse: War in Life as Joo Seok-hoon; Na In-woo – River Where the Moon Rises as On Dal; Nam Yoon-su – Extracurricular as Kwak Ki-tae; Song Kang – Sweet Home as Cha Hyun-soo	**Park Ju-hyun – Extracurricular as Bae Gyu-ri ‡**; Kim Hyun-soo – The Penthouse: War in Life as Bae Ro-na; Park Gyu-young – Sweet Home as Yoon Ji-soo; Lee Joo-young – Times as Seo Jung-in; Choi Sung-eun – Beyond Evil as Yoo Jae-yi
**Best Male Variety Performer**	**Best Female Variety Performer**
**Lee Seung-gi – Master in the House, Busted!, Sing Again, Twogether,‡**; Moon Se-yoon – 2 Days & 1 Night, Delicious guys; Shin Dong-yup – Immortal Songs: Singing the Legend, My Little Old Boy; Yoo Jae-suk – How Do You Play?, Sixth Sense; Jo Se-ho – You Quiz on the Block	**Jang Do-yeon – I Live Alone, Don't be the First One! ‡**; Kim Sook – Where Is My Home, Love Naggers; Song Eun-i – Long Live Independence, Problem Child in House; Jaejae – Long Live Independence, Girls’ High School Mystery Class; Hong Hyun-hee – Omniscient Interfering View, My Golden Kids
**Best Screenplay**	**Technical Award**
**Kim Su-jin – Beyond Evil ‡**; Kim Eun-jung – My Unfamiliar Family; Yoo Jung-hee – Flower of Evil; Jo Yong – It's Okay to Not Be Okay; Ha Myung-hee – Record of Youth	**Cho Sang-kyung (Costume design) – It's Okay to Not Be Okay ‡**; Lee Byung-joo (Visual effects) – Sweet Home; Jang Jong-kyung (Cinematography) – Beyond Evil; Choi Jung-yoon (Music) – The Stage of Legends: Archive K; MBC Design Center VFX Team (Virtual reality) – VR Documentary Meeting People season 2

==== Television programs with multiple nominations ====
The following television programs received multiple nominations:

Nominations	Television programs
8	Beyond Evil
8	It's Okay to Not Be Okay
5	Flower of Evil
5	The Penthouse: War in Life
3	Extracurricular
3	My Unfamiliar Family
3	Sweet Home
2	Birthcare Center
2	Hangout with Yoo
2	Mr. Queen
2	River Where the Moon Rises
2	The Stage of Legends: Archive K
2	You Quiz on the Block
2	Vincenzo

==== Television programs with multiple awards ====
The following television programs received multiple awards:

Wins	Television programs
3	Beyond Evil
2	It's Okay to Not Be Okay

=== Theatre ===
**Baeksang Play**	**Best Short Play**
**We are (No) Jokes – Theatre Company Geugdan ‡**; Heads With Hieroglyphic Hats – Theatre Company Dong; The Story of Wang Seogae – Theatre Company Baeda; Yoon Hye-suk (director) – Dry Land; Lee Yang-gu (writer) – Unavoidable Curtain, On Another Road	**Jeong Jin-sae (director and writer) – 2021 University Academic Proficiency Test Integrated Social Exploration Area ‡**; Ko Joo-young (planning) – Drama Practice 3 Playwriting Practice: Dying with a Fish; Kim Pung-nyeon (director and writer) – I Scratched My Knee and My Armpit was Sore; I'm Not Sorry If It Hurts – Theatre Company Dareunmomdeul; 2020 Daughters of Megalia – Theater Company Medusa
**Best Actor**	**Best Actress**
**Choi Soon-jin – We are (No) Jokes ‡**; Park Wan-kyu – Faust Ending; Ahn Byung-sik – XXL Leotard Anna Sui Hand Mirror; Lee Sang-hong – Tragedy of X	**Lee Bong-ryun – Hamlet ‡**; Kim Moon-hee – Heads With Hieroglyphic Hats; Kim Jong-eun – Painter; Jo Kyung-ran – We are (No) Jokes; Choi Hee-jin – Love Letter to Stalin

=== Special awards ===
Awards	Recipient
**Tiktok Popularity Award (Male)**	Kim Seon-ho
**Tiktok Popularity Award (Female)**	Seo Yea-ji

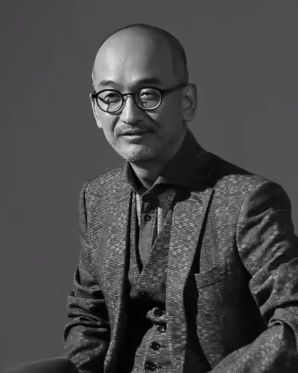
Lee Joon-ik, Grand Prize – Film winner

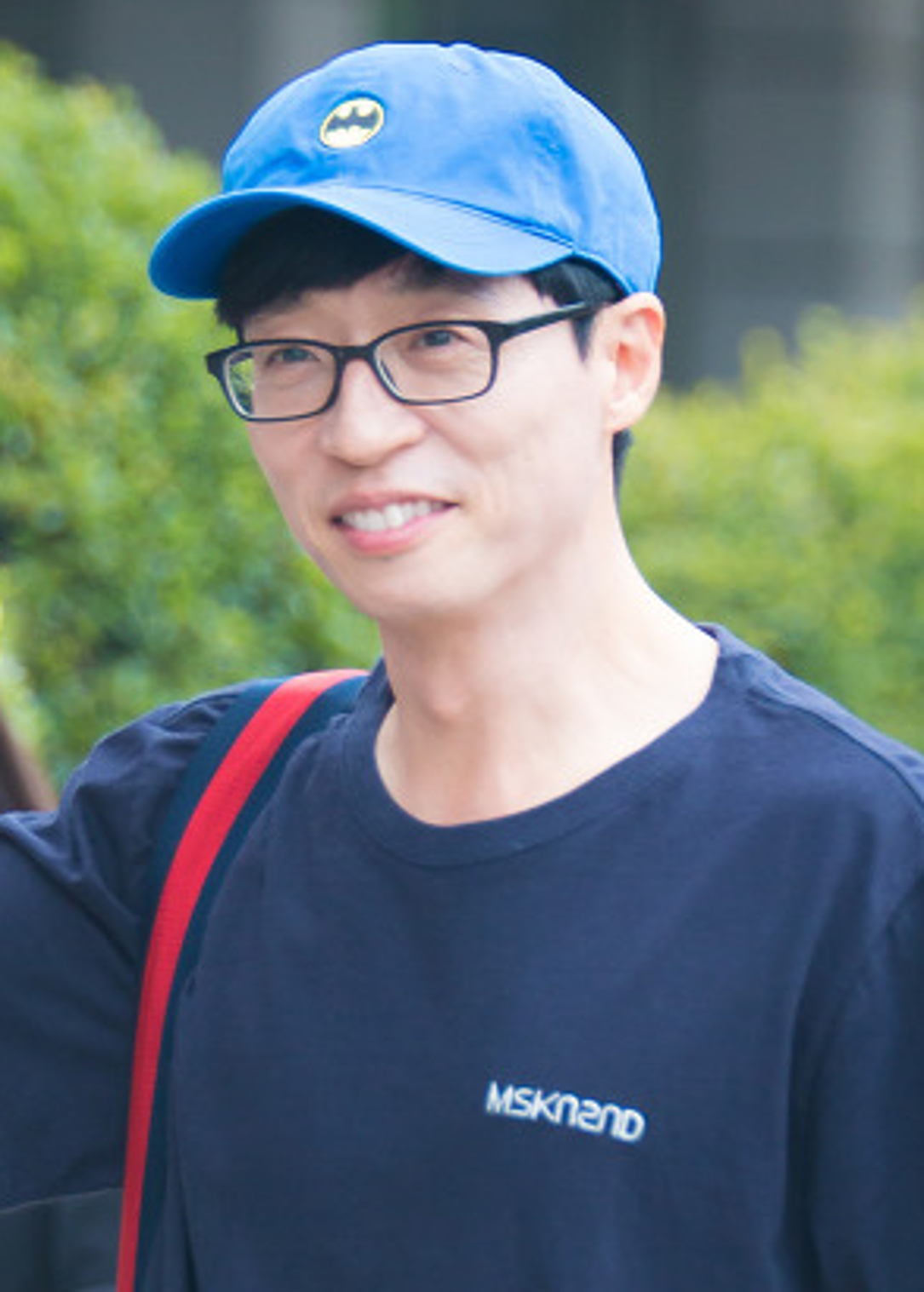
Yoo Jae-suk, Grand Prize – Television winner

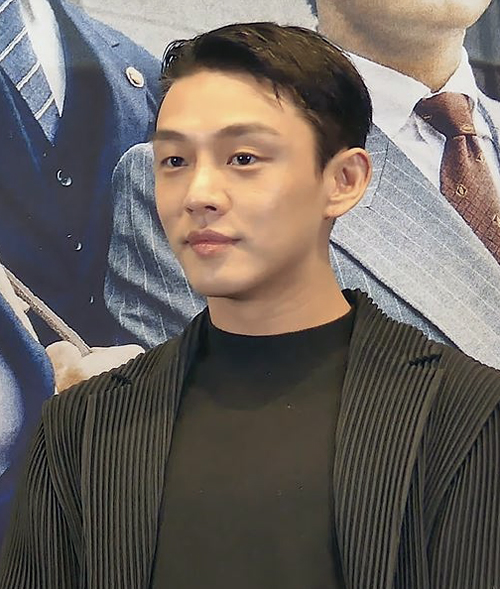
Yoo Ah-in, Best Actor – Film winner

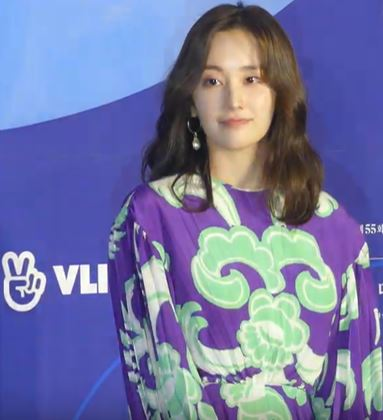
Jeon Jong-seo, Best Actress – Film winner

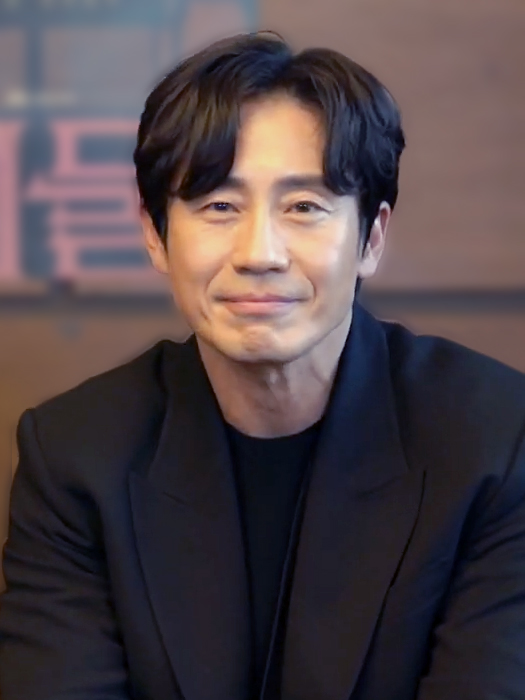
Shin Ha-kyun, Best Actor – Television winner

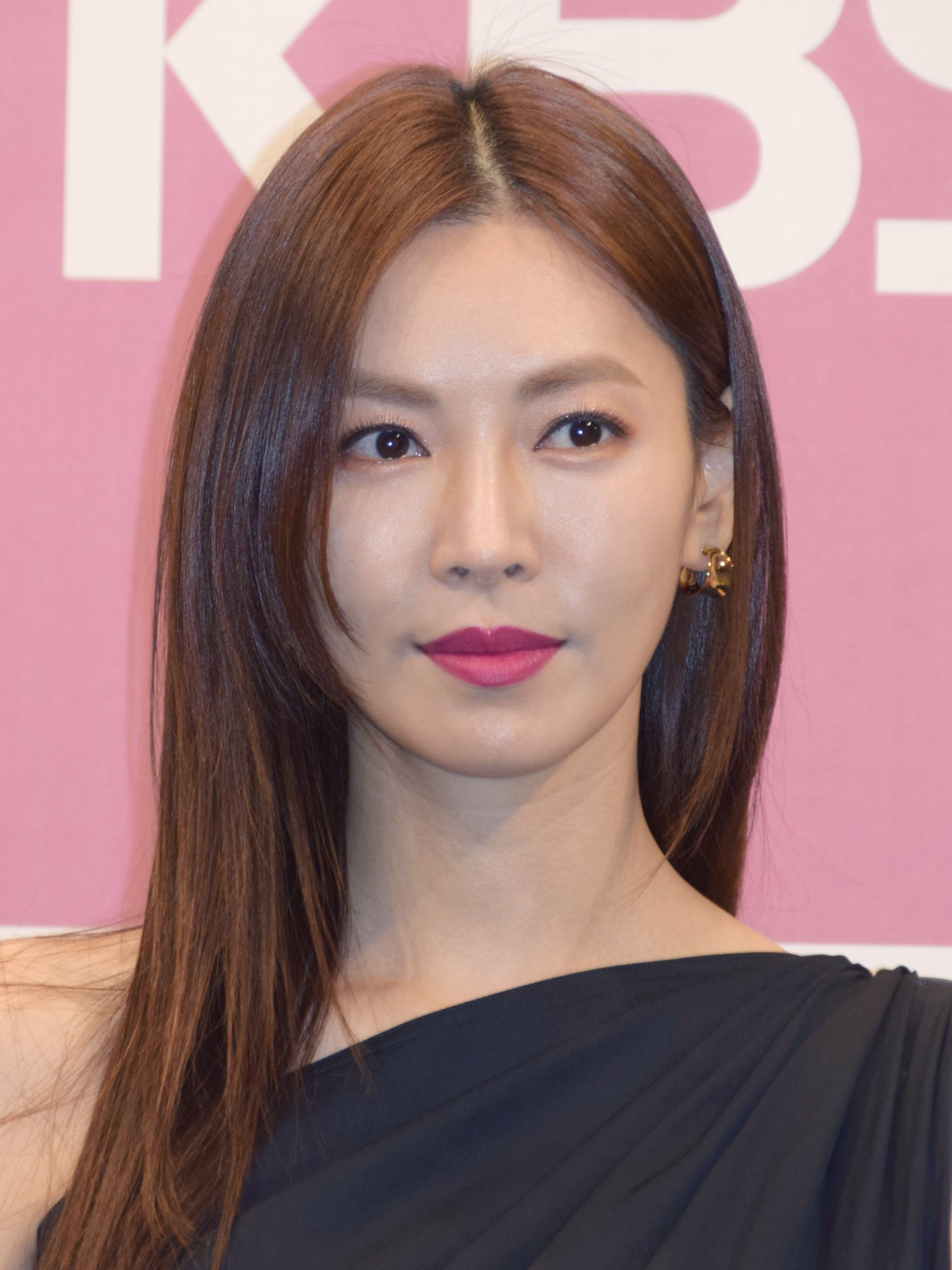
Kim So-yeon, Best Actress – Television winner

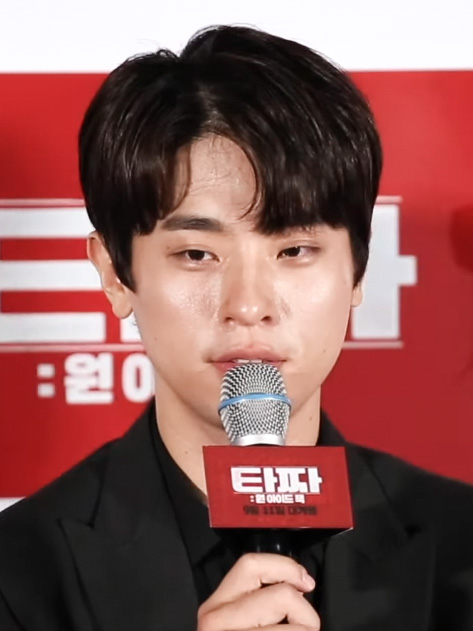
Park Jung-min, Best Supporting Actor – Film winner

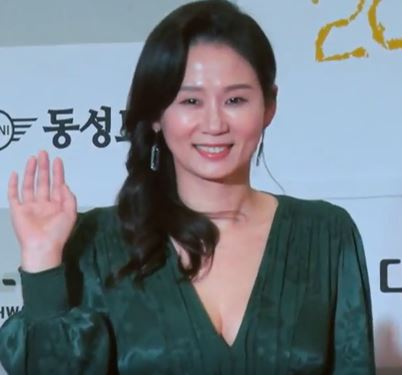
Kim Sun-young, Best Supporting Actress – Film winner

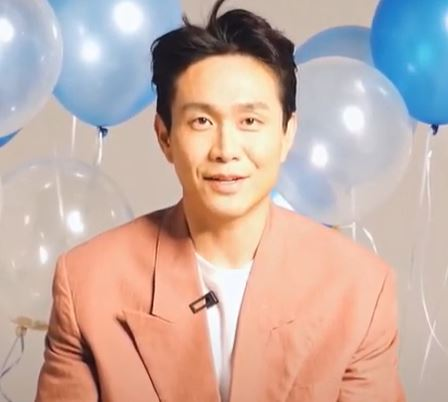
Oh Jung-se, Best Supporting Actor – Television winner

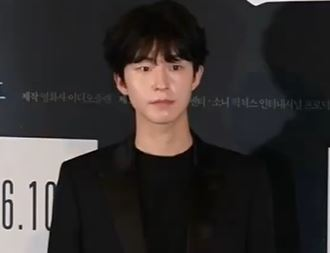
Hong Kyung, Best New Actor – Film winner

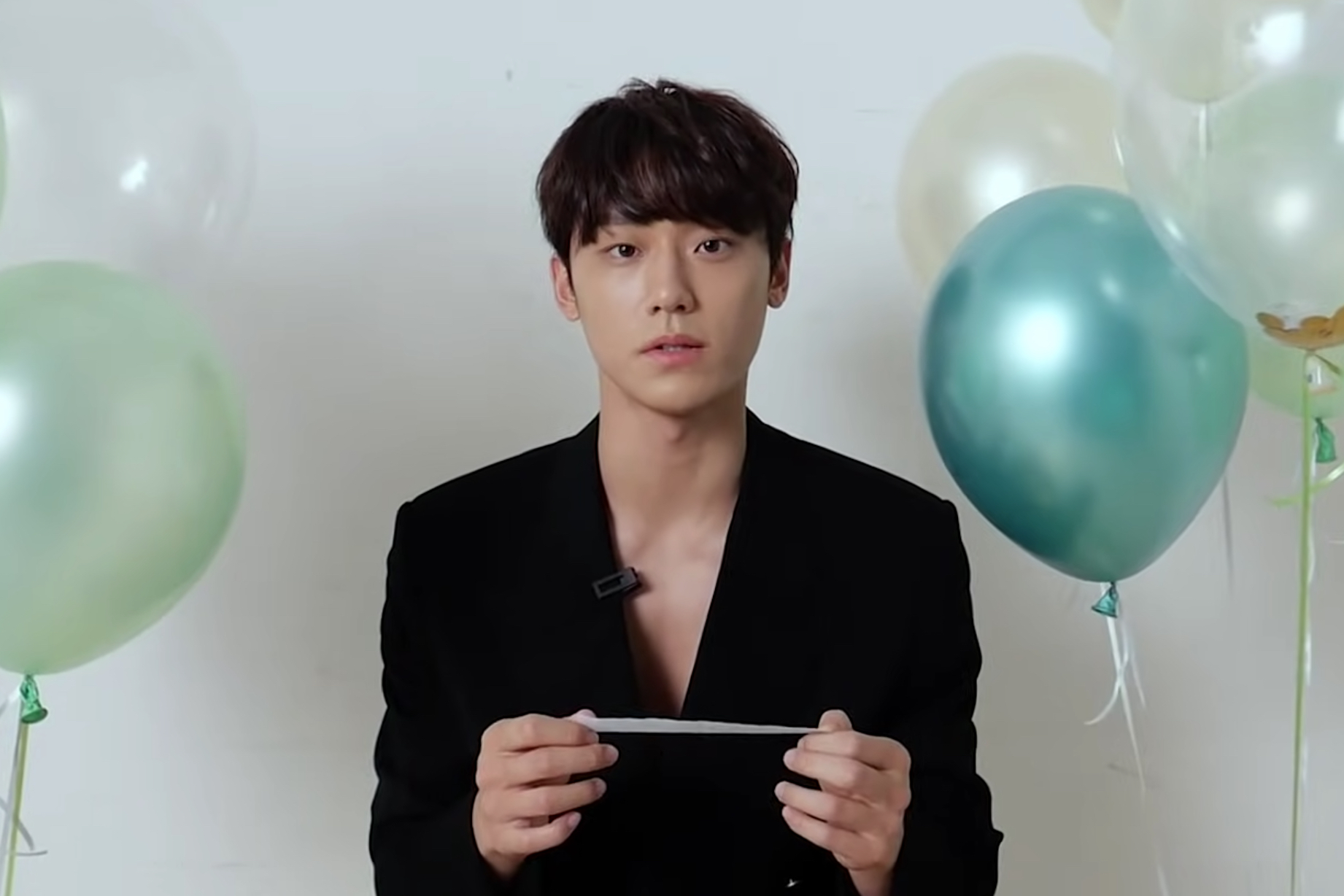
Lee Do-hyun, Best New Actor – Television winner

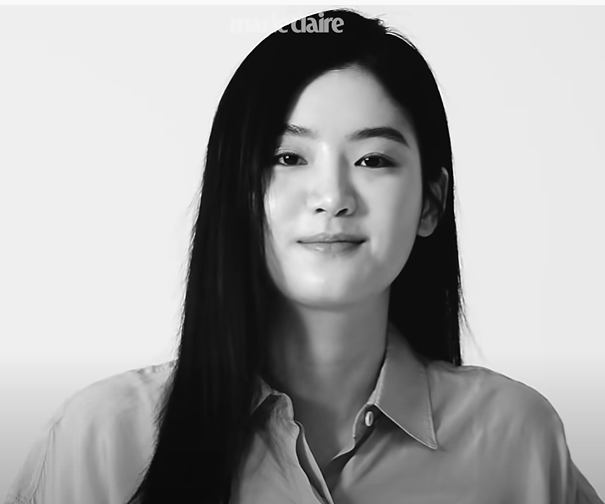
Park Ju-hyun, Best New Actress – Television winner

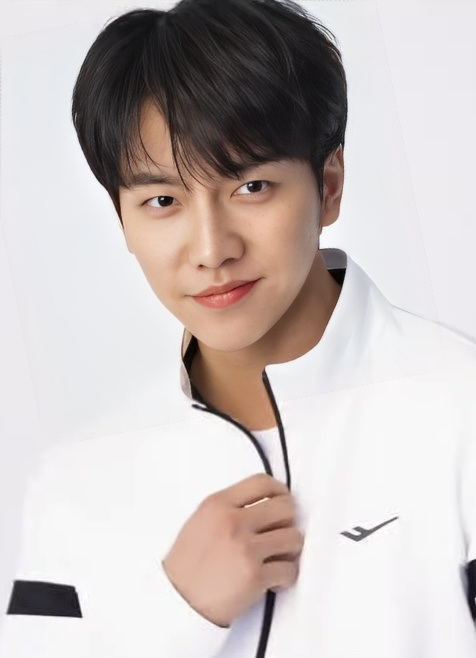
Lee Seung-gi, Best Male Variety Performer winner

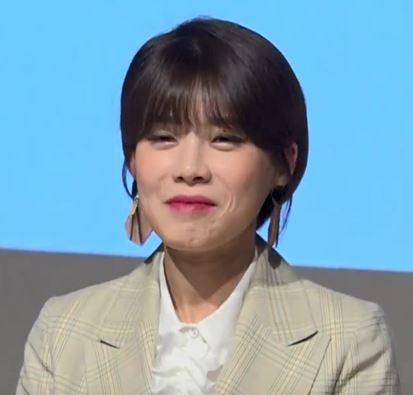
Jang Do-yeon, Best Female Variety Performer winner

== Presenters and performers ==
The following individuals, listed in order of appearance, presented awards or performed musical numbers.

=== Presenters ===
Name(s)	Role
Ahn Hyo-seop and Kim Da-mi	Presented awards for the Best New Actor – Television and Best New Actress – Television
Park Myung-hoon and Kang Mal-geum	Presented awards for the Best New Actor – Film, Best New Actress – Film and Best New Director – Film
Kim Ji-seok and Jung So-min	Presented awards for the Technical Award – Television and Technical Award – Film
Jung-woo and Oh Yeon-seo	Presented awards for the Best Screenplay – Television and Best Screenplay – Film
Kim Je-Hyung	Presented award for the Best Short Play
Oh Jung-se and Kim Sun-young	Presented awards for the Best Supporting Actor – Television and Best Supporting Actress – Television
Lee Kwang-soo and Kim Sae-byuk	Presented awards for the Best Supporting Actor – Film and Best Supporting Actress – Film
Lee Jun-ho and Lee Se-young	Presented awards for the Best Entertainment Program and Best Educational Show
Seo In-guk and Park Bo-young	Presented awards for the Best Director – Television and Best Director – Film
Jung Il-woo and Kwon Yu-ri	Presented Tiktok Popularity Awards for Most Popular Actor and Most Popular Actress
Yoo Jae-suk and Park Na-rae	Presented awards for the Best Male Variety Performer and Best Female Variety Performer
Baek Suk-gwang and Kim Jung	Presented awards for the Best Actor – Theatre and Best Actress – Theatre
Kang Ha-neul and Kim Hee-ae	Presented awards for the Best Actor – Television and Best Actress – Television
Lee Byung-hun and Jeon Do-yeon	Presented awards for the Best Actor – Film and Best Actress – Film
Shin Yoo-chung	Presented the Baeksang Play Award
Yoo Jae-myung and Han Ye-ri	Presented awards for the Best Drama and Best Film
Go Hyun-jung	Presented Grand Prize – Television
Jeongdo Hong and Bong Joon-ho	Presented Grand Prize – Film

=== Performers ===
Name(s)	Role	Performed
Choi Baek-ho and Lee Do-hyun	Performers	"Two Hands, to You (feat. Choi Baek-ho)" (두 손, 너에게 (Feat. 최백호))
