= Baeksang Arts Award for Best Drama =

South Korean annual television award

- Awarded for: Best South Korean series of the year
- Country: South Korea
- Presented by: Baeksang Arts Awards
- Most recent winner: You and Everything Else (2026)
- Website: baeksangartsawards

The Baeksang Arts Award for Best Drama (Korean: 백상예술대상 TV부문 드라마 작품상; RR: Baeksang Yesul Daesang TV Bumun Deurama Jakpumsang) is an award presented annually at the Baeksang Arts Awards ceremony organised by Ilgan Sports and JTBC Plus, affiliates of JoongAng Ilbo, usually in the second quarter of each year in Seoul.

== Winners and nominees ==
Table key
‡	Indicates the winner

=== 1970s ===
Year	Drama	Original title	Network
1975 (11th)	Chief Inspector ‡	수사반장	MBC
1976 (12th)	Tenacity ‡	집념	MBC
1977 (13th)	The Pilgrimage ‡	단편문학 순례	KBS
1978 (14th)	Couples ‡	부부	TBC
1979 (15th)	June 25 Special ‡	6.25특집극 7부작	KBS

=== 1980s ===
Year	Drama	Original title	Network
1980 (16th)	Korean ‡	한국인	MBC
1981 (17th)	Eulhwa ‡	을화	KBS
1982 (18th)	A Life-sized Buddha ‡	등신불	KBS
1983 (19th)	Winds of Change ‡	풍운	KBS
1984 (20th)	The Raging Sea ‡	불타는 바다	KBS
1984 (20th)	Bestseller Theater: Other People's Lives (episode) ‡	베스트셀러극장: 타인의 생애	MBC
1985 (21st)	The Country Diary ‡	전원일기	MBC
1986 (22nd)	Grass ‡	억새풀	MBC
1987 (23rd)	The Boil ‡	생인손	MBC
1988 (24th)	Love and Ambition ‡	사랑과 야망	MBC
1989 (25th)	Possessed Souls ‡	사로잡힌 영혼	KBS

=== 1990s ===
Year	Drama	Original title	Network
1990 (26th)	The Tree of Love ‡	사랑이 꽃피는 나무	KBS
1991 (27th)	The Second Republic ‡	제2공화국	MBC
1992 (28th)	Eyes of Dawn ‡	여명의 눈동자	MBC
1993 (29th)	Wind in the Grass ‡	억새바람	MBC
1994 (30th)	Sea of My Mother ‡	엄마의 바다	MBC
1995 (31st)	Sandglass ‡	모래시계	SBS
1996 (32nd)	Love Formula ‡	연애의 기초	MBC
1997 (33rd)	The Most Beautiful Goodbye ‡	세상에서 가장 아름다운 이별	MBC
1998 (34th)	Snail ‡	달팽이	SBS
1999 (35th)	When Time Flows ‡	흐르는 것이 세월뿐이랴	MBC

=== 2000s ===
Year	Drama	Original title	Network
2000 (36th)	Kuk-hee ‡	국희	MBC
2001 (37th)	Housewife's Rebellion ‡	아줌마	MBC
2002 (38th)	Piano ‡	피아노	SBS
2003 (39th)	Ruler of Your Own World ‡	네 멋대로 해라	MBC
2004 (40th)	More Beautiful Than a Flower ‡	꽃보다 아름다워	KBS
2005 (41st)	I'm Sorry, I Love You ‡	미안하다, 사랑한다	KBS
2005 (41st)	Bad Housewife	불량주부	SBS
2005 (41st)	Be Strong, Geum-soon!	굳세어라 금순아	MBC
2005 (41st)	Immortal Admiral Yi Sun-sin	불멸의 이순신	KBS
2005 (41st)	Ireland	아일랜드	MBC
2005 (41st)	Lovers in Paris	파리의 연인	SBS
2006 (42nd)	Toji, the Land ‡	토지	SBS
2006 (42nd)	Fashion 70s	패션 70s	SBS
2006 (42nd)	Golden Apple	황금사과	KBS
2006 (42nd)	My Lovely Sam Soon	내 이름은 김삼순	MBC
2006 (42nd)	My Rosy Life	장밋빛 인생	KBS
2007 (43rd)	Seoul 1945 ‡	서울 1945	KBS
2007 (43rd)	Alone in Love	연애시대	SBS
2007 (43rd)	Behind the White Tower	하얀 거탑	MBC
2007 (43rd)	Hwang Jini	황진이	KBS
2007 (43rd)	Jumong	주몽	MBC
2008 (44th)	War of Money ‡	쩐의 전쟁	SBS
2008 (44th)	Coffee Prince	커피프린스 1호점	MBC
2008 (44th)	The Legend	태왕사신기	MBC
2008 (44th)	Likeable or Not	미우나 고우나	KBS
2008 (44th)	My Husband's Woman	내 남자의 여자	SBS
2009 (45th)	Mom's Dead Upset ‡	엄마가 뿔났다	KBS
2009 (45th)	Beethoven Virus	베토벤 바이러스	MBC
2009 (45th)	Last Scandal	내 생애 마지막 스캔들	MBC
2009 (45th)	On Air	온에어	SBS
2009 (45th)	Painter of the Wind	바람의 화원	SBS

=== 2010s ===
Year	Drama	Original title	Network
2010 (46th)	Iris ‡	아이리스	KBS
2010 (46th)	Queen of Housewives	내조의 여왕	SBS
2010 (46th)	Brilliant Legacy	찬란한 유산	SBS
2010 (46th)	Queen Seondeok	선덕여왕	MBC
2010 (46th)	The Slave Hunters	추노	KBS
2011 (47th)	Secret Garden ‡	시크릿 가든	SBS
2011 (47th)	Dong Yi	동이	MBC
2011 (47th)	Giant	자이언트	SBS
2011 (47th)	Bread, Love and Dreams	제빵왕 김탁구	KBS
2011 (47th)	Sungkyunkwan Scandal	성균관 스캔들	KBS
2012 (48th)	Moon Embracing the Sun ‡	해를 품은 달	MBC
2012 (48th)	Brain	브레인	KBS
2012 (48th)	Deep Rooted Tree	뿌리 깊은 나무	SBS
2012 (48th)	The Greatest Love	최고의 사랑	MBC
2012 (48th)	The Princess' Man	공주의 남자	KBS
2013 (49th)	The Chaser ‡	추적자 더 체이서	SBS
2013 (49th)	Lights and Shadows	빛과 그림자	MBC
2013 (49th)	My Husband Got a Family	넝쿨째 굴러온 당신	KBS
2013 (49th)	School 2013	학교 2013	KBS
2013 (49th)	How Long I've Kissed	아내의 자격	JTBC
2014 (50th)	Good Doctor ‡	굿 닥터	KBS
2014 (50th)	I Can Hear Your Voice	너의 목소리가 들려	SBS
2014 (50th)	My Love from the Star	별에서 온 그대	SBS
2014 (50th)	Reply 1994	응답하라 1994	tvN
2014 (50th)	Secret Affair	밀회	JTBC
2015 (51st)	Heard It Through the Grapevine ‡	풍문으로 들었소	SBS
2015 (51st)	Kill Me, Heal Me	킬미, 힐미	MBC
2015 (51st)	Misaeng: Incomplete Life	미생 - 아직 살아 있지 못한 자	tvN
2015 (51st)	Punch	펀치	SBS
2015 (51st)	Steal Heart	유나의 거리	JTBC
2016 (52nd)	Signal ‡	시그널	tvN
2016 (52nd)	Descendants of the Sun	태양의 후예	KBS
2016 (52nd)	Reply 1988	응답하라	tvN
2016 (52nd)	She Was Pretty	그녀는 예뻤다	MBC
2016 (52nd)	Six Flying Dragons	육룡이 나르샤	SBS
2017 (53rd)	Dear My Friends ‡	디어 마이 프렌즈	tvN
2017 (53rd)	W	더블유	MBC
2017 (53rd)	Love in the Moonlight	구르미 그린 달빛	KBS
2017 (53rd)	Dr. Romantic	낭만닥터 김사부	SBS
2017 (53rd)	Guardian: The Lonely and Great God	쓸쓸하고 찬란하神 – 도깨비	tvN
2018 (54th)	Mother ‡	마더	tvN
2018 (54th)	Misty	미스티	JTBC
2018 (54th)	Stranger	비밀의 숲	tvN
2018 (54th)	Fight for My Way	쌈 마이웨이	KBS
2018 (54th)	My Golden Life	황금빛 내 인생	KBS
2019 (55th)	My Mister ‡	나의 아저씨	tvN
2019 (55th)	The Light in Your Eyes	눈이 부시게	JTBC
2019 (55th)	Mr. Sunshine	미스터 션샤인	tvN
2019 (55th)	Children of Nobody	붉은 달 푸른 해	MBC
2019 (55th)	Sky Castle	SKY 캐슬	JTBC

=== 2020s ===
Year	Drama	Original title	Network
2020 (56th)	Hot Stove League ‡	스토브리그	SBS
2020 (56th)	Crash Landing on You	사랑의 불시착	tvN
2020 (56th)	Hyena	하이에나	SBS
2020 (56th)	Kingdom	킹덤	Netflix
2020 (56th)	When the Camellia Blooms	동백꽃 필 무렵	KBS
2021 (57th)	Beyond Evil ‡	괴물	JTBC
2021 (57th)	It's Okay to Not Be Okay	사이코지만 괜찮아	tvN
2021 (57th)	Flower of Evil	악의 꽃	tvN
2021 (57th)	My Unfamiliar Family	(아는 건 별로 없지만) 가족입니다	tvN
2021 (57th)	Extracurricular	인간수업	Netflix
2022 (58th)	D.P. ‡	디피	Netflix
2022 (58th)	Squid Game	오징어 게임	Netflix
2022 (58th)	Twenty-Five Twenty-One	스물다섯 스물하나	tvN
2022 (58th)	The Red Sleeve	옷소매 붉은 끝동	MBC
2022 (58th)	Political Fever	이렇게 된 이상 청와대로 간다	Wavve
2023 (59th)	The Glory ‡	더 글로리	Netflix
2023 (59th)	My Liberation Notes	나의 해방일지	JTBC
2023 (59th)	Our Blues	우리들의 블루스	tvN
2023 (59th)	Extraordinary Attorney Woo	이상한 변호사 우영우	ENA
2023 (59th)	Little Women	작은 아씨들	tvN
2024 (60th)	My Dearest ‡	연인	MBC
2024 (60th)	The Good Bad Mother	나쁜엄마	JTBC
2024 (60th)	Moving	무빙	Disney+
2024 (60th)	Revenant	악귀	SBS
2024 (60th)	Daily Dose of Sunshine	정신병동에도 아침이 와요	Netflix
2025 (61st)	When Life Gives You Tangerines ‡	폭싹 속았수다	Netflix
2025 (61st)	Lovely Runner	선재 업고 튀어	tvN
2025 (61st)	The Tale of Lady Ok	옥씨부인전	JTBC
2025 (61st)	Doubt	이토록 친밀한 배신자	MBC
2025 (61st)	The Trauma Code: Heroes on Call	중증외상센터	Netflix
2026 (62nd)	You and Everything Else ‡	은중과 상연	Netflix
2026 (62nd)	Our Unwritten Seoul	미지의 서울	tvN
2026 (62nd)	The Dream Life of Mr. Kim	서울 자가에 대기업 다니는 김 부장 이야기	JTBC
2026 (62nd)	Low Life	파인: 촌뜨기들	Disney+
2026 (62nd)	Bon Appétit, Your Majesty	폭군의 셰프	tvN

== Sources ==
- "Baeksang Arts Awards Nominees and Winners Lists". Naver Movie (in Korean).
- "Baeksang Arts Awards Winners Lists". Baeksang Arts Awards (in Korean).
