= The Good Bad Mother =

2023 South Korean television series

- Promotional poster
- Hangul: 나쁜엄마
- Lit.: Bad Mom
- RR: Nappeuneomma
- MR: Nappŭnŏmma
- Genre: Family; Comedy drama; Slice-of-life
- Developed by: SLL (planning)
- Written by: Bae Se-young
- Directed by: Shim Na-yeon
- Starring: Ra Mi-ran; Lee Do-hyun; Ahn Eun-jin; Yoo In-soo
- Music by: Ha Geun-young
- Country of origin: South Korea
- Original language: Korean
- No. of episodes: 14

Production
- Executive producer: Kim So-jung
- Producers: Park Jun-seo; Park Cheol-soo
- Running time: 70–80 minutes
- Production companies: Drama House; SLL; Film Monster

Original release
- Network: JTBC
- Release: April 26 – June 8, 2023

The Good Bad Mother (Korean: 나쁜엄마; lit. 'Bad Mother') is a 2023 South Korean television series directed by Shim Na-yeon, and starring Ra Mi-ran, Lee Do-hyun, Ahn Eun-jin and Yoo In-soo. It aired from April 26 to June 8, 2023 on JTBC's Wednesdays and Thursdays at 22:30 (KST). It is also available for streaming on Netflix in selected regions.

The series was a commercial hit and became one of the highest-rated series in Korean cable television history. It also set a new record for the highest ratings achieved by any Wednesday–Thursday drama in JTBC history.

== Synopsis ==
A tragic accident leaves an ambitious prosecutor with the mind of a child and paraplegic, forcing him and his mother to embark on a journey to heal their relationship.

== Cast ==
=== Main ===
- Ra Mi-ran as Jin Young-soon: a single mother who runs a pig farm, and has lived a tenacious life to protect her child. It is revealed that she indoctrinates and push her son to success to avenge his father's death.
  - Kang Bo-kyung as teenage Jin Young-soon
- Lee Do-hyun as Choi Kang-ho: Young-soon's son who works as a prosecutor and has a cold-hearted personality. He suffers from amnesia after an unexpected accident and awakens with the mind of a child.
  - Lee Kyung-hoon as child Choi Kang-ho
  - Bae Jae-hyun as teenage Choi Kang-ho
- Ahn Eun-jin as Lee Mi-joo: a nail artist who is Kang-ho's old friend and ex-girlfriend.
  - Jeon Si-hyun as child Lee Mi-joo
- Yoo In-soo as Bang Sam-sik: the troublemaker of the village and thief. He has been in love with Mi-joo since childhood.
  - Kim Jun-hee as child Bang Sam-sik

=== Supporting ===
==== The Axis of Crimes ====
- Choi Moo-sung as Song Woo-byeok: CEO of Woobyeok Group and the main antagonist of the series. He is responsible for Kang-ho's father death.
- Jung Woong-in as Oh Tae-soo: a former prosecutor and member of the National Assembly.
- Hong Bi-ra as Oh Ha-yeong: Tae-soo's only daughter and Kang-ho's fiancée.
- Choi Soon-jin as Manager So Ji-seok: Woo-byeok's employee.
- Park Cheon as Assistant Manager Cha Seung-eon: Woo-byeok's employee.

==== People in Jowoo-ri ====
- Kim Won-hae as Son Yong-rak: the head of his village.
- Park Bo-kyung as the wife of Son Yong-rak.
- Kang Mal-geum as Jung Gum-ja: Mi-joo's mother.
- Seo Yi-sook as Park Sung-ae: Sam-sik's mother who runs a mill with her husband.
- Jang Won-young as Mr. Bang: Sam-sik's father and mill owner.
- Lee Sang-hoon as Mr. Yang: He is involved in many fields in Jowoo-ri, such as brewery owner, shaman flower fairy, real estate, and boarding house owner.
- Park Da-on as Seo-jin: Kang-ho and Mi-joo's son and Ye-jin's twin brother.
- Ki So-yu as Ye-jin: Kang-ho and Mi-joo's daughter and Seo-jin's twin sister.
- Baek Hyun-jin as Trot Baek / Baek Hoon-ah: a composer who was forced to return to his hometown after being involved in various issues.

==== Extended ====
- Joshua Newton as Andrea: a foreign part-time worker on Young-soon's farm.
- Oh Ha-nee as Seon-yung: Mi-joo's nail art partner.
- Kim Seon-bin as Kang-ho's classmate at the Judicial Research and Training Institute.
- Nam Mi-jung as Sun-young's mother.
- Kim Ji-woong as Lee Ji-woong: Ha-yeong's fiancé.
- Ki Eun-se as Hwang Soo-hyun: Tae-soo's secretary.
- Sung Nak-kyung as Cho Young-jae: the owner of the raw fish restaurant.
- Kim Yong-jun as Kang-ho's investigator when he was a prosecutor.
- Lee Gyu-hoe as Bae Seon-jang: a gambling house boss.
- Jo Young-gyu as Woo-byeok's lawyer.

=== Special appearances ===
- Cho Jin-woong as Choi Hae-sik, Young-soon's late husband.
- Shin Seung-ho as a civil servant in the livestock division.
- Seo Dong-hyun as wedding photographer.
- Ryu Seung-ryong as a tailor.
- Lee Ah-jin as Kang-ho's blind date.

== Reception ==
=== Viewership ===
The Good Bad Mother : South Korea viewers per episode (millions)

Season	Episode number														Average
Season	1	2	3	4	5	6	7	8	9	10	11	12	13	14	Average
1	0.779	0.934	1.156	1.415	1.378	1.588	1.568	1.837	1.946	2.123	2.132	2.396	2.277	2.669	1.728

Source: Audience measurement performed nationwide by Nielsen Korea.

Average TV viewership ratings
Ep.	Original broadcast date	Average audience share (Nielsen Korea)	
Ep.	Original broadcast date	Nationwide	Seoul
1	April 26, 2023	3.588% (3rd)	4.166% (1st)
2	April 27, 2023	4.310% (4th)	4.836% (3rd)
3	May 3, 2023	5.706% (1st)	6.428% (1st)
4	May 4, 2023	7.033% (1st)	7.596% (1st)
5	May 10, 2023	6.670% (1st)	6.666% (1st)
6	May 11, 2023	7.701% (2nd)	8.056% (1st)
7	May 17, 2023	7.494% (1st)	8.153% (1st)
8	May 18, 2023	8.446% (1st)	9.526% (1st)
9	May 24, 2023	9.439% (1st)	9.604% (1st)
10	May 25, 2023	9.956% (1st)	10.553% (1st)
11	May 31, 2023	10.257% (1st)	10.648% (1st)
12	June 1, 2023	10.998% (1st)	12.339% (1st)
13	June 7, 2023	10.592% (1st)	11.097% (1st)
14	June 8, 2023	12.032% (1st)	13.604% (1st)
Average		8.159%	8.805%
In the table above, the blue numbers represent the lowest ratings and the red numbers represent the highest ratings.; This series aired on a cable channel/pay TV which normally has a relatively smaller audience compared to free-to-air TV/public broadcasters (KBS, SBS, MBC and EBS).

=== Accolades ===
Award ceremony	Year	Category	Nominee / Work	Result	Ref.
Baeksang Arts Awards	2024	Best Drama	The Good Bad Mother	Nominated	
Baeksang Arts Awards	2024	Best Actress	Ra Mi-ran	Nominated	
Baeksang Arts Awards	2024	Best Supporting Actress	Kang Mal-geum	Nominated	
Baeksang Arts Awards	2024	Best Screenplay	Bae Se-young	Nominated	

==== Listicle ====
Publisher	Year	Listicle	Placement	Ref.
Time	2023	The 10 Best Korean Dramas of 2023 on Netflix	Included	
