= 60th Baeksang Arts Awards =

2024 edition of award ceremony

- Official poster
- Date: May 7, 2024
- Site: COEX Hall D, Seoul
- Hosted by: Shin Dong-yup; Bae Suzy; Park Bo-gum
- Official website: www.baeksangawards.co.kr

Highlights
- Grand Prize: Film: Kim Sung-su (12.12: The Day); Television: Moving
- Most awards: Film: Exhuma (4); Television: Moving (3)
- Most nominations: Film: Exhuma (8); Television: Moving (7)

Television coverage
- Network: JTBC
- Duration: 220 minutes
- Ratings: 2.807% (Nielsen Korea)

The 60th Baeksang Arts Awards (Korean: 제60회 백상예술대상) ceremony was held at COEX, Seoul on May 7, 2024, at 17:00 (KST). The show was hosted by Shin Dong-yup, Bae Suzy, and Park Bo-gum. It was broadcast live simultaneously in South Korea on JTBC channels and internationally on Prizm. As one of South Korea's most prestigious entertainment honors, the ceremony recognized excellence in film, television, and theatre through a screening process involving 60 professional evaluators and industry experts. The nominees were announced on April 8, 2024, via its official website. All works released from April 1, 2023 to March 31, 2024, were eligible for nominations. The ceremony was noted for highlighting a recovery in the domestic film industry and the intensifying competition between traditional broadcasters and global OTT platforms.

In the Film Division, the historical drama 12.12: The Day emerged as the primary winner, securing the Grand Prize for director Kim Sung-su and Best Film. The jury credited the film's success with contributing to the post-pandemic recovery of the domestic film industry by prioritizing a theatrical release. Hwang Jung-min (12.12: The Day) won Best Actor following a competitive five-round deliberation, while Kim Go-eun was awarded Best Actress for Exhuma by a unanimous decision. The directing and technical categories also highlighted a trend toward blending genre elements with nationalistic themes, as seen in the awards for Exhuma director Jang Jae-hyun and sound designer Kim Byung-in.

The Television Division highlighted the ongoing competition between broadcasters and OTT. The Disney+ original series Moving received the Grand Prize, marking the first time the platform secured the ceremony's top honor. The series won four awards in total, including Best Screenplay for Kang Full. MBC maintained a significant presence for legacy media, winning Best Drama for My Dearest and sweeping the Best Actor and Best Actress categories with Namkoong Min and Lee Hanee. Additionally, the division reflected the growing influence of web-based content by honoring creators Na Yeong-seok and Hong Jin-kyung in the variety categories for their cross-platform impact.

The Theater Division emphasized "artistic excellence" through a year-long live evaluation process that prioritized in-person attendance over video screenings. The Baeksang Theater was granted to the theater company Miin for the production To My Son (Subtitle: Miok Alice Hyeon), which also earned Kang Hae-jin the Best Acting award for her lead performance. Director Lee Cheol-hee was recognized with the Best Newcomer for A New Movement in an Old Tradition – Blind, with judges citing his ability to maximize the technical and inherent strengths of the stage medium. The ceremony concluded by acknowledging the evolving nature of media consumption and the need for diverse evaluation criteria across all three divisions.

== Winners and nominees ==
Winners are listed first and highlighted in boldface. Nominees are listed per official website.

=== Film ===
The film division of the 60th Baeksang Arts Awards, covering Korean feature films released between April 1, 2023, and March 31, 2024, was characterized as a significant "revival" for the industry following a period of stagnation. The Grand Prize (Daesang) was awarded to Director Kim Sung-su for the historical drama 12.12: The Day. The judging panel reached a unanimous decision, citing Kim's 30-year career and his commitment to a theatrical release during a period of industry downturn. 12.12: The Day also won Best Film receiving six votes over Exhuma. Judges noted the production's high completion quality and the "bold decision-making" required for its distribution process.

In the directing and screenwriting categories, Jang Jae-hyun received Best Director for Exhuma, with the committee highlighting the film's unique energy and its ability to integrate nationalistic themes into the occult genre. Lee Jung-hong was awarded Best New Director for A Wild Roomer, receiving five votes in the first round of deliberation. The Best Screenplay award went to Jason Yu for Sleep; the script was recommended by all seven judges in the initial round for its efficient use of limited space.

The acting categories involved significant deliberation. Hwang Jung-min won Best Actor for 12.12: The Day by a single vote over Lee Byung-hun (Concrete Utopia) after five rounds of voting. The jury focused on Hwang's ability to reinterpret a historical figure into a distinct character. In contrast, Kim Go-eun was selected for Best Actress for Exhuma by a unanimous vote conducted in 30 seconds. Kim Jong-soo (Smugglers) won Best Supporting Actor with four votes, while Lee Sang-hee (My Name is Loh Kiwan) secured Best Supporting Actress following a tie-break. Lee Do-hyun (Exhuma) and Kim Hyeong-seo (Hopeless) were named Best New Actor and Best New Actress, respectively. The Best Technical Achievement was given to Kim Byung-in for the sound design of Exhuma, and the Gucci Impact Award was awarded to The Dream Songs.

Film category
**Grand Prize**
**Kim Sung-su (director) – 12.12: The Day**
**Best Film**	**Best Director**
**12.12: The Day**; Cobweb; Noryang: Deadly Sea; Concrete Utopia; Exhuma	**Jang Jae-hyun – Exhuma**; Kim Sung-su – 12.12: The Day; Kim Han-min – Noryang: Deadly Sea; Ryoo Seung-wan – Smugglers; Um Tae-hwa – Concrete Utopia
**Best New Director**	**Best Actor**
**Lee Jung-hong – A Wild Roomer**; Kim Chang-hoon – Hopeless; Park Young-ju – Citizen of a Kind; Jason Yu – Sleep; Cho Hyun-chul – The Dream Songs	**Hwang Jung-min – 12.12: The Day as Chun Doo-gwang**; Kim Yoon-seok – Noryang: Deadly Sea as Yi Sun-sin; Lee Byung-hun – Concrete Utopia as Yeong-tak; Jung Woo-sung – 12.12: The Day as Lee Tae-shin; Choi Min-sik – Exhuma as Kim Sang-deok
**Best Actress**	**Best Supporting Actor**
**Kim Go-eun – Exhuma as Lee Hwa-rim**; Ra Mi-ran – Citizen of a Kind as Kim Deok-hee; Yum Jung-ah – Smugglers as Um Jin-sook; Lee Hanee – Killing Romance as Hwang Yeo-rae; Jung Yu-mi – Sleep as Soo-jin	**Kim Jong-soo – Smugglers as Lee Jang-сhun**; Park Geun-hyung – Picnic as Jeong Tae-ho; Park Jeong-min – Smugglers as Jang Do-ri; Song Joong-ki – Hopeless as Chi-geon; Yoo Hae-jin – Exhuma as Yeong-geun
**Best Supporting Actress**	**Best New Actor**
**Lee Sang-hee – My Name Is Loh Kiwan as Seon-ju**; Kim Sun-young – Concrete Utopia as Geum-ae; Yum Jung-ah – Alienoid: Return to the Future as Heug-seol; Yeom Hye-ran – Citizen of a Kind as Bong-rim; Krystal Jung – Cobweb as Han Yu-rim	**Lee Do-hyun – Exhuma as Bong-gil**; Kim Seon-ho – The Childe as Nobleman; Kim Young-sung – Big Sleep as Ki-young; Joo Jong-hyuk – Iron Mask as Kim Jae-woo; Hong Xa-bin – Hopeless as Yeon-gyu
**Best New Actress**	**Best Screenplay**
**Kim Hyeong-seo – Hopeless as Hayan**; Go Min-si – Smugglers as Go Ok-bun; Moon Seung-ah – The Hill of Secrets as Myeong-eun; Oh Woo-ri – Hail to Hell as Na-mi; Lim Sun-woo – Ms. Apocalypse as Yoo-jin	**Jason Yu – Sleep**; Park Jung-ye – Killing Romance; Lee Ji-eun – The Hill of Secrets; Jang Jae-hyun – Exhuma; Hong In-pyo, Hong Won-chan, Lee Young-jong, Kim Sung-su – 12.12: The Day
**Best Technical Achievement**	**Gucci Impact Award**
**Kim Byung-in (Sound) – Exhuma**; Lee Mo-gae (Cinematography) – 12.12: The Day; Jung Yi-jin (Art direction) – Cobweb; Jin Jong-hyun (VFX) – The Moon; Hwang Hyo-gyun (SFX make-up) – 12.12: The Day	**The Dream Songs**; Greenhouse; The Hill of Secrets; Ms. Apocalypse; Citizen of a Kind

==== Films with multiple nominations ====
The following films received multiple nominations:

Nominations	Films
8	Exhuma
7	12.12: The Day
5	Smugglers
4	Citizen of a Kind
4	Concrete Utopia
4	Hopeless
3	Cobweb
3	Noryang: Deadly Sea
3	Sleep
3	The Hill of Secrets
2	Killing Romance
2	Ms. Apocalypse
2	The Dream Songs

==== Films with multiple awards ====
The following films received multiple awards:

Wins	Films
4	Exhuma
3	12.12: The Day

=== Television ===
The television division of the 60th Baeksang Arts Awards evaluated content across terrestrial, cable, and OTT platforms released between April 1, 2023, and March 31, 2024. The selection process incorporated a preliminary survey of 30 industry experts, followed by three rounds of deliberation by a seven-member judging panel. The Grand Prize (Daesang) was awarded to the Disney+ original series Moving. In the second round of voting, the series received four votes, surpassing wildlife cinematographers Kim Dong-sik and Im Wan-ho (Whales and I) and entertainer Yoo Jae-suk. The jury cited the work's "Korean-style hero narrative" and its thematic exploration of how human ideology impacts the individual as primary factors for the win. Moving secured a total of four awards, including Best Screenplay for Kang Full, who was noted for his successful transition from webtoon author to scriptwriter, and Best New Actor for Lee Jung-ha.

The category for Best Drama was awarded to MBC's My Dearest, which received four votes over The Good Bad Mother and Revenant. The panel highlighted the series' reinterpretation of the Qing invasion of Joseon through a romantic lens. Best Director resulted in one of the most competitive votes of the ceremony; Han Dong-wook (The Worst of Evil) won by a single-vote margin over Lee Myoungwoo (Boyhood) following a final tie-breaker. Judges noted Han's ability to execute a stylized genre piece that avoided conventional character tropes. In the acting categories, Namkoong Min (My Dearest) won Best Actor after maintaining a lead through three rounds of voting, while Lee Hanee (Knight Flower) secured Best Actress following a final tie-break against Ra Mi-ran and Uhm Jung-hwa. The jury specifically cited Lee's technical range in portraying a character's dual identity.

The Best Variety Show category focused on a debate between "originality" and "broad popularity". MBC's Adventure By Accident 2 won the Best Entertainment Program award by a single vote over the Wavve original The Community. While the latter was praised for its social experimentation, the majority of the panel favored the former for its successful serialization and public appeal. For Best Variety Performer, Na Yeong-seok and Hong Jin-kyung were selected. The jury highlighted Na's role in shifting the variety paradigm toward a creator-based model via his YouTube channel, Channel Fullmoon, while Hong was recognized for her consistent presence across both legacy media and web platforms.

In the supporting and newcomer categories, Ahn Jae-hong and Yeom Hye-ran both won for their performances in the Netflix series Mask Girl. Ahn was recognized for his transformative character work, receiving four votes, while Yeom was praised for anchoring the series' two-part structure. The Best New Actress award was given to Jeon Yu-na (The Kidnapping Day) after a final round of deliberation where she received three votes, surpassing Kim Hyeong-seo and Go Youn-jung. For the Best Educational Show, the jury selected the KBS documentary Japanese Person Ozawa, noting its focus on labor rights and the dignity of survival as a return to the fundamental virtues of the documentary genre. The Best Technical Achievement was granted to Kim Dong-sik and Im Wan-ho for their underwater cinematography in Whale and I, marking a rare instance of the award focusing on the specialized field of documentary filming.

Television category
**Grand Prize**
**Moving (drama) (Disney+)**; Kim Dong-shik, Im Wan-ho (cinematography) – Whales and I (SBS); Yoo Jae-suk (variety performer)
**Best Drama**	**Best Entertainment Program**
**My Dearest (MBC)**; The Good Bad Mother (JTBC); Moving (Disney+); Revenant (SBS); Daily Dose of Sunshine (Netflix)	**Adventure By Accident 2 (MBC)**; I Am Solo (SBS Plus, ENA); The Community (Wavve); A Clean Sweep (JTBC); Pinggyego (DdeunDdeun)
**Best Educational Show**	**Best Director**
**Japanese Person Ozawa (KBS 1TV)**; Whales and I (SBS); Population Planning – Ultra-Low Birth Rate (EBS 1TV); There Is No Sustainable Earth (KBS 1TV); 1980, Lochon and Chauvel (KBS 1TV)	**Han Dong-wook – The Worst of Evil**; Park In-je – Moving; Lee Myoungwoo – Boyhood; Lee Chang-hee – A Killer Paradox; Jung Ji-hyun – Lies Hidden in My Garden
**Best Actor**	**Best Actress**
**Namkoong Min – My Dearest as Lee Jang-hyun**; Kim Soo-hyun – Queen of Tears as Baek Hyun-woo; Ryu Seung-ryong – Moving as Jang Ju-won; Yoo Yeon-seok – A Bloody Lucky Day as Geum Hyeok-soo; Yim Si-wan – Boyhood as Jang Byeong-tae	**Lee Hanee – Knight Flower as Jo Yeo-hwa**; Ra Mi-ran – The Good Bad Mother as Jin Young-soon; Ahn Eun-jin – My Dearest as Yoo Gil-chae; Uhm Jung-hwa – Doctor Cha as Cha Jeong-suk; Lim Ji-yeon – Lies Hidden in My Garden as Chu Sang-eun
**Best Supporting Actor**	**Best Supporting Actress**
**Ahn Jae-hong – Mask Girl as Joo Oh-nam**; Ryu Kyung-soo – The Bequeathed as Kim Young-ho; Lee Yi-kyung – Marry My Husband as Park Min-hwan; Lee Hee-joon – A Killer Paradox as Song Chon; Ji Seung-hyun – Korea–Khitan War as Yang Gyu	**Yeom Hye-ran – Mask Girl as Kim Kyung-ja**; Kang Mal-geum – The Good Bad Mother as Jung Gum-ja; Shin Dong-mi – Welcome to Samdal-ri as Cho Jin-dal; Lee Jung-eun – A Bloody Lucky Day as Hwang Soon-kyu; Joo Min-kyung – Behind Your Touch as Bae Ok-hee
**Best New Actor**	**Best New Actress**
**Lee Jung-ha – Moving as Kim Bong-seok**; Kim Yo-han – A Killer Paradox as Roh Bin; Lee Si-woo – Boyhood as Jeong Gyeong-tae; Lee Shin-ki – The Worst of Evil as Seo Jong-ryeol; Lee Jong-won – Knight Flower as Park Soo-ho	**Jeon Yu-na – The Kidnapping Day as Choi Ro-hee**; Go Youn-jung – Moving as Jang Hui-soo; Kim Hyeong-seo – The Worst of Evil as Lee Hae-ryeon; Lee Yi-dam – Daily Dose of Sunshine as Min Deul-re; Lee Han-byeol – Mask Girl as Kim Mo-mi
**Best Male Variety Performer**	**Best Female Variety Performer**
**Na Yeong-seok**; Kian84; Yoo Jae-suk; Calm Down Man; Tak Jae-hoon	**Hong Jin-kyung**; Kim Sook; An Yu-jin; Lee Soo-ji; Jang Do-yeon
**Best Screenplay**	**Best Technical Achievement**
**Kang Full – Moving**; Kim Eun-hee – Revenant; Bae Se-young – The Good Bad Mother; Lee Nam-gyu, Oh Bo-hyun, Kim Da-hee – Daily Dose of Sunshine; Lim Dae-hyung, Jeon Go-woon – LTNS	**Kim Dong-shik, Im Wan-ho (Cinematography) – Whales and I**; Yang Ho-sam, Park Ji-won (Art direction) – Revenant; Lee Seok-geun (Costume design) – Korea–Khitan War; Lee Sung-kyu (VFX) – Moving; Ha Ji-hee (Art direction) – The Matchmakers

==== Television programs with multiple nominations ====
The following television programs received multiple nominations:

Nominations	Television programs
7	Moving
4	The Good Bad Mother
3	A Killer Paradox
3	Boyhood
3	Daily Dose of Sunshine
3	Mask Girl
3	My Dearest
3	Revenant
3	The Worst of Evil
2	A Bloody Lucky Day
2	Knight Flower
2	Korea–Khitan War
2	Lies Hidden in My Garden
2	Whales and I

==== Television programs with multiple awards ====
The following television programs received multiple awards:

Wins	Television programs
3	Moving
2	Mask Girl
2	My Dearest

=== Theater ===
The theater division of the 60th Baeksang Arts Awards evaluated stage productions held between April 1, 2023, and March 31, 2024. To ensure the integrity of the live medium, the jury conducted a year-long evaluation process, prioritizing in-person attendance over video screenings to assess artistic excellence and contemporary relevance. The Baeksang Theater Award, the division's highest honor, was awarded to the theater company Miin for the production To My Son (Subtitle: Miok Alice Hyeon). Following a deliberation between Miin and director Kim Poong-nyun (The Art of Fighting), the jury reached a unanimous decision in favor of Miin, citing the production's advanced performance aesthetics and contemporary reality.

The Best Acting award was awarded to Kang Hae-jin for her performance in To My Son (Subtitle: Miok Alice Hyeon). The jury selected Kang from a pool of five nominees, noting her ability to lead a production through traditional acting strengths while providing an interpretation that expanded the work's thematic meaning without repeating established styles. The Best Newcomer, which recognizes original and developmental attempts in the field, was granted to director Lee Cheol-hee for A New Movement in an Old Tradition – Blind. The selection followed a debate regarding whether the category should be limited to theater troupes or remain open to individual creators; the panel ultimately chose Lee for his capacity to maximize the technical strengths of the theatrical medium.

Theater category
**Baeksang Theater**
**Miin (theater) – To My Son (Subtitle: Miok Alice Hyeon)**; Park Company (production) – Waiting for Godot; Kim Poong-nyun (director) – The Art of Fighting; Sansuyu (theater) – Forest; Cheongnyeondan (production) – Cost of Living
**Best Acting**	**Best Newcomer**
**Kang Hae-jin (actress) – To My Son (Subtitle: Miok Alice Hyeon)**; Kim Yong-jun (actor) – Cost of Living; Kim Eun-seok (actor) – A New Movement in an Old Tradition – Blind; Lee Mi-sook (actress) – The Art of Fighting; Lee Ji-hye (actress) – Can I Forgive Her	**Lee Cheol-hee (director) – A New Movement in an Old Tradition – Blind**; Shinsegae (theater) – Real Estate of Superman; Shin Jin-ho (director) – When Disaster Occurs on the Moon; Yangson (theater) – Blue Bird; Lee Dae-woong (director) – The Two Gentlemen of Verona

=== Special awards ===
The voting for the Prizm Popularity Award was held from April 25, at 12:00 (KST) to May 4, at 14:00 KST via Prizm app.

Awards	Recipient
**Prizm Popularity Award – Male**	Kim Soo-hyun
**Prizm Popularity Award – Female**	An Yu-jin

== Presenters and performers ==
The following individuals and teams, listed in order of appearance, presented awards or performed musical numbers.

Presenters
Name(s)	Role
Moon Sang-min; Roh Yoon-seo	Presented the awards for Best New Actress – Television, Best New Actor – Television, and Best Newcomer
Jang Dong-yoon (Note: Jinyoung was unable to attend the ceremony due to his military enlistment; he was represented by agency colleague Jang Dong-yoon.); Kim Si-eun	Presented the awards for Best New Director – Film, Best New Actress – Film, and Best New Actor – Film
Kim Mu-yeol; Park Ji-hwan	Presented the awards for Prizm Popularity Award – Male and Prizm Popularity Award – Female
Jang Ki-yong; Chun Woo-hee	Presented the awards for Best Techinal Achievement – Television, Best Technical Achievement – Film, Best Screenplay – Television, and Best Screenplay – Film
Kim Shin-rok; Kim Si-eun	Presented the award for Gucci Impact Award
Ha Ji-seong	Presented the award for Best Acting
Jo Woo-jin; Lim Ji-yeon	Presented the awards for Best Supporting Actor – Television and Best Supporting Actress – Television
Byun Yo-han; Park Se-wan	Presented the awards for Best Supporting Actor – Film and Best Supporting Actress – Film
Kim Min-su; Jung Jae-hyun; Lee Yong-ju	Presented the awards for Best Educational Show and Best Entertainment Program
Kim Jong-kook; Lee Eun-ji	Presented the awards for Best Male Variety Performer and Best Female Variety Performer
Lee Jun-ho	Presented the awards for Best Director – Television and Best Director – Film
Gil Hae-yeon	Presented the award for Baeksang Theater
Shin Ha-kyun; Lee Min-jung	Presented the awards for Best Drama and Best Film
Lee Sung-min; Song Hye-kyo	Presented the awards for Best Actor – Television and Best Actress – Television
Tang Wei	Presented the award for Best Actress – Film
Ryu Jun-yeol	Presented the award for Best Actor – Film
Park Chan-wook	Presented the award for Grand Prize Film
Jeongdo Hong; Park Eun-bin	Presented the award for Grand Prize – Television

Performers
Name(s)	Role	Performance
Lee Byung-hun	Narrator	"What Is Art?"
Lee Soon-jae	Performer	"What Is Art?"
