= Beyond Evil (TV series) =

2021 South Korean television series

- Promotional poster
- Hangul: 괴물
- Hanja: 怪物
- Lit.: Monster
- RR: Goemul
- MR: Koemul
- Genre: Procedural; Psychological thriller
- Created by: JTBC
- Written by: Kim Su-jin
- Directed by: Shim Na-yeon
- Starring: Shin Ha-kyun; Yeo Jin-goo
- Composer: Ha Geun-young
- Country of origin: South Korea
- Original language: Korean
- No. of episodes: 16

Production
- Executive producers: Park Jae-sam; Kim Ji-woo
- Producers: Park Woo-ram; Kim Bo-reum
- Cinematography: Jang Jong-kyung; Kwon Byeong-soo
- Editor: Jeon Mi-suk
- Running time: 70 minutes
- Production companies: Celltrion Entertainment; JTBC Studios

Original release
- Network: JTBC
- Release: February 19 – April 10, 2021

Beyond Evil (Korean: 괴물) is a 2021 South Korean television series directed by Shim Na-yeon, and starring Shin Ha-kyun and Yeo Jin-goo. It aired on JTBC from February 19 to April 10, 2021. It received seven nominations at the 57th Baeksang Arts Awards, winning three: Best Drama, Best Screenplay, and Best Actor for Shin Ha-kyun. It was also selected as one of the final candidates for the Baeksang Arts Award Grand Prize – Television.

== Synopsis ==
Beyond Evil follows the story of two fearless policemen from the Manyang Police Substation (Note: It can be seen as a branch office of the police station. In this case, Manyang Police Substation is under Munju Police Station.) of the Munju Police Station (located in the western part of Gyeonggi Province), Lee Dong-sik (Shin Ha-kyun) and Han Joo-won (Yeo Jin-goo), who break the law to catch a serial killer. In the course of uncovering the culprit's identity, they question the innocence of everyone involved in the case, including themselves. "Who is the monster?" "Is it you?" "Is it me?" "Is it us?"

== Inspiration ==
While the plot appears to make some allusions to Korea's Hwaseong serial murders case, the show is not based on a true story and is solely a work of fiction. The similarities can be explained by inspiration drawn from Memories of Murder (2003) by Bong Joon-ho.

== Cast ==
=== Main ===
- Shin Ha-kyun as Lee Dong-sik
  - Lee Do-hyun as teen Dong-sik
  - Kim Hyun-woo as young Dong-sik

An impulsive and eccentric sergeant at the Manyang Police Substation. Once a capable detective, he has been demoted to doing largely menial and tedious tasks. He seeks the killer of his sister.

- Yeo Jin-goo as Han Joo-won
  - Jung Hyeon-jun as young Joo-won

An elite detective from the International Crime Investigation Team at the Department of Foreign Affairs of the Seoul Metropolitan Police Agency transferred to Manyang Police Substation. Good-looking and capable, he has great influence due to being the son of the next-in-line Police Commissioner, Han Gi-hwan. He is determined to prove Lee Dong-sik guilty of his sister's murder.

=== Supporting ===
==== Manyang Butcher's Shop ====
- Choi Sung-eun as Yoo Jae-yi

Nicknamed the "Master of Knife", the owner of the Manyang Butcher Shop and Restaurant.

==== Manyang Police Substation ====
- Chun Ho-jin as Nam Sang-bae

The soon-to-retire Chief of Manyang Police Substation.

- Son Sang-gyu as Cho Gil-gu

A sergeant at Manyang Police Substation.

- Baek Seok-kwang as Hwang Kwang-young

A police officer at Manyang Police Substation.

- Nam Yoon-su as Oh Ji-hoon

The youngest police officer at the Manyang Police Substation and the brother of Oh Ji-hwa.

==== Munju Police Station ====
- Choi Dae-hoon as Park Jeong-je
  - Choi Chan-ho as teen Jeong-je
  - Seol Woo-hyung as young Jeong-je

The lieutenant of the Investigation Support Team at Munju Police Station, Lee Dong-sik's best friend, and son of congresswoman Do Hae-won.

- Kim Shin-rok as Oh Ji-hwa
  - Nam Ga-hyeon as teen Ji-hwa
  - Lee Ye-bit as young Ji-hwa

The team leader of the Dangerous Crimes Division, Lee Dong-sik's classmate from elementary to high school, and the former wife of CEO Lee Chang-jin.

- Shim Wan-joon as Kang Do-soo

An honest homicide detective at Munju Police Station whose role model is Dong-sik

- Jung Gyu-soo as Jung Cheol-mun

Chief of Munju Police Station.

- Seo Jeong-shik as Kwak Oh-sub

Senior detective at Munju Police Station.

- Park Bo-kyung as Im Sun-nyeo

Captain of the Forensic Investigation Team and Kang Do-soo's wife.

- Yoo Byung-hoon as Lieutenant Ha

==== Manyang People ====
- Gil Hae-yeon as Do Hae-won

The current councilwoman and aspiring mayoral candidate of Munju, and mother of Park Jeong-je.

- Heo Sung-tae as Lee Chang-jin

The CEO of JL Construction and the Chairperson of the Munju City Dream Town Development Committee.

- Lee Kyu-hoi as Kang Jin-mook
  - Park Kwang-il as young Kang Jin-mook

The owner of the Manyang Supermarket, Dong-sik's adopted brother, and the father of Kang Min-jung.

- Kang Min-ah as Kang Min-jung

The daughter of Kang Jin-mook, the owner of Manyang Supermarket.

- Kim Hieora as Bang Ju-seon
- Jung Jae-jin as Bang Ho-cheol, Bang Ju-seon's father.
- Jun Soo-hyun as Jang Oh-bok, Do Hae-won's secretary and bodyguard.
- Kim Jung-eun as Lee Kang-ja, Cho Gil-gu's wife.

==== People around Han Joo-won ====
- Choi Jin-ho as Han Gi-hwan

Han Joo-won's father and front-runner for the next Commissioner of the National Police Agency.

- Park Ji-hoon as Kwon Hyuk

A Munju City prosecutor who was once Joo-won's private high school tutor.

- Woo Jung-won as Lee Su-yeon

Han Gi-hwan's wife and Han Joo-won's mother.

==== People around Lee Dong-shik ====
- Moon Joo-yeon as Lee Yu-yeon

Dong-sik's fraternal twin sister.

- Park Myung-shin as Kim Yeong-hui

Yu-yeon & Dong-shik's mother

- Kim Jung-ho as Yu-yeon & Dong-shik's father

=== Others ===
- Cha Chung-hwa as Lee Geum-hwa
- Kim Bi-bi as Han Jeong-im
- Jang Sung-bum as Lee Sang-yeob
- Kang You-seok as Reporter Lim Gyu-seok
- Nam Mi-jung as Fish market lady
- Park Ji-ah as Neighborhood woman
- Jo Ji-seung as Yoon Mi-hye, Kang Min-jung's mother

== Production ==
Shin Ha-kyun and Yeo Jin-goo previously appeared in the film No Mercy for the Rude (2006) where Yeo played the younger version of Shin's character.

== Original soundtrack ==
Beyond Evil OST

Soundtrack album by Various artists
- Released: 2021
- Genre: Soundtrack
- Languages: Korean; English
- Labels: MUSIC&NEW; LEON Korea

=== Part 1 ===
Released on February 27, 2021
No.	Title	Lyrics	Music	Artist	Length
1.	"The Night"	Kim Hyun-ah (lalasweet); Park Tae-jin; Ban Kwang-ok; Jeon Yong-joon	Kim Hyun-ah (lalasweet); Park Tae-jin; Ban Kwang-ok; Jeon Yong-joon	Choi Baek-ho	3:53
2.	"The Night" (inst.)		Kim Hyun-ah (lalasweet); Park Tae-jin; Ban Kwang-ok; Jeon Yong-joon		3:53
Total length:					7:46

=== Part 2 ===
Released on March 6, 2021
No.	Title	Lyrics	Music	Artist	Length
1.	"Timeless"	Ha Geun-young; Choi Min-ji (Chansline); Kim Sung-min (Chansline); Kim Si-won (Chansline)	Choi Min-ji (Chansline); Kim Sung-min (Chansline); Kim Si-won (Chansline)	Bibi	3:21
2.	"Timeless" (inst.)		Choi Min-ji (Chansline); Kim Sung-min (Chansline); Kim Si-won (Chansline)		3:21
Total length:					6:42

=== Part 3 ===
Released on March 13, 2021
No.	Title	Lyrics	Music	Artist	Length
1.	"Empty"	Ha Geun-young; Lee Soo-yeon	Ha Geun-young; Lee Soo-yeon	Car, the Garden	4:00
2.	"Empty" (inst.)		Ha Geun-young; Lee Soo-yeon		4:00
Total length:					8:00

== Viewership ==
Beyond Evil : South Korea viewers per episode (thousands)

Season	Episode number																Average
Season	1	2	3	4	5	6	7	8	9	10	11	12	13	14	15	16	Average
1	1027	1051	1010	1003	828	1100	1011	1343	1157	1352	1066	1039	1142	1327	1265	1358	1130

Source: Audience measurement performed nationwide by Nielsen Korea

Average TV viewership ratings
Ep.	Original broadcast date	Title	Average audience share (Nielsen Korea)	
Ep.	Original broadcast date	Title	Nationwide	Seoul
1	February 19, 2021	Appear (나타나다)	4.451% (5th)	5.232% (4th)
2	February 20, 2021	Disappear (사라지다)	3.948% (6th)	4.854% (6th)
3	February 26, 2021	Smile (웃다)	4.330% (4th)	4.920% (4th)
4	February 27, 2021	Cry (울다)	4.204% (7th)	5.179% (6th)
5	March 5, 2021	Deceived (속다)	3.765% (7th)	4.237% (4th)
6	March 6, 2021	Deceive (속이다)	4.442% (6th)	4.881% (5th)
7	March 12, 2021	Catch (낚다)	4.172% (7th)	4.721% (4th)
8	March 13, 2021	Caught (낚이다)	5.356% (5th)	6.490% (2nd)
9	March 19, 2021	Float (떠오르대)	4.651% (4th)	5.498% (4th)
10	March 20, 2021	Sink (가라앉다)	5.502% (4th)	6.311% (1st)
11	March 26, 2021	Tighten (조이다)	4.682% (4th)	5.385% (4th)
12	March 27, 2021	Loosen (풀다)	4.279% (5th)	5.118% (1st)
13	April 2, 2021	Ask (묻다)	5.021% (4th)	5.840% (4th)
14	April 3, 2021	Answer (답하다)	5.302% (2nd)	6.317% (1st)
15	April 9, 2021	Letting Go (놓다)	5.355% (4th)	6.351% (4th)
16	April 10, 2021	Catch (잡다)	5.991% (1st)	6.666% (1st)
Average			4.716%	5.500%
In the table above, the blue numbers represent the lowest ratings and the red numbers represent the highest ratings.; This drama airs on a cable channel/pay TV which normally has a relatively smaller audience compared to free-to-air TV/public broadcasters (KBS, SBS, MBC and EBS).

== Awards and nominations ==
Name of the award ceremony, year presented, category, nominee of the award, and the result of the nomination
Award ceremony	Year	Category	Nominee / Work	Result	Ref.
APAN Star Awards	2022	Best New Actress	Choi Sung-eun	Nominated	
Baeksang Arts Awards	2021	Grand Prize	Beyond Evil	Nominated	
Baeksang Arts Awards	2021	Best Drama	Beyond Evil	Won	
Baeksang Arts Awards	2021	Best Director	Shim Na-yeon	Nominated	
Baeksang Arts Awards	2021	Best Screenplay	Kim Su-jin	Won	
Baeksang Arts Awards	2021	Best Actor	Shin Ha-kyun	Won	
Baeksang Arts Awards	2021	Best Supporting Actor	Choi Dae-hoon	Nominated	
Baeksang Arts Awards	2021	Best New Actress	Choi Sung-eun	Nominated	
Baeksang Arts Awards	2021	Technical Award (Cinematography)	Jang Jong-kyung	Nominated	

=== Listicle ===
Name of publisher, year listed, name of listicle, and placement
Publisher	Year	Listicle	Placement	Ref.
NME	2021	The 10 best Korean dramas of 2021	9th	

== Remake ==
Beyond Evil has recently landed the J-drama adaptation, with no further news on which broadcasters nor the airing date was publicly announced.
