= Chunsa Film Art Awards 2021 =

26th edition of award ceremony

- The 26th Chunsa International Film Festival
- Official poster
- Awarded for: Excellence in cinematic achievements
- Date: November 19, 2021
- Country: South Korea
- Presented by: Korean Film Directors Association
- Hosted by: Kim Tae-hoon
- Formerly called: Chunsa Film Festival
- Motto: New Birth of Cinema

Highlights
- Most nominations: Peninsula - 5; Moving On - 5
- Best Director: Jo Sung-hee – Space Sweepers
- Best Actor: Song Joong-ki – Space Sweepers
- Best Actress: Jeon Do-yeon – Beasts Clawing at Straws
- Best Supporting Actress: Bae Jong-ok – Innocence
- Best Supporting Actor: Park Jung-min – Deliver Us from Evil
- Website: http://www.chunsa.or.kr

The Chunsa Film Art Awards (Korean: 춘사국제영화제; also known as The 26th Chunsa International Film Festival) have been hosted by the Korean Film Directors Association, since the 1990s to commemorate the Korean film pioneer Chunsa Na Woon-gyu.

Themed as 'A New Birth of Cinema', The 26th Chunsa International Film Festival was to be held on August 27, but due to surge in COVID-19 pandemic, it was postponed for November 19, 2021. In this edition, 23 films were nominated for the main awards in 10 categories. Over-the-top (OTT) original films were also included in the nominations, such as the Netflix films Space Sweepers, The Call and Night in Paradise.

The awards ceremony on 19 November was hosted by pop columnist Kim Tae-hoon. The Grand Prix best director award was won by Jo Sung-hee for Space Sweepers. The film also won the best actor award for Song Joong-ki.

== Selection committee ==
- Kim Jong-won (film critic)
- Kim Hyung-seok (film journalist and Pyeongchang International Peace Film Festival programmer)
- Nam Dong-cheol (Busan International Film Festival program director and former editor of Cine21)
- Seo Gok-suk (Seoul Film Council chairwoman)
- Yang Kyung-mi (film critic and director of Korea Institute for Film & Media Contents Industry)
- Baek Jae-wook (YouTube creator)

The nominations go through a judging committee consisting of directors to decide the final list of nominations.

== Winners and nominees ==
The nominees for the 26th Chunsa Film Art Awards were announced on July 5, 2021.

Winners are in bold

**Best Director**	**Best Screenplay**
**Jo Sung-hee – Space Sweepers**; Lee Jun-ik – The Book of Fish; Hong Won-chan – Deliver Us from Evil; Lee Jong-pil – Samjin Company English Class; Yang Woo-suk – Steel Rain 2: Summit; Yeon Sang-ho – Peninsula	**Hong Soo-young – Samjin Company English Class**; Kim Se-gyeom – The Book of Fish; Park Ji-wan – The Day I Died: Unclosed Case; Yoon Dan-bi – Moving On; Hong Eui-jeong – Voice of Silence; Kim Cho-hee – Lucky Chan-sil
**Best Actor**	**Best Actress**
**Song Joong-ki – Space Sweepers as Kim Tae-ho**; Sul Kyung-gu – The Book of Fish as Jeong Yak-jeon; Yoo Ah-in – Voice of Silence as Tae-in; Lee Jung-jae – Deliver Us from Evil as Ray; Cho Jin-woong – Me and Me as Park Hyung-goo	**Jeon Do-yeon – Beasts Clawing at Straws as Choi Yeon-hee**; Ra Mi-ran – Honest Candidate as Joo Sang-sook; Moon So-ri – Three Sisters as Mi-yeon; Go Ah-seong – Samjin Company English Class as Lee Ja-young; Jeon Jong-seo – The Call as Oh Young-sook; Ye Soo-jung - An Old Lady as Shim Hyo-jeong
**Best Supporting Actor**	**Best Supporting Actress**
**Park Jung-min – Deliver Us from Evil as Yui**; Shin Jung-geun – Steel Rain 2: Summit as Jang Ki-seok; Koo Kyo-hwan – Peninsula as Captain Seo; Cha Seung-won – Night in Paradise as Ma Sang-gil; Yang Heung-Ju – Moving On as Lee Byeong-ki; Ryu Soo-young – Steel Rain 2: Summit as Park Cheol-woo	**Bae Jong-ok – Innocence as Chae Hwa-ja**; Kim Sun-young – Three Sisters as Hee-sook; Lee Jung-eun – The Day I Died: Unclosed Case as Suncheondaek; Esom – Samjin Company English Class as Jung Yoo-na; Youn Yuh-jung – Lucky Chan-sil as Grandmother; Lee Re – Peninsula as Jooni
**Best New Actor**	**Best New Actress**
**Lee Bong-geun – The Singer as Hak-gyoo**; Kim Do-yoon – Peninsula as Koo Chul-min; Hong Kyung – Innocence as Ahn Jung-soo; Park Seung-joon – Moving On as Lee Dong-Joo; Kwak Min-gyu – Move the Grave as Baek Seung-rak	**Choi Jung-woon – Moving On as Lee Ok-Joo**; Park So-yi – Pawn as young Seung-yi; Jang Yoon-ju – Three Sisters as Mi-ok; Lim Seong-mi – Fighter as Jin-ah; Krystal Jung – More Than Family as Kim To-il; Kang Mal-geum – Lucky Chan-sil as Lee Chan-sil
**Best New Director**	**Technical Award**
**Yoon Dan-bi – Moving On**; Kim Cho-hee – Lucky Chan-sil; Hong Eui-jeong – Voice of Silence; Lim Seon-ae – An Old Lady; Jung Jin-young – Me and Me; Lee Chung-hyun – The Call	**Lee Mok-won, Yoo Chung, Park Joon-young (Production design) – Peninsula**; Park Dae-hoon, Jeong Seong-jin (Visual effects) – Space Sweepers; Hong Kyung-pyo (Cinematography) – Deliver Us from Evil; Han Mi-yeon (Editing) – Beasts Clawing at Straws; Choi Yong-jin (Cinematography) – The Singer
**Audience's Most Popular Movie Award**	**Achievement Award**
* **Hong Won-chan – Deliver Us from Evil**	* **Lee Won-se, Park Jong-won**
**Special Award for Feature Film**	**Special Award**
* **Jo Jung-rae - The Singer**	* **Lee Isaac Chung** - Minari

== Films with multiple nominations and wins ==
The following films received multiple nominations:

Nominations	Films
5	Peninsula
5	Moving On
4	Deliver Us from Evil
4	Lucky Chan-sil
4	Samjin Company English Class
3	Steel Rain 2: Summit
3	Space Sweepers
3	The Book of Fish
3	Voice of Silence
3	Three Sisters
2	An Old Lady
2	The Call
2	Me and Me
2	The Day I Died: Unclosed Case
2	Innocence
2	The Singer
2	Beasts Clawing at Straws

== See also ==
- 57th Baeksang Arts Awards
- 41st Blue Dragon Film Awards
- 29th Buil Film Awards
