= Me and Me =

2020 South Korean mystery-drama film

- Theatrical release poster
- Hangul: 사라진 시간
- Hanja: 사라진 時間
- RR: Sarajin sigan
- MR: Sarajin sigan
- Directed by: Jung Jin-young
- Screenplay by: Jung Jin-young
- Produced by: Jang Won-suk
- Starring: Cho Jin-woong; Bae Soo-bin; Jung Hae-kyun; Cha Soo-yeon
- Cinematography: Kim Hyun-suk
- Edited by: Kim Woo-il
- Music by: Dalpalan; Sung Ki-wan; Heo Joon-hyuk
- Production companies: B.A. Entertainment; Dani Film
- Distributed by: Acemaker Movieworks
- Release date: June 18, 2020
- Running time: 105 minutes
- Country: South Korea
- Language: Korean
- Box office: US$1.2 million

Me and Me (Korean: 사라진 시간; RR: Sarajin sigan) is a 2020 South Korean mystery film written and directed by Jung Jin-young in his directorial debut, starring Cho Jin-woong, Bae Soo-bin, Jung Hae-kyun, and Cha Soo-yeon. It follows a detective who struggles to uncover the truth after everything he was certain of disappears. The film was theatrically released on June 18, 2020.

== Plot ==
In a quiet rural village of a small town, a mysterious fire accident leads to the death of an outsider couple. Detective Hyung-goo, assigned to investigate the case, begins to notice the villagers' suspicious behavior. As he follows the clues, he suddenly finds himself in a shocking situation where his entire life is turned upside down overnight. The house which burned down in his memory, is standing unblemished. The village residents call him teacher instead of detective. His home, his family, his job, everything he once knew, has vanished.

== Cast ==
- Cho Jin-woong as Park Hyung-goo
- Bae Soo-bin as Kim Soo-hyuk
- Jung Hae-kyun as Jung Hae-kyun
- Cha Soo-yeon as Yoon Yi-young
- Lee Sun-bin as Cho-hee
- Shin Dong-mi as Jun Ji-hyun/Mi-kyung
- Shin Kang-kyun
- Jang Won-young
- Lee Jang-won
- Noh Kang-min

== Production ==
Principal photography began on September 30, 2018, and wrapped on November 18, 2018.

== Release ==
The film was theatrically released on June 18, 2020.

It was screened at the 24th Fantasia International Film Festival's signature Cheval Noir competition, earning a Special Mention for Best Actor prize, for Cho Jin-woong, as well as a Special Mention from the jury for Debut Films Competition. The film also invited to the 19th Florence Korean Film Festival and 15th Paris Korean Film Festival.

== Awards and nominations ==
Year	Award	Category	Recipient(s)	Result	Ref.
2020	24th Fantasia International Film Festival	Special Mention for the Best Actor	Cho Jin-woong	Won	
2020	24th Fantasia International Film Festival	Special Mention for Debut Films	Jung Jin-young	Won	
2020	29th Buil Film Awards	Best New Director	Jung Jin-young	Nominated	
2020	21st Busan Film Critics Awards	Best New Director	Jung Jin-young	Won	
2020	21st Busan Film Critics Awards	Best Actor	Cho Jin-woong	Won	
2021	41st Blue Dragon Film Awards	Best New Director	Jung Jin-young	Nominated	
2021	57th Baeksang Arts Awards	Best Actor – Film	Cho Jin-woong	Nominated	
2021	8th Wildflower Film Awards	Best Actor	Cho Jin-woong	Nominated	
2021	8th Wildflower Film Awards	Best Director	Jung Jin-young	Nominated	
2021	8th Wildflower Film Awards	Best Screenplay	Jung Jin-young	Nominated	
2021	8th Wildflower Film Awards	Best New Director	Jung Jin-young	Won	
2021	26th Chunsa Film Art Awards	Best New Director	Jung Jin-young	Nominated	
2021	26th Chunsa Film Art Awards	Best Actor	Cho Jin-woong	Nominated	
