= Hong Eui-jeong =

Korean film director

- Born: 1982 (age 43–44); Chungcheong Province, South Korea
- Education: Korea National University of Arts; London Film School
- Occupations: Film director Screenwriter; Producer; Cinematographer
- Years active: 2005-present

Korean name
- Hangul: 홍의정
- RR: Hong Uijeong
- MR: Hong Ŭijŏng

Hong Eui-jeong (Korean: 홍의정; born 1982) is a South Korean film director, screenwriter and producer. She has won the Blue Dragon Film Awards for Best New Director, Best New Director at the Asian Film Awards, Buil Film Awards and Korean Association of Film Critics Awards, and Best Director at the Baeksang Arts Awards for her feature directorial debut in indie crime drama film Voice of Silence (2020).

== Career ==
Born in 1982, Hong Eui-jeong grew up in a remote rural area of Chungcheong Province, South Korea. She graduated from the Korea National University of Arts in visual design in 2005. She spent around 2 years serving as camera operator, cinematographer, producer and assistant director for commercials and music videos before studying at the London Film School. After she graduated as a cinematographer in 2011, she stayed and worked in London for a few more years, making several short films and commercials. Working as a director of photography in short Hot & Bothered, the film won Best Shorts at BBC's Creative Climate Short Film Competition Award of Excellence in 2012.

In 2016, Hong wrote and directed sci-fi short film Better Than Tomorrow. The film, which portrays a man searching for his wife in a mysterious rehabilitation facility after being frozen for many years, won Best Student Film at London Short Film Festival. That same year, her screenplay Without a Sound was selected as one of the top 12 projects at Venice Biennale Collage-Cinema 2016/2017, and shortlisted for Sundance Screenwriters Lab with working title Without a Trace. The following year, Hong and BAFTA winning producer Afolabi Kuti developed the screenplay to a feature film. She next released her short Habitat. A story which is set in the near future where South and North Korea have been reunified, the film was premiered at the 2018 Busan International Film Festival.

In 2020 Hong released her feature debut Voice of Silence, which was based on the screenplay Without a Sound, starring Yoo Ah-in and Yoo Jae-myung. It tells a story of two clean-up crew for a crime organization who receive an order to take care of an eleven-year-old kidnapped girl. Prior to the release, the film was screened at the Cannes International Film Festival's virtual market Marché du Film in June 2020. It was also screened at various film festivals, such as the Glasgow Film Festival, Fantasy Filmfest, Far East Film Festival, Brussels International Fantastic Film Festival, and Transilvania International Film Festival in 2021. The film was critically acclaimed. Rouven Linnarz from Asian Movie Pulse wrote, "Hong Eui-jeong has created an ambitious piece of work, whose cast and aesthetics are just two aspects within a story that offers a rich, but also grim social subtext". Nikki Baughan from Screen International called it, "a remarkable first feature from a talented new director who, one hopes, is only just beginning to find her own voice", and "a beautifully executed thriller which would be an impressive piece of work for any filmmaker, let alone one making her feature debut". Jennie Kermode of Eye of Film was similarly positive and wrote, "Hong Eui-jeong directs with such assurance and such flair that it's hard to believe this is her first feature", and concluded, "Voice Of Silence will horrify you, charm you, make you laugh, thrill you and leave you on the brink of tears. This is the kind of work that cinema was invented for." Nick Allen of Roger Ebert wrote in his Fantasia review, "[...] an impressive feat far more nuanced than Hollywood would ever dare without making it a jokey affair", and "[...] Hong is confident, and wholly trusting the audience does not see black and white".

For her first feature film Voice of Silence, Hong earned Best New Director at the 41st Blue Dragon Film Awards and Best Director at the 57th Baeksang Arts Awards, respectively. She also won Best New Director awards at the 30th Buil Film Awards, 15th Asian Film Awards, and 41st Korean Association of Film Critics Awards, and the film won Cheval Noir Award for Best Feature (Best Film) at the 2021 Fantasia International Film Festival.

== Filmography ==
=== Film ===
Year	English title	Korean title	Credited as	Note
2005	I Did Not Say That	나는 그렇게 말하지 않았어요	Writer, director	Short animation
2009	Scented Room		Writer, director	Short film, UK
2010	K.F.D.H.		Writer, director	Short film, UK
2012	The Path		Writer, director	short film
2012	Hot & Bothered		Cinematographer	Short film, UK
2014	Better Than Tomorrow		Writer, director	Short film, UK
2016	Say My Name		Writer, director	Short film, UK
2018	Habitat	서식지	Writer, director	Short film
2020	Voice of Silence	소리도 없이	Writer, director	Feature film
2026	White Blast	폭설	Writer, director	Feature film
2027	Soulbound	복수귀	Writer, director	Feature film

=== Commercial and music video ===
- It's Rising Again, Music Video, UK 2013 (writer/director)
- Step Back (Ofgem Series), Online Commercial, UK 2015 (director)

== Awards and nominations ==
Year	Award	Category	Nominated work	Result	Ref.
2016	London Short Film Festival	Best Student Film (Shooting People Award)	Better Than Tomorrow	Won	
2021	41st Blue Dragon Film Awards	Best Film	Voice of Silence	Nominated	
2021	41st Blue Dragon Film Awards	Best Screenplay	Voice of Silence	Nominated	
2021	41st Blue Dragon Film Awards	Best New Director	Voice of Silence	Won	
2021	57th Baeksang Arts Awards	Best Film	Voice of Silence	Nominated	
2021	57th Baeksang Arts Awards	Best Director	Voice of Silence	Won	
2021	57th Baeksang Arts Awards	Best Screenplay	Voice of Silence	Nominated	
2021	57th Baeksang Arts Awards	Best New Director	Voice of Silence	Nominated	
2021	25th Fantasia International Film Festival	Cheval Noir Award for Best Film	Voice of Silence	Won	
2021	30th Buil Film Awards	Best Film	Voice of Silence	Nominated	
2021	30th Buil Film Awards	Best Director	Voice of Silence	Nominated	
2021	30th Buil Film Awards	Best New Director	Voice of Silence	Won	
2021	15th Asian Film Awards	Best Screenplay	Voice of Silence	Nominated	
2021	15th Asian Film Awards	Best New Director	Voice of Silence	Won	
2021	41st Korean Association of Film Critics Awards	Best New Director	Voice of Silence	Won	
2021	26th Chunsa International Film Festival	Best Screenplay	Voice of Silence	Nominated	
2021	26th Chunsa International Film Festival	Best New Director	Voice of Silence	Nominated	
2021	22nd Busan Film Critics Awards	Best Film	Voice of Silence	Won	
2021	22nd Busan Film Critics Awards	Best Screenplay	Voice of Silence	Won	
2021	8th Korean Film Producers Association Awards	Best New Director	Voice of Silence	Won	
2022	20th Director's Cut Awards	Best Director	Voice of Silence	Nominated	
2022	20th Director's Cut Awards	Best Screenplay	Voice of Silence	Nominated	
2022	20th Director's Cut Awards	Best New Director	Voice of Silence	Won	
