= Lucky Chan-sil =

2020 South Korean drama fantasy film

- Theatrical release poster
- Hangul: 찬실이는 복도 많지
- RR: Chansirineun bokdo manchi
- MR: Ch'ansirinŭn pokto manch'i
- Directed by: Kim Cho-hee
- Written by: Kim Cho-hee
- Produced by: Seo Dong-hyun; Kim Sung-eun
- Starring: Kang Mal-geum; Youn Yuh-jung; Kim Young-min; Yoon Seung-ah; Bae Yoo-ram
- Cinematography: Ji Sang-bin
- Edited by: Son Yeon-ji
- Music by: Jeong Jung-yeop
- Production companies: Ge Production; Youn's Corporation
- Distributed by: Megabox Plus M
- Release dates: October 8, 2019 (BIFF); March 5, 2020 (South Korea)
- Running time: 96 minutes
- Country: South Korea
- Language: Korean
- Box office: $177,353

Lucky Chan-sil (Korean: 찬실이는 복도 많지) is a 2019 South Korean fantasy romance film written and directed by Kim Cho-hee. It stars Kang Mal-geum in the title role, alongside Youn Yuh-jung, Kim Young-min, Yoon Seung-ah and Bae Yoo-ram. The film was released in theaters on March 5, 2020.

== Plot ==
Lee Chan-sil is a film producer who becomes jobless after the director she has worked with for years suddenly dies. She starts working as a cleaning lady for an actress and meets her new employer's French teacher. She is immediately attracted to him but she is held back by her life problems. Chan-sil realizes old anxieties are about to emerge: her already gone-youth, messed-up love life, and broken career.

== Cast ==
=== Main ===
- Kang Mal-geum as Lee Chan-sil
- Youn Yuh-jung as Grandmother
- Kim Young-min as Jang Gook-young
- Yoon Seung-ah as Sophie
- Bae Yoo-ram as Kim-young

=== Special appearances ===
- Choi Hwa-jung as Representative Park
- Lee Young-jin as an actress
- Seo Sang-won as Director Ji

== Release ==
The film had its world premiere at the 24th Busan International Film Festival on October 8, 2019 and was released in South Korean theaters on March 5, 2020.

It was screened at the 15th Osaka Asian Film Festival on March 9 and 14, 2020.

The North American premiere of the film was scheduled to be held at the 63rd San Francisco International Film Festival on April 16 and 18, 2020 before the festival was canceled due to the COVID-19 pandemic.

The film was invited to compete at the 22nd Udine Far East Film Festival which was postponed from April 24 – May 2 to June 26 – July 4 due to the COVID-19 pandemic.

== Reception ==
=== Critical response ===
Marc Raymond of Senses of Cinema said that "The self-reflexive style risks making the film just an in-joke exercise, but it is kept afloat by the genuine existential sadness of the lead character, who has devoted her life to her work in cinema, forsaking marriage and children, and is left doubting her life choices and wondering if she could perhaps change course."

=== Accolades ===
| Award | Year | Category | Recipient(s) | Result | Ref. |
|---|---|---|---|---|---|
| 56th Baeksang Arts Awards | 2020 | Best Supporting Actor | Kim Young-mim | Nominated | |
| 56th Baeksang Arts Awards | 2020 | Best New Actress | Kang Mal-Geum | Won | |
| 56th Baeksang Arts Awards | 2020 | Best New Director | Kim Cho-hee | Nominated | |
| Bechdel Day | 2020 | Bechdel Choice 10 | Lucky Chan-sil | Won | |
| Blue Dragon Film Awards | 2021 | Best New Director | Kim Cho-hee | Nominated | |
| Blue Dragon Film Awards | 2021 | Best New Actress | Kang Mal-Geum | Won | |
| Busan Film Critics Awards | 2020 | Best Actress | Kang Mal-geum | Won | |
| Busan International Film Festival | 2019 | Directors Guild of Korea Award | Lucky Chan-sil | Won | |
| Busan International Film Festival | 2019 | CGV Arthouse Award | Lucky Chan-sil | Won | |
| Busan International Film Festival | 2019 | KBS Independent Film Award | Lucky Chan-sil | Won | |
| 29th Buil Film Awards | 2020 | Best Film | Lucky Chan-sil | Nominated | |
| 29th Buil Film Awards | 2020 | Best Supporting Actor | Kim Young-min | Nominated | |
| 29th Buil Film Awards | 2020 | Best Supporting Actress | Youn Yuh-jung | Nominated | |
| 29th Buil Film Awards | 2020 | Best New Director | Kim Cho-hee | Nominated | |
| 29th Buil Film Awards | 2020 | Best New Actress | Kang Mal-geum | Won | |
| Cine 21 Awards | 2020 | Best New Actress | Kang Mal-Geum | Won | |
| 40th Korean Association of Film Critics Awards | 2020 | Best New Actress | Kang Mal-geum | Won | |
| 40th Korean Association of Film Critics Awards | 2020 | Top 10 Films | Lucky Chan-sil | Won | |
| 7th Korean Film Producers Association Awards | 2020 | Best Supporting Actress | Youn Yuh-jung | Won | |
| 7th Korean Film Producers Association Awards | 2020 | Best Screenplay | Kim Cho-hee | Won | |
| 45th Seoul Independent Film Festival | 2019 | Audience Award | Lucky Chan-sil | Won | |
| 21st Women in Film Korea Festival | 2020 | Best New Actress | Kang Mal-geum | Won | |
