= Innocence (2020 film) =

2020 film by Park Sang-hyun

- Theatrical release poster
- Hangul: 결백
- Hanja: 潔白
- RR: Gyeolbaek
- MR: Kyŏlbaek
- Directed by: Park Sang-hyun
- Written by: Park Sang-hyun
- Produced by: Park Joon
- Starring: Shin Hye-sun; Bae Jong-ok; Huh Joon-ho
- Cinematography: Yoo Il-seung
- Edited by: Yang Dong-yeop; Kim Jae-bum
- Music by: Lee Ji-soo
- Production company: IDIOPLAN
- Distributed by: Sony Pictures Entertainment Korea; Kidari Entertainment
- Release date: June 10, 2020
- Running time: 111 minutes
- Country: South Korea
- Language: Korean
- Budget: ₩5.7 billion
- Box office: US$6.7 million

Innocence (Korean: 결백; RR: Gyeolbaek) is a 2020 South Korean legal drama film written and directed by Park Sang-hyun. The film stars Shin Hye-sun, Bae Jong-ok, and Huh Joon-ho. It follows a lawyer who defends her mother on trial for murder.

Innocence was theatrically released on June 10, 2020. The film received positive reviews from critics, who praised the performances of the cast.

== Plot ==
Jung-in, an ace lawyer at a law firm, hears the news of her father Tae-su's death late, but does not go to the funeral. A few days later, Jung-in hears shocking news on TV. At her father's funeral held at her hometown, she heard that pesticides were detected in the makgeolli that mourners drank, that village elder Mr. Ji died, and that Mayor Choo and three others were in critical condition. In addition, she is shocked to learn that the person arrested as a suspect is her mother, Chae Hwa-ja.

== Cast ==
- Shin Hye-sun as Ahn Jung-in
- Bae Jong-ok as Chae Hwa-ja, Jung-in and Jung-soo's mother
- Huh Joon-ho as Mayor Choo
- Hong Kyung as Ahn Jung-soo, Jung-in's younger brother
- Tae Hang-ho as Yang Wang-yong
- Ko Chang-seok as Seedsman
- Park Chul-min as Hwang Bang-younh
- Kim Su-hyeon as law firm vice president
- Cha Soon-bae as Na Il-jung
- Jung In-gyeom as Public prosecutor Shin
- Han Yi-jin as Choi Seok-goo
- Shin Cheol-jin as Ji Young-deok

=== Special appearances ===
- Kim Young-jae as Director Park
- Kim Suk-hoon as Lim Choon-woo
- Park Sung-geun as law firm representative
- Bae Hae-sun as Mayor Choo's wife
- Park Jin-young as High Court judge

== Production ==
=== Casting ===
On November 8, 2018, actresses Shin Hye-sun and Bae Jong-ok were confirmed to star in the courtroom film Innocence. Han Yi-jin was confirmed to have joined the cast on December 11, followed by Tae Hang-ho on December 12.

The film marks Shin Hye-sun's first major role in a film. She revealed that one of the reasons why she chose this film is because her father advised her to. She added that "such female-led legal dramas are not common these days, and [her] fans wanted [her] to play the role of a lawyer someday due to [her] clear diction." Shin used Elizabeth Sloane (the main character of the 2016 American film Miss Sloane, played by Jessica Chastain) as a source of inspiration while preparing for her role.

Bae Jong-ok chose to play Jung-in's mother "out of thirst for an acting transformation" as her character looks 30 years older than her. She also accepted to play in the film because she "wondered how complicated and twisted relationships between neighbors can get if their respective families have a history between them."

According to director Park Sang-hyun, the role of the mayor could only be played by Huh Joon-ho as the character "is rumored to have perfectly pulled off a double-faced man full of greed and corruption."

=== Filming ===
Principal photography began on December 3, 2018 and filming was completed on February 28, 2019.

== Release ==
The film was originally set to be released on March 5, 2020. Due to the COVID-19 pandemic, promotional events were cancelled and the distributor decided to postpone the release to May 27. After a new cluster emerged in central Seoul in mid-May, the release was pushed back to June. On May 22, it was announced that the film would hit theaters on June 11. On June 4, it was announced that the film would be released one day earlier, on June 10.

== Reception ==
=== Box office ===
The film topped the South Korean box office during its opening weekend, with an estimated 203,000 moviegoers. It surpassed 500,000 ticket sales the following week.

=== Awards and nominations ===
Year	Award	Category	Recipient	Result	Ref.
2020	29th Buil Film Awards	Best New Actor	Hong Kyung	Nominated	
2021	41st Blue Dragon Film Awards	Best Supporting Actress	Bae Jong-ok	Nominated	
2021	41st Blue Dragon Film Awards	Best New Actor	Hong Kyung	Nominated	
2021	41st Blue Dragon Film Awards	Best New Actress	Shin Hye-sun	Nominated	
2021	57th Baeksang Arts Awards	Best Supporting Actor	Huh Joon-ho	Nominated	
2021	57th Baeksang Arts Awards	Best Supporting Actress	Bae Jong-ok	Nominated	
2021	57th Baeksang Arts Awards	Best New Actor	Hong Kyung	Won	
2021	57th Baeksang Arts Awards	Best New Actress	Shin Hye-sun	Nominated	
2021	26th Chunsa Film Art Awards	Best Supporting Actress	Bae Jong-ok	Won	
2021	26th Chunsa Film Art Awards	Best New Actor	Hong Kyung	Nominated	
