= Yoo Jae-myung =

South Korean actor (born 1973)

- Yoo in 2026
- Born: June 3, 1973 (age 53); Busan, South Korea
- Education: Pusan National University
- Occupation: Actor
- Years active: 2001–present
- Agents: SBD Entertainment; Ace Factory
- Spouse: Unknown (m. 2018)
- Children: 1

Korean name
- Hangul: 유재명
- RR: Yu Jaemyeong
- MR: Yu Chaemyŏng

Yoo Jae-myung (Korean: 유재명; born June 3, 1973) is a South Korean actor. He is best known for his roles in the series Reply 1988 (2015), Stranger (2017), Life (2018), Itaewon Class (2020) and Voice of Silence (2020). He won Best Supporting Actor at the 6th APAN Star Awards.

== Career ==
Making his debut through the film The Last Witness in 2001, Yoo Jae-myung mainly took the supporting roles in movies and dramas. He was also a theater director in Busan and taught acting for four years in Seoul.

Yoo's popularity was raised through one of the highest rated dramas in Korean cable television history, Reply 1988, in 2015, and he later gained the main roles in films and TV series. From 2016 to 2018, he appeared in critically acclaimed shows such as The Good Wife, Stranger (Secret Forest), and Prison Playbook.

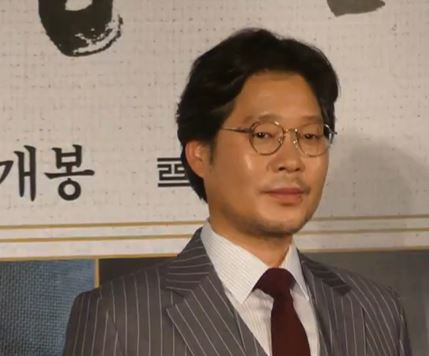
Yoo in August 2018

Yoo then appeared in two television series Life and Confession in 2018 and 2019 respectively, in which he received positive reviews from audiences. For his performance in Life, he won Best Supporting Actor award at the 6th APAN Star Awards.

Yoo next co-starred with Lee Sung-min in crime film The Beast, a remake of the French thriller 36 Quai des Orfèvres, premiered in June 2019. He also starred alongside Lee Young-ae in Bring Me Home, which was premiered in November 2019.

In 2020, Yoo co-starred with Park Seo-joon and Kim Da-mi in the series Itaewon Class, He next starred opposite Yoo Ah-in in a film Voice of Silence, written and directed by a female director Hong Eui-jeong, based on her script which was selected as one of top 12 projects at Venice Biennale College-Cinema 2016/2017.

In 2022, Yoo starred Kingmaker with Sul Kyung-gu.

Yoo's next projects will be starring Kwak Kyung-taek's Firefighters.

== Personal life ==
=== Marriage and family ===
Yoo married on October 21, 2018, after dating for five years. He had met his wife who is reportedly twelve years younger while directing a stage play. The couple has one child together.

== Filmography ==
=== Film ===
| Year | Title | Role | Notes | Ref. |
|---|---|---|---|---|
| 2001 | The Last Witness | Escaped captive | | |
| 2005 | Blue Swallow | Military police investigator | | |
| 2006 | Almost Love | Film director | | |
| 2006 | Bloody Tie | Police officer | | |
| 2007 | Meet Mr. Daddy | Doctor | | |
| 2008 | Open City | Member of identification section | | |
| 2009 | Wish | Teacher Moon Hak-jong | | |
| 2011 | Hit | Ha-na | | |
| 2012 | Miss Conspirator | Chief detective | | |
| 2012 | Nameless Gangster: Rules of the Time | Detective Kim | | |
| 2012 | Code Name: Jackal | City councilor | | |
| 2012 | South Bound | Public security head | | |
| 2013 | Rockin' on Heaven's Door | Intensive care doctor | | |
| 2013 | The Face Reader | Government official | | |
| 2013 | Commitment | Kim Sun-myung | | |
| 2013 | Steal My Heart | Doctor | | |
| 2014 | Monster | Police constable | | |
| 2014 | For the Emperor | Broker | | |
| 2014 | The Tunnel | Coal mine owner | | |
| 2014 | Whistle Blower | Hospital director | | |
| 2014 | Minor Club | | | |
| 2015 | Fourth Place | | | |
| 2015 | Outsider: Mean Streets | | | |
| 2015 | Made in China | President Jang | | |
| 2015 | Veteran | Truck driver | | |
| 2015 | Inside Men | Chief reporter | | |
| 2015 | The Tiger: An Old Hunter's Tale | Hunter Yoo | | |
| 2016 | The Truth Beneath | | | |
| 2017 | A Day | Kang-sik | | |
| 2017 | Merry Christmas Mr. Mo | Man-je | | |
| 2017 | The Chase | Detective Ko | | |
| 2017 | VIP | Senior Manager of North Korea Ministry of People's Security | | |
| 2018 | Broker | Engineer of broadcasting station | | |
| 2018 | Drug King | Detective squad chief Kim | | |
| 2018 | Golden Slumber | Sang-won | | |
| 2018 | Feng Shui | Koo Yong-sik | | |
| 2019 | Mal-Mo-E: The Secret Mission | Kim Doo-bong | Special appearance | |
| 2019 | Money | Deal orderer | | |
| 2019 | The Gangster, The Cop, The Devil | Heo Sang-do | | |
| 2019 | The Beast | Detective Min-tae | | |
| 2019 | Bring Me Home | Hong Kyeong-jang | | |
| 2020 | Voice of Silence | Chang-bok | | |
| 2020 | Baseball Girl | Leader Kim | | |
| 2020 | Secret Garden | Jung won's uncle | Independent Film | |
| 2022 | Kingmaker | Kim Young-ho | | |
| 2022 | Alienoid | Hyun-gam | | |
| 2022 | Hunt | Choi Gyu-sang | Special appearance | |
| 2022 | Far East | Lee Su-yeong | sound film | |
| 2024 | Land of Happiness | Jeon Sang-doo | | |
| 2024 | The Firefighters | Kang In-ki | | |
| 2024 | Harbin | Choi Jae-hyeong | | |
| 2026 | Ugly Duckling Ms. Maeng | Moon Joo-yeol | | |
| TBA | Seeking the King | Ju-bok | | |
| TBA | Portrait of a Family | Kwak Chang-gi | | |
| TBA | Unautonomous Project | | | |

=== Television series ===
| Year | Title | Role | Notes | Ref. |
|---|---|---|---|---|
| 2010 | KBS Drama Special: "Last Flashman" | | 1 episode | |
| 2011 | Lights and Shadows | Film director | | |
| 2011 | My Daughter the Flower | Reporter Baek | | |
| 2011 | I Live in Cheongdam-dong | PD | | |
| 2012 | The King 2 Hearts | PD | | |
| 2012 | Angel's Choice | PD | | |
| 2012 | Ji Woon-soo's Stroke of Luck | Min-seo's father | | |
| 2012 | Quiz of God 3 | Anesthesiologist | | |
| 2013 | Special Affairs Team TEN 2 | Chief of center | | |
| 2013 | The Blade and Petal | Kil-boo | | |
| 2013 | Good Doctor | Killer | Episode 15 | |
| 2014 | Wonderful Day in October | | 2 episodes Lunar New Year Special Drama | |
| 2014 | Angel Eyes | | Cameo | |
| 2014 | KBS Drama Special: "Illegal Parking" | Kim Byung-gab | | |
| 2014 | Misaeng: Incomplete Life | Factory employee | Cameo | |
| 2014 | House of Bluebird | Department head Im | | |
| 2014 | Forever Young | | Broadcast on VTV, Vietnam | |
| 2015 | Mrs. Cop | Accomplice | | |
| 2015 | Reply 1988 | Yoo Jae-myung | | |
| 2016 | My Horrible Boss | Jo Dong-gyoo | | |
| 2016 | The Good Wife | Son Dong-ho | | |
| 2016 | Don't Dare to Dream | Eom Ki-dae | | |
| 2016 | Hwarang: The Poet Warrior Youth | Pa-o | | |
| 2017 | Strong Girl Bong-soon | Do Chil-goo | | |
| 2017, 2020 | Stranger | Lee Chang-joon | Main (season 1); Guest (season 2) | |
| 2017 | Prison Playbook | Kim Je-hyeok's agent | | |
| 2017 | The Most Beautiful Goodbye | Geun-deok | | |
| 2018 | Life | Joo Kyung-moon | | |
| 2018 | JTBC Drama Festa: "Ping Pong Ball" | Kim Deuk-hwan | | |
| 2018 | The Smile Has Left Your Eyes | Yang Kyung-mo | | |
| 2019 | Confession | Gi Choon-ho | | |
| 2019 | My Fellow Citizens! | Kang Soo-il | | |
| 2020 | Itaewon Class | Jang Dae-Hee | | |
| 2020 | Mystic Pop-up Bar | Jade Emperor (voice only) | | |
| 2021 | Vincenzo | Hong Yoo-chan | | |
| 2021 | Hospital Playlist 2 | Shin Seung-eui | Cameo (Episode 9) | |
| 2021 | Hometown | Choi Hyung-in | | |
| 2022 | Grid | Unknown person | Special appearance (1 episode) | |
| 2022 | Juvenile Justice | Um Joon-gi | Special appearance | |
| 2022 | The Sound of Magic | Na Il-deung's father | | |
| 2022 | Insider | Noh Young-guk | | |
| 2023 | Song of the Bandits | Choi Sung-soo | | |
| 2024 | No Way Out: The Roulette | Kim Guk-ho | | |
| 2025 | Tempest | Yoo Un-hak | | |
| 2025 | Love Me | Seo Jin-ho | | |
| TBA | Knock-Off | | | |
| TBA | The Fatherland and People | | | |

=== Television show ===
| Year | Title | Role | Notes | Ref. |
|---|---|---|---|---|
| 2025–2026 | Reply 1988 10th Anniversary | Cast member | | |

== Awards and nominations ==
| Year | Award | Category | Nominated work | Result | Ref. |
|---|---|---|---|---|---|
| 2018 | 54th Baeksang Arts Awards | Best Supporting Actor (TV) | Stranger | Nominated | |
| 2018 | 6th APAN Star Awards | Best Supporting Actor | Life | Won | |
| 2020 | 56th Baeksang Arts Awards | Best Supporting Actor (TV) | Itaewon Class | Nominated | |
| 2021 | 57th Baeksang Arts Awards | Best Supporting Actor (Film) | Voice of Silence | Nominated | |
| 2021 | 30th Buil Film Awards | Best Supporting Actor | Voice of Silence | Nominated | |
| 2025 | 61st Baeksang Arts Awards | Best Supporting Actor (Film) | Land of Happiness | Won | |
| 2025 | 34th Buil Film Awards | Best Supporting Actor | Land of Happiness | Nominated | |
