= The Day I Died: Unclosed Case =

South Korean crime drama film

- Theatrical release poster
- Hangul: 내가 죽던 날
- RR: Naega jukdeon nal
- MR: Naega chuktŏn nal
- Directed by: Park Ji-wan
- Screenplay by: Park Ji-wan
- Produced by: Jang Jin-seung; Gwon Nam-jin; Kim Han-gil
- Starring: Kim Hye-soo; Lee Jung-eun; Roh Jeong-eui
- Cinematography: Cho Yong-kyu
- Edited by: Kim Sang-bum; Jeong Gyeh-yeon
- Music by: Kim Hong-jib; Lee Jin-hui
- Production companies: Oscar 10 Studio; Story Pong
- Distributed by: Warner Bros. Pictures
- Release date: November 12, 2020
- Running time: 116 minutes
- Country: South Korea
- Language: Korean
- Box office: US$1.96 million

The Day I Died: Unclosed Case (Korean: 내가 죽던 날; RR: Naega jukdeon nal) is a 2020 South Korean mystery drama film directed by Park Ji-wan in her directorial debut. The film starring Kim Hye-soo, Lee Jung-eun and Roh Jeong-eui, is a mysterious story and about a missing girl supposedly died from a cliff on a dark stormy night. The film was released in theaters on November 12, 2020.

== Synopsis ==
It is a movie about Se-jin who disappeared to the edge of a cliff with only one suicide note left, a detective who tracks events on the edge of life, and an unspoken witness who reached out to them. Kim Hyeon-soo is assigned to investigate the case, but due to bad weather, the body of Se-jin can not been found and the case remains open. Se-jin's death is simply dismissed as a suicide by local detectives. Hyeon-soo has to find the truth behind the suspicious disappearance of the teenage girl.

== Cast ==
- Kim Hye-soo as Kim Hyeon-soo
- Lee Jung-eun as Suncheondaek
- Roh Jeong-eui as Se-jin
- Kim Sun-young Min-jeong
- Lee Sang-yeob as Hyeong-joon
- Moon Jeong-hee as Jeong-mi
- Shim So-young as Cheol-yi's mother
- Yoon Byung-hee
- Park Ji-hoon as Yong-jin
- Oh Se-young as Bakery shop clerk
- Kim Jung-young as Superior

== Production ==
Kim Hye-soo was confirmed to appear in June 2019. In August 2019, Lee Sang-yeop was cast in the film. The film was wrapped up in November, 2019. The distribution press conference was held on November 4, 2020, setting the way to release of the film.

== Release ==
The film was invited at 25th Bucheon International Fantastic Film Festival held in July, 2021 to compete in Bucheon Choice Features section. It was also invited at 23rd Seoul International Women's Film Festival in New Wave section and was screened on August 28, 2021.

== Reception ==
=== Box office ===
The film released on November 12, 2020, on 909 screens.

As of February 2, 2021, the film is at 25th place, with gross of US$1.91 million and 233,112 admissions, among all the Korean films released in the year 2020.

Admissions Based on the Integrated Computer Network for Cinema Admission Tickets
As of	Cumulative admissions	Ref.
February 2, 2021	234,322 persons	

Admissions (persons) as of respective weekend date
Week ending	Admissions (cumulative)	Notes
As of December 31, 2020	234 322	Weekend:1,210
As of December 6, 2020	232 354	Weekend:1,043
As of November 29, 2020	228,037	Weekend:4,347
As of November 22, 2020	212,986	
As of November 15, 2020	128,473	

=== Critical response ===
Going by Korean review aggregator Naver Movie Database, the film holds an approval rating of 9.07 from the audience.

== Awards and nominations ==
Year	Awards	Category	Recipient	Result	Ref.
2021	57th Baeksang Arts Awards	Best Actress	Kim Hye-soo	Nominated	
2021	57th Baeksang Arts Awards	Best Supporting Actress	Lee Jung-eun	Nominated	
2021	57th Baeksang Arts Awards	Best New Director	Park Ji-wan	Nominated	
2021	57th Baeksang Arts Awards	Best Screenplay	Park Ji-wan	Won	
2021	Chunsa Film Art Awards 2021	Best Screenplay	Park Ji-wan	Nominated	
2021	Chunsa Film Art Awards 2021	Best Supporting Actress	Lee Jung-eun	Nominated	
2021	42nd Blue Dragon Film Awards	Best Film	The Day I Died: Unclosed Case	Nominated	
2021	42nd Blue Dragon Film Awards	Best Actress	Kim Hye-soo	Nominated	
2021	42nd Blue Dragon Film Awards	Best Supporting Actress	Lee Jung-eun	Nominated	
2021	42nd Blue Dragon Film Awards	Best New Actress	Roh Jeong-eui	Nominated	
2021	42nd Blue Dragon Film Awards	Best New Director	Park Ji-wan	Won	
2021	42nd Blue Dragon Film Awards	Best Screenplay	Park Ji-wan	Nominated	
