= 30th Buil Film Awards =

2021 edition of award ceremony

- Awarded for: Excellence in cinematic achievements
- Awarded by: Busan Ilbo
- Presented by: Hwaseung Group
- Announced on: Nominations: August 25, 2021
- Presented on: October 7, 2021
- Site: Busan Exhibition and Convention Center, Haeundae-gu, Busan
- Official website: 2021 Buil Film Awards

Highlights
- Best Film: Escape from Mogadishu
- Buil Star of the Year Award: Jo In-sung (male); Esom (female)
- Best Direction: Lee Joon-ik; The Book of Fish
- Best Actor: Yoo Ah-in; Voice of Silence
- Best Actress: Jeon Jong-seo; The Call
- Best Supporting Actor: Huh Joon-ho; Escape from Mogadishu
- Best Supporting Actress: Kim Sun-young; Three Sisters
- Most awards: 6: Escape from Mogadishu
- Most nominations: 10: Escape from Mogadishu

Television coverage
- Network: MBC; Naver TV

The 30th Buil Film Awards (Korean: 제30회 부일영화상) ceremony is hosted by the Busan-based daily newspaper Busan Ilbo. It was held on October 7, 2021, at the Busan Exhibition and Convention Center (BEXCO Auditorium) in Busan. In addition to theater-released films, this year's nominations included Over-the-top (OTT) films such as the Netflix films The Call and Night in Paradise for the first time.

== Judging panel ==
The judging panel consisted of 9 members:

- Kang Nae-young: professor of Theater and Film Art at Kyungsung University
- Kim Sang-hoon: director of culture at Busan Ilbo
- Nam Dong-chul: program director of Busan International Film Festival
- Oh Dong-jin: organizing director of Wildflower Film Awards
- Yu Gina: film critic, professor of Film and Digital Media at Dongguk University
- Yoon Shin-ae: CEO of Studio 329 (produced Netflix series Extracurricular)
- Lee Moo-young: film director, professor of Film and Video at Dongseo University
- Jeon Chan-il: film critic, chairman of the Korean Cultural Content Critics Association
- Jeong Min-ah: film critic, professor of Theatre and Film at Sungkyul University

== Awards and nominations ==
Complete list of nominees:
Winners:

| Best Film | Best Director |
|---|---|
| Escape from Mogadishu; The Book of Fish; Moving On; Introduction; Voice of Silence | Lee Joon-ik – The Book of Fish; Ryoo Seung-wan – Escape from Mogadishu; Yoon Dan-bi – Moving On; Lee Seung-won – Three Sisters; Hong Eui-jeong – Voice of Silence |
| Best Actor | Best Actress |
| Yoo Ah-in – Voice of Silence as Tae-in; Uhm Tae-goo – Night in Paradise as Park Tae-goo; Kim Yoon-seok – Escape from Mogadishu as Han Shin-seong; Sul Kyung-gu – The Book of Fish as Jeong Yak-jeon; Byun Yo-han – The Book of Fish as Jang Chang-dae | Jeon Jong-seo – The Call as Oh Young-sook; Ye Soo-jung - An Old Lady as Shim Hyo-jeong; Jeon Yeo-been – Night in Paradise as Kim Jae-yeon; Go Ah-sung – Samjin Company English Class as Lee Ja-young; Moon So-ri – Three Sisters as Mi-yeon |
| Best Supporting Actor | Best Supporting Actress |
| Huh Joon-ho – Escape from Mogadishu as Rim Yong-su; Cha Seung-won – Night in Paradise as Ma Sang-gil; Koo Kyo-hwan – Escape from Mogadishu as Tae Joon-ki; Yoo Jae-myung – Voice of Silence as Chang-bok; Jo Woo-jin – The Book of Fish as Byeoljang | Kim Sun-young – Three Sisters as Hee-sook; Lee Jae-in – Hard Hit as Lee Hye-in; Yeom Hye-ran – Black Light as Yeong-nam; Esom – Samjin Company English Class as Jung Yoo-na; Lee Jung-eun – The Book of Fish as Gageodaek |
| Best New Director | Best Screenplay |
| Hong Eui-jeong – Voice of Silence; Kim Duk-joong – The Education; Yoon Dan-bi – Moving On; Lee Chung-hyun – The Call; Lim Seon-ae – An Old Lady | Lee Gi-cheol, Ryoo Seung-wan – Escape from Mogadishu; Kim Se-gyeom – The Book of Fish; Lee Seung-won – Three Sisters; Lim Seon-ae – An Old Lady; Hong Soo-young, Son Mi – Samjin Company English Class |
| Best New Actor | Best New Actress |
| Ha Jun – Festival as Kim Kyeong-man; Kim Jun-hyung – The Education as Hyun-mok; Park Seung-joon – Moving On as Dong-joo; Shin Seok-ho – Introduction as Young-ho; Hong Kyung –A Distant Place as Hyun-min | Lee Yoo-mi – Young Adult Matters as Se-jin; Moon Hye-in – The Education as Seong-hee; Ahn Hee-yeon – Young Adult Matters as Joo-young; Lim Sung-mi – Fighter as Jin-ah; Choi Jung-woon – Moving On as Ok-joo |
| Best Cinematography | Best Music |
| Choi Young-hwan - Escape from Mogadishu; Kim Young-ho - Night in Paradise; Park Jung-hoon - Voice of Silence; Byun Bong-sun - Space Sweepers; Lee Eui-tae - The Book of Fish | Bang Jun-seok - Escape from Mogadishu; Mowg - Night in Paradise; Dalpalan – Samjin Company English Class; Jang Hyuk-jin, Jang Yong-jin - Voice of Silence; Kim Tae-seong - Space Sweepers |
| Art/Technical Award | Popular Star Award |
| Jeong Seong-jin, Jeong Chol-min (VFX) - Space Sweepers; Kim Bo-mook (Production design) - Escape from Mogadishu; Yoon Dae-won (Martial arts) - Escape from Mogadishu; Bae Jeong-yoon (Production design) – Samjin Company English Class; Lee Jae-Sung (Production design) - The Book of Fish | Jo In-sung - Escape from Mogadishu; Esom - Samjin Company English Class |
Yu Hyun-mok Film Arts Award
Chun-yeon Lee

=== Films with multiple nominations ===
The following films received multiple nominations:

| Nominations | Films |
|---|---|
| 10 | Escape from Mogadishu |
| 9 | The Book of Fish |
| 7 | Voice of Silence |
| 5 | Night in Paradise |
| 5 | Moving On |
| 5 | Samjin Company English Class |
| 4 | Three Sisters |
| 3 | The Education |
| 3 | An Old Lady |
| 3 | Space Sweepers |
| 2 | Introduction |
| 2 | The Call |
| 2 | Young Adult Matters |
