= Voice of Silence (2020 film) =

2020 film by Hong Eui-jeong

- Theatrical release poster
- Hangul: 소리도 없이
- RR: Sorido eopsi
- MR: Sorido ŏpsi
- Directed by: Hong Eui-jeong
- Written by: Hong Eui-jeong
- Produced by: Lewis Taewan Kim; Afolabi Kuti; Kim Hyung-ok; Choi Moon-seok
- Starring: Yoo Ah-in; Yoo Jae-myung
- Cinematography: Park Jung-hoon
- Edited by: Han Mee-yeon
- Music by: Jang Hyuk-jin; Jang Yong-jin
- Production companies: Lewis Pictures; Broedmachine Productions; Broccoli Pictures
- Distributed by: Acemaker Movieworks
- Release date: October 15, 2020
- Running time: 99 minutes
- Country: South Korea
- Language: Korean
- Budget: $1.1 million
- Box office: $3.2 million

Voice of Silence (Korean: 소리도 없이; lit. 'Without A Sound') is a 2020 South Korean indie crime drama film written and directed by Hong Eui-jeong, from her screenplay which was selected as one of the top 12 projects at Venice Biennale College-Cinema 2016/2017 in 2016. It stars Yoo Ah-in and Yoo Jae-myung. The first feature directorial debut of Hong Eui-jeong, the film was premiered in South Korea on October 15, 2020. The film received almost universal critical acclaim, particularly for its dark comedy, social subtext, and performances. It won Cheval Noir Award for Best Film at the 2021 Fantasia International Film Festival and Best Film at the 2021 Busan Film Critics Awards.

== Plot ==
Tae-in, a young man who never speaks, and Chang-bok, a religious old man, work as the clean-up crew for a crime organization. One day, they receive an order from their immediate superior to take care of an eleven-year-old kidnapped girl Cho-hee for two days. The responsibility to take care of the girl falls upon the mute Tae-in who lives in the outback with a sister of a younger age than Cho-hee. The superior who does the activities behind the kingpin's back gets killed for it, and the duo does not know what to do with the girl.

== Cast ==
- Yoo Ah-in as Tae-in
- Yoo Jae-myung as Chang-bok
- Moon Seung-ah as Cho-hee
- Lee Ga-eun as Moon-ju
- Jo Ha-seok as Jung-han
- Seung Hyung-bae as Joon-cheol
- Im Kang-sung as Yong-seok
- Yoo Sung-joo as Il-gyu
- Kim Ja-yeong as Myung-hee
- Seo Dong-soo as Young-mook
- Kim Han-na as Han-sol
- Lee Hae-woon

== Production ==
=== Development ===
In 2016, it was revealed that director Hong Eui-jeong and BAFTA winning producer, Afolabi Kuti of Broedmachine, planned to collaborate on producing Hong's screenplay. The screenplay had been selected as one of the top 12 projects at Venice Biennale Collage-Cinema 2016/2017 and shortlisted for Sundance Screenwriters Lab (working title Without A Trace). In 2019, Lewis Pictures and Broccoli Pictures joined the production with Acemaker Movieworks distributing the film.

=== Casting ===
On June 3, 2019, Yoo Ah-in and Yoo Jae-myung joined the cast of the film, followed by two child actors, Moon Seung-ah and Lee Ga-eun, who joined the cast through auditions.

=== Filming ===
The read-through of the script occurred on July 19, 2019. Principal photography began on July 29, 2019. Filming took place in Gyeonggi Province and Gangwon Province and lasted less than two months on September 12, 2019.

== Release ==
Voice of Silence was released in local cinemas on October 15, 2020. It was previously screened at the Cannes International Film Festival's virtual market Marché du Film in June 2020. The film was also released in Taiwan, Singapore, Indonesia, The Philippines, and Japan. It was screened at a variety of international film festivals, including the Glasgow Film Festival, the Brussels International Fantastic Film Festival, the Fantasy Filmfest, the Far East Film Festival, the Fantasia International Film Festival, and the Transilvania International Film Festival among others.

== Reception ==
=== Box office ===
On its opening day in South Korea, Voice of Silence accumulated nearly 16,000 viewers, taking 31.1% of the box office and also taking the first place from Pawn at the box office. During the first weekend of its release, Voice of Silence garnered 220,395 viewers, securing the first place at the box office for its first weekend. Voice of Silence became the highest indie film opening after the outbreak of COVID-19 in South Korea. It has since clocked up 403,424 admissions in its home country.

=== Critical response ===
On Korean review aggregator Naver Movie Database, the film holds an approval rating of 7.94 from critic reviews. On Rotten Tomatoes, the film holds an approval rating of 100% from six reviews.

Rouven Linnarz from Asian Movie Pulse called it "a fascinating and quite gripping blend of drama and thriller", and wrote, "Hong Eui-jeong has created an ambitious piece of work, whose cast and aesthetics are just two aspects within a story that offers a rich, but also grim social subtext". Andrew Murray from The Upcoming wrote that the film was "fantastically mean-spirited when it comes to its humour [...] leading to amusing misunderstandings and shocking surprises. The result is a constantly twisting plot that will keep viewers gripped from beginning to end." Tyler Colosimo from The Movie Beat wrote, "Hong Eui-jeong's Voice of Silence brings a fresh behind-the-scenes perspective to the crime genre that explores the often unheard and unseen side of criminality. With excellent performances and intriguing drama told through a finely crafted veil of black comedy, Voice of Silence stands out as one of the best Korean films of the year". Jennie Kermode of Eye of Film was similarly positive and wrote, "Hong Eui-jeong directs with such assurance and such flair that it's hard to believe this is her first feature", and concluded, "Voice Of Silence will horrify you, charm you, make you laugh, thrill you and leave you on the brink of tears. This is the kind of work that cinema was invented for."

Nikki Baughan from Screen International called it, "a remarkable first feature from a talented new director who, one hopes, is only just beginning to find her own voice", and "a beautifully executed thriller which would be an impressive piece of work for any filmmaker, let alone one making her feature debut". Nick Allen of Roger Ebert wrote in his Fantasia International Film Festival review, "[...] an impressive feat far more nuanced than Hollywood would ever dare without making it a jokey affair," and although "the larger statement seems lost in the daredevil storytelling", still "[i]t's the sincere characters that linger, and the loving way they are presented", and concluded, "The movie is always genuine, just like its warming faith in people".

== Awards and nominations ==
| Year | Awards | Category | Recipient | Result | Ref. |
|---|---|---|---|---|---|
| 2020 | Cine 21 Awards | Best Film of the Year | Voice of Silence | 5th place | |
| 2020 | Cine 21 Awards | Best Actor | Yoo Ah-in | Won | |
| 2021 | 41st Blue Dragon Film Awards | Best Film | Voice of Silence | Nominated | |
| 2021 | 41st Blue Dragon Film Awards | Best Leading Actor | Yoo Ah-in | Won | |
| 2021 | 41st Blue Dragon Film Awards | Popular Star Award | Yoo Ah-in | Won | |
| 2021 | 41st Blue Dragon Film Awards | Best Screenplay | Hong Eui-jeong | Nominated | |
| 2021 | 41st Blue Dragon Film Awards | Best New Director | Hong Eui-jeong | Won | |
| 2021 | 57th Baeksang Arts Awards | Best Film | Voice of Silence | Nominated | |
| 2021 | 57th Baeksang Arts Awards | Best Actor (Film) | Yoo Ah-in | Won | |
| 2021 | 57th Baeksang Arts Awards | Best Supporting Actor (Film) | Yoo Jae-myung | Nominated | |
| 2021 | 57th Baeksang Arts Awards | Best Director (Film) | Hong Eui-jeong | Won | |
| 2021 | 57th Baeksang Arts Awards | Best Screenplay (Film) | Hong Eui-jeong | Nominated | |
| 2021 | 57th Baeksang Arts Awards | Best New Director (Film) | Hong Eui-jeong | Nominated | |
| 2021 | 23rd Far East Film Festival | White Mulberry Award | Voice of Silence | Nominated | |
| 2021 | 35th Fribourg International Film Festival | Regard d'or | Voice of Silence | Nominated | |
| 2021 | 25th Fantasia International Film Festival | Cheval Noir Award for Best Film | Voice of Silence | Won | |
| 2021 | 25th Fantasia International Film Festival | Cheval Noir Award for Best Actor | Yoo Ah-in | Won | |
| 2021 | 30th Buil Film Awards | Best Film | Voice of Silence | Nominated | |
| 2021 | 30th Buil Film Awards | Best Actor | Yoo Ah-in | Won | |
| 2021 | 30th Buil Film Awards | Best Supporting Actor | Yoo Jae-myung | Nominated | |
| 2021 | 30th Buil Film Awards | Best Director | Hong Eui-jeong | Nominated | |
| 2021 | 30th Buil Film Awards | Best New Director | Hong Eui-jeong | Won | |
| 2021 | 30th Buil Film Awards | Best Cinematography | Park Jung-hoon | Nominated | |
| 2021 | 30th Buil Film Awards | Best Music | Jang Hyuk-jin; Jang Yong-jin | Nominated | |
| 2021 | 15th Asian Film Awards | Best Actor | Yoo Ah-in | Won | |
| 2021 | 15th Asian Film Awards | Best Screenplay | Hong Eui-jeong | Nominated | |
| 2021 | 15th Asian Film Awards | Best New Director | Hong Eui-jeong | Won | |
| 2021 | 41st Korean Association of Film Critics Awards | Best New Director | Hong Eui-jeong | Won | |
| 2021 | 41st Korean Association of Film Critics Awards | Top 10 Films | Voice of Silence | Won | |
| 2021 | 26th Chunsa International Film Festival | Best Actor | Yoo Ah-in | Nominated | |
| 2021 | 26th Chunsa International Film Festival | Best Screenplay | Hong Eui-jeong | Nominated | |
| 2021 | 26th Chunsa International Film Festival | Best New Director | Hong Eui-jeong | Nominated | |
| 2021 | 6th Asia Artist Awards | Grand Prize - Actor of the Year (Film) | Yoo Ah-in | Won | |
| 2021 | 6th Asia Artist Awards | Asia Celebrity Award (Actor) | Yoo Ah-in | Won | |
| 2021 | 22nd Busan Film Critics Awards | Best Film | Voice of Silence | Won | |
| 2021 | 22nd Busan Film Critics Awards | Best Screenplay | Hong Eui-jeong | Won | |
| 2021 | 8th Korean Film Producers Association Awards | Best New Director | Hong Eui-jeong | Won | |
| 2022 | 20th Director's Cut Awards | Best Actor (Film) | Yoo Ah-in | Nominated | |
| 2022 | 20th Director's Cut Awards | Best Director (Film) | Hong Eui-jeong | Nominated | |
| 2022 | 20th Director's Cut Awards | Best Screenplay (Film) | Hong Eui-jeong | Nominated | |
| 2022 | 20th Director's Cut Awards | Best New Director (Film) | Hong Eui-jeong | Won | |
