= Samjin Company English Class =

2020 South Korean comedy-drama film

- Theatrical release poster
- Hangul: 삼진그룹 영어토익반
- RR: Samjin geurup yeongeo Toikban
- MR: Samjin kŭrup yŏngŏ T'oikpan
- Directed by: Lee Jong-pil
- Written by: Hong Soo-young; Son Mi
- Produced by: Park Eun-kyung
- Starring: Go Ah-sung; Esom; Park Hye-su
- Cinematography: Park Se-seung
- Edited by: Heo Sun-mi; Jo Han-ul
- Music by: Dalpalan
- Production company: The LAMP
- Distributed by: Lotte Entertainment
- Release date: October 21, 2020
- Running time: 110 minutes
- Country: South Korea
- Languages: Korean; English
- Box office: US$12.8 million

Samjin Company English Class (Korean: 삼진그룹 영어토익반; lit. 'Samjin Group English TOEIC Class') is a 2020 South Korean comedy-drama film directed by Lee Jong-pil, starring Go Ah-sung, Esom and Park Hye-su. It was released on October 21, 2020.

== Plot ==
In 1995, three female employees at Samjin Company are offered the opportunity for promotion if they achieve a score of at least 600 on the TOEIC test and therefore enroll in English classes. Lee Ja-young from the production management department, Jung Yu-na from the marketing department, and Shim Bo-ram from the accounting department joined the company straight out of high school and remain in low-level positions despite eight years of service and possessing considerable practical experience. One day, Ja-young notices polluted wastewater leaking from a factory to which she has been assigned. A fan of mystery novels, she decides to investigate, and Yu-na and Bo-ram join her in uncovering what illegal activities their company may be involved in. The challenge for them is to discover and expose the truth without losing their jobs.

== Cast ==
- Go Ah-sung as Lee Ja-young
- Esom as Jung Yoo-na
- Park Hye-su as Shim Bo-ram
- Cho Hyun-chul as Choi Dong-soo
- Kim Jong-soo as Bong Hyun-chul
- Kim Won-hae as Ahn Gi-chang
- Bae Hae-sun as Ban Eun-kyung
- David Lee McInnis as Billy Park
- Baek Hyun-jin as Oh Tae-young
- Lee Sung-wook as Hong Soo-chul
- Choi Soo-im as Jo Min-jung
- Jung Yi-seo as Audit office employee
- Lee Joo-young as Song So-ra
- Tyler Rasch as English instructor

== Production ==
Principal photography began in late October 2019.

== Release ==
The film was theatrically released on October 21, 2020.

It was invited at the 20th New York Asian Film Festival. It was featured in 'Standouts' strand and screened at Lincoln Center and SVA Theatre in the two-week festival held from August 6 to 22, 2021 in New York.

== Reception ==
=== Box office ===
The film topped the South Korean box office for six days following its release.

=== Accolades ===
Year	Award	Category	Recipient(s)	Result	Ref.
2020	Women in Film Korea Festival	Technical Award	Bae Jung-yoon	Won	
2021	41st Blue Dragon Film Awards	Best Supporting Actress	Park Hye-su	Nominated	
2021	41st Blue Dragon Film Awards	Best Supporting Actress	Esom	Won	
2021	41st Blue Dragon Film Awards	Best Art Direction	Bae Jung-yoon	Won	
2021	41st Blue Dragon Film Awards	Best Music	Dalpalan	Won	
2021	41st Blue Dragon Film Awards	Technical Award	Yoon Jeong-hee (Costume Design)	Nominated	
2021	57th Baeksang Arts Awards	Best Film	Samjin Company English Class	Won	
2021	57th Baeksang Arts Awards	Best Director	Lee Jong-pil	Nominated	
2021	57th Baeksang Arts Awards	Best Screenplay	Lee Jong-pil	Nominated	
2021	57th Baeksang Arts Awards	Best Actress	Go Ah-sung	Nominated	
2021	57th Baeksang Arts Awards	Best Supporting Actress	Esom	Nominated	
2021	26th Chunsa Film Art Awards	Best Director	Lee Jong-pil	Nominated	
2021	26th Chunsa Film Art Awards	Best Screenplay	Lee Jong-pil	Won	
2021	26th Chunsa Film Art Awards	Best Actress	Go Ah-sung	Nominated	
2021	26th Chunsa Film Art Awards	Best Supporting Actress	Esom	Nominated	
2021	30th Buil Film Awards	Best Actress	Go Ah-sung	Nominated	
2021	30th Buil Film Awards	Best Supporting Actress	Esom	Nominated	
2021	30th Buil Film Awards	Popular Star Award	Esom	Won	
2021	30th Buil Film Awards	Best Screenplay	Lee Jong-pil	Nominated	
2021	30th Buil Film Awards	Best Music Award	Dalpalan	Nominated	
2021	30th Buil Film Awards	Best Art/Technical Award	Bae Jeong-yoon	Nominated	
