= Night in Paradise (2020 film) =

2021 South Korean drama film

- Official release poster
- Hangul: 낙원의 밤
- Hanja: 樂園의 밤
- RR: Nagwonui bam
- MR: Nagwŏnŭi pam
- Directed by: Park Hoon-jung
- Written by: Park Hoon-jung
- Produced by: Park Hoon-jung
- Starring: Uhm Tae-goo; Jeon Yeo-been; Cha Seung-won; Lee Ki-young; Park Ho-san
- Cinematography: Kim Young-ho
- Edited by: Jang Rae-won
- Music by: Mowg
- Production companies: Goldmoon Film; Peppermint & Company
- Distributed by: Next Entertainment World; Netflix
- Release dates: September 3, 2020 (Venice); April 9, 2021 (South Korea)
- Running time: 131 minutes
- Country: South Korea
- Language: Korean

Night in Paradise (Korean: 낙원의 밤; RR: Nagwonui bam) is a 2020 South Korean neo-noir crime film written and directed by Park Hoon-jung, starring Uhm Tae-goo, Jeon Yeo-been and Cha Seung-won. It had its world premiere on September 3, 2020, at the 77th Venice International Film Festival and was released on April 9, 2021 on Netflix.

== Plot ==
It tells the story of Tae-gu, a mobster who refuses an offer to switch sides with his rival Bukseong gang, headed by Chairman Doh. In retaliation, Tae-gu's sister and niece are murdered, causing him to seek revenge by brutally killing Chairman Doh and his men before fleeing to Jeju Island. There, he meets Jae-yeon, a terminally ill woman, and her arms dealer uncle, Kuto.

Meanwhile, Tae-gu's boss, Chairman Yang, plans to wipe out the remaining Bukseong Gang's lieutenants to end the gang forever. However, the plan fails without Tae-gu's leadership and efficiency, and Director Ma of the Bukseong gang hunts down Tae-gu mercilessly to seek revenge. Yang is forced to betray Tae-gu by handing him over to the Bukseong gang to save his own life. Kuto is killed during a firefight against his buyers, and Tae-gu and Jae-yeon go on the run.

Tae-gu is later betrayed by Yang and subjected to brutal torture by Director Ma's men. Ma reveals that Yang ordered the killing of Tae-gu's sister and niece, fearing Tae-gu's defection to the Bukseong gang, which would have left Yang powerless. Enraged, Tae-gu attacks Yang but is ultimately killed by Ma's men, with the killing blow dealt by Yang. Jae-yeon is released as per Tae-gu's end of the deal, but she seeks revenge by ambushing the gangsters at the restaurant where she and Tae-gu first met. Cornered, Ma accepts his fate and is killed. She then commits suicide on the beach. The film ends with a loud bang in the background.

== Cast ==
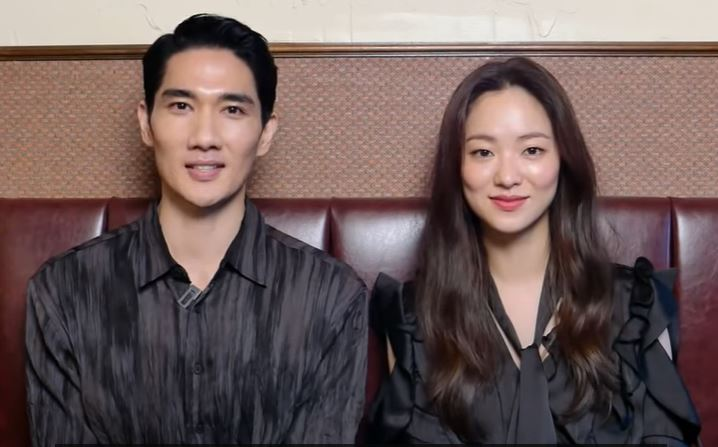
Uhm Tae-goo and Jeon Yeo-been during an interview with Marie Claire Korea

- Uhm Tae-goo as Park Tae-goo
- Jeon Yeo-been as Kim Jae-yeon
- Cha Seung-won as Ma Sang-gil
- Lee Ki-young as Kuto
- Park Ho-san as Yang Do-soo
- Cho Dong-in as Jin-sung
- Kim Ho-jun as gangster
- Jang Young-nam as Jae-kyung (Tae-goo's sister)
- Son Byong-ho as Chairman Doh
- Lee Moon-sik as Captain Park

== Release ==
The film premiered at the 77th Venice International Film Festival on September 3, 2020, where it was screened in the "Out of Competition" category.

In mid-October 2020, it was reported that Next Entertainment World might skip the theatrical release and debut the film on Netflix due to the COVID-19 pandemic. In mid-February 2021, it was announced that the film would be released on the streaming platform on April 9.

== Reception ==
On the review aggregator website Rotten Tomatoes, 68% of 19 critics' reviews are positive, with an average rating of 6.8/10. Metacritic, which uses a weighted average, assigned the film a score of 59 out of 100, based on 6 critics, indicating "mixed or average" reviews.

Deborah Young of The Hollywood Reporter stated that "Night in Paradise contains a lot of good plotting, several amusing characters and a decent array of exciting action scenes and bloodshed. But it is indulgently long, even within scenes, like the needlessly protracted opening explosion that sets the story in motion." In another mixed review, Jonathan Romney of Screen Daily noted that "Addicts of Asian gangster action will relish, but the odd mix of hardcore viscerality and ruminative borderline-sentiment could limit the film's appeal."

James Mottram of the South China Morning Post listed Night in Paradise as one of the 10 best films screened at the 2020 Venice International Film Festival, saying that "there was nothing quite as thrilling as [the film]" and that its "extravagant set pieces and shoot-outs [will] sate any genre hound." Alberto Barbera, director of the Venice Festival, also gave a positive review: "Night in Paradise is one of the best gangster movies coming from South Korean cinema in recent years. Park Hoon-jung is a director that deserves full attention for his ability to combine the writing of original screenplays with the creation of complex characters that are never stereotypical, together with impressive and masterly directorial skills. His name will certainly be heard even more in the future."

== Awards and nominations ==
Year	Award	Category	Recipient	Result	Ref.
2021	42nd Blue Dragon Film Awards	Best Director	Park Hoon-jung	Nominated	
2021	30th Buil Film Awards	Best Actor	Uhm Tae-goo	Nominated	
2021	30th Buil Film Awards	Best Actress	Jeon Yeo-been	Nominated	
2021	30th Buil Film Awards	Best Supporting Actor	Cha Seung-won	Nominated	
2021	30th Buil Film Awards	Best Cinematography	Kim Young-ho	Nominated	
2021	30th Buil Film Awards	Best Music	Mowg	Nominated	
2021	26th Chunsa Film Art Awards	Best Supporting Actor	Cha Seung-won	Nominated	
