= Beasts Clawing at Straws =

2020 South Korean crime thriller film

- Official release poster
- Hangul: 지푸라기라도 잡고 싶은 짐승들
- RR: Jipuragirado japgo sipeun jimseungdeul
- MR: Chip'uragirado chapko sip'ŭn chimsŭngdŭl
- Directed by: Kim Yong-hoon
- Written by: Kim Yong-hoon
- Based on: Beasts Clawing at Straws by Keisuke Sone
- Produced by: Kim Jin-sun
- Starring: Jeon Do-yeon; Jung Woo-sung; Bae Seong-woo; Jung Man-sik; Jin Kyung; Shin Hyun-been; Jung Ga-ram; Youn Yuh-jung
- Cinematography: Kim Tae-sung
- Edited by: Han Mi-yeon
- Music by: Nene Kang
- Production company: B.A. Entertainment
- Distributed by: Megabox Plus M
- Release dates: January 25, 2020 (IFFR); February 19, 2020 (South Korea)
- Running time: 108 minutes
- Country: South Korea
- Language: Korean
- Box office: US$5.8 million

Beasts Clawing at Straws (Korean: 지푸라기라도 잡고 싶은 짐승들, Japanese: 藁にもすがる獣たち Wara ni mo sugaru kemonotachi) is a 2020 South Korean neo-noir black comedy crime thriller film written and directed by Kim Yong-hoon as his debut feature film. Based on the 2011 Japanese novel of the same name by Keisuke Sone, it features an ensemble cast led by Jeon Do-yeon and Jung Woo-sung.

The film had its world premiere at the Tiger Competition of the 49th International Film Festival Rotterdam on January 25, 2020, where it won the Special Jury Award. It was released in South Korea on February 19.

== Plot ==
The film is separated into six chapters: Debt, Sucker, Food Chain, Shark, Lucky Strike, and Money Bag.

Joong-man, stuck in a thankless job and forced to care for his ailing mother, finds a huge bag of money left in a sauna locker. Tae-young, a customs officer in debt to criminal Mr. Park, plots with one of Park's henchmen to run a lucrative scam on a "sucker" attempting to flee the country. Mi-ran, an escort with an abusive husband, finally sees a way out when one of her clients offers to murder him in exchange for a cut of his life insurance policy.

The three characters all cross paths with dangerous people and get into increasingly deeper trouble as they attempt to cheat their way toward the ultimate payout. In the end, Joong-man loses his house due to a fire set by Yeon-hee to cover up her murder of Park to get the money. Afterwards, Yeon-hee is killed by Park's lieutenant to avenge his boss. She drops the key for the locker that contains her bag of money. Joong-man's wife, who works as a cleaning lady at the airport, finds the key and retrieves the money, enabling Joong-man to restart his life.

== Cast ==
- Jeon Do-yeon as Yeon-hee
- Jung Woo-sung as Tae-young
- Youn Yuh-jung as Soon-ja
- Bae Seong-woo as Joong-man
- Shin Hyun-been as Mi-ran
- Jung Man-sik as Park Doo-man
- Jin Kyung as Young-sun
- Jung Ga-ram as Jin-tae
- Bae Jin-woong as Catfish
- Heo Dong-won as Manager
- Shim So-young as Flower shop owner
- Kim Jun-han as Jae-hoon
- Park Ji-hwan as Carp
- Yoon Je-moon as Myung-goo

== Production ==
=== Development ===
Japanese author Keisuke Sone, who wrote the novel on which the film is based, "is a fan of Korean films" and "was very welcoming" to the idea of a film adaptation according to director Kim Yong-hoon.

=== Casting ===
Director Kim Yong-hoon first showed his script to actress Jeon Do-yeon who accepted the offer and convinced Youn Yuh-jung to join the cast.

=== Filming ===
Principal photography began on August 30, 2018, and filming ended on November 30.

== Release ==
Due to the COVID-19 pandemic, the film was postponed by a week (being released on February 19, 2020, instead of February 12), but the delay had little impact as the situation did not improve by then.

== Reception ==
=== Critical response ===
On the review aggregation website Rotten Tomatoes, the film holds an approval rating of 94% based on 35 reviews, with an average rating of 7.6/10.

Jay Weissberg of Variety said that "Beasts Clawing at Straws could just as well be called "Beasts Toying with Clichés" if it weren't such an amusing, echt Korean romp." For Neil Young of The Hollywood Reporter, "Beasts Clawing at Straws demands attention and patience, but thus happily ends up amply rewarding both." Wendy Ide of Screen International describes the film as an "almost Coen-sian tale of ordinary folks undone by greed [which] is a lot smarter than its occasionally crude execution would have you believe."

=== Accolades ===
Year	Award	Category	Recipient(s)	Result	Ref.
2020	49th International Film Festival Rotterdam	Tiger Competition – Special Jury Award	Beasts Clawing at Straws	Won	
2020	22nd Far East Film Festival	Special Honorable Mention - White Mulberry Award	Beasts Clawing at Straws	Won	
2020	29th Buil Film Awards	Best Actor	Jung Woo-sung	Nominated	
2020	29th Buil Film Awards	Best Actress	Jeon Do-yeon	Nominated	
2020	40th Korean Association of Film Critics Awards	Top 10 Films	Beasts Clawing at Straws	Won	
2020	10th AACTA Awards	Best Asian Film	Beasts Clawing at Straws	Nominated	
2020	7th Korean Film Producers Association Awards	Best Editing	Han Mi-yeon	Won	
2020	Cine 21 Awards	Best Producer	Jang Won-seok	Won	
2021	41st Blue Dragon Film Awards	Best Leading Actress	Jeon Do-yeon	Nominated	
2021	41st Blue Dragon Film Awards	Best New Actress	Shin Hyun-been	Nominated	
2021	41st Blue Dragon Film Awards	Best Editing	Han Mi-yeon	Won	

== See also ==
- List of 2020 box office number-one films in South Korea
