= Yoo Ah-in =

South Korean actor (born 1986)

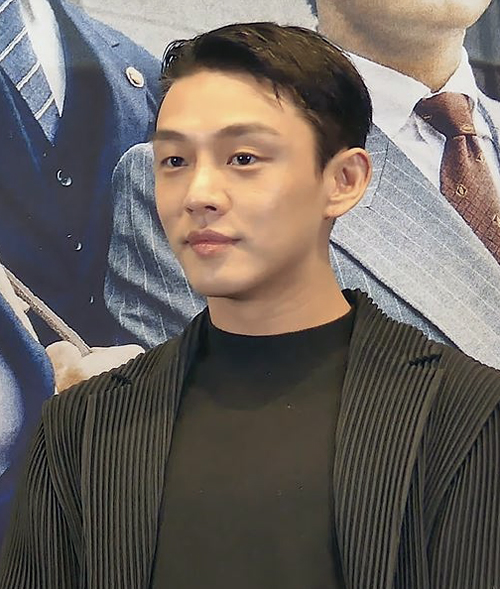
- Yoo in 2018
- Born: Uhm Hong-sik; October 6, 1986 (age 40); Nam District, Daegu, South Korea
- Occupations: Actor; creative director; gallerist
- Years active: 2003–present
- Agents: Star K; United Artists Agency
- Height: 179 cm (5 ft 10 in)

Korean name
- Hangul: 엄홍식
- Hanja: 嚴弘植
- RR: Eom Hongsik
- MR: Ŏm Hongsik

Stage name
- Hangul: 유아인
- Hanja: 劉亞仁
- RR: Yu Ain
- MR: Yu Ain

Uhm Hong-sik (Korean: 엄홍식; born October 6, 1986), known professionally as Yoo Ah-in (Korean: 유아인), is a South Korean actor, creative director, and gallerist. As an actor, he is known for his roles in Punch (2011), Secret Affair (2014), Veteran (2015), The Throne (2015), Six Flying Dragons (2015–2016), Burning (2018), #Alive (2020), Voice of Silence (2020), and Hellbound (2021). He is the recipient of various accolades, including two Blue Dragon Film Awards and two Baeksang Arts Awards. He ranked 2nd on the 2016 Forbes Korea Power Celebrity list.

== Early life ==
Yoo was born in Nam District, Daegu in southeastern South Korea, the youngest of three children. In the first year at Gyeongbuk Arts High School, majoring in fine arts, Yoo was discovered by a casting agent on the streets in front of the school. He traveled to Seoul by himself and began living independently, which he said developed into a personal asset. He was enrolled in Seoul Arts High School, but soon dropped out of school to carry on his broadcast activities. Yoo later entered Dankuk University and Konkuk University, having completed a GED for high school certification. Before debuting, he was once scouted to be a K-Pop idol and trained to sing.

== Career ==
=== 2003–2005: Career beginnings and hiatus ===
Yoo made his debut in a TV commercial in 2003. His first management wanted to create an attractive stage name for him that fit an idol image because the name Uhm Hong-sik was considered too heavy and old fashioned. He then chose Yoo Ah-in, Ah-in taken from the German word meaning "one".

Yoo was then cast in the teen series Sharp after auditioning, playing the role of a model student majoring in painting. After the series aired, Yoo gained popularity and was cast in romance drama April Kiss and one-act drama Shi-eun & Soo-ha. Yoo also appeared in various commercials including school uniforms and youth apparel.

After that, however, Yoo took a break from acting and disappeared from the spotlight. According to Yoo, he became an actor without any prior knowledge about acting and entertainment industry. At first, he was thrilled by the accolades and popularity of the profession, but then became confused about whether or not that was what he truly desired in life. Yoo felt the need for a hiatus to reflect upon what he wanted for himself instead of catering to others, and what kind of path as an actor he would want to take in the future. Having taken the time for introspection, he discovered his passion for serious acting. Yoo recalls of his career beginnings:

During Sharp, I had no idea what was happening to me, and I didn't know how to deal with it, so the popularity didn't feel like it was mine. Now, I can handle it better. After Sharp, I remember thinking that I must not falter and collapse under the situation I was thrust into, and that I had to firmly take a step forward and wait.

=== 2006–2009: Film debut ===
Resuming his acting career, Yoo starred in low-budget indie film Boys of Tomorrow, taking over the role of a young man Jong-dae, who carries the psychological scars of a traumatic childhood accident. The film premiered at Busan International Film Festival in October 2006, and competed for the Golden Leopard at the 2007 Locarno International Film Festival. He said about the meaning of his first film, "If I have drawn a picture of the actor career, this film must be within that picture." Director Noh Dong-seok met Yoo when he couldn't make up his mind even though he has met several actors interested in the role of Jong-dae. Noh decided to cast Yoo within five minutes of meeting him, saying, "I can't forget the first five minutes I met Yoo at the audition. When I asked other actors about Jong-dae character, they usually answered, 'I think he's going to wear something, have some hairstyle and some kind of personality'. But he stared out the window for a long time, and suddenly said one word as if he choked up slightly, 'It's sad.' At that moment, I thought, 'Jong-dae is him.'" During the film's press junket, Noh said, "In contrast to his noticeably good looks, he was filled with a furious energy. When I hear the word 'youth,' I think of Yoo Ah-in. The true main character of this movie, I think, is [not Jong-dae but] Yoo Ah-in." Noh also recalled Yoo's audition in an interview, saying, "I fell for Yoo Ah-in at first sight. Of course, he also had good looks. But he had an extremely different feel from the other actors whom I had met during casting. Yoo Ah-in was nervous when he met me. Before his identity as an actor, he possessed twenty years of his natural self as Yoo Ah-in." Yoo's role as a boy looking for a gun in order to escape from his frustrating reality earned positive reviews, and he won the Best New Actor award at the Busan Film Critics Awards. Yoo then starred in Jeong Yoon-cheol's black comedy film Skeletons in the Closet, playing the role of an eccentric boy who believes he was a king in previous incarnation. Yoo was nominated at the Blue Dragon Film Awards.

In 2008, Yoo starred in historical drama Strongest Chil Woo, playing a cruel but lonely assassin adopted by a nobleman. He gained recognition from critics and viewers for his performance, despite it being the first historical drama for him. He was also featured in Min Kyu-dong's comedy-drama film Antique, adapted from Yoshinaga Fumi's manga Antique Bakery. For his role as a patisserie aspirant and former boxer, Yoo took boxing and baking classes. Min purposefully gave Yoo long sets of lines in the film, saying that Yoo already knew exactly how to act with rhythm, "No matter how long his lines were, just one sentence could tell you how good his rhythm was." And, "Most rookie actors wait around for their turn in the script and then get so nervous that they mess up their first lines and everything else completely falls apart, but Yoo Ah-in got it done in one stroke of the knife. That's why I purposefully gave him long sets of lines. He's an actor whose talent is most evident in long takes and full shots." Yoo received the Best New Actor award at the Director's Cut Awards and emerged as one of the most promising actors in Korean film industry. In 2009, he was cast in romance drama He Who Can't Marry, as cheeky assistant who works at the architectural office, portraying the bright side of being in one's twenties. He next starred in the film Sky and Ocean as a pizza delivery man who strives to make his own livelihood.

=== 2010–2013: Rising popularity and breakthrough ===
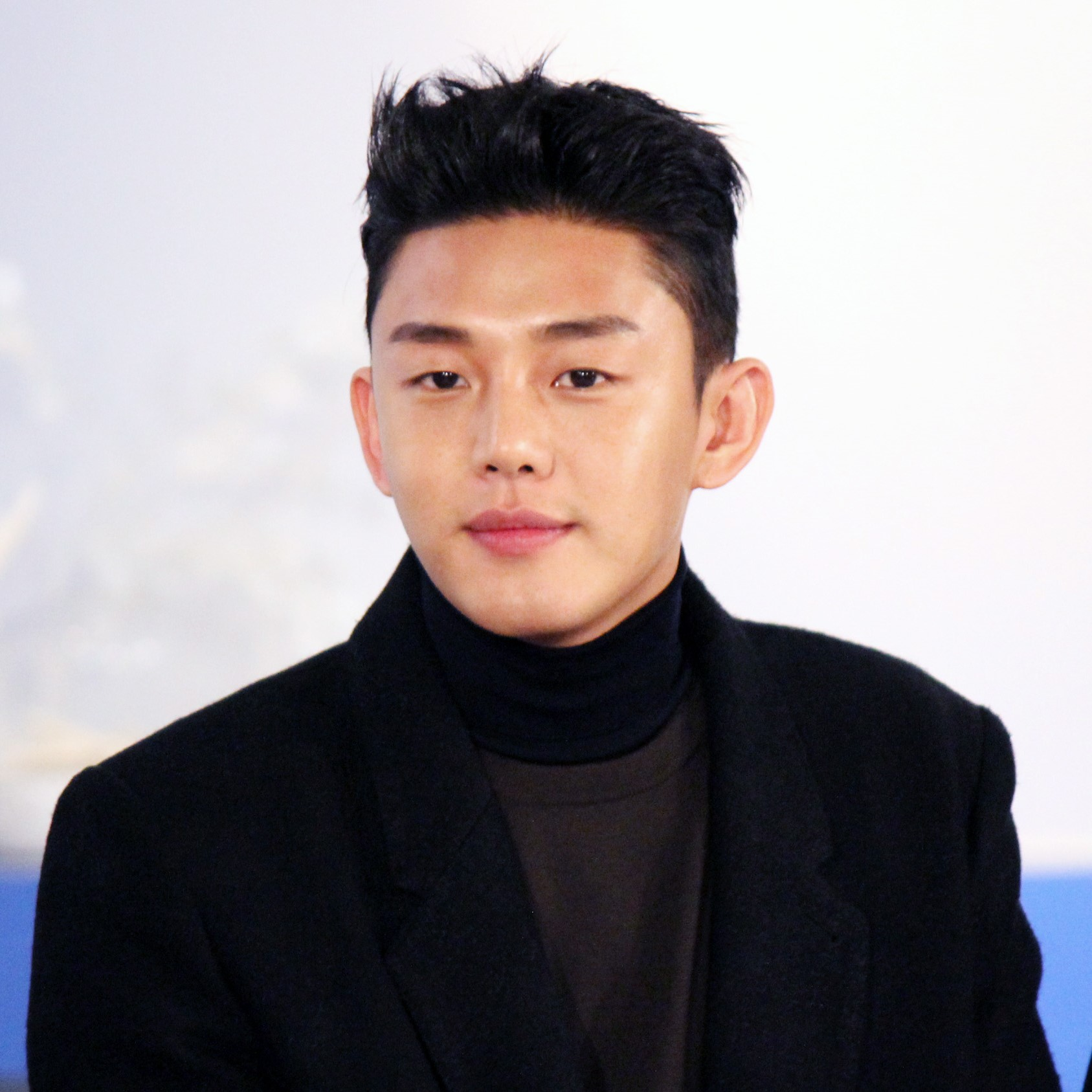
Yoo at the Busan International Film Festival in October 2013

Yoo's rise to fame came in 2010, when he acted in fusion period drama Sungkyunkwan Scandal, adapted from a book with the same title. Yoo became famous due to the drama's popularity. He played the role of an unpredictable man who moonlights to reveal the corruption of rich nobles. Yoo's popularity was later referred to as "Geol-oh-al-yee" (Geol-oh fever), coined after the name of his character. The drama's scriptwriter Kim Tae-heui said in her interview, "[t]he most charming character in the book was Geol-oh but I don't think I'm cut out exactly for portraying such raw and rough male character. That's how my Geol-oh is more sensitive and less in words compared to other characters. This combined with additional interpretation of actor Yoo Ah-in who happens to be a very sentimental actor, the Geol-oh in the drama became someone completely different from the original story."

In 2011, he played a leading role of biracial teenager in the coming-of-age film Punch, a critical and commercial hit. The film premiered at the 2011 Busan International Film Festival, and competed for Crystal Bear at the Berlin International Film Festival. His co-star, veteran actor Kim Yoon-seok praised him that "In the next 10 years, he will be one of the biggest names in Korean cinema." Yoo was nominated at the Buil Film Awards, his first nomination for the Best Actor category.

The next year, Yoo starred in drama Fashion King, taking over the role of a self-made but obsessed-with-success fashion businessman. The drama portrays the love and success of young people, but poorly received due to its weak narrative and controversial ending. Still, he described his joining the project as an adventurous and satisfying step as he was able to play a character with worldly desires. Cast as King Sukjong in the 2013 period drama Jang Ok-jung, Living by Love, a revisionist take on infamous royal concubine Jang Hui-bin. Yoo called the role one of the biggest challenges of his career and he garnered favorable press reviews for his mature, charismatic and versatile portrayal of Sukjong. He then played the titular character in the film Tough as Iron, about a Busan pier worker who takes care of his mother afflicted with dementia and kidney disease. Yoo and Tough as Iron co-star, Jung Yu-mi later collaborated again as voice actors in the animated film The Satellite Girl and Milk Cow.

=== 2014–2017: Acclaim in film and television ===
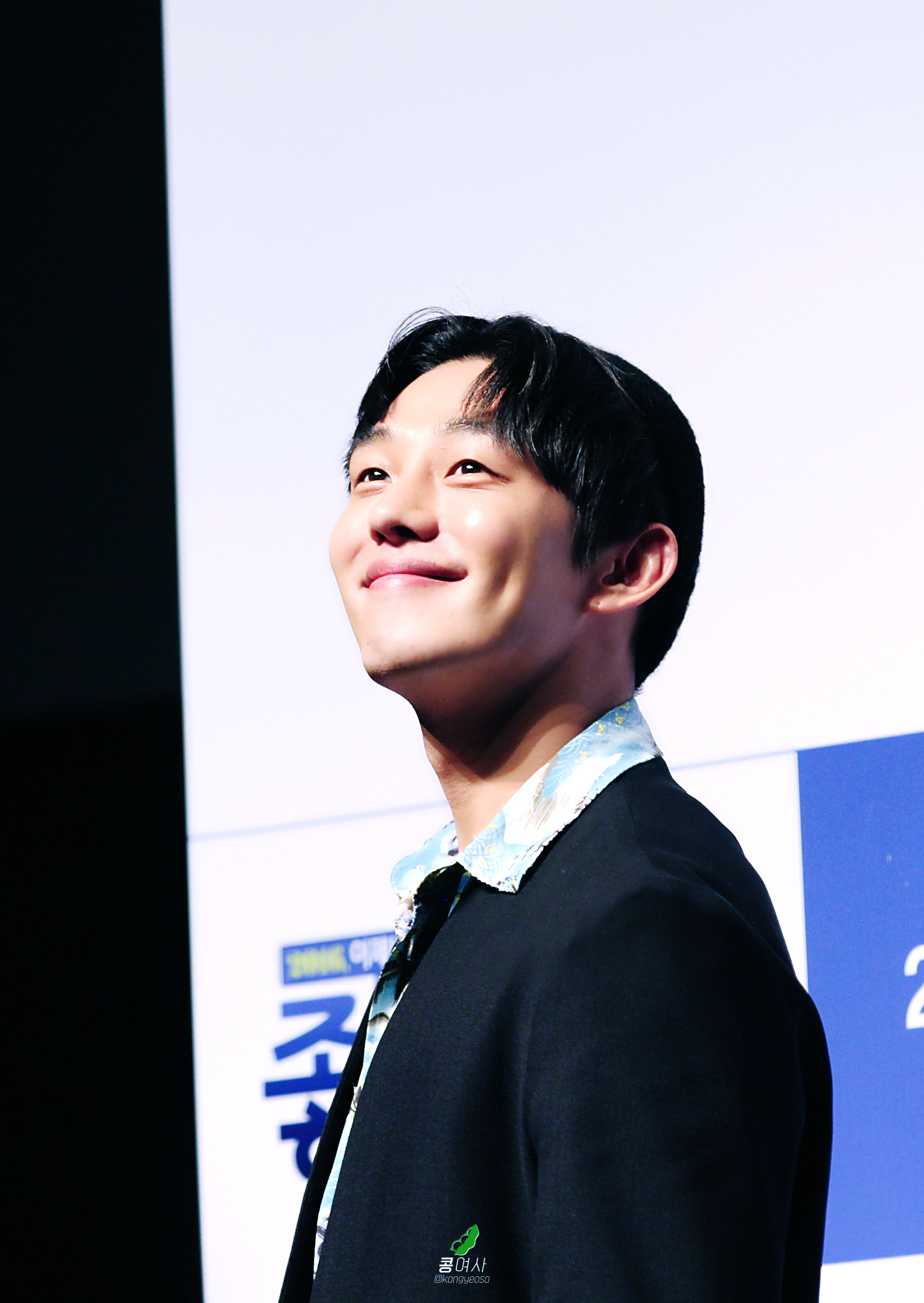
Yoo at the fan event screening of Like for Likes in February 2016

In 2014, Yoo appeared as a quirky supporting role in Lee Han's Thread of Lies (this was Lee's second film adaptation of a Kim Ryeo-ryeong novel after Punch). This was followed by a leading role in cable melodrama Secret Affair (Secret Love Affair), in which Yoo played a poor piano prodigy in love with his married, much older teacher. To prepare for his role, Yoo practiced the piano and listened to classical music. The drama occupied the number one ratings slot throughout its run and became the highest rated general cable drama of the year. Due to his popularity, Yoo was dubbed as "kukmin yeonha-nam" (the nation's younger boyfriend). Yoo garnered favorable press reviews for his delicate, three-dimensional and passionate portrayal of a genius pianist. 10 Asia praised, "Secret Affair is Yoo Ah-in's turning point in acting. He makes the affair looks so irresistible and concrete, he makes the viewers sympathize for his forbidden love and follow his journey till all hell breaks loose." And, "His piano concerto scene will be the talk of the town for a long time and is worth lasting memory."

In 2015, Yoo starred in two top-grossing films. He played an amoral young millionaire who faces off with a detective in Ryoo Seung-wan's crime thriller/comedy Veteran with Hwang Jung-min and Yoo Hae-jin among the cast, and as the tragic Crown Prince Sado in Lee Joon-ik's period drama The Throne alongside Song Kang-ho. Veteran became one of the highest-grossing films in South Korea and The Throne was South Korea's submission for the Academy Awards for Best Foreign Language Film. Ryoo Seung-wan described Yoo's character in Veteran as "more like James Cagney's characters", and praised Yoo's take on his first character as a ruthless chaebol, "He was more interested and active in expressing this villain character. We were more like supplementing each other rather than one guiding the other." And, "Yoo Ah-in's character being like a boy made this character even more special. If you watch James Cagney's movies, his characters have this childish side; Yoo Ah-in doesn't have it, so that's what makes it even more scary. It's something that not even Lee Marvin can make." Lee Joon-ik said he hand-picked Yoo and wrote the Crown Prince Sado character for Yoo after watching Punch, "When I watched Punch, I already saw Sado's heart in Yoo Ah-in. He's an actor with so much dissatisfaction and anxiety, who has an internal flame bottled up inside", and, "He showed the essence of people in their 20s." For his roles in both Veteran and The Throne, Yoo received Best Actor awards at influential film awards including Blue Dragon Awards, Korean Film Reporters Association Awards, Chunsa Film Art Awards, and Golden Cinematography Awards. The same year, he was named Film Actor of the Year by Gallup Korea and ranked number two on Korea Power Celebrity 40 by Forbes.

Yoo was then cast in the historical drama Six Flying Dragons, reuniting with Fashion King co-star Shin Se-kyung. The drama occupied the number one ratings slot throughout its run. Yoo's portrayal of ambitious prince Taejong of Joseon won him Best Actor in the TV Category at the Baeksang Arts Awards. Due to his success in both film and television, the entertainment media coined 2015 the "A-in-shi-dae" (Ah-in Era). The following year, Yoo played a Korean wave star in ensemble cast film Like for Likes, his first romantic comedy since his debut. This was also his first film directed by a woman. Yoo said of his desire to work on the film, "I discussed the topic of feminism with the director. This film depicts the stereotypical perception of women that is deeply rooted in Korean society. When a man articulates his opinion, he is considered as cool and having self-confidence, but when a woman does the same she is called overly opinionated. This part went straight to my heart."

For his contribution in art, Yoo received the Prime Minister's Commendation at the 7th Korean Popular Culture & Arts Awards in October 2016. In 2017, Yoo starred in fantasy-romance drama Chicago Typewriter. He played double roles of a now famous novelist and the leader of a resistance group during the 1930s Japanese occupation of Korea.

=== 2018–present: International acclaim and activism ===
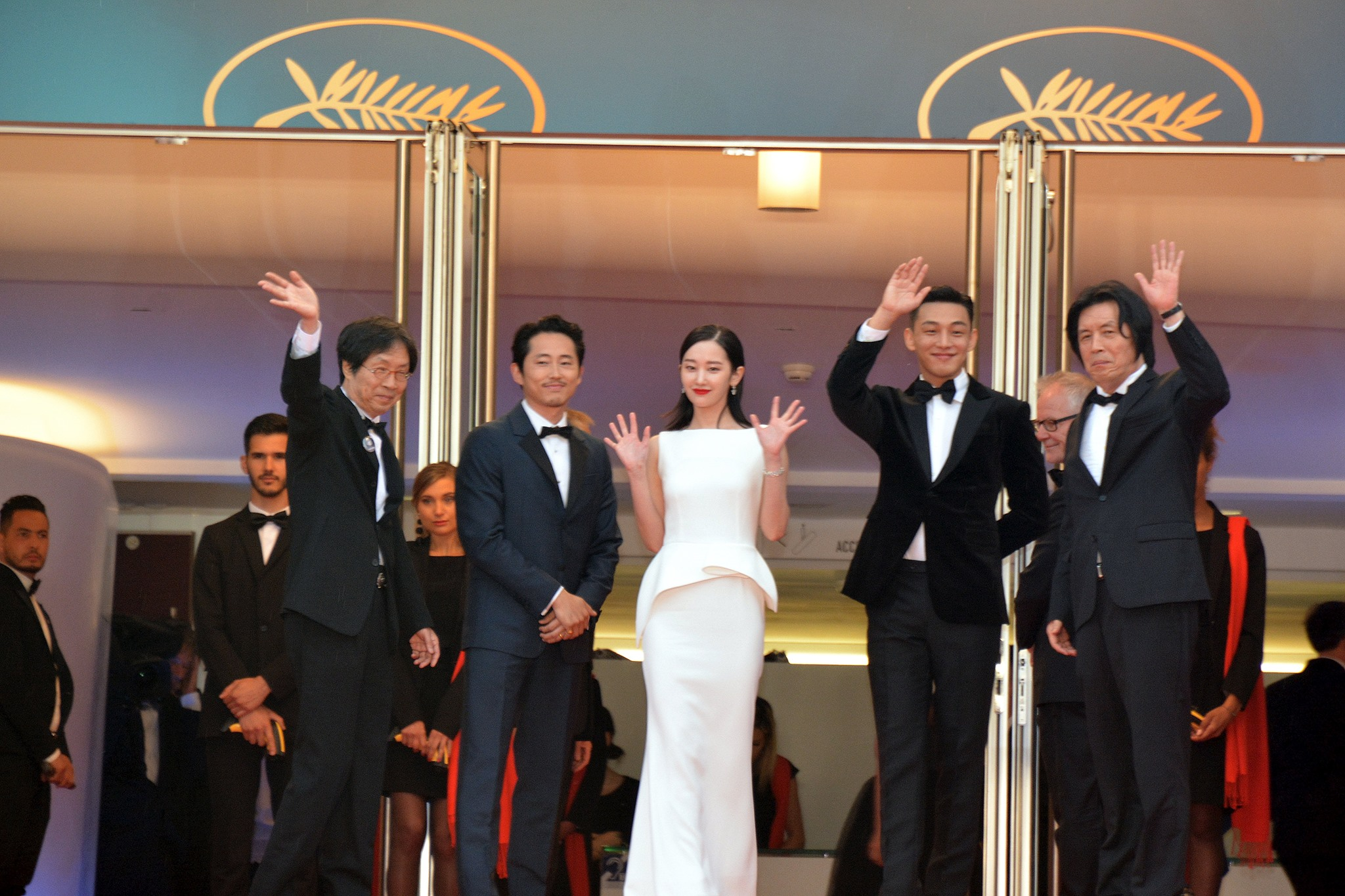
Yoo (second on the right) at the premiere of Burning at the Cannes Film Festival in May 2018

In 2018, Yoo starred in Lee Chang-dong's film Burning opposite Steven Yeun, portraying a pure and sensitive young man, Jong-su, who tries to solve the mystery surrounding the woman he loves. Lee said the reason he cast Yoo, "Yoo Ah-in is one of the most famous Korean actors in that age group, and he's known for being good at delivering emotionally charged performances. In contrast to that, Jong-su is such a passive and shy character who doesn't show his emotions and who doesn't react, so I thought that would be really interesting for this actor to play this role." Lee then praised, "No one else could inhabit the character of Jong-su like he did. Yoo Ah-in is irreplaceable for this role, he is capable of conveying great nuance and sensitivity."

Burning had its premiere at the Cannes Film Festival, where Yoo walked the red carpet. It was selected as the South Korean entry for the Best Foreign Language Film at the 91st Academy Awards, became the first Korean film to make it to the final nine-film shortlist of the Academy Award for Best Foreign Language Film.

Yoo's performance was praised. Justin Chang of Los Angeles Times said on NPR, "As the movie's inarticulate male lead, Yoo Ah-in has, in some ways, the trickiest task. But he reaches almost subterranean depths of feeling." Jessica Kiang of The Playlist wrote, "Yoo's Jong-su is the very definition of still waters that run deep and dark and conceal who knows what in their murky reaches. Only a flawlessly assured performance could make the film's devastating yet ambivalent and enigmatic finale work as well as it does here." Pierce Conran of Screen Anarchy wrote, "Even more impressive is Yoo Ah-in, who is most well known in the West for playing the slimy son of a corporate head who serves as the villain in Ryoo Seung-wan's Veteran. Never better, Yoo embodies a sense of confusion, which eventually turns to dread in a performance that doesn't allow us to make any easy judgments about his character. Jong-soo's intentions throughout the story may seem innocent, but coupled with references to emasculation and his timid physicality, Yoo crafts an unusually compelling lead." Tim Grierson of Screen Daily wrote, "Ah-in Yoo is remarkable as Burning's ineffectual, withdrawn protagonist: he's the perfect vessel for Lee's grand treatise on the immutable fact that none of us truly understands anyone or anything." For his role in Burning, The New York Times featured Yoo in their list of "The Best Actors of 2018", making him the only Asian to be on the list and the first Korean actor to do so.

In November 2018, Yoo starred in the crisis film Default, taking over the role of Yoon Jeong-hak, who bet on the crisis after leaving the securities company and forecasting national bankruptcy. This character gave the impression that "is different from the youth that Yoo Ah-in has represented before", as in, "a person who represents the desire of ordinary people" and "a person who embraces the crossroads of the older and younger generations three-dimensionally." Yoo said he wanted to be "a medium to understand two generations at the same times", and he starred in the film with the thoughts of "how to accept the established system" and "what era we're living in right now." He also said the reasons he participated in this movie were because the movie dealt with the story in "a polite approach", and it was interesting that a female character deals with the country's major crisis and tries to solve it. In response, co-star Kim Hye-soo described Yoo as "an actor who has healthy mind", and thanked him for his decision to appear in the movie, saying that understanding message of the film and starring in this film is a possible choice because he is Yoo Ah-in.

Yoo was featured in Forbes as a star to take note of in January 2019. He next became the host, co-writer and co-producer for 12 episodes of KBS1 special talk show Do-ol Ah-in Going All Directions with philosopher Do-ol Kim Yong-ok, broadcast from January 5 to March 23, 2019. His first take on hosting a talk show garnered positive press reviews, noting, "he is the only actor who ever tried creating such a platform of communication", "honestly expressing his beliefs on various topics including gender discrimination", "[h]e met the audience directly with refreshing candor", and "Yoo Ah-in's and Do-ol's open communication method helped narrowing the generation gap." On April 3, 2019, Yoo and Do-ol were invited to participate in the 71st anniversary of Jeju uprising on Jeju Island, reading the declaration of peace and "The 71st Jeju Resolutions" in front of more than ten thousand spectators. Yoo said in his speech, "I shamefully did not know much about Jeju 4.3. I did not know what to call it, nor why we were not supposed to know about it [...] After learning about Jeju 4.3, I realized that it's a moment in history we all should never forget, and that we must continue to talk about and to make the issue current." And, "I could not imagine how the perpetrators could continue to go on with their lives after what they did. I would never have imagined how the victims and the bereaved families endure the years of grief, and how Jeju island bears these unbelievable wounds in its history."

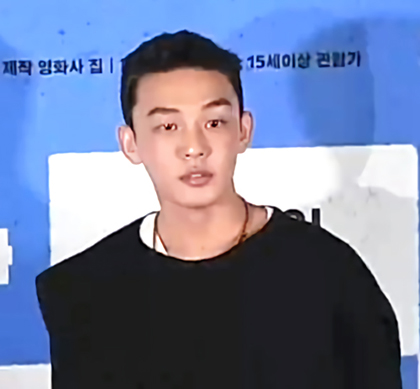
Yoo at the press conference for #Alive in 2020

In 2020, Yoo starred in a zombie thriller #Alive as survivor Jun-woo, based on the original script of Hollywood screenwriter Matt Naylor. The film premiered on June 24, 2020, and became the first film to surpass 1 million admissions since February 2020 prior to the outbreak of COVID-19 in South Korea. In September 2020, #Alive became the first Korean film to top Netflix Movies Worldwide chart. By the end of 2020, it became one of the most popular titles globally on Netflix.

In October 2020, Yoo starred in low-budget indie film Voice of Silence as a mutism character without a single line throughout the film, directed and written by a new female director Hong Eui-jeong, based on her script which was selected as one of the top 12 projects at Venice Biennale College-Cinema 2016/2017. Director Hong Eui-jeong said about the casting, "It was not easy to carry on a hardly commercial, small film, but I sent the script to Yoo Ah-in's agent and I was shocked that he responded sooner than I expected." For his role as a mute clean-up worker Tae-in, Yoo gained over 33 pounds (15 kg) and shaved his head. Hong Eui-jeong said that the original character in the script was supposed to be a slender young man, but in their first meeting, Yoo already gained weight because he thought it would suit with the character who worked a lot of physical labor. She recalled she was visually overwhelmed by his appearance, saying, "I didn't recognize him at first." After some discussions, she agreed that his physical transformation would work well with the silent Tae-in who used the body language to communicate. Later, she sent Yoo a video clip of gorrillas for his character study. She said, "I gave him a gorilla video because I set out Tae-in behavioral much more than I did emotional descriptions." Hong said the reason he cast Yoo, "Yoo Ah-in clearly had this boyish image that Tae-in needed. [...] He is not only excellent in acting, but he also has an image that creates time and space around the narrative. Thanks to him, Voice of Silence could have a more daydream-like fantasy atmosphere, and though I had worries about having a character without lines, his distinctive texture filled up the movie, leaving no void, despite the absence of lines". She praised him on his contribution to the character, saying, "Yoo Ah-in's interpretation of Tae-in's character was new and vivid beyond the script's suggestion. [...] [t]hrough his ideas and suggestions, I had the experience of discovering and learning about aspects of Tae-in, a character whom I created in the screenplay, that were till then unknown to me. [...] Ultimately, Tae-in was born with a look that was different from the feel in the scriptwriting stage".

Yoo's performance was critically acclaimed. Jennie Kermode from Eye of Film wrote, "With a greater focus on character than plot, the film benefits from solid acting all round [...] It's Yoo, however, who is the standout, taking his character through a remarkable arc." Nikki Baughan of Screen International wrote in his Fantasia International Film Festival review, "Working without dialogue, Yoo Ah-in resists the easy temptation of extreme physical expression; instead, he deploys restraint in his movements, conveying Tae-in's soul-destroying lack of options in his hangdog expression, his downcast eyes, his frantic attempts to cover up bloodstains in the dust." Nick Allen of Roger Ebert was similarly positive, saying, "Yoo Ah-in of #Alive giving a compelling, full-bodied performance." Jack Cameron wrote for The Film Magazine, "Yoo Ah-in, who was so excellent in Burning, is just as strong here, communicating everything with his highly expressive body language and his deliberately passive facial expressions. His breathing and grunting noises often hold your attention more strongly than some of the written dialogue".

For his roles in both #Alive and Voice of Silence, Yoo was named "Actor of the Year" at the 2020 Cine 21 Awards. For his performance in Voice of Silence, he won Best Leading Actor and Popular Star awards at the 41st Blue Dragon Film Awards, and became the second actor to win best actor award twice before the age of 40, following Sul Kyung-gu. He also won Best Actor in the Film Category at the 57th Baeksang Arts Awards, Cheval Noir Award for Best Actor at the 25th Fantasia International Film Festival, and Best Actor awards at the 30th Buil Film Awards and 15th Asian Film Awards respectively in 2021 for his performance in Voice of Silence.

Yoo's next role was that of the cult leader Jung Jin-soo in Yeon Sang-ho's Netflix series Hellbound that was released in November 2021. The series had its world premiere at the 2021 Toronto International Film Festival in the Primetime program of TV series in September 2021, and became the first Korean drama to make it to the festival. It was also screened at 26th Busan International Film Festival in newly created On Screen section, and at the 65th BFI London Film Festival in Thrill section in October 2021. Hellbound became the first Korean series to top Netflix TV Shows Worldwide chart within a day after its release, and topped Netflix's official weekly chart for non-English TV programs. Yoo gained recognition from critics and viewers for his performance, despite him being antagonist. Nick Allen wrote for Roger Ebert, "Yoo Ah-in is excellent in this role that has him delivering cryptic words of faith with a certain deadness in his eyes." Andrew Murray from The Upcoming wrote, "[...] it's Ah-in who steals the spotlight as soft-spoken cult leader Jeong Jin-Soo. Skilfully walking the line between menacing and charming, this charismatic figure has everything needed to become a memorable antagonist." Brian Tallerico of The Playlist was similarly positive and wrote, "Yoo Ah-in, also in the Netflix hit #Alive, is such a fascinating young actor, one who really gets what Hellbound should be about, that the show suffers when he leaves it". Polygon's Zosha Millman wrote, "Yoo Ah-in is particularly inspired casting, letting his chairman be just as virtuous as he is shifty, immovable in his low-key fanaticism. It's on his shoulders that the rest of the players can build their respective roles without ever feeling simply drawn". Hidzir Junaini from NME wrote, "His quiet demeanor belying an unsettling intensity, Yoo Ah-in's performance as the show's pivotal villain is creepily fascinating".

In 2022, Yoo portrayed the "Sanggye-dong Supreme Team" leader in a Netflix crime comedy film Seoul Vibe with Kim Sung-kyun, Jung Woong-in and Moon So-ri among the cast. Despite the film's mixed reviews, Yoo's performance received critical acclaim. Divya Malladi from Digital Mafia Talkies wrote, "Yoo Ah In as Dong Wook brought such a degree of believability to his character, with his blind courage that was balanced by a shrewd calculative nature." Pramit Chatterjee wrote for High On Films, "Yoo Ah-in is undoubtedly the star here, and he delivers a major chunk of the fireworks."

Yoo next will star opposite Lee Byung-hun, portraying South Korean professional Go player Lee Chang-ho in The Match. The film is scheduled to be released on Netflix in 2023. He will also play unemployed man with superpowers in Kang Hyeong-cheol's fantasy film Hi-Five, alongside Ra Mi-ran, and star in Netflix apocalyptic drama Goodbye Earth, a work based on the novel The Fool of the End by Kōtarō Isaka, directed by Kim Jin-min.

== Other works ==
=== Studio Concrete ===
Yoo is the representative, curator, and creative director of Studio Concrete; a creative collective which was established in 2014 by a group of artists born in the 1980s. Yoo and his friends founded Studio Concrete with the mission of "building a healthy support system for the future generations of creatives." The group is involved in a range of creative projects including planning exhibitions and advertisements, graphic design, product design and art collaborations. Located in a remodeled old townhouse in Hannam-dong, the group's atelier functions as a cultural complex and features a gallery, cafe and shop. The space hosts free monthly exhibitions and events that introduce the work of emerging local and international artists.

Through Studio Concrete exhibitions, Yoo shows his support for the LGBT community, liberal feminist, Korean Childhood Leukemia Foundation, and other minority groups. In addition to Studio Concrete's annual charity bazaar for children, the art gallery holds new events every month for various groups. In 2017, Studio Concrete collaborated with Diesel for "Make Love Not Walls" Global Campaign in Seoul. The gallery also held a Feminist Book Fair & Discussion. In 2018, Studio Concrete produced a short documentary The Interview for Diesel's "Hate Couture" Global Campaign to take a stand against Cyberbullying. All the proceeds from the brand's sale were donated to the anti-bullying programmes. That same year, the gallery collaborated with W Korea magazine for "Breast Cancer Awareness" Campaign. Proceeds from the item's sale were donated to Korean breast cancer foundation. The following year, Studio Concrete co-produced 12 episodes of KBS1 special talk show Do-ol Ah-in Going All Directions commemorating 100th Year March First Movement.

International artists who have held their solo exhibitions in Studio Concrete are Daniel Caesar, Jean Jullien, Joan Cornellà, and Eric Joyner. Since 2016, Studio Concrete has been working together with DJ Peggy Gou, as well. Until 2019, Studio Concrete has held 16 solo exhibitions, 18 collaborative exhibitions, 2 special invitation exhibitions, and art collaboration projects with The National Museum of Modern and Contemporary Art, Diesel, Budweiser, Absolut Vodka, Dunkin' Donuts, CNCity Energy, and more.

=== Philanthropy ===
In 2013, Yoo donated to a campaign titled "I Am Against The Unfair Food Tray of Children" through The Beautiful Foundation. He had helped The Beautiful Foundation adding 22% to the fundraising goal, thus only 1% to go to reach 350 million Won. The Foundation published his letter encouraging participation, and soon after, the fundraising exceeded its goal.

In 2014, Yoo launched a local clothing line named Newkids Nohant to create Hangul-themed T-shirt designs. He then donated the profits worth 100 million won made through the clothing line, opening up the Newkids Yoo Ah In Charity Fund in 2015. The fund will be used to provide aid for college tuition and educational expenses for the students who attend college while living in or after retiring from residential care centers. On April 18, 2014, Yoo quietly joined the Sewol Ferry relief efforts after the Sinking of MV Sewol tragedy, and secretly sent supplies to the family members of missing passengers in Jindo.

Since 2015 Yoo and his art gallery Studio Concrete hold the annual charity bazaar to celebrate Children's Day and donate all the proceeds from the bazaar to the Korea Childhood Leukemia Foundation. In 2016, he donated museum tickets worth 40 million Won for underprivileged children.

Yoo is the first Asian actor to be the global model of Diesel. In September 2018, Yoo joined Diesel's "Hate Couture" Global Campaign to take a stand against Cyberbullying. Yoo and his artist group Studio Concrete released a short documentary The Interview for the campaign on September 20, 2018. The Interview took the form of a fake documentary rarely seen in the fashion film genre. Yoo took the helm as the creative director and the main character himself. Proceeds from the sale of the brand's pieces will be donated in support of anti-bullying programmes.

Yoo has been a supporter of breast cancer awareness campaigns since 2012 through Amore Pacific Group and W Korea Magazine's annual campaign activities, such as "Pink Ribbon Love Marathon" and "Love Your W" campaigns. In January 2017, together with the renown sculptor Osang Gwon, Yoo teamed up to produce a bust-sized cubist sculpture, symbolizing the breast cancer awareness campaign "Love Your W". On October 26, 2018, Yoo and his artist group Studio Concrete collaborated with W Korea in the 13th annual "Love Your W" campaign by designing a set of special T-shirts, and bringing up the Woman & Beauty theme for a photo exhibition called "Love Your W". Proceeds from the exhibition were donated to the Korean Breast Cancer Foundation.

== Public image ==
Considered one of the most outspoken and politically socially charged Korean actors of his generation, Yoo drew media attention in late 2012 when he tweeted a strongly worded criticism against the withdrawal of Ahn Cheol-soo from the presidential race. He also criticized the age regulation on Lady Gaga's concert in Seoul which were first sold as PG-13 but later on changed to PG-18. On November 19, 2016, Yoo took part in the biggest mass rally calling for president Park Geun-hye's resignation.

Yoo identifies himself as a feminist. In February 2016, Yoo's remarks about female film directors while promoting his movie Like for Likes grabbed media attention. Yoo said, "I want to work with a female movie director. When people talk about female directors, they always put 'female' in front of director, even though they don't put 'male' for male directors. This can mean that women are special, but in reality women often lose out in society because of their gender. I want to lend weight to them and I am also curious about working with them." Yoo also made a feminist remark about the film, "This film depicts the stereotypical perception of women that is deeply rooted in Korean society. When a man articulates his opinion, he is considered as having self-confidence and cool, but when a woman does the same she is called a very opinionated. This part went straight to my heart." In February 2017, Yoo stated, "I am also a feminist, since all of us wish for equality. So, whoever wishes for a world where he or she is not marginalized, persecuted, nor hurt because of his or her own attributes—is in fact a feminist by choice."

In late 2017, Yoo tweeted a strongly worded criticism against the radical feminist community Megalia, which resulted in accusations that he had made aggressive expressions of a typical patriarchally minded Korean man. Yoo denied the allegation. In March 2018, he posted a short, silent, caption-less clip of some people being tied down and burned to death while the people surrounding them just watching. Netizens quickly assumed that the video pointed towards the Me Too movement in South Korea as a witch-hunt. In the BBC interview, May 2018, Yoo said, "Feminism is the most important human rights movement of today." And, "There is the structure of 'men, the discriminator of women' versus 'women, the victim.' We must co-exist in this world, and I believe that the way to do so must be discussed in a less aggressive, more peaceful way." In his talkshow Do-ol Ah-in Going All Directions, January 2019, Yoo's thought on gender war happening in South Korea and his support for the minorities have drawn media attention, "The rational voice of the weak and the minority have never been accepted much by those with power or vested interests. Considering what causes such aggressive and even violent voices to emerge, I think it's because our society does not yet accept reasonable, honest, and sincere demands. However, if we take a step away from the irrational violent voices, I think we have an opportunity to change society."

Yoo has appeared in advertising campaigns for international brands, such as McCafé, Diadora, Diesel, Cartier, Absolut Vodka, Calvin Klein, Burberry, Birkenstock, Burger King, and Puma. He is the first Asian actor to be a global model of Diesel, and the first Korean actor to be a Korean brand ambassador for Cartier. Yoo is also the first Korean and only Asian celebrity to be chosen as a global ambassador for Calvin Klein's 2019 "I Speak My Truth" campaign, and was chosen by Riccardo Tisci to be Burberry's only male global ambassador since 2019. In 2020, he joined the Birkenstock Global Personality campaign along with Grace Coddington. The following year, he contributed to Balenciaga and World Food Programme's 2021 "Zero Hunger" campaign by donating all his modeling fees from the Balenciaga's WFP 2021 Spring Collection to the campaign. In November 2022, Yoo was chosen by GQ Korea as one of the Men of the Year.

== Personal life ==
Yoo has two elder sisters. In addition to managing Studio Concrete art gallery in Hannam-dong, Yoo had been an investor and business partner of TMI (Too Much Information), a Korean healthy fried food with mushroom-oriented restaurant in Itaewon, Seoul from 2015 to 2017.

Yoo was also a freelance writer. He had been the chief editor of Tom Greyhound's fashion magazine Tom Paper from 2014 to 2016, and had contributed several columns for magazines such as InStyle Korea, and Movieweek. The Seoul Poets Association's magazine, Monthly Poetry, praised his writings as "beautiful, clear and clean breath of oneself that is different from glamorous life of an actor." His writings were noticed by publishers and professional writers as well.

In his spare time, Yoo likes cooking for his acquaintances.

=== Military service exemption ===
In 2017, Yoo revealed that he had a bone tumor, and thus had been delaying his mandatory military service. Yoo's representatives stated that his symptoms were benign, which meant that the non-cancerous tumor would have minimal effect on his everyday life and carry no risk of spreading. On June 27, 2017, Yoo's representatives announced that he had been exempt from military service after failing five medical examinations.

=== Legal issues ===
==== Drug-related investigations and results ====
On February 8, 2023, Yoo was questioned by the police for propofol use, and would share more details and promise to cooperate with all investigations, confirmed by his agency UAA. The police performed a search and seizure of various doctors' offices and clinics in Seoul's Gangnam and Yongsan districts that are suspected of having illegally administered propofol to Yoo since early 2021. Later, the police banned Yoo from leaving the country. On February 10, the police officially announced that a sample of Yoo's urine had tested positive for marijuana and negative for propofol. The results of his hair test would then be revealed on February 23. As the police's claims gathered public attention, advertisers quickly pulled their advertisements featuring Yoo, which according to Korea's Daily, included popular international brands such as a pharmaceutical company and a Chinese fashion brand. Yoo's drug scandal also impacted his upcoming projects, including the Netflix film The Match, which was supposed to be released in the first half of 2023 but temporarily put on hold, Hi-Five, in post-production, and the Netflix series Goodbye Earth, released on April 26, 2024. On February 23, the police announced that Yoo tested positive for propofol as the result of a detailed hair analysis. He had also tested positive for marijuana in a previous drug test.

On March 1, 2023, it was announced that his hair test also revealed the presence of parts of cocaine and ketamine.

On September 3, 2024, Yoo was sentenced to one year in prison for habitually abusing illegal drugs and immediately put under detention with a fine of ₩2 million.

Following the scandal, Yoo was dropped from Hellbound's second season, and replaced by actor Kim Sung-cheol.

On February 18, 2025, Yoo was released after being sentenced to a one-year prison sentence in prison due to receiving a suspended sentence from an appellate court.

==== Sexual assault-related investigations and results ====
On July 26, 2024, a 30-year-old man filed a criminal complaint to the officials at Yongsan Police Station that Yoo allegedly raped him while he was asleep in a unit of an officetel in Yongsan District, Seoul, on July 14. It was reported that the property did not belong to either of them and that other men were present at the scene. Yoo's lawyer denied the allegations and stated that the claims were unfounded.

On September 19, 2024, Yoo was cleared of sexual assault charges due to lack of evidence.

=== Unregistered agency ===
Yoo's one-person firm, U Company LLC (유컴퍼니 유한회사), was reported at the end of 2025 to have operated for years after its 2016 incorporation without popular-culture planning-business registration. Outlets placed him in a wider run of unregistered-agency reports involving other entertainers and said the December filing looked like a late response to that controversy. Under the Popular Culture and Arts Industry Development Act, operating without that registration can carry up to two years' imprisonment or a ₩20 million fine. The government registry showed the company completed registration on 22 December 2025. It is based in Daegu; Yoo is listed under his legal name, Uhm Hong-sik, and management and publicity are among its stated purposes. A representative of UAA, the talent agency with which he was also affiliated, said the matter was not a professional problem.

== Accolades ==
=== Awards and nominations ===
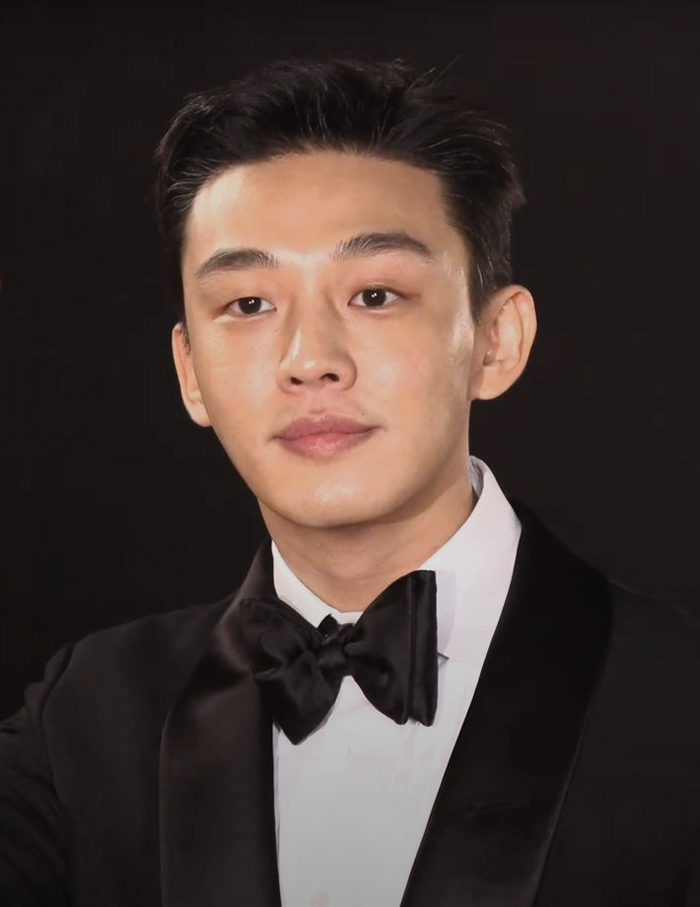
Yoo at the 39th Blue Dragon Film Awards in 2018

Year presented, name of the award ceremony, award category, nominated work and the result of the nomination
Year	Award	Category	Nominated work	Result	Ref.
2004	Gonews Netizen Entertainment Awards	Best New Actor in Drama Series	Sharp	Nominated	
2007	3rd Pierson Youth Film Festival	Best Newcomer, Month of May	Boys of Tomorrow	Won	
2007	3rd Pierson Youth Film Festival	Best New Actor	Boys of Tomorrow	Won	
2007	8th Busan Film Critics Awards	Best New Actor	Boys of Tomorrow	Won	
2007	28th Blue Dragon Film Awards	Best New Actor	Skeletons in the Closet	Nominated	
2008	11th Director's Cut Awards	Best New Actor	Antique	Won	
2010	5th A-Awards (Arena Homme + and Audi Korea)	Style Award	—N/a	Won	
2010	KBS Drama Awards	Best New Actor	Sungkyunkwan Scandal	Nominated	
2010	KBS Drama Awards	Best Couple Award with Song Joong-ki	Sungkyunkwan Scandal	Won	
2011	5th Mnet 20's Choice Awards	Hot 20's Voice	—N/a	Won	
2011	5th Mnet 20's Choice Awards	Hot Style Icon	—N/a	Nominated	
2011	4th Style Icon Awards	Bonsang ("Main Award")	—N/a	Won	
2012	3rd KOFRA Film Awards	Discovery Award	Punch	Won	
2012	6th Mnet 20's Choice Awards	20's Movie Actor	Punch	Nominated	
2012	6th Mnet 20's Choice Awards	20's Style	—N/a	Nominated	
2012	21st Buil Film Awards	Best Actor	Punch	Nominated	
2012	SBS Drama Awards	Excellence Award, Actor in a Miniseries	Fashion King	Nominated	
2012	SBS Drama Awards	Best Couple Award with Shin Se-kyung	Fashion King	Nominated	
2013	9th Korean Environmental & Community Awards	People Who Made the World Brighter (Broadcasting/Entertainment category)	—N/a	Won	
2013	SBS Drama Awards	Excellence Award, Actor in a Mid-length Drama	Jang Ok-jung, Living by Love	Nominated	
2013	SBS Drama Awards	Best Couple Award with Kim Tae-hee	Jang Ok-jung, Living by Love	Nominated	
2014	50th Baeksang Arts Awards	Best Actor (TV)	Secret Love Affair	Nominated	
2014	7th Korea Drama Awards	Top Excellence Award, Actor	Secret Love Affair	Nominated	
2014	3rd APAN Star Awards	Top Excellence Award, Actor in a Miniseries	Secret Love Affair	Nominated	
2015	10th Soompi Awards	Best Couple Awards with Kim Hee-ae	Secret Love Affair	Nominated	
2015	3rd Marie Claire Asia Star Awards	Asia Star of the Year	Veteran	Won	
2015	15th Korea World Youth Film Festival	Favorite Actor	Veteran	Won	
2015	35th Korean Association of Film Critics Awards	Best Actor	Veteran	Nominated	
2015	35th Korean Association of Film Critics Awards	Best Actor	The Throne	Nominated	
2015	52nd Grand Bell Awards	Best Actor	Veteran	Nominated	
2015	52nd Grand Bell Awards	Best Actor	The Throne	Nominated	
2015	36th Blue Dragon Film Awards	Best Leading Actor	The Throne	Won	
2015	1st Fashionista Awards	Best Male Fashionista in a Movie (First Prize)	Veteran	Won	
2015	10th A-Awards (Arena Homme + and Mont Blanc Korea)	Style Award	—N/a	Won	
2015	5th SACF Artists of the Year Awards	Artistic Impression in Motion Pictures Award	Veteran, The Throne	Won	
2015	Cine21 Film Awards	Best Actor	Veteran, The Throne	Won	
2015	4th CFDK Awards	Fashion Icon Award	—N/a	Won	
2015	The Korea Film Actors Association Awards	Top Star Award	Veteran, The Throne	Won	
2015	SBS Drama Awards	Grand Prize (Daesang)	Six Flying Dragons	Nominated	
2015	SBS Drama Awards	Top Excellence Award, Actor in a Serial Drama	Six Flying Dragons	Won	
2015	SBS Drama Awards	Producer's Award	Six Flying Dragons	Nominated	
2015	SBS Drama Awards	Best Couple Award with Shin Se-kyung	Six Flying Dragons	Won	
2015	SBS Drama Awards	Top 10 Stars	Six Flying Dragons	Won	
2016	7th KOFRA Film Awards	Best Actor	The Throne	Won	
2016	11th Soompi Awards	Actor of the Year	Six Flying Dragons	Nominated	
2016	11th Max Movie Awards	Best Actor	Veteran	Won	
2016	8th Style Icon Awards	Bonsang ("Main Award")	—N/a	Won	
2016	18th Asian Film Critics Association Awards	Best Actor	The Throne	Nominated	
2016	10th Asian Film Awards	Next Generation Award	Veteran, The Throne	Won	
2016	21st Chunsa Film Art Awards	Best Actor	The Throne	Won	
2016	36th Golden Cinematography Awards	Best Actor	Veteran	Won	
2016	52nd Baeksang Arts Awards	Grand Prize (Daesang) for Film	Veteran, The Throne	Nominated	
2016	52nd Baeksang Arts Awards	Best Actor (Film)	The Throne	Nominated	
2016	52nd Baeksang Arts Awards	Best Actor (TV)	Six Flying Dragons	Won	
2016	11th Seoul International Drama Awards	Best Actor	Six Flying Dragons	Nominated	
2016	1st Asia Artist Awards	Grand Prize (Daesang) for TV Actor of the Year	Six Flying Dragons	Nominated	
2016	16th Korea World Youth Film Festival	Favorite Actor	Like for Likes	Won	
2017	5th DramaFever Awards	Best Actor	Six Flying Dragons	Nominated	
2017	19th Korea Fashion Photographers Association Awards	Photogenic of the Year	—N/a	Won	
2018	13th Soompi Awards	Actor of the Year	Chicago Typewriter	Nominated	
2018	27th Buil Film Awards	Best Actor	Burning	Nominated	
2018	55th Grand Bell Awards	Best Actor	Burning	Nominated	
2018	2nd The Seoul Awards	Best Actor (Film)	Burning	Nominated	
2018	39th Blue Dragon Film Awards	Best Leading Actor	Burning	Nominated	
2019	16th International Cinephile Society Awards	Best Actor	Burning	Nominated	
2019	21st Asian Film Critics Association Awards	Best Actor	Burning	Nominated	
2019	13th Asian Film Awards	Best Actor	Burning	Nominated	
2019	55th Baeksang Arts Awards	Best Actor (Film)	Burning	Nominated	
2019	24th Chunsa Film Art Awards	Best Actor	Burning	Nominated	
2020	Cine 21 Awards	Best Actor	#Alive, Voice of Silence	Won	
2021	41st Blue Dragon Film Awards	Best Leading Actor	Voice of Silence	Won	
2021	41st Blue Dragon Film Awards	Popular Star Award	Voice of Silence	Won	
2021	57th Baeksang Arts Awards	Best Actor (Film)	Voice of Silence	Won	
2021	25th Fantasia International Film Festival	Cheval Noir Award for Best Actor	Voice of Silence	Won	
2021	30th Buil Film Awards	Best Actor	Voice of Silence	Won	
2021	15th Asian Film Awards	Best Actor	Voice of Silence	Won	
2021	26th Chunsa Film Art Awards	Best Actor	Voice of Silence	Nominated	
2021	6th Asia Artist Awards	Grand Prize (Daesang) for Film Actor of the Year	Voice of Silence	Won	
2021	6th Asia Artist Awards	Asian Celebrity Award (Actor)	Voice of Silence	Won	
2022	20th Director's Cut Awards	Best Actor (Film)	Voice of Silence	Nominated	
2022	20th Director's Cut Awards	Best Actor (TV)	Hellbound	Nominated	
2022	8th APAN Star Awards	Top Excellence Award, Actor in an OTT Drama	Hellbound	Nominated	
2022	8th APAN Star Awards	Popularity Star Award, Actor	Hellbound	Nominated	
2025	23rd Director's Cut Awards	Best Actor (Film)	The Match	Nominated	

=== State honors ===
Name of country, year given, and name of honor
Country/Organization	Year	Honor/Award	Ref.
South Korea (Note: Honors are given at the Korean Popular Culture and Arts Awards, arranged by the Korea Creative Content Agency and hosted by the Ministry of Culture, Sports and Tourism. They are awarded to those who have contributed to the arts and South Korea's pop culture.)	2016	Prime Minister Award	

=== Critics Poll ===
Year	Award	Category	Nominated work	Result	Ref.
2018	Esquire Magazine	13 Great Movie Performances from 2018	Burning	8th place	
2018	The New York Times	The Best Actor of 2018	Burning	9th place	
2018	The Playlist	The Best Performances of 2018	Burning	8th place	
2019	Taste of Cinema	The 10 Best Subtle Movie Performances of The Decade	Burning	8th place	
2020	Marie Claire Korea	The 9 Strangest Movie Performances of 2020	Voice of Silence	2nd place	
2021	YTN	The Best Actor of 2021	Hellbound	2nd place	

=== Listicles ===
Name of publisher, year listed, name of listicle, and placement
Publisher	Year	Listicle	Placement	Ref.
Forbes	2016	Korea Power Celebrity	2nd	
GQ Korea	2022	Men of the Year	—N/a	
JoongAng Ilbo	2017	Fashion Powers	2nd	
Maekyung Economy	2015	Top 10 Hit Products of the Year	7th	
Maxmovie Magazine	2016	CGV Hall of Fame – Film Legends 20 (2010's)	—N/a	
Sisa Journal	2015	100 Next Generation Leaders	29th overall	
Sisa Journal	2015	100 Next Generation Leaders	9th – Pop culture	
Sisa Journal	2015	Person of the Year – Entertainment	—N/a	
