= 41st Blue Dragon Film Awards =

2020 edition of award ceremony

- Official poster
- Date: February 9, 2021
- Site: Paradise City, Incheon
- Hosted by: Kim Hye-soo; Yoo Yeon-seok
- Organized by: Sports Chosun (a sister brand of The Chosun Ilbo)

Highlights
- Best Film: The Man Standing Next
- Best Director: Lim Dae-hyung; Moonlit Winter
- Best Actor: Yoo Ah-in; Voice of Silence
- Best Actress: Ra Mi-ran; Honest Candidate
- Most awards: Samjin Company English Class (3)
- Most nominations: The Man Standing Next (11)

Television coverage
- Network: SBS; V Live

The 41st Blue Dragon Film Awards (Korean: 제41회 청룡영화상) ceremony was held on February 9, 2021, at Paradise City, Incheon. Organized by Sports Chosun (a sister brand of The Chosun Ilbo). It was aired live on SBS.

== COVID-19 pandemic ==
Due to the ongoing COVID-19 pandemic, this year's ceremony will have several safety measures in place. Set to take place in Paradise City in Incheon, the ceremony will be "ontact", meaning that there will be no live audience in the arena. However, a multiscreen will be set up near the stage so that fans can cheer on their stars through a video screen.

There will be a limit on the number of people allowed in the building to comply with social distancing guidelines. There will also be temperature checks, installation of hand sanitizer dispensers, and sterilization of the event arena. For the actors attending the ceremony, the usual audience seats will be replaced with small tables, with a small number of people seated at each table. There will also be clear plastic guards to separate the celebrities.

The event organizer announced the postponement on December 8, saying that due to the rapid re-proliferation of COVID-19, the 41st Blue Dragon Film Awards, scheduled to be held on December 11, will be postponed till early 2021.

== Nominees & winners ==
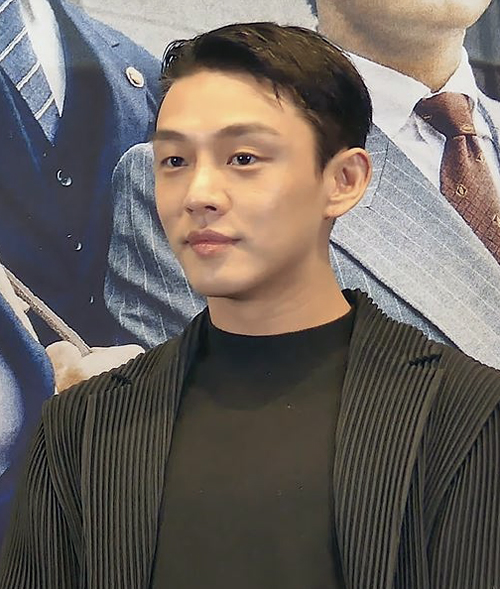
Yoo Ah-in, Best Actor winner

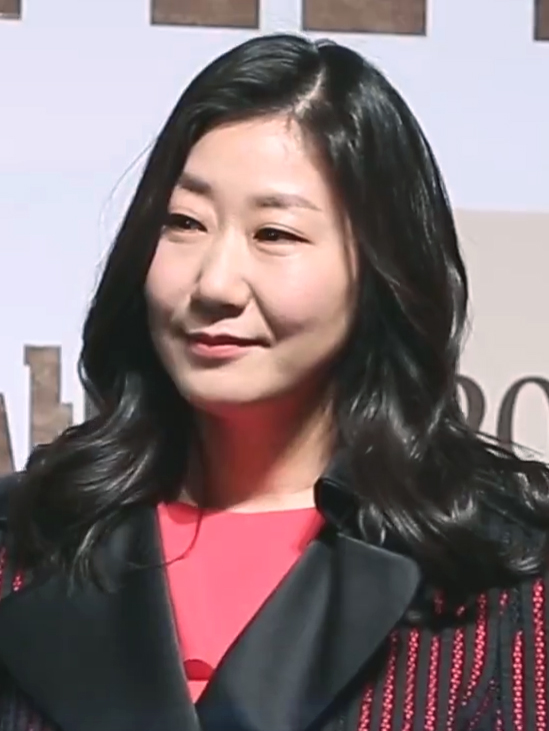
Ra Mi-ran, Best Actress winner

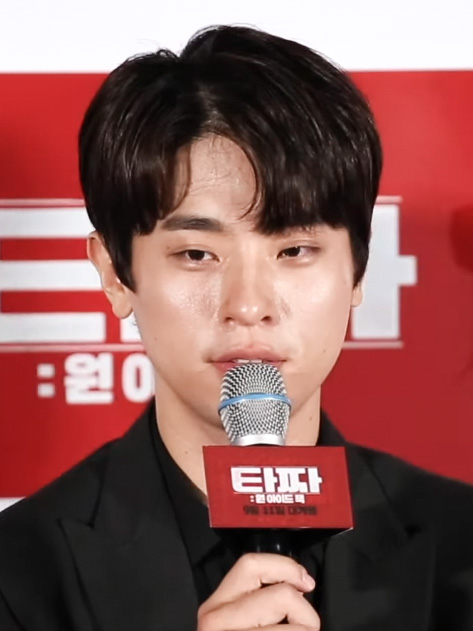
Park Jeong-min, Best Supporting Actor winner

The nominees for the 41st Blue Dragon Film Awards were announced on November 11, 2020.

Winners are listed first, highlighted in boldface, and indicated with a double dagger (‡).

- (Winners denoted in **bold**)

**Best Film**	**Best Director**
**The Man Standing Next** ‡; Moving On; Voice of Silence; Moonlit Winter; Kim Ji-young: Born 1982	**Lim Dae-hyung – Moonlit Winter ‡**; Yang Woo-suk – Steel Rain 2: Summit; Yeon Sang-ho – Peninsula; Woo Min-ho – The Man Standing Next; Hong Won-chan – Deliver Us from Evil
**Best Leading Actor**	**Best Leading Actress**
**Yoo Ah-in – Voice of Silence as Tae-in ‡**; Lee Byung-hun – The Man Standing Next as Kim Gyu-pyeong; Lee Jung-jae – Deliver Us from Evil as Ray; Jung Woo-sung – Steel Rain 2: Summit as Han Kyeong-jae; Hwang Jung-min – Deliver Us from Evil as Kim In-nam	**Ra Mi-ran – Honest Candidate as Joo Sang-sook ‡**; Kim Hee-ae – Moonlit Winter as Yoon-hee; Shin Min-a – Diva as Choi Yi-young; Jeon Do-yeon – Beasts Clawing at Straws as Choi Yeon-hee; Jung Yu-mi – Kim Ji-young: Born 1982 as Kim Ji-young
**Best Supporting Actor**	**Best Supporting Actress**
**Park Jeong-min – Deliver Us from Evil as Yui ‡**; Shin Jung-geun – Steel Rain 2: Summit as Jang Ki-sok; Yoo Yeon-seok – Steel Rain 2: Summit as Jo Seon-sa; Lee Sung-min – The Man Standing Next as President Park; Lee Hee-joon – The Man Standing Next as Kwak Sang-cheo	**Esom – Samjin Company English Class as Jung Yoo-na ‡**; Kim Mi-kyung – Kim Ji-young: Born 1982 as Mi-sook; Park Hye-su – Samjin Company English Class as Shim Bo-ram; Bae Jong-ok – Innocence as Chae Hwa-ja; Lee Re – Peninsula as Jooni
**Best New Actor**	**Best New Actress**
**Teo Yoo – Vertigo as Lee Jin-soo ‡**; Woo Do-hwan – The Divine Move 2: The Wrathful as Loner; Lee Bong-geun – The Singer as Hak-gyoo; Lee Hak-joo – Welcome to the Guesthouse as Joon-geun; Hong Kyung – Innocence as Ahn Jung-soo	**Kang Mal-geum – Lucky Chan-sil as Lee Chan-sil ‡**; Kim So-hye – Moonlit Winter as Sae-bom; Shin Hyun-been – Beasts Clawing at Straws as Seo Mi-ran; Shin Hye-sun – Innocence as Ahn Jung-in; Lee Joo-young – Baseball Girl as Joo Soo-in
**Best New Director**	**Best Screenplay**
**Hong Eui-jeong – Voice of Silence ‡**; Kim Do-young – Kim Ji-young: Born 1982; Kim Cho-hee – Lucky Chan-sil; Yoon Dan-bi – Moving On; Jung Jin-young – Me and Me	**Lim Dae-hyung – Moonlit Winter ‡**; Yoon Dan-bi – Moving On; Woo Min-ho, Lee Ji-min – The Man Standing Next; Hong Eui-jeong – Voice of Silence; Yoo Young-ah – Kim Ji-young: Born 1982 based on Kim Ji-young, Born 1982 by Cho Nam-joo
**Best Short Film**	**Best Cinematography and Lighting**
**The Thread – Cho Min-jae, Lee Na-yeon ‡**; My Son – Jeon Seung-pyo; The Long Night – Kim Jung-min; Us, Day and Night – Kim So-hyoung; A Good Mother – Lee You-jin; Roof-top Star – Lee Kun-hwi; 37-1 Inheung-ri – Kim Jee-hye; Different – Ahn So-hoe; Georgia – Jayil Pak	**Hong Kyung-pyo: Cinematography; Bae Il-hyuck: Lighting – Deliver Us from Evil ‡**; Kim Tae-sung: Cinematography; Song Jae-ho: Lighting – Steel Rain 2: Summit; Go Rak-sun: Cinematography; Lee Seung-bin: Lighting – The Man Standing Next; Kim Sun-ryung: Cinematography; Cho Gyu-young: Lighting – Diva; Lee Hyung-deok: Cinematography; Park Jeong-woo: Lighting – Peninsula
**Best Editing**	**Best Art Direction**
**Han Mi-yeon – Beasts Clawing at Straws ‡**; Jeong Ji-eun – The Man Standing Next; Kim Hyung-joo – Deliver Us from Evil; Park Se-young – Moonlit Winter; Shin Min-gyung – Kim Ji-young: Born 1982	**Bae Jung-yoon – Samjin Company English Class ‡**; Cho Hwa-sung, Park Gyu-bin – The Man Standing Next; Cho Hwa-sung: Production Designer; So Seong-Hyeon: Art Director – Deliver Us from Evil; Lee Mok-won – Peninsula; Cho Hwa-sung: Production Designer; Choi Hyun-seok: Art Director – Forbidden Dream
**Best Music**	**Technical Award**
**Dalpalan – Samjin Company English Class ‡**; Jo Yeong-wook – The Man Standing Next; Mowg – Deliver Us from Evil; Kim Hae-won – Moonlit Winter; Jo Seong-woo – Forbidden Dream	**Jin Jong-hyun – Ashfall (Visual Effects) ‡**; Kim Seo-hee – The Man Standing Next (Makeup); Lee Gun-moon – Deliver Us from Evil (Martial Arts); Jung Hwang-su – Peninsula (Visual Effects); Yoon Jeong-hee – Samjin Company English Class (Costume Design)
**Popular Star Award**	**Audience Choice Award for Most Popular Film**
**Yoo Ah-in, Jung Yu-mi**	**Ashfall**

== Films that received multiple nominations and awards ==
Films with multiple nominations
Nominations	Films
11	The Man Standing Next
9	Deliver Us From Evil
7	Moonlit Winter
6	Kim Ji-young: Born 1982
5	Peninsula
5	Samjin Company English Class
5	Steel Rain 2: Summit
4	Voice of Silence
3	Beasts Clawing at Straws
3	Innocence
3	Moving on
2	Diva
2	Forbidden Dream
2	Lucky Chan-sil

Films with multiple awards
Wins	Films
3	Samjin Company English Class
2	Deliver Us From Evil
2	Moonlit Winter
2	Voice of Silence

== See also ==
- 56th Baeksang Arts Awards
- 56th Grand Bell Awards
- 29th Buil Film Awards
