= Blue Dragon Film Award for Best New Director =

- Awarded for: Best New Director
- Country: South Korea
- Presented by: Blue Dragon Film Awards
- First award: 1963
- Currently held by: Kim Hye-young
- Website: www.blueaward.co.kr

The Blue Dragon Film Award for Best New Director is one of the awards that is presented annually at the Blue Dragon Film Awards by Sports Chosun, which is typically held at the end of the year.

== Winners ==
#	Year	Director	Film
3	1965	Jeong Seung-mun	Yalkae's Story (얄개전)
6	1969	Jung So-young	Women's Quarters (규방)
8	1971	Byun Jang-ho	When a Woman Removes Her Makeup (여자가 화장을 지울 때)
10	1973	Lee Won-se	Me, Myself and I (나와 나)
12	1991	Lee Myung-se	My Love, My Bride
13	1992	Kim Young-bin	Kim's War (김의 전쟁)
14	1993	Lee Hyun-seung	The Blue in You
15	1994	Kim Hong-joon	Rosy Life (장미빛 인생)
16	1995	Lee Min-yong	A Hot Roof (개 같은 날의 오후)
17	1996	Hong Sang-soo	The Day a Pig Fell into the Well
17	1996	Kang Je-gyu	The Gingko Bed
18	1997	Song Neung-han	No. 3
19	1998	Hur Jin-ho	Christmas in August
19	1998	Im Sang-soo	Girls' Night Out
20	1999	Lee Young-jae	The Harmonium in My Memory
21	2000	Ryoo Seung-wan	Die Bad
22	2001	Kim Dae-seung	Bungee Jumping of Their Own
23	2002	Kim In-sik	Road Movie
24	2003	Jang Joon-hwan	Save the Green Planet!
25	2004	Choi Dong-hoon	The Big Swindle
26	2005	Jeong Yoon-cheol	Marathon
27	2006	Lee Hae-young, Lee Hae-jun	Like a Virgin
28	2007	Kim Han-min	Paradise Murdered
29	2008	Lee Kyoung-mi	Crush and Blush
30	2009	Kang Hyeong-cheol	Scandal Makers
31	2010	Kim Kwang-sik	My Dear Desperado
32	2011	Yoon Sung-hyun	Bleak Night
33	2012	Kim Hong-sun	The Traffickers
34	2013	Kim Byung-woo	The Terror Live
35	2014	Lee Su-jin	Han Gong-ju
36	2015	Kim Tae-yong	Set Me Free
37	2016	Yoon Ga-eun	The World of Us
38	2017	Lee Hyun-joo	Our Love Story
39	2018	Jeon Go-woon	Microhabitat
40	2019	Lee Sang-geun	Exit
41	2020	Hong Eui-jeong	Voice of Silence
42	2021	Park Ji-wan	The Day I Died: Unclosed Case
43	2022	Lee Jung-jae	Hunt
44	2023	Ahn Tae-jin	The Night Owl
45	2024	Cho Hyun-chul	The Dream Songs
46	2025	Kim Hye-young	It’s Okay!

== General references ==
- "Winners and nominees lists". Blue Dragon Film Awards (in Korean). Archived from the original on 27 January 2022.
- "Blue Dragon Film Awards". Naver (in Korean).
