= List of 2021 box office number-one films in South Korea =

The following is a list of 2021 box office number-one films in South Korea. When the number-one film in gross is not the same as the number-one film in admissions, both are listed.

== Number-one films ==
†	This implies the highest-grossing movie of the year.

#	Date	Film	Gross	Ref.
1	January 3, 2021	Wonder Woman 1984	$599,498	
2	January 10, 2021	Wonder Woman 1984	$231,544	
3	January 17, 2021	Wonder Woman 1984	$133,169	
4	January 24, 2021	Soul	$2,581,160	
5	January 31, 2021	Soul	$2,322,301	
6	February 7, 2021	Soul	$1,728,495	
7	February 14, 2021	Soul	$1,842,091	
8	February 21, 2021	Mission: Possible	$1,102,142	
9	February 28, 2021	Demon Slayer: Kimetsu no Yaiba the Movie: Mugen Train	$745,938	
10	March 7, 2021	Minari	$1,676,807	
11	March 14, 2021	Minari	$1,089,782	
12	March 21, 2021	Minari	$1,095,606	
13	March 28, 2021	Godzilla vs. Kong	$2,469,206	
13	April 4, 2021	Godzilla vs. Kong	$1,304,425	
14	April 11, 2021	The Book of Fish	$449,858	
15	April 18, 2021	Seo Bok	$1,803,438	
16	April 25, 2021	Recalled	$1,097,642	
17	May 2, 2021	Waiting for Rain	$1,402,942	
18	May 9, 2021	The Croods: A New Age	$1,305,125	
19	May 16, 2021	Spiral: From the Book of Saw	$782,444	
20	May 23, 2021	Fast & Furious 9 THE FAST SAGA	$9,833,610	
21	May 30, 2021	Fast & Furious 9 THE FAST SAGA	$15,188,664	
22	June 6, 2021	The Conjuring: The Devil Made Me Do It	$3,126,611	
23	June 13, 2021	Cruella	$8,286,922	
24	June 20, 2021	A Quiet Place Part II	$3,355,361	
25	June 27, 2021	Hard Hit	$2,979,025	
26	July 4, 2021	Hard Hit	$6,151,898	
27	July 11, 2021	Black Widow	$12,104,742	
28	July 18, 2021	Black Widow	$19,027,461	
29	July 25, 2021	The Boss Baby: Family Business	$2,829,313	
30	August 1, 2021	Escape from Mogadishu	$6,525,098	
31	August 8, 2021	Escape from Mogadishu	$14,466,386	
32	August 15, 2021	Sinkhole	$7,771,401	
33	August 22, 2021	Hostage: Missing Celebrity	$5,407,561	
34	August 29, 2021	Hostage: Missing Celebrity	$9,533,413	
35	September 5, 2021	Shang-Chi and the Legend of the Ten Rings	$6,630,248	
36	September 12, 2021	Shang-Chi and the Legend of the Ten Rings	$10,629,324	
37	September 19, 2021	On the Line	$2,917,364	
38	September 26, 2021	On the Line	$7,983,339	
39	October 3, 2021	No Time to Die	$4,550,023	
40	October 10, 2021	No Time to Die	$8,013,364	
41	October 17, 2021	Venom: Let There Be Carnage	$9,241,421	
42	October 24, 2021	Venom: Let There Be Carnage	$14,014,916	
43	October 31, 2021	Dune	$6,841,301	
44	November 7, 2021	Eternals	$14,311,287	
45	November 14, 2021	Eternals	$21,935,423	
46	November 21, 2021	Perhaps Love	$2,874,128	
47	November 28, 2021	Spiritwalker	$2,959,958	
48	December 5, 2021	Spiritwalker	$5,186,779	
49	December 12, 2021	Romance Without Love	$4,575,880	
50	December 19, 2021	Spider-Man: No Way Home †	$23,522,733	
51	December 26, 2021	Spider-Man: No Way Home †	$41,057,785	
52	January 2, 2022	Spider-Man: No Way Home †	$51,217,511	

== Highest-grossing films ==
International film South Korean film

Highest-grossing films of 2021
Rank	Title	Distributor	Domestic gross
1	Spider-Man: No Way Home	Sony	US$46,648,679
2	Escape from Mogadishu	Lotte Entertainment	$28,955,409
3	Eternals	Disney	$26,583,111
4	Black Widow	Disney	$25,132,866
5	F9	Universal Pictures	$18,483,157
6	Sinkhole	Showbox	$17,777,858
7	Demon Slayer: Kimetsu no Yaiba – The Movie: Mugen Train	Toho	$17,163,308
8	Venom: Let There Be Carnage	Sony	$17,545,295
9	Soul	Disney	$15,816,298
10	Cruella	Disney	$15,997,401

== See also ==
- List of South Korean films of 2021
- Impact of the COVID-19 pandemic on cinema
- List of 2020 box office number-one films in South Korea
- List of 2022 box office number-one films in South Korea
