= List of South Korean films of 2021 =

The following is a list of South Korean films released in 2021.

== Box office ==
The highest-grossing South Korean films released in 2021, by domestic box office gross revenue, are as follows:

Highest-grossing films released in 2021
Rank	Title	Distributor	Domestic gross
1	Escape from Mogadishu	Lotte Cultureworks	$28,955,409
2	Sinkhole	Showbox	$17,926,756
3	Hostage: Missing Celebrity	Next Entertainment World	$13,058,426
4	On the Line	CJ Entertainment	$11,751,610
5	Hard Hit	CJ Entertainment	$7,627,011
6	The Medium	Showbox	$7,238,857
7	Spiritwalker	Megabox JoongAng PlusM	$6,611,996
8	Miracle: Letters to the President	Lotte Cultureworks	$5,559,237
9	Nothing Serious	CJ Entertainment	$5,128,145
10	Perhaps Love	Next Entertainment World	$4,345,842

== Released ==
=== January–March ===
Opening		English title	Native title	Director(s)	Cast	Ref.
J A N U A R Y	1	What Happened to Mr. Cha?	차인표	Kim Dong-kyu	Cha In-pyo, Song Jae-ryong	
J A N U A R Y	6	Finding Angel	천사는 바이러스	Kim Sung-joon	Lee Young-ah, Park Sung-il, Jeon Moo-song, Moon Sook	
J A N U A R Y	14	Cute Man	귀여운 남자	Kim Jung-wook	Shin Min-jae, Lee Jin-ri, Hwang Jung-yoon, Hong Ha-na-im	
J A N U A R Y	14	Loop Dreams	요요현상	Go Du-hyun	Moon Hyun-woong, Kwak Dong-gun, Yoon Jong-gi, Lee Dae-yeol, Lee Dong-hoon	
J A N U A R Y	14	Sword of Sarasen	사라센의 칼	Lim Jae-young	Shin Ji-soo, Park Myung-shin, Kim Feel, Park Song-tek	
J A N U A R Y	14	Little Bird	작은새	Kim Tae-kyun	Lee Ki-hyuk, Lee Hye-ah	
J A N U A R Y	21	Croissant	크루아상	Cho Sung-kyu	Nam Bo-ra, Hyuk	
J A N U A R Y	21	Today, Together 2	오늘, 우리2	Lee Joon-seop, Lee Na-yeon, Yang Jae-joon, Yeo Jang-cheon	Ki Joo-bong, Park Se-jun, Shin Ji-yi, Son Jung-yoon	
J A N U A R Y	21	My Big Mama's Crazy Ride	큰엄마의 미친봉고	Baek Seung-hwan	Jung Young-joo, Kim Ga-eun, Hwang Seok-jeong, Yu Seong-ju, Jo Dal-hwan, Jung Dae-gwan	
J A N U A R Y	21	Bike Guys	바이크 원정대: 인 이탈리아	Go Young-jo	Song Jae-hee, ISU, J.Yoon, Ryuseok, Kim Sun-bin	
J A N U A R Y	27	Three Sisters	세자매	Lee Seung-won	Moon So-ri, Kim Sun-young, Jang Yoon-ju	
J A N U A R Y	28	I Don't Fire Myself	나는 나를 해고하지 않는다	Lee Tae-gyeom	Yoo Da-in, Oh Jung-se	
J A N U A R Y	28	The ABCs of Our Relationship	관계의 가나다에 있는 우리는	Lee In-eui	Eun Hae-seong, Oh Ha-nee, Lee Seo-yoon, Jang Joon-hwi, Kim Ji-na	
J A N U A R Y	28	Rule of the Game: Human Hunting	게임의 법칙: 인간사냥	Lee Soo-sung	Kim Sung-soo, Jo Kyung-hoon, Seo Young	
F E B R U A R Y	3	Stress Zero	스트레스 제로	Lee Dae-hee	Im Chae-heon, Yoo Dong-kyun, Kim Seung-tae	
F E B R U A R Y	3	There Is an Alien Here	이 안에 외계인이 있다	Choi Eun-jong	Jo Byeong-kyu, Bae Noo-ri, Lee Hyun-woong, Tae Hang-ho, Yoon Jin-young	
F E B R U A R Y	5	Space Sweepers	승리호	Jo Sung-hee	Song Joong-ki, Kim Tae-ri, Jin Seon-kyu, Yoo Hae-jin	
F E B R U A R Y	10	I	아이	Kim Hyun-tak	Kim Hyang-gi, Ryu Hyun-kyung, Yeom Hye-ran	
F E B R U A R Y	10	New Year Blues	새해전야	Hong Ji-young	Kim Kang-woo, Yoo In-na, Yoo Yeon-seok, Lee Yeon-hee, Lee Dong-hwi, Chen Duling, Yeom Hye-ran, Choi Soo-young	
F E B R U A R Y	17	Mission: Possible	미션 파서블	Kim Hyung-joo	Lee Sun-bin, Kim Young-kwang	
F E B R U A R Y	17	Double Patty	더블패티	Baek Seung-hwan	Shin Seung-ho, Irene	
F E B R U A R Y	18	Black Light	빛과 철	Bae Jong-dae	Yeom Hye-ran, Kim Si-eun, Park Ji-hu	
F E B R U A R Y	24	Go Back	고백	Seo Eun-young	Park Ha-sun, Ha Yoon-kyung, Kim Woo-gyum, Gam So-hyun, Jung Eun-pyo	
M A R C H	24	The Box	더 박스	Yang Jung-woong	Park Chanyeol, Jo Dal-hwan	
M A R C H	31	The Book of Fish	자산어보	Lee Joon-ik	Sul Kyung-gu, Byun Yo-han	

=== April–June ===
Opening		English title	Native title	Director(s)	Cast	Ref.
A P R I L	9	Night in Paradise	낙원의 밤	Park Hoon-jung	Uhm Tae-goo, Jeon Yeo-been, Cha Seung-won	
A P R I L	15	Seo Bok	서복	Lee Yong-ju	Gong Yoo, Park Bo-gum	
A P R I L	21	Recalled	내일의 기억	Seo Yoo-min	Seo Yea-ji, Kim Kang-woo, Yeom Hye-ran	
A P R I L	28	Waiting for Rain	비와 당신의 이야기	Jo Jin-mo	Kang Ha-neul, Chun Woo-hee, Kang So-ra	
M A Y	19	Aloners	혼자 사는 사람들	Hong Sung-eun	Gong Seung-yeon, Jeong Da-eun, Seo Hyun-woo, Park Jeong-hak	
M A Y	26	Pipeline	파이프라인	Yoo Ha	Seo In-guk, Lee Soo-hyuk, Eum Moon-suk	
M A Y	27	Introduction	인트로덕션	Hong Sang-soo	Shin Seok-ho, Park Mi-so, Kim Min-hee	
J U N E	4	Sweet & Sour	새콤달콤	Lee Gye-byeok	Krystal Jung, Chae Soo-bin, Jang Ki-yong	
J U N E	23	Hard Hit	발신제한	Kim Chang-ju	Jo Woo-jin, Lee Jae-in, Ji Chang-wook	
J U N E	30	Midnight	미드나이트	Kwon Oh-seung	Jin Ki-joo, Wi Ha-joon, Kim Hye-yoon	

=== July–September ===
Opening		English title	Native title	Director(s)	Cast	Ref.
J U L Y	2	The 8th Night	제8일의 밤	Kim Tae-hyung	Lee Sung-min, Park Hae-joon, Kim Yoo-jung	
J U L Y	14	The Medium	랑종	Banjong Pisanthanakun	Narilya Gulmongkolpech, Sawanee Utoomma, Sirani Yankittikan, Yasaka Chaisorn	
J U L Y	28	Escape from Mogadishu	모가디슈	Ryoo Seung-wan	Kim Yoon-seok, Jo In-sung	
J U L Y	28	The Cursed: Dead Man's Prey	방법: 재차의	Kim Yong-wan	Uhm Ji-won, Jung Ji-so, Jung Moon-sung, Kim In-kwon	
A U G U S T	11	Sinkhole	싱크홀	Kim Ji-hoon	Cha Seung-won, Kim Sung-kyun, Lee Kwang-soo, Kim Hye-jun	
A U G U S T	18	Hostage: Missing Celebrity	인질	Pil Kam-sung	Hwang Jung-min	
A U G U S T	25	Guimoon: The Lightless Door	귀문	Shim Duck-geun	Kim Kang-woo, Kim So-hye, Lee Jung-hyung	
S E P T E M B E R	1	Snowball	최선의 삶	Lee Woo-jeong	Bang Min-ah, Shim Dal-gi, Han Sung-min	
S E P T E M B E R	9	Show Me the Ghost	쇼미더고스트	Kim Eun-kyoung	Han Seung-yeon, Kim Hyun-mok, Hong Seung-bum	
S E P T E M B E R	15	Miracle: Letters to the President	기적	Lee Jang-hoon	Park Jung-min, Im Yoon-ah, Lee Sung-min	
S E P T E M B E R	15	On the Line	보이스	Kim Gok, Kim Sun	Byun Yo-han, Kim Mu-yeol, Kim Hee-won	
S E P T E M B E R	16	Cinema Street	영화의 거리	Kim Min-geun	Han Sun-hwa, Lee Wan	

=== October–December ===
Opening		English title	Native title	Director(s)	Cast	Ref.
O C T O B E R	6	F20		Hong Eun-mi	Jang Young-nam, Kim Jung-young, Lee Ji-ha	
N O V E M B E R	10	Tomb of the River	강릉	Yoon Young-bin	Jang Hyuk, Yu Oh-seong	
N O V E M B E R	17	Perhaps Love	장르만 로맨스	Jo Eun-ji	Ryu Seung-ryong, Oh Na-ra, Kim Hee-won	
N O V E M B E R	24	Romance Without Love	연애 빠진 로맨스	Jeong Ga-young	Jeon Jong-seo, Son Suk-ku, Gong Min-jung	
N O V E M B E R	24	Spiritwalker	유체이탈자	Yoon Jae-geun	Yoon Kye-sang, Park Yong-woo, Lim Ji-yeon	
D E C E M B E R	8	Monsta X: The Dreaming	몬스타엑스: 더 드리밍	Oh Yoon-dong, Sung Shin-hyo	Son Hyun-woo, Lee Min-hyuk, Yoo Ki-hyun, Chae Hyung-won, Lee Joo-heon, Im Chang-kyun	
D E C E M B E R	29	A Year-End Medley	해피 뉴 이어	Kwak Jae-yong	Han Ji-min, Lee Dong-wook, Kang Ha-neul, Im Yoon-ah	

== See also ==
- List of 2021 box office number-one films in South Korea
- 2021 in South Korea
- Impact of the COVID-19 pandemic on cinema
