= 20th New York Asian Film Festival =

Asian film festival in New York

- Official poster
- Opening film: Escape from Mogadishu
- Closing film: Sinkhole
- Location: Film at Lincoln Center, New York
- Founded: 2002
- Awards: Uncaged Award: Anima by Cao Jinling
- Hosted by: New York Asian Film Foundation Inc.
- No. of films: 70 films
- Festival date: Opening: 6 August 2021; Closing: 22 August 2021
- Language: International
- Website: NYAFF

New York Asian Film Festival
- 21st 19th

The 20th New York Asian Film Festival was held in New York from 6 August to 22 August 2021. The opening film of the festival was Escape from Mogadishu, a South Korean film by Ryoo Seung-wan. Seventy titles were screened both online, as well as in person. The 20th edition of the festival featured two world premieres, six international premieres, twenty nine North American premieres, eight U.S. premieres and nine New York premieres.

2021's festival featured the first ever outdoor screening of Raymond Lee’s wuxia 1992 film New Dragon Gate Inn at Lincoln Center’s Damrosch Park on August 11. The event was co-presented by Hong Kong Economic and Trade Office in New York.

The Uncaged Award for Best Feature Film was awarded to Anima by Cao Jinling.

== Screening venues ==
- Film at Lincoln Center
- SVA Theatre
- Eventive Virtual
- Film at Lincoln Center's Virtual Cinema
- Damrosch Park

== New sections ==
This year a new section is added to focus on Asian American experience.

- Asian American Focus selection

From 20th edition of the festival the non-competitive films are grouped thematically, in the following categories:

- Beyond Borders
- Crowd Pleasers
- Frontlines
- Genre Masters
- Next/Now
- Standouts
- Vanguards

== Jury ==
- Janice Chua : Vice President of Imagine International.
- Evan Jackson Leong : Director and documentary filmmaker.
- Michael Rosenberg: President of Film Movement.

== Films showcase ==
Highlighted title indicates award winner

Year	Title	Original title	Country	Director	Premiere Status
Opening film
2021	Escape from Mogadishu	모가디슈	South Korea	Ryoo Seung-wan	International Premiere
Asian American Focus
2021	Americanish		USA	Iman K. Zawahry	New York Premiere
2021	A Shot Through the Wall		USA	Aimee Long	New York Premiere
2021	Snakehead (film)		USA	Evan Jackson Leong	Special Premiere
Beyond Borders
2021	The Asian Angel	アジアの天使	Japan, South Korea	Yuya Ishii	North American Premiere
2021	Barbarian Invasion	野蛮人入侵	Malaysia	Tan Chui Mui	North American Premiere
2021	Fighter	파이터	South Korea	Jero Yun	North American Premiere
2020	A Song for You	他与罗耶戴尔	Chinese	Dukar Tserang	North American Premiere
Centerpiece Presentation
2021	Raging Fire	怒火	Hong Kong, China	Benny Chan	International Premiere
China on the Move
2020	Anima	莫爾道嘎	China	Cao Jinling	North American Premiere
2020	The Old Town Girls	兔子暴力	China	Shen Yu	North American Premiere
2020	Tough Out	棒！少年	China	Xu Hui-jing	North American Premiere
Closing film
2021	Sinkhole	싱크홀	South Korea	Kim Ji-hoon	North American Premiere
Crowd Pleasers
2021	All U Need Is Love	總是有愛在隔離	Hong Kong	Vincent Kok	North American Premiere
2020	Breakout Brothers	逃獄兄弟	Hong Kong	Mak Ho Pong	North American Premiere
2020	The Con-Heartist	อ้าย..คนหล่อลวง	Thailand	Mez Tharatorn	North American Premiere
2020	From Today, It's My Turn!!	今日から俺は!!劇場版	Japan	Yuichi Fukuda	US Premiere
2020	Hold Me Back	私をくいとめて	Japan	Akiko Ohku	US Premiere
2021	jigoku-no-hanazono: Office Royale	地獄の花園	Japan	Kazuaki Seki	North American Premiere
2020	My Missing Valentine	消失的情人節	Taiwan	Chen Yu-hsun	New York Premiere
2020	One Second Champion	一秒拳王	Hong Kong	Chiu Sin-hang	North American Premiere
2020	Tonkatsu DJ Agetaro	とんかつDJアゲ太郎	Japan	Ken Ninomiya	North American Premiere
2020	Zero To Hero	媽媽的神奇小子	Hong Kong	Jimmy Wan	North American Premiere
Emerging Voices: Narrative Short Showcase - IRL (In Real Life)
2020	1056 Meters	一〇五六米	Singapore, United States	Edwin Ho	New York Premiere
2020	Chimera	키메라	United States	Eileen Yoon	East Coast Premiere
2020	Just Another Day		India	Prataya Saha	World Premiere
2020	Mother Tongue		United States	Eris Qian	
2020	Piglet Piglet	美豬肉圓	Taiwan	Tsung-Yen Lin	New York Premiere
Emerging Voices: Narrative Short Showcase - Missed Connections
2020	In the Dusk	长河落日	Mongolia	Zhuolan	New York Premiere
2021	Invited In		Hong Kong	Yuyu Kitamura	World Premiere
2020	Journey to the East		USA	Eve Liu	North American Premiere
2020	ufo:pm	午后飞船	Singapore	Xiao Han	New York Premiere
2020	Winter By the River	冬日河		Shuyao Chen	
Frontlines
2020	Babi		Malaysia	Namewee	North American Premiere
2020	A Balance	由宇子の天秤	Japan	Yujiro Harumoto	North American Premiere
2020	I Don't Fire Myself	나는 나를 해고하지 않는다	South Korea	Lee Tae-Gyeom	North American Premiere
2021	Ninja Girl	シュシュシュの娘（こ）	Japan	Yu Irie	World Premiere
2021	A Shot Through the Wall		USA	Aimee Long	New York Premiere
2020	The Silent Forest	無聲	China	Ko Chen-nien	New York Premiere
2020	Three Sisters	세 자매	South Korea	Lee Seung-won	North American Premiere
2020	Tough Out	棒！少年	China	Xu Hui-jing	North American Premiere
2021	The Way We Keep Dancing	狂舞派 3	Hong Kong	Adam Wong	New York Premiere
Genre Masters
2021	Coffin Homes	鬼同你住	Hong Kong	Fruit Chan	North American Premiere
2021	The Fable: The Killer Who Doesn't Kill	ザ・ファブル 殺さない殺し屋	Japan	Kan Eguchi	North American Premiere
2021	Last of the Wolves	孤狼の血 LEVEL2	Japan	Kazuya Shiraishi	North American Premiere
2021	Limbo	智齒	Hong Kong	Soi Cheang	North American Premiere
2021	Midnight	미드나이트	South Korea	Kwon Oh-seung	International Premiere
2021	The Prayer	간호중	South Korea	Min Kyu-dong	International Premiere
2021	Rising Shaolin: The Protector	少林寺之得宝传奇	China	Stanley Tong	International Premiere
2020	Sweetie, You Won't Believe it	ЖАНЫМ, ТЫ НЕ ПОВЕРИШЬ!	Kazakhstan	Yernar Nurgaliyev	North American Premiere
Hong Kong Panorama
1982	Boat People	投奔怒海	Hong Kong	Ann Hui	Retrospective/Tribute Screening
1992	New Dragon Gate Inn	新龍門客棧	Hong Kong	Raymond Lee	NYAFF 20th Anniversary Screening
1981	The Story of Woo Viet	胡越的故事	Hong Kong	Ann Hui	Retrospective/Tribute Screening
Next/Now
2021	Here and There	Dito at Doon	Philippines	JP Habac	North American Premiere
2020	Keep Rolling	好好拍電影	Hong Kong	Man Lim Chung	New York Premiere
2020	Money Has Four Legs	ခြေလေးချောင်း	Myanmar	Maung Sun	North American Premiere
2020	Shadows	殘影空間	Singapore	Glenn Chan	North American Premiere
2020	Snowball	최선의 삶	South Korea	Lee Woo-jeong	International Premiere
2021	Time	殺出個黃昏	Hong Kong	Ricky Ko	North American Premiere
Standouts
2021	Blue	ブルー	Japan	Keisuke Yoshida	US Premiere
2021	The Book of Fish	자산어보	South Korea	Lee Joon-ik	International Premiere
2020	A Leg	腿반	Taiwan	Chang Yao-sheng	U.S. Continental Premiere
2020	Samjin Company English Class	삼진그룹 영어토익반	South Korea	Lee Jong-pil	New York Premiere
2020	Under the Open Sky	すばらしき世界	Japan	Miwa Nishikawa	New York Premiere
Vanguards
2020	As We Like It	揭大歡喜	Taiwan	Muni Wei, Chen Hung-i	East Coast Premiere
2021	Junk Head		Japan	Takahide Hori	U.S. Premiere
2021	Zokki	ゾッキ	Japan	Naoto Takenaka, Takayuki Yamada, Takumi Saitoh	North American Premiere

=== Films by country or region ===
Year	Title	Original title	Region/Country	Director	Premiere status
New Cinema from Japan
2021	Over the Town	街の上で	East Asia	Rikiya Imaizumi	U.S. Premiere
2021	Sensei, Would You Sit Beside Me?	先生、私の隣に座っていただけませんか？	East Asia	Takahiro Horie	World Premiere
South Korea
2021	Ryuk-sa: A Teaser	력사	East Asia	Cho Jin-woong	International Premiere
2021	Spiritwalker	유체이탈자	East Asia	Yoon Jae-keun	North American Premiere

=== Uncaged Award for Best Feature Film Competition ===
Highlighted title indicates award winner

Year	Title	Original title	Country	Director	Award status
2020	Anima	莫爾道嘎	China	Cao Jinling	Won
2020	City of Lost Things	廢棄之城	Taiwan	Yee Chih-yen	
2020	Hand Rolled Cigarette	手捲煙	Hong Kong	Chan Kin-long	Variety Star Asia Award: Gordon Lam
2021	Joint		Japan	Oudai Kojima	
2020	Ten Months	십개월	South Korea	Namkoong Sun	Honorable Mention
2020	Tiong Bahru Social Club		Singapore	Tan Bee Thiam	

== Awards and winners ==
=== Uncaged Award for Best Feature Film ===
Year	Title	Original Title	Country	Director/Actor	Ref.
2020	Anima	莫爾道嘎	China	Cao Jinling	

=== Audience Award ===
Year	Title	Original Title	Country	Director/Actor	Ref.
2021	Americanish		USA	Iman K. Zawahry	
2021	Junk Head		Japan	Takahide Hori	

=== Daniel Craft Award for Excellence in Action Cinema ===
Year	Title	Original Title	Country	Director/Actor	Ref.
2021	Spiritwalker	유체이탈자	South Korea	Yoon Kye-sang	

=== Star Asia Awards ===
Image	Actor/Actress	Country	Ref.
Variety Star Asia Award
	Gordon Lam	Hong Kong	
Variety Star Asia Lifetime Achievement Award
	Ann Hui	Hong Kong	
Rising Star Asia Award
	Sosuke Ikematsu	Japan	
	Janine Gutierrez	Philippines	
	Bang Min-ah	South Korea	
