= Following (2024 film) =

2024 film by Kim Se-hwi

- Theatrical release poster
- Hangul: 그녀가 죽었다
- Lit.: She died
- RR: Geunyeoga jugeotda
- MR: Kŭnyŏga chugŏtta
- Directed by: Kim Se-hwi
- Written by: Kim Se-hwi
- Starring: Byun Yo-han; Shin Hye-sun; Lee El
- Cinematography: Park Seong-ju; Kim Ji-hoon
- Edited by: Kim Jung-hoon
- Music by: Lee Ji-su
- Production company: NGene Film Inc.
- Distributed by: Content Zio Inc. Artist Studio; Moving Pictures Co.
- Release date: May 15, 2024
- Running time: 103 minutes
- Country: South Korea
- Language: Korean
- Budget: ₩4 billion ($2.9 million)
- Box office: ₩12 billion ($8.8 million)

Following (Korean: 그녀가 죽었다) is a 2024 South Korean mystery thriller film written and directed by Kim Se-hwi, starring Byun Yo-han, Shin Hye-sun, and Lee El. The film follows a realtor who habitually sneaks into his clients' homes and becomes obsessed with a deceptive social media influencer. It was released theatrically on May 15, 2024.

== Plot ==
Gu Jeong-tae is a real estate agent with a hobby of peeping into other people's lives by entering their homes using keys entrusted to him by customers. He often steals belongings from the houses as trophies. He becomes interested in and begins to observe Han So-ra, a social media influencer who posts photos of vegan salads while eating convenience store sausages. Furthermore, she has been scamming netizens foe donations to save stray animals. One day, Jeong-tae finds So-ra lying dead on her sofa when he visits her house. Unable to call the police since he believes he would be a prime suspect when the police would find out his breaking-in habit, he tricks a couple who are looking to buy a house to go So-ra's apartment to make them look like the ones that discover the corpse first to avoid suspicion. However, someone has moved So-ra's body and cleaned up the crime scene.

Soon after, someone who knows that he entered So-ra's house starts threatening him. To make matters worse, Oh Young-joo, a homicide detective, starts an investigation with all evidence pointing to Jeong-tae as the criminal. Jeong-tae searches for people around him through So-ra's social media to find the real culprit. During his investigation, he suspects that a rival internet influencer and former friend of So-ra was a culprit after he sneaked into her house and found out about a threatening message on her computer. He also suspects that a middle-age stalker was hired by this influencer to kill So-ra.

The stalker sneaked into Jeong-tae's apartment and the two of them fight, resulting in Jeong-tae successfully chasing the stalker away. He reports the matters to Young-joo but she dismisses the claim since the influencer was the one that filed the missing report on So-ra to begin with. He leads her to his apartment only to find the stalker has been hanged alongside a red envelope containing the pictures of Jeong-tae sneaking into So-ra's apartment and the pictures of him and the stalker. Young-joo attempts to arrest Jeong-tae but he escapes.

He ambushes the rival influencer for the truth and she reveals that the stalker targeted her not So-ra, so she lured him toward So-ra instead of her. It is also revealed that the rival influencer and So-ra are actually partners-in-crime which the influencer would post negative comments to gain sympathy from netizens for larger donations and in return receive 20% in profit from So-ra.

In a flashback, it is shown that So-ra was the prodigal daughter of her parents and that she tried to sell her own brother to human traffickers for quick cash. Her father was disgusted with her behavior and kicked her out of the household and disowned her. To survive, she worked as a hostess but her psychopathic attitude got her fired. She then embarked on a career as a con woman to scam people out of charitable donations. It is revealed that she faked her death to get rid of Jeong-tae since she fears Jeong-tae with his breaking-in habits would discover her dark secrets. Moreover, she planned to have him killed and framed the stalker but Jeong-tae managed to fight back and escape. As the result, she killed the stalker and framed Jeong-tae.

Jeong-tae goes back to his house and So-ra traps him in a scene to make it look to the police as if he had kidnapped her. However, Jeong-tae escapes the police from the scuffle. Young-joo's colleague then reveals to her that the discrepancies of So-ra injuries by pointing out that she should have been dead from Jeong-tae's beating while in captivity judging from what she claimed about what Jeong-tae did to her. Suspicious, Young-joo goes to the nightclub where So-ra used to work and finds out that one of the hostesses had disappeared and suspected that So-ra was responsible. Jeong-tae calls Young-joo and insists that he was not the killer and reveals all of So-ra's scams to her.

Jeong-tae lures So-ra to an underground basement and provokes her to tell the truth about her scams and her attempts to frame him for the killing of the stalker while secretly recording the whole scene using a hidden camera. At the same time, the police discover the buried body of the missing hostess, whom So-ra killed as the hostess blackmailed her by threatening to reveal her past job as a hostess if she did not share the profit of her scams. With all her crimes laid bare, So-ra is arrested and Jeong-tae is vindicated.

== Cast ==
- Byun Yo-han as Gu Jeong-tae
- Shin Hye-sun as Han So-ra
- Lee El as Oh Young-joo
- Yoon Byung-hee as Lee Jong-hak
- Park Ye-ni as Holugi
- Ji Hyun-joon as Detective Jang
- Jang Sung-bum as Seong-yeol
- Shim Dal-gi as Ji-hee
- Park E Hyun as Jo Hye-ran
- Han So-ha as a female police officer
- Lee Se-rang as Jeong-tae's mother
- Park Myung-hoon as a detective team leader

== Production ==
=== Background ===
The film was originally scheduled to be released on September 7, 2022, but the release date was postponed and eventually confirmed to be May 15, 2024. This film marks the reunion of Byun Yo-han and Shin Hye-sun after 7 years since starring in the film A Day. Shin said in an interview that her acting chemistry with Byun matched so well that "there are times when I feel like the wheels are falling into place".

=== Filming ===
Principal photography began in November 2020 and ended in February 2021.

== Reception ==
=== Box office ===
The film was released on May 15, 2024 on 898 screens. It opened at third place at the South Korean box office with 111,777 admissions and a gross of US$780,733. It rose to second place the next day and placed second overall in its opening week, after The Roundup: Punishment. On June 5, the 22nd day of its release, the film exceeded 1 million admissions.

As of July 7, 2024, the film has grossed US$8,527,363 from 1,234,572 admissions, making it the 6th highest grossing film among South Korean films released in 2024.

=== Accolades ===
Award ceremony	Year	Category	Nominee	Result	Ref.
Baeksang Arts Awards	2025	Best New Director – Film	Kim Se-hwi	Nominated	
Director's Cut Awards	2025	Best New Director (Film)	Kim Se-hwi	Nominated	
Director's Cut Awards	2025	Best Actress (Film)	Shin Hye-sun	Nominated	
