= List of 2022 box office number-one films in South Korea =

The following is a list of 2022 box office number-one films in South Korea by week. When the number-one film in gross is not the same as the number-one film in admissions, both are listed.

== Number-one films ==
†	This implies the highest-grossing movie of the year.

#	Date	Film	Weekend gross	Total gross	Ref.
1	January 9, 2022	Spider-Man: No Way Home	$2,672,244	$55,782,781	
2	January 16, 2022	Spider-Man: No Way Home	$1,483,784	$58,234,717	
3	January 23, 2022	Spider-Man: No Way Home	$1,224,437	$60,248,199	
4	January 30, 2022	The Pirates: The Last Royal Treasure	$2,678,474	$3,852,210	
5	February 6, 2022	The Pirates: The Last Royal Treasure	$1,347,152	$8,789,968	
6	February 13, 2022	Death on the Nile	$793,649	$1,145,624	
7	February 20, 2022	Uncharted	$2,108,737	$2,980,819	
8	February 27, 2022	Uncharted	$1,051,964	$4,766,328	
9	March 6, 2022	The Batman	$2,021,577	$4,258,025	
10	March 13, 2022	In Our Prime	$1,103,337	$1,892,228	
11	March 20, 2022	Moonfall	$878,461	$1,164,242	
12	March 27, 2022	Hot Blooded	$1,269,894	$1,729,404	
13	April 3, 2022	Morbius	$1,710,978	$2,482,881	
14	April 10, 2022	Sonic the Hedgehog 2	$842,497	$978,355	
15	April 17, 2022	Fantastic Beasts: The Secrets of Dumbledore	$2,941,713	$4,100,430	
16	April 24, 2022	Fantastic Beasts: The Secrets of Dumbledore	$1,625,593	$6,551,823	
17	May 1, 2022	Fantastic Beasts: The Secrets of Dumbledore	$1,548,285	$8,769,984	
18	May 8, 2022	Doctor Strange in the Multiverse of Madness	$14,426,261	$29,103,967	
19	May 15, 2022	Doctor Strange in the Multiverse of Madness	$7,124,066	$40,782,400	
20	May 22, 2022	The Roundup †	$21,052,559	$29,187,236	
21	May 29, 2022	The Roundup †	$15,170,244	$54,012,159	
22	June 5, 2022	The Roundup †	$10,060,676	$72,978,036	
23	June 12, 2022	The Roundup †	$6,715,633	$84,883,535	
24	June 19, 2022	The Witch: Part 2. The Other One	$8,166,920	$11,618,969	
25	June 26, 2022	Top Gun: Maverick	$9,537,745	$12,827,578	
26	July 3, 2022	Top Gun: Maverick	$9,698,472	$27,591,460	
27	July 10, 2022	Thor: Love and Thunder	$10,013,050	$14,768,921	
28	July 17, 2022	Top Gun: Maverick	$5,736,868	$46,333,879	
29	July 24, 2022	Alienoid	$5,174,594	$7,361,121	
30	July 31, 2022	Hansan: Rising Dragon	$13,388,462	$17,867,611	
31	August 7, 2022	Hansan: Rising Dragon	$9,202,516	$36,158,266	
32	August 14, 2022	Hunt	$8,943,072	$11,981,188	
33	August 21, 2022	Hunt	$5,662,706	$23,641,797	
34	August 28, 2022	Hunt	$2,906,392	$28,735,544	
35	September 4, 2022	6/45	$3,045,848	$8,313,387	
36	September 11, 2022	Confidential Assignment 2: International	$15,889,293	$19,506,102	
37	September 18, 2022	Confidential Assignment 2: International	$6,856,815	$35,078,179	
38	September 25, 2022	Confidential Assignment 2: International	$3,497,029	$39,758,355	
39	October 2, 2022	Confidential Assignment 2: International	$2,201,636	$43,462,599	
40	October 9, 2022	Confidential Assignment 2: International	$1,636,782	$47,004,579	
41	October 16, 2022	Life is Beautiful	$785,505	$5,517,216	
42	October 23, 2022	Black Adam	$2,342,418	$3,157,593	
43	October 30, 2022	Confession	$1,251,426	$1,752,128	
44	November 6, 2022	Confession	$1,353,792	$4,045,725	
45	November 13, 2022	Black Panther: Wakanda Forever	$6,465,075	$8,779,916	
46	November 20, 2022	Black Panther: Wakanda Forever	$5,138,589	$13,919,831	
47	November 27, 2022	The Night Owl	$6,257,280	$6,306,022	
48	December 4, 2022	The Night Owl	$6,990,827	$13,296,849	
49	December 11, 2022	The Night Owl	$5,731,644	$18,987,796	
50	December 18, 2022	Avatar: The Way of Water	$24,786,854	$24,798,396	
51	December 25, 2022	Avatar: The Way of Water	$28,289,916	$53,742,084	
52	January 1, 2023	Avatar: The Way of Water	$21,575,763	$75,878,344	

== Highest-grossing films ==
International film South Korean film

Highest-grossing films of 2022
Rank	Title	Distributor	Domestic gross
1	The Roundup	ABO Entertainment	$103,956,897
2	Top Gun: Maverick	Paramount Pictures	$69,560,907
3	Avatar: The Way of Water	20th Century Studios	$71,493,681
4	Hansan: Rising Dragon	Lotte Entertainment	$58,353,635
5	Confidential Assignment 2: International	CJ Entertainment	$56,149,131
6	Doctor Strange in the Multiverse of Madness	Walt Disney Studios Motion Pictures	$49,603,147
7	Hunt	Megabox JoongAng Plus M	$35,313,446
8	The Night Owl	Next Entertainment World	$24,025,598
9	Jurassic World Dominion	Universal Pictures	$23,148,908
10	The Witch: Part 2. The Other One	Next Entertainment World	$22,899,833

== See also ==
- List of South Korean films of 2022
- Impact of the COVID-19 pandemic on cinema
- List of 2021 box office number-one films in South Korea
- 2022 in South Korea
