= 42nd Blue Dragon Film Awards =

2021 edition of award ceremony

- Official poster
- Awarded for: Excellence in cinematic achievements
- Awarded by: Sports Chosun
- Announced on: November 1, 2021
- Presented on: November 26, 2021
- Site: KBS Hall, Yeouido, Seoul
- Hosted by: Kim Hye-soo; Yoo Yeon-seok
- Organized by: Sports Chosun (a sister brand of Chosun Ilbo)
- Official website: 2021

Highlights
- Best Film: Escape from Mogadishu
- Popular Star Award: Song Joong-ki; Jeon Yeo-been; Im Yoon-ah; Koo Kyo-hwan
- Best Director: Ryoo Seung-wan; Escape from Mogadishu
- Best Actor: Sul Kyung-gu; The Book of Fish
- Best Actress: Moon So-ri; Three Sisters
- Most awards: 5 - Escape from Mogadishu
- Most nominations: 13 - Escape from Mogadishu

Television coverage
- Network: KBS; Naver TV
- Viewership: 836,000 People; Ratings: 5.2%

The 42nd Blue Dragon Film Awards (Korean: 제42회 청룡영화상) ceremony was held on November 26, 2021, at KBS Hall in Yeouido, Seoul. Organized by Sports Chosun (a sister brand of Chosun Ilbo). It was aired live on KBS2 at 20:30 (KST). 18 categories were awarded at the 42nd edition of awards ceremony, hosted by Kim Hye-soo (28th time) and Yoo Yeon-seok (4th time). The nominations for 15 categories were announced for the 172 Korean films released from October 30, 2020, to October 14, 2021, on November 1, 2021. Escape from Mogadishu got 13 nominations in 10 categories, and won 6 awards including best film, popular film and popular star awards.

== Event ==
- 42nd Blue Dragon Film Awards Short Film Competition: From October 6 to October 15, 2021.

== Nominees and winners ==
The nominees for the 42nd Blue Dragon Film Awards were announced on November 1, 2021.

Winners are listed first, highlighted in boldface, and indicated with a double dagger (‡).

- (Winners denoted in **bold**)

**Best Film**	**Best Director**
**Escape from Mogadishu ‡**; The Book of Fish; The Day I Died: Unclosed Case; Space Sweepers; Hostage: Missing Celebrity	**Ryoo Seung-wan – Escape from Mogadishu ‡**; Lee Jun-ik – The Book of Fish; Park Hoon-jung – Night in Paradise; Lee Seung-won – Three Sisters; Jo Sung-hee – Space Sweepers
**Best Actor**	**Best Actress**
**Sul Kyung-gu – The Book of Fish as Jeong Yak-jeon ‡**; Byun Yo-han – The Book of Fish as Jang Chang-dae; Kim Yun-seok – Escape from Mogadishu as Han Sin-seong; Jo In-sung – Escape from Mogadishu as Kang Dae-jin; Song Joong-ki – Space Sweepers as Kim Tae-ho	**Moon So-ri – Three Sisters as Mi-yeon ‡**; Lim Yoona – Miracle: Letters to the President as Song Ra-hee; Jeon Yeo-been – Night in Paradise as Kim Jae-yeon; Jeon Jong-seo – The Call as Oh Young-sook; Kim Hye-soo - The Day I Died: Unclosed Case as Kim Hyeon-soo
**Best Supporting Actor**	**Best Supporting Actress**
**Huh Joon-ho – Escape from Mogadishu as Rim Yong-su ‡**; Lee Sung-min – Miracle: Letters to the President as Tae-yoon; Koo Kyo-hwan – Escape from Mogadishu as Tae Joon-ki; Lee Kwang-soo – Sinkhole as Kim Seung-hyun; Jin Seon-kyu – Space Sweepers as Tiger Park / Park Kyung-soo	**Kim Sun-young – Three Sisters as Hee-sook ‡**; Jang Yoon-ju – Three Sisters as Miok; Lee Jung-eun – The Day I Died: Unclosed Case as Suncheondaek; Lee El – The Call as Ja-ok; Lee Soo-kyung – Miracle: Letters to the President as Bo-kyeong
**Best New Actor**	**Best New Actress**
**Jung Jae-kwang – Not Out as Shin Gwang-ho ‡**; Kim Jae-beom – Hostage: Missing Celebrity as Choi Ki-wan; Nam Da-reum – Sinkhole as Jung Seung-tae; Ryu Kyung-soo – Hostage: Missing Celebrity as Yeom Dong-hun; Ha Jun – Festival as Kim Kyeong-man	**Gong Seung-yeon**– **Aloners as Jin-ah ‡**; Roh Jeong-eui – The Day I Died: Unclosed Case as Se-jin; Bang Min-ah – Snowball as Kang-yi; Lee Yoo-mi – Young Adult Matters as Yoon Se-jin; Jung Soo-jung – More Than Family as Kim To-il
**Best New Director**	**Best Screenplay**
**Park Ji-wan – The Day I Died: Unclosed Case ‡**; Kim Chang-ju – Hard Hit; Lee Woo-jeong – Snowball; Lee Chung-hyun – The Call; Pil Kam-sung – Hostage: Missing Celebrity	**Kim Se-gyeom – The Book of Fish ‡**; Lee Jang-hoon, Son Joo-yeon – Miracle: Letters to the President; Park Ji-wan – The Day I Died: Unclosed Case; Ryoo Seung-wan, Lee Gi-cheol – Escape from Mogadishu; Lee Seung-won – Three Sisters
**Best Editing**	**Best Cinematography and Lighting**
**Kim Jeong-hun – The Book of Fish ‡**; Lee Gang-hui – Escape from Mogadishu; Kim Tae-seong – Hard Hit; Nam Na-young – Space Sweepers; Kim Chang-ju – Hostage: Missing Celebrity	**Lee Eui-tae – The Book of Fish ‡**; Kim Young-ho – Night in Paradise; Choi Young-hwan – Escape from Mogadishu; Byun Bong-sun – Space Sweepers; Jo Young-jik – The Call
**Technical Award**	**Best Art Direction**
**Jeong Seong-jin, Jeong Chol-min – Space Sweepers (VFX) ‡**; TBA – Night in Paradise (martial arts); TBA – Escape from Mogadishu (stunt); TBA – Escape from Mogadishu (special effects); Shim Hyun-seob – The Book of Fish (Costume)	**Kim Bo-mook – Escape from Mogadishu ‡**; Kim Hui-jin – Miracle: Letters to the President; Jang Geun-young – Space Sweepers; Lee Jae-Sung – The Book of Fish; Bae Jeong-yun – The Call
**Best Music**	**Chung Jung-won Best Short Film**
**Bang Jun-seok – The Book of Fish ‡**; Kim Tae-seong – Miracle: Letters to the President; Mowg – Night in Paradise; Bang Jun-seok – Escape from Mogadishu; Dalpalan – The Call	**Motorcycle and Hamburger**; Take Me Home, Country Roads
**Chung Jung-won Popular Star Award**	**Audience Choice Award for Most Popular Film**
**Lim Yoona ‡**; **Koo Kyo-hwan ‡**; **Song Joong-ki ‡**; **Jeon Yeo-been ‡**	**Escape from Mogadishu ‡**

== Multiple nominations and awards ==
The following films received multiple nominations and awards:

Films with multiple nominations
Nominations	Films
13	Escape from Mogadishu
10	The Book of Fish
8	Space Sweepers
6	Miracle: Letters to the President
6	The Day I Died: Unclosed Case
6	The Call
5	Night in Paradise
5	Three Sisters
5	Hostage: Missing Celebrity
2	Sinkhole
2	Snowball
2	Hard Hit

Films with multiple awards
Wins	Films
5	Escape from Mogadishu
5	The Book of Fish
2	Three Sisters

== Performances ==
Order	Artist	Act performed
1	Forestella	Champions
2	Oh My Girl	Dolphin + Dun Dun Dance
3	Holy Bang	Venom by Little Simz + Energy by Sampa the Great ft Nadeem Din-Gabisi

== Gallery ==
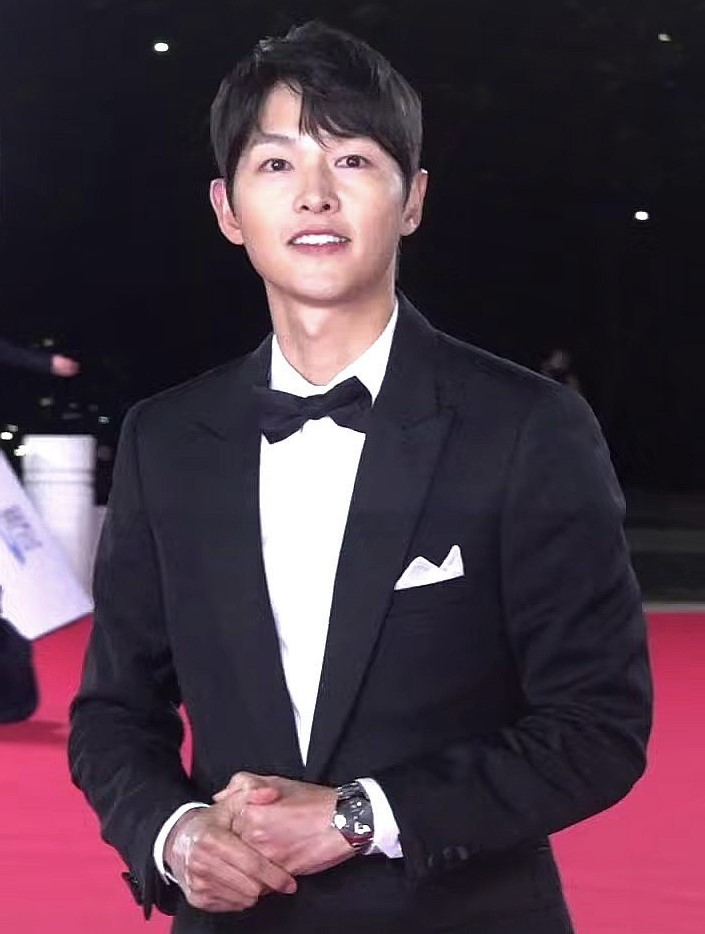
Song Joong-ki

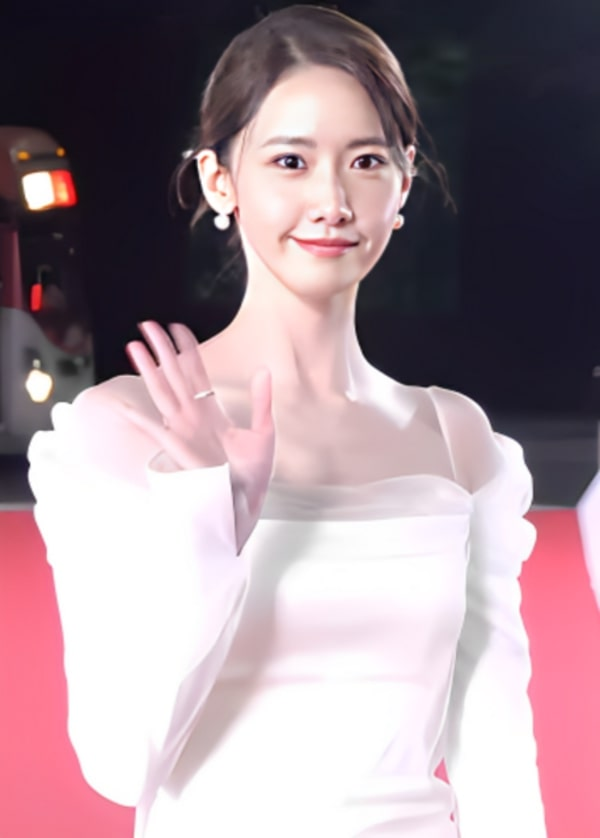
Lim Yoona

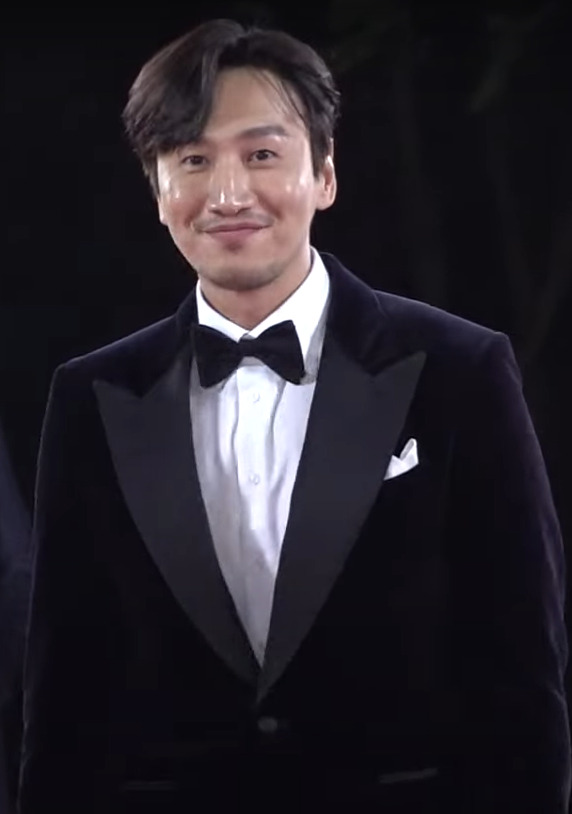
Lee Kwang-soo

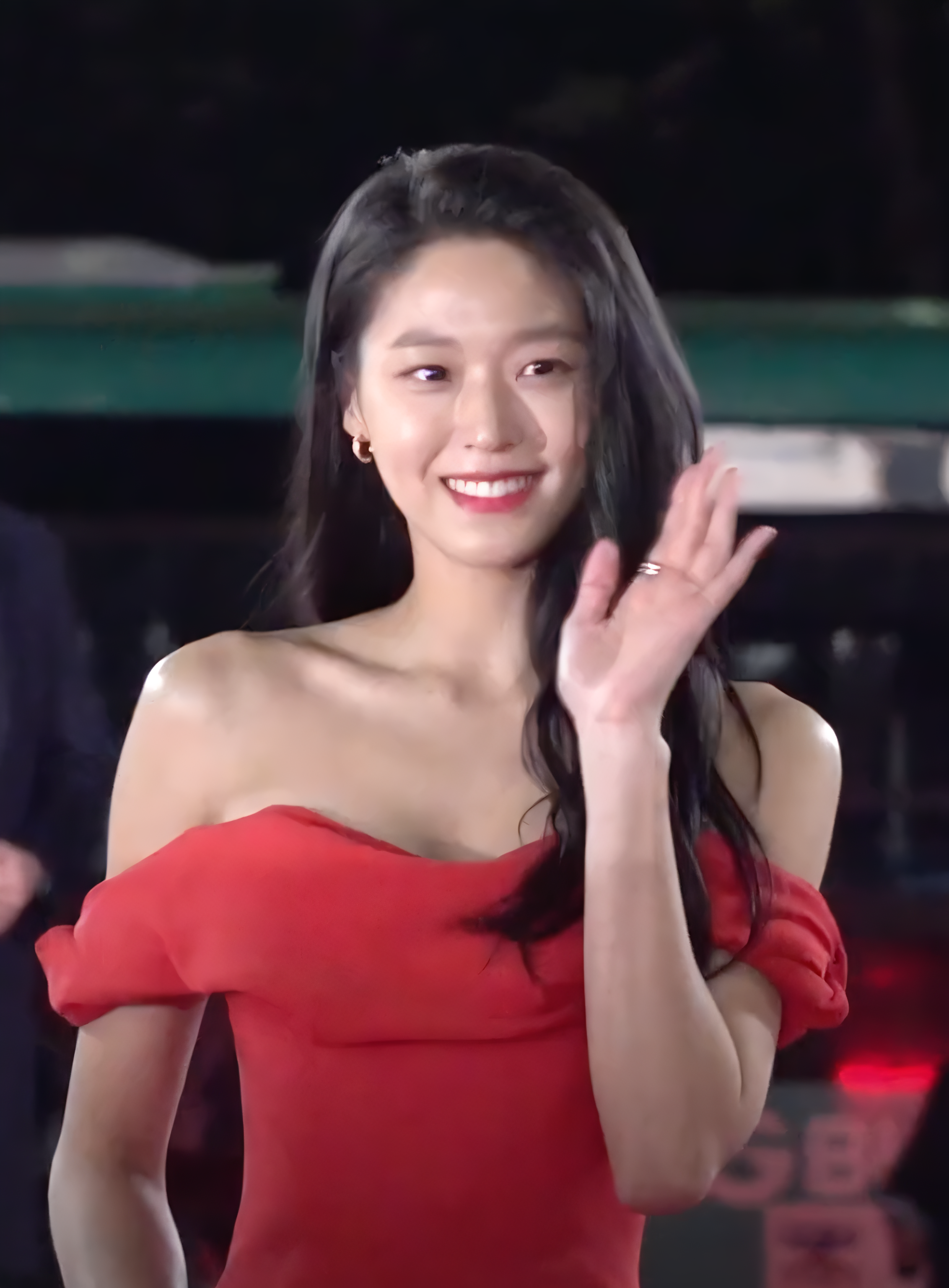
Kim Seol-hyun

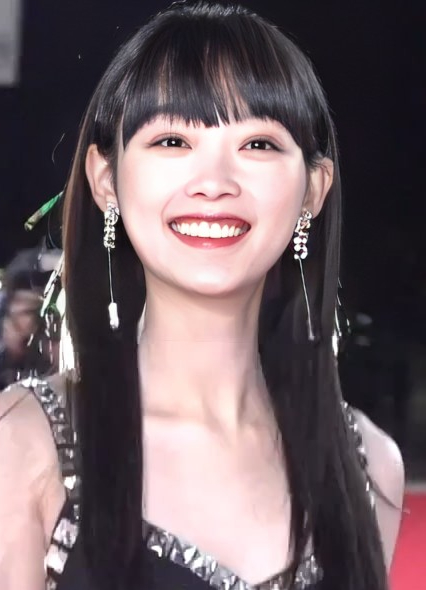
Lee Yoo-mi

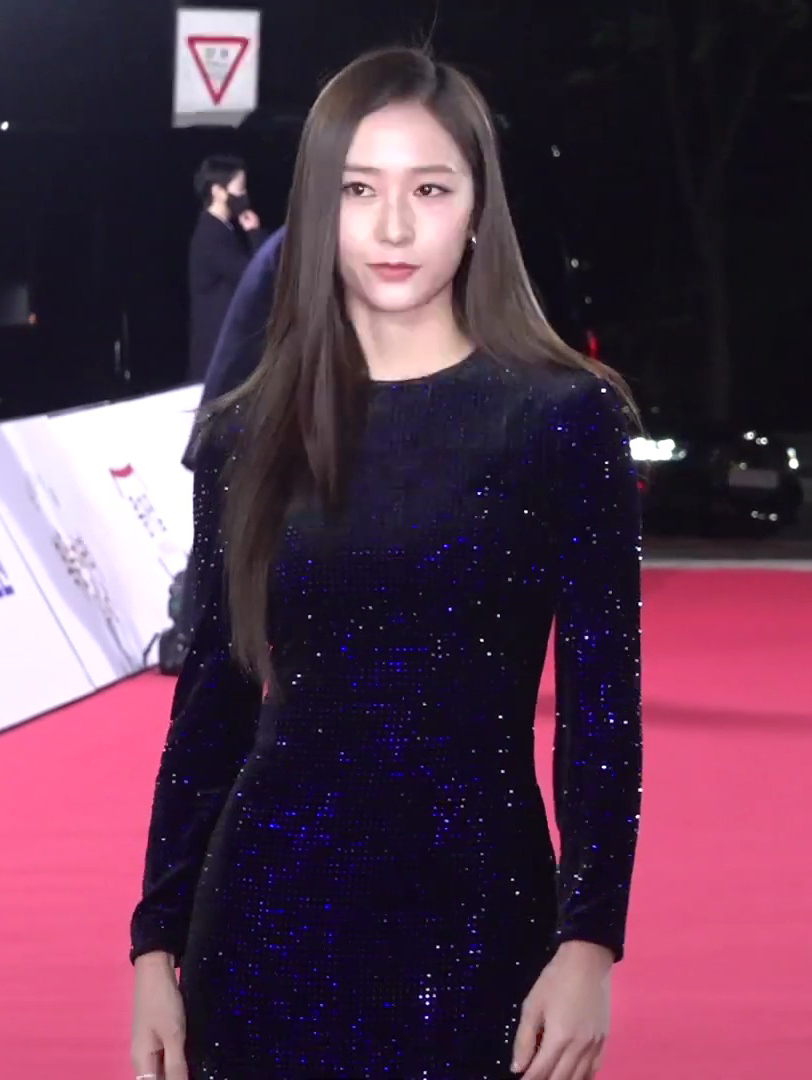
Krystal Jung

== See also ==
- 57th Baeksang Arts Awards
- 56th Grand Bell Awards
- 30th Buil Film Awards
- 15th Asian Film Awards
- 26th Chunsa Film Art Awards
