= Baeksang Arts Award for Best Supporting Actor – Film =

Annual South Korean film award

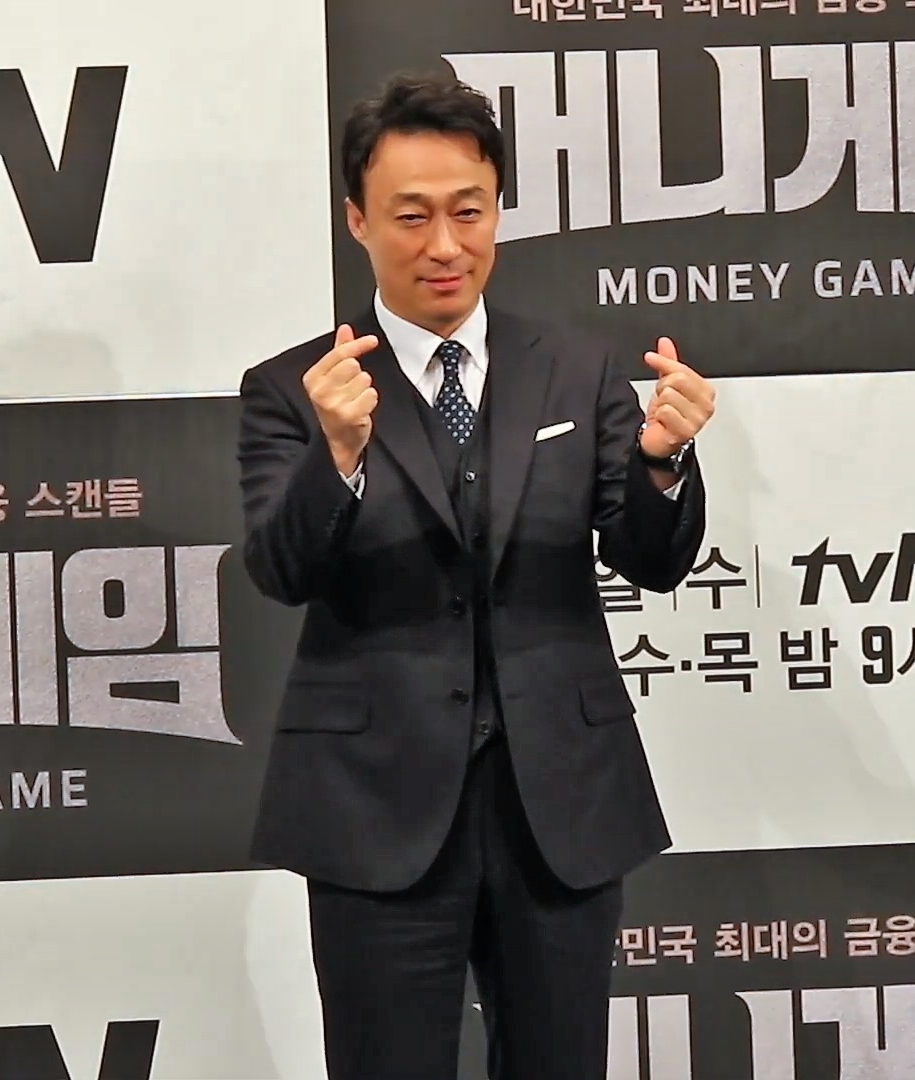
- 2026 recipient: Lee Sung-min
- Awarded for: Best performance by an actor in a supporting role in a South Korean film
- Country: South Korea
- Presented by: Baeksang Arts Awards
- Most recent winner: Lee Sung-min; No Other Choice (2026)
- Website: baeksangartsawards

The Baeksang Arts Award for Best Supporting Actor – Film (Korean: 백상예술대상 영화부문 남자 조연상; RR: Baeksang Yesul Daesang Yeonghwa Bumun Namja Joyeonsang) is an award presented annually at the Baeksang Arts Awards ceremony organised by Ilgan Sports and JTBC Plus, affiliates of JoongAng Ilbo, usually in the second quarter of each year in Seoul. The award was given once in 1977, and introduced as a permanent award in 2013.

== Winners and nominees ==
Table key
‡	Indicates the winner

=== 1970s ===
Year	Winner and nominees	Film	Original title	Role(s)
1977 (13th)	Jang Hyuk ‡	Commando on the Nakdong River	낙동강은 흐르는가	Hwang Sang Sa

=== 2010s ===
Year	Winner and nominees	Film	Original title	Role(s)
2013 (49th)	Ma Dong-seok ‡	The Neighbor	이웃사람	Ahn Hyuk-mo
2013 (49th)	Cho Jin-woong	Perfect Number	용의자X	Detective Jo Min-beom
2013 (49th)	Oh Dal-su	Miracle in Cell No. 7	7번방의 선물	So Yang-ho
2013 (49th)	Park Sung-woong	New World	신세계	Lee Joong-gu
2013 (49th)	Ryu Seung-ryong	All About My Wife	내 아내의 모든 것	Jang Sung-ki
2014 (50th)	Lee Jung-jae ‡	The Face Reader	관상	Grand Prince Suyang
2014 (50th)	Jo Sung-ha	The Suspect	용의자	Kim Seok-ho
2014 (50th)	Kim Eui-sung	The Face Reader	관상	Han Myeonghoe
2014 (50th)	Kwak Do-won	The Attorney	변호인	Cha Dong-young
2014 (50th)	Lee Geung-young	Venus Talk	관능의 법칙	Choi Sung-jae
2015 (51st)	Yoo Hae-jin ‡	The Pirates	해적: 바다로 간 산적	Chul-bong
2015 (51st)	Lee Geung-young	Whistle Blower	제보자	Lee Jang-hwan
2015 (51st)	Park Sung-woong	The Deal	살인의뢰	Gang-chun
2015 (51st)	Song Sae-byeok	A Girl at My Door	도희야	Park Yong-ha
2015 (51st)	Yoo Yeon-seok	The Royal Tailor	상의원	King
2016 (52nd)	Lee Geung-young ‡	Minority Opinion	소수의견	Park Jae-ho
2016 (52nd)	Bae Seong-woo	Office	오피스	Kim Byeong-gook
2016 (52nd)	Cho Jin-woong	Assassination	암살	Chu Sang-ok AKA "Big Gun"
2016 (52nd)	Oh Dal-su	Veteran	베테랑	Team leader Oh
2016 (52nd)	Uhm Tae-goo	Coin Locker Girl	차이나타운	Woo Gon
2017 (53rd)	Kim Eui-sung ‡	Train to Busan	부산행	Yong-seok
2017 (53rd)	Ma Dong-seok	Train to Busan	부산행	Sang-hwa
2017 (53rd)	Bae Seong-woo	The King	더 킹	Yang Dong-chul
2017 (53rd)	Uhm Tae-goo	The Age of Shadows	밀정	Hashimoto
2017 (53rd)	Cho Jin-woong	The Handmaiden	아가씨	Uncle Kouzuki
2018 (54th)	Park Hee-soon ‡	1987: When the Day Comes	1987	Jo Han-kyung
2018 (54th)	Kim Dong-wook	Along with the Gods: The Two Worlds	신과함께-죄와 벌	Kim Soo-hong
2018 (54th)	Kim Hee-won	The Merciless	불한당: 나쁜 놈들의 세상	Byung-gab
2018 (54th)	Jo Woo-jin	Steel Rain	강철비	Choi Myung-rok
2018 (54th)	Jin Seon-kyu	The Outlaws	범죄도시	Wi Seong-rak
2019 (55th)	Kim Joo-hyuk ‡	Believer	독전	Jin Ha-rim
2019 (55th)	Park Hae-joon	Believer	독전	Seon-chang
2019 (55th)	Steven Yeun	Burning	버닝	Ben
2019 (55th)	Jo Woo-jin	The Drug King	마약왕	Jo Seong-kang
2019 (55th)	Jin Seon-kyu	Extreme Job	극한직업	Detective Ma

=== 2020s ===
Year	Winner and nominees	Film	Original title	Role(s)
2020 (56th)	Lee Kwang-soo ‡	Inseparable Bros	나의 특별한 형제	Dong-goo
2020 (56th)	Kim Young-min	Lucky Chan-sil	찬실이는 복도 많지	Jang Guk-young
2020 (56th)	Park Myung-hoon	Parasite	기생충	Geun-sae
2020 (56th)	Won Hyun-joon	The Divine Move 2: The Wrathful	신의 한 수: 귀수편	Shaman Jangsung
2020 (56th)	Lee Hee-joon	The Man Standing Next	남산의 부장들	Kwak Sang-cheon
2021 (57th)	Park Jeong-min ‡	Deliver Us from Evil	다만 악에서 구하소서	Yui
2021 (57th)	Koo Kyo-hwan	Peninsula	반도	Captain Seo
2021 (57th)	Shin Jung-geun	Steel Rain 2: Summit	강철비2	Jang Ki-sok
2021 (57th)	Yoo Jae-myung	Voice of Silence	소리도 없이	Chang-bok
2021 (57th)	Huh Joon-ho	Innocence	결백	Mayor Choo
2022 (58th)	Jo Woo-jin ‡	Kingmaker	킹메이커	Director Lee
2022 (58th)	Koo Kyo-hwan	Escape from Mogadishu	모가디슈	Tae Joon-ki
2022 (58th)	Park Yong-woo	Spiritwalker	유체이탈자	Director Park
2022 (58th)	Sung Yoo-bin	Perhaps Love	장르만 로맨스	Kim Sung-kyung
2022 (58th)	Huh Joon-ho	Escape from Mogadishu	모가디슈	Rim Yong-su
2023 (59th)	Byun Yo-han ‡	Hansan: Rising Dragon	한산: 용의 출현	Wakisaka
2023 (59th)	Kang Ki-young	The Point Men	교섭	Qasim / Lee Bong-han
2023 (59th)	Kim Sung-cheol	The Night Owl	올빼미	Crown Prince Sohyeon
2023 (59th)	Park Ji-hwan	The Roundup	범죄도시2	Jang I-soo
2023 (59th)	Yim Si-wan	Emergency Declaration	비상선언	Jin-seok
2024 (60th)	Kim Jong-soo ‡	Smugglers	밀수	Lee Jang-сhun
2024 (60th)	Park Geun-hyung	Picnic	소풍	Jeong Tae-ho
2024 (60th)	Park Jeong-min	Smugglers	밀수	Jang Do-ri
2024 (60th)	Song Joong-ki	Hopeless	화란	Chi-geon
2024 (60th)	Yoo Hae-jin	Exhuma	파묘	Yeong-geun
2025 (61st)	Yoo Jae-myung ‡	Land of Happiness	행복의 나라	Jeon Sang-doo
2025 (61st)	Koo Kyo-hwan	Escape	탈주	Lee Hyun-sang
2025 (61st)	Park Jeong-min	Uprising	전,란	Lee Jong-ryeo
2025 (61st)	Jung Hae-in	I, the Executioner	베테랑2	Park sun-woo
2025 (61st)	Jo Woo-jin	Harbin	하얼빈	Kim Sang-hyun
2026 (62nd)	Lee Sung-min ‡	No Other Choice	어쩔수가없다	Goo Beom-mo
2026 (62nd)	Ryoo Seung-bum	Good News	굿뉴스	Park Sang-hyeon
2026 (62nd)	Park Hae-joon	Humint	휴민트	Hwang Chi-seong
2026 (62nd)	Yoo Ji-tae	The King's Warden	왕과 사는 남자	Han Myŏnghoe
2026 (62nd)	Jang Yong	People and Meat	사람과 고기	U-sik

== Sources ==
- "Baeksang Arts Awards Nominees and Winners Lists". Naver Movie (in Korean).
- "Baeksang Arts Awards Winners Lists". Baeksang Arts Awards (in Korean).
