= Sinkhole (film) =

2021 South Korean comedy film

- Promotional poster
- Hangul: 싱크홀
- RR: Singkeuhol
- MR: Singk'ŭhol
- Directed by: Kim Ji-hoon
- Screenplay by: Jeon Cheol-hong; Kim Jeong-han
- Produced by: Lee Soo-nam; Kim Yang-yeon
- Starring: Cha Seung-won; Kim Sung-kyun; Lee Kwang-soo; Kim Hye-jun
- Cinematography: Shin Tae-ho
- Edited by: Shin Min-kyung
- Music by: Kim Tae-seong
- Production company: The Tower Pictures
- Distributed by: Showbox
- Release dates: August 6, 2021 (LFF); August 11, 2021 (South Korea)
- Running time: 117 minutes
- Country: South Korea
- Language: Korean
- Budget: ₩15 billion
- Box office: US$18.8 million

Sinkhole (Korean: 싱크홀) is a 2021 South Korean disaster comedy film, directed by Kim Ji-hoon and starring Cha Seung-won, Kim Sung-kyun, Lee Kwang-soo and Kim Hye-jun. It is about an average man's house, that took 11 years to obtain, but going down a sinkhole 500 meters underground in a minute. The film with a production cost of ₩15 billion was slated to release in the Chuseok holidays of 2020 but its release was postponed due to the resurgence of the COVID-19 pandemic. It had its world premiere on August 6, at the 74th Locarno Film Festival held in Locarno, Switzerland. It was released in theatres on August 11, 2021.

At the box office, the film crossed 1 million admissions within 6 days of release and became the fastest Korean film in 2021 to do so. As of December 31, 2021, it is the second highest-grossing Korean film of 2021, with a gross of US$17.97 million and 2.19 million admissions.

== Synopsis ==
Park Dong-won (Kim Sung-kyun) and his family move into a condo purchased after 11 years of labor. They throw a housewarming party and invite their friends. A heavy overnight downpour creates an extremely big sinkhole, and in a mere minute, it engulfs the condominium with the people inside it. Deep down the hole, Park, his neighbor Jeong Man-soo (Cha Seung-won) and the guests have to find a way out. As luck would have it, rain again begins to pour down, filling the sinkhole with water. They must find a solution before time runs out.

== Cast ==
- Cha Seung-won as Jung Man-soo, a resident who struggles day and night to raise his son alone
- Kim Sung-kyun as Park Dong-won, chief at a company who worked hard for 11 years before purchasing his first apartment
- Lee Kwang-soo as Kim Seung-hyun, Dong-won's colleague
- Kim Hye-jun as Hong Eun-joo, Dong-won's colleague
- Nam Da-reum as Jung Seung-tae, Man-soo's son who is not on good terms with his father
- Kim Hong-pa as Department head Seo
- Ko Chang-seok as Rescue captain
- Kwon So-hyun as Young-yi, Dong-won's wife
- Lee Hak-joo as Deputy Jung
- Han Hye-rin as Ahn Hyo-jung
- Kim Jae-hwa as Kyung-mi
- Na Chul as Min-joon
- Jung Yun-ha as Young mother
- Jang Gwang as Elderly laundryman
- Jung Young-sook as Elderly woman Oh
- Jun Eun-mi as Mrs. Oh's daughter
- Oh Ja-hun as Sung-hoon
- Lee Joo-mi as Tae-bo fitness member

== Production ==
The film was made from a production budget of ₩15 billion. In August 2019, Double SG Company confirmed the appearance of Nam Da-reum.

On August 14, 2019, first script reading and examination was held. The principal photography began on August 27. The location of film shooting is Seongwon Elementary School in Chuncheon and Bomnae Film Studio.

== Release ==
It was reported that Showbox locked pre-sales deals on the film to Taiwan (MovieCloud), Hong Kong (Edko Films), Indonesia (Falcon), Philippines (MVP Viva), Singapore, Malaysia, Brunei, Vietnam, Laos, Myanmar, Cambodia and East Timor (Encore Films).

The film was invited to Piazza Grande section of the 74th Locarno Film Festival held from August 4 to 14. It had its world premiere at the film festival on August 6. It was released in theatres on August 11, 2021, in South Korea.

Sinkhole was selected as closing film at the 20th New York Asian Film Festival and screened on August 22 at Silas Theatre and SVA Theatre. It was also invited at the 27th Sarajevo Film Festival held from 13th to 20 August 2021. It was showcased in 'Kinoscope' category of the festival. It was also part of 2021 Vancouver International Film Festival in 'Gateway' section, where it was first screened on October 1, 2021. It was also selected in 'Korean Cinema Today - Panorama Section' at 26th Busan International Film Festival and screened on October 7, 2021. It was also screened at 10th Korean Film Festival Frankfurt on October 22, 2021.

The film was invited at the 40th Brussels International Fantastic Film Festival and was screened for Belgian premiere on September 4, 2022.

== Reception ==
=== Box office ===
The film was released on August 11, 2021, on 1603 screens. As per the Korean Film Council's integrated computer network (KOFIC) the film is ranked number one at Korean box office on the first day of its release. Giving the best opening of year 2021, it beat the record of Escape from Mogadishu by recording 154,665 cumulative audience as of August 11, 2021. The film maintained its number 1 rank on the Korean box office on 2nd day of release with 274,794 cumulative audience. The film by mobilizing 501,233 cumulative audience in 4 days of release became the second Korean film in 2021 to garner 500,000 audience in the shortest period of time. It is also maintaining its number one position at the Korean box office.

The film recorded 1 million cumulative audiences on 6th day of its release, thereby becoming the fastest Korean film of 2021 to cross 1 million mark, beating record of Escape from Mogadishu. It surpassed 1.5 million audience on 11th day of its release, and 2 million on 21st day of release.

Going by Korean Film Council (Kofic) data, it is at 2nd place among all the Korean films released in the year 2021, with gross of US$17.97 million and 2,195,683 admissions, as of as of December 31, 2021.

=== Critical response ===
Jo Eun-ae reviewing the film for Sports Korea praised the performance of ensemble and wrote, "The actors build each character densely and show a dense breathing." Eun-ae felt that humour was built through 'light direction' and wit. Eun-ae opined that in addition to performance of actors, 'spectacular space and visuals' equally contributed to 'perfect sense of presence'. Eun-ae concluded the review as, "[..] it is a pity that the setting is somewhat unrealistic and unreasonable towards the second half. Still, it's fun enough as a disaster blockbuster. The unfamiliar world of a sinkhole 500m underground spread out on the screen is dizzying and fresh until the very end."

Sports TV News reporter Kim Hyeon-rok reviewing the film wrote, "Even if the world collapses, there is room for laughter." She praised the performance of the cast and wrote, "The actors who played as a team and melted into the characters appropriately contributed to the devastating disaster and tragedy harmonized with humor." She praised the erection of set for the film and the way tremors of sinking were picturised, and termed the film as a 'parable' in her words, "It's crazy but it's real".

Choi Young-joo of CBS No Cut News praising the building of set and use of gimbal to show the real shaking of house on sinking, wrote, "The vivid delivery of the message invites the audience to the center of the disaster site." But Young-joo opined that the film had followed the set pattern of a disaster film rather than bringing out the emotion that are inherent in such situations. Young-joo felt that in a disaster situation the victims generally lose the will to live, but in Sinkhole it was shown that they kept the hope for the future until the last moment. And the result was they lifted himself up 500m from the ground, Young-joo concluded, "Perhaps the message the film really wanted to show is here."

Jeong Ha-eun reviewing for Sports Seoul opined that the film was combination of two contrasting genres, comedy and the disaster. She wrote that albeit the film followed the formula of a disaster film, but actors by their witty performance made it possible. She also praised the setting of the sinking building and the shaking, which was perceptibly felt through the movement of gimbal set. Describing the emotions of the characters during the rescue operation, Ha-eun felt that it was not easy to empathize between the gaps of rescue process, ".... as the desperate feelings are left to the victims' families who wait anxiously without knowing whether they are alive or dead on the ground."

== Awards and nominations ==
Year	Awards	Category	Recipient	Result	Ref.
2021	42nd Blue Dragon Film Awards	Best Supporting Actor	Lee Kwang-soo	Nominated	
2021	42nd Blue Dragon Film Awards	Best New Actor	Nam Da-reum	Nominated	
2021	41st Golden Cinema Film Festival	Cinematographers' Choice Popularity Award	Cha Seung-won	Won	
2022	Chunsa Film Art Awards 2022	Technical Award (Art)	Kim Tae-young	Nominated	
