= Tinker Ticker =

- Theatrical poster
- Directed by: Kim Jung-hoon
- Written by: Kim Jung-hoon
- Produced by: Kim Sung-eun
- Starring: Byun Yo-han; Park Jeong-min
- Cinematography: Park Sung-hoon
- Edited by: Kim Jung-hoon
- Music by: Mok Young-jin
- Production company: Korean Academy of Film Arts
- Distributed by: CGV Movie Collage
- Release dates: October 21, 2013 (Tokyo); April 3, 2014 (South Korea)
- Running time: 102 minutes
- Country: South Korea
- Language: Korean
- Box office: US$22,094

Tinker Ticker (Korean: 들개; RR: Deulgae) is a 2013 South Korean crime drama film written and directed by Kim Jung-hoon. It was his first feature-length film, as well as his Korean Academy of Film Arts (KAFA) graduation project. Starring Byun Yo-han and Park Jeong-min, it follows a bombmaker who meets a detonator.

It made its world premiere at the 26th Tokyo International Film Festival (TIFF) in 2013, competing in the inaugural Best Asian Future Film Award category.

== Cast ==
- Byun Yo-han as Park Jung-gu
- Park Jeong-min as Lee Hyo-min
- Kim Hee-chang as Professor Baek
- Oh Chang-kyung as Detective Oh
- Park Seong-il as Han Gyoo-nam
- Yoon Dae Hyung as Pil-gyoon
- Lee Si-won as Si-won
- Um Tae-hwa

== Awards and nominations ==
Year	Award	Category	Nominee	Result
2015	2nd Wildflower Film Awards	Best New Actor	Byun Yo-han	Nominated
