= Junk Head =

2017 Japanese stop-motion animated film

- DVD cover
- Directed by: Takehide Hori
- Written by: Takehide Hori
- Based on: Junk Head 1 by Takehide Hori
- Produced by: Kent Yoshida
- Starring: Takehide Hori; Atsuko Miyake
- Cinematography: Takehide Hori
- Edited by: Takehide Hori
- Music by: Takehide Hori; Yoshiki Kondo
- Release dates: 23 July 2017 (Fantasia); 26 March 2021; (re-edited version)
- Running time: 101 minutes
- Country: Japan
- Language: Japanese

Junk Head (Japanese: ジャンク・ヘッド) is a 2017 Japanese animated post-apocalyptic science fiction film written and directed by Takehide Hori, based on his 2013 short film Junk Head 1. (Note: Hori, Takehide, born in Oita prefecture in 1971, is an interior decorator who has worked on interior designs at a theme park and other facilities.) The film comprises some 140,000 stop-motion shots, and runs for 101 minutes. The story is set in a distant future world where humans have received longevity but lost their fertility, and are nearly extinct by population decline.

Director Guillermo del Toro positively reviewed the film and it won three awards. It is the first film in a planned trilogy, with the second film, Junk World, released in June 2025.

== Production ==
Not only the direction and scenario writing but almost all work, including voices, sculpting puppets, lighting, camera operating, editing, composing music, were, in the beginning, done by Hori alone. At first, he assumed like most people that "films are not a one-man project". Then, hearing that Makoto Shinkai made his first film, Voices of a Distant Star, by himself, and, inspired by Shinkai's story, he decided to try to make a film and ventured into the world of film-making at almost forty years old. However, Hori had neither knowledge nor experience in film-making, and was entirely self-taught. It took Hori four years to make a short version of the film for a preview. He made a long version for theatrical release with a small team. It took around seven years to complete the final product. The short version was released at 2013, the long version was released at 2017 and re-edited long version at 2021.

== Synopsis ==
The story is set in a distant future world where humans have received longevity but lost their fertility, and are nearly extinct by population decline. The protagonist, a cyborg explorer, enters an underground world where artificially created species live. His mission is intended to research for their secrets of reproductivity. As the story goes on, it becomes gradually clear that the underground world is a kind of dystopia where dangerous monsters roam or ambush, and that the artificially created intelligent species developed a unique society. The story ends in an unexpected manner. Director Hori noted the film was the first part of a trilogy. (Note: As of the year 2021, Director Hori was collecting money for making the next film by crowdfunding and running his interior decoration business.)

== Reception ==
The film is described as "grotesque but humorous". A reviewer of the Fantasia International Film Festival 2021 noted that the film might be too weird for more mainstream anime fans. Siddhant Adlakha of Fantastic Festival 2021, Austin, Texas, mentioned that nightmarish creature designs in the film "evoke H.R. Giger". A page for the Festival Européen du Film Fantastique de Strasbourg 2021 guessed that the designs are inspired by not only Giger but also Jerome Bosch and M.C. Escher, and pointed out that the film called to mind Grand-Guignol in its post-apocalyptic and horrifying atmosphere. A curator of the 20th New York Asian Film Festival noted that Director Hori's world may channel to the Brothers Quay, Jan Švankmajer, Terry Gilliam, Edward Gorey and others, on the other hand, emphasized the originality of the Director Hori. Director Guillermo del Toro lauded a short version of the film as a "work of deranged brilliance".

A description by the Japanese Film Festival 2021 in Australia guessed that the film was the humorous appropriation of a classic Nietzschean idea: "God is dead and we killed him". However, the reviewer of the Fantasia Film Festival 2021 opined that Hori could have focused on the narrative themes of the film – the nature of humanity and mortality – but he did not do so, and the protagonist, who is called "God" by the underground residents, is preoccupied with being chased by the monsters and engaging in comedic interactions with different humanoid groups. The reviewer concluded that the film is "about just basking in the cool, creepy world Takahide Hori has created".

A reviewer of Asian movies Kotzathanasis appreciated that the film was made to be virtually silent with the only words uttered actually being incoherent sounds. The reason for the appreciation is that it allowed the spectator to focus on the extraordinary images rather than the dialogue.

== Awards ==
The film won the best animated feature award in the 2017 Fantasia Film Festival. Director Hori won the best director of a new wave feature in the 2017 Fantastic Festival. The film won the Golden Stork in the international animated film competition of the Festival Européen du Film Fantastique de Strasbourg 2021.
