= A Day (film) =

- Theatrical release poster
- Hangul: 하루
- RR: Haru
- MR: Haru
- Directed by: Cho Sun-ho
- Written by: Cho Sun-ho; Lee Sang-hak
- Produced by: Song Ji-eun; Lee Sang-hak
- Starring: Kim Myung-min; Byun Yo-han
- Cinematography: Kim Ji-yong
- Edited by: Shin Min-Kyung
- Music by: Mowg
- Production company: Film Line
- Distributed by: CGV Arthouse
- Release date: June 15, 2017
- Running time: 90 minutes
- Country: South Korea
- Language: Korean
- Box office: US$8.5 million

A Day (Korean: 하루; RR: Haru) is a 2017 South Korean mystery thriller film directed by Cho Sun-ho. The film starring Kim Myung-min and Byun Yo-han, revolves around a father who commits an unethical act in an attempt to save his daughter's life. Three years later, his actions return to haunt him, trapping him in an endless time loop. It was released on June 15, 2017.

== Plot ==
The story starts with a doctor, Kim Joon-young, returning home. His daughter, Eun-jung, dies in a car accident on the same day along with another woman. Kim Joon-young wakes up in what looks like the previous day. He tries to save his daughter but fails, with the day repeating over and over again. The woman's husband also experiences the day repeatedly. They cannot seem to save their loved ones no matter what. Later, they find out that the father of a child whose heart was transplanted without the father's consent and the man who had caused an earlier accident are the two persons whose day is repeating, along with the child father, who is seeking revenge by killing their loved ones. They reconcile to the father after learning that his child's heart is inside of the daughter. Thus, the daughter does not allow his father to die so they save him so that everything returns to normal. The doctor explains the transplant to the press as the movie ends.

== Cast ==
- Kim Myung-min as Kim Joon-young
- Byun Yo-han as Lee Min-chul
- Yoo Jae-myung as Kang-sik
- Jo Eun-hyung as Eun-jung
- Shin Hye-sun as Mi-kyung
- Im Ji-kyu as Yong-sun
- Kim Chae-yeon as Hee-joo
- Jang Dae-woong as Dong-soo
- Kim Hyeong-beom as Kim Kyung-wi
- Kim Ye-joon as Ha-roo
- Lee Yoo-ha as Flight attendant
- Han Hee-jung as Suk-hoon's mother
- Park Min-soo as Suk-ikjhu

== Production ==
A Day reunites the two main actors Kim Myung-min and Byun Yo-han who previously acted together in the historical drama series Six Flying Dragons.

== Reception ==
The film inspired a South Indian political drama movie Maanaadu, in which the protagonist is stuck in a time loop leading to a political assassination.

=== Awards and nominations ===
Year	Award	Category	Recipient	Result
2017	Fantasia International Film Festival	Audience Award for Best Asian Feature Film	A Day	Bronze
2018	Fantasporto	Special Mention	A Day	Won

== See also ==
- List of films featuring time loops
