= Prataya Saha =

Independent filmmaker from India

Prataya Saha is an independent filmmaker, TEDx performer, theatre director and photographer based in Bengaluru and Dubai.

== Early life ==
Prataya was born in Kolkata and attended Calcutta Boys' School. He later moved to Karnataka to pursue a degree in Electrical and Electronics Engineering at Siddaganga Institute of Technology. His interest in photography and storytelling eventually led him to a career in filmmaking.

== Career ==
Saha made his directorial debut in 2016 with Anna's Weekend, which was selected for film festivals in China and the United States. In 2017, he started working with Bengaluru-based production house Red Polka Productions. By 2021, he had directed over 10 films, with screenings at approximately 70 film festivals worldwide, including the New York Asian Film Festival, Oaxaca Film Fest, Flickers' Rhode Island International Film Festival, and the Bengaluru International Short Film Festival. His film "Just Another Day", which addresses gender-based violence, received a special jury prize from the Department of Fine Arts at Kütahya Dumlupinar University in Turkey on November 25, 2021, the International Day for the Elimination of Violence Against Women.

=== Other works ===
In 2020, Saha began directing music videos in collaboration with the Bengaluru‑based production house Desktop Films. The videos have received millions of views online and have been released through major music labels, including T‑Series.
