= On the Line (2021 film) =

2021 South Korean crime action film

- Official release poster
- Hangul: 보이스
- RR: Boiseu
- MR: Poisŭ
- Directed by: Kim Gok; Kim Sun
- Written by: Bae Young-ik
- Produced by: Min Jin-soo; Min Kyu-dong
- Starring: Byun Yo-han; Kim Mu-yeol; Kim Hee-won; Park Myung-hoon
- Cinematography: Lee Seon-yeong
- Edited by: Shin Min-kyung
- Music by: Kim Jun-seong; Jeon Se-jin
- Production company: Sufilm Co. Ltd.
- Distributed by: CJ Entertainment
- Release date: September 15, 2021
- Running time: 109 minutes
- Country: South Korea
- Language: Korean
- Box office: US$12.5 million

On the Line (Korean: 보이스; RR: boiseu; lit. 'Voice') is a 2021 South Korean action crime film, directed by Kim Gok and Kim Sun for Sufilm Co. Ltd. Starring Byun Yo-han, Kim Mu-yeol, Kim Hee-won and Park Myung-hoon, the film revolves around Seo-joon, a victim of voice phishing, who penetrates the perpetrators' organization in China to recover the money.

It was theatrically released on September 15, 2021, coinciding with Chuseok holidays. As of December 12, 2021, it is the fourth highest-grossing Korean film of 2021, with a gross of US$11.87 million and 1.42 million cumulative admissions.

== Synopsis ==
Voice phishing is the use of telephony (often voice over IP telephony) to conduct phishing attacks.

A former detective Seo-joon (Byun Yo-han), now head of the field operations team at the Busan construction site, along with his family and colleagues are victims of voice phishing. He tracks down the organisation and penetrates the call center in China. Surprised by the systemic approach and scale of voice phishing, he meets Pro Kwak (Kim Mu-yeol), the head of the planning. He knew that he had a herculean task ahead of him to recover the scammed money.

== Cast ==
- Byun Yo-han as Seo Joon, a voice phishing victim
- Kim Mu-yeol as Pro Kwak, voice phishing designer
- Kim Hee-won as Lee Kyu-ho, leader of the intelligent crime investigation team set up to eradicate the 'voice phishing' crime
- Park Myung-hoon as Director Cheon at the call center, the home of voice phishing
- Choi Byung-mo Chief Park
- Lee Joo-young as Kkang Chil, hacker
- Won Jin-ah as Mi Yeon, Seo Joon's wife
- Shim So-young as Chinese iron factory accounting clerk
- Lee Kyu-sung is the Youngest of the voice
- Yoon Byung-hee

== Production ==
On November 27, 2019 Byun Yo-han's agency Saram Entertainment confirmed his casting in the film. Kim Mu-yeol joined the cast in December 2019.

In May 2020, the film was wrapped up and work on post-production began.

== Release ==
The film was theatrically released on September 15, 2021, coinciding with the Chuseok holidays. It clashed with Miracle: Letters to the President, which was also released on the same day.

== Reception ==
=== Box office ===
The film was released on September 15, 2021 on 1296 screens. As per Korean Film Council (Kofic) integrated computer network, the film ranks first at the Korean box office for consecutive 2 weeks. It also surpassed a 1 million cumulative audience on the 15th day of its release.

As of December 12, 2021 it is in 4th place among all the Korean films released in the year 2021, with a gross of US$11.87 million and 1.42 million admissions.

=== Critical response ===
SPOTV News reporter Kim Hyun-rok, reviewing the film opined that Voice, a real crime action has been shown from the perspective of both, the victims and the criminals. She said, "[the film] takes the world of voice phishing as one axis, and the pleasure of destroying it on one axis. It added cinematic fun to the taste of looking into the world of crime that I thought I knew but didn't know." She praised the action sequences of the film and actor Byun Yo-han, who as a former police officer and a victim "is in charge of 'real action' [and] dedicated action was added to the emotions that were pressed tightly." Kim also appreciated the "realistic map of voice phishing and capitalism", she concluded, "it [the voice phishing call centre home base and process] is drawn as if it can be grasped by the hand, and the level of immersion is considerable."

Jeong Hwa of Star News reviewing the film opined that the film is educative and informative. It has "a didactic character." Jeong concluded, "Voice is an infotainment movie that is faithful to the two purposes of lessons and vicarious satisfaction. What you suffer knowingly is because you dig into your hopes and fears."
