= Byun Yo-han =

South Korean actor (born 1986)

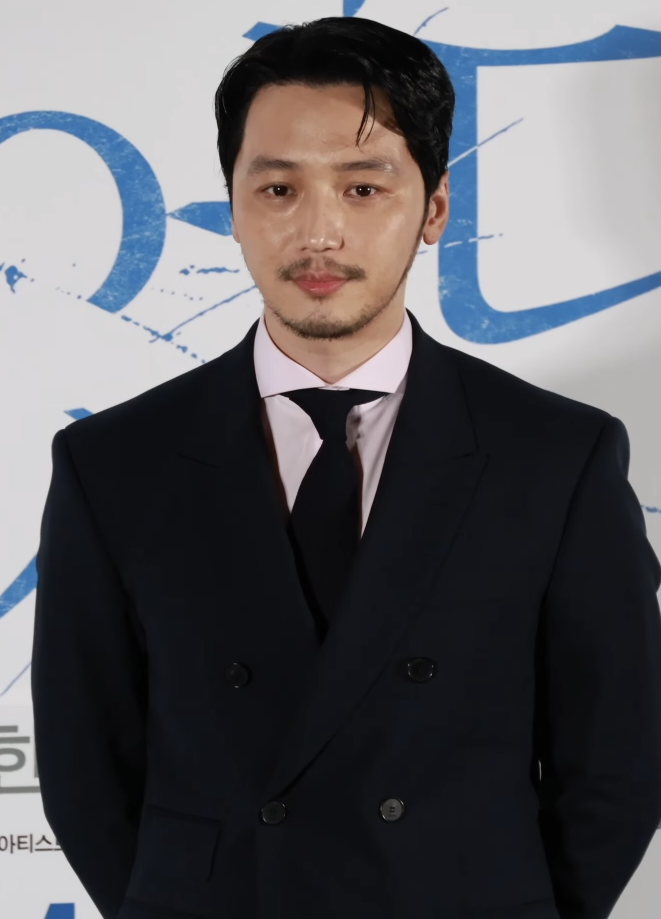
- Byun in April 2024
- Born: April 29, 1986 (age 40); Incheon, South Korea
- Education: Korea National University of Arts
- Occupation: Actor
- Years active: 2011–present
- Agent: TEAMHOPE
- Spouse: Tiffany Young (m. 2026)

Korean name
- Hangul: 변요한
- RR: Byeon Yohan
- MR: Pyŏn Yohan

Byun Yo-han (Korean: 변요한; born April 29, 1986) is a South Korean actor. He is best known for his roles in the television series Misaeng: Incomplete Life (2014), Six Flying Dragons (2015–2016), Mr. Sunshine (2018), and Black Out (2024). He has also appeared in films including Socialphobia (2015), The Book of Fish (2021), Hansan: Rising Dragon (2022), Following (2024), and Pavane (2026).

== Career ==
He made his acting debut in 2011, and appeared in over 30 short films as a student of Korea National University of Arts. The then-unknown actor rose to fame in 2014 with a supporting role in the popular workplace cable series Misaeng: Incomplete Life.

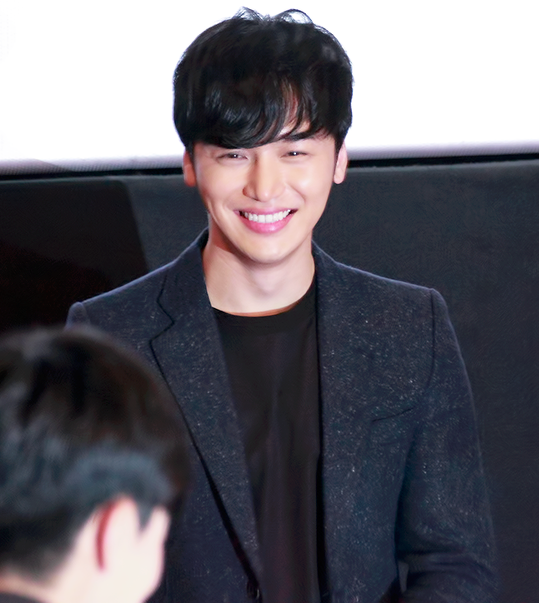
Byun in 2015

In 2015, he starred in leading roles in indie hit Socialphobia and the romantic comedy Ex-Girlfriends' Club. In the same year, he also appeared as one of the six main leads in SBS's 50-episode historical drama Six Flying Dragons playing a master swordsman. Byun then starred alongside Kim Yoon-seok in the fantasy drama film Will You Be There?.

In 2018, he starred in the hit drama Mr. Sunshine, which became one of the highest-rated dramas in Korean cable television history.

In 2021, Byun starred in Lee Joon-ik's black-and-white historical film The Book of Fish, for which he was nominated for the Baeksang Arts Award for Best Actor – Film.

In 2022, Byun starred in Kim Han-min's blockbuster film, Hansan: Rising Dragon (2022). Byun grabbed 6 awards through his role, Japanese naval commander, Wakisaka.

In 2023, Byun was chosen as the representative of "Next Actor" in the 11th Muju Film Festival which was held from June 2–6, 2023. His works and career's history were exhibited in Muju Choibuk Art Museum during the festival.

In 2022, Byun was reported to star alongside Song Kang-ho in Uncle Samsik. Set in the 1960s, the series depicts the intertwined story of two men, exploring themes of pride, greed, and their camaraderie. Shin Yeon-shick wrote and directed the series. It was released worldwide on Disney+ and on Hulu in the USA from May 15 to June 19, 2024.

== Personal life ==
On December 13, 2025, Byun's relationship with American singer-songwriter Tiffany Young became public after he confirmed it through a handwritten letter. Byun's agency, Team Hope, told media outlets that the two were dating seriously with marriage in mind. Young also addressed fans directly via a handwritten letter on Instagram, describing her partner as someone who brought her optimism. The couple reportedly became close after co-starring in the 2024 Disney+ drama Uncle Samsik.

On February 27, 2026, it was reported that Byun and Young had legally registered their marriage. According to an official statement released the same day, the couple completed their marriage registration privately and planned to hold a small, intimate wedding ceremony at a later date.

== Filmography ==
=== Film ===
| Year | Title | Role | Notes | Ref. |
|---|---|---|---|---|
| 2012 | Juvenile Offender | Male guest with donut | Bit part | |
| 2013 | Norigae | Park Ji-hoon | | |
| 2013 | Cold Eyes | M3 | | |
| 2014 | Tinker Ticker | Park Jung-gu | | |
| 2014 | No Tears for the Dead | Song Joon-ki | | |
| 2015 | Socialphobia | Ji-woong | | |
| 2015 | Madonna | Dr. Im Hyeok-gyu | | |
| 2016 | Phantom Detective | Gwang Eun-hoi shadow man | Cameo | |
| 2016 | Will You Be There? | young Han Soo-hyun | | |
| 2017 | A Day | Lee Min-chul | | |
| 2021 | The Sun Does Not Move | David Kim | Japanese film | |
| 2021 | The Book of Fish | Jang Chang-dae | | |
| 2021 | On the Line | Han Seo-joon | | |
| 2022 | Hansan: Rising Dragon | Wakisaka | | |
| 2023 | Believer 2 | Jin Ha-rim | Cameo | |
| 2024 | Following | Gu Jeong-tae | | |
| 2025 | Run to the West | Jang Won | | |
| 2026 | Pavane | Yo-han | | |
| 2026 | The Journey to Gyeongju | Baek Sang-hyeon | | |
| 2026 | Tazza: The Song of Beelzebub | Jang Tae-young | | |
| TBA | Shaving | | | |
| TBA | Pamun | Park Ki-tae | | |
| TBA | The Uninvited | Tae-joo | | |
| TBA | Adenman | | | |

Short film

| Year | Title | Role | Ref. |
|---|---|---|---|
| 2011 | Working on Saturday | Do-yeon | |
| 2011 | Seventeen in Summer | Tae-gu | |
| 2011 | Dear Catastrophe | Yo-han | |
| 2012 | The Night of the Witness | Yoo Ji-hoon | |
| 2012 | Crow Boy | Beom-jun | |
| 2012 | Picnic Together | Tamiya Takuya | |
| 2012 | Magic Hour | Sang-hoon | |
| 2013 | Three Mirrors | Stalker | |
| 2013 | Hyun-soo's Story | —N/a | |
| 2016 | Nowhere Boy | Beom-joon | |
| 2018 | My Dream Class | Han Gi-tak | |

=== Television series ===
| Year | Title | Role | Notes | Ref. |
|---|---|---|---|---|
| 2012 | Vampire Prosecutor 2 | Kim Joon | Cameo (Episode 1) | |
| 2014 | Misaeng: Incomplete Life | Han Seok-yool | | |
| 2015 | Ex-Girlfriends' Club | Bang Myung-soo | | |
| 2015–2016 | Six Flying Dragons | Ddang-sae / Lee Bang-ji | | |
| 2018 | Mr. Sunshine | Kim Hee-sung | | |
| 2024 | Uncle Samsik | Kim San | | |
| 2024 | Black Out | Go Jung-woo | | |

=== Television shows ===
| Year | Title | Role | Ref. |
|---|---|---|---|
| 2025 | Edward Lee's Country Cook | Cast member | |

== Theater ==
| Year | Title | Role | Ref. |
|---|---|---|---|
| 2016 | Hedwig | Hedwig | |

== Accolades ==
=== Awards and nominations ===
Name of the award ceremony, year presented, category, nominee of the award, and the result of the nomination
| Award ceremony | Year | Category | Nominee / Work | Result | Ref. |
|---|---|---|---|---|---|
| APAN Star Awards | 2015 | Best New Actor | Misaeng: Incomplete Life | Won | |
| Asia Model Awards | 2022 | Asia Star Award | Byun Yo-han | Won | |
| Baeksang Arts Awards | 2015 | Best New Actor – Film | Socialphobia | Nominated | |
| Baeksang Arts Awards | 2016 | Best New Actor – Television | Six Flying Dragons | Nominated | |
| Baeksang Arts Awards | 2016 | Most Popular Actor (TV) | Six Flying Dragons | Nominated | |
| Baeksang Arts Awards | 2021 | Best Actor – Film | The Book of Fish | Nominated | |
| Baeksang Arts Awards | 2023 | Best Supporting Actor – Film | Hansan: Rising Dragon | Won | |
| Blue Dragon Film Awards | 2015 | Best New Actor | Socialphobia | Nominated | |
| Blue Dragon Film Awards | 2021 | Best Actor | The Book of Fish | Nominated | |
| Blue Dragon Film Awards | 2022 | Best Supporting Actor | Hansan: Rising Dragon | Won | |
| Blue Dragon Series Awards | 2024 | Best Actor | Uncle Samsik | Nominated | |
| Buil Film Awards | 2015 | Best New Actor | Socialphobia | Won | |
| Buil Film Awards | 2021 | Best Actor | The Book of Fish | Nominated | |
| Buil Film Awards | 2022 | Popular Star Award | Hansan: Rising Dragon | Won | |
| Busan Film Critics Awards | 2021 | Best Actor | The Book of Fish | Won | |
| Cine21 Film Awards | 2015 | Best New Actor | Socialphobia | Won | |
| Chunsa Film Art Awards | 2016 | Best New Actor | Socialphobia | Nominated | |
| Chunsa Film Art Awards | 2022 | Best Supporting Actor | Hansan: Rising Dragon | Nominated | |
| Director's Cut Awards | 2022 | Best Actor in film | The Book of Fish | Nominated | |
| Director's Cut Awards | 2023 | Best Actor in film | Hansan: Rising Dragon | Nominated | |
| Golden Cinematography Awards | 2017 | Popularity Award | Will You Be There? | Won | |
| Grand Bell Awards | 2017 | Best New Actor | Will You Be There? | Nominated | |
| Grand Bell Awards | 2022 | Best Supporting Actor | Hansan: Rising Dragon | Won | |
| Korea Arts and Culture Award | 2022 | Actor in Film section | Voice | Won | |
| Korea Culture and Entertainment Awards | 2021 | Best Actor – Film | Voice and The Book of Fish | Won | |
| Korea Film Reporters Association Awards | 2016 | Best New Actor | Socialphobia | Won | |
| Korea Musical Awards | 2017 | Best New Actor | Hedwig and the Angry Inch | Nominated | |
| Marie Claire Asia Star Awards | 2022 | Asian Star Award | Hansan: Rising Dragon | Won | |
| Marie Claire Asia Star Awards | 2026 | Asian Star Award | Byun Yo-han | Won | |
| MBC Drama Awards | 2024 | Best Actor Award | Black Out | Won | |
| SBS Drama Awards | 2015 | Excellence Award, Actor in a Serial Drama | Six Flying Dragons | Won | |
| SBS Drama Awards | 2015 | New Star Award | Six Flying Dragons | Won | |
| Star Night - Korea Top Star Awards Ceremony | 2015 | Popular Movie Star | Socialphobia | Won | |
| Seoul Global Movie Awards | 2024 | Best Actor | Following | Won | |
| Seoul Independent Film Festival | 2014 | Independent Star Award | Socialphobia | Won | |
| Wildflower Film Awards | 2015 | Best New Actor | Tinker Ticker | Nominated | |

=== State honors ===
Name of country or organization, year given, and name of honor or award
| Country or Organization | Year | Honor or Award | Ref. |
|---|---|---|---|
| Newsis K-Expo Cultural Awards (Note: Established in 2019 and co-sponsored by Korea's Ministry of Culture, Sports and Tourism, Ministry of Foreign Affairs, Korea Creative Content Agency, Seoul Metropolitan Council and the Seoul Tourism Organization, it awards cultural icons, businesses, and individuals who have contributed greatly to Hallyu, the Korean wave.) | 2024 | National Assembly Culture, Sports and Tourism Committee Award | |

=== Listicles ===
Name of publisher, year listed, name of listicle, and placement
| Publisher | Year | Listicle | Placement | Ref. |
|---|---|---|---|---|
| Korean Film Council | 2021 | Korean Actors 200 (Note: Introduces 200 actors that best represent the present and future of Korean cinema to the people in the film industry all over the world.) | Included | |
