= Spiritwalker (film) =

2021 South Korean mystery film

- Theatrical release poster
- Hangul: 유체이탈자
- Hanja: 遺體離脫者
- Lit.: Out of Body
- RR: Yuche italja
- MR: Yuch'e it'alcha
- Directed by: Yoon Jae-geun
- Written by: Yoon Jae-geun
- Produced by: Jang Won-seok; Lee So-young
- Starring: Yoon Kye-sang; Park Yong-woo; Lim Ji-yeon; Park Ji-hwan
- Edited by: Hwang Eun-ju; Choe Seul-mi
- Music by: Kang Nene
- Production companies: Saram Entertainment; BA Entertainment
- Distributed by: Avio Entertainment; Megabox JoongAng PlusM
- Release dates: August 22, 2021 (NYAFF); November 24, 2021 (South Korea)
- Running time: 108 minutes
- Country: South Korea
- Language: Korean
- Box office: US$6.6 million

Spiritwalker (Korean: 유체이탈자) is a 2021 South Korean action fantasy film written and directed by Yoon Jae-geun. Starring Yoon Kye-sang, Park Yong-woo, Lim Ji-yeon, and Park Ji-hwan, the film revolves around an amnesiac man who subsequently wakes up in a new body every twelve hours. It premiered at the 20th New York Asian Film Festival on August 22, 2021, and was released theatrically on November 24, 2021, in South Korea.

== Premise ==
After waking up from a car crash unable to remember anything about his life, a secret agent named Kang I-an begins regaining consciousness in a new body every 12 hours. He must piece together his identity, all while evading attacks from pursuing agents and dangerous criminals alike, but with no memory and allies.

== Cast ==
- Yoon Kye-sang as Kang I-an, a secret agent
- Park Yong-woo as Director Park, a secret agent
- Lim Ji-yeon as Moon Jin-ah, is looking for Kang Eui-ah
- Park Ji-hwan as Haengryeo, Kang I-an's helper, a homeless person.
- Yoo Seung-mok as Chief Lee Shin-woo
- Lee Sung-wook as Yoo Dae-ri, a co-worker of Kang I-an
- Seo Hyun-woo as Baek Sang-sa
- Lee Woon-san as Ji Cheol-ho
- Hong Ki-joon as Go Joong-sa
- Joo Jin-mo as Director Hong
- Park Min-jung as Cake Lady
- Kim Min-kyung as Chairwoman Jeon
- Heo Dong-won as Fur coat

== Production ==
On January 21, 2019, it was reported that Lim Ji-yeon has joined Yoon Kye-sang as female lead for the film tentatively titled as 'Fluid Renegades'. Yoon Kye-sang has acted as a mirror in 7 roles as he wakes in a different body after every 12 hours.

Filming began on January 15, 2019, after completion of casting line up.

== Release ==
Spiritwalker had its premiere at the 20th New York Asian Film Festival on August 22, 2021. It was also invited to the 53rd Sitges Film Festival in the 'Fantastic Panorama' section held from October 8 to 18, 2020. Apart from these festivals the film was invited to 5 other major film festivals as 17th British Mayham Film Festival, the 35th German Fantasy Filmfest, The 6th London East Asian Film Festival, the 21st Trieste Science Fiction Film Festival, and the 41st Hawaii International Film Festival.

It has been sold to 107 countries before its theatrical release on November 24, 2021, in South Korea.

=== Home media ===
The film was made available for streaming on IPTV (KT Olleh TV, SK Btv, LG U+ TV), Home Choice (cable TV VOD), KT SkyLife TV, TVING, Naver TV, Wavve, Google Play, Cinefox, and KakaoPage from December 21, 2021.

== Reception ==
=== Box office ===
The film was released on November 24, 2021, on 1213 screens. As per Korean Film Council (Kofic) integrated computer network, the film ranked first on the Korean box office on the opening weekend with 362,424 admissions. It kept its first place at the end of 2nd week with 679,919 admissions.

As of December 31, 2021 it is at 7th place among all the Korean films released in the year 2021, with a gross of US$6.62 million and 810,673 admissions.

=== Critical response ===
Kim Mi-hwa from Star News reviewed that she praised the performance of the actors and wrote, "If you expect solid acting and action from the actors, you will be able to feel the joy at the cinema after a long time since [onset of] Corona." Kang Hyo-jin from SPOTV News, referring to the 2015 film Beauty Inside and 2002 film The Bourne Identity stated, "[it is the work] that gives the feeling of 'Beauty Inside' wearing the mask of 'Bon'". She concluded writing, "It contains interesting materials, cool and stylish action, and even a storyline that unravels the mystery. However, as the overall texture is good, even a small hole is a big disappointment." Kim Bo-ra from Yonhap News Agency referring to 1997 film Face/Off, 2000 film Memento, 2016 Japanese animated romantic fantasy film Your Name and Bourne Series stated, "Spritwalker combines the two subgenres in a more complicated way, placing the memory-impaired hero in a predicament by having his spirit transfer to another body every 12 hours." Kim concluded, "the film features Ian's mysterious situations and journey for personal identity from the beginning and catches the eyes of viewers with high-speed car chases, gun shootouts and hand-to-hand fight scenes."

== Remake ==
Spiritwalker will be remade for United States audiences by Lorenzo di Bonaventura, who has produced G.I. Joe and Transformers film series.

== Awards and nominations ==
Year	Awards	Category	Recipient	Result	Ref.
2021	20th New York Asian Film Festival	Daniel Craft Award for Excellence in Action Cinema	Spiritwalker	Won	
2022	58th Baeksang Arts Awards	Best Supporting Actor	Park Yong-woo	Nominated	
2022	58th Grand Bell Awards	Best Supporting Actress	Lim Ji-yeon	Nominated	
