= The Book of Fish =

2021 South Korean historical film

- Theatrical release poster
- Hangul: 자산어보
- Hanja: 玆山魚譜
- RR: Jasaneobo
- MR: Chasanŏbo
- Directed by: Lee Joon-ik
- Written by: Kim Se-gyeom
- Produced by: Kim Seong-cheol
- Starring: Sul Kyung-gu; Byun Yo-han
- Cinematography: Lee Eui-tae
- Edited by: Kim Jeong-hun
- Music by: Bang Jun-seok
- Production company: Cineworld
- Distributed by: Megabox Plus M M-Line Distribution
- Release date: 31 March 2021
- Running time: 126 minutes
- Country: South Korea
- Language: Korean
- Box office: US$2.6 million

The Book of Fish (Korean: 자산어보; RR: Jasaneobo) is a 2021 South Korean black-and-white historical drama film directed by Lee Joon-ik. The film starring Sul Kyung-gu and Byun Yo-han, is about an exiled Joseon era scholar and a fisherman and their exchange of knowledge in writing a book. It was theatrically released on March 31, 2021.

The film won the Grand Prize at 57th Baeksang Arts Awards in May 2021.

== Background ==
The Book of Fish is set in 1801 about the Joseon era scholar Jeong Yak-jeon (1758–1816). He was exiled to Heuksando Island during the Catholic Persecution of 1801 in King Sunjo of Joseon's reign. There he wrote a piscine encyclopedia titled Jasaneobo. In the film a fictional character Chang-dae, a young, conservative and eager to learn fisherman is introduced.

== Plot ==
In the first year of King Sunjo's reign, Jeong Yak-jeon is exiled to the remote island of Heuksan due to the Sinyu Persecution. Curious by nature, Jeong Yak-jeon becomes fascinated by marine life and decides to write a book about it. To do so, he seeks help from a young fisherman, Chang-dae, who knows the sea better than anyone. However, Chang-dae refuses outright, declaring that he cannot assist a criminal.

Upon discovering that Chang-dae struggles with self-studying, Jeong Yak-jeon proposes an exchange of knowledge. Though reluctant at first, Chang-dae eventually agrees. Despite their frequent bickering, the two gradually become both teachers and friends to each other. But when Jeong Yak-jeon learns that Chang-dae's true motivation for studying is solely to achieve success, he is deeply disappointed. Likewise, Chang-dae realizes that his path is different from Jeong Yak-jeon's and makes up his mind to leave his mentor's side and step out into the wider world.

== Cast ==
- Sul Kyung-gu as Jeong Yak-jeon
- Byun Yo-han as Jang Chang-dae
- Lee Jung-eun as woman from Gageo
- Min Do-hee as Bok-rye
- Cha Soon-bae as Poong-heon
- Kang Ki-young as Lee Kang-hwe
- Dong Bang-woo as Magistrate of Naju
- Jung Jin-young as King Jeongjo
- Kim Eui-sung as Official Jang
- Bang Eun-jin as Changdae's mother
- Ryu Seung-ryong as Jeong Yakyong
- Jo Woo-jin as Byeol-jang
- Choi Won-young as Jeong Yak-jong
- Yoon Kyung-ho as Moon Soon-deuk
- Jo Seung-yeon as Yi Byeok

== Production ==
The Book of Fish is a black and white film, which are making a comeback in South Korea.

Filming

Filming was wrapped up on November 15, 2019.

== Release ==
The film was theatrically released on March 31, 2021 by Megabox.

The Book of Fish has been invited at the 20th New York Asian Film Festival. It was featured in 'Standouts' strand and screened at Lincoln Center and SVA Theatre in the two-week festival held from August 6 to 22, 2021 in New York. It was also selected in 'Korean Cinema Today - Panorama Section' at 26th Busan International Film Festival and will be screened in the festival in October 2021. The film was also screened at 10th Korean Film Festival Frankfurt on October 23, 2021. On May 6, 2022, it was screened at the Habitat International Film Festival (HIFF), at the Habitat Center in New Delhi.

In 2022, it was selected as one of the films in 'The Actor, Sol Kyung-gu' special exhibition event at 26th Bucheon International Fantastic Film Festival to honour actor Sul Kyung-gu.

== Reception ==
=== Box office ===
The film released on March 31, 2021, on 1250 screens. It was at the number 1 place at the Korean box office by collecting 54,000 audiences on the weekend, taking its total commutative audience to 255,000 persons in the second week of its release.

According to Korean Film Council data†, it is at 14th place among all the Korean films released in the year 2021, with gross of US$2.71 million and 342,540 admissions, as of December 11, 2021.

- †The system of KOBIS (Korean Box Office Information System) is managed by KOFIC.

=== Critical response ===
Going by Korean review aggregator Naver Movie Database, the film holds an approval rating of 9.11 from the audience.

Kim Boram reviewing The Book of Fish for Yonhap wrote that the film keeps interest of the viewers alive as the tone is not serious. He considered that the beautiful scenery of Heuksando Island made the viewing pleasurable. He praised the performances of Sul Kyung-gu as an open-minded scholar and Byun Yo-han as Chang-dae, a young but conservative fisherman. Concluding the review Boram said, "The black-and-white cinematography makes the movie feel like a Joseon Dynasty ink painting, .... and the viewers even get the sense that color is not really important in the script-driven and performance-based piece."

== Awards and nominations ==
Year	Awards	Category	Recipient	Result	Ref.
2021	57th Baeksang Arts Awards	Grand Prize	Lee Joon-ik	Won	
2021	57th Baeksang Arts Awards	Best Film	The Book of Fish	Nominated	
2021	57th Baeksang Arts Awards	Best Director	Lee Joon-ik	Nominated	
2021	57th Baeksang Arts Awards	Best Actor	Byun Yo-han	Nominated	
2021	57th Baeksang Arts Awards	Best Actor	Sul Kyung-gu	Nominated	
2021	57th Baeksang Arts Awards	Best Screenplay	Kim Se-kyum	Nominated	
2021	57th Baeksang Arts Awards	Best Cinematography	Lee Eui-tae	Nominated	
2021	Chunsa Film Art Awards 2021	Best Director	Lee Joon-ik	Nominated	
2021	Chunsa Film Art Awards 2021	Best Actor	Sul Kyung-gu	Nominated	
2021	Chunsa Film Art Awards 2021	Best Screenplay	Kim Se-gyeom	Nominated	
2021	30th Buil Film Awards	Best Film	The Book of Fish	Nominated	
2021	30th Buil Film Awards	Best Director	Lee Joon-ik	Won	
2021	30th Buil Film Awards	Best Actor	Byun Yo-han	Nominated	
2021	30th Buil Film Awards	Best Actor	Sul Kyung-gu	Nominated	
2021	30th Buil Film Awards	Best Supporting Actor	Jo Woo-jin	Nominated	
2021	30th Buil Film Awards	Best Supporting Actress	Lee Jung-eun	Nominated	
2021	30th Buil Film Awards	Best Screenplay	Kim Se-gyeom	Nominated	
2021	30th Buil Film Awards	Best Cinematography Award	Lee Eui-tae	Nominated	
2021	30th Buil Film Awards	Best Art/Technical Award	Lee Jae-Sung	Nominated	
2021	15th Asian Film Awards	Best Film	The Book of Fish	Nominated	
2021	15th Asian Film Awards	Best Director	Lee Joon-ik	Nominated	
2021	15th Asian Film Awards	Best Costume Design	Shim Hyun-seob	Nominated	
2021	15th Asian Film Awards	Best Art Director	Lee Jae-Sung	Nominated	
2021	42nd Blue Dragon Film Awards	Best Film	The Book of Fish	Nominated	
2021	42nd Blue Dragon Film Awards	Best Director	Lee Jun-ik	Nominated	
2021	42nd Blue Dragon Film Awards	Best Actor	Sol Kyung-gu	Won	
2021	42nd Blue Dragon Film Awards	Best Actor	Byun Yo-han	Nominated	
2021	42nd Blue Dragon Film Awards	Best Screenplay	Kim Se-gyeom	Won	
2021	42nd Blue Dragon Film Awards	Best Cinematography	Lee Eui-tae	Won	
2021	42nd Blue Dragon Film Awards	Best Editing	Kim Jeong-hun	Won	
2021	42nd Blue Dragon Film Awards	Best Music	Bang Jun-seok	Won	
2021	42nd Blue Dragon Film Awards	Technical Award	Shim Hyun-seob (Costume)	Nominated	
2021	42nd Blue Dragon Film Awards	Best Art Direction	Lee Jae-Sung	Nominated	
2021	Korean Association of Film Critics Awards	Best Film	The Book of Fish	Won	
2021	Korean Association of Film Critics Awards	Best Actor	Sol Kyung-gu	Won	
2021	Korean Association of Film Critics Awards	Best Screenplay	Kim Se-gyeom	Won	
2021	Korean Association of Film Critics Awards	FIPRESCI Award	Lee Jun-ik	Won	
2021	41st Golden Cinematography Awards	Best Actor	Sol Kyung-gu	Won	
2021	41st Golden Cinematography Awards	Best Film	The Book of Fish	Won	
2021	41st Golden Cinematography Awards	Best Director	Lee Jun-ik	Won	
2021	41st Golden Cinematography Awards	Best Cinematography	Lee Eui-tae	Won	
2021	41st Golden Cinematography Awards	Best New Actress	Min Do-hee	Won	
2021	8th Korean Film Writers Association Awards	Best Director	Lee Jun-ik	Won	
2021	8th Korean Film Writers Association Awards	Best Actor	Sul Kyung-gu	Won	
2021	8th Korean Film Writers Association Awards	Best Music	Bang Jun-seok	Won	
2021	Busan Film Critics Awards	Best Actor	Byun Yo-han	Won	
2022	Director's Cut Awards	Best Director	Lee Joon-ik	Won	
2022	Director's Cut Awards	Best Screenplay	Kim Se-gyeom	Won	
