= Escape from Mogadishu =

2021 South Korean action drama film

- Theatrical release poster
- Hangul: 모가디슈
- RR: Mogadisyu
- MR: Mogadisyu
- Directed by: Ryoo Seung-wan
- Screenplay by: Ryoo Seung-wan; Lee Gi-cheol
- Produced by: Kang Hye-jung; Kim Yong-hwa
- Starring: Kim Yoon-seok; Zo In-sung; Huh Joon-ho; Koo Kyo-hwan; Kim So-jin; Jung Man-sik
- Cinematography: Choi Young-hwan
- Edited by: Lee Gang-hui
- Music by: Bang Jun-seok
- Production companies: Dexter Studios; Filmmaker R&K
- Distributed by: Lotte Entertainment
- Release date: July 28, 2021
- Running time: 121 minutes
- Country: South Korea
- Languages: Korean; English; Somali
- Budget: US$18.3 million
- Box office: US$29.9 million

Escape from Mogadishu (Korean: 모가디슈; RR: Mogadisyu; lit. 'Mogadishu') is a 2021 South Korean political action thriller film directed by Ryoo Seung-wan, and starring Kim Yoon-seok, Zo In-sung, Huh Joon-ho, Koo Kyo-hwan, Kim So-jin, and Jung Man-sik. The film, based on real events, is set during the overthrow of Siad Barre and the two Koreas' efforts to be admitted to the United Nations in the late 1980s and early 1990s. It depicts details of a perilous escape attempt made by North and South Korean diplomats stranded during the conflict.

With a production cost of ₩24 billion, Escape from Mogadishu was anticipated to release in the summer of 2020 but its release was postponed due to the resurgence of the COVID-19 pandemic. It was released theatrically on July 28, 2021, by Lotte Entertainment in IMAX format. It received generally positive reviews from critics, who praised its action scenes, humorous plot, direction, and its vivid acting performances.

The film grossed over $29 million worldwide, becoming the highest-grossing Korean film of 2021. It was selected as the South Korean entry for the Best International Feature Film at the 94th Academy Awards, but it was not nominated.

== Plot ==
In 1990, Somalia is ravaged by a civil war between the Barre government and rebels led by Mohamed Farrah Aidid. Meanwhile, both the North and South Korean embassies are lobbying to be admitted into the United Nations and looking towards the Somali government for support. As South Korean ambassador Han Sin-seong confronts his North Korean counterpart, Rim Yong-su, at a hotel for sabotaging his appointment with President Barre, they find that the rebels have entered Mogadishu.

As clashes break out, Aidid threatens embassies who refuse to support him. Both the North and South Koreans realize that they must immediately leave Somalia. Sin-seong and an intelligence officer, Kim Dae-jin, head to the airport but are sent back as they lack official papers. Likewise, the North Koreans fail to make it to the airport and are sent back. In desperation, North Korean intelligence officer Tae Jun-ki seeks help from rebels he had hired to sabotage the South Koreans. Instead, the rebels betray him and ransack the embassy. Yong-su then orders an evacuation to the Chinese embassy, only to find it abandoned and looted. They are discovered by a group of child soldiers, prompting the North Koreans to play dead before fleeing. Stumbling right outside the South Korean embassy, Yong-su yells for sanctuary, despite Jun-ki protesting that they would be called traitors in Pyongyang. Just then, a group of rebels approach but are repelled by embassy security. Seeing the North Koreans in danger, Sin-seong, who overhears them, lets them all in.

The suspicious North Koreans refuse to eat the food prepared by the South Koreans before Sin-seong reassures them by swapping his rice bowl with Yong-su's and eating from it. Dae-jin, sensing a propaganda opportunity, covertly takes pictures of the meal and steals the North Koreans's diplomatic passports to make defection certificates, but is discovered by Jun-ki, leading to a fistfight. Yong-su and Sin-seong separate them, reiterating the need to set aside political differences to escape. With both the Americans and Chinese already having left, both ambassadors agree to seek help from their other remaining allies. While the North Koreans are rebuffed by the Egyptian embassy, the South Koreans are informed by the Italian embassy that they can join a Red Cross evacuation flight to Kenya, but that the North Koreans cannot, as Italy and North Korea lack diplomatic relations. Sin-seong convinces the Italian ambassador to relent by lying that the North Koreans are defecting.

The Koreans bulletproof their cars with bags of dirt and books, and make white flags from their clothes. The convoy departs during salah, allowing them to pass unscathed while the rebels are in prayer. At a Somali army roadblock, Dae-jin, driving the lead car, negotiates with the commander for passage, but Sin-seong's secretary, driving the last car, sticks his white flag out of the window. The guards mistake the pole for a gun and start firing at the Koreans, forcing them to retreat. The convoy, already being pursued by the Somali army, runs into a group of rebels, who chase after them as well. Eventually, the Koreans arrive right outside the Italian embassy as the Somali army and the rebels retreat. Italian troops open the gates and secure the Koreans. Jun-ki, whose car had separated from the convoy and was last to arrive, dies after having been shot in the chase; he is buried inside the Italian embassy.

The next day, the Koreans board the plane to Kenya. As they land, Sin-seong see that both parties have separate delegations waiting to receive their respective groups. Yong-su and Sin-seong conclude that they cannot be seen together, as neither nation will believe their experiences but instead punish them. As passengers exit the plane, the diplomats bid each other farewell, before promptly splitting into their original groups to join their respective delegations, who take them into buses traveling on opposite directions.

== Cast ==
- Kim Yoon-seok as Han Sin-seong, Ambassador of South Korea to Somalia
- Zo In-sung as Kang Dae-jin, a South Korean ANSP operative and attached as counselor of the embassy
- Huh Joon-ho as Rim Yong-su, Ambassador of North Korea to Somalia
- Koo Kyo-hwan as Tae Jun-ki, a North Korean MSS operative and attached as counselor of the embassy
- Kim So-jin as Kim Myung-hee, wife of Ambassador Han
- Jung Man-sik as Gong Su-cheol, secretary of Ambassador Han
- Kim Jae-hwa as Jo Soo-jin, staff officer of the Embassy of South Korea
- Park Kyung-hye as Park Ji-eun, translator of the Embassy of South Korea
- Enrico Ianniello as Ambassador Mario Sica

=== Special appearance ===
- Yoon Kyung-ho as ANSP senior operative
- Peter Kawa as Khalil, a corrupt police officer
- Alex Kinuthia as Hassan, a rebel
- Alan Oyugi as the Somali Minister of Foreign Affairs
- Andrew Ng'ang'a as Swama, a Somali employee of the Embassy of South Korea

== Production ==
Escape from Mogadishu was based on the 2006 novel Escape, a fictionalized account written by former South Korean ambassador to Somalia Kang Shin-sung regarding an incident in 1991 during the Somali Civil War when the South Korean embassy in Mogadishu sheltered their North Korean counterparts before evacuating to the Italian embassy and fleeing to Kenya together, after which the North Koreans separated. Director Ryoo Seung-wan also partially based his script on records kept by the US embassy in Somalia.

On June 10, 2019, Kim Yoon-seok and Zo In-sung positively considered appearing for the film. This was first appearance of the actors together as well as their first appearance in a Ryoo Seung-wan film. Huh Joon-ho confirmed his appearance in June 2019.

The film was entirely shot in Morocco in the second half of 2019. The post production work started in May 2020.

== Release ==
On July 22, 2021, CJ CGV announced that the film would be screened at all theaters including IMAX, ScreenX, 4DX, and 4DX screens starting on July 28, 2021. It is the second Korean film after the 2020 action-horror film Peninsula to simultaneously screen in all formats in the CGV special theaters.

Escape from Mogadishu was invited to be the opening film of the 20th New York Asian Film Festival. The two-week festival was held from August 6 to 22, 2021 in New York. The film was screened at Walter Reade Theater, Film at Lincoln Center on August 6, 2021, and at 10th Korean Film Festival Frankfurt on October 20, 2021, as opening film. The film was invited to the New Zealand International Film Festival in Wellington edition was screened on November 5, 2021. It was also screened as the opening film of 16th London Korean Film Festival on November 8, 2021.

The film was screened in 42 theaters in North America by August 11, 2021.

In April 2022, it was selected at the 24th edition of Far East Film Festival at Udine held from April 22 to 30.

It was re-released in its second run on September 7, 2022, in theatres coinciding with Chuseok holidays.

=== Home media ===
The film was made available for streaming globally on Amazon Prime Video from February 2022. Soon after, it was released in India.

== Reception ==
=== Box office ===
The film was released on July 28, 2021, on 1,688 screens. According to the integrated computer network for movie theater admissions by the Korea Film Council (KoFiC), the film ranked at first place at the Korean box office by recording 75,624 pre-order audiences as on July 28, 2021, surpassing the audiences of Jungle Cruise. The film set the record for the best opening of the year 2021 for all the Korean films released as of July 28, by getting 126,626 audience on the day of release. The film maintained its first place at the Korean box office on second day with addition of 89,826 viewers and taking cumulative audience to 226,569. The film by mobilizing 540,000 cumulative audience in 4 days of release became the first Korean film in 2021 to garner 500,000 audience in the shortest period of time. It is also maintaining its number one position at the Korean box office.

The film garnered 1 million cumulative audiences in 7 days of release, thereby becoming highest grosser Korean film of 2021 surpassing the box office figures of film Hard Hit. It surpassed 2 million cumulative audience on 17th day of its release and 3 million on 33rd day of release. It took 56 days for the film to cross 3.5 million mark. It is the first Korean film to cross 3.5 million cumulative audience in 2021.

According to Korean Film Council (Kofic) data, as of December 31, 2021 it is the second highest-grossing film among all the films released in the year 2021 in South Korea, and highest-grossing Korean film with gross of US$29 million and 3.61 million admissions. And, as per Box Office Mojo it ranks 89 at 2021 Worldwide Box Office.

=== Critical response ===
On the review aggregator website Rotten Tomatoes, 95% of 44 critics' reviews are positive, with an average rating of 7.60/10. The website's critics consensus reads: "Its depiction of actual events is questionable, but Escape from Mogadishu is sleekly effective as an intelligent, well-acted action thriller." On Metacritic, which uses a weighted average, the film holds a score of 71/100 based on 9 critics, indicating "generally favorable" reviews.

Kim Ji-eun reviewing for Newsis wrote that the action scenes were spectacular and the humor, though small, stood out. She opined that the film vividly portrayed the horrors of war and the emotions of the characters who faced it. Kim felt that the exotic scenery of Morocco, the filming location, in itself was the main character in the film. Ending her review she wrote, "It's not light entertainment. While the heavy historical background and setting dominate the screen, attention is focused on what kind of variable the restrained emotion that utilizes reality, will affect the box office performance."

Kim Seong-hyeon writing for YTN felt that director Ryoo Seung-wan had reproduced the Somali civil war in 1990 as if it were in 2021, and portrayed the tense situation so well that the audience would experience it vividly. Mentioning the escape scene from the city center, Kim said that it was a highlight of the film. The reviewer felt that even in tense situations the humor was well placed. He pointed out that some conversations and actions of characters and of the Somali people seemed to contain intentional messages, but concluded the review with, "Nevertheless, Escape from Mogadishu offers intense cinematic pleasure enough to offset all of this."

Kim Ji-won of Ten Asia opened the review writing, "Audio-visual pleasure and humanism that transcends ideology are properly harmonized. .... the action scenes contain the desperate psychology of the characters, bringing both entertainment and depth." She opined that the escape scene was highlight of the film, as the sequence conveyed the hopelessness of the characters, the horrors of war and the smell of sweat. She praised the performance of ensemble and wrote, ".... the supporting actors played their roles in their respective places, completing a lively story." Concluding her review, Kim wrote, "Most of the Korean films, which are about inter-Korean conflicts, use a squeezing code of tears, but Escape from Mogadishu gives a neat impression with dramatic and simple expressions without being overly emotional."

Cary Darling reviewing the film rated it 4 out of 5 stars and expressed the opinion that, "[..] an involving and suspenseful action-thriller that Ryoo Seung-wan handles with flair, capably staging big action scenes — like the final, nerve-rattling drive to potential salvation — while not neglecting the human stories at their heart."

Roger Moore reviewing the film rated it 3.5 out of 5 stars, and wrote that the sets of firefights were as good as Ridley Scott's Black Hawk Down, but the struggle to escape was more on a human level than a flamboyant one. He liked the climax scenes where convoy of cars were moving in a hail of Molotov cocktails and bullets, and concluded, "You want great action? Eschew the comic book movies and read a few subtitles. Escape from Mogadishu is in a league of its own this summer."

Richard Kuipers of Variety praising the screenplay and direction by Ryoo Seung-wan said, "propulsive and intelligently written South Korean adventure thriller" has been 'energetically' directed. He also praised the performance of its ensemble cast. Kuipers appreciating the climax of chasing bashed-up cars on the streets of Mogadishu concluded, "Even though the outcome is never in doubt, the execution of this survival run is genuinely thrilling."

Evan Dossey of Midwest Film Journal wrote that the characters of the film are aptly defined. He praised Ryoo Seung-wan's script and said, "[he] makes sure the conflicts are expressed through compelling, well-developed characters." Dossey concluded, "Escape from Mogadishu is a tense political thriller so don't go in expecting an action film. [....] instead, prepare yourself for a well-written story of conflicting politics that asks where nationality must end for humanity to persevere."

Panos Kotzathanasis reviewing for HanCinema highlighted three elements of the direction of Ryoo Seung-wan in the film. In his opinion the first was characterization, which has helped the actors to give laudable performances. The second was the action for which Kotzathanasis praised the cinematography of Choi Young-hwan, terming it "exceptional", and the editing of Lee Gang-hui. And the third was narrative, having humor, "[..] which appears in the most unexpected moments in order to lighten the mood". Kotzathanasis ends the review with, "Escape from Mogadishu is a great action movie that also works very well on a contextual level, due to the plethora of sociopolitcal elements included."

Anna Smith for Deadline, wrote that Escape from Mogadishu is an engrossing film, which reminded her of Ben Affleck's escape thriller Argo and 2005 French war film Joyeux Noël by Christian Carion. Smith liked the setting of scenes, characters and humor in the film and said, "Propelled by a naturally cinematic true story, the thriller blends action with humor and heart to crowd-pleasing effect."

Lee Jutton of Film Inquiry, calling the humor in the film "a huge asset", concluded the review as "With stellar performances from everyone involved, especially Kim and Heo as the rival ambassadors turned temporary allies, it's easy to become wholly engaged by a blockbuster like Escape from Mogadishu."

Carla Hay of Culture Mix, praised the performance of lead cast in the film writing, "All of the principal cast members give solid performances." She opined that the film had many heart throbbing, uncertain and unexpected situations taking film to climax. Carla concluded the review writing, "And it's a memorable depiction of what people will or will not do to hold on to patriotic allegiances when there are life-or-death decisions to be made."

James Marsh reviewing for South China Morning Post rated the film with 3 out of 5 stars and said, "Ryoo, who specialises in testosterone-fuelled action cinema, makes good use of his dusty, arid locations to accentuate the characters' overwhelming sense of peril and vulnerability."

Kang Shin-sung, whose novel was the basis for the film, said he was frustrated that the film "omitted how South Korea helped North Korea on humanitarian grounds".

== Awards and nominations ==
Year	Awards	Category	Recipient	Result	Ref.
2021	30th Buil Film Awards	Best Film	Escape from Mogadishu	Won	
2021	30th Buil Film Awards	Best Director	Ryoo Seung-wan	Nominated	
2021	30th Buil Film Awards	Best Actor	Kim Yoon-seok	Nominated	
2021	30th Buil Film Awards	Best Supporting Actor	Huh Joon-ho	Won	
2021	30th Buil Film Awards	Best Supporting Actor	Koo Kyo-hwan	Nominated	
2021	30th Buil Film Awards	Best Screenplay	Ryoo Seung-wan and Lee Ki-cheol	Won	
2021	30th Buil Film Awards	Best Cinematography Award	Choi Young-hwan	Won	
2021	30th Buil Film Awards	Best Music Award	Bang Jun-seok	Won	
2021	30th Buil Film Awards	Best Art/Technical Award	Kim Bo-mook (Production design)	Nominated	
2021	30th Buil Film Awards	Best Art/Technical Award	Yoon Dae-won (Martial arts)	Nominated	
2021	30th Buil Film Awards	Star of the Year Award	Zo In-sung	Won	
2021	42nd Blue Dragon Film Awards	Best Film	Escape from Mogadishu	Won	
2021	42nd Blue Dragon Film Awards	Best Director	Ryoo Seung-wan	Won	
2021	42nd Blue Dragon Film Awards	Best Actor	Kim Yoon-seok	Nominated	
2021	42nd Blue Dragon Film Awards	Best Actor	Zo In-sung	Nominated	
2021	42nd Blue Dragon Film Awards	Best Supporting Actor	Heo Jun-ho	Won	
2021	42nd Blue Dragon Film Awards	Best Supporting Actor	Koo Kyo-hwan	Nominated	
2021	42nd Blue Dragon Film Awards	Chung Jung-won Popular Star Award	Koo Kyo-hwan	Won	
2021	42nd Blue Dragon Film Awards	Best Screenplay	Ryoo Seung-wan and Lee Ki-cheol	Nominated	
2021	42nd Blue Dragon Film Awards	Best Lighting Award	Lee Jae-hyeok	Nominated	
2021	42nd Blue Dragon Film Awards	Best Editing Award	Lee Gang-hui	Nominated	
2021	42nd Blue Dragon Film Awards	Best Art Direction	Kim Bo-mook	Won	
2021	42nd Blue Dragon Film Awards	Best Music	Bang Jun-seok	Nominated	
2021	42nd Blue Dragon Film Awards	Technical Award	Special Effects	Nominated	
2021	42nd Blue Dragon Film Awards	Technical Award	Stunts	Nominated	
2021	42nd Blue Dragon Film Awards	Audience Choice Award for Most Popular Film	Escape from Mogadishu	Won	
2021	Korean Association of Film Critics Awards	Best Director	Ryoo Seung-wan	Won	
2021	Korean Association of Film Critics Awards	Best Supporting Actor	Huh Joon-ho	Won	
2021	Korean Association of Film Critics Awards	Best Music Award	Bang Jun-seok	Won	
2021	Korean Association of Film Critics Awards	Best Cinematography Award	Choi Young-hwan	Won	
2021	8th Korean Film Writers Association Awards	Best Film	Escape from Mogadishu	Won	
2021	8th Korean Film Writers Association Awards	Best Supporting Actor	Heo Jun-ho	Won	
2021	8th Korean Film Writers Association Awards	Best Cinematography and Lighting Award	Choi Young-hwan	Won	
2021	8th Korean Film Writers Association Awards	Best Art and Technology Award	Lee Jae-hyeok	Won	
2021	8th Korean Film Writers Association Awards	Best Art/Technical Award	Lee Hee-kyung, Kim Bo-mook (Special Effects)	Won	
2022	58th Baeksang Arts Awards	Grand Prize – Film	Ryoo Seung-wan	Won	
2022	58th Baeksang Arts Awards	Best Film	Escape from Mogadishu	Won	
2022	58th Baeksang Arts Awards	Best Director	Ryoo Seung-wan	Nominated	
2022	58th Baeksang Arts Awards	Best Actor	Kim Yoon-seok	Nominated	
2022	58th Baeksang Arts Awards	Best Supporting Actor	Huh Joon-ho	Nominated	
2022	58th Baeksang Arts Awards	Best Supporting Actor	Koo Kyo-hwan	Nominated	
2022	58th Baeksang Arts Awards	Best Supporting Actress	Kim So-jin	Nominated	
2022	58th Baeksang Arts Awards	Best Supporting Actress	Kim Jae-hwa	Nominated	
2022	58th Baeksang Arts Awards	Best Screenplay	Ryoo Seung-wan and Lee Ki-cheol	Nominated	
2022	58th Baeksang Arts Awards	Best Cinematography Award	Choi Young-hwan	Won	
2022	Fantasporto	Best Orient Express Film	Escape from Mogadishu	Won	
2022	Chunsa Film Art Awards 2022	Best Director	Ryoo Seung-wan	Nominated	
2022	Chunsa Film Art Awards 2022	Best Screenplay	Ryoo Seung-wan and Lee Gi-cheol	Nominated	
2022	Chunsa Film Art Awards 2022	Technical Award (Cinematography)	Choi Young-hwan	Won	
2022	Chunsa Film Art Awards 2022	Technical Award (Music)	Bang Jun-seok	Nominated	
2022	Chunsa Film Art Awards 2022	Best Actor	Kim Yoon-seok	Nominated	
2022	Chunsa Film Art Awards 2022	Best Supporting Actor	Huh Joon-ho	Nominated	
2022	Chunsa Film Art Awards 2022	Best Supporting Actor	Koo Kyo-hwan	Nominated	
2022	Chunsa Film Art Awards 2022	Best Supporting Actress	Kim So-jin	Nominated	

== See also ==
- List of submissions to the 94th Academy Awards for Best International Feature Film
- List of South Korean submissions for the Academy Award for Best International Feature Film
- Black Hawk Down (film)
- MALBATT: Misi Bakara
