= Hostage: Missing Celebrity =

2021 South Korean thriller film

- Theatrical release poster
- Hangul: 인질
- Hanja: 人質
- RR: Injil
- MR: Injil
- Directed by: Pil Gam-sung
- Screenplay by: Pil Gam-sung
- Based on: Saving Mr. Wu by Ding Sheng
- Produced by: Kang Hye-jung
- Starring: Hwang Jung-min
- Cinematography: Choi Young-hwan
- Edited by: Kim Chang-ju
- Music by: Choi Jung-in; Kim Tae-seong
- Production companies: Secret Warrior; Filmmaker R&K
- Distributed by: Next Entertainment World
- Release date: August 18, 2021
- Running time: 94 minutes
- Country: South Korea
- Language: Korean
- Budget: ₩8 billion
- Box office: US$13.1 million

Hostage: Missing Celebrity (Korean: 인질; RR: Injil) is a 2021 South Korean action thriller film, written and directed by Pil Gam-sung in his directional debut. It is based on the 2015 Chinese film Saving Mr. Wu. Starring Hwang Jung-min, the film follows the kidnapping of Korean top film star Hwang Jung-min, who initially believes it's a prank until he realizes the kidnappers are demanding a huge ransom within 24 hours. The film was scheduled for release in 2020 but it was postponed due to the COVID-19 pandemic.

Hostage: Missing Celebrity was theatrically released on August 18, 2021.

== Synopsis ==
After a film premiere, a famous actor is kidnapped in the middle of Seoul. Thinking it is a prank, the actor is relaxed, but when he faces cruelty, he realizes the gravity of the situation. He tries to find an escape route as kidnappers demand a huge ransom within 24 hours. Then the struggle begins, which is very different from what he has seen in films.

== Cast ==
- Hwang Jung-min as himself, a Korean top film star who is taken hostage by five people
- Kim Jae-beom as Choi Ki-wan
- Lee Yoo-mi as Ban So-yeon
- Ryu Kyung-soo as Yeom Dong-hun
- Jung Jae-won as Yong-Tae
- Lee Kyu-won as Go Young-rok
- Lee Ho-jung as Saet-byeol
- Baek Joo-hee as Detective Oh
- Park Sung-woong as 'Brother'

== Production ==
The film is a remake of the 2015 Chinese film Saving Mr. Wu. It is a reality action film in which actor Hwang Jung-min is playing himself. In a press conference, Hwang Jung-min said, "I think it would be easy to play myself, but it is rather difficult to reveal myself." He further said, "I think the audience enjoyed the situation where Hwang Jung-min and Hwang Jung-min coexist in a movie more realistically." The film was shot in idle area of the military base in Gandong-myeon, Hwacheon County, Donghae Police Station, and around Namsan-myeon and Sabuk-myeon in Chuncheon.

== Release ==
The film was released on August 18, 2021, on 1289 screens.

The film was officially invited to the US Fantastic Fest, a genre film festival held from 23 to September 30, 2021, in Austin, Texas, United States.

Hostage: Missing Celebrity was invited to 41st Hawaii International Film Festival in 'Spotlight on Korea' (Korean film sector) section. The festival was held in Hawaii, US, from November 4 to November 28, 2021. It has also been invited at 16th Paris Korean Film Festival, which will be held from October 26 to November 2. It was showcased in 'Evenement' section of the festival program. In April 2022 it was invited at the 24th edition of Far East Film Festival at Udine held from April 22 to 30 2022.

== Reception ==
=== Box office ===
According to the Korea Film Council's integrated computer network data, the film ranked number 1 at the Korean box office by recording 97,097 audience on its opening day. Maintaining its top position at Korean box office for the second third and fourth day, it recorded 1 million cumulative audiences on 10h day of its release, thereby becoming the 3rd Korean film of 2021 to cross 1 million mark.

As of December 22, 2021 it is at 3rd place among all the Korean films released in the year 2021, with gross of US$13.07 million and 1,638,437 admissions.

=== Critical response ===
Lee Yu-na reviewing the film for YTN praised the debutant director Phil Gam-seong for his apt handling of the film and Hwang Jung-min for his performance. Yu-na opened the review writing, "A film with a simple plot wins with Hwang Jung-min's unrivaled acting skills. In terms of completeness, it is a masterpiece that never lags behind among the tentpole films this summer." She opined that the film has 'heightened the reality' by portraying Hwang Jung-min's character as himself.

Kim Mi-hwa reviewing for Star News wrote that the film is from a new genre of 'reality action' setting where the main actor is acting himself. Praising the direction of Phil Gam-seong, she said, "Even though it is a feature film by a new director, it does not stop breathing and boasts a smooth flow." Praising the performance of Hwang Jung-min in reality action setting, Mi-hwa opined, "As Hwang Jung-min said, if you watch the movie, you will find yourself cheering for him." She concluded, "Just seeing the discovery of new actors is enough reason to watch Hostage: Missing Celebrity."

Kim Ji-won of Ten Asia opened the review writing, "The movie Hostage: Missing Celebrity took the reality of 'acting veteran Hwang Jung-min' as the setting of the movie. Realism and fiction are properly blended to bring out a high level of immersion." Ji-won praised the performance of new actors and opined that this ensemble as hostage-takers has added to the sublimity of the film. Analysing the depth of reality and fiction in the reality-action film, she wrote that narrative of the film was well ordered and Hwang Jung-min's acting kept the watchers engrossed in the film. She wrote, "It [the film] also has the virtues of an entertainment movie with unrefined realistic action scenes and quick control through appropriate screen transitions."

Park Jeong-seon of JTBC wrote that the reality-action of the film made it appealing and kept the audience engrossed. She gave credit of this to director Phil Gam-seong and opined, "The realistic direction of director also played a big part in this reality." She praised the performance of lead actor and the cast of new actors, as she wrote, "Although they are newcomers who are still unfamiliar with the screen, they each do their job well." Park opined that though the production cost of the film is just about 8 billion won, still "[..] the best possible content was created." Park concluded, "It is a wise film that is well suited to current theaters and audiences."

== Awards and nominations ==
Year	Awards	Category	Recipient	Result	Ref.
2021	42nd Blue Dragon Film Awards	Best Film	Hostage: Missing Celebrity	Nominated	
2021	42nd Blue Dragon Film Awards	New Actor	Ryu Kyung-soo	Nominated	
2021	42nd Blue Dragon Film Awards	New Actor	Kim Jae-beom	Nominated	
2021	42nd Blue Dragon Film Awards	New Director	Pil Gam-sung	Nominated	
2021	42nd Blue Dragon Film Awards	Best Editing	Kim Chang-ju	Nominated	
2021	8th Korean Film Writers Association Awards	Best New Actress	Lee Yoo-mi	Won	
2022	58th Baeksang Arts Awards	Best New Director	Pil Gam-sung	Nominated	
2022	58th Baeksang Arts Awards	Best New Actor	Kim Jae-beom	Nominated	
2022	Chunsa Film Art Awards 2022	Best New Director	Pil Gam-sung	Nominated	
2022	Chunsa Film Art Awards 2022	Best Actor	Hwang Jung-min	Nominated	
2022	Chunsa Film Art Awards 2022	Best New Actor	Kim Jae-beom	Nominated	
