= Lee Joon-hyuk =

Lee Joon-hyuk may refer to:

- Lee Jun-hyeok (actor, born 1972), South Korean actor
- Lee Joon-hyuk (actor, born 1984), South Korean actor
