= Hyun Bong-sik =

South Korean actor (born 1984)

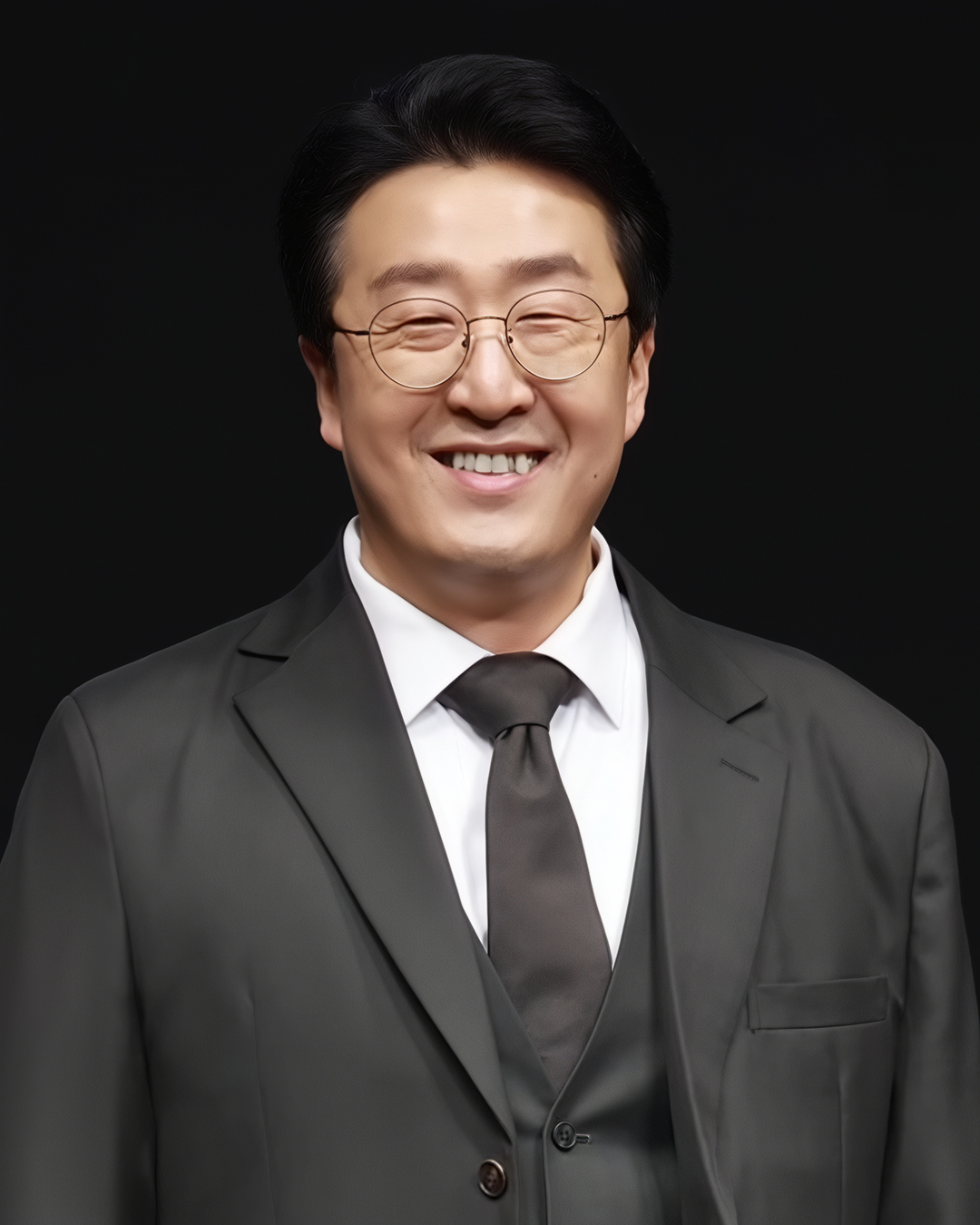
- Hyun in 2025
- Born: Hyun Jae-young; October 20, 1984 (age 42); Busan, South Korea
- Occupation: Actor
- Years active: 2014–present
- Agent: JERRY gogo

Korean name
- Hangul: 현봉식
- RR: Hyeon Bongsik
- MR: Hyŏn Pongsik
- Website: Official Website

Hyun Bong-sik (Korean: 현봉식; born Hyun Jae-young on October 20, 1984) is a South Korean actor.

== Filmography ==
=== Television series ===
Year	Title	Role	Notes
2016	The Na Cheong-ryeom Assemblyman Kidnapping Case	Director Yoon	
2016	Five Enough	Dae-pal	
2018	Switch	Doctor	
2018	The Ghost Detective	Deputy Shooter	
2018–2019	Clean with Passion for Now	Ha Eun-woo	
2019	Hell Is Other People	Ahn Hee-jong	
2020	Hyena	Kim Chang-uk	
2020	SF8: "Whispers of the Gods"	Chief Kang	
2021	Mouse	Bok Ho-nam	
2021	The Road: The Tragedy of One	SWAT Detective	
2021	D.P. 1	Cheon Yong-deok	
2021	The Veil	Cheon Myeong-gi	
2022	Juvenile Justice	Seo Won-sik	
2022	Again My Life	Park Dae-ho	
2022	Our Blues	Bank Customer	
2022	Narco-Saints	Park Eung-soo	
2022	One Dollar Lawyer	Hwang Geum-sik	
2022	Shadow Detective	Goo Dong-beom	
2022	Monstrous	Gunman	
2023	Queenmaker	Kang Moon-bok	
2023	Shadow Detective 2	Goo Dong-beom	
2023	O'PENing: Summer Cold	Drunkard	
2023	Destined With You	Kong Seo-gu	
2023	Sweet Home 2	Wang Ho-sang	
2023	Adamas	Il-ro	
2024	The Bequeathed	Kang Hong-sik	
2024	Doctor Slump	Kong Tae-sun	
2024	A Killer Paradox	Park Jung-jin	
2024	The Auditors	Kim Man-su	Special appearance
2024	Sweet Home 3	Wang Ho-sang	
2024	No Way Out: The Roulette	Lim Ji-hong	
2024	Dongjae, the Good or the Bastard	Jo Byeong-geon	
2024	Gangnam B-Side	Kim Jang-ho	
2025	Love Scout	Owner of the car mistakenly taken by Kang Ji-yoon	Special appearance
2025	The Witch	Detective	
2025	When Life Gives You Tangerines	Jeong Mi-in's Manager	Special appearance
2025	Nine Puzzles	Choi San	
2025	Aema	Heo Heok	
2025	God's Beads		
2025	Confidence Queen		
2025	Inside Man	Detective Mu	
2026	Mad Concrete Dreams	Oh Dong-gi	

=== Feature films ===
Year	Title	Role	Notes
2014	The Pirates	Ssang-su	
2014	Ode to My Father	Market Vendor	
2015	The Classified File	Detective Lee	
2016	Malice	Bong-sik	
2016	Asura: The City of Madness	Detective Kang	
2016	Analog Human	Kang Chang-gu	
2016	Derailed	Big Guy	
2017	The Discloser	Colonel Choi	
2017	Steel Rain	Black Market Man	
2017	One Line	Thief	
2017	The Sheriff in Town	Hotel Chief	
2017	Real	Chinese Restaurant Employee	
2017	V.I.P.	Detective Hyun	
2017	The Witness	Myung-hyun Cheol	
2017	The Preparation	Eun-chul	
2017	1987: When the Day Comes	Park Won-jun	
2018	Snatch Up	Drug Dealer	
2018	Love+Sling	Coach Seong-woong	
2018	Vanishing Time: A Boy Who Returned	Prison Guard	
2018	The Witch: Part 1. The Subversion	Middle-aged Man	
2018	The Great Battle	Restaurant Owner	
2019	Believer	Detective Kim	
2019	Tazza: One Eyed Jack	Bodyguard	
2019	By Quantum Physics: A Nightlife Venture	Kim Kwan-chul	
2019	Car Service	Moon Yong-sik	
2019	Heung-boo: The Revolutionist	Commander Baek-ho	
2021	Three Sisters	Sang-jun	
2021	Night in Paradise	Busan Man	
2021	Introduction	Bong-sik	
2021	Spiritwalker	Detective Park	
2021	Hunt	System Director	
2022	Emergency Declaration	Park Yoon-chul	
2022	Hansan: Rising Dragon	Lee Gwang	
2022	Hot Blooded	Baduk	
2022	When Spring Comes	Pil-seong	
2023	Soulmate	Uncle	
2023	12.12: The Day	Joo Wan-yong	
2023	Finder	Accessory Shop Owner	
2024	The Roundup: Punishment	President Kwon	
2024	The Assassin: ROOKIES	Captain	
2024	Pilot	Captain Noh	
2024	Victory	Choo Woo-yong	
2024	I, the Executioner	Detective Deok-chil	
2024	I Heard It Through the Grapevine	Lee In-cheol	
2024	Method Acting		
2025	The Match	Yong-gak	
2025	Lobby	Father Garcini	
2025	Hi-Five	Doctor	
2025	Good News	General Choi	
2025	Audition 109		

=== Short films ===
Year	Title	Role	Notes
2013	Paki	Director	
2016	The Hunt	Dae-jun	
2016	The Guest	Chun-sik	
2016	Honggeo	Executive Hyun	
2017	Comprehensive Insurance	Chang-soo	
2017	Alone	Police Officer	
2017	Selection	Claw Machine Owner	
2017	Silver Lining	Owner	
2018	Mr. Park	Hong-wan	
2018	Drifting		
2018	For Elise	Taekwondo Gym Owner	
2019	Ryeong-hee	Owner	
2019	Promising	Swim Coach	
2020	Run! Courier	Narrator	
2021	In October	Joon-ho	
2021	Hollywood Kid	Father	

=== Music videos ===
Year	Release date	Artist	Song	Notes
2022	November 18	Bibi	"Vengeance"	

== Awards and nominations ==
Year	Ceremony	Award	Work	Result
2024	44th Korean Association of Film Critics Awards	Best Supporting Actor	Fighting Girls	Won
2025	61st Baeksang Arts Awards	Best Supporting Actor – Television	Good and Bad Tong Jae	Nominated
