= Love Scout =

2025 South Korean television series

- Promotional poster
- Hangul: 나의 완벽한 비서
- Hanja: 나의 完璧한 祕書
- Lit.: My Perfect Secretary
- RR: Naui wanbyeokhan biseo
- MR: Naŭi wanbyŏkhan pisŏ
- Genre: Romance drama; Workplace
- Written by: Ji Eun
- Directed by: Ham Joon-ho; Kim Jae-hong
- Starring: Han Ji-min; Lee Joon-hyuk; Kim Do-hoon; Kim Yoon-hye
- Music by: Lim Ha-young
- Opening theme: "Test Me" by Paul Blanco
- Country of origin: South Korea
- Original language: Korean
- No. of episodes: 12 + 2 special

Production
- Executive producers: Hong Sung-chang; Oh Eun-young; Lee Ok-gyu (CP)
- Producers: Kim Joon-kyung; Yoon Geon-hee; Yoon Ki-jin
- Cinematography: Oh Jae-ho; Kim Joon-hee; Jung Ha-cheol; Lee Jun-beom
- Editors: Gu Hee-jung; Joo In-kyung
- Production companies: Studio S; EO Contents Group

Original release
- Network: SBS TV
- Release: January 3 – February 14, 2025

Love Scout (Korean: 나의 완벽한 비서) is a 2025 South Korean romance drama workplace television series written by Ji Eun, co-directed by Ham Joon-ho and Kim Jae-hong, and starring Han Ji-min and Lee Joon-hyuk. The series is about the romance between the CEO and secretary. It aired on SBS TV from January 3, to February 14, 2025, every Friday and Saturday at 22:00 (KST). It is also available for streaming on Wavve in South Korea, and on Netflix and Viki in selected regions.

== Synopsis ==
Kang Ji-yoon is a successful and ambitious woman who serves as the CEO of the headhunting company Peoplez. Ji-yoon is totally committed to her work and does a great job, but finds it difficult to balance her personal and professional lives. She surprisingly meets Yoo Eun-ho, a competent and skilled secretary who is also a single father. Ji-yoon finds Eun-ho impressive not only for his professional skills but also for his ability to manage work and family life with ease.

Working together, Ji-yoon and Eun-ho start to form a special and endearing bond. Eun-ho begins teaching Ji-yoon important life lessons, including the value of human connection, work-life balance, and life in general. Their business partnership eventually develops into a romantic relationship as Eun-ho is drawn to Ji-yoon's drive and commitment.

== Cast and characters ==
=== Main ===
- Han Ji-min as Kang Ji-yoon

CEO of Peoplez, the number two search firm in the industry.

- Lee Joon-hyuk as Yu Eun-ho

Ji-yun's assistant who is a single father.

- Kim Do-hoon as Woo Jung-hoon

CTO of Peoplez who is the youngest son of a chaebol family.

- Kim Yoon-hye as Jung Soo-hyun

A picture book writer who is a single mom and Eun-ho's parenting comrade.

=== Supporting ===
==== Peoplez ====
- Lee Sang-hee as Seo Mi-ae

CFO of Peoplez and Ji-yun's only close friend.

- Heo Dong-won as Kim Young-soo

A manager-level consultant at Peoplez.

- Yoon Ga-i as Na Gyu-rim

An assistant manager-level consultant at Peoplez.

- Seo Hye-won as Oh Kyung-hwa

A consultant at Peoplez.

- Go Geon-han as Lee Kwang-hee

A rookie consultant at Peoplez.

- Cho Han-jun as Go Jeong-nam

A headhunter at Peoplez specialized in logistics but is fired.

==== Others ====
- Park Bo-kyung as Kim Hye-jin

CEO of Career Way, the number one search firm in the industry. Ji-yoon's rival and former mentor.

- Gi So-you as Yu Byeol

Eun-ho's daughter.

- Kim Tae-bin as Jung Seo-joon

Soo-hyun's son.

- Lee Jae-woo as Lee Kang-seok

Owner of Dodam Book Store who is Mi-ae's husband and Eun-ho's senior.

- Song Ji-in as Park Sung-kyung

Director of Sky Kindergarten and Jung-hoon's sister-in-law.

- Yoon Yoo-sun as Lee Jeong-sun

Soo-hyun's mom.

- Cho Seung-yun as Woo Chul-yong

Chairman of Woomyung Group and Jung-hoon's father.

- Kang Gil-woo as Kim Dong-ki

An employee at Hansu Electronics' HR team.

=== Special appearances ===
- Lee Hee-joon as Peter Kwon

The head designer of Genus Motors, a racing team.

- Hyun Bong-sik as the owner of a car that Ji-yoon mistakenly ride
- Nam Myeong-ryeol as the Chairman of Serim Group
- Heo Jun-seok as Han Jeong-won

Head chef at Bello Buono who is sought by Hotel Ganiel.

- Park Yu-rim as Yu Hye-in

A sous-chef under Jeong-won at Bello Buono.

- Lee Doo-seok as Jin Sung-ho

CEO of Deluxe Line, an online luxury brand platform.

- Kim Jung-young as Cho Young-sook

An expert in luxury brand repair with 37 years of experience.

== Production ==
=== Development ===
Love Scout was developed under the working title Greeting Relationship (인사하는 사이; Insahaneun sai), is written by Ji Eun, co-directed by Ham Joon-ho and Kim Jae-hong. It is produced by Studio S and EO Contents Group.

=== Casting ===
Lee Joon-hyuk and Han Ji-min were cast as the lead actors and positively considering to appear in August 2023, and they were officially confirmed in November 2023.

=== Filming ===
Principal photography began on March 7, 2024.

== Release ==
Love Scout was originally part of SBS' 2024 drama lineup under its working title. Later, the series was confirmed to premiere on January 3, 2025, after SBS released the teaser poster in November 2024. It would be broadcast on SBS TV's Friday and Saturday timeslot at 22:00 (KST). It was also confirmed to be available for streaming on Wavve in South Korea, and on Netflix and Viki in selected regions.

== Original soundtrack ==
The soundtrack of the series, led by music director Lim Ha-young and featuring artists Minnie, Paul Blanco, Mrch, Paul Kim, Sam Kim, Kwon Jin-ah, Hiko, and Jin Hyo-jung were revealed by SBS on January 2, 2025.

=== Album ===
Love Scout (Original Soundtrack) - All Track

Soundtrack album by Various artists
- Released: February 14, 2025
- Length: 100:30
- Language: Korean
- Labels: Studio S, Dreamus

Singles from Love Scout
- 1. "Always Be With You" Released: January 2, 2025; 2. "Test Me" Released: January 4, 2025; 3. "How you Feelin'" Released: January 10, 2025; 4. "Like a Moonlight" Released: January 11, 2025; 5. "More and More" Released: January 17, 2025; 6. "Run to You" Released: January 18, 2025; 7. "Like a Moonlight" Released: January 24, 2025; 8. "Answer" Released: January 25, 2025

The soundtrack album of Love Scout was released on February 14, 2025 by Studio S and distributed by Dreamus, containing all of the singles and background tracks.

==== Track listing ====
Love Scout track listing
No.	Title	Lyrics	Music	Artist	Length
1.	"Test Me"	Pollen; Lavin	Pollen; Lavin	Paul Blanco	3:31
2.	"Always Be With You" (내가 널 지켜줄게)	Lee Ki-hwan; More (Kiple)	Lee Ki-hwan; More (Kiple)	Paul Kim	4:11
3.	"How You Feelin'?"	Kim Beom-ju; Kim Si-hyuk	Kim Beom-ju; Kim Si-hyuk	Kwon Jin-ah	3:44
4.	"Like a Moonlight"	Lee Dong-wook (Sentiano)	Lee Dong-wook (Sentiano)	Sam Kim	3:47
5.	"More and More"	Heeyeon; Leeseon; Wooh!	Heeyeon; Leeseon	Mrch	3:19
6.	"Run to You"	Lee Ki-hwan; More (Kiple); Moonssi (Kiple)	Lee Ki-hwan; More (Kiple); Moonssi (Kiple)	Hiko	4:01
7.	"Like a Moonlight"	Lee Dong-wook (Sentiano)	Lee Dong-wook (Sentiano)	Jin Hyo-jeong	3:50
8.	"Answer"	Lee Hae-in; Jasmine	Lee Hae-in	Minnie ((G)I-dle)	3:45
9.	"Head Hunter" (헤드헌터)		Lim Ha-young		1:33
10.	"Woops" (어이쿠!)		Park Suk-won; Joo Ji-hoon; Kim Seong-jong		2:25
11.	"Casting" (섭외작전)		Kim Wan-jung		2:06
12.	"Hurry Up" (빨리빨리)		Koo Ji-hyung		1:37
13.	"Successful"		Shin Min-yong		2:43
14.	"Persuade" (설득)		Lim Ha-young		1:43
15.	"Interrupt" (방해작전)		Kim Yeon-joo		3:04
16.	"Office Love"		Jin Myeong-yong		3:07
17.	"Good People" (좋은 사람들)		Park Suk-won; Ju Ji-hoon; Yoon Song		2:58
18.	"Monkey Boy" (장난꾸러기)		Noh Yu-seok		2:38
19.	"Eastern Man" (잘생긴 게 죄)		Lim Ha-young		0:48
20.	"Run to You" (그의 손길이 닿은)		Yoon June-hyuk		2:46
21.	"Let's Go Party" (너를 위한 파티)		Lee Hyun-joo		3:17
22.	"Handsome Guy" (미남)		Park Ji-hoon		1:31
23.	"Falling in Love" (사랑이 밀려올 때)		Shin Min-yong		3:45
24.	"Little Romance" (설레는 발걸음)		Jo Yu-jin		1:49
25.	"Secret Love" (베란다 연애)		Park Ji-hoon		1:37
26.	"Interesting" (자꾸 눈이 가는 사람)		Byun Dong-wook		1:55
27.	"Charm" (은근한 매력)		Yoo Jong-hyun		2:12
28.	"Sunshine in My Heart" (두근대는 내 마음)		Jeong Bong-gil		2:40
29.	"My Dad" (그리운 사람)		Jin Myeong-yong		2:56
30.	"Hello" (안녕의 웃음)		Yu Tae-sung		1:48
31.	"Beautiful Day" (예쁜 옷을 입고)		Park Suk-won; Ju Gi-hoon		3:05
32.	"Happy Smile" (웃고있는 너)		Koo Ji-hyung		2:03
33.	"Spring Time" (봄날)		Shin Min-yong		3:36
34.	"Like a Fool" (엉성한 작전)		Byun Dong-wook		1:34
35.	"Smile Baby" (해맑은 별)		Lim Ha-young		0:25
36.	"The Solace" (위안)		Noh Yu-seok		2:22
37.	"The Grief" (운명일까)		Lim Ha-young		2:52
38.	"Meet Again" (재회)		Jin Myeong-yong		3:27
Total length:					100:30

== Viewership ==
Love Scout : South Korea viewers per episode (millions)

Season	Episode number												Average
Season	1	2	3	4	5	6	7	8	9	10	11	12	Average
1	1.015	1.214	1.889	2.220	2.008	2.202	2.102	2.150	2.279	2.078	2.183	2.199	1.962

Source: Audience measurement performed nationwide by Nielsen Korea.

Average TV viewership ratings
Ep.	Original broadcast date	Average audience share (Nielsen Korea)	
Ep.	Original broadcast date	Nationwide	Seoul
1	January 3, 2025	5.2% (10th)	4.9% (9th)
2	January 4, 2025	6.5% (6th)	6.7% (4th)
3	January 10, 2025	10.5% (3rd)	10.3% (2nd)
4	January 11, 2025	11.3% (2nd)	11.3% (2nd)
5	January 17, 2025	10.7% (3rd)	10.9% (2nd)
6	January 18, 2025	11.4% (2nd)	11.2% (2nd)
7	January 24, 2025	11.0% (2nd)	10.5% (2nd)
8	January 25, 2025	10.9% (2nd)	10.6% (2nd)
9	February 1, 2025	11.8% (2nd)	11.8% (2nd)
10	February 7, 2025	10.9% (3rd)	10.7% (2nd)
11	February 8, 2025	11.7% (2nd)	11.6% (2nd)
12	February 14, 2025	12.0% (2nd)	11.3% (2nd)
Average		10.3%	10.2%
Special 1	December 30, 2024	2.2% (20th)	N/A
Special 2	January 31, 2025	3.9% (18th)	3.9% (19th)
In the table above, the blue numbers represent the lowest ratings and the red numbers represent the highest ratings.; N/A denotes ratings that were not published.

== Accolades ==
=== Awards and nominations ===
Awards and nominations
Award ceremony	Year	Category	Recipient(s)	Result	Ref.
New York Television Festival International TV & Films Awards	2026	Entertainment Program: Drama	Love Scout	Shortlisted	
