= Times (TV series) =

2021 South Korean television series

- Promotional poster
- Hangul: 타임즈
- RR: Taimjeu
- MR: T'aimjŭ
- Genre: Crime; Science fiction
- Created by: Studio Dragon; OCN
- Written by: Lee Sae-bom; Ahn Hye-jin
- Directed by: Yoon Jong-ho
- Starring: Lee Seo-jin; Lee Joo-young; Kim Yeong-cheol; Moon Jeong-hee
- Composers: Music Director; Eom Ki-yeop
- Country of origin: South Korea
- Original language: Korean
- No. of episodes: 12

Production
- Executive producer: Yoo Sang Woo
- Producers: Ahn Chang-hyun; Kang Bo-young; Chang Shin-ae; Kim kyo Reh
- Running time: 60 minutes
- Production company: Story Hunter Production

Original release
- Network: OCN
- Release: February 20 – March 28, 2021

Times (Korean: 타임즈) is a 2021 South Korean television series starring Lee Seo-jin, Lee Joo-young, Kim Yeong-cheol and Moon Jeong-hee. It aired on OCN from February 20 to March 28, 2021.

== Synopsis ==
Lee Jin-woo (Lee Seo-jin) and Seo Jung-in (Lee Joo-young) are both reporters, though the former lives in 2015 and the latter in 2020. One day, they discover that they can contact each other through a phone call. They start working together in order to prevent the murder of Jung-in's father Seo Gi-tae (Kim Yeong-cheol), the President of South Korea.

== Cast ==
=== Main ===
- Lee Seo-jin as Lee Jin-woo
- Lee Joo-young as Seo Jung-in
- Kim Yeong-cheol as Seo Gi-tae
- Moon Jeong-hee as Kim Young-joo

=== Supporting ===
- Kim In-kwon as Do Young-jae
- Moon Ji-in as Myung Soo-kyung
- Jung Sung-il as Kang Sin-wook
- Ha Jun as Lee Geun-woo
- Yu Sung-ju as Nam Sung-bum
- Shim Hyung-tak as Han Do-kyung
- Heo Jae-ho as Yoon Sung-ho
- Bae Hyun-kyung as Oh Jung-sik
- Song Young-chang as Baek Gyu-min
- Park Ye-ni as Song Min-joo
- Lim Soo-hyun as Jung Yu-mi
- Bae Woo-hee as Jo Yoo-jin (cameo, ep. 3-4)

== Production ==
Lee Seo-jin and Kim Yeong-cheol previously starred in Wonderful Days (2014).

== Original soundtrack ==
Times OST

Soundtrack album by Various artists
- Released: 2021
- Genre: Soundtrack
- Languages: Korean; English
- Label: VLENDING

=== Part 1 ===
Released on February 20, 2021
No.	Title	Lyrics	Music	Artist	Length
1.	"Away"	Kim Beom-joo; Kim Shi-hyuk	Kim Beom-joo; Kim Shi-hyuk	Sondia	4:35
2.	"Away" (Inst.)		Kim Beom-joo; Kim Shi-hyuk		4:35
Total length:					9:10

=== Part 2 ===
Released on February 27, 2021
No.	Title	Lyrics	Music	Artist	Length
1.	"The Visitor (feat. KLAZY)"	Taibian	Taibian; Kim Jung-woo (TOXIC)	Isaac Hong	3:32
2.	"The Visitor (feat. KLAZY)" (Inst.)		Taibian; Kim Jung-woo (TOXIC)		3:32
Total length:					7:04

=== Part 3 ===
Released on March 6, 2021
No.	Title	Lyrics	Music	Artist	Length
1.	"The Mirror"	Taibian	Taibian; Kim Jung-woo (TOXIC)	Jang Hye-jin	3:36
2.	"The Mirror" (Inst.)		Taibian; Kim Jung-woo (TOXIC)		3:36
Total length:					7:12

== Viewership ==
Times : South Korea viewers per episode (thousands)

Season	Episode number												Average
Season	1	2	3	4	5	6	7	8	9	10	11	12	Average
1	N/A	696	N/A	648	N/A	550	N/A	494	N/A	624	N/A	733	N/A

Source: Audience measurement performed nationwide by Nielsen Korea. (Note: Due to some ratings not recorded, the exact average rating is unknown.)

Average TV viewership ratings
Ep.	Original broadcast date	Average audience share (Nielsen Korea)	
Ep.	Original broadcast date	Nationwide	Seoul
1	February 20, 2021	1.576%	1.909%
2	February 21, 2021	2.709%	2.473%
3	February 27, 2021	1.624%	—N/a
4	February 28, 2021	2.844%	3.140%
5	March 6, 2021	1.615%	—N/a
6	March 7, 2021	2.420%	2.096%
7	March 13, 2021	1.500%	—N/a
8	March 14, 2021	2.301%	2.194%
9	March 20, 2021	1.400%	—N/a
10	March 21, 2021	2.801%	2.461%
11	March 27, 2021	1.400%	—N/a
12	March 28, 2021	3.079%	3.019%
Average		2.106%	—
The blue numbers represent the lowest ratings and the red numbers represent the highest ratings.; N/A denotes that the rating is not known.; This drama airs on a cable channel/pay TV which normally has a relatively smaller audience compared to free-to-air TV/public broadcasters (KBS, SBS, MBC and EBS).

== Awards and nominations ==
Year	Award	Category	Recipient	Result	Ref.
2021	57th Baeksang Arts Awards	Best New Actress (TV)	Lee Joo-young	Nominated	
