= Baseball Girl =

2020 South Korean drama sports film

- Theatrical release poster
- Hangul: 야구소녀
- RR: Yagu sonyeo
- MR: Yagu sonyŏ
- Directed by: Choi Yoon-tae
- Written by: Choi Yoon-tae
- Produced by: On Jung-joon
- Starring: Lee Joo-young; Lee Joon-hyuk; Yeom Hye-ran; Song Young-kyu; Kwak Dong-yeon
- Cinematography: Hwang Seung-yoon
- Edited by: Choi Yoon-tae
- Music by: Peterpen Complex
- Production company: Korean Academy of Film Arts
- Distributed by: M-Line Distribution
- Release dates: October 4, 2019 (BIFF); June 18, 2020 (South Korea)
- Running time: 105 minutes
- Country: South Korea
- Language: Korean

Baseball Girl (Korean: 야구소녀; RR: Yagu sonyeo) is a 2019 South Korean drama sports film written and directed by Choi Yoon-tae, starring Lee Joo-young, Lee Joon-hyuk, Yeom Hye-ran, Song Young-kyu and Kwak Dong-yeon. It was released in theaters on June 18, 2020.

The film had its world premiere at the 24th Busan International Film Festival on October 4, 2019, in the "Korean Cinema Today - Panorama" category.

== Plot ==
The story of Joo Soo-in who is determined to become the first female baseball player to join a professional team.

== Cast ==
- Lee Joo-young as Joo Soo-in
- Lee Joon-hyuk as Choi Jin-tae
- Yeom Hye-ran as Shin Hae-sook
- Song Young-kyu as Soo-in's father
- Kwak Dong-yeon as Lee Jung-ho
- Joo Hae-eun as Han Bang-geul
- Lee Chae-eun as Teacher Kim
- Kim Jong-soo as Coach Park
- Yoo Jae-myung as Head

== Production ==
=== Development ===
Choi Yoon-tae was inspired to write this film in 2017 after he watched the interview of a female baseball player. He added that "when [he] told [his] wife that there is no current rule banning women from playing on a professional baseball team, she seemed surprised; so [he] thought it would be interesting to write a story on an aspiring female baseball player."

=== Casting ===
On November 16, 2018, Lee Joo-young was cast as the protagonist of Baseball Girl. On November 20, Lee Joon-hyuk's agency confirmed that the actor would be starring in the film, playing a high school baseball coach who helps Joo Soo-in achieve her dream. On November 28, Yeom Hye-ran joined the main cast in the role of Soo-in's mother. Kwak Dong-yeon was confirmed on January 4, 2019, for the role of a high school baseball player, followed by Lee Chae-eun on January 15 for the role of Soo-in's Japanese teacher.

=== Filming ===
Principal photography began in January 2019 and filming ended in February, a period during which baseball players usually cannot train due to the cold weather, which made filming more difficult in addition to the small budget.

== Release ==
Baseball Girl premiered at the 24th Busan International Film Festival on October 4, 2019, in the presence of director Choi Yoon-tae and actors Lee Joo-young, Lee Joon-hyuk and Yeom Hye-ran. GV screenings took place on October 4 and 5 at Lotte Cinema Centum City and a general screening was held on October 9 at Lotte Cinema Daeyoung. Tickets were sold out soon after they went on sale for both screenings.

The film hit theaters on June 18, 2020.

== Reception ==
=== Critical response ===
At the Busan International Film Festival, the media, critics and audience praised Lee Joo-young's acting as well as Soo-in's passion, her determination to keep running towards her dream and not giving up despite prejudice against her gender.

=== Accolades ===
| Year | Award | Category | Recipient(s) | Result | Ref. |
|---|---|---|---|---|---|
| 2019 | 45th Seoul Independent Film Festival | Independent Star Award | Lee Joo-young | Won | |
| 2020 | 29th Buil Film Awards | Best Actress | Lee Joo-young | Nominated | |
| 2020 | 41st Blue Dragon Film Awards | Best New Actress | Lee Joo-young | Nominated | |

== See also ==
- List of baseball films
