= Mouse (TV series) =

2021 South Korean thriller TV series

- Promotional poster
- Hangul: 마우스
- RR: Mauseu
- MR: Mausŭ
- Genre: Crime thriller; Suspense; Mystery; Sci-Fi
- Written by: Choi Ran
- Directed by: Choi Joon-bae; Kang Cheol-woo
- Starring: Lee Seung-gi; Lee Hee-joon; Park Ju-hyun; Kyung Soo-jin
- Composer: Park Se-joon
- Country of origin: South Korea
- Original language: Korean
- No. of episodes: 20

Production
- Executive producers: Lee Kyung-sun; Hong Seung Cheol; Shin Young Jin
- Producers: Jeong Hoe-seok; Nam Gun-jung; Lee Hyun-young
- Camera setup: Single-camera
- Running time: 70 minutes
- Production companies: HIGROUND; Studio Invictus

Original release
- Network: tvN
- Release: March 3 – May 20, 2021

Mouse (Korean: 마우스) is a South Korean television series starring Lee Hee-joon, Lee Seung-gi, Park Ju-hyun, and Kyung Soo-jin. Directed by Choi Joon-bae and Kang Cheol-woo and written by Choi Ran, the story follows detective Go Mu-Chi (Lee Hee-joon) as he works alongside rookie officer Jeong Ba-reum (Lee Seung-gi) to hunt a serial killer.

The series aired on tvN on Wednesdays and Thursdays from March 3 to May 20, 2021. It was ranked 3rd hottest drama for the first half of 2021 based on KT's online video service (OTT) Seezn, and ranked 5th in tvN's all-time Wednesday and Thursday series (based on a paid platform integrated with cable, IPTV, and satellite/provided by Nielsen Korea).

== Background ==
Screenwriter Choi Ran was inspired by an elementary school murder case that occurred in Incheon, South Korea, in 2017. During the murder trial, when asked about the most difficult thing the defendant is facing right now, the defendant responded, "The weather is nice, but it's the hardest for me not to see cherry blossoms." Seeing that the murderer felt no remorse or guilt, Ran developed the drama against this backdrop, as he wanted to see 'psychopath murderers feel the pain, reflect on their actions, and atone. Even if there's only a slight chance that they will feel empathy, they should understand their sins sincerely and feel remorse. That would be the best punishment and salvation for the psychopathic murderers.'

== Synopsis ==
The story follows detective Ko Moo-chi (Lee Hee-joon)'s attempt to catch a psychopathic serial killer, after witnessing a horrific incident as a child and dealing with his demons from the trauma. Along with his rookie partner Jeong Ba-reum (Lee Seung-gi), he attempts to unearth the truth behind psychopathic behaviors and find answers about the genetic predispositions towards psychopathy — and how one might act on the knowledge in the event that such predispositions could be detected.

== Cast ==
=== Main ===
- Lee Seung-gi as Jeong Ba-reum, a rookie police officer whose life changes after a confrontation with a psychopathic serial killer.
- Lee Hee-joon as Ko Moo-chi, a detective who is willing to bend the rules to catch criminals.
  - Song Min-jae as young Ko Moo-chi
  - Suh Dong-hyun as teen Ko Moo-chi
- Park Ju-hyun as Oh Bong-yi, a confident and tough high school senior who lives with her grandmother and practices martial arts daily.
- Kyung Soo-jin as Choi Hong-ju, a talented production director of a reality TV program known as "Sherlock Hong-ju" at channel OBN.

=== People around Jeong Ba-reum ===
==== Ba-reum's friends ====
- Lee Seo-jun as Na Chi-guk, a new prison guard at Mujin Detention Center. He is best friends with Ba-reum since high school.
- Woo Ji-hyun as Gu Dong-gu, a prison guard and Ba-reum and Chi Kook's friend. He was in the same class with Ba-reum and Chi-guk at a private academy.

=== People around Ko Moo-chi ===
- Kim Young-jae as Ko Moo-won, Moo-chi's elder brother. He is a priest temporarily housed in the basement of a church. When he was young, he was saved from being killed by a serial killer, but has become disabled since. He is isolated from his younger brother Ko Moo-chi.
  - Jo Yeon-ho as young Ko Moo-won

=== People around Oh Bong-yi ===
- Kim Young-ok as Kim Gat-nam, Bong-yi's grandmother

=== Police Station ===
- Pyo Ji-hoon as Shin Sang, a freshman detective working under detective Go Moo-chi
- Ahn Nae-sang as Park Du-seok, head of the Military Manpower Administration Evidence Storage Team and former successful homicide detective
- Hyun Bong-sik as Bok Ho-nam, leader of the Mujin Bokbu Police Station Violent Team
- Yoon Seo-hyun as Gang Gi-hyeok, a detective inspector and former colleague of Moo-chi
- Kim Min-soo as Lee Min-soo, a detective
- Jeong Seok-yong as Woo Jae-pil, Du-seok's former partner

=== Others ===
- Ahn Jae-wook as Dr. Han Seo-joon, a genius neurosurgeon doctor at Guryong Hospital
- Kim Jung-nan as Sung Ji-eun, Dr. Han's wife
- Kwon Hwa-woon as Sung Yo-han, an emergency medical resident at Mujin Hospital. He is the youngest doctor in Korea to pass the state examination.
- Jo Jae-yoon as Daniel Lee, a doctor of genetics and a criminologist
- Jung Eun-pyo as Kang Deok-soo, a child sex offender
- Song Jae-hee as Woo Hyung-chul, Jae-pil's son and a lawyer
- Yoo Yeon as Hyung-chul's mother
- Ha Young as Song Soo-jung
- Kim Kang-hoon as Jae-hoon
  - Seo Woo-jin as younger Jae-hoon, a mysterious child born in 1995 whose family is murdered one day making him a key suspect in the case
- Son Woo-hyeon as Kim Joon-seong, Yo-han's classmate and friend
- Jung Ae-ri as Choi Young-shin, a corrupt Secretary General in the Blue House who voted in favor of the Kill Psychopath Fetus Bill in 1995
- Kim Ha-eon as Kim Hankok, a kidnapped kid
- Cherish Maningat as Hankook's mother
- Go Woo-ri as Jennifer Lee, Daniel Lee's sister and Han's former girlfriend
- Kang Mal-geum as Ba Reum's aunt
- Cheon Jeong-ha as Chi-guk's mother. This was the last drama role portrayed by Cheon before her death in 2021.
- Jin Seo-yeon
- Ma Dong-seok
- Kim Yo-han as a brain transplant patient (episode 20)

== Production ==
In April 2020, Lee Seung-gi and Choi Jin-hyuk were offered to star in the series. In June, Lee Seung-gi was confirmed to play a rookie police officer. On October 29, reports revealed that rapper P.O would star in the drama after he was spotted attending the script reading. A rep from the network later confirmed his appearance.

== Release ==
On July 1, 2021, Series Mania, an international festival dedicated to television series from around the world, announced the line-up for its 2021 Program taking place in Lille, France, between August 26 to September 2, 2021. The line-up included Mouse, where it will have its first French premiere in the international panorama category to be chaired by Florence Aubenas. On July 28, 2021, it was announced that Mouse will be included in the "2021 K-format Virtual Screenings in the US" held by KOCCA.

== Original soundtrack ==
Mouse OST

Soundtrack album by Various artists
- Released: 2021
- Genre: Soundtrack
- Languages: Korean; English
- Labels: VLENDING; Snow Entertainment

=== Part 1 ===
Released on March 11, 2021
No.	Title	Lyrics	Music	Artist	Length
1.	"It's Okay" (괜찮아)	bigguyrobin; KT Snow	bigguyrobin; KT Snow	Sojung (Ladies' Code)	3:26
2.	"It's Okay" (inst.)		bigguyrobin; KT Snow		3:26
Total length:					6:52

=== Part 2 ===
Released on March 17, 2021
No.	Title	Lyrics	Music	Artist	Length
1.	"Too Late"	Jung Bom; Seol Ki-tae	Seol Ki-tae	Horim	2:57
2.	"Too Late" (inst.)		Seol Ki-tae		2:57
Total length:					5:54

=== Part 3 ===
Released on April 1, 2021
No.	Title	Lyrics	Music	Artist	Length
1.	"A Rat In The Trap" (독 안에 든 쥐)	Giriboy	Giriboy; Minit; vibin	Giriboy	3:31
2.	"A Rat In The Trap" (inst.)		Giriboy; Minit; vibin		3:31
Total length:					7:02

=== Part 4 ===
Released on April 14, 2021
No.	Title	Lyrics	Music	Artist	Length
1.	"Duality"	Lee Ji-heon; TOP SNOW	Seol Ki-tae	Lee In	3:23
2.	"Duality" (inst.)		Seol Ki-tae		3:23
Total length:					6:46

=== Part 5 ===
Released on April 28, 2021
No.	Title	Lyrics	Music	Artist	Length
1.	"Twice"	Seol Ki-tae; Jo Hwan-hee; Marvin	Seol Ki-tae; Jo Hwan-hee	Marvin	3:20
2.	"Twice" (inst.)		Seol Ki-tae; Jo Hwan-hee		3:20
Total length:					6:40

=== Part 6 ===
Released on May 5, 2021
No.	Title	Lyrics	Music	Artist	Length
1.	"Steal Heart"	Jung Bom; Seol Ki-tae	Seol Ki-tae	Changha	3:10
2.	"Steal Heart" (inst.)		Seol Ki-tae		3:10
Total length:					6:20

=== Part 7 ===
Released on May 13, 2021
No.	Title	Length
1.	"Mouse"	2:24
2.	"Counselor"	1:42
3.	"Cardiac Arrest"	1:32
4.	"An Unpleasant Sound"	2:44
5.	"Blood Taste"	2:50
6.	"Illuminati"	2:18
7.	"Imagine What Happened"	3:58
8.	"Black and White City"	3:02
9.	"Emotionless"	2:26
10.	"Echo of Anger"	2:49
11.	"Only Head"	2:06
12.	"Predator Smile"	2:50
13.	"I Saw The Devil"	2:37
14.	"Find You"	2:52
15.	"Laboratory Mice"	2:46
16.	"Lord of Evil"	2:18
17.	"A Button is Missing"	3:25
18.	"Unsanctioned Case"	3:43
19.	"Painless"	2:05
20.	"Brooch"	2:39
21.	"Drinking Investigation"	1:26
22.	"Memories of Murder"	3:42
23.	"Under The Cross"	2:15
24.	"Storage Of Evidence"	2:12
25.	"Little Bird"	4:07
26.	"The Wanderer"	2:01
27.	"Multiple Personality"	3:52
28.	"Eternal Evil"	3:27
29.	"Whispers"	2:34
30.	"I Want To Know Why He Died"	2:22
31.	"Snakes In Suits"	2:54
32.	"Fierce"	1:31
33.	"Premeditated Murder"	3:09
34.	"Sorrow Ending"	3:06
35.	"Pictures Of The Basement"	3:00
36.	"Cold Tears"	2:43
37.	"Unforgettable Vacation"	2:54
38.	"Head Hunter"	1:43
39.	"The Sound Of Breath Coming"	1:45
40.	"A Proper Life"	1:43
Total length:		1:35:51

== Reception ==
=== Audience viewership ===
The drama broke the record for the highest viewership ratings among all tvN's Wed-Thur dramas in more than two years. It also placed 1st in its time slot across all channels among the 20-49 age demographic. The finale's real-time online viewership rate of TVING on the Korean network platform hit a record high of 90.6%.

Mouse : South Korea viewers per episode (millions)

Season	Episode number																				Average
Season	1	2	3	4	5	6	7	8	9	10	11	12	13	14	15	16	17	18	19	20	Average
1	1.115	1.047	1.452	1.530	1.483	1.596	1.476	1.637	1.362	1.385	1.376	1.207	1.314	1.170	1.152	1.227	1.349	1.328	1.400	1.519	1.356

Source: Audience measurement performed nationwide by Nielsen Korea.

Average TV viewership ratings
Ep.	Original broadcast date	Average audience share (AGB Nielsen)	
Ep.	Original broadcast date	Nationwide	Seoul
1	March 3, 2021	4.948% (1st)	5.370% (1st)
2	March 4, 2021	4.044% (2nd)	4.886% (2nd)
3	March 10, 2021	5.985% (1st)	6.461% (1st)
4	March 11, 2021	6.202% (1st)	7.160% (1st)
5	March 17, 2021	5.796% (1st)	6.929% (1st)
6	March 18, 2021	6.672% (1st)	7.530% (1st)
7	March 24, 2021	5.502% (2nd)	6.324% (2nd)
8	March 25, 2021	6.414% (1st)	7.362% (1st)
9	March 31, 2021	5.563% (2nd)	5.908% (2nd)
10	April 1, 2021	5.604% (1st)	6.233% (1st)
11	April 8, 2021 (Note: The episode on April 7, was not aired due to broadcast of re-election program.)	5.394% (1st)	5.673% (2nd)
12	April 14, 2021	5.163% (1st)	5.871% (1st)
13	April 15, 2021	5.374% (1st)	5.725% (1st)
14	April 21, 2021	4.964% (1st)	5.528% (1st)
15	April 22, 2021	4.901% (2nd)	5.040% (2nd)
16	May 5, 2021	5.003% (2nd)	5.617% (2nd)
17	May 6, 2021	5.392% (2nd)	6.036% (2nd)
18	May 12, 2021	5.479% (1st)	5.933% (1st)
19	May 13, 2021	5.603% (1st)	6.060% (1st)
20	May 19, 2021	6.246% (1st)	6.902% (1st)
Average		5.512%	6.127%
Special	April 7, 2021 (Note: "Mouse: Restart" consists of main cast interview, behind-the-scene clips, and a review of the first ten episodes.)	3.069% (2nd)	3.191% (2nd)
Special	May 10, 2021 (Note: "Mouse: The Theatrical Cut" is a 140-minute long episode reviewing the story portrayed in the first 17 episodes in a chronological order.)	1.545% (5th)	1.667% (5th)
Special	May 20, 2021 (Note: The special episode consists of main cast interview and unreleased footage.)	1.439% (5th)	2.052% (3rd)
Spin-off (Note: "Mouse: The Predator" reveals the serial murder from the perspective of the Predator, in order to help the audience understand the hidden narrative, before entering the second part of the story. More than 80% of the content in spin-offs was not aired in the previous episodes. The spin-offs were first released on the online platform TVING at 16:00 (KST) on April 28th, followed by television broadcast.)	April 28, 2021	4.160% (2nd)	4.753% (1st)
Spin-off	April 29, 2021	3.743% (2nd)	3.965% (2nd)
In the table above, the blue numbers represent the lowest ratings and the red numbers represent the highest ratings.; This drama airs on a cable channel/pay TV which normally has a relatively smaller audience compared to free-to-air TV/public broadcasters (KBS, SBS, MBC and EBS).

== Awards and nominations ==
Year	Award	Category	Recipient	Result	Ref.
2021	57th Baeksang Arts Awards	Best Supporting Actor	Lee Hee-joon	Nominated	
2021	2021 Asia Artist Awards	Grand Prize (Daesang)	Lee Seung-gi	Won	

== Adaptations ==
The Thai version of the series, consisting of 20 episodes, was released in 2025 on TrueID, every Friday at 8:00 p.m. It premiered on August 1, starring Shahkrit Yamnam, Chanon Santinatornkul, Chonlathorn Kongyingyong, Raviyanun Takerd, Thasorn Klinnium.
