= Dark Hole =

2021 South Korean television series

- Promotional poster
- Hangul: 다크홀
- RR: Dakeuhol
- MR: Tak'ŭhol
- Genre: Thriller; Mystery; Fantasy
- Created by: OCN
- Written by: Jung Yi-do
- Directed by: Kim Bong-joo
- Starring: Kim Ok-vin; Lee Joon-hyuk
- Composer: Jeung Seung Hyun
- Country of origin: South Korea
- Original language: Korean
- No. of episodes: 12

Production
- Executive producers: Han Ji Haing; Lee Jeong-soon
- Producers: Park Se Yeon; Kim Awol In; Ahn ho Ryum; Lee Min Jin; Kim Da Hine
- Running time: 60 minutes
- Production companies: Kiwi Media Group; WooSang Film

Original release
- Network: OCN tvN
- Release: April 30 – June 5, 2021

Dark Hole (Korean: 다크홀; RR: Dakeuhol) is a South Korean television series starring Kim Ok-vin and Lee Joon-hyuk. The fifth series of OCN's "Dramatic Cinema" project which combines film and drama formats, premiered on OCN TV on April 30, 2021.

== Synopsis ==
Dark Hole is about a detective and a wrecker driver who have to fight for their lives against mutants that are created when humans breathe mysterious dark smoke from a sinkhole.

== Cast ==
=== Main ===
- Kim Ok-vin as Lee Hwa-sun, a detective grieving over the death of her husband
- Lee Joon-hyuk as Yoo Tae-han, a former detective turned wrecker driver

=== Supporting ===
- Park Keun-rok as Choi Seung-tae
- Yoon Jung-hoon as Woo-sang
- Jang Sung-won as Lee Young-tae
- Kim Do-hoon as Lee Jin-seok
- Im Won-hee as Park Soon-il
- Zo Zee-An as Cho Hyun-ho
- Jeon Young-mi
- Kim Do-hoon as Lee Jin-seok
- Cho Ja-In as Cho Hyun-Ho
- Bae Jung-hwa
- Oh Yu-jin as Han Dong-rim
- Kim Byung-ki as Choi Kyeong-soo
- Kim Han-jong as Nam Yeong-sik
- Kim Byung-ki as Choi Kyung Soo
- Bae Jung-hwa as Han Ji-soo
- Kim Su-ol as Yoon Ji-Ae
- Lee Ha-eun as Yoon Saet-byeol
- Song Sang-eun as Kim Seon-nyeo
- Kim Kang-min as Min-gyu

=== Special appearances ===
- Tak Jae-hoon as Restaurant Owner
- Ahn Eun-jin as So Jung-hwa
- Kim Han Jong as Nam Young Sik
- Jung Hae-kyun as Lim Joo-ho
- Won Choon gyu as Nam Jin-Il
- Heo Hyeong-gyu as Kang Sung-Bum
- Choi Jung-kyu as Yoo Kang-soo
- Chung Su-bin

== Production ==
OCN announced its lineup of 2021 drama slate in November 2020 which included the fifth installment of the 'Dramatic Cinema' project, Dark Hole.

=== Casting ===
OCN revealed the casting news of Kim Ok-vin and Lee Joon-hyuk on October 9, 2020. On December 11, 2020, Yoon Jung-hoon was confirmed to join the cast and on December 14, 2020, Jang Sung-won reportedly joined the cast. The photos from the first script reading were released by OCN on March 2, 2021.

== Viewership ==
Dark Hole : South Korea viewers per episode (thousands)

| Season | Episode number | | | | | | | | | | | | Average |
| Season | 1 | 2 | 3 | 4 | 5 | 6 | 7 | 8 | 9 | 10 | 11 | 12 | Average |
|---|---|---|---|---|---|---|---|---|---|---|---|---|---|
| 1 | 427 | 572 | 309 | 410 | N/A | N/A | N/A | N/A | N/A | N/A | N/A | 297 | N/A |

Source: Audience measurement performed nationwide by Nielsen Korea (tvN ratings)

Average TV viewership ratings
| Ep. | Original broadcast date | Average audience share (Nielsen Korea) | | |
| Ep. | Original broadcast date | OCN | tvN | |
| Ep. | Original broadcast date | Nationwide | Nationwide | Seoul |
|---|---|---|---|---|
| 1 | April 30, 2021 | 1.025% (NR) | 1.882% (3rd) | 2.370% (3rd) |
| 2 | May 1, 2021 | 0.957% (NR) | 2.352% (3rd) | 2.873% (3rd) |
| 3 | May 7, 2021 | 0.8% (NR) | 1.070% (NR) | —N/a |
| 4 | May 8, 2021 | 0.8% (NR) | 1.647% (8th) | 1.769% (10th) |
| 5 | May 14, 2021 | 0.7% (NR) | 0.940% (20th) | 1.166% (9th) |
| 6 | May 15, 2021 | 0.8% (NR) | 0.9% (NR) | —N/a |
| 7 | May 21, 2021 | 0.6% (NR) | 0.9% (NR) | —N/a |
| 8 | May 22, 2021 | 0.6% (NR) | 1.1% (NR) | —N/a |
| 9 | May 28, 2021 | 0.5% (NR) | 0.98% (20th) | 1.137% (9th) |
| 10 | May 29, 2021 | 0.5% (NR) | 1.0% (NR) | —N/a |
| 11 | June 4, 2021 | 0.5% (NR) | 0.7% (NR) | —N/a |
| 12 | June 5, 2021 | 1.0% (NR) | 1.42% (11th) | 1.915% (5th) |
In the table above, the blue numbers represent the lowest ratings and the red numbers represent the highest ratings.; This drama airs on a cable channel/pay TV which normally has a relatively smaller audience compared to free-to-air TV/public broadcasters (KBS, SBS, MBC and EBS).; NR denotes that the series did not rank in the top 10 daily programs on that date.; N/A denotes that the rating is not known.
