= A Poem a Day =

2018 South Korean television series

- Promotional poster
- Hangul: 시를 잊은 그대에게
- Lit.: You Who Forgot Poetry
- RR: Sireul ijeun geudaeege
- MR: Sirŭl ijŭn kŭdaeege
- Genre: Medical; Slice of life
- Created by: Rhee Myung-han
- Written by: Myung Soo-hyun; Baek Sun-woo; Choi Bo-rim
- Directed by: Han Sang-jae
- Starring: Lee Yu-bi; Lee Joon-hyuk; Jang Dong-yoon
- Country of origin: South Korea
- Original language: Korean
- No. of episodes: 16

Production
- Running time: 60 minutes
- Production company: tvN

Original release
- Network: TvN
- Release: March 26 – May 15, 2018

A Poem a Day (Korean: 시를 잊은 그대에게) is a 2018 medical South Korean television series starring Lee Yu-bi, Lee Joon-hyuk and Jang Dong-yoon. It aired on tvN from March 26 to May 15, 2018, every Monday and Tuesday at 21:30 KST.

== Synopsis ==
The story of the lives of people who work at the hospital like physical therapists, rehabilitation therapists, radiographers, nurses, medical trainees and more.

== Cast ==
=== Main ===
- Lee Yu-bi as Woo Bo-young, a three-year physical therapist who wanted to become a poet.
- Lee Joon-hyuk as Ye Jae-wook, a physical therapy professor.
  - Ahn Do-gyu as young Ye Jae-wook
- Jang Dong-yoon as Shin Min-ho, a physical therapy trainee.

=== Supporting ===
==== Department of Physical Therapy ====
- Lee Chae-young as Kim Yoon-joo
- Seo Hyun-chul as Yang Myung-cheol
- Shin Jae-ha as Kim Nam-woo
- Kim Jae-beom as Park Shi-won
- Jeon Hye-won as Choi Yoon-hee
- Park Han-sol as Lee Shi-eun

==== Department of Radiology ====
- Park Sun-ho as Han Joo-yong
- Defconn as Kim Dae-bang

=== Special appearances ===
- Lee Kan-hee as Min-ho's mother
- Kim Il-woo as Min-ho's father
- Lee Hee-jin as Je-wook's ex-girlfriend (Ep. 5, 8-9)
- Lee Hae-in as Park Yeon-hee, Dae-bang's ex-girlfriend (Ep. 5)
- Mo Tae-bum as Mo Tae-bum, a sports star (Ep. 6)
- Go Se-won as Yoon-joo's ex-husband (Ep. 7)
- Ha Seok-jin as Ha Seok-jin, a patient (Ep. 11)
- Park Cho-rong as Kim Mi-rae, a college student (Ep. 12)
- Kim Won-hae as Kim Jung-soo, a doctor (Ep. 13)

== Production ==
Gong Myung was first offered the role of Shin Min-ho but declined.

== Viewership ==
A Poem a Day : South Korea viewers per episode (thousands)

Season	Episode number															
Season	1	2	3	4	5	6	7	8	9	10	11	12	13	14	15	16
1	297	347	335	341	193	230	217	226	N/A	N/A	N/A	N/A	N/A	N/A	N/A	N/A

Source: Audience measurement performed nationwide by Nielsen Korea.

Average TV viewership ratings
Ep.	Original broadcast date	Average audience share		
Ep.	Original broadcast date	Nielsen Korea		TNmS
Ep.	Original broadcast date	Nationwide	Seoul	Nationwide
1	March 26, 2018	1.357%	1.359%	2.0%
2	March 27, 2018	1.435%	1.402%	1.7%
3	April 2, 2018	1.185%	N/A	1.1%
4	April 3, 2018	1.429%	1.477%	2.1%
5	April 9, 2018	0.910%	N/A	0.9%
6	April 10, 2018	1.061%	1.129%	1.3%
7	April 16, 2018	0.941%	N/A	1.3%
8	April 17, 2018	0.925%	N/A	1.4%
9	April 23, 2018	0.768%	N/A	1.1%
10	April 24, 2018	0.987%	N/A	1.3%
11	April 30, 2018	0.900%	N/A	1.3%
12	May 1, 2018	0.977%	N/A	1.6%
13	May 7, 2018	0.769%	N/A	1.1%
14	May 8, 2018	0.785%	N/A	1.4%
15	May 14, 2018	0.925%	1.061%	1.2%
16	May 15, 2018	0.820%	N/A	1.0%
Average		1.011%	— (Note: Due to some unpublished ratings, the exact average rating is unknown.)	1.4%
In the table above, the blue numbers represent the lowest ratings and the red numbers represent the highest ratings.; N/A denotes that the rating is not known.; This series aired on a cable channel/pay TV which normally has a relatively smaller audience compared to free-to-air TV/public broadcasters (KBS, SBS, MBC and EBS).
