= A Killer Paradox =

2024 South Korean television series

- Promotional poster
- Also known as: Murder DIEary
- Hangul: 살인자ㅇ난감
- Hanja: 殺人者o難堪
- Lit.: The Murderer's Toy
- RR: Sarinjanangam
- MR: Sarinjanan'gam
- Genre: Crime thriller; Dark comedy
- Based on: A Killer Paradox by Kkomabi
- Developed by: Son Seung-ae (planning)
- Written by: Kim Da-min
- Directed by: Lee Chang-hee
- Starring: Choi Woo-shik; Son Suk-ku; Lee Hee-joon
- Music by: Dalpalan
- Country of origin: South Korea
- Original language: Korean
- No. of episodes: 8

Production
- Executive producer: Kim Ji-soo (CP)
- Producers: Jung Soo-jin; Kim Soon-ho; Kim Ji-yeon
- Cinematography: Park Se-seung
- Editor: Kim Woo-il
- Running time: 45–63 minutes
- Production companies: Showbox; Let's Film

Original release
- Network: Netflix
- Release: February 9, 2024

A Killer Paradox (Korean: 살인자ㅇ난감; stylized with a red O or ieung) is a 2024 South Korean crime thriller dark comedy television series written by Kim Da-min, directed by Lee Chang-hee, and starring Choi Woo-shik, Son Suk-ku, and Lee Hee-joon. Based on the Naver webtoon of the same name by Kkomabi, it tells the story of a man who accidentally murders a serial killer, and a detective who pursues him relentlessly. It was released on Netflix on February 9, 2024, and received generally positive reviews.

== Synopsis ==
Lee Tang, who was discharged from the army six months ago, struggles with his life and dreams of visiting Canada. He works at a convenience store and relies heavily on his parents for support. One night, he is assaulted by a customer, leading to a violent confrontation and the subsequent murder of the customer. Tang is guilt-ridden and prepares to turn himself in but discovers his victim was a serial killer. Dutiful detective Jang Nan-gam remains uncooperative and keeps investigating. It is unclear if Nan-gam is onto him, but Tang continues to kill, revealing his hidden talent for detecting and killing previously unpunished evildoers without leaving any traceable evidence. The story explores the question of whether Tang is serving justice or evading it.

== Cast and characters ==
=== Main ===
- Choi Woo-shik as Lee Tang

An ordinary college student who realizes that he has the ability to identify evil people after his first accidental murder

- Son Suk-ku as Jang Nan-gam

A detective who pursues a murder case committed by Lee Tang

- Lee Hee-joon as Song Chon

A former detective who hunts down Lee Tang

=== Supporting ===
- Kim Yo-han as Roh Bin

Name adopted from Robin; a sidekick who strives to help Lee Tang at all costs

- Kwon Da-ham as Yong-jae

The youngest detective of Violent Crime Team 1 at Daejeon Northern Police Station and Nan-gam's junior

- Hyun Bong-sik as Park Chung-jin

A detective of Violent Crime Team 1 at Daejeon Northern Police Station and Nan-gam's marksman

- Jung Yi-seo as Seon Yeo-ok

A murder witness

- Jo Hyun-woo as Kim Myeong-jin / Yeo Bu-il

A customer at the convenience store where Tang works who turns out as the suspect in a serial murder

- Roh Jae-won as Ha Sang-min

A man who spends time with his girlfriend, looking through old diaries

- Lim Se-joo as Choi Gyeong-ah

A woman living a hard life after being betrayed by her trusted lover. She changed her name and face after her private video was distributed by her ex-lover.

- Lee Joong-ok as Kang Sang-muk

A father who struggles after losing his daughter in an unexpected incident

- Seo Jae-kwon as Kang Jae-jun
- Baek Yu-sung as Lee Jin-seong
- Choi Sun-woo as Kyung-hwan

Tang's friend

- Moon Young-dong as Lee Gwan-hun
- Lee So-won as Yeon-seo
- Lee Joo-won as Jang Gab-su

Nan-gam's father and a former detective at Daejeon Northern Police Station

- Yang Mal-bok as Nan-gam's mother
- Oh Hye-won as Lee Yoo-jeong

A profiler at the Daejeon Metropolitan Police Department who is known for her sharp analytical skills and beauty

- Park Kyung-geun as Chief of the Criminal Division at Daejeon Northern Police Station
- Nam Jin-bok as Prosecutor Ji
- Lee Ji-hoon as Chief Moon
- Kim Min-ju as Lee Yeong

Tang's sister

- Joo In-young as Kang Jae-jun's mother
- Oh Min-ae as Deacon Kim, Tang's mother
- Heo Sun-haeng as Tang's father
- Kim Do-yeon as Soo Mart employee
- Jang Joon-hui as Violent Crime Team 1 leader

== Episodes ==
No.	Title	Directed by	Written by	Original release date
1	"Episode 1"	Lee Chang-hee	Kim Da-min	February 9, 2024
2	"Episode 2"	Lee Chang-hee	Kim Da-min	February 9, 2024
3	"Episode 3"	Lee Chang-hee	Kim Da-min	February 9, 2024
4	"Episode 4"	Lee Chang-hee	Kim Da-min	February 9, 2024
5	"Episode 5"	Lee Chang-hee	Kim Da-min	February 9, 2024
6	"Episode 6"	Lee Chang-hee	Kim Da-min	February 9, 2024
7	"Episode 7"	Lee Chang-hee	Kim Da-min	February 9, 2024
8	"Episode 8"	Lee Chang-hee	Kim Da-min	February 9, 2024

== Production and release ==
The series was directed by Lee Chang-hee, who previously worked on the film The Vanished (2018) and the series Hell Is Other People (2019). It was written by Kim Da-min, who won the grand prize in the 2019 Gyeonggi Scenario Planning and Development Feature Category. Showbox and Let's Film managed the production. Filming began in the second half of 2022 and took place in Daejeon. Choi Woo-shik, Son Suk-ku, and Lee Hee-joon were cast for the series.

Netflix confirmed that the show would be released on February 9, 2024.

== Reception ==
=== Critical response ===
On the review aggregator website Rotten Tomatoes, 100% of 9 critics' reviews are positive, with an average rating of 7.3/10. Pierce Conran of the South China Morning Post rated it 3/5 and wrote that it "eschews moral introspection in favour of something more troubling". Kate Sánchez of But Why Tho? rated it 9.5/10 and wrote that it is "darkly humorous, violent, and never boring, A Killer Paradox is a morality thriller like no other", adding, "what begins as a comedy of errors and morphs into a deep detective thriller, it's one of the finest series on Netflix". Joel Keller of Decider wrote that "while A Killer Paradox seems like a pretty straightforward show, it should have a lot of tense moments", adding that it may have twists along the way. Jonathan Wilson of Ready Steady Cut rated it 3/5 and wrote that "some will think it's great" and "others will find the conceit too trying" but "both will be right in about equal measure". David Opie of Radio Times rated it 3/5 and wrote that "tighter focus and keener sense of the message behind this conceit could have elevated the series more" but that "there's still tons of fun to be had when it comes to Killer's sheer ambition, not to mention the wish fulfilment of it all". Rhian Daly of NME rated it 4/5 and described the series as "far from a typical offering in the genre [that] adds flashes of other styles, like fantasy, into the mix" and "worlds apart from the usual murder and retribution fare", calling Choi Woo-shik, in particular, "phenomenal as the unlikely avenger". Pallavi Keswani of The Hindu wrote that "a product of smart writing, supported by some stellar performances, [it] emerges as slightly disturbing yet deeply intriguing watch". Melissa Camacho of Common Sense Media wrote that "overall, A Killer Paradox is an interesting thriller that requires close attention to fully understand what's happening".

=== Viewership ===
A Killer Paradox ranked second in Netflix's Global Top 10 TV (Non-English) category after three days of its release and received a warm response in 19 countries, being listed in the top 10, including in South Korea, Bolivia, India, Qatar, Hong Kong, Singapore, and Vietnam. The following week, the series topped the chart with 39.5 million hours watched by 5.5 million viewers, and remained on the chart for the next two consecutive weeks.

== Accolades ==
=== Awards and nominations ===
Name of the award ceremony, year presented, category, nominee of the award, and result of the nomination
Award ceremony	Year	Category	Nominee / Work	Result	Ref.
Asia Contents Awards & Global OTT Awards	2024	Best Newcomer Actor	Kim Yo-han	Won	
Asia Contents Awards & Global OTT Awards	2024	Best Creative	A Killer Paradox	Nominated	
Asia Contents Awards & Global OTT Awards	2024	Best Lead Actor	Choi Woo-shik	Nominated	
Asia Contents Awards & Global OTT Awards	2024	Best Supporting Actor	Lee Hee-joon	Nominated	
Baeksang Arts Awards	2024	Best Director	Lee Chang-hee	Nominated	
Baeksang Arts Awards	2024	Best Supporting Actor	Lee Hee-joon	Nominated	
Baeksang Arts Awards	2024	Best New Actor	Kim Yo-han	Nominated	
Blue Dragon Series Awards	2024	Best Drama	A Killer Paradox	Nominated	
Blue Dragon Series Awards	2024	Best Actor	Choi Woo-sik	Nominated	
Blue Dragon Series Awards	2024	Best Supporting Actor	Lee Hee-joon	Nominated	
Seoul International Drama Awards	2024	Outstanding Korean Drama	A Killer Paradox	Nominated	
Director's Cut Awards	2025	Best Director (Series)	Lee Chang-hee	Won	
Director's Cut Awards	2025	Best Actor (Series)	Lee Hee-joon	Won	
Director's Cut Awards	2025	Best Actor (Series)	Choi Woo-shik	Nominated	
Director's Cut Awards	2025	Best New Actress (Series)	Jung Yi-seo	Nominated	
Director's Cut Awards	2025	Best New Actor (Series)	Kim Yo-han	Won	
Director's Cut Awards	2025	Best New Actor (Series)	Hyun Bong-sik	Nominated	

=== Listicles ===
Name of publisher, year listed, name of listicle, and placement
Publisher	Year	Listicle	Placement	Ref.
NME	2024	The 10 best K-dramas of 2024 – so far	Included	
NME	2024	The 10 best Korean dramas of 2024	8th place	
South China Morning Post	2024	The 15 best K-dramas of 2024	13th place	
Entertainment Weekly	2025	The 21 best Korean shows on Netflix to watch now	Top 21	
