= Lee Joo-young (actress, born 1992) =

South Korean actress (born 1992)

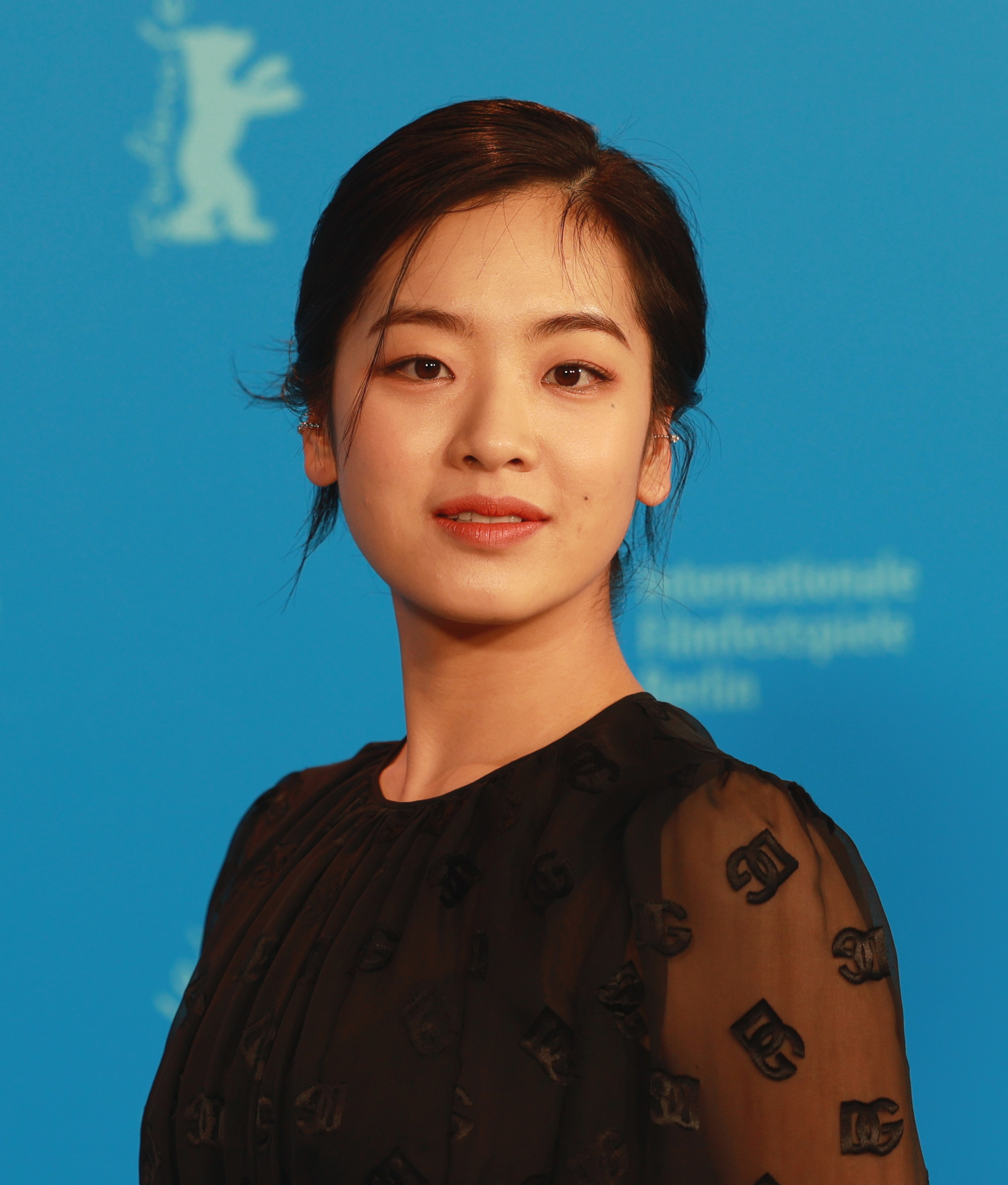
- Lee at the Berlin International Film Festival in February 2023
- Born: February 14, 1992 (age 34); South Korea
- Education: Kyung Hee University - Theater and Film
- Occupation: Actress
- Years active: 2011–present
- Agent: Ace Factory

Korean name
- Hangul: 이주영
- RR: I Juyeong
- MR: I Chuyŏng

Lee Joo-young (Korean: 이주영; born February 14, 1992) is a South Korean actress. Her most notable appearances are in the television series Weightlifting Fairy Kim Bok-joo (2016–17) and Itaewon Class (2020). She received her first lead role as reporter Seo Jeong-in in OCN thriller drama serial Times (2021).

== Filmography ==
=== Film ===
Year	Title	Role	Notes/Ref.
2011	Behinds		Short film
2012	Encounter		Short film
2013	Living Things		Short film
2013	Beauty of Journey		
2013	A Hidden Story		Short film
2015	The Transfer Student		Short film
2016	The Eternal Theme of Humanity		
2016	Chae's Movie Theater	Soo-yeon	
2016	A Quiet Dream	Joo-young	
2016	Jane	Ji-su	
2016	Jamsil	Young Jo Seong-sook	
2017	Alone Together	Ju-won	Short film
2017	An Algorithm	Lee Min-Ah	Featurette
2018	The Negotiation	Lee Da-bin	
2018	Maggie	Yeo Yoon-young	
2020	Baseball Girl	Joo Soo-in	
2022	Broker	Detective Lee	
2022	Leave at Door, Bell X	Director	Premiere at 27th BIFF; Short film
2023	Green Night	Green haired girl	

=== Television series ===
Year	Title	Role	Notes	Ref.
2016–17	Weightlifting Fairy Kim Bok-joo	Lee Seon-ok		
2018	Something in the Rain	Lee Ye-eun		
2018	The Ghost Detective	Gil Chae-won		
2019	Drama Special	Jo Soo-ah	Episode: "Home Sweet Home"	
2020	Itaewon Class	Ma Hyun-yi		
2021	Times	Seo Jung-in	First lead role	

=== Web series ===
Year	Title	Role	Notes/Ref.
2016	Women at a Game Company	Joo-young	
2016	Horror Delivery Service		
2017	Someone Noticeable		
2017	Hip Hop Teacher	Gong Seul-gi	
2023	The Deal	Cha Soo-an	Special appearance
2025	No Mercy	Ha So-min	

=== Web shows ===
Year	Title	Role	Ref.
2022	Young Actors' Retreat	Cast member	

=== Hosting ===
Year	Event	Notes	Ref.
2021	Closing ceremony 26th Busan International Film Festival	with Lee Joon-hyuk	

=== Music video appearances ===
Year	Song title	Artist
2015	"Weltanschauung"	Hail
2016	"Wish Tree"	Red Velvet
2016	"12:25"	f(x)
2016	"Pain Poem"	Kim Bum-soo and Kenzie
2016	"Liquor"	Sleeq
2019	"With You"	Crush

== Stage ==
=== Theater ===
Year	Play	Notes	Ref.
2025	Shakespeare in Love	Viola De Lesseps	

== Awards and nominations ==
Name of the award ceremony, year presented, category, nominee of the award, and the result of the nomination
Award ceremony	Year	Category	Nominee / Work	Result	Ref.
Asia Artist Awards	2020	Best Icon Award	Lee Joo-young	Won	
Baeksang Arts Awards	2018	Best New Actress – Film	Jane	Nominated	
Baeksang Arts Awards	2021	Best New Actress – Television	Times	Nominated	
Blue Dragon Film Awards	2021	Best New Actress	Baseball Girl	Nominated	
Buil Film Awards	2017	Best New Actress	Jane	Nominated	
Buil Film Awards	2020	Best Actress	Baseball Girl	Nominated	
Buil Film Awards	2022	Best Supporting Actress	Broker	Nominated	
Busan International Film Festival	2018	Actress of the Year	Maggie	Won	
BIFF Marie Claire Asia Star Awards	2019	Rising Star Award	Maggie	Won	
Chunsa Film Art Awards	2018	Best New Actress	Jane	Nominated	
Goyang Smart Film Festival	2014	Best Actress	A Hidden Story	Won	
KBS Drama Awards	2018	Best New Actress	The Ghost Detective	Nominated	
KBS Drama Awards	2019	Best Actress in a One-Act/Special/Short Drama	Home Sweet Home	Won	
Korea Culture Entertainment Awards	2022	Best Actress Award	Broker	Won	
Seoul Independent Film Festival	2019	Independent Star Award	Baseball Girl	Won	
Wildflower Film Awards	2017	Best Supporting Actress	A Quiet Dream	Nominated	
Wildflower Film Awards	2020	Best Actress	Maggie	Nominated	
