= Baeksang Arts Award for Best Supporting Actor – Television =

Korean media award

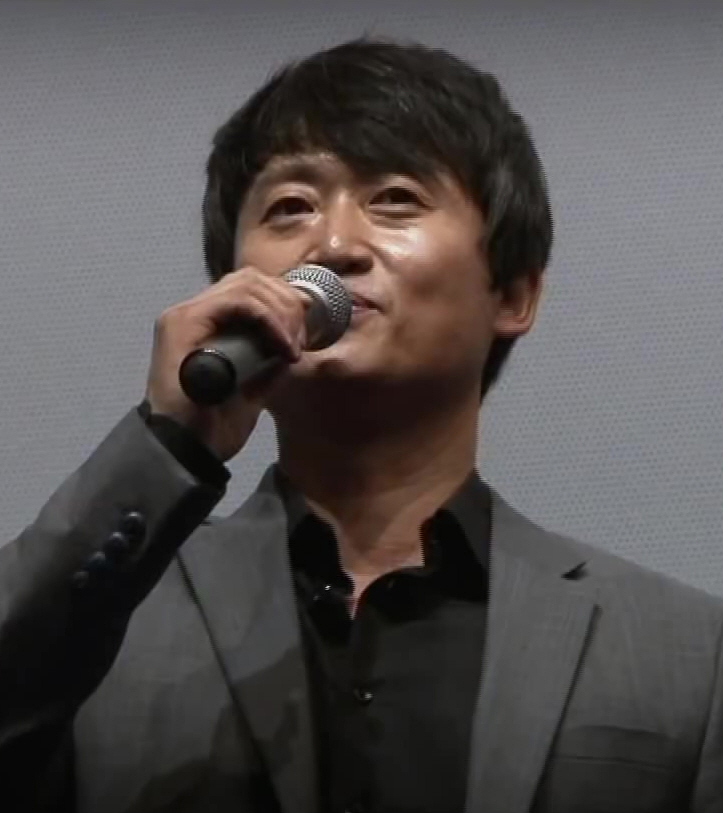
- 2026 recipient: Yoo Seung-mok
- Awarded for: Best performance by an actor in a supporting role in a South Korean series
- Country: South Korea
- Presented by: Baeksang Arts Awards
- Most recent winner: Yoo Seung-mok; The Dream Life of Mr. Kim (2026)
- Website: baeksangartsawards

The Baeksang Arts Award for Best Supporting Actor – Television (Korean: 백상예술대상 TV부문 남자 조연상; RR: Baeksang Yesul Daesang TV Bumun Namja Joyeonsang) is an award presented annually at the Baeksang Arts Awards ceremony organised by Ilgan Sports and JTBC Plus, affiliates of JoongAng Ilbo, usually in the second quarter of each year in Seoul.

== Winners and nominees ==
Table key
‡	Indicates the winner

=== 2010s ===
Year	Winner	Television series	Original title	Role(s)	Network
2018 (54th)	Park Ho-san ‡	Prison Playbook	슬기로운 감빵생활	Kang Chul-doo	tvN
2018 (54th)	Ahn Jae-hong	Fight for My Way	쌈 마이웨이	Kim Joo-man	KBS2
2018 (54th)	Bong Tae-gyu	Return	리턴	Kim Hak-Beom	SBS
2018 (54th)	Jung Sang-hoon	The Lady in Dignity	품위있는 그녀	Ahn Jae-suk	JTBC
2018 (54th)	Yoo Jae-myung	Stranger	비밀의 숲	Lee Chang-joon	tvN
2019 (55th)	Kim Byung-chul ‡	Sky Castle	SKY 캐슬	Cha Min-hyuk	JTBC
2019 (55th)	Bae Seong-woo	Live	라이브	Oh Yang-chon	tvN
2019 (55th)	Kim Sang-kyung	The Crowned Clown	왕이 된 남자	Yi Kyu (a.k.a. Haksan)	tvN
2019 (55th)	Son Ho-jun	The Light in Your Eyes	눈이 부시게	Kim Young-soo	JTBC
2019 (55th)	Yoo Yeon-seok	Mr. Sunshine	미스터 션샤인	Goo Dong-mae / Ishida Sho	tvN

=== 2020s ===
Year	Winner and nominees	Television series	Original title	Role(s)	Network
2020 (56th)	Oh Jung-se ‡	When the Camellia Blooms	동백꽃 필 무렵	No Gyu-tae	KBS2
2020 (56th)	Jeon Seok-ho	Hyena	하이에나	Ga Ki-hyuk	SBS
2020 (56th)	Kim Young-min	The World of the Married	부부의 세계	Son Je-hyuk	JTBC
2020 (56th)	Yang Kyung-won	Crash Landing on You	사랑의 불시착	Pyo Chi-su	tvN
2020 (56th)	Yoo Jae-myung	Itaewon Class	이태원 클라쓰	Jang Dae-hee	JTBC
2021 (57th)	Oh Jung-se ‡	It's Okay to Not Be Okay	사이코지만 괜찮아	Moon Sang-tae	tvN
2021 (57th)	Kim Seon-ho	Start-Up	스타트업	Han Ji-pyeong	tvN
2021 (57th)	Kim Ji-hoon	Flower of Evil	악의 꽃	Baek Hee-sung	tvN
2021 (57th)	Lee Hee-joon	Mouse	마우스	Go Moo-chi	tvN
2021 (57th)	Choi Dae-hoon	Beyond Evil	괴물	Park Jung-je	JTBC
2022 (58th)	Cho Hyun-chul ‡	D.P.	D.P.	Cho Seok-bong	Netflix
2022 (58th)	Lee Deok-hwa	The Red Sleeve	옷소매 붉은 끝동	King Yeongjo of Joseon	MBC
2022 (58th)	Lee Hak-joo	Political Fever	이렇게 된 이상 청와대로 간다	Kim Soo-jin	Wavve
2022 (58th)	Lee Hyun-wook	Mine	마인:MINE	Han Ji-yong	tvN
2022 (58th)	Heo Sung-tae	Squid Game	오징어 게임	Jang Deok-su	Netflix
2023 (59th)	Jo Woo-jin ‡	Narco-Saints	수리남	Byeon Ki-tae	Netflix
2023 (59th)	Kang Ki-young	Extraordinary Attorney Woo	이상한 변호사 우영우	Jung Myung-seok	ENA
2023 (59th)	Kim Do-hyun	Reborn Rich	재벌집 막내아들	Choi Chang-je	JTBC
2023 (59th)	Kim Jun-han	Anna	안나	Choi Ji-hoon	Coupang Play
2023 (59th)	Park Sung-hoon	The Glory	더 글로리	Jeon Jae-joon	Netflix
2024 (60th)	Ahn Jae-hong ‡	Mask Girl	마스크걸	Joo Oh-nam	Netflix
2024 (60th)	Ryu Kyung-soo	The Bequeathed	선산	Kim Young-ho	Netflix
2024 (60th)	Lee Yi-kyung	Marry My Husband	내 남편과 결혼해줘	Park Min-hwan	tvN
2024 (60th)	Lee Hee-joon	A Killer Paradox	살인자ㅇ난감	Song Chon	Netflix
2024 (60th)	Ji Seung-hyun	Korea–Khitan War	고려거란전쟁	Yang Gyu	KBS2
2025 (61st)	Choi Dae-hoon ‡	When Life Gives You Tangerines	폭싹 속았수다	Bu Sang-gil	Netflix
2025 (61st)	Kim Jun-han	Good Partner	굿파트너	Jung Woo-jin	SBS
2025 (61st)	Roh Jae-won	Squid Game 2	오징어게임2	Nam-gyu	Netflix
2025 (61st)	Yoon Kyung-ho	The Trauma Code: Heroes on Call	중증외상센터	Han Yoo-rim	Netflix
2025 (61st)	Hyun Bong-sik	Dongjae, the Good or the Bastard	좋거나 나쁜 동재	Jo Byeong-gun	TVING, tvN
2026 (62nd)	Yoo Seung-mok	The Dream Life of Mr. Kim	서울 자가에 대기업 다니는 김 부장 이야기	Baek Jeong-tae	JTBC
2026 (62nd)	Kim Gun-woo	You and Everything Else	은중과 상연	Kim Sang-hak	Netflix
2026 (62nd)	Yoo Jae-myung	Love Me	러브 미	Seo Jin-ho	JTBC
2026 (62nd)	Jang Seung-jo	As You Stood By	당신이 죽였다	Noh Jin-pyo / Jang Kang	Netflix
2026 (62nd)	Jin Seon-kyu	Aema	애마	Gu Jung-ho	Netflix

== Sources ==
- "Baeksang Arts Awards Nominees and Winners Lists". Naver Movie (in Korean).
- "Baeksang Arts Awards Winners Lists". Baeksang Arts Awards (in Korean).
