= Lee Hee-jun =

South Korean actor (born 1979)

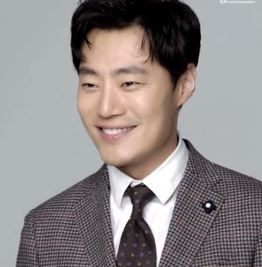
- Lee in 2018
- Born: June 29, 1979 (age 47); Daegu, South Korea
- Other name: Lee Hee-joon
- Education: Yeungnam University (Chemical Engineering); Korea National University of Arts (Theater)
- Occupation: Actor
- Years active: 1998–present
- Agent: BH Entertainment
- Spouse: Lee Hye-jung (m. 2016)

Korean name
- Hangul: 이희준
- RR: I Huijun
- MR: I Hŭijun
- Website: bhent.co.kr

Lee Hee-jun (Korean: 이희준; born June 29, 1979) is a South Korean actor. He first gained recognition portraying a minor character in the television series My Husband Got a Family (2012). Lee is best known for the films 1987: When the Day Comes (2017), Miss Baek (2018), The Man Standing Next (2020), and Handsome Guys (2024), as well as the television series The Queen of Office (2013), Steal Heart (2014), Mouse (2021), and A Killer Paradox (2024).

== Early life and education ==
Lee was born on June 29, 1979 in Songhyeon-dong, Dalseo District, Daegu, South Korea. After completing high school without knowing what he wanted to do, he entered the Department of Chemical Engineering at Yeungnam University.

The turning point in his life came a week before his military enlistment, when he had a farewell party and got into a car accident that required major surgery. As a result, he was exempted from military service. Despite being exempt, he lost interest in his studies and wandered for a while, spending his days playing guitar, singing, and drinking. During this time, he happened to see a poster for a children's theatre company in Daegu and out of curiosity, he visited the theatre company. Lee worked as the youngest member of the Daegu theatre company "Onnuri" for approximately 2 years and 6 months. Instead of being an actor, his role within the troupe involved tasks such as cleaning, cooking, and putting up posters. Lee independently studied and followed Stanislavsky's book Actor's Class.

Lee debuted on in 1999 with the play Tourist Zone. He discovered a passion for acting while performing in children's plays such as The Jungle Book and Cinderella. Later on, he developed a strong desire to receive formal acting training, which led him to drop out of the chemical engineering department at Yeungnam University.

== Career ==
In 2002, Lee, who dropped out of Yeungnam University, met Lee Yun-taek and joined the Yeonheedan street troupe and lived at Miryang Theater Village for a year. He also appeared as King Oedipus in the opening production of the 2nd Miryang Theater Festival, Oedipus.

Afterwards, Lee moved to Chaimu Theater Company and played the lead role, making a name for himself in Daehakro.

Afterwards, he wanted to take acting lessons in a more systematic way, so he applied to Korea National University of Arts, but was rejected. In the end, he took the exam again and proudly entered school at the age of 24 (Class of 2003). The university is famous for its rigorous, practical-oriented curriculum. When he was an engineering student, he was tired of theory classes, so life at a practical-oriented Korean art school was like heaven. To paraphrase his own words, "I loved school." So good was he that he attended on scholarship for all eight semesters, three of which he even received full scholarships.

In 2005, he further showcased his talent by appearing in the musical Lee. He continued to hone his acting skills through various projects, including notable works like The King and the Clown and the 2007 play Byun. In 2009, he further enriched his repertoire with performances in Melodrama and There in Chuncheon.

Lee showcased the acting experience he accumulated through his involvement in musicals and theater productions, transitioning to the screen and television. He made a notable appearance in the 2007 film Secret Sunshine, portraying a minor character that garnered attention due to his captivating presence. Subsequently, he actively pursued supporting roles, featuring in films such as The Predators (2009), Unfair Trade (2010), The Yellow Sea (2010), Heartbeat (2011), Special Edition (2012), and Detective Cha (2012).

Lee also appeared on TV as a member of the Chaimu Troupe. When he appeared in the play B Unso in 2010, he was noticed by KBS drama special producer and began to make a name for himself by appearing in several one-act plays. Lee gained recognition through the KBS2 drama special Texas Hits in 2010, where he portrayed a gangster running a gambling site and impressed viewers with his acting. At the time, he was called a "star of one-act plays".

After that, he appeared in drama serial series Perfect Spy. At the press conference, actor Son Hyun-joo praised Lee, saying, "He will become a star like Song Sae-byeok."

After Perfect Spy, Lee Hee-jun appeared in Cupid Factory where he portrayed the character of So-jun, a composer who struggled to write a song due to a lack of dating experience. Despite the absurd premise of purchasing a machine at Cupid Factory to make oneself fall in love, Lee portrayed the character effortlessly, creating an engaging story that was well received by viewers. He emerged as a promising actor discovered by the KBS drama department.

In 2012, Lee then appeared in the KBS hit drama My Husband Got a Family, where he portrayed Cheon Jae-yong, a charming and innocent man. His presence in the drama played a significant role in shaping his career, contributing to his success, and gaining public awareness and popularity. He won the Best New Actor Award in the TV category at the Baeksang Arts Awards in 2013.

Lee joined the theater company "Ganda Performance Delivery Service" as an early member. The company was formed by friends who collaborated on creative projects while attending Korea National University of Arts, with CEO Min Jun-ho at the forefront. Jin Seon-kyu, was also part of the company in its early stages.

Lee later appeared in several works including Jeon Woo-chi, God of the Workplace, Yuna's Street, Mistress, and the movies Sea Fog, 1987, Miss Baek, and Namsan Managers. In each of these works, he showcased a high level of character immersion, transcending both the small and big screens. As a result, he was reborn as a 'trustworthy actor'.

In 2025, Lee starred in Netflix's crime thriller television series Karma directed by Lee Il-hyung. It is based on the Kakao webtoon of the same name by Choi Hee-seon, about people who are unexpectedly entangled and destroy each other while pursuing their own desires.

== Personal life ==
Lee Hee-jun and model Lee Hye-jung confirmed their relationship in August 2015. They registered their marriage prior to the ceremony and had their private wedding ceremony in a wedding hall in Yongsan, Seoul on April 23, 2016.

== Filmography ==
Key
†	Denotes films that have not yet been released

=== Film ===
Year	Title	Role	Notes	Ref.
2003	A State of Distrust		Short film	
2004	Who is Coming For Me		Short film	
2005	Roadless		Short film	
2005	The Happy Ending, with Fear		Short film	
2006	Save Me		Short film	
2006	The Theory & Practice of Graduation		Short film	
2006	Red Butterfly		Short film	
2006	Waiting for Passion		Short film	
2007	Secret Sunshine			
2007	Resurrection of the Butterfly			
2007	Room of Goldfish		Short film	
2007	Bolex Lorelei		Short film	
2007	Ko Pil-deok		Short film	
2008	Zero-Sum		Short film	
2009	The Pit and the Pendulum	Seong-ik		
2009	A Worse Crime		Short film	
2009	I'm in Trouble!	Si-hyeong		
2009	Being a Traveler		Short film	
2010	The Unjust	Detective Nam		
2010	The Yellow Sea	Bo-eun policeman		
2011	Heartbeat	Pharmacist		
2011	Moby Dick	Hyeon-deok		
2011	Quick	Head of Dae-mang department		
2011	S.I.U.	Geun-soo		
2011	Communique		Short film	
2012	Nameless Gangster: Rules of the Time	College student 1		
2012	Helpless	No Seung-joo		
2012	Runway Cop	Kyeong-seok		
2013	Dear Dolphin	Kim Hyeok-geun		
2013	The Flu	Byeong-gi		
2013	Marriage Blue	Dae-bok		
2014	Haemoo	Chang-wook		
2015	SORI: Voice from the Heart	Jin-ho		
2016	A Melody to Remember	Hook		
2016	Worst Woman	Woon-cheol	Special appearance	
2016	Misbehavior	Pyo Sang-woo		
2017	A Special Lady	Choi Dae-sik		
2017	1987: When the Day Comes	Yoon Sang-sam		
2018	Miss Baek	Jang-sub		
2018	The Drug King	Choi Jin-pil		
2019	Another Child	Park Seo-bang		
2020	The Man Standing Next	Cha Ji-chul		
2020	Oh! My gran	Do-won		
2021	Somewhat High Humidity			
2022	Bystanders	Kim Nak-su	Short film	
2024	Badland Hunters	Yang Gi-su	Netflix film	
2024	Handsome Guys	Park Sang-goo		
2024	Bogota: City of the Lost	Soo-young		
2026	The Table: Day and Night	Dong-man	Opening film of BIFF	

=== Television series ===
Year	Title	Role	Notes	Ref.
2007	Que Sera Sera	Bit part; Ep. 4		
2008	Crime 2			
2010	KBS Drama Special - "An Awful Lot of Coincidences"	Number 1		
2010	KBS Drama Special - "Texas Hit"	Min-seok		
2011	Drama Special Series - "Perfect Spy"	Lee Sang-joon		
2011	KBS Drama Special - "Cupid Factory"	Yoo So-joon		
2011	KBS Drama Special - "Identical Criminals"	Jeong Jong-doo		
2011	The Princess' Man	Gong Chil-goo		
2012	KBS Drama Special - "Swamp Ecology Report"			
2012	Wild Romance	Go Jae-hyo		
2012	My Husband Got a Family	Cheon Jae-yong		
2012	Jeon Woo-chi	Kang Rim		
2013	The Queen of Office	Moo Jeong-han		
2014	Steal Heart	Kim Chang-man		
2016	The Legend of the Blue Sea	Jo Nam-doo		
2017	The Last Blossom	In-cheol		
2018	Drama Stage - Not Played	Jo Seong-wook		
2018	Mistress	Han Sung-joon		
2021	Vincenzo	Unnamed robber #2	Cameo	
2021	Mouse	Go Moo-chi		
2021	Chimera	Lee Joong-yeob		
2022	Behind Every Star	Himself	Cameo (Episode 2)	
2024	A Killer Paradox	Song Chon		
2024	Blood Free	Seonu Jae		
2025	Love Scout	Peter Kwon	Cameo (Episode 1)	
2025	Karma	Park Jae-yeong		
2025	Nine Puzzles	Kang Chi-mok	Cameo	
2026	The Scarecrow	Cha Si-young		
TBA	When the Day Breaks †			
2026	Dead-End Job	Mr. S		

== Stage ==
=== Dance ===
Dance performances
Year	Title		Role	Ref.
Year	English	Korean	Role	Ref.
2004	Knife	칼		
2005	Gangbyeonbuk-ro	강변북로		

=== Musical ===
Musical performances
Year	Title		Role	Ref.
Year	English	Korean	Role	Ref.
2001	Animal Farm	동물농장		
2006	Yi	이 (爾)		
2007	Jargon	변		
2008; 2012	The Mirror Princes Pyeonggang Story	거울공주 평강이야기	Soldier 1	
2009	Bachelor's Vegetable Store	총각네 야채가게		
2009	Puberty	사춘기		

=== Theatre ===
List of Stage Play(s)
Year	Title		Role	Ref.
Year	English	Korean	Role	Ref.
1999–2000	Tourist station	관광지대		
2002	Oedipus	오이디푸스	Oedipus	
2005	Come and See Me	날 보러 와요		
2005	How are you all	모두 안녕하십니까?		
2006	Silence	고요		
2007	Byeonsangdo Team	변상도팀		
2007	Hongdongji nori	홍동지 놀이		
2007	Melodrama	멜로드라마	Kim Chan-il	
2008	Let's go! Third, "Annapurna in My Heart"	우르르~간다! 세 번째 "내 마음의 안나푸르나"	Son-in-law	
2008	Naeon Theater Opening Commemoration Parade: End Room	나온씨어터 개관기념 퍼레이드 : 끝방	Father	
2008	Let's go to karaoke... Shall we talk?	우리 노래방 가서... 얘기 좀 할까?	Father	
2009	Let's go to karaoke... Shall we talk?	우리 노래방 가서... 얘기 좀 할까?	Karaoke owner	
2009	Chuncheon	춘천거기	Jihwan	
2010	B Word	B언소 (蜚言所)		
2011–2012	The Tale of an Old Thief	늘근도둑 이야기	Younger thief	
2012	Wedding Scandal	웨딩 스캔들		
2014–2019	Me and Grandpa	나와 할아버지	Jun-hee	
2014	The Cosmonaut's Last Message to the Woman He Once Loved in the Former Soviet Union	한때 사랑했던 여자에게 보내는 구소련 우주비행사의 마지막 메시지	Erick/ Hyland Bar owner	
2022	Even Then Today	그때도 오늘	Man 1	
2024	Flower, Stars Passing By	꽃, 별이 지나	Hee-min	

== Awards and nominations ==
Name of the award ceremony, year presented, category, nominee of the award, and the result of the nomination
Award ceremony	Year	Category	Nominee / Work	Result	Ref.
Asia Contents Awards & Global OTT Awards	2024	Best Supporting Actor	A Killer Paradox	Nominated	
Baeksang Arts Awards	2013	Best New Actor – Television	My Husband Got a Family	Won	
Baeksang Arts Awards	2020	Best Supporting Actor – Film	The Man Standing Next	Nominated	
Baeksang Arts Awards	2021	Best Supporting Actor – Television	Mouse	Nominated	
Baeksang Arts Awards	2024	Best Supporting Actor – Television	A Killer Paradox	Nominated	
Baeksang Arts Awards	2025	Best Actor – Film	Handsome Guys	Nominated	
Blue Dragon Film Awards	2021	Best Supporting Actor	The Man Standing Next	Nominated	
Blue Dragon Series Awards	2024	Best Supporting Actor	A Killer Paradox	Nominated	
Buil Film Awards	2020	Best Supporting Actor	The Man Standing Next	Won	
Chunsa Film Art Awards	2020	Best Supporting Actor	The Man Standing Next	Nominated	
Director's Cut Awards	2022	Best New Actor in Film	The Man Standing Next	Nominated	
Director's Cut Awards	2025	Best Actor in Series	A Killer Paradox	Won	
Gwangju International Film Festival	2013	New Star Award	Lee Hee-joon	Won	
KBS Drama Awards	2011	Best Actor in a One-Act Drama/Special	Perfect Spy, Cupid Factory, Identical Criminals	Won	
KBS Drama Awards	2012	Best Couple Award	Lee Hee-joon (with Jo Yoon-hee); My Husband Got a Family	Won	
KBS Drama Awards	2012	Best New Actor	My Husband Got a Family	Won	
KBS Drama Awards	2013	Best Supporting Actor	Queen of the Office	Nominated	
Korea Drama Awards	2012	Excellence Award, Actor	My Husband Got a Family	Won	
Korea Drama Awards	2012	Special Jury Prize	My Husband Got a Family	Won	
SBS Drama Awards	2016	Excellence Award, Actor in a Fantasy Drama	The Legend of the Blue Sea	Nominated	
Wildflower Film Awards	2017	Best Supporting Actor/Actress	Worst Woman	Nominated	
