= Kim Do-hoon (actor) =

South Korean actor (born 1998)

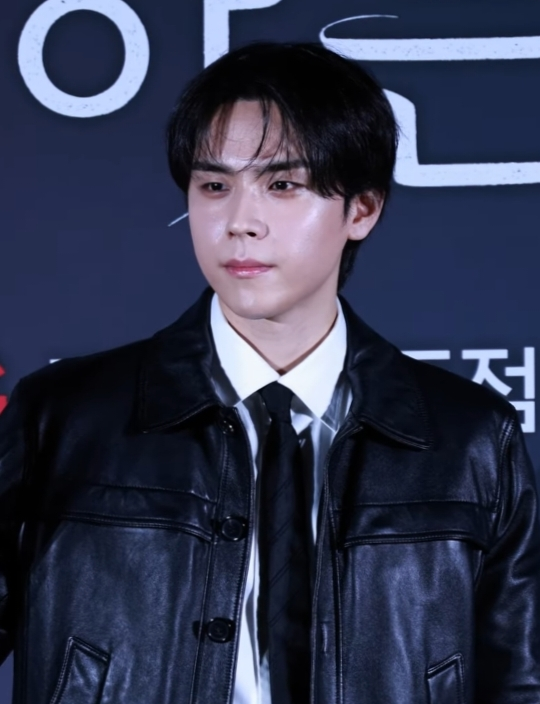
- Kim at the press conference for Dear X
- Born: September 15, 1998 (age 28); South Korea
- Education: Chung-Ang University
- Occupations: Actor; model
- Years active: 2016–present
- Agent: Sem Company

Korean name
- Hangul: 김도훈
- RR: Gim Dohun
- MR: Kim Tohun

Kim Do-hoon (Korean: 김도훈; born September 15, 1998) is a South Korean actor. He is best known for his role in Moving (2023), Today's Webtoon (2023), The Escape of the Seven (2023), and Dear X (2025).

== Early life and education ==
After graduating from Kaywom Arts High School, Kim enrolled in Chung-Ang University's Department of Theater and Film.

== Filmography ==
=== Film ===
| Year | Title | Role | Notes/Ref. |
|---|---|---|---|
| 2016 | Following | | |
| 2018 | Gate | Won-ho | |
| 2019 | Days of Wraith 2 | | |
| 2019 | The Faceless Boss | Young-jae | |
| 2020 | The Faceless Boss: The Untold Story | Young-jae | |
| 2021 | The Hypnosis | Byung-jun | |
| 2024 | Handsome Guys | Jason | |
| TBA | Dochabi | Tae-san | Netflix film |

=== Television series ===
| Year | Title | Role | Notes | Ref. |
|---|---|---|---|---|
| 2019 | My Absolute Boyfriend | Yoo Jin | | |
| 2019 | Doctor John | Park Jung-bo | Cameo (Ep. 1-4, 23) | |
| 2021 | Dark Hole | Lee Jin-seok | | |
| 2021 | Here's My Plan | Cho Yoon-ho | | |
| 2022 | Today's Webtoon | Shin Dae-ryuk | | |
| 2022 | Fly High Butterfly | Yoon Dong-yeol | Cameo (Ep. 15) | |
| 2022 | The Law Cafe | Bae Joon | | |
| 2023 | Drama Special: Confession Attack | Cha Seok-jin | One-act drama | |
| 2023 | The Escape of the Seven | K / Shim Joon-seok | | |
| 2023 | Moving | Lee Gang-hoon | | |
| 2024 | Your Honor | Song Ho-young | | |
| 2025 | Love Scout | Woo Jung-hoon | | |
| 2025 | Dear X | Kim Jae-oh | | |

=== Web series ===
| Year | Title | Role | Ref. |
|---|---|---|---|
| 2018 | My Woofy Poofy Love | Geum Dol | |
| 2018 | Your Imagination Becomes Reality | Kim Ha-neul | |

=== Web shows ===
| Year | Title | Role | Ref. |
|---|---|---|---|
| 2024 | Agents of Mystery | Cast member | |

== Accolades ==
=== Awards and nominations ===
Name of the award ceremony, year presented, category, nominee of the award, and the result of the nomination
| Award ceremony | Year | Category | Nominee / Work | Result | Ref. |
|---|---|---|---|---|---|
| Korea Drama Awards | 2022 | Best New Actor | Today's Webtoon | Won | |
| SBS Drama Awards | 2023 | Best New Actor | The Escape of the Seven | Won | |
| SBS Drama Awards | 2025 | Excellence Award, Actor in a Seasonal Drama | Love Scout | Won | |

=== Listicles ===
Name of publisher, year listed, name of listicle, and placement
| Publisher | Year | Listicle | Placement | Ref. |
|---|---|---|---|---|
| Forbes Korea | 2026 | Forbes Korea 30 Under 30 | Included | |
