= Dongjae, the Good or the Bastard =

2024 South Korean television series

- Promotional poster
- Also known as: Dongjae: The Good or the Bad
- Hangul: 좋거나 나쁜 동재
- Lit.: Good or Bad Dong-jae
- RR: Jokeona nappeun Dongjae
- MR: Chok'ŏna nappŭn Tongjae
- Genre: Crime thriller; Legal drama
- Created by: Lee Soo-yeon
- Written by: Hwang Ha-jung; Kim Sang-won
- Directed by: Park Gun-ho
- Starring: Lee Joon-hyuk; Park Sung-woong
- Music by: Kim Joon-seok; Jeong Se-rin
- Country of origin: South Korea
- Original language: Korean
- No. of episodes: 10

Production
- Executive producer: Lee Hye-young
- Producers: Lee Myung-jin; Lee Yu-bin; Lee Seung-eun
- Running time: 42–56 minutes
- Production companies: Studio Dragon; Ace Factory; Higround

Original release
- Network: TVING
- Release: October 10 – November 7, 2024
- Network: tvN
- Release: October 14 – November 12, 2024

Related
- Stranger (2017–2020)

Dongjae, the Good or the Bastard (Korean: 좋거나 나쁜 동재) is a 2024 South Korean crime thriller legal drama television series created by Lee Soo-yeon, co-written by Hwang Ha-jung and Kim Sang-won, directed by Park Gun-ho, and starring Lee Joon-hyuk and Park Sung-woong. The series is a spin-off of the Korean drama Stranger by Lee S. and revolves around the life of Seo Dong-jae as a prosecutor. It was released on TVING from October 10, to November 7, 2024, and aired on tvN from October 14, to November 12, 2024. It will also be available for streaming on Paramount+ in selected regions.

Dongjae, the Good or the Bastard was invited as one of the six drama series in the On Screen section of the 29th Busan International Film Festival.

== Synopsis ==
Seo Dong-jae, who works at the Cheongju District Prosecutors' Office, has a bleak future due to the stigma attached to his past as a corrupt prosecutor. While struggling with a redevelopment case, he is assigned to the case of the murder of a high school girl and begins a dangerous tightrope walk between his intuition as a prosecutor and his instincts as an opportunist.

== Cast and characters ==
=== Main ===
- Lee Joon-hyuk as Seo Dong-jae

A prosecutor at Cheongju District Prosecutors' Office, who wants to be recognized in the present rather than his corrupt past.

- Park Sung-woong as Nam Wan-sung

CEO of Lee Hong Construction, who appears in front of Dong-jae and brings up his past mistakes.

=== Supporting ===
- Lee Seong-woo

- Kim Su-gyeom as Nam Gyeo-re

Wan-sung's son, who obeys his father's words.

- Shim Wan-joon as Choi Kang-min
- Lee Hang-na as Jeon Mi-ran
- Jung Woon-sun as Kim Ji-hui

== Production ==
In February 2023, Lee Joon-hyuk was cast to reprise his role but this time as the main character. Studio Dragon confirmed the spin-off series production under the working title Good or Bad Dong-jae, with principal photography to began in May 2023, and writer Lee Soo-yeon, who wrote both first and second seasons of Stranger (2017–2020), participated as the creator. Directed by Park Gun-ho, and co-written by Hwang Ha-jung and Kim Sang-won. Studio Dragon, Ace Factory, and Higround co-managed the production. On November 1, 2023, actors and production team held its first script reading in Seoul. Park Sung-woong has been cast to appear in the series.

== Release ==
TVING announced that Dongjae, the Good or the Bastard would be released on its platform and on Paramount+ in 2024. The release date was confirmed to be on October 10, 2024, after TVING unveiled the first teaser video of the series. It would also broadcast on tvN on October 14, 2024, and would air every Monday and Tuesday at 21:00 (KST).

The series was invited as one of the six drama series in the On Screen section of the 29th Busan International Film Festival on October 2–11, 2024, where two out of 10 episodes had its world premiere.

== Viewership ==
Dongjae, the Good or the Bastard : South Korea viewers per episode (thousands)

Season	Episode number										Average
Season	1	2	3	4	5	6	7	8	9	10	Average
1	796	516	514	481	545	515	408	464	440	558	524

Source: Audience measurement performed nationwide by Nielsen Korea.

Average TV viewership ratings
Ep.	Original broadcast date	Average audience share (Nielsen Korea)	
Ep.	Original broadcast date	Nationwide	Seoul
1	October 14, 2024	3.766% (1st)	3.949% (1st)
2	October 15, 2024	2.885% (2nd)	3.249% (2nd)
3	October 21, 2024	2.546% (3rd)	2.696% (3rd)
4	October 22, 2024	2.281% (3rd)	2.545% (2nd)
5	October 28, 2024	2.620% (4th)	2.746% (3rd)
6	October 29, 2024	2.682% (2nd)	2.631% (2nd)
7	November 4, 2024	2.131% (2nd)	2.260% (2nd)
8	November 5, 2024	2.359% (2nd)	2.478% (2nd)
9	November 11, 2024	2.271% (2nd)	2.415% (2nd)
10	November 12, 2024	2.775% (1st)	3.121% (1st)
Average		2.632%	2.809%
In the table above, the blue numbers represent the lowest ratings and the red numbers represent the highest ratings.; This drama aired on a cable channel/pay TV which normally has a relatively smaller audience compared to free-to-air TV/public broadcasters (KBS, SBS, MBC, and EBS).

== Accolades ==
=== Awards and nominations ===
Award ceremony	Year	Category	Nominee	Result	Ref.
Baeksang Arts Awards	2025	Best Actor	Lee Joon-hyuk	Nominated	
Baeksang Arts Awards	2025	Best Supporting Actor	Hyeon Bong-sik	Nominated	

=== Listicles ===
Name of publisher, year listed, name of listicle, and placement
Publisher	Year	Listicle	Placement	Ref.
Cine21	2024	Top 10 Series of 2024	6th place	
