= Lee Joon-hyuk (actor, born 1984) =

South Korean actor (born 1984)

Lee Jun-hyuk
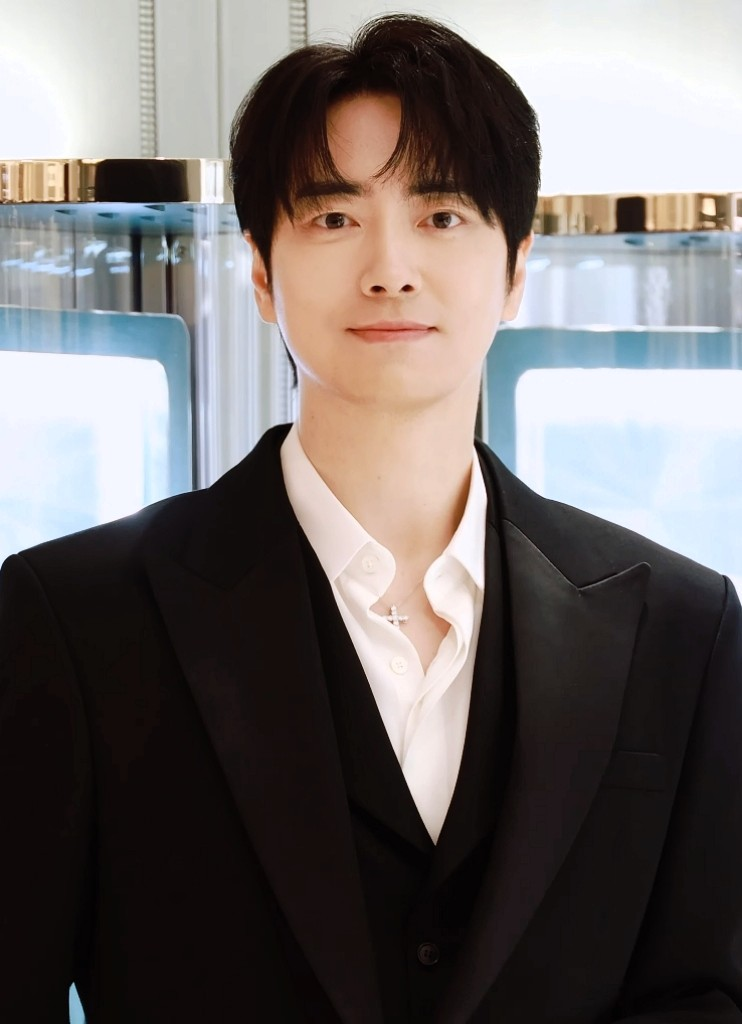
- Lee in 2025
- Born: March 13, 1984 (age 42); Seoul, South Korea
- Education: Hanshin University – Advertising and Public Relations; Dankook University – Performing Arts
- Occupation: Actor
- Years active: 2006–present
- Agent: Ace Factory

Korean name
- Hangul: 이준혁
- Hanja: 李浚赫
- RR: I Junhyeok
- MR: I Chunhyŏk

Lee Joon-hyuk (Korean: 이준혁; born March 13, 1984) is a South Korean actor. He is best known for his role as Seo Dong-jae in Stranger (2017–2020). His other notable works include Naked Fireman (2017), A Poem a Day (2018), Designated Survivor: 60 Days (2019), 365: Repeat the Year (2020), Dark Hole (2021), Vigilante (2023), and Love Scout (2025).

== Career ==
Lee made his entertainment debut in 2006 (January 20) by appearing in a music video by hip hop band Typhoon. He began acting in the 2007 television drama First Wives' Club, followed by a few supporting turns. Lee rise to popularity with his starring roles in Three Brothers (2009), I Am Legend (2010), City Hunter (2011), and Man from the Equator (2012).

In 2011, Lee appeared in Carried by the Wind, a reality show that aired as part of Sunday Night in which several male celebrities go on a road trip in the United States to learn about music. He also expanded his Korean Wave fan base by starring in the Chinese television drama Half a Fairytale in 2012.

Lee enlisted for his mandatory military service on June 19, 2012, and was discharged on March 18, 2014. He made his acting comeback in My Spring Days.

In 2017, Lee gained recognition with his roles in crime thriller Stranger and fantasy epic Along With the Gods: The Two Worlds. In 2018, Lee played the lead role in the medical drama A Poem a Day and the second lead role in the sci-fi drama Are You Human? In 2019, Lee joined the cast of the critically acclaimed tvN drama Designated Survivor: 60 Days and of the OCN drama The Lies Within. He also played the role of baseball coach Choi Jin-tae alongside Lee Joo-young in the independent film Baseball Girl, which premiered at the 24th Busan International Film Festival on October 4, 2019.

In 2020, Lee starred in the timetravel mystery thriller 365: Repeat the Year as a detective of a homicide team. That role brought him Best Acting Award at the 5th Asia Artist Awards, as well as Excellence Award (Actor in a Monday-Tuesday Miniseries) at the 39th MBC Drama Awards. Later that year he reprised his role of Seo Dong-jae in the second season of Stranger. In August 2020, Lee achieved 'Three-Civil-Servants' award of the year. In November 2020, Lee appointed as 'Honorary Firefighter' by the president of South Korea on '58th Firefighter Day's Celebration'. He was awarded this title for his generous donation of his full fee from Naked Fireman drama to 'South Korea Fire Service' and appearing in two firefighting-related projects.

In 2021, Lee starred in the OCN drama Dark Hole, had a cameo role in the tvN drama Secret Royal Inspector & Joy and is set to appear in Kwak Kyung-taek's film Firefighter. In 2021, Lee was featured on The Actor is Present – The Korean Actors 200 KOFIC campaign. His KOFIC biography tagline was "a generalist who meticulously plays selfishness, justice, and the extremes of human emotions".

In 2024, Lee starred opposite Park Sung-woong in the crime thriller legal television series Dongjae, the Good or the Bastard. The series is a spin-off of the Korean drama Stranger (2017).

In 2025, Lee starred in the SBS romance drama Love Scout opposite Han Ji-min. He played Yu Eun-ho, who is a single father. In the same year, he also had a special appearance in Netflix's action noir series Mercy for None. He then starred in Netflix's mystery thriller The Art of Sarah opposite Shin Hye-sun. He played Park Mu-gyeong, a Seoul Metropolitan Police Agency investigator. He also portrayed Grand Prince Geumseong in the historical film The King's Warden (2026).

In 2026, Lee is set to star in The Ordinary Jackpot and The Remarried Empress, which are both based on web-novels.

== Philanthropy ==
On December 6, 2022, Lee decided to donate all royalties to animal protection organizations right from the pre-publishing stage of Hello Popcorn.

== Filmography ==
=== Film ===
Key
†	Denotes films that have not yet been released

Year	Title	Role	Notes	Ref.
2009	Fortune Salon	Ho-joon		
2010	I Saw the Devil	NIS agent	Cameo	
2012	The Peach Tree	Chul-min	Cameo	
2016	Two Rooms, Two Nights	Cafe owner	Cameo	
2017	Along With the Gods: The Two Worlds	First lieutenant Park Moo-shin		
2018	Along with the Gods: The Last 49 Days	First lieutenant Park Moo-shin		
2019	No Mercy	Han Jung-woo		
2019	Baseball Girl	Choi Jin-tae		
2022	Reverse	Ryu Jun-ho	Sound film	
2023	The Roundup: No Way Out	Joo Seong-cheol		
2023	12.12: The Day	Kwon Hyung-jin	Cameo	
2024	The Firefighters	Song Ki-chul		
2026	The King's Warden	Grand Prince Geumseong / Yi Yu	Cameo	

=== Television series ===
Key
†	Denotes television productions that have not yet been released

Year	Title	Role	Notes	Ref.
2007	Drama City – "The Way Love Moves Us"	Seo Jung-woo	One act-drama	
2007–08	First Wives' Club	Han Sun-soo		
2008	Worlds Within	Kang Joon-ki		
2008–2009	Star's Lover	Min Jang-soo		
2009	The City Hall	Ha Soo-in		
2009–2010	Three Brothers	Kim Yi-sang		
2010	I Am Legend	Jang Tae-hyun		
2010	Secret Garden	Joon-hyuk	Cameo (Ep. 8)	
2011	City Hunter	Kim Young-joo		
2012	Man from the Equator	Lee Jang-il		
2012	Fairytale	Du Yu Feng	Chinese drama	
2014	My Spring Days	Kang Dong-wook		
2015	House of Bluebird	Kim Ji-wan		
2016	The Birth of a Married Woman	Kim Chul-soo		
2017	Naked Fireman	Kang Chul-soo		
2017–2020	Stranger	Seo Dong-jae	Season 1–2	
2017	Drama Stage – "Chief B and the Love Letter"		Cameo	
2017	JTBC Drama Festa – "Han Yeo-reum's Memory"	Park Hae-joon		
2018	A Poem a Day	Ye Jae-wook		
2018	Are You Human?	Ji Young-hoon		
2018	Life	Joo Nam-jeong	Cameo (Ep. 16)	
2019	Designated Survivor: 60 Days	Oh Young-seok		
2019	The Lies Within	Jeong Sang-hoon		
2020	365: Repeat the Year	Ji Hyeong-joo		
2021	Dark Hole	Yoo Tae-han		
2021	Secret Royal Inspector & Joy	Crown Prince Sohyeon		
2021	Our Beloved Summer	Jang Do-yul	Cameo	
2023	Vigilante	Jo Kang-ok		
2024	Dongjae, the Good or the Bastard	Seo Dong-jae	Stranger spin-off	
2025	Love Scout	Yoo Eun-ho		
2025	Mercy for None	Nam Gi-seok	Special appearance	
2026	The Art of Sarah	Park Mu-gyeong		
2026	The Ordinary Jackpot	Gong Eun-tae		

=== Television shows ===
Year	Title	Notes	Ref.
2011	Sunday Night: Carried by the Wind	Cast member	

=== Hosting ===
Year	Event	Notes	Ref.
2021	Closing ceremony 26th Busan International Film Festival	with Lee Joo-young	

=== Music video appearances ===
Year	Song title	Artist	Ref.
2006	"I Will Wait" (기다릴게)	Typhoon	
2010	"Love Bear" (사랑 곰)	KCM	

== Discography ==
Soundtrack appearances
Year	Song title	With	Album
2010	"You" (그대가)	—N/a	I Am Legend Soundtrack
2010	"You" (그대가) (Duet Ver.)	Kim Jung-eun	I Am Legend Soundtrack
2011	"Like an Indian Doll" (인디언 인형처럼)	Nuck	Carried by the Wind Project Part 8

== Accolades ==
=== Awards and nominations ===
Name of the award ceremony, year presented, category, nominee of the award, and the result of the nomination
Award ceremony	Year	Category	Nominee / Work	Result	Ref.
Asia Artist Awards	2020	Best Acting Award	365: Repeat the Year; Stranger 2	Won	
Asia Artist Awards	2025	Legendary Actor	Lee Joon-hyuk	Won	
Baeksang Arts Awards	2025	Best Actor – Television	Dongjae, the Good or the Bastard	Nominated	
Blue Dragon Film Awards	2023	Best Supporting Actor	The Roundup: No Way Out	Nominated	
Blue Dragon Series Awards	2025	Tirtir Popularity Award	Dongjae, the Good or the Bastard	Won	
Blue Dragon Series Awards	2025	Best Actor	Dongjae, the Good or the Bastard	Nominated	
Korea Broadcasting Prizes	2025	Best Actor	Love Scout	Won	
Korea Drama Awards	2019	Excellence Award, Actor	Designated Survivor: 60 Days	Nominated	
KBS Drama Awards	2009	Excellence Award, Actor in a Serial Drama	Three Brothers	Nominated	
KBS Drama Awards	2009	Best Couple (with Oh Ji-eun)	Three Brothers	Nominated	
KBS Drama Awards	2012	Excellence Award, Actor in a Mid-length Drama	Man from the Equator	Nominated	
KBS Drama Awards	2015	Excellence Award, Actor in a Serial Drama	House of Bluebird	Nominated	
KBS Drama Awards	2018	Excellence Award, Actor in a Mid-Length Drama	Are You Human?	Nominated	
MBC Drama Awards	2020	Excellence Award, Actor in a Monday-Tuesday Miniseries	365: Repeat the Year	Won	
SBS Drama Awards	2008	New Star Award	First Wives' Club	Won	
SBS Drama Awards	2011	Excellence Award, Actor in a Drama Special	City Hunter	Nominated	
SBS Drama Awards	2025	Top Excellence Award, Actor in a Seasonal Drama	Love Scout	Won	

=== State and cultural honors ===
Name of country or organization, year given, and name of honor
Country or organization	Year	Honor	Ref.
Newsis K-Expo Cultural Awards (Note: Co-sponsored by Korea's Ministry of Culture, Sports and Tourism, Ministry of Trade, Industry, and Energy, Korea Communications Commission, and Korea Creative Content Agency, it awards cultural icons and businesses that promote the sustainability of the Korean Wave and boost the industry's competitiveness.)	2025	National Assembly's Culture, Sports and Tourism Committee Award	

=== Listicles ===
Name of publisher, year listed, name of listicle, and placement
Publisher	Year	Listicle	Placement	Ref.
Korean Film Council	2021	Korean Actors 200 (Note: Introduces 200 actors that best represent the present and future of Korean cinema to the people in the film industry all over the world.)	Included	
Moviewalker Press	2024	10 Korean Actors that Movie Writers Recommended in 2024	Top 10	
