= List of South Korean films of 2022 =

The following is a list of South Korean films released in 2022.

== Box office ==
The highest-grossing South Korean films released in 2022, by domestic box office gross revenue, are as follows:

Highest-grossing films released in 2022
Rank	Title	Distributor	Domestic gross
1	The Roundup	ABO Entertainment	$103,956,897
2	Hansan: Rising Dragon	Lotte Cultureworks	$58,353,635
3	Confidential Assignment 2: International	CJ Entertainment	$56,149,131
4	Hunt	Megabox Plus M	$35,313,446
5	The Night Owl	Next Entertainment World	$26,550,336
6	Hero	CJ Entertainment	$24,592,233
7	The Witch: Part 2. The Other One	Next Entertainment World	$22,954,356
8	Emergency Declaration	Showbox	$16,924,677
9	6/45	Cinnamon HC, Sidus	$16,005,796
10	Decision to Leave	CJ Entertainment	$15,885,396

== Released ==
=== January–March ===
Opening		English title	Native title	Director(s)	Cast	Ref.
J A N U A R Y	5	The Policeman's Lineage	경관의 피	Lee Kyu-man	Cho Jin-woong, Choi Woo-shik	
J A N U A R Y	12	Special Delivery	특송	Park Dae-min	Park So-dam, Song Sae-byeok	
J A N U A R Y	26	Kingmaker	킹메이커	Byun Sung-Hyun	Sul Kyung-gu, Lee Sun-kyun	
J A N U A R Y	26	The Pirates: The Last Royal Treasure	해적: 도깨비 깃발	Kim Jeong-hoon	Kang Ha-neul, Han Hyo-joo, Lee Kwang-soo, Kwon Sang-woo	
F E B R U A R Y	11	Love and Leashes	모럴센스	Park Hyun-jin	Seohyun, Lee Jun-young	
F E B R U A R Y	23	Serve the People	인민을 위해 복무하라	Jang Cheol-soo	Yeon Woo-jin, Ji-an, Jo Seong-ha	
M A R C H	9	In Our Prime	이상한 나라의 수학자	Park Dong-hoon	Choi Min-sik, Kim Dong-hwi, Park Byung-eun, Park Hae-joon, Jo Yoon-seo	
M A R C H	23	Hot Blooded	뜨거운 피	Chun Myeong-gwan	Lee Hong-nae, Choi Moo-sung, Jung Woo, Kim Kap-soo, Ji Seung-hyun	

=== April–June ===
Opening		English title	Native title	Director(s)	Cast	Ref.
A P R I L	7	The Girl on a Bulldozer	불도저에 탄 소녀	Park Yi-woong	Kim Hye-yoon, Park Hyuk-kwon, Oh Man-seok	
A P R I L	8	Yaksha: Ruthless Operations	야차	Na Hyeon	Sul Kyung-gu, Park Hae-soo, Yang Dong-keun	
A P R I L	20	Anchor	앵커	Jung Ji-yeon	Chun Woo-hee, Shin Ha-kyun, Lee Hye-young	
A P R I L	21	The Novelist's Film	소설가의 영화	Hong Sang-soo	Lee Hye-young, Kim Min-hee	
A P R I L	22	Air Murder	공기살인	Jo Yong-sun	Kim Sang-kyung, Seo Young-hee, Lee Sun-bin	
A P R I L	27	Urban Myths	서울괴담	Hong Won-ki	Kim Do-yoon, Lee Yul-eum, Lee Young-jin, Lee Su-min	
A P R I L	27	I Want to Know Your Parents	니 부모 얼굴이 보고 싶다	Kim Ji-hoon	Sul Kyung-gu, Sung Yoo-bin, Chun Woo-hee, Kim Hong-pa	
A P R I L	27	When Spring Comes	봄날	Lee Don-ku	Son Hyun-joo, Park Hyuk-kwon, Jung Seok-yong, Son Sook, Park So-jin, Jung Ji-hwan	
A P R I L	28	Boogie Nights	부기나이트	Kim Kyung-yeop	Choi Gwi-hwa, Kim Hee-jung	
M A Y	11	Piggy Back	어부바	Choi Jong-hak	Jung Joon-ho, Choi Dae-chul	
M A Y	18	The Roundup	범죄도시2	Lee Sang-yong	Ma Dong-seok, Son Seok-koo	
M A Y	25	Good Morning	안녕하세요	Cha Bong-joo	Kim Hwan-hee, Yoo Sun, Lee Soon-jae, Song Jae-rim	
M A Y	26	Hommage	오마주	Shin Su-won	Lee Jung-eun, Kwon Hae-hyo, Tang Jun-sang, Lee Joo-shil	
J U N E	1	Cassiopeia	카시오페아	Shin Yeon-shick	Ahn Sung-ki, Seo Hyun-jin, Joo Ye-rim	
J U N E	8	Broker	브로커	Hirokazu Kore-eda	Song Kang-ho, Gang Dong-won, Bae Doona, Lee Ji-eun	
J U N E	8	2037	이공삼칠	Mo Hong-jin	Hong Ye-ji, Kim Ji-young, Kim Mi-hwa, Hwang Seok-jeong	
J U N E	15	The Witch: Part 2. The Other One	마녀2	Park Hoon-jung	Shin Si-ah, Jo Min-su, Park Eun-bin	
J U N E	16	Mother and Daughter	경아의 딸	Kim Jong-un	Kim Jung-young, Ha Yun-kyung, Kim Woo-gyeom, Park Hye-jin	
J U N E	22	My Perfect Roommate	룸 쉐어링	Lee Soon-sung	Na Moon-hee, Choi Woo-sung	
J U N E	29	Decision to Leave	헤어질 결심	Park Chan-wook	Tang Wei, Park Hae-il	

=== July–September ===
Opening		English title	Native title	Director(s)	Cast	Ref.
J U L Y	13	The Killer: A Girl Who Deserves to Die	더 킬러: 죽어도 되는 아이	Choi Jae-hoon	Jang Hyuk	
J U L Y	20	Alienoid	외계+인 1부	Choi Dong-hoon	Ryu Jun-yeol, Kim Woo-bin, Kim Tae-ri, So Ji-sub	
J U L Y	27	Hansan: Rising Dragon	한산: 용의 출현	Kim Han-min	Park Hae-il, Byun Yo-han	
A U G U S T	3	Emergency Declaration	비상선언	Han Jae-rim	Song Kang-ho, Lee Byung-hun, Jeon Do-yeon, Kim Nam-gil, Im Si-wan	
A U G U S T	5	Carter	카터	Jung Byung-gil	Joo Won, Lee Sung-jae	
A U G U S T	10	Hunt	헌트	Lee Jung-jae	Lee Jung-jae, Jung Woo-sung	
A U G U S T	24	6/45	육사오	Park Gyu-tae	Go Kyung-pyo, Lee Yi-kyung	
A U G U S T	26	Seoul Vibe	서울대작전	Moon Hyun-sung	Yoo Ah-in, Go Kyung-pyo, Lee Kyu-hyung, Park Ju-hyun, Ong Seong-wu	
A U G U S T	31	Limit	리미트	Lee Seung-Jun	Lee Jung-hyun, Moon Jeong-hee, Jin Seo-yeon	
A U G U S T	31	Semantic Error: The Movie	시맨틱 에러: 더 무비	Kim Su-jeong	Park Seo-ham, Park Jae-chan, Song Ji-oh	
S E P T E M B E R	7	Confidential Assignment 2: International	공조2: 인터내셔날	Lee Suk-hoon	Hyun Bin, Yoo Hae-jin, Im Yoon-ah, Daniel Henney, Jin Seon-kyu	
S E P T E M B E R	15	Oh! My Ghost	오! 마이 고스트	Hong Tae-sun	Jeong Jinwoon, Ahn Seo-hyun, Lee Joo-yeon, Jeon Soo-jin	
S E P T E M B E R	21	Project Wolf Hunting	늑대사냥	Kim Hong-sun	Seo In-guk, Jang Dong-yoon, Sung Dong-il	
S E P T E M B E R	21	Thunderbird	썬더버드	Lee Jae-won	Lee Seol, Seo Hyun-woo, Lee Myeong-ro	
S E P T E M B E R	28	Honest Candidate 2	정직한 후보2	Jang Yu-jeong	Ra Mi-ran, Kim Mu-yeol, Yoon Kyung-ho, Park Jin-joo	
S E P T E M B E R	28	Life Is Beautiful	인생은 아름다워	Choi Kook-hee	Yum Jung-ah, Ryu Seung-ryong, Park Se-wan, Ong Seong-wu	

=== October–December ===
Opening		English title	Native title	Director(s)	Cast	Ref.
O C T O B E R	5	Come Back Home	컴백홈	Lee Yeon-woo	Ra Mi-ran, Song Sae-byeok, Lee Beom-soo	
O C T O B E R	5	Transaction Complete	거래완료	Cho Kyung-ho	Jeon Seok-ho, Tae In-ho, Choi Ye-bin	
O C T O B E R	21	20th Century Girl	20세기 소녀	Bang Woo-ri	Kim Yoo-jung, Byeon Woo-seok, Park Jung-woo, Roh Yoon-seo	
O C T O B E R	26	Confession	자백	Yoon Jong-seok	So Ji-sub, Kim Yunjin, Nana	
O C T O B E R	26	Remember	리멤버	Lee Il-hyung	Lee Sung-min, Nam Joo-hyuk	
N O V E M B E R	2	The Highway Family	고속도로 가족	Lee Sang-moon	Ra Mi-ran, Jung Il-woo, Kim Seul-gi, Baek Hyun-jin	
N O V E M B E R	3	Walk Up	탑	Hong Sang-soo	Kwon Hae-hyo, Lee Hye-young	
N O V E M B E R	16	Ditto	동감	Seo Eun-young	Yeo Jin-goo, Cho Yi-hyun, Kim Hye-yoon, Na In-woo	
N O V E M B E R	16	Decibel	데시벨	Hwang In-ho	Kim Rae-won, Lee Jong-suk, Jung Sang-hoon, Park Byung-eun	
N O V E M B E R	23	The Night Owl	올빼미	Ahn Tae-jin	Ryu Jun-yeol, Yoo Hae-jin	
N O V E M B E R	24	When Winter Comes	창밖은 겨울	Lee Sang-jin	Kwak Min-gyu, Han Sun-hwa	
N O V E M B E R	30	Men of Plastic	압꾸정	Lim Jin-sun	Ma Dong-seok, Jung Kyung-ho, Oh Na-ra, Choi Byung-mo	
D E C E M B E R	7	A Christmas Carol	크리스마스 캐럴	Kim Seong Soo	Park Jin-young, Kim Young-min, Kim Dong-hwi, Heo Dong-won	
D E C E M B E R	14	The Haunted House: The Dimensional Goblin and the Seven Worlds	신비아파트 극장판 차원도깨비와 7개의 세계	Byun Young-kyu	Jo Hyeon-jeong, Kim Young-eun, Kim Chae-ha, Kang Sae-bom, Yang Jeong-hwa	
D E C E M B E R	21	Hero	영웅	Yoon Je-kyoon	Jung Sung-hwa, Kim Go-eun	
D E C E M B E R	28	Gentleman	젠틀맨	Kim Kyung-won	Ju Ji-hoon, Park Sung-woong	

== See also ==
- List of 2022 box office number-one films in South Korea
- 2022 in South Korea
- Impact of the COVID-19 pandemic on cinema
