= Park Myung-hoon =

South Korean actor (born 1975)

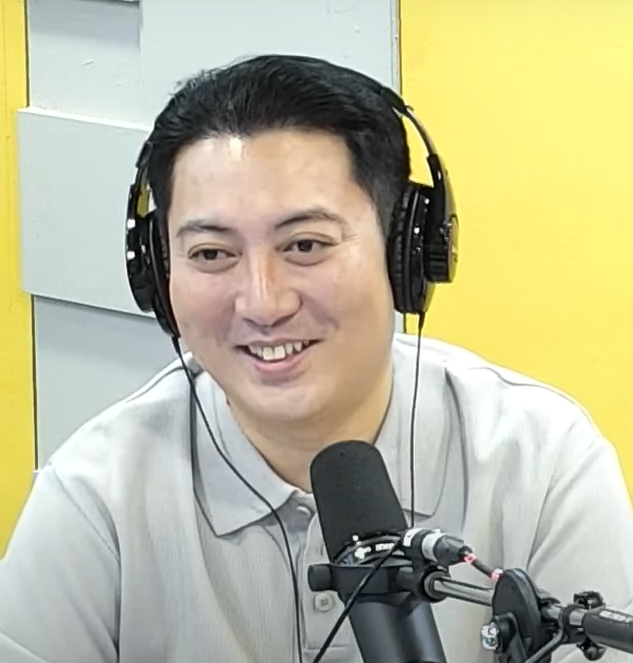
- Park in August 2022
- Born: May 28, 1975 (age 51); Busan, South Korea
- Occupation: Actor
- Years active: 1999–present
- Agent: KeyEast

Korean name
- Hangul: 박명훈
- RR: Bak Myeonghun
- MR: Pak Myŏnghun

Park Myung-hoon (Korean: 박명훈; born May 28, 1975), is a South Korean actor. He made his acting debut as a stage actor in the 1999 play Class. He is best known internationally for his role as Geun-sae in the Academy Award winning film Parasite.

== Filmography ==
=== Film ===
Year	Title	Role	Notes/Ref.
2015	Alive	Myung-hoon	
2016	Steel Flower	Seafood restaurant owner	
2017	Ash Flower	Myong-ho	
2019	Parasite	Oh Geun-sae	
2020	Deliver Us From Evil	Shimda	
2021	Voice	general manager Chun	
2021	Sana-Hee Pure	Won-Bo	
2022	The Policeman's Lineage	Cha Dong-cheol	
2022	Limit	Jun-yong	
2022	The Night Owl	Man-sik	
2023	Dream	A reporter	Special appearance
2023	Dr. Cheon and Lost Talisman	Husband	Special appearance
2023	Noryang: Deadly Sea	Moriatsu	
2023	Our Season		
2025	Only God Knows Everything	Shim Gwang-woon	
2026	Portrait of a Family	Wang Byun	
2027	The Sword: Rebirth of the Red Wolf	Pung-sa	
TBA	Seeking the King	Gwan-u	

=== Television series ===
Year	Title	Role	Notes	Ref.
2019–2020	Crash Landing on You	Go Myeong-seok		
2022	Eve	Kang Si-gyeom		
2026	Sword & Silence	Heo Kyung-jong		

=== Television shows ===
Year	Title	Role	Notes	Ref.
2023	Europe Outside the Tent	Cast Member	Season 2	

=== Web series ===
Year	Title	Role	Ref.
2022	Money Heist: Korea – Joint Economic Area	Jo Young-min	
2023	Bait	Song Young-jin	
TBA	80 Billion Boy		

== Awards and nominations ==
Year	Award	Category	Nominated work	Result
2017	5th Wildflower Film Awards	Best Supporting Actor	Ash Flower	Nominated
2019	24h Chunsa Film Art Awards	Best Supporting Actor	Parasite	Nominated
2019	28th Buil Film Awards	Best Supporting Actor	Parasite	Won
2019	40th Blue Dragon Film Awards	Best Supporting Actor	Parasite	Nominated
2020	25th Critics' Choice Awards	Best Acting Ensemble	Parasite	Nominated
2020	2020 Gold Derby Awards	Best Ensemble	Parasite	Won
2020	26th Screen Actors Guild Awards	Outstanding Performance by a Cast in a Motion Picture	Parasite	Won
2020	56th Baeksang Arts Awards	Best New Actor	Parasite	Won
2020	56th Baeksang Arts Awards	Best Supporting Actor	Parasite	Nominated
