= Yi Sun-sin trilogy =

South Korean film trilogy by Kim Han-min based on battles led by Admiral Yi Sun-sin

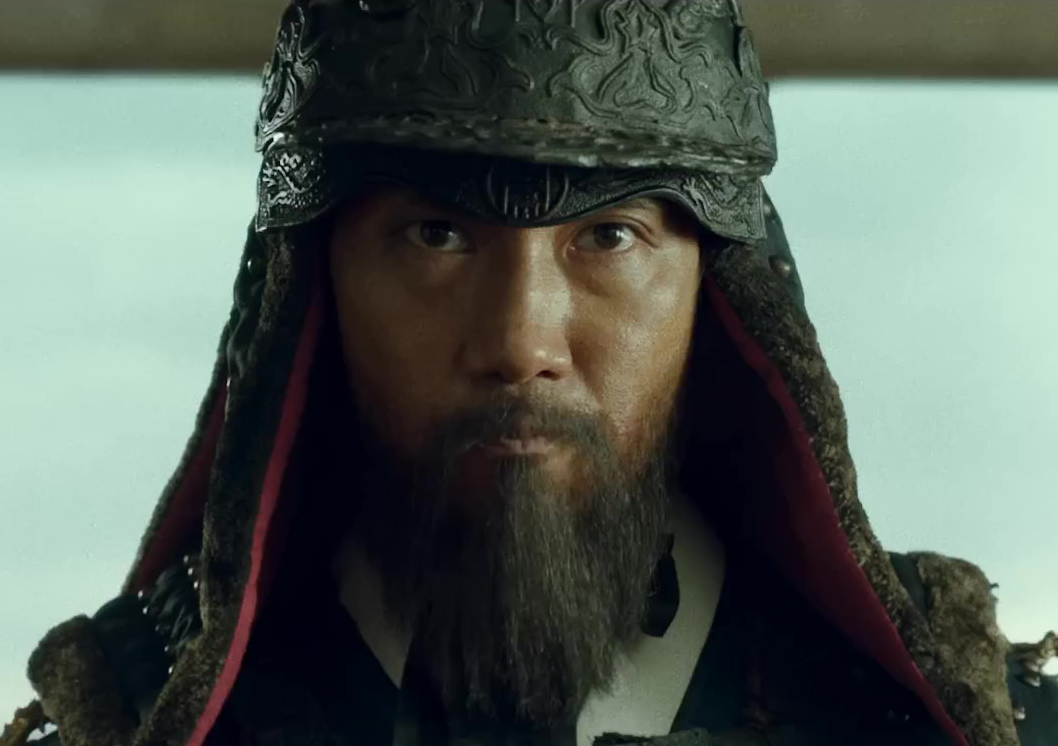
- Park Hae-il as Yi Sun-sin in Hansan: Rising Dragon (2022)
- Hangul: 이순신 3부작
- RR: I Sunsin 3bujak
- MR: I Sunsin 3pujak
- Directed by: Kim Han-min
- Screenplay by: Kim Han-min; Jeon Chul-hong (1)
- Cinematography: Kim Tae-seong
- Edited by: Kim Chang-ju (1); Lee Gang-hui (2); An Hyeon-geon (2)
- Music by: Kim Tae-seong
- Production company: Big Stone Pictures
- Release dates: July 30, 2014 (The Admiral: Roaring Currents); July 27, 2022 (Hansan: Rising Dragon); December 20, 2023 (Noryang: Deadly Sea)
- Country: South Korea
- Languages: Korean; Japanese; Mandarin

The Yi Sun-sin trilogy (Korean: 이순신 3부작) is a South Korean period war action film series directed by Kim Han-min based on three major naval battles led by Admiral Yi Sun-sin. The first film The Admiral: Roaring Currents (2014) is based on Battle of Myeongnyang (1597), the second Hansan: Rising Dragon (2022) depicts Battle of Hansan Island (1592) and the last film Noryang: Deadly Sea (2023) is based on Battle of Noryang (1598).

== Overview ==
Title	Release date (South Korea)	Running time	Budget	Distributor
The Admiral: Roaring Currents	July 30, 2014	127 minutes	₩14.8 billion	CJ Entertainment
Hansan: Rising Dragon	July 27, 2022	129 minutes	₩31.2 billion	Lotte Entertainment
Noryang: Deadly Sea	December 20, 2023	153 minutes	₩31.2 billion	Lotte Entertainment

== Cast ==
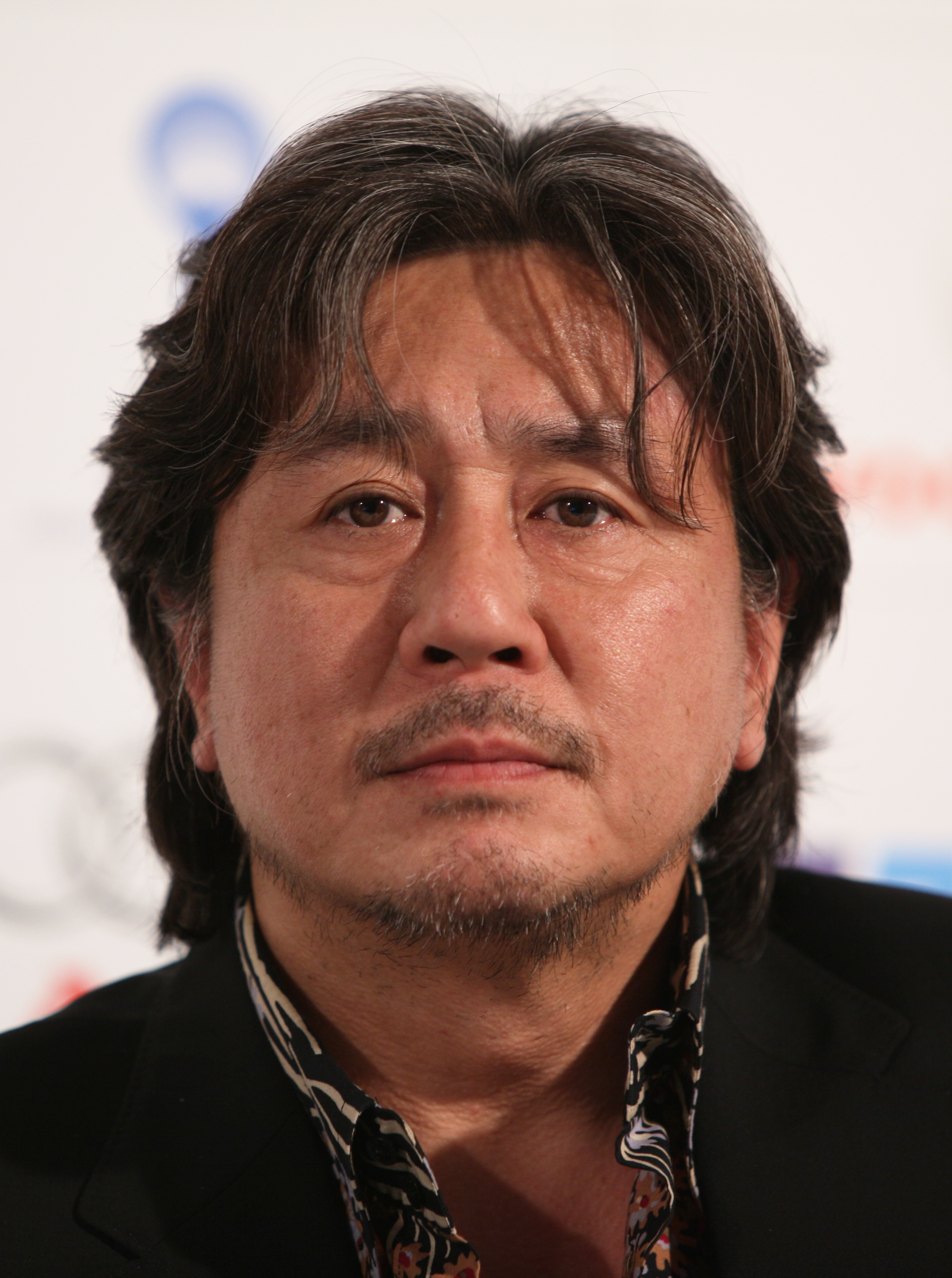
Choi Min-sik portrayed 52-year-old Yi in The Admiral (2014).

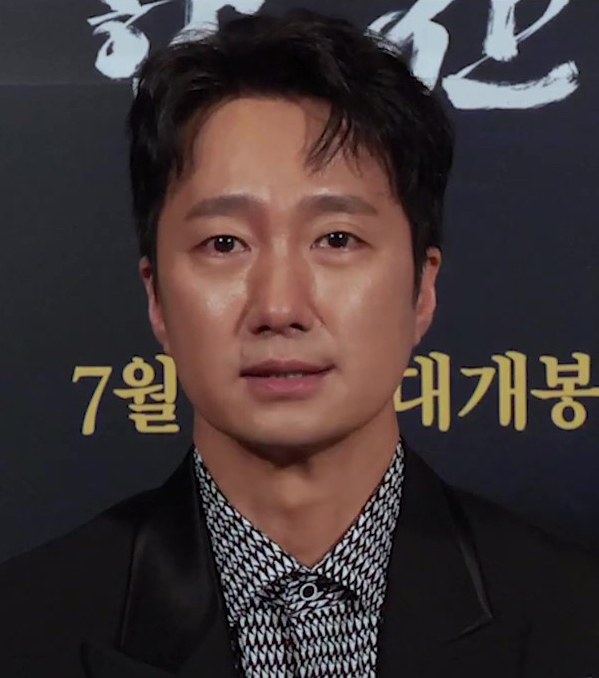
Park Hae-il portrayed 47-year-old Yi in Hansan (2022).

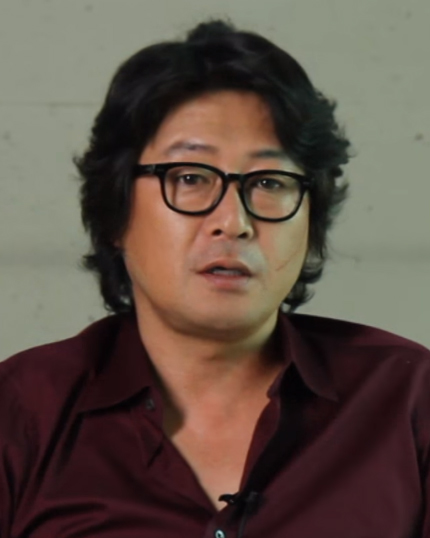
Kim Yoon-seok portrays 53-year-old Yi in Noryang: Deadly Sea (2023).

Characters	Films		
Characters	The Admiral: Roaring Currents	Hansan: Rising Dragon	Noryang: Deadly Sea
Characters	2014	2022	2023
Yi Sun-sin	Choi Min-sik	Park Hae-il	Kim Yoon-seok
Wakisaka Yasuharu	Cho Jin-woong	Byun Yo-han	
Lim Jun-young	Jin Goo	Ok Taec-yeon	
Junsa	Ryohei Otani	Kim Sung-kyu	Kim Sung-kyu
Katō Yoshiaki	Kim Kang-il	Kim Sung-kyun	

== Development ==
In 2013, while producing The Admiral: Roaring Currents, Big Stone Pictures revealed their plans to produce two more films related to Yi Sun-sin, titled Emergence of Hansan Dragon and Noryang: Deadly Sea as sequels, depending on the success of The Admiral. Following the box office success of The Admiral which became the most-watched and highest-grossing film of all time in South Korea, production of the sequels was confirmed.

According to director Kim, the charm of Admiral Yi Sun-sin has left him spellbound and inspired him to make a film trilogy about one of Korea's most celebrated historical figures. In a statement in July 2022, Kim explained the different characteristics depicted in the three films:

"The three naval battles differ in their characteristics. The Battle of Hansan Island demonstrated Admiral Yi's wisdom; the Battle of Myeongnyang demonstrated his courage; and the Battle of Noryang demonstrated his insight...capturing these three facets of his character was a great challenge and also an honor.

— Kim Ha-min

== Films ==
=== The Admiral: Roaring Currents (2014) ===
Based on historical Battle of Myeongnyang (1597), The Admiral narrates the against-the-odds triumph over Japanese navy. The film focused on Yi's planning for the battle and the swashbuckling naval clash. 61 minutes of its naval battle between 12 vessels of the Korean navy led by Yi and 330 invading Japanese ships, captivated the audience and was praised by the critics. The film attracted 17 million moviegoers becoming the most-viewed and highest-grossing film of all time in South Korea. (Note: In 2019 Extreme Job broke The Admiral's record for the highest-grossing South Korean film. But as of July 2022, The Admiral is still the most viewed South Korean film of all the time.) It also became a box-office hit internationally and grossed US$138.3 million worldwide.

=== Hansan: Rising Dragon (2022) ===
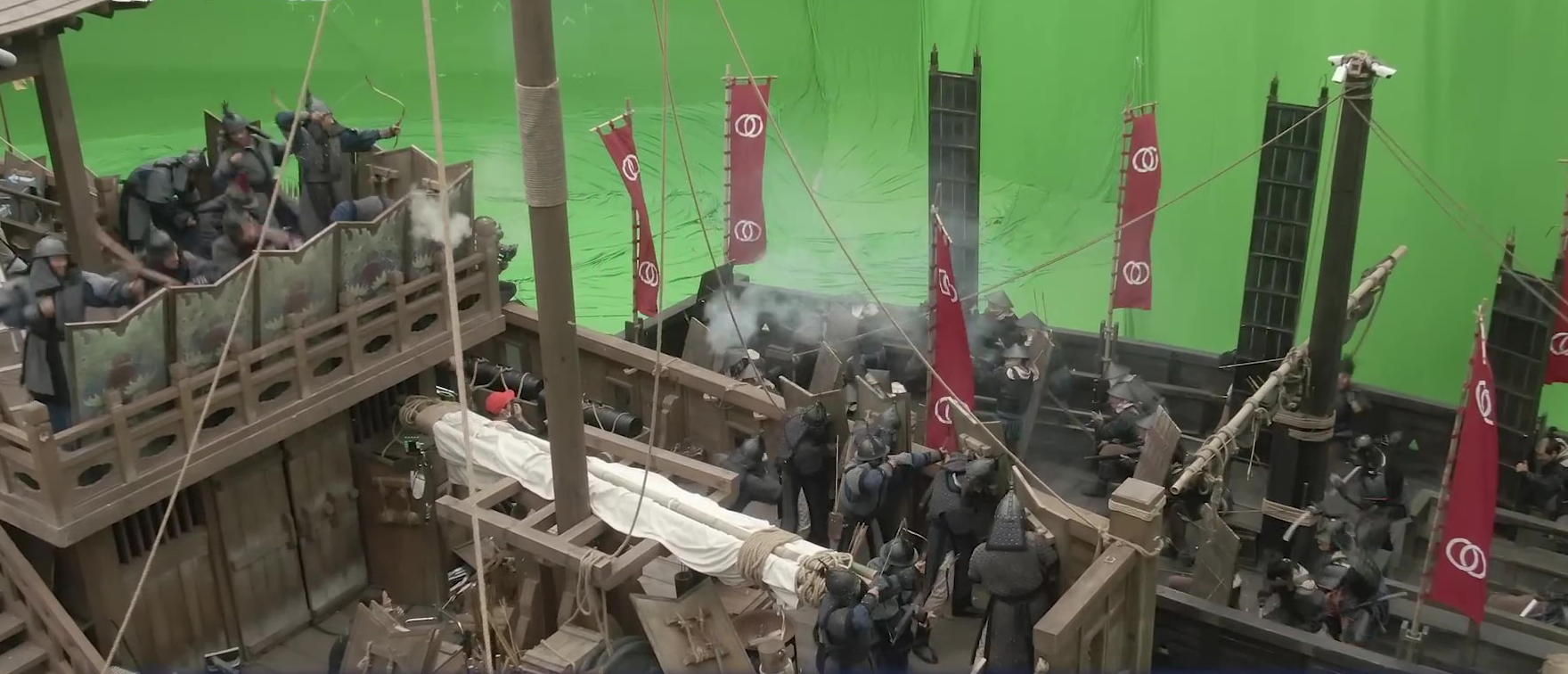
VFX filming set of Hansan

Hansan depicts the historical Battle of Hansan Island which took place five years before Battle of Myeongnyang depicted in The Admiral. The naval battle scenes which takes 51 minutes of screentime in the Hansan were shot using visual effects, unlike the previous film The Admiral which was actually filmed in a boat floating on the sea. It was released on 2,223 screens on July 27, 2022 in South Korea. It became the 2nd highest-grossing Korean film of 2022 with 7.26 million admissions.

=== Noryang: Deadly Sea (2023) ===
The film is about the Battle of Noryang. It was released on December 20, 2023.
