= Kim Sung-gyu =

Kim Sung-gyu is a Korean name consisting of the family name Kim and the given name Sung-gyu, and may also refer to:

- Kim Sung-kyu (born 1989), South Korean singer known as Sunggyu
- Kim Sung-kyu (actor) (born 1986), South Korean actor
- Kim Sung-gyu, a North Korean footballer who competed at the 1976 Summer Olympics.
