= The Sword: Rebirth of the Red Wolf =

Upcoming film by Kim Han-min

- Teaser poster
- Hangul: 칼: 고두막한의 검
- Lit.: Sword: The Blade of Godumak-han
- RR: Kal: godumakhanui geom
- MR: K'al: kodumakhanŭi kŏm
- Directed by: Kim Han-min
- Starring: Park Bo-gum; Joo Won; Trấn Thành; Jung Jae-young; Lee Sun-bin
- Production companies: Bigstone Pictures; Bluefire Studio
- Distributed by: Redice Entertainment
- Release date: 2027
- Country: South Korea
- Language: Korean

The Sword: Rebirth of the Red Wolf (Korean: 칼: 고두막한의 검) is an upcoming South Korean historical action film directed by Kim Han-min and starring Park Bo-gum, Joo Won, Trấn Thành, Jung Jae-young, and Lee Sun-bin. The film centers on Chil-seong, a former Goguryeo warrior who has been reduced to a slave after losing his memory. Distributed by Redice Entertainment, it is scheduled for a theatrical release in South Korea in the summer of 2027.

== Premise ==
Set in 668 AD, shortly after the fall of Goguryeo, Chil-seong is forced into a brutal gladiatorial tournament where 16 different tribes—including the Khitan, Mohe, and Göktürks—compete for the "Sword of Godumak-han", a legendary relic viewed as a symbol of hope for the displaced Goguryeo people. As he navigates the bloody competition, Chil-seong is mentored by Heuk Su-gang, the leader of Goguryeo Restoration Army, and eventually reclaiming his identity as a hero known as the "Red Wolf".

== Cast ==
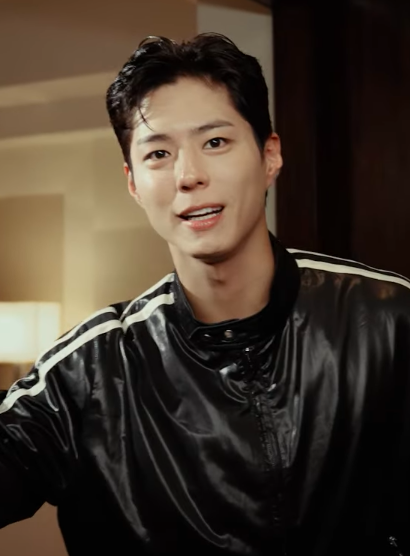
Park Bo-gum plays the title character "Red Wolf"

- Park Bo-gum as Chil-seong, a former Goguryeo warrior held as a slave gladiator and after losing his memory, he eventually adopts the identity of the "Red Wolf"
- Joo Won as Gyepil Ha-ryeok, a warrior representing the Göktürks and a rival to Chil-seong
- Trấn Thành as Sol In-gwi, the commander of the Andong Protectorate under the Tang dynasty
- Jung Jae-young as Heuk Su-gang, the leader of the Goguryeo Restoration Army and Chil-seong's mentor
- Lee Sun-bin as Maya, a member of the Goguryeo Restoration Army
- Kim Hyeong-seo as In-jeong, the daughter of Su-gang
- Kim Jae-chul as Ya-yul, a strategist for the Khitan
- Choi Gwi-hwa as Daeha Jinchung, a leader within the Khitan tribe
- Park Myung-hoon as Pung-sa, a former gatekeeper at Liaodong Fortress
- Lee Soon-won as Jeok In-geol, a strategist under In-gwi who manages the gladiatorial tournament
- Lydia Park as Tangri, a Mongol shaman

== Production ==
=== Development ===
Director Kim Han-min, best known for his Yi Sun-sin trilogy, officially announced the project during the "Plus M X SLL Night" event held in Busan on October 4, 2024. The film, titled Sword: The Blade of Godumak-han, initially set two years after the fall of Pyongyang Fortress in Goguryeo. Kim described the narrative as a "desperate sword-fighting epic" centered on a memory-impaired warrior who enters a conflict involving five different tribes to claim the legendary "Sword of Godumak-han". During the announcement, Kim stated that the production aims to deliver a "unique" style of historical action choreography. The production is a collaboration between Bigstone Pictures and Bluefire Studio, with Redice Entertainment serving as the primary investor and distributor.

=== Casting ===
The casting process for the film saw several high-profile developments between 2024 and 2026. In March 2025, Park Bo-gum was reported to lead the film, marking his second collaboration with director Kim following his minor role in the 2014 hit The Admiral: Roaring Currents. Ten months later, Joo Won was cast and marks his first historical film in nearly a decade. While Kim Hyeong-seo would make a special appearance. Bigstone Pictures finalized the official lineup in January 2026, with the addition of Jung Jae-young and Lee Sun-bin.

While Cha Seung-won was initially in talks for a major role, his casting fell through when the production schedule was pushed back from its original August 2024 start date. Following Cha's departure, the role was reportedly taken over by Vietnamese actor Trấn Thành.

=== Filming ===
Principal photography began on March 3, 2026. While early production schedules had aimed for a start date in January 2026, the project officially entered production in early May. Ahead of the start of filming, the production team conducted an "activity reading" session on March 9. Departing from traditional table reads, this rehearsal involved the cast and crew coordinating dialogue alongside physical action sequences and blocking. During these sessions, lead actors Park and Joo practiced high-difficulty sword choreography, with Joo specifically utilizing twin swords for his role.

=== Marketing ===
Bigstone Pictures unveiled the first global teaser posters for the film on May 7, 2026, signaling the start of a worldwide promotional campaign. The teaser features a close-up of Park Bo-gum as Chil-seong, capturing a pivotal moment of "awakening" where the character begins to reclaim his identity after living as an amnesiac slave. The promotional art confirmed the official English title as The Sword: Rebirth of the Red Wolf.

== Release ==
The Sword: Rebirth of the Red Wolf is scheduled for a theatrical release in South Korea in the summer of 2027. The production team has also confirmed plans for a global rollout, with a particular focus on Japan and Vietnam. This international push is reflected in the casting of Trấn Thành, intended to broaden the film's reach across the Asian market.
