= Jeong Ha-dam =

South Korean actress (born 1994)

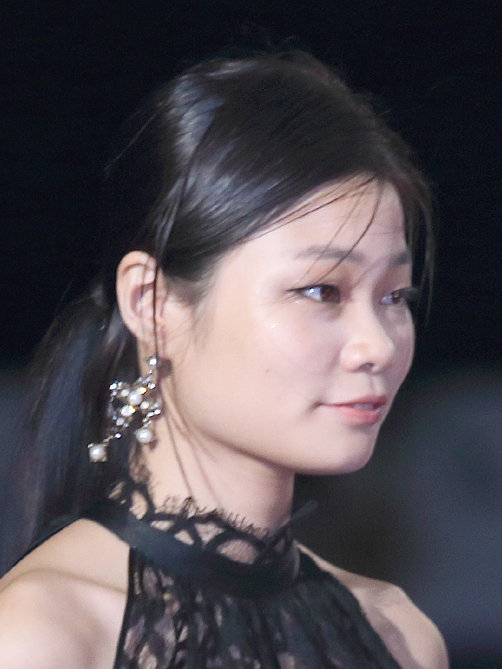
- Born: February 28, 1994 (age 32); Seoul, South Korea
- Occupation: Actress
- Years active: 2015–present
- Agent: Ghost Studio

Korean name
- Hangul: 정하담
- Hanja: 丁夏潭
- RR: Jeong Hadam
- MR: Chŏng Hadam

Jeong Ha-dam (Korean: 정하담; born February 28, 1994) is a South Korean actress. Jeong debuted with a lead role in Wild Flowers (2015). Her second lead role was in Steel Flower (2016), in which she was praised for her outstanding performance by Variety. She was awarded the Rising Star Awards to recognize new actors and actresses who have contributed to the film industry at the 2016 Max Movie Awards.

== Filmography ==
=== Film ===
Year	Title	Role	Notes/Ref.
2015	The Priests	Shaman Young-joo	
2015	Wild Flowers	Ha-dam	
2015	First of People		Short film
2016	Steel Flower	Ha-dam	
2016	Fly		Short film
2016	The Handmaiden	Maid 5	
2016	The Age of Shadows	Hanako	
2016	The Net	Jin Dal-rae	
2017	Oh, God!		Short film
2017	Ash Flower	Ha-dam	
2018	Dawn to Dawn	Ji-soo	Short film
2018	Herstory	Rental apartment newlywed bride	Special appearance
2019	A Resistance	Lee Ok-yi	
2020	Light for the Youth		Short film
2022	Decision to Leave	Oh Ga-in	
2024	Idiot Girls and School Ghost: School Anniversary	Min-joo	
TBA	Things You Don't Know		

=== Television show ===
Year	Network	Title	Role
2017	OCN	Bad Guys 2	Kim Yoon-kyung
2018	MBC	Tempted	Ko Kyung-joo
2020	SBS	The King: Eternal Monarch	Yu Jeong-hwa
2020	Netflix	Sweet Home	Kim Ji-eun
2024	TVING	Pyramid Game	

=== As script editor ===
Year	Title	Notes
2015	Wild Flowers	

== Accolades ==
=== Awards and nominations ===
Year	Award	Category	Nominated work	Result
2015	41st Seoul Independent Film Festival	Independent Star Award	Steel Flower	Won
2016	11th Max Movie Awards	Rising Star Awards	—N/a	Won
2016	52nd Baeksang Arts Awards	Best New Actress (Film)	Steel Flower	Nominated
2016	3rd Wildflower Film Awards	Best New Actress	Wild Flowers	Nominated
2016	36th Korean Association of Film Critics Awards	Best New Actress	Steel Flower	Won
2017	4th Wildflower Film Awards	Best Actress	Steel Flower	Won

=== Listicles ===
Name of publisher, year listed, name of listicle, and placement
Publisher	Year	Listicle	Placement	Ref.
Korean Film Council	2021	Korean Actors 200 (Note: Introduces 200 actors that best represent the present and future of Korean cinema to the people in the film industry all over the world)	Included	
