= Hansan: Rising Dragon =

2022 South Korean war action film by Kim Han-min

- Theatrical release poster
- Hangul: 한산: 용의 출현
- Hanja: 閑山: 龍의 出現
- RR: Hansan: yongui chulhyeon
- MR: Hansan: yongŭi ch'urhyŏn
- Directed by: Kim Han-min
- Written by: Kim Han-min; Yun Hong-gi
- Produced by: Shin Chang-hwan; Ahn Tae-woon
- Starring: Park Hae-il; Byun Yo-han; Ahn Sung-ki; Son Hyun-joo; Kim Sung-kyu; Kim Sung-kyun; Kim Hyang-gi; Ok Taec-yeon; Gong Myung; Park Ji-hwan; Jo Jae-yoon
- Cinematography: Kim Tae-seong
- Edited by: Lee Gang-hui; An Hyeon-geon
- Music by: Kim Tae-seong
- Production company: Big Stone Pictures
- Distributed by: Lotte Entertainment
- Release date: July 27, 2022
- Running time: 129 minutes
- Country: South Korea
- Languages: Korean; Japanese
- Budget: ₩31.2 billion
- Box office: US$55.7 million

Hansan: Rising Dragon (Korean: 한산: 용의 출현) is a 2022 South Korean historical war action film directed by Kim Han-min. The sequel to 2014's The Admiral: Roaring Currents, the film is the second installment in the Yi Sun-sin trilogy. It stars an ensemble cast led by Park Hae-il as the Korean naval commander Yi Sun-sin. The film depicts the historical Battle of Hansan which took place five years before the Battle of Myeongnyang depicted in The Admiral. It was released on July 27, 2022 in IMAX, 4DX and ScreenX formats.

The film became the second highest-grossing Korean film of 2022 with 7,264,934 admissions and $59,676,622 gross. It is available for streaming on Netflix from December 2, 2022.

== Plot ==
In June 1592, one month after the sea battle at Sacheon, daimyo Wakisaka Yasuharu arrives at the Japanese naval base in Busan to take charge of the fleet and counter the threat posed by Joseon commander Yi Sun-sin. From some terrified survivors of the battle, he learns of a new, fully enclosed Joseon battleship which they have dubbed bokkaisen (after a sea monster from Japanese mythology) and mekurabune ("blind ship"). However, that engagement has revealed some critical flaws in its design, such as the fixed dragon head at its bow being prone to getting stuck after making a ramming attack, and its weaker flank armor. Wakisaka agrees to join forces with the rest of the Japanese navy to ensure a decisive success in their campaign to conquer Joseon and, from there on, Ming China.

At the Left (Note: Literally translated as "left" (좌), as would have been seen from the point of view of the king in the capital region facing south. Thus in context, this would be considered east on a modern map.) Jeolla Navy base at Yeosu, Yi assembles the Joseon admirals for a conference about their upcoming naval operations. Won Gyun, commander of the Western Fleet, argues for a defensive stand rather than a preemptive strike, and after the Japanese sacking of Pyongyang and the king's flight to Uiju becomes public knowledge, other commanders begin to agree with him. After dreaming about his time as a cavalry general against the Jurchen, Yi devises a new strategy which he names "Crane Wing", a crescent-shaped formation designed to trap the enemy from three sides. He also gains the respect of Junsa, a samurai captured at Sacheon after he had wounded Yi with an arquebuse shot. However, after identifying and following one of his agents, a troop of Japanese spies discover Yi's base, free their imprisoned countrymen, damage the turtle ships with fire, and escape with their construction plans. Yi hurries to Suncheon to meet with the vessel's inventor, Na Dae-yong, who is working on an improved version, and declares that he will not use the turtle ships in the next battle, knowing that Wakisaka will discover and exploit their flaws.

After learning of Yi's intended strategy from the construction plans and Junsa's testimony, and upon receiving reinforcements from Katō Yoshiaki (Wakisaka's fiercest rival) and Kuki Yoshitaka with sturdier, armored ships and cannons, Wakisaka decides to go on a two-pronged offensive by land and sea against the Left Jeolla Navy headquarters. Two of Yi's spies, Lim Jun-young and Jeong Bo-reum, are discovered, whereupon Wakisaka expels Kato and Kuki from the alliance and seizes their ships and weapons before setting out to set an ambush for Yi at the strait of Gyeonnaeryang. While Lim escapes on his own, Junsa, who has finally switched his allegiance, helps Jeong convey Wakisaka's plans to Yi. He then tries to alert Jeonju, the fortress covering the land passage to the naval base, but is captured by members of Joseon's Righteous Army. Even though his warning is met with scepticism, Hwang Bak, the militia's commander, decides to secure the pass and invites Junsa to fight by his side.

Upon being informed of Wakisaka's movements, Yi decides to lure him into the open waters at nearby Hansando. When the Joseon fleet arrives at the strait, commanders Eo Yeong-dam and Lee Un-ryong act as bait; when that fails, Yi sets out with the whole fleet, prompting Wakisaka to attack. When Won Gyun's negligence grants the Japanese a breach to charge through, Yi deploys the turtle ships, which he has held in reserve on Na's insistence. After Wakisaka' forces disable them, Yi sends in the improved turtle ship, enabling Eo and Lee to rejoin their lines and complete the Crane Wing. Finally caught in Yi's trap, Wakisaka's fleet is shot to pieces. Wakisaka's last-ditch attempt to ram Yi's flagship is foiled by the new turtle ship, and he is wounded by an arrow from Yi as he abandons the ship. On land, the Righteous Army is reinforced and successfully holds the pass, though Hwang Bak dies in battle.

Following this, Yi continues his campaign for a while and attacks Angolpo and Busan, forcing the Japanese to suspend further naval operations, before retreating back to his base. One year later, Yi erects a new base on Hansan Island, the site of their greatest victory up to that date.

== Cast ==
- Park Hae-il as Yi Sun-sin, a Joseon admiral
- Byun Yo-han as Wakisaka, a Japanese admiral
- Ahn Sung-ki as Eo Yeong-dam, a Joseon naval Commander overseeing the southern waterways
- Son Hyun-joo as Won Gyun, a defense-minded, presumptuous Joseon admiral
- Kim Sung-kyu as Junsa, a Japanese samurai who defects to the Joseon side
- Kim Sung-kyun as Kato, a Japanese general and Wakizaka's military rival
- Kim Hyang-gi as Jeong Bo-reum, a spy who infiltrates the Japanese enemy camp as a courtesan
- Ok Taec-yeon as Lim Jun-young, a scout spying on the enemy's movements
- Gong Myung as Yi Eokgi, a Joseon General and subordinate of Yi Sun-sin
- Park Ji-hwan as Na Dae-yong, the man who designs the turtle ship
- Jo Jae-yoon as Manabe Samanozo, a Japanese general
- Park Hoon as Yi Un-ryong, the governor of Gyeongsang-wo
- Yoon Jin-young as Song Hee-rip, a Joseon General and subordinate of Yi Sun-sin
- Park Jae-min as Watanabe Shichiemon, a Japanese General and subordinate of Wakisaka
- Lee Seo-jun as Sahee, Wakisaka's nephew
- Kim Jae-young as Jung-woon, a brave general next to Admiral Yi Sun-sin.

Hansan Redux

- Moon Sook as Admiral Yi Sun-sin's mother
- Kim Han-min as Kwon Yul

== Production ==
=== Development ===
In 2013, while producing The Admiral: Roaring Currents, Big Stone Pictures revealed their plans to produce two more films related to Yi Sun-sin, titled Emergence of Hansan Dragon and Noryang: Deadly Sea as sequels, depending on the success of The Admiral. Following the box office success of The Admiral which became the most-watched and highest-grossing film of all time in South Korea, production of the sequels was confirmed.

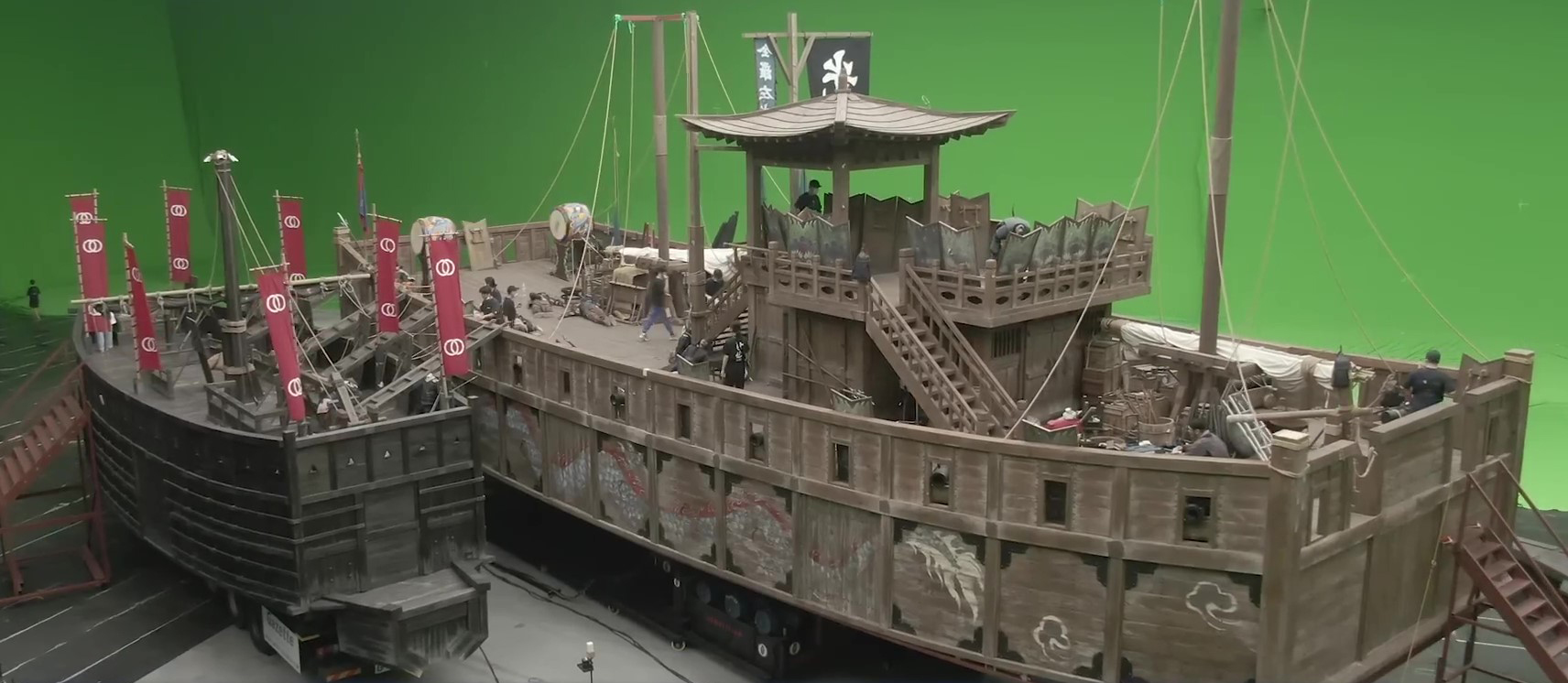
VFX filming set of Hansan: Rising Dragon

=== Filming ===
Principal photography began on May 18, 2020.

The naval battle scenes in the Hansan were shot using visual effects, unlike the previous film The Admiral which was actually filmed in a boat floating on the sea. VFX set for naval battle scenes was built at the Gangneung Speed Skating Stadium used for the 2018 Pyeongchang Winter Olympics. For scenes shot on land, a special set was built in Yeosu, South Jeolla Province.

=== Post-production ===
Post-production took a year. Jeong Chul-min and Jeong Seong-jin served as VFX supervisors.

During the naval battle scene in the latter part of the film, subtitles were added for Korean dialogues because they were not audible due to the sound effects and background music of the battle scenes. This received favorable reactions from the audience and generally positive reviews from the critics.

== Release ==
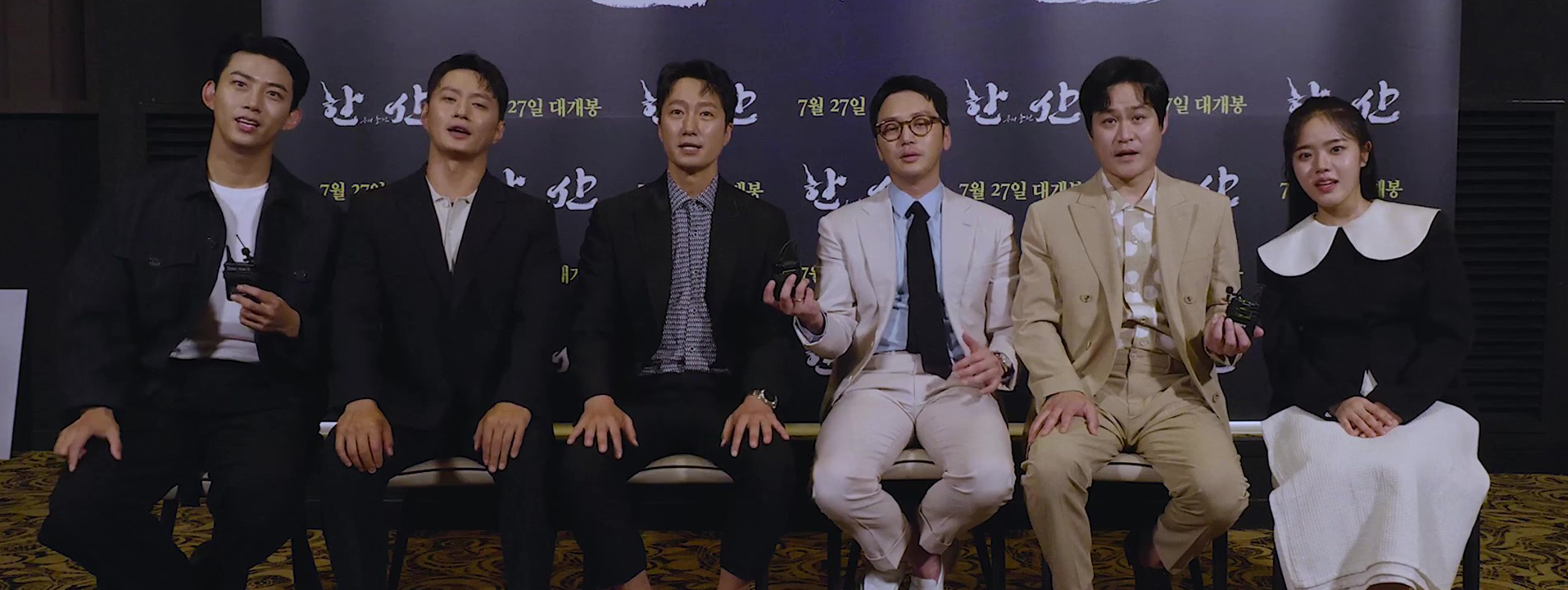
Cast at a press event in July 2022.

It was released on July 27, 2022 in IMAX, 4DX and ScreenX format by Lotte Entertainment. Well Go USA acquired North American rights to distribute the film. The film's rights were also pre-sold to 99 countries including Japan, China, Taiwan, Singapore, Australia, New Zealand, and France. On July 29, it was released on 32 screens in United States.

In July 2022, it was selected as the Centerpiece Presentation film at the 21st New York Asian Film Festival, where it was screened at Lila Acheson Wallace Auditorium, Asia Society on July 28 for its U.S. premiere. It is also invited to the 26th Fantasia International Film Festival and was screened for its North American Premiere on July 27, 2022.

A 150-minute version of the film titled Hansan: Rising Dragon Redux was released theatrically on November 16, 2022. This extended version was screened as the closing film at the 17th London Korean Film Festival on November 17. On December 22, Hansan: Rising Dragon Redux was released on Netflix.

== Reception ==
=== Box office ===
On 25 July 2022, two days before its theatrical release, Hansan: Rising Dragon recorded 147,909 presales, breaking the record for most presale tickets sold in recent history, which was previously held by Oscar-winning film Parasite (2019). The film was released on 2,223 screens on July 27, 2022. The opening recorded 386,000 admissions and topped the South Korean box office. The film surpassed 1 million cumulative admissions in 4 days of release and 2 million admissions in 5 days of release. On 8th day, it became the first Korean film of 2022 after The Roundup to cross 3 million admissions. On 15th day of release, it surpassed 5 million admissions.

As of November 12, 2022, it is the 2nd highest-grossing Korean film of 2022 with gross of US$55.9 million and 7.3 million admissions according to the Korean Film Council.

=== Critical response ===
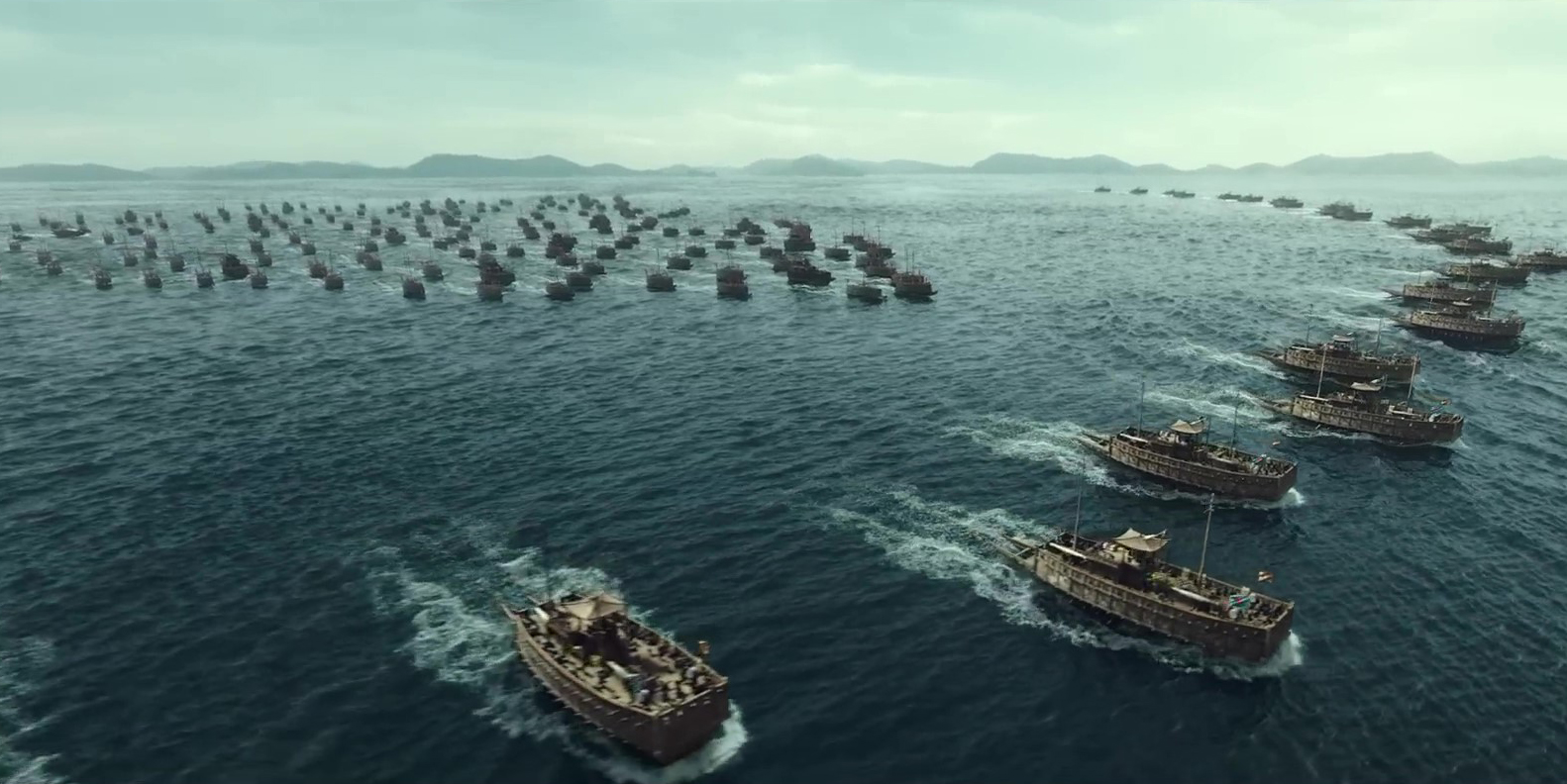
Naval battle (captured from the trailer)

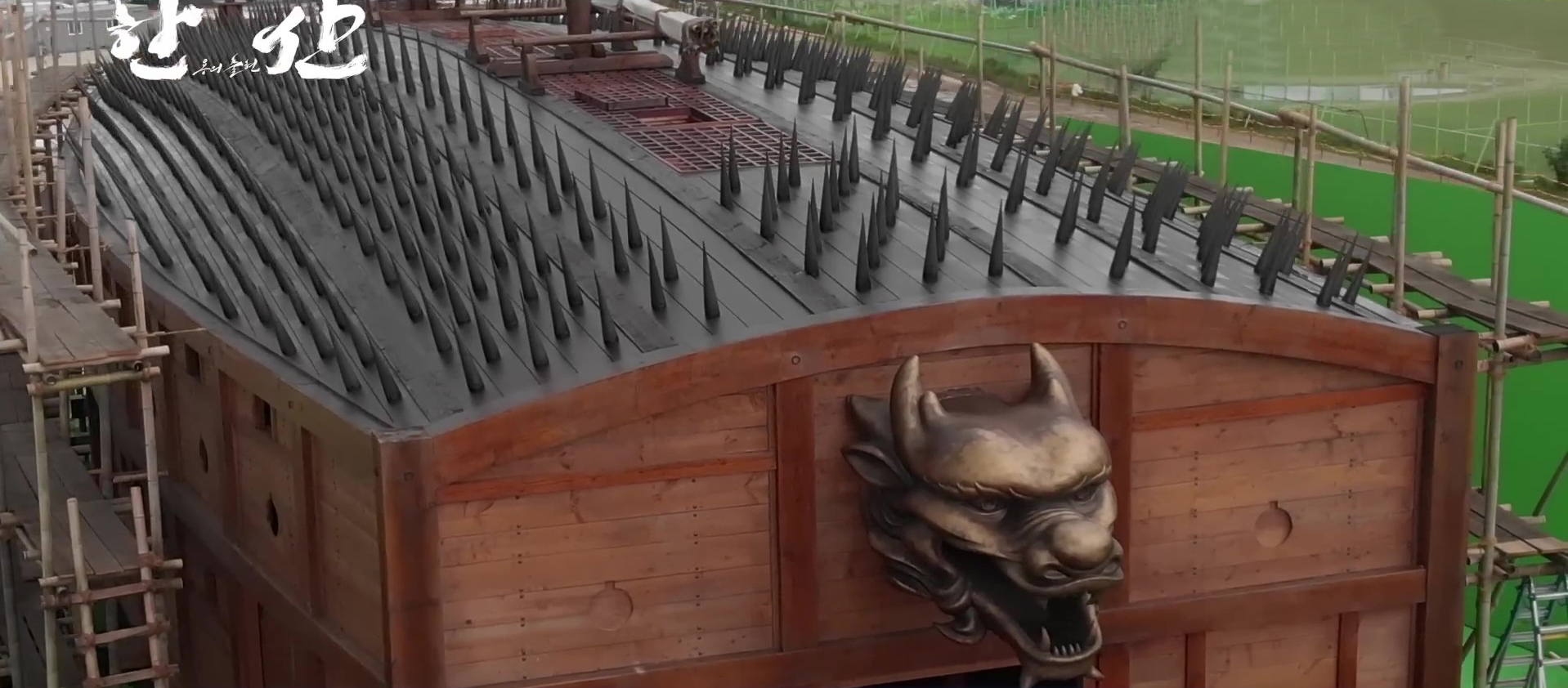
Turtle ship featured in the film (on the filming set)

Writing for Yonhap News Agency, Shim Sun-ah described the film as "a visually spectacular, intriguing prequel of naval epic" with "fast-paced, punchy account of the historical information" and "breathtaking and thrilling scenes." Kim Nara in her review for My Daily appreciated Park Hae-il's portrayal of Yi Sun-sin and cinematic experience of 51-minute naval battle. Choi Tami writing for Maeil Business stated that with clear characters, themes and spectacular naval battle, Hansan has progressed one step compared to The Admiral, and praised the performance of Park Hae-il and other actors. No Cut News' Choi Young-joo called the naval battle "overwhelming not only visually but also aurally" and praised the director for preserving the realism of the war. In her review for Sports Chosun, Jo Ji-young wrote that the recreation of the turtle ship captured the viewers' hearts to the point where the fear the Japanese military experienced after seeing the turtle ship was transmitted to the screen. Jo also praised the direction of Kim Han-min who made up for shortcomings of the previous work (The Admiral), and the performance of Park Hae-il and Byun Yo-han. Song Kyung-won writing for Cine21, appreciated the technical perfection that realistically reproduced the current of the sea satisfactorily and the recreation of turtle ship, adding that the dragon mentioned in the title can be either Yi Sun-sin himself or the turtle ship (Note: On the bow of the turtle ship, a dragon's head is mounted.) which plays an important role in the battle. Concluding, Song described the film as a "gigantic mirror that reflects the history." Kang Nae-ri in her review for YTN, appreciated the Park Hae-il's portrayal of "a leader who struggles day and night to save Joseon" and Byun Yo-han performance which maintained the tension until the end, and stated that the appearance of the turtle ship "brought excitement and exhilaration to the audience". Critics found it interesting that the film is told from the perspective of the Japanese invaders, not letting audience become fully aware of tactics of the Joseon army.

=== Accolades ===
Name of the award ceremony, year presented, category, nominee of the award, and the result of the nomination
Award ceremony	Year	Category	Nominee / Work	Result	Ref.
Asian Journalists Association	2022	AJA Awards	Park Hae-il	Won	
Baeksang Arts Awards	2023	Best Supporting Actor	Byun Yo-han	Won	
Baeksang Arts Awards	2023	Best Film	Hansan: Rising Dragon	Nominated	
Baeksang Arts Awards	2023	Best Director	Kim Han-min	Nominated	
Baeksang Arts Awards	2023	Technical Award	Jeong Seong-jin, Jeong Chul-min (VFX)	Nominated	
Blue Dragon Film Awards	2022	Best Supporting Actor	Byun Yo-han	Won	
Blue Dragon Film Awards	2022	Best Art Direction	Park Gyu-bin	Nominated	
Blue Dragon Film Awards	2022	Best Cinematography and Lighting	Kim Tae-seong, Kim Kyung-seok	Nominated	
Blue Dragon Film Awards	2022	Best Director	Kim Han-min	Nominated	
Blue Dragon Film Awards	2022	Best Editing	Lee Kang-hee, Ahn Hyun-gun	Nominated	
Blue Dragon Film Awards	2022	Best Film	Hansan: Rising Dragon	Nominated	
Blue Dragon Film Awards	2022	Best Music	Kim Tae-seong	Nominated	
Blue Dragon Film Awards	2022	Best New Actor	Lee Seo-jun	Nominated	
Blue Dragon Film Awards	2022	Best Screenplay	Kim Han-min, Yun Hong-gi	Nominated	
Blue Dragon Film Awards	2022	Technical Award	Jeong Seong-jin, Jeong Cheol-min	Nominated	
Buil Film Awards	2022	Best Art Direction (VFX)	Jeong Seong-jin, Jeong Cheol-min	Won	
Buil Film Awards	2022	Best Director	Kim Han-min	Won	
Buil Film Awards	2022	Popular Star Award	Byun Yo-han	Won	
Buil Film Awards	2022	Best Film	Hansan: Rising Dragon	Nominated	
Chunsa Film Art Awards	2022	Best Screenplay	Kim Han-min, Yun Hong-ki, Lee Na-ra	Won	
Chunsa Film Art Awards	2022	Best Director	Kim Han-min	Nominated	
Chunsa Film Art Awards	2022	Best Supporting Actor	Byun Yo-han	Nominated	
Chunsa Film Art Awards	2022	Best Supporting Actress	Kim Hyang-gi	Nominated	
Chunsa Film Art Awards	2022	Technical Award (VFX)	Jeong Seong-jin, Jeong Cheol-min	Nominated	
Director's Cut Awards	2023	Best Director in film	Kim Han-min	Nominated	
Director's Cut Awards	2023	Best Actor in film	Byun Yo-han	Nominated	
Grand Bell Awards	2022	Best Supporting Actor	Byun Yo-han	Won	
Grand Bell Awards	2022	Best Costume Design	Kwon Yoo-jin	Won	
Grand Bell Awards	2022	Best Art Direction	Park Gyu-bin	Nominated	
Grand Bell Awards	2022	Best Cinematography	Kim Tae-seong	Nominated	
Grand Bell Awards	2022	Best Director	Kim Han-min	Nominated	
Grand Bell Awards	2022	Best Film	Hansan: Rising Dragon	Nominated	
Grand Bell Awards	2022	Best Film Editing	Lee Kang-hee, Ahn Hyun-gun	Nominated	
Grand Bell Awards	2022	Best Lighting	Kim Gyeong-seok	Nominated	
Grand Bell Awards	2022	Best Screenplay	Kim Han-min, Yun Hong-gi	Nominated	
Grand Bell Awards	2022	Best Supporting Actress	Kim Hyang-gi	Nominated	
Grand Bell Awards	2022	Best Visual Effects	Jung Seong-jin	Nominated	
Korean Association of Film Critics Awards	2022	Korean Association of Film 10 selections of Kim Hyun-seung	Hansan: Rising Dragon	Won	
Korean Association of Film Critics Awards	2022	Technical Award; Visual Effect	Jung Seong-jin, Jung Cheol-min	Won	
Korean Film Producers Association Award	2022	Sound and Technology Awards	Kim Seok-won, Kim Eun-jeong, Jeong Do-ahn and Lim Jong-hyeok	Won	
