= Deranged (2012 film) =

- Promotional poster for Deranged
- Hangul: 연가시
- RR: Yeongasi
- MR: Yŏn'gasi
- Directed by: Park Jung-woo
- Written by: Park Jung-woo; Jo Dong-in; Kim Kyeong-hoon
- Produced by: Lim Ji-young
- Starring: Kim Myung-min; Kim Dong-wan; Moon Jeong-hee; Lee Hanee
- Cinematography: Gi Se-hun
- Edited by: Park Gok-ji
- Music by: Jo Yeong-wook
- Production company: Oz One Film
- Distributed by: CJ E&M
- Release date: 5 July 2012
- Running time: 109 minutes
- Country: South Korea
- Language: Korean
- Budget: ₩10 billion
- Box office: US$28.4 million

Deranged (Korean: 연가시) is a 2012 South Korean medical disaster thriller film starring Kim Myung-min, Kim Dong-wan, Moon Jeong-hee and Lee Hanee. The film was directed by Park Jung-woo and produced by Lim Ji-young and Oz One Film. Distributed by CJ E&M, the film was released on July 5, 2012, and runs at 109 minutes.

== Plot ==
Jae-hyuk is a former professor with a doctorate in biochemistry who is currently working as a pharmaceutical sales representative after losing his life savings and his job due to a bad investment he made in the stock market on the advice of his younger brother. When a series of dead bodies are found floating in the Han River, the public is shocked to discover that the deaths are related to a fatal outbreak of virus-infected mutant parasitic horsehair worms, called Yeongasi, that can control the human brain. Those infected show symptoms of increased hunger without appropriate weight gain and excessive thirst when the worms are mature and ready to reproduce. Hence, they jump into the river to allow the worms to come out of the body. While the authorities work to find a cure, Jae-hyuk and his brother Jae-pil, a detective who is agonized with guilt for squandering Jae-hyuk's money in the stock market, struggle to save Jae-hyuk's family when they exhibit similar symptoms to the infected.

In Seoul, dead bodies with similar signs of malnutrition are found every morning in rivers all across the country. The police have trouble understanding the cause of the sudden deaths, as all the victims don't show any physical symptoms but look gruesome as soon as they jump into the water. One victim is found dead in his bathtub, but there are also unidentifiable worm-like organisms swimming next to his dead body. Officials at the Ministry of Health find out that these organisms are parasitic horsehair worms that normally use insects as hosts but became mutated into a new form that allows them to infect human bodies as well. The sudden change in appearance that was seen consistently in all victims was caused when the parasites escaped the bodies in the water. As soon as the news gets out and the government makes a public announcement urging people who have been in or near water and show symptoms of hunger and thirst to get checked out, countless people rush to hospitals. Pharmacies are crowded with people desperate to get anthelmintics. Matters become worse when more people jump into rivers overnight and dead bodies float around every morning.

Then it is discovered that using any type of anthelmintic actually causes more excruciating pain and eventual death. Chaos ensues and worsens until one patient claims that he was cured by a specific type of drug called Windazole. The country goes insane in order to get a hold of the drug, but pharmacies run out of supply in less than a day. Government officials contact the pharmaceutical company in charge of making Windazole, ChoA Pharmaceuticals, and demand that they increase supply. However, ever since being acquired by an investment company, the devices involved in creating the drug were poorly managed and the company fails to make a single pill. Public hearings follow as the government requests the company to reveal the drug's composition, but the CEO says that the company's major stockholders refuse to do so, and the government has no legal grounds to force the company to disclose the drug's "recipe" either.

Jae-pil then discovers evidence that this was all planned out by workers at ChoA Pharmaceuticals. He finds someone who used to work at the research team at ChoA and threatens him to tell the truth. The researcher confesses the entire story. A few years back, the researchers at ChoA learned about the parasite Yeongasi and thought that finding out the protein involved in controlling the brain might help with finding a cure to other brain diseases such as Alzheimer's. The team was successful in making a mutant version that used mammals as hosts and seemed to be on the way to success with their research when the company was sold, and the research team was disbanded. Some of the researchers who were angry about the whole incident came together and agreed to take part in a collective stock manipulation scheme in which they bought a bunch of stocks and released the parasite after storing away 100,000 packets of the drug. Consequently, hundreds of thousands of tourists became infected over the summer as they went to rivers for vacation. One of the researchers then acted as if he had been treated by the drug in order to raise stock prices.

Given this information, Jae-pil calls Jae-hyuk, and the two go to the storage the researcher admitted to having kept away the rest of the drugs. When Jae-hyuk finally is about to get a hold of the medicine, someone locks the door to the storage and sets the building on fire. The two survive, but the researcher who had been giving Jae-pil the information is murdered by a mysterious man (who later turns out to be the researcher to claim that Windazole worked), and all of the drugs burn down. Jae-pil then finds out that the murdered researcher had actually been the head of the research team and was a close friend to the CEO. Jae-pil learns that the other researchers had already run away overseas and that the head of the team was just staying behind to see how things panned out. Thus, the entire plan was premeditated and taken out by the CEO and the researchers from the beginning. Meanwhile, the CEO suggests that the government buy the company in its entirety, which would then allow them to find out the drug's composition and make more of it for the rapidly increasing number of patients. The price the CEO offers is completely unreasonable at 5 billion won and most government officials are against the idea, but the Prime Minister says there is no other option and is about to sign the contract. In the nick of time, he is informed of the whole scam and the CEO is arrested. Jae-hyuk is in despair when he suddenly realizes, based on his knowledge of chemistry, that as long as he is able to create a drug with the same active ingredient as Windazole, he should be able to treat his family—he does not necessarily need Windazole itself. Other people join in on the plan and pharmaceutical companies hastily create an effective drug that treats everyone.

The movie ends with Jae-hyuk and his family spending time at an amusement park. Jae-hyuk suggests the family go on vacation overseas all together, preferably to a place with many drugstores. His wife laughs and asks if Jae-hyuk is worried that there might be Yeongasi in other countries as well. Jae-hyuk smiles but suddenly freezes and whips around as the film suddenly transitions to a scene with a dead body floating in New York Harbor.

== Cast ==
- Kim Myung-min - Jae-hyuk
- Moon Jeong-hee - Gyung-seon
- Kim Dong-wan - Jae-pil, a police investigator and younger brother of Jae-hyuk
- Lee Hanee - Yeon-joo, Jae-pil's fiancé
- Eom Ji-seong - Joon-woo
- Yeom Hyun-seo - Ye-ji
- Kang Shin-il - Doctor Hwang
- Jo Deok-hyeon - Tae-won /Yhengmorada
- Jeon Kuk-hwan - Prime Minister
- Choi Jung-woo - Minister of Health and Welfare
- Lee Hyung-chul - James Kim
- Jung In-gi - Sales Office Manager
- Song Young-chang - Doctor Kim
- Choi Il-hwa - South Korean president
- Kim Se-dong - Production Director

== Reception ==
On the first day of its theatrical release, Deranged sold 190,953 tickets, making it number one on the daily box office chart (beating Hollywood film The Amazing Spider-Man which sold 149,170 tickets). The film grossed a total of ₩31,992,014,698 after only five weeks of screening, with 4,515,665 total tickets sold nationwide.

== Awards and nominations ==
Year	Award	Category	Recipient	Result	Ref
2012	49th Grand Bell Awards	Best Supporting Actress	Moon Jeong-hee	Nominated	
2012	33rd Blue Dragon Film Awards	Best Supporting Actress	Moon Jeong-hee	Won	
2012	33rd Blue Dragon Film Awards	Technical Award	Seo Sang-hwa	Nominated	
2013	49th Paeksang Arts Awards	Best Supporting Actress	Moon Jeong-hee	Nominated	
2013	49th Paeksang Arts Awards	Most Popular Actor	Kim Dong-wan	Won	
