= Ash Flower =

- Theatrical release poster
- Hangul: 재꽃
- RR: Jaekkot
- MR: Chaekkot
- Directed by: Park Suk-young
- Written by: Park Suk-young; Ha Sung-tae
- Produced by: Ahn Bo-young
- Starring: Jeong Ha-dam; Jang Hae-gum
- Cinematography: Lee Sung-eun
- Edited by: Cho Hyun-joo
- Music by: Kim Dong-ki
- Release dates: December 1, 2016 (SIFF); July 6, 2017 (South Korea)
- Running time: 125 minutes
- Country: South Korea
- Language: Korean
- Box office: US$26,534

Ash Flower (Korean: 재꽃) is a 2016 South Korean drama film directed by Park Suk-young. It is the third and final film in Park's "Flower Trilogy" with Wild Flowers and Steel Flower. It stars Jeong Ha-dam and Jang Hae-gum.

== Cast ==
- Jeong Ha-dam as Ha-dam
- Jang Hae-gum as Hae-byul
- Jung Eun-kyung as Sam-soon
- Park Myung-hoon as Myong-ho
- Park Hyun-young as Jin-kyung
- Kim Tae-hee as Chul-ki
