= Noryang: Deadly Sea =

2023 South Korean war film

- Theatrical release poster
- Hangul: 노량: 죽음의 바다
- Hanja: 露梁: 죽음의 바다
- Lit.: Noryang: The Sea of Death
- RR: Noryang: jugeumui bada
- MR: Noryang: chugŭmŭi pada
- Directed by: Kim Han-min
- Written by: Kim Han-min; Yun Hong-gi
- Produced by: Kim Joo-kyung; Lee Dae-hee
- Starring: Kim Yoon-seok; Baek Yoon-sik; Jung Jae-young; Huh Joon-ho; Kim Sung-kyu; Lee Kyu-hyung; Lee Moo-saeng; Choi Deok-moon; Ahn Bo-hyun; Park Myung-hoon; Park Hoon; Moon Jeong-hee
- Cinematography: Kim Tae-seong
- Edited by: An Hyeon-geon
- Music by: Kim Tae-seong
- Production company: Big Stone Pictures
- Distributed by: Lotte Entertainment
- Release date: December 20, 2023
- Running time: 153 minutes
- Country: South Korea
- Languages: Korean; Japanese; Mandarin
- Box office: US$34.2 million

Noryang: Deadly Sea (Korean: 노량: 죽음의 바다; lit. 'Noryang: The Sea of Death') is a 2023 South Korean historical war action film directed by Kim Han-min. The sequel to 2022's Hansan: Rising Dragon, the film is the third and final installment in the Yi Sun-sin trilogy. It stars an ensemble cast led by Kim Yoon-seok as the Korean naval commander Yi Sun-sin. The film depicts the historical Battle of Noryang, the last major battle of the Japanese invasions of Korea (1592–1598). It was released theatrically on December 20, 2023.

== Synopsis ==
In the year 1598, the seventh year of the Japanese invasion of Joseon and one year after their final chance of conquest was thwarted by Admiral Yi Sun-sin, Toyotomi Hideyoshi dies after giving the order to withdraw his forces back to the homeland. The Ming Dynasty has also joined the Joseons' efforts to defeat the Japanese conquest army, and Konishi Yukinaga and his forces are besieged by Yi Sun-sin at Suncheon. With Konishi eager to return home, fearing that Toyotomi's rival Tokugawa Ieyasu will be plotting to seize power, he tries to bribe one of the Ming admirals allied with Yi to grant them safe passage. After many failures, Chen Lin shows himself susceptible, and with the additional promise of no harm coming to his men, he agrees to Konishi's request.

Even after his youngest son Myeon is murdered by the Japanese as retaliation for Myeongnyang, Yi is determined to see all the invaders annihilated. When he receives reports of Japanese warships repeatedly entering Chen Lin's camp without a fight, he and Ming vice admiral Deng Zilong, whom he has befriended, confront the admiral and discover evidence of his treasonous collaboration. After threatening to dissolve their alliance if Chen refuses to join him, Yi prepares his forces for an imminent attack. His determination gains him Chen's grudging respect, who then rejoins the combined fleet.

By claiming that Yi would exploit their retreat for an assault on Japan itself, Konishi appeals to fleet commander Shimazu Yoshihiro for assistance to eliminate Yi, which is granted. Knowing that the enemy will move swiftly, Yi decides to intercept Shimazu's approaching fleet at Noryang Strait, sets sail under the cover of night, and leaves his Japanese retainer Junsa behind to deceive Konishi into thinking that Yi's fleet is still maintaining the blockade. He manages to surprise the approaching foe, and his and the Ming fleet enclose Shimazu in a pincer movement, but Shimazu deploys captured Joseon cannons, swiftly evening the odds again.

Meanwhile, at Suncheon, Konishi notices the deception and immediately sets out to aid the relief force. Threatened with getting surrounded, Yi asks Chen and Deng to hold off Shimazu while he engages Konishi. The Ming ships are swiftly surrounded; Deng is killed and Chen on the verge of being overwhelmed when a small force under Junsa's command intervenes, allowing Yi to retreat to Chen, but at the cost of Junsa's life. Shimazu then concentrates his efforts on Yi. While beating his flagship's war drum to rally his allies, Yi is fatally injured by an arquebus shot, but maintains his position until he collapses. On his last order to keep his death secret until after the battle is over, Yi's son Hoe dons his father's armor and takes his place at the drum. Re-encouraged, the allied fleet charges, driving the demoralized Japanese back with crippling losses.

When the truth comes out after the battle is won, the fleet assembles to mourn the fallen admiral, and Yi is given a hero's funeral. His surviving commanders bring the news of his death to Crown Prince Gwang-hae, who honors the inspiration Yi has gifted to all of Joseon.

== Cast ==
- Kim Yoon-seok as Yi Sun-sin
- Baek Yoon-sik as Shimazu Yoshihiro, commander of the Japanese naval force
- Jung Jae-young as Chen Lin, Ming Dynasty navy admiral
- Huh Joon-ho as Deng Zilong, Ming Dynasty vice admiral
- Kim Seong-gyu as Junsa, a Japanese defector who resisted the Japanese invasion
- Lee Kyu-hyung as Arima Harunobu, Konishi Yukinaga's subordinate
- Lee Moo-saeng as Konishi Yukinaga, the leader of the Japanese army who develops a strategy to eliminate Yi Sun-sin
- Choi Deok-moon as Song Hee-rip, a Joseon General and subordinate of Yi Sun-sin
- Ahn Bo-hyun as Yi Hoe, Yi Sun-sin's son
- Park Myung-hoon as Moriatsu, Shimazu's confidant and uncompromising Japanese general
- Park Hoon as Lee Woon-ryong, a military official of Joseon
- Moon Jeong-hee as Lady Bang, Yi Sun-sin's wife
- Ahn Se-ho as General Hyung, a person who commanded the battle on behalf of Yi Sun-sin.
- Yeo Jin-goo as Yi Myeon, Yi Sun-sin's youngest son
- Lee Jae-woo as Japanese army runaway soldier
- Lee Je-hoon as young Gwang-hae, Crown Prince of Joseon

== Production ==
=== Development ===
In 2013, while producing The Admiral: Roaring Currents, Big Stone Pictures revealed their plans to produce two more films related to Yi Sun-sin, titled Appearance of Hansan Dragon and Noryang Sea of Death as sequels, depending on the success of The Admiral. Following the box office success of The Admiral which became the most-watched and highest-grossing film of all time in South Korea, production of the sequels was confirmed.

=== Filming ===
Principal photography began on January 14, 2021, and wrapped on June 15, 2021.

== Release ==
On December 15, 2023, the Chungmugwan Command of the Second Fleet of the South Korean Navy hosted a premiere of the film, which was attended by around 700 spectators, including Navy personnel and family members. The director and some cast members attended: Kim Yoon-seok, Kim Seong-gyu, Lee Moo-saeng, Choi Deok-moon and Park Hoon.

The film was released on December 20, 2023. After filming in 2021, intense post-production work took place, which meant that the release could not take place in 2022. Furthermore, this aligned with the director's desire to release it in winter, the same season in which the battle of Noryang took place.

Outside of South Korea, it premiered in the United States on December 22, 2023, and in Australia and New Zealand on January 4, 2024.

== Reception ==
=== Critical response ===
Kim Jun-mo (Oh My News) begins his film review remembering that Kim Han-min's trilogy is the series that has achieved the most monumental audience results in the South Korean commercial film industry, and in addition to reproducing it on the screen spirit of national hero Yi Sun-sin. He praises the grand scale of the naval battle, "difficult to see even in Hollywood", which achieves the immersion of the spectator in it; and also the technical skill that involves passing on a single basis from the Ming army to Joseon, to the Japanese, and to Admiral Yi. He concludes by highlighting that the action scenes, which made director Kim famous, led him with this last installment of the trilogy at the top of his career.

Son Jeong-bin (Newsis) argues that the film largely depends on the protagonist Kim Yoon-seok. If he follows the style of his predecessors, he surpasses their weak characters with Kim's work: «although the poor script of this work alone could not convince the audience of Yi Sun-sin's feelings, the performance of Kim Yoon-seok goes beyond the script and makes the audience feel the spirit of Yi Sun-sin». The narration of the battle continues to be powerful despite being repeated for the third time, even though it does not present elements of innovation and is resistant to the surroundings of the launch of Hansan, in the summer of 2022. He criticizes the story, «superficial», and instead praises the scene in which Admiral Yi faces his death, it results with «a somewhat common elegance thanks to the directing skills of director Kim Han-min and the acting skills of Kim Yoon-seok».

=== Accolades ===
Name of the award ceremony, year presented, category, nominee of the award, and the result of the nomination
Award	Year	Category	Nominee / Work	Result	Ref.
Baeksang Arts Awards	2024	Best Film	Noryang: Deadly Sea	Nominated	
Baeksang Arts Awards	2024	Best Director	Kim Han-min	Nominated	
Baeksang Arts Awards	2024	Best Actor	Kim Yoon-seok	Nominated	
Buil Film Awards	2024	Best Director	Kim Han-min	Nominated	
Buil Film Awards	2024	Best Art/Technical Award	Jeong Seong-jin	Won	
Buil Film Awards	2024	Best Cinematography	Kim Tae-seong	Nominated	
