= Choi Deok-moon =

South Korean actor

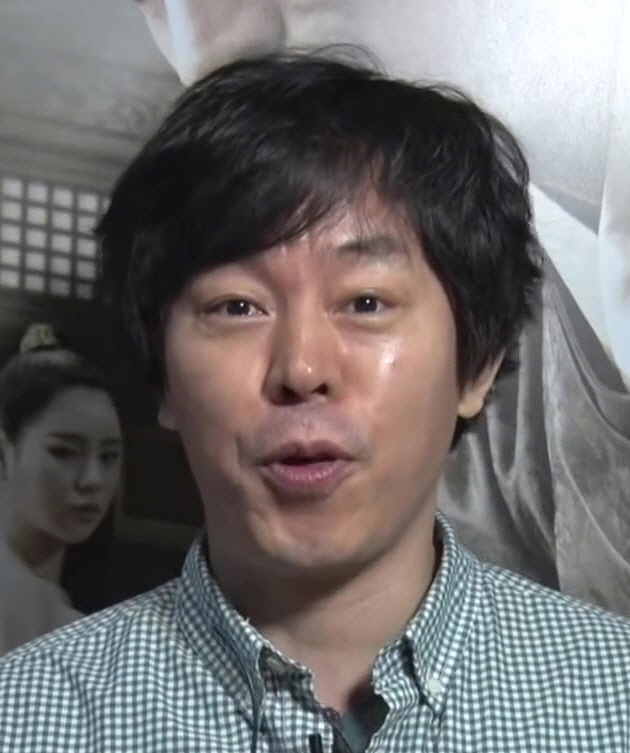
- Choi in 2015
- Born: March 5, 1970 (age 56); Yeongju, Gyeongsangbuk-do, South Korea
- Occupation: Actor
- Years active: 1995–present
- Agent(s): HODU&U Entertainment

Korean name
- Hangul: 최덕문
- RR: Choe Deokmun
- MR: Ch'oe Tŏngmun

Choi Deok-moon (born 1970) is a South Korean actor.

== Filmography ==
=== Film ===
Year	Title	Role	Ref.
1999	Peppermint Candy	Noh Jo-won	
2000	Black Cut	Friend	
2001	Bad Guy	Myung-soo	
2002	YMCA Baseball Team	Lee Eun	
2003	...ing	Gi-soo	
2003	Twenty Questions		
2004	Mokpo the Harbor	Yong-gi	
2004	When I Turned Nine	Park Pal-bong	
2005	Antarctic Journal	Seo Jae-kyung	
2005	Love Talk	Jo Byung-woon	
2006	Silk Shoes	Man-soo	
2006	Running Wild	Inspector Park (cameo)	
2006	Once in a Summer	Seok-young's senior	
2006	Tool	Young man	
2007	Soo	Lee Won-jae	
2007	Rainbow Eyes	Detective Lee	
2008	Bleach	Husband	
2008	Black Heart	Detective 1	
2010	A Good Night Sleep for the Bad	Director Lee	
2010	A Little Pond	Son-in-law Kim, Byung-do	
2010	Haunters	Abby	
2010	Acoustic	Bakery owner (Episode 2 "Bakery Attack")	
2011	Officer of the Year	Balbari	
2011	Hindsight	Haeundae gang boss	
2012	Hoya (Eighteen, Nineteen)	Moderator (cameo)	
2012	Helpless	Ha Sung-sik	
2012	Doomsday Book	Cook	
2012	The Thieves	Casino manager	
2013	Mai Ratima	Karaoke owner	
2013	The Terror Live	secretary Kim Sang-mo	
2013	Shorts Meet Shorts	Film director	
2014	The Admiral: Roaring Currents	Captain Song Yeo-jong	
2014	Manhole	Kim Jong-ho	
2014	Tuning Fork	Director of Obstetrics and Gynecology	
2015	Assassination	Hwang Deok-sam	
2015	The Throne	Hong In-han	
2017	Another Way	Officer (cameo)	
2017	Yongsoon	Father	
2017	The Swindlers	Lee Kang-seok	
2018	Microhabitat	Kim Rok-yi	
2018	The Accidental Detective 2: In Action	Kim Jung-hwan	
2018	The Drug King	Director Goo	
2019	Black Money	Seo Kwon-young	
2020	More Than Family	Tae Hyo	
2022	Special Delivery	Im Ki-bang (special appearance)	
2022	Limit		
2023	Noryang: Deadly Sea	Song Hee-rip	
TBA	Canvas of Blood		

=== Television series ===
Year	Title	Role	Ref.
2003	Good Person		
2004	Sunlight Pours Down		
2006	Drama City – My Beautiful Friend	Chan-sik	
2006	Drama City – While the Memory Is Asleep	Engineer	
2006–2007	The Snow Queen	Section chief Oh	
2007	Drama City – In the Flower Garden	Min-joon	
2007	Lucifer	Kang Hee-soo	
2008–2009	Big Sister	Deok-gi	
2009–2010	Can't Stop Now	Goo Jin-woo	
2010	The Slave Hunters	Seonbi Jo	
2010	KBS Drama Special – An Awful Lot of Coincidences	Kyung-soo	
2011	KBS Drama Special – That Man Is There	Jae-hoon	
2011	Kimchi Family	Jo Dae-shik	
2011	KBS Drama Special – Guardian Angel Kim Young-goo	Kang-bae	
2012	I Love Lee Taly	Tae-ri's uncle	
2012–2013	The King's Doctor	King Hyojong	
2013	Don't Look Back: The Legend of Orpheus	Kang Hee-soo	
2013	Reply 1994	Kim Yoon-shik	
2013–2014	Prime Minister & I	Go Dal-pyo	
2014	KBS Drama Special – I'm Dying Soon	Doctor	
2014	Triangle	Jang Jeong-gook	
2014–2015	Schoolgirl Detectives	Ahn Hong-min	
2014–2015	Cheo Yong	Yang Soo-hyuk	
2015	Hogu's Love	So Shi-min	
2015	Hello Monster	Na Bong-sung	
2015	Cheer Up!	Kim Byung-jae	
2016	One More Happy Ending	Team leader	
2016	Local Hero	Director Min	
2016	Memory	Joo Jae-min	
2016	Hello, My Twenties!	Oh Jong-gyu	
2016	Gogh, The Starry Night	Choi Chang-seop	-
2016–2017	Solomon's Perjury	Kim Sang-deok (cameo)	
2017	Chicago Typewriter	Jeon Seol's father (cameo, episodes 3 & 16)	
2018	Are You Human?	David	
2018	The Time	Nam Dae-cheol	
2018	Drama Stage – Goodbye My Life	Kim	
2019	He Is Psychometric	Kim Gap-yong	
2019	Doctor Prisoner	Jang Min-seok	
2020	Money Game	Gook Kyeong-min	
2020	Search	Han Dae-sik	
2021	Vincenzo	Tak Hong-shik	
2021	Hospital Playlist 2	Chu Cheol-woo (Cameo, Episode 10)	
2022	Green Mothers' Club	Joo-seok	
2022	Doctor Lawyer	Lee Do-hyeong	
2022–2023	The Forbidden Marriage	Gwaeng-i	
2023	Payback: Money and Power	Nam Sang-il	
2023	Miraculous Brothers	Team Leader Oh	
2023	Moving	Jeon Yeong-seok	
2024	Chief Detective 1958	Yu Dae-cheon	
2026	Teach You a Lesson	Cheon Sang-yeol	
2026	Doctor X: Mafia in White	Yang Eung-gu	

== Theater ==
Year	English title	Korean title	Ref.
2005	Dry and Wear Out	마르고 닳도록	
2005	Stones in his Pockets	주머니 속의 돌	
2006	There	거기	
2007	Speak During the Last 20 Minutes	마지막 20분 동안 말하다	
2007	High Life	하이라이프	
2007	Mask	가면	
2008	Thermal Mom	엄마열전	
2008	Thumb Girls	썸걸즈	
2009	Neul-geun Thief Story	늘근도둑 이야기	
2010	Yang Deok-won's story	양덕원이야기	
2010	| B언소		
2016		흑흑흑 희희희	
