= Park Suk-young =

South Korean filmmaker (born 1973)

- Born: 1973 (age 52–53); Seoul, South Korea
- Occupations: Film director, screenwriter

Korean name
- Hangul: 박석영
- RR: Bak Seokyeong
- MR: Pak Sŏgyŏng

Park Suk-young (Korean: 박석영; born 1973) is a South Korean film director and screenwriter.

== Personal life ==
Born in 1973, Park studied Korean Literature at Sogang University and Cinema at the Columbia University in New York. He worked as an actor and assistant director in director Jeon Kye-soo's 2010 film Lost & Found before directing his first feature Wild Flowers in 2015. He followed with Steel Flower in 2015 and made his third film Ash Flower in 2016, thus completing his "Flower Trilogy" which deals with the theme of "teenagers in crisis".

== Filmography ==
- Wild Flowers (2015)
- Steel Flower (2015)
- Ash Flower (2016)
