= A Piece of Your Mind =

2020 South Korean television series

- Promotional poster
- Hangul: 반의 반
- Lit.: Half of a Half
- RR: Banui ban
- MR: Panŭi pan
- Genre: Melodrama
- Created by: Studio Dragon
- Written by: Lee Sook-yeon
- Directed by: Lee Sang-yeob
- Starring: Jung Hae-in; Chae Soo-bin; Lee Ha-na; Kim Sung-kyu
- Country of origin: South Korea
- Original language: Korean
- No. of episodes: 12 (Note: Originally scheduled to air for 16 episodes, the series was shortened by 4 episodes due to the decreasing ratings.)

Production
- Running time: 70 minutes
- Production companies: The Unicorn; Movie Rock

Original release
- Network: tvN
- Release: March 23 – April 28, 2020

A Piece of Your Mind (Korean: 반의 반; RR: Banui ban) is a 2020 South Korean television series starring Jung Hae-in, Chae Soo-bin, Lee Ha-na, and Kim Sung-kyu. It aired on tvN from March 23 to April 28, 2020.

== Synopsis ==
A drama-romance between Moon Ha-won (Jung Hae-In) and Han Seo-woo (Chae Soo-Bin). Moon Ha-won is an AI programmer and he is the founder of AH Company. He is a consistent person with a good heart. Meanwhile, Han Seo-woo works as a classical music recording engineer. Her life is unstable without a family or house, but she is a positive person.

== Cast ==
=== Main ===
- Jung Hae-in as Moon Ha-won
  - Nam Da-reum as young Moon Ha-won

An artificial intelligence programmer who founded the company AH. He is very serious about his work though he seldom gets angry and is known as being a kind person. His unrequited love is Kim Ji-soo, who is also his childhood friend. He later falls for Han Seo-woo.

- Chae Soo-bin as Han Seo-woo

A 29 years old classical recording engineer who has a positive and bright personality despite her family and social issues. She gets along with Kim Ji-soo very well. Later, she falls for Ha-won.

- Lee Ha-na as Moon Soon-ho

A gardener and granddaughter of Moon Jung-nam, the diplomat who sponsored Ha-won. She manages her grandmother's garden and flower garden. She calls Ha-won her uncle, though they are almost of the same age.

- Kim Sung-kyu as Kang In-wook
  - Lee Se-jin as young Kang In-wook

A pianist who's acclaimed in musical circles for his artistry and skill, but is not widely recognized by the public. He is Ji-soo's husband.

=== Supporting ===
- Kim Jeong-woo as Kim Hoon
- Woo Ji-hyun as Bae Jin-hwan
- Lee Sang-hee as Jeon Eun-joo
- Kang Bong-sung as Kim Chang-seop
- Kim Nu-ri as Choi Soo-ji
- Ye Soo-jung as Eun Soo-jung
- Kim Bo-yeon as Moon Jeong-nam
- Lee Seung-joon as Choi Jin-moo
- Park Ju-hyun as Kim Ji-soo
- Lee Jung-eun as Kim Min-jung

=== Special appearances ===
- Jang Hye-jin as Han Seo-woo's mother

== Production ==
Due to the decreasing ratings, and because tvN recorded its lowest ratings in two years during its Monday–Tuesday time slot, it was announced on April 8, 2020 that the series would be shortened by 4 episodes, bringing the total number of episodes to 12.

== Original soundtrack ==
A Piece of Your Mind OST

Soundtrack album by Various Artists
- Released: 2020
- Genre: Soundtrack
- Languages: Korean; English
- Label: Genie Music

=== Part 1 ===
Released on March 31, 2020
| No. | Title | Lyrics | Music | Artist | Length |
|---|---|---|---|---|---|
| 1. | "Slowly Fall" | Nam Hye-seung; Jello Ann | Nam Hye-seung; B.a.B | Ha Hyun-sang | 4:01 |
| 2. | "Slowly Fall" (Inst.) | | Nam Hye-seung; B.a.B | | 4:01 |
| Total length: | | | | | 8:02 |

=== Part 2 ===
Released on April 6, 2020
| No. | Title | Lyrics | Music | Artist | Length |
|---|---|---|---|---|---|
| 1. | "Rain or Shine" | Nam Hye-seung; Jello Ann | Nam Hye-seung; B.a.B | Elaine | 4:22 |
| 2. | "Rain or Shine" (Inst.) | | Nam Hye-seung; B.a.B | | 4:22 |
| Total length: | | | | | 8:44 |

=== Part 3 ===
Released on April 14, 2020
| No. | Title | Lyrics | Music | Artist | Length |
|---|---|---|---|---|---|
| 1. | "Think It's You" (너라고 생각해) | Jung Joon-il; Nam Hye-seung; Park Jin-ho | Nam Hye-seung; Park Jin-ho | Jung Joon-il | 4:20 |
| 2. | "Think It's You" (Inst.) | | Nam Hye-seung; Park Jin-ho | | 4:20 |
| Total length: | | | | | 8:40 |

=== Part 4 ===
Released on April 21, 2020
| No. | Title | Lyrics | Music | Artist | Length |
|---|---|---|---|---|---|
| 1. | "Who I Strolled With" (함께 발을 맞춰 거닐던) | DOKO; Son Jae-min | DOKO; Son Jae-min | Poetic Narrator | 3:10 |
| 2. | "Who I Strolled With" (Inst.) | | DOKO; Son Jae-min | | 3:10 |
| Total length: | | | | | 6:20 |

== Viewership ==
A Piece of Your Mind : South Korea viewers per episode (thousands)

| Season | Episode number | | | | | | | | | | | | Average |
| Season | 1 | 2 | 3 | 4 | 5 | 6 | 7 | 8 | 9 | 10 | 11 | 12 | Average |
|---|---|---|---|---|---|---|---|---|---|---|---|---|---|
| 1 | 553 | 448 | N/A | N/A | N/A | N/A | N/A | N/A | N/A | N/A | N/A | N/A | N/A |

Source: Audience measurement performed nationwide by Nielsen Korea.

Average TV viewership ratings
| Ep. | Original broadcast date | Average audience share (Nielsen Korea) |
|---|---|---|
| 1 | March 23, 2020 | 2.449% |
| 2 | March 24, 2020 | 2.122% |
| 3 | March 30, 2020 | 1.539% |
| 4 | March 31, 2020 | 1.272% |
| 5 | April 6, 2020 | 1.451% |
| 6 | April 7, 2020 | 1.178% |
| 7 | April 13, 2020 | 1.197% |
| 8 | April 14, 2020 | 1.122% |
| 9 | April 20, 2020 | 1.150% |
| 10 | April 21, 2020 | 1.114% |
| 11 | April 27, 2020 | 1.050% |
| 12 | April 28, 2020 | 1.214% |
| Average | | 1.405% |
In the table above, the blue numbers represent the lowest ratings and the red numbers represent the highest ratings.; This drama airs on a cable channel/pay TV which normally has a relatively smaller audience compared to free-to-air TV/public broadcasters (KBS, SBS, MBC and EBS).

== International Broadcast ==
- In India this series aired on MX Player from 21 November 2023 (every Friday new episode).
