= Limit (film) =

2022 South Korean crime thriller film

- Official release poster
- Hangul: 리미트
- RR: Rimiteu
- MR: Rimit'ŭ
- Directed by: Lee Seung-Jun
- Screenplay by: Lee Seung-Jun; Jai Ho-shin
- Produced by: Oh Pil-jin; Chae Gil-byeong; Jai Ho-shin; Choe Gwang-rae
- Starring: Lee Jung-hyun; Moon Jeong-hee; Choi Deok-moon; Park Myung-hoon
- Cinematography: Kim Seong-hwan
- Production companies: Better Tomorrow; Naro Pictures; Joy & Cinema; JNC Media Group
- Distributed by: TCO The Contents On; JNC Media Group
- Release date: August 31, 2022
- Running time: 87 minutes
- Country: South Korea
- Language: Korean
- Box office: est. US$$489,554

Limit (Korean: 리미트) is a 2022 South Korean crime thriller film directed by Lee Seung-Jun, starring Lee Jung-hyun, Moon Jeong-hee, Choi Deok-moon and Park Myung-hoon. The film revolves around life safety policewoman So-eun, who as an undercover officer plays the mother of a serial kidnapping victim, faces the extreme crisis while solving the worst kidnapping case ever. It was released on August 31, 2022.

== Cast ==
- Lee Jung-hyun as So-eun, a police officer from the Life Safety Department, playing role of a mother of serial kidnapping victim
- Moon Jeong-hee as Hye-jin, a friendly elementary school health teacher during the day, but a vicious villain
- Jin Seo-yeon as Yeon-joo, a strong mother, who is the starting point of a child serial kidnapping case
- Choi Deok-moon as Seong-chan, a detective in the homicide squad
- Park Myung-hoon as Joon-yong, a maniac with a ruthless personality and a member of a criminal group
- Park Kyung-hye as Myeong-seon, vicious villain duo with Joon-yong
- Oh Min-suk as Lee Cheol-woo, a diplomat and husband of Yeon-joo
- Cha Hee as Seon-mi
- Kim Ha-eon as Won-ho
- Lee Ji-hyun as Hyo-eun
- Jeon Guk-hyang as mother of So-eun
- Lim Cheol-hyung as Park Hyuk-jun, University Hospital Specialist

== Production ==
Lee Jung-hyun, Moon Jeong-hee and Jin Seo-yeon were cast in main leads of the film. Oh Min-seok joined the cast in August 2020. In July 2020, Park Myung-hoon confirmed to appear in the film.

Principal photography began on July 10, 2020, and the filming was wrapped up on September 27, 2020.

Production presentation was given on July 14, 2022 at Lotte Cinema Konkuk University in Gwangjin District, Seoul.

== Release ==
The film was scheduled to be released on August 17, but on August 3, the date was advanced to August 31, 2022. It has runtime of 87 minutes.

== Reception ==
=== Box office ===
The film was released on August 31 on 684 screens.

As of December 4, 2022, it is at the 28th place among Korean film released in 2022 with gross of US$489,554 and 68,097 admissions.

=== Critical response ===
Kim Na-yeon writing in Star News wrote, "Limit is a film for maternal love by and for maternal love." Appreciating performances of the cast Kim wrote, "performances of the actors are flawless." Concluding she stated, "In particular, Limit is a worthwhile movie in that it tried an action thriller with three female actors as the main characters." Ko Jae-wan of Sports Chosun also praised the performances of female cast but criticised the story writing, "the biggest weakness of Limit seems to be the story line." Concluding Ko opined, "Limit is a meaningful work just because it is a female action thriller movie that has been out for a long time after breaking through the corona era." Lee Yoo-chae of Cine21 wrote, "Limit, has clear goal as it concentrates only on the process of mother rescuing her child." Lee opined that in the film villain character was not fully expressed, which reduced "the completeness of the film". Concluding, Lee stated, "The flow is often interrupted by presenting only the situation without considering the context before and after."
