= Moon Jeong-hee =

South Korean actress (born 1976)

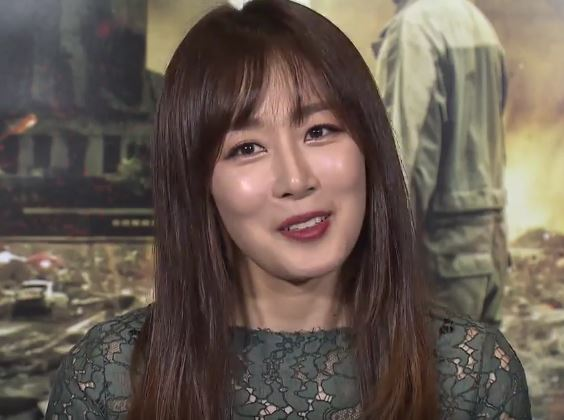
- Moon in 2016
- Born: January 12, 1976 (age 50); South Korea
- Other name: Moon Jung-hee
- Education: Korea National University of Arts (Theatre Studies)
- Occupation: Actress
- Years active: 1998–present
- Agent: Ace Factory

Korean name
- Hangul: 문정희
- Hanja: 文晶熙
- RR: Mun Jeonghui
- MR: Mun Chŏnghŭi

Moon Jeong-hee (born January 12, 1976) is a South Korean actress. She has won Blue Dragon Film Award for Best Supporting Actress for her performance in Deranged (2012) and Best Supporting Actress award in Buil Film Awards for her performance in Cart (2014).

== Early life and education ==
Moon Jeong-hee graduated from the Korea National University of Arts with a degree in Theatre Studies. She made her theater debut in a 1998 staging of Blood Brothers.

== Career ==
Though she hasn't found full-fledged stardom, the actress has built a solid body of work alternating leading and supporting roles. 2012 hit Deranged was her first starring role in a commercial film, for which she won Best Supporting Actress at the 33rd Blue Dragon Film Awards.

Moon has also drawn positive reviews for her performances in Hide and Seek (2013), Cart (2014), and Mama (2014).

== Other activities ==
Having learned salsa in middle school, Moon became an accomplished salsa dancer. She has worked as a salsa dancing teacher in between projects, and can also do jazz dancing and the pansori.

Moon is fluent in three languages - Korean, English and French. She was named the goodwill ambassador of international children's rights group Safe Kids Korea in 2010.

In 2012 she hosted the closing ceremony of the Jeonju International Film Festival.

In 2021, she was selected as jury member for Bucheon Choice Features section of 25th Bucheon International Fantastic Film Festival held in July.

== Filmography ==
=== Film ===
Year	Title	Role	Notes/Ref.
2001	I Wish I Had a Wife		
2001	Take Care of My Cat	Team leader	
2001	Falling Season		short film
2002	Three	Hyun-joo	segment: "Memories"
2003	Wishing Stairs	Dance teacher	
2004	Dance with the Wind	Ji-yeon	
2004	Low Life	Hong Su-bi	
2005	My Girl and I	Soon-im / Soon-im's daughter	
2006	Running Wild	Yoon Jung-min	
2006	Les Formidables	Female singer	
2007	Big Bang	Han Kyung-soon	
2009	Why Did You Come to My House?		
2010	Troubleshooter	Oh Kyung-shin	
2010	Cafe Noir	Mi-yeon 1	
2011	Sorry, Thanks	adult Bo-eun (cameo)	segment: "My Younger Brother"
2012	Deranged	Kyung-soon	
2013	Hide and Seek	Joo-hee	
2014	Cart	Hye-mi	
2014	Dad for Rent	Ji-soo	
2016	Pandora	Jung-hye	
2018	Seven Years of Night	Hyun-soo's wife	
2018	Dark Figure of Crime	Kim Soo-min	Special appearance
2020	The Day I Died: Unclosed Case	Jeong-mi	
2022	Limit	Hyejin	
2023	Noryang: Deadly Sea	Lady Bang	
2025	The Match	Jung Mi-hwa	

=== Television drama ===
Year	Title	Role
2003	Nursery Story	
2005	Shin Don	Hye-bi
2006	Alone in Love	Jung Yoo-kyung
2006	Singles Game	Seo Hye-jin
2006	Lovers	Sang-taek's wife
2007	A Happy Woman	Lee Ji-sook
2007	Air City	Seo Myung-woo
2008	My Sweet Seoul	Nam Yoo-hee
2008	Daughter-in-Law	Lee Soon-jung
2009	Empress Cheonchu	Empress Munhwa
2009	Father's House	Lee Hyun-jae
2010	Oh! My Lady	Han Jung-ah
2010	KBS Drama Special: "Cutting Off the Heart"	Yoon Sun-young
2011	I Believe in Love	Kim Young-hee
2011	A Thousand Days' Promise	Jang Myung-hee
2011	My One And Only	Cha Do-young
2012	KBS Drama Special: "Still Picture"	Seo Eun-soo
2013	The Firstborn	Park Jung-shim (cameo)
2014	Mama	Seo Ji-eun
2015	Sweet, Savage Family	Kim Eun-ok
2019	Vagabond	Jessica
2020	When the Weather Is Fine	Shim Myeong-yeo
2020	Mystic Pop-up Bar	Hyun-ok (Cameo, Ep. 9)
2020	Search	Kim Da-jung
2021	Times	Kim Young-joo

=== Web series ===
Year	Title	Role	Ref.
2024	The 8 Show	5th Floor	

=== Variety show ===
Year	Title	Network	Notes
2009	A Night of Cultural Walks	KBS2	
2011	Brunch	tvN	MC

== Theater ==
Year	Title	Role
1998	Blood Brothers	
2001	The Rocky Horror Show	
2003	Grease	Sandy
2009	New Kang Full's Soonjung Manhwa	

== Awards and nominations ==
Year	Award	Category	Nominated work	Result
2008	SBS Drama Awards	Producer's Award	My Sweet Seoul, Daughter-in-Law	Won
2009	Asia Latin Culture Festival	Lifetime Achievement Award	—N/a	Won
2009	KBS Drama Awards	Best Supporting Actress	Empress Cheonchu	Won
2011	KBS Drama Awards	Best Supporting Actress	I Believe in Love, My One and Only	Nominated
2012	1st K-Drama Star Awards	Excellence Award, Actress	My One And Only	Nominated
2012	KBS Drama Awards	Best Actress in a One-Act/Special Drama	Still Picture	Nominated
2012	49th Grand Bell Awards	Best Supporting Actress	Deranged	Nominated
2012	33rd Blue Dragon Film Awards	Best Supporting Actress	Deranged	Won
2013	49th Baeksang Arts Awards	Best Supporting Actress	Deranged	Nominated
2013	50th Grand Bell Awards	Best Actress	Hide and Seek	Nominated
2013	34th Blue Dragon Film Awards	Best Leading Actress	Hide and Seek	Nominated
2014	50th Baeksang Arts Awards	Best Actress (Film)	Hide and Seek	Nominated
2014	34th Golden Cinema Festival	Special Jury Prize	Hide and Seek	Won
2014	22nd Korea Culture and Entertainment Awards	Best Actress	Dad for Rent	Won
2014	3rd APAN Star Awards	Excellence Award, Actress in a Miniseries	Mama	Nominated
2014	MBC Drama Awards	Top Excellence Award, Actress in a Special Project Drama	Mama	Nominated
2015	51st Baeksang Arts Awards	Best Actress (TV)	Mama	Nominated
2015	51st Baeksang Arts Awards	Best Supporting Actress (Film)	Cart	Nominated
2015	24th Buil Film Awards	Best Supporting Actress	Cart	Won
2015	36th Blue Dragon Film Awards	Best Supporting Actress	Cart	Nominated
2015	MBC Drama Awards	Top Excellence Award, Actress in a Miniseries	Sweet, Savage Family	Nominated
2019	SBS Drama Awards	Best Supporting Actress	Vagabond	Won
