= Kim Han-min =

South Korean film director and screenwriter

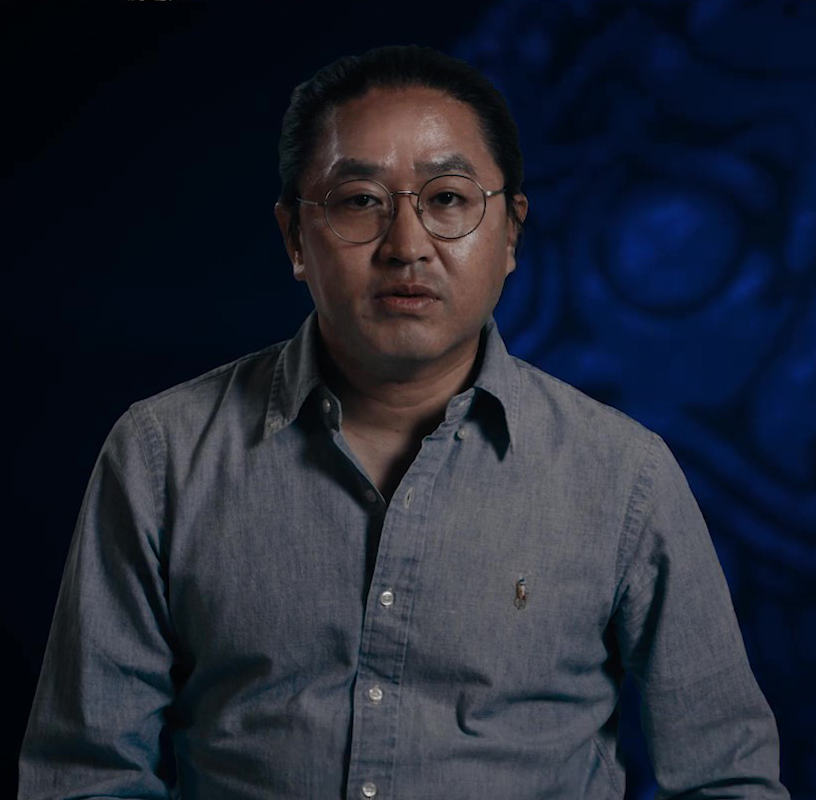
- Kim in 2022
- Born: November 5, 1969 (age 56); Suncheon, South Korea
- Education: Dongguk University Graduate School of Film Arts
- Occupations: Film director; screenwriter
- Years active: 1995–present

Korean name
- Hangul: 김한민
- Hanja: 金漢珉
- RR: Gim Hanmin
- MR: Kim Hanmin

Kim Han-min (born November 5, 1969) is a South Korean film director and screenwriter. He directed the feature films Paradise Murdered (2007), Handphone (2009), War of the Arrows (2011), and The Admiral: Roaring Currents (2014).

== Career ==
After graduating from Dongguk University's Graduate School of Film Arts, Kim Han-min gained accolades for two of his short films - Sunflower Blues which screened at the Puchon International Fantastic Film Festival as well as the New York Independent Film Festival; and Three Hungry Brothers which received awards at the Mise-en-scene Genre Film Festival, the Asiana International Short Film Festival, and the Seoul Digital Film Festival.

In 2007 he made his feature directorial debut with the mystery-thriller Paradise Murdered starring Park Hae-il, Park Sol-mi and Sung Ji-ru. A fictionalized account of a murder that took place on a secluded island in the 1980s involving rational and irrational horrors, the film sold over 2 million tickets nationwide. In his second feature, Kim shifted his setting to the big city, with blackmail thriller Handphone (2009) revolving around every urbanite's essential hardware, the cell phone. Starring Uhm Tae-woong and Park Yong-woo, it fell short of both the commercial and critical successes of his first film.

Set during the second Manchu invasion of 1636, Kim's third film War of the Arrows (2011) combined well-choreographed combat sequences and special effects, fast pacing, a tense plot and the thrill of the chase to tell the story of a master archer and his quest to rescue his sister from Qing Dynasty soldiers. The period action film unexpectedly drew an audience of 7.46 million, making it the highest grossing Korean film of 2011. It also won recognition at the Grand Bell Awards and the Blue Dragon Film Awards, notably for its lead actors Park Hae-il, Ryu Seung-ryong and Moon Chae-won.

Kim's follow-up in 2014 was another period epic, Battle of Myeongryang, Whirlwind Sea (released internationally as The Admiral: Roaring Currents), which depicted the legendary sea battle between 12 vessels of the Korean navy led by the most admired military figure in Korea, General Yi Sun-sin (played by Choi Min-sik), and 330 invading Japanese ships, which are eventually defeated. Given the disparity in numbers, the battle is regarded as one of Yi's most remarkable victories. It became the all-time most successful film in South Korean box office history, the first ever to reach 15 million admissions and the first local film to gross more than US$100 million.

To commemorate Yi's 407th birth anniversary in 2015, Kim and Jung Se-kyu co-directed Roaring Currents: The Road of the Admiral, a documentary prequel to The Admiral: Roaring Currents in which cast members of the 2014 film retraced the 450-kilometer path that the admiral walked in preparation for the Battle of Myeongnyang, based on the war diary that Yi wrote.

Beginning with 2014 film, The Admiral: Roaring Currents, Kim created Yi Sun-sin trilogy, based on three major naval battles led by Admiral Yi Sun-sin. The second film Hansan: Rising Dragon, based on Battle of Hansan Island which took place 5 years before Battle of Myeongnyang depicted in The Admiral, was released in 2022. Park Hae-il portrayed Admiral Yi in the film.

Kim's follow-up to Noryang: Deadly Sea (2023) was first announced in October 2024 during the "Plus M X SLL Night" event held at the 29th Busan International Film Festival. Park Bo-gum who had a role in Kim's The Admiral: Roaring Currents (2014), is set to lead the film titled The Sword: Rebirth of the Red Wolf which is set in Goguryeo. Filming began in January 2026 with a planned 2027 release.

== Filmography ==
Key
†	Denotes films that have not yet been released

=== Feature films ===
Year	Film	Credited as			Notes	Ref.
Year	Film	Director	Writer	Producer	Notes	Ref.
2007	Paradise Murdered	Yes	Yes	No		
2009	Handphone	Yes	Yes	No	Also script editor, actor	
2011	War of the Arrows	Yes	Yes	No		
2014	The Admiral: Roaring Currents	Yes	Yes	Yes		
2015	The Hunt	No	Adaptation	Yes		
2015	Roaring Currents: The Road of the Admiral	Yes	No	Yes	Documentary	
2019	The Battle: Roar to Victory	No	Adaptation	Yes		
2020	Oh! My Gran	No	Adaptation	Yes		
2022	Hansan: Rising Dragon	Yes	Yes	No	Also actor	
2023	Noryang: Deadly Sea	Yes	Yes	No		
2027	The Sword: Rebirth of the Red Wolf †	Yes	TBA	TBA		

=== Short films ===
Year	Film	Credited as			Notes
Year	Film	Director	Writer	Producer	Notes
1995	A Painter Story	Yes	No	No	
1995	Beyond...	Yes	No	No	
1997	Sympathy	Yes	No	No	
1998	Rush	Yes	No	No	
1999	Sunflower Blues	Yes	Yes	No	editor
2003	Three Hungry Brothers	Yes	Yes	No	editor
2007	A Wintering	No	No	No	Actor

=== Television series ===
- Seven Years' War (TBA) – director

== Accolades ==
Awards and nominations
Year	Award ceremony	Category	Nominee / Work	Result	Ref.
2007	28th Blue Dragon Film Awards	Best New Director; Best Screenplay	Paradise Murdered	Won	
2007	28th Blue Dragon Film Awards	Best Screenplay	Paradise Murdered	Won	
2011	48th Grand Bell Awards	Best Film	War of the Arrows	Nominated	
2011	32nd Blue Dragon Film Awards	Best Film	War of the Arrows	Nominated	
2011	32nd Blue Dragon Film Awards	Best Director	War of the Arrows	Nominated	
2011	32nd Blue Dragon Film Awards	Audience Choice Award for Most Popular Film	War of the Arrows	Won	
2014	23rd Buil Film Awards	Best Film	The Admiral: Roaring Currents	Won	
2014	23rd Buil Film Awards	Best Director	The Admiral: Roaring Currents	Nominated	
2014	34th Korean Association of Film Critics Awards	Critics' Top 10	The Admiral: Roaring Currents	Won	
2014	51st Grand Bell Awards	Best Film	The Admiral: Roaring Currents	Won	
2014	51st Grand Bell Awards	Best Director	The Admiral: Roaring Currents	Nominated	
2014	51st Grand Bell Awards	Best Planning	The Admiral: Roaring Currents	Won	
2014	35th Blue Dragon Film Awards	Best Film	The Admiral: Roaring Currents	Nominated	
2014	35th Blue Dragon Film Awards	Best Director	The Admiral: Roaring Currents	Won	
2014	35th Blue Dragon Film Awards	Audience Choice Award for Most Popular Film	The Admiral: Roaring Currents	Won	
2015	10th Max Movie Awards	Best Film	The Admiral: Roaring Currents	Won	
2015	10th Max Movie Awards	Best Director	The Admiral: Roaring Currents	Nominated	
2015	10th Max Movie Awards	Best Trailer	The Admiral: Roaring Currents	Nominated	
2015	10th Max Movie Awards	Best Poster	The Admiral: Roaring Currents	Nominated	
2015	Chunsa Film Art Awards	Best Director (Grand Prix)	The Admiral: Roaring Currents	Nominated	
2015	51st Baeksang Arts Awards	Best Film	The Admiral: Roaring Currents	Nominated	
2023	59th Baeksang Arts Awards	Best Film	Hansan: Rising Dragon	Nominated	
2023	59th Baeksang Arts Awards	Best Director	Hansan: Rising Dragon	Nominated	
2022	43rd Blue Dragon Film Awards	Best Film	Hansan: Rising Dragon	Nominated	
2022	43rd Blue Dragon Film Awards	Best Screenplay	Hansan: Rising Dragon	Nominated	
2022	Buil Film Awards	Best Director	Hansan: Rising Dragon	Won	
2022	Buil Film Awards	Best Film	Hansan: Rising Dragon	Nominated	
2022	Chunsa Film Art Awards	Best Screenplay	Hansan: Rising Dragon	Won	
2022	Chunsa Film Art Awards	Best Director	Hansan: Rising Dragon	Nominated	
2023	Director's Cut Awards	Best Director in film	Hansan: Rising Dragon	Nominated	
2022	Grand Bell Awards	Best Director	Hansan: Rising Dragon	Nominated	
2022	Grand Bell Awards	Best Film	Hansan: Rising Dragon	Nominated	
2022	Grand Bell Awards	Best Screenplay	Hansan: Rising Dragon	Nominated	
2022	Korean Association of Film Critics Awards	Korean Association of Film 10 selections of Kim Hyun-seung	Hansan: Rising Dragon	Won	
2024	60th Baeksang Arts Awards	Best Film	Noryang: Deadly Sea	Nominated	
2024	60th Baeksang Arts Awards	Best Director	Noryang: Deadly Sea	Nominated	
