= The Admiral: Roaring Currents =

2014 South Korean war film

- Theatrical release poster
- Hangul: 명량
- Hanja: 鳴梁
- RR: Myeongnyang
- MR: Myŏngnyang
- Directed by: Kim Han-min
- Written by: Jeon Chul-hong; Kim Han-min
- Produced by: Kim Han-min
- Starring: Choi Min-sik; Ryu Seung-ryong; Cho Jin-woong
- Cinematography: Kim Tae-seong
- Edited by: Kim Chang-ju
- Music by: Kim Tae-seong
- Production company: Big Stone Pictures
- Distributed by: CJ Entertainment
- Release date: July 30, 2014
- Running time: 127 minutes
- Country: South Korea
- Languages: Korean; Japanese
- Budget: ₩14.8 billion
- Box office: US$138.3 million

The Admiral: Roaring Currents (Korean: 명량), or simply The Admiral, is a 2014 South Korean epic historical action-war film directed and co-written by Kim Han-min. Based on the historical Battle of Myeongnyang, it stars an ensemble cast led by Choi Min-sik as the Korean naval commander Yi Sun-sin. The film was released theatrically in South Korea on July 30, 2014.

The film recorded 10 million admissions only 12 days after its premiere and set a record in South Korea for achieving such a high number of viewers in the shortest amount of time. The movie also surpassed Avatar's record of 13 million viewers to become the most-watched and highest-grossing film of all time in South Korea with 17.6 million admissions and a worldwide gross of US$138.3 million.

A prequel, Hansan: Rising Dragon, was released in 2022 and a sequel, Noryang: Deadly Sea, was released in 2023.

== Plot ==
The film revolves around the titular Battle of Myeongryang around 1597, which is regarded as one of legendary Joseon Admiral Yi Sun-sin's most remarkable naval victories. He led only 12 ships under his command to a heroic victory against an invading Japanese fleet of 133 vessels.

At the onset of the battle at their base in Haenam, the Japanese invaders under Tōdō Takatora are confident that their planned expedition to Hansong to capture King Seonjo will be rather straightforward. However, they remain reserved over the news that Joseon's greatest admiral, Yi Sun-sin, has been restored to his former command after the disaster at Chilcheollyang, which has reduced the Korean navy to a mere dozen battle-ready ships. To ensure the success of the operation, Hideyoshi sends one of his finest naval war leaders to Joseon, Kurushima Michifusa, the commander of the Murakami Clan Navy who is an expert in naval combat but enjoys a shaky reputation among his fellow daimyō as a pirate. One of the admirals of the Japanese Left Army, Wakizaka, first meets Kurushima and his lieutenant, Kimura, while he finishes off the remnants of a group of Joseon soldiers. He especially distrusts Kurushima and draws his sword on him several times, especially after the latter insults him by shaming his defeat at Hansan Island. Later, Kurushima and Haru, his sharpshooter, drink sake as Kurushima elaborates on his personal vendetta against Yi Sun-sin, stating that his brother Michiyuki had been killed by the latter earlier in the war.

In the meantime, Yi Sun-sin is facing the despair mounting among his officers and troops. Facing an enemy force that far outnumbers them and seeing no reasonable chance of success in the inevitable clash even with one single turtle ship remaining, many consider the fight lost before it has even started. Despite his outwardly indifferent demeanor, Yi is hard-pressed to maintain morale among his men and desperate to find a solution to his problem. However, the breaking point seems to be reached when General Bae Seol, the deserter of Chilcheollyang, burns the turtle ship and has his men try to assassinate Yi. Although Yi escapes and Bae is killed for his act of treachery, the ship is lost, which boosts confidence among the Japanese and further dispirits Yi's troops. To seek an answer, Yi travels to the Myeongryang Strait, an area notorious for its strong and treacherous currents, which the Japanese intend to cross on their way to Hansong. Later, he confides in his son Hoe that to win the fight, he must turn the fear paralyzing his men into courage.

Upon hearing that the departure of the Japanese attack fleet is imminent, Yi abandons his base and moves to Usuyeong after burning the naval facilities to the ground. The next morning, Yi's fleet arrives in the strait and is shortly met by the Japanese, who are using the morning tide to move into the channel, with Kurushima leading the vanguard. Yi engages Kurushima's fleet in battle, but as the other Korean commanders are still hesitant to involve themselves, Yi's flagship is quickly surrounded and attacked by boarding parties. In the apparently hopeless situation, Yi commands several cannons to be fired from the rower deck's port hatches in a concentrated volley, to use their recoil to blast the ship free of its encirclement. As Yi had hoped, this bold act of survival inspires the rest of his countrymen to take the fight to the enemy.

When the tide turns and forms a whirlpool in the middle of the channel, thus solidifying Yi's defensive position, Kurushima orders an all-out attack with the rest of his ships. Despite the efforts of Haru and a ship loaded with black powder charges, the renewed courage of the Koreans prevails, though heavy sacrifices are made. Kurushima's desperate situation is observed by Todo, who merely laughs at Katō's suggestion of reinforcing him. Kurushima, realizing that he is now on his own, boards the Korean flagship but is decapitated by Yi himself after he takes several arrows from Korean archers, and his head is hung from the tip of the ship's mast.

When Yi's ship itself is caught in the whirlpool, his civilian navy servants and local fishermen courageously drag the vessel back to safety. Joined by the rest of the fleet, Yi leads a counterattack that deals the Japanese forces a crushing blow, forces them into retreat, and leaves the Koreans triumphant. The film ends with a reminiscence of the first encounter of the Japanese with the turtle ship in 1592.

== Historical background ==
The Battle of Myeongryang, on October 26, 1597, the Korean Joseon Kingdom's navy, led by Admiral Yi Sun-sin, fought the Japanese navy in the Myeongryang Strait, near Jindo Island, off the southwest corner of the Korean Peninsula.

With only 13 ships remaining from Admiral Wŏn Kyun's disastrous defeat at the Battle of Chilchonryang, Admiral Yi held the strait as a "last stand" battle against the Japanese navy, who were sailing to support their land army's advance towards the Joseon capital of Hanyang (modern-day Seoul).

== Cast ==
- Choi Min-sik as Yi Sun-sin
- Ryu Seung-ryong as Kurushima Michifusa
- Cho Jin-woong as Wakisaka Yasuharu
- Kim Myung-gon as Tōdō Takatora
- Jin Goo as Lim Jun-young, Yi Sun-sin's scout
- Lee Jung-hyun as Mrs. Jeong, Lim's wife
- Kwon Yul as Yi Hoe, Yi Sun-sin's son
- No Min-woo as Haru
- Kim Tae-hoon as Kim Jung-geol
- Lee Seung-joon as Captain Ahn
- Ryohei Otani as Junsa, a Japanese defector and spy for Yi Sun-sin
- Park Bo-gum as Bae Su-bong
- Kim Won-hae as Bae Seol
- Kim Kang-il as Katō Yoshiaki
- Lee Hae-yeong as Captain Song
- Jang Jun-nyeong as Lieutenant Nah
- Moon Yeong-dong as Kim Dol-son
- Yoo Soon-woong as Elder Kim
- Kim Gil-dong as Captain Hwang
- Choi Deok-moon as Captain Song
- Park No-sik as Captain Kim
- Kim Hyeon-tae as Ok-hyeong
- Kang Tae-young as Kimura
- Kim Gu-taek as Bae Hong-suk
- Joo Seok-tae as Katsura
- Jo Bok-rae as Oh Sang-goo
- Go Kyung-pyo as Oh Duk-yi
- Nam Kyung-eup as Kwon Yul

== Release ==
=== Dates ===
Country	Date Released	Release title
South Korea	30 July 2014	명량
US	15 August 2014	The Admiral
Vietnam	5 September 2014	Myeong-ryang
Netherlands	12 April 2015	Myeong-ryang
Germany	20 July 2015	Der Admiral: Roaring Currents
Japan	12 August 2015	バトル・オーシャン 海上決戦 ("Battle Ocean Kaijō Kessen")
Philippines	2 September	Myeong-ryang
Germany (extended version)	14 March 2016	Myeong-ryang
Brazil	August 2014	O Almirante: Correntes Furiosas

=== Credits ===
- CJ Entertainment (2014) (Korea) (theatrical)
- Big Stone Picture (2014) (Korea) (theatrical)
- Cj Entertainment (2014) (Korea) (theatrical)
- CJ CGV Viet Nam (2014) (Vietnam) (theatrical)
- CJ Entertainment America (2014) (USA) (theatrical)
- CJ Entertainment America (2014) (USA) (theatrical) (subtitled)
- CJ Entertainment (2014) (Worldwide) (theatrical)
- Min Gyo Tour (2014) (Australia) (theatrical)
- Viva International Pictures (2015) (Philippines) (theatrical)
- Madman Entertainment (2015) (Australia) (DVD)
- New KSM (2015) (Germany) (DVD)
- Twin Co. Ltd. (2015) (Japan) (DVD)

=== Festivals ===
Film Festival
13th Firenze Korea Film Festival (2015)
19th Busan International Film Festival (2014)
2nd Silk-Road International Film Festival (2015)

== Reception ==
=== Box office ===
==== South Korea ====
The Admiral: Roaring Currents drew 682,882 viewers on its first day in theaters on July 30, 2014, grossing US$4.77 million. This was the all-time highest opening day box office in South Korea, for both a foreign and domestic film, breaking the previous record set by Kundo: Age of the Rampant. It went on to set other new records: highest opening weekend, with 3.35 million admissions (US$25.94 million), surpassing Transformers: Dark of the Moon's record of 2.37 million (set in 2011) by 41%; biggest single day for a film in South Korean history with 1.25 million admissions (US$9.71 million); the first time that a film generated over ₩10 billion in a single day; and the quickest film to reach 10 million admissions.

By August 15, The Admiral: Roaring Currents became the all-time most-watched film in South Korea, breaking the previous record held by Hollywood blockbuster Avatar (13.62 million). By August 17, it became the first film to sell more than 14 million tickets in South Korean theaters and the first domestic film to exceed the US$100 million mark. At 17,607,820 admissions, it has grossed US$132 million in South Korea.

==== Korean Box Office Chart : ====
Date	Number of Screen	Number of play	Income	Viewers	Total Income	Total Viewers	Ranking
First day (07/30)	1,159	6,147	4,708,879,000	682,701	4,881,110,000	705,201	1
Second day (07/31)	1,202	6,258	5,243,409,900	705,070	10,124,519,900	1,410,271	1
Third day (08/01)	1,300	6,699	6,918,410,307	867,437	17,042,930,207	2,277,708	1
Fourth day (08/02)	1,494	7,605	9,826,541,209	1,232,529	26,869,471,416	3,510,237	1
Fifth day (08/03)	1,587	7,963	10,031,212,500	1,257,380	36,900,683,916	4,767,617	1
Sixth day (08/04)	1,443	7,551	7,455,501,400	990,022	44,356,185,316	5,757,639	1
Seventh day (08/05)	1,507	7,779	6,511,760,400	869,153	50,867,945,716	6,626,792	1
Eighth day (08/06)	1,221	6,788	5,273,445,400	702,887	56,141,391,116	7,329,679	1
Ninth day (08/07)	1,239	6,776	4,892,511,700	652,776	61,033,902,816	7,982,455	1
Tenth day (08/08)	1,278	7,026	5,493,530,692	690,123	66,527,433,508	8,672,578	1

==== Regional Total Viewers and Income ====
Region	Number of Screen	Total Income	Total Viewers
Gyeonggi-do	360	31,089,294,900 (22.9%)	4,051,862 (23.0%)
Gangwon-do	51	3,651,401,100 (2.7%)	485,685 (2.8%)
Chungcheongbuk-do	61	3,653,185,700 (2.7%)	497,938 (2.8%)
Chungcheongnam-do	52	4,117,556,000 (3.0%)	550,058 (3.1%)
Gyeongsangbuk-do	73	4,971,368,900 (3.7%)	631,366 (3.6%)
Gyeongsangnam-do	103	7,991,499,700 (5.9%)	1,043,045 (5.9%)
Jeollabuk-do	60	4,333,219,300 (3.2%)	581,423 (3.3%)
Jeollanam-do	39	2,814,587,500 (2.1%)	399,688 (2.3%)
Jeju	22	1,457,782,500 (1.1%)	191,760 (1.1%)
Busan	128	10,646,578,200 (7.8%)	1,384,083 (7.9%)
Daegu	112	7,925,679,600 (5.8%)	1,017,360 (5.8%)
Daejeon	43	4,782,608,000 (3.5%)	628,648 (3.6%)
Ulsan	28	3,066,071,200 (2.3%)	382,935 (2.2%)
Incheon	76	7,082,728,000 (5.2%)	902,944 (5.1%)
Gwangju	73	4,834,892,500 (3.6%)	671,037 (3.8%)
Sejong	5	209,480,000 (0.2%)	30,367 (0.2%)
Seoul	301	33,125,286,210 (24.4%)	4,164,840 (23.6%)

==== International ====
It opened in limited release across 30 theaters in North America, beginning August 15, 2014. Due to favorable reviews from critics and moviegoers, it expanded to 42 theaters on its second week, and its first week gross of US$1.18 million surpassed the previous record held by Masquerade (US$923,442) as the highest-grossing film directly distributed by a South Korean distributor. The film has grossed CN¥26.53 million in China, US$2,589,811 in the United States, and US$138.3 million internationally.

=== Critical response ===
==== Positive ====
- Naval battle scene
  - Song Ji-hyun wrote in The Korea Economic Daily that "61 minutes of naval battle scene was not boring at all."
  - Choi Su-moon wrote in the Seoul Economic Daily that "By only showing navy's efforts not chains, like a theory from historians, it upgraded the movie's quality."
  - Heo Ji-woong, in Seol Jeon, said that "61 minutes of naval battle scene is hard to figure out in Hollywood, and it was great."
- Amazing casts and acting ability
  - SBS funE's Kim Ji-hye said, "Nice casting and amazing acting ability upgraded the movie's quality. Actors feelings were well delivered."

==== Negative ====
- Kim Hyun-shik wrote in No Cut News that "Because it only followed history, there is no impact, although there are romance going on."
- MBN Yoo Myung-joon said that "The movie was so focused on Korean navy, especially Yi Sun-sin, and Japanese navy seemed insignificant."

=== Awards and nominations ===
Year	Award	Category	Recipient	Result
2014	23rd Buil Film Awards	Best Film	The Admiral: Roaring Currents	Won
2014	23rd Buil Film Awards	Best Director	Kim Han-min	Nominated
2014	23rd Buil Film Awards	Best Actor	Choi Min-sik	Nominated
2014	23rd Buil Film Awards	Best Supporting Actress	Lee Jung-hyun	Nominated
2014	23rd Buil Film Awards	Best Cinematography	Kim Tae-seong	Won
2014	23rd Buil Film Awards	Best Art Direction	Jang Choon-seob	Won
2014	23rd Buil Film Awards	Best Music	Kim Tae-seong	Nominated
2014	Asia Star Awards	Actor of the Year	Choi Min-sik	Won
2014	34th Korean Association of Film Critics Awards	Best Actor	Choi Min-sik	Won
2014	34th Korean Association of Film Critics Awards	Best Art Direction	Jang Choon-seob	Won
2014	34th Korean Association of Film Critics Awards	Critics' Top 10	The Admiral: Roaring Currents	Won
2014	51st Grand Bell Awards	Best Film	The Admiral: Roaring Currents	Won
2014	51st Grand Bell Awards	Best Director	Kim Han-min	Nominated
2014	51st Grand Bell Awards	Best Actor	Choi Min-sik	Won
2014	51st Grand Bell Awards	Best Cinematography	Kim Tae-seong	Nominated
2014	51st Grand Bell Awards	Best Lighting	Kim Gyeong-seok	Nominated
2014	51st Grand Bell Awards	Best Art Direction	Jang Choon-seob	Nominated
2014	51st Grand Bell Awards	Best Costume Design	Kwon Yu-jin, Im Seung-hee	Nominated
2014	51st Grand Bell Awards	Best Music	Kim Tae-seong	Nominated
2014	51st Grand Bell Awards	Technical Award	Yun Dae-won (special effects)	Won
2014	51st Grand Bell Awards	Best Planning	Kim Han-min	Won
2014	35th Blue Dragon Film Awards	Best Film	The Admiral: Roaring Currents	Nominated
2014	35th Blue Dragon Film Awards	Best Director	Kim Han-min	Won
2014	35th Blue Dragon Film Awards	Best Actor	Choi Min-sik	Nominated
2014	35th Blue Dragon Film Awards	Best Cinematography	Kim Tae-seong	Nominated
2014	35th Blue Dragon Film Awards	Best Lighting	Kim Gyeong-seok	Nominated
2014	35th Blue Dragon Film Awards	Best Art Direction	Jang Choon-seob	Nominated
2014	35th Blue Dragon Film Awards	Best Music	Kim Tae-seong	Nominated
2014	35th Blue Dragon Film Awards	Technical Award	Yun Dae-won (special effects)	Nominated
2014	35th Blue Dragon Film Awards	Audience Choice Award for Most Popular Film	The Admiral: Roaring Currents	Won
2015	6th KOFRA Film Awards	Best Actor	Choi Min-sik	Won
2015	10th Max Movie Awards	Best Film	The Admiral: Roaring Currents	Won
2015	10th Max Movie Awards	Best Director	Kim Han-min	Nominated
2015	10th Max Movie Awards	Best Actor	Choi Min-sik	Won
2015	10th Max Movie Awards	Best Supporting Actor	Ryu Seung-ryong	Nominated
2015	10th Max Movie Awards	Best Trailer	The Admiral: Roaring Currents	Nominated
2015	10th Max Movie Awards	Best Poster	The Admiral: Roaring Currents	Nominated
2015	20th Chunsa Film Art Awards	Best Director (Grand Prix)	Kim Han-min	Nominated
2015	20th Chunsa Film Art Awards	Best Actor	Choi Min-sik	Nominated
2015	20th Chunsa Film Art Awards	Technical Award	Choi Tae-young (sound)	Won
2015	9th Asian Film Awards	Best Actor	Choi Min-sik	Nominated
2015	51st Baeksang Arts Awards	Grand Prize (Daesang) for Film	Choi Min-sik	Won
2015	51st Baeksang Arts Awards	Best Film	The Admiral: Roaring Currents	Nominated
2015	51st Baeksang Arts Awards	Best Actor	Choi Min-sik	Nominated
2015	51st Baeksang Arts Awards	Best Supporting Actress	Lee Jung-hyun	Nominated

== Sequels ==
While producing The Admiral: Roaring Currents in 2013, Big Stone Pictures announced plans to produce two more films related to Yi Sun-sin if the first film was successful. It was later confirmed that the rest of the trilogy would be produced with Kim Han-min directing.

The second film in the trilogy, Hansan: Rising Dragon, was released in 2022 to box office success. It is based on the Battle of Hansan Island, with Park Hae-il playing Yi Sun-sin.

The third film of the trilogy, Noryang: Deadly Sea, based on the Battle of Noryang, was released in December 2023.
