= Steel Flower =

- Theatrical poster
- Directed by: Park Suk-young
- Written by: Park Suk-young
- Produced by: Bak Seong-jin
- Starring: Jeong Ha-dam
- Cinematography: Park Hyeong-ik; Oh Tae-Seung
- Edited by: Cho hyun-ju
- Music by: Kim Dong-ki
- Distributed by: IndieStory Inc.
- Release dates: October 2, 2015 (BIFF); April 7, 2016 (South Korea)
- Running time: 83 minutes
- Country: South Korea
- Language: Korean

Steel Flower (Korean: 스틸 플라워) is a 2015 South Korean film starring Jeong Ha-dam. Written and directed by Park Suk-young, it depicts the story of a young homeless girl struggling to make a living in Busan.

It made its world premiere at the 20th Busan International Film Festival in 2015. Since then, it has won numerous awards.

== Plot ==
A young homeless girl, Ha-dam, moves to Busan in the hopes of finding work, only to be rebuffed at every turn.

== Cast ==
- Jeong Ha-dam as Ha-dam
- Kim Tae-hee as Japanese restaurant owner
- Yu An as a woman who "hires" but fails to pay Ha-dam to hand out advertising leaflets
- Park Myung-hoon as seafood restaurant owner
- Choi Moon-soo as a woman who has an ugly physical confrontation Ha-dam

== Awards and nominations ==
| Year | Award | Category | Recipient | Result |
|---|---|---|---|---|
| 2015 | 41st Seoul Independent Film Festival | Grand Prize | Steel Flower | Won |
| 2015 | 41st Seoul Independent Film Festival | Independent Star Award | Jeong Ha-dam | Won |
| 2015 | Marrakech International Film Festival | Special Jury Prize | Steel Flower | Won |
| 2016 | 13th Florence Korea Film Fest | Best Film (Independent) | Steel Flower | Won |
| 2016 | 52nd Baeksang Arts Awards | Best New Actress (Film) | Jeong Ha-dam | Nominated |
| 2016 | 36th Korean Association of Film Critics Awards | Best New Actress | Jeong Ha-dam | Won |
| 2016 | 37th Blue Dragon Film Awards | Best New Actress | Jeong Ha-dam | Nominated |
| 2017 | 4th Wildflower Film Awards | Best Actress | Jeong Ha-dam | Won |

== Reception ==
Jeong Ha-dam was praised for her performance, with the film itself receiving overall positive critical reception.
