= Kim Sung-kyu (actor, born 1986) =

South Korean actor

- Born: January 6, 1986 (age 40); Gyeonggi, South Korea
- Education: Daejin University
- Occupation: Actor
- Years active: 2011–present
- Agent: Company On

Korean name
- Hangul: 김성규
- RR: Gim Seonggyu
- MR: Kim Sŏnggyu
- Website: Company On Official Website

Kim Sung-kyu (Korean: 김성규; born January 6, 1986) is a South Korean actor. He is best known for his roles in crime thriller The Outlaws (2017) and in the Netflix series Kingdom (2019). He won the Best New Actor award at the Golden Cinematography Awards for his performance in the film The Gangster, the Cop, the Devil (2019).

== Career ==
Kim began his acting career in a theater company at the age of twenty-seven, spanning approximately five years. During this period, he focused on original plays and adaptations of classics rather than commercial productions with mass appeal. He frequently portrayed complex, often heavy characters who navigated significant hardships, personal awakenings, or confronting death. To support himself, Kim held various part-time jobs, including working at a lunchbox shop and a supermarket, moving furniture for commercial buildings such as courthouses, and assisting with stage setup.

Kim's career breakthrough occurred with his role as the antagonist Yang-tae in the 2017 film The Outlaws. His portrayal was noted for his intense physical and psychological commitment to the role. Kim underwent a significant physical transformation, including shaving his eyebrows and losing over 5 kilograms. He aimed for a gaunt, perpetually "hungry" appearance, achieved by walking extensively and frequenting saunas. This dedication was recognized by the film's production and makeup teams, who commended his collaborative approach to character design. Contrasting this with his earlier film works, Kim noted that he found the complexity of Yang-tae's character to be particularly compelling.

== Filmography ==
=== Film ===
Year	Title	Role	Notes	Ref.
2011	Nineteen Ninety Nine	Lee Sang-man	Short film	
2012	family is…	brother	Short film	
2012	Beloved	Unknown	Short film	
2014	The Con Artists	Detective team 2 member		
2016	Tunnel	Civic group member 3		
2017	The Outlaws	Yang-tae		
2018	The Accidental Detective 2: In Action	Lee Dae-hyun		
2019	The Gangster, The Cop, The Devil	Kang Kyung-ho		
2022	Hansan: Rising Dragon	Junsa		
2023	Noryang: Deadly Sea	Junsa		

=== Television series ===
Year	Title	Role	Notes	Ref.
2019–2020	Kingdom	Yeong-shin	Season 1–2	
2020	A Piece of Your Mind	Kang In-wook		
2021	One Ordinary Day	Do Ji-tae		
2022	The King of Pigs	Jung Jong-seok		
2023	Revenant	Lee Ok-gyu	Cameo (Episode 1)	
2024	Pachinko	Kim Chang-ho	Season 2	
2026	Agent Kim Reactivated	Kang Seong		

== Theater ==
Theater play performances of Kim
Year	Title		Role	Venue (Note: All venues are in Seoul unless stated otherwise)	Date	Ref.
Year	English	Korean	Role	Venue	Date	Ref.
2011	12 Men	12인	Jury No.8	Miarigogae Art Theater	September 6–10, 2011	
2013	Ctrl A (28)	컨트롤A씨28세	A			
2015–2016	Ancient Futures	오래된 미래	Second Child			
2016	Planaria	플라나리아	Man	Daehakro Hyewadang Small Theater	October 13–19, 2016	
2017	2017 Miryang Summer Performing Arts Festival - Planaria	2017 밀양여름공연예술축제 - 플라나리아	Man	Miryang Marina Studio Theater 2	July 30–31, 2017	
2026	Secret Passage: Interval	비밀통로 : Interval	Dong-jae	NOL Theater, Middle Theater	February 13 – May 3, 2026	

== Accolades ==
=== Awards and nominations ===
Name of the award ceremony, year presented, category, nominee of the award, and the result of the nomination
Award ceremony	Year	Category	Nominee / Work	Result	Ref.
Baeksang Arts Awards	2018	Best New Actor – Film	The Outlaws	Nominated	
Grand Bell Awards	2020	Best Supporting Actor	The Gangster, The Cop, The Devil	Nominated	
Golden Cinematography Awards	2021	Best New Actor	The Gangster, The Cop, The Devil	Won	
The Seoul Awards	2018	Best New Actor (film)	The Outlaws	Nominated	

=== Listicles ===
Name of publisher, year listed, name of listicle, and placement
Publisher	Year	Listicle	Placement	Ref.
Korean Film Council	2021	Korean Actors 200 (Note: The list introduces the 200 actors that best represent the present and future of Korean cinema to the people in the film industry all over the world.)	Included	
