= Buil Film Awards =

South Korean Film Awards

- Current: 34th Buil Film Awards
- Awarded for: Excellence in cinematic achievements
- Country: South Korea
- Presented by: Busan Ilbo
- First award: 1958
- Website: https://builfilm.busan.com/about

The Buil Film Awards (Korean: 부일영화상) is a South Korean film awards ceremony hosted by the Busan Ilbo newspaper. It began in 1958 as one of the earliest film awards in the country. During the 1950s and 1960s, it was the biggest film awards event in the Busan region, and was held annually until 1973. The event went into a 34-year hiatus from 1974 to 2007 when the film industry lost its appeal due to government censorship and the burgeoning television industry.

== Award ceremonies ==
After an absence of 23 years, the awards were revived when the 17th Buil Film Awards took place on October 9, 2008 at the Grand Hotel in Haeundae District, Busan. It was one of the highlights of the 13th Busan International Film Festival.

The 30th Buil Film Awards was held on October 7, 2021 at the Busan Exhibition and Convention Center (BEXCO Auditorium) in Busan. The highlight of this year's awards was inclusion of Over-the-top (OTT) films such as The Call and Night in Paradise for the first time.

The 31st Buil Film Awards was held on October 6, 2022, It was hosted by Kim Nam-gil and Choi Soo-young. Park Chan-wook's Decision to Leave won 5 awards including the best film award.

The 32nd Buil Film Awards was held on October 5, 2023, It was hosted by Esom. Um Tae-hwa's Concrete Utopia won 4 awards including the best film award.

The 33rd Buil Film Awards was held on October 3, 2024, The awards were announced in a ceremony hosted by South Korean actors Kim Dong-wook and Go Ah-sung.

The 34th Buil Film Awards was held on September 18, 2025. The awards were announced in a ceremony hosted by South Korean actor Kim Nam-gil and actress Chun Woo-hee. House of the Seasons was awarded the best film, whereas Lee Byung-hun and Kim Go-eun were the winners of the best actor and the best actress award respectively.

The 35th Buil Film Awards will be held on October 7, 2026.

== Categories ==
- Best Film
- Best Director
- Best Leading Actor
- Best Leading Actress
- Best Supporting Actor
- Best Supporting Actress
- Best New Director
- Best New Actor
- Best New Actress
- Best Screenplay
- Best Cinematography
- Best Art Direction
- Best Music
- Buil Readers' Jury Award (via internet voting)
- Yu Hyun-mok Film Arts Award
- Best Foreign Film

== Best Film ==
#	Year	Film	Director
1	1958	The Lost Youth	Yu Hyun-mok
2	1959	The Life Seized	Yu Hyun-mok
3	1960	Defiance of a Teenager	Kim Ki-young
4	1961	Romance Papa	Shin Sang-ok
5	1962	The Houseguest and My Mother	Shin Sang-ok
6	1963	Only for You	Yu Hyun-mok
7	1964	Goryeojang	Kim Ki-young
8	1965	Extra Human Being	Yu Hyun-mok
9	1966	The Sea Village	Kim Soo-yong
10	1967	Late Autumn	Lee Man-hee
11	1968	Flame in the Valley	Kim Soo-yong
12	1969	Descendants of Cain	Yu Hyun-mok
13	1970	The Old Jar Craftsman	Choi Ha-won
14	1971	Frozen Spring	Jung Jin-woo
15	1972	Bun-rye's Story	Yu Hyun-mok
16	1973	Oyster Village	Jung Jin-woo
17	2008	Night and Day	Hong Sang-soo
18	2009	Mother	Bong Joon-ho
19	2010	Poetry	Lee Chang-dong
20	2011	The Front Line	Jang Hoon
21	2012	A Muse	Jung Ji-woo
22	2013	Snowpiercer	Bong Joon-ho
23	2014	The Admiral: Roaring Currents	Kim Han-min
24	2015	The Shameless	Oh Seung-uk
25	2016	Veteran	Ryoo Seung-wan
26	2017	A Taxi Driver	Jang Hoon
27	2018	The Spy Gone North	Yoon Jong-bin
28	2019	Parasite	Bong Joon-ho
29	2020	House of Hummingbird	Kim Bora
30	2021	Escape from Mogadishu	Ryoo Seung-wan
31	2022	Decision to Leave	Park Chan-wook
32	2023	Concrete Utopia	Um Tae-hwa
33	2024	Revolver	Oh Seung-uk
34	2025	House of the Seasons	Oh Jung-min

== Best Director ==
#	Year	Director	Film
1	1958	Yu Hyun-mok	The Lost Youth
2	1959	Yu Hyun-mok	The Life Seized
3	1960	Kim Ki-young	Defiance of a Teenager
4	1961	Lee Seong-gu	A Young Look
5	1962	Shin Sang-ok	The Houseguest and My Mother
6	1963	Yu Hyun-mok	Only for You
7	1964	Kim Ki-young	Goryeojang
8	1965	Yu Hyun-mok	Extra Human Being
9	1966	Kim Soo-yong	The Sea Village
10	1967	Lee Man-hee	Late Autumn
11	1968	Kim Soo-yong	Mist
12	1969	Jung So-young	Love Me Once Again
13	1970	Jung So-young	Forgotten Woman
14	1971	Jung Jin-woo	Frozen Spring
15	1972	Yu Hyun-mok	Bun-rye's Story
16	1973	Jung Jin-woo	Oyster Village
17	2008	Na Hong-jin	The Chaser
18	2009	Yoon Je-kyoon	Haeundae
19	2010	Hong Sang-soo	Ha Ha Ha
20	2011	Kim Tae-yong	Late Autumn
21	2012	Lee Han	Punch
22	2013	Ryoo Seung-wan	The Berlin File
23	2014	Hong Sang-soo	Our Sunhi
24	2015	Kwak Kyung-taek	The Classified File
25	2016	Lee Joon-ik	Dongju: The Portrait of a Poet
26	2017	Kim Sung-su	Asura: The City of Madness
27	2018	Lee Chang-dong	Burning
28	2019	Kim Tae-gyun	Dark Figure of Crime
29	2020	Jung Ji-woo	Tune in for Love
30	2021	Lee Joon-ik	The Book of Fish
31	2022	Kim Han-min	Hansan: Rising Dragon
32	2023	Jung Ju-ri	Next Sohee
33	2024	Kim Sung-su	12.12: The Day
34	2025	Hwang Byeong-guk	Yadang: The Snitch

== Best Actor ==
#	Year	Actor	Film
1	1958	Kim Seung-ho	The Wedding Day
2	1959	Kim Seung-ho	The Life Seized
3	1960	Kim Jin-kyu	There Is No Tragedy
4	1961	Kim Jin-kyu	Mr. Park
5	1962	Kim Jin-kyu	Seong Chun-hyang
6	1963	Shin Young-kyun	Prince Yeonsan
7	1964	Shin Seong-il	Private Tutor
8	1965	Kim Jin-kyu	Deaf Sam-yong
9	1966	Shin Seong-il	Heukmaek
10	1967	Shin Young-kyun	A Water Mill
11	1968	Park No-sik	When the Buckwheat Flowers Blossom
12	1969	Kim Jin-kyu	Descendants of Cain
13	1970	Hwang Hae	The Old Jar Craftsman
14	1971	Namkoong Won	Pilnyeo
15	1972	Lee Soon-jae	Bun-rye's Story
16	1973	Kim Hee-ra	Oyster Village
17	2008	Kim Yoon-seok	The Chaser
18	2009	Ha Jung-woo	My Dear Enemy
19	2010	Jung Jae-young	Moss
20	2011	Ryoo Seung-bum	The Unjust
21	2012	Choi Min-sik	Nameless Gangster: Rules of the Time
22	2013	Hwang Jung-min	New World
23	2014	Song Kang-ho	The Attorney
24	2015	Lee Jung-jae	Assassination
25	2016	Lee Byung-hun	Inside Men
26	2017	Song Kang-ho	A Taxi Driver
27	2018	Lee Sung-min	The Spy Gone North
28	2019	Gi Ju-bong	Hotel by the River
29	2020	Lee Byung-hun	The Man Standing Next
30	2021	Yoo Ah-in	Voice of Silence
31	2022	Park Hae-il	Decision to Leave
32	2023	Lee Byung-hun	Concrete Utopia
33	2024	Jung Woo-sung	12.12: The Day

== Best Actress ==
#	Year	Actress	Film
1	1958	Ju Jeung-ryu	The Star of Lost Paradise
2	1959	Choi Eun-hee	A Flower in Hell
3	1960	Jo Mi-ryeong	Defiance of a Teenager
4	1961	Moon Jung-suk	Soil
5	1962	Choi Eun-hee	The Houseguest and My Mother
6	1963	Lee Min-ja	Only for You
7	1964	Kim Ji-mee	Blood Relation
8	1965	Kim Hye-jeong	Wife's Confession
9	1966	Choi Eun-hee	The Sino-Japanese War and Queen Min the Heroine
10	1967	Moon Jung-suk	Late Autumn
11	1968	Ju Jeung-ryu	Flame in the Valley
12	1969	Moon Hee	Descendants of Cain
13	1970	Jeon Gye-hyeon	Forgotten Woman
14	1971	Yoon Jeong-hee	First Experience
15	1972	Kim Ji-mee	
16	1973	Yoon Jeong-hee	Oyster Village
17	2008	Soo Ae	Sunny
18	2009	Kim Hye-ja	Mother
19	2010	Moon So-ri	Ha Ha Ha
20	2011	Jung Yu-mi	Oki's Movie
21	2012	Kim Min-hee	Helpless
22	2013	Han Hyo-joo	Cold Eyes
23	2014	Shim Eun-kyung	Miss Granny
24	2015	Jeon Do-yeon	The Shameless
25	2016	Son Ye-jin	The Truth Beneath
26	2017	Youn Yuh-jung	The Bacchus Lady
27	2018	Kim Hee-ae	Herstory
28	2019	Jeon Do-yeon	Birthday
29	2020	Jung Yu-mi	Kim Ji-young: Born 1982
30	2021	Jeon Jong-seo	The Call
31	2022	Tang Wei	Decision to Leave
32	2023	Kim Seo-hyung	Green House
33	2024	Kim Geum-soon	Jeong-sun

== Best Supporting Actor ==
#	Year	Actor	Film
17	2008	Kim Min-jun	A Love
18	2009	Kim In-kwon	Haeundae
19	2010	Yoo Jun-sang	Ha Ha Ha
20	2011	Ko Chang-seok	The Front Line
21	2012	Cho Jin-woong	Nameless Gangster: Rules of the Time
22	2013	Ryu Seung-ryong	Masquerade
23	2014	Kwak Do-won	The Attorney
24	2015	Lee Geung-young	Minority Opinion
25	2016	Kim Eui-sung	Train to Busan
26	2017	Kim Hee-won	The Merciless
27	2018	Ju Ji-hoon	The Spy Gone North
28	2019	Park Myung-hoon	Parasite
29	2020	Lee Hee-joon	The Man Standing Next
30	2021	Huh Joon-ho	Escape from Mogadishu
31	2022	Yim Si-wan	Emergency Declaration
32	2023	Kim Jong-soo	Smugglers
33	2024	Song Joong-ki	Hopeless

== Best Supporting Actress ==
#	Year	Actress	Film
17	2008	Kim Hae-sook	Open City
18	2009	Kim Bo-yeon	Possessed
19	2010	Youn Yuh-jung	The Housemaid
20	2011	Kim Yeo-jin	Children...
21	2012	Park Ji-young	The Concubine
22	2013	Jang Young-nam	A Werewolf Boy
23	2014	Kim Young-ae	The Attorney
24	2015	Moon Jeong-hee	Cart
25	2016	Park So-dam	The Priests
26	2017	Kim Su-an	The Battleship Island
27	2018	Kim Sun-young	Herstory
28	2019	Lee Jung-eun	Parasite
29	2020	Lee Re	Peninsula
30	2021	Kim Sun-young	Three Sisters
31	2022	Lee Soo-kyung	Miracle: Letters to the President
32	2023	Go Min-si	Smugglers
33	2024	Lim Ji-yeon	Revolver

== Best New Director ==
#	Year	Director	Film
17	2008	Oh Joum-kyun	Viva! Love
18	2009	Yang Ik-june	Breathless
19	2010	Ounie Lecomte	A Brand New Life
20	2011	Park Jung-bum	The Journals of Musan
21	2012	Lee Kwang-kuk	Romance Joe
22	2013	Kim Byung-woo	The Terror Live
23	2014	July Jung	A Girl at My Door
24	2015	Hong Seok-jae	Socialphobia
25	2016	Yoon Ga-eun	The World of Us
26	2017	Lee Hyun-ju	Our Love Story
27	2018	Jeon Go-woon	Microhabitat
28	2019	Kim Ui-seok	After My Death
29	2020	Jo Min Jae	Tiny Light
30	2021	Hong Eui-jeong	Voice of Silence
31	2022	Lee Jung-jae	Hunt
32	2023	Lee Ji-eun	The Hill of Secrets
33	2024	Lee Jeong-hong	A Wild Roomer

== Best New Actor ==
#	Year	Actor	Film
17	2008	Im Ji-kyu	Milky Way Liberation Front, Who's That Knocking at My Door?
18	2009	So Ji-sub	Rough Cut
19	2010	Song Sae-byeok	The Servant
20	2011	Lee Je-hoon	The Front Line
21	2012	Kim Sung-kyun	Nameless Gangster: Rules of the Time
22	2013	Kim Jun-gu	The Ugly Duckling
23	2014	Lee Joo-seung	Shuttlecock
24	2015	Byun Yo-han	Socialphobia
25	2016	Tae In-ho	Shadow Island
26	2017	Koo Kyo-hwan	Jane
27	2018	Kim Choong-gil	Loser's Adventure
28	2019	Sung Yu-bin	Last Child
29	2020	Kim Dae Geon	Clean Up
30	2021	Ha Jun	Festival
31	2022	Lee Hyo-je	Good Person
32	2023	Kim Seon-ho	The Childe

== Best New Actress ==
#	Year	Actress	Film
17	2008	Yoo Yeon-mi	With a Girl of Black Soil
18	2009	Seo Woo	Crush and Blush
19	2010	Kim Sae-ron	A Brand New Life
20	2011	Kang So-ra	Sunny
21	2012	Kim Go-eun	A Muse
22	2013	Jung Eun-chae	Nobody's Daughter Haewon
23	2014	Lim Ji-yeon	Obsessed
24	2015	Lee Yoo-young	Late Spring
25	2016	Kim Tae-ri	The Handmaiden
26	2017	Choi Hee-seo	Anarchist from Colony
27	2018	Kim Da-mi	The Witch: Part 1. The Subversion
28	2019	Jeon Yeo-been	After My Death
29	2020	Kang Mal-geum	Lucky Chan-sil
30	2021	Lee Yoo-mi	Young Adult Matters
31	2022	Choi Sung-eun	Ten Months
32	2023	Kim Si-eun	Next Sohee

== Best Screenplay ==
#	Year	Screenwriter	Film
17	2008	Kim Hyun-seok	Scout
18	2009	Yoon Je-kyoon	Haeundae
19	2010	Lee Chang-dong	Poetry
20	2011	Yook Sang-hyo	He's on Duty
21	2012	Lee Yong-ju	Architecture 101
22	2013	Kim Byung-woo	The Terror Live
23	2014	Shin Yeon-shick	The Russian Novel
24	2015	Kim Sung-je, Son A-ram	Minority Opinion
25	2016	Shin Yeon-shick	Dongju: The Portrait of a Poet
26	2017	Hwang Seong-gu	Anarchist from Colony
27	2018	Kwon Sung-hwi, Yoon Jong-bin	The Spy Gone North
28	2019	Bong Joon-ho, Han Jin Won	Parasite
29	2020	Kim Bora	House of Hummingbird
30	2021	Lee Gi-cheol, Ryoo Seung-wan	Escape from Mogadishu
31	2022	Jung Wook	Good Person
32	2023	Kim Sae-in	The Apartment with Two Women

== Best Cinematography ==
#	Year	Cinematographer	Film
17	2008	Lee Mo-gae	The Good, the Bad, the Weird
18	2009	Hong Kyung-pyo	Mother
19	2010	Kim Woo-hyung	Paju
20	2011	Kim Tae-seong, Park Jong-chul	War of the Arrows
21	2012	Choi Young-hwan	The Thieves
22	2013	Hong Kyung-pyo	Snowpiercer
23	2014	Kim Tae-seong	The Admiral: Roaring Currents
24	2015	Hong Kyung-pyo	Haemoo
25	2016	Choi Young-hwan	Veteran
26	2017	Park Jung-hun	The Villainess
27	2018	Kim Woo-hyung	1987: When the Day Comes
28	2019	Hong Kyung-pyo	Parasite
29	2020	Hong Kyung-pyo	Deliver Us from Evil
30	2021	Choi Young-hwan	Escape from Mogadishu
31	2022	Kim Ji-yong	Decision to Leave
32	2023	Cho Hyung-rae	Concrete Utopia

== Best Art Direction ==
#	Year	Art Director	Film
17	2008	Cho Hwa-sung	The Good, the Bad, the Weird
18	2009	Jo Sang-gyeong	Modern Boy
19	2010	Kang Seung-yong	Blades of Blood
20	2011	Ryu Seong-hee	The Front Line
21	2012	Lee Ha-jun	The Thieves
22	2013	Ondrej Nekvasil	Snowpiercer
23	2014	Jang Choon-seob	The Admiral: Roaring Currents
24	2015	Ryu Seong-hee	Assassination
25	2016	Ryu Seong-hee	The Handmaiden
26	2017	Lee Hwo-kyung	The Battleship Island
27	2018	Park Il-hyun	The Spy Gone North
28	2019	Park Il-hyun	Swing Kids
29	2020	Lee Geon Moon	Deliver Us from Evil
30	2021	Jeong Seong-jin, Jeong Chol-min	Space Sweepers
31	2022	Jeong Seong-jin, Jeong Chol-min	Hansan: Rising Dragon
32	2023	Jin Jong-hyun	The Moon

== Best Music ==
#	Year	Composer	Film
17	2008	Bang Jun-seok	Sunny, Eye for an Eye
18	2009	Lee Byung-woo	Mother
19	2010	Shim Hyun-jung	The Man from Nowhere
20	2011	Lee Ji-soo	Leafie, A Hen into the Wild
21	2012	Kim Hong-jib	The Taste of Money
22	2013	Jo Yeong-wook	The Berlin File
23	2014	Jo Yeong-wook	Kundo: Age of the Rampant
24	2015	Jo Yeong-wook	The Shameless
25	2016	Mowg	Dongju: The Portrait of a Poet
26	2017	Flash Flood Darlings	Jane
27	2018	Mowg	Burning
28	2019	Jung Jae-il	Parasite
29	2020	Yeon Ri Mok	Tune in for Love
30	2021	Jun-seok Bang	Escape from Mogadishu
31	2022	Jo Yeong-wook	Decision to Leave
32	2023	Dalpalan	Phantom
34	2025	Kim Joon-seok	Hi-Five

== Buil Readers' Jury Award ==
#	Year	Film	Director
17	2008	The Chaser	Na Hong-jin
18	2009	Take Off	Kim Yong-hwa
19	2010	The Man from Nowhere	Lee Jeong-beom
20	2011	War of the Arrows	Kim Han-min
21	2012	The Thieves	Choi Dong-hoon
22	2013	Masquerade	Choo Chang-min
23	2014	The Attorney	Yang Woo-suk
24	2015	Ode to My Father	Yoon Je-kyoon
25	2016	The Handmaiden	Park Chan-wook
26	2017	A Taxi Driver	Jang Hoon

== Yu Hyun-mok Film Arts Award ==
#	Year	Recipient	Film
18	2009	Yim Soon-rye	
19	2010	Shim Jae-myung	
20	2011	Kang Woo-suk	
21	2012	Hong Sang-soo	
22	2013	O Muel	Jiseul
23	2014	Kim Dong-won	
24	2015	Im Heung-soon	Factory Complex
24	2015	Kim Min-kyung	Factory Complex
25	2016	Yeon Sang-ho	Train to Busan
26	2017	Kim Ji-seok	—N/a
27	2018	—N/a	—N/a
28	2019	Jung Sung Il	—N/a
29	2020	Kim Il Kwon	—N/a
30	2021	Chun-yeon Lee	
31	2022	Lee Ran-hee	
32	2023	Bae Doona	Next Sohee

== Other Awards ==
#	Year	Category	Recipient	Film
17	2008	Best Editing	Kim Sun-min	The Chaser, Hellcats, Who's That Knocking at My Door?
17	2008	Best Lighting	Choi Chul-soo	M
17	2008	Technical Award	Jeong Do-an	The Good, the Bad, the Weird
17	2008	Achievement Award in Film Development	Shin Seong-il	—N/a
17	2008	Special Jury Prize	Ji Jung-hyeon	The Good, the Bad, the Weird
18	2009	Best Dressed	So Ji-sub	—N/a
20	2011	Best Dressed	Lee Je-hoon	—N/a
Star of the year award
28	2019	Popular Star Award (Male)	Doh Kyung-soo	Swing Kids
28	2019	Popular Star Award (Female)	Im Yoon-ah	Exit
29	2020	Popular Star Award (Male)	Kang Dong-won	Peninsula
29	2020	Popular Star Award (Female)	Seo Yea-ji	By Quantum Physics: A Nightlife Venture
30	2021	Popular Star Award (Male)	Zo In-sung	Escape from Mogadishu
30	2021	Popular Star Award (Female)	Esom	Samjin Company English Class
31	2022	Popular Star Award (Male)	Byun Yo-han	Hansan: Rising Dragon
31	2022	Popular Star Award (Female)	Lee Ji-eun	Broker
32	2023	Star of the Year Award (Male)	Doh Kyung-soo	The Moon
32	2023	Star of the Year Award (Female)	Park Bo-young	Concrete Utopia
34	2025	Star of the Year Award (Male)	Lee Joon-hyuk	
34	2025	Star of the Year Award (Female)	Lee Hye-ri	Victory

== Best Foreign Film ==
#	Year	Film	Director
1	1958	La Strada	Federico Fellini
2	1959	Gervaise	René Clément
3	1960	A Man Escaped	Robert Bresson
4	1961	The Last Bridge	Helmut Käutner
5	1962	Purple Noon	René Clément
6	1963	The Bridge on the River Kwai	David Lean
7	1964	General Della Rovere	Roberto Rossellini
8	1965	L'Eclisse	Michelangelo Antonioni
9	1966	The Umbrellas of Cherbourg	Jacques Demy
10	1967	To Kill a Mockingbird	Robert Mulligan
11	1968	West Side Story	Robert Wise, Jerome Robbins
12	1969	A Man and a Woman	Claude Lelouch
13	1970	The Sound of Music	Robert Wise
14	1971	The Arrangement	Elia Kazan
15	1972	Oliver!	Carol Reed
16	1973	The French Connection	William Friedkin

- Note: the whole list above is sourced.
