= Blue Dragon Film Award for Best Screenplay =

- Awarded for: Best Screenplay
- Country: South Korea
- Presented by: Blue Dragon Film Awards
- First award: 1963
- Website: www.blueaward.co.kr

The Blue Dragon Film Award for Best Screenplay is one of the awards that is presented annually at the Blue Dragon Film Awards by Sports Chosun, which is typically held at the end of the year.

== Winners ==
=== 1960s ===
#	Year	Screenwriter	Film
1	1963	Im Hee-jae	Kinship
2	1964	Kim Kang-yoon	Red Scarf
3	1965	Han Woon-sa	The North and South (남과 북)
4	1966	Han Woo-jeong	A Hero without a Serial Number (군번 없는 용사)
5	1967	Shin Bong-seung	Flame in the Valley
6	1969	Lee Sang-hyeon	School Excursion (수학여행)

=== 1970s ===
#	Year	Screenwriter	Film
7	1970	Shin Bong-seung	Spring, Spring (봄 봄)
8	1971	Kim Soo-hyun	Pilnyeo
9	1972	Na Han-bong, Na Yeon-sook	A Hotel Room (여창)
10	1973	Yoon Sam-yook	Me, Myself and I (나와 나)

=== 1990s ===
#	Year	Screenwriter	Film
11	1990	Yun Dae-seong	All That Falls Has Wings
12	1991	Yoo Woo-jae, Jang Gil-su	Susanne Brink's Arirang
13	1992	Park Heon-su	Marriage Story
14	1993	Lee Myung-se	First Love (첫사랑)
15	1994	Yook Sang-hyo	Rosy Life (장미빛 인생)
16	1995	Lee Seo-gun	301, 302
17	1996	Choi Moon-hee	Corset (코르셋)
18	1997	Song Neung-han	No. 3
19	1998	Hong Sang-soo	The Power of Kangwon Province
20	1999	Lee Jeong-hyang	Art Museum by the Zoo

=== 2000s ===
#	Year	Screenwriter	Film
21	2000	Lee Chang-dong	Peppermint Candy
22	2001	Go Eun-nim	Bungee Jumping of Their Own
23	2002	Park Jung-woo	Jail Breakers
24	2003	Park Chan-ok	Jealousy Is My Middle Name
25	2004	Choi Dong-hoon	The Big Swindle
26	2005	Han Jae-rim, Go Yoon-hee	Rules of Dating
27	2006	Lee Hae-young, Lee Hae-jun	Like a Virgin
28	2007	Kim Han-min	Paradise Murdered
29	2008	Lee Kyoung-mi, Park Chan-wook	Crush and Blush
30	2009	Lee Yong-ju	Possessed

=== 2010s ===
#	Year	Screenwriter	Film
31	2010	Kim Hyun-seok	Cyrano Agency
32	2011	Park Hoon-jung	The Unjust
33	2012	Yoon Jong-bin	Nameless Gangster: Rules of the Time
34	2013	Kim Ji-hye, Jo Joong-hoon	Hope
35	2014	Kim Seong-hun	A Hard Day
36	2015	Kim Sung-je, Son A-ram	Minority Opinion
37	2016	Shin Yeon-shick	Dongju: The Portrait of a Poet
38	2017	Hwang Dong-hyuk	The Fortress
39	2018	Kwak Kyung-taek, Kim Tae-kyun	Dark Figure of Crime
40	2019	Kim Bora	House of Hummingbird

=== 2020s ===
#	Year	Screenwriter	Film
41	2020	Lim Dae-hyung	Moonlit Winter
42	2021	Kim Se-gyeom	The Book of Fish
43	2022	Park Chan-wook, Jeong Seo-kyeong	Decision to Leave
44	2023	Jung Joo-ri	Next Sohee
45	2024	Jung Mi-young, Cho Hyun-chul	The Dream Songs
46	2025	Kim Hyung-joo, Yoon Jong-bin	The Match

== General references ==
- "Winners and nominees lists". Blue Dragon Film Awards (in Korean). Archived from the original on 27 January 2022.
- "Blue Dragon Film Awards". Naver (in Korean).
