= 52nd Baeksang Arts Awards =

2016 edition of award ceremony

- Date: June 3, 2016
- Site: Grand Peace Hall, Kyung Hee University, Seoul
- Hosted by: Shin Dong-yup; Bae Suzy
- Organised by: Ilgan Sports; JTBC Plus

Highlights
- Grand Prize – Film: Lee Joon-ik (director) – Dongju: The Portrait of a Poet, The Throne
- Grand Prize – TV: Descendants of the Sun (drama)
- Website: baeksangartsawards

Television/radio coverage
- Network: JTBC

The 52nd Baeksang Arts Awards (Korean: 제52회 백상예술대상) ceremony was held on June 3, 2016, at Grand Peace Hall, Kyung Hee University in Seoul. It was broadcast live on JTBC and was hosted by Shin Dong-yup and Bae Suzy. Organised by Ilgan Sports and JTBC Plus, it is South Korea's only awards ceremony which recognises excellence in both film and television.

== Winners and nominees ==
- Winners are listed first and highlighted in **boldface**.
  - Nominees

=== Film ===
**Grand Prize**
**Lee Joon-ik (director) – Dongju: The Portrait of a Poet, The Throne**
**Best Film**	**Best Director**
**Assassination**; Dongju: The Portrait of a Poet; Fourth Place; Inside Men; Veteran	**Ryoo Seung-wan – Veteran**; Choi Dong-hoon – Assassination; Lee Joon-ik – Dongju: The Portrait of a Poet; Oh Seung-wook – The Shameless; Woo Min-ho – Inside Men
**Best New Director**	**Best Screenplay**
**Han Jun-hee – Coin Locker Girl**; Ahn Gooc-jin – Alice in Earnestland; Choi Seung-yeun – Su Saek; Hong Won-chan – Office; Kim Sung-je – Minority Opinion	**Ahn Gooc-jin – Alice in Earnestland**; Choi Dong-hoon – Assassination; Kwak Kyung-taek, Han Seung-woon – The Classified File; Ryoo Seung-wan – Veteran; Shin Yeon-shick – Dongju: The Portrait of a Poet
**Best Actor**	**Best Actress**
**Lee Byung-hun – Inside Men**; Baek Yoon-sik – Inside Men; Hwang Jung-min – Veteran; Song Kang-ho – The Throne; Yoo Ah-in – The Throne	**Jeon Do-yeon – The Shameless**; Han Hyo-joo – The Beauty Inside; Jun Ji-hyun – Assassination; Kim Hye-soo – Coin Locker Girl; Lee Jung-hyun – Alice in Earnestland
**Best Supporting Actor**	**Best Supporting Actress**
**Lee Geung-young – Minority Opinion**; Bae Seong-woo – Office; Cho Jin-woong – Assassination; Oh Dal-su – Veteran; Uhm Tae-goo – Coin Locker Girl	**Ra Mi-ran – The Himalayas**; Jang Young-nam – The Classified File; Jeon Hye-jin – The Throne; Ryu Hyun-kyung – Office; Uhm Ji-won – The Silenced
**Best New Actor**	**Best New Actress**
**Park Jung-min – Dongju: The Portrait of a Poet**; Go Kyung-pyo – Coin Locker Girl; Park Bo-gum – Coin Locker Girl; Park Seo-joon – The Chronicles of Evil; Tae In-ho – Shadow Island	**Park So-dam – The Priests**; Jeong Ha-dam – Steel Flower; Kim Sae-byuk – A Midsummer's Fantasia; Kim Si-eun – Su Saek; Kwon So-hyun – Madonna
**Most Popular Actor**	**Most Popular Actress**
**Doh Kyung-soo – Pure Love**	**Bae Suzy – The Sound of a Flower**

=== Television ===
**Grand Prize**	**Best Drama**
**Descendants of the Sun (drama)**	**Signal**; Descendants of the Sun; Reply 1988; She Was Pretty; Six Flying Dragons
**Best Entertainment Program**	**Best Educational Show**
**King of Mask Singer**; Actor School; My Little Television; Please Take Care of My Refrigerator; Same Bed, Different Dreams	**Examination**; Kim Je-dong's Talk to You; The Next Human; The Secret Readers Club; Wind for School
**Best Director**	**Best Screenplay**
**Shin Won-ho – Reply 1988**; Jung Dae-yoon – She Was Pretty; Kim Won-seok – Signal; Lee Eung-bok, Baek Sang-hoon – Descendants of the Sun; Shin Kyung-soo – Six Flying Dragons	**Kim Eun-hee – Signal**; Kim Eun-sook, Kim Won-seok – Descendants of the Sun; Kim Young-hyun, Park Sang-yeon – Six Flying Dragons; Lee Woo-jung – Reply 1988; Yang Hee-seung – Oh My Ghost
**Best Actor**	**Best Actress**
**Yoo Ah-in – Six Flying Dragons**; Cho Jin-woong – Signal; Joo Won – Yong-pal; Namkoong Min – Remember; Song Joong-ki – Descendants of the Sun	**Kim Hye-soo – Signal**; Hwang Jung-eum – She Was Pretty; Kim Hyun-joo – I Have a Lover; Ra Mi-ran – Reply 1988; Song Hye-kyo – Descendants of the Sun
**Best New Actor**	**Best New Actress**
**Ryu Jun-yeol – Reply 1988**; Ahn Jae-hong - Reply 1988; Byun Yo-han – Six Flying Dragons; Lee Dong-hwi – Reply 1988; Yook Sungjae – Who Are You: School 2015	**Kim Go-eun – Cheese in the Trap**; Lee Hyeri – Reply 1988; Lee Sung-kyung – Flower of Queen; Park So-dam – My First Time; Ryu Hye-young – Reply 1988
**Best Male Variety Performer**	**Best Female Variety Performer**
**Kim Gura – My Little Television**; Jeong Jun-ha – Infinite Challenge; Kim Sung-joo – King of Mask Singer; Kim Young-chul – Real Men; Yoon Jung-soo – With You	**Kim Sook – With You**; Hong Yoon-hwa – People Looking for a Laugh; Jang Do-yeon – Comedy Big League; Oh Na-mi – Gag Concert; Park Na-rae – Comedy Big League
**Most Popular Actor**	**Most Popular Actress**
**Song Joong-ki – Descendants of the Sun**	**Song Hye-kyo – Descendants of the Sun**

=== Special awards ===
Awards	Recipient
**InStyle Fashion Award**	Park Bo-gum, Bae Suzy
**iQIYI Global Star Award**	Song Joong-ki, Song Hye-kyo
