= Yoo Hae-jin =

South Korean actor (born 1970)

Yoo Hai-jin
- Yoo in 2026
- Born: January 4, 1970 (age 56); Cheongju, North Chungcheong Province, South Korea
- Occupation: Actor
- Years active: 1997–present
- Agent: VAST Entertainment

Korean name
- Hangul: 유해진
- Hanja: 柳海真
- RR: Yu Haejin
- MR: Yu Haejin

Yoo Hae-jin (Korean: 유해진; born January 4, 1970) is a South Korean actor. After graduating with a Theater degree from Seoul Institute of the Arts, he became a member of Theater troupe The Mokwha Repertoire Company. Yoo expanded into film in the late 1990s, initially appearing in supporting roles in films such as The King and the Clown (2005) and Tazza: The High Rollers (2006), winning the Grand Bell Award for Best Supporting Actor for the former. He subsequently became one of South Korea's most prominent supporting actors, receiving further Best Supporting Actor awards for Moss (2010) and The Pirates (2014).

Yoo later transitioned into leading roles, notably starring in the commercially successful comedy Luck Key (2016) and the action film Confidential Assignment (2017). He went on to appear in films including Intimate Strangers (2018), Mal-Mo-E: The Secret Mission and The Battle: Roar to Victory (both 2019), The Night Owl (2022), and Exhuma (2024). In 2026, his performance in The King's Warden earned him the Baeksang Arts Award Grand Prize.

== Early life and education ==
Yoo’s interest in acting began in childhood, when he would sneak into a cultural center in Cheongju to watch performances. During eighth grade, a monologic play inspired him to pursue the craft professionally. Although he hoped to attend an arts high school, he was unable to do so because of financial constraints and opposition from his conservative parents. Instead, he joined a theater troupe following a summer acting camp in high school. Despite an introverted personality, he developed his skills by assisting and observing seasoned actors.

After high school, Yoo auditioned for university acting and film programs for two consecutive years but was unsuccessful. Reports suggest these rejections were based on his physical appearance. Although he initially planned to begin his mandatory military service immediately, his father encouraged him to explore other avenues first. Yoo chose to study fashion, under the impression that it would eventually benefit his acting career. After he completed his military service, he remained focused on theater during his time in fashion school, which resulted in poor academic performance. However, his father's earlier advice proved beneficial. A special selection process for college graduates permitted admission based only on written test, leading to his enrollment at the Seoul Institute of the Arts in 1995.

== Career ==
In 1997, a pivotal moment in his life occurred in New York City. He traveled there with Professor Kang Man-hong and fellow actor Ryu Seung-ryong to visit and perform in the La MaMa Experimental Theatre Club. During this trip, he attended various influential performances, including Stomp, Blue Man Group, and Tube.

Following his graduation from the Seoul Institute of the Arts with a degree in Theater, Yoo performed with the Dongrang Repertory Theater Company and later became a member of The Mokwha Repertoire Company. During this period, a chance encounter with a bidet factory owner at a bakery led to a part-time job offer. Yoo later recalled that the owner requested he recruit an additional worker because Yoo struggled with the labor on his own. He enlisted Ryu Seung-ryong for the job. The two actors rented a room in the countryside for one month, where they worked together assembling bidets.

Yoo then began doing bit roles in films, graduating to supporting roles where he acquired a reputation as a scene stealer. Despite limited short screen time, his performances made a strong impression on audiences and critics. As Korean films became more diverse in terms of genre, Yoo found opportunities in increasingly weighty roles, over time becoming a bonafide marquee name at the box office. He has since established himself as one of the top character actors in the country, notably in King and the Clown, Small Town Rivals, Jeon Woo-chi: The Taoist Wizard, Moss, The Unjust, The Pirates, The Classified File, Minority Opinion, Veteran, and Public Enemy and its sequels.

Yoo also began to take on lead roles. His first lead came in the film, Luck Key, which was released in 2016 and exceeded 5 million viewers. 2017 was a successful year for Yoo - he had the co-lead in Confidential Assignment, and had supporting roles in A Taxi Driver and 1987: When the Day Comes. All three were among the highest grossing Korean films of that year. In addition, A Taxi Driver earned him a Best Supporting Actor award at the Korean Association of Film Critics Awards and a nomination at the Asian Film Awards. In 2018, he starred in the family comedy Love+Sling, and Intimate Strangers, a remake of the Italian comedy Perfect Strangers. That year, he also was cast in the historical war film The Battle: Roar to Victory. He reprised his role in Confidential Assignment 2: International, which was the third highest grossing Korean film in 2022.

He has also appeared as a regular cast member on two reality shows: 2 Days & 1 Night from March to November 2013, and Three Meals a Day: Fishing Village in January 2015.

In November 2023, Yoo signed with the new agency Awesome ENT.

In 2026, Yoo portrayed Eom Heung-do, the title character of the historical film The King's Warden directed by Jang Hang-jun. The film was released on February 4, 2026, coinciding with the Korean New Year holiday. It received positive reviews and did well at the box office.

== Endorsements ==
Yoo Hae-jin has become a popular choice as an advertising model for the food industry following the number of films he has had with 10 million viewers. Nongshim chose Yoo and Song Kang-ho as models for their new Shin Ramyun commercial in 2015. In the commercial, Song Kang-ho is seen boiling the noodles while singing about their enhanced flavor, and Yoo is shown enjoying the ramen while bantering with Song.

== Personal life ==
Yoo and actress Kim Hye-soo first met in 2001 after shooting the movie Kick the Moon and became close in 2006 after appearing together in Tazza: The High Rollers. Rumors of their relationship surfaced in 2008 although both continued to deny any romantic involvement until early 2010 when paparazzi photographs of the two were released, and the couple officially confirmed their relationship. Yoo and Kim broke up in 2011.

== Filmography ==
=== Film ===
Year	Title	Role	Notes	Ref.
1997	Blackjack	Dump		
1999	The Spy	Eokkae 2	Bit part	
1999	Attack the Gas Station	Yonggari	Bit part	
2001	Kick the Moon	Neopchi		
2001	Musa the Warrior	Du-chung		
2002	Public Enemy	Yong-man		
2002	Break Out	Composed man		
2002	Jail Breakers	Chu Moo-seung		
2002	The Coast Guard	Cheol-gu		
2003	Mr. Butterfly	Dong-sik	Cameo	
2003	Please Teach Me English	Subway passenger	Cameo	
2004	Ice Rain	Park In-soo		
2004	Dance with the Wind		Cameo	
2004	Hi! Dharma 2: Showdown in Seoul	Yong-dae		
2005	Another Public Enemy	Yong-man	Bit part	
2005	Blood Rain	Dok-gi		
2005	Short Time	Han-kal	Cameo	
2005	Never to Lose	Gas bucket	Cameo	
2005	Mapado	Fisherman	Cameo	
2005	King and the Clown	Yuk-gab		
2006	Over the Border	Kim Sun-ho's brother-in-law		
2006	Tazza: The High Rollers	Ko Gwang-ryeol		
2006	Once in a Summer	PD Kim	Cameo	
2007	Small Town Rivals	Noh Dae-gyu		
2007	My Son	Man next door	Voice cameo	
2007	Mission Possible: Kidnapping Granny K	Moon Geun-young		
2008	Public Enemy Returns	Yong-man		
2008	Truck	Truck driver Jung Cheol-min		
2009	Jeon Woo-chi: The Taoist Wizard	Chorangyi		
2010	A Little Pond	Refugee	Bit part	
2010	Moss	Kim Deok-cheon		
2010	Enemy at the Dead End	Park Sang-eob		
2010	The Unjust	Jang Seok-gu		
2011	In Love and War	Jae-hoon		
2011	Mama	Mama's boy gangster Seung-chul		
2012	Miss Conspirator	Red Shoes		
2012	The Spies	Department head Choi		
2012	Rise of the Guardians	Easter Bunny	Voice; Korean dub	
2013	The Flu	Bae Kyung-ub		
2014	Obsessed	Im, owner of Renaissance Music Hall		
2014	The Pirates	Chul-bong		
2014	Tazza: The Hidden Card	Ko Gwang-ryeol		
2015	The Classified File	Kim Joong-san		
2015	Minority Opinion	Jang Dae-seok		
2015	Veteran	Managing director Choi		
2015	Fatal Intuition	Pharmacist Min		
2016	Luck Key	Hyung-wook		
2017	Confidential Assignment	Kang Jin-tae		
2017	A Taxi Driver	Hwang Tae-sool		
2017	1987: When the Day Comes	Han Byung-yong		
2018	Love+Sling	Gwi-bo		
2018	Intimate Strangers	Tae-soo		
2019	Mal-Mo-E: The Secret Mission	Kim Pan-soo		
2019	The Battle: Roar to Victory	Hwang Hae-cheol		
2021	Space Sweepers	Robot Bubs	Voice and motion capture	
2021	Egoist: The Border of Selfishness and Altruism	Narrator	Documentary	
2022	Life Is But A Dream	Undertaker	Short film	
2022	Confidential Assignment 2: International	Kang Jin-tae		
2022	The Night Owl	King Injo		
2023	Honey Sweet	Chi-ho		
2024	Dog Days	Min-sang		
2024	Exhuma	Yeong-geun		
2025	Yadang: The Snitch	Koo Gwan-hee		
2025	Big Deal	Pyo Jong-rok		
2026	The King's Warden	Eom Heung-do		
2026	The Assassin(s)	Detective Cheol-gu		

=== Television ===
Year	Title	Role	Notes	Ref.
2004	Toji, the Land	Kim Pyeong-san / Kim Doo-soo		
2013	March: A Story of Friends	Himself		
2013	2 Days & 1 Night	Cast member	Season 2, episodes 56–89	
2015	Three Meals a Day: Fishing Village	Cast member		
2015	Three Meals a Day: Fishing Village 2	Cast member		
2016	Three Meals a Day: Gochang Village	Cast member		
2019	Korean Hostel in Spain	Cast member		
2020	Humanimal	Cast member	with Park Shin-hye	
2020	Three Meals a Day: Fishing Village 5	Cast member		
2022–2023	Europe Outside Your Tent	Cast member	Season 1 and 3	
2022	Doctors Without Borders	Narrator	Photo exhibition audio guide	

=== Music video appearances ===
Year	Song title	Artist	Ref.
2001	"Fix the Makeup"	Wax	
2006	"It was All You"	Sunset	

== Theater ==
List of stage play(s)
Year	Title		Role	Theater	Date	Ref.
Year	English	Korean	Role	Theater	Date	Ref.
1998	Birds Don't Cross at Crosswalks	새들은 횡단보도로 건너지 않는다	Jae-ho	Theater Arunguji	—N/a	
1999	Chunpoong's Wife	춘풍의 처	Multi-roles	Theater Arunguji	August 10 to October 3	
1999	(2nd) (1999) Oh Tae-seok Theater Festival - Our Sound, Color, and Gesture	(제2회) (1999) 오태석 연극제 - 우리 소리 · 색깔 · 몸짓	Bu, Koo Seon-bok	Theater Arunguji	—N/a	

== Accolades ==
=== Awards and nominations ===
Name of the award ceremony, year presented, category, nominee of the award, and the result of the nomination
Award ceremony	Year	Category	Nominee / Work	Result	Ref.
Asian Film Awards	2011	Best Supporting Actor	Moss	Nominated	
Asian Film Awards	2018	Best Supporting Actor	A Taxi Driver	Nominated	
Baeksang Arts Awards	2015	Best Supporting Actor – Film	The Pirates	Won	
Baeksang Arts Awards	2017	Best Actor – Film	Luck Key	Nominated	
Baeksang Arts Awards	2024	Best Supporting Actor – Film	Exhuma	Nominated	
Baeksang Arts Awards	2026	Grand Prize – Film	The King's Warden	Won	
Baeksang Arts Awards	2026	Best Actor – Film	The King's Warden	Nominated	
Blue Dragon Film Awards	2006	Best Supporting Actor	The King and the Clown	Nominated	
Blue Dragon Film Awards	2010	Best Supporting Actor	Moss	Won	
Blue Dragon Film Awards	2011	Best Supporting Actor	The Unjust	Nominated	
Blue Dragon Film Awards	2014	Best Supporting Actor	The Pirates	Nominated	
Blue Dragon Film Awards	2015	Best Supporting Actor	Veteran	Nominated	
Blue Dragon Film Awards	2017	Best Supporting Actor	A Taxi Driver	Nominated	
Blue Dragon Film Awards	2018	Best Supporting Actor	1987: When the Day Comes	Nominated	
Blue Dragon Film Awards	2023	Best Actor	Honey Sweet	Nominated	
Blue Dragon Film Awards	2024	Best Supporting Actor	Exhuma	Nominated	
Blue Dragon Film Awards	2026	Best Actor	The King's Warden	Pending	
Brand Customer Loyalty Awards (Note: Brand Customer Loyalty Awards is annual event which selects and awards the most influential brands in society and popular culture, determined through national consumer surveys. It is organized by the Korea Consumer Forum and Brand Keys, a top 10 American brand consulting organization.)	2026	Actor (Film)	Yoo Hae-jin	Won	
Buil Film Awards	2015	Best Supporting Actor	The Classified File	Nominated	
Buil Film Awards	2023	Best Actor	The Night Owl	Nominated	
Buil Film Awards	2024	Best Supporting Actor	Exhuma	Nominated	
Buil Film Awards	2026	Best Actor	The King's Warden	Won	
Busan Film Critics Awards	2015	Best Actor	Veteran	Won	
Chunsa Film Art Awards	2006	Best Supporting Actor	Tazza: The High Rollers	Nominated	
Chunsa Film Art Awards	2017	Best Actor	Luck Key	Nominated	
Chunsa Film Art Awards	2020	Best Actor	The Battle: Roar to Victory	Nominated	
Chunsa Film Art Awards	2023	Special Acting Award	Honey Sweet	Won	
Director's Cut Awards	2019	Best Actor – Film	Intimate Strangers	Nominated	
Director's Cut Awards	2023	Best Actor – Film	The Night Owl	Nominated	
Director's Cut Awards	2026	Best Actor – Film	The King's Warden	Won	
Golden Cinematography Awards	2015	Best Supporting Actor	The Pirates	Won	
Golden Cinematography Awards	2026	Best Actor	The King's Warden	Won	
Grand Bell Awards	2006	Best Supporting Actor	The King and the Clown	Won	
Grand Bell Awards	2010	Best Supporting Actor	Moss	Nominated	
Grand Bell Awards	2011	Best Supporting Actor	The Unjust	Nominated	
Grand Bell Awards	2014	Best Supporting Actor	The Pirates	Won	
Grand Bell Awards	2015	Best Supporting Actor	Veteran	Nominated	
Korean Association of Film Critics Awards	2017	Best Supporting Actor	A Taxi Driver	Won	
Korean Film Awards	2010	Best Supporting Actor	Moss	Won	
KOFRA Film Awards	2015	Best Supporting Actor	The Pirates	Won	
Max Movie Awards	2015	Best Supporting Actor	The Pirates	Nominated	
Max Movie Awards	2016	Best Supporting Actor	Veteran	Nominated	
SACF Artists of the Year Awards	2017	Artistic Impression in Motion Pictures Award	Yoo Hae-jin	Won	
Star Night - Korea Top Star Awards Ceremony	2014	Best Supporting Actor	The Pirates	Won	
University Film Festival of Korea	2017	Best Actor	Luck Key	Won	

=== State honors ===
Name of the organization, year presented, and the honor given
Organization	Year	Honor	Ref.
Taxpayers' Day	2017	Presidential Commendation	
Korean Popular Culture and Arts Awards	2026	Presidential Commendation	

=== Listicles ===
Name of publisher, year listed, name of listicle, and placement
Publisher	Year	Listicle	Placement	Ref.
Forbes Korea	2016	Power Celebrity 40	22nd	
Gallup Korea	2015	Film Actor of the Year	10th	
Gallup Korea	2016	Film Actor of the Year	5th	
Gallup Korea	2017	Film Actor of the Year	10th	
Gallup Korea	2018	Film Actor of the Year	6th	
Gallup Korea	2019	Film Actor of the Year	8th	
Gallup Korea	2022	Film Actor of the Year	9th	
Gallup Korea	2023	Film Actor of the Year	10th	
Gallup Korea	2024	Film Actor of the Year	9th	
Korean Film Council	2021	Korean Actors 200 (Note: Introduces 200 actors that best represent the present and future of Korean cinema to the people in the film industry all over the world.)	Included	
The Screen	2019	2009–2019 Top Box Office Powerhouse Actors in Korean Movies	5th	
