= Kwon So-hyun (actress) =

South Korean actress (born 1987)

- Born: January 29, 1987 (age 39); Andong, South Korea
- Education: Sangmyung University – Theatre and Film
- Occupation: Actress
- Years active: 2007–present
- Agent: Billions

Korean name
- Hangul: 권소현
- RR: Gwon Sohyeon
- MR: Kwŏn Sohyŏn

Kwon So-hyun (Korean: 권소현; born January 29, 1987) is a South Korean actress.

== Career ==
Kwon So-hyun started her acting career as a musical stage actress in Beautiful Game (2007). In 2010, she won Best New Actress at the Daegu International Musical Festival. In 2015, she landed her first leading role in Shin Su-won's third feature Madonna because she was the "fat" actress Shin had a hard time looking for. Her performance won her recognition, earning her numerous nominations, including winning Best New Actress at the 35th Korean Association of Film Critics Awards in 2015 and 3rd Wildflower Film Awards in 2016.

In 2022, Kwon signed a contract with J Flex.

== Filmography ==
=== Film ===
Year	Title	Role	Notes	Ref.
2013	Love Scene			
2015	Madonna	Jang Mi-Na		
2018	Dark Figure of Crime	Oh Ji-hee		
2018	Miss Baek	Joo Mi-Kyung		
2020	Pray	Yeon Jeong		
2020	Light for the Youth	Chief		
2021	Sinkhole	Yeong-i		
2024	Deliver	Wu-hee		
2025	Audition 109	Soo-young		

=== Television series ===
Year	Title	Role	Notes	Ref.
2018	My Healing Love	Im Joo-ah		
2019	Flower Crew: Joseon Marriage Agency	Queen Dowager Yoon		
2019–2020	Black Dog: Being A Teacher	Song Ji-sun	Cameo (Episode 1–5, 16)	
2021	Mine	Ji-won's mother	Cameo (Episode 3–4)	
2021	The Veil	Goo Hyo-eun		

=== Web series ===
Year	Title	Role	Notes	Ref.
2022	People of the Blue House	Eldest daughter	Sitcom	
2025	Spirit Fingers	Hwang Bun-hong (Pink Finger)		

== Theatre ==
Year	Title	Role
2007	Beautiful Game	Bernardet
2008	Evil Dead	
2009	Hairspray	Stacy
2011	Turandot	Paeng
2011	Cooking with Elvis	Daughter
2012–2013	Greece	Jeanne
2014	Singing Shylock	

== Awards and nominations ==
Year	Award	Category	Nominated work	Result
2010	4th Daegu International Musical Festival	Best New Actress	—N/a	Won
2015	24th Buil Film Awards	Best New Actress	Madonna	Nominated
2015	35th Korean Association of Film Critics Awards	Best New Actress	Madonna	Won
2015	36th Blue Dragon Film Awards	Best New Actress	Madonna	Nominated
2016	21st Chunsa Film Art Awards	Best New Actress	Madonna	Nominated
2016	3rd Wildflower Film Awards	Best New Actress	Madonna	Won
2016	52nd Baeksang Arts Awards	Best New Actress	Madonna	Nominated
2018	38th Korean Association of Film Critics Awards	Best Supporting Actress	Miss Baek	Won
2018	39th Blue Dragon Film Awards	Best Supporting Actress	Miss Baek	Nominated
2019	55th Baeksang Arts Awards	Best Supporting Actress	Miss Baek	Won
2021	2021 MBC Drama Awards	Best Supporting Actress	The Veil	Nominated
