= Choi Dong-hoon =

South Korean film director and screenwriter

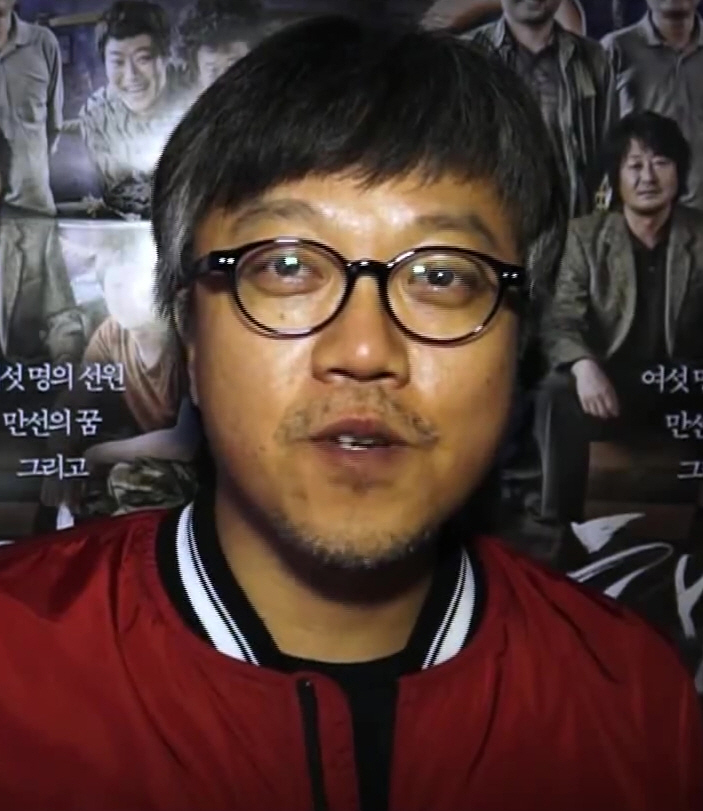
- Born: February 24, 1971 (age 55); Jeonju, North Jeolla Province, South Korea
- Education: Sogang University - B.A. in Korean Language and Literature; Korean Academy of Film Arts - Filmmaking
- Occupations: Film director, screenwriter
- Years active: 1998–present
- Spouse: Ahn Soo-hyun (film producer)

Korean name
- Hangul: 최동훈
- RR: Choe Donghun
- MR: Ch'oe Tonghun

Choi Dong-hoon (Korean: 최동훈; born February 24, 1971) is a South Korean film director and screenwriter. He ranks as one of the most consistently successful directors working in contemporary Korean cinema, with all first five of his films becoming commercial hits -- The Big Swindle attracted 2.12 million viewers, Tazza: The High Rollers at 6.84 million, Jeon Woo-chi: The Taoist Wizard at 6.13 million, The Thieves at 12.9 million, and Assassination at 12.7 million.

== Career ==
After graduating from the prestigious Korean Academy of Film Arts, Choi Dong-hoon first worked as an assistant director on Im Sang-soo's Tears (he subsequently appeared in acting cameos in several of Im's films).

After working on the screenplay for two years, Choi made his feature film directorial debut in 2004 with The Big Swindle and single-handedly re-imagined the heist and crime thriller genre into something uniquely Korean. His follow-up Tazza: The High Rollers, a gambling flick adapted from Huh Young-man and Kim Se-yeong's manhwa, was the second highest grossing Korean film of 2006, and producer/Sidus FNH CEO Cha Seung-jae praised Choi as "a genius storyteller for his spectacular ability to develop elaborate stories." 2009's Jeon Woo-chi: The Taoist Wizard was lauded as the first Korean fantasy/superhero blockbuster movie, earning Choi a reputation as an artistically innovative and commercially successful writer-director.

He returned to the heist genre in 2012 with the star-studded crime caper The Thieves, which attracted almost 13 million viewers in 70 days to become the second all-time highest grossing movie in Korean film history. Tazza and Thieves leading lady Kim Hye-soo described him as "a genius who also works extremely hard. I think he knows who he is, the exact kind of films that he wants to make, and how to make them."

Choi made his first period film with 2015's Assassination, about freedom fighters during Japan's colonial rule, and it was once again a box office hit, crossing the 10 million admissions milestone on the 70th anniversary of South Korean independence.

In 2017, Choi began production on his next film Wiretap, a remake of the 2009 Hong Kong film Overheard. However, production was halted so Kim Woo Bin could undergo treatment for cancer. At the end of 2019, the director was then reported to be working on a two-part science fiction film. The first part titled Alienoid which depicts a story unfolding as the door of time open between late Goryeo and the present day, when aliens appear, was released in July 2022.

== Filmography ==
=== As director ===
- A Short Trip (short film, director; 2000)
- The Big Swindle (director, screenwriter; 2004)
- Tazza: The High Rollers (director, screenwriter; 2006)
- Jeon Woo-chi: The Taoist Wizard (director, screenwriter; 2009)
- The Thieves (director, screenwriter; 2012)
- Assassination (director, screenwriter, producer; 2015)
- Alienoid (director, screenwriter, producer; 2022)
- Alienoid: Return to the Future (director, screenwriter, producer; 2024)
- Wiretap (director, screenwriter; TBA)

=== Other ===
- Tears (assistant director, cameo; 2000)
- A Good Lawyer's Wife (cameo; 2003)
- Boy Goes to Heaven (screenwriter; 2005)
- The President's Last Bang (cameo; 2005)
- The Restless (screenwriter; 2006)

== Awards ==
Year	Award	Category	Recipients	Result
2004	3rd Korean Film Awards	Best New Director	The Big Swindle	Won
2004	3rd Korean Film Awards	Best Screenplay	The Big Swindle	Won
2004	25th Blue Dragon Film Awards	Best New Director	The Big Swindle	Won
2004	25th Blue Dragon Film Awards	Best Screenplay	The Big Swindle	Won
2004	7th Director's Cut Awards	Best New Director	The Big Swindle	Won
2004	24th Korean Association of Film Critics Awards	Best New Director	The Big Swindle	Won
2004	41st Grand Bell Awards	Best New Director	The Big Swindle	Won
2004	41st Grand Bell Awards	Best Screenplay	The Big Swindle	Won
2005	2005 SBS Gayo Daejeon	Music Video of the Year	MV	Won
2006	14th Chunsa Film Art Awards	Best Film	Tazza: The High Rollers	Nominated
2006	14th Chunsa Film Art Awards	Best Director	Tazza: The High Rollers	Nominated
2006	27th Blue Dragon Film Awards	Best Film	Tazza: The High Rollers	Nominated
2006	27th Blue Dragon Film Awards	Best Director	Tazza: The High Rollers	Nominated
2007	43rd Baeksang Arts Awards	Grand Prize (Daesang)	Tazza: The High Rollers	Won
2007	43rd Baeksang Arts Awards	Best Film	Tazza: The High Rollers	Nominated
2007	43rd Baeksang Arts Awards	Best Director	Tazza: The High Rollers	Won
2007	8th Newport Beach Film Festival	Best Feature	Tazza: The High Rollers	Won
2007	8th Newport Beach Film Festival	Best Director	Tazza: The High Rollers	Won
2007	44th Grand Bell Awards	Best Director	Tazza: The High Rollers	Nominated
2007	8th Busan Film Critics Awards	Best Screenplay	Tazza: The High Rollers	Won
2007	6th Korean Film Awards	Best Film	Tazza: The High Rollers	Nominated
2007	6th Korean Film Awards	Best Director	Tazza: The High Rollers	Nominated
2007	6th Korean Film Awards	Best Screenplay	Tazza: The High Rollers	Won
2012	21st Buil Film Awards	Best Director	The Thieves	Nominated
2012	21st Buil Film Awards	Buil Readers' Jury Award	The Thieves	Won
2012	49th Grand Bell Awards	Best Director	The Thieves	Nominated
2012	33rd Blue Dragon Film Awards	Best Film	The Thieves	Nominated
2012	33rd Blue Dragon Film Awards	Best Director	The Thieves	Nominated
2012	33rd Blue Dragon Film Awards	Best Screenplay (Note: Lee Ki-cheol)	The Thieves	Nominated
2012	33rd Blue Dragon Film Awards	Audience Choice Award for Most Popular Film	The Thieves	Won
2012	20th Korean Culture and Entertainment Awards	Best Film	The Thieves	Won
2013	49th Baeksang Arts Awards	Best Director	The Thieves	Nominated
2015	24th Buil Film Awards	Best Film	Assassination	Nominated
2015	24th Buil Film Awards	Best Director	Assassination	Nominated
2015	35th Korean Association of Film Critics Awards	Best Film	Assassination	Nominated
2015	35th Korean Association of Film Critics Awards	Best Director	Assassination	Nominated
2015	35th Korean Association of Film Critics Awards	Top 10 Films of the Year	Assassination	Won
2015	52nd Grand Bell Awards	Best Film	Assassination	Nominated
2015	52nd Grand Bell Awards	Best Director	Assassination	Nominated
2015	52nd Grand Bell Awards	Best Screenplay	Assassination	Nominated
2015	36th Blue Dragon Film Awards	Best Film	Assassination	Won
2015	36th Blue Dragon Film Awards	Best Director	Assassination	Nominated
2015	36th Blue Dragon Film Awards	Best Screenplay	Assassination	Nominated
2016	52nd Baeksang Arts Awards	Best Film	Assassination	Won
2016	52nd Baeksang Arts Awards	Best Director	Assassination	Nominated
2016	52nd Baeksang Arts Awards	Best Screenplay	Assassination	Nominated
2015	21st Chunsa Film Art Awards	Best Director	Assassination	Won
2015	21st Chunsa Film Art Awards	Best Screenplay	Assassination	Nominated
2015	11th Max Movie Awards	Best Film	Assassination	Nominated
2015	11th Max Movie Awards	Best Director	Assassination	Nominated
2015	11th Max Movie Awards	Best Poster	Assassination	Nominated

== See also ==
- List of Korean film directors
- Cinema of Korea
