= 52nd Grand Bell Awards =

2015 edition of award ceremony

- Date: November 20, 2015
- Site: KBS Hall in Yeouido, Seoul
- Hosted by: Shin Hyun-joon; Han Go-eun

Television coverage
- Network: KBS2

The 52nd Grand Bell Awards (Korean: 대종상 영화제; RR: Daejongsang Yeonghwajae), also known as Daejong Film Awards, are determined and presented annually by The Motion Pictures Association of Korea for excellence in film in South Korea. The Grand Bell Awards were first presented in 1962 and have gained prestige as the Korean equivalent of the American Academy Awards.

== 52nd ceremony ==
The 52nd Grand Bell Awards ceremony was held at the KBS Hall in Yeouido, Seoul on November 20, 2015, and hosted by Shin Hyun-joon and Han Go-eun. To promote the festival and Korean films overseas, the ceremony was broadcast live online in China and a new category for foreign films was set up.

== Nominations and winners ==
(Winners denoted in bold)

Best Film	Best Director
**Ode to My Father**; Assassination; Northern Limit Line; The Throne; Veteran	**Yoon Je-kyoon** - **Ode to My Father**; Choi Dong-hoon - Assassination; Kim Sung-ho - How to Steal a Dog; Lee Joon-ik - The Throne; Oh Seung-uk - The Shameless; Ryoo Seung-wan - Veteran
Best Actor	Best Actress
**Hwang Jung-min** - **Ode to My Father**; Ha Jung-woo - Assassination; Son Hyun-joo - The Chronicles of Evil; Yoo Ah-in - The Throne; Yoo Ah-in - Veteran	**Jun Ji-hyun** - **Assassination**; Han Hyo-joo - The Beauty Inside; Kim Hye-soo - Coin Locker Girl; Yunjin Kim - Ode to My Father; Uhm Jung-hwa - Wonderful Nightmare
Best Supporting Actor	Best Supporting Actress
**Oh Dal-su** - **Ode to My Father**; Do Kyung-soo - Cart; Jin Goo - C'est Si Bon; Oh Dal-su - Assassination; Yoo Hae-jin - Veteran; Yoo Yeon-seok - The Royal Tailor	**Kim Hae-sook** - **The Throne**; Jang Yoon-ju - Veteran; Kim Hye-ja - How to Steal a Dog; Kim Young-ae - Cart; Ra Mi-ran - Ode to My Father
Best New Actor	Best New Actress
**Lee Min-ho** - **Gangnam Blues**; Kang Ha-neul - Twenty; Lee Hyun-woo - Northern Limit Line; Park Seo-joon - The Chronicles of Evil; Yeo Jin-goo - Shoot Me in the Heart	**Lee Yoo-young** - **Late Spring**; Hong Ah-reum - Makgeolli Girls; Jang Yoon-ju - Veteran; Kim Seolhyun - Gangnam Blues; Lee Re - How to Steal a Dog; Park So-dam - The Silenced
Best New Director	Best Screenplay
**Baik** - **The Beauty Inside**; Cho Geun-hyun - Late Spring; Han Jun-hee - Coin Locker Girl; Kim Gwang-tae - The Piper; Lee Byeong-heon - Twenty	**Park Su-jin** - **Ode to My Father**; Kim Seon-jeong, Park Jeong-ye - The Beauty Inside; Choi Dong-hoon, Lee Ki-cheol - Assassination; Kim Hak-soon - Northern Limit Line; Ryoo Seung-wan - Veteran
Best Cinematography	Best Editing
**Choi Young-hwan** - **Ode to My Father**; Choi Young-hwan - Veteran; Kim Ji-yong - The Royal Tailor; Kim Jung-won - Late Spring; Kim Woo-hyung - Assassination	**Lee Jin** - **Ode to My Father**; Choi Min-yong - Northern Limit Line; Kim Sang-bum, Kim Jae-bum - Veteran; Shin Min-kyung - Assassination; Yang Jin-mo - The Beauty Inside
Best Art Direction	Best Lighting
**Chae Kyung-sun** - **The Royal Tailor**; Kang Seung-yong - The Throne; Lee Tae-hun - The Treacherous; Ryu Seong-hui - Ode to My Father; Ryu Seong-hui - Assassination	**Kim Min-jae** - **The Silenced**; Kim Ho-seong - Ode to My Father; Kim Ho-seong - Veteran; Kim Seung-gyu - Assassination; Jo Kyu-young - The Royal Tailor
Best Costume Design	Best Music
**Jo Sang-gyeong** - **The Royal Tailor**; Jo Sang-gyeong, Son Na-ri - Assassination; Kwon Yu-jin, Im Seung-hee - Ode to My Father; Lee Jin-hee - The Treacherous; Shim Hyun-sub - The Throne	**Kim Jun-seong** - **The Tenor – Lirico Spinto**; Bang Jun-seok - The Throne; Jang Young-gyu, Dalpalan - Assassination; Lee Byung-hoon - C'est Si Bon; Lee Byung-woo - Ode to My Father
High Technology Special Award	Best Sound Recording
**Han Tae-jeong, Son Seung-hyeon, Kim Dae-jun, Kim Jeong-su, Akira Kai** - **Ode to My Father (Visual Effects)**; Jeong Do-an - Northern Limit Line (Special Effects); Jeong Do-an, Kim Tae-ui - Assassination (Special Effects); Lee Hee-eun, Hwang Hyo-kyun - Ode to My Father (Special Make-up); Park Ui-dong - The Silenced (Visual Effects)	**Lee Seung-cheol**, **Han Myung-hwan** - **Ode to My Father**; Choi Tae-young - The Royal Tailor; Gong Tae-won - The Tenor – Lirico Spinto; Kim Chang-seop - Veteran; Kim Suk-won, Park Joo-gang - Assassination
Best Planning	Popularity Award
**Ode to My Father**	**Kim Soo-hyun**; **Gong Hyo-jin**
Best Foreign Actors	Lifetime Achievement Award
**Sun Honglei**; **Gao Yuanyuan**	**Jeong Chang-hwa** (Director); **Yoon Il-bong** (Actor)
