= Assassination (2015 film) =

2015 South Korean film directed by Choi Dong-hun

- Theatrical release poster
- Hangul: 암살
- Hanja: 暗殺
- RR: Amsal
- MR: Amsal
- Directed by: Choi Dong-hoon
- Written by: Choi Dong-hoon; Lee Ki-cheol
- Produced by: Ahn Soo-hyun; Choi Dong-hoon
- Starring: Jun Ji-hyun; Lee Jung-jae; Ha Jung-woo; Oh Dal-su; Cho Jin-woong
- Cinematography: Kim Woo-hyung
- Edited by: Shin Min-kyung
- Music by: Jang Young-gyu; Dalpalan
- Production company: Caper Film
- Distributed by: Showbox
- Release date: July 22, 2015
- Running time: 140 minutes
- Country: South Korea
- Languages: Korean; Japanese; Mandarin
- Budget: US$16 million
- Box office: US$90.9 million

Assassination (Korean: 암살; RR: Amsal) is a 2015 South Korean period spy action thriller film co-written and directed by Choi Dong-hoon. The film, mainly set in 1930s Seoul and Shanghai during the Japanese occupation of Korea, depicts a group of Korean resistance fighters' plan to assassinate a highly ranked Japanese officer. The film drew over 12.7 million admissions, and is currently the twelfth-highest-grossing movie in South Korean film history. Assassination also won Best Film at the 36th Blue Dragon Film Awards and 52nd Baeksang Arts Awards.

== Plot ==
In 1911, during Japan's rule over Korea, a resistance fighter named Yem Sek-jin tries but fails to murder the governor-general along with a pro-Japanese businessman named Kang In-guk. That evening, Kang discovers that his own wife was helping Yem, and kills her. In response, the wet nurse runs off with one of Kang's twin daughters. By 1933, there are over 30 Korean independence factions operating in Korea, China, and Manchuria. Yem has become a captain in one of these factions, but his colleagues are unaware that he is secretly reporting to the Japanese, since back in 1911 he was tortured by the Japanese into submission. Yem meets with some Korean politicians in Hangzhou, including Kim Koo and Kim Won-bong, and is asked to gather three delinquent resistance members—Big Gun, Duk-sam, and Ahn Okyun—so they can enter Seoul and assassinate Kang, along with a general named Kawaguchi Mamoru. After bringing them to Shanghai, however, Yem sells this information to the Japanese. The Japanese attempt to find Ahn, but a skilled contract-killer named Hawaii Pistol decides, on the spur of the moment, to pretend that Ahn is his wife, allowing her to elude the soldiers.

Kim Koo questions Yem's loyalty, and tells two subordinates, Myung-woo and Se-gwang, to follow him around, and to kill him if he is a spy. However, when they follow him to his meeting with Hawaii Pistol, Yem manages to kill them in the ensuing gun fight. Yem meets with Hawaii Pistol and hires him to intercept and kill the three resistance members, lying to Hawaii Pistol by saying that they are Japanese spies. Yem anticipates a great reward from the Japanese. As Hawaii Pistol and his assistant Buddy travel to Seoul, they befriend Kawaguchi's son, who is a lieutenant in the Kwantung Army. In Seoul, Hawaii Pistol locates Big Gun and shoots him as he is running. With Big Gun missing, Duk-sam and Ahn proceed with the operation, hoping to ambush their targets at a gas station. To their misfortune, the car is a decoy and both Duk-sam and Korean sympathizer Kimura are killed in the attempt.

Ahn is then ambushed by Hawaii Pistol, but he recognizes and spares her, and even sympathizes with her mission, since he is himself a Korean. Ahn discovers that she is Kang's missing twin daughter. The other daughter, who happens to be engaged to Kawaguchi's son, recognizes Ahn and visits her apartment, but is killed by her father Kang, Yem and a group of soldiers. The latter are none the wiser and believe they have successfully killed Ahn. At this point, Ahn assumes her twin's identity, and a few days later, enters the wedding as the bride. Assisted by Hawaii Pistol, Buddy, and Big Gun—who survived his injuries—they carry out an attack on the wedding. Ahn kills Kawaguchi, and Hawaii Pistol kills Kang when Ahn hesitates to do so, revealing that he killed his father, a Japanese sympathizer, and did not want Ahn to live with that and become a mercenary like him. Big Gun is killed while covering their escape, taking Kawaguchi's son hostage, they are hemmed in by army reinforcements. Hawaii Pistol, realizing that she can still pose as her twin, shares a kiss with Ahn, promising to meet her again in the cafe they met in Shanghai. Ahn walks out and is rescued by the Japanese soldiers—she later absconds back to Shanghai. Hawaii Pistol and Buddy attempt to escape, but Yem kills them.

For his services to Japan, Yem is made head of the secret police. However, the Japanese are defeated in World War II and Korea is liberated. In 1949, a commission for war crimes investigates Yem—now a senior officer with the Korean police—who protests his innocence and points to his resistance service. The only witness to Yem's guilt is found murdered, so the charges are dropped. Even so, Yem is cornered on the streets by Ahn and Myung-woo, who survived his injuries earlier in the film but was rendered mute and slightly disfigured. They proceed to shoot Yem and he dies. Ahn sadly recalls her friends in the Resistance, Hawaii Pistol and Buddy before the screen fades out.

== Cast ==
- Jun Ji-hyun as Ahn Ok-yun / Mitsuko
- Lee Jung-jae as Yem Sek-jin
- Ha Jung-woo as "Hawaii Pistol"
- Oh Dal-su as "Buddy"
- Cho Jin-woong as Chu Sang-ok AKA "Big Gun"
- Lee Geung-young as Kang In-guk
- Choi Deok-moon as Hwang Duk-sam
- Kim Eui-sung as Butler of Kang family
- Park Byung-eun as Kawaguchi Shunsuke
- Jin Kyung as Ahn Seong-sim
- Heo Ji-won as Myung-woo
- Kim Hong-pa as Kim Koo
- Jung Gyu-soo as Hunchback
- Kim Kang-woo as Special investigator
- Shim Cheol-jong as Kawaguchi Mamoru
- Han Dong-gyu as Police chief
- Jeong Gi-seop as Military police leader
- Jung In-gyeom as Sasaki
- Lee Hwan as Se-gwang
- Tamura Hiroto as Kimura
- Lee Young-seok as Terauchi Masatake
- Shim Hee-seop as Public prosecutor
- Yoon Jong-gu as Anti-National Crimes Special Committee investigator
- Hong Won-gi as Judge
- Heo Jeong-do as Consulate employee
- Woo Sang-jeon as Ye Wanyong
- Cho Seung-woo as Kim Won-bong (special appearance)
- Kim Hae-sook as Cafe Anemone owner (special appearance)
- Hong Seong-deok as Dentist
- Kim Joon-woo as Sontag Hotel manager

== Production ==
According to the director of the film, the character Yem Sek-jin is based on Yeom Dong-jin, the right-wing militant and founder of the White Shirts Society.

With a budget of ₩18 billion (or US$16 million), Assassination filmed in both Shanghai and Seoul for five months. A special set of 13,500 square meters was created in Goyang, Gyeonggi Province, to recreate the Seosomun Street in Gyeongseong. The rest of the filming took place at the Shanghai set in Chedun, which is 27 times the size of the Hapcheon set in South Gyeongsang Province. (The 2007 Chinese film Lust, Caution was also shot in Chedun.)

=== Music ===
1. Antonín Dvořák's Humoresques Op. 101, No. 7 (heard during the group photo scene)
2. Antonín Dvořák's Symphony No. 9
3. Robert Schumann's Kinderszenen Op. 15 Träumerei (heard during Ahn Ok-yun posed as Mitsuko at her home)
4. Johannes Brahms's Hungarian Dances No. 17
5. Frédéric Chopin's Piano Concerto #1 in E Minor, Op.11
6. Richard Wagner's Die Meistersinger von Nürnberg Vorspiel zum III. Aufzug-Knappertsbusch
7. Jean Gabin's Leo, Lea, Elie issued from album DOM_1606 of Disques Dom (heard during the dancing scene after the three assassins arrived in Nanking)

== Reception ==
=== Box office ===
Opening on 1,260 screens on July 22, 2015, Assassination earned ₩3.59 billion (US$3.1 million (exchange rate 2016.05.04)) from 478,000 admissions. It was the best opening day for a local film in 2015 and the second-best opening day overall in Korea behind Avengers: Age of Ultron. As of August 26, 2015, it has grossed a total of US$77 million from 11.79 million admissions, making it the highest-grossing Korean film of 2015 as well as the eighth-all-time-highest-grossing film in Korean cinema history. The film earned CN¥46.959 million at the Chinese box office.

=== Critical reception ===
Assassination has received mixed to positive reviews, holding an 88% on Rotten Tomatoes, most reviews of which praise the film's entertainment value but criticize its length and complicated narrative. Village Voice's Simon Abrams found the film's highlights to be during its lighthearted scenes, and summarized Assassination as "the kind of overstuffed historical mega-production that Hollywood doesn't make anymore". Although lamenting the film's characters and running time, Screen Daily's Jason Bechervaise praised Choi Dong-hoon's direction and execution of the action sequences. The Washington City Paper praised the film as a "revelation for Korean cinema and a rediscovery of form".

The New York Times' Jeanette Catsoulis also praised the action scenes, but argued that the screenplay contained too many characters and surmised that "it's possible to follow [Assassination] without taking notes, but I wouldn't recommend it". Similarly, The Hollywood Reporter's Clarence Tsui admired the high production values of the film, but heavily disapproved of its poor characterizations and Choi's approach to the historical film genre, particularly labeling the ending as "half-baked commentary".

== Plagiarism lawsuit ==
On August 10, 2015, novelist Choi Jong-rim filed a lawsuit against director Choi Dong-hoon, production company Caper Film and distributor Showbox, alleging that various elements from Assassination, including the setting and the female protagonist, highly resemble those of his book Korean Memories, published in 2003. Choi is seeking ₩10 billion (US$8.65 million (exchange rate 2016.05.04)) in damages. Caper Film denied those claims, rebutting that the female character in Choi's novel is not a sniper, and that assassination schemes were common in the anti-Japanese movement.

Seoul Central District Court rejected Choi's request for an injunction to stop the film from being shown in theaters, ruling on August 19, 2015, that an abstract summary cannot be protected by copyright laws, the female protagonists in the novel and the film are "depicted in completely different ways" with the assassination plan not a major plot point in the novel, and that supporting characters Kim Koo and Kim Won-bong are real historical figures and hence cannot be viewed as a source of similarity between the two works.

== Awards and nominations ==
Year	Award	Category	Recipient	Result
2015	24th Buil Film Awards	Best Film	Assassination	Nominated
2015	24th Buil Film Awards	Best Director	Choi Dong-hoon	Nominated
2015	24th Buil Film Awards	Best Actor	Lee Jung-jae	Won
2015	24th Buil Film Awards	Best Actress	Jun Ji-hyun	Nominated
2015	24th Buil Film Awards	Best Supporting Actor	Cho Jin-woong	Nominated
2015	24th Buil Film Awards	Best Cinematography	Kim Woo-hyung	Nominated
2015	24th Buil Film Awards	Best Art Direction	Ryu Seong-hui	Won
2015	24th Buil Film Awards	Best Music	Jang Young-gyu, Dalpalan	Nominated
2015	35th Korean Association of Film Critics Awards	Best Film	Assassination	Nominated
2015	35th Korean Association of Film Critics Awards	Best Director	Choi Dong-hoon	Nominated
2015	35th Korean Association of Film Critics Awards	Best Actress	Jun Ji-hyun	Nominated
2015	35th Korean Association of Film Critics Awards	Best Cinematography	Kim Woo-hyung	Won
2015	35th Korean Association of Film Critics Awards	Technical Award	Ryu Seong-hui (Art Direction)	Won
2015	35th Korean Association of Film Critics Awards	Top 10 Films of the Year	Assassination	Won
2015	52nd Grand Bell Awards	Best Film	Assassination	Nominated
2015	52nd Grand Bell Awards	Best Director	Choi Dong-hoon	Nominated
2015	52nd Grand Bell Awards	Best Actor	Ha Jung-woo	Nominated
2015	52nd Grand Bell Awards	Best Actress	Jun Ji-hyun	Won
2015	52nd Grand Bell Awards	Best Supporting Actor	Oh Dal-su	Nominated
2015	52nd Grand Bell Awards	Best Screenplay	Choi Dong-hoon, Lee Ki-cheol	Nominated
2015	52nd Grand Bell Awards	Best Cinematography	Kim Woo-hyung	Nominated
2015	52nd Grand Bell Awards	Best Editing	Shin Min-kyung	Nominated
2015	52nd Grand Bell Awards	Best Art Direction	Ryu Seong-hee	Nominated
2015	52nd Grand Bell Awards	Best Lighting	Kim Seung-gyu	Nominated
2015	52nd Grand Bell Awards	Best Costume Design	Jo Sang-gyeong, Son Na-ri	Nominated
2015	52nd Grand Bell Awards	Best Music	Jang Young-gyu, Dalpalan	Nominated
2015	52nd Grand Bell Awards	High Technology Special Award	Jeong Do-an, Kim Tae-ui (Special Effects)	Nominated
2015	52nd Grand Bell Awards	Best Sound Recording	Kim Suk-won, Park Joo-gang	Nominated
2015	36th Blue Dragon Film Awards	Best Film	Assassination	Won
2015	36th Blue Dragon Film Awards	Best Director	Choi Dong-hoon	Nominated
2015	36th Blue Dragon Film Awards	Best Leading Actor	Lee Jung-jae	Nominated
2015	36th Blue Dragon Film Awards	Best Leading Actress	Jun Ji-hyun	Nominated
2015	36th Blue Dragon Film Awards	Best Supporting Actor	Cho Jin-woong	Nominated
2015	36th Blue Dragon Film Awards	Best Screenplay	Choi Dong-hoon, Lee Ki-cheol	Nominated
2015	36th Blue Dragon Film Awards	Best Cinematography	Kim Woo-hyung	Nominated
2015	36th Blue Dragon Film Awards	Best Editing	Shin Min-kyung	Nominated
2015	36th Blue Dragon Film Awards	Best Art Direction	Ryu Seong-hui	Nominated
2015	36th Blue Dragon Film Awards	Best Lighting	Kim Seung-gyu	Nominated
2015	36th Blue Dragon Film Awards	Best Music	Jang Young-gyu, Dalpalan	Nominated
2015	36th Blue Dragon Film Awards	Technical Award	Jo Sang-gyeong, Son Na-ri (Costume Design)	Won
2015	36th Blue Dragon Film Awards	Technical Award	Lee Jeon-hyeong, Lee Dong-hun (Visual Effects)	Nominated
2016	52nd Baeksang Arts Awards	Best Film	Assassination	Won
2016	52nd Baeksang Arts Awards	Best Director	Choi Dong-hoon	Nominated
2016	52nd Baeksang Arts Awards	Best Actress	Jun Ji-hyun	Nominated
2016	52nd Baeksang Arts Awards	Best Supporting Actor	Cho Jin-woong	Nominated
2016	52nd Baeksang Arts Awards	Best Screenplay	Choi Dong-hoon	Nominated
2016	10th Asian Film Awards	Best Supporting Actor	Oh Dal-su	Nominated
2016	10th Asian Film Awards	Best Cinematographer	Kim Woo-hyung	Nominated
2016	10th Asian Film Awards	Best Sound	Kim Suk-won, Park Joo-gang	Nominated
2016	21st Chunsa Film Art Awards	Best Director	Choi Dong-hoon	Won
2016	21st Chunsa Film Art Awards	Best Actress	Jun Ji-hyun	Nominated
2016	21st Chunsa Film Art Awards	Best Supporting Actor	Cho Jin-woong	Won
2016	21st Chunsa Film Art Awards	Best Screenplay	Choi Dong-hoon, Lee Ki-cheol	Nominated
2016	21st Chunsa Film Art Awards	Technical Award	Assassination	Nominated
2016	7th KOFRA Film Awards	Best Supporting Actor	Oh Dal-su	Won
2016	11th Max Movie Awards	Best Film	Assassination	Nominated
2016	11th Max Movie Awards	Best Director	Choi Dong-hoon	Nominated
2016	11th Max Movie Awards	Best Actor	Lee Jung-jae	Nominated
2016	11th Max Movie Awards	Best Actress	Jun Ji-hyun	Won
2016	11th Max Movie Awards	Best Supporting Actress	Kim Hae-sook	Nominated
2016	11th Max Movie Awards	Best Poster	Assassination	Nominated
