= 24th Buil Film Awards =

2015 edition of award ceremony

- Date: October 2, 2015
- Site: Haeundae Grand Hotel, Haeundae, Busan
- Hosted by: Kwon Hae-hyo; Jo Soo-hyang

The 24th Buil Film Awards (Korean: 부일영화상) ceremony was hosted by the Busan-based daily newspaper Busan Ilbo. It was held on October 2, 2015 at the Haeundae Grand Hotel's Grand Ballroom in Busan and was emceed by actors Kwon Hae-hyo and Cho Soo-hyang.

== Nominations and winners ==
Complete list of nominees and winners:

(Winners denoted in bold)

Best Film	Best Director
**The Shameless**; Assassination; The Classified File; Hill of Freedom; A Matter of Interpretation	**Kwak Kyung-taek** - **The Classified File**; Choi Dong-hoon - Assassination; Hong Sang-soo - Hill of Freedom; Im Kwon-taek - Revivre; Oh Seung-uk - The Shameless
Best Actor	Best Actress
**Lee Jung-jae** - **Assassination**; Ahn Sung-ki - Revivre; Kim Nam-gil - The Shameless; Kim Yoon-seok - The Classified File; Park Jung-bum - Alive	**Jeon Do-yeon** - **The Shameless**; Jun Ji-hyun - Assassination; Kim Go-eun - Coin Locker Girl; Kim Hye-soo - Coin Locker Girl; Yum Jung-ah - Cart
Best Supporting Actor	Best Supporting Actress
**Lee Geung-young** - **Minority Opinion**; Cho Jin-woong - Assassination; Lee Sung-min - The Piper; Oh Dal-su - Ode to My Father; Uhm Tae-goo - Coin Locker Girl; Yoo Hae-jin - The Classified File	**Moon Jeong-hee** - **Cart**; Chun Woo-hee - The Piper; Han Ye-ri - Haemoo; Kim Ho-jung - Revivre; Kim Hye-ja - How to Steal a Dog
Best New Actor	Best New Actress
**Byun Yo-han** - **Socialphobia**; Ahn Jae-hong - The King of Jokgu; Choi Woo-shik - Set Me Free; Kim Woo-bin - Twenty; Park Yoo-chun - Haemoo	**Lee Yoo-young** - **Late Spring**; Esom - Scarlet Innocence; Kim Sae-byuk - A Midsummer's Fantasia; Kwon So-hyun - Madonna; Park So-dam - The Silenced
Best New Director	Best Screenplay
**Hong Seok-jae** - **Socialphobia**; Han Jun-hee - Coin Locker Girl; Kim Gwang-tae - The Piper; Kim Tae-yong - Set Me Free; Oh Seung-uk - The Shameless; Woo Moon-gi - The King of Jokgu	**Kim Sung-je, Son A-ram** - **Minority Opinion**; Kim Gwang-tae - The Piper; Kim Kyung-chan - Cart; Kwak Kyung-taek - The Classified File; Park Su-jin - Ode to My Father
Best Cinematography	Best Art Direction
**Hong Kyung-pyo** - **Haemoo**; Hong Jae-sik - The Piper; Kang Guk-hyun - The Shameless; Kim Dong-young - Minority Opinion; Kim Hyung-koo - Revivre; Kim Woo-hyung - Assassination	**Ryu Seong-hui** - **Assassination**; Chae Kyung-sun - The Royal Tailor; Han Ah-reum - The Silenced; Kang So-young - The Piper; Kim Yu-jeong - The Classified File; Lee Ha-jun - Haemoo
Best Music	Buil Readers' Jury Award
**Jo Yeong-wook** - **The Shameless**; Dalpalan - The Silenced; Jang Young-gyu, Dalparan - Assassination; Lee Byung-hoon - C'est Si Bon; Lee Ji-soo - The Piper	**Ode to My Father**
Yu Hyun-mok Film Arts Award
**Im Heung-soon**, **Kim Min-kyung** - **Factory Complex**
