= Ode to My Father =

2014 South Korean drama film

- Theatrical release poster
- Hangul: 국제시장
- Hanja: 國際市場
- Lit.: Gukje Market
- RR: Gukje sijang
- MR: Kukche sijang
- Directed by: Yoon Je-kyoon
- Written by: Park Su-jin
- Produced by: Yoon Je-kyoon; Park Ji-seong
- Starring: Hwang Jung-min; Kim Yun-jin; Oh Dal-su; Jung Jin-young; Jang Young-nam; Ra Mi-ran; Kim Seul-gi
- Cinematography: Choi Young-hwan
- Edited by: Jin Lee
- Music by: Lee Byung-woo
- Distributed by: CJ Entertainment
- Release date: 17 December 2014
- Running time: 130 minutes
- Country: South Korea
- Languages: Korean; English; German; Vietnamese
- Budget: $13 million
- Box office: $103 million

Ode to My Father (Korean: 국제시장) is a 2014 South Korean drama film directed by Yoon Je-kyoon. Starring Hwang Jung-min, Yunjin Kim, and Oh Dal-su, it depicts South Korean history from the 1950s to the present day through the life of an ordinary man, as he experiences events such as the Hungnam evacuation of 1950 during the Korean War, the government's decision to dispatch nurses and miners to West Germany in the 1960s, and the Vietnam War.

It is currently the seventh highest-grossing film in the history of South Korean cinema, with 14.2 million tickets sold.

== Plot ==
During the Hungnam evacuation of 1950 in the Korean War, when thousands of refugees in North Korea were transported south by U.S. naval boats, the child Deok-soo loses his sister Mak-soon. His father stays behind to search for her, telling his son to take the boy's mother and two younger siblings to the port city of Busan, where Deok-soo's aunt runs an imported goods store and contracts with USFK at Busan Base. Before leaving the family, the father makes Deok-soo promise to serve as the head of the family in his place.

Deok-soo becomes his family's breadwinner from an early age, doing all sorts of odd jobs to support the family. In the 1960s, financial need forces him to travel to Germany with his best friend Dal-goo, where they find dangerous work as Gastarbeiter (guest workers) at German coal mines in Hamborn, North Rhine-Westphalia in Germany to pay for his brother's tuition at Seoul National University. There, Deok-soo falls in love with a fellow Korean, Yeong-ja, who is a nurse. Deok-soo survives a mining accident and leaves Germany after his visa expires. Yeong-ja returns to Korea months later and tells him she's pregnant with his child. They have a modest wedding, begin a life together and have two sons.

After a few years, Deok-soo's aunt dies and his elderly uncle needs money and decides to sell the store, something Deok-soo disagrees with. He purchases the store, giving up his dream of enrolling at Korea Maritime and Ocean University and becoming a sea captain.

Deok-soo enlists in the Korean army in the 1970s to serve in the war-torn Vietnam, partly to fulfill his sister's wish for a big wedding by earning enough money to purchase the store from his uncle. He returns to Korea with a lame leg after getting shot while helping villagers escape from the Viet Cong.

Deok-soo runs the store with his wife. In 1983, when major broadcast stations in Korea run TV programmes in which relatives separated during the Korean War are reunited, Deok-soo is contacted to be featured in one of these shows due to the hope of an elderly man from his hometown who claims to be his father.

On TV, the two realise they are not related. Deok-soo's family is distraught but soon afterwards, the same program brings Deok-soo back to TV in the hope of finding his long-lost sister Mak-soon. A Korean American woman adopted as a child by an American family during the Korean War is featured. Deok-soo realises that she is his long-lost sister after talking to her despite he could not speak English and she could not speak Korean. An emotional family reunion ensues and his sister comes to Korea. Deok-soo's mother dies soon afterwards.

In the present, an elderly Deok-soo finally decides to sell the store to the municipal government, something he had stubbornly refused to do despite the store losing money. His father promised to reunite with the family at the store, and this explains why Deok-soo bought it and held on to it for such a long time. In the final scene, Deok-soo wistfully tells his wife that his father is probably too old to still be alive and come home.

== Cast ==
- Hwang Jung-min as Yoon Deok-soo
- Yunjin Kim as Young-ja
- Oh Dal-su as Dal-goo
- Jung Jin-young as Deok-soo's father
- Jang Young-nam as Deok-soo's mother
- Ra Mi-ran as Deok-soo's paternal aunt
- Kim Seul-gi as Kkeut-soon
- Lee Hyun as Seung-gyu
- Kim Min-jae as Yoon Do-joo
- Tae In-ho as Yoon Gi-joo
- Hwang Seon-hwa as Yoon Seon-joo
- Uhm Ji-seong as young Deok-soo
- Jang Dae-woong as young Dal-goo
- Shin Rin-ah as young Mak-soon
- Lee Ye-eun as Yoon Seo-yeon
- Kim Sun-young as woman in the market
- Choi Jae-sub as Korean miner 1
- Jung Young-ki as Korean miner 2
- Yoo Jung-ho as Korean miner 3
- Maeng Se-chang as Korean miner 4
- Hong Seok-yeon as Deok-soo's uncle
- Stella Choe Kim as Mak-soon Yoon
- Matthew Douma as Mak-soon's U.S. husband
- Jeon So-mi as Mak-soon's eldest daughter
- Evelyn Douma as Mak-soon's youngest daughter
- Go Yoon as Hyun Bong-hak
- Nam Jin-bok as Chung Ju-yung
- Park Seon-woong as André Kim
- Hwang In-joon as Announcer Kim Dong-geon
- Park Young-seo as President of youth organization
- Jung Yun-ho as Nam Jin

== Production ==
Ode to My Father was primarily shot in Busan, director Yoon Je-kyoon's hometown where he also shot his previous films Miracle on 1st Street (2007) and Haeundae (2009). It was filmed from 3 September to 25 December 2013, notably at the titular Gukje Market, the biggest open-air street market in Busan that began in the 1950s as a series of stalls set up by wartime refugees seeking to earn a meager living. Overseas locations included the Czech Republic and Thailand (standing in for Germany and Vietnam, respectively). The film's popularity later boosted tourism in Busan, with tours offered of the locations featured in the film, such as Gukje Market; Jagalchi Market; Nampo-dong; and Chojang-dong.

With a ₩14 billion budget, Ode to My Father was the first Korean blockbuster that enforced a standard labor contract with the crew, which stated that they could not work for more than 12 hours a day, and were given overtime pay and a full day off once a week. The cultural, arts and entertainment fields in Korea have typically ignored labor laws and regulations, where deeply rooted tradition causes young staff members to be overworked yet rarely paid. After a long campaign by film professionals, the first Korean film to be made with a standard labor contract was Venus Talk in 2013, but Ode to My Father went further by enforcing the contract from the pre-production stage and ensuring that bonuses will be distributed equally to the entire crew. Director Yoon said production costs rose by ₩300 million because of the contract, but that people worked harder and more willingly, which ended up elevating the quality of the work.

== Release ==
The film was released in South Korea on 17 December 2014. It topped the box office, drawing 1.5 million viewers in its first five days with a gross of ₩1.5 billion. The film remained No. 1 for five consecutive weeks, despite facing competition from numerous new releases. By 13 January 2015, it recorded 10,001,709 ticket sales, making it the eleventh domestic film (and fourteenth overall) to reach 10 million admissions in the country's history.

In its eighth week of release, Ode to My Father became the second highest-grossing film of all time in the history of South Korean cinema, with 14.2 million admissions. As of 1 March 2015, the film has grossed US$96 million in South Korea.

For its North American run, the film premiered in Los Angeles on 31 December 2014 where it drew over 6,000 viewers after four days of release, mostly first-generation Korean-American immigrants in their fifties and older. Beginning 9 January 2015, it expanded to 43 US and Canadian cities such as New York City, Chicago, Washington D.C., Boston, Seattle, Toronto, and Vancouver.

It was also screened in the Panorama section of the 65th Berlin International Film Festival in February 2015, and among the audience were 20 ethnic Korean first-generation immigrants whose experiences were portrayed in the film.

== Critical reception ==
The film drew mixed reviews and raised controversy over its alleged attempt to idealize the past under the rule of authoritarian regimes. This began when President Park Geun-hye stressed the need for patriotism by citing a scene in the film in which the husband and wife suddenly halt an argument and pay a hand salute to the national flag when they hear the national anthem playing. Several film and culture critics lambasted it as a "conservative" or "right-wing" film that glorified industrialization, though liberal opposition lawmaker Moon Jae-in disagreed, saying "that was the reality of that time period." Critic Huh Ji-woong said that it "emphasizes the sacrifices of seniors while their current lackadaisical attitudes should be identified as a real problem," while critic Chin Jung-kwon said the film amounts to a "low-class tearjerker."

Despite the lukewarm reception from critics, the film continued to be popular among audiences. Critic Jeong Ji-wuk said the political debate ironically aided the film's box office, "It was able to top 10 million in attendance with the combination of various factors, such as being a story of a family and a father, curiosity caused by political debates and an aggressive marketing strategy of CJ Entertainment." Nostalgia was also believed to be the driving force behind its commercial success, with middle-aged viewers in their forties and older taking up 34.5 percent of ticket sales (despite the film's relative absence of buzz on social media). Critic Kim Hyung-seok said, "Audiences who lived around the era in which Deok-soo lived will feel like that the movie is an ode to themselves and feel nostalgic and comfort." Writing in the Korea Times, scholar and cultural critic David Tizzard acknowledged the rather nationalist portrayal of history but nevertheless suggested the movie remains relevant even a decade after its release and is capable of providing "a genuinely moving aesthetic experience that might help [young people] see the elderly people around them in a different light."

Director Yoon, however, said he intentionally excluded any political point of view in the film and "just wanted to talk about his father and his generation, who sacrificed themselves for their children" and "make a family movie that could be watched together by three generations." Calling the film his personal tribute to his father (he used his parents' real names Deok-soo and Young-ja for the lead characters), Yoon said, "My father passed away when I was in college and I didn't have a chance to say thank you. I hope the film serves as the channel for communication between the old and young generation."

== Awards and nominations ==
Year	Award	Category	Recipient	Result
2015	10th Max Movie Awards	Best Film	Ode to My Father	Nominated
2015	10th Max Movie Awards	Best Director	Yoon Je-kyoon	Nominated
2015	10th Max Movie Awards	Best Actor	Hwang Jung-min	Nominated
2015	10th Max Movie Awards	Best Supporting Actor	Oh Dal-su	Nominated
2015	10th Max Movie Awards	Best Supporting Actress	Ra Mi-ran	Nominated
2015	10th Max Movie Awards	Best New Actress	Kim Seul-gi	Won
2015	20th Chunsa Film Art Awards	Best Actor	Hwang Jung-min	Nominated
2015	20th Chunsa Film Art Awards	Best Screenplay	Park Su-jin	Won
2015	20th Chunsa Film Art Awards	Special Audience Award for Best Film	Ode to My Father	Won
2015	9th Asian Film Awards	Best Film	Ode to My Father	Nominated
2015	17th Udine Far East Film Festival	Audience Award	Ode to My Father	Won
2015	51st Baeksang Arts Awards	Best Director	Yoon Je-kyoon	Nominated
2015	10th APN Awards	Recipient	Yoon Je-kyoon	Won
2015	19th Bucheon International Fantastic Film Festival	It Star Award	Oh Dal-su	Won
2015	24th Buil Film Awards	Best Supporting Actor	Oh Dal-su	Nominated
2015	24th Buil Film Awards	Best Screenplay	Park Su-jin	Nominated
2015	24th Buil Film Awards	Buil Readers' Jury Award	Ode to My Father	Won
2015	35th Korean Association of Film Critics Awards	Top 10 Films of the Year	Ode to My Father	Won
2015	52nd Grand Bell Awards	Best Film	Ode to My Father	Won
2015	52nd Grand Bell Awards	Best Director	Yoon Je-kyoon	Won
2015	52nd Grand Bell Awards	Best Actor	Hwang Jung-min	Won
2015	52nd Grand Bell Awards	Best Actress	Yunjin Kim	Nominated
2015	52nd Grand Bell Awards	Best Supporting Actor	Oh Dal-su	Won
2015	52nd Grand Bell Awards	Best Supporting Actress	Ra Mi-ran	Nominated
2015	52nd Grand Bell Awards	Best Screenplay	Park Su-jin	Won
2015	52nd Grand Bell Awards	Best Cinematography	Choi Young-hwan	Won
2015	52nd Grand Bell Awards	Best Editing	Lee Jin	Won
2015	52nd Grand Bell Awards	High Technology Special Award	Han Tae-jeong, Son Seung-hyeon, Kim Dae-jun, Kim Jeong-su, Akira Kai (Visual Effects)	Won
2015	52nd Grand Bell Awards	High Technology Special Award	Lee Hee-eun, Hwang Hyo-kyun (Special Make-up)	Nominated
2015	52nd Grand Bell Awards	Best Sound Recording	Lee Seung-cheol, Han Myung-hwan	Won
2015	52nd Grand Bell Awards	Best Planning		Won
2015	36th Blue Dragon Film Awards	Best Film	Ode to My Father	Nominated
2015	36th Blue Dragon Film Awards	Best Director	Yoon Je-kyoon	Nominated
2015	36th Blue Dragon Film Awards	Best Supporting Actor	Oh Dal-su	Won
2015	36th Blue Dragon Film Awards	Best Supporting Actress	Ra Mi-ran	Nominated
2015	36th Blue Dragon Film Awards	Best Editing	Lee Jin	Nominated
2015	36th Blue Dragon Film Awards	Best Art Direction	Ryu Seong-hui	Won
2015	36th Blue Dragon Film Awards	Best Music	Lee Byung-woo	Nominated
2015	36th Blue Dragon Film Awards	Technical Award	Han Tae-jeong, Son Seung-hyeon, Kim Dae-jun, Kim Jeong-su, Akira Kai (Visual Effects)	Nominated
2015	36th Blue Dragon Film Awards	Audience Choice Award for Most Popular Film	Ode to My Father	Won
