= Bae Seong-woo =

South Korean actor (born 1972)

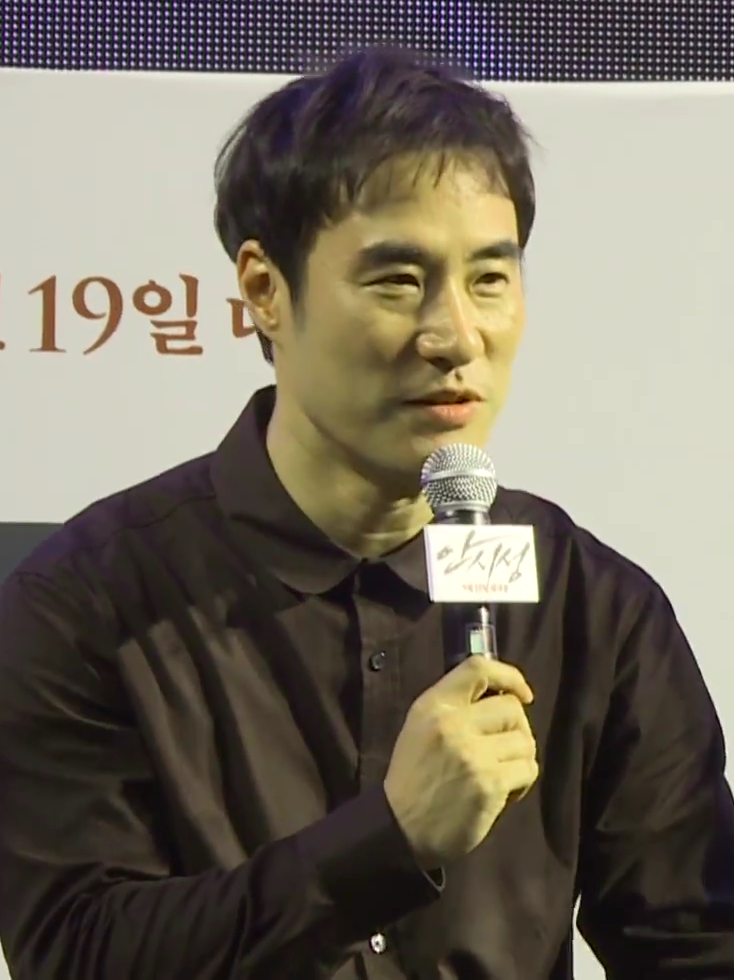
- Bae in August 2018
- Born: November 21, 1972 (age 53); Yeongdeungpo District, Seoul, South Korea
- Other name: Bae Sung-woo
- Occupation: Actor
- Years active: 1999–present
- Agent: Artist Company
- Relatives: Bae Sung-jae (brother)

Korean name
- Hangul: 배성우
- RR: Bae Seongu
- MR: Pae Sŏngu

Bae Seong-woo (Korean: 배성우; born November 21, 1972) is a South Korean actor. He has appeared in films such as Confession of Murder (2012), My Love, My Bride (2014), Office (2015), The Exclusive: Beat the Devil's Tattoo (2015) and Inside Men (2015).

== Filmography ==
=== Film ===
Year	English title	Hangul	Role	Notes
2008	Crush and Blush	미쓰 홍당무	dermatologist	
2010	Twilight Gangsters	육혈포강도단	Young-hee's son	
2011	Bedevilled	김복남 살인사건의 전말	Chul-jong	
2011	The Client	의뢰인	Prosecutor Park	
2011	Countdown	카운트다운	Dr. Ahn	
2012	Azooma	공정사회	Dr. Lee	
2012	Juvenile Offender	범죄소년	Seoul Probation Officer	
2013	How to Use Guys with Secret Tips	남자 사용설명서	CEO Jin	
2013	My Paparotti	파파로티	Sang-jin's alumnus	
2013	Mai Ratima	마이 라띠마	job broker 1	
2013	Way Back Home	집으로 가는 길	Section chief Chu Dae-yoon	
2013	Queen of the Night	밤의 여왕	Security team leader	cameo
2013	Steal My Heart	캐치미	Detective Kim	
2014	Monster	몬스터	Sung-moon	
2014	Obsessed	인간중독	Jo Hak-soo	
2014	The Divine Move	신의한수	mahjong man	
2014	Guardian	보호자		
2014	Big Match	빅매치	Axe, gang member	
2014	My Love, My Bride	나의 사랑 나의 신부	Dal-soo	
2014	My Dictator	나의 독재자	President Baek	
2014	The Royal Tailor	상의원	Je-jo	
2015	Casa Amor: Exclusive For Ladies	워킹걸	Soo-bum	
2015	The Beauty Inside	뷰티 인사이드	Woo-jin	
2015	Veteran	베테랑	used car dealer	
2015	Office	오피스	Section Chief Kim Byeong-gook	
2015	The Phone	더 폰	Do Jae-hyun	
2015	The Exclusive: Beat the Devil's Tattoo	특종: 량첸살인기	Detective Squad Chief Oh	
2015	You Call It Passion	열정 같은 소리 하고 있네	Reporter Sun-woo	
2015	Inside Men	내부자들	Park Jong-pal	
2016	Remember You	나를 잊지 말아요	Oh Kwon-ho	
2016	No Tomorrow	섬. 사라진 사람들	Sang-ho	
2016	My New Sassy Girl	엽기적인 그녀 2	Yong-sub	
2017	Because I Love You	사랑하기 때문에	An Yeo-don	
2017	The King	더 킹	Yang Dong-chul	
2017	The Swindlers	꾼	Ko Suk-dong	
2018	The Great Battle	안시성	Choo Soo-ji	
2019	Metamorphosis	변신	Park Jeong-Soo	
2020	Beasts Clawing at Straws	지푸라기라도 잡고 싶은 짐승들	Joong-man	
2023	Road to Boston	1947보스톤	Nam Seung-Ryong	
2025	Secret: Untold Melody	말할 수 없는 비밀	Kim Seung-ho	
2026	The Ultimate Duo	끝장수사	Jae-hyuk	

=== Television series ===
Year	English title	Hangul	Role	Notes	Ref.
2007	Conspiracy in the Court	한성별곡	Do-sool		
2012	Only Because It's You	너라서 좋아	Je-bi		
2013	Dating Agency: Cyrano	연애조작단: 시라노	Lee Min-shik		
2018	Live	라이브	Oh Yang-chon		
2020	Delayed Justice	날아라 개천용	Park Sam-soo	Episodes 1–16	
2024	The 8 Show	머니게임	No Sang-guk		
2024	Light Shop	조명가게	Yang Sung-sik		

=== Theater ===
Theater play performances
Year	Title		Role	Theater	Date	Ref.
Year	English	Korean	Role	Theater	Date	Ref.
2007	Closer	클로저	Un-hak			
2008	Closer	클로저	Un-hak	Seoul Arts Center Jayu Theater	March 28 to April 27.	
2010	Closer	클로저	Alice	Art One Theatre 1	August 6 to October 10	
2010	Closer	클로저	Alice	Gyeonggi Art Centre Grand Theatre	October 23 to 24	
2010	Closer	클로저	Alice	Daegu Student Culture Center Grand Hall	October 30 to 31	
2010–2011	True West	트루웨스트	Lee	Plus Theater (formerly Culture Space N.U.)	November 26, 2010 – May 1, 2011	
2011	Asian Suite	아시안 스위트	Chioko	Daehak-ro Arts Theater Small Theater	June 30, 2011 – July 14, 2011	
2011	Asian Suite	아시안 스위트	Chioko	Sogakjang Gongyu (formerly Kijageun Sonamu) Small Theater	July 23, 2011 – July 31, 2011	
2012	The Boxer	더 복서	Red Lion	Hakjeon Blue Small Theater	October 16, 2012 – December 20, 2012	
2013	Now, Voyager	이제는 애처가	Shunsuke Kimi	Sejong Center for the Performing Arts M Theater	March 20, 2013 – April 3, 2013	
2013	Autumn Firefly	가을 반딧불이	Matsumi	Daehak-ro Arts Theater Main Theater	June 14, 2013 – June 30, 2013	
2013	Closer	클로저	Larry	Art One Theatre 1	August 31, 2013 – December 1, 2013	
2014	Autumn Firefly	가을 반딧불이	Matsumi	Daehak-ro Arts Theater Main Theater	February 7, 2014 – March 2, 2014	
2014	The Boxer and the Boy	복서와 소년		Hakjeon Blue Small Theater	November 29, 2014 – December 27, 2014	
2016	True West Returns	트루웨스트 리턴즈	Lee	Yegreen Theater	June 24 to August 28, 2016	
2017	Closer	클로저	Larry	Yegreen Theater	September 6 to November 13, 2016	

== Awards and nominations ==
Year	Award	Category	Nominated work	Result
2015	36th Blue Dragon Film Awards	Best Supporting Actor	Office	Nominated
2016	52nd Baeksang Arts Awards	Best Supporting Actor	Office	Nominated
2016	KOFRA Film Awards	Discovery Award	Office	Won
2016	21st Chunsa Film Art Awards	Best Supporting Actor	Office	Nominated
2016	Max Movie Awards	Best Supporting Actor	Office	Nominated
2017	53rd Baeksang Arts Awards	Best Supporting Actor	The King	Nominated
2017	22nd Chunsa Film Art Awards	Best Supporting Actor	The King	Nominated
2017	54th Grand Bell Awards	Best Supporting Actor	The King	Won
2017	1st The Seoul Awards	Best Supporting Actor (film)	The King	Nominated
2017	38th Blue Dragon Film Awards	Best Supporting Actor	The King	Nominated
2018	6th APAN Star Awards	Best Supporting Actor	Live	Nominated
2018	2nd The Seoul Awards	Best Supporting Actor (Film)	The Swindlers	Nominated
2018	5th Korean Film Producers Association Awards	Best Supporting Actor	The Great Battle	Won
2019	55th Baeksang Arts Awards	Best Supporting Actor (Television)	Live	Nominated
