= Madonna (2015 film) =

- Theatrical poster
- Directed by: Shin Su-won
- Written by: Shin Su-won
- Produced by: Francis Lim
- Starring: Seo Young-hee; Kwon So-hyun
- Cinematography: Yun Ji-woon
- Edited by: Lee Do-hyun
- Music by: Ryu Jae-ah
- Production company: June Film
- Distributed by: Little Big Pictures
- Release dates: May 20, 2015 (Cannes); July 2, 2015 (South Korea)
- Running time: 121 minutes
- Country: South Korea
- Language: Korean
- Budget: US$350,000

Madonna (Korean: 마돈나) is a 2015 South Korean mystery-drama film written and directed by Shin Su-won. It was screened in the Un Certain Regard section of the 2015 Cannes Film Festival. Kwon So-hyun won Best New Actress at the 35th Korean Association of Film Critics Awards.

== Plot ==
Due to her mounting bills, Moon Hye-rim becomes a nurse's aide and is assigned to the VIP ward to take care of a patient who has been left paralyzed by a stroke, Kim Cheol-oh. Cheol-oh is a billionaire tycoon and the hospital's major investor, and for ten years his unscrupulous son Sang-woo has done everything in his power to extend his father's life through a series of organ transplants because Cheol-oh had instructed in his will that his entire fortune is to be given to charities (thereby putting an end to Sang-woo's affluent lifestyle). One day, a brain-dead, pregnant young woman named Jang Mi-na is brought to the hospital after a mysterious car crash. In exchange for a sum of money, Hye-rim agrees to Sang-woo's instructions that she track down Mi-na's next-of-kin and get them to sign an organ donation consent form for her heart. As Hye-rim delves into Mi-na's past and discovers that Mi-na was bullied since childhood for her hair color, weight and poverty, to her adulthood as a sexually abused factory worker who becomes a prostitute named "Madonna," the more Hye-rim forms a strange bond with her comatose patient and becomes determined to derail the heart transplant.

== Cast ==
- Seo Young-hee as Moon Hye-rim
- Kwon So-hyun as Jang Mi-na
- Kim Young-min as Kim Sang-woo
- Ko Seo-hee as Go Hyeon-joo
- Yoo Soon-chul as Kim Cheol-oh, the Chairman
- Ye Soo-jung as Foul-mouthed old woman
- Shin Woon-sub as Dr. Han
- Byun Yo-han as Dr. Im Hyeok-gyu
- Lee Myung-haeng as Sales team manager Park
- Kim Jo-jung as Pimp
- Han Song-hee as Mi-young
- Lee Sang-hee as Ah-ram
- Park Hyun-young as Joon-hee
- Jin Yong-wook as Jong-dae
- Kim Hyun-sook as Mi-na's grandmother
- Susanna Noh as Teacher Choi
- Kim Jeong-yeon as young Mi-na
- Park Ji-young as younger Choi
- Choi Hee-jin as Coffee shop owner

== Awards and nominations ==
Year	Award	Category	Recipient	Result
2015	24th Buil Film Awards	Best New Actress	Kwon So-hyun	Nominated
2015	35th Korean Association of Film Critics Awards	Best New Actress	Kwon So-hyun	Won
2015	36th Blue Dragon Film Awards	Best New Actress	Kwon So-hyun	Nominated
2016	52nd Paeksang Arts Awards	Best New Actress	Kwon So-hyun	Nominated
2016	3rd Wildflower Film Awards	Best Director (Narrative Films)	Shin Su-won	Won
2016	3rd Wildflower Film Awards	Best New Actor/Actress	Kwon So-hyun	Won
