= The Silenced =

- Theatrical release poster
- Hangul: 경성학교: 사라진 소녀들
- Lit.: Gyeongseong School: The Lost Girls
- RR: Gyeongseonghakgyo: sarajin sonyeodeul
- MR: Kyŏngsŏnghakkyo: sarajin sonyŏdŭl
- Directed by: Lee Hae-young
- Written by: Lee Hae-young
- Produced by: Kim Jho Gwangsoo; Shim Hyun-woo
- Starring: Park Bo-young; Uhm Ji-won; Park So-dam
- Cinematography: Kim Il-yeon
- Edited by: Kim Chang-ju
- Music by: Dalpalan
- Production companies: The Secret Garden; Generation Blue Films
- Distributed by: Lotte Entertainment
- Release date: June 18, 2015
- Running time: 99 minutes
- Country: South Korea
- Languages: Korean; Japanese
- Box office: US$2.5 million

The Silenced (Korean: 경성학교: 사라진 소녀들) is a 2015 South Korean mystery-thriller film written and directed by Lee Hae-young, starring Park Bo-young, Uhm Ji-won and Park So-dam.

== Plot ==
Set in Keijō (Seoul) in 1938 during the Japanese occupation, the film centers on Ju-ran/ Shizuko (Park Bo-young), a sickly young girl who is transferred to a sanatorium/girls' boarding school to recover her health. Her physical condition improves thanks to her new friend Yeon-deok, and the headmistress' special treatment program. But she soon notices that students are disappearing one by one and that her own body is undergoing abnormal changes. Determined to uncover the truth, Ju-ran starts to investigate the mysterious happenings and the school's possible role in them.

Ju-ran begins seeing a couple of her classmates in terrible positions; bleeding out or having severe seizures. The school denies that anything unusual is happening in an effort to convince Ju-ran that it is all in her head. After being confronted by her classmate Yuka, Ju-ran snaps and in a violent rage almost strangles Yuka to death with a single hand, showing incredible strength. Ju-ran does not understand what is happening to her or to the other girls in the school. With the help of Yeon-deok, who now recalls other horrors from her time there, the two investigate by breaking into the headmistress' office. While they are there, they overhear an argument between the headmistress and a young man dressed in a Japanese military uniform. The argument is about a new drug and apparently losing test subjects, referring to the disappearing classmates. When the headmistress and the soldier leave the office, Ju-ran and Yeon-deok continue their snooping, eventually finding an experiment proposal written in Japanese. It describes a performance-enhancing drug that aims to alter the human condition, making the subjects super strong but also heightening their emotions and causing many adverse side-effects. This reveals that Imperial Japan is using the girls as lab rats to create drugs to enhance performance of Japanese troops against the Allies. Ju-ran and Yeon-deok also find movies of themselves and a previous cohort that demonstrate the effects of the drug. The two students then hear a commotion outside, culminating in the attempted suicide of Yuka. In the ensuing chaos they try to escape the school by running into the forest, only to find that they are at the edge of a massive Japanese military base. Ju-ran and Yeon-deok are then captured by Japanese commander and brought back to the facility.

The Japanese commander states to the principal that he will take over the experimentation from now, much to her dismay and that of the doctor, who is Japanese herself. The soldiers ransack her office and confiscate all her documents on the experiment. Ju-ran and a number of other girls have been tranquilized and given a new form of the drug which the doctor warns may have even more violent side effects. Yeon-deok discovers an adjacent room filled with tanks containing the preserved bodies of the disappeared girls. She is discovered, knocked unconscious, chained in a tank and drowned. Her screams wake Ju-ran, but too late. Ju-ran then goes on a rampage and kills all the Japanese soldiers at the facility. She wakes the other girls and tells them about everything; together they ambush and brutally kill the doctor. The principal shoots several of them, including Ju-ran, at one point hitting the water tank with Yeon-deok in it. Ju-ran, bleeding badly and distraught at her friend's demise, throws the principal at a spike hanging on the wall, killing her. Ju-ran is last seen sitting by the body of Yeon-deok. Whispering "Let's go home now, you and I," she dies.

== Cast ==
- Park Bo-young as Cha Ju-ran / Shizuko
- Uhm Ji-won as Headmistress Kato Sanae
- Park So-dam as Hong Yeon-deok / Kazue
- Kong Ye-ji as Yuka
- Joo Bo-bi as Kihira
- Shim Hee-seop as Kenji
- Park Sung-yeon as Life teacher
- Ko Won-hee as now-deceased student also called Shizuko, seen in flashbacks

== Box office ==
The Silenced was released on June 18, 2015. It opened at third place, grossing ₩2.02 billion (US$1.83 million) from 258,000 admissions in its first four days.

== Awards and nominations ==
Year	Award	Category	Recipient	Result
2015	24th Buil Film Awards	Best New Actress	Park So-dam	Nominated
2015	24th Buil Film Awards	Best Art Direction	Han Ah-reum	Nominated
2015	24th Buil Film Awards	Best Music	Dalpalan	Nominated
2015	15th Korea World Youth Film Festival	Favorite Actress	Park Bo-young	Won
2015	52nd Grand Bell Awards	Best New Actress	Park So-dam	Nominated
2015	52nd Grand Bell Awards	Best Lighting	Kim Min-jae	Won
2015	52nd Grand Bell Awards	High Technology Special Award	Park Ui-dong (Visual Effects)	Nominated
2015	52nd Grand Bell Awards	Popularity Award	Park Bo-young	Nominated
2015	36th Blue Dragon Film Awards	Best New Actress	Park So-dam	Nominated
2015	36th Blue Dragon Film Awards	Popularity Star Award	Park Bo-young	Won
2015	16th Busan Film Critics Awards	Best New Actress	Park So-dam	Won
2016	21st Chunsa Film Art Awards	Technical Award	The Silenced	Nominated
2016	21st Chunsa Film Art Awards	Best Supporting Actress	Uhm Ji-won	Won
2016	52nd Baeksang Arts Awards	Best Supporting Actress	Uhm Ji-won	Nominated
