= The Classified File =

- Theatrical poster
- Directed by: Kwak Kyung-taek
- Written by: Han Dae-deok; Kwak Kyung-taek
- Story by: Gong Gil-yong
- Produced by: Yoo Joo-young; Park Young-jin
- Starring: Kim Yoon-seok; Yoo Hae-jin
- Cinematography: Ki Se-hoon
- Edited by: Kim Chang-ju
- Music by: Kim Hyeong-seok
- Production company: JCon Company
- Distributed by: Showbox
- Release date: June 18, 2015
- Running time: 108 minutes
- Country: South Korea
- Language: Korean
- Budget: US$8 million
- Box office: US$20 million

The Classified File (Korean: 극비수사; RR: Geukbisusa; lit. A Secret Investigation) is a 2015 South Korean crime drama film directed by Kwak Kyung-taek based on a real-life 33-day kidnapping case in Busan in 1978. It stars Kim Yoon-seok and Yoo Hae-jin in the lead roles.

== Plot ==
A young girl named Eun-joo has gone missing in Busan in 1978. Without any contact from the kidnapper in the past two weeks and no further leads or clues, the police assume that she's dead. Eun-joo's desperate mother turns to renowned fortune-teller Kim Joong-san, who tells her that her daughter is still alive and that she can be saved if they enlist the help of veteran detective Gong Gil-yong. Despite his skepticism, Gil-yong accepts the case. When one of Joong-san's premonitions about the investigation comes true, Gil-yong begins to believe in his psychic abilities, and the two men team up in an unlikely partnership to find Eun-joo and bring her home.

== Cast ==
- Kim Yoon-seok as Gong Gil-yong
- Yoo Hae-jin as Kim Joong-san
- Song Young-chang as Eun-joo's father
- Lee Jung-eun as Eun-joo's mother
- Jang Young-nam as Eun-joo's aunt
- Jang Myeong-gap as Chief Inspector Yoo, head of Busan investigation team
- Jung Ho-bin as Seo Jeong-hak
- Jin Sun-mi as Joong-san's wife
- Nam Moon-chul as Chief of police office
- Lee Jun-hyeok as Mae Seok-hwan
- Yoon Jin-ha as Driver Cheon
- Kim Kwak-kyung-hee as Aunt Park
- Lee Jae-yong as Fortuneteller Baek
- Park Hyo-joo as Gil-yong's wife

== Box office ==
The Classified File was released on June 18, 2015. It opened at second place in the box office, grossing ₩9.46 billion (US$8.58 million) from 1.17 million admissions in its first four days. By the end of its run, it had grossed ₩22,389,535,897 (US$19,284,778) from 2,860,786 admissions.

== Awards and nominations ==
Year	Award	Category	Recipient	Result
2015	24th Buil Film Awards	Best Film	The Classified File	Nominated
2015	24th Buil Film Awards	Best Director	Kwak Kyung-taek	Won
2015	24th Buil Film Awards	Best Actor	Kim Yoon-seok	Nominated
2015	24th Buil Film Awards	Best Supporting Actor	Yoo Hae-jin	Nominated
2015	24th Buil Film Awards	Best Screenplay	Kwak Kyung-taek	Nominated
2015	24th Buil Film Awards	Best Art Direction	Kim Yu-jeong	Nominated
2015	36th Blue Dragon Film Awards	Best Film	Classified File	Nominated
2015	36th Blue Dragon Film Awards	Best Director	Kwak Kyung-taek	Nominated
2015	36th Blue Dragon Film Awards	Best Supporting Actress	Jang Young-nam	Nominated
2016	52nd Baeksang Arts Awards	Best Supporting Actress	Jang Young-nam	Nominated
2016	52nd Baeksang Arts Awards	Best Screenplay (Film)	Kwak Kyung-taek	Nominated
2016	52nd Baeksang Arts Awards	Best Screenplay (Film)	Han Dae-deok	Nominated
