= The Shameless =

- Theatrical release poster
- Directed by: Oh Seung-uk
- Written by: Oh Seung-uk
- Produced by: Han Jae-duk
- Starring: Jeon Do-yeon; Kim Nam-gil
- Cinematography: Kang Guk-hyun
- Edited by: Kim Sang-bum; Kim Jae-bum
- Music by: Jo Yeong-wook
- Production company: Sanai Pictures
- Distributed by: CGV Arthouse
- Release dates: May 15, 2015 (Cannes); May 27, 2015 (South Korea)
- Running time: 118 minutes
- Country: South Korea
- Language: Korean
- Budget: US$2.5 million
- Box office: US$2.9 million

The Shameless (Korean: 무뢰한; RR: Muroehan; lit. 'A Thug') is a 2015 South Korean neo-noir crime drama film starring Jeon Do-yeon and Kim Nam-gil. It is written and directed by Oh Seung-uk, who described it as a "hardboiled romantic noir thriller".

The Shameless made its world premiere in the Un Certain Regard section of the 2015 Cannes Film Festival.

== Plot ==
The police are staking out Park Joon-gil for the murder of Hwang Choong-nam, and jaded detective Jung Jae-gon is being pressured to close the case, particularly by his former superior Moon Ki-beom, who lost his badge for corruption. Joon-gil was once the mob enforcer for Jay Investment, but had fallen out of favor when he embezzled and stole the heart of Kim Hye-kyung, the girlfriend of the company's vice president Park Jong-ho. Jay Investment representative Min Young-ki approaches Jae-gon and offers him US$5,000 to ensure that Joon-gil is maimed during the arrest as payback. Jae-gon reluctantly agrees, but a botched arrest sends Joon-gil on the run, and Jae-gon decides the best way to find him again is by sticking with Hye-kyung, hoping she will lead him to the fugitive. Hye-kyung now works as a bar hostess to pay off her substantial debt to Jong-ho, and Jae-gon threatens his way into an undercover job as a floor manager at the nightclub she works at. Introducing himself as Joon-gil's former cellmate Lee Young-joon, Jae-gon begins to spend time with the suspicious Hye-kyung and gradually wins her trust. But when Joon-gil returns asking Hye-kyung for money for a potential deal, Jae-gon's newfound feelings of love and jealousy rise to the surface.

== Cast ==
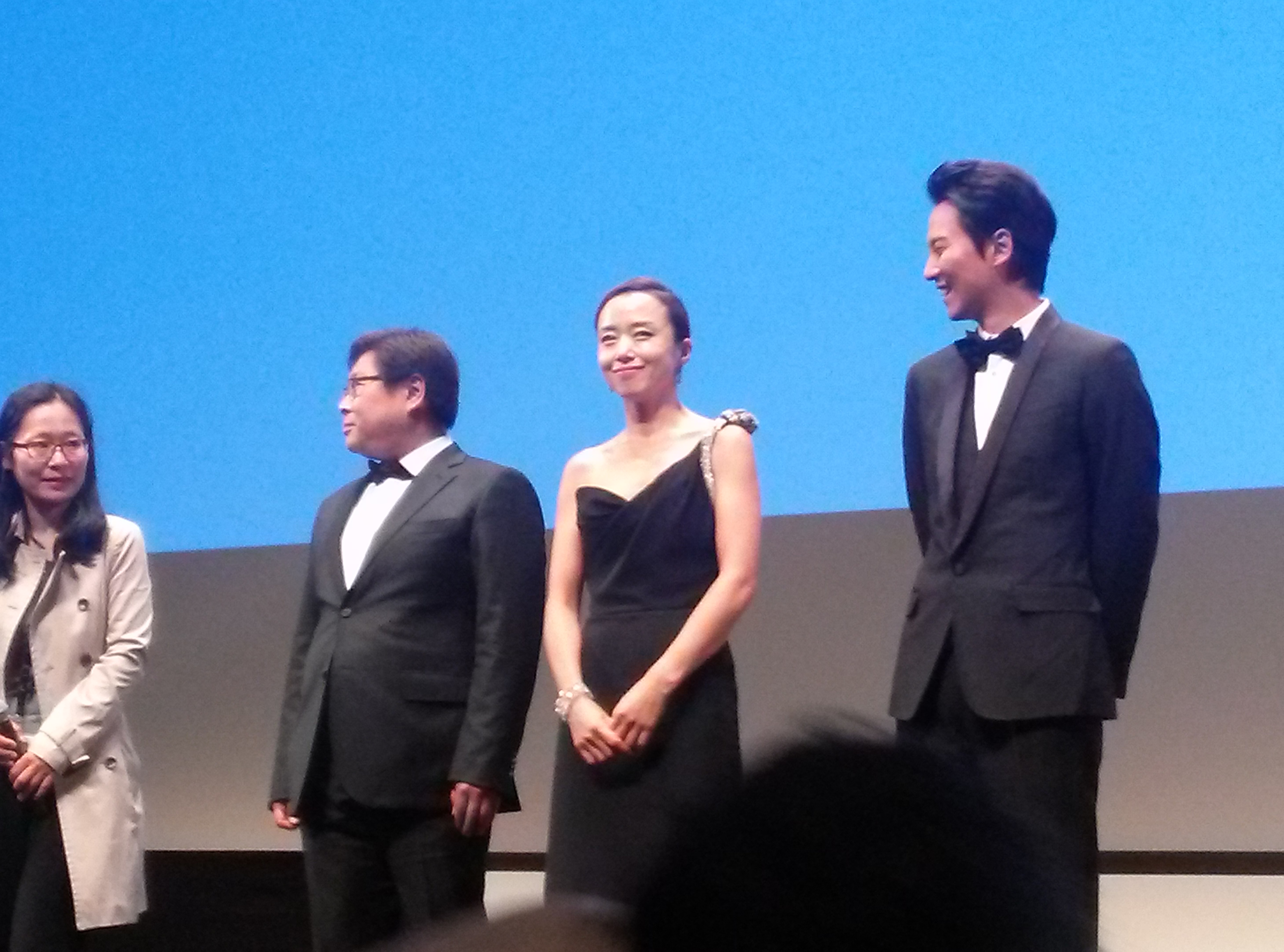
Un Certain Regard section during the Cannes Film Festival in May, 2015

- Jeon Do-yeon as Kim Hye-kyung
- Kim Nam-gil as Jung Jae-gon
- Park Sung-woong as Park Joon-gil
- Kwak Do-won as Moon Ki-beom
- Kim Min-jae as Min Young-ki
- Oh Ha-nee as Son Min-ji
- Park Ji-hwan as Son Kyung-soo
- Choi Young-do as Kim Ho-gil
- Ha Ji-eun as Han Ji-yeon
- Kang Tae-young as Kim Jin-hyung
- Ji Seung-hyun as Kim Dong-soo
- Chu Gwi-jeong as Strange woman
- Sung Seung-hyun as Drug addict
- Shin Sam-bong as Shopkeeper
- Ji Goon-woo as Drug dealer
- Lee Dong-jin as Hwang Choong-nam
- Yoo Ji-yeon as Hwang's lover
- Jung Jae-woong as Kim Hyung-seok
- Yoon Seung-won as Park Jong-ho
- Jo Won-hee as Deok-ryong

== Production ==
This was the second film Oh Seung-uk had directed, 15 years after his directorial debut Kiliminjaro (2000). Oh was a prominent screenwriter in the 1990s, having written Green Fish (1997) and Christmas in August (1998).

Lee Jung-jae was originally cast in the leading role as Jung Jae-gon, but dropped out after he was injured on the set of his 2014 film Big Match. He was replaced by Kim Nam-gil.

The Shameless began filming in June 2014.

== Box office ==
The Shameless was released on May 27, 2015. It opened at fourth place in the box office, grossing ₩2.14 billion (US$1.92 million) from 272,000 admissions in its first five days. By the end of its run, it had grossed ₩3,255,796,431 (US$2,805,292) from 413,836 admissions.

== Awards and nominations ==
| Year | Award | Category | Recipient | Result |
|---|---|---|---|---|
| 2015 | 68th Cannes Film Festival | Un Certain Regard | Oh Seung-uk | Nominated |
| 2015 | 24th Buil Film Awards | Best Film | The Shameless | Won |
| 2015 | 24th Buil Film Awards | Best Director | Oh Seung-wook | Nominated |
| 2015 | 24th Buil Film Awards | Best Actor | Kim Nam-gil | Nominated |
| 2015 | 24th Buil Film Awards | Best Actress | Jeon Do-yeon | Won |
| 2015 | 24th Buil Film Awards | Best New Director | Oh Seung-wook | Nominated |
| 2015 | 24th Buil Film Awards | Best Cinematography | Kang Guk-hyun | Nominated |
| 2015 | 24th Buil Film Awards | Best Music | Jo Yeong-wook | Won |
| 2015 | 52nd Grand Bell Awards | Best Director | Oh Seung-wook | Nominated |
| 2015 | 35th Korean Association of Film Critics Awards | Best Actress | Jeon Do-yeon | Nominated |
| 2015 | 15th Director's Cut Awards | Best Actress | Jeon Do-yeon | Won |
| 2015 | Cine 21 Awards | Best Actress | Jeon Do-yeon | Won |
| 2015 | 36th Blue Dragon Film Awards | Best Actress | Jeon Do-yeon | Nominated |
| 2015 | 36th Blue Dragon Film Awards | Best Cinematography | Kang Guk-hyun | Nominated |
| 2015 | 36th Blue Dragon Film Awards | Best Lighting | Bae Il-hyeok | Nominated |
| 2016 | 52nd Baeksang Arts Awards | Best Director (Film) | Oh Seung-wook | Nominated |
| 2016 | 52nd Baeksang Arts Awards | Best Actress | Jeon Do-yeon | Won |
| 2016 | Jecheon International Music & Film Festival | Best Actress | Jeon Do-yeon | Won |
| 2016 | 7th KOFRA Film Awards | Best Actress | Jeon Do-yeon | Won |
| 2016 | 21st Chunsa Film Art Awards | Best Actress | Jeon Do-yeon | Nominated |
