= 36th Blue Dragon Film Awards =

2015 edition of award ceremony

- Date: November 26, 2015
- Site: Kyung Hee University's Peace Palace Hall, Seoul
- Hosted by: Kim Hye-soo; Yoo Jun-sang

Television coverage
- Network: SBS

The 36th Blue Dragon Film Awards ceremony was held on November 26, 2015 at Kyung Hee University's Peace Palace Hall in Seoul. It was broadcast on SBS and hosted by Kim Hye-soo and Yoo Jun-sang.

== Nominations and winners ==
Complete list of nominees and winners

(Winners denoted in bold)

Best Film	Best Director
**Assassination**; The Classified File; Ode to My Father; The Throne; Veteran	**Ryoo Seung-wan** - **Veteran**; Choi Dong-hoon - Assassination; Kwak Kyung-taek - The Classified File; Lee Joon-ik - The Throne; Yoon Je-kyoon - Ode to My Father
Best Actor	Best Actress
**Yoo Ah-in** - **The Throne**; Hwang Jung-min - Veteran; Jung Jae-young - Right Now, Wrong Then; Lee Jung-jae - Assassination; Song Kang-ho - The Throne	**Lee Jung-hyun** - **Alice in Earnestland**; Han Hyo-joo - The Beauty Inside; Jeon Do-yeon - The Shameless; Jun Ji-hyun - Assassination; Kim Hye-soo - Coin Locker Girl
Best Supporting Actor	Best Supporting Actress
**Oh Dal-su** - **Ode to My Father**; Bae Sung-woo - Office; Cho Jin-woong - Assassination; Lee Geung-young - Minority Opinion; Yoo Hae-jin - Veteran	**Jeon Hye-jin** - **The Throne**; Jang Young-nam - The Classified File; Jin Kyung - Veteran; Moon Jeong-hee - Cart; Ra Mi-ran - Ode to My Father
Best New Actor	Best New Actress
**Choi Woo-shik** - **Set Me Free**; Byun Yo-han - Socialphobia; Kang Ha-neul - Twenty; Lee Min-ho - Gangnam Blues; Park Seo-joon - The Chronicles of Evil	**Lee Yoo-young - The Treacherous**; Kim Seolhyun - Gangnam Blues; Kwon So-hyun - Madonna; Lee Yu-bi - Twenty; Park So-dam - The Silenced
Best New Director	Best Screenplay
**Kim Tae-yong** - **Set Me Free**; Han Jun-hee - Coin Locker Girl; Hong Seok-jae - Socialphobia; Kim Sung-je - Minority Opinion; Lee Byeong-heon - Twenty	**Kim Sung-je, Son A-ram** - **Minority Opinion**; Cho Chul-hyun, Oh Seung-hyeon, Lee Song-won - The Throne; Choi Dong-hoon, Lee Ki-cheol - Assassination; Kim Kyung-chan - Cart; Ryoo Seung-wan - Veteran
Best Cinematography-Lighting	Best Editing
**Kim Tae-gyeong & Hong Seung-cheol** - **The Throne**; Choi Young-hwan & Kim Ho-seong - Veteran; Kang Guk-hyun & Bae Il-hyeok- The Shameless; Kim Tae-gyeong & Hong Seung-cheol - The Beauty Inside; Kim Woo-hyung & Kim Seung-gyu - Assassination	**Yang Jin-mo** - **The Beauty Inside**; Kim Sang-bum, Kim Jae-bum - The Throne; Kim Sang-bum, Kim Jae-bum - Veteran; Lee Jin - Ode to My Father; Shin Min-kyung - Assassination
Best Art Direction	Best Music
**Ryu Seong-hui** - **Ode to My Father**; Kang Seung-yong - The Throne; Lee Mok-won - Coin Locker Girl; Lee Tae-hun - The Treacherous; Ryu Seong-hui - Assassination	**Bang Jun-seok** - **The Throne**; Bang Jun-seok - Veteran; Jang Young-gyu, Dalpalan - Assassination; Jo Yeong-wook - The Beauty Inside; Lee Byung-woo - Ode to My Father
Technical Award	Popular Star Award
**Jo Sang-gyeong, Son Na-ri** - **Assassination (Costume Design)**; Han Tae-jeong, Son Seung-hyeon, Kim Dae-jun, Kim Jeong-su, Akira Kai - Ode to My Father (Visual Effects); Jung Doo-hong, Jung Yoon-heon - Veteran (Martial Arts); Lee Jeon-hyeong, Lee Dong-hun - Assassination (Visual Effects); Shin Jae-myeong - Gangnam Blues (Martial Arts)	**Kim Seolhyun** - **Gangnam Blues**; **Lee Min-ho** - **Gangnam Blues**; **Park Bo-young** - **The Silenced**; **Park Seo-joon** - **The Chronicles of Evil**
Best Short Film	Audience Choice Award for Most Popular Film
**The Photographers**	**Ode to My Father**
