= Office (2015 South Korean film) =

- Theatrical release poster
- Hangul: 오피스
- RR: Opiseu
- MR: Op'isŭ
- Directed by: Hong Won-chan
- Written by: Choi Yun-jin
- Produced by: Choi Yun-jin
- Starring: Go Ah-sung; Park Sung-woong; Bae Seong-woo
- Cinematography: Park Yong-su
- Edited by: Kim Sun-min
- Music by: Kim Tae-seong
- Production company: Film Blossom
- Distributed by: Little Big Pictures
- Release dates: May 18, 2015 (Cannes); September 3, 2015 (South Korea)
- Running time: 111 minutes
- Country: South Korea
- Language: Korean
- Box office: US$3 million

Office (Korean: 오피스) is 2015 South Korean thriller film directed by Hong Won-chan and written by Choi Yun-jin and starring Go Ah-sung, Park Sung-woong, and Bae Seong-woo. It is about a detective trying to figure out why a mild-mannered man has killed his family and is targeting his co-workers. The film premiered at the Midnight Screenings section of the 2015 Cannes Film Festival.

== Plot ==
Employee Kim Byeong-guk returns home one day after work and kills his family with a hammer. The police immediately begin their investigation and search for the perpetrator. Policeman Choi Jong-hun first questions his colleagues and superiors, who all seem very surprised. Among those questioned is also intern Lee Mi-rye, who later tells the policeman that Mr. Kim was the only one who had ever been nice to her. Meanwhile, Choi's colleague finds out that Kim went back to the office after the crime, but the camera did not capture him leaving, leading them to suspect that he could still be in the building. Shortly thereafter, Kim kills his former colleague Jeong Jae-il. The employees the next day are convinced that Kim is the perpetrator and are frightened. Furthermore, the company blocks the police's work so that the company is not associated with the murders, as reputation is everything.

The plot increasingly focuses on Mi-rye, who has a poor relationship with her colleagues and feels overlooked when a new intern is hired. Mi-rye works very hard, but her social skills are not well-developed, so her colleagues want to suggest the new intern for the permanent position. In the end, only Mi-rye, Ha-yeong, and Won-seok are left in the office. At about the same time, the police find Mr. Kim's body. Mi-rye throws Ha-yeong out the window and then engages in a fight with Won-seok. When they both fall in the fight, the knife pierces Mi-rye's stomach. Shortly thereafter, the police storm the office while Won-seok ignores them and continues to choke Mi-rye, so a policeman shoots him and Mi-rye recovers in the hospital.

The film leaves it unclear whether Mi-rye or Kim Byeong-guk kills the other employees. However, the viewer learns during the course of the film that Mi-rye's neighbor saw her in a trance-like state and considers her a ticking time bomb. The kitchen knife was given to Mi-rye by Mr. Kim.

== Cast ==
- Go Ah-sung as Lee Mi-rae
- Park Sung-woong as Jong-hoon
- Bae Seong-woo as Kim Byeong-gook
- Kim Eui-sung as Kim Sang-gyu
- Ryu Hyun-kyung as Hong Ji-sun
- Lee Chae-eun as Yeom Ha-young
- Son Soo-hyun as Shin Da-mi
- Park Jung-min as Lee Won-suk
- Oh Dae-hwan as Jung Jae-il
- Lee Moon-jung as Eun-yi
- Choi Byung-mo as Kim Tae-hyung
- Gi Ju-bong as Detective squad chief
- Son Young-soon as Byeong-gook's mother

== Awards and nominations ==
Year	Category	Recipient	Result
36th Blue Dragon Film Awards	Best Supporting Actor	Bae Seong-woo	Nominated
2015 Cannes Film Festival	Caméra d'Or	Hong Won-chan	Nominated
KOFRA Film Awards	Discovery Award	Bae Seong-woo	Won
