= Minority Opinion =

2015 film by Kim Sung-je

- Theatrical poster
- Directed by: Kim Sung-je
- Written by: Kim Sung-je
- Based on: Minority Opinion by Son A-ram
- Produced by: Im Yeong-ho; Cheon Sung-il
- Starring: Yoon Kye-sang; Yoo Hae-jin; Kim Ok-vin
- Cinematography: Kim Dong-young
- Edited by: Kim Sang-bum
- Music by: Jo Yeong-wook
- Production companies: Cinema Service; Harimao Pictures
- Distributed by: 9ers Entertainment
- Release date: June 24, 2015
- Running time: 126 minutes
- Country: South Korea
- Language: Korean
- Box office: US$2.6 million

Minority Opinion (Korean: 소수의견; RR: Sosuuigyeon), released internationally as The Unfair, is a 2015 South Korean legal drama film written and directed by Kim Sung-je, starring Yoon Kye-sang, Yoo Hae-jin and Kim Ok-vin. It was adapted from Sohn Ah-ram's novel of the same name, which in turn was based on the Yongsan Tragedy, in which 40 tenants protesting against insufficient compensation for the urban renewal redevelopment of their Yongsan neighborhood clashed with riot police on January 20, 2009, that resulted in the death of five tenant-evictees and one police officer.

== Plot ==
Tenants who have been evicted from their homes are in the middle of a sit-in protest, when the police arrive. A 20-year-old police officer and a 16-year-old boy, the son of a demonstrator, end up dead. The boy's father, Park Jae-ho gets arrested for the cop's death, but he insists it was self-defense and that he had only been trying to protect his son from being beaten by the riot police. Rookie public defender Yoon Jin-won is initially doubtful of Park's claims, until he gets approached by reporter Gong Soo-kyung who has her own suspicions about the government's account of the incident. Yoon then teams up with fellow lawyer Jang Dae-seok to pursue the truth through a jury trial.

== Cast ==
- Yoon Kye-sang as Yoon Jin-won
- Yoo Hae-jin as Jang Dae-seok
- Kim Ok-vin as Gong Soo-kyung
- Lee Geung-young as Park Jae-ho
- Jang Gwang as Kim Hee-taek's father
- Kim Eui-sung as Prosecutor
- Kwon Hae-hyo as Judge
- Kim Hyeong-jong as Kim Soo-man
- Noh Young-hak as Kim Hee-taek
- Oh Yeon-ah as Yoo In-ha
- Kwak In-joon as Park Kyung-chul
- Uhm Tae-goo as Lee Seung-joon
- Jo Bok-rae as Public prosecutor
- Kim Jong-soo as Jo Goo-hwan
- Park Gyu-chae as Professor Yeom
- Ahn Sang-woo as Moon Hee-sung
- Choi Soo-han as Park Shin-woo
- Yoon Dong-hwan as Assistant prosecutor general
- Park Hae-soo as Goo-hwan's assistant
- Park Chul-min as Judge Kim Joon-bae (cameo)

== Release ==
The shoot wrapped on June 3, 2013, but because of the film's political content, it took two years to find a distributor. Minority Opinion received a theatrical release on June 24, 2015.

== Awards and nominations ==
Year	Award	Category	Recipient	Result
2015	24th Buil Film Awards	Best Supporting Actor	Lee Geung-young	Won
2015	24th Buil Film Awards	Best Screenplay	Kim Sung-je, Son A-ram	Won
2015	24th Buil Film Awards	Best Cinematography	Kim Dong-young	Nominated
2015	35th Korean Association of Film Critics Awards	Top 10 Films of the Year	Minority Opinion	Won
2015	36th Blue Dragon Film Awards	Best Supporting Actor	Lee Geung-young	Nominated
2015	36th Blue Dragon Film Awards	Best New Director	Kim Sung-je	Nominated
2015	36th Blue Dragon Film Awards	Best Screenplay	Kim Sung-je, Son A-ram	Won
2016	52nd Baeksang Arts Awards	Best Supporting Actor (Film)	Lee Geung-young	Won
2016	52nd Baeksang Arts Awards	Best New Director (Film)	Kim Sung-je	Nominated

== See also ==
- Two Doors, a 2012 documentary about the same incident
