= Sohn Ah-ram =

South Korean novelist (born 1980)

Sohn Ah-ram (Korean: 손아람; born 1980) is a South Korean novelist. He made his literary debut in 2008 with the autobiographical novel Jinsili malsodwen peiji (진실이 말소된 페이지, The Page Where Truth Has Been Erased). His full-length novel Sosu uigyeon (소수의견, Minority Opinion) (2010), based on the Yongsan Tragedy and corruption in the Korean judiciary system, won him much recognition. With interests ranging from feminism to gender minority issues, Sohn remains active as a public speaker, TV panelist, and influencer.

== Life ==
Sohn studied aesthetics at Seoul National University. From his high school years to his early twenties, he performed as a rapper under the pseudonym Sohnjeondosa (Evangelist Sohn) in a band that he called Jinsili Malsodwen Peiji, using a phrase lifted from Yi-sang’s short story “The Wings” (1936). After gaining fame in the underground hip hop scene, he signed with a major label; however, although he had finished recording his debut album, he was unable to release the album and quit his music career after a legal dispute with the company. His experiences with the subsequent litigation became a valuable asset in writing Sosu uigyeon (2010). In 2008, he announced Jinsili malsodwen peiji (2008), a work of fiction based on the legal battles he experienced as a rapper. In 2010, he released the novel Sosu uigyeon that deals with the many issues that occurred during the court proceedings of the Yongsan Tragedy. Having participated in the film adaptation of this work, he received the award for best screenplay at the 2015 Buil Film Award and Blue Dragon Awards. In the book’s film version, The Unfair, Sohn appears in a brief cameo as an employee at the Ministry of Justice. Criticizing the established power structure in the publication industry among publishers, famous authors, and literary awards, in 2015 he took to his Facebook page to argue for a complete abolition of all prizes in literature. Following that, he announced he will establish his own award, a parody of the existing system called World’s Best Book Prize with a cash prize of 10 billion Korean won that will go to the winning title. Sohn declared this award will stay in place until all submissions-based literature prizes are discontinued. Going further, he announced that his third novel D Minus (2014) would receive the first World’s Best Book Prize. Other than creative writing, Sohn is active as a columnist, TV panelist and public speaker, and he also expresses his opinions frequently on Facebook.

== Works ==
=== Jinsili malsodwen peiji (2008) ===
Sohn Ah-ram’s first novel Jinsili malsodwen peiji (2008) is an autobiographical coming-of-age novel that draws upon the underground hip hop scene. This work employs a form of fact fiction that combines known facts together with elements of fiction. The novel introduces actual bands and real-life artists as characters while also incorporating the author’s autobiographical experiences and various fictional elements.

=== Sosu uigyeon (2010) ===
The legal troubles Sohn experienced during his time as a rapper led to his successful hit Sosu uigyeon (2010). Sosu uigyeon describes the Yongsan Tragedy that occurred as a result of riot police clashing against several evictees in a neighborhood that had been planned for redevelopment, as well as the ensuing legal battle. Going beyond a simple good-versus-evil pitting of the characters, the novel vividly illustrates the legal proceedings and the overall judicial world, while speaking out against the illusions surrounding the judicial system and questioning the relationship between state and citizens, fact and truth, and law and justice.

The author’s criticism against the judicial system and state power led to a critique on the influence of the publishing industry and the literary world at large. Sohn’s work Munhakui saeroeun saedae (문학의 새로운 세대 The New Generation of Literature) (2012) parodies this power and the literary institutions by placing a veteran literary critic and a successful writer, who are also sworn enemies, in the same room as judges for a creative writing contest.

=== D Minus (2014) ===
D Minus (2014) follows the lives of college students deeply engaged in the protest movement of the 1990s, who find that they have lost a certain grand discourse and a common objective. The author describes his personal experiences in 154 short vignettes that together form a mosaic that illustrates the realities of an era.

== Bibliography ==
=== Novels ===
- Jinsili malsodwen peiji, volumes 1-2, Dulnyouk, 2008.
- Sosu uigyeon, Dulnyouk, 2010.
- D Minus, Jaeumgwa Moeum, 2014.

=== Short story collections ===
- “The New Generation of Literature” (Illustrated by Seong Lip), Mimesis, 2018.

=== Column Contributions ===
- “Creating a World,” Wurihakgyo, 2018.

=== Co-Authorship ===
- Ha Jong-gang, Lim Seung-su, Sohn Ah-ram, et al., “Jeon Tae-il Biography: The Jeon Tae-il of Our Times,” You Are Me, Cheolsuwa Yeonghui, 2010.
- Kim Miwol, Kim Sa-gwa, Kim Ae-ran, et al., “The New Generation of Literature,” Would You Like to Format?, Hankyoreh, 2012.
- “What the Prosecutors Really Wanted to Hide,” “The Tower of Babel That Came Crashing Down in Yongsan,” The Advocates, Gungri, 2014.
- Kim Dong-chun, Kim Chan-ho, Cho Guk, et al., To Those Who Won’t Allow Us to Make the Barest Minimum: Fake Livelihood vs. Real Livelihood, Bookcomma, 2016.
- Jeong Hui-jin, Seo Min, Sohn Ah-ram, et al., “Women in Popular Culture,” Feminism Now X Democracy: The Front Lines of Feminism of Our Times, Goyuseoga, 2018.
- Lee Jun-seok and Sohn Ah-ram, I Agree With That Opinion, 21 Century Books, 2018.

== Awards ==
- 2015 24th Buil Film Award, Best Screenplay for Minority Opinion
- 2015 36th Blue Dragon Awards, Best Screenplay for Minority Opinion

== See also ==
- Yongsan Tragedy
