= Dare to Love Me =

Dare to Love Me may refer to:

- Dare to Love Me (song), from the 2022 Avril Lavigne album Love Sux
- Dare to Love Me (TV series), a South Korean TV series
