= Our Season =

2023 South Korean film

- Theatrical release poster
- Hangul: 3일의 휴가
- Lit.: 3 Days Vacation
- RR: 3irui hyuga
- MR: 3irŭi hyuga
- Directed by: Yook Sang-hyo
- Screenplay by: Yoo Young-ah
- Produced by: Shin Yeong-il
- Starring: Kim Hae-sook; Shin Min-a; Kang Ki-young; Hwang Bo-ra
- Distributed by: Showbox
- Release date: December 6, 2023
- Running time: 105 minutes
- Country: South Korea
- Language: Korean
- Box office: US$3.7 million

Our Season (Korean: 3일의 휴가; lit. '3 Days Vacation') is a 2023 South Korean fantasy drama film directed by Yook Sang-hyo, starring Kim Hae-sook, Shin Min-a, Kang Ki-young, and Hwang Bo-ra. The film is about a miraculous moment that happens when a mother comes down from the sky on a three-day vacation and stays with her daughter. It was released theatrically on December 6, 2023.

== Synopsis ==
There is a mother, Bok-ja, who died alone, and a daughter, Jin-joo, who inadvertently lost her mother. Their reunion is thanks to the vacation on earth that Bok-ja received from heaven. Bok-ja begins a journey limited to three days, led by the guide who accompanied her from the afterlife. During this period, Bok-ja looks after her daughter Jin-joo, and although not visible, she feels the presence of her mother Bok-ja hovering around her. The two women, who have a new opportunity to communicate, look back on the past and the present, sharing fantastic moments.

== Cast ==
- Kim Hae-sook as Park Bok-ja, Jin-joo mother.
- Shin Min-a as Bang Jin-joo, Bok-ja's daughter who runs a Baekban restaurant using her mother's recipes.
- Kang Ki-young as guide who guides the Blessed One to another world
- Hwang Bo-ra as Mi-jin, Jin-joo's old friend.
- Park Myung-hoon
- Kim Min-Kyung

== Production ==
Filming began in January 2020 and ended in March 2020.

== Reception ==
=== Box office ===
As of January 24, 2024, Our Season has grossed $3.7 million with a running total of 514,539 tickets sold.
