= The Naked Kitchen =

- Theatrical release poster
- Directed by: Hong Ji-young
- Written by: Hong Ji-young; Lee Jyeong-ui
- Produced by: Min Jin-su; Min Kyu-dong; Lee Jun-yeop
- Starring: Shin Min-a; Ju Ji-hoon; Kim Tae-woo
- Cinematography: Jung Il-sung
- Edited by: Hyeon Dong-chun
- Music by: Jeong Sung-jo
- Release date: February 5, 2009
- Running time: 102 minutes
- Country: South Korea
- Language: Korean
- Box office: $638,181

The Naked Kitchen (Korean: 키친; RR: Kichin; lit. 'Kitchen') is a 2009 South Korean romantic comedy-drama film written and directed by Hong Ji-young. Starring Shin Min-a, Ju Ji-hoon, and Kim Tae-woo, the film is a romantic comedy-drama about a very curious ménage à trois.

== Plot ==
Ahn Mo-rae and Han Sang-in have been friends since childhood. He didn't mind that she followed him around, calling him hyeong or Big Brother (though Korean girls are supposed to call older guys oppa), and their marital relationship is an odd but appealing mix of hot sex and best buddies.

On their wedding anniversary, Mo-rae serves breakfast on their best china, in hopes of being intimate before Sang-in leaves for work. Sang-in quits his stockbroker job to pursue his dream of opening a restaurant.

While shopping for an anniversary gift for Sang-in, Mo-rae sneaks into a closed gallery, where she encounters another illicit visitor—a very handsome young man with whom she hides when the gallery owner turns up. Mo-rae, overcome by heat and dizziness, has a sudden sexual encounter with the stranger, who then vanishes. She confesses the incident to her husband, downplaying it both to him and to herself.

Sang-in tells Mo-rae over dinner that he is expecting a mentor to help him plan the menu for his dream restaurant: a brilliant young French-Korean chef who will arrive that evening. Park Du-re, French-Korean mentor, turns out to be Mo-rae's stranger, who now will be staying with the young couple, sleeping in the room that had belonged to Sang-in's late mother.

With her husband blissfully unaware of Du-re's identity, he encourages Mo-rae to get along with him. Mo-rae is powerfully drawn to Du-re while Sang-in gets cooking lessons from him, leading the poor woman to somewhat of a crisis as she tries to decide what her heart really wants. In the end, however, Mo-rae eventually decides to leave them both.

== Cast ==
- Shin Min-a as Ahn Mo-rae
- Ju Ji-hoon as Park Du-re
- Kim Tae-woo as Han Sang-in
- Jeon Hye-jin as Kim Seon-woo
- Park Sang-hun as Kwon Joo-hyeok
- Jung So-yeon as Kwon Ye-rim
- Kwon Hyeok-poong as cooking competition sponsor
- Kim Won-joo as cooking competition sponsor
- Kwon Yeong-gook as cooking competition sponsor
- Kim Bo-yeong as gallery curator
- Min Seong-wook as bond company junior colleague
- Kim Joo-yeong as parasol store student couple
- Baek Jin-hee as parasol store student couple
- Bang Eun-jin as cooking judge
- Ahn Hye-kyung as radio weather forecaster
- Chae Yoon-seo as bride at wedding shoot
- Lee Hwan as groom at wedding shoot

== Notes ==
Actors Shin Min-ah and Ju Ji-hoon previously starred together in the 2007 television series The Devil.
