= Diva (2020 film) =

2020 South Korean thriller film

- Promotional poster
- Hangul: 디바
- RR: Diba
- MR: Tiba
- Directed by: Cho Seul-ye
- Written by: Seul-yeah Jo; Young-sun Yoo
- Produced by: Yo-Hwan Kim
- Starring: Shin Min-a; Lee Yoo-young
- Cinematography: Kim Sun-ryung
- Edited by: Choi Min-young, Park Kyung-sook; Kim Woo-hyun
- Music by: Kim Jun-seong
- Production companies: OAL Co. Ltd.; A&G Modes Co., Ltd.; 88 Avenue Co., Ltd.
- Distributed by: Megabox JoongAng Plus M; Korea Investment Partners Co., Ltd.
- Release date: September 23, 2020
- Running time: 84 minutes
- Country: South Korea
- Language: Korean
- Box office: est. US$783,081

Diva (Korean: 디바) is a 2020 Korean thriller film directed by Cho Seul-ye, starring Shin Min-a and Lee Yoo-young. The film marks the directorial debut of Cho Seul-ye and revolves around a competitive diver (Shin Min-a) and her best friend and rival (Lee Yoo-young), who goes missing after the two are involved in a car accident. It was released in Korea on September 23, 2020.

The title of the film was suggested by director Park Chan-wook, who reviewed an early draft of the screenplay. Cho found that the word translated to "goddess" in Italian, but to "demon" in Arabic; she appreciated the dual meaning, and so adopted it as the title of her film.

The film received two nominations in the 41st Blue Dragon Film Awards: for Best Leading Actress (Shin); and for Best Cinematography and Lighting.

== Synopsis ==
Yi-young (Shin Min-a) has all the talent to be a 'Diving Diva'. She misses her best friend Soo-jin (Lee Yoo-young), so she changes her event to synchronizing swimming. While into olympics selection practice, they are involved in a freak accident, Soo-jin disappears and Yi-young loses her memory. As she gets her memory back, she remembers strange side of Soo-jin. She begins to lose her control on the diving board.

== Cast ==
- Shin Min-a as Yi-young
  - Kwak Ji-hye as young Yi-young
- Lee Yoo-young as Soo-jin
  - Choe Dain as young Soo-jin
- Lee Kyu-hyung as Diving coach
- Joo Suk-tae as CEO Lee
- Oh Ha-nee as Kang Cho-ah, super child
- Park Sung-yeon as Detective Oh
- Yoongeum Sun-ah as Hwang Hyeon-shin
- Park Choong-seon as president
- Heo Hyeong-gyu as detective Kang
- Bae So-young as nurse
- Oh Hee-joon as Reporter at Hospital
- Ji Yi-soo as Lee Yeong's agency representative

== Production ==
Filming began on July 16, 2018 and was wrapped up on November 5, 2018.

== Release ==
The film was released theatrically on September 23, 2020 in South Korea.

Diva was invited at 25th Bucheon International Fantastic Film Festival held in July 2021. It was showcased in Korean Fantastic features section.

== Awards and nominations ==
Year	Award	Category	Recipient	Result	Ref.
2021	41st Blue Dragon Film Awards	Best Leading Actress	Shin Min-a	Nominated	
2021	41st Blue Dragon Film Awards	Best Cinematography and Lighting	Kim Sun-ryung: Cinematography; Cho Gyu-young: Lighting	Nominated	
