= Lee Seung-ho (actor) =

South Korean actor

- Born: Lee Seung-ho; 26 February 1991 (age 35); South Korea
- Other names: Seung Ho, Lee
- Education: Hanyang University (Department of Theater and Film)
- Occupations: Actor, Model
- Years active: 2012–present
- Agent: HappyFace Entertainment
- Known for: Who Are You: School 2015; Oh My Venus; Pinocchio

Lee Seung-ho (born February 26, 1991) is a South Korean actor and model. He is best known for his supporting roles in various dramas. Lee also appeared in the school series Who Are You: School 2015 as Seung-Ho. He also appeared in Oh My Venus and Pinocchio.

== Filmography ==
=== Television ===
Year	Title	Role	Ref.
2012	Operation Proposal	Min-ho	
2013	Golden Rainbow	Seo Tae-yeong (Young)	
2014	Gap-dong	Kim Shin-yong	
2014	Flower Grandpa Investigation Unit	Jung Myung-ho (Young)	
2014	Blade Man	Yoon-seok	
2014	Pinocchio	Jo Dae-gook	
2015	Who Are You: School 2015	Seung-ho	
2015	Oh My Venus	Kim Yeong-joon	
2022	Today's Webtoon	Kang Tae-kyu	

=== Film ===
Year	Title	Role	Language	Ref.
2015	Wonderful Nightmare	Kyeong Ho	Korean	
2015	The Chronicles of Evil	Seung-ho	Korean	
