= Your Honor (2018 TV series) =

2018 South Korean television series

- Promotional poster
- Hangul: 친애하는 판사님께
- Hanja: 親愛하는 判事님께
- Lit.: Dear Judge
- RR: Chinaehaneun pansanimkke
- MR: Ch'inaehanŭn p'ansanimkke
- Genre: Legal drama Romance
- Created by: Park Young-soo
- Written by: Cheon Sung-il
- Directed by: Boo Sung-cheol
- Starring: Yoon Shi-yoon; Lee Yoo-young; Park Byung-eun; Kwon Nara
- Music by: Kim Joon-seok
- Country of origin: South Korea
- Original language: Korean
- No. of episodes: 32 (Note: In order to circumvent Korean laws that prevent commercial breaks in the middle of an episode, what would previously have been aired as single 70 minute episodes are now being repackaged as two 35 minute episodes, with two episodes being shown each night with a commercial break between the two.)

Production
- Executive producers: Teddy Jung; Park Hyung-ki
- Producer: Lee Ok-gyu
- Camera setup: Single-camera
- Running time: 35 minutes
- Production companies: The Story Works; iHQ

Original release
- Network: SBS TV
- Release: July 25 – September 20, 2018

Your Honor (Korean: 친애하는 판사님께) is a 2018 South Korean television series starring Yoon Shi-yoon, Lee Yoo-young, Park Byung-eun, and Kwon Nara. It aired on SBS TV from July 25 to September 20, 2018, every Wednesday and Thursday at 22:00 (KST).

== Synopsis ==
It tells the story of identical twin brothers who have the same level of intellect but lead entirely different lives.

== Cast ==
=== Main ===
- Yoon Shi-yoon as Han Kang-ho/Han Soo-ho (dual role)
  - Choi Min-young as young Kang-ho / Soo-ho

- Han Kang-ho: A five-time convicted criminal who takes over his twin's job after his sibling mysteriously disappears.
- Han Soo-ho: A top judge who is very attached to personal belongings.

- Lee Yoo-young as Song So-eun

A hard-working student in the Judicial Research and Training Institute.

- Park Byung-eun as Oh Sang-cheol

The heir to a law firm.

- Kwon Nara as Joo-eun

An anchorwoman who is Soo-ho's girlfriend.

=== Supporting ===
- Kim Hye-ok as Im Geum-mi
- Kwak Sun-young as Song Ji-yeon
- Sung Dong-il as Sa Ma-ryong
- Heo Sung-tae as Hong Jung-soo
- Kim Myung-gon as Oh Dae-yang
- Yoon Na-moo as Lee Ho-sung
- Shin Sung-min as Park Jae-hyung
- Heo Ji-won as Jin Wook-tae
- Park Ji-hyun as Park Hae-na
- Kim Kang-hyun as Section Chief Jo Bok-soo
- Ha Kyung as Ji Chang-soo
- Hwang Seok-jeong as Lee Ha-yeon
- Go On as Kang In-gyoo
- Han Soo-yeon as Bang Woo-jeong

=== Others ===
- Lee Ki-hyuk as Choi Min-kook
- Kang Ki-dung as high school student
- Jo Seung-yeon

=== Special appearance ===
- Jung Min-sung as Chef Shin
- Woo Hyun as staff at National Institute of Scientific Investigation

== Production ==
The first script reading took place in June 2018 at SBS Ilsan Production Center in Tanhyun, South Korea.

== Original soundtrack ==
Your Honor OST

Soundtrack album by Various Artists
- Released: 2018
- Genre: Soundtrack
- Languages: Korean; English
- Label: Vlending

=== Part 1 ===
Released on August 1, 2018
No.	Title	Lyrics	Music	Artist	Length
1.	"Comfort" (위로)	Seo Dong-sung	Park Sung-il	Jung In	4:11
2.	"Comfort" (Inst.)		Park Sung-il		4:11
Total length:					8:22

=== Part 2 ===
Released on August 15, 2018
No.	Title	Lyrics	Music	Artist	Length
1.	"Shine"	Lee Chi-hoon	Choi Jae-man	Kim E-Z	3:51
2.	"Shine" (Inst.)		Choi Jae-man		3:51
Total length:					7:42

=== Part 3 ===
Released on August 22, 2018
No.	Title	Lyrics	Music	Artist	Length
1.	"One Day, To Me" (어느 날의 나에게)	Kim Ho-kyung	1601	Monday Kiz	3:46
2.	"One Day, To Me" (Inst.)		1601		3:46
Total length:					7:32

=== Part 4 ===
Released on August 29, 2018
No.	Title	Lyrics	Music	Artist	Length
1.	"I See" (내가 보여)	Seo Dong-sung	Park Sung-il	Damon	4:31
2.	"I See" (Inst.)		Park Sung-il		4:31
Total length:					9:02

=== Part 5 ===
Released on September 5, 2018
No.	Title	Lyrics	Music	Artist	Length
1.	"Home"	Kang Eden	Jamie Song	Raina	4:40
2.	"Home" (Inst.)		Jamie Song		4:40
Total length:					9:20

=== Part 6 ===
Released on September 12, 2018
No.	Title	Lyrics	Music	Artist	Length
1.	"Remember That Time" (그 시간을 기억해)	Ha Neul-hae	Ha Neul-hae	Ha Neul-hae	4:06
2.	"Remember That Time" (Inst.)		Ha Neul-hae		4:06
Total length:					8:12

== Ratings ==
Ep.	Broadcast date	Average audience share			
Ep.	Broadcast date	TNmS		Nielsen Korea	
Ep.	Broadcast date	Nationwide	Seoul	Nationwide	Seoul
1	July 25, 2018	4.8%	5.0%	5.2% (20th)	5.4% (NR)
2	July 25, 2018	5.9%	6.1%	6.3% (13th)	6.5% (14th)
3	July 26, 2018	6.4%	7.3%	7.0% (11th)	7.9% (7th)
4	July 26, 2018	6.7%	7.9%	7.7% (7th)	8.8% (5th)
5	August 1, 2018	4.9%	5.2%	5.3% (19th)	5.6% (18th)
6	August 1, 2018	6.1%	6.6%	6.4% (13th)	6.9% (9th)
7	August 2, 2018	6.5%	6.7%	5.8% (14th)	6.1% (12th)
8	August 2, 2018	6.9%	7.5%	7.1% (10th)	7.7% (5th)
9	August 8, 2018	5.1%	5.4%	5.6% (19th)	5.9% (17th)
10	August 8, 2018	6.2%	6.3%	7.1% (9th)	7.2% (7th)
11	August 9, 2018	6.4%	6.6%	6.5% (14th)	6.7% (11th)
12	August 9, 2018	7.7%	8.0%	7.9% (9th)	8.2% (7th)
13	August 15, 2018	5.5%	6.7%	6.8% (14th)	8.0% (6th)
14	August 15, 2018	6.8%	8.2%	8.6% (9th)	10.0% (4th)
15	August 16, 2018	6.3%	7.1%	6.8% (11th)	7.7% (8th)
16	August 16, 2018	7.6%	8.5%	8.3% (7th)	9.2% (3rd)
17	August 22, 2018 (Note: Delayed to 10.10pm due to coverage of the 2018 Asian Games.)	4.9%	5.6%	5.4% (19th)	6.0% (18th)
18	August 22, 2018	6.6%	7.1%	7.3% (11th)	7.8% (6th)
19	August 29, 2018 (Note: No episodes were aired on 23 August due to coverage of the 2018 Asian Games.)	6.4%	6.9%	7.1% (18th)	7.6% (15th)
20	August 29, 2018	7.9%	8.5%	8.4% (13th)	9.0% (8th)
21	September 5, 2018 (Note: No episodes were aired on 30 August due to the broadcast of the movie, The Sheriff in Town.)	5.4%	N/A	5.9% (16th)	6.7% (12th)
22	September 5, 2018	6.3%	N/A	7.3% (11th)	8.0% (5th)
23	September 6, 2018	6.7%	N/A	6.4% (14th)	6.8% (11th)
24	September 6, 2018	7.3%	N/A	7.8% (9th)	8.1% (7th)
25	September 12, 2018	N/A	N/A	5.6% (19th)	6.0% (17th)
26	September 12, 2018	N/A	N/A	7.7% (8th)	8.5% (5th)
27	September 13, 2018	6.7%	N/A	7.5% (9th)	7.9% (8th)
28	September 13, 2018	7.4%	N/A	8.6% (7th)	9.1% (4th)
29	September 19, 2018	5.0%	N/A	6.3% (10th)	6.4% (9th)
30	September 19, 2018	6.5%	N/A	8.3% (3rd)	8.6% (3rd)
31	September 20, 2018	6.0%	N/A	6.3% (7th)	7.2% (5th)
32	September 20, 2018	7.1%	N/A	8.4% (4th)	9.2% (5th)
Average		— (Note: Due to some unpublished ratings, the exact average rating is unknown.)	—	6.96%	7.52%
In the table above, the blue numbers represent the lowest published ratings and the red numbers represent the highest published ratings.; NR denotes that the drama did not rank in the top 20 daily programs on that date.; N/A denotes that the rating is not known.

== Awards and nominations ==
Year	Award	Category	Nominee	Result	Ref.
2018	6th APAN Star Awards	Best New Actress	Lee Yoo-young	Nominated	
2018	2nd The Seoul Awards	Best New Actress	Lee Yoo-young	Nominated	
2018	SBS Drama Awards	Excellence Award, Actor in a Wednesday-Thursday Drama	Yoon Shi-yoon	Won	
2018	SBS Drama Awards	Excellence Award, Actor in a Wednesday-Thursday Drama	Lee Yoo-young	Nominated	
2018	SBS Drama Awards	Best Supporting Actor	Heo Sung-tae	Nominated	
2018	SBS Drama Awards	Best New Actress	Lee Yoo-young	Won	
2018	SBS Drama Awards	Best New Actress	Kwon Nara	Nominated	
