= Shin Min-a =

South Korean actress (born 1984)

- Shin at the 2026 Busan International Film Festival
- Born: Yang Min-a; April 5, 1984 (age 42); Yecheon County, North Gyeongsang Province, South Korea
- Education: Dongguk University
- Occupations: Actress; model
- Years active: 1998–present
- Agent: AM Entertainment
- Spouse: Kim Woo-bin (m. 2025)

Korean name
- Hangul: 양민아
- RR: Yang Mina
- MR: Yang Mina

Stage name
- Hangul: 신민아
- RR: Sin Mina
- MR: Sin Mina
- Website: shinmina.co.kr

Signature
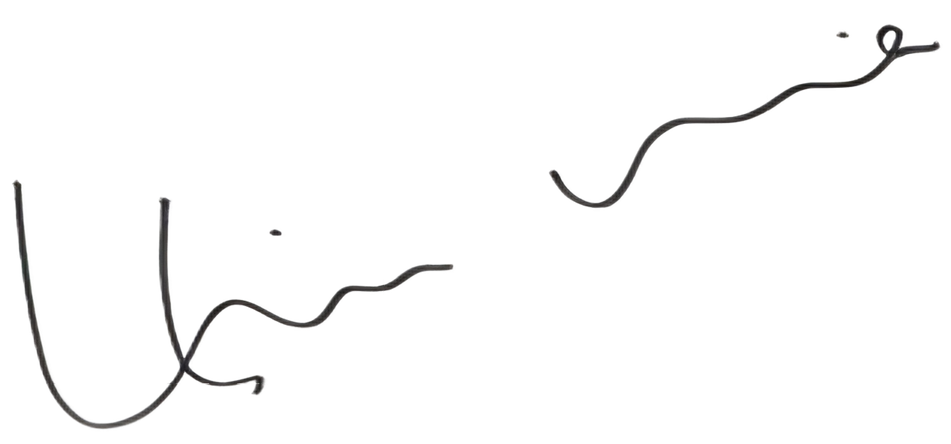

Yang Min-a (Korean: 양민아; born April 5, 1984), better known by the stage name Shin Min-a (신민아), is a South Korean actress who began her career as a model before debuting as an actress in 2000. She is known for her leading roles in television dramas A Love to Kill (2005), My Girlfriend Is a Gumiho (2010), Arang and the Magistrate (2012), Oh My Venus (2015), Hometown Cha-Cha-Cha (2021), Our Blues (2022), No Gain No Love (2024), and The Remarried Empress (2026).

== Career ==
=== 1998–2002: Beginnings as a model and acting debut ===
Shin began her modeling career in 1998 under her birth name, Yang Min-a, for the teen magazine KiKi. Her entry into the industry followed a first-place win in a magazine competition for which a friend had submitted her photo without her knowledge. She initially gained recognition through television commercials for brands such as Samsung and Korea Telecom 018, in which her catchphrase "Love moves about" became particularly popular among South Korean youth.

Shin started acting by starring in music videos. In 2000, she was cast in the high-budget music video for Jo Sung-mo's "Do You Know", as a Vietnamese girl who falls in love with a Korean soldier during the Vietnam War.

Ahead of her film debut in Volcano High, she adopted the stage name Shin Min-a, to avoid confusion with the actress Yang Mi-ra. While Volcano High started production earlier, her first appearance as an actress was in the melodrama Beautiful Days. She took five months of acting lessons in preparation for her role. Regarding it, she stated to The Dong-A Ilbo: "It was a completely different role than my regular image [...] At first, it was awkward, but I'm confident I won't get criticized for 'clumsy acting'."

=== 2003–2011: Rising popularity and breakthrough ===
In 2003, she took the main role in the college romance movie Madeleine with Zo In-sung. For her role as a hairdresser, she practiced hairdressing for three months before the movie started filming. She then took on her first main TV role as a boxer in the series Punch, training under the wing of the boxer Kim Ju-hee for two months. The drama's director, Lee Hyun-jik, praised her, saying, "Min-a might be a rookie actor, but she's so enthusiastic sometimes we worry someone might get hurt, and she also excels in expressing emotions." Her role earned her a New Star Award at the 2003 SBS Drama Awards.

In 2005, she took on a supporting role in Kim Jee-woon's noir film A Bittersweet Life, reuniting her with previous co-star Lee Byung-hun. She then portrayed a deaf character in Sad Movie. This was followed by leading roles in the melodrama A Love to Kill with Rain, romantic comedy series The Beast and the Beauty with Ryoo Seung-bum, and psychological thriller Lucifer with Uhm Tae-woong and Ju Ji-hoon. In the 2007 film My Mighty Princess, Shin simultaneously played two characters. After her travels were documented on the cable channel O'live in 2008, Shin published a book titled Shin Min-a's French Diary in 2009.

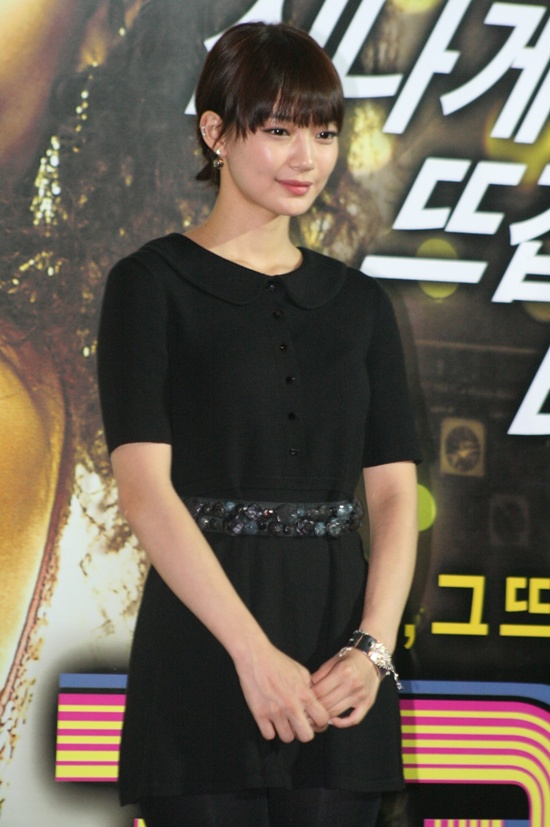
Shin at the Go Go 70s press conference in 2008

In the 2008 film Go Go 70s, Shin played a sexy counterculture singer and won numerous accolades for her portrayal. She then acted as an unfaithful wife in The Naked Kitchen, and a cynical young woman in search of her father in Sisters on the Road, a critically acclaimed indie film which also stars fellow actress and close friend Gong Hyo-jin. But Shin became best known for her portrayals of supernatural horror icons revamped into endearingly innocent yet spunky heroines in the rom-com My Girlfriend Is a Gumiho (2010).

=== 2012–2021: Leading roles and international success ===
Shin starred in the historical drama Arang and the Magistrate (2012). After appearing in The X, a 2013 spy thriller short film directed by Kim Jee-woon, Shin returned to the big screen in 2014 with Gyeongju, an introspective arthouse romance opposite Park Hae-il. This was followed by the romantic comedy film My Love, My Bride, where she and Jo Jung-suk played a newly married couple; it was a remake of the same-titled 1990 hit that starred Choi Jin-sil and Park Joong-hoon.

In 2015, Shin and So Ji-sub were cast in the romantic comedy series Oh My Venus. For her character, an overweight lawyer, Shin underwent a three-hour makeup/prosthetic session every shoot. At the 2015 KBS Drama Awards, Shin won the Excellence Award, the Best Actress in a Miniseries award, and the Best Couple Award with So Ji-sub. She also won the Outstanding Korean Actress award at the 11th Seoul International Drama Awards. In 2016, Shin was cast opposite Lee Je-hoon in the fantasy melodrama Tomorrow, With You, portraying a 30-year-old amateur photographer who finds out that her better half can time travel. The drama was fully pre-produced and premiered in February 2017.

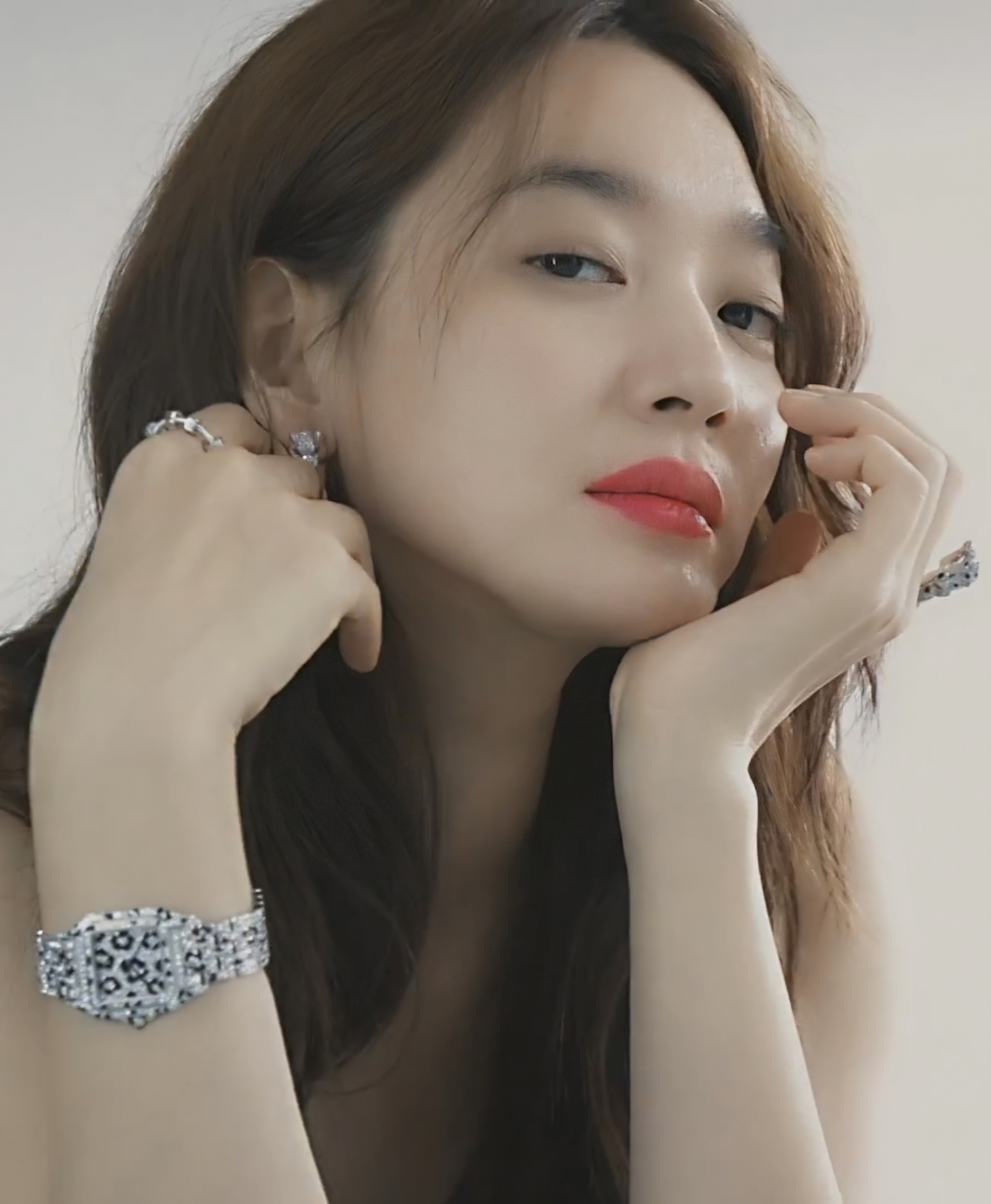
Shin in 2018

Shin took a break from acting for two years. In 2018, Shin was cast opposite Lee Yoo-young in the mystery film Diva, playing Yi Young, a diver who lost her memory after an accident. The film marks the directorial debut of Cho Seul-ye. It was showcased in the Korean Fantastic features section at the 25th Bucheon International Fantastic Film Festival held in July 2021. In 2019, Shin returned to the small screen after three years in the political drama Chief of Staff opposite Lee Jung-jae, as Kang Seon-yeong, a lawyer turned politician. In winter 2019, Shin reprised her role for the second season.

In 2021, Shin reunited with director Yoo Je-won in Hometown Cha-Cha-Cha, starring Kim Seon-ho and Lee Sang-yi. She played the role Yoon Hye-jin, a dentist who moved from the city to open a clinic in the seaside village of Gongjin. It was a remake of 2004 film Mr. Handy, Mr. Hong, which starred Uhm Jung-hwa and Kim Joo-hyuk. The series became a domestic hit with audience ratings peaking at 13.322% and went on to become one of the highest-rated television series on Korean cable television history. Following its release on Netflix, Hometown Cha-Cha-Cha became one of the platform's most-watched non-English television shows. It remained on Netflix's non-English popular television show list for 16 weeks, and reached the top 10 charts in more than 20 countries. It also on Netflix's Top 10 Chart for television shows for more than two months from its last episode. She has also contributed her vocals to several singles and soundtracks.

=== 2022–present: Continued success ===
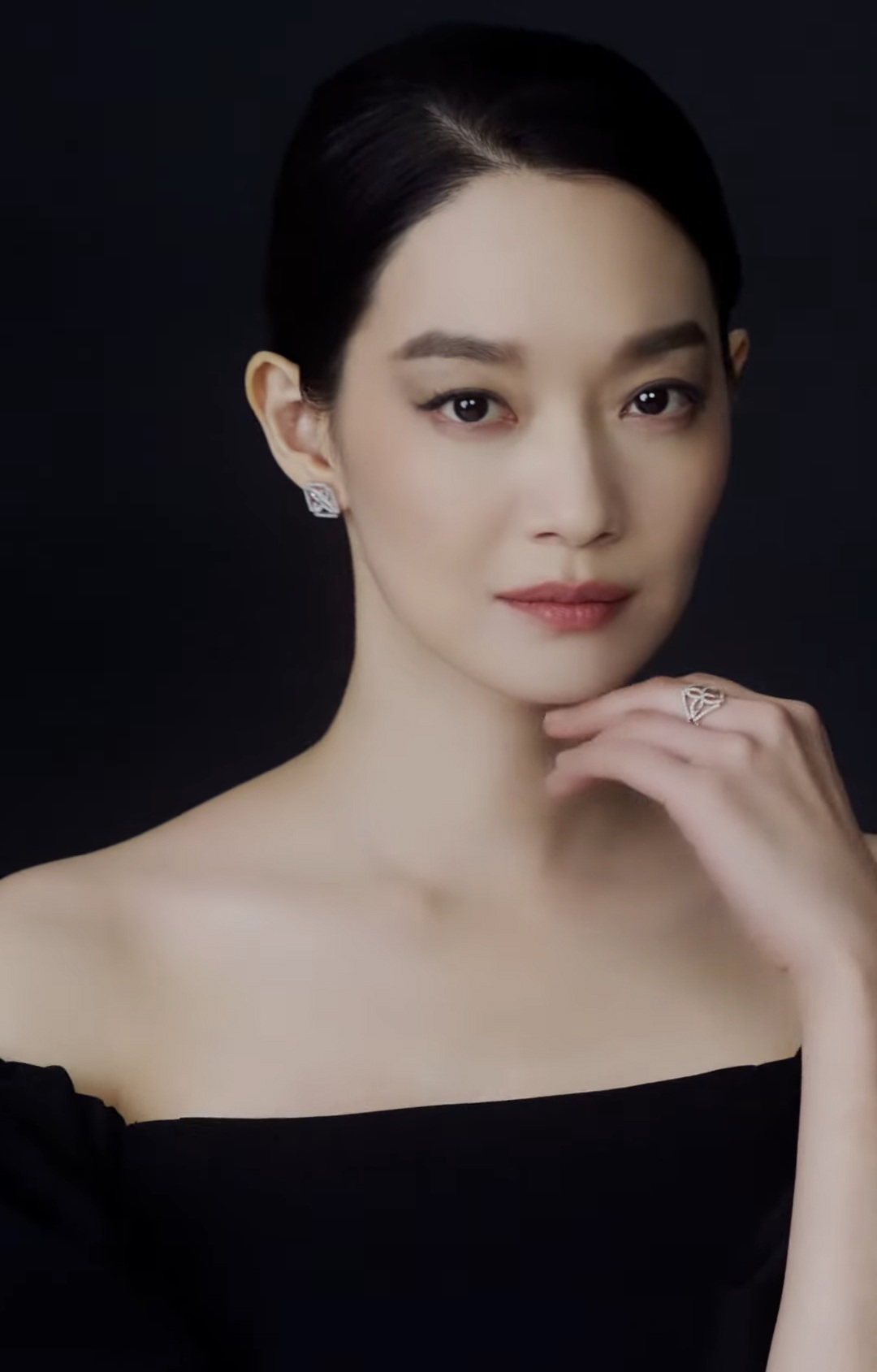
Shin in 2022

Shin starred in Noh Hee-kyung's omnibus drama Our Blues. Shin played Min Seon-ah, a divorcee with one child who came to Jeju and met her childhood friend Lee Dong-seok. It premiered on tvN on April 9, 2022.

Shin was cast in the movie Our Season in 2020, which released in 2023. The film was her first big screen role in three years after the thriller Diva. Playing a woman whose dead mother gets a "trip from heaven" to visit her, Shin chose to appear in the film because of its heartwarming feel and relatable subject matter. She played against type with a gloomier character, as in her previous project, Our Blues—explaining her choice, she stated that she wanted to play a variety of roles. A writer for the Korean news outlet Dispatch, reviewing the movie, said Shin's performance with Kim Hae-sook was "like seeing a real mother and daughter". The same year Our Season was released, Shin also returned to television with the series No Gain No Love; it began airing in August 2024.

In 2025, Shin starred in Netflix's crime thriller television series Karma directed by Lee Il-hyung. It is based on the Kakao webtoon of the same name by Choi Hee-seon, about people who are unexpectedly entangled and destroy each other while pursuing their own desires.

Shin will appear in the MBC drama "Wednesday-Thursday-Friday," directed by Jung Dong-yoon, who helmed the Gyeongseong Creature, Hot Stove League in 2027.It tells the story of a second love beginning with a first love returning after 12 years.

== Other ventures ==
=== Endorsements ===
Along with Kim Hyo-jin, Kim Min-hee, and Yang Mi-ra, she was considered one of the "four teenage commercial stars", and a representative of the "N generation" (a Korean analogue to the millennial generation). She has since become one of the most in-demand and highest paid commercial endorsers in South Korea.

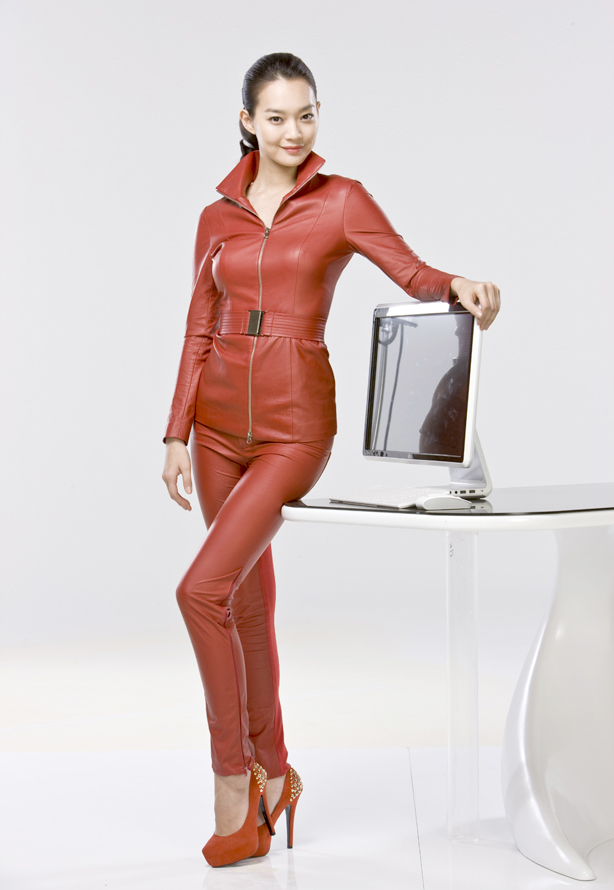
Shin for LG Xnote

Notable among her forays into branded entertainment is the 2008 multi-episode Summer Days opposite Hyun Bin and Ryoo Seung-bum for LG Xnote featuring music by You Hee-yeol, as well as Friends & Love, a movie-style extended advertisement for Giordano in 2011 costarring Jung Woo-sung and So Ji-sub. In 2009, Shin went to Milan, Italy to shoot a photo spread for Elle Korea with Calvin Klein model Jamie Dornan. In 2011, she was chosen as the first Asian model for the DIY Project ad campaign of American clothing brand Rag & bone, and in 2012 was featured in The New York Times' T Magazine.

Shin is a Roger Vivier's Maison ambassador for Korea. On November 11, 2021, she was appointed as Gucci's brand ambassador with Lee Jung-jae.

=== Philanthropy ===
Shin is a distinguished philanthropist whose cumulative contributions surpassed ₩4 billion by 2025. Her commitment to social welfare has been widely recognized, earning her a Presidential Citation in 2019 and the Good People Artist Award at the 14th Beautiful Artist Award in 2024. Her contributions already surpassing ₩1 billion by 2015 and reaching a milestone of ₩3.3 billion by the end of 2022. That year alone, her year-end gifts of ₩260 million to the Community Chest of Korea and Asan Medical Center brought her annual total to ₩360 million.

Shin has been a dedicated benefactor to medical sector, focusing on pediatric care and specialized treatment. Shin is a constant donor to the Community Chest of Korea. Since December 2009, she has donated ₩2 million monthly, supplemented by year-end gifts ranging from ₩50 million to ₩100 million. By 2015, her contributions totaled approximately ₩717 million. Per her wishes, these funds primarily support heating costs for the elderly living alone, medical expenses for children with burns, and education for immigrant children. In February 2020, she contributed ₩100 million to support medical staff and vulnerable groups during the COVID-19 pandemic.

In August 2014, she took part in the Ice Bucket Challenge. In October 2015, she participated in the "Ohui Beautiful Face Campaign" and personally donated a ₩50 million to Seoul National University Children's Hospital. In September 2016, she donated ₩50 million to the same hospital. Since 2015, she has been a supporter of the Hallym Burn Foundation. She participated in the "Let's Share the Heart" talent donation campaign in November 2016. She donated of ₩100 million in December 2020, and another ₩100 million in December 2021. Shin have been supporting Asan Medical Center since 2018. In December 2021, she donated ₩100 million each to Asan Medical Center and the Korean Developmental Society to support psychological treatment for children affected by prolonged COVID-19 infections.

In 2010, Shin donated ₩50 million to help build Korea's first multicultural school in Ansan, Gyeonggi Province. Shin has also maintained a long-term partnership with Good Friends, an organization she began supporting in 2010 after being introduced by writer Noh Hee-kyung. Since then, her cumulative donations of ₩290 million have funded essential services for North Korean defectors, specifically targeting single mothers and their children. Most recently, in December 2025, Shin and her husband, Kim Woo-bin, jointly donated ₩300 million through organizations such as the Hallym Burn Foundation and Good Friends to ensure medical access for low income families and those in difficult circumstances.

She has also donated to disaster relief. In May, Shin donated ₩100 million to Nepal earthquake relief efforts via The Korean branch of Join Together Society. In August 2020 she donated ₩50 million to Community Chest of Korea to assist victims of torrential rains. In March 2022, Shin donated ₩100 million to the Hope Bridge Korea Disaster Relief Association, (Note: The Hope Bridge Korea Disaster Relief Association is a non-profit organization established in 1961. It was founded by newspaper companies, broadcasting companies, and social organizations with the aim of providing assistance to individuals affected by unforeseen disasters. Originally known as the "Korea Flood Damage Response Committee," it initially focused on providing financial aid for the victims of Typhoon Sarah in 1959. In 1964, the organization was renamed the "Korea Disaster Response Association" to expand its relief efforts and promote a culture of donation within society. In 2001, with the amendment of the Disaster Relief Act, The Hope Bridge Korea Korea Disaster Relief Association became the only relief organization in the country authorized by the government to raise and distribute donations for domestic natural disasters.) to help victims of the wildfires in Uljin County. On February 8, 2023, Shin donated ₩50 million via the same NGO to help victims of the 2023 Turkey–Syria earthquake. In March 2025, Shin donated ₩50 million to the Korean Red Cross to help wildfire victims in the Ulsan, Gyeongbuk, and Gyeongnam.

== Personal life ==
On July 22, 2015, through their agencies, Shin and actor Kim Woo-bin confirmed their relationship. They met each other as models for the same fashion brand two months prior. In November 2025, Kim announced that they would be getting married in December. On December 20, their wedding took place at the Shilla Hotel in Seoul.

== Filmography ==
=== Film ===
Year	Title	Role	Notes	Ref.
2001	Volcano High	Yoo Chae-yi		
2003	Madeleine	Hee-jin		
2005	A Bittersweet Life	Hee-soo		
2005	Sad Movie	Ahn Su-eun		
2005	The Beast and the Beauty	Jang Hae-ju		
2007	My Mighty Princess	Kang So-hwi / Ok-soon		
2008	Go Go 70s	Mimi		
2008	Sisters on the Road	Park Myung-eun	Digital remaster in 2022	
2009	The Naked Kitchen	Ahn Mo-rae		
2009	A Million	Jo Yoo-jin		
2013	The X	Mia	Short film	
2014	Gyeongju	Gong Yoon-hee		
2014	My Love, My Bride	Mi-young		
2016	A Quiet Dream	Min-ah	Cameo	
2020	Diva	Lee Young		
2023	Our Season	Bang Jin-joo		
2026	The Eyes	Seo-jin / Seo-in		

=== Television series ===
Year	Title	Role	Notes	Ref.
2001	Beautiful Days	Lee Min-ji		
2003	Punch	Jang Yoo-bin		
2005	A Love to Kill	Cha Eun-seok		
2007	Lucifer	Seo Hae-in		
2010	My Girlfriend Is a Gumiho	Gu Mi-ho		
2012	Arang and the Magistrate	Arang / Lee Seo-rim		
2015–2016	Oh My Venus	Kang Joo-eun		
2017	Tomorrow, with You	Song Ma-rin		
2019	Chief of Staff	Kang Sun-young	Season 1–2	
2021	Hometown Cha-Cha-Cha	Yoon Hye-jin		
2022	Our Blues	Min Seon-ah		
2024	No Gain No Love	Son Hae-yeong		
2025	Karma	Lee Ju-yeon		
2026	The Remarried Empress	Navier		

=== Music video appearances ===
Year	Song title	Artist
1999	"A Request"	Lee Seung-hwan
1999	"Eyes Want to Travel"	Leon Lai
1999	"Love and Remembrance"	g.o.d
2000	"Since You Left Me"	g.o.d
2000	"Do You Know?"	Jo Sung-mo
2001	"With Coffee"	Brown Eyes
2001	"I Love You"	Cha Tae-hyun
2001	"Sad Love"	g.o.d
2001	"A Fool"	g.o.d
2001	"You Just Don't Know"	g.o.d
2008	"Summer Day"	You Hee-yeol feat. Shin Jae-pyung of Peppertones
2008	"My Happy Day"	You Hee-yeol feat. Shin Min-a
2009	"Miracle Blue"	Loveholics feat. Shin Min-a

== Discography ==
Title	Year	Album
"Oppa, I Love You"	2003	Punch OST
"Pray for Yoo-bin"	2003	Punch OST
"My Happy Day"	2008	You Hee-yeol – Summer Days
"Night Train"	2008	Go Go 70s OST
"A Year Later"	2009	The Naked Kitchen OST
"Miracle Blue"	2009	Loveholics – In the Air
"Sha la la"	2010	My Girlfriend Is a Gumiho OST
"I Can Give You All"	2010	My Girlfriend Is a Gumiho OST
"Black Moon"	2012	Arang and the Magistrate OST

== Bibliography ==
Picture books
Year	Title		Publisher	Published Date	ISBN	Ref.
Year	English	Korean	Publisher	Published Date	ISBN	Ref.
2009	Shin Min-a's French Diary	프렌치 다이어리 - 신민아의 시선, 그안의 파리	Namusu	March 4, 2009	ISBN 978-89-961881-2-4	

== Accolades ==
=== Awards and nominations ===
Name of the award ceremony, year presented, category, nominee of the award, and the result of the nomination
Award ceremony	Year	Category	Nominee / Work	Result	Ref.
APAN Star Awards	2022	Top Excellence Award, Actress in a Miniseries	Hometown Cha-Cha-Cha; Our Blues	Won	
APAN Star Awards	2022	Popularity Star Award, Actress	Hometown Cha-Cha-Cha	Nominated	
Baeksang Arts Awards	2015	Best Actress – Film	Gyeongju	Nominated	
Baeksang Arts Awards	2015	InStyle Fashionista Award	—N/a	Won	
Beautiful Artist Awards (Note: Shin Young-kyun Arts and Culture Foundation))	2024	Good People Artist Award	—N/a	Won	
Blue Dragon Film Awards	2021	Best Leading Actress	Diva	Nominated	
Blue Dragon Film Awards	2026	Best Actress	The Eyes	Pending	
Chunsa Film Art Awards	2009	Best Actress	Go Go 70s	Won	
Cosmo Beauty Awards	2011	Beauty Icon of the Year	—N/a	Won	
Dior Timeless Beauty Award	2006	Recipient	—N/a	Won	
KBS Drama Awards	2005	Best New Actress	A Love to Kill	Nominated	
KBS Drama Awards	2007	Excellence Award, Actress in a Miniseries	Lucifer	Nominated	
KBS Drama Awards	2015	Top Excellence Award, Actress	Oh My Venus	Nominated	
KBS Drama Awards	2015	Excellence Award, Actress in a Miniseries	Oh My Venus	Won	
KBS Drama Awards	2015	Best Couple with So Ji-sub	Oh My Venus	Won	
Korean Advertisers Association Awards	2010	Good Model Award	—N/a	Won	
Korean Film Awards	2008	Best Supporting Actress	Go Go 70s	Nominated	
Max Movie Awards	2009	Best Actress	Go Go 70s	Won	
MBC Drama Awards	2012	Top Excellence Award, Actress in a Miniseries	Arang and the Magistrate	Nominated	
MBC Drama Awards	2012	Best Couple with Lee Joon-gi	Arang and the Magistrate	Won	
Mnet 20's Choice Awards	2009	Hot Fashionista	—N/a	Won	
SBS Drama Awards	2003	New Star Award	Punch	Won	
SBS Drama Awards	2010	Excellence Award, Actress in a Drama Special	My Girlfriend Is a Gumiho	Won	
SBS Drama Awards	2010	Best Couple with Lee Seung-gi	My Girlfriend Is a Gumiho	Won	
SBS Drama Awards	2010	Top 10 Stars	My Girlfriend Is a Gumiho	Won	
Seoul International Drama Awards	2016	Outstanding Korean Actress	Oh My Venus	Won	
Style Icon Awards	2009	Female Fashionista	—N/a	Won	
Style Icon Awards	2010	Style Icon Actress, TV category	My Girlfriend Is a Gumiho	Won	
TVCF Awards	2010	Best CF Model	—N/a	Won	
University Film Festival of Korea	2008	Best Supporting Actress	Go Go 70s	Won	
Wildflower Film Awards	2015	Best Actress	Gyeongju	Nominated	
Wildflower Film Awards	2015	Special Jury Prize	Gyeongju	Won	

=== State honors ===
Name of country, year given, and name of honor
Country	Organization	Year	Honor or Award	Ref.
South Korea	Financial Services Commission (Note: Honors are given at the Finance Day ceremony.)	2019	Presidential Citation	
South Korea	National Tax Service (Note: Honors are given at the Taxpayers' Day ceremony.)	2011	Presidential Commendation	

=== Listicles ===
Name of publisher, year listed, name of listicle, and placement
Publisher	Year	Listicle	Placement	Ref.
Forbes	2010	Korea Power Celebrity 40	28th	
Forbes	2011	Korea Power Celebrity 40	15th	
Forbes	2012	Korea Power Celebrity 40	31st	
Gallup Korea	2021	Gallup Korea's Actor of the Year	2nd	
Gallup Korea	2022	Gallup Korea's Actor of the Year	12th (Note: Shin Min-a mentioned together with Song Hye-kyo and Son Ye-jin with 2.2% of Gallup survey respondent)	
Joy News 24 (Note: Joy News 24, an entertainment economic magazine, conducted a survey from October 12 to 19, 2021, about dramas, movies, actors, singers, and entertainment programs that shone in 2021 in celebration of its 17th anniversary. About 200 people in the industry participated in the survey, including executives at entertainment companies and broadcasting companies, producers of film and broadcast content, and reporters from the entertainment department. The results of the survey are presented by category.)	2022	Best Actor of the Year	6th (Note: 3 votes each, tied with Go Doo-shim, Kim Hye-ja and Lee Jung-eun)	
