= Oh Ha-nee =

South Korean actress (born 1990)

- Born: 26 March 1990 (age 36); Chungcheong Province, South Korea
- Other name: Oh Ha-nui
- Occupation: Actress
- Years active: 2013–present
- Agent: C-JeS Entertainment
- Known for: Tempted; The Crowned Clown; Three Bold Siblings

Oh Ha-nee (Korean: 오하니) is a South Korean actress. She is known for her roles in dramas such as Goodbye to Goodbye, Tempted, The Crowned Clown and Three Bold Siblings. She also appeared in movies The Shameless, A Special Lady, Diva and The Age of Shadows.

== Filmography ==
=== Web series ===
Year	Title	Role	Ref.
2024	Queen Woo	Sa-bi	

=== Television series ===
Year	Title	Role	Ref.
2013	A Hundred Year Legacy	Ha-nee	
2015	Mask	Club woman	
2016	Weightlifting Fairy Kim Bok-joo	Rhythmic gymnast	
2018	Tempted	Park Hye-jung	
2018	Goodbye to Goodbye	Lee Ah-in	
2019	The Crowned Clown	Ae-young	
2019	Melting Me Softly	Park Kyung-ja	
2019	The Tale of Nokdu	Queen Inmok	
2020	Mystic Pop-up Bar	Yu-mi	
2022	Three Bold Siblings	Min Yu-ri	
2022	Connect	Song Ha-young	
2023	Andante of Love	Kim Joo-hee	
2023	The Good Bad Mother	Seon-yung	
2023	The Killing Vote	Kang Yoon-ji	
2023	Perfect Marriage Revenge	Seo Do-na	

=== Film ===
Year	Title	Role	Ref.
2015	C'est si bon	High school girl	
2015	Empire of Lust	Chwihangru gisaeng	
2015	Twenty	Make-up team	
2015	The Shameless	Son Min-ji	
2016	Love, Lies	Gyeongseong club employee	
2016	The Age of Shadows	Hwang Seo-im	
2017	Eve	Eve	
2017	A Special Lady	Wei	
2018	Fantastic Vacation White Paper: The Road to Samcheonpo	So-young	
2018	Marionette	Yang Se-jeong	
2019	Rosebud	Mi-ran	
2019	Between The Seasons	Ji-eun	
2020	Diva	Kang Cho-ah	
2021	The ABCs of Our Relationship	Choi Han-na	

== Awards and nominations ==
Name of the award ceremony, year presented, category, nominee of the award, and the result of the nomination
Award ceremony	Year	Category	Nominee / Work	Result	Ref.
1st New Film Arts Film Festival	2017	Rookie of the Year Award	Eve	Won	
21st Philadelphia Film Festival Best Actress Award	2018	Best Actress Award	Eve	Won	
