= Oh My Venus =

2015 South Korean TV series

- Promotional poster
- Genre: Romance; Drama; Comedy; Fitness
- Written by: Kim Eun-ji
- Directed by: Kim Hyung-suk; Lee Na-jeong
- Starring: So Ji-sub; Shin Min-a
- Opening theme: Beautiful Lady by Kim Jong-hyun
- Ending theme: Beautiful Lady by Kim Jong-hyun
- Country of origin: South Korea
- Original language: Korean
- No. of episodes: 16

Production
- Executive producer: Jung Hae-ryong
- Producers: Kim Sung-yoon; Yoon Jae-hyuk
- Production companies: Mong-jak-so Company, ONDA Entertainment; KBS Media

Original release
- Network: KBS2
- Release: November 16, 2015 – January 5, 2016

Oh My Venus (Korean: 오 마이 비너스) is a South Korean television series starring So Ji-sub and Shin Min-a. It aired on KBS2 on Mondays and Tuesdays at 21:55 (KST) for 16 episodes beginning on November 16, 2015.

== Plot ==
Kim Young-ho, a.k.a. John Kim, is a personal trainer to Hollywood stars. Despite his family's wealth, Young-ho suffered a devastating illness in his childhood. But he believes living a healthy lifestyle and exercise is the only way to survive. He uses this to run from his family issues. His fear of his father and pity for his grandmother. A Hollywood scandal with an actress has him on the run back to Korea.

Kang Joo-eun was once an ulzzang in her teens, semi-famous for her pretty face and enviable figure. Now a 33-year-old lawyer, she has gained a lot of weight since. She passes out on a flight from the U.S. back to Korea and John Kim is the only medical personnel on the flight who takes charge. He watches out for her even after they arrive home. After getting dumped by her boyfriend, Im Woo-shik, she finds that she has the press pass for John Kim and proceeds to (blackmail) convince him to help her lose the weight.

She discovers that Young-ho has a weakness for being a knight in shining armor. She moves in with him, Ji-woong and Joon-sung (Korean Snake), after a stalking incident and also her brother needing money for marriage anyway caused her to sell her apartment. As they work on her physical transformation, both discover they feel more for each other than what they will admit. As they grow closer they heal each other's emotional wounds and eventually falling in love before a tragedy befalls Kim Young-ho leaving his fate uncertain.

In a flashback scene, it's revealed that Kang Joo-eun met Kim Young-ho when he was dealing with bone cancer when he was a child and placed a plaster on his cast.

== Cast ==
- So Ji-sub as Kim Young-ho/John Kim

Young-ho is a personal trainer of Hollywood stars in America where he uses the alias John Kim. After a Hollywood scandal with a famous actress puts the spotlight on him, Young-ho returns to Korea to wait for the scandal to die down. On the plane back to Korea, Young-ho saves Kang Joo-eun after she suddenly collapses. A series of events bring the two together on several occasions with Young-ho saving Joo-eun from pitiful situations several times. Things become further complicated when he is prevented from returning to America by his grandmother, the CEO of his family's company, who hopes Young-ho will one day become her successor. Despite his personal and family issues, Young-ho has a kind heart and tries to help others.

- Shin Min-a as Kang Joo-eun

Kang Joo-eun is a 33 year-old lawyer and formerly called the "Venus of Daegu" in her hometown. After finishing high school and fulfilling her dream of becoming a lawyer, Joo-eun gains weight and feels she is no longer beautiful. After being dumped by her long term boyfriend on their 15-year anniversary, Joo-eun takes an overseas trip to America for work. On the ride back to Korea she faints after too much alcohol, medication and a corset puts her into respiratory distress. Young-ho saves her and they meet several more times, often with Joo-eun in an embarrassing situation. After finding out the identity of Young-ho as John Kim, she asks him to help her lose weight in return for not telling anybody about his dual identity. She is a blunt and hard-working person.

- Jung Gyu-woon as Im Woo-shik

Im Woo-shik is a former national swimmer. After meeting her while she was still in high school, Woo-shik falls in love with Joo-eun and she becomes his long-time girlfriend. Despite claiming she is his first love, Woo-shik begins to lose interest in Joo-eun and secretly goes out with Oh Soo-jin, Joo-eun's former best friend. Eventually Woo-shik officially breaks up with Joo-eun. Despite the change in their relationship, he continues to worry about Joo-eun and keeps watch over her. He is curious about the relationship between Kim Young-ho and Joo-eun.

- Yoo In-young as Oh Soo-jin

As an overweight girl in school, Soo-jin was very self-conscious and was lonely until Joo-eun befriended her. Now a successful lawyer, Soo-jin has shed the weight and has the body of a super model. She takes a job at the same company as Joo-eun as her superior and dates Woo-shik to exact revenge on Joo-eun, who she had always been jealous of because of her good looks.

- Sung Hoon as Jang Joon-sung

He is a professional MMA fighter trained by John Kim, his alias is "Korean Snake". He used to be an orphan but John Kim gladly took him as his student and trained him to become a successful MMA fighter.

- Henry Lau as Kim Ji-woong

Ji-woong is naturally the mood-maker, a goofy and nice person. He works as Joon-sung's manager.

- Jung Hye-sung as Jang Yi-jin

Jang Yi-jin is a CF Queen of South Korea, also a girl with full of aegyeo (mean "acting cute" in Korea). After she confesses to Joon-sung saying that she is a big fan of him, she always follows him around and is obsessed with him. Despite her career in the entertainment industry, she is a daughter of a rich CEO.

- Jin Kyung as Choi Hye-ran

Hye-ran is the second wife of Young-ho's father, Kim Sung-chul, who married him after Young-ho's mother died. Hye-ran has a son and wants him to get attention from Young-ho's family but he is not treated as an equal because he has no blood relation to them (Young-ho's father is the son-in-law of Young-ho's grandmother thus he is not a Gahong bloodline).

- Jo Eun-ji as Lee Hyun-woo

Hyun-woo is Joo-eun's friend and a single-mother. She works as a chef in a restaurant and is a loyal friend to Joo-eun. She has a strong bond with Joo-eun and they act almost like sisters. She is also close to Joo-eun's younger brother.

- Choi Jin-ho as Min Byung-wook

Byung-wook is a trust-worthy secretary for Young-ho's family and also a private secretary, he is a person whom Young-ho can depend on and trust. He is also concerned about Young-ho and helps him out.

- Nam Gi-ae as Je Soon-ja

The mother of Jang Joon-sung.

- Lee Seung-ho as Kim Yeong-joon
- Go Geon-han as Mr. Byeong

== Production ==
Shin underwent heavy make-up and costuming for her role as the overweight Kang Joo-eun. Before each filming session, Shin underwent three hours of make-up that included attaching a silicone mask formed from a mold of her face. A fat suit and padded clothing were also used to create the appearance of a heavy 30-something.

== Original soundtrack ==
Oh My Venus OST

Soundtrack album by Various artists
- Recorded: 2015
- Genre: Soundtrack
- Languages: Korean; English
- Label: CJ E&M

=== Part 1 ===
Released on November 17, 2015
No.	Title	Artist	Length
1.	"Beautiful Lady"	Kim Jong-hyun	3:17
2.	"Beautiful Lady" (Inst.)		3:17
Total length:			6:34

=== Part 2 ===
Released on November 23, 2015
No.	Title	Artist	Length
1.	"Darling U"	Kim Tae-woo (ft.Ben)	3:11
2.	"Darling U" (Inst.)		3:11
Total length:			6:22

=== Part 3 ===
Released on December 1, 2015
No.	Title	Artist	Length
1.	"That Person (Duet ver.)" (그런사람)	Lyn (ft.Shin Yong-jae)	4:04
2.	"That Person (Duet ver.)" (Inst.)		4:04
Total length:			8:08

=== Part 4 ===
Released on December 8, 2015
No.	Title	Artist	Length
1.	"It's me"	MIIII	3:27
2.	"It's me" (Inst.)		3:27
Total length:			6:54

=== Part 5 ===
Released on December 14, 2015
No.	Title	Artist	Length
1.	"I'll be there" (내가 있을게)	Tei	4:05
2.	"I'll be there" (Inst.)		4:05
Total length:			8:10

=== Part 6 ===
Released on December 21, 2015
No.	Title	Artist	Length
1.	"That Person (Man ver.)" (그런사람)	Shin Yong-jae (4Men)	4:04
2.	"That Person (Man ver.)" (Inst.)		4:04
3.	"Love moves on" (사랑은 그렇게)	Kei	4:12
4.	"Love moves on" (Inst.)		4:12
Total length:			16:32

=== Part 7 ===
Released on December 28, 2015
No.	Title	Artist	Length
1.	"That Person (Woman ver.)" (그런사람)	Lyn	3:57
2.	"That Person (Woman ver.)" (Inst.)		3:57
Total length:			7:14

=== Part 8 ===
Released on January 5, 2015
No.	Title	Artist	Length
1.	"Oh my venus" (오마이비너스)	Snuper	3:11
2.	"Oh my venus" (Inst.)		3:11
Total length:			6:22

== Ratings ==
In this table, the blue numbers represent the lowest ratings and the red numbers represent the highest ratings.

Ep.	Original broadcast date	Average audience share			
Ep.	Original broadcast date	TNmS		AGB Nielsen	
Ep.	Original broadcast date	Nationwide	Seoul	Nationwide	Seoul
1	November 16, 2015	7.4%	8.6%	7.4%	8.1%
2	November 17, 2015	7.0%	8.7%	8.2%	9.3%
3	November 23, 2015	7.4%	8.7%	8.4%	9.5%
4	November 24, 2015	8.1%	9.9%	9.4%	10.5%
5	November 30, 2015	7.1%	7.7%	8.8%	9.5%
6	December 1, 2015	7.9%	8.8%	9.7%	10.7%
7	December 7, 2015	6.6%	7.4%	8.2%	8.8%
8	December 8, 2015	7.0%	8.5%	9.4%	10.2%
9	December 14, 2015	7.2%	8.4%	8.7%	9.5%
10	December 15, 2015	7.4%	7.8%	8.9%	9.8%
11	December 21, 2015	6.5%	7.2%	8.4%	9.1%
12	December 22, 2015	6.7%	8.0%	8.6%	9.5%
13	December 28, 2015	6.7%	7.4%	8.7%	8.8%
14	December 29, 2015	7.5%	8.5%	9.9%	10.9%
15	January 4, 2016	6.7%	7.2%	8.4%	8.9%
16	January 5, 2016	7.5%	7.4%	8.7%	9.0%
Average		7.2%	8.1%	8.7%	9.5%

== Awards and nominations ==
Year	Award	Category	Recipient	Result
2015	KBS Drama Awards	Top Excellence Award, Actor	So Ji-sub	Won
2015	KBS Drama Awards	Top Excellence Award, Actress	Shin Min-ah	Nominated
2015	KBS Drama Awards	Excellence Award, Actor in a Miniseries	So Ji-sub	Nominated
2015	KBS Drama Awards	Excellence Award, Actress in a Miniseries	Shin Min-ah	Won
2015	KBS Drama Awards	Best Couple Award	So Ji-sub & Shin Min-a	Won
2016	9th Korea Drama Awards	Best Actor, Top Excellence Award	So Ji-sub	Nominated
2016	11th Seoul International Drama Awards	Outstanding Korean Actress	Shin Min-a	Won
