= A Special Lady =

2017 film by Lee An-gyu

- Theatrical release poster
- Hangul: 미옥
- RR: Miok
- MR: Miok
- Directed by: Lee An-gyu
- Written by: Lee An-gyu
- Screenplay by: Lee An-gyu; Jeong Seo-kyeong
- Produced by: Kim Mi-hwa
- Starring: Kim Hye-soo; Lee Sun-kyun; Lee Hee-joon
- Cinematography: Kim Tae-kyung
- Edited by: Shin Min-Kyung
- Production company: Kidari Entertainment
- Distributed by: Kidari Entertainment
- Release dates: October 12, 2017 (Sitges Film Festival); November 9, 2017 (South Korea)
- Running time: 91 minutes
- Country: South Korea
- Language: Korean
- Box office: US$1.7 million

A Special Lady (Korean: 미옥) is a 2017 South Korean crime action film directed by Lee An-gyu, starring Kim Hye-soo, Lee Sun-kyun and Lee Hee-joon.

== Plot ==
The story concerns a woman who becomes the second-in-command of a gangster organization-turned-leading business entity, fighting against the ruthless world of man's society, to protect her only son.

== Cast ==
- Kim Hye-soo as Na Hyun-jung
- Lee Sun-kyun as Im Sang-hoon
- Lee Hee-joon as Choi Dae-sik
- Choi Moo-sung as Chairman Kim
- Kim Min-seok as Joo-hwan
- Oh Ha-nee as Wei
- Han So-young as Kim Yeo-sa
- Cha Soon-bae as President Jang
- Guk Joong-woong as President Kim
- Kwon Yul as Gong-myeong (Cameo)

== Production ==
Filming began on January 28, 2016, and ended on April 28, 2016.

The film's early working title was Precious Woman (Korean: 소중한 여인).

== Awards and nominations ==
Year	Award	Category	Recipient	Result	Ref.
2017	50th Sitges International Fantastic Film Festival	Focus Asia Award	A Special Lady	Won	
