= Lee Yoo-young =

South Korean actress (born 1989)

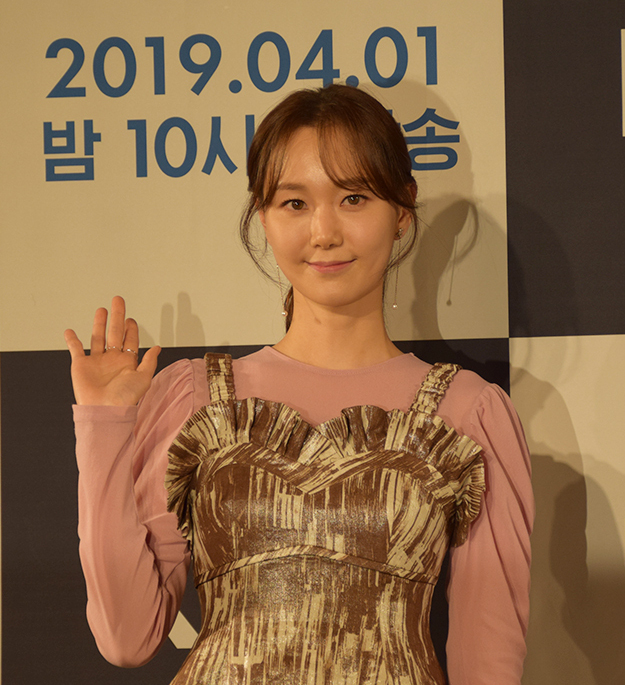
- Lee in 2019
- Born: December 8, 1989 (age 36); Seoul, South Korea
- Education: Korea National University of Arts (Department of Acting)
- Occupation: Actress
- Years active: 2012–present
- Agent: Ace Factory
- Spouse: Unknown (m. 2024)
- Children: 2

Korean name
- Hangul: 이유영
- RR: I Yuyeong
- MR: I Yuyŏng

Lee Yoo-young (Korean: 이유영; born December 8, 1989) is a South Korean actress. She made her debut in the film Late Spring (2014) which earned her a Best Actress award at the 14th Milan Film Festival. She subsequently starred in the television series The Lies Within (2018), Insider (2022) and Dare to Love Me (2024).

== Early life and education ==
Lee was born in Nowon District, Seoul, South Korea on December 8, 1989. During her childhood, she reportedly experienced significant social anxiety and interpersonal difficulties, including ostracism by peers. She underwent a personality shift during her high school years as a result of deliberate efforts to improve her social interactions. Due to strict parental supervision and limited financial support, Lee began working various part-time positions upon reaching the age of 20 to achieve financial independence, including a role as a hairdresser's assistant.

Following multiple scouting offers from casting agents, Lee began pursuing an acting career in 2010. She enrolled in the Department of Acting at the Korea National University of Arts. She was a part of the "Legendary Class of 2010," a cohort that included notable peers such as Kim Go-eun and Park So-dam. Actors who are from the same cohort include Ahn Eun-jin, Lee Sang-yi, Kim Sung-cheol, Cha Seo-won, and Lee Hwi-jong.

== Career ==
=== 2012–2014: Early works and critical breakthrough ===
Lee began her professional career in 2012 with the short film Flowers Do Not Wither..., followed by several additional short film appearances. In 2014, She made her feature film debut in Cho Geun-hyun's film Late Spring. Her portrayal of Min-kyung, a widow working as a nude model to support her two children, earned her the Best Actress award at the 14th Milan Film Festival, making her the first Korean actor to receive the honor.

Between 2014 and 2015, Lee appeared in various films, often portraying characters navigating traumatic circumstances, including roles in The Treacherous and The Accidental Detective. In the period thriller film The Treacherous, directed by Min Kyu-dong, Lee portrayed Seol Jung-mae, a character who competes with Dan-hee (played by Lim Ji-yeon) to win the affections of King Yeonsan. For her performance as Seol Jung-mae, she received the Rookie Actress Award at the 36th Blue Dragon Film Awards. In August 2015, Lee started filming Hong Sang-soo's film Yourself and Yours. She noted the difficulty of the role, citing the director's characteristic use of extensive dialogue. The film subsequently premiered at the 2016 Toronto International Film Festival.

=== 2015–2018: Expansion into television ===
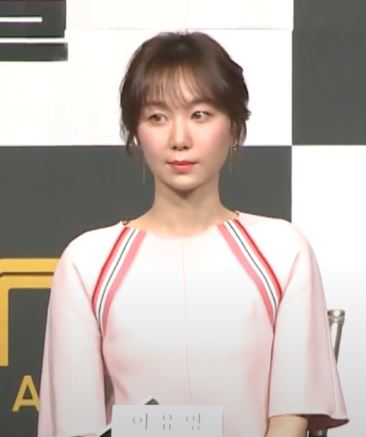
Lee in 2017

Lee transitioned to television in 2017 with the OCN series Tunnel (2017), playing Shin Jae-yi, a criminal psychologist characterized by emotional detachment resulting from past trauma. Despite being in her 30s, an age typically associated with bright and cheerful roles, Lee has chosen to take on more complex and challenging characters.

In 2018, she starred in the film Marionette as Seorin, a victim of a sexual crime whose past resurfaces after she becomes a high school teacher. A text message from an unidentified being called 'Master' creates a crack in her new life. That same year, she portrayed Han Eun-sung, a French interpreter in the drama special You Drive Me Crazy, opposite Kim Seon-ho. The four-episode drama was aired on MBC from May 7–8, 2018. Also in 2018, Lee portrayed Song So-eun in the SBS drama Your Honor. The series follows Han Kang-ho (Yoon Si-yoon), a former criminal who becomes a judge in his brother's absence. Lee's character, Song So-eun, is a student at the Judicial Research and Training Institute with aspirations of becoming a prosecutor. Her performance earned her the Best New Actress Award at the 2018 SBS Drama Awards.

In 2020, Lee participated in SF8, a science-fiction anthology project produced by MBC in collaboration with the Directors Guild of Korea and Wavve. It consisted of 8 short films with eight directors. She acted opposite Ye Soo-jung in the segment "Nursing," directed by Min Gyu-dong. Subsequently, she appeared in the romantic comedy Traces of Love as Joo-young, a character navigating a professional and personal reunion with a former boyfriend (played by Lee Sang-yeob). Directed Yoo Young-eun, the project received critical notice for its gender-sensitive approach to its narrative.

In September 2020, Lee appeared in Jo Seul-ye's directorial debut Diva, starring alongside Shin Min-a and Lee Kyu-hyung. The film focuses on the relationship between two competitive divers and friends, Lee Young (Shin) and Soo-jin (Lee). Following a vehicular accident that results in Soo-jin's disappearance, the narrative follows Lee Young's psychological struggle and her confrontation with personal fears and ambitions.

=== 2020–present: Streaming project and recent roles ===
In 2021, Lee appeared in the Apple TV+ original series Dr. Brain, marking the platform's first Korean-language production. Directed by Kim Jee-woon and based on a webtoon of the same name, the science-fiction thriller featured Lee as the wife of a neuroscientist.

Lee subsequently starred as Young-mi in Im Sun-ae's 2023 feature film Ms. Apocalypse. Set in 1999, the narrative depicts a woman who serves a prison sentence after taking the blame for an embezzlement committed by her romantic interest. The film received positive reviews at prestigious film festivals, including the 27th Fantasia Film Festival Schwarzenegger Competition, the 28th Busan International Film Festival Korea's Today-Panorama, and the 49th Seoul Independent Film Festival Festival Choice.

In 2024, Lee starred in KBS2's romance drama Dare to Love Me, based on the Naver Webtoon by Sun Woo. The series follows the story of a scholar Shin Yun-bok (played by Kim Myung-soo) and Kim Hong-do (lee) a woman tired of mistreatment. It aired from May 13 to July 2, 2024, and is available for streaming on Netflix and Viki in certain regions.

== Other activities ==
=== Endorsements ===
After winning Best Actress at the 14th Milan Film Festival, Lee was chosen as model for the matchmaking agency Duo with Yoon Tae-woong. She also chosen as the model for Bacchus, a fatigue recovery supplement advertisement. In 2018, Lee was chosen as muse for fashion brand Deco & I. In 2019, Lee has been selected as the advertising model for beauty care medical device Newa. Lee also served as model for INKO, a premium heated brand of Jibon Cosmetics.

=== Philanthropy ===
In July 2024, it was reported that Lee donated ₩65 million to the Gwangju Community Chest of Korea on July 28 to support aging out youth. (Note: Aging-out youth (aged-out orphan) is an orphan who reach the age of 18 years old and must leave the orphanage or foster care system to live independently.)

== Personal life ==
=== Relationships ===
In December 2016, Lee was confirmed to be dating her Yourself and Yours co-star, Kim Joo-hyuk. Their relationship continued until Kim's death on October 30, 2017, in a traffic collision.

On February 6, 2023, it was confirmed that Lee was dating a non-celebrity boyfriend. In July 2024, reports said Lee had privately registered her marriage in May and was expecting a child. She subsequently gave birth to a daughter in August, with the news announced on September 4. She and her husband held their official wedding reception on September 21, 2025 in Seoul. On April 6, 2026, Lee’s agency, Ace Factory, revealed that she was pregnant with her second child, stating that she was expected to deliver in September. Lee gave birth to a second daughter in early September of 2026.

== Filmography ==
=== Film ===
Year	Title	Role	Notes	Ref.
2012	A Flowers Does Not Wilt, But...	Soo-young	Short film	
2013	Men		Short film	
2013	Hide and Seek	Cafe part-timer	Bit part	
2014	The Lunch Date		Short film	
2014	Late Spring	Lee Min-kyung		
2015	The Treacherous	Seoljungmae		
2015	Fatal Intuition	Si-eun		
2015	A Lonely Bird		Short film	
2016	Mr. Cowper	In-ae	Short film	
2016	Yourself and Yours	Min-jeong		
2018	Marionette	Han Seo-rin		
2018	Grass		Special appearance	
2018	Herstory	Ryu Seon-yeong	Special appearance	
2018	The Soul-Mate	Hyeon-ji		
2019	I Am Home	Eun-seo		
2020	Diva	Soo-jin		
2021	Perhaps Love	Jeong-won (Hyun's neighbor)		
2024	Ms. Apocalypse	Kim Young-mi		
2024	The Firefighters	Seo-hee		

=== Television series ===
Year	Title	Role	Notes	Ref.
2016	Clocking Out	Mae-goo	Special appearance	
2017	Tunnel	Shin Jae-yi / Park Yeon-ho		
2018	You Drive Me Crazy	Han Eun-sung		
2018	Your Honor	Song So-eun		
2019	My Fellow Citizens!	Kim Mi-young		
2019	The Lies Within	Kim Seo-hee		
2020	SF8	Gan Ho-jung / Yeon Jung-in	Episode: "The Prayer"	
2020	Drama Special	Lee Joo-young	Episode: "Traces of Love"	
2022	Insider	Oh Soo-yeon		
2024	Dare to Love Me	Kim Hong-do		
2025	Pro Bono	Oh Jung-in		

=== Web series ===
Year	Title	Role	Notes	Ref.
2021	Dr. Brain	Jung Jae-yi	Season 1	

=== Television show ===
Year	Title	Role	Ref.
2022	Besties in Wonderland	Cast Member	

== Awards and nominations ==
Name of the award ceremony, year presented, category, nominee of the award, and the result of the nomination
Award ceremony	Year	Category	Nominee / Work	Result	Ref.
APAN Star Awards	2018	Best New Actress	Your Honor	Nominated	
Blue Dragon Film Awards	2015	Best New Actress	The Treacherous	Won	
Buil Film Awards	2015	Best New Actress	Late Spring	Won	
Chunsa Film Art Awards	2015	Best New Actress	The Treacherous	Nominated	
Grand Bell Awards	2015	Best New Actress	Late Spring	Won	
KBS Drama Awards	2019	Best New Actress	My Fellow Citizens!	Nominated	
KBS Drama Awards	2019	Excellence Award, Actress in a Mid-length Drama	My Fellow Citizens!	Nominated	
KBS Drama Awards	2020	Best Actress in a One-Act/Special/Short Drama	Traces of Love	Won	
KOFRA Film Awards	2015	Best New Actress	Late Spring	Won	
Korea Drama Awards	2019	Excellence Award, Actress	My Fellow Citizens!	Nominated	
Korea Film Actors Association Awards	2015	Popular Movie Star	The Treacherous	Won	
Korean Association of Film Critics Awards	2015	Best New Actress	Late Spring	Nominated	
Max Movie Awards	2016	Best New Actress	The Treacherous	Nominated	
Milano Film Festival	2014	Best Actress	Late Spring	Won	
SBS Drama Awards	2018	Best New Actress	Your Honor	Won	
SBS Drama Awards	2018	Excellence Award, Actress in a Wednesday-Thursday Drama	Your Honor	Nominated	
The Seoul Awards	2018	Best New Actress	Your Honor	Nominated	
Wildflower Film Awards	2015	Best New Actress	Late Spring	Nominated	
Wildflower Film Awards	2017	Best Actress	Yourself and Yours	Nominated	
Wildflower Film Awards	2020	Best Actress	I Am Home	Nominated	
