= Lee Hwi-jong =

South Korean actor (born 1991)

- Born: May 15, 1991 (age 35); South Korea
- Education: Korea National University of Arts (Department of Theatre)
- Occupation: Actor
- Years active: 2014–present
- Agent: C-Trio Entertainment

Korean name
- Hangul: 이휘종
- Hanja: 李煇鐘
- RR: I Hwijong
- MR: I Hwijong

Lee Hwi-jong (Korean: 이휘종; born May 15, 1991) is a South Korean actor. He is mostly active in theater plays and musicals, but he also does independent film. He is known for his supporting roles in the dramas Law School, Goodbye Earth and the film The Girl on a Bulldozer.

== Early life ==
When Lee Hwi-jong was young, he was quite introverted and fell in love with gaming, considering becoming a professional gamer. However, his mother, who was involved in theater at school, encouraged him to try acting. At first, Lee felt very uncomfortable standing in front of people and even just saying one line would make his face turn red. Despite this initial discomfort, Lee gradually became more aware of the appeal of acting. He attended the Korea National University of Arts Preparatory School and then entered a theater academy, steadily working towards becoming an actor.

Lee was a part of the Class of 2010 in the Department of Theater and Film at Korea National University of Arts, along with classmates Kim Go-eun, Lee Yoo-young, Park So-dam, Ahn Eun-jin, Lee Sang-yi, Kim Sung-cheol, and Cha Seo-won.

== Career ==
Lee primarily focused on independent films while studying at Korea National University of Arts. Starting from his second year, he also had the opportunity to work on commercial films. However, balancing outside activities with a packed class schedule from 8 a.m. to 4-5 p.m. was challenging. He graduated early with a Bachelor of Arts degree, determined to continue making films, both short and after graduation.

Lee made his debut in Daehakro in 2015 with the play Sewol Ferry: Room in the Air. After graduating in 2016, by chance, he auditioned for the play "History Boys" and made his professional stage debut in the role of Acta.

In December 2016, Lee attended his film press conference alongside Lee Jun-sang, Park Jeong-geun, Kwon Ki-ha, Park Myung-shin, Go Won-hee, and Jeong Ji-sun. On January 5, 2017, the queer independent film 'Don't Worry' released in theater. It is an omnibus work consisting of three films, 'A Yearning Heart' (director So Joon-moon), 'Little Finger' (director Kim Hyun and Kim Dae-gyeon), and 'Sowol-gil' (director Shin Jong-hoon).

He was also cast as Myeong-gu in play Voice of the Millennium.

In 2017, Lee was cast in musical History of Fools. It was performed at the Suhyeon Theater at DCF Daemyung Culture Factory in Daehakro from June 3 to August 27.

In 2018, Lee played the role of the illegitimate son Smerdyakov in musical Brother Kamazarov, who realizes true evil through his own death, alongside Park Jun-hwi in a double cast.

In the same year, Lee portrayed Stone, a helper robot, in the musical "Thank You Berry Strawberry," which ran at Daehakro Art One Theater Hall 2 until October 28.

In 2018, Lee was triple-cast with Oh Jong-hyuk and Ki Se-joong in the role of Arthur, a vampire who dreams of the day he can fly. The performance ran from November 30, 2018, to February 10, 2019, at Chungmu Arts Center's Black Theater.

In 2019, Lee were double cast with Yang Hee-jun to play the role of Dan, a character who lives in style and style while reciting Sijo in musical Swag Age: Shout, Joseon!. It performed at Doosan Art Center Yeongang Hall from June 18 to August 25. He reprised his role in encore performance at Daehakro Hongik University Art Center Grand Theater from February 14 to April 26, 2020. He won New Actor award in 3rd Korea Musical Awards and win with other cast ensemble award in 8th Yegreen Musical Award.

In 2020, Lee joined two-hander play Mouthpiece. Lee and Jang Ryul were double in the role of Declan, who is unable to develop his artistic talent while being neglected by his parents and society's indifference. It was performed at Art One Theater Hall 2 from July 11 to September 6.

In 2021, The play The Glass Menagerie performed at Daehakro Art One Theater Hall 2 from April 6 to May 30. Lee and Hong Joon-ki were named for the role of Tom, a young man who dreams of becoming a poet but struggles in reality.

In 2022, Lee participated in the third installment of The 9th Best Plays Festival, (Note: The Best Play Festival or Theater Heated Battle (연극열전) is a biennial theater festival hosted by The Best Plays Inc. The establishment of The Best Plays Inc. in 2007 was a result of the resounding success of The 1st Best Plays Festival in 2004. The festival, originally initiated by Dongsoong Art Center Theatre Company, signaled a paradigm shift for Korean theater by showcasing young directors and popular stars. The festival's goals include producing outstanding Korean plays as part of our repertoire, supporting new plays and playwrights, and introducing remarkable plays from around the world with the purpose of motivating and enriching the Korean theater industry.) Touching the Void by David Greig. It is based on the true story of the survival of two British mountain climbers, Joe Simpson and Simon Yates. Shin was triple casts with Kim Seon-ho and Shin Sung-min for the role of Joe Simpson. The Korean premiere, directed by Kim Dong-yeon, was performed at Art One Theater 2 in Daehangno from July 8 to September 18, 2022.

Start Production second creative musical 'Youth Noise' met the audience with its premiere stage at the Cotton Hall of Dongduk Women's University in Daehakro from January 1, 2023. Youth Noise. Lee, Kim Yi-dam, Jeong Wook-jin, and Kim Min-seong were cast in the role of Oh Young-won, a popular online travel writer who loves Pinocchio and dreams of traveling to Italy, but has never actually been on a trip.

Musical Wonder Boy, seasonal production of Sejong Center for the Performing Arts' Sync Next 22, was performed at the Sejong Center for the Performing Arts S Theater from Friday, August 19 to Saturday, August 27. Lee and Kim Beom-jun take turn perform the role of Wonder Boy, Jung Hoon, who gained superpowers after losing his father in an unexpected accident.

== Filmography ==
=== Film ===
Year	Title	Role	Notes	Ref.
2014	Cart		bit	
2016	Don't Worry segment: Sowol Road	son	Short, supporting role	
2016	Happy Papa's Birthday!		Short	
2016	Black Reporter	soldier	Main actor	
2019	Digressions	Huizong		
2020	Please Don't Save Me	Teacher	Main actor	
2021	I Risked Everything	Kim Jeong-hwan		
2022	The Girl on a Bulldozer	Eun-seok	supporting role	
2022	The Woman in the White Car	Yong-jae	supporting role	

=== Television series ===
Year	Title	Role	Ref.
2017	Someone who Might Know	Hwi-jong	
2018	The Hymn of Death	Hwi-jong	
2021	Law School	Ko Young-chang	
2023	King the Land	Photographer 2	
2023	Behind Your Touch	Yeom Jong-hyuk	

=== Web series ===
Year	Title	Role	Notes	Ref.
2024	Goodbye Earth	Jo In-tae	YouTuber 'Jade Rabbit'	

== Stage ==
=== Concert ===
Concert performances
Year	Title		Role	Theater	Date	Ref.
Year	English	Korean	Role	Theater	Date	Ref.
2016	Musical Talk Concert Housewarming - The Rest of the Class	뮤지컬 토크 콘서트 집들이 - 나머지 수업	Tae	TOM Theatre 2	May 30, 2016	
2019	Pop-up concert in TOM	팝업 콘서트 in TOM	Himself	Daehak-ro T.O.M. 1	January 16 to 22	
2019	Musical 'Swag Age: Shout, Joseon' mini concert	뮤지컬 '스웨그에이지: 외쳐, 조선' 미니콘서트	Dan	Doosan Art Center Yeongang Hall	June 18 to August 25	

=== Musical ===
Musical play performances
Year	Title		Role	Theater	Date	Ref.
Year	English	Korean	Role	Theater	Date	Ref.
2017	B Class	B클래스	Lee Hwan	Daehangno Freedom Theater	April 1 - May 28, 2017	
2017	The History of the Fool	찌질의 역사	Kwon Ki-hyuk	Yes24 Stage 3	June 3 - August 27, 2017	
2017	The Legend of the Little Basketball Team - Ansan	전설의 리틀 농구단 - 안산	Soo-hyun	Ansan Culture & Arts Center Dalmaji Theater	October 20–29, 2017	
2017	The Legend of the Little Basketball Team - Ansan	전설의 리틀 농구단 - 안산	Soo-hyun	Ansan Culture & Arts Center Byeolmuri Theater	November 21–25, 2017	
2018	The Brothers Karamazov	브라더스 까라마조프	Smerdyakov	Yes24 Stage 3	February 10 - April 15, 2018	
2018	Bungee Jumping Concert	번지점프를 하다 콘서트	Hyun Bin	Blue Square Chaos Hall	May 28, 2018	
2018	Bungee Jumping	번지점프를 하다	Hyun Bin	Sejong Center for the Performing Arts M Theater	June 12 - August 26, 2018	
2018	Thank You Very Strawberry	땡큐 베리 스트로베리	Stone	Art One Theater 2	August 16- October 28, 2018	
2018–2019	Vampire Arthur	뱀파이어 아더	Arthur	Chungmu Art Center Black Box	November 30, 2018 - February 10, 2019	
2019	Swag Age	스웨그에이지	Dan	Doosan Art Centre Yeongang Hall	June 18 - August 25, 2019	
2020	Swag Age	스웨그에이지	Dan	Hongik University Daehakro Arts Center Main Theater	February 14 - May 24, 2020	
2020	The Brothers Karamazov	브라더스 까라마조프	Smerdyakov	Daehakro Free Theater	February 7 - May 3, 2020	
2020	Swag Age - Daejeon	스웨그에이지 - 대전	Dan	Daejeon Yeonjeonggugakwon Keunmadang	December 24–27, 2020	
2022	Wonder Boy	원더보이	Jeong Hun	Sejong Center for the Performing Arts S Theater	August 19–27, 2022	
2023	Youth Noise	청춘소음	Oh Young-won	Dongduk Women's University Performing Arts Center Cotton Hall	January 1 - February 26, 2023	
2023	The Happy Prince	행복한 왕자	Wilde and others	Chungmu Art Center Black Box	April 29 - June 18, 2023	
2024	Kiki's Borderline Personality Disorder Diary	키키의 경계성 인격장애 다이어리	Kiki	CKL Stage	January 27 - February 25, 2024	

=== Theater ===
Theater play performances
Year	Title		Role	Theater	Date	Ref.
Year	English	Korean	Role	Theater	Date	Ref.
2015	Sewol - The Air of the Dead	세월호 - 공중의 방	Tae	Hyehwa-dong Theatre Research Institute	August 26–30, 2015	
2016	The History Boys	히스토리 보이즈	Acta	Baekam Art Hall	April 8 - May 8, 2016	
2016	Voice of Millennium	보이스 오브 밀레니엄	Myeong-gu	Dongsung Art Center Small Theater	November 5 to December 31, 2016	
2019	The History Boys	히스토리 보이즈	Posner	Doosan Art Centre Yeongang Hall	September 20 - October 27, 2019	
2020	The Best Play 8 - Mouthpiece	연극열전8 - 마우스피스	Declan	Art One Theater 2	July 11 - September 6, 2020	
2021	The Glass Menagerie	유리동물원	Tom	Art One Theater 2	April 6, 2021 - May 30, 2021	
2021–2022	Mouthpiece	마우스피스	Declan	Art One Theater 2	November 12, 2021 - January 30, 2022	
2022	The Best Play 9 — Touching the Void	연극열전9 - 터칭 더 보이드	Joe Simpson	Art One Theatre 2	July 8 to September 18, 2022	
2023	The Case of Wrong Growth	잘못된 성장의 사례	Human criminal	Doosan Art Center Space111	September 5 to 23	

== Awards and nominations ==
Name of the award ceremony, year presented, category, nominee of the award, work, and the result of the nomination
Award ceremony	Year	Category	Work	Result	Ref.
3th Korea Musical Awards	2019	New Actor Award	Swag Age	Won	
8th Yegreen Musical Awards	2019	Ensemble Award	Swag Age	Won (Note: Ensemble Award shared with all actors)	
