= Kim Young-sun (actress) =

South Korean television and film actress (born 1971)

- Born: March 5, 1971 (age 55); Dongnae District, Busan, South Korea
- Other name: Kim Yeong-seon
- Occupations: Actress; theater actor; musical director
- Years active: 2005–present
- Agent: Hunus Entertainment

Korean name
- Hangul: 김영선
- RR: Gim Yeongseon
- MR: Kim Yŏngsŏn

Kim Young-sun (Korean: 김영선; born 5 March 1971) is a South Korean actress. She made her acting debut in 2005 in films, since then, she has appeared in number of plays, films and television series. She got recognition for her supporting roles in Boys Over Flowers (2009), Shine or Go Crazy (2015), and Twenty-Five Twenty-One (2022). She has acted in films such as: The Piper (2015), A Man and a Woman (2016) and Psychokinesis (2018) among others.

== Career ==
Kim Young-sun is affiliated to artist management company Hunus Entertainment since February 2022.

It was her childhood dream to become an actor, so Kim acted in Busan Municipal Youth Theater since her middle school days. After graduation from school she worked in a bank. In beginning she was majorly active in the theater and stage but later on she appeared in TV series and films.

== Filmography ==
=== Films ===
Year	Title	Role	Notes	Ref.
2006	Hanbando			
2006	Bloody Reunion			
2007	Black House	Hong-yeon's mother		
2007	Wide Awake			
2007	The Happy Life			
2007	Our Town	Supermarket wife		
2008	The Chaser	Yeong-min's older sister		
2009	White Night	Female teacher		
2010	I Saw the Devil	Nun 1		
2010	Hello Ghost	Detective Noh's wife		
2010	Heartbeat	Cleaning lady		
2012	Dancing Queen	Jeong-min's mother, past		
2012	Nameless Gangster: Rules of the Time			
2013	No Breathing	Woo-sang's mother		
2013	My Dear Girl, Jin-young	Woman past her prime	Special appearance	
2013	Mansin: Ten Thousand Spirits	Kim Geum-hwa's mother		
2014	My Ordinary Love Story	Jeong Ma-dam		
2015	The Piper	Mudang		
2016	A Man and a Woman	Lady helper		
2017	The Seeds of Violence	Deaconess Yoon		
2018	Psychokinesis	Roo-mi's mom		
2018	Marionette	Han Soon-jung		
2018	Gate	Clinic Wife	Cameo	
2022	Table Manners	Ok-soon		

=== Television series ===
Year	Title	Role	Notes	Ref.
2005	Sassy Girl Chun-hyang			
2005	Be Strong, Geum-soon!	Dietician		
2005	My Lovely Sam Soon	Restaurant guest		
2007	Bad Woman, Good Woman	Yeon Byeon-daek		
2007	H.I.T	Lee Mi-ok		
2008-09	White Lie			
2009	Empress Cheonchu	Han In-kyung		
2009	Boys Over Flowers	Fishing village resident 3		
2009	My Too Perfect Sons	Sol pharmacy customer		
2009	Tamra, the Island	Yang-soon Eo-meong		
2010	OB & GY	Yang-soon Eo-meong		
2010	Dong Yi	Crowned princess		
2010	Prosecutor Princess	Choi In-sook		
2010	Giant	Yoon Ki-hoon's wife		
2010	Ugly Miss Young-ae	Director Yoo Hyeong-gwan's	Season 8	
2011	Sign	Jung Eun-mo		
2012	Golden Time	Detective's wife		
2012	Strangers 6			
2013	Two Weeks	Park Jae-kyeong's mother		
2013	Reply 1994	Rubbish's mom		
2014	Quiz of God	Oh Kyeong-sook	Season 4	
2014	Secret Door	Heung-bok's mother		
2015	Shine or Go Crazy	Yum Shil		
2015	Angry Mom	Mackerel mother		
2016	Come Back Mister	Gi-tak's mother		
2016	My Lawyer, Mr. Jo	Yeon-sook		
2017	Criminal Minds	Park Song-i's mother		
2017	Live Up to Your Name	Psychiatrist		
2017	Children of the 20th Century	Lee Gwang-hee		
2017	The Package	Han Doo-ri's mother		
2017	Black	Oh Man-soo's mother		
2018–19	My Strange Hero	Yeong-min's mother		
2019	Save Me 2	Village foreman's wife		
2020	Tale of the Nine Tailed	Shaman		
2021	Police University	Oh Jeong-ja		
2021	Check Out the Event	Hyeon Kyeong-mi		
2021	Squid Game	Gi-hun's friend's wife		
2022	Twenty-Five Twenty-One	Baek Yi-jin's mother		
2022	Unlock My Boss	Choi Soo-jin		

=== Theater ===
Year	Title	Role	Notes/Ref.
2009	Hair Salon Riot	Super auntie	

== Ambassadorship ==
- Public Relations Ambassador for the 2022 Seoul International Senior Film Festival held from May 19 to May 23 at CGV Piccadilly 1958 Hall 3.
