= Marionette (2017 film) =

2017 film by Lee Han-wook

- Theatrical poster
- Hangul: 나를 기억해
- Lit.: Remember Me
- RR: Nareul gieokhae
- MR: Narŭl kiŏkhae
- Directed by: Lee Han-wook
- Written by: Lee Han-wook
- Starring: Lee Yoo-young; Kim Hee-won; Kim Da-mi; Jang Hyuk-jin; Ko Kyu-pil; Kim Young-sun; Kang Ji-sub
- Edited by: Won Chang-jae
- Production company: Oasis ENT
- Distributed by: Kidari Ent
- Release dates: November 2017 (IFFI); April 19, 2018 (South Korea)
- Running time: 102 minutes
- Country: South Korea
- Language: Korean
- Box office: US$1.1 million

Marionette (Korean: 나를 기억해; RR: Nareul gieokhae; lit. 'Remember Me') is a 2017 South Korean crime thriller film written and directed by Lee Han-wook. The film stars Lee Yoo-young and Kim Hee-won.

== Cast ==
- Lee Yoo-young as Han Seo-rin / Min-ah

A high school teacher who is haunted by a violent man from her past.

- Kim Hee-won as Oh Kook-chul

A former detective who tracks down the mysterious criminal.

- Oh Ha-nee as Yang Se-jung
- Lee Hak-joo as Kim Dong-jin
- Kim Da-mi as Yoo Min-ah
- Lee Je-yeon as Kim Jin-ho
- Jang Hyuk-jin as Jo Young-jae
- Ko Kyu-pil as Detective Moon
- Kim Young-sun as Han Soon-jung
- Kang Ji-sub as Woo-hyuk

== Production ==
Marionette is Lee Han-wook's feature directorial debut. Lee previously directed the 2012 mid-length film Hide N Seek, which screened at the Montreal World Film Festival and the Boston International Film Festival.

The film began principal photography in December 2016.

== Release ==
Marionette had its world premiere at the 48th International Film Festival of India in November 2017, where it played in the International Competition section.

On March 12, 2018, the stars and director of Marionette attended a press conference in Seoul to promote the film.

Marionette was released in theaters on April 19, 2018.
