= The Eyes (2026 film) =

2026 film by Yeom Ji-ho

- Theatrical release poster
- Hangul: 눈동자
- RR: Nundongja
- MR: Nundongja
- Directed by: Yeom Ji-ho
- Screenplay by: Kim Ho-won
- Based on: Julia's Eyes by Guillem Morales
- Produced by: Kim Mi-hee; Choi Jong-hyun
- Starring: Shin Min-a; Kim Nam-hee
- Cinematography: Lee Tae-yoon
- Edited by: Jeong Byeong-jin
- Music by: Jeong Jung-han
- Production companies: Studio Dream Capture; Time Heist Pictures
- Distributed by: By4M Studio; LeeHwaBae Co. Inc.
- Release date: June 24, 2026
- Running time: 105 minutes
- Country: South Korea
- Language: Korean
- Box office: US$11.2 million

The Eyes (Korean: 눈동자) is a 2026 South Korean horror film directed by Yeom Ji-ho. A remake of the 2010 Spanish horror film Julia's Eyes, it follows a photographer (Shin Min-a) who investigates the suspicious death of her blind twin sister and becomes the next target of a killer. Distributed by By4M Studio and LeeHwaBae Co. Inc., the film was released in South Korea on June 24, 2026.

== Synopsis ==
Photographer Seo-jin is slowly losing her eyesight due to a hereditary eye disease. One day, she discovers the body of her twin sister Seo-in, who lost her vision before she did but went on to become a successful ceramic artist. Everyone believes it was suicide, but Seo-jin is convinced something isn't right. Strange, inexplicable works fill her sister's studio, and there was someone else there that day.

When no one believes her insistence that it wasn't suicide, Seo-jin begins investigating the truth herself. But as her vision continues to fade, she becomes the killer's next target. Detective Do-hyeok becomes Seo-jin's eyes as they unravel the mystery together. But the deeper they dig, the more the truth draws them into a web of confusion.

== Cast ==
- Shin Min-a as Seo-jin / Seo-in
- Kim Nam-hee as Do-hyeok
- Lee Seung-ryong as Hyeon-min
- Kim Young-ah as Mi-gyeong
- Kim Jun-bae as Gwang-cheol
- Son Bo-seung as Dae-ho

== Release ==
In October 2025, K-Movie Entertainment acquired the international sales rights to The Eyes and launched the film at the American Film Market (AFM).

The Eyes was released theatrically in South Korea on June 24, 2026 by By4M Studio and LeeHwaBae Co. Inc. It was released internationally in the Philippines on 25 June, Singapore on 2 July, Mongolia on 3 July, and North America on 10 July, with additional releases planned in Indonesia, Malaysia, Vietnam, Russia, and Japan.

The film was selected for the Panorama section of the competition at the 59th Sitges Film Festival.

== Reception ==
=== Critical response ===
Lee Min-ji of Yonhap News gave the film a mixed review, praising its use of visual techniques to portray the protagonist's deteriorating eyesight and Shin Min-a's performance, while noting that its classical suspense influences and theatrical style may feel unnatural to some viewers.

=== Box office ===
The Eyes topped the South Korean box office for three consecutive weeks following its release. According to the Korean Film Council's integrated computer network, the film attracted 257,814 viewers during its third weekend, bringing its cumulative attendance to 1.27 million.
