= Goodbye Earth =

2024 South Korean television series

- Promotional poster
- Hangul: 종말의 바보
- Lit.: The Fool At the End of the World
- RR: Jongmarui babo
- MR: Chongmarŭi pabo
- Genre: Science fiction; Dystopian
- Based on: The Fool At the End of the World by Kōtarō Isaka
- Written by: Jung Sung-joo
- Directed by: Kim Jin-min
- Starring: Ahn Eun-jin; Yoo Ah-in; Jeon Sung-woo; Kim Yoon-hye
- Music by: Hwang Sang-joon
- Country of origin: South Korea
- Original language: Korean
- No. of episodes: 12

Production
- Executive producer: Lim Young-jin
- Producer: Lee Young-sook
- Cinematography: Son Won-ho; Cho Sung-hwan
- Editor: Nam In-joo
- Running time: 48–65 minutes
- Production companies: IMTV; Studio S

Original release
- Network: Netflix
- Release: April 26, 2024

Goodbye Earth (Korean: 종말의 바보) is a 2024 South Korean sci-fi dystopian television series written by Jung Sung-joo, directed by Kim Jin-min, and starring Ahn Eun-jin, Yoo Ah-in, Jeon Sung-woo and Kim Yoon-hye, based on the novel of the same name by Kōtarō Isaka. It was released on Netflix on April 26, 2024, and received generally negative reviews.

== Plot ==
The series follows the final 200 days before an asteroid is expected to collide with Earth on February 22, 2026. South Korea has been placed under martial law following an outbreak of violence and an attempted coup since the announcement of the asteroid's approach. Many wealthy citizens have fled the country to supposed safe zones, and remaining residents have to deal with hopelessness, reduced supplies, widespread suicide, rampant crime, and various scams offering supposed salvation.

In the city of Woongcheon, four friends struggle with the changed circumstances: Jin Se-kyeong, a former teacher who works as a volunteer at city hall; Dr. Ha Yun-sang, Se-kyeong's scientist fiancé who was stuck in the US during the riots; Captain Kang In-a, an army captain trying to control her support unit; and Father Woo Sung-jae, an assistant priest who has to take charge of the parish when the main priest disappears.

Se-kyeong is involved in the lives of her former students, and learns about a human trafficking ring run by escaped convicts, who kidnap children and were responsible for the deaths of many of her students. Kang In-a's investigation leads her to the same group, as the escaped convicts are working together with discharged soldiers to run gambling dens and brothels. The crime rings are connected to a cult-like elitist group that is gathering funds to buy their escape to another country. Sung-jae faces a crisis of faith when he learns that his superior, Father Baek, is part of this elitist group and absconded with church funds to join them. Yun-sang has the opportunity to join this group and bring Se-kyeong with him, as he is a geneticist whose research will be important for humanity's post-asteroid survival, but he refuses to leave without Se-kyeong, who refuses to abandon her former students.

The four friends and their allies learn that the elitist group have arranged for two planes to pick them up for a last chance to escape South Korea. Se-kyeong, Yun-sang and Sung-jae attempt to negotiate for the children to be allowed to leave, but are unsuccessful. However, one plane is unable to land due to protests on the emergency landing strip, and the other plane crashes en route, killing all aboard.

In the last remaining days before the asteroid's arrival, various residents try to find peace, settle unfinished business, or fall into despair. Se-kyeong and Yun-Sang get married but are troubled by what they have learned about each other. Yun-sang runs a memorial project to document as much of Woongcheon and its residents for possible future visitors. In-a is discharged from the army and drives off to be on her own. Sung-jae leaves the priesthood but continues to care for the community. Se-kyeong is still tormented by the loss of her students and, upon learning that criminals have resumed trafficking children, goes to their gambling den with a gun to kill them.

== Cast and characters ==
- Ahn Eun-jin as Jin Se-kyung

A volunteer at Ungcheon City Hall who struggles secretly to protect children in danger.

- Yoo Ah-in as Ha Yun-sang

Se-kyung's longtime lover and a researcher at a biotechnology research institute.

- Jeon Sung-woo as Woo Seong-jae

An assistant priest who takes care of the believers, on behalf of the chief priest who disappeared after the asteroid incident was announced.

- Kim Yoon-hye as Kang In-ah

A company commander of a combat service support battalion.

- Kim Kang-hoon as Park Jin-seo
- Lee Hwi-jong as Jo In-tae
- Baek Joo-hee as Do Jeong-ah
- Park Joo-hee as Lee Chae-hwan
- Seo Ye-hwa as So Joo-yeon

== Episodes ==
No.	Title	Directed by	Written by	Original release date
1	"Football, Bloody Hell!"; Transliteration: "Chukgu, jegiral jeoreol jul arasseo!" (Korean: 축구, 제기랄 저럴 줄 알았어!)	Kim Jin-min	Jung Sung-joo	April 26, 2024
2	"Love is Back,"; Transliteration: "Reobeu ijeu baek" (Korean: 러브 이즈 백)	Kim Jin-min	Jung Sung-joo	April 26, 2024
3	"I Have Butterflies..."; Transliteration: "Jomajomahae" (Korean: 조마조마해)	Kim Jin-min	Jung Sung-joo	April 26, 2024
4	"Felix Culpa"; Transliteration: "Haengbokan joe" (Korean: 행복한 죄)	Kim Jin-min	Jung Sung-joo	April 26, 2024
5	"The Girl with a Cat"; Transliteration: "Goyangireul ango on sonyeo" (Korean: 고양이를 안고 온 소녀)	Kim Jin-min	Jung Sung-joo	April 26, 2024
6	"Much Ado About Nothing"; Transliteration: "Heotsodong" (Korean: 헛소동)	Kim Jin-min	Jung Sung-joo	April 26, 2024
7	"Arirang; Gone, But Not Forgotten"; Transliteration: "Arirang; gatjiman, ityeojijin ana" (Korean: 아리랑; 갔지만, 잊혀지진 않아)	Kim Jin-min	Jung Sung-joo	April 26, 2024
8	"Dum Spiro Spero"; Transliteration: "Sara sum swineun han" (Korean: 살아 숨 쉬는 한)	Kim Jin-min	Jung Sung-joo	April 26, 2024
9	"Silver Lining"; Transliteration: "Sillan gateun" (Korean: 실낱 같은)	Kim Jin-min	Jung Sung-joo	April 26, 2024
10	"Exodus, Eclipsed"; Transliteration: "Talchul, ijireojida" (Korean: 탈출, 이지러지다)	Kim Jin-min	Jung Sung-joo	April 26, 2024
11	"Last Christmas"; Transliteration: "Majimang keuriseumaseu" (Korean: 마지막 크리스마스)	Kim Jin-min	Jung Sung-joo	April 26, 2024
12	"Goodbye Earth"; Transliteration: "Annyeong jigu" (Korean: 안녕 지구)	Kim Jin-min	Jung Sung-joo	April 26, 2024

== Production and release ==
On January 13, 2022, casting was confirmed by the production. In May 2022, it was reported that the filming is currently in progress.

The series was supposed to be released on Netflix in the fourth quarter of 2023. However, it was postponed and also edited to remove the amount of Yoo Ah-in's appearance in the series as much as possible, following his drug use charges. The series was released on April 26, 2024.

== Reception ==
=== Critical response ===
Jonathan Wilson of Ready Steady Cut rated the series a 4/5 and described that even if "isn't perfect, and the required investment will be off-putting to some, but it's a compellingly human take on the disaster format". Bhavna Agarwal of India Today rated it a 2/5 and wrote that "a good plotline is wasted by poor execution" and commend actor for doing their best to "salvage the drama". Charles Hartford of But Why Tho? gave a score of 7 out of 10 and wrote that it "delivers great characters and some powerful human moments" and "explores hope, despair, love, and resilience in a uniquely authentic way". Tanu I. Raj of NME rated it a 2/5 and highlighted the show's strengths, such as the "contrast between the protagonist's role as a teacher and a vigilante, as well as the small, human moments that offset the heavy, oppressive atmosphere", however, it also criticized the show's "frequent time jumps and convoluted subplots, which detract from the larger narrative of the impending disaster" and overall has the potential for "a stronger story, but it ultimately stumbles in its execution". Lee Yoon-seo of The Korea Herald wrote that it "fails to keep the audience engaged throughout its 12-hour runtime due to its chaotic and hard-to-follow sequencing" and "the disorderly timeline, with the series jumping between different time periods, adds to the confusion", but the "outstanding performances by the actors, particularly Ahn Eun-jin, may still draw in viewers". Jeff Spry of Space.com described it as "slow pacing, confusing plot, and lack of thrilling asteroid-related content, noting that it can be difficult to watch as the situation deteriorates", however, it acknowledged that it does not "sugarcoat the grim reality of the situation". Melissa Camacho of Common Sense Media wrote that it has "an interesting premise, but the problem is that Goodbye Earth has too many narratives playing out at once, many of which aren't fully fleshed out".

=== Viewership ===
Goodbye Earth ranked eighth in Netflix's Global Top 10 TV (Non-English) category after three days of its release and received a warm response in 22 countries being listed in the Top 10. The following week, the series rose to fifth place with 20.2 million hours watched by 1.7 million viewers.
