= Ahn Eun-jin =

South Korean actress (born 1991)

- Ahn in October 2026
- Born: May 6, 1991 (age 35); Seoul, South Korea
- Education: Korea National University of Arts
- Occupation: Actress
- Years active: 2011–present
- Agent: United Artist Agency

Korean name
- Hangul: 안은진
- Hanja: 安恩眞
- RR: An Eunjin
- MR: An Ŭnjin

Ahn Eun-jin (Korean: 안은진; born May 6, 1991) is a South Korean actress. She first gained recognition for her supporting role in Hospital Playlist (2020–2021). Ahn later starred in the Shim Na-yeon-directed The Good Bad Mother (2023), and My Dearest (2023), receiving a Best Actress nomination at the 60th Baeksang Arts Awards for her role in the latter. She has also starred in the films The Night Owl (2022) and Citizen of a Kind (2024).

== Early life and education ==
Ahn Eun-jin was born on May 6, 1991, in Seoul, the eldest of two daughters. She attended Hakdong Elementary School. During this period, she co-hosted a church event, an experience that sparked an interest in the performing arts and led her to record an aspiration to become a celebrity in her childhood diary. She continued to participate in performance activities throughout middle and high school, singing and dancing at school festivals.

After graduating from high school, Ahn enrolled at the Korea National University of Arts. She was a member of the "Class of 2010," a cohort noted for having several prominent actors, including Kim Go-eun, Lee Yoo-young, and Park So-dam, as well as Lee Sang-yi, Kim Sung-cheol, Cha Seo-won, and Lee Hwi-jong.

== Career ==
=== Beginning ===
Ahn began her acting career during her college years, debuting in the 2012 musical The Sorrows of Young Werther.

In 2015, she performed in the play The Story of Tail Cotton, directed by her professor Yi Sang-woo to celebrate the 20th anniversary of the Chaimu Troupe. Ahn initially felt her performance was lacking, but fellow actor Lee Joong-ok later offered reassurance regarding her acting. Reflecting on their discussion, Ahn noted that the production marked a turning point in her career, as she learned to overcome professional difficulties despite her own self-criticism.

Later that year, Ahn appeared in the musical Infinite Power, directed by Park Hee-soon. The production followed a group of young people living in the boarding house of an eccentric inventor attempting to create an infinite energy device. Debuting in the role of Kim Sol on September 4, 2015, Ahn received positive reviews that praised her versatile acting, comedic timing, and clear vocals. The musical ran at the Daehangno TOM 1 Theater until January 3, 2016.

=== Breakthrough ===
In April 2018, Imagine Asia announced that Ahn had signed an exclusive contract with the agency. She then transitioned into television, appearing in supporting roles in dramas such as Kingdom, My Fellow Citizens, Possessed, Life, and The Crowned Clown. In August 2019, Ahn portrayed precinct police officer So Jeong-hwa in the OCN series Strangers from Hell. During this period, she also signed an exclusive contract with Big Boss Entertainment.

Ahn auditioned for a role in the medical drama Hospital Playlist, written by Lee Woo-jung and directed by Shin Won-ho. After an initial audition and a second meeting months later, she was cast in the role of Chu Min-ha. Ahn noted that she had nearly lost hope of being selected due to the long wait and expressed that she felt fortunate to be cast. In August 2021, Ahn signed an exclusive contract with United Artist Agency.

=== Transition to leading roles ===
In 2021, Ahn took on her first leading role as the protagonist Pyo In-sook in the JTBC drama The One and Only. She portrayed a terminally ill woman who had become emotionally detached from life, struggling to process her feelings.

In 2023, Ahn portrayed Lee Mi-joo in the JTBC drama The Good Bad Mother. Her character is a nail artist and the childhood friend and former girlfriend of the protagonist, Choi Kang-ho (Lee Do-hyun), a resilient single mother raising twins. That same year, Ahn starred as Yoo Gil-chae in the MBC historical drama My Dearest. The character is a noblewoman who becomes entangled with Lee Jang-hyun (Namkoong Min) amidst the Qing invasion of Joseon.

Ahn starred in SBS TV's romantic comedy television series Dynamite Kiss opposite Jang Ki-yong from November to December 2025. She played Go Da-rim, a single woman who posed as a married person to get a job.

== Filmography ==
=== Film ===
Year	Title	Role	Note(s)	Ref.
2012	Fantastic Duo	Eun-jeong	Short film	
2012	Picnic Together	Ji-eun	Short film	
2013	Saminseongho	Min-jeong	Short film	
2014	It Looks Like It's Going to Snow	Eun-young	Short film	
2014	Not Okay at All	Ha-na	Short film	
2014	Dating	A-hye	Short film	
2016	The Beauty Salon	Ji-hye	Short film	
2016	Dolgorae Bada	Eun-ah	Short film	
2022	The Night Owl	Jo So-young	Feature film debut	
2024	Citizen of a Kind	Ae-rim		

=== Television series ===
Year	Title	Role	Notes	Ref.
2018	Life	Lee Jeong-seon	Cameo	
2019	The Crowned Clown	Royal concubine		
2019–2020	Kingdom	Mu-yeong's wife	Season 1–2	
2019	Possessed	Choi Yeon-hee		
2019	My Fellow Citizens!	Park Gwi-nam		
2019	Hell Is Other People	So Jeong-hwa		
2019–2020	Diary of a Prosecutor	Seong Mi-ran		
2020	More Than Friends	Kim Young-hee		
2020–2021	Hospital Playlist	Chu Min-ha	Season 1–2	
2021	Dark Hole	So Jeong-hwa	Cameo (episode 1–2)	
2021	The Witch's Diner	Jin Sun-mi	Cameo (episode 1, 3–4)	
2021–2022	The One and Only	Pyo In-sook		
2023	The Good Bad Mother	Lee Mi-joo		
2023	My Dearest	Yoo Gil-chae		
2024	Goodbye Earth	Jin Se-kyung		
2025	Resident Playbook	Chu Min-ha	Cameo (episode 2, 12)	
2025	Genie, Make a Wish	Lee Mi-joo		
2025	Dynamite Kiss	Go Da-rim		
2026	A Love Other Than Yours	Lee Mi-do		
2027	My Ghostly Running Mate †	Gu Seung-hee	Special appearance	

=== Web series ===
Year	Title	Role	Ref.
2018	Number Woman Gye Sook-ja	Jo An-na	

=== Television shows ===
Year	Title	Roles	Note(s)	Ref.
2024	Fresh off the Sea	Main cast	Season 1	

=== Music video appearances ===
Year	Title	Artist(s)	Ref.
2020	"Warmth" (온기)	Lim Young-woong	

== Theater ==
=== Musical ===
Musical play performances of Ahn
Year	Title		Role	Venue (Note: All venues are in Seoul unless stated otherwise)	Date	Ref.
Year	English	Korean	Role	Venue	Date	Ref.
2012	Werther	베르테르	Eegre	Universal Art Center	October 25 – December 16, 2012	
2013	Arirang Gyeongseong 26 Years	아리랑 경성26년	No Jin-yo	Suseong Artpia Yongji Hall, Daegu	June 21 – July 10, 2013	
2013	Dorian Gray	도리안 그레이	Sybil Vane	Project Box Seeya	July 15–17, 2013	
2014	Seya Platform – Actors	시야 플랫폼 - 배우들		Project Box Seeya	August 23–25, 2014	
2014	The Next Page	더 넥스트 페이지		Ansan Arts Center Dalmaji Theater, Ansan	December 17–23, 2014	
2015	Gaya Twelve Songs	가야십이지곡	So-yool	Art One Theater 2	January 24 – February 1, 2015	
2015	Infinite Power	무한동력	Kim Sol	Daehak-ro TOM Hall 1	September 4, 2015 – January 3, 2016	
2016	Vanishing	배니싱	Mi-ji	Daehak-ro TOM Hall 2	March 10–13, 2016	
2016	Hello, Summer	안녕, 여름	Ran	Uniplex Hall 2	September 6 – October 30, 2016	
2016	Black Mary Poppins	블랙 메리 포핀스	Anna Lea	Daehak-ro TOM Hall 1	October 14, 2016 – January 15, 2017	
2016	Whale on a Tree	나무 위의 고래	Dia	Project Box Seeya	December 22–24, 2016	
2017	R&D Works Concert	알앤디웍스 콘서트		Blue Square Woori WON Banking Hall	August 12, 2017	
2017	I Love You	아이러브유	Woman 1	Art One Theater 1	December 14, 2017 – March 11, 2018	

=== Theater play ===
Theater play performances of Ahn
Year	Title		Role	Venue	Date	Ref.
Year	English	Korean	Role	Venue	Date	Ref.
2011	Beautiful Sign	아름다운 사인	Lee Soo-min	—N/a		
2015	Seureulseumeul Chaimu - The Tale of the Tail	스물스물 차이무 - 꼬리솜 이야기	Magumboromi	Art Madang Hall 2 in Daehak-ro	November 16–29, 2015	
2016	Hello, Summer	안녕, 여름	Ran	Uniplex Hall 2	September 6 – October 30, 2016	
2017	Judo Boy	유도소년	Hwa-young	Yes24 Stage 3	March 4 – May 14, 2017	
2024	Silent Sea	사일런트 스카이	Henrietta Swan Leavitt	National Theater Company Myeongdong Arts Theater	November 29 – December 28, 2024	

== Accolades ==
=== Awards and nominations ===
Name of the award ceremony, year presented, category, nominee of the award, and the result of the nomination
Award ceremony	Year	Category	Nominee / Work	Result	Ref.
APAN Star Awards	2021	Best New Actress	Hospital Playlist	Nominated	
Asia Artist Awards	2020	Focus Award	Hospital Playlist	Won	
Baeksang Arts Awards	2023	Best Supporting Actress – Film	The Night Owl	Nominated	
Baeksang Arts Awards	2024	Best Actress – Television	My Dearest	Nominated	
Blue Dragon Film Awards	2023	Best New Actress	The Night Owl	Nominated	
Blue Dragon Series Awards	2024	Best Actress	Goodbye Earth	Nominated	
Buil Film Awards	2023	Best New Actress	The Night Owl	Nominated	
Director's Cut Awards	2023	Best New Actress in Film	The Night Owl	Nominated	
Grand Bell Awards	2023	Best New Actress	The Night Owl	Nominated	
Grimae Awards	2023	Best Actress	My Dearest	Won	
Korea First Brand Awards	2021	Female Actress (Rising Star) Award	Ahn Eun-jin	Won	
MBC Drama Awards	2023	Top Excellence Award, Actress in a Miniseries	My Dearest	Won	
MBC Drama Awards	2023	Best Couple Award	Ahn Eun-jin (with Namkoong Min); My Dearest	Won	
OCN Awards	2019	The Unexpected Award	Hell Is Other People	Won	
SBS Drama Awards	2025	Excellence Award, Actress in a Miniseries Romance/Comedy Drama	Dynamite Kiss	Won	
SBS Drama Awards	2025	Best Couple Award	Ahn Eun-jin (with Jang Ki-yong); Dynamite Kiss	Won	

=== State honors ===
Name of the country, name of the ceremony, year presented, and the award given
Country	Ceremony	Year	Award	Ref.
South Korea	Korean Popular Culture and Arts Awards (Note: Honors are given at the Korean Popular Culture and Arts Awards, arranged by the Korea Creative Content Agency and hosted by the Ministry of Culture, Sports and Tourism. They are awarded to those who have contributed to the arts and South Korea's pop culture.)	2024	Minister of Culture, Sports and Tourism Commendation	

=== Listicles ===
Name of publisher, year listed, name of listicle, and placement
Publisher	Year	Listicle	Placement	Ref.
Forbes	2024	Korea Power Celebrity 40	15th	
Gallup Korea	2023	Gallup Korea's Television Actor of the Year	4th	
