= Late Spring (2014 film) =

- Theatrical release poster
- Hangul: 봄
- RR: Bom
- MR: Pom
- Directed by: Cho Geun-hyun
- Written by: Shin Yang-jung
- Screenplay by: Cho Geun-hyun
- Produced by: Shin Yang-jung
- Starring: Park Yong-woo; Kim Seo-hyung; Lee Yoo-young
- Cinematography: Kim Jung-won
- Edited by: Ham Sung-won
- Music by: Ki-heon Park
- Distributed by: M-Line Distribution
- Release dates: February 20, 2014 (Santa Barbara Film Festival); November 20, 2014
- Running time: 102 minutes
- Country: South Korea
- Language: Korean

Late Spring (Korean: 봄; RR: Bom) is a 2014 South Korean romance melodrama starring Park Yong-woo, Kim Seo-hyung and Lee Yoo-young. It portrays the true beauty and the platonic love discovered between a genius sculptor and his final model. It made its world premiere at the Santa Barbara International Film Festival in January 2014.

== Plot ==
A genius sculptor Joon-goo (Park Yong-woo) suffers from a progressive muscular paralysis and loses the meaning of life after the Korean War. His wife (Kim Seo-hyung) who dedicates herself to her beloved husband, goes in search of a model (Lee Yoo-young) to encourage him to go back to work.

== Cast ==
- Park Yong-woo as Joon-goo
- Kim Seo-hyung as Jung-sook
- Lee Yoo-young as Min-kyung
- Joo Young-ho as Geun-soo
- Kim Su-an as Song-yi
- Bae Soo-bin as Ray Bang

== Awards and nominations ==
Year	Award	Category	Recipient	Result
2014	23rd Arizona International Film Festival	Best Foreign Feature Film	Late Spring	Won
2014	14th Milan International Film Festival	Best Film	Late Spring	Won
2014	14th Milan International Film Festival	Best Director	Cho Geun-hyun	Nominated
2014	14th Milan International Film Festival	Best Actress	Lee Yoo-young	Won
2014	14th Milan International Film Festival	Best Supporting Actor	Park Yong-woo	Nominated
2014	14th Milan International Film Festival	Best Supporting Actress	Kim Seo-hyung	Nominated
2014	14th Milan International Film Festival	Best Screenplay	Cho Geun-hyun	Nominated
2014	14th Milan International Film Festival	Best Cinematography	Kim Jung-won	Won
2014	14th Milan International Film Festival	Best Music	Lee Seung-yup	Won
2014	13th Asian Film Festival of Dallas	Best Asian Narrative Feature Film	Late Spring	Won
2014	13th Asian Film Festival of Dallas	Best Cinematography	Kim Jung-won	Won
2014	3rd Madrid International Film Festival	Best Foreign Language Feature Film	Late Spring	Won
2014	3rd Madrid International Film Festival	Best Lead Actress in a Foreign Language Film	Kim Seo-hyung	Won
2014	3rd Madrid International Film Festival	Best Producer in a Foreign Language Film	Shin Yang-jung	Nominated
2015	6th KOFRA Film Awards	Best New Actress	Lee Yoo-young	Won
2015	2nd Wildflower Film Awards	Best New Actress	Lee Yoo-young	Nominated
2015	24th Buil Film Awards	Best New Actress	Lee Yoo-young	Won
2015	52nd Grand Bell Awards	Best New Actress	Lee Yoo-young	Won
2015	52nd Grand Bell Awards	Best New Director	Cho Geun-hyun	Nominated
2015	52nd Grand Bell Awards	Best Cinematography	Kim Jung-won	Nominated
