= The Piper (2015 film) =

- Theatrical poster
- Hangul: 손님
- RR: Sonnim
- MR: Sonnim
- Directed by: Kim Gwang-tae
- Written by: Kim Gwang-tae
- Produced by: Kim Dong-woo; Lee Han
- Starring: Ryu Seung-ryong; Lee Sung-min; Chun Woo-hee; Lee Joon
- Cinematography: Hong Jae-sik
- Edited by: Kim Chang-ju
- Music by: Lee Ji-soo
- Production company: UBU Film
- Distributed by: CJ Entertainment
- Release date: July 9, 2015
- Running time: 119 minutes
- Country: South Korea
- Language: Korean
- Budget: US$4 million
- Box office: US$5.5 million

The Piper (Korean: 손님; RR: Sonnim; lit. 'The Guest') is a 2015 South Korean horror film inspired by the Pied Piper of Hamelin legend. It is written and directed by Kim Gwang-tae, in his directorial debut.

== Plot ==
In the 1950s after the Korean War, a gentle wandering piper with a limp, Woo-ryong, and his sick young son, Young-nam, are en route by foot to Seoul through the central Korean highlands when they reach a remote village. The village chief allows Woo-ryong and his son to stay at his house. The piper shows the Chief an English-written note that he says is the name of an American doctor at a hospital in Seoul who can treat Young-nam. The Chief, who tells the piper not to tell anyone else the war is over, agrees but he cannot read English either. Woo-ryong is smitten by a villager called Mi-sook, who lost her husband and child in the war.

Woo-ryong quickly sees that the village is plagued by rats that do not fear humans and do not fall for traps and poisons. The chief explains he and his people came here when they heard Chinese soldiers were approaching their old village. They hid the village lepers in a cave with the village shaman. But when the Chinese had not reached the village, they returned to the cave, but found all the lepers were dead and being eaten by rats. The vicious vermin then invaded the village because it had no shaman to keep them out.

Woo-ryong volunteers to get rid of the rats in exchange for the price of a cow that will help pay for his son's medical treatment. He spreads a special powder across the village and goes to a nearby hilltop. Checking the wind direction, he lights a very smoky fire that smothers the village in smoke. At the same time, Mi-sook, who has been forced by the chief to become the new village shaman, begins a purification ritual with bells. Rats start pouring out of the buildings following Woo-ryung's powder into a cave.

Mi-sook starts to fall in love with Woo-ryung due to his kind nature. The son even starts to call her "mummy". However, the chief threatens her if she plans to leave the village after learning that Woo-ryung invited Mi-sook to go to Seoul with him and his son to start a family together. It has turned out that the chief intends to keep the villagers ignorant about the end of the Korean War to maintain his control over the people, since if the people found out that the war is over, they would leave the village for a better life in the city or go back to the old village. He also plots with his son, Nam-soo, not to reward the Piper for getting rid of the rats out of petty greed, and Nam-soo is also jealous of Woo-ryong for gaining Mi-sook's affection. Taking advantage of the ignorance of the villagers, first, they create doubt in the mind of the male villagers, making them believe that Woo-ryong is a communist spy who brought the rats with him. At a village meeting, the chief says he is going to pay for the piper, but a dead cat is found. Proof, the chief says, that the rats are back. He holds up Woo-ryung's English note and says its spying material; it simply reads "Kiss my ass, monkey" — no American doctor's name, just a cruel joke.

Woo-ryung reaches for the money, but Nam-soo chops off two of his fingers with a knife. The villagers turn on Woo-ryung and Young-nam, and even Mi-sook condemns them. But as the villagers get ready to throw them out, Mi-sook returns in a shamanic trance, but is stabbed in the stomach. She tells the villagers that on a day without sun, they will all die, and their children might live or die, repeating the original shaman's prophecy before she was locked up and burned alive by the villagers. Mi-sook then dies from her wounds.

Before they leave, the Chief puts two poison rice balls in Woo-ryung's knapsack to kill them, to prevent the father and son from telling anyone about the location of the village. The injured piper falls asleep while his son sneaks back to the village to retrieve his father's pipe from the Chief's house. On the way back, Young-nam ate one of the poisoned rice balls and died.

Woo-ryong sets out on a revenge. After burning his son's body on a funeral pyre, he covers himself in the special powder he used earlier to attract the rats and reopens the cave. He uses his two severed fingers as bait and starts playing his pipe to lead the rats back to the village, where they devour all the adults, including the chief and his son. The next morning, only the villagers' children are alive. Woo-ryung plays his pipe and leads them to the cave where he trapped the rats. After sealing them all in, he turns and looks hard into the camera.

== Cast ==
- Ryu Seung-ryong as Woo-ryong
- Lee Sung-min as Village chief
- Chun Woo-hee as Mi-sook
- Lee Joon as Nam-soo
- Goo Seung-hyun as Young-nam
- Jung Kyung-ho as Chul-soo's father
- Kim Jung-young as Chul-soo's mother
- Park Yoon-seok as Pil-geun
- Yoon Dae-yeol as Bong-woo
- Lee Dong-hee as Dae-hee
- Lee Seung-joon as Seung-pal
- Kim Jin-wook as Jin-seong
- Do Gi-beom as Bong-pil
- Lee Won-seop as Seung-won
- Lee Sang-ok as Mi-ok
- Shin Mi-yeong as Yeon-mi
- Kim Seon-kyeong as Seon-ja
- Son San as Myeong-san
- Lee Min-ji as Min-young
- Jung Joon-won as Chul-soo
- Ham Sung-min as Dong-choon
- Song Ye-dam as Young-ho
- Song Ye-joon as Young-seong
- Baek Seung-ho as Dam-soo
- Lee Seo-yeon as Myeong-ran
- Park Si-yeon as Ah-ran
- Park Woong-bi as Mi-ja
- Kim Young-sun as Mudang
- Han Seong-yong as Deok-soo the leper
- Jeon Gook-hwan as Elder

== Production ==
The film was shot on location in the Korean highlands of Gangwon Province.

== Reception ==
The Piper received mostly positive reviews from critics, who praised the film's atmosphere, Maggie Lee from Variety praised the film's performances, cinematography, and historical/political themes. Lee concluded her review by writing, "As a bleak fable on human nature, it's pretty old hat, but as an allegory on Korean history and politics, the movie proves cynically observant, with starkly economical storytelling and sharp visual effects to boot." Luke Ryan Baldock from Hollywood News, rating the film four out of five stars, offered the film similar praise, writing, " It's depressing to be sure, but very rewarding for lovers of dark cinema". Time Out awarded the film four out of five stars, writing, "Frequently arresting and blowing a breath of originality into this year's stale crop of commercial Korean fare, Kim's film only falters with a needlessly lengthy setup and a few inchoate sideplots. Those minor grievances aside, The Piper remains a wickedly fun gust of chills that is just the ticket to beat the heat this season." Pierce Conran of Screen Anarchy called the film "engrossing and entertaining", praising the film's characterizations, imagery, emotional resonance, and finale.

== Awards and nominations ==
Year	Award	Category	Recipient	Result
2015	24th Buil Film Awards	Best Supporting Actor	Lee Sung-min	Nominated
2015	24th Buil Film Awards	Best Supporting Actress	Chun Woo-hee	Nominated
2015	24th Buil Film Awards	Best New Director	Kim Gwang-tae	Nominated
2015	24th Buil Film Awards	Best Screenplay	Kim Gwang-tae	Nominated
2015	24th Buil Film Awards	Best Cinematography	Hong Jae-sik	Nominated
2015	24th Buil Film Awards	Best Art Direction	Kang So-young	Nominated
2015	24th Buil Film Awards	Best Music	Lee Ji-soo	Nominated
2015	52nd Grand Bell Awards	Best New Director	Kim Gwang-tae	Nominated

== Home media ==
The film was released in the United States by CJ Entertainment on February 2, 2016.
