= Dare to Love Me (TV series) =

2024 South Korean television series

- Promotional poster
- Hangul: 함부로 대해줘
- Lit.: Treat Me Carelessly
- RR: Hamburo daehaejwo
- MR: Hamburo taehaejwŏ
- Genre: Romantic comedy
- Based on: Treat Me Carelessly by Sun Woo
- Written by: Park Yu-mi
- Directed by: Jang Yang-ho
- Starring: Kim Myung-soo; Lee Yoo-young
- Music by: Baek Eun-woo
- Opening theme: "It's Alright" by Lee Chang-sub
- Country of origin: South Korea
- Original language: Korean
- No. of episodes: 16

Production
- Executive producer: Kim Sang-hui (CP)
- Producers: Nam Goong-jung; Kim Cheol-min; Choi Sang-yeol; Kim Chang-min
- Cinematography: Ji Jae-woo; Lee Dong-yoon; Jung Gi-hoon
- Editor: Jung Min
- Running time: 59–63 minutes
- Production company: Fantagio
- Budget: ₩14 billion

Original release
- Network: KBS2
- Release: May 13 – July 2, 2024

Dare to Love Me (Korean: 함부로 대해줘) is a 2024 South Korean television series based on Naver Webtoon of the same name by Sun Woo, starring Kim Myung-soo and Lee Yoo-young. It aired on KBS2 from May 13, to July 2, 2024, every Monday and Tuesday at 22:10 (KST). It is also available for streaming on Netflix and Viki in selected regions.

Dare to Love Me drew the lowest average ratings ever for a Korean drama airing on free television during prime time; after premiering with a rating of 2.3%, all other episodes languished in the 1% range. Its average ratings of 1.3% surpassed the record of 1.4% set by Love All Play, also a KBS2 miniseries, in 2022. The poor performance of Dare to Love Me led KBS2 to suspend the Monday–Tuesday prime time drama slot and schedule the succeeding drama Perfect Family on Wednesdays and Thursdays.

== Cast and characters ==
=== Main ===
- Kim Myung-soo as Shin Yoon-bok
- Lee Yoo-young as Kim Hong-do

=== Supporting ===
- Bae Jong-ok as Jang Camille

The CEO of a luxury fashion brand.

- Seonwoo Jae-deok as Shin Soo-geun

Yoon-bok's grandfather and the head of Seongsan Village.

- Park Eun-seok as Lee Joon-ho

The owner of Seongsan-kwan restaurant.

- Lim Young-joo as Oh Yoon-ah

Yoon-bok's bodyguard and secretary.

- Han Gi-chan as Kim Hong-hak

Hong-do's younger brother and Yoon-bok's only friend.

- Kim Si-hyun as Lee Hyang-gi

Hong-do's senior and the ace of her team at the company.

- Seo Byeok-jun as Lee Do-young

Hong-do's ex-boyfriend.

- Lee Beom-kyo as Park Yoon-hee

- Lee Myung-ho as Frankie Leroit.

Camille's Chief Marketing Officer.

- Jo In as Shin Bok

Yoon-book's sister.

== Original soundtrack ==
=== Part 1 ===
Released on May 14, 2024
No.	Title	Lyrics	Music	Artist	Length
1.	"It's Alright"	Enzo	Enzo; H25; Secret Weapon; Dr. Ahn	Lee Chang-sub	2:39

=== Part 2 ===
Released on May 21, 2024
No.	Title	Lyrics	Music	Artist	Length
1.	"I hope"	Enzo	Enzo; Secret Weapon; Dr. Ahn; CHAEIPAPA	Choi Yoo-jung	4:24

=== Part 3 ===
Released on May 28, 2024
No.	Title	Lyrics	Music	Artist	Length
1.	"I'll let you go" (그대를 보내요)	Enzo	Enzo; H25; Secret Weapon; Dr. Ahn	Ji Soo-yeon (Weki Meki)	3:55

=== Part 4 ===
Released on May 29, 2024
No.	Title	Lyrics	Music	Artist	Length
1.	"One Last Dream" (마지막 꿈)	Baek Eun-woo; Park Bum-geun; Ang-woong	Park Bum-geun; Ji Seong-gyu; Ang-woong	MJ	4:33

== Ratings ==
Average TV viewership ratings (nationwide)
Ep.	Original broadcast date	Average audience share (Nielsen Korea)
1	May 13, 2024	2.3% (25th)
2	May 14, 2024	1.5% (31st)
3	May 20, 2024	1.5% (34th)
4	May 21, 2024	1.4% (32nd)
5	May 27, 2024	1.4% (36th)
6	May 28, 2024	1.1% (37th)
7	June 3, 2024	1.1% (37th)
8	June 4, 2024	1.1% (40th)
9	June 10, 2024	1.0% (37th)
10	June 11, 2024	1.0% (40th)
11	June 17, 2024	1.0% (42nd)
12	June 18, 2024	1.4% (29th)
13	June 24, 2024	1.3% (37th)
14	June 25, 2024	1.3% (35th)
15	July 1, 2024	1.0% (46th)
16	July 2, 2024	1.4% (34th)
Average		1.3%
In the table above, the blue numbers represent the lowest ratings and the red numbers represent the highest ratings.; N/A denotes ratings that were not published.
