= Son Na-eun =

South Korean actress (born 1994)

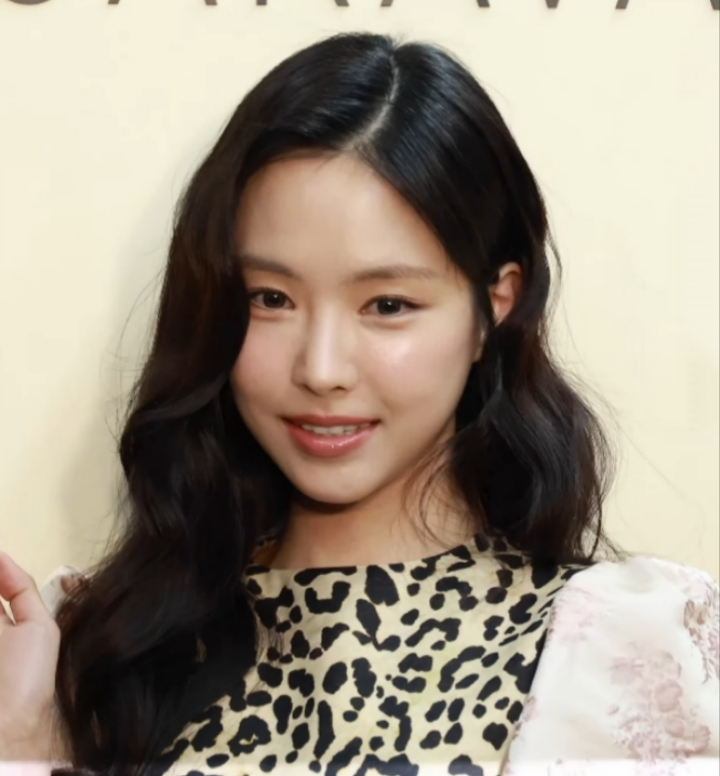
- Son in June 2025
- Born: February 10, 1994 (age 32); Seoul, South Korea
- Education: Dongguk University – Department of Theatre and Film
- Alma mater: School of Performing Arts Seoul
- Occupations: Actress; singer
- Years active: 2011–present
- Agent(s): J,Wide Company
- Awards: Full list
- Musical career
- Genre: K-pop
- Instrument: Vocals
- Years active: 2011–2022
- Label: IST
- Formerly of: Apink

Korean name
- Hangul: 손나은
- Hanja: 孫나은
- RR: Son Naeun
- MR: Son Naŭn

Son Na-eun (Korean: 손나은; born February 10, 1994), known mononymously as Naeun, is a South Korean actress and singer. She gained popularity following her debut as a member of the South Korean girl group, Apink. Apart from her group's activities, Son has also starred in various television series such as The Great Seer (2012), My Kids Give Me a Headache (2012–2013), Second 20s (2015), Cinderella with Four Knights (2016), The Most Beautiful Goodbye (2017), Dinner Mate (2020), Ghost Doctor (2022), Agency (2023), and Romance in the House (2024).

In April 2021, Son left IST Entertainment and remained a member of Apink until April 8, 2022, before withdrawing from the group. Soon after leaving IST, she is currently active as an actress.

== Life and career ==
=== 1994–2010: Early life and career beginnings ===
Son was born on February 10, 1994, in Gangnam District, Seoul, South Korea. She was born into a family lineage with interest in arts. Her mother is an art museum director while her younger sister, named Son Sae-eun, pursues a career in the sports industry as a professional golf player in South Korea. She attended Chungdam High School and later transferred to School of Performing Arts Seoul (SOPA), from which she graduated on February 7, 2013. That same year, she was accepted into Dongguk University's Department of Theatre and Film with a major in acting. She was also chosen as an ambassador for the university, alongside Girls' Generation's Yoona and actress Park Ha-sun, in 2014.

Originally dreaming to become a painter, Son coincidentally stumbled upon auditions for South Korean record label JYP Entertainment. She impulsively attended the auditions and performed "It's Not Love" by Wonder Girls. Thereafter, she was notified of passing their audition and subsequently became a trainee under the agency. However, she soon moved to Cube Entertainment and continued as a trainee. In the midst of training, 16-year-old Son appeared in the music videos "Breath" and "Beautiful" by Beast as its female lead.

=== 2011–2016: Debut with Apink and acting debut ===
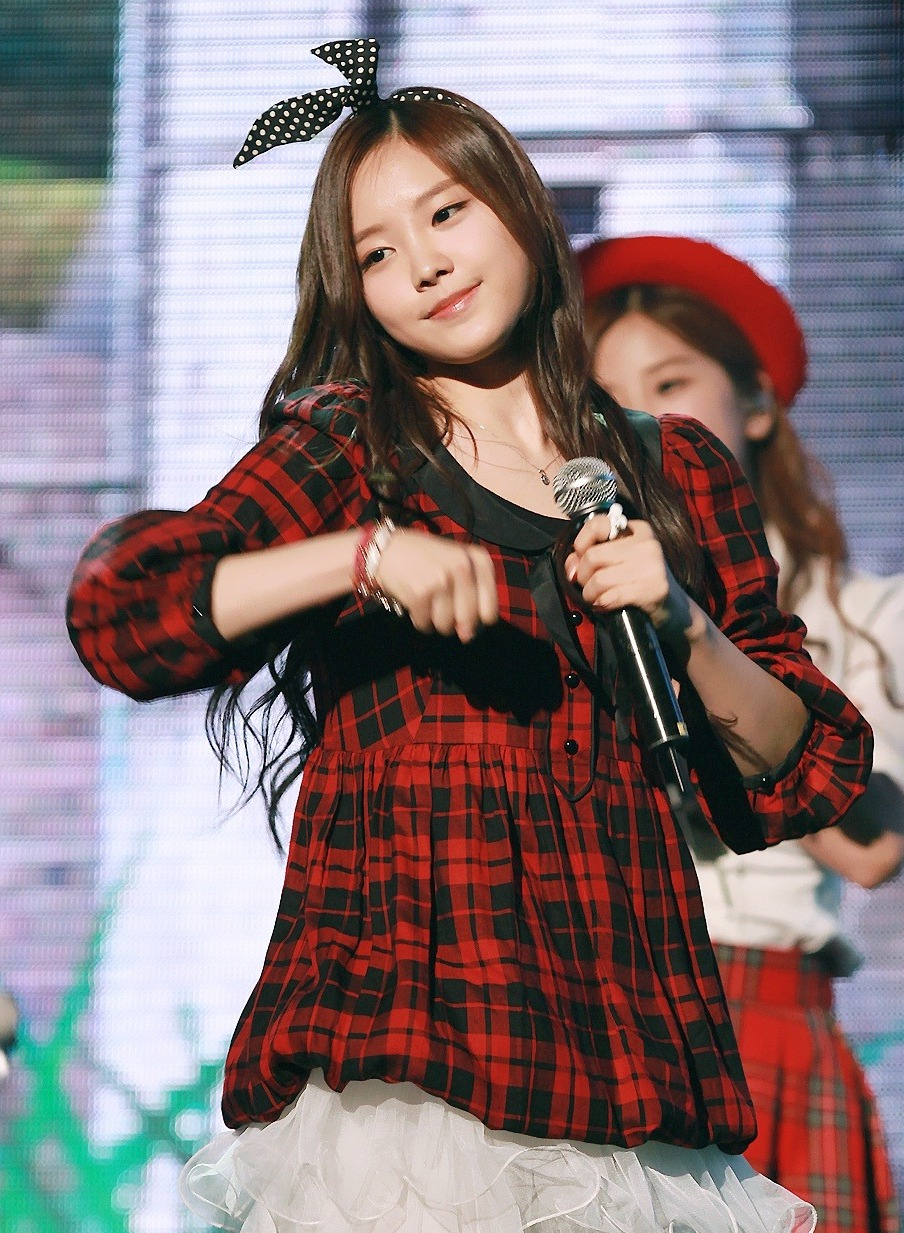
Son performing in 2011

Son was the first Apink member to be announced in February 2011. The group released their debut EP Seven Springs of Apink on April 19 alongside a music video for its lead single "I Don't Know" (몰라요). On April 21, Son officially debuted with Apink under A Cube Entertainment (currently IST Entertainment), an independent label under Cube Entertainment. That same day they began broadcasting promotions on Mnet's M Countdown performing their songs "I Don't Know" (몰라요), and "Wishlist".

In 2012, Son made her acting debut as the teenage Hae-in in the historical drama The Great Seer. She then made her film debut in the fifth installment of comedy series Marrying the Mafia, titled "Return of the Noble Family". Thereafter, Son played supporting roles in family drama Childless Comfort and romantic comedy Second 20s. In 2016, she co-starred in tvN's romantic comedy Cinderella with Four Knights.

Throughout 2013 and 2014, Son starred in fourth installment of MBC reality television series We Got Married with Shinee's Taemin as a virtual married couple, for which her performance on the show won her the "Star of the Year" award and a nomination for the "Best Couple" award at the 2013 MBC Entertainment Awards. The pair were cast as the show's youngest virtual married couple in its history. The virtual married couple bid their farewell to the viewers following the airing of their last episode on January 4, 2014, after 8 months which consisted of 36 aired episodes.

=== 2017–present: Continued solo activities and group departure ===
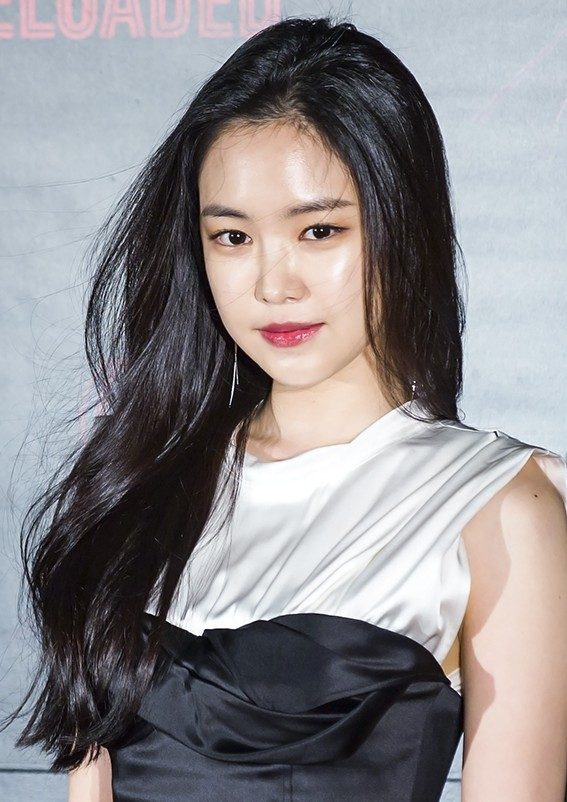
Son in 2018

In 2017, it was confirmed that Son will star in the horror film The Wrath. The same year, she was cast in Noh Hee-kyung's four-episode miniseries The Most Beautiful Goodbye. In 2020, Son starred in MBC's new drama Dinner Mate as a popular social media influencer.

In January 2021, Son was announced to be appearing in the drama Lost.

In April 2021, Son departed from Play M Entertainment after 10 years with the label. However, she will still continue as a member of the group and will participate in their 10th anniversary album later in the year. Later in May 2021, Son signed a contract with YG Entertainment as an actress.

On April 8, 2022, it was reported that Son would be withdrawing from the group Apink due to difficulty balancing work as both an actress and idol. This was later confirmed by IST Entertainment via the group's fancafe.

In May 2025, Son departed YG Entertainment and signed a contract with J,Wide Company.

== Artistry ==
=== Influence ===
Son revealed the moment she was certain she wished to pursue a career in the South Korean music industry was because of veteran singer BoA.

== Public image and impact ==
Among the South Korean commercial industry, Son is often referred to as the "sold-out girl". The nickname originated after all products Son advertised for began to sell out in record time. Photos with any product uploaded on her social media also prompted the items to sell out, including Adidas leggings which were dubbed as "Naeun Leggings" and was viewed as its unofficial model. A liquor brand's product also was in need to produce and re-stock on numerous occasions after a photo was posted on her Instagram account.

Adidas dubbed Son as a MZ generation style icon alongside Mino of Winner.

== Other ventures ==
=== Endorsements ===
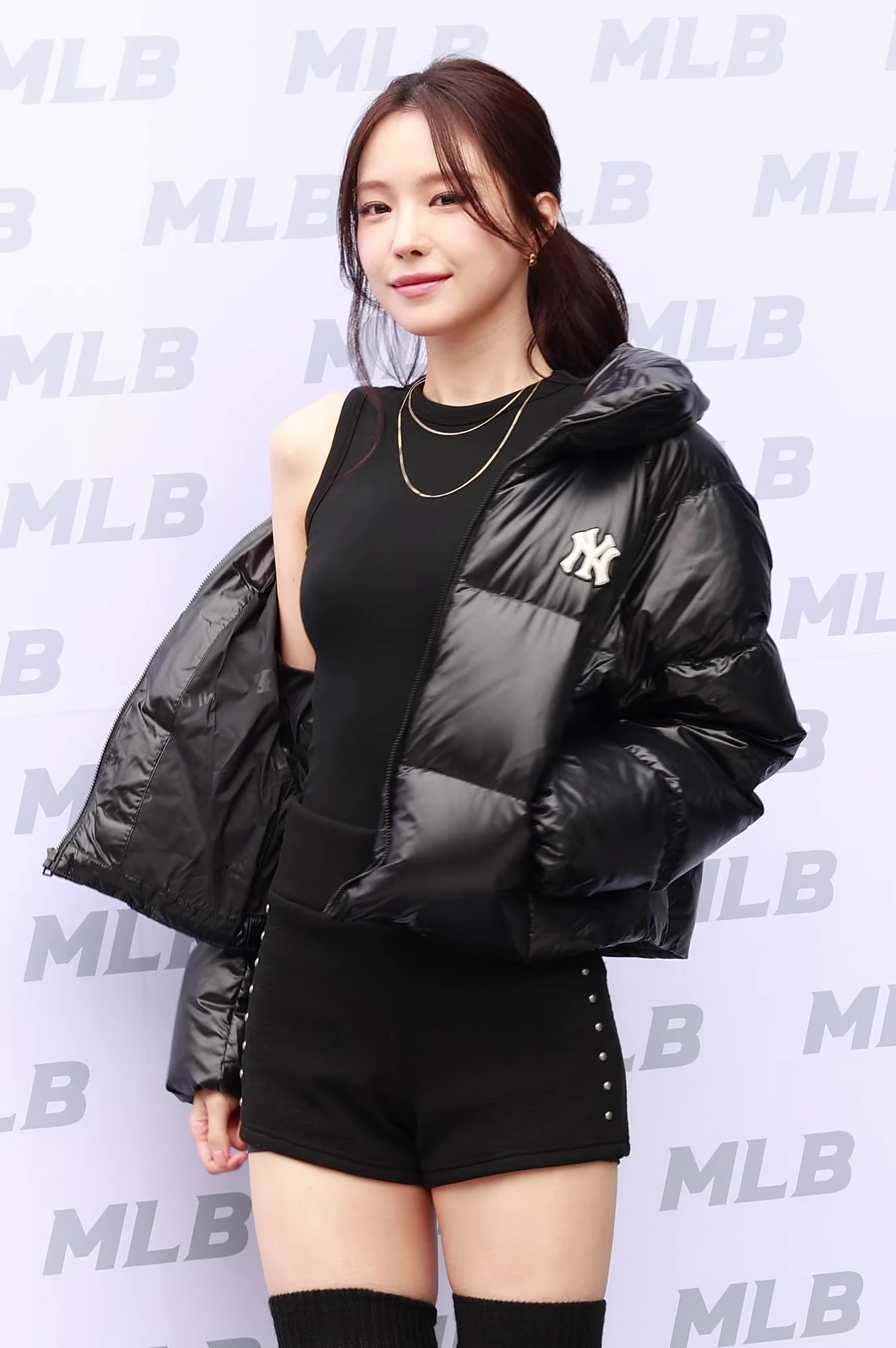
Son at the MLB Hannam flagship store opening in 2024

German sportswear brand, Adidas Korea announced Son was selected as its newest model alongside world-renowned soccer players Gareth Bale and Son Heung-min. She was first revealed through a campaigning video uploaded on January 15, 2018, on their YouTube channel in correlation with the release of their "ZNE 36Hrs Hoodie".

In June 2021, Naeun was selected as the model for global skincare brand Neutrogena. As of June 15, Naeun has been selected to be the model for the brand OA's sonic toothbrush.

=== Philanthropy ===
In celebration of her birthday, Son organized a volunteering event with her fans on February 8, 2018. They commenced with volunteer work at Kkottongnae, a welfare facility located in the North Chungcheong Province. According to her agency, Plan A Entertainment, she once visited the facility during her days in middle school and made up her mind that she would return again in the future. Previously, Son and her fans had also hand-knitted hats for newborns as well as funded wells for impoverished areas overseas.

On February 28, 2020, Son made a donation of 50 million won to the Daegu Community Chest of Korea to help support those affected by the COVID-19 pandemic. Additionally, the donation will be used towards quarantine supplies and medical support for low income families residing in Daegu.

== Discography ==
=== Composition credits ===
All song credits are adapted from the Korea Music Copyright Association's database, unless otherwise noted.

List of songs, showing year released, artist name, and name of the album
Title	Year	Artist	Album	Notes
"Dear (Whisper)"	2016	Apink	Dear	As lyricist and composer
"Cliche" (흔한 일)	2016	Apink	Dear	As lyricist
"Holy Moly"	2022	Apink	Horn	As lyricist

== Filmography ==
=== Film ===
Year	Title	Role	Ref.
2012	Marrying the Mafia 5	Eun Hee-jae	
2018	The Wrath	Ok-boon	

=== Television series ===
Key
†	Denotes television productions that have not yet been released

Year	Title	Role	Notes	Ref.
2012	The Great Seer	Hae-in (young)		
2012	Salamander Guru and The Shadows	Lee Tae-eun	Cameo (Episode 4)	
2012–2013	My Kids Give Me a Headache	Oh Soo-mi		
2015	Second 20s	Oh Hye-mi		
2016	Cinderella with Four Knights	Park Hye-ji		
2017	The Most Beautiful Goodbye	Jae-young		
2020	Dinner Mate	Jin No-eul		
2021	Lost	Min-jeong		
2022	Ghost Doctor	Oh Su-jeong		
2023	Agency	Kang Han-na		
2024	Romance in the House	Byeon Mi-rae		
2024–2025	The Tale of Lady Ok	real Ok Tae-young	Cameo (Episode 1)	
2026	Agent Kim Reactivated	Sang-ah		

=== Web series ===
Year	Title	Role	Notes	Ref.
2018	YG Future Strategy Office	Herself	Cameo (Episode 7)	

=== Television shows ===
Year	Title	Role	Notes	Ref.
2013–2014	We Got Married	Main cast	With Taemin; Episodes 167–203	
2020	Gamsung Camping	Main cast	With Park So-dam, Na-rae, Ahn Young-mi & Solar	
2024	Kang Hyung-wook Dog Guest Show	Main cast	Episode 26	

=== Radio shows ===
Year	Title	Role	Notes	Ref.
2022	This is Ahn Young-mi, the date muse at two o'clock	Special DJ	October 2–3; with Park So-dam	

=== Music video appearances ===
Year	Title	Artist	Ref.
2010	"Breath" (숨)	Beast	
2010	"Beautiful"	Beast	
2012	"The Person Who Once Loved Me"	Huh Gak	
2012	"Sick" (아프다)	Huh Gak	
2013	"It's Over" (Drama Version)	Speed	
2016	"I'm Fine" (아무렇지 않은 척)	Victon	
2017	"New Face"	Psy	
2018	"Empty Words" (흔한 이별)	Huh Gak	

== Fan meeting ==
Date	Title	City	Country	Venue	Ref.
February 9, 2019	The Naeun Day	Seoul	(South Korea)	Seoul Olympic Hall Muse Live	

== Ambassadorship ==
- Ambassador of the 2022 Busan International Advertising Festival

== Accolades ==
=== Awards and nominations ===
Name of the award ceremony, year presented, category, nominee of the award, and the result of the nomination
Award ceremony	Year	Category	Nominee / Work	Result	Ref.
Korea First Brand Awards	2019	Female CF Model	Son Na-eun	Won	
MBC Drama Awards	2020	Best New Actress	Dinner Mate	Nominated	
MBC Entertainment Awards	2013	Star of the Year	We Got Married (Season 4)	Won	
MBC Entertainment Awards	2013	Best Couple Award	Son Na-eun (with Taemin); We Got Married (Season 4)	Nominated	
MTN Broadcast Advertising Festival	2020	CF Star Award	Son Na-eun	Won	

=== Listicles ===
Name of publisher, year listed, name of listicle, and placement
Publisher	Year	Listicle	Placement	Ref.
Forbes	2019	Korea Power Celebrity	32nd	
