= Park So-dam =

South Korean actress (born 1991)

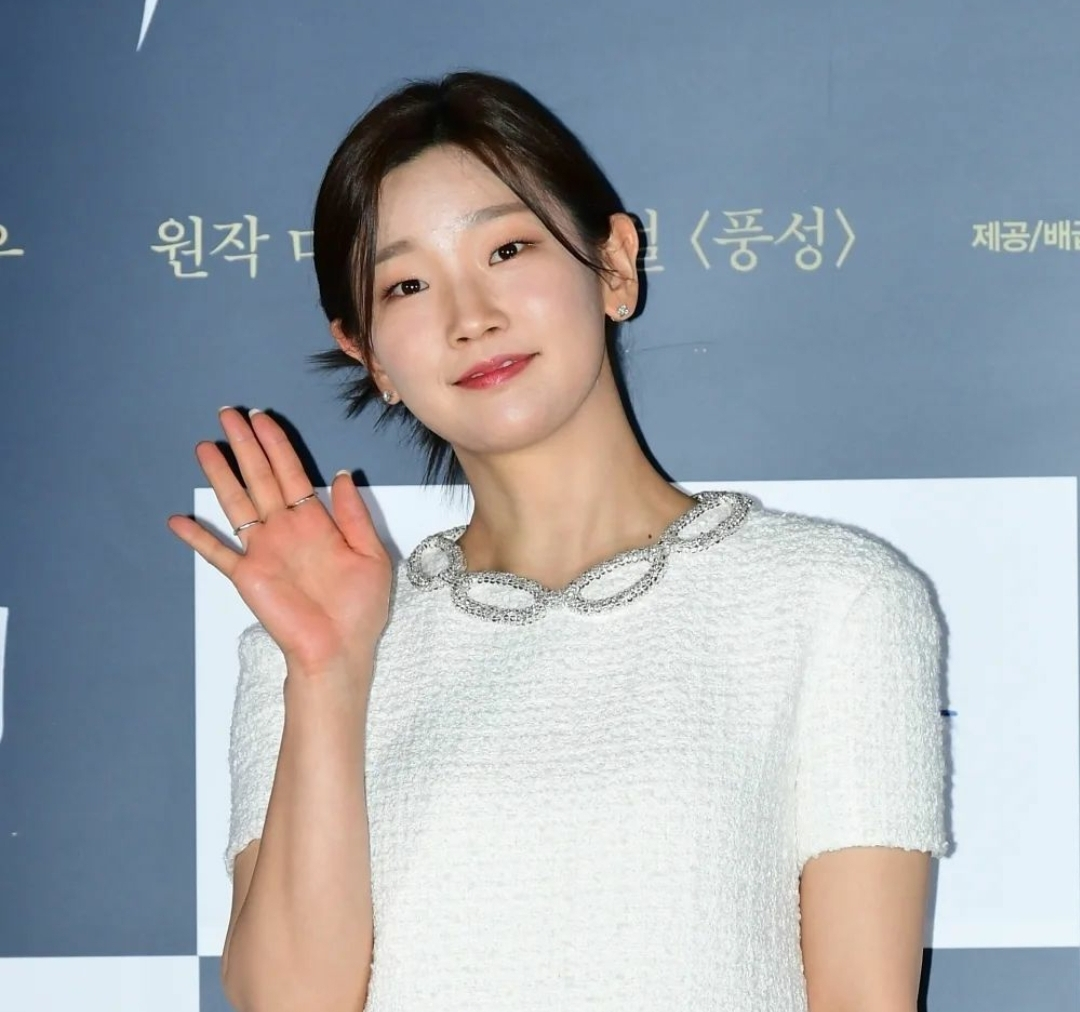
- Park in January 2023
- Born: September 8, 1991 (age 35); Seoul, South Korea
- Education: Korea National University of Arts (BA)
- Occupation: Actress
- Years active: 2013–present
- Agent: The Present Company

Korean name
- Hangul: 박소담
- Hanja: 朴素淡
- RR: Bak Sodam
- MR: Pak Sodam

Park So-dam (Korean: 박소담; born September 8, 1991) is a South Korean actress. She gained recognition through her appearances in the film The Priests (2015) and television series Cinderella with Four Knights (2016), Record of Youth (2020), and Death's Game (2023–2024).

She achieved international fame for her role in the 2019 critically acclaimed dark comedy thriller film Parasite, which won the Palme d'Or at the 2019 Cannes Film Festival and the Academy Award for Best Picture. The actors won the Award for Outstanding Performance by a Cast in a Motion Picture at the 26th Screen Actors Guild Awards.

== Early life and education ==
When Park was in high school, she watched the musical Grease and developed an interest in acting. In 2010, Park enrolled in the School of Drama at Korea National University of Arts. She was a part of the "Legendary Class of 2010," a cohort that included notable peers such as Kim Go-eun and Lee Yoo-young. Actors who are from the same cohort include Ahn Eun-jin, Lee Sang-yi, Kim Sung-cheol, Cha Seo-won, and Lee Hwi-jong.

== Career ==
=== 2013–2016: Early career ===
While in university, Park started her career by turning to independent films after being rejected from around seventeen auditions. Her prolific work in independent cinema, which included eight short films in 2013 alone, earned her the nickname "the Jeon Do-yeon of the short film world." By the end of that year, she had appeared in over 15 short films. Park's work also extended to feature films, starring in the Korean Academy of Film Arts production Ingtoogi: Battle of the Internet Trolls and the indie Steel Cold Winter, the latter of which drew notice when it premiered at the Busan International Film Festival.

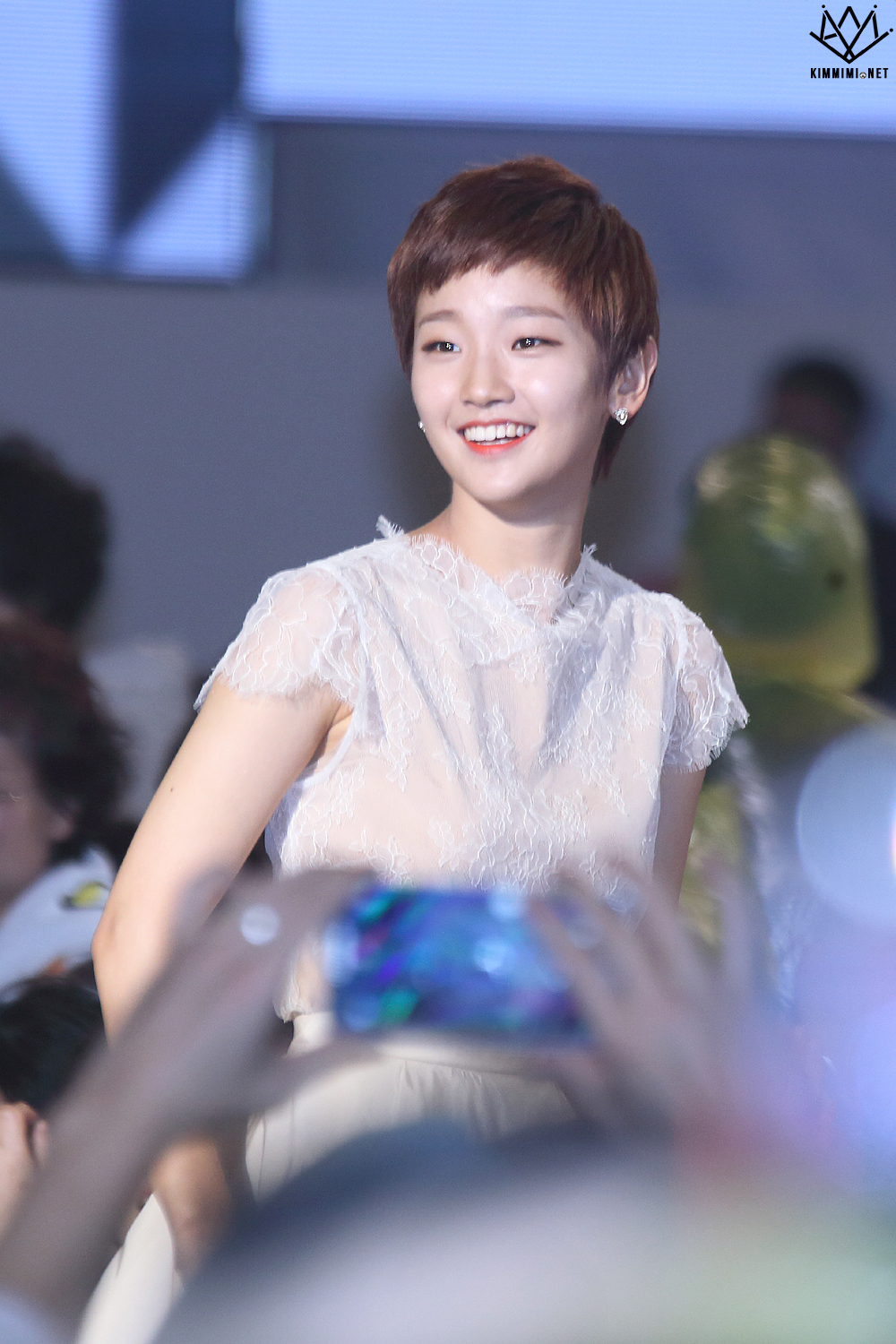
Park at the 20th BIFF in 2015

Park graduated from Korea National University of Arts in February 2014. Park took on small roles in the mainstream films Scarlet Innocence and The Royal Tailor.

She broke into the mainstream in 2015 after making a strong impression with her performance in The Silenced, which nabbed her a win for Best Supporting Actress from the Busan Film Critics Awards. She then featured in box office hits Veteran and The Throne, which led to her casting in the critically acclaimed mystery thriller The Priests. Her role as an evil possessed high school student won her multiple Best New Actress nods and awards.

Park also expanded her filmography to television. She made her debut in OnStyle network's first drama, titled My First Time. Written by Jung Hyun-jung and directed by Lee Jung-hyo, the story follows a group of six young people who gather on a rooftop to escape their problems. Park starred alongside Choi Min-ho, Kim Min-jae, Jung Yoo-jin, Lee Yi-kyung, and Cho Hye-jung. The eight-episode series aired weekly on Wednesdays, starting on October 7, 2015. For her performance, she was nominated for Best New Actress – Television at the 52nd Baeksang Arts Awards.

In 2016, she took the lead role in KBS2's medical drama A Beautiful Mind and tvN's romantic comedy series Cinderella with Four Knights. She then appeared in 2016 revival of the hit play Closer, by Patrick Marber, opposite Bae Seong-woo, Seo Hyun-woo, Kim So-jin, and Kim Seon-ho.

=== 2019–present: Rising popularity through Parasite and career breakthrough ===
In 2019, Park So-dam starred as Ki-jung in Bong Joon-ho's black comedy, Parasite. The film became a global cultural phenomenon, earning the Academy Award for Best Picture and achieving significant box office success in South Korea and internationally. Park's performance as a crafty, whipsmart younger sister of the Kim family was widely praised, with her "Jessica Jingle", a mnemonic, becoming a well-known part of the film. She and the rest of the cast received multiple award nominations for Best Ensemble, and they collectively won the Screen Actors Guild Award for Outstanding Performance by a Cast in a Motion Picture.

Later that year, Park began filming the chase film Special Delivery, with principal photography starting on May 29, 2019. In addition to her film work, she appeared on the tvN variety show Three Meals a Day: Mountain Village along with Yum Jung-ah and Yoon Se-ah.

In 2020, Park was cast in the youth drama Record of Youth as an aspiring makeup artist, co-starring with Park Bo-gum. She also participated in the camping variety show Gamsung Camping with Park Na-rae, Ahn Young-mi, Son Na-eun, Solar. Later that year, she returned to the stage to reprise her role in the play The Student and Mr. Henri, which she had previously performed in 2017.

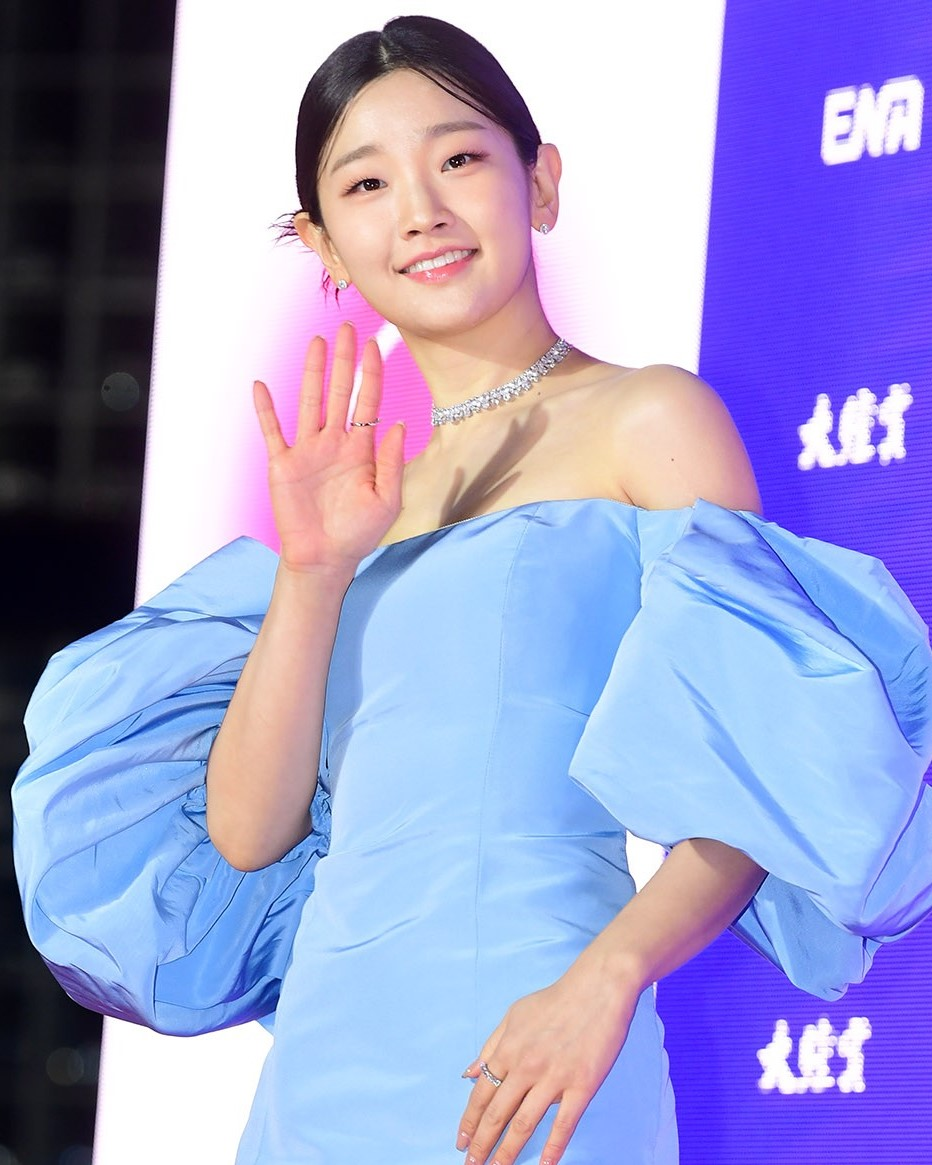
Park at the 58th Grand Bell Awards in 2022

In 2021, Park began filming the spy action film Phantom on January 4, with production concluding on May 21. During the film's post-production phase, she was diagnosed with cancer and took a hiatus from acting to focus on her recovery.

Despite her hiatus, two of her films were released. In 2022, three years after her last film appearance, Park starred as a professional delivery driver in the crime action film Special Delivery. Her performance garnered several Best Actress nominations, including at the Baeksang Arts Awards, the Blue Dragon Film Awards, and the Chunsa Film Art Awards. The following year, she appeared in Lee Hae-young's spy action film Phantom as a Korean secretary to a high-ranking Japanese officer in 1933.

Park returned to acting after her recovery, taking on the female lead role in TVING series Death's Game. She portrayed a mysterious entity known as "Death," who punishes a man for his suicide by forcing him to experience 12 cycles of painful death.

In November 2025, Park part ways with Artist Company after 8 years and signed an exclusive contract with The Present Company.

== Philanthropy ==
In 2016, Park graced the cover of Big Issue's New Year's issue as a talent donation, supporting the organization's mission to help the homeless achieve self-sufficiency. Two years later, she participated in 2018 Ice Bucket Challenge, a fundraising campaign by the ALS Association aimed to build Korea's first Lou Gehrig's Disease Rehabilitation Hospital.

== Personal life ==
In June 2025, it was revealed that Park is the granddaughter of Park Won-sook's cousin.

=== Health ===
On December 13, 2021, it was revealed that Park had been diagnosed with papillary thyroid cancer during a regular health checkup, and underwent surgery. On February 7, 2022, Park's agency confirmed that Park had recently recovered from COVID-19.

== Filmography ==
=== Film ===
Year	Title	Role	Notes	Ref.
2013	Steel Cold Winter	Ji-yeon		
2013	Ingtoogi: The Battle of Internet Trolls	Yeon-hee	Independent film	
2014	The Legacy	Eun-seon		
2014	One on One	Coffee delivery girl		
2014	Scarlet Innocence	Chung-yi's friend	Bit part	
2014	The Royal Tailor	Yoo-wol		
2015	C'est Si Bon	Schoolgirl 1	Bit part	
2015	The Silenced	Hong Yeon-deok		
2015	Veteran	The Youngest		
2015	The Throne	Lady Moon		
2015	The Priests	Lee Young-shin		
2016	Snow Paths	Maria		
2016	Take Off 2	Lee Ji-hye	Cameo	
2017	Man of Will	Han Yeong-hee	Special appearance	
2018	Ode to the Goose	Innkeeper's daughter		
2018	The Underdog	Bamyi	Voice	
2019	Parasite	Kim Ki-jung / Jessica		
2020	Fukuoka	So-dam		
2022	Special Delivery	Eun-ha		
2023	Phantom	Yuriko		
2025	The Journey to Gyeongju	Yeong-ju		

Short film

Year	Title	Role	Notes
2013	No More No Less	Schoolgirl	
2013	Most Ordinary Existence	Su-jin	
2013	Death Theatre	Schoolgirl	
2014	Playgirl	—N/a	
2014	Suzi	Suzi	
2014	Inevitable	Lee Mi-young	
2015	The Vampire Lives Next Door	Na-mi	from omnibus Color of Asia – Masters
2015	Blue Monday's Woman	So-dam	

=== Television series ===
Year	Title	Role	Notes	Ref.
2015	KBS Drama Special: "Red Moon"	Princess Hwawan	Drama special	
2015	My First Time	Han Song-yi		
2016	A Beautiful Mind	Gye Jin-sung		
2016	Cinderella with Four Knights	Eun Ha-won		
2020	Record of Youth	Ahn Jeong-ha		
2023–2024	Death's Game	Death		

=== Television shows ===
Year	Title	Role	Notes	Ref.
2019	Three Meals a Day: Mountain Village	Cast Member	with Yum Jung-ah, Yoon Se-ah	
2020	Gamsung Camping	Cast Member	with Park Na-rae, Ahn Young-mi, Son Na-eun, Solar	

=== Hosting ===
Year	Title	Notes	Ref.
2020	2nd day 34th Golden Disc Awards	with Lee Seung-gi	
2021	1st day 35th Golden Disc Awards	with Lee Seung-gi	
2021	Opening ceremony 26th Busan International Film Festival	with Song Joong-ki	
2023	37th Golden Disc Awards	with Sung Si-kyung, Lee Da-hee and Nichkhun	

=== Radio shows ===
Year	Title	Role	Notes	Ref.
2022	This is Ahn Young-mi, the date muse at two o'clock	Special DJ	October 3–4	

== Theater ==
Year	Title		Role	Venue	Date	Ref.
Year	English	Korean	Role	Venue	Date	Ref.
2016	Let Me In	렛미인	Eli	Seoul Arts Centre CJ Towol Theatre	January 21 to February 28	
2016	The Medici 2016	더 메디치 2016	Herself	Dongdaemun Design Plaza (DDP)	August 27 to 28	
2016	Closer	클로저	Alice Ayres (Jane Jones)	Yegreen Theater	September 6 to November 13, 2016	
2017–2018	The Student and Monsieur Henri	앙리할아버지와 나	Constance Piponnier	Yes 24 Stage 1	Dec 15 to Feb 18	
2018	The Student and Monsieur Henri	앙리할아버지와 나	Constance Piponnier	Seongnam Art Centre Ensemble Theatre	March 16 to 17	
2018	The Student and Monsieur Henri	앙리할아버지와 나	Constance Piponnier	Ulsan Culture and Arts Centre Small Performance Hall	April 20 to 21	
2018	The Student and Monsieur Henri	앙리할아버지와 나	Constance Piponnier	Daejeon Arts Centre Ensemble Hall	May 4 to 5	
2018	The Student and Monsieur Henri	앙리할아버지와 나	Constance Piponnier	Centum City Sohyang Theatre Shinhan Card Hall	May 26 to 27	
2018	The Student and Monsieur Henri	앙리할아버지와 나	Constance Piponnier	Suwon SK Atrium Grand Performance Hall	June 1 to 2	
2020	The Student and Monsieur Henri	앙리할아버지와 나	Constance Piponnier	Hanam Culture and Arts Centre Small Theatre (Arang Hall)	November 6 to 7	
2020	The Student and Monsieur Henri	앙리할아버지와 나	Constance Piponnier	Sejong Gugak Centre	November 13 to 14	
2020–2021	The Student and Monsieur Henri	앙리할아버지와 나	Constance Piponnier	Yes24 Stage 1	December 3 to February 14	
2021	The Student and Monsieur Henri	앙리할아버지와 나	Constance Piponnier	Gyeonggi Art Centre Small Theatre, Suwon	March 27 to 28	
2021	The Student and Monsieur Henri	앙리할아버지와 나	Constance Piponnier	Guri Art Hall Cosmos Grand Theatre, Guri	April 17	
2021	The Student and Monsieur Henri	앙리할아버지와 나	Constance Piponnier	Gimhae Cultural Centre Hani Hall, Gimhae	May 1	
2021	The Student and Monsieur Henri	앙리할아버지와 나	Constance Piponnier	Online	May 31	

== Discography ==
=== Soundtrack appearances ===
Title	Year	Album
"Our Feeling" (Lee Yoon Chan feat. Kim Min-jae, Park So-dam & Lee Yi-kyung)	2015	My First Time OST

== Ambassadorship ==
- Honorary Ambassador for Efficient Tourism in Korea (2021)

== Awards and nominations ==
Name of the award ceremony, year presented, category, nominee of the award, and the result of the nomination
Award ceremony	Year	Category	Nominee / Work	Result	Ref.
APAN Star Awards	2016	Best New Actress	Cinderella with Four Knights	Nominated	
APAN Star Awards	2021	Popular Star Award, Actress	Record of Youth	Nominated	
Asia Artist Awards	2020	Popularity Award (Actress)	Park So-dam	Nominated	
Asian Film Awards	2016	Best Supporting Actress	The Priests	Nominated	
Baeksang Arts Awards	2016	Best New Actress – Television	My First Time	Nominated	
Baeksang Arts Awards	2016	Best New Actress – Film	The Priests	Won	
Baeksang Arts Awards	2020	Best Supporting Actress – Film	Parasite	Nominated	
Baeksang Arts Awards	2022	Best Actress – Film	Special Delivery	Nominated	
Blue Dragon Film Awards	2015	Best New Actress	The Silenced	Nominated	
Blue Dragon Film Awards	2016	Best Supporting Actress	The Priests	Won	
Blue Dragon Film Awards	2019	Best Supporting Actress	Parasite	Nominated	
Blue Dragon Film Awards	2022	Best Actress	Special Delivery	Nominated	
Buil Film Awards	2015	Best New Actress	The Silenced	Nominated	
Buil Film Awards	2016	Best New Actress	The Priests	Nominated	
Buil Film Awards	2016	Best Supporting Actress	The Priests	Won	
Busan Film Critics Awards	2015	Best New Actress	The Silenced	Nominated	
Cine21 Film Awards	2016	Best New Actress	The Priests	Won	
Chunsa Film Art Awards	2016	Best New Actress	The Priests	Won	
Chunsa Film Art Awards	2022	Best Actress	Special Delivery	Nominated	
Critics' Choice Awards	2020	Best Acting Ensemble	Parasite	Nominated	
Grand Bell Awards	2015	Best New Actress	The Silenced	Nominated	
Grand Bell Awards	2022	Best Actress	Special Delivery	Nominated	
Nol Golden Ticket Awards	2016	Best Actress in a Play	Let Me In; Closer	Won	
IndieWire Critics Poll	2019	Best Supporting Actress	Parasite	10th place	
JTBC	2020	Best Chemistry Award	Park So-dam with Solar; Gamsung Camping	Won	
KBS Drama Awards	2016	Best New Actress	A Beautiful Mind	Nominated	
KOFRA Film Awards	2016	Best New Actress	The Priests	Won	
Korean Film Producers Association Awards	2016	Best Supporting Actress	The Priests	Won	
Max Movie Awards	2016	Best New Actress	The Priests	Won	
Max Movie Awards	2016	Rising Star Award	The Priests	Won	
Star Night - Korea Top Star Awards Ceremony	2015	Popular Movie Star	The Priests	Won	
Screen Actors Guild Awards	2020	Outstanding Performance by an Ensemble in a Motion Picture	Parasite	Won	
Women in Film Korea Awards	2015	Best New Actress	The Priests	Won	
