= Romance in the House =

2024 South Korean television series

- Promotional poster
- Hangul: 가족X멜로
- Lit.: Family X Melo
- RR: Gajok X mello
- MR: Kajok X mello
- Genre: Melodrama; Romance; Family
- Written by: Kim Young-yoon
- Directed by: Kim Da-ye
- Starring: Ji Jin-hee; Kim Ji-soo; Son Na-eun; Choi Min-ho
- Music by: Park Se-joon (CP)
- Country of origin: South Korea
- Original language: Korean
- No. of episodes: 12

Production
- Running time: 60 minutes
- Production companies: MI; SLL

Original release
- Network: JTBC
- Release: August 10 – September 15, 2024

Romance in the House (Korean: 가족X멜로) is a 2024 South Korean television series starring Ji Jin-hee, Kim Ji-soo, Son Na-eun and Choi Min-ho. It aired on JTBC from August 10, to September 15, 2024, every Saturday and Sunday at 22:30 (KST). It is also available for streaming on Netflix in selected regions.

== Synopsis ==
Byeon Woo-jin, who got divorced after bankruptcy, returned as a multibillionaire to his family.

== Cast and characters ==
=== Main ===
- Ji Jin-hee as Byeon Moo-jin
- Kim Ji-soo as Geum Ae-yeon
- Son Na-eun as Byeon Mi-rae
- Choi Min-ho as Nam Tae-pyeong
- Yoon San-ha as Byeon Hyeon-jae

=== Supporting ===
- Jung Woong-in as Nam Chi-yeol

The CEO of JPlus Mart. He is Tae-pyeong's father.

- Kim Young-jae as Oh Jae-geol

A tax accountant.

- Shim Wan-joon as Yang Cheol-hong

Mu-jin's alumnus.

==== People around Family Villa ====
- Kim Ki-cheon as Choi Dong-jin
- Jung Suk-yong as Jang Chun-sik
- Hwang Jung-min as Hwang Jin-hee
- Cho Seo-yoon as Jang Eun-woo
- Hwang Bo-ra as Yoo Se-ri
- Kim Do-hyun as Lee Jung-hyeok
- Yang Jo-ah as Ahn Jeong-in
- Lee Kyo-yeop as Kang Nam

== Production ==
=== Development ===
On June 16, 2023, it was stated by Xports News that the series contains melodrama mixed with mysterious elements, written by Kim Young-yoon, the writer of My Secret Romance, and directed by Kim Da-ye. It is scheduled to have 12 episodes.

=== Casting ===
On June 16, 2023, it was reported that Ji Jin-hee, Kim Ji-soo, Son Na-eun, and Choi Min-ho were teaming up and considering to star in the series. The next month, in 2023, Ji, Kim, Son, and Choi confirmed their appearances for the series.

== Release ==
JTBC announced that Romance in the House would air on August 10, 2024, every Saturday and Sunday at 22:30 (KST). Netflix confirmed that the series would exclusively released on their platform.

== Viewership ==
Romance in the House : South Korea viewers per episode (thousands)

Season	Episode number												Average
Season	1	2	3	4	5	6	7	8	9	10	11	12	Average
1	1049	1210	952	1250	763	1246	763	970	663	1010	694	969	962

Source: Audience measurement performed nationwide by Nielsen Korea.

Average TV viewership ratings
Ep.	Original broadcast date	Average audience share (Nielsen Korea)	
Ep.	Original broadcast date	Nationwide	Seoul
1	August 10, 2024	4.786% (1st)	4.495% (1st)
2	August 11, 2024	5.176% (1st)	5.013% (1st)
3	August 17, 2024	3.902% (1st)	3.963% (1st)
4	August 18, 2024	5.326% (1st)	5.365% (1st)
5	August 24, 2024	3.181% (1st)	3.072% (1st)
6	August 25, 2024	5.186% (1st)	5.455% (1st)
7	August 31, 2024	3.345% (1st)	3.147% (1st)
8	September 1, 2024	4.213% (1st)	4.122% (1st)
9	September 7, 2024	2.705% (1st)	2.361% (1st)
10	September 8, 2024	4.072% (1st)	3.738% (1st)
11	September 14, 2024	3.186% (1st)	3.017% (1st)
12	September 15, 2024	4.229% (1st)	4.327% (1st)
Average		4.109%	4.006%
In the table above, the blue numbers represent the lowest ratings and the red numbers represent the highest ratings.; This drama aired on a cable channel/pay TV which normally has a relatively smaller audience compared to free-to-air TV/public broadcasters (KBS, SBS, MBC, and EBS).
