= Special Delivery (2022 film) =

2022 South Korean crime action film

- Theatrical release poster
- Hangul: 특송
- Hanja: 特送
- Lit.: Express Delivery
- RR: Teuksong
- MR: T'ŭksong
- Directed by: Park Dae-min
- Written by: Park Dae-min; Kim Bong-seo; Park Dong-hee
- Produced by: Kim Bong-seo; Seok Dong-jun; Seol Jeong-wook
- Starring: Park So-dam; Song Sae-byeok; Kim Eui-sung; Jung Hyeon-jun; Yeon Woo-jin; Yeom Hye-ran; Han Hyun-min
- Cinematography: Hong Jae-sik
- Edited by: Kim Sun-min
- Music by: Hwang Sang-jun
- Production company: M Pictures
- Distributed by: Next Entertainment World
- Release date: January 12, 2022
- Running time: 108 minutes
- Country: South Korea
- Language: Korean
- Box office: US$3.6 million

Special Delivery (Korean: 특송; RR: Teuksong) is a 2022 South Korean action crime film written and directed by Park Dae-min for M Pictures. Starring Park So-dam, Song Sae-byeok and Kim Eui-sung, it was theatrically released on January 12, 2022. The film was screened at the 51st International Film Festival Rotterdam in the Harbour section.

== Plot ==
Jang Eun-ha is a former North Korean defector-turned-special delivery clerk in Busan who leaves for Seoul to pick up a former baseball player Kim Doo-sik, who is involved in an illegal gambling trade. At the pick-up point, Eun-ha meets Doo-sik's son Kim Seo-won where she along with Seo-won gets chased by Kyeong-pil, a corrupt police officer and also the mastermind behind the gambling trade. Kyeong-pil is after Seo-won as he wants to retrieve a security key to the bank account containing US$30 million, which is in Seo-won's possession. Doo-sik gets killed in the chase while trying to protect Seo-won, where Kyeong-pil frames Eun-ha for Kim Doo-sik's death and Seo-won's abduction. Kyeong-pil's men try to abduct Seo-won, but Eun-ha manages to subdue them after an intense chase.

Meanwhile, Eun-ha travels to Busan and narrates about the incidents to her boss, who later decides to create fake passports for sending Seo-won abroad. While creating passports, Eun-ha's boss gets killed by Kyeong-pil during a fight and Eun-ha attacks Kyeong-pil and his men. Kyeong-pil holds Seo-won at gunpoint where he throws him in the sea and tries to shoot Eun-ha, but Eun-ha stabs Kyeong-pil and drowns with him in the sea. Seo-won is saved, but Eun-ha fakes her death and escapes from the police. Days later, Seo-won gets admitted in an orphanage and school, where he lives his life happily. After school, Seo-won finally meets Eun-ha and they drive to Seo-won's orphanage, but Eun-ha receives a message about a client and tells Seo-won that they should head to a pick-up point, indicating that she still works as a special delivery clerk.

== Cast ==
- Park So-dam as Jang Eun-ha, a delivery driver
- Song Sae-byeok as Jo Kyeong-pil, an investigator chasing after Eun-ha.
- Kim Eui-sung as Baek Kang-cheol, president of Baekgang Industries, a special delivery company
- Jung Hyeon-jun as Kim Seo-won
- Yeon Woo-jin as Kim Doo-sik, a special client, father of Seo-won
- Yeom Hye-ran as Han Mi-young, pursuer of Eun-ha from the National Intelligence Service
- Han Hyun-min as Asif, express vehicle repair expert

=== Special appearance ===
- Yoo Seung-ho
- Jeon Seok-ho
- Choi Deok-moon

== Production ==
Production began on May 29, 2019 with Park So-dam, Song Sae-byeok, Kim Eui-sung and Jung Hyeon-jun confirmed as cast. Park Dae-min was confirmed as director of the crime action film. Park So-dam and Jung Hyeon-jun reunited after 2019 film Parasite. Yeon Woo-jin, Yeom Hye-ran and Han Hyun-min joined the cast in supporting roles. Principal photography began on May 29, 2019 for this chase film. Script reading photos were revealed on June 4.

== Music ==
Original soundtrack of the film was released on January 5, 2022. This is third venture of music director Hwang Sang-joon, for director Park Dae-min after Private Eye (2009) and Seondal: The Man Who Sells the River (2016). The music has been appreciated by the audience who watched the preview.

=== Original soundtrack ===
Special Delivery

Soundtrack album by Hwang Sang-jun (Leadingtone)
- Released: January 5, 2022
- Genre: Soundtrack
- Length: 43:31
- Languages: Korean; English
- Labels: Music & New; Reading Tone; Liway Music & Media Co., Ltd.

Official audio
- Special Delivery - Full Album on YouTube

Released on January 5, 2022
No.	Title	Artist	Length
1.	"Follow You"	Cardigan Club	3:52
2.	"Make Your Money, Shake It"	Black Gatsby	2:54
3.	"Can You Drive?"	Hwang Sang-jun	1:03
4.	"First Express"	Hwang Sang-jun	2:22
5.	"Delivery"	Eunji Park	3:21
6.	"Villain"	Eunji Park	3:05
7.	"No Problem"	Taehyun Lee	3.26
8.	"Speed1"	Hwang Sang-jun	2:01
9.	"Speed2"	Hwang Sang-jun	3:21
10.	"Drop"	Taehyun Lee	3:42
11.	"Villain Ver2"	Eunji Park	2:36
12.	"Smog"	Hwang Sang-jun	4:35
13.	"Parking Lot Action"	Eunji Park	3:37
14.	"My Partner"	Hwang Sang-jun	1:23
15.	"Express Epilogue"	Eunji Park	2:13
Total length:			43:31

== Release ==
The film was scheduled for theatrical release on January 5, 2022, but the date was pushed to a week later to January 12. The film was officially invited in the Harbour section at the 51st International Film Festival Rotterdam, which was held from January 26 to February 6, 2022, and in the competition section at the 24th Udine Far East Film Festival held from April 22 to April 30, 2022. Additionally, it was pre-sold to 47 countries around the world. After its release on January 12 in South Korea, it released in Hong Kong, Singapore and Mongolia on 13 and 14 January, and in Indonesia and Taiwan on 19 and 28 January respectively. It was also invited to the 26th Fantasia International Film Festival and was screened for its North American premiere on July 14, 2022.

The film entered the thriller competition section of the 40th Brussels International Fantastic Film Festival and was screened for Belgian premiere on September 6, 2022.

=== Home media ===
The film was made available for streaming on IPTV (Olleh TV, B TV, LG U+ TV), Home Choice, TVING, Naver TV, WAVVE, Google Play, KT skylife, Cinefox and KakaoPage from February 4, 2022.

== Reception ==
=== Box office ===
The film was released on 995 screens on January 12, 2021. As per Korean Film Council (Kofic) integrated computer network, the film with 233,462 admissions ranked no. 2 on the Korean box office on opening weekend.

As of July 5, 2022, it grossed US$3.25 million along with 443,177 admissions.

=== Critical response ===
Baek Seung-chan of Kyunghyang Shinmun appreciated the performances of Park So-dam and Song Sae-byeok. Comparing the film with the American films Baby Driver (2017) and Drive (2011), Baek stated that the film is fun, and "the scene design that takes advantage of the cultural characteristics of Korea is interesting". However he was critical of the way the film treated children. Concluding he wrote, "Special Delivery easily utilizes the plight of the socially disadvantaged and children as a combination suitable for genre films."

== Accolades ==
Year	Award	Category	Recipient(s)	Result	Ref.
2022	58th Baeksang Arts Awards	Best Actress	Park So-dam	Nominated	
2022	58th Baeksang Arts Awards	Best Technical Award (Martial Arts)	Choi Seong-gyeom	Nominated	
2022	26th Fantasia International Film Festival	Jury's Special Mention	Special Delivery	Won	
2022	Brussels International Fantastic Film Festival	Black Raven	Special Delivery	Nominated	
2022	Chunsa Film Art Awards 2022	Best Actress	Park So-dam	Nominated	
2022	43rd Blue Dragon Film Awards	Best Actress	Park So-dam	Nominated	
2022	58th Grand Bell Awards	Best Actress	Park So-dam	Nominated	
