= Cinderella with Four Knights =

2016 South Korean television series

- Promotional poster
- Also known as: Cinderella and the Four Knights
- Hangul: 신데렐라와 네 명의 기사
- Lit.: Cinderella and Four Knights
- RR: Sinderelrawa ne myeongui gisa
- MR: Sinderellawa ne myŏngŭi kisa
- Genre: Romantic comedy
- Based on: Cinderella and Four Knights by Lee Min-young (Baek Myo)
- Developed by: Studio Dragon
- Written by: Min Ji-eun; Won Young-sil
- Directed by: Kwon Hyuk-chan; Lee Min-woo
- Creative director: Lee Chan-ho
- Starring: Park So-dam; Jung Il-woo; Ahn Jae-hyun; Lee Jung-shin; Choi Min; Son Na-eun
- Country of origin: South Korea
- Original language: Korean
- No. of episodes: 16

Production
- Executive producers: Lee Jung-su; Gwak Geun-su; Kim Mi-ra; Kim Ye-ji
- Production location: South Korea
- Cinematography: Kim Seung-hu; Lee Hyun
- Editor: Bang Su-yeon
- Running time: 60 minutes
- Production company: HB Entertainment

Original release
- Network: tvN
- Release: August 12 – October 1, 2016

Cinderella with Four Knights (Korean: 신데렐라와 네 명의 기사) is a South Korean television series directed by Kwon Hyuk-chan and Lee Min-woo, and starring Park So-dam, Jung Il-woo, Ahn Jae-hyun, Lee Jung-shin, Choi Min, and Son Na-eun. It aired on tvN from August 12 to October 1, 2016.

Based on the web novel with the same title published in 2011, the series is about a group of passionate young people in their 20s who happen to live together. It drew parallels to the 2009 TV series Boys Over Flowers.

== Synopsis ==
Eun Ha-won (Park So-dam) is a bright high school senior who dreams of becoming a teacher. Unfortunately, she loses her mother in a tragic accident. When her father remarries, her cruel stepmother moves in and steals Ha-won's college tuition. She is forced to take on part-time jobs to make payments for her mother's memorial and her college tuition. She meets an older man, chairman of large corporation who convinces her to move into his mansion with his three grandsons who are heirs to his family fortune. Between the rebel-minded loner Kang Ji-woon (Jung Il-woo), playboy money machine Kang Hyun-min (Ahn Jae-hyun) and the super-sweet singer Kang Seo-woo (Lee Jung-shin), Ha-won finds herself in the middle of the hottest love quadrangle to ever befall a modern fairy tale. Rounding out the mansion's chaebol lifestyle are Lee Yoon-sung (Choi Min) who serves as the cousins' handsome bodyguard, and Park Hye-ji (Son Na-eun), a girl who has been neighbors and in love with Hyun-min since childhood.

== Cast ==
=== Main ===
==== Cinderella ====
- Park So-dam as Eun Ha-won

A smart, athletic high school student. Ever since her mother died, she lives a terrible home life because of the ill-treatment from her new stepmother and stepsister. In order to pay for her college tuition, she accepts an invitation to the Sky House and gets entangled with the Kang cousins. She met Kang Ji-woon at their mothers' funerals, giving him her white ribbon hair pin and he gave her his white arm band. Their friendship was a brief one, so they could not recognize each other when reunited after 10 years.

==== The Four Knights ====
- Jung Il-woo as Kang Ji-woon

The middle cousin, who went from an orphan living in poverty to a royalty overnight. Although he seems to be wild and rebellious on the outside, he is soft-hearted, extremely lonely and sensitive on the inside. At first, he tries to get closer to Ha-won in order to protect Hye-ji, who likes Hyun-min. However, as he gets to know Ha-won, he gradually falls in love with her. He originally met Ha-won at his mother's double funeral with Ha-won's mother, and gave words of comfort and his white arm band to her, while she gave him her white ribbon hair pin. It is suggested that their friendship was a brief one as they could not recognize each other when they were reunited after 10 years.

- Ahn Jae-hyun as Kang Hyun-min
  - Jeon Jin-seo as young Kang Hyun-min

The eldest cousin, an arrogant playboy who is used to getting whatever he wants. He firmly believes he can win any woman. At first, he appears to take an interest in Ha-won and pretends to be Ha-won's fiancé. However, he is still in love with Hye-ji, his childhood friend and his dead best friend's sister, but he hides the fact and chose to push her away due to his childhood trauma. As the time comes, he realizes his foolishness for pushing Hye-ji away and apologizes to her for what he did and returns to her, his first true love. He has a troubled relationship with his mother due her constantly pushing him to be Haneul Group's successor, and for abandoning him when he was younger, only coming back to ask about his position.

- Lee Jung-shin as Kang Seo-woo

The youngest cousin, a popular singer-songwriter. He is a sweet, playful guy who is affectionate towards Ha-won whom he starts developing feelings for. He gives up his first love as he gets to know about Ha-won and Ji-woon's relationship. In the finale, it is hinted that he possibly ended up with Ja-yeong.

- Choi Min as Lee Yoon-sung

The secretary of Chairman Kang, and bodyguard to the three Kang cousins and Ha-won. He treats Ha-won well and helps her settle into her new environment at Sky House. He protects Haneul Group by voting against the removal of chairman Kang, going against Chairman Kang's fifth wife, who turns out to be his mother.

==== People around the four Knights ====
- Son Na-eun as Park Hye-ji

A university student majoring in fashion design. She is a childhood friend of Hyun-min, and has liked him since they were kids. She tried using Ji-woon's crush on her to get closer to Hyun-min. She has a genuine and pure heart, but is constantly at battle with it because of Hyun-min constantly pushing her away, especially after her brother's death.

- Kim Yong-gun as Chairman Kang Jong-du

Chairman of Kang Group and the Kang cousins' grandfather. He is the reason behind Ji-woon not having his father present in his life because he forcibly ended his parents' relationship, citing that people from different social classes should not be together. He almost does the same to Ji-woon and Ha-won, but relents and lets the couple be happy, not wanting history to repeat itself.

- Kim Hye-ri as Ji Hwa-ja

Chairman Kang's fifth wife, and the mother of Yoon-sung. She schemed to take over Haneul Group, by taking advantage of Chairman Kang being in coma, and briefly placed her son as CEO of Haneul Group. Her efforts were foiled by Kang Hyun-min convincing enough of the board against removing his grandfather and also secretly by her own son. Chairman Kang divorces her, but relents and starts a relationship with her again.

=== Supporting ===
==== People around Cinderella ====
- Seo Hyun-chul as Eun Gi-sang

Ha-won's father. He works as a dump-truck driver at construction site. After his wife's death, he believed Eun Ha-won to not be his daughter, and thus hated not only her, but her deceased mother as well, therefore kicking her out. His theory was disproved by Kang Young-jin, and he tries to make amends with his daughter again. He also moves his second wife and step-daughter to the same small room that Eun Ha-won slept in at the beginning of the series, as punishment for their cruel treatment of his daughter.

- Choi Eun-kyung as Park Soo-kyung

Ha-won's stepmother. She works at a spa and dreams of getting her daughter rich and famous. She is eventually fired from her job for trying to offer her service as a spy to Madam Kang, in a vain and ill-thought-out plan to have her daughter marry one of the Kang cousins and make her famous.

- Go Bo-gyeol as Choi Yu-na

Ha-won's stepsister. She aims to be a top star one day and marry Kang Hyun-min. Her grades in school were poor, seeing as how she could not get into university, and is lazy and unemployed. She tries to switch her advances to Kang Seo-woo but is rebuffed by him writing in her autograph book to "be nice to Eun Ha-won". She is childish and immature because her mother constantly spoils her and never made her lift a finger to work in her life, and thus relies on her mother for everything.

- Cho Hye-jung as Hong Ja-yeong

Ha-won's best friend who works part-time at the cafe. She met Eun Ha-won when she could not afford food, and Ha won gave her some of her almost expired food. They have been best friends since then. She has a mother who works full-time, and a father who cannot work yet due to recovering from cancer treatment. She is a fan of Kang Seo-woo, and it is hinted that she becomes his girlfriend in the series finale.

=== Others ===
- Jo Mi-ryung
- Kang Eui-sik as Hyun-min's friend
- Kim Sun-woong as Hyun-min's Friend
- Kim Seon-woong as Hyun-min's friend
- Shin Dong-mi as Park Ok-seon, Ha-won's mother

She died before the main events of the series. Ha-won's father believed her to be unfaithful to him, but this was proven to be false. She died alongside Ji-woon's mother, trying to save her. Ji-woon's mother entrusted her with her wedding ring to give to Ji-woon, but this ring ended up being mistakenly given to Ha-won.

- Jin Hye-won as Hye-ji's friend
- Jung Young-joo as housemaid
- Kim Jin-tae
- Jo Kyung-hoon as Ji-woon's boss
- Kim Kang-hyun as Seo-woo's manager
- Lee Ah-hyun as Seo-woo's mother

She is very easy going and somewhat childish, but still loves her son a great deal, and is still very much in love with her deceased husband, Seo-woo's father.

- Son Seon-geun
- Park Kyu-jeom as Director Kim
- Gong Da-im
- Park Hyo-jun as customer in car center
- Kim Kwang-seop
- Jo Eun-suk as Hyun-min's mother

Cold and arrogant, she only cares about her son succeeding Haneul Group, constantly pressuring him to stay as the main heir.

- Gong Jung-hwan as Kang Young-jin

He was mistaken as Ha-Won's biological father, but this turned out to be false. He tried using this false information to his advantage by getting money from Ji-Woon to pay his debt, but was foiled by Ha-won.

- Jin Ju-hyung as Jun-su, Hyun-min's friend
- Na In-woo as Joon Soo, Hyun-min's friend
- Kim Ji-sung as Han Ji-seon, Ji-woon's mother

Deceased before the events of the series; she dies alongside Ha-won's mother and begged Ha-won's mother to give her ring to Ji-woon as her dying wish. She did not let Ji-woon's grandfather know him for fear that he would not be able to love someone without the worry of social status and might be ripped apart like her and Ji-woon's father were.

- Kim Young-jae as Ji-woon's father

He was forcibly separated from Ji-woon's mother by his own father who believed that people of different social classes should not be together. It is believed he died before he could ever find out about his son.

- Kim In-ho as doctor
- Jun Hye-young
- Kim So-hye
- Song Ha-rim
- Kang Seok-ho
- Song Woo-suk
- Kim Su-in
- Seo Han-gyul

=== Special appearances ===
- Moon Se-yoon as a convenience store manager (Ep. 1–2)
- Park Young-soo as Butler Kim (Ep. 1)
- Choi Dae-sung as a man in cloth store (Ep. 1)
- Park Eun-ji as a TV reporter (Ep. 1)
- Seo Bo-ik as a reporter (Ep. 2)
- Chun Yi-seul as Kang Hyun-min's blind date (Ep. 4)
- Park Gwi-sun as a monk (Ep. 6)
- Kim Dong-gyun as a plastic surgery doctor (Ep. 7)
- Hyun Suk-hee as an orphanage's headmaster (Ep. 13)
- Choi Kyu-hwan as Carry Hong, a clothing designer and friend of Hyun-min's who offers Hye-ji a chance to study design in Paris. (Ep. 15-16)

== Filming location ==
The "Sky House" is the clubhouse of the luxury golf resort South Cape Owners Club on the southern coast of Changseon Island in Namhae County in the Southern Gyeongsang Province in South Korea.

== Original soundtrack ==
Cinderella and the Four Knights OST

Soundtrack album by Various artists
- Recorded: 2016
- Genre: Soundtrack
- Languages: Korean; English
- Label: Warner Music Korea

=== Part 1 ===
No.	Title	Artist	Length
1.	"For You"	BTOB	04:19
2.	"For You" (Ballad Ver.)	BTOB	03:58
3.	"For You" (Inst.)		04:19
4.	"For You" (Ballad Ver. Inst.)		03:59
Total length:			16:35

=== Part 2 ===
No.	Title	Artist	Length
1.	"My Romeo"	Jessi	04:01
2.	"My Romeo" (Inst.)		04:01
Total length:			08:02

=== Part 3 ===
No.	Title	Artist	Length
1.	"Confession (고백)" (ft. 시진)	SinB (GFriend)	03:56
2.	"If I Ever See You Again (언젠가 그대 다시 만나면)" (ft. Monet (모네))	Green Cacao (그린 카카오)	04:28
3.	"Confession (고백)" (Inst.)		03:56
4.	"If I Ever See You Again (언젠가 그대 다시 만나면)" (Inst.)		04:28
Total length:			16:48

=== Part 4 ===
No.	Title	Artist	Length
1.	"Without You"	Yoon Bomi (Apink)	04:12
2.	"Without You" (Inst.)		04:12
Total length:			08:24

=== Part 5 ===
No.	Title	Artist	Length
1.	"I Believe"	Younha	03:32
2.	"I Believe" (Inst.)		03:32
Total length:			07:04

=== Part 6 ===
No.	Title	Artist	Length
1.	"Star Fall on You (별이 쏟아지는 너)"	DickPunks	03:28
2.	"Star Fall on You (별이 쏟아지는 너)" (Inst.)		03:28
Total length:			06:56

=== Part 7 ===
No.	Title	Artist	Length
1.	"Only One"	Zia	04:10
2.	"Only One" (Inst.)		04:10
Total length:			08:20

=== Part 8 ===
No.	Title	Artist	Length
1.	"The Way To Find Love (사랑을 찾는 방법)"	CNU (B1A4)	4:18
2.	"The Way To Find Love (사랑을 찾는 방법)" (Inst.)		4:18
Total length:			8:36

=== Part 9 ===
No.	Title	Artists	Length
1.	"Confession (고백)"	Lee Jung-shin	3:59
2.	"Confession (고백)" (Inst.)		3:59

Disc 2:
No.	Title	Artist	Length
1.	"The Chorus Of Knights (Opening Title)"	Oh Joon-Sung	1:40
2.	"Cinderella Story"	Oh Joon-Sung	1:50
3.	"Don't Cry"	Oh Joon-Sung	1:53
4.	"Leave Me Alone"	Oh Joon-Sung	2:29
5.	"Lonely Melody"	Oh Joon-Sung	1:49
6.	"Only for you"	Oh Joon-Sung	1:54
7.	"Pinocchio Dance"	Oh Joon-Sung	2:08
8.	"Pit-A-Pat"	Oh Joon-Sung	1:14
9.	"Protect you"	Oh Joon-Sung	1:40
10.	"Sad Walking"	Oh Joon-Sung	1:38
11.	"Sky Walk"	Oh Joon-Sung	1:48
12.	"Smile Is a blessing"	Oh Joon-Sung	1:43
13.	"Stop the Rain"	Oh Joon-Sung	1:10
14.	"Urban Guy"	Oh Joon-Sung	2:04
15.	"Wondergirl"	Oh Joon-Sung	1:10

== Ratings ==
Ep.	Original broadcast date	Average audience share		
Ep.	Original broadcast date	Nielsen Korea		TNmS
Ep.	Original broadcast date	Nationwide	Seoul	Nationwide
1	August 12, 2016	3.549%	4.548%	3.7%
2	August 13, 2016	1.796%	2.136%	2.5%
3	August 19, 2016	2.680%	3.043%	4.7%
4	August 20, 2016	2.230%	1.913%	2.8%
5	August 26, 2016	2.967%	2.585%	3.8%
6	August 27, 2016	3.903%	4.169%	4.0%
7	September 2, 2016	3.216%	2.855%	4.2%
8	September 3, 2016	3.031%	3.425%	4.0%
9	September 9, 2016	3.036%	2.939%	3.3%
10	September 10, 2016	2.748%	2.883%	3.1%
11	September 16, 2016	2.392%	3.054%	3.0%
12	September 17, 2016	2.009%	1.961%	2.8%
13	September 23, 2016	2.601%	2.430%	3.2%
14	September 24, 2016	2.407%	2.334%	3.2%
15	September 30, 2016	2.456%	2.267%	3.1%
16	October 1, 2016	3.118%	3.132%	3.8%
Average		2.76%	2.85%	3.5%
In the table above, the blue numbers represent the lowest ratings and the red numbers represent the highest ratings.; This series aired on a cable channel/pay TV which normally has a relatively smaller audience compared to free-to-air TV/public broadcasters (KBS, SBS, MBC and EBS).

== Awards and nominations ==
Year	Award	Category	Recipient	Result
2016	5th APAN Star Awards	Best New Actress	Park So-dam	Nominated
2016	9th Korea Drama Awards	Top Excellence Award, Actor	Ahn Jae-hyun	Won
2016	9th Korea Drama Awards	Global Star Award	Ahn Jae-hyun	Won
2016	7th Macau International Television Festival	Best Actor	Ahn Jae-hyun	Won
