= Jung Hyeon-jun =

South Korean actor (born 2011)

- Born: November 8, 2011 (age 14); South Korea
- Occupation: Actor
- Years active: 2016–present
- Agent: T1 Entertainment

Korean name
- Hangul: 정현준
- RR: Jeong Hyeonjun
- MR: Chŏng Hyŏnjun

Jung Hyeon-jun (Korean: 정현준; born November 8, 2011), is a South Korean child actor. He is best known internationally for his role as Park Da-song in the Academy Award-winning film Parasite.

== Filmography ==
=== Film ===
Year	Title	Role	Notes/Ref.
2019	Parasite	Park Da-song	
2022	Special Delivery	Seo-won	

=== Television series ===
Year	Title	Role	Notes/Ref.
2017	You Are Too Much	Yeon Ji-hoon	Minor role
2017	Queen for Seven Days	Lee Yoong's son	Minor role
2018	Through the Waves	young Oh Jung-woo	
2019	Nokdu Flower	young Baek Yi-hyun	
2019	At Eighteen	young Choi Joon-woo	
2019	Vagabond	young Cha Hoon	
2020	Dr. Romantic 2	Lee Dong-woo's son	Minor role, episode 13
2020	The King: Eternal Monarch	young Lee Gon	
2021	Sisyphus: The Myth	young Han Tae-sul	
2021	Mine	Han Ha-joon, Hee-soo's stepson	
2021	Beyond Evil	young Han Joo-won	
2021	Voice	young Derek Jo	Season 4
2021–2022	Moonshine	young Nam Young	
2022	Bad Prosecutor	young Jin Jeong	
2023	See You in My 19th Life	young Moon Seo-ha	
2023	Twinkling Watermelon	young Eun-gyeol	

== Awards and nominations ==
Year	Award	Category	Nominated work	Result
2020	2020 Gold Derby Awards	Best Ensemble	Parasite	Won
2020	26th Screen Actors Guild Awards	Outstanding Performance by a Cast in a Motion Picture	Parasite	Won
2022	2022 KBS Drama Awards	Best Young Actor	Bad Prosecutor	Nominated
