= Gamsung Camping =

2020–2021 South Korean television show

- Promotional poster
- Also known as: Camping Vibes
- Hangul: 갬성캠핑
- RR: Gaemseongkaemping
- MR: Kaemsŏngk'aemp'ing
- Genre: Reality show Travel documentary
- Starring: Park Na-rae; Ahn Young-mi; Park So-dam; Son Na-eun; Solar
- Country of origin: South Korea
- Original language: Korean
- No. of seasons: 1
- No. of episodes: 12

Production
- Running time: 115 minutes

Original release
- Network: JTBC
- Release: October 13, 2020 – January 8, 2021

Gamsung Camping (Korean: 갬성캠핑) is a South Korean variety show program on JTBC starring Park Na-rae, Ahn Young-mi, Park So-dam, Son Na-eun, and Solar. The show airs on JTBC starting October 13, 2020. It was broadcast by JTBC on Tuesday at 23:00 (KST).

Broadcast timing has moved to Fridays at 21:00 (KST) from November 20, 2020.

== Synopsis ==
This is a camping entertainment program where female stars who want to travel can enjoy 2 days and 1 night on vacation in Korea.

== Casts ==
- Park Na-rae
- Ahn Young-mi
- Park So-dam
- Son Na-eun
- Solar

== Episodes ==
Ep.	Original broadcast date	Concept	Travel location	Guest(s)	Ref.
1	October 13, 2020	Switzerland	Sangsang Yangtte Farm (Namhae County, South Gyeongsang Province)	Song Seung-heon	
1	October 13, 2020	Switzerland	Gosari Hill (Changseon-myeon, Namhae County, South Gyeongsang Province)	Song Seung-heon	
2	October 20, 2020	Vietnam	Dumo Village (Namhae County, South Gyeongsang Province)	Song Seung-heon	
3	October 27, 2020	Canada	Pyeongchang County, Gangwon Province	Lee Sang-yoon; Jo Dal-Hwan	
3	October 27, 2020	Canada	Jeongseon County, Gangwon Province	Lee Sang-yoon; Jo Dal-Hwan	
4	November 3, 2020	Finland	Dorongi Pond (Jeongseon County, Gangwon Province)	Lee Sang-yoon; Jo Dal-Hwan	
5	November 20, 2020	United States	Pocheon Hantan River Sky Bridge (Pocheon, Gyeonggi Province)	Lee Min-jung	
5	November 20, 2020	United States	Hwajeokyeon (Changseon-myeon, Namhae County, South Gyeongsang Province)	Lee Min-jung	
6	November 27, 2020	Greece	Bidulginangpokpo Falls (Pocheon, Gyeonggi Province)	Lee Min-jung	
6	November 27, 2020	Greece	Gukmangbong Peak - Jangam Reservoir (Pocheon, Gyeonggi Province)	Lee Min-jung	
7	December 4, 2020	Italy	Yonghwa Beach (Samcheok, Gangwon Province)	Cha Tae-hyun	
8	December 11, 2020	Memory Trip Gamsung	Jangho Beach (Samcheok, Gangwon Province)	Cha Tae-hyun	
8	December 11, 2020	Memory Trip Gamsung	Jangho Beach (Samcheok, Gangwon Province)	Kwak Si-yang	
9	December 18, 2020	Mexico	Taean Sinduri Coastal Dune (Taean County, South Chungcheong Province)	Yoon Kyun-sang; Yang Se-chan; Han Yoon-seo	
9	December 18, 2020	Mexico	Anmyeon Kart Cheheomjang (Taean County, South Chungcheong Province)	Yoon Kyun-sang; Yang Se-chan; Han Yoon-seo	
10	December 25, 2020	Christmas Day	Taean Sinduri Coastal Dune (Taean County, South Chungcheong Province)	Yoon Kyun-sang; Yang Se-chan; Han Yoon-seo	
10	December 25, 2020	Christmas Day	Taean Sinduri Coastal Dune (Taean County, South Chungcheong Province)	Yang Se-hyung	
11	January 1, 2021	Hawaii	Jeju Island, Jeju Province	Eun Ji Won Mino	
12	January 8, 2021	New Zealand	Jeju Island, Jeju Province	Eun Ji Won Mino	

== Ratings ==
Average TV viewership ratings
Ep.	Original broadcast date	Average audience share (Nielsen Korea)
1	October 13, 2020	1.8%
2	October 20, 2020	1.1%
3	October 27, 2020	1.3%
4	November 3, 2020	1.1%
5	November 20, 2020	1.8%
6	November 27, 2020	1.2%
7	December 4, 2020	1.7%
8	December 11, 2020	1.6%
9	December 18, 2020	1.5%
10	December 25, 2020	2.3%
11	January 1, 2021	2.3%
12	January 8, 2021	1.1%
Average		1.6%
The blue numbers represent the lowest ratings and the red numbers represent the highest ratings.

== International broadcast ==
- In Indonesia, Gamsung Camping is available for streaming online via Viu.
