= Death's Game =

2023–2024 South Korean television series

- Promotional poster
- Hangul: 이재, 곧 죽습니다
- Lit.: Yi-jae Will Die Soon
- RR: Ijae, got jukseumnida
- MR: Ijae, kot chuksŭmnida
- Genre: Fantasy; Anthology; Mystery; Thriller
- Based on: Death's Game by: Lee Won-sik; Ggulchan
- Written by: Ha Byung-hoon
- Directed by: Ha Byung-hoon
- Starring: Seo In-guk; Park So-dam
- Music by: Park Sung-il
- Ending theme: "Even If There's No Miracle" by Seo In-guk
- Country of origin: South Korea
- Original language: Korean
- No. of episodes: 8

Production
- Executive producer: Lee Ye-seul
- Producers: Kim So-jung; Kwon Mi-kyung; Lee So-young; Chu Joon-sik; Kim Ji-young
- Cinematography: Kim Jung-won; Lee Eui-yeol
- Editor: Park Hyun-jung
- Running time: 38–64 minutes
- Production companies: SLL; Studio N; Saram Entertainment
- Budget: ₩3.35 billion (for VFX)

Original release
- Network: TVING
- Release: December 15, 2023 – January 5, 2024

Death's Game (Korean: 이재, 곧 죽습니다 (Note: The revised romanization word "I-jae" is a homonym for the Korean word "이제", which means "now". Because of this, the title carries two simultaneous meanings: Yee-jae Will Die Soon (referring to the character's fate) and Now, You Will Die Soon (A direct threat or statement of fact about the cycle of death).)) is a 2023–2024 South Korean fantasy anthology television series written and directed by Ha Byung-hoon. Based on a webtoon of the same name by Lee Won-sik and Ggulchan, the series follows Choi Yee-jae (Seo In-guk), a man who dies by suicide after losing hope. He is subsequently punished by Death (Park So-dam), an entity who forces him to experience 12 cycles of reincarnation and death. If Yee-jae can survive the imminent death of any host, he earns the right to live out that life. It was released on TVING from December 15, 2023 to January 5, 2024, and is also available for streaming on Amazon Prime Video in selected regions except South Korea and China.

Death's Game received generally positive reviews, with critics praising its high production values and philosophical depth, though some noted a reliance on spectacle and a simplified approach to mental health. It also received a nominations for Best OTT Original and Visual Effects at the 2024 Asia Contents Awards & Global OTT Awards, and listed as ninth Best K-Dramas of 2024 by Time Magazine.

== Synopsis ==
Death's Game centers on Choi Yee-jae, a young man who attempts suicide after struggling to find a job for seven years, losing all money to a fraudulent investment, and being kicked out of his apartment. Death, however, is offended by Yee-jae's suicide note and his view of death as a tool to escape from pain. Death chooses to punish him by forcing him to play a game in which he must reincarnate and die 12 times before being sent to hell. The rule is that if he manages to survive in any of the 12 incarnations, he will be able to continue living in that reincarnation. The game helps him acknowledge the power of death, understand the differences in each person's fate and life, and teaches him profound lessons about the value of life.

== Cast ==
=== Main ===
- Seo In-guk as Choi Yee-jae

A man who lost his will to live after repeatedly failing to find a job for seven years.

- Park So-dam as Death

A mysterious being, in the form of a woman, who condemns Yee-jae to 12 cycles of death and reincarnation before falling into hell.

=== Supporting ===
==== Choi Yee-jae's reincarnation ====
- Choi Si-won as Park Jin-tae

A 33-year-old second son and successor of Taekang Group.

- Sung Hoon as Song Jae-seop

A 38-year-old extreme sports athlete.

- Kim Kang-hoon as Kwon Hyeok-su

A 17-year-old high school student who's a school bullies' target.

- Jang Seung-jo as Lee Ju-hun

A 35-year-old secret organization fixer who solves any client's request.

- Lee Jae-wook as Cho Tae-sang

A 21-year-old aspiring mixed martial arts fighter who gave up his dream due to his family's circumstances and being imprisoned for some reason.

- Lee Do-hyun as Jang Geon-u

A 24-year-old handsome model and heartthrob who catches everyone's attention wherever he goes.

- Kim Jae-wook as Jeong Gyu-cheol

A 34-year-old serial killer and mysterious painter who was born in an ordinary family.

- Oh Jung-se as An Ji-hyeong

A 42-year-old detective who wanted to become a great police officer like his father.

- Kim Won-hae as a homeless man

==== Others ====
- Kim Ji-hoon as Park Tae-woo

The serial killer and the first son and CEO of Taekang Group.

- Go Youn-jung as Lee Ji-su

A novelist who has been in a relationship with Yee-jae since they were college students.

- Yoo In-soo as Lee Jin-sang

Hyeok-su's classmate and a school bully.

- Kim Mi-kyung as Yee-jae's mother

A single mom who loses her husband and raises Yee-jae on her own. Also, Yee-jae's final reincarnation, where he learns the pain and suffering of his mother for losing her only son.

- Choi Woo-jin as Woo Ji-hun

A homicide detective and Ji-hyung's junior.

- Oh Ji-yul as Woo Seul-gi

Ji-hun's daughter.

=== Extended ===
- Nam Kyung-eup as Chairman Park

Tae-woo and Jin-tae's father, and the founder of Taekang Group.

- Kim Geon-ho as an office worker / Yee-jae's 11th reincarnation (Note: A scene in the drama reveals his name as Lee Jung-kook.)
- Kim Ha-eon as young Jin-tae
- Jung Min-joon as young Tae-u
- Kim Beop-rae as Boss
- Jeon Seung-hoon as Na Tae-seok
- Seo In-geol as Kim Seong-hyeop
- Seo Woo-hyeok as Han Jun-sang
- Bae Gang-hee as Kim Eun-jae
- Han Ye-ji as Park Min-ji
- Lim Ji-gyu as Mr. Kim

Tae-u's right-hand man.

- Jung Yong-ju as Kim Ji-yeong
- Bae Ji-won as Kim Jin-u
- Kim Han-sol as young Yi-jae

=== Special appearances ===
- Kim Sung-cheol as Kim Hyeon-su
- Ryeoun as the youngest PD

== Episodes ==
Part	Episodes	Originally released
1	4	December 15, 2023
2	4	January 5, 2024

No.	Title	Directed by	Written by	Original release date
Part 1
1	"Death"; Transliteration: "Jugeum" (Korean: 죽음)	Ha Byung-hoon	Ha Byung-hoon	December 15, 2023
Choi Yee-jae is on the way to his final interview at Taekang Group before graduating, but his life changes after a man dies in front of him. After struggling through seven years of job hunting, Yee-jae finally decides to end his own life and jump from a building. He awakes in another person's body, who is sitting on a luxurious plane, and encounters a mysterious being called "Death." Feeling insulted by Yee-jae's suicide note, Death punishes him to die 12 times. For each of these deaths, he will inhabit the bodies of individuals facing imminent death. If he prevents the death of the body he enters, he can live with it for the rest of his life. Yee-jae refuses to live again, but a floating orb appears, and it transfers the memories and abilities of the original owner's body to him. Yee-jae decides to live again after viewing Park Jin-tae's memories, who is a chaebol heir of the Taekang Group. However, the plane explodes and Jin-tae dies. Yee-jae then enters Song Jae-seop's body, who participated in a parachute-free land challenge with a 3 billion won reward but dies upon landing.
2	"The Reason You're Going to Hell"; Transliteration: "Jioge ganeun iyu" (Korean: 지옥에 가는 이유)	Ha Byung-hoon	Ha Byung-hoon	December 15, 2023
Yee-jae enters Kwon Hyeok-su's body, a high school student who is being relentlessly bullied by Lee Jin-sang. As he finds a way to survive, he returns to Hyeok-su's house and suddenly remembers his own mother. He remembers that in his own life, he just wanted to have a job, get married, and start a family like everyone else. He successfully turns Jin-sang into an outcast. However, Jin-sang then attacks Hyeok-su by killing him with a brick. Yee-jae then enters Lee Ju-hun's body, who is captured after stealing the boss' money but escapes using a motorbike. The organization hunts for Ju-hun.
3	"Death Can't Take Anything Away."; Transliteration: "Jugeumeun amugeotdo gajyeogaji mothanda." (Korean: 죽음은 아무것도 가져가지 못한다.)	Ha Byung-hoon	Ha Byung-hoon	December 15, 2023
As Ju-hun, Yee-jae manages to survive and escapes the manhunt. He meets up with Ju-hun's lover and plans to elope with her and the money. However, the lover betrays him and shoots him in the head. Yee-jae fails to escape death for the fourth time. Yee-jae is reincarnated as Cho Tae-sang, a former mixed martial arts fighter who was jailed for allegedly causing a fatal traffic accident. However, Tae-sang was not the real culprit and was only accepting a plea deal to take the blame for someone else in exchange for money. Coincidentally, one of Tae-sang's cellmates is Lee Jin-sang, the bully who had previously murdered Yee-jae's past incarnation, Hyeok-su. Tae-sang goes on to successfully exact his revenge on Jin-sang. However, after Tae-sang threatens to expose the truth, prisoners are bribed to attempt to murder Tae-sang. He manages to survive and is released four days after Yee-jae enters his body. Upon his release, however, Tae-sang is killed by his cellmate, who was also secretly paid to kill him. Thus, Yee-jae fails to evade death for the fifth time. In his sixth life, Yee-jae wakes up as a five-month-old baby.
4	"The Reason You're Afraid of Death"; Transliteration: "Jugeumi duryeoun iyu" (Korean: 죽음이 두려운 이유)	Ha Byung-hoon	Ha Byung-hoon	December 15, 2023
Yee-jae, as a baby, is murdered by his parents through neglect and abuse. He then enters his seventh life: that of the famous and handsome model named Jang Geon-u. He recovers the embezzled money that Ju-hun stole from his boss. At the coffee shop, Yee-jae reunites with his first love, Lee Ji-su, now a novelist. Ji-su published an award-winning novel based on their romantic relationship, despite the fact that they broke up in reality. He came to realize that Ji-su still loves him and laments both their breakup and his decision to commit suicide. He also sees that his mother and Ji-su are grieving his death. Yee-jae tells Ji-su his true identity and that his stories of reincarnations and deaths are true. His confession is interrupted by a car running them both over and killing them, while also seriously injuring Geon-u. The driver turns out to be Jin-tae's brother and Taekang Group CEO Park Tae-u, who is connected to him and the four bodies he entered. After Tae-u kills him, Yee-jae reawakens again in purgatory. He swears revenge against Tae-u. He confronts Death and aims a gun at its forehead, and a gunshot is heard.
Part 2
5	"It Is Impossible to Break Free and Fight against Death."; Transliteration: "Jugeumui teureul kkaego jugeumgwa ssauneun geon bulganeunghada." (Korean: 죽음의 틀을 깨고 죽음과 싸우는 건 불가능하다.)	Ha Byung-hoon	Ha Byung-hoon	January 5, 2024
Death does not die from the gunshot and mocks Yee-jae, who mourns Ji-soo, who was destined to die in Tae-u's hands during the car crash. Yee-jae plans to kill Tae-u to avenge Ji-soo, but Death warns him that if he commits murder, he will go to hell. Yee-jae is reborn as Jeong Gyu-cheol, a talented painter and serial killer who murdered 15 people and used their blood in his art. When Tae-u offers to buy him a new painting, Yee-jae sees it as an opportunity to get closer to Tae-u. He lures Tae-u to Gyu-cheol's mansion and art studio, intending to kill and dismember him in Gyu-cheol's typical manner. Due to Gyu-cheol's brain tumor, however, Yee-jae faints and is tied to a table bed, where Tae-u brutally cuts off his limbs before killing him. Death mocks Yee-jae for suffering the most brutal death he has experienced so far. Yee-jae laughs and reveals that he had secretly filmed the murder of Gyu-cheol as evidence to bring down Tae-u.
6	"Memory"; Transliteration: "Gieok" (Korean: 기억)	Ha Byung-hoon	Ha Byung-hoon	January 5, 2024
Yee-jae's ninth incarnation is An Ji-hyeong, a police detective. Ji-hyeong, like Ji-hyeong's father, aspired to be a great policeman. However, he prioritized his life over his duty, leading to his colleagues' disapproval. Yee-jae, as Ji-hyeong, arrests Tae-sang's murderer and is praised by the public. Yee-jae goes to Gyu-cheol's mansion to collect evidence on both the murder of Gyu-cheol as well as Gyu-cheol's murders. Yee-jae approaches Tae-u and promises to bring him to justice, but the director of a TV station covers up the truth. Tae-u surrenders himself for killing Gyu-cheol; he lies about being a survivor of the serial killer. After Tae-u is released due to a lack of evidence, Yee-jae exposes all of Tae-u's crimes with the evidence he gathered using his past memories. He then sends Tae-u on an exploding plane, just like how he killed his younger brother Jin-tae, but gives him a chance to survive by using a parachute. As Yee-jae is about to suffocate Tae-u to death, he is stopped by Ji-su's memories. Yee-jae decides to just leave, but Tae-u tries to kill Yee-jae before a truck crashes into him.
7	"Opportunity"; Transliteration: "Gihwi" (Korean: 기회)	Ha Byung-hoon	Ha Byung-hoon	January 5, 2024
Tae-u loses his legs and is in a half-vegetative state due to the truck accident. As revenge, Yee-jae exposes Tae-u's crimes and arrests those who helped cover them up. Yee-jae then lives as Ji-hyeong for a few months before sacrificing himself to save a colleague. He is reborn as a homeless man and attends the funeral of Ji-hyeong, who is hailed as a hero. Yee-jae falls into despair before he accidentally falls off a flight of stairs and dies again. Afterwards, Yee-jae becomes an ordinary office worker—the same person he witnessed dying seven years ago. After dying, Yee-jae faces Death, who tells him he has one final life left. Yee-jae decides to end his life and go to hell. After Death fires the last bullet, Yee-jae reawakens and to his horror, he finds himself reborn as his mother.
8	"Don't Go Looking For Death. Death Will Come Find You."; Transliteration: "Jugeumeul chatji malla. Jugeumi dangsineul chajeul geosida." (Korean: 죽음을 찾지 말라. 죽음이 당신을 찾을 것이다.)	Ha Byung-hoon	Ha Byung-hoon	January 5, 2024
Yee-jae becomes hysterical after seeing his mother's memories, including her heartbreak over his death. He realizes the pain that his suicide has caused her. He also realizes that this is what Death is trying to make him understand—that his suicide caused pain and suffering for his loved ones. Yee-jae learns about his mother's resilience despite her difficult times and her regret for not being a better mother. He feels remorse for his actions. Yee-jae decides to go hiking on a mountain where his mother and late father used to go when they were young. There, he experiences an accident but survives it. He lives for 32 years in his mother's body before finally dying a peaceful death. Upon reuniting with Death, Yee-jae asks for another chance to live again as himself to compensate for the suffering his mother endured. Seeing how he had avoided suicide, Death agrees to allow him to live as Yee-jae again and declares that his punishment is over. The story ends with Yee-jae standing on the same building where he once jumped to his death and accepting a phone call that he had originally missed from his mother.

== Production ==
=== Development ===
Developed under the working title I'm Going to Die Soon (이제 곧 죽습니다; Ije got jukseumnida), Death's Game was written and directed by Ha Byung-hoon, who previously worked on dramas like Go Back (2017) and 18 Again (2020). He based the drama on the webtoon of the same name by Lee Won-sik and Ggulchan. SLL, Studio N and Saram Entertainment co-managed the series' production. It was supposed to be a JTBC drama and would air on the network, and stream through TVING.

On January 13, 2023, it was announced by director Ha that the production would be in the final casting and filming would begin as early as February and last for about six months.

On May 31, 2023, Dexter Studios announced that they received an order for the VFX technology of the series with a total budget of ₩3.35 billion. (Note: The total value of the contract is ₩3.35 billion, including ₩1.35 million for pre-production and ₩3.2 billion for the main contract.) The period of contract was from May 31, 2023, to January 31, 2024. A representative said, "Visual special effects would be widely used in various scenes as the main character is placed in different environments and conditions each time he lives 12 lives," adding, "the delicate technology would contribute to the drama's fantasy elements and mysterious atmosphere."

=== Casting ===
The role of Choi Yi-jae was first offered to Kang Ha-neul.

Seo In-guk and Park So-dam were cast for the main roles of the series in January 2023, and officially confirmed the next month. On February 21, Joy News 24 reported that the actors conducted a full script reading on the 14th and Seo started to film on the 20th. It also marks Park's small screen comeback since tvN's Record of Youth in 2020, as she took a hiatus to recover from papillary thyroid cancer.

On August 4, 2023, TVING released a video of the star-studded lineup cast namely Seo, Park, Kim Ji-hoon, Choi Si-won, Sung Hoon, Kim Kang-hoon, Jang Seung-jo, Lee Jae-wook, Lee Do-hyun, Go Youn-jung, Kim Jae-wook, and Oh Jung-se.

== Original soundtrack ==
Studio Curiousity's Park Sung-il led the series' soundtrack as the music director.

=== Album ===
Death's Game

Soundtrack album by Various artists
- Released: January 11, 2024
- Length: 85:29
- Language: Korean
- Label: Vlending Inc.

Singles from Death's Game
- 1. "It's a Lie" Released: November 29, 2023; 2. "Even If There's No Miracle" Released: December 15, 2023; 3. "A Day's Greeting" Released: January 5, 2024

Death's Game soundtrack album was released on January 11, 2024; it contains all of the singles and background tracks from the series.

==== Track listing ====
No.	Title	Lyrics	Music	Artist	Length
1.	"Even If There's No Miracle" (기적은 없어도)	Seo Dong-sung	Park Sung-il	Seo In-guk	4:00
2.	"It's a Lie" (거짓말인데)	Seo Dong-sung	Park Sung-il	Sondia	3:34
3.	"A Day's Greeting" (오늘이 하는 말)	Lee Chi-hoon	Park Sung-il	Sondia	4:54
4.	"Guilty of Coming to Find Death" (죽음은 먼저 찾아온 죄)		Sim Hyung-bo		2:50
5.	"Main Theme of Death's Game"		Park Sung-il		2:45
6.	"Death's Game" (이재, 곧 죽습니다)		Park Sung-il		2:41
7.	"The Orb of Memory" (기억의 구슬)		Judah Earl		2:06
8.	"A Death by Design" (계획된 죽음)		Sim Hyung-bo		3:21
9.	"Ephemeral Symphony" (한 번의 삶)		Park Sung-il		3:19
10.	"Death is Merely a Means to End My Pain" (죽음은 그저 내 고통을 끝낼 도구에 불과하다)		Sim Hyung-bo		3:13
11.	"Self-Imposed Punishment" (스스로에게 내린 벌)		Lee Sang-min		2:31
12.	"We Begin the Hunt" (사냥을 시작한다)		Judah Earl		2:30
13.	"The Dog That Bit his Master" (주인을 배신한 개)		Kim Sung-jong		2:31
14.	"Devil vs Devil" (악마 vs 악마)		Kim Yoo-kyung		3:07
15.	"The Origin of All Deaths" (모든 죽음의 시작)		Sim Hyung-bo		3:13
16.	"Those Left Behind" (남겨진 사람들)		Judah Earl		3:11
17.	"Inception of Revenge" (복수의 시작)		Lee Sang-min		4:33
18.	"A Day Where Nothing Goes Right" (되는 게 하나도 없는 날)		Kim Yoo-kyung		3:07
19.	"Multiple Lives" (여러 개의 목숨)		Lee Sang-min		3:30
20.	"Shadow of Death" (죽음의 그림자)		Sim Hyung-bo		3:27
21.	"The Devil to Kill a Devil" (악마로 악마를 죽인다)		Sim Hyung-bo		2:44
22.	"The Hidden Truth of Linked Deaths" (연결된 죽음의 실체)		Lee Sang-min		4:35
23.	"An Eye for an Eye" (눈에는 눈)		Lee Sang-min		3:10
24.	"Living in Fear Isn't Real Life" (두려움에 떠는 인생은 지짜 인생이 아니다)		Judah Earl; Jeremiah Earl		3:06
25.	"1201"		Kim Yoo-kyung		3:08
26.	"The Way to Escape Death" (죽음을 벗어나는 방법)		Judah Earl		2:30
27.	"To You in the Future" (미래의 너에게)		Park Sung-il		1:53
Total length:					85:29

==== Chart performance ====
Weekly charts
Chart (2024)	Peak position
South Korean Albums (Circle)	89

=== Singles ===
Singles included on the album were released from November 29, 2023, to January 5, 2024.

Part 1–3

Part 1

Released on November 29, 2023
No.	Title	Lyrics	Music	Artist	Length
1.	"It's a Lie" (거짓말인데)	Seo Dong-sung	Park Sung-il	Sondia	3:34
2.	"It's a Lie" (거짓말인데; Inst.)		Park Sung-il		3:34
Total length:					7:08

Part 2

Released on December 15, 2023
No.	Title	Lyrics	Music	Artist	Length
1.	"Even If There's No Miracle" (기적은 없어도)	Seo Dong-sung	Park Sung-il	Seo In-guk	4:00
2.	"Even If There's No Miracle" (기적은 없어도; Inst.)		Park Sung-il		4:00
Total length:					8:00

Part 3

Released on January 5, 2024
No.	Title	Lyrics	Music	Artist	Length
1.	"A Day's Greeting" (오늘이 하는 말)	Lee Chi-hoon	Park Sung-il	Sondia	4:54
2.	"A Day's Greeting" (오늘이 하는 말; Inst.)		Park Sung-il		4:54
Total length:					9:48

==== Chart performance ====
List of singles, showing year released, with selected chart positions and notes
Title	Year	Peak chart positions	Notes
Title	Year	KOR Down.	Notes
"It's a Lie" (Sondia)	2023	181	Part 1
"Even If There's No Miracle" (Seo In-guk)	2023	116	Part 2
"A Day's Greeting" (Sondia)	2024	182	Part 3

== Release ==
TVING confirmed the release date of Death's Game would be on December 15, 2023. On November 18, 2023, it was announced that the series would be available to stream through Amazon Prime Video in 240 countries and territories except China and South Korea.

The series was divided into two parts: Part 1 was released on December 15, 2023, with first four episodes while Part 2 was released on January 5, 2024, with the remaining four episodes at 12:00 (KST).

== Reception ==
=== Critical response ===
Writing for the first half of the series, Cine21's Kim Hyun-seung noted that while many South Korean works like Along with the Gods have explored the afterlife, the "worldview built by Death's Game is quite novel". Kim lauded the series for visual effects (CG) rarely seen in domestic productions, though he expressed disappointment that the narrative occasionally relied too heavily on these effects. While Cine21's Evaluating the second half, Nam Ji-woo observed that the show successfully "transforms into a contemplative drama" that attempts to address the complex philosophical questions of suicide in a unique manner.

International critics also highlighted the show's generic fluidity. Jasneet Singh of Collider noted that while the high-concept premise of 12 lives is the initial hook, the "revenge storyline woven between its emotional folds" provides the series with its narrative heart and drive. Pierce Conran of South China Morning Post gave it 3/5 stars, describing it as "pulpy entertainment where quibbling over plot points is ill-advised". Conran noted that the fast-paced storytelling and frequent shifts in genre forced "logic to take a back seat to visceral thrills and emotional swings". In a 3.5/5 star review for India Today, Bhavna Agarwal praised the balance between "emotional aspects and action sequences". However, she noted a significant omission in the show's messaging, stating that it "doesn't quite take into consideration the external factors or fails to stress the need for more mental health guidance to prevent suicides".

=== Viewership ===
A December 22, 2023 report claimed that, according to Amazon Prime Video statistics, the series was the most watched show in Indonesia and Thailand and in the top ten most watched shows in 43 countries around the world, including Australia, Brazil, Japan, Malaysia, Peru, the Philippines, Singapore, and Taiwan.

=== Accolades ===
==== Awards and nominations ====
Name of the award ceremony, year presented, category, nominee of the award, and the result of the nomination
Award ceremony	Year	Category	Nominee / Work	Result	Ref.
Asia Contents Awards & Global OTT Awards	2024	Best OTT Original	Death's Game	Nominated	
Asia Contents Awards & Global OTT Awards	2024	Best Visual Effects	Death's Game	Nominated	

==== Listicles ====
Name of publisher, year listed, name of listicle, and placement
Publisher	Year	Listicle	Placement	Ref.
Time Magazine	2024	The 10 Best K-Dramas of 2024	9th place	
