= Ahn Young-mi =

South Korean comedian (born 1983)

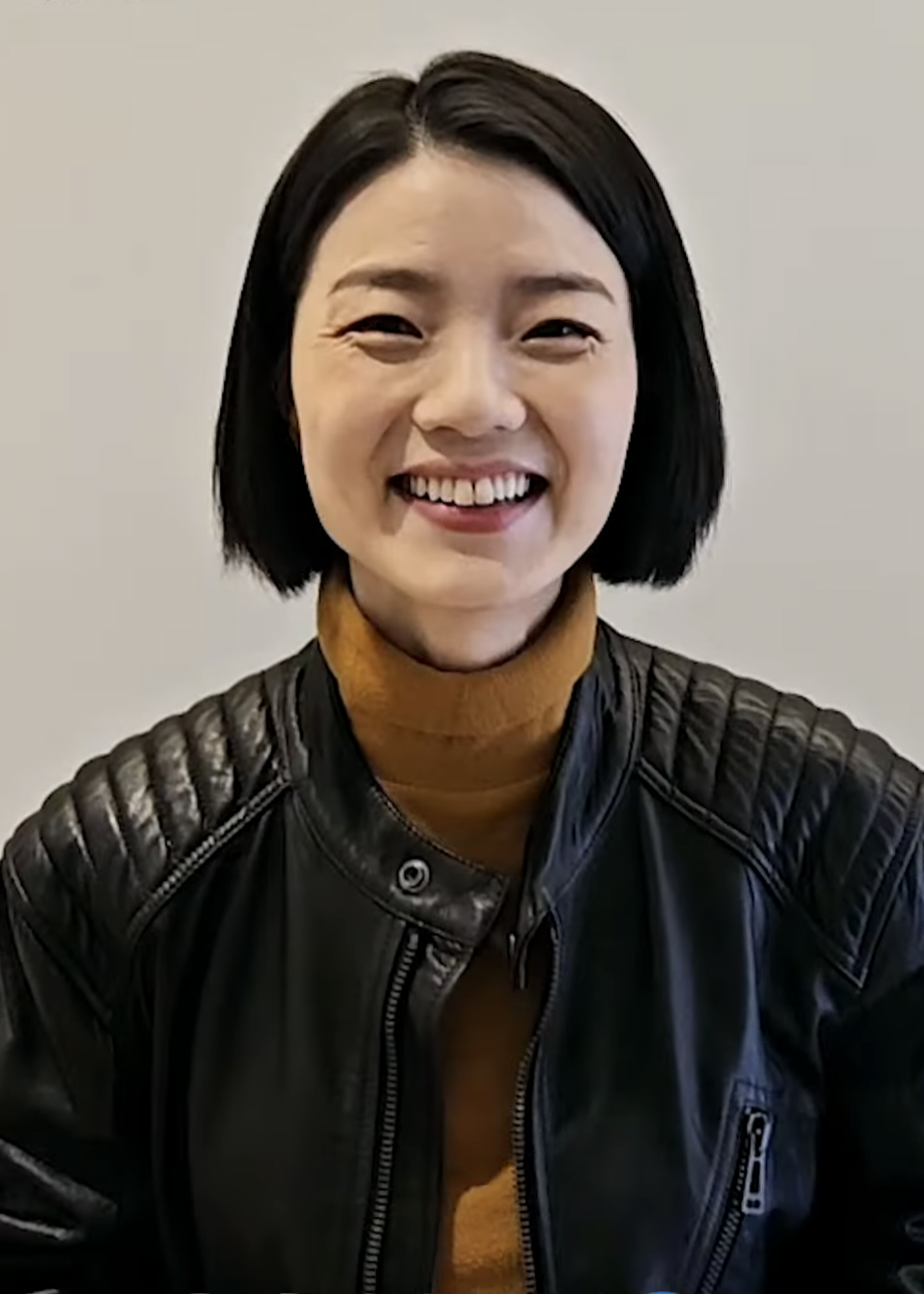
- Ahn in March 2024
- Born: November 5, 1983 (age 43); Wonju, Gangwon, South Korea
- Years active: 2004–present
- Agents: YG Entertainment (2015–2020); Medialab SiSo (2020-present)
- Spouse: Unknown (m. 2020) (Note: Young-mi and her non-showbiz husband (sometimes called 깍쟁이 왕자님 [kkakjaengi wangja-nim] or "miser prince" by Young-mi in referring to him in shows), registered their marriage on the 28th of February 2020 at Yongsan District. However, due to the circumstances brought by the pandemic, the two are yet to hold a wedding ceremony. Young-mi met her husband during Sunny's MBC FM4U radio show, Sunny's FM Date, back in 2015.)
- Children: 2

Comedy career
- Years active: 2004–present
- Medium: Stand-up, television
- Genres: Observational; sketch; wit; parody; slapstick; dramatic; sitcom
- Musical career
- Genres: K-pop; dance; entertainer
- Instrument: Vocals
- Years active: 2018–present
- Member of: Celeb Five

Korean name
- Hangul: 안영미
- Hanja: 安英美
- RR: An Yeongmi
- MR: An Yŏngmi

Ahn Young-mi (Korean: 안영미; Hanja: 安英美, born November 5, 1983) is a South Korean comedian. She made her debut in KBS' Gag Concert 19th class in 2004 and is best known for her provocative wit. In 2018, she joined the comedy-girl group Celeb Five. Young-mi is also known as the first female MC of the South Korean talk show, Radio Star since 2019.

== Personal life ==
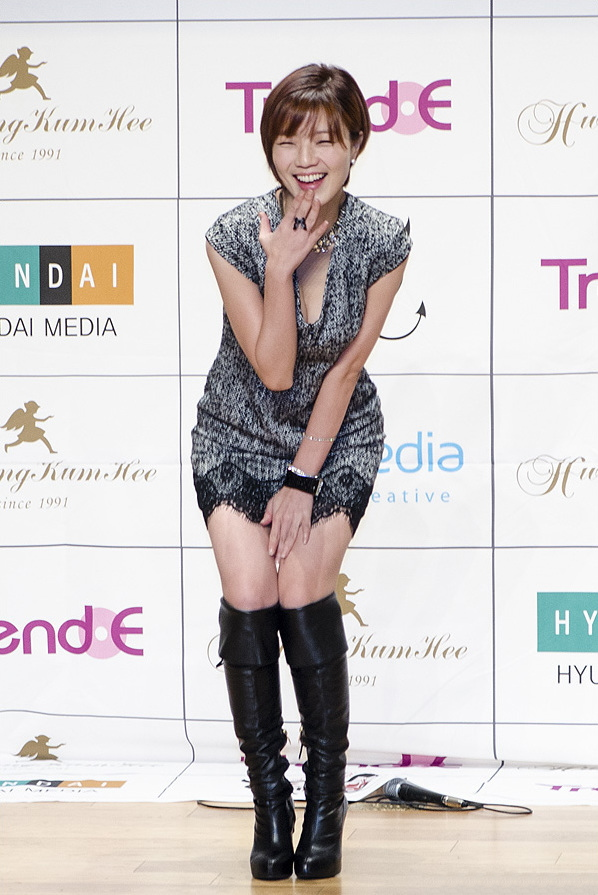
Ahn in 2014

In January 2023, Ahn's agency confirmed that she was pregnant with her first child and was due in July 2023. Ahn gave birth to a son on July 4, 2023. On June 25, 2026, Ahn gave birth to a second son.

== Philanthropy ==
On August 17, 2022, Ahn made an anonymous donation to help those affected by the 2022 South Korean floods through the Hope Bridge Korea Disaster Relief Association.

== Filmography ==
=== Television series ===
Year	Title	Role	Notes
2012	Reply 1997	Sechs Kies fanclub president	Ep. 10 guest role
2013	I Can Hear Your Voice	Shop customer	Ep. 16 guest role
2014	Be Arrogant	Dongdaemun merchant	guest role
2015	Kill Me, Heal Me	Fortunteller	Ep. 13 guest role
2015	Eating Existence	Yoo Yang	
2018	I Picked Up a Star on the Road	Joon Hyuk's Fan	Ep. 14 guest role
2018	Tale of Fairy	Jo Bong-dae	
2021	Yumi's Cells	Naughty cell	voice

=== Television show ===
- Radio Star (2019–2023)
- Gamsung Camping (2020)
- Sister Shoots (2021)
- Chart Sisters (2022; Host with Celeb Five Member)
- Filthy Village (2022) - Host
- The Return of Superman (2024–present) - Host (along with Actress Choi Ji-woo)

=== Web shows ===
Year	Title	Role	Notes	Ref.
2022	Celeb Five : Behind the Curtain	Cast Member	with Celeb Five Member	

== Awards and nominations ==
Year	Award	Category	Nominated work	Result	Ref.
2010	46th Baeksang Arts Awards	Best Female Variety Performer	Ahn Young-mi; Gag Concert	Won	
2016	tvN10 Awards	Best Comedienne	Comedy Big League	Won	
2018	18th MBC Entertainment Awards	Rookie of the Year – Radio (with Choi Wook)	Ahn Young-mi, Choi Wook's Eheradio	Won	
2019	19th MBC Entertainment Awards	Excellence Award in Music/Talk Category (Female)	Radio Star	Won	
2020	56th Baeksang Arts Awards	Best Female Variety Performer	Radio Star	Nominated	
2020	20th MBC Entertainment Awards	Popularity Award	Radio Star	Won	
2021	21st MBC Entertainment Awards	Excellence Award (Radio Category)	Muzie and Ahn Youngmi's Two O'Clock Date Radio	Won	
2022	2022 MBC Entertainment Awards	Top Excellence Award, Variety Category - Female	Radio Star	Won	

=== State honors ===
Name of country, year given, and name of honor
Country	Year	Honor	Ref.
South Korea (Note: Honors are given at the Korean Popular Culture and Arts Awards, arranged by the Korea Creative Content Agency and hosted by the Ministry of Culture, Sports and Tourism. They are awarded to those who have contributed to the arts and South Korea's pop culture.)	2021	Minister of Culture, Sports and Tourism Commendation	
