= Blue Dragon Film Award for Best Cinematography and Lighting =

- Awarded for: Best Cinematography and Lighting
- Country: South Korea
- Presented by: Blue Dragon Film Awards
- First award: 1963
- Winner: Lee Eui-tae
- Website: www.blueaward.co.kr

The Blue Dragon Film Award for Best Cinematography and Lighting is one of the awards that is presented annually at the Blue Dragon Film Awards by Sports Chosun, which is typically held at the end of the year.

== Winners ==
=== 1963–2013: Best Cinematography ===
#	Year	Cinematographer	Film
1	1963	Lee Yong-min	The Conqueror (정복자)
2	1964	Hong Dong-hyuk (black-and-white)	Extra Human Being
2	1964	Kim Jong-rae (color)	Red Scarf
3	1965	Seo Jeong-min	Heukmaek (흑맥)
4	1966	Ahn Yun-hyeok (black-and-white)	DMZ (비무장지대)
4	1966	Chun Jo-myung, Lee Byeong-woo (color)	Goodbye, Japan (잘 있거라 일본 땅)
5	1967	Seo Jeong-min (black-and-white)	Late Autumn
5	1967	Hong Dong-hyuk (color)	Children in the Firing Range
6	1969	Hong Dong-hyuk (color)	Starting Point (시발점), Women's Quarters (규방)
6	1969	Jeong Woon-gyo	You (당신) (black-and-white)
7	1970	Jang Seok-jun	Spring, Spring
8	1971	Hong Dong-hyuk	When a Woman Breaks Her Jewel Box
9	1972	Seo Jeong-min	A Hotel Room
10	1973	Yoo Jae-hyung	Long Live the Island Frogs
11	1990		
12	1991	Jung Il-sung	Fly High Run Far
13	1992	Yoo Young-gil	White Badge
14	1993	Jung Il-sung	Sopyonje
15	1994	Shin Ok-hyun	Life and Death of the Hollywood Kid
16	1995	Yoo Young-gil	A Single Spark
17	1996	Park Hee-ju	The Ginkgo Bed
18	1997	Chun Jo-myung	Downfall
19	1998	Yoo Young-gil	Christmas in August
20	1999	Jeong Kwang-seok	Nowhere to Hide
21	2000	Kim Seong-bok	Joint Security Area
22	2001	Kim Hyung-koo	Musa (film)
23	2002	Jung Il-sung	Chi-hwa-seon
24	2003	Kim Hyung-koo	Memories of Murder
25	2004	Hong Kyung-pyo	Taegukgi
26	2005	Kim Ji-yong	A Bittersweet Life
27	2006	Choi Young-hwan	Tazza: The High Rollers
28	2007	Yoon Nam-joo	Epitaph
29	2008	Lee Mo-gae	The Good, the Bad, the Weird
30	2009	Park Hyun-cheol	Take Off
31	2010	Lee Mo-gae	I Saw the Devil
32	2011	Kim Woo-hyung	The Front Line
33	2012	Kim Tae-gyeong	A Muse
34	2013	Choi Young-hwan	The Berlin File

=== 2005–2013: Best Lighting ===
#	Year	Lighting designer	Film
26	2005	Shin Kyung-man	Duelist
27	2006	Lee Kang-san	The Host
28	2007	Im Jae-young	Hwang Jin-yi
29	2008	Kang Dae-hee	Modern Boy
30	2009	Choi Cheol-su, Park Dong-sun	Mother
31	2010	Oh Seung-chul	I Saw the Devil
32	2011	Hwang Soon-wook	The Yellow Sea
33	2012	Hong Seung-cheol	A Muse
34	2013	Kim Sung-kwan	The Berlin File

=== 2014–present: Best Cinematography and Lighting ===
#	Year	Cinematographer and Lighting designer	Film
35	2014	Choi Chan-min, Yu Yeong-jong	Kundo: Age of the Rampant
36	2015	Kim Tae-gyeong, Hong Seung-cheol	The Throne
37	2016	Lee Mo-gae, Lee Sung-hwan	Asura: The City of Madness
38	2017	Jo Hyung-rae, Park Jung-woo	The Merciless
39	2018	Kim Woo-hyung, Kim Seung-kyu	1987: When the Day Comes
40	2019	Kim Ji-yong, Jo Gyu-yeong	Swing Kids
41	2020	Hong Kyung-pyo, Bae Il-hyeok	Deliver Us from Evil
42	2021	Lee Eui-tae, Yu Hyeok-jun	The Book of Fish
43	2022	Lee Mo-gae, Lee Sung-hwan	Hunt
44	2023	Kim Tae-kyeong, Hong Seung-chul	The Night Owl
45	2024	Lee Mo-gae, Lee Sung-hwan	Exhuma
46	2025	Hong Kyung-pyo, Park Jeong-woo	Harbin

== General references ==
- "Winners and nominees lists". Blue Dragon Film Awards (in Korean). Archived from the original on 27 January 2022.
- "Blue Dragon Film Awards". Naver (in Korean).
