= Remember You =

Remember You may refer to:

- Remember You (song), a 2012 single by Wiz Khalifa featuring The Weeknd
- Remember You (album), a 2023 album by Ayumi Hamasaki
- Remember You (film), a 2016 South Korean independent film
- Remember You, a song by Got7, from the album 7 for 7
- Remember You, a song by Hayden James, from the album Between Us
