= Artist Company =

South Korean actors agency

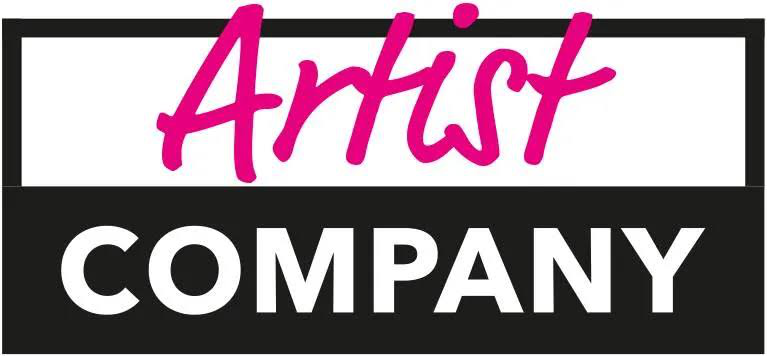
- Native name: 아티스트 컴퍼니
- Type: Private
- Industry: Entertainment
- Founded: May 9, 2016; 10 years ago
- Founder: Jung Woo-sung; Lee Jung-jae
- Headquarters: 430 Dosan-daero, Gangnam-gu, Seoul Special City (Cheongdam-dong), Seoul, South Korea
- Area served: Worldwide
- Key people: Kim Byung-sun (CEO, President); Lee Kyu-chang (Global Director)
- Services: Actors Management
- Revenue: ▲ ₩23.89 billion (US$17.82 million) (2022)
- Operating income: ▲ ₩273 million (US$203,689.39) (2022)
- Net income: ▲ ₩381 million (US$284,269.81) (2022)
- Website: artistcompany.co.kr

Artist Company (Korean: 아티스트컴퍼니) is a South Korean entertainment agency founded by actors Jung Woo-sung and Lee Jung-jae in 2016. The company is home of many major players in the Korean film industry including Jung Woo-sung, Lee Jung-jae, Ahn Sung-ki, Bae Seong-woo, Park So-dam, Cho Yi-hyun and Yeom Jeong-ah.

== History ==
=== 2016: Formation ===
On May 19, 2016, Lee Jung-jae and Jung Woo-sung, who have been close colleagues and friends for a long time, decided to establish Artist Company after much discussion and careful consideration with the aim of creating a rational and systematic company.

=== 2017–present: Leadership transition and expansion ===
On December 27, 2017, Jung Woo-sung has stepped down from his role as CEO of Artist Company to focus on his acting career. Kim Byung-sun, previously with Star K Entertainment, has been appointed as the new CEO of the agency.

On November 26, 2021, Artist Company founded by Lee Jung-jae and Jung Woo-sung, along with Artist Studio also represented by them, announced that they had entered detailed discussions for a merger and acquisition with Com2uS represented by Song Jae-joon and Lee Ju-hwan, and WYSIWYG Studios represented by Park Kwan-woo and Park In-gyu. On December 23, Com2uS and its subsidiary WYSIWYG Studios announced that they had signed an investment agreement to acquire the management rights of Artist Studio and Artist Company by investing 25 billion won and 80 billion won, respectively, for a total of 105 billion won. However, on May 30, 2022, Com2uS withdrew its decision to acquire Artist Company.

In December 2023, Lee Jung-jae and Jung Woo-sung acquired 45% and 9% of the shares, respectively, in the KOSDAQ-listed advertising company Wider Planet through a paid capital increase via a third party, with investments of approximately 10 billion KRW and 2 billion KRW each. This made Lee Jung-jae the largest shareholder of the company. In March 2024, Wider Planet announced a name change to "Artist United" and appointed Lee Jung-jae and Jung Woo-sung as inside director. The company's headquarters were relocated to the Artist Company premises, sparking speculation about a potential merger between the two companies.

== Artists ==
=== Actors ===
- Bae Seong-woo
- Cha Rae-hyoung
- Choi Kyung-hoon
- Jung Woo-sung
- Kim Jong-soo
- Kim Jun-han
- Kim Yoon-do
- Lee Jung-jae
- Park Hae-jin
- Park Hoon
- P.O
- Shin Jung-geun
- Yoo Jung-hoo

=== Actresses ===
- Cho Yi-hyun
- Kim Hye-yoon
- Lee Joo-young
- Lim Ji-yeon
- Won Jin-ah
- Yeom Jeong-ah

== Former artists ==
- Ahn Sung-ki
- Choi Ri
- Esom
- Go Ah-sung (2017-2026)
- Go Ara
- Ha Jung-woo
- Kim Eui-sung
- Kim Ye-won
- Jang Dong-joo
- Jang Woo-hyuk
- Jung Won-joong
- Lee El
- Lee Si-a
- Lee Soo-min
- Nam Ji-hyun
- Park So-dam
- Yun Jong-bin

== Subsidiaries and brands ==
- Artist Studio (Production studio) - formerly known as RaemongRaein
  - Trade Your Love (Co-production with B.A. Entertainment)
  - The Silent Sea
  - Hunt (Co-production with Sanai Pictures)
  - Tell Me That You Love Me (Co-production with Studio&NEW)
  - Following (Joint distribution with Content Zio Inc. and Moving Pictures Co.)
- MONSIEURJ (Men's cosmetic brand)
