= 12.12: The Day =

2023 South Korean film by Kim Sung-su

- Theatrical release poster
- Hangul: 서울의 봄
- Lit.: Spring in Seoul
- RR: Seourui bom
- MR: Sŏurŭi pom
- Directed by: Kim Sung-su
- Written by: Hong In-pyo; Hong Won-Chan; Lee Young-jong; Kim Sung-su
- Produced by: Kim Won-kuk
- Starring: Hwang Jung-min; Jung Woo-sung; Lee Sung-min; Park Hae-joon; Kim Sung-kyun
- Cinematography: Lee Mo-gae
- Edited by: Kim Sang-bum
- Music by: Lee Jae-jin
- Production company: Hive Media Corp.
- Distributed by: Megabox Plus M
- Release date: November 22, 2023
- Running time: 141 minutes
- Country: South Korea
- Language: Korean
- Budget: ₩23 billion
- Box office: $97.5 million

12.12: The Day (Korean: 서울의 봄; RR: Seourui bom; lit. Seoul's Spring) is a 2023 South Korean historical drama film directed by Kim Sung-su, starring Hwang Jung-min, Jung Woo-sung, Lee Sung-min, Park Hae-joon, and Kim Sung-kyun. The film is set against the backdrop of the December 12, 1979, military coup from the late 1970s to early 1980s. It was released theatrically on November 22, 2023.

The film grossed $97 million worldwide against a $17 million budget, becoming the highest-grossing South Korean film of 2023 and the fourth-highest-grossing South Korean film of all time. It was also selected as the South Korean entry for the Best International Feature Film category for the 97th Academy Awards.

== Plot ==
On the night of October 26, 1979, following the sudden assassination of Park Chung Hee, military leaders, high-ranking government officials, and unit commanders across South Korea are urgently summoned to Army Headquarters. Among them is Major General Lee Tae-shin, who arrives confused and unaware of the unfolding crisis. Soon after, Prime Minister Choi Han-kyu announces the president's death and, as acting president, declares martial law across the country (except Jeju Island). General Jung Sang-ho is appointed martial law commander and orders an investigation into the assassination, placing Major General Chun Doo-gwang, head of the Defense Security Command, in charge of the probe.

As the official government structure falters due to the power vacuum at the top, Chun begins to consolidate power. He manipulates the investigation, sidelines government officials, and misappropriates state funds. Tensions rise between Chun and Jung, who begins to suspect Chun's intentions. Jung warns against military interference in politics and attempts to counterbalance Chun's growing influence by appointing the principled and apolitical Lee Tae-shin as commander of the Capital Defense Command. Although reluctant, Lee accepts the post out of a sense of duty. Chun, seeing Jung as a threat, secretly plots to remove him by falsely accusing him of being complicit in the president's assassination.

Chun gathers loyal members of the secretive Hanahoe faction, including longtime ally Major General Roh Tae-gun. They conspire to arrest General Jung on fabricated charges, setting their coup in motion for December 12. On the day of the plot, Chun deceives government officials and mobilizes units under Hanahoe's influence to abduct Jung from his residence. Despite fierce resistance and a shootout that injures Jung's aides, Chun's forces succeed in capturing him. Meanwhile, Lee Tae-shin begins to uncover the scale of the coup and rushes to his command to respond.

Lee initiates a counteroffensive by ordering loyal units to block bridges and entry points into Seoul. Though Chun tries to legitimize the coup by obtaining presidential approval, acting president Choi refuses to authorize Jung's arrest without proper procedure. Tensions escalate further when Lee threatens to shell the rebel-held 30th Security Group unless they surrender. Chun's men panic, but at the last moment, Defense Minister Oh Guk-sang, who had been hiding, arrives and orders Lee's dismissal, effectively ending the standoff.

With Lee removed, the tide turns. His forces are disbanded, and Chun regains control. Lee, refusing to back down, approaches Chun alone but is arrested. The Hanahoe faction celebrates their success while the loyalist leaders are tortured or detained. Chun ultimately receives the president's retroactive approval for the coup, securing his path to power.

== Cast ==
- Hwang Jung-min as Major General Chun Doo-gwang, based on Chun Doo-hwan
- Jung Woo-sung as Major General Lee Tae-shin, based on Jang Tae-wan
- Lee Sung-min as General Jung Sang-ho, based on Jeong Seung-hwa
- Park Hae-joon as Major General Roh Tae-gun, based on Roh Tae-woo
- Kim Sung-kyun as Brigadier General Kim Jun-yeob
- Kim Eui-sung as Oh Guk-sang
- Jung Dong-hwan as President Choi Han-kyu, based on Choi Kyu-hah
- Jeon Jin-ki as Capital Corps Commander Hyun Chi-sung
- Ahn Nae-sang as Lieutenant General Han Young-gu
- Choi Byung-mo as Brigadier General Do Hee-cheol
- Park Hoon as Colonel Moon Il-pyeong
- Lee Jae-yoon as Lieutenant Colonel Lim Hak-ju
- Kim Sung-oh as Brigadier General Kim Chang-se
- Park Won-sang as Lieutenant General Go Jae-young
- Nam Yun-Ho as Colonel Kang Dong-Chan
- Yoo Seong-joo as Lieutenant General Min Seong-bae
- Hong Seo-jun as Ha Chang-soo
- Ahn Se-ho as Jang Min-ki
- Han Kyu-won as Son Kyu-won
- Jeon Su-ji as Lee Tae-shin's wife
- Paul Battle as U.S. ambassador to South Korea
- Brad Curtin as General Beckhum
- Jung Man-sik as Major General Gong Soo-hyuk
- Jung Hae-in as Major Oh Jin-ho
- Lee Joon-hyuk as Warrant Officer Kwon Hyung-jin

== Production ==
=== Background ===
Director Kim Sung-su revealed at a press conference that he was a senior in high school at the time of the Coup d'état of December Twelfth and was living in Hannam-dong, Seoul, where the incident occurred. He left his house and was walking around the neighborhood, and when he heard a gunshot from the Army Chief of Staff's official residence, he attempted to approach it but was unable to because soldiers almost fully prevented access to the residence. He was scared because he heard gunshots all night and he couldn't approach the official residence, but his curiosity was piqued because he couldn't get answers to what had happened, and that curiosity ultimately led him to make the film.

The scenes set at the headquarters of the Korean Army were shot at the headquarters of Kyungpook National University in Daegu, North Gyeongsang.

In the film, pseudonyms are used instead of the real persons' names and, although it is based on real events, the film fictionalizes some elements of the story.

=== Filming ===
Principal photography began in February 2022 and ended in July 2022.

== Reception ==
=== Box office ===
As of December 3, 2023, 12.12: The Day has grossed $34.2 million and sold 4.66 million tickets. It became the biggest film of 2023 in Korea, when it grossed $90.5 million by end of December 2023. By the end of February 2024, it has grossed over $97 million.

=== Public response ===
The film is set in the 1980s, but the Korean audience consisted mostly of younger people (20 and 30 somethings) rather than middle-aged people (people in their 40s and 50s). Younger viewers even took a heart rate challenge, where people would check their heart rate using their smartwatches while watching the movie, then screenshot it and upload it on social media to show their heightened stress or righteous anger while watching the film.

In Korea, a result of the popularity of the film was an increased interest in other films with a historical bent, such as 5th Republic, which focuses on the Korean Coup d'état of December Twelfth.

=== Critical response ===
A review for Screen Daily said that the film was "also entirely accessible to viewers with little knowledge of South Korean politics." "It's not often that a movie that's both so historically accurate and entertaining comes around, which makes 12.12 especially laudable," wrote The Escapist. Other reviews praised the production.

== Accolades ==
Name of the award ceremony, year presented, category, nominee of the award, and the result of the nomination
Award ceremony	Year	Category	Nominee / Work	Result	Ref.
Asian Film Awards	2024	Best Film	12.12: The Day	Nominated	
Asian Film Awards	2024	Best Director	Kim Sung-su	Nominated	
Asian Film Awards	2024	Best Actor	Hwang Jung-min	Nominated	
Asian Film Awards	2024	Best Supporting Actor	Park Hoon	Won	
Asian Film Awards	2024	Best Editing	Kim Sang-bum	Won	
Asian Film Awards	2024	Best Cinematography	Lee Mo-gae	Nominated	
Baeksang Arts Awards	2024	Grand Prize – Film	Kim Sung-su	Won	
Baeksang Arts Awards	2024	Best Film	12.12: The Day	Won	
Baeksang Arts Awards	2024	Best Director	Kim Sung-su	Nominated	
Baeksang Arts Awards	2024	Best Actor	Jung Woo-sung	Nominated	
Baeksang Arts Awards	2024	Best Actor	Hwang Jung-min	Won	
Baeksang Arts Awards	2024	Best Screenplay	Hong In-pyo, Hong Won-chan, Lee Young-jong, Kim Sung-su	Nominated	
Baeksang Arts Awards	2024	Technical Award	Hwang Hyo-gyun (SFX makeup)	Nominated	
Baeksang Arts Awards	2024	Technical Award	Lee Mo-gae (Cinematography)	Nominated	
Blue Dragon Film Awards	2024	Best Film	12.12: The Day	Won	
Blue Dragon Film Awards	2024	Best Director	Kim Sung-su	Nominated	
Blue Dragon Film Awards	2024	Best Actor	Jung Woo-sung	Nominated	
Blue Dragon Film Awards	2024	Best Actor	Hwang Jung-min	Won	
Blue Dragon Film Awards	2024	Best Supporting Actor	Park Hae-joon	Nominated	
Blue Dragon Film Awards	2024	Best Screenplay	Hong In-pyo, Hong Won-chan, Lee Young-jong, Kim Sung-su	Nominated	
Blue Dragon Film Awards	2024	Best Editing	Kim Sang-bum	Won	
Blue Dragon Film Awards	2024	Best Cinematography and Lighting	Lee Mo-gae, Lee Sung-hwan	Nominated	
Blue Dragon Film Awards	2024	Best Art Direction	Jang Geun-young, Eun Hee-sang	Nominated	
Blue Dragon Film Awards	2024	Technical Award	Jung Do-ahn (SFX)	Nominated	
Buil Film Awards	2024	Best Film	12.12: The Day	Nominated	
Buil Film Awards	2024	Best Director	Kim Sung-su	Won	
Buil Film Awards	2024	Best Actor	Hwang Jung-min	Nominated	
Buil Film Awards	2024	Best Actor	Jung Woo-sung	Won	
Buil Film Awards	2024	Best Screenplay	Hong In-pyo, Hong Won-chan, Lee Young-jong, Kim Sung-su	Nominated	
Buil Film Awards	2024	Best Cinematography	Lee Mo-gae	Nominated	
Buil Film Awards	2024	Best Art/Technical Award	Jang Geun-young	Nominated	
Buil Film Awards	2024	Best Music	Lee Jae-jin	Nominated	
Director's Cut Awards	2024	Best Director (Film)	Kim Sung-su	Won	
Director's Cut Awards	2024	Best Actor (Film)	Hwang Jung-min	Nominated	
Director's Cut Awards	2024	Best Actor (Film)	Jung Woo-sung	Nominated	
Director's Cut Awards	2024	Best Screenplay	Hong In-pyo, Hong Won-chan, Lee Young-jong, Kim Sung-su	Won	
Director's Cut Awards	2024	Best New Actor (Film)	Kim Eui-sung	Nominated	

== Related history ==
- Fifth Republic of Korea
- The Man Standing Next - film about the assassination of President Park Chung Hee.

== See also ==
- List of submissions to the 97th Academy Awards for Best International Feature Film
- List of South Korean submissions for the Academy Award for Best International Feature Film
