= 33rd Buil Film Awards =

2024 edition of award ceremony

- Official poster
- Awarded for: Excellence in cinematic achievements
- Awarded by: Busan Ilbo
- Presented by: Hwaseung Group
- Announced on: Nominations: August 24, 2024
- Presented on: October 3, 2024
- Site: Signiel Busan Grand Ballroom in Haeundae District, Busan
- Hosted by: Kim Dong-wook; Go Ah-sung
- Official website: builfilm.busan.com

Highlights
- Star of the Year Award: Male: Female:
- Most awards: —
- Most nominations: 9 — Cobweb

Television coverage
- Network: MBC; Naver TV

The 33rd Buil Film Awards (Korean: 제33회 부일영화상) ceremony is hosted by the Busan-based daily newspaper Busan Ilbo. It was held on October 3, 2024, at the Signiel Busan Grand Ballroom in Haeundae District, Busan. In the 33rd edition, awards were presented in 16 categories for 222 Korean films that were released from August 11, 2023, to August 10, 2024.

== Judging panel ==
The judging panel consisted of 9 members:

- Nam Yu-jeong: Busan Ilbo Culture Department reporter
- Kim Yun-mi: director of the Korean Film Producers Association, CEO of OAL Company
- Song Kyung-won: editor-in-chief of Cine21
- Yang Kyung-mi: film critic, firector of the Korea Film Content Industry Research Institute
- Yoo Ji-na: film critic, professor at the Department of Film and Video at Dongguk University
- Lee Kyu-man: film director (the films The Policeman's Lineage, Wide Awake and Children)
- Lee Dong-eun: film director (the films Mothers and In Between Seasons)
- Jeon Chan-il: film critic, chairman of the Korean Cultural Content Critics Association
- Jeong Han-seok: Busan International Film Festival programmer

== Awards and nominations ==
Nominees and winners (winners denoted in bold):

**Best Film**	**Best Director**
**Revolver**; Cobweb; 12.12: The Day; Sleep; Exhuma	**Kim Sung-su** – **12.12: The Day**; Kim Jee-woon – Cobweb; Kim Han-min – Noryang: Deadly Sea; Oh Seung-uk – Revolver; Jang Jae-hyun – Exhuma
**Best Actor**	**Best Actress**
**Jung Woo-sung** – **12.12: The Day**; Song Kang-ho – Cobweb; Hwang Jung-min – 12.12: The Day; Jo Jung-suk – Pilot; Lee Hee-joon – Handsome Guys	**Kim Geum-soon** — **Jeong-sun**; Jeon Do-yeon – Revolver; Ra Mi-ran – Citizen of a Kind; Jung Yu-mi – Sleep; Kim Go-eun – Exhuma
**Best Supporting Actor**	**Best Supporting Actress**
**Song Joong-ki** – **Hopeless**; Oh Jung-se – Cobweb; Koo Kyo-hwan – Escape; Yoo Hae-jin – Exhuma; Park Ji-hwan – Handsome Guys	**Lim Ji-yeon** – **Revolver**; Jeon Yeo-been – Cobweb; Lee El – Following; Lim Sun-woo — Ms. Apocalypse; Yeom Hye-ran – Citizen of a Kind
**Best New Director**	**Best Screenplay**
**Lee Jeong-hong** – **A Wild Roomer**; Cho Hyun-chul – The Dream Songs; Jason Yu – Sleep; Jeong Ji-hye – Jeong-sun; Nam Dong-hyub– Handsome Guys	**Kim Mi-young** – **A Lonely Island in the Distant Sea**; Cho Hyun-chul – The Dream Songs; Kim Sung-su, Hong In-pyo, Hong Won-chan, Lee Young-jong – 12.12: The Day; Jason Yu – Sleep; Jang Jae-hyun – Exhuma
**Best New Actor**	**Best New Actress**
**Kim Young-sung** – **Big Sleep**; Joo Jong-hyuk – Iron Mask; Roh Jae-won – Ms. Apocalypse; Lee Do-hyun – Exhuma; Hong Xa-bin – Hopeless	**Jung Soo-jung** – **Cobweb**; Jung Yi-seo – Her Hobby; Jung Hoe-rin – The Continuing Land; Oh Woo-ri – Hail to Hell; Kim Hyeong-seo – Hopeless
**Best Cinematography**	**Art/Technical Award**
**Kang Kuk-hyun** – **Revolver**; Kim Ji-yong – Cobweb; Kim Tae-seong – Noryang: Deadly Sea; Lee Mo-gae – 12.12: The Day; Park Rodrigo Seh – Ms. Apocalypse	**Jeong Seong-jin** – **Noryang: Deadly Sea** (VFX); Jeong Yi-jin – Cobweb (Art); Jang Geun-young – 12.12: The Day (Art); Je Gal-seung– Alienoid: Return to the Future (VFX); Seo Seong-gyeong– Exhuma (Art)
**Best Music**	**Yu Hyun-mok Film Arts Award**
**Mowg** – **Cobweb**; Oh Hyuk – The Dream Songs; Lee Jae-jin – 12.12: The Day; Bang Jun-seok, Dalpalan, Kim Sung-su – Wonderland; Kim Tae-seong – Exhuma	**Jang Jae-hyun – Exhuma**
**Star of the Year Award (Male)**	**Star of the Year Award (Female)**
**Lee Jun-hyuk – 12.12: The Day**	**Shin Hae-sun – Following**

== Films with multiple nominations ==
The following films received multiple nominations:

Nominations	Films
9	Cobweb
8	12.12: The Day
8	Exhuma
5	Revolver
4	Sleep
3	Noryang: Deadly Sea
3	Handsome Guys
3	Ms. Apocalypse
3	Hopeless
3	The Dream Songs
2	Citizen of a Kind

== See also ==
- 60th Baeksang Arts Awards
- 44th Blue Dragon Film Awards
