= The Fox with Nine Tails =

- Theatrical poster
- Hangul: 구미호
- Hanja: 九尾狐
- RR: Gumiho
- MR: Kumiho
- Directed by: Park Heon-su
- Written by: Park Heon-su
- Produced by: Shin Chul; Yu Hyeok-ju; Ha Gwang-hwi
- Starring: Ko So-young; Jung Woo-sung
- Cinematography: Ku Jung-mo
- Edited by: Park Soon-duk
- Music by: Lee Dong-jun
- Production company: ShinCine Communications
- Distributed by: ShinCine Communications
- Release date: 23 July 1994
- Running time: 107 minutes
- Country: South Korea
- Language: Korean

The Fox with Nine Tails (Korean: 구미호; RR: Gumiho) is a 1994 South Korean film. It was the first feature film by the director Park Heon-su. It was also the film debut of the leading actors Ko So-young and Jung Woo-sung, who later starred together in Beat (1997) and Love (1999).

== Plot ==
Harah is a kumiho in the guise of a beautiful young woman, who desperately desires to become human. She falls in love with a charming taxi driver, Hyuk, and tries to use him to achieve her goal. But an agent from hell has been sent to track down and destroy her.

== Cast ==
- Ko So-young as Harah
- Jung Woo-sung as Hyuk
- Dokgo Young-jae
- Bang Eun-hee
- Lee Ki-young
- Lee Gun-hee
- Seo Gi-woong
- Kwon Hae-hyo
- Ahn Suk-hwan
- So Il-seop

== Production ==
The Fox with Nine Tails was the first Korean film to use computer-generated imagery and it foreshadowed other changes in the Korean film industry by pioneering the fantasy genre and using chaebol funds from the Byuksan Group to cover the budget. The opening scenes of the film depicting hell used approximately 200 extras, with the set costing in the region ₩100,000,000 (US$125,000).

== Release ==
The Fox with Nine Tails was released on 24 July 1994.
