= Jung Woo-sung =

South Korean actor (born 1973)

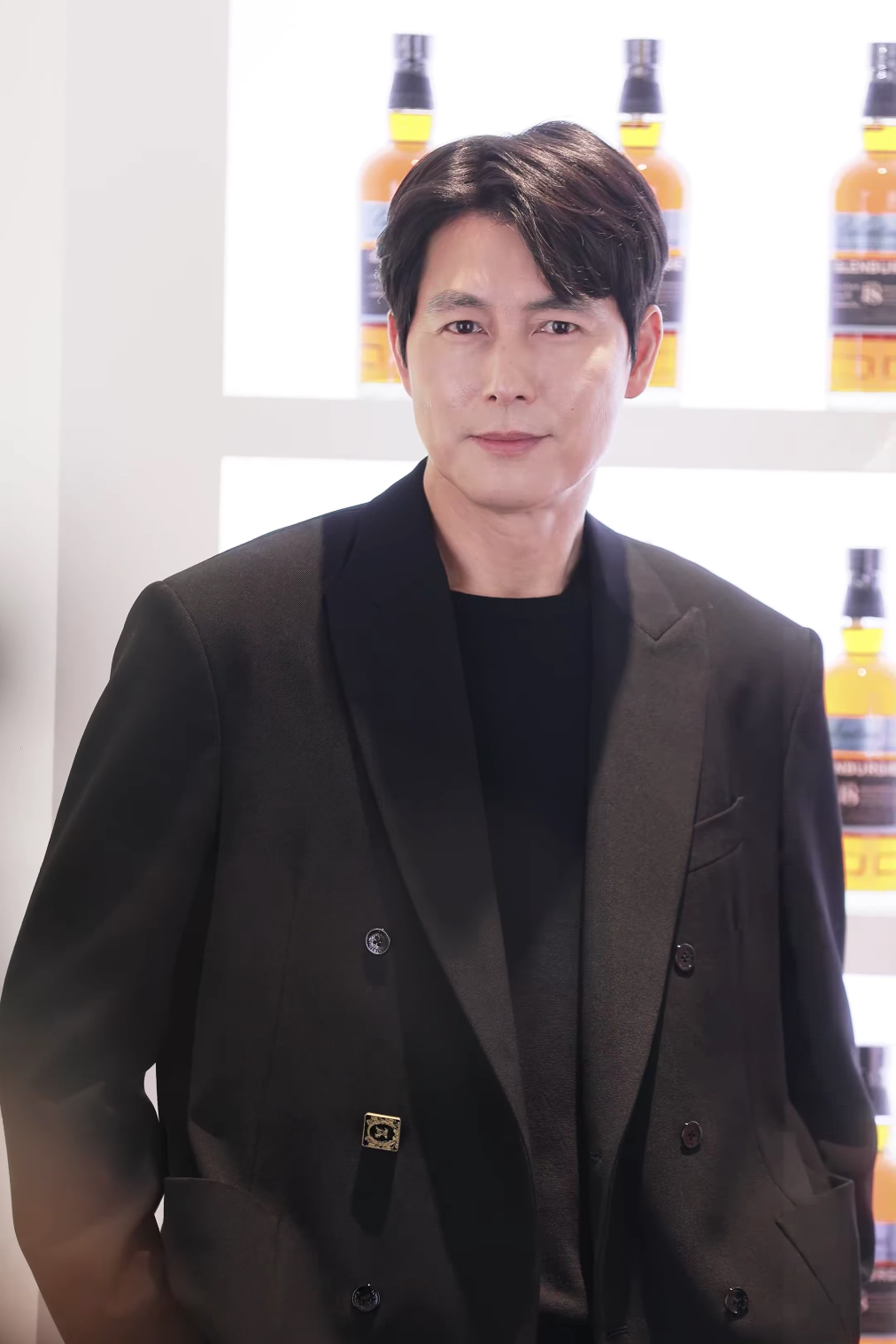
- Jung in March 2021
- Born: April 22, 1973 (age 53); Seoul, South Korea
- Occupations: Actor; director; producer; model
- Years active: 1994–present
- Agent: Artist Company (Note: Co-founder, with Lee Jung-jae)
- Spouse: Unknown (m. 2025)
- Children: 1

Korean name
- Hangul: 정우성
- Hanja: 鄭雨盛
- RR: Jeong Useong
- MR: Chŏng Usŏng

Jung Woo-sung (Korean: 정우성; born April 22, 1973) is a South Korean actor. He started his career as a fashion model, rising to stardom with the gangster film Beat (1997). He went on to establish himself as a versatile leading man, with films such as City of the Rising Sun (1999), Musa (2001), Mutt Boy (2003), A Moment to Remember (2004), The Good, the Bad, the Weird (2008), Cold Eyes (2013), The Divine Move (2014), Asura: The City of Madness (2016), The King (2017), Steel Rain (2017), Beasts Clawing at Straws (2020), Hunt (2022), and 12.12: The Day (2023). For his role in Innocent Witness (2019), he won the Best Actor at the 55th Baeksang Arts Awards and the 40th Blue Dragon Film Awards. Jung's notable TV credits include Asphalt Man (1995), Padam Padam (2011), and Tell Me That You Love Me (2023–24).

Jung served as the first South Korean UNHCR Goodwill Ambassador from 2014 until his resignation in 2024, citing backlash over his advocacy for refugees.

== Early life ==
Jung was raised in Sadang-dong, then one of the most economically disadvantaged neighborhoods in Seoul. Notably tall from a young age, he often hunched to mitigate his height, which drew attention during his elementary school years. He left high school after completing his first year to work and support his family. When trying to break into the film industry, he was told he was too tall to become an actor, leading him to begin his career as a model.

== Career ==
=== Acting ===
==== Film ====
Jung was selected as an actor through street casting by former Sidus CEO Cha Seung-jae, who was the head of the production department at the film company Shin Cine at the time. Jung made his film debut in a leading role in 1994's The Fox with Nine Tails, one of the first Korean fantasy movies and the first to use computer-generated imagery. He debuted with actress Ko So-young, who later co-starred with him twice including in his breakthrough 1997 film Beat. Directed by Kim Sung-su, Beat is about a high school student forced into gang life. The movie brought Jung widespread fame and started his rise to Korea's A-list and made him one of the most sought-after commercial models.

In 1999, he starred in City of the Rising Sun, playing an unsuccessful boxer who befriends an unlucky swindler. His co-lead in the movie, actor Lee Jung-jae, became his lifelong friend. Jung later played a naval lieutenant in Phantom: The Submarine and a marathoner in Love. 2001's Musa marked his third collaboration with director Kim Sung-su. In this epic blockbuster, Jung played opposite Chinese star Zhang Ziyi and received wide exposure in Korea and beyond.

After spending time in 2002 directing a series of music videos and appearing in a large number of commercials, Jung took on the eccentric lead role in Mutt Boy, the fifth film by director Kwak Kyung-taek. Jung's next roles were in highly romantic roles that used his established screen image. In the box office hit A Moment to Remember he played an architect whose wife (played by Son Ye-jin) is diagnosed with early onset Alzheimer's disease and in the Netherlands-set Daisy, he played a hired assassin who falls in love with a street artist played by Jun Ji-hyun. He portrayed a happily committed fireman in Sad Movie, and a demon hunter seeking his lost love (played by Kim Tae-hee) in The Restless.

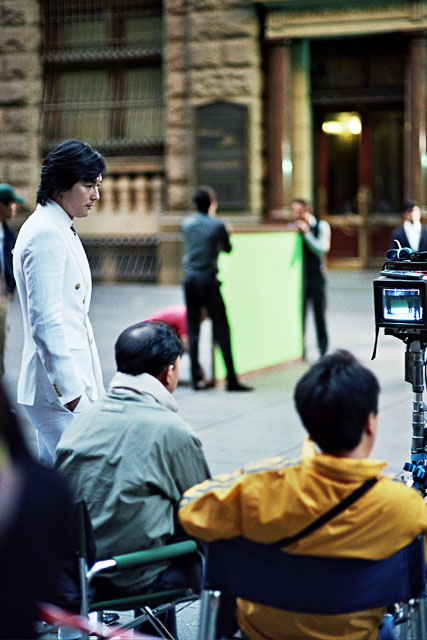
Jung Woo-sung on set in 2008

Kim Jee-woon's "kimchi western" The Good, the Bad, the Weird inspired by Sergio Leone's work, would become one of Jung's most iconic roles. He used his physicality to great effect as the Clint Eastwood counterpart in The Good, the Bad and the Ugly. The film was screened out of competition at the 2008 Cannes Film Festival, which also marked its world premiere. Jung attended the festival with his co-stars. He won Best Supporting Actor at the 3rd Asian Film Awards and Outstanding Achievement in Acting at the 2008 Hawaii International Film Festival for his performance. Shortly afterwards, Jung worked again with Kim Jee-woon on a short film for W Korea.

Jung then starred alongside Chinese actress Gao Yuanyuan in Hur Jin-ho's romance film A Season of Good Rain, and Su Chao-pin's martial arts film Reign of Assassins with Michelle Yeoh. In 2011, Jung was cast in the English-language 3D remake of John Woo's The Killer. The film was to be shot in Los Angeles and reunite him with A Moment to Remember director John H. Lee and Reign of Assassins director John Woo acting also as producer. The project was put on hold while John Woo worked on another film. But the project never progressed.

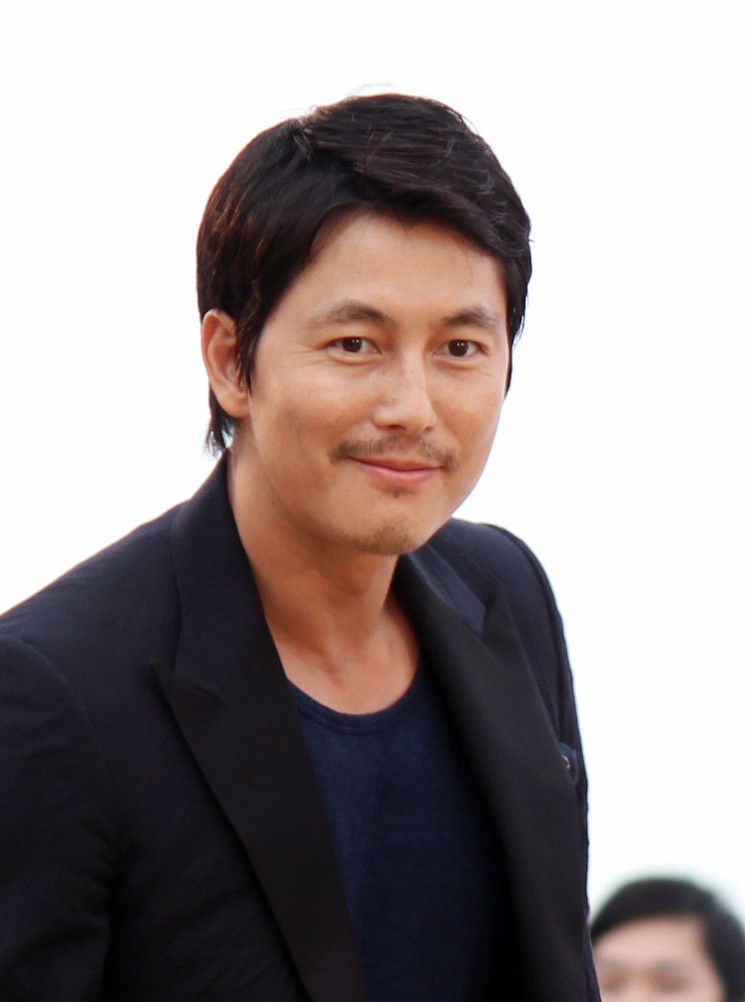
Jung at Busan International Film Festival 2013

Jung drew praise in his first villain role in Cold Eyes, an action thriller and box office hit in 2013. He portrayed the ruthless head of a criminal organization specializing in bank robbery, eluding detectives chasing him with uncanny dexterity.

Jung next played a baduk player seeking revenge in The Divine Move, followed by an adulterous university professor gradually losing his eyesight in Scarlet Innocence. Scarlet Innocence had its world premiere at the 2014 Toronto International Film Festival, attracting positive reviews from critics. He then took a leading role in the melodrama indie feature Don't Forget Me, also known as Remember You, a remake of the 2010 short film Remember O Goddess, both directed by Lee Yoon-jung. Jung also co-produced this movie, explaining that he wanted to protect the director's original ideas that other producers wanted to modify.

In 2016, he starred in the noir crime thriller Asura: The City of Madness, his fourth collaboration with director Kim Sung-su. Jung played a crooked detective who attempts to save his terminally ill wife while arresting a corrupt town mayor. Asura premiered globally at the 41st Toronto Film Festival in September 2016, where it was shown in the Special Presentations section. The actor's second movie shot in 2016 and released in 2017 was Han Jae-rim's political drama The King, whose plot revolves around a senior prosecutor being manipulated by an overambitious younger colleague connected to the mob.

In 2017, Jung starred in Steel Rain as a former agent from North Korea's intelligence bureau. In 2018, he played an officer of the elite police unit in the science fiction action thriller Illang: The Wolf Brigade. Based on the Japanese anime Jin-Roh: The Wolf Brigade, the work was his second collaboration with director Kim Jee-woon.

In 2019, he starred in the dramatic film Innocent Witness as a lawyer. His performance earned him the Grand Prize in film at the Baeksang Arts Awards. The same year, he starred in the thriller Beasts that Cling to the Straw.

In 2020, Jung starred in the sequel to Steel Rain, titled Steel Rain 2: Summit. Jung starred alongside Lee Jung-jae in the latter's directorial debut, the spy action film Hunt, which premiered at 2022 Cannes Film Festival.

==== Television ====
In 1995 Jung appeared in his first major television role in SBS drama series Asphalt Man, playing an aspiring race driver who leaves to United States to realize his dream. The part not only expanded his popularity but also brought him critical acclaim with Best New Actor award at 32nd Baeksang Arts Awards and SBS Drama Awards.

In 2010 Jung returned to the small screen after 15 years' absence in the big-budget spy series Athena: Goddess of War, playing an NTS (National Anti-Terror Service) agent. Athena was a spin-off to the 2009 highly successful KBS2 drama IRIS. With a budget of ₩20 billion (US$17 million), the series was shot on location in Italy, New Zealand, Japan and the United States. The aired in SBS channel, and its pilot episodes gathered 22.8% of the audience share. Jung and another actor were injured during filming in January 2011, causing a week's postponement of one of Athena's episodes. The series was also edited into a two-hour movie version, and released in 2011 as Athena: The Movie.

Jung made his Japanese drama debut with a guest appearance in episodes 6 and 7 of Good Life ~Arigatou, Papa. Sayonara~. He followed that with another TV series Padam Padam which marked the establishment of new cable broadcasting station JTBC. Jung said he "decided on this drama because (he) was drawn to the way Noh Hee-kyung writes 'family drama.' Whether mother-son or father-son, the love and pain experienced by families is something (he)'d like to try portraying in a realistic way." He played a man who has recently been released from jail after serving a 16-year sentence for a crime he didn't commit. The series premiered on December 5, 2011. In December 2020, he replaced Bae Seung-woo for SBS television series Delayed Justice as leading role. Jung served as an executive producer for Netflix series The Silent Sea in 2021. and in 2022 he will star remake of Japanese drama Say Me to Love Me

=== Directing ===
In 2000 Jung had started to try his hand at directing. His first works were music videos for one of the top South Korean pop music group G.o.d. In 2012, he directed and starred in the promotional commercial for cable channel XTM. And a year later, Jung was among four celebrities who directed a short film using smartphone Samsung Galaxy S4 with the theme "Meet a Life Companion." His short Love explored the feelings of first love, and recorded 1.8 million views on YouTube. He then directed another short film for Samsung Galaxy S4, this time for the project "Story of Me and S4." In Jung's short Beginning of a Dream, Choi Jin-hyuk starred as an ordinary office worker who dreams of leaving his mundane existence and entering a world of fantasy; he is approached by a blue fish, rides a sports car at supersonic speed, sees a boy floating past holding a balloon, hangs out with a hippie band in their van, and meets himself as a young boy at a bus stop.

In 2014, Jung along with actors Francis Ng and Chang Chen, directed three short films for Three Charmed Lives, an omnibus commissioned by the Hong Kong International Film Festival. Critics praised Jung's short The Killer Behind the Old Man as the strongest and most stylish entry. In it, a son hires an ultra-methodical hitman (played by Andy Choi) to assassinate his own father, but the killer however finds himself transfixed by the man's slow-moving and ordered life, and thus hesitates to carry through with his mission. Jung was invited to present The Killer Behind the Old Man at the 9th London Korean Film Festival in November 2014.

His feature directorial debut A Man of Reason, starring himself, Kim Nam-gil, Park Sung-woong, and Kim Jun-han was invited to the Special Presentations section at 2022 Toronto International Film Festival where it had its world premiere in September 2022.

=== Talent management ===
In October 2012 Jung left Taurus Films, his agent since 2009, and established new talent agency Red Brick House appointing his manager of 10 years as CEO. In May 2016, Jung and actor Lee Jung-jae co-founded and became CEOs of the talent management agency, Artist Company. Apart from the owners, the company represents other artists, viz. Lee Si-a, Go Ara, Ha Jung-woo, Esom, Nam Ji-hyun and Yum Jung-ah.

== Philanthropy ==
=== UNHCR ===
In May 2014, UNHCR Korea appointed Jung Woo-sung as its first celebrity supporter. He was officially nominated UNHCR National Goodwill Ambassador on June 17, 2015. He went on his first UNHCR mission to Nepal in 2014. He then donated ₩50 million (US$46,000) to help victims of the April 25 earthquake. In 2015 he visited South Sudan and in March 2016 he met with Syrian refugees in Lebanon. In June 2017 he went to Kurdistan Region of Iraq and visited Qushtapa camp for Syrian refugees and Hasansham U3 camp housing mainly Iraqis displaced from Mosul region. In June 2018, he faced political backlash when he shared a post online to encourage wider acceptance of refugees amid social division over Yemeni refugees arriving at the resort island of Jeju. In 2019, he published an essay collection about his UNHCR activities.

On July 15, 2024, Jung stated in an interview that he had concerns about being overly identified with the UNHCR Korea and the backlash against their humanitarian cause. He noted, "There have been accusations questioning whether my role as a goodwill ambassador was politically motivated, which have negatively impacted both me and the organization." On July 22, Jung's agency, Artist Company, announced that he had voluntarily resigned as a UNHCR goodwill ambassador on July 3 after nine years.

=== Hope Bridge Disaster Relief Association ===
On March 8, 2022, Jung donated ₩100 million won to the Hope Bridge Disaster Relief Association along with Lee Jung-jae to help the victims of the massive wildfire that started in Uljin, Gyeongbuk and has spread to Samcheok, Gangwon. On August 3, 2022, Hope Bridge Disaster Relief Association announced that Jung along with Lee Jung-jae had joined the Hope Bridge Honors Club, a group of major donors with more than ₩100 million donations.

== Film festival jury member ==
Jung has attended various international film festivals, not only as an actor or director, but has served on the following festivals' juries:

- 2012: 17th Busan International Film Festival, South Korea
- 2013: 14th Jeonju International Film Festival, South Korea
- 2014: 20th Gwangju Biennale, South Korea
- 2015: SSFF & Asia (Short Shorts Film Festival & Asia), Japan
- 2016: International Film Festival and Awards, Macao

== Personal life ==
Jung is best friends with fellow actor Lee Jung-jae, whom he met while filming City of the Rising Sun. They are co-owners and co-investors of several businesses, including management agency Artist Company.

Jung is outspoken about his political views, including his longtime advocacy for refugees, which has often drawn backlash in South Korea. He made headlines in November 2016 during a screening of his film Asura: The City of Madness (2016) when he declared, "Park Geun-hye, step down," amid protests calling for the then-president's impeachment. "All our citizens should be able to speak their minds politically without hesitation," said Jung in a 2017 interview. "Public engagement creates better nations and politicians."

Jung is notably private about his romantic involvements. He briefly dated his Athena co-star Lee Ji-ah. After they were photographed on a date in Paris, Jung confirmed their relationship in March 2011. However, following the revelation of Lee's past marriage to Korean singer-songwriter Seo Taiji in April, Jung and Lee broke up in May.

On November 24, 2024, Jung revealed that he has a son with model Moon Ga-bi. The couple first met in early 2022, and she gave birth to their son in March 2024. In August 2025, Jung's agency announced that he had registered his marriage to his longtime non-celebrity girlfriend.

== Filmography ==
=== Film ===
| Year | Title | Role | Notes | Ref. | | | |
|---|---|---|---|---|---|---|---|
| Year | Title | Role | Notes | Ref. | 1994 | The Fox with Nine Tails | Hyuk |
| 1996 | Born to Kill | Kil | | | | | |
| 1996 | Shanghai Grand | Ryu So-hwang | Cameo | | | | |
| 1997 | Beat | Lee Min | | | | | |
| 1997 | Motel Cactus | Lee Mi-ku | | | | | |
| 1999 | City of the Rising Sun | Do-chul | | | | | |
| 1999 | Phantom: The Submarine | Number 431 | | | | | |
| 1999 | Love | Myung-soo | | | | | |
| 2001 | Musa | Yeo-sol | | | | | |
| 2003 | Mutt Boy | Cha Cheol-min | | | | | |
| 2004 | A Moment to Remember | Cheol-su | | | | | |
| 2005 | Sad Movie | Jin-woo | | | | | |
| 2006 | Daisy | Park Yi | | | | | |
| 2006 | The Restless | Yi-gwak | | | | | |
| 2008 | The Good, the Bad, the Weird | Park Do-won, the Good | | | | | |
| 2009 | Present | Min-woo | Short film | | | | |
| 2009 | A Good Rain Knows | Park Dong-ha | Korean and Chinese co-production | | | | |
| 2010 | Reign of Assassins | Jiang Ah-sheng / Zhang Renfeng | Chinese production | | | | |
| 2013 | Cold Eyes | James | | | | | |
| 2014 | The Divine Move | Tae-seok | | | | | |
| 2014 | Scarlet Innocence | Shim Hak-kyu | | | | | |
| 2016 | Remember You | Seok-won | Also producer | | | | |
| 2016 | Asura: The City of Madness | Han Do-kyung | | | | | |
| 2017 | The King | Han Kang-sik | | | | | |
| 2017 | Steel Rain | Eom Chul-woo | | | | | |
| 2018 | Intention | Narrator | Documentary | | | | |
| 2018 | Illang: The Wolf Brigade | Jang Jin-tae | | | | | |
| 2019 | Innocent Witness | Soon-ho | | | | | |
| 2019 | Trade Your Love | Traffic cop | Cameo | | | | |
| 2020 | Beasts Clawing at Straws | Tae-young | | | | | |
| 2020 | Steel Rain 2: Summit | Han Kyeong-Jae | | | | | |
| 2022 | Hunt | Kim Jung-do | | | | | |
| 2022 | A Man of Reason | Soo-hyuk | Directional debut | | | | |
| 2023 | Woongnami | Wild Boar | Cameo | | | | |
| 2023 | Cobweb | Director Shin | Cameo | | | | |
| 2023 | Honey Sweet | Lee Yook-gu | Cameo | | | | |
| 2023 | 12.12: The Day | Lee Tae-shin | | | | | |
| 2024 | Harbin | Park Jeom-chul | Cameo | | | | |

=== Television series ===
| Year | Title | Role | Note | Ref. |
|---|---|---|---|---|
| 1995 | Asphalt Man | Kang Dong-suk | | |
| 1996 | Oxtail Soup | | Drama special | |
| 1996 | 1.5 | Lee Jang-wook | | |
| 2010 | Athena: Goddess of War | Lee Jung-woo | | |
| 2011 | Good Life ~Arigatou, Papa. Sayonara~ | Dr. Lee | Cameo; Episodes 6–7 | |
| 2011 | Padam Padam | Yang Kang-chil | | |
| 2021 | Delayed Justice | Park Sam-soo (Note: On December 12, 2020, the director announced that actor Bae Seong-woo, acting as the role of Park Sam Soon in the drama, is to be cast out of "Delayed Justice" due to a recent driving under the influence of alcohol. Jung Woo-sung replaced Bae Seong-woo.) | Episodes 17–20 | |
| 2023–2024 | Tell Me That You Love Me | Cha Jin-woo | | |
| 2025–2026 | Made in Korea | Jang Geon-young | | |

=== Television shows ===
| Year | Title | Role | Note | Ref. |
|---|---|---|---|---|
| 2021 | Stars of West Gando, 3500 | Narrator | (Note: A documentary produced to commemorate the 100th anniversary of the founding of the Shinheung Military Academy.) | |

=== Filmmaking credits ===
| Year | Title | Director | Writer | Producer | Notes | Ref. |
|---|---|---|---|---|---|---|
| 2000 | "After You Left Me" | Yes | No | No | Music video; g.o.d | |
| 2002 | "You Just Don't Know" | Yes | No | No | Music video; g.o.d | |
| 2002 | "Sad Love" | Yes | No | No | Music video; g.o.d | |
| 2002 | "A Fool" | Yes | No | No | Music video; g.o.d | |
| 2012 | Love and Ego | Yes | No | No | XTM commercial; also starring | |
| 2013 | Love | Yes | No | No | Short film | |
| 2013 | Beginning of a Dream | Yes | No | No | Short film | |
| 2014 | The Killer and the Old Man | Yes | Yes | No | Short film from Three Charmed Lives | |
| 2016 | Remember You | No | No | Yes | Also starring | |
| 2021 | The Silent Sea | No | No | Executive | Netflix television series | |
| 2023 | A Man of Reason | Yes | Yes | No | Also starring | |

== Accolades ==
Name of the award ceremony, year presented, category, nominee of the award, and the result of the nomination
| Award ceremony | Year | Category | Nominee / Work | Result | Ref. |
|---|---|---|---|---|---|
| Asian Film Awards | 2009 | Best Supporting Actor | The Good, the Bad, the Weird | Won | |
| Asian Film Awards | 2014 | Best Supporting Actor | Cold Eyes | Nominated | |
| Baeksang Arts Awards | 1996 | Best New Actor – Television | Asphalt Man | Won | |
| Baeksang Arts Awards | 2014 | Best Actor – Film | Cold Eyes | Nominated | |
| Baeksang Arts Awards | 2018 | Best Actor – Film | Steel Rain | Nominated | |
| Baeksang Arts Awards | 2019 | Grand Prize – Film | Innocent Witness | Won | |
| Baeksang Arts Awards | 2019 | Best Actor – Film | Innocent Witness | Nominated | |
| Baeksang Arts Awards | 2023 | Best Actor – Film | Hunt | Nominated | |
| Baeksang Arts Awards | 2024 | Best Actor – Film | 12.12: The Day | Nominated | |
| Beautiful Artist Awards | 2021 | Achievement Artist Award | Jung Woo-sung | Won | |
| Blue Dragon Film Awards | 1994 | Best New Actor | The Fox with Nine Tails | Nominated | |
| Blue Dragon Film Awards | 1997 | Best Actor | Beat | Nominated | |
| Blue Dragon Film Awards | 1999 | Popular Star Award | Phantom: The Submarine | Won | |
| Blue Dragon Film Awards | 2001 | Popular Star Award | Musa | Won | |
| Blue Dragon Film Awards | 2003 | Best Actor | Mutt Boy | Nominated | |
| Blue Dragon Film Awards | 2008 | Popular Star Award | The Good, the Bad, the Weird | Won | |
| Blue Dragon Film Awards | 2013 | Best Supporting Actor | Cold Eyes | Nominated | |
| Blue Dragon Film Awards | 2014 | Best Actor | The Divine Move | Nominated | |
| Blue Dragon Film Awards | 2016 | Best Actor | Asura: The City of Madness | Nominated | |
| Blue Dragon Film Awards | 2016 | Popular Star Award | Asura: The City of Madness | Won | |
| Blue Dragon Film Awards | 2019 | Best Actor | Innocent Witness | Won | |
| Blue Dragon Film Awards | 2021 | Best Actor | Steel Rain 2: Summit | Nominated | |
| Blue Dragon Film Awards | 2022 | Best Actor | Hunt | Nominated | |
| Blue Dragon Film Awards | 2024 | Best Actor | 12.12: The Day | Nominated | |
| Buil Film Awards | 2008 | Best Actor | The Good, the Bad, the Weird | Nominated | |
| Buil Film Awards | 2017 | Best Actor | Asura: The City of Madness | Nominated | |
| Buil Film Awards | 2020 | Best Actor | Beasts Clawing at Straws | Nominated | |
| Buil Film Awards | 2022 | Best Actor | Hunt | Nominated | |
| Buil Film Awards | 2024 | Best Actor | 12.12: The Day | Won | |
| Busan Film Critics Awards | 2016 | Best Actor | Asura: The City of Madness | Won | |
| Chunsa Film Art Awards | 2005 | Best Actor | A Moment to Remember | Nominated | |
| Chunsa Film Art Awards | 2018 | Best Actor | Steel Rain | Won | |
| Golden Cinema Film Festival | 2019 | Grand Prize (Daesang) | Innocent Witness | Won | |
| Grand Bell Awards | 1997 | Best Actor | Beat | Nominated | |
| Grand Bell Awards | 2002 | Best Actor | Musa | Nominated | |
| Grand Bell Awards | 2014 | Best Actor | The Divine Move | Nominated | |
| Grand Bell Awards | 2020 | Best Actor | Innocent Witness | Nominated | |
| Grand Bell Awards | 2022 | Best Actor | Hunt | Nominated | |
| Hawaii International Film Festival | 2008 | Outstanding Achievement in Acting | Jung Woo-sung | Won | |
| Hawaii International Film Festival | 2022 | Halekulani Career Achievement Award | A Man of Reason | Won | |
| Korea Fashion & Design Awards | 2008 | Best Dressed of the Year | Jung Woo-sung | Won | |
| Korea World Youth Film Festival | 2006 | Favourite Actor | Jung Woo-sung | Won | |
| Korea World Youth Film Festival | 2007 | Favourite Actor | Jung Woo-sung | Won | |
| Korean Association of Film Critics Awards | 1997 | Best New Actor | Beat | Won | |
| Korean Association of Film Critics Awards | 2021 | Rookie Critic Award | Jung Woo-sung | Won | |
| Korean Association of Film Critics Awards | 2022 | Best Actor | Hunt | Won | |
| Korean Film Producers Association Awards | 2019 | Best Actor | Innocent Witness | Won | |
| Korean Swan Best Dresser Awards | 2008 | Best Dresser Award (Actor) | Jung Woo-sung | Won | |
| Marie Claire Film Awards | 2017 | Pioneer Award | Asura: The City of Madness | Won | |
| Ministry of Culture, Sports and Tourism | 2011 | Distinguished Korean Wave Entertainer Award for Film | Jung Woo-sung | Won | |
| SBS Drama Awards | 1995 | Best New Actor | Asphalt Man | Won | |
| SBS Drama Awards | 2011 | Top Excellence Award, Actor in a Special Planning Drama | Athena: Goddess of War | Nominated | |
| Style Icon Asia | 2009 | Style Icon Actor | Jung Woo-sung | Won | |
| Style Icon Asia | 2013 | Top 10 Style Icon | Jung Woo-sung | Won | |
| The Seoul Awards | 2017 | Best Actor – Film | The King | Nominated | |

=== State honors ===
Name of country, year given, and name of honor
| Country | Year | Honor | Ref. |
|---|---|---|---|
| South Korea (Note: Honors are given at the Korean Popular Culture and Arts Awards, arranged by the Korea Creative Content Agency and hosted by the Ministry of Culture, Sports and Tourism. They are awarded to those who have contributed to the arts and South Korea's pop culture.) | 2021 | Presidential Commendation | |

=== Listicles ===
Name of publisher, year listed, name of listicle, and placement
| Publisher | Year | Listicle | Placement | Ref. |
|---|---|---|---|---|
| Forbes | 2015 | Korea Power Celebrity 40 | 16th | |
| Forbes | 2017 | Korea Power Celebrity 40 | 21st | |
| Forbes | 2018 | Korea Power Celebrity 40 | 17th | |
| Korean Film Council | 2021 | Korean Actors 200 (Note: Introduces 200 actors that best represent the present and future of Korean cinema to the people in the film industry all over the world.) | Included | |
| Movie Walker Press | 2024 | 10 Korean Actors that Movie Writers Recommended in 2024 | 10th | |
| Sisa Journal (Note: Sisa Journal Next Generation Leader-Society was founded by Sisa Journal in 2008.) | 2018 | Next Generation Leader in Society | 19th (Note: Tied with BTS, Yoo Jae-suk, Sean, etc.) | |
