= Ko So-young =

South Korean actress and model (born 1972)

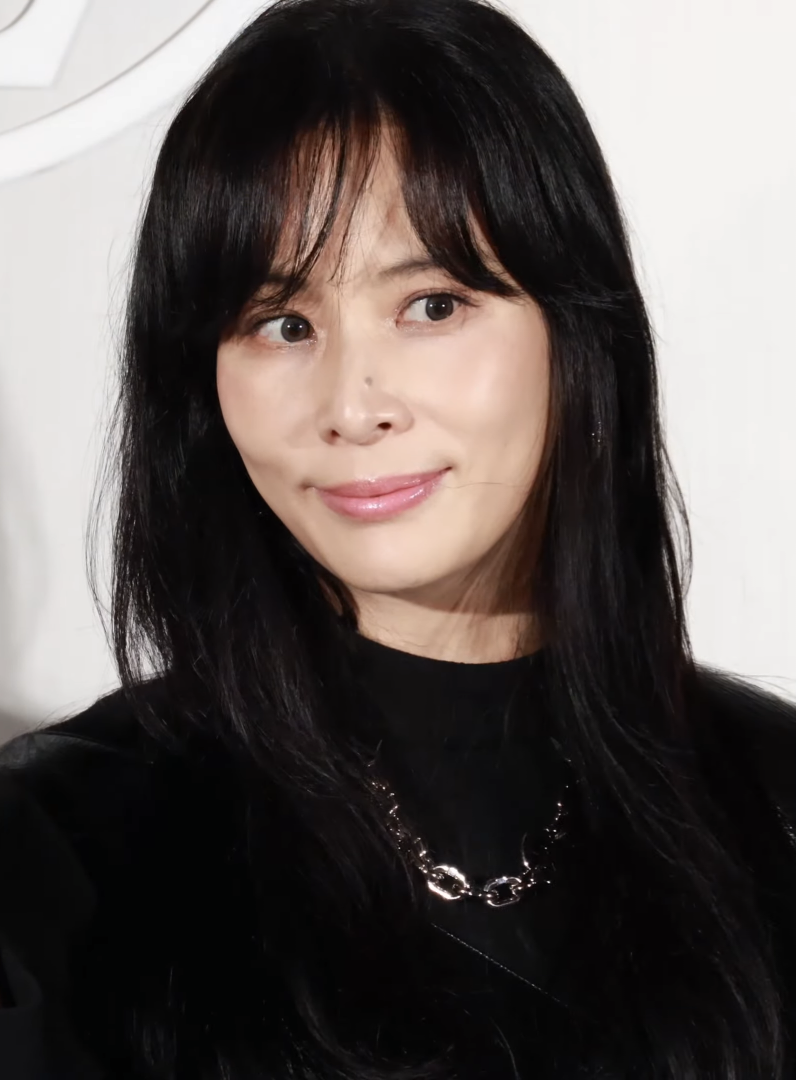
- Ko in October 2023
- Born: October 6, 1972 (age 54); Seoul, South Korea
- Other name: Go So-young
- Education: Chung-Ang University – Department Theater and Film; Korea University – Department of Computer Science
- Occupation: Actress
- Years active: 1990–2007; 2013–present
- Agent: Sublime
- Spouse: Jang Dong-gun (m. 2010)
- Children: 2

Korean name
- Hangul: 고소영
- Hanja: 高素榮
- RR: Go Soyeong
- MR: Ko Soyŏng

Ko So-young (Korean: 고소영; born October 6, 1972) is a South Korean actress and model.

== Early life ==
Ko was born in Seoul, South Korea. She attended an all-female high school before gaining early admission to Chung-Ang University, where she studied computer science.

== Career ==
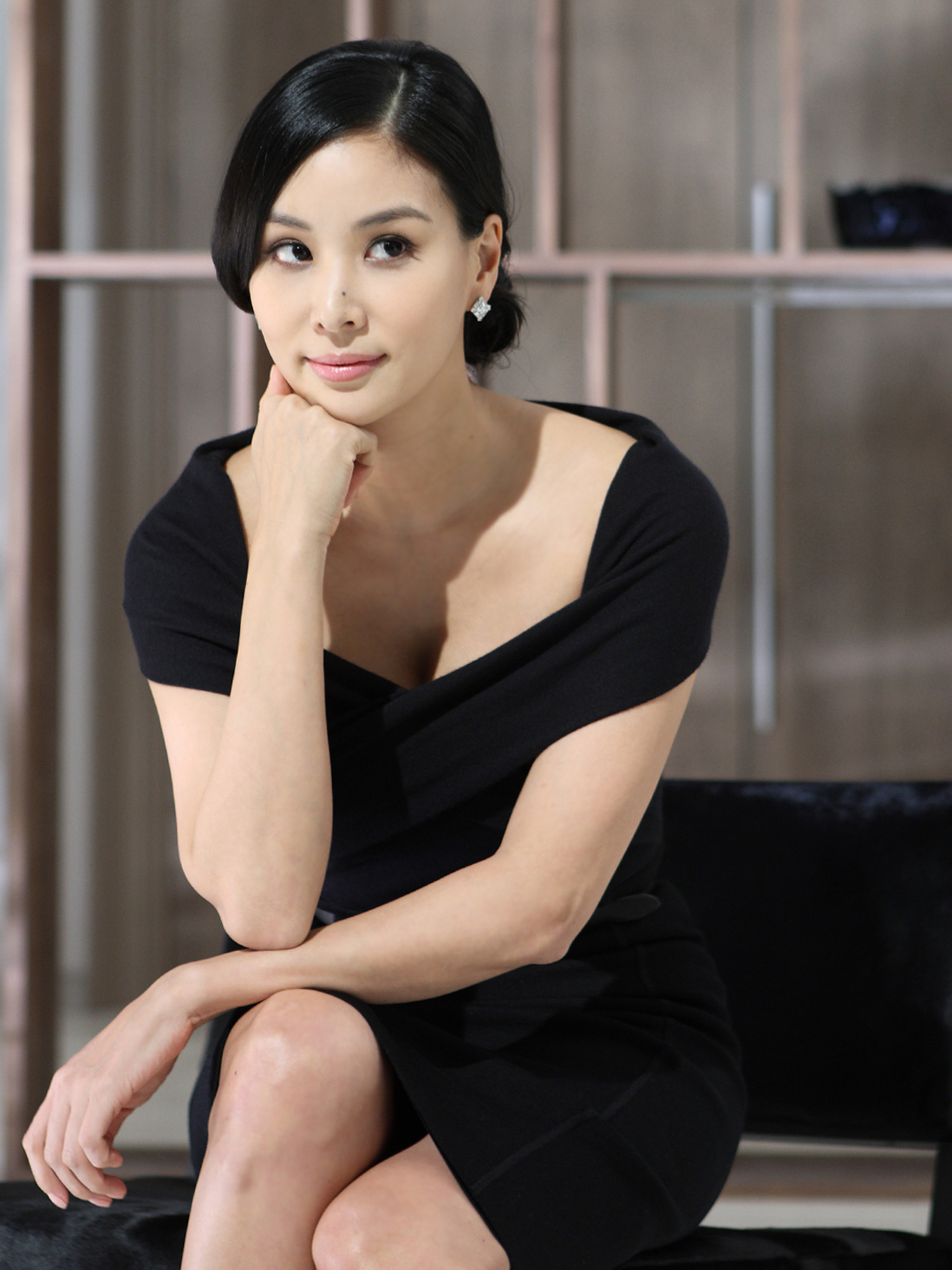
Ko in 2011

Ko debuted in the TV drama Love Tomorrow in 1993 and quickly established herself as a representative star of her generation. She made her film debut opposite Jung Woo-sung in The Fox with Nine Tails in 1994, which was the first Korean film to use computer-generated imagery. However, it failed to make an impression on audiences or critics. Ko first achieved wide recognition through her role in Beat (again with Jung Woo-sung), a film that caught the imagination of many South Korean high school students. Since then she has acted in a series of successful melodramas, portraying a young model in If the Sun Rises in the West, a Jeju Island tour guide in Love Wind Love Song, and a Korean American adoptee in Love.

In 2001, Ko teamed up with actor Lee Sung-jae in A Day, about a married couple who have trouble conceiving a child. Her acting in the film was much praised and garnered the Best Actress prize from the local Grand Bell Awards ceremony. Then, after two years off, Ko returned in 2003 opposite Han Suk-kyu in the spy thriller Double Agent; however, the film failed to live up to the expectations of most viewers and critics. She then shot two films in 2006: the horror film APT by director Ahn Byeong-ki, and the romantic comedy Project Makeover by debut director Jeon Young-gap. After two commercial flops in 2007 with Project Makeover and the SBS drama Blue Fish, Ko went into a hiatus.

A decade after her last appearance, Ko made a comeback with the KBS drama Ms. Perfect.

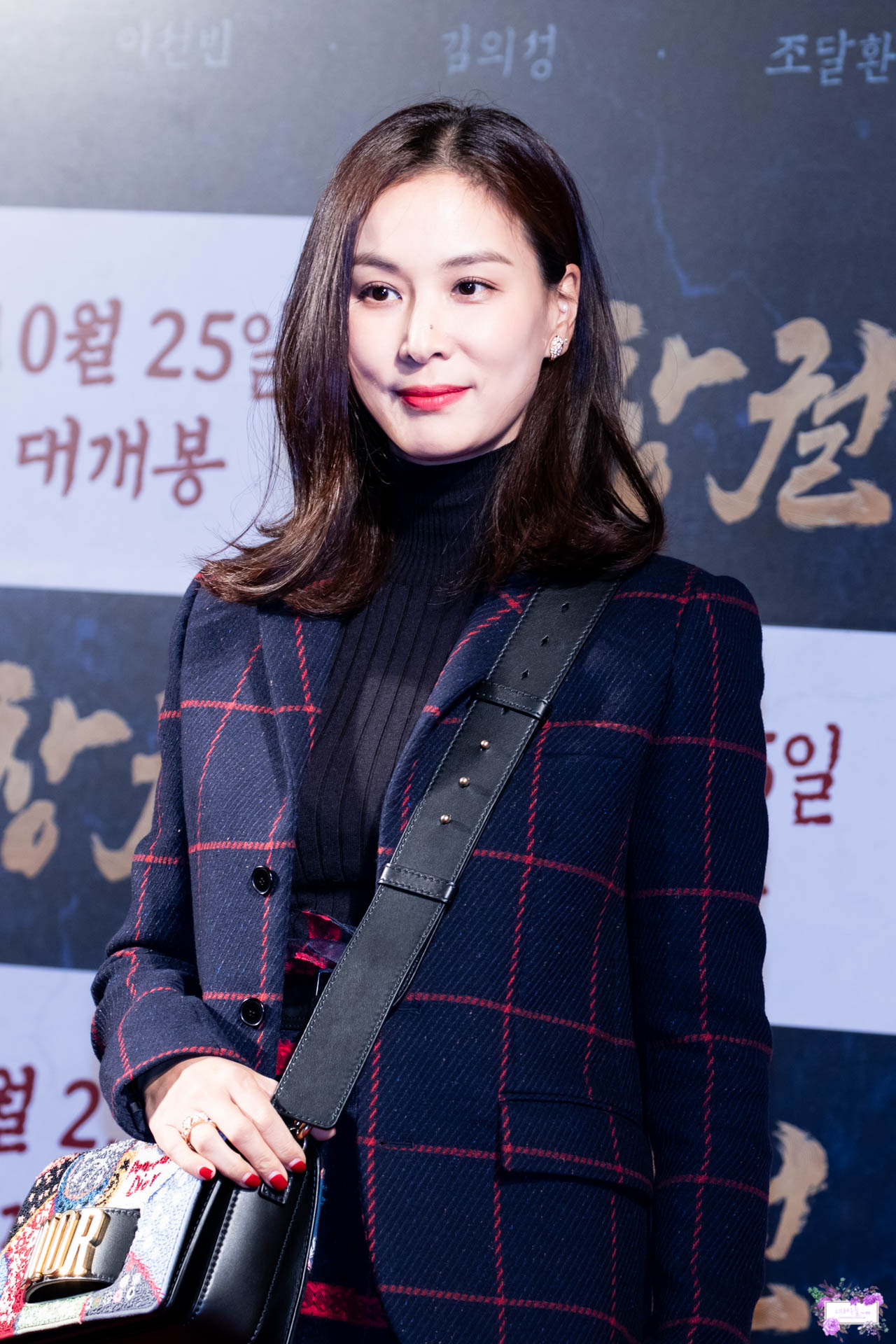
Ko in 2018

== Personal life ==
Ko married actor Jang Dong-gun in a star-studded wedding ceremony held at Seoul's Shilla Hotel on May 2, 2010, while five months pregnant. The couple's first child, a son Jang Min-joon, was born on October 4, 2010. Their second child, a daughter, was born on February 25, 2014.

== Filmography ==
=== Films ===
Year	Title	Role
1990	Friend, My Friend	Seol In-hwa
1994	The Fox with Nine Tails	Harah
1997	Beat	Ro-mi
1998	First Kiss	Joo-hee (cameo)
1998	If the Sun Rises in the West	Nam Hyun-joo / Yoo Ha-rin
1999	Love Wind Love Song	Young-seo
1999	Love	Jenny
2000	Joint Security Area	Woman in Nam Sung-sik's wallet photo (cameo)
2001	A Day	Jin-won
2003	Double Agent	Yoon Soo-mi
2006	APT	Oh Se-jin
2007	Project Makeover	Na Jung-joo

=== Television series ===
Year	Title	Role
1992–1994	Tomorrow Love	Yoo Hyun-kyung
1993	Mother's Sea	Kim Kyung-seo
1994–1995	My Son's Woman	Choi Soo-jung
1995	Sook-hee	Kim Sook-hee
1996	Star	Jang Hye-mi
1996	Beginning of Happiness	Shin Na-ra
1997	Women	Min Ji-soo
1998	The Barefoot Youth	Ki Hye-joon
1998	Memories	Kim Joo-hee
2007	Blue Fish	Jung Eun-soo
2017	Ms. Perfect	Shim Jae-bok
