= The Good, the Bad, the Weird =

- Theatrical release poster
- Hangul: 좋은 놈, 나쁜 놈, 이상한 놈
- RR: Joeun nom, nappeun nom, isanghan nom
- MR: Choŭn nom, nappŭn nom, isanghan nom
- Directed by: Kim Jee-woon
- Written by: Kim Jee-woon; Kim Min-suk
- Produced by: Kim Jee-woon; Choi Jae-won
- Starring: Song Kang-ho; Lee Byung-hun; Jung Woo-sung
- Cinematography: Lee Mo-gae
- Edited by: Nam Na-yeong
- Music by: Dalpalan; Jang Young-gyu
- Production companies: Barunson Co. Ltd. Grimm Pictures
- Distributed by: CJ Entertainment
- Release dates: 24 May 2008 (Cannes); 17 July 2008 (South Korea)
- Running time: 139 minutes
- Country: South Korea
- Languages: Korean; Mandarin; Japanese
- Budget: US$10 million
- Box office: US$44.3 million

The Good, the Bad, the Weird (Korean: 좋은 놈, 나쁜 놈, 이상한 놈) is a 2008 South Korean Western action film directed, co-written, and co-produced by Kim Jee-woon, and starring Song Kang-ho, Lee Byung-hun, and Jung Woo-sung. The film is an homage to the 1966 Spaghetti Western The Good, the Bad and the Ugly, and is set in Japanese-occupied Manchuria during the late 1930s.

The film marks the second collaboration between actor Lee and director Kim, who had previously collaborated on the action drama A Bittersweet Life (2005) and would later do so again in Kim's I Saw the Devil (2010).

The Good, the Bad, the Weird premiered at the 2008 Cannes Film Festival and had a limited release in the U.S. on 23 April 2010. It received positive reviews with critics praising the action, the cinematography and the direction.

== Plot ==
In the desert wilderness of Manchuria in 1939, months before the beginning of the Second World War. Park Chang-yi, "The Bad"—a bandit and hitman—is hired to acquire a treasure map from a Japanese official traveling by train. Before he can get it however, Yoon Tae-goo, "The Weird"—a thief—steals the map and is caught up in the Bad's hijacking of the train. This involves the slaughter of the Japanese and Manchurian guards and various civilians. Park Do-won, "The Good"—an eagle-eyed bounty hunter—appears on the scene to claim the bounty on Chang-yi. Meanwhile, Tae-goo escapes, eluding his Good and Bad pursuers. A fourth force—a group of Manchurian bandits—also wants the map to be sold at the Ghost Market. Tae-goo hopes to uncover the map's secrets and recover what he believes is gold and riches buried by the Qing dynasty just before the collapse of their government. As the story continues, an escalating battle for the map occurs, with bounties placed on heads and the Imperial Japanese Army racing to reclaim its map as it can apparently "save the Japanese Empire".

After a series of graphic shootouts and chases, a final battle erupts in which the Japanese army, Manchurian bandits, Do-won, Chang-yi and his gang are chasing Tae-goo all at once. The Japanese army kills most of the bandits. Do-won kills many Japanese soldiers and sets off an explosion that drives them away. Chang-yi's gang is slowly killed off, and he kills those who attempt to leave the chase. Only Chang-yi, Tae-goo and Do-won make it to the "treasure". However, they find that it is nothing more than a boarded-over hole in the desert. Chang-yi recognizes Tae-goo as the "Finger Chopper", a criminal who cut off his finger in a knife fight five years ago, and the man that Do-won had thought Chang-yi to be. Turning on each other in a final act of vengeance for the slights they suffered, they finally gun each other down after a prolonged Mexican standoff. The three lie in the sand, dying and alone, as the "useless hole" that they fought and died for suddenly and belatedly erupts with a geyser of crude oil. Do-won survives along with Tae-goo. With a newly raised bounty on Tae-goo, a new chase begins as he flees across the Manchurian desert.

=== Alternate ending ===
The version of the film released in South Korea features a longer ending.

In the alternative ending, Tae-goo, gets up. He reveals the thick metal sheet he hid under his quilted jacket and limps over to demolish the corpse of Chang-yi. While doing so, he discovers diamonds in Chang-yi's pocket and giggles with delight before realising he is surrounded by the Japanese army. Inadvertently lighting a stick of dynamite, Tae-goo scares off the Japanese and dives for cover after realising it was lit. Over the credits, Tae-goo sets off to continue hunting for the treasure with his bounty multiplied sevenfold, while Do-won vindictively pursues him.

== Cast ==
- Song Kang-ho as Yoon Tae-goo, "the Weird"
- Lee Byung-hun as Park Chang-yi, "the Bad"
- Jung Woo-sung as Park Do-won, "the Good"
- Yoon Je-moon as Byeong-choon
- Ryu Seung-soo as Man-gil
- Song Young-chang as Kim Pan-joo
- Ma Dong-seok as "Gom" (lit. "Bear")
- Son Byong-ho as Seo Jae-sik
- Oh Dal-su as Park Seo-bang
- Uhm Ji-won as Na-yeon
- Hakuryu as Ishihara
- Shôken Kunimoto as Abe
- Lee Hang-soo as Kanemaru
- Sang-woo Shin as Kuroda
- Jo Kyeong-hun as Doo-chao
- Kim Kwang-il as "Two Blades"
- Lee ChungaAh as Song-yi
- Alexander Pavlov as Russian engineer
- Lee Sung-min as a Cook
- Kim Hong-soo as Chinese captain
- Jeong Se-hyeong as Chinese sergeant
- Oh Yeon-ah as a Japanese female train passenger

== Production ==
Much of the exterior location shooting took place in the Gansu province of Northwestern China, as Manchuria lacked the type of open, dry desert landscape the production wanted. The rest of the film was shot in South Korea.

Fight choreographer Ji Joong-hyun died during production in a car accident.

== Release ==
The film was screened out of competition at the Cannes Film Festival on May 24, 2008. It also received screenings at the Toronto International Film Festival, Hawaii International Film Festival, Sitges Film Festival, Chicago International Film Festival, and the London Film Festival.

American distribution rights were acquired by IFC Films, which released it in theaters on a limited basis on April 23, 2010.

=== Home media ===
The film was released on DVD on March 11, 2009. The Korean release contains a longer version of the film and the international release has a slightly shorter cut with English subtitles.

== Alternative versions ==
Two versions of the film were released in cinemas: one for the native Korean market and the other for international sales. The Korean theatrical cut is 136 minutes long and the international cut is 129 minutes long. The ending of the international version reflects the end that director Kim Jee-woon originally wanted.

In the United Kingdom, the British Board of Film Classification ordered five seconds of cuts to the cinema release due to scenes of horse falls judged to be animal cruelty that violated the Cinematograph Films (Animals) Act 1937.

== Reception ==
=== Box office ===
The Good, the Bad, the Weird earned US$128,486 in North America and US$44,132,723 in other territories, bringing the worldwide gross to US$44,261,209. It was the second highest grossing Korean film in 2008 after Scandal Makers, beating The Chaser and it is one of the highest grossing films of all time in South Korea.

=== Critical response ===
The Good, the Bad, the Weird received generally positive reviews. Review aggregating website Rotten Tomatoes reported that 84% of 60 sampled critics gave the film positive reviews and that it got an average rating of 7.2 out of 10, stating that "Whilst never taking itself too seriously, this riotous and rollicking Sergio Leone-inspired Korean Western is serious fun." On Metacritic, it received generally favorable reviews with a total score of 69. Variety said that "East meets West meets East again, with palate-tingling results, in 'The Good the Bad the Weird', a kimchi Western that draws shamelessly on its spaghetti forebears but remains utterly, bracingly Korean" awarding the film 3.5 out of 5 stars. The A.V. Club gave it a B+ saying that "The story's many advances and reversals can be hard to follow at times, but this isn't a movie where plot is paramount. Everything boils down to the action, and what that action means". The New York Post gave it a four star rating out of five stating that "The Good, the Bad, the Weird may owe a lot to other films but it is always fresh and never boring". Empire magazine gave it a three star rating out of five commenting that "A tangled narrative and damp-squib ending detract from an otherwise joyous Spaghetti Eastern Western." Time Out critic Tom Huddlestone stated that "This is filmmaking as rodeo ride: bruising and ultimately pointless, but thrilling as hell while it lasts" and awarded the film four out of five stars. The Hollywood Reporter gave it a positive review declaring the film "a jaunty, happy-go-lucky adventure that packs a fistful of dynamite in the spectacular showdown."

On the other hand, there was criticism directed towards the excessive violence and the simplicity of the script. In particular, the Village Voice's Nicolas Rapold mentioned that "Kim's filmmaking is generally cartoonish in a bad sense, as he squanders his set pieces, flashbacks, and other attention-getting with sometimes downright wretched staging" while The Boston Globe wrote that the film "goes for shallow pop instead of narrative depth. It's a lot of fun before it wears you out, and it wears you out sooner than it should." Additionally, Robert Abele from the Los Angeles Times mentioned that "Knives, explosions and knockabout humor have been added to taste. As vigorously staged as it all is -- sometimes confusingly, occasionally with camera-torquing flair and impressive stuntwork -- the urge to thrill grows wearisome. Were audience members to be included as a collective character as well, they'd be 'The Tired'."

=== Awards and nominations ===
Award	Year	Category	Recipient(s)	Result
Asian Film Awards	2009	Best Film	The Good, the Bad, the Weird	Nominated
Asian Film Awards	2009	Best Director	Kim Jee-woon	Nominated
Asian Film Awards	2009	Best Actor	Song Kang-ho	Nominated
Asian Film Awards	2009	Best Supporting Actor	Jung Woo-sung	Won
Asian Film Awards	2009	Best Supporting Actor	Lee Byung-hun	Nominated
Asian Film Awards	2009	Best Cinematography	Lee Mo-gae	Nominated
Asian Film Awards	2009	Best Visual Effects	Dalpalan, Jang Young-gyu	Nominated
Asian Film Awards	2009	Best Composer	Kim Wook	Nominated
Asia Pacific Screen Awards	2008	Best Director	Kim Jee-woon	Nominated
Asia Pacific Screen Awards	2008	Best Cinematographer	Lee Mo-gae	Won
Baeksang Arts Awards	2009	Best Film	The Good, the Bad, the Weird	Nominated
Baeksang Arts Awards	2009	Best Director	Kim Jee-woon	Nominated
Baeksang Arts Awards	2009	Best Actor	Song Kang-ho	Nominated
Blue Dragon Film Awards	2008	Best Film	The Good, the Bad, the Weird	Nominated
Blue Dragon Film Awards	2008	Best Director	Kim Jee-woon	Won
Blue Dragon Film Awards	2008	Best Actor	Song Kang-ho	Nominated
Blue Dragon Film Awards	2008	Best Actor	Lee Byung-hun	Nominated
Blue Dragon Film Awards	2008	Best Cinematography	Lee Mo-gae	Won
Blue Dragon Film Awards	2008	Best Lighting	Oh Seung-chul	Nominated
Blue Dragon Film Awards	2008	Best Art Direction	Cho Hwa-sung	Won
Blue Dragon Film Awards	2008	Best Music	Dalpalan, Jang Young-gyu	Nominated
Blue Dragon Film Awards	2008	Technical Award	DTI	Nominated
Blue Dragon Film Awards	2008	Audience Choice Award for Most Popular Film	The Good, the Bad, the Weird	Won
Buil Film Awards	2008	Best Actor	Jung Woo-sung	Nominated
Buil Film Awards	2008	Best Supporting Actor	Song Young-chang	Nominated
Buil Film Awards	2008	Best Cinematography	Lee Mo-gae	Won
Buil Film Awards	2008	Best Editing	Nam Na-yeong	Nominated
Buil Film Awards	2008	Best Art Direction	Cho Hwa-sung	Won
Buil Film Awards	2008	Best Music	Dalpalan, Jang Young-gyu	Nominated
Buil Film Awards	2008	Technical Award	Jeong Do-an	Won
Buil Film Awards	2008	Special Jury Prize	Ji Jung-hyeon	Won
Buil Film Awards	2008	Buil Readers' Jury Award	The Good, the Bad, the Weird	Nominated
Director's Cut Awards	2008	Best Director	Kim Jee-woon	Won
Grand Bell Awards	2009	Best Cinematography	Lee Mo-gae	Nominated
Grand Bell Awards	2009	Best Editing	Nam Na-yeong	Nominated
Grand Bell Awards	2009	Best Art Direction	Cho Hwa-sung	Nominated
Grand Bell Awards	2009	Best Costume Design	Kwon Yu-jin	Won
Grand Bell Awards	2009	Best Visual Effects	Kim Wook	Nominated
Grand Bell Awards	2009	Best Sound Effects	Kim Kyung-tae	Nominated
Hawaii International Film Festival	2008	Maverick Award	Kim Jee-woon	Won
Hawaii International Film Festival	2008	Best Supporting Actor	Jung Woo-sung	Won
Korean Film Awards	2008	Best Director	Kim Jee-woon	Nominated
Korean Film Awards	2008	Best Actor	Song Kang-ho	Nominated
Korean Film Awards	2008	Best Cinematography	Lee Mo-gae	Won
Korean Film Awards	2008	Best Art Direction	Cho Hwa-sung	Won
Korean Film Awards	2008	Best Music	Dalpalan, Jang Young-gyu	Nominated
Korean Film Awards	2008	Best Sound	Kim Kyung-tae	Won
Sitges Film Festival	2008	Best Film	The Good, the Bad, the Weird	Nominated
Sitges Film Festival	2008	Best Director	Kim Jee-woon	Won
Sitges Film Festival	2008	Best Special Effects	Jeong Do-an	Won
