= Illang: The Wolf Brigade =

2018 film by Kim Jee-woon

- Theatrical poster
- Hangul: 인랑
- Hanja: 人狼
- Lit.: Human-Wolf
- RR: Illang
- MR: Illang
- Directed by: Kim Jee-woon
- Screenplay by: Kim Jee-woon; Jeon Cheol-hong
- Based on: Jin-Roh: The Wolf Brigade and characters created by Mamoru Oshii
- Produced by: Kim Woo-sang
- Starring: Gang Dong-won; Han Hyo-joo; Jung Woo-sung; Kim Mu-yeol; Han Ye-ri; Choi Min-ho
- Cinematography: Lee Mo-gae
- Edited by: Yang Jin-mo
- Music by: Mowg
- Production company: Lewis Pictures
- Distributed by: Warner Bros. Pictures
- Release date: July 25, 2018
- Running time: 138 minutes
- Country: South Korea
- Language: Korean
- Budget: US$17 million
- Box office: US$6.2 million

Illang: The Wolf Brigade (Korean: 인랑; also known as Inrang) is a 2018 South Korean science fiction action film directed by Kim Jee-woon and starring Gang Dong-won, Han Hyo-joo, Jung Woo-sung and Kim Mu-yeol. It is a live action adaptation of the 1999 Japanese animated film Jin-Roh: The Wolf Brigade, itself based on Mamoru Oshii's manga Kerberos Panzer Cop and his wider Kerberos Saga.

Unlike the alternate history postwar Japan setting of its source material, Illang is set in 2029 Korea, when North Korea and South Korea are preparing to reunify after heightening tensions in East Asia lead to destabilization and the rise of an anti-reunification terrorist group known as "the Sect". The South Korean government establishes the "Special Unit", a counterterrorist paramilitary law enforcement agency that is tasked with battling the Sect. The film follows Special Unit soldier Lim Joong-kyung who, after witnessing a young terrorist kill herself to evade capture, befriends Lee Yun-hee, a girl who claims to be the terrorist's sister; together, they attempt to navigate an increasingly violent interservice rivalry within South Korea's counterterrorist apparatus.

Illang was released on July 25, 2018. Distributed by Warner Bros. Korea, the film received mixed reviews and underperformed at the domestic box office, selling around 897,000 tickets against its break-even point of six million tickets and only earning 8 billion won (US$6.2 million) on its 19 billion won (US$17 million) budget. The film competed in the 66th San Sebastián International Film Festival for the Golden Shell, becoming the second South Korean film to do so.

== Plot ==
In 2024, political and territorial disputes between China, Japan, and South Korea lead to Japan remilitarizing and the United States and Russia moving to secure their interests in East Asia. Fearing the possibility of war, North and South Korea agree to reunify for the sake of survival within five years. However, this leads the other aforementioned powers, who oppose the reunification, to impose significant tariffs against the Koreas, sparking an economic depression that causes pro-reunification sentiment to plummet and leads to spikes in civil unrest, crime, and terrorism. With anti-reunification movements swelling to the point of the formation of the domestic terrorist group "the Sect", the South Korean government, seeing the National Police Agency is unable to handle the protests and terrorism alone, forms the Special Unit to counter the Sect, heavily arming and equipping its soldiers with futuristic powered exoskeletons and distinctive gas masks with glowing red lenses. Though the Special Unit is effective in crushing the Sect, an incident a year after their formation known as "Bloody Friday"—when a Special Unit team mistook young schoolgirls for Sect terrorists during a raid, killing 15 of them—sparks massive backlash and forces Special Unit soldiers to always wear their gas masks on deployment to protect their identities. Additionally, the Special Unit finds themselves at odds with the Public Security Department, an intelligence unit that wishes to dissolve the Special Unit.

In 2029, an anti-reunification protest at Gwanghwamun Plaza in Seoul turns violent when Sect terrorists attack riot police lines with firearms and satchel charges, killing several outgunned officers as well as protestors in the crossfire. The Special Unit is deployed to defeat the terrorists and raids their hideout in the storm sewers below, killing most of the Sect terrorists when they refuse to surrender. Special Unit soldier Lim Joong-kyung confronts Lee Jae-hee, a young Sect courier carrying a satchel charge, and attempts to coax her into surrendering, but she detonates it instead, killing herself. News of the incident damages the Special Unit's reputation even further, and a shaken Lim is sent back to training for reevaluation under drill instructor Jang Jin-tae.

Lim is contacted by Public Security head Han Sang-woo, who informs him that the deceased courier has a sister, Lee Yun-hee. Lim meets Yun-hee at the Namsan Tower; she tells him she does not hold Lim responsible for her sister's death as they were merely fighting on opposing sides, and they quickly befriend each other. Unbeknownst to Lim, Yun-hee is actually a former Sect courier who, to avoid a prison sentence and to secure a medical operation for her ill brother, has reluctantly been roped into working with Han and Public Security in their plot to discredit the Special Unit; however, the Special Unit is secretly already aware of this, and an internal deep-cover group known as "Illang" ("Wolf Brigade" in English) is seeking to protect them from Public Security.

Yun-hee is captured and interrogated by Illang member Kim Cheol-jin, and reveals that the Sect is being funded by Public Security and that she was blackmailed into killing for them. Yun-hee is released and goes to the location of Public Security's trap at the Namsan Tower, where she is to incriminate Lim while carrying a tracking device for undercover Public Security agents to arrest him; however, Lim is alerted to the agents' presence, kills them, and escapes with Yun-hee. After escaping, Lim sends Han photographic evidence of Han's involvement with the Sect, prompting Public Security to launch a manhunt for them, while the Special Unit raids a government building in retaliation for Public Security's activities. Lim and Yun-hee attempt to reach a safe house to meet with Illang and their leader, Jang, but they are unable to reach it and take refuge in the sewers instead, while Kim is captured, brutally interrogated, and accidentally killed by Han. While in the sewers, Yun-hee activates her tracking device, alerting Han and Public Security who dispatch their own special forces squads to her location. Illang arrives and provides Lim with a Special Unit exoskeleton and machine gun before taking Yun-hee—revealed to actually be Kim Seo-hee, former commander of the Sect's women's unit—to safety. The Public Security squads and Han converge on the location of Yun-hee's tracking device but are met by a fully armed and armored Lim, who kills the squads and Han in a lengthy shootout.

Lim reunites with Seo-hee and the rest of Illang, but Jang orders him to execute Seo-hee, as she is still a terrorist who spied for Public Security. However, Lim refuses and frees her when Jang departs. Expecting this to happen, Jang lets Seo-hee live and returns to battle Lim for his betrayal, but allows him to leave when Lim announces he is retiring from the Special Unit. Later, Seo-hee and her brother board a train to leave Seoul; as the train departs, Seo-hee looks out the window and sees Lim.

== Cast ==
- Gang Dong-won as Lim Joong-kyung
  - English ver. voiced by Johnny Yong Bosch
- Han Hyo-joo as Lee Yoon-hee / Kim Seo-hee
  - English ver. voiced by Desirée Mee Jung
- Jung Woo-sung as Jang Jin-tae
  - English ver. voiced by West Liang
- Kim Mu-yeol as Han Sang-woo
  - English ver. voiced by Greg Chun
- Han Ye-ri as Koo Mi-kyung
  - English ver. voice by Erika Ishii
- Choi Min-ho as Kim Cheol-jin
  - English ver. voiced by Matthew Yang King (credited as Matt King)
- Shin Eun-soo as Lee Jae-hee
- Choi Jin-ho as Chief Presidential Secretary Bak Jeong-gi
  - English ver. voiced by Edward Hong
- Ok Ja-yeon as Illang 5
- Park Joo-hee as Hong Jung-hee
- Shim So-young as Sect Team 1 member
- Kim Ye-eun as Namsan Tower Cafe's employee
- Moon Ye-won as Splendid costume lady
- Park Hyung-soo as Barber
- Kim Hyun-joon as Illang
- Jeon Jin-seo as Kim Yeo-min, Lee Yoon-hee's younger brother
- Huh Joon-ho as Lee Gi-Seok (special appearance)
  - English ver. voiced by Todd Haberkorn
- Park Byung-eun as Inspector General (cameo)

== Production ==
The film was financed by Union Investment Partners, with production being announced in 2013. Filming began on August 16, 2017, in Studio Cube, a South Korean filming complex, and completed on March 23, 2018.

Costumes for the film were designed by Hollywood artist Vanessa Lee, who also worked on the special effects costume for the 2006 film Underworld: Evolution and superhero costumes in the Avengers film series.

Webtoon writer Yoon Tae-ho penned a prequel titled Illang: Prequel, which took place five years before the events of the film. It was developed by Kakao Pages and Daum Webtoon and was released on June 27, 2018, beginning a weekly run of chapters that led up to the film's release on July 25.

== Release ==
Illang: The Wolf Brigade was released in South Korea on July 25, 2018. Netflix acquired the international distribution rights of the film, and was available on its platform for streaming until May 2023.

The film was selected to compete at the 66th San Sebastián International Film Festival, which was held from September 21–29, 2018. It was Kim Jee-woon's second film to compete at the festival after I Saw the Devil in 2010. Kim and lead actor Gang Dong-won were set to attend the event.

A red carpet and showcase event for the film was held on July 18, 2018, at Times Square Mall in Yeongdeungpo District with the attendance of the director and cast.

== Reception ==
=== Critical response ===
Mamoru Oshii, the writer of the screenplay which the film is based on, attended a special screening and commented, "I think this is a powerful movie that provokes lots of thought ... The balance between the realistic locations and the futuristic technologies like iron armor and diverse guns was very impressive."

As per Yonhap review, the film "spent so much time trying to recreate the world from the animated movie and remakes it into a big-scale action blockbuster that it never got the simple things right... the film falls short of properly delivering the intense inner conflict felt by Joong-kyung."

Jason Bechervaise from Screendaily wrote that the film "contains moments of stylistic brilliance through some compelling set-pieces. Yet moving the story from Japan to a Korean peninsula which is on the point of reunifying in 2029 results in a film which is both over-plotted and melodramatic."

=== Box office ===
On the first day of its release, the film attracted 274,525 admissions. After five days of release, Illang: The Wolf Brigade earned a total of US$5.29 million.

The film was made on a US$17.0 million budget and targeted to attract around 6 million moviegoers. However, due to negative reviews from both critics and audience members, the film screened for only three weeks, and ended up attracting a total of 897,254 moviegoers, grossing US$6.2 million. The number of South Korean film admissions in July 2018 dropped by 21.4% from 2017, to 5.39 million, due to the sluggishness of this film and the absence of intermediate films to replace it. The number of South Korean film admissions in July 2018 was the lowest since 2008.

== Awards and nominations ==
Awards	Category	Recipient	Result	Ref.
Asian Project Market Awards	The Busan Award	Illang: The Wolf Brigade	Won	
27th Buil Film Awards	Best Cinematography	Lee Mo-gae	Nominated	
27th Buil Film Awards	Best Art Direction	Jo Hwa-sung	Nominated	
55th Grand Bell Awards	Best Art Direction	Jo Hwa-sung	Nominated	
55th Grand Bell Awards	Best Lighting	Lee Sung-hwan	Nominated	
55th Grand Bell Awards	Best Costume Design	Jo Sang-kyung	Won	
55th Grand Bell Awards	Technical Award	Illang: The Wolf Brigade	Nominated	
39th Blue Dragon Film Awards	Best Cinematography and Lightning	Illang: The Wolf Brigade	Nominated	
39th Blue Dragon Film Awards	Best Art Direction	Illang: The Wolf Brigade	Nominated	
