= Baeksang Arts Award Grand Prize – Film =

Korean annual film award

- 2026 recipient: Yoo Hae-jin
- Country: South Korea
- Presented by: Baeksang Arts Awards
- Most recent winner: Yoo Hae-jin; The King's Warden (2026)
- Website: baeksangartsawards

The Baeksang Arts Award Grand Prize – Film (Korean: 백상예술대상 영화부문 대상; RR: Baeksang Yesul Daesang Yeonghwabumun Daesang) is an award presented annually at the Baeksang Arts Awards ceremony organised by Ilgan Sports and JTBC Plus, affiliates of JoongAng Ilbo, usually in the second quarter of each year in Seoul. It is considered the highest honor in the film division of the ceremony. The candidates are chosen from the list of nominees in the film division each year and are not announced prior to the ceremony. Until 1979, the Grand Prize was chosen from either categories (film, theatre or, from 1974, television), after that, each category awarded its own grand prize.

== List of winners ==
Table key
‡	Indicates the winner

No prize (**) was awarded in 1982, 1991, 1997, 1998. The other empty entries indicate that the prize was awarded to theatrical play (*).

Year	Winner	Film	Original title
1965 (1st)	Kim Jin-kyu (actor) ‡	Deaf Sam-yong	벙어리 삼룡이
1966 (2nd)		*	천사여 고향을 보아라
1967 (3rd)		Late Autumn ‡	만추
1968 (4th)	Choi Nam-hyun (actor) ‡	Legend of Ssarigol	싸리골의 신화
1969 (5th)		*	사할린리스크의 하늘과 땅 ‡
1970 (6th)		*	고도를 기다리며 ‡
1971 (7th)		*	허생전 ‡
1972 (8th)		*	슬픈 카페의 노래 ‡
1973 (9th)		Gate of Women ‡	홍살문
1974 (10th)		*	초분 ‡
1975 (11th)		*	남한산성 ‡
1976 (12th)		*	유랑극단 ‡
1977 (13th)		Concentration of Attention ‡	집념
1978 (14th)		A Splendid Outing ‡	화려한 외출
1979 (15th)		The Last Words from a Comrade in Arms ‡	전우가 남긴 한마디
1980 (16th)		Man-suk, Run! ‡	달려라 만석아
1981 (17th)		A Fine, Windy Day ‡	바람불어 좋은 날
1982 (18th)		**	
1983 (19th)		Village in the Mist ‡	안개마을
1984 (20th)		Whale Hunting ‡	고래사냥
1985 (21st)		Deep Blue Night ‡	깊고 푸른 밤
1986 (22nd)		Gilsoddeum ‡	길소뜸
1987 (23rd)		Moonlight Hunter ‡	달빛 사냥꾼
1988 (24th)		Adada ‡	아다다
1989 (25th)		Seoul Rainbow ‡	서울 무지개
1990 (26th)		The Lovers of Woomook-baemi ‡	우묵배미의 사랑
1991 (27th)		**	
1992 (28th)		Stairways of Heaven ‡	천국의 계단
1993 (29th)		Our Twisted Hero ‡	우리들의 일그러진 영웅
1994 (30th)	Ahn Sung-ki (actor) ‡	Two Cops	투캅스
1995 (31st)		Life and Death of the Hollywood Kid ‡	헐리우드 키드의 생애
1996 (32nd)	Park Chul-soo (director) ‡	Farewell My Darling	학생부군신위
1997 (33rd)		**	
1998 (34th)		**	
1999 (35th)	Kang Je-gyu (director) ‡	Shiri	쉬리
2000 (36th)		Chunhyang ‡	춘향뎐
2001 (37th)		Libera Me ‡	리베라 메
2002 (38th)	Sul Kyung-gu (actor) ‡	Public Enemy	공공의 적
2003 (39th)		The Way Home ‡	집으로...
2004 (40th)	Kang Woo-suk (director) ‡	Silmido	실미도
2005 (41st)		Marathon ‡	말아톤
2006 (42nd)		King and the Clown ‡	왕의 남자
2007 (43rd)		Tazza: The High Rollers ‡	타짜
2008 (44th)		The Chaser ‡	추격자
2009 (45th)	Kang Woo-suk (director) ‡	Public Enemy Returns	강철중: 공공의 적 1-1
2010 (46th)	Yoon Je-kyoon (director) ‡	Tidal Wave	해운대
2011 (47th)	Lee Byung-hun (actor) ‡	I Saw the Devil	악마를 보았다
2012 (48th)		Nameless Gangster: Rules of the Time ‡	범죄와의 전쟁: 나쁜놈들 전성시대
2013 (49th)	Ryu Seung-ryong (actor) ‡	Miracle in Cell No. 7	7번방의 선물
2014 (50th)	Song Kang-ho (actor) ‡	The Attorney	변호인
2015 (51st)	Choi Min-sik (actor) ‡	The Admiral: Roaring Currents	명량
2016 (52nd)	Lee Joon-ik (director) ‡	Dongju: The Portrait of a Poet; The Throne	동주 사도
2017 (53rd)	Park Chan-wook (director and co-screenwriter) ‡	The Handmaiden	아가씨
2018 (54th)		1987: When the Day Comes ‡	1987
2019 (55th)	Jung Woo-sung (actor) ‡	Innocent Witness	증인
2020 (56th)	Bong Joon-ho (director and co-screenwriter) ‡	Parasite	기생충
2021 (57th)	Lee Joon-ik (director) ‡	The Book of Fish	자산어보
2022 (58th)	Ryoo Seung-wan (director) ‡	Escape from Mogadishu	모가디슈
2023 (59th)		Decision to Leave ‡	헤어질 결심
2024 (60th)	Kim Sung-su (director) ‡	12.12: The Day	서울의 봄
2025 (61st)	Hong Kyung-pyo (cinematographer) ‡	Harbin	하얼빈
2026 (62nd)	Yoo Hae-jin (actor) ‡	The King's Warden	왕과 사는 남자

== Multiple wins ==
Wins	Winner
2	Kang Woo-suk (director)
2	Lee Joon-ik (director)

== Sources ==
- "Baeksang Arts Awards Nominees and Winners Lists". Naver Movie (in Korean).
- "Baeksang Arts Awards Winners Lists". Baeksang Arts Awards (in Korean).
