= Lee Mo-gae =

South Korean cinematographer

- Occupation: Cinematographer
- Years active: 2003–present
- Notable work: A Tale of Two Sisters, April Snow, Traces of Love

Korean name
- Hangul: 이모개
- RR: I Mogae
- MR: I Mogae

Lee Mo-gae is a South Korean Asia Pacific Screen Award-winning cinematographer known for his work in A Tale of Two Sisters (2003), The Good, the Bad, the Weird (2008), I Saw the Devil (2010), Asura: The City of Madness (2016), Hunt (2022), and 12.12: The Day (2023).

== Filmography ==
=== Feature films ===
Feature film credits
Year	Title		Director	Ref.
Year	English	Korean	Director	Ref.
2003	A Tale of Two Sisters	장화, 홍련	Kim Jee-woon	
2004	The Last Wolf	마지막 늑대	Koo Ja-Hong	
2004	Springtime	꽃피는 봄이 오면	Ryu Jang-ha	
2005	April Snow	외출	Hur Jin-ho	
2006	Traces of Love	가을로	Kim Dae-seung	
2008	The Good, the Bad, the Weird	좋은 놈, 나쁜 놈, 이상한 놈	Kim Jee-woon	
2010	Secret Reunion	의형제	Jang Hoon	
2010	I Saw the Devil	악마를 보았다	Kim Jee-woon	
2011	My Way	마이웨이	Kang Je-gyu	
2013	The Flu	감기	Kim Sung-su	
2013	Way Back Home	집으로 가는 길	Bang Eun-jin	
2014	No Tears for the Dead	우는 남자	Lee Jeong-beom	
2015	C'est si bon	쎄시봉	Kim Hyun-seok	
2015	The Tiger	대호	Park Hoon-jung	
2016	The Age of Shadows	밀정	Kim Jee-woon	
2016	Asura: The City of Madness	아수라	Kim Sung-su	
2017	The Battleship Island	군함도	Ryoo Seung-wan	
2018	Illang: The Wolf Brigade	인랑	Kim Jee-woon	
2019	Bring Me Home	나를 찾아줘	Kim Seung-woo	
2019	Forbidden Dream	천문: 하늘에 묻는다	Hur Jin-ho	
2021	Seo Bok	서복	Lee Yong-ju	
2022	Emergency Declaration	비상선언	Han Jae-rim	
2022	Hunt	헌트	Lee Jung-jae	
2023	12.12: The Day	서울의 봄	Kim Sung-su	
2024	Exhuma	파묘	Jang Jae-hyun	
2025	Yadang: The Snitch	야당	Hwang Byeong-guk	

== Accolades ==
=== Awards and nominations ===
Name of the award ceremony, year presented, award category, recipient(s) of the award, and the result of the nomination
Award	Year	Category	Nominated work	Result	Ref.
Asian Film Awards	2024	Best Cinematography	12.12: The Day	Nominated	
Baeksang Arts Awards	2023	Technical Award	Hunt	Won	
Baeksang Arts Awards	2024	Technical Award	12.12: The Day	Nominated	
Blue Dragon Film Awards	2022	Best Cinematography and Lighting	Hunt	Won	
Buil Film Awards	2018	Best Cinematography	Illang: The Wolf Brigade	Nominated	
Busan Film Critics Association Awards	2022	Technical Award	Hunt	Won	
Grand Bell Awards	2022	Best Cinematography	Hunt	Nominated	
Grand Bell Awards	2022	Best Cinematography	Emergency Declaration	Nominated	
Korean Film Producers Association Award	2022	Filmmaking, Arts, and Editing Awards	Hunt	Won	

=== Listicles ===
Name of publisher, year listed, name of listicle, and placement
Publisher	Year	Listicle	Placement	Ref.
Korean Cinematographers Guild	2018	21 Cinematographers with excellent cinematography	Placed	
