= City of the Rising Sun =

- Theatrical release poster
- Hangul: 태양은 없다
- Hanja: 太陽은 없다
- RR: Taeyangeun eopda
- MR: T'aeyangŭn ŏpta
- Directed by: Kim Sung-su
- Written by: Sam Shin; Kim Sung-su
- Produced by: Cha Seung-jae
- Starring: Jung Woo-sung; Lee Jung-jae
- Cinematography: Kim Hyung-koo
- Edited by: Kim Hyeon
- Music by: Park Young; Kim Jae-won
- Release date: January 9, 1999 (South Korea)
- Running time: 101 minutes
- Country: South Korea
- Language: Korean

City of the Rising Sun (Korean: 태양은 없다; RR: Taeyangeun eopda) is a 1999 South Korean drama film directed by Kim Sung-su, starring Jung Woo-sung and Lee Jung-jae. It follows two friends, Hong-ki and Do-chul, in their mid-twenties struggling in life, set against the backdrop of late 1990s Korea. The film was released theatrically on January 9, 1999.

== Synopsis ==
Do-chul is a boxer who is forced to give up boxing due to his continuous series of losses. Jobless as he has given up the sport, he is introduced to a debt collecting agency where he meets and starts working with Hong-ki, a swindler, a con artist. Hong-ki believes that he can do everything with money, and frequently sees himself winning the lottery of life. As a gambler, he frequently bets on horse racing and loses all the money he has. The two become friends soon after they meet, although Hong-ki's swindling eventually makes Do-chul distrust Hong-ki and announce the end of their friendship. After a series of events that cause each one of them to lose everything they have, they become friends again and wish for a little hope watching the rising sun.

== Cast ==
- Jung Woo-sung as Do-chul
- Lee Jung-jae as Hong-ki
- Han Go-eun as Mimi
- Lee Beom-soo as Byeong-guk
- Park Ji-hun as Seong-hoon
- Lee Ki-yeol as Moon
- Han Sang-mi as Hong Gi-mo
- Kim Young-ho as Boxing trainer
- Lee Bong-gyu as Loan shark
- Kim Tae-hwan as Chang-min
