= Mutt Boy =

- Film poster
- Hangul: 똥개
- RR: Ttonggae
- MR: Ttongkae
- Directed by: Kwak Kyung-taek
- Written by: Kwak Kyung-taek; Kim Jang-woo
- Produced by: Jung Jong-seob
- Starring: Jung Woo-sung; Kim Kap-soo; Uhm Ji-won; Kim Tae-wook
- Cinematography: Hwang Ki-seok
- Edited by: Park Yu-kyeong
- Music by: Yun Min-hwa
- Distributed by: Show East
- Release date: July 16, 2003
- Running time: 103 minutes
- Country: South Korea
- Language: Korean

Mutt Boy (Korean: 똥개; lit. 'Shit dog') is a 2003 South Korean drama film directed by Kwak Kyung-taek. The film stars Jung Woo-sung as a developmentally disabled boy in a rural town whose fighting skills earn him a gang of followers but also constant run-ins with the law.

== Plot ==
Chul-min's family consists of himself, his police detective father, his sick mother, and a dog. Chul-min calls the dog "Mutt" or "Stray Dog," but his father calls Chul-min "Mutt" too. The dog is Chul-min's best friend. He doesn't cry when his mom dies, but he does get furious when his dog is eaten by the older boys in his soccer club. He takes his revenge, but his father's patrol car awaits him.

Although he now must live on his own, Chul-min wins renown as the one who beat up 21 people all by himself. Many of the town's thugs start to hang around Chul-min, fascinated by him, and he becomes a leader of small-time gangsters. One day his father takes in a young orphan named Jung-ae who was a thief. Eventually Chul-min and Jung-ae develop feelings for each other and Chul-min confronts the gang who killed his beloved dog.

== Cast ==
- Jung Woo-sung as Cha Chul-min
- Kim Kap-soo as Chul-min's father
- Uhm Ji-won as Kim Jung-ae
- Kim Jung-tae as Jin-mook
- Hong Ji-young as Soon-ja
- Yang Joon-kyung as Oh Deok-man
- Lee Soo-ho as Dae-deok
- Kim Sang-ho as Jang-son
- Park Sang-gyu as Detective Park
- Heo Wook as Gye-hwan
