= Remember You (film) =

- Theatrical release poster
- Hangul: 나를 잊지 말아요
- RR: Nareul itji marayo
- MR: Narŭl itchi marayo
- Directed by: Yoon-jung Lee
- Written by: Yoon-jung Lee
- Produced by: Jung Youn; Jo Young-wook
- Starring: Jung Woo-sung; Kim Ha-neul
- Cinematography: Woo Young-chang
- Edited by: Moon Sae-kyung
- Distributed by: CJ Entertainment
- Release date: January 7, 2016
- Running time: 106 minutes
- Country: South Korea
- Language: Korean
- Box office: US$2.8 million

Remember You (Korean: 나를 잊지 말아요; RR: Nareul itji marayo; lit. Don't Forget Me) is a 2016 South Korean romantic drama film written and directed by Yoon-jung Lee, in her directorial feature debut. It stars Jung Woo-sung and Kim Ha-neul. The film was released in South Korea on January 7, 2016.

== Plot ==
In the middle of the night, a man reports a missing person to the police office...himself. He has lost his memory. He can only remember from the moment he found himself left alone in an apartment. He tries to find any clue as to who he might be, but nothing comes out. When he plucks up the courage to go out, he meets a woman at a psychiatric hospital, whom immediately begins to cry upon seeing him. He begins to piece together the missing fragments of his memory, he reaches out to those he thinks might know him.

== Cast ==
- Jung Woo-sung as Yeon Seok-won, lawyer who has lost the past ten years of his memory due to an accident. As he struggles to resume his life, he becomes obsessed with piecing together the puzzle to find out his past and what led him to lose his memory.
- Kim Ha-neul as Kim Jin-young, woman who seemingly weeps upon seeing Seok-won when they first meet. They have an instant connection and a romance develops but she has a past that she keeps hidden.
- Bae Seong-woo as Oh Kwon-ho, Seok-won's best friend and fellow law firm partner who insists that Seok-won resume the case of defending one of their biggest clients despite his condition.
- Jang Young-nam as Kim Young-hee, client of Seok-won's' before his accident. She is on trial for the murder of her husband, but Seok-won is hesitant as there is something mysterious about his client and his past involvement with her case.
- Lim Ju-eun as Lee Bo-young, mysterious woman who Seok-won might have been linked to before his accident.
- Lee Jun-hyeok as Shin Hyun-ho, insurance salesman and acquaintance of Seok-won who provides valuable clues about Seok-won's past.

=== Special appearance ===
- On Joo-wan as Kim Dong-gun, brother of Jin-young.
- Kwon Hae-hyo

== Production ==
Yoon-jung Lee wrote and directed a 25-minute short film titled Remember O Goddess in 2010, which originally starred Kim Jung-tae and Choi A-ra in the lead roles. When Lee wanted to expand the short into a feature-length film, she turned to crowdfunding website Kickstarter in May 2012. Lee initially asked for an investment of US$30,000, but 272 individuals donated a total of US$32,293. It was chosen as Indiewire's "Project of the Week" on May 8, 2012.

== Reception ==
The film grossed US$2.05 million on its opening in South Korea.
