= Musa (film) =

2001 film by Kim Seong-su

- Theatrical poster
- Hangul: 무사
- Hanja: 武士
- RR: Musa
- MR: Musa
- Directed by: Kim Sung-su
- Written by: Kim Sung-su
- Produced by: Cha Seung-jae; Shang Xia
- Starring: Ahn Sung-ki; Jung Woo-sung; Joo Jin-mo; Zhang Ziyi
- Cinematography: Kim Hyung-koo
- Edited by: Kim Hyeon
- Music by: Shirō Sagisu
- Distributed by: CJ Entertainment
- Release date: September 7, 2001
- Running time: 158 minutes 133 minutes (international version)
- Country: South Korea
- Languages: Korean; Mandarin
- Budget: US$8 million

Musa (Korean: 무사; RR: Musa), released as both The Warrior and The Ultimate Warrior in English-speaking countries, is a 2001 South Korean epic action drama film directed by Kim Sung-su, starring Jung Woo-sung, Ahn Sung-ki, Joo Jin-mo and Chinese actress Zhang Ziyi. The semi-historical story follows the adventures of a Korean peace delegation as they try to get back to Korea through the inhospitable deserts of northern China.

The film is regarded as being one of the biggest motion pictures in the history of South Korean cinema. At the time of its production, its budget was the largest ever for a Korean film. It features a high degree of historical accuracy in period costumery, props, settings and most unusually, language; that is, everyone speaks in their native tongues or through an interpreter conversant in a lingua franca. The film was the eighth highest-grossing film of 2001 with over two million tickets sold.

== Plot ==
In 1375, a small diplomatic mission from the Korean kingdom Goryeo travels to Ming China to meet the Hongwu Emperor, but they are arrested in retaliation for the death of a Chinese diplomat in Goryeo. They are put in chains and taken across a desert. However, Mongol raiders suddenly show up and kill the Chinese soldiers transporting them, while killing some Koreans in the process. The Mongols ride off, leaving the rest of the Koreans to die of hunger or thirst.

The head of the Korean soldiers in the group, General Choi-Jung, takes command because the two diplomats are dead. Later, they discover that the Mongols have kidnapped the Hongwu Emperor's daughter so they ambush the Mongol convoy and rescue the princess. Yeo-sol, a former slave of one of the diplomats, defeats the Mongol general Rambulwha in single combat, but allows the latter to live and escape.

The Koreans flee with the princess, determined to return her safely to the Chinese capital, Nanjing, to atone for their diplomatic failure. The Mongols give chase in the hope of recovering the princess and presenting her to their Khan while the Koreans head towards a coastal fortress the princess tells them about, where they expect to find safe haven. Along the way, the Koreans pick up some Chinese peasants who are also fleeing from the Mongols.

Fighting their way through Mongol search parties, the group experiences many internal conflicts stemming from social class, love, and honour. The lower-class soldiers chafe under their poor treatment in comparison to the soldiers of the upper-class. They have little confidence in their young general, and prefer taking orders from their veteran sergeant, Dae-Jung. The princess has difficulty adjusting to the rough necessities of her position on the run. Choi-Jung and Yeo-sol become nemeses, competing for the affections of the princess and exchanging blows on several occasions.

When the group finally reaches the fortress, they are disappointed to see that it is nothing more than abandoned ruins. At the same time, the Mongols have caught up with them and have set up a camp outside the fortress. As the Koreans prepare to make a last stand, the princess attempts to give herself up to the Mongols in exchange for peace, but Yeo-sol and Choi-Jung stop her. A fight breaks out between the two men and the Mongols, resulting in Yeo-sol being captured. Rambulwha, who is impressed with Yeo-sol's skill, offers to let the latter join his army but Yeo-sol refuses and returns to the fortress to help his fellows. In the final battle, the defenders' gunpowder traps backfire when the Mongols launch a fire attack and stage a raid on the fortress. Yeo-sol sacrifices himself to save the princess while Choi-Jung and Rambulwha kill each other. All the Koreans perish along with their Mongol enemies, except for Dae-Jung. The princess stays with the peasants at the fortress and promises to tell her father of the Koreans' sacrifice while Dae-Jung builds a makeshift raft and sails back to Goryeo.

== Cast ==
- Jung Woo-sung as Yeo-sol, a hot-headed but loyal former slave who is skilled in using polearms
- Ahn Sung-ki as Dae-Jung, a veteran archer and sergeant of the lower-class soldiers
- Joo Jin-mo as Choi-Jung, the inexperienced general of the mission
- Zhang Ziyi as Princess Bu-yong (Princess Furong), a kidnapped Chinese princess
- Yu Rongguang as Rambulwha, the honourable but cruel Mongol general
- Park Jung-hak as Ga-nam, the experienced lieutenant of the upper-class soldiers
- Park Yong-woo as Ju-myeong, a cowardly interpreter
- Lee Doo-il as Ji-san, a burly Buddhist monk
- Yoo Hae-jin as Du-chung, an axe-wielding soldier who loses an eye
- Han Young-mok as Dan-saeng, a very young soldier
- Jung Suk-yong as Ha-il

== Historical context ==
The film presents a fictionalised account of a real Korean diplomatic mission sent to China in 1375. Chun-Yong Son was to present a herd of horses as gifts to the Hongwu Emperor but he and his party were reported to have been exiled and there was no record of their return to Korea. At the time, the Ming government was unhappy with Korea as the Korean government continued to acknowledge the Mongols as the legitimate rulers of China (this was true until 1378). Eventually the Koreans managed to gain favour with the Ming government and the relationship became very cordial.

The film also portrays the political conflicts in China at the time, between the fading Mongol-ruled Yuan dynasty and the new Ming dynasty that returned China to Han Chinese rule.

== Release ==
The 158-minute South Korean theatrical cut was edited and regraded to create a 133-minute international version, for distribution in various foreign markets. In the UK, the international version was further edited by 27 seconds to remove scenes of real animal cruelty, mainly involving deliberate horse falls. The same versions were later issued in the respective markets on DVD. As of September 2020, Musa has not been released anywhere on Blu-ray or in HD.
