= Hunt (2022 film) =

2022 South Korean spy action film by Lee Jung-jae

- Theatrical release poster
- Hangul: 헌트
- RR: Heonteu
- MR: Hŏnt'ŭ
- Directed by: Lee Jung-jae
- Written by: Lee Jung-jae; Jo Seung-hee
- Produced by: Lee Jung-jae; Han Jae-duk
- Starring: Lee Jung-jae; Jung Woo-sung; Jeon Hye-jin; Heo Sung-tae; Go Youn-jung
- Cinematography: Lee Mo-gae
- Edited by: Kim Sang-bum
- Music by: Jo Yeong-wook
- Production companies: Artist Studio; Sanai Pictures
- Distributed by: Megabox Plus M
- Release dates: May 19, 2022 (Cannes); August 10, 2022 (South Korea)
- Running time: 131 minutes
- Country: South Korea
- Language: Korean
- Budget: US$14 million
- Box office: US$33.8 million

Hunt (Korean: 헌트) is a 2022 South Korean spy action thriller film directed by Lee Jung-jae in his feature directorial debut. It stars Lee and Jung Woo-sung as NIS agents Park Pyong-ho and Kim Jung-do, who begin to suspect each other while hunting down a hidden spy within their organization, as they become entangled in a high-stakes operation known as South Korea's first assassination mission. The cast also includes Jeon Hye-jin, Heo Sung-tae, and Go Youn-jung in her film debut.

The film had its world premiere at the 2022 Cannes Film Festival in the Midnight Screenings section on 19 May 2022, and was released theatrically in South Korea on 10 August 2022.

== Plot ==
In the 1980s, when the military dictatorship reached its peak, South Korean Agency for National Security Planning (ANSP) Foreign Unit chief Park Pyong-ho and Domestic Unit Chief Kim Jung-do worked together in Washington D.C., protecting the dictorial President Chun Doo-hwan. While they are on patrol, the CIA notices a hired foreign assassination team and informs the Korean team about it. After an intense chase, Pyong-ho is taken hostage by the last survivor of the team. Jung-do shoots the assassin, and the men blame each other for the result.

After the incident in Washington, the director of ANSP tells Jung-do and Pyong-ho that there is a North Korean mole within ANSP known as Donglim. According to intel from the CIA, he is a dangerous spy from North Korea who is trying to assassinate the president of the South. Jung-do and Pyong-ho work to root out Donglim. Initially, a university professor held in captivity is suspected to be Donglim.

Jung-do and Pyong-ho work on the exfiltration of an asylum seeking North Korean nuclear physicist, who plans to defect with his family while they are in Japan.

The physicist reveals that Donglim is still free, and has leaked information about a military infiltration by South Korea that is taking place on the same day. The infiltration is expected by the North and ends in total failure and the death of everyone involved.

Pyong-ho's team leads the exfiltration operation, but because of conflicting orders, the operation ends in failure and the death of the physicist.

Afterwards, the two teams begin to pursue Donglim in their own way, both accusing each other. Captain Lee Ung-pyong of the North Korean Air Force defects to the South and is chastised by his interrogators about the shallow, selfish reasons for his treason. Jung-do suspects that Yoo-jeong is in fact a North Korean agent tasked with keeping an eye on him, and violently interrogates her.

After a long investigation, the men uncover the shocking truths about each other. Jung-do is part of a Southern uprising; he and his followers plan to assassinate the South Korean President for the Gwangju Democratic Movement, which resulted in the massacre of innocent civilians. Jung-do was also the client behind the assassination attempt in Washington D.C., and he shot the last assassin on purpose to prevent him from being interrogated.

Pyong-ho, on the other hand, is revealed to be Donglim. In desperation, Pyong-ho kills Joo-kyung and escapes Jung-do’s pursuing agents to meet his handler and to receive his orders. He is shocked to discover that the plan has changed, North plans to invade the South, and that he will be killed to prevent leaks. Jung-do saves Pyong-ho from his handlers, hides his identity from the ANSP, and brings him into the plan to assassinate the South Korean President in Bangkok, Thailand. Pyong-ho reluctantly agrees, but is worried because the assassination will be the signal for a military invasion by North Korea.

North Korean snipers and Jung-do attack the Presidential motorcade in Bangkok, but are stopped by Pyong-ho, while Jung-do desperately tries to assassinate the president with his own hands. Meanwhile, a planted North Korean agent detonates a bomb as a last resort; however, it fails to kill the President who manages to escape the explosion. Jung-do is caught up in the explosion and dies.

After the incident in Thailand, Pyong-ho visits Jung-do's family to deliver a tribute, then goes south to meet with Yoo-jeong and offer her an escape to America. However, he is ambushed at the scene by other North Korean agents, as it is revealed that she was indeed a North Korean agent. As he dies, she sees the fake passport Pyong-ho made for her, where the fake name held his surname, revealing how he cared for her and considered her to be his own. She goes on to shoot and kill at least one of the agents on scene, with other shots being heard off-camera, likely taking his advice to flee the country.

== Cast ==
- Lee Jung-jae as Park Pyong-ho
- Jung Woo-sung as Kim Jung-do
- Jeon Hye-jin as Bang Joo-kyung
- Heo Sung-tae as Jang Cheol-seong
- Go Youn-jung as Jo Yoo-jeong
- Kim Jong-soo as Director Ahn
- Jung Man-sik as Agent Yang
- Kang Kyung-hun as Kim Jeong-do's wife
- Park Sung-woong as Tokyo branch agent 1
- Jo Woo-jin as Tokyo branch agent 2
- Kim Nam-gil as Tokyo branch agent 3
- Ju Ji-hoon as Tokyo branch agent 4
- Hwang Jung-min as Lieutenant Lee
- Lee Sung-min as Jo Won-sik
- Yoo Jae-myung as CEO Choi
- Lee Chae-eun as Yang Bo-sung's daughter
- Song Duk-ho as Student

== Production ==
=== Development ===
The film was first titled Namsan in 2017 with Lee Jung-jae in the lead role, but he had to cancel the production before filming. Lee refined its script and prepared for 4 years. In addition to directing, starring and contributing to the screenplay, he also co-produced the film.

=== Filming ===
Filming began on May 8, 2021, and concluded on November 13, 2021.

=== Post-production ===
On August 3, 2022, Lee revealed that he re-edited the film after its Cannes screening and the new version was screened at the Toronto International Film Festival for its North American premiere. However the original was to be used for the theatrical release in South Korea.

To help global audiences get a better understanding of the political era depicted in the film, Lee revised several key lines and scenes which required some actors to re-record their dialogue. He said "When writing the script of 'Hunt,' I set younger generations in South Korea who learn about the era from history textbooks as the target audience. I thought foreign viewers would be the same,... But at Cannes, about 30% of foreign media reviews complained that it was hard for them to keep up with the story, as they didn't know about Korean politics in the 1980s."

=== Historical background ===
The film deals with three major historical events in the 1980s; the May 18 Gwangju Democratization Movement (1980), the defection of North Korean pilot Lee Woong-pyung (1983), and the Aung San terrorist attack (1983).

== Release ==
The film premiered at the 75th Cannes Film Festival on May 19, 2022, at the Lumière Theater, where it received a seven-minute standing ovation. It was released in theaters on August 10, 2022, by Megabox. The film's distribution rights were pre-sold to 207 territories. The film was invited to 2022 Toronto International Film Festival and was screened at the Gala Presentations section in September 2022. Magnolia Pictures acquired the distribution rights for a U.S. theatrical release in December 2022 under the Magnet Releasing banner.

The film was scheduled to be available for streaming on Netflix from December 7, 2022, but has not been made available yet other than South Korea.

== Reception ==
=== Critical response ===
Hunt has an approval rating of 69% on review aggregator website Rotten Tomatoes, based on 54 reviews, and an average rating of 6/10. The website's critical consensus states: "Although it frequently forsakes action in favor of a needlessly knotty narrative, Hunt has enough thrills to satisfy more forgiving espionage fans" . On Metacritic, the film has a weighted average score of 52 out of 100, based on 11 critics, indicating "mixed or average reviews".

==== International ====
Pete Hammond in his review for Deadline praised the direction, cinematography and performance of main and supporting cast. Peter Debruge writing for Variety described Hunt as a "long but lightning-paced film with a jolt of adrenaline" and appreciated Lee's direction and acting. Lou Thomas of BFI wrote that the film is packed with "thrillingly violent action scenes and jaw-dropping shocks" but "Lee occasionally forgets to keep things comprehensible or believable" and called the movie fun to watch. David Rooney writing for The Hollywood Reporter stated that the film lacks character depth and storytelling coherence and called it "an increasingly frustrating movie that loses its way amid a dense thicket of plot complications, double-dealings, counterplans and surprise revelations." David Ehrlich of IndieWire graded the film as C, described it as "hopelessly convoluted espionage thriller that doesn't tell a story" and stated "Lee's debut is little more than a chattering Pez dispenser full of plot twists." In his review for South China Morning Post, Clarence Tsui wrote that the film is "excessively bombastic and muddled" except for history junkies and hardcore action-movie fans, called the storyline messy and confusing for audiences who are unfamiliar with the historical setting of the film, and gave 2 stars out of 5.

==== South Korean ====
Kim Seon-woo reviewing for JTBC praised the film's great visuals, detailed mise-en-scène, and spectacular action scenes and added that the large and small reversals in the plot maintain the tension of the film until the very end. Choi Young-joo of No Cut News stated, "although it is called an espionage action genre, it is regrettable that the center of gravity is focused on the rushing 'action' rather than 'espionage' that goes back and forth in suspicion" but praised the film's sounds, sets and props that made the audience feel the atmosphere of the 1980s and the direction of Lee who reached his goal with a formidable theme and content. Song Kyung-won of Cine21 outlined the film as "a film that takes a motif from a true story, but makes the most of the historical imagination, and is essentially focused on action rather than espionage" and concluded, "Despite some expediency that fills in the holes in the narrative, it is a decent debut that blends historical imagination and commercial achievements."

=== Box office ===
The film was released on 1548 screens on August 11, 2022, in South Korea. The opening recorded 210,000 admissions and topped the South Korean box office. The film surpassed 1 million admissions in 4 days of release and 2 million admissions in 7 days of release. On the 12th day, Hunt became the third South Korean film in 2022 to cross 3 million admissions. On the 25th day, it surpassed 4 million admissions.

As of September 12, 2022, it is the fourth-highest-grossing Korean film of 2022 with gross of US$33,814,228 and 4,352,407 admissions.

=== Accolades ===
Award	Year	Category	Recipient(s)	Result	Ref.
Baeksang Arts Awards	2023	Best Film	Hunt	Nominated	
Baeksang Arts Awards	2023	Best Director	Lee Jung-jae	Nominated	
Baeksang Arts Awards	2023	Best New Director	Lee Jung-jae	Nominated	
Baeksang Arts Awards	2023	Best Actor	Lee Jung-jae	Nominated	
Baeksang Arts Awards	2023	Best Actor	Jung Woo-sung	Nominated	
Baeksang Arts Awards	2023	Best New Actress	Go Youn-jung	Nominated	
Baeksang Arts Awards	2023	Best Screenplay	Lee Jung-jae, Jo Seung-hee	Nominated	
Baeksang Arts Awards	2023	Technical Award	Lee Mo-gae	Won	
Blue Dragon Film Awards	2022	Best New Director	Lee Jung-jae	Won	
Blue Dragon Film Awards	2022	Best Cinematography and Lighting	Lee Mo-gae, Lee Sung-hwan	Won	
Blue Dragon Film Awards	2022	Best Director	Lee Jung-jae	Nominated	
Blue Dragon Film Awards	2022	Best Editing	Kim Sang-beom	Won	
Blue Dragon Film Awards	2022	Best Film	Hunt	Nominated	
Blue Dragon Film Awards	2022	Best Actor	Lee Jung-jae	Nominated	
Blue Dragon Film Awards	2022	Best Actor	Jung Woo-sung	Nominated	
Blue Dragon Film Awards	2022	Best Supporting Actress	Jeon Hye-jin	Nominated	
Blue Dragon Film Awards	2022	Best New Actress	Go Youn-jung	Nominated	
Blue Dragon Film Awards	2022	Best Screenplay	Lee Jung-jae, Cho Seung-hee	Nominated	
Blue Dragon Film Awards	2022	Best Music	Jo Yeong-wook	Nominated	
Blue Dragon Film Awards	2022	Best Art Direction	Park Il-hyan	Nominated	
Buil Film Awards	2022	Best New Director	Lee Jung-jae	Won	
Buil Film Awards	2022	Best Actor	Jung Woo-sung	Nominated	
Buil Film Awards	2022	Best Actor	Lee Jung-jae	Nominated	
Buil Film Awards	2022	Best Supporting Actor	Heo Sung-tae	Nominated	
Buil Film Awards	2022	Best Supporting Actress	Jeon Hye-jin	Nominated	
Buil Film Awards	2022	Best New Actress	Go Youn-jung	Nominated	
Buil Film Awards	2022	Best Screenplay	Lee Jung-jae, Cho Seung-hee	Nominated	
Buil Film Awards	2022	Best Art Direction	Park Il-hyan	Nominated	
23rd Busan Film Critics Association Awards	2022	Technical Award	Hunt	Won	
6th Canary Islands Fantastic Film Festival Ciudad de La Laguna, Isla Calavera	2022	Best Actor	Lee Jung-Jae and Jung Woo-sung	Won	
Grand Bell Awards	2022	Best Film	Hunt	Nominated	
Grand Bell Awards	2022	Best New Director	Lee Jung-jae	Nominated	
Grand Bell Awards	2022	Best Director	Lee Jung-jae	Nominated	
Grand Bell Awards	2022	Best Actor	Lee Jung-jae	Nominated	
Grand Bell Awards	2022	Best Actor	Jung Woo-sung	Nominated	
Grand Bell Awards	2022	Best Supporting Actress	Jeon Hye-jin	Nominated	
Grand Bell Awards	2022	Best New Actress	Go Youn-jung	Nominated	
Grand Bell Awards	2022	Best Screenplay	Lee Jung-jae, Jo Seung-hee	Nominated	
Grand Bell Awards	2022	Best Cinematography	Lee Mo-gae	Nominated	
Grand Bell Awards	2022	Best Film Editing	Kim Sang-beom	Nominated	
Grand Bell Awards	2022	Best Art Direction	Park Il-hyun	Nominated	
Grand Bell Awards	2022	Best Lighting	Lee Seong-hwan	Won	
Grand Bell Awards	2022	Best Costume Design	Jo Sang-kyung, Choi Yun-seon	Nominated	
Grand Bell Awards	2022	Best Music	Jo Yeong-wook	Nominated	
42nd Golden Cinematography Awards	2022	Editing Award	Hunt	Won	
Korean Association of Film Critics Awards	2022	Best New Director	Lee Jung-jae	Won	
Korean Association of Film Critics Awards	2022	Best Actor	Jung Woo-sung	Won	
Korean Association of Film Critics Awards	2022	Best Director	Lee Jung-jae	Nominated	
Korean Association of Film Critics Awards	2022	Best Supporting Actress	Jeon Hye-jin	Won	
Korean Association of Film Critics Awards	2022	Korean Association of Film 10 selections of Kim Hyun-seung	Hunt	Won	
Korean Association of Film Critics Awards	2022	Best Supporting Actor	Jo Woo-jin	Won	
Korean Film Producers Association Award	2022	Best director	Lee Jung-jae	Won	
Korean Film Producers Association Award	2022	Filmmaking, Arts, and Editing Awards	Lee Mo-gae, Park Il-hyun and Kim Sang-beum	Won	
Hawaii Film Critics Society Awards	2022	Best New Filmmaker	Lee Jung-Jae	Won	
London East Asia Film Festival	2022	Honorary Award	Lee Jung-Jae	Won	
Korea Image Awards	2023	Korea Image Stepping Stone Award	Lee Jung-Jae	Won	
Director's Cut Awards	2023	Best New Director	Lee Jung-Jae	Nominated	
