= Inside director =

Type of corporate director

An inside director is a member of the board of directors of a corporation who is also a member of the corporation's management, almost always a corporate officer.
