= Beat (1997 film) =

- Theatrical release poster
- Hangul: 비트
- RR: Biteu
- MR: Pit'ŭ
- Directed by: Kim Sung-su
- Screenplay by: Sam Shin
- Based on: Beat by Huh Young-man
- Produced by: Cha Sung-ji
- Starring: Jung Woo-sung; Ko So-young
- Cinematography: Kim Hyung-koo
- Edited by: Kim Hyeon
- Music by: Kim Jae-won
- Release date: May 3, 1997 (South Korea)
- Running time: 119 minutes
- Country: South Korea
- Language: Korean

Beat (Korean: 비트) is 1997 South Korean action crime film directed by Kim Sung-su and written by Sam Shin about a high school dropout who is forced into gang life. Jung Woo-sung played the lead Min and Ko So-young his love interest Romy. The plot is based on a bestselling graphic novel by Huh Young-man.

The role solidified Jung as a leading Korean actor and was also based on his real-life experience as a high school dropout.

== Plot ==
Three friends in South Korea drop out of high school. Min is a feared brawler whose mother is a widowed drunk. The story traces his journey from high school to the underworld as his best friend Tae-soo introduces him to life in the mob. Hwan-gyu is their other friend who seems unable to hold down a job. Further complicating Min's life is the volatile Romy, a girl from an upper-class family with dreams of going to a prestigious college.

== Cast ==
- Jung Woo-sung as Min
- Ko So-young as Romy
- Yoo Oh-sung as Tae-soo
- Im Chang-jung as Hwan-gyu
- Sa Hyeon-jin
- Song Geum-sig
- Jang Dong-jik
- Shin Burm-sik
- Kim Boo-seon as Madam Shin
- Lee In-ock
- Lee Moon-sik as Ward Office staff
