= Asura: The City of Madness =

- Theatrical release poster
- Hangul: 아수라
- Hanja: 阿修羅
- RR: Asura
- MR: Asura
- Directed by: Kim Sung-su
- Written by: Kim Sung-su
- Produced by: Han Jae-deok; Kang Hyun; Kim Jong-min
- Starring: Jung Woo-sung; Hwang Jung-min; Ju Ji-hoon; Kwak Do-won; Jung Man-sik
- Cinematography: Lee Mo-gae
- Edited by: Kim Sang-bum; Kim Jae-bum
- Music by: Lee Jae-jin
- Production company: Sanai Pictures
- Distributed by: CJ Entertainment
- Release dates: 12 September 2016 (Toronto); 28 September 2016 (South Korea)
- Running time: 132 minutes
- Country: South Korea
- Language: Korean
- Box office: US$18.3 million

Asura: The City of Madness (Korean: 아수라; RR: Asura) is a 2016 South Korean neo-noir action crime film directed by Kim Sung-su. The title, Asura, refers to demigods in Indian mythology who are consumed by passion and perpetually fighting each other. The film revolves around Han Do-kyung, a shady cop, who becomes caught between internal affairs and the city's corrupt mayor. Starring Jung Woo-sung, Hwang Jung-min, Ju Ji-hoon, Kwak Do-won and Jung Man-sik, it released theatrically on 28 September 2016 in South Korea.

== Synopsis ==
Homicide detective Han Do-kyung (Jung Woo-sung) receives money in exchange for taking care of behind-the-scenes work for corrupt Mayor Park Sung-bae (Hwang Jung-min). Han Do-kyung would do anything to make money in order to pay for the hospital bills of his wife, a terminal cancer patient. Seizing his weakness, prosecutors Kim Cha-in (Kwak Do-won) and Do Chang-hak (Jung Man-sik) threaten him and use him to investigate Park Sung-bae for corruption and crimes. Prosecutors and Park Sung-bae pressure Han Do-kyung for their own interests and purposes. Meanwhile, Moon Seon-mo, (Ju Ji-hoon) a junior detective who sees Han as an older brother, follows in his footsteps and leaves the police force to work for the corrupt Mayor Park Sung-bae. As events unfold, Han Do-kyung's life becomes like the eye of a typhoon.

== Cast ==
- Jung Woo-sung as Han Do-kyung
- Hwang Jung-min as Park Sung-bae
- Ju Ji-hoon as Moon Seon-mo
- Kwak Do-won as Kim Cha-in
- Jung Man-sik as Do Chang-hak
- Kim Won-hae as Junkie
- Kim Jong-soo as Eun Chung-ho
- Kim Hae-gon as Tae Byung-jo
- Yoon Ji-hye as Cha Seung-mi
- Oh Yeon-ah as Jung Yoon-hee
- Kim Soo-jin as Female councilor
- Anupam Tripathi as Indian worker

=== Special appearance ===
- Yoon Je-moon as Chief Hwang
- Park Jeong-hak as Inspector Park

== Awards and nominations ==
Year	Award	Category	Recipient	Result
2016	37th Blue Dragon Film Awards	Best Actor	Jung Woo-sung	Nominated
2016	37th Blue Dragon Film Awards	Popularity Award	Jung Woo-sung	Won
2016	37th Blue Dragon Film Awards	Best Cinematography	Lee Mo-gae	Won
2016	37th Blue Dragon Film Awards	Best Art Direction	Jang Geun-young	Nominated
2016	37th Blue Dragon Film Awards	Best Lighting	Lee Sung-hwan	Won
2016	37th Blue Dragon Film Awards	Best Music	Lee Jae-jin	Nominated
2016	37th Blue Dragon Film Awards	Technical Award	Heo Myung-haeng; Choi Bong-rok	Nominated
2016	17th Busan Film Critics Awards	Best Actor	Jung Woo-sung	Won
2016	17th Busan Film Critics Awards	Best Cinematography	Lee Mo-gae	Won
2016	36th Korean Association of Film Critics Awards	Ten Best Films of the Year	Asura: The City of Madness	Won
2016	53rd Grand Bell Awards	Best Cinematography	Lee Mo-gae	Nominated
2016	53rd Grand Bell Awards	Best Art Direction	Jang Geun-young	Nominated
2016	53rd Grand Bell Awards	Best Editing	Kim Jae-bum	Nominated
2016	53rd Grand Bell Awards	Best Lighting	Lee Sung-hwan	Nominated
2017	53rd Baeksang Arts Awards	Best Film	Asura: The City of Madness	Nominated
2017	53rd Baeksang Arts Awards	Best Director	Kim Sung-su	Nominated
2017	53rd Baeksang Arts Awards	Best Screenplay	Kim Sung-su	Nominated
2017	26th Buil Film Awards	Best Film	Asura: The City of Madness	Nominated
2017	26th Buil Film Awards	Best Director	Kim Sung-su	Won
2017	26th Buil Film Awards	Best Actor	Jung Woo-sung	Nominated
2017	26th Buil Film Awards	Best Supporting Actor	Ju Ji-hoon	Nominated
2017	26th Buil Film Awards	Best Cinematography	Lee Mo-gae	Nominated
2017	26th Buil Film Awards	Best Art Direction	Jang Geun-young	Nominated
2017	26th Buil Film Awards	Best Music	Lee Jae-jin	Nominated
2017	22nd Chunsa Film Art Awards	Best Supporting Actor	Ju Ji-hoon	Nominated
2017	The Korea Film Actor's Association	Popular Film Star Award	Ju Ji-hoon	Won
