= Kim Sung-su (director) =

South Korean film director (born 1961)

Kim Sung-soo
- Born: November 15, 1961 (age 64); South Korea
- Education: Sejong University – English Language and Literature (BA); Dongguk University – Theater and Film Master (MA)
- Occupations: Film director; screenwriter
- Years active: 1990–present

Korean name
- Hangul: 김성수
- Hanja: 金成洙
- RR: Gim Seongsu
- MR: Kim Sŏngsu

Kim Sung-su (Korean: 김성수; born November 15, 1961) is a South Korean film director, known mainly for Beat (1997), City of the Rising Sun (1999), Musa (2001), Please Teach Me English (2003), Flu (2013), Asura: The City of Madness (2016), and 12.12: The Day (2023).

== Filmography ==
=== Feature films ===
Year	Title	Credited as			Ref.
Year	Title	Director	Writer	Producer	Ref.
1990	Black Republic	No	Yes	No	
1991	Berlin Report	Assistant director	No	No	
1995	Runaway	Yes	Yes	No	
1997	Beat	Yes	No	No	
1999	City of the Rising Sun	Yes	Yes	No	
2001	Musa	Yes	Yes	No	
2003	Please Teach Me English	Yes	Yes	Yes	
2006	The Restless	No	No	Yes	
2010	My Ex-Wife's Wedding	No	No	Yes	
2013	Flu	Yes	Yes	No	
2016	Asura: The City of Madness	Yes	Yes	No	
2023	12.12: The Day	Yes	Yes	No	

=== Short films ===
Year	Title	Credited as	
Year	Title	Director	Writer
1993	Dead End	Yes	Yes
2004	Back	Yes	Yes

== Awards and nominations ==
Year	Award	Category	Recipient	Result	Ref.
2016	36th Korean Association of Film Critics Awards	Ten Best Films of the Year	Asura: The City of Madness	Won	
2017	53rd Baeksang Arts Awards	Best Film	Asura: The City of Madness	Nominated	
2017	53rd Baeksang Arts Awards	Best Director	Asura: The City of Madness	Nominated	
2017	53rd Baeksang Arts Awards	Best Screenplay	Asura: The City of Madness	Nominated	
2017	26th Buil Film Awards	Best Film	Asura: The City of Madness	Nominated	
2017	26th Buil Film Awards	Best Director	Asura: The City of Madness	Won	
2024	60th Baeksang Arts Awards	Grand Prize – Film	Kim Sung-su	Won	
2024	60th Baeksang Arts Awards	Best Film	12.12: The Day	Won	
2024	60th Baeksang Arts Awards	Best Director – Film	12.12: The Day	Nominated	
