= Dora (2026 film) =

2026 drama film by July Jung

- International promotional poster
- Hangul: 도라
- RR: Dora
- MR: Tora
- Directed by: July Jung
- Screenplay by: July Jung
- Based on: Fragments of an Analysis of a Case of Hysteria by Sigmund Freud
- Starring: Kim Do-yeon; Sakura Ando; Song Sae-byeok; Choi Won-young
- Cinematography: Irina Lubtchansky
- Edited by: Han Miyeon
- Music by: Jang Younggyu; Choi Taehyun
- Production companies: The French Connection; RedPeter Films; Les Films Fauves
- Distributed by: Les Films du Losange (France); Episode Company (South Korea)
- Release date: 17 May 2026 (Cannes)
- Running time: 137 minutes
- Countries: South Korea; France; Luxembourg
- Language: Korean

Dora (Korean: 도라) is a 2026 drama film written and directed by July Jung. It is a contemporary adaptation of Sigmund Freud's case study of Dora, a pseudonymous patient whom he treated for hysteria in 1900. It stars Kim Do-yeon, Sakura Ando, Song Sae-byeok and Choi Won-young.

The film had its world premiere at the Directors' Fortnight section of the 79th Cannes Film Festival on 17 May 2026.

== Premise ==
A family living in Seoul takes a vacation to the seaside one summer, where their daughter Dora, suffering from an illness, falls in love for the first time.

== Cast ==
- Kim Do-yeon as Dora
- Sakura Ando as Nami
- Song Sae-byeok as Yeon-su
- Choi Won-young as Sang-hun

== Production ==
The Korean Film Council selected Dora for its "KO-PICK" initiative, designed to promote Korean film in global markets. The film was partly funded by a 600 million won (US$402,000) grant from the South Korean government.

== Release ==
Dora had its world premiere at the 79th Cannes Film Festival, in the Directors' Fortnight section, on 17 May 2026. It is Jung's third film to play at Cannes, following A Girl at My Door (2014) and Next Sohee (2022).

The film is scheduled to be released in theaters in South Korea in the second half of 2026.
