= Ahn Tae-jin =

South Korean filmmaker (born 1972)

- Born: 1972 (age 53–54); South Korea
- Occupations: Film director; Screenwriter
- Spouse: undisclosed (m. 2005)

Korean name
- Hangul: 안태진
- RR: An Taejin
- MR: An T'aejin

Ahn Tae-jin (Korean: 안태진; born 1972) is a South Korean filmmaker. He is known for his directional debut The Night Owl (2022), for which he has received numerous best new director awards.

== Early life ==
After watching Back to the Future on its opening day at the Daehan Theater, 16-year-old Ahn was inspired to pursue a career as a film director.

== Career ==
The Night Owl marks director Ahn Tae-jin's official debut as a director 17 years after being an assistant director for Lee Jun-ik's The King and the Clown in 2005. This is the first work presented to the audience under the title.

It took him 17 years to direct his first film. After filming for The King and the Clown ended, Ahn began writing the screenplay and completed a noir screenplay with the working title "Diver" within a year. He sent this to the film company, but there was no response. Even after that, the work fell through several times. There were 10 scenarios or treatments (more detailed outlines than synopses) written before The Night Owl. All failed in investment and casting. The action noir scenario, which took nearly three years to complete, was brought to the production stage by recruiting famous actors around 2011, but failed to receive investment. At this time, he was most frustrated. Fortunately, the frustration was short and short-lived.

He worked as a courier to earn living expenses. The district he was in charge of at the time was Chungmuro. When he went to a film studio to deliver something, he would leave the item behind and sneak out. He even earned about 1 million won a month through early morning milk delivery. What he realized at that time was that his favorite thing to do was movies. The anxiety that he would never be able to work in movies again if his debut film went wrong became the driving force that made him pour all his effort into it.

In 2018, Ahn was first offered to write the story by Baek Yeon-ja, CEO of Damdam, a film company. At first, there was only a very simple narrative: the main character with blindness enters the palace and witnesses a secret. The idea was so interesting that he accepted the offer and added to the story using the thriller genre, which he always liked.

At the end of 2022, when the slump in Korean films was severe, the number of viewers reached 3.32 million, ranking 8th in the annual box office in 2022. Among the works released at the same time, The Night Owl is the only Korean film to exceed 1 million viewers.

In particular, the moment when his debut feature film, The Night Owl, was released was 17 years after rewriting numerous scripts, and after working as an assistant director for the 2005 film The King and the Clown. It was named as the winner of the Best Picture award at the Baeksang Arts Awards and became a moment that gave hope to aspiring filmmakers.

== Personal life ==
Ahn married his wife in 2005 when The King and the Clown was released. His wife worked for the company and served as the head of the household for 17 years.

== Filmography ==
=== Film ===
Year	Title		Credited as		Notes	Ref.
Year	English	Korean	Director	Writer	Notes	Ref.
2004	Hi! Dharma 2: Showdown in Seoul	달마야, 서울가자	No	No	Production staff member	
2005	The King and the Clown	왕의 남자	Assistant	No		
2022	The Night Owl	올빼미	Yes	Yes		
TBA	Dochabi	도차비	Yes	No		

=== Television ===
Year	Title		Credited as		Notes	Ref.
Year	English	Korean	Director	Writer	Notes	Ref.
2006	Series Dasepo Naughty Girl	시리즈 다세포 소녀	Yes	No		

== Accolades ==
Award ceremony	Year	Category	Nominated work	Result	Ref.
Baeksang Arts Awards	2023	Best Film	The Night Owl	Won	
Baeksang Arts Awards	2023	Best Director	The Night Owl	Nominated	
Baeksang Arts Awards	2023	Best New Director	The Night Owl	Won	
Baeksang Arts Awards	2023	Best Screenplay	The Night Owl	Nominated	
Director's Cut Awards	2023	Best New Director in film	The Night Owl	Won	
Director's Cut Awards	2023	Best Director in film	The Night Owl	Nominated	
Director's Cut Awards	2023	Best Screenplay	The Night Owl	Nominated	
Korean Association of Film Critics Awards	2023	Best New Director	The Night Owl	Won	
Buil Film Awards	2023	Best New Director	The Night Owl	Nominated	
Buil Film Awards	2023	Best Screenplay	The Night Owl	Nominated	
Buil Film Awards	2023	Best Film	The Night Owl	Nominated	
Golden Cinema Film Festival	2023	Best Director	The Night Owl	Won	
Grand Bell Awards	2023	Best Film	The Night Owl	Nominated	
Grand Bell Awards	2023	Best New Director	The Night Owl	Won	
Grand Bell Awards	2023	Best Screenplay	The Night Owl	Won	
Blue Dragon Film Awards	2023	Best Film	The Night Owl	Nominated	
Blue Dragon Film Awards	2023	Best New Director	The Night Owl	Won	
Blue Dragon Film Awards	2023	Best Screenplay	The Night Owl	Nominated	
