= Chunsa Film Art Awards 2023 =

28th edition of award ceremony

28th Chunsa International Film Festival
- Official poster
- Awarded for: Excellence in cinematic achievements
- Awarded by: Korean Film Directors Association
- Announced on: December 5, 2023
- Presented on: December 7, 2023
- Site: Construction Center in Gangnam-gu, Seoul, South Korea
- Hosted by: Song Ji-woo; Lee Kyu-han; Lee Byung-jin
- Official website: Chunsa Film Art Awards

Highlights
- Un Certain Regard Director Award: Jung Ju-ri
- Best Direction: Kim Jee-woon; Cobweb
- Best Actor: Ryu Jun-yeol; The Night Owl
- Best Actress: Kim Hye-soo; Smugglers
- Best Supporting Actor: Kim Jong-soo; Smugglers
- Best Supporting Actress: Krystal Jung; Cobweb

Television coverage
- Network: Naver TV

The Chunsa Film Art Awards (Korean: 춘사국제영화제; Hanja: 春史國際映畫祭; also known as The 28th Chunsa International Film Festival) have been hosted by the Korean Film Directors Association, since the 1990s to commemorate the Korean film pioneer Chunsa Na Woon-gyu. Previously known as Chunsa Film Festival, it became an international film festival in 2021.

The 28th Chunsa International Film Festival was held on December 7 at Construction Center in Gangnam-gu, Seoul. The ceremony was hosted by Lee Kyu-han, Song Ji-woo and comedian Lee Byung-jin.

In the ceremony streamed live on Naver TV, Kim Jee-woon won the best director award for period black comedy-drama film Cobweb, whereas Ryu Jun-yeol won best actor award for The Night Owl and Kim Hye-soo best actress award for Smugglers.

== Award categories ==
In this year's ceremony, awards in following 14 categories will be given.

- Best Director Award
- Best Actor Award
- Best Actress Award
- Special Jury Award (Director Category)
- Special Jury Award (Actor Category)
- Best Supporting Actress Award
- Best Supporting Actor Award
- Best New Actress Award
- Best New Actor Award
- Best New Director Award
- Best Screenplay,
- Un Certain Regard,
- Director, Achievement Award
- Special Award

== Winners and nominees ==
Kim Jee-woon, Best Director award winner

The nominees for the 28th Chunsa Film Art Awards were announced on December 5, 2023.

The winners were announced on December 7, at the ceremony that was held at the Vista Hall of the Construction Center in Gangnam-gu, Seoul.

Best Director	Best New Director
Kim Jee-woon – Cobweb; Um Tae-hwa – Concrete Utopia; Ahn Tae-jin – The Night Owl	Ahn Tae-jin – The Night Owl
Best Actor	Best Actress
Ryu Jun-yeol – The Night Owl; Lee Byung-hun – Concrete Utopia; Song Kang-ho – Cobweb	Kim Hye-soo – Smugglers; Kim Hee-sun – Honey Sweet; Kim Yun-jin – Confession
Best Supporting Actor	Best Supporting Actress
Kim Jong-soo – Smugglers; Kim Mu-yeol – The Devil's Deal; Choi Kwang-il – Confession	Krystal Jung – Cobweb; Jeon Yeo-been – Cobweb; Nana – Confession
Best New Actor	Best New Actress
Kim Sung-cheol – The Night Owl; Seo In-guk – Project Wolf Hunting; Yoon Shi-yoon – Birth	Go Min-si – Smugglers; Kim Si-eun – Next Sohee
Special Jury Award
Director	Actor
Lee Han – Honey Sweet	Yoo Hae-jin – Honey Sweet
Achievement Award	Special Award
Kang Beom-gu – North Star; Kim Jeong-yong – Government Affairs Shinkwon	Shin Sang-ok – Winter Story
Un Certain Regard Director Award	Best Screenplay
Jung Ju-ri – Next Sohee; Lim Oh-jeong – Long Live Hell	Hyun Gyu-ri, Ahn Tae-jin – The Night Owl

== See also ==
- 59th Baeksang Arts Awards
- 32nd Buil Film Awards
- 44th Blue Dragon Film Awards
