= 44th Blue Dragon Film Awards =

2023 edition of award ceremony

- Official poster
- Awarded for: Excellence in cinematic achievements
- Awarded by: Sports Chosun
- Announced on: November 6, 2023
- Presented on: November 24, 2023
- Site: KBS Hall, Yeouido, Seoul
- Hosted by: Kim Hye-soo; Yoo Yeon-seok
- Organized by: Sports Chosun (a sister brand of The Chosun Ilbo)
- Official website: www.blueaward.co.kr

Highlights
- Best Film: Smugglers
- Popular Star Award: Song Joong-ki; Zo In-sung; Kim Seon-ho; Park Bo-young
- Best Director: Um Tae-hwa; Concrete Utopia
- Best Actor: Lee Byung-hun; Concrete Utopia
- Best Actress: Jung Yu-mi; Sleep
- Most awards: Smugglers (4)
- Most nominations: Smugglers (12)

Television coverage
- Network: KBS; YouTube; Naver Now
- Viewership: 999,000 People; Ratings: 5.9%

The 44th Blue Dragon Film Awards (Korean: 제44회 청룡영화상) is an annual South Korean award ceremony organized by Sports Chosun (a sister brand of The Chosun Ilbo). Hosted by Kim Hye-soo for the 30th and the last time and Yoo Yeon-seok, it was held on November 24, 2023, at KBS Hall in Yeouido, Seoul. It was broadcast live on KBS2 and KBS YouTube channels. Nominations for 15 categories were announced on November 6, Smugglers received 12 nominations.

Smugglers, a crime film by Ryoo Seung-wan won four awards including Best Film, Best Supporting Actor, Best New Actress, and Best Music awards.

== Selection of awards ==
The winners of the awards are selected through netizen voting on the Celeb Champ app starting from November 7. Voting lines for Best Picture, Best Director, Best New Director, Best Male/Female Actor, Best Supporting Actor, Best New Male/Female Actress, and Popular Star Award closed on 12 noon on November 24, whereas for the Best Cinematography, Best Screenplay, and Best Music, Art Award, Editing Award, and Technology Award, the lines closed on November 15.

== Nominees and winners ==
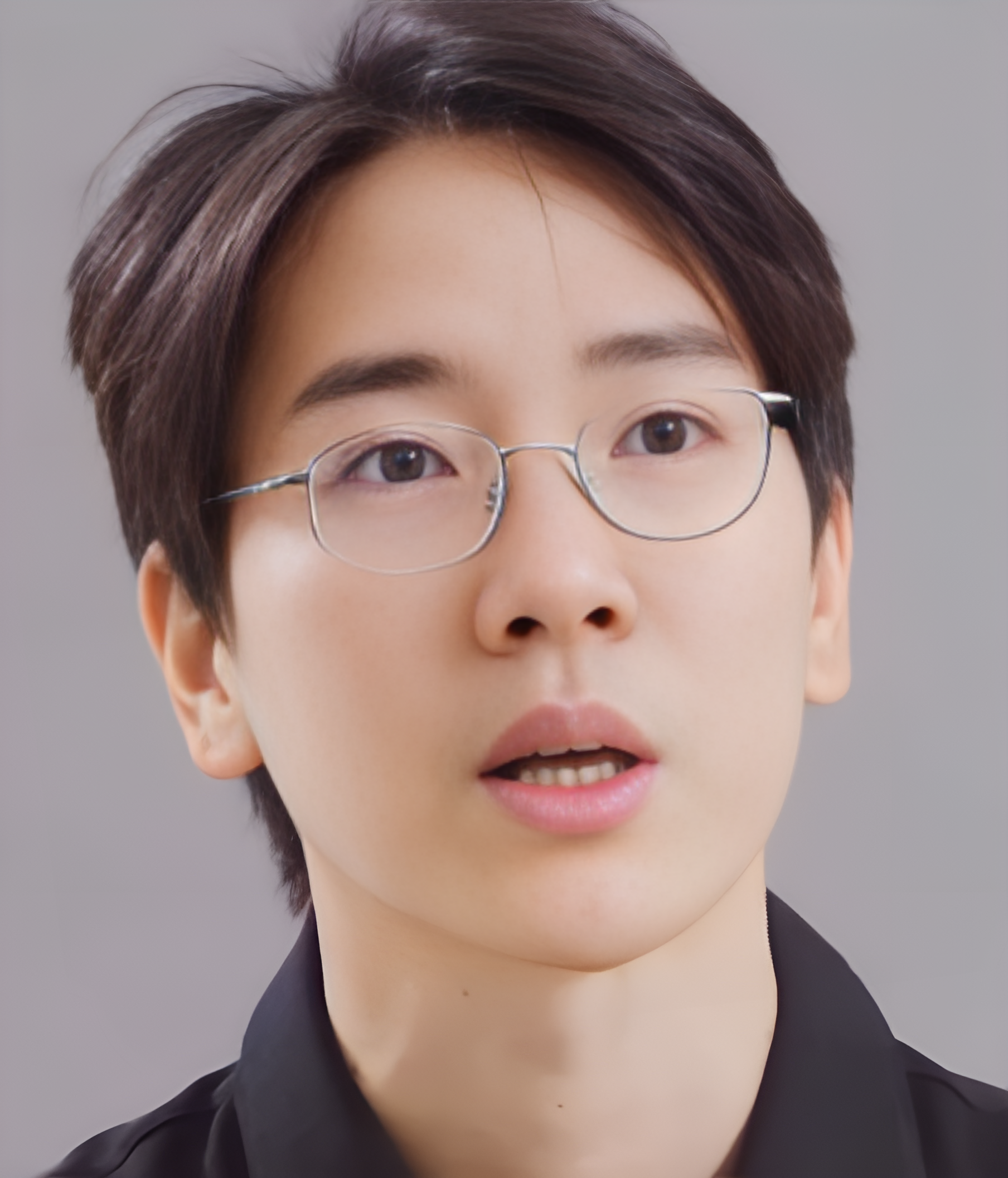
Um Tae-hwa, the winner of Best Director award

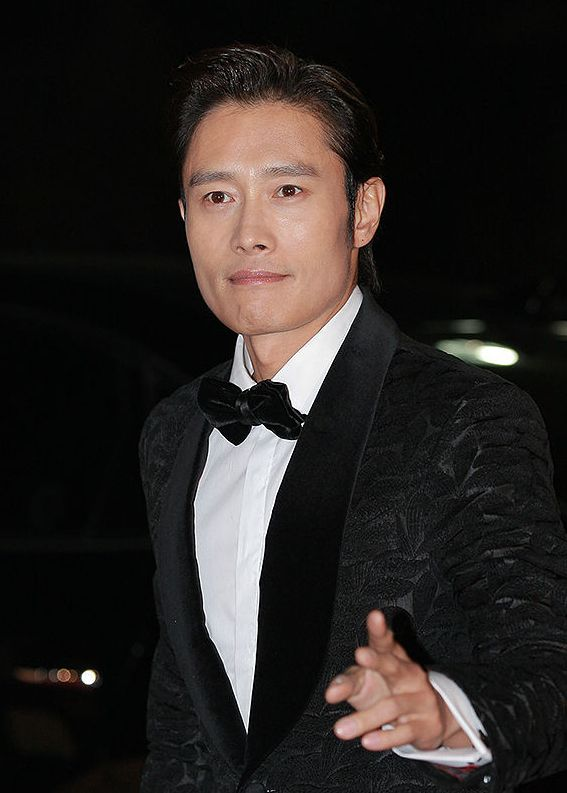
Lee Byung-hun, the winner of Best Actor award

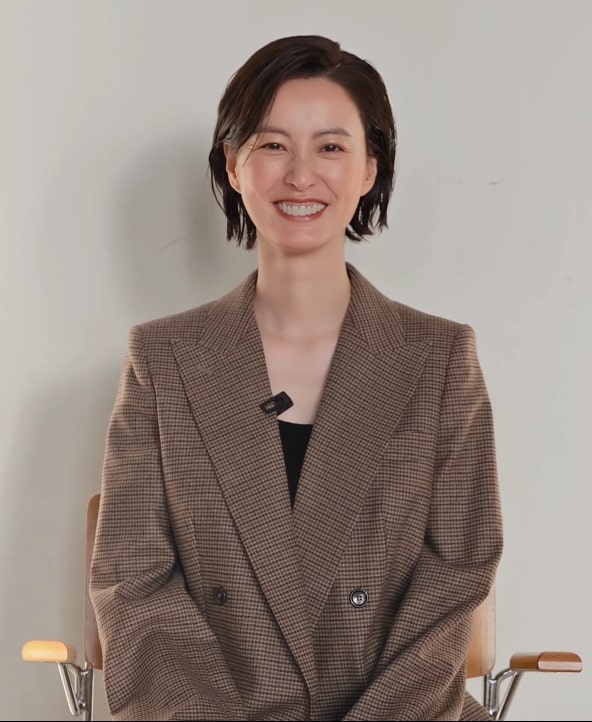
Jung Yu-mi, the winner of Best Actress award

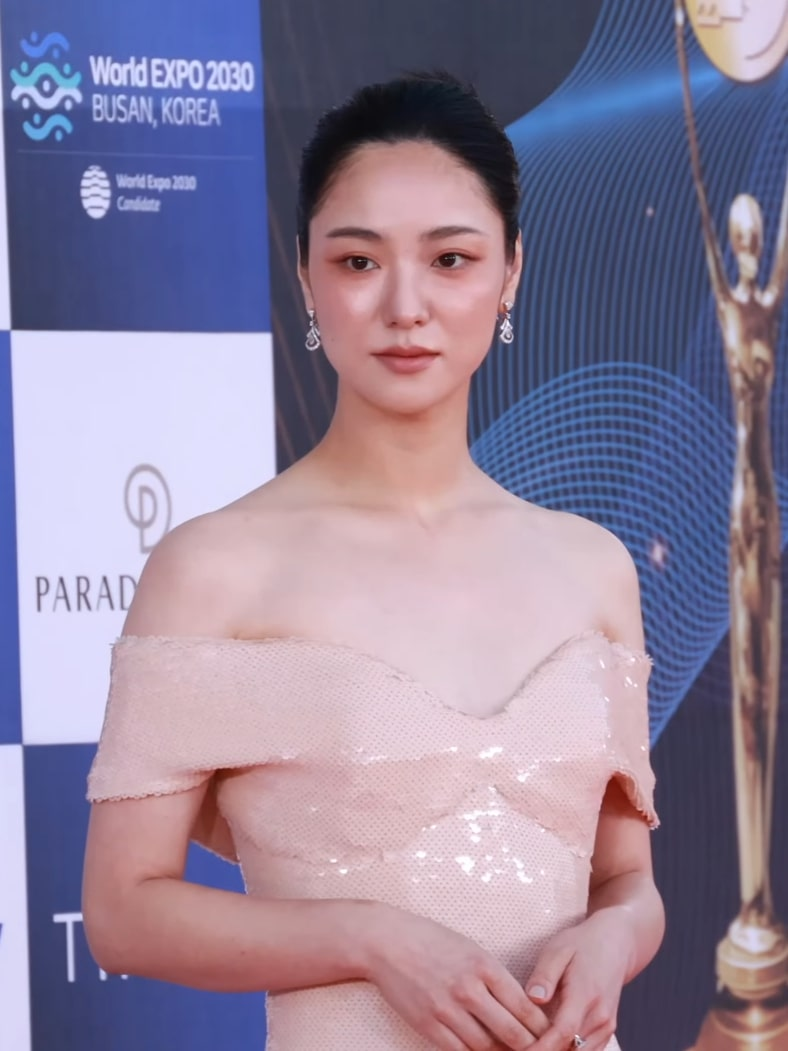
Jeon Yeo-been, the winner of Best Supporting Actress award

The nominees for the awards were announced in 15 categories on November 6, 2023.

Winners are listed first, highlighted in boldface, and indicated with a double dagger (‡).

**Best Film**	**Best Director**
**Smugglers** ‡; Concrete Utopia; Next Sohee; The Night Owl; Cobweb	**Um Tae-hwa – Concrete Utopia** ‡; Kim Jee-woon – Cobweb; Ryu Seung-wan – Smugglers; Lee Han – Honey Sweet; Jung Ju-ri – Next Sohee
**Best Actor**	**Best Actress**
**Lee Byung-hun – Concrete Utopia** ‡; Doh Kyung-soo – The Moon; Ryu Jun-yeol – The Night Owl; Yoo Hae-jin – Honey Sweet; Song Kang-ho – Cobweb	**Jung Yu-mi – Sleep** ‡; Kim Seo-hyung – Green House; Kim Hye-soo — Smugglers; Park Bo-young – Concrete Utopia; Yum Jung-ah — Smugglers
**Best Supporting Actor**	**Best Supporting Actress**
**Zo In-sung – Smugglers** ‡; Park Jeong-min – Smugglers; Song Joong-ki – Hopeless; Lee Joon-hyuk – The Roundup: No Way Out; Oh Jung-se – Cobweb	**Jeon Yeo-been – Cobweb** ‡; Krystal Jung – Cobweb; Kim Sun-young – Concrete Utopia; Han Sun-hwa — Honey Sweet; Lee Yoon-ji – Dream Palace
**Best New Actor**	**Best New Actress**
**Hong Xa-bin – Hopeless** ‡; Lee Shin-young – Rebound; Kim Seon-ho – The Childe; Kang Tae-joo – The Childe; Choi Min-young – Dream Palace	**Go Min-si – Smugglers** ‡; Kim Si-eun – Next Sohee; Kim Hyeong-seo – Hopeless; Ahn Eun-jin – The Night Owl; An So-yo – Green House
**Best New Director**	**Best Screenplay**
**Ahn Tae-jin – The Night Owl** ‡; Ka Sung-moon – Dream Palace; Kim Chang-hoon – Hopeless; Jason Yu – Sleep; Lee Sol-hui – Green House	**Jung Ju-ri – Next Sohee** ‡; Lee Shin-ji, Um Tae-hwa – Concrete Utopia; Hyun Eun-mi, Ahn Tae-jin – The Night Owl; Ryoo Seung-wan, Kim Jeong-yeon, Choi Cha-won – Smugglers; Shin Yeon-shick – Cobweb
**Best Editing**	**Best Cinematography and Lighting**
**Kim Sun-min – The Night Owl** ‡; Han Mi-yeon – Sleep; Han Mi-yeon – Concrete Utopia; Yang Jin-mo – Cobweb; Lee Gang-hee – Smugglers	**Kim Tae-kyeong, Hong Seung-chul — The Night Owl** ‡; Kim Jee-yong, Park Jun-woo – Cobweb; Kim Young-ho, Hwang Soon-wook – The Moon; Choi Yeong-hwan, Lee Jae-hyuk– Smugglers; Cho Hyoung-rae, Lee Kil-kyu– Concrete Utopia
**Best Art Direction**	**Best Music**
**Jung Yi-jin – Cobweb** ‡; Lee Hoo-kyoung – Smugglers; Kim Min-hye – Ballerina; Cho Hwa-sung, Choi Hyun-seouk – Concrete Utopia; Lee Ha-jun – The Night Owl	**Chang Kiha – Smugglers** ‡; Mowg – Cobweb; Kim Hae-won – Concrete Utopia; Gray — Ballerina; Hwang Sang-jun – Hero
**Technical Award**	**Chung Jung-won Best Short Film**
**Jin Jong-hyun (VFX) – The Moon** ‡; Eun Jae-hyun (VFX) – Concrete Utopia; Yoon Jung-hee (Costume Design) – Smugglers; Heo Myeong-hoeng, Yoon Sung-min (Stunt) — The Roundup: No Way Out; Park Yong-ki (Sound) – The Night Owl	**Ghwa the Last Name**; A Room of Two Women's Own; World of Hello; Yangnimdong girl; Good Boy Candy
**Chung Jung-won Popular Star Award**	**Audience Choice Award for Most Popular Film**
**Song Joong-ki ‡**; **Zo In-sung ‡**; **Kim Seon-ho ‡**; **Park Bo-young ‡**	**The Roundup: No Way Out ‡**; Smugglers (2nd); Concrete Utopia (3rd); The Night Owl (4th); Hero (5th)
**Special Achievement Award**
**Kim Hye-soo** ‡

=== Films with multiple nominations and awards ===
Films with multiple nominations
Nominations	Films
12	Smugglers
11	Cobweb
11	Concrete Utopia
9	The Night Owl
4	Next Sohee
4	Hopeless
3	Honey Sweet
3	The Moon
3	Dream Palace
3	Green House
3	Sleep
2	Ballerina
2	The Roundup: No Way Out
2	The Childe

Films with multiple awards
Wins	Films
4	Smugglers
3	The Night Owl
2	Cobweb
2	Concrete Utopia

== Performances ==
Order	Artist	Act performed
1	NewJeans	"ETA" + "Super Shy"
2	Kim Wan-sun	"Dance in the Rhythm"
3	Park Jin-young	"Sweet Dreams" + "When We Disco" + "Take On Me" + "Changed Man"

== See also ==
- 59th Baeksang Arts Awards
- 59th Grand Bell Awards
- 32nd Buil Film Awards
- Chunsa Film Art Awards 2023
