= Kim Si-eun (actress, born 1999) =

South Korean actress (born 1999)

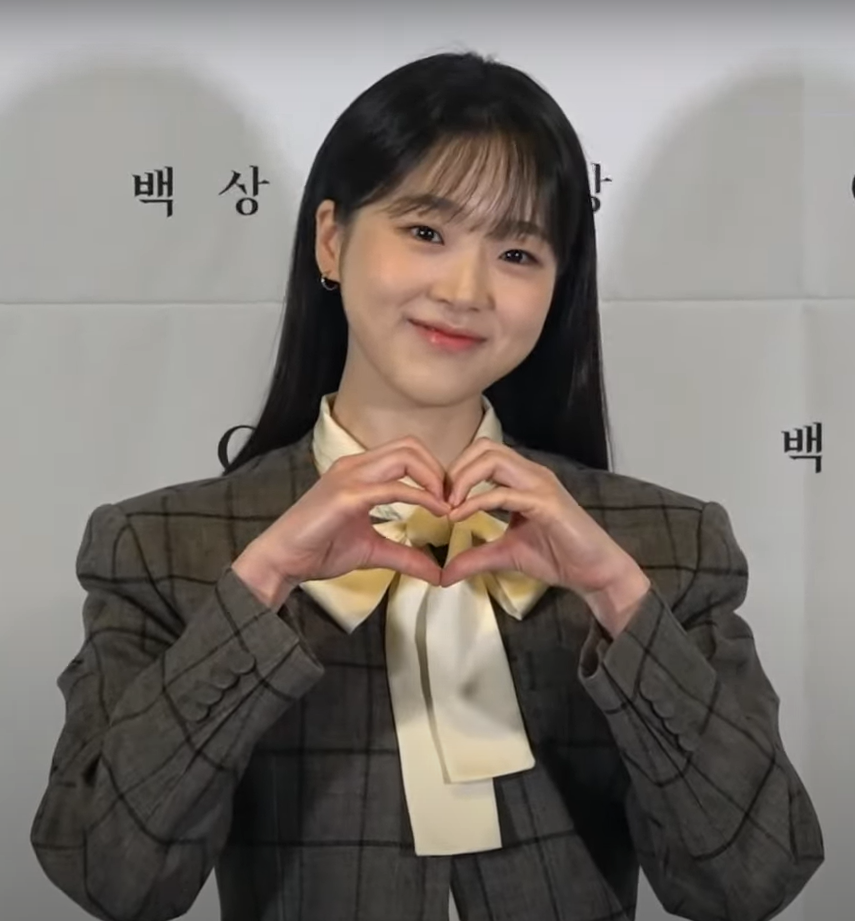
- Kim in 2023
- Born: January 19, 1999 (age 27); Goyang, South Korea
- Occupation: Actress
- Years active: 2016–present
- Agent: Goldmedalist

Korean name
- Hangul: 김시은
- RR: Gim Sieun
- MR: Kim Siŭn
- Website: goldmedalist.com

Kim Si-eun (Korean: 김시은; born January 19, 1999) is a South Korean actress, known for her titular role in the film Next Sohee (2022) and the second season of Squid Game (2024).

== Career ==
Kim was born on January 19, 1999 in Ilsandong District, Goyang, Gyeonggi Province, South Korea.

She made her debut in 2016 with the show Live Talk! Talk! Boni Hani.

Next Sohee is a film directed by Jung Ju-ri that portrays the story of a high school student undergoing on-site training at a call center and a female detective who questions the incidents. In an interview, Jung Ju-ri shared the story of how she came to cast newcomer Kim Si-eun in the lead role. It all started when Jung stumbled upon a YouTube video featuring Kim energetically hosting Educational Broadcasting System's Live Talk! Talk! Boni Hani. Intrigued by her vibrant presence, Jung arranged a meeting with Kim. During their conversation in the audition, Jung was struck by Kim's determination and her ability to approach the story with objectivity. This impressed Jung, who found Kim to be an extraordinary talent. As they proceed, it was unfolded naturally and effortlessly and Kim's performance resonating with the character of So-hee.

Leaving a strong impression with Sohee's innocent and confident appearance in the movie, she won Best New Actress in Film at the 59th Baeksang Arts Awards.

In September 2023, Kim signed with new agency Goldmedalist.

In December 2024, Kim starred in the most watched Netflix original series, the second season of Squid Game, in the series, she played the role of Young-mi, the participant with the number 095. Kim received widespread recognition for her performance. The series ranked No. 1 in Netflix's Global Top 10 Series.

== Filmography ==
=== Film ===
Year	Title	Role	Ref.
2018	The Negotiation	Lee Jong-seok	
2020	Boys Be!	Eun-ji	
2022	Next Sohee	So-hee	
2022	You and I	Ha-eun	

=== Television series ===
Year	Title	Role	Notes	Ref.
2018	When Time Stops	Hwa-sook		
2019	Special Labor Inspector	Assistant Manager Oh		
2020	Chip In	Seon Deok-go		
2020	Run On	Go Ye-chan		
2022	Mental Coach Jegal	Jo Ji-yeong		
2024	Squid Game	Kim Young-mi (Player 095)	Season 2	
2026	Dead-End Job	Woman on Han River bridge	Cameo (episode 8)	
TBA	Knock-Off	TBA		

=== Web series ===
Year	Title	Role	Notes	Ref.
2022	Brain, Your Choice of Romance	L		

=== Television shows ===
Year	Title	Role	Ref.
2016–2017	Live Talk! Talk! Bonnie (생방송 톡!톡! 보니하니)	Ha-ni	
2018–2019	Live Panda (생방송 판다다)		

== Musical ==
Year	Title	Role	Notes	Ref.
2013	Mulan (뮬란)	Hwa Mulan	Child's part	

== Accolades ==
=== Awards and nominations ===
Name of the award ceremony, year presented, category, nominee of the award, and the result of the nomination
Award ceremony	Year	Category	Nominee / Work	Result	Ref.
Baeksang Arts Awards	2023	Best New Actress – Film	Next Sohee	Won	
Blue Dragon Film Awards	2023	Best New Actress	Next Sohee	Nominated	
Buil Film Awards	2023	Best New Actress	Next Sohee	Won	
Busan Film Critics Awards	2023	Best New Actress	Next Sohee	Won	
Cine21 Film Awards	2023	Film New Actress of the Year	Next Sohee	Won	
Chunsa Film Art Awards	2023	Best New Actress	Next Sohee	Nominated	
Director's Cut Awards	2024	Best Actress in Film	Next Sohee	Nominated	
Director's Cut Awards	2024	Best New Actress in Film	Next Sohee	Won	
Golden Cinematography Awards	2023	Best New Actress	Next Sohee	Won	
Grand Bell Awards	2023	Best New Actress	Next Sohee	Won	
Korean Association of Film Critics Awards	2023	Best New Actress	Next Sohee	Won	
Korean Film Producers Association Awards	2023	Best New Actress	Next Sohee	Won	
Wildflower Film Awards	2023	Best Newcomer	Next Sohee	Nominated	
World Star Entertainment Awards	2019	Hallyu Rookie Awards, Song Drama Division	Kim Si-eun	Won	

=== Listicles ===
Name of publisher, year listed, name of listicle, and placement
Publisher	Year	Listicle	Placement	Ref.
Cine21	2024	"Korean Film NEXT 50" – Actors	Placed	
Forbes	2024	30 Under 30 Asia	Placed	
Joy News 24	2023	Rising Star Film Actor of the Year	2nd	
