= July Jung =

South Korean filmmaker (born 1980)

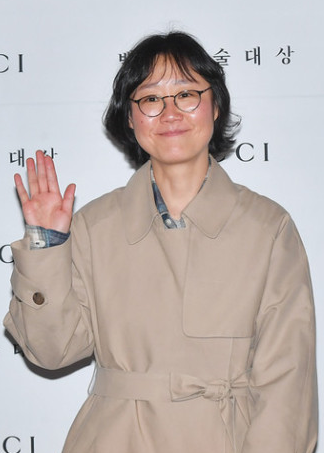
- Jung in April 2023
- Born: Jung Joo-ri; 1980 (age 45–46); Yeosu, South Korea
- Education: Sungkyunkwan University (Bachelor Degree); Korea National University of Arts(Master Degree)
- Occupations: Film director, screenwriter
- Years active: 2006 to present
- Honours: Officier de l'Ordre des Arts et des Lettres (2026)

Korean name
- Hangul: 정주리
- RR: Jeong Juri
- MR: Chŏng Churi

Jung Joo-ri (Korean: 정주리; born 1980), also known as July Jung, is a South Korean film director and screenwriter. Jung's directorial debut feature A Girl at My Door won the Best First Film at the 25th Stockholm International Film Festival. She also won the Best New Director at the 23rd Buil Film Awards and Best Director/Screenwriter at the 15th Women in Film Korea Awards in 2014, and Best Screenplay at the 2nd Wildflower Film Awards and Best New Director for film at the 51st Baeksang Arts Awards in 2015.

== Early years and education ==
Jung grew up in Yeosu, until she graduated from high school. During her freshman year of high school, she noted in her diary an intention to become a film director. Her early exposure to cinema was influenced by her father, who regularly watched rented videotapes of Hong Kong, Hollywood, and European films at night. Observing her father watching these films contributed to her own viewing habits.

When applying to higher education institutions, Jung initially held a general interest in video media rather than a fixed objective of directing. Believing that enrollment in a film program would not automatically lead to a directing career, she ultimately chose to pursue a degree in the Department of Film and Television at Sungkyunkwan University.

Jung experienced a delayed graduation relative to her peers following an academic expulsion and subsequent readmission. It was during her college years that her passion for movies started to take shape. Her dedication to cinema developed during her undergraduate years as she encountered a diverse curriculum that emphasized the importance of film grammar. During this period, she observed that the Department of Film and Television prioritized animation and interactive media over live-action filmmaking. To address this, Jung formed a peer group to produce independent short films using camcorders, gaining practical production experience. Excessive focus on filmmaking led to class absenteeism and her subsequent expulsion, though she later successfully petitioned for readmission. Upon returning, she added a second major in Western philosophy to her studies. This integration of film theory and philosophy advanced her technical and artistic proficiency. Eventually, Jung successfully completed her studies and graduated from Department of Film at Sungkyunkwan University in 2005. Following graduation, she briefly prepared for journalism examinations before determining that the field did not suit her aptitude.

Determined to pursue filmmaking professionally, Jung enrolled at the Korea National University of Arts around the age twenty-five. During her graduate studies, she produced several short films, including her 2007 debut, "A Man Under the Influenza". The English title references John Cassavetes' film A Woman Under the Influence, which is known for Gena Rowlands' exceptional performance. Set in a Chinese restaurant, the narrative adopts the style of an absurdist play and won the Sonje Award at the Busan International Film Festival. While still enrolled, Jung directed the 2008 short film "11", which follows a young female police station chief. Upon graduation, she anticipated transitioning immediately to feature-length filmmaking, though industry constraints delayed her debut by several years.

== Career ==
While primarily a writer of short fiction, Jung originally conceived an animated project about a neglected cat that places a mouse in its owner's shoe to regain attention. She later adapted this premise into a live-action narrative by reimagining the feline protagonist as a child named Dohee. Set in an isolated rural village, the story follows Dohee and her protector, Yeongnam, depicting a bond between two women navigating an oppressive environment. Jung submitted her script to an industry-academia collaboration project organized by CJ ENM and the Korean Film Council, with filmmaker and Korea National University of Arts professor Lee Chang-dong serving as project advisor. Lee monitored the scenario development from the initial treatment stage and participated in the final evaluation. Although the script was omitted from the final selection, Jung contacted Lee afterward to advocate for the project's potential. Lee subsequently agreed to support the work, proposing that they produce it independently.

Jung made her feature-length directorial debut with the low-budget independent film A Girl at My Door (2014), produced by Lee Chang-dong and starring Bae Doo-na, Kim Sae-ron, and Song Sae-byeok. Upon release, the film received critical attention and was invited to the Un Certain Regard section of the Cannes International Film Festival, where it earned a standing ovation. It subsequently won several accolades, including the Best New Director award at the Baeksang Arts Awards and the Best Screenplay award at the Wildflower Film Awards.

== Filmography ==
=== Feature film ===
Year	Title		Role(s)		Ref.
Year	English	Korean	Director	Producer	Ref.
2014	A Girl at My Door	도희야	Yes	No	
2022	Next Sohee	다음 소희	Yes	No	
2026	Dora	도라	No	Yes	

=== Short film ===
Year	Title		Role(s)	Ref.
Year	English	Korean	Role(s)	Ref.
2006	The Wind Blows to the Hope	바람은 소망하는 곳으로 분다	Director, editor and art director	
2007	A Man Under the Influenza	영향 아래 있는 남자	Director, editor	
2008	11	11	Director	
2008	Let Us Go	갑시다	Assistant director	
2009	The Stopless Mind	마음	Assistant director	
2010	A Dog Came into My Flash	나의 플래시 속으로 들어온 개	Director	

== Accolades ==
=== Jury ===
- 2026: In October 2026, Jung served as a member of the Competition Jury at the 31st Busan International Film Festival.

=== Awards and nominations ===
Name of the award ceremony, year presented, category, nominee of the award, and the result of the nomination
Award ceremony	Year	Category	Nominee	Result	Ref.
Baeksang Arts Awards	2015	Best Film	A Girl at My Door	Nominated	
Baeksang Arts Awards	2015	Best New Director	A Girl at My Door	Won	
Baeksang Arts Awards	2023	Best Screenplay – Film	Next Sohee	Won	
Baeksang Arts Awards	2023	Gucci Impact Award	Next Sohee	Won	
Baeksang Arts Awards	2023	Best Director – Film	Next Sohee	Nominated	
Baeksang Arts Awards	2023	Best Film	Next Sohee	Nominated	
Bechdel Day	2023	Bechdel Choice 10 — Film	Next Sohee	Won	
Bechdel Day	2023	Bechdelian — Film director	Next Sohee	Won	
Blue Dragon Film Awards	2023	Best Director	Next Sohee	Nominated	
Blue Dragon Film Awards	2023	Best Film	Next Sohee	Nominated	
Blue Dragon Film Awards	2023	Best Screenplay	Next Sohee	Won	
Buil Film Awards	2014	Best New Director	A Girl at My Door	Won	
Buil Film Awards	2023	Best Director	Next Sohee	Won	
Buil Film Awards	2023	Best Film	Next Sohee	Nominated	
Buil Film Awards	2023	Best Screenplay	Next Sohee	Nominated	
Cine21 Film Awards	2023	Best screenplay	Next Sohee	Won	
Chunsa Film Art Awards	2015	Best New Director	A Girl at My Door	Nominated	
Chunsa Film Art Awards	2023	Un Certain Regard Director Award	Next Sohee	Won	
Director's Cut Awards	2024	Best Director	Next Sohee	Nominated	
Director's Cut Awards	2024	Best Screenplay	Next Sohee	Nominated	
Director's Cut Awards	2024	Vision Award	Next Sohee	Won	
42nd France Amiens International Film Festival	2022	Audience Award	Next Sohee	Won	
42nd France Amiens International Film Festival	2022	Special Mention Award & UPJV Reference Award	Next Sohee	Won	
42nd France Amiens International Film Festival	2022	UPJV Reference Award	Next Sohee	Won	
Fantasia International Film Festival	2022	Best Asian Feature silver award (Audience Award category)	Next Sohee	Won	
Fantasia International Film Festival	2022	Cheval Noir Award for Best director	Next Sohee	Won	
Korean Association of Film Critics Awards	2023	Best film	Next Sohee	Won	
10th Korean Film Producers Association Awards	2023	Best Picture award	Next Sohee	Won	
Grand Bell Awards	2014	Best New Director	A Girl at My Door	Nominated	
Grand Bell Awards	2023	Best Director	Next Sohee	Nominated	
Grand Bell Awards	2023	Best Film	Next Sohee	Nominated	
Grand Bell Awards	2023	Best Screenplay	Next Sohee	Nominated	
6th Pingyao International Film Festival	2023	Roberto Rossellini Best Film Award	Next Sohee	Won	
25th Stockholm International Film Festival	2014	Best First Film	A Girl at My Door	Won	
Tokyo Filmex	2022	Special Jury Award	Next Sohee	Won	
Wildflower Film Awards	2015	Best Director (Narrative Film)	A Girl at My Door	Nominated	
Wildflower Film Awards	2015	Best New Director	A Girl at My Door	Nominated	
Wildflower Film Awards	2015	Best Screenplay	A Girl at My Door	Won	
15th Women in Film Korea Awards	2014	Best Director/Screenwriter	A Girl at My Door	Won	

=== State honors ===
Name of country, award ceremony, year given, and name of honor
Country	Award Ceremony	Year	Honor	Ref.
France	Busan International Film Festival – the French Night (Note: Annual Event held at Busan International Film Festival by French Embassy in South Korea)	2026	Ordre des Arts et des Lettres Officier	

=== Listicles ===
Name of publisher, year listed, name of listicle, and placement
Publisher	Year	Listicle	Placement	Ref.
Cine21	2018	30 Korean Female Film Directors	Placed	
