= Bae Doona =

South Korean actress (born 1979)

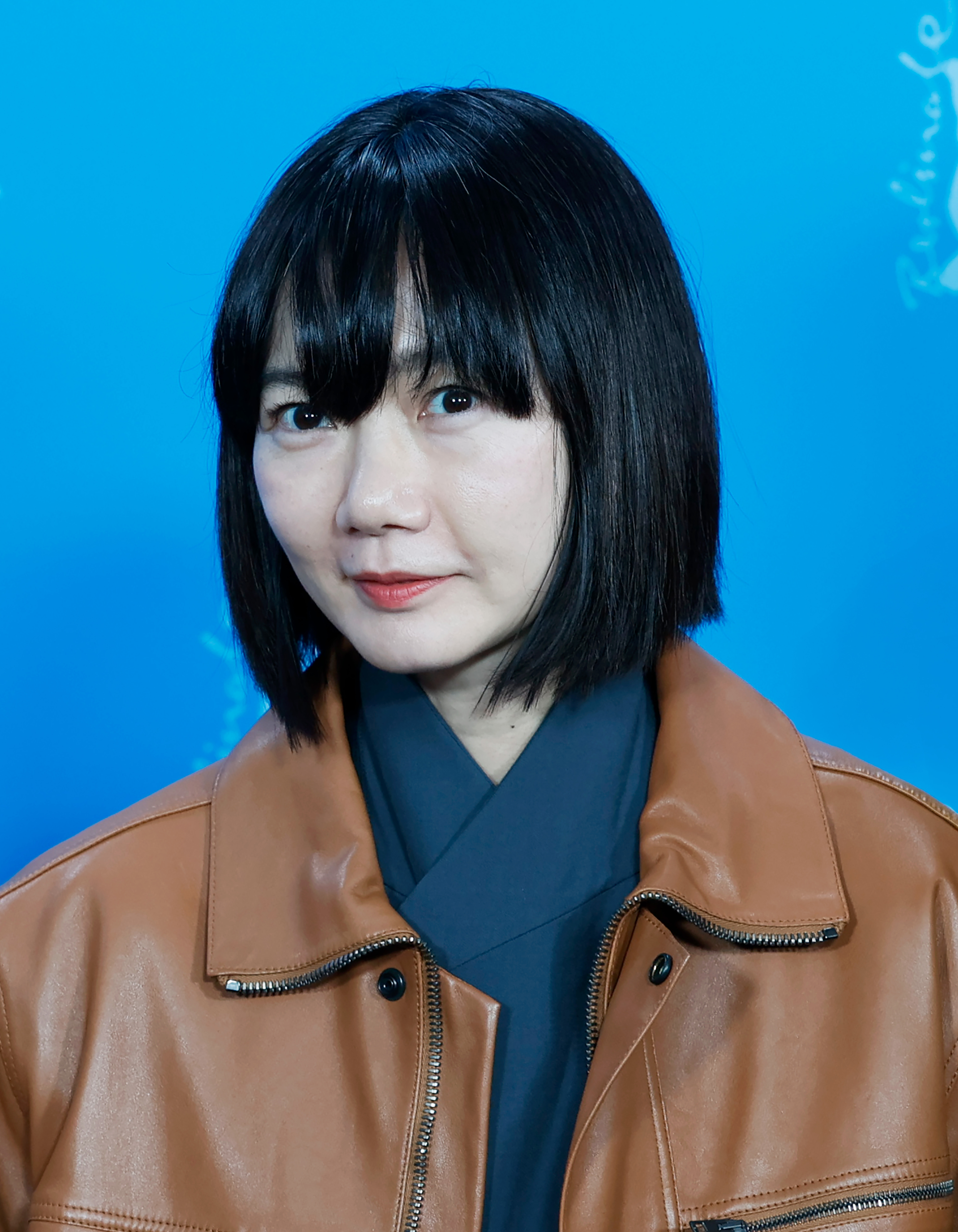
- Bae in 2026
- Born: October 11, 1979 (age 47); Seoul, South Korea
- Education: Konkuk University (Department of Film Arts)
- Occupations: Actress; photographer
- Years active: 1999–present
- Agent: Goodman Story

Korean name
- Hangul: 배두나
- Hanja: 裵斗娜
- RR: Bae Duna
- MR: Pae Tuna
- Website: www.doona.net

Bae Doona (Korean: 배두나; born October 11, 1979), anglicized as Doona Bae, is a South Korean actress and photographer. She debuted as a model and first gained recognition for her roles in Barking Dogs Never Bite (2000), Take Care of My Cat (2001), and Sympathy for Mr. Vengeance (2002). She became known for her performances as Son, a Korean exchange student in Linda Linda Linda (2005), archer Park Nam-joo in The Host (2006), and as a sex doll that comes to life in Air Doll (2009). She has also starred in A Girl at My Door (2014), Tunnel (2016), Broker and Next Sohee (both 2022).

On television, she is well known as a leading character in the crime thriller Stranger (2017–2020), the Netflix period zombie thriller Kingdom (2019–2020), and the drama Family Matters (2024). She is also recognized for her roles in the Wachowski films Cloud Atlas (2012) and Jupiter Ascending (2015), Zack Snyder's Rebel Moon films (2023–2024), and the Netflix television series Sense8 (2015–2018).

== Early life ==
Bae was born in Jongno District, Seoul, South Korea. Growing up, she accompanied her mother, stage actress Kim Hwa-young, to theater and rehearsal halls, learning lines of dialogue as she went along. This did not initially lead her toward acting, however; she said: "People might say that since my mother is a theater actor, I became an actress. But to me, those experiences probably had the opposite effect. On the contrary, because I saw many great actors working with my mother, I thought this was a job only people with extraordinary talent could do."

== Career ==
=== 1998–2005: Beginnings ===
As a Hanyang University student in 1998, Bae was scouted by a modeling agency in Seoul, leading to her modeling for COOLDOG's catalog among others. In 1999, she switched to acting before completing her studies at university, debuting in the TV drama School. Later that year, Bae appeared as Park Eun-suh in The Ring Virus, a Korean remake of the Japanese horror film Ring.

In 2000, director Bong Joon-ho cast Bae in the film Barking Dogs Never Bite for her willingness to do the part without makeup, which other South Korean actresses refused to do. She later cited it as the role that pushed her to pursue a serious acting career: "That film made me decide to become an actress—a good actress—and that film thereby changed my whole life." In Kim So-young's documentary Women's History Trilogy (2000–2004), Doona expressed her admiration for veteran South Korean actress Yoon Jeong-hee. In the same documentary, Bae said her most memorable scene had been being chased by the homeless man throughout the apartment in Barking Dogs Never Bite. That same year, she gave a risque performance (albeit with a body double for the more intense scenes) in Plum Blossom, and started getting more work on television. This was followed by 2001's Take Care of My Cat, directed by Jeong Jae-eun, and 2002's Sympathy for Mr. Vengeance, directed by Park Chan-wook.

In 2003, both Tube and Spring Bears Love disappointed at the box office. After completing principal photography on Spring Bears Love, she decided to take time off from film work, saying, "I’ve never really had nothing to do. The moment a film was released, I was almost always already shooting the next one [...] I thought to myself: Now my first cycle is really over. While I rest a little, I wanted to make a fresh start."

During her hiatus from film, she took up photography, examples of which can be seen on her official blog and in her published photo-essay books. She also continued to work on TV, starring in Country Princess and Rosemary. She appeared on stage in 2004 in a production of Sunday Seoul (not to be confused with the South Korean movie of the same title), a play co-written by Park Chan-wook. In 2005, she played an exchange student who joins a band in the Japanese film Linda Linda Linda, and played a divorced woman in the experimental omnibus TV series Beating Heart.

=== 2006–2009: Breakthrough ===
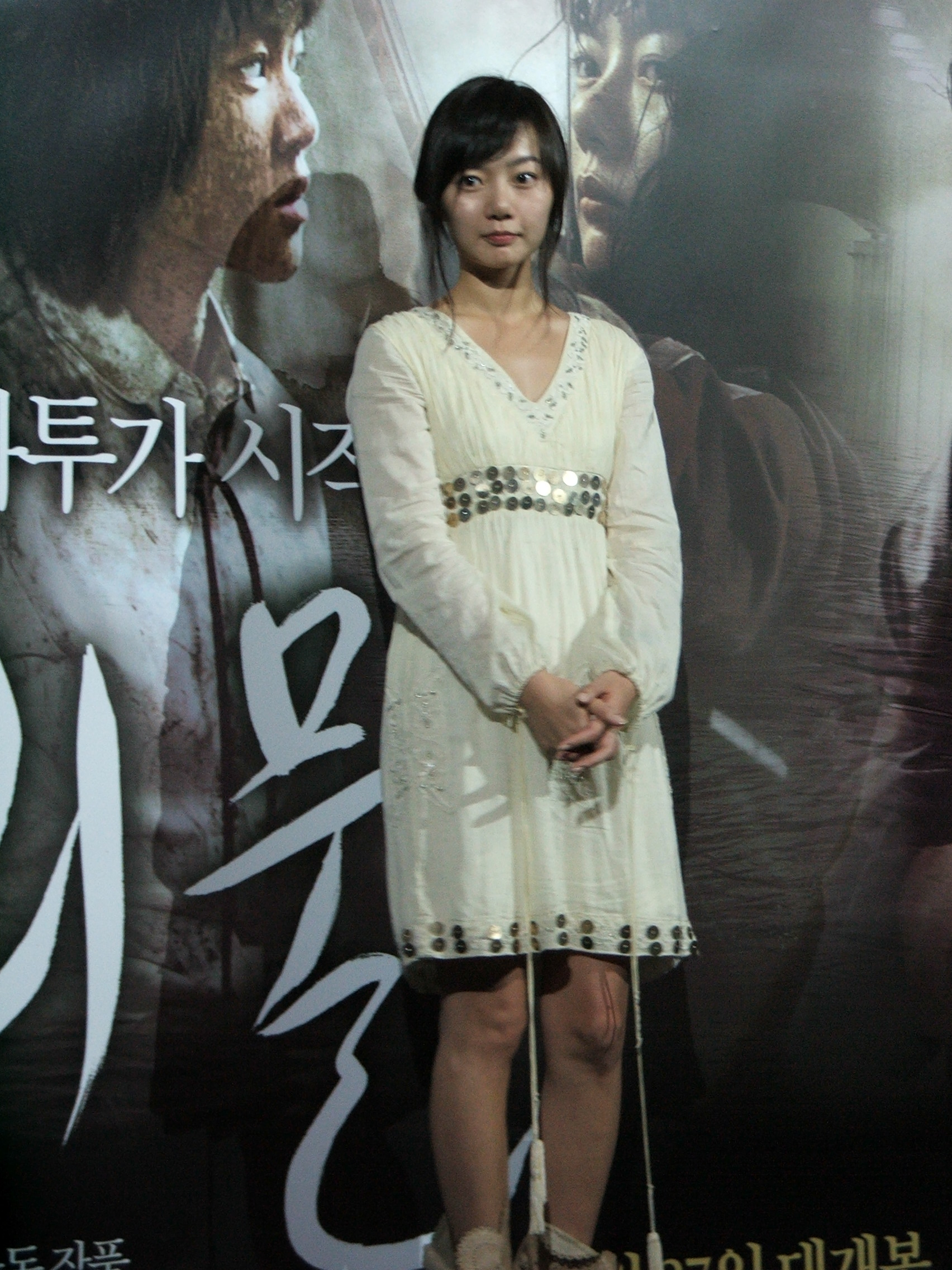
Bae Doona promoting The Host in 2006.

Bae reunited with Bong Joon-ho in the 2006 film The Host, which became the highest-grossing film in South Korean box office history. For her role, she trained in archery for months. She later returned to television, through the series Someday and How to Meet a Perfect Neighbor.

After winning accolades for Air Doll, a 2009 film by the Japanese director Hirokazu Kore-eda about an inflatable doll that develops consciousness and falls in love, Bae made back-to-back TV series in 2010, playing a high school teacher in Master of Study, and a night club singer in Gloria.

=== 2010–2012: As One and Hollywood debut ===
Her 2012 sports film As One was based on the true story of the 1991 world table tennis championship held in Chiba Prefecture, Japan, where North and South Korean players – Ri Bun-hui and Hyun Jung-hwa respectively – defeated the Chinese team. Bae and co-star Ha Ji-won were trained by Hyun herself, and Bae learned to play left-handed like Ri. Afterwards, she made a brief appearance in the science fiction film Doomsday Book.

Bae made her English-language Hollywood debut in Cloud Atlas, as Sonmi-451, a clone in a dystopian Korea. She also played the minor roles of Tilda Ewing, the wife of an abolitionist in pre-Civil War America, and a Mexican woman who crosses paths with an assassin. Co-directed by The Wachowskis and Tom Tykwer, the US$100 million adaptation of David Mitchell's novel premiered at the 2012 Toronto International Film Festival to mixed reviews, though Bae's performance was praised by critics. In a 2019 interview, she said of the Wachowskis, "They have become as important as my mother; they have my respect and my trust. When they contacted me to participate in Cloud Atlas, I couldn't believe it. We first met on Skype and I made a demo tape that I sent them. They gave me an important role despite my English weaknesses. I believe that a certain understanding developed between us at that time, which pushed me to follow them on Sense8. Thanks to them, I have had opportunities that are not given to all actors. Most importantly, it is the passion they bring to their work that has made our collaboration so enjoyable. They made me want to surpass myself and enabled me to overcome fear and limits."

=== 2014–2017: Return to South Korea ===
Back in South Korea, Bae next starred in the 2014 film A Girl at My Door, directed by July Jung and produced by Lee Chang-dong. Playing a small-town police officer who tries to save a mysterious young girl she suspects is a victim of domestic violence, Bae said she was so fascinated by the story and emotionally challenging role that she decided to star in the movie without pay three hours after reading the script. The film premiered in the Un Certain Regard section of the 2014 Cannes Film Festival, and Bae later won Best Actress at the Asian Film Awards for her performance.

In 2015, she again worked with the Wachowskis for their space opera Jupiter Ascending, in which she played a small supporting role as a bounty hunter. This was followed by Sense8, an American science fiction series created by the Wachowskis and co-written by J. Michael Straczynski. Concerning eight strangers from different cultures and parts of the world who share a violent psychic vision and suddenly find themselves telepathically connected, Sense8 began streaming on Netflix in 2015.

Bae then appeared in a 90-minute web film directed by her older brother, commercial director Bae Doo-han. Titled Red Carpet Dream, it is a biopic of how Bae dreamed of becoming an actress when she was young and her subsequent 20-year acting career. Commissioned for the 20th anniversary of the Busan International Film Festival and sponsored by MAC Cosmetics, the film screened at the festival as well as on Facebook and on the cable channel CGV.

Back on the big screen, Bae starred alongside Ha Jung-woo in the survival drama film The Tunnel. She then teamed up with Japanese director Shunji Iwai and actor Kim Joo-hyuk for the short film, Chang-ok's Letter.

Bae returned to Korean TV screens in 2017 with the crime thriller Stranger, playing the passionate and empathetic police officer Lieutenant Han Yeo-jin, contrasting with Cho Seung-woo's prosecutor Hwang Si-mok. The series was a huge success and garnered positive reviews for its tight plot, gripping sequences and strong performances. The series was renewed for a second season in 2020, with her character promoted to the rank of Senior Inspector.

=== 2018–present: Continued success ===
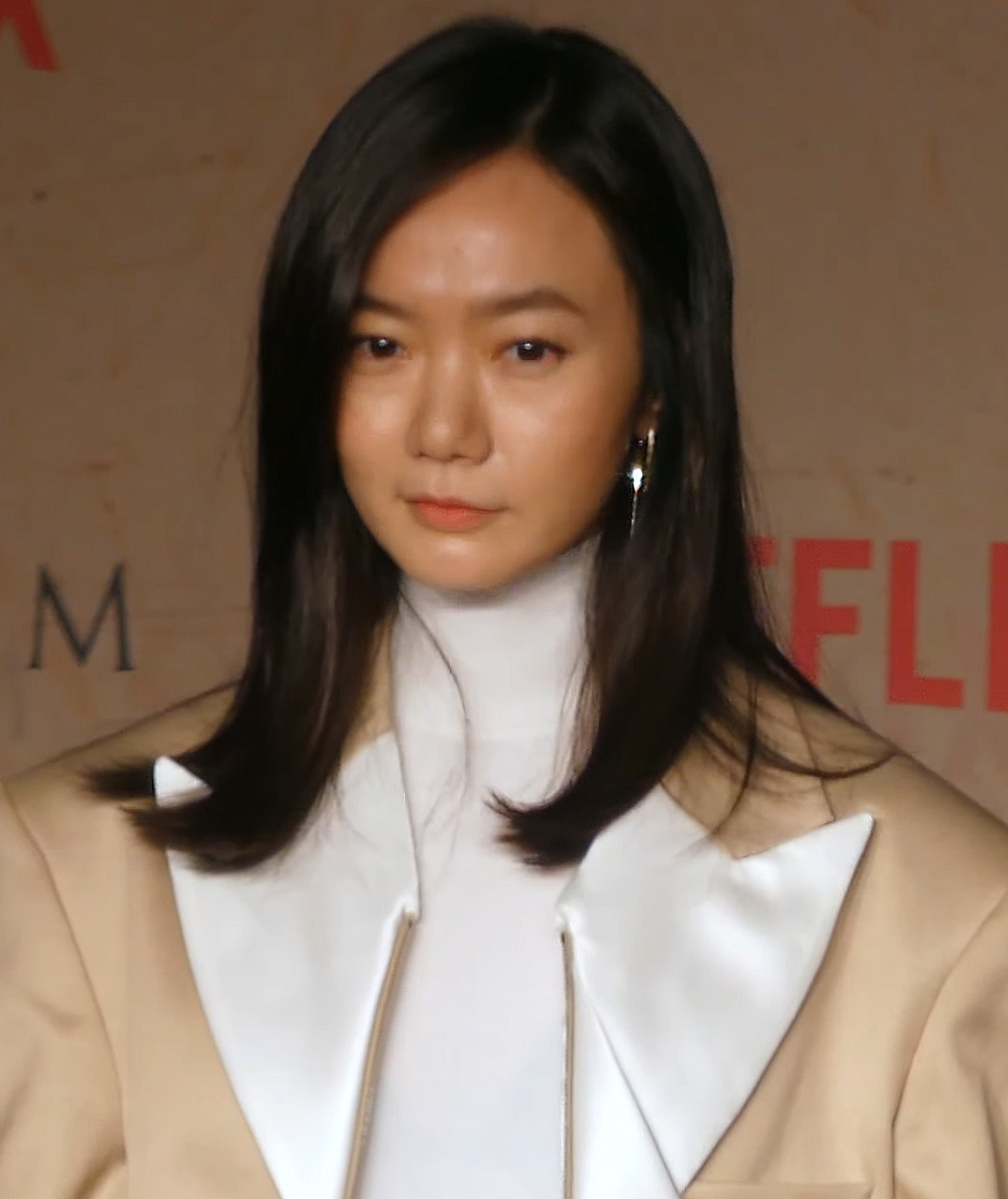
Bae in January 2019

In June 2018, Bae was one of 14 professionals from the Korean film industry invited to join the Academy of Motion Picture Arts and Sciences (AMPAS). The same year, she starred in the crime thriller The Drug King. She also starred in both seasons of the 2019 Netflix period zombie series Kingdom, and the romance drama Matrimonial Chaos, a remake of a Japanese television series.

Bae also starred in a French-speaking role in the romantic comedy film Je Suis La in 2019, starring alongside Alain Chabat. She was cast in the 2021 Netflix sci-fi thriller The Silent Sea, alongside Gong Yoo, Lee Moo-saeng and Kim Sun-young. In 2022, she appeared in Jung Ju-ri's film Next Sohee, and Hirokazu Kore-eda's film Broker.

On March 3, 2023, Bae signed with Goodman Story Entertainment. Bae Doona will be an international Jury Member for the 76th Berlin International Film Festival in 2026.

== Filmography ==
=== Film ===
Key
†	Denotes films that have not yet been released

Year	Title	Role	Notes	Ref.
1999	The Ring Virus	Park Eun-suh		
2000	Barking Dogs Never Bite	Park Hyun-nam		
2000	Plum Blossom	Seo Nam-ok		
2001	Take Care of My Cat	Yoo Tae-hee		
2002	Sympathy for Mr. Vengeance	Cha Young-mi		
2002	Saving My Hubby	Jung Geum-soon		
2003	Tube	Song In-kyung		
2003	Spring Bears Love	Jung Hyun-chae		
2005	Tea Date	Sun-hee	Short film	
2005	Linda Linda Linda	Son		
2006	The Host	Park Nam-joo		
2009	Air Doll	Nozomi		
2012	Doomsday Book	Adult Park Min-seo (cameo)	Segment: "Happy Birthday"	
2012	As One	Li Bun-hui		
2012	Cloud Atlas	Sonmi-451 / Sonmi-351 / Tilda Ewing / Megan's Mom / Mexican Woman	Hollywood debut	
2014	A Girl at My Door	Lee Young-nam		
2015	Jupiter Ascending	Razo		
2016	Tunnel	Se-hyun		
2017	Chang-ok's Letter	Eun-ha	Short film	
2018	The Drug King	Kim Jeong-ah		
2019	Persona	Doona	Segment: "Love Set"	
2019	#Iamhere	Soo		
2022	Next Sohee	Yoo-jin		
2022	Broker	Soo-jin		
2023	Rebel Moon – Part One: A Child of Fire	Nemesis		
2024	Rebel Moon – Part Two: The Scargiver	Nemesis		
2025	Virus	Ok Taek-seon		
2026	Alpha Gang †		Post-production	

=== Television ===
Year	Title	Role	Notes	Ref.
1998	Angel's Kiss	—N/a		
1999	School 1	Doona Bae		
1999	Ad Madness	Pyo Roo-na		
2000	Love Story: "Miss Hip-hop and Mr. Rock"	Young-yi	One-act drama	
2000	Look Back in Anger	Lee Mi-na		
2000	Cruise Ship of Love	Doona Bae		
2000	RNA	Park Se-mi		
2000	I Want To Keep Seeing You	Ham Choon-bong		
2000	Mom and Sister	Gong Chan-mi		
2001	Open Drama Man & Woman: "You Say It's Love, But I Think It's Desire"	Shin Jung-min	One-act drama	
2003	Country Princess	Lee Eun-hee		
2003	Rosemary	Shin Kyung-soo		
2005	Beating Heart	Doona Bae		
2006	Someday	Hana Yamaguchi		
2007	How to Meet a Perfect Neighbor	Jung Yoon-hee		
2010	Master of Study	Han Soo-jung		
2010	Gloria	Na Jin-jin		
2015–2018	Sense8	Sun Bak		
2017–2020	Stranger	Han Yeo-jin		
2018	Matrimonial Chaos	Kang Hwi-roo		
2019–2020	Kingdom	Seo-bi		
2021	The Silent Sea	Song Ji-an		
2024	Family Matters	Han Young-soo		
2025	Encyclopedia of Useless Facts Around the Earth	mc		

=== Music video appearances ===
Year	Song title	Artist
2000	"You"	Fish
2000	"Party Time"	Ray Jay
2000	"단"	Kim Don-kyoo
2007	"Every Time I Look at You"	Kang Kyun-sung
2009	"Tsumetai Ame"	Every Little Thing
2010	"Seesaw" / "Confession"	Hot Potato
2010	"Temperature of Separation"	Yoon Jong-shin feat. You Hee-yeol

=== Hosting ===
Year	Title	Notes
1999	Music Camp	MC
1999	Radio TenTen Club	DJ

== Theater ==
Year	Title	Role	Notes	Ref.
2002	Roberto Succo	—N/a	Producer	Ref.
2004	Sunday Seoul (선데이 서울)		Actress, producer	
2008	The Visit		Producer	

== Discography ==
=== Soundtrack appearances ===
Year	Track	From Album
2005	"Linda Linda"	Linda Linda Linda OST; We are Paran Maum EP
2005	"Boku no Migite" (僕の右手; My Right Hand)	Linda Linda Linda OST; We are Paran Maum EP
2005	"Owaranai Uta" (終わらない歌; Never-ending Song)	Linda Linda Linda OST; We are Paran Maum EP
2010	"Gloria" (글로리아)	Gloria OST
2010	"I'm a Fool" (바보랍니다)	Gloria OST
2010	"Ready to Fly" (feat. Jung Jae-yeon)	Gloria OST

== Bibliography ==
Year	Title	Publisher	ISBN
2006	Doona's London Play	Taste Factory	ISBN 89-958439-0-X
2007	Doona's Tokyo Play	Taste Factory	ISBN 89-958439-5-0
2008	Doona's Seoul Play	Chung-Ang Books	ISBN 978-89-6188-765-6

== Awards and nominations ==
Name of the award ceremony, year presented, category, nominee of the award, and the result of the nomination
Award ceremony	Year	Category	Nominee / Work	Result	Ref.
Asia Contents Awards	2021	Best Actress	Stranger 2	Nominated	
Asian Film Awards	2010	Best Actress	Air Doll	Nominated	
Asian Film Awards	2015	Best Actress	A Girl at My Door	Won	
Asian Film Critics Association Awards	2017	Best Supporting Actress	Tunnel	Nominated	
Asian Television Awards	2025	Best Actress in a Leading Role	Family Matters	Nominated	
Baeksang Arts Awards	2002	Best Actress – Film	Take Care of My Cat	Won	
Baeksang Arts Awards	2015	Best Actress – Film	A Girl at My Door	Nominated	
Baeksang Arts Awards	2017	Best Supporting Actress – Film	Tunnel	Nominated	
Baeksang Arts Awards	2023	Best Actress – Film	Next Sohee	Nominated	
Baeksang Arts Awards	2023	Best Supporting Actress – Film	Broker	Nominated	
Blue Dragon Film Awards	2000	Best New Actress	Barking Dogs Never Bite	Won	
Blue Dragon Film Awards	2002	Best Actress	Sympathy for Mr. Vengeance	Nominated	
Blue Dragon Film Awards	2006	Best Supporting Actress	The Host	Nominated	
Blue Dragon Film Awards	2016	Popular Star Award	Tunnel	Won	
Blue Dragon Film Awards	2016	Best Supporting Actress	Tunnel	Nominated	
Buil Film Awards	2014	Best Actress	A Girl at My Door	Nominated	
Buil Film Awards	2017	Best Supporting Actress	Tunnel	Nominated	
Buil Film Awards	2023	The Yoo Hyun-mok Film Arts Award	Next Sohee	Won	
Buil Film Awards	2023	Best Actress	Next Sohee	Nominated	
Busan Film Critics Awards	2002	Best Actress	Take Care of My Cat	Won	
Busan International Film Festival	2019	'Etoile du Cinéma' (Cinema Star)	Bae Doona	Won	
Chlotrudis Awards	2008	Best Supporting Actress	Linda Linda Linda	Nominated	
Chunsa Film Art Awards	2001	Best Actress	Take Care of My Cat	Won	
Chunsa Film Art Awards	2006	Best Supporting Actress	The Host	Nominated	
Chunsa Film Art Awards	2015	Best Actress	A Girl at My Door	Won	
Chunsa Film Art Awards	2017	Best Supporting Actress	Tunnel	Nominated	
CinEuphoria Awards	2013	Best Supporting Actress	Cloud Atlas	Nominated	
ContentAsia Awards	2025	Best Female Lead in a TV Programme/Series Made in Asia	Family Matters	Won	
Director's Cut Awards	2000	Best New Actress in Film	Plum Blossom	Won	
Director's Cut Awards	2006	Best Actress in Film	The Host	Won	
Director's Cut Awards	2024	Best Actress in Film	Next Sohee	Nominated	
Director's Cut Awards	2025	Best Actress in a Series	Family Matters	Won	
Elle Style Awards	2017	Super Icon (Female)	Bae Doona	Won	
Golden Rooster and Hundred Flowers Awards	2014	Best Actress in a Foreign Film	A Girl at My Door	Won	
Grand Bell Awards	2000	Best New Actress	Barking Dogs Never Bite	Nominated	
Grand Bell Awards	2016	Best Actress	Tunnel	Nominated	
Grand Bell Awards	2023	Best Actress	Next Sohee	Nominated	
International Online Cinema Awards	2013	Best Supporting Actress	Cloud Atlas	Nominated	
Japan Academy Film Prize	2010	Best Actress	Air Doll	Nominated	
Japan Film Professional Awards	2009	Best Actress	Air Doll	Won	
KBS Drama Awards	1999	Best New Actress	School 1 / Ad Madness	Won	
KBS Drama Awards	2000	Popularity Award	RNA	Won	
KBS Drama Awards	2010	Excellence Award, Actress in a Miniseries	Master of Study	Nominated	
KBS Drama Awards	2018	Best Couple Award	Bae Doona (with Cha Tae-hyun); Matrimonial Chaos	Won	
KBS Drama Awards	2018	Excellence Award, Actress in a Miniseries	Matrimonial Chaos	Nominated	
KBS Drama Awards	2018	Top Excellence Award, Actress	Matrimonial Chaos	Nominated	
Korean Association of Film Critics Awards	2001	Best Actress	Take Care of My Cat	Won	
Marie Claire Film Festival	2023	Pioneer Award	Bae Doona	Won	
MBC Drama Awards	2003	Excellence Award, Actress	Country Princess	Nominated	
MBC Drama Awards	2010	Excellence Award, Actress	Gloria	Nominated	
SBS Drama Awards	2007	Excellence Award, Actress in a Miniseries	How to Meet a Perfect Neighbor	Nominated	
Takasaki Film Festival	2010	Best Actress	Air Doll	Won	
Tokyo Sports Film Awards	2010	Best Actress	Air Doll	Won	
Wildflower Film Awards	2015	Best Actress	A Girl at My Door	Nominated	
Wildflower Film Awards	2024	Best Actress	Next Sohee	Nominated	
Women in Film Korea Awards	2001	Best Actress	Take Care of My Cat	Won	
