= Baeksang Arts Award for Best Entertainment Program =

South Korean annual television award

- Awarded for: Best South Korean entertainment program of the year
- Country: South Korea
- Presented by: Baeksang Arts Awards
- Most recent winner: Punghyanggo (2025)
- Website: baeksangartsawards

The Baeksang Arts Award for Best Entertainment Program (Korean: 백상예술대상 TV부문 예능 작품상; RR: Baeksang Yesul Daesang TV Bumun Yeneung Jakpumsang) is annually presented at the Baeksang Arts Awards ceremony. In 2023, for the first time in the history of the awards, a YouTube show received the recognition.

== List of winners ==
#	Year	Program	Network
34	1998	Lee Hong-ryul Show (이홍렬쇼)	SBS
35	1999	Kim Gook-jin and Kim Yong-man's 21st Century Commission (김국진 김용만의 21세기위원회)	MBC
36	2000	Gag Concert	KBS
37	2001	Truth Game (진실게임); Comedy House (코미디하우스)	SBS; MBC
38	2002	Sunday Sunday Night	MBC
39	2003	Exclamation Mark! (!느낌표)	MBC
40	2004	Comedy House (코미디하우스)	MBC
41	2005	Hello Franceska	MBC
42	2006	Sang Sang Plus (상상플러스 )	KBS
43	2007	Global Talk Show	KBS
44	2008	Infinite Challenge	MBC
45	2009	Gag Concert	KBS
46	2010	High Kick Through the Roof	MBC
47	2011	Come to Play (놀러와), C'est Si Bon Concert (세시봉콘서트)	MBC
48	2012	Gag Concert	KBS
49	2013	Dad! Where Are We Going?	MBC
50	2014	Grandpas Over Flowers	tvN
51	2015	Non-Summit	JTBC
52	2016	King of Mask Singer	MBC
53	2017	My Little Old Boy	SBS
54	2018	Hyori's Homestay	JTBC
55	2019	Omniscient Interfering View	MBC
56	2020	Mr. Trot	TV Chosun
57	2021	Hangout with Yoo	MBC
58	2022	Street Woman Fighter	Mnet
59	2023	Psick Show Season 3	Psick University's YouTube Channel
60	2024	Adventure By Accident 2 (태어난 김에 세계일주 2)	MBC
61	2025	Punghyanggo (풍향고)	DdeunDdeun's YouTube Channel
62	2026	The Wonder Coach	MBC

== Sources ==
- "Baeksang Arts Awards Nominees and Winners Lists". Naver Movie (in Korean).
- "Baeksang Arts Awards Winners Lists". Baeksang Arts Awards (in Korean).
