= Baeksang Arts Award for Best New Director – Film =

Annual South Korean film award

- Country: South Korea
- Presented by: Baeksang Arts Awards
- Most recent winner: Park Joon-ho; 3670 (2026)
- Website: baeksangartsawards

The Baeksang Arts Award for Best New Director – Film (Korean: 백상예술대상 영화부문 신인 감독상; RR: Baeksang Yesul Daesang Yeonghwa Bumun Sinin Gamdoksang) is annually presented at the Baeksang Arts Awards ceremony.

== List of winners ==
=== 1960s ===
| Year | Winner | Film |
|---|---|---|
| 1969 (5th) | Choi Ha-won | Trees Stand on Slope (나무들 비탈에 서다) |

=== 1970s ===
| Year | Winner | Film |
|---|---|---|
| 1970 (6th) | Jo Munjin | |
| 1971 (7th) | Hwang Hyemi | First Experience (첫경험) |
| 1972 (8th) | Shin Seong-il | Spring, Summer, Fall and Winter (봄 여름 가을 그리고 겨울) |
| 1975 (11th) | Lee Jang-ho | The Stars Heavenly Home (별들의 고향) |
| 1976 (12th) | Park Namsu | Lovers (연인들) |
| 1979 (15th) | Lee Gyeongtae | City Hunter (도시의 사냥꾼) |

=== 1980s ===
| Year | Winner | Film |
|---|---|---|
| 1980 (16th) | Park Chul-soo | The Rain at Night |
| 1983 (19th) | Bae Chang-ho | People in the Slum (꼬방동네 사람들) |
| 1985 (21st) | Kim Hyeonmyeong | Agada (아가다) |
| 1986 (22nd) | Shin Seung-su | Dreams of the Strong (장사의 꿈) |
| 1987 (23rd) | Choi Wonyeong | Open Your Heart (가슴을 펴라) |
| 1988 (24th) | Lee Mirye | Forget me not (물망초) |
| 1989 (25th) | Park Kwang-su | Chilsu and Mansu |

=== 1990s ===
| Year | Winner | Film |
|---|---|---|
| 1990 (26th) | Jang Sun-woo | The Lovers of Woomook-baemi |
| 1991 (27th) | Nam Manwon | Milk Chocolate (밀크초콜릿) |
| 1992 (28th) | Kim Yeongbin | Kim's War (김의 전쟁) |
| 1993 (29th) | Jang Hyeonsu | Walking to Heaven (걸어서 하늘까지) |
| 1994 (30th) | Lee Jung-gook | The Song of Resurrection (부활의 노래) |
| 1995 (31st) | Kim Hongjun | Rosy Life (장미빛 인생) |
| 1996 (32nd) | Lee Minyong | A Hot Roof (개 같은 날의 오후) |
| 1997 (33rd) | Lee Chang-dong | Green Fish |
| 1998 (34th) | Hur Jin-ho | Christmas in August |
| 1999 (35th) | Lee Kwang-mo | Spring in My Hometown |

=== 2000s ===
| Year | Winner | Film |
|---|---|---|
| 2001 (37th) | Park Heung-sik | I Wish I Had a Wife |
| 2002 (38th) | Yoon Jong-chan | Sorum |
| 2003 (39th) | Kim Hyun-seok | YMCA Baseball Team |
| 2004 (40th) | Lee Su-yeon | The Uninvited |
| 2005 (41st) | Kim Soo-hyun | So Cute |
| 2006 (42nd) | Kim Dae-woo | Forbidden Quest |
| 2007 (43rd) | Jeon Kye-soo | Midnight Ballad for Ghost Theater |
| 2008 (44th) | Na Hong-jin | The Chaser |
| 2009 (45th) | Lee Chung-ryoul | Old Partner |

=== 2010s ===
| Year | Winner | Film |
|---|---|---|
| 2010 (46th) | Lee Ho-jae | The Scam |
| 2011 (47th) | Kim Young-tak | Hello Ghost |
| 2012 (48th) | Im Chan-ik | Officer of the Year |
| 2013 (49th) | Jo Sung-hee | A Werewolf Boy |
| 2014 (50th) | Yang Woo-suk | The Attorney |
| 2015 (51st) | July Jung | A Girl at My Door |
| 2016 (52nd) | Han Jun-hee | Coin Locker Girl |
| 2017 (53rd) | Yeon Sang-ho | Train to Busan |
| 2018 (54th) | Kang Yoon-sung | The Outlaws |
| 2019 (55th) | Lee Ji-won | Miss Baek |

=== 2020s ===
| Year | Winner | Film |
|---|---|---|
| 2020 (56th) | Kim Do-young | Kim Ji-young: Born 1982 |
| 2021 (57th) | Yoon Dan-bi | Moving On [ko] |
| 2022 (58th) | Jo Eun-ji | Perhaps Love |
| 2023 (59th) | Ahn Tae-jin | The Night Owl |
| 2024 (60th) | Lee Jung-hong | A Wild Roomer [ko] |
| 2025 (61st) | Oh Jung-min | House of the Seasons (장손) |
| 2026 (62nd) | Park Joon-ho | 3670 |

== Sources ==
- "Baeksang Arts Awards Nominees and Winners Lists". Naver Movie (in Korean).
- "Baeksang Arts Awards Winners Lists". Baeksang Arts Awards (in Korean).
