= Psick University =

South Korean YouTuber

YouTube information
- Channels: 피식대학; 피식사이버대학
- Years active: 2019–present
- Genres: comedy; talk show
- Subscribers: 3.18 million
- Views: 1.9 billion
- Last updated: May 2024

Psick University (Korean: 피식대학) is a YouTube comedy channel based out of South Korea. Composed of SBS and KBS comedians Lee Yong-ju, Jeong Jae-hyung, and Kim Min-soo, the group started YouTube in April 2019 and first became recognized after releasing a North Korean defector hidden camera prank. Their sketch comedy series, such as One Love Alpine Club (한사랑 산악회) and Untact Date (B대면데이트), also gained popularity. In 2023, their talk show series Psick Show won the Baeksang Arts Awards.

== Awards and nominations ==
Name of the award ceremony, year presented, category, nominee of the award, and the result of the nomination
Award ceremony	Year	Category	Nominee / Work	Result	Ref.
Baeksang Arts Awards	2023	Best Entertainment Program	Psick Show	Won	
