= Next Sohee =

2022 South Korean drama film

- Theatrical release poster
- Hangul: 다음 소희
- RR: Daeum Sohui
- MR: Taŭm Sohŭi
- Directed by: Jung Ju-ri
- Written by: Jung Ju-ri
- Produced by: Kim Dong-ha; Kim Ji-yeon
- Starring: Kim Si-eun; Bae Doona
- Cinematography: Kim Il-yeon
- Edited by: Lee Young-lim; Han Ji-youn
- Music by: Jang Young-gyu
- Production companies: Twin Plus Partners Co. Ltd.; Crank-Up Film Co. Ltd.; Solaire Partners
- Distributed by: Twin Plus Partners Co. Ltd. (South Korea); Zurty Studios/Echelon Studios (North America)
- Release dates: May 25, 2022 (Cannes); February 8, 2023 (South Korea); June 12, 2025 (North America)
- Running time: 135 minutes
- Country: South Korea
- Language: Korean
- Box office: US$1.4 million

Next Sohee (Korean: 다음 소희) is a 2022 South Korean drama film, directed by Jung Ju-ri and starring Bae Doona and Kim Si-eun. The film revolves around a business-oriented high school student, Sohee (Kim Si-eun), who has to go on field training to her call center, and a female detective, Yu-jin, who investigates her subsequent death. It is loosely inspired by the real-life suicide of a girl on a similar temporary training program. It was selected as the first Korean closing film at the 2022 Cannes Film Festival and screened as part of the Critics' Week section for special screenings.

The film was screened on May 25, 2022 at Espace Miramar in Cannes and received a 7 minute standing ovation. It was also screened at the 26th Fantasia International Film Festival as the closing film and won the Best Director award in the Cheval Noir competition category and the Best Asian Feature silver award in the Audience Award category. It was released on February 8, 2023 in South Korea.

== Synopsis ==
The film is about Sohee (Kim Si-eun), a high school student who starts training for a subcontracted position at a call center. She is unable to bear the stressful work culture. A mysterious incident leads to her death. Detective Oh Yoo-jin (Bae Doona) starts an investigation into her death.

== Plot ==
Sohee, a high school student who enjoys dancing in her spare time, is called in by one of her teachers, who informs her that he has finally managed to get her an externship spot in a company called Human and Net, one of the many call service centers for S-Plus Korea Telecom (a fictional telecommunications company). Before starting her externship, Sohee has to attend a training session, which turns out to consist of makeup lessons and body shaming of the trainees. Once she starts her externship, Sohee quickly learns that the main goal of the company is actually to increase and maintain sales of S-Plus's subscription services rather than help customers who wish to cancel their subscriptions or are experiencing technical difficulties. She is advised to stall the customers as much as possible so that they will eventually change their minds and decide to keep their services or buy other services that S-Plus telecom provides. Throughout her externship, Sohee has to deal with verbal abuse from rude customers who yell and swear at her, even experiencing an incident in which a customer insinuates that he will sexually assault her, causing her to lose her temper and yell back. Sohee also notices how she is getting exploited by the company as she is underpaid with the excuse of being an extern. Sohee also occasionally has to attend team meetings, which consist of reprimands for not being the top performing call center under S-Plus. Junho, Sohee's manager, is the only person in the call center who is understanding and tries to help Sohee and the other workers as much as he can. One day, while walking to work, Sohee witnesses the discovery of Junho's dead body in his car parked outside the parking lot of the company building. It is implied that he died by suicide through carbon monoxide poisoning. It turns out that Junho felt guilty about the exploitation of labour of the externs and had sent in whistleblower complaint letters to upper management, yet his complaints were ignored.

A new female manager takes over and she is very focused on driving up sales. She pressures Sohee into signing a form that refutes the complaints made by Junho (which Sohee unwillingly signs). At a company dinner, Sohee gets into a fight with one of the externs who blames her for performing so well and hence causing the other externs' added pressure to increase their sales too. After yet again experiencing partial payment for her work, despite now meeting her sales targets, Sohee starts to focus on actually processing customer requests to cancel their subscriptions and services from S-Plus instead of persuading them to pay more for other services. Her manager witnesses this and angrily reprimands Sohee, so Sohee calls out the blatant exploitation of externs in the company as well as the multiple instances of her underpaid work, prompting the manager to mock Sohee for being poor and begging for money, which angers Sohee, prompting her to hit the manager. She is subsequently put on three days of unpaid disciplinary leave of absence. While on leave and struggling with guilt over signing the form stating that Junho's claims about the company's mistreatment of externs were false, Sohee slits her wrists while out drinking with a friend and is subsequently hospitalized. Sohee asks to quit her externship, but her teacher simply scolds her and tells her to return to work. Depressed at the prospect of returning to the call center and slightly intoxicated from drinking alcohol, Sohee commits suicide by jumping into a reservoir after a night out with friends.

The second half of the film follows the investigations of Yoojin, a female detective officer into the suicide of Sohee after her body is found as well as reinvestigations of Junho's suicide, which further details Human and Net's violation of labour laws on their workers in order to drive up sales as well as Sohee's high school's irresponsible choices of externship placements for their students in order to meet an employment rate. Throughout the investigations, Human and Net and the school's management constantly blame Sohee for her own suicide citing that she was undisciplined and had temper issues. Yoojin tries to take legal action against these institutions for their actions leading up to Sohee's suicide but is constantly reprimanded by her own superior to let go of the case as it is causing them trouble. The movie ends with Yoojin tearfully watching an old video recording of Sohee practicing a dance routine in a studio which was the only video left on Sohee's now retrieved phone before she turned it off and committed suicide. It is unknown to the viewers whether Human and Net or the school ultimately changed their unsafe practices following the suicide of Sohee.

== Cast ==
- Bae Doona as Yoo-jin
- Kim Si-eun as So-hee
- Sim Hee-seop as Lee Jun-ho
- Park Woo-young as Dong-ho
- Yoo Jung-ho as Manager of the SAVE department of the call center
- Choi Hee-jin as Lee Bo-ram
- Jung Hoe-rin as Jun-hee
- Park Soo-young as Vice Principal
- Kim Woo-kyum
- Song Yo-sep

== Production ==
At the end of 2016, director July Jung saw a story of a high school girl sent by her school to work as an intern in a telecommunication company's call center to gain real-world work experience. But, within three months she committed suicide on her job. The investigation brought to the surface that the girl experienced stressful working conditions in the call center. This story became the basis of her film titled Next Sohee.

Next Sohee is Jung's second film, following the 2014 detective drama A Girl at My Door, which also starred Bae Doona and was invited to the "Un Certain Regard" selection of the 67th Cannes Film Festival.

Principal photography began on January 16, 2022 and filming wrapped on February 28, 2022.

== Release ==
The film had its world premiere at the Critics' Week, a parallel section of the Cannes Film Festival, on 25 May 2022 at the Espace Miramar theater. Subsequently it will be released in South Korea in 2022. It was also invited to the competition section of the Amsterdam Film Festival, and selected as the closing film of the 26th Fantasia International Film Festival in the Cheval Noir section, where it was screened on August 3, 2022. At the festival it won the Best Director award in the Cheval Noir competition category and the Best Asian Feature silver award in the Audience Award category. It also made it to the 'Korean Cinema Today - Panorama' section of the 27th Busan International Film Festival and was screened on October 6, 2022. In January 2023 it was screened at The 34th Palm Springs International Film Festival on January 8, 2023, and at the 6th Pingyao International Film Festival held from 14 to 19 January 2023, where it won Roberto Rossellini Best Film Award.

The film was released theatrically in South Korea on February 8, 2023 by Twin Plus Partners, and on June 12, 2025 in the United States and Canada, by Zurty Studios and Echelon Studios.

=== Home media ===
The film was made available for streaming on IPTV (KT olleh TV, SK Btv, LG U+ TV), Home Choice, Google Play, satellite TV (Skylife), WAVVE, Naver Series ON, Cinefox, Watcha Play, and Webhard from March 16, 2023.

== Reception ==
=== Box office ===
The film was released theatrically on 562 screens on February 8, 2023.

As of December 31, 2023, with gross of US$858,534 and 118,899 admissions, it is at the 41st place among Korean films released in 2023.

=== Critical response ===
On the review aggregator Rotten Tomatoes website, the film has an approval rating of 94% based on 17 reviews, with an average rating of 8/10.

The film has received positive reviews from international critics. It received a standing ovation of 7 minutes at the premiere at the Cannes Film Festival. Patrick Brzeski of The Hollywood Reporter introduced Next Sohee as "Cannes' hidden gem". Whereas Wendy Ide of Screen Daily found the film "leisurely paced" and appreciated the direction of Jung Ju-ri writing, "Jung's direction is unshowy but solid, with minimal score and a focus on persuasive performances captured by an empathetic lens." However, Ide criticized her writing, stating, "this has the feel of a screenplay which could have benefited by a sharper focus and a leaner approach to its storytelling." Clarence Tsui of the South China Morning Post gave the film 4 stars out of 5 and praised the performance of Kim Si-eun writing, "Kim puts in a powerful performance as a student crushed by her work at a call centre." He opined that the film could be "delineated into two halves that could be described as the 'personal' and the 'political'". In the second half Bae Doona takes over the story as detective Yoo-jin, where she investigates Sohee's demise and seeks justice. Concluding his review, Tsui wrote, "Jung has stirred up a stink with a film that's visceral to the extreme in revealing the dark dealings that make an economy click, and a steep warning about the possibilities of more Sohees to suffer from such indignity and injustice."

Elena Lazic writing for The Playlist criticized the director's approach on handling the film, writing, "the director opts for a less believable and more dramatic blunt-force approach, rather than portray her [Sohee's] experience there as one that slowly comes to affect her mind and priorities until her warped sense of priorities and self-worth leads her to end her life." Lazic, giving the film a C, concluded by stating, "The film's attempt at evoking both Sohee and Oh Yoo-jin's shared humanity feels rather trite, and its overall emotional landscape and its study of exploitation, both are stuck in a rather monotonous sense of indignation and tragedy that ultimately feels frustratingly unproductive". French critics site Le Bleu du Miroir praised the performances of actors and screenplay writing, "Magnificently carried by its two actresses, neat in its writing and in its staging without fuss but always at the service of the story and its characters, Next Sohee asserts itself as an excellent closing choice for Critics' Week and confirms the promises of a filmmaker to follow." Panos Kotzathanasis reviewing the film for HanCinema rated it with 7.5/10 and praised the editing writing, "editing results in a slow pace that suits the aesthetics of the movie to perfection". He also appreciated cinematography opining, "cinematography captures the bleakness of the lives of the protagonists through mostly saturated colors and mid-shots". Concluding Kotzathanasis wrote, "Next Sohee is an excellent drama that highlights the issues with the Korean system and their consequences in the most pointed but also rewarding way."

== Accolades ==
Name of the award ceremony, year presented, category, nominee of the award, and the result of the nomination
Award ceremony	Year	Category	Nominee	Result	Ref.
Fantasia International Film Festival	2022	Cheval Noir Award for Best director	Jung Ju-ri	Won	
Fantasia International Film Festival	2022	Best Asian Feature silver award (Audience Award category)	Next Sohee	Won	
Tokyo Filmex	2022	Special Jury Award	Next Sohee	Won	
42nd France Amiens International Film Festival	2022	Audience Award	Next Sohee	Won	
42nd France Amiens International Film Festival	2022	Special Mention Award & UPJV Reference Award	Next Sohee	Won	
42nd France Amiens International Film Festival	2022	UPJV Reference Award	Next Sohee	Won	
6th Pingyao International Film Festival	2023	Roberto Rossellini Best Film Award	Next Sohee	Won	
Baeksang Arts Awards	2023	Best New Actress – Film	Kim Si-eun	Won	
Baeksang Arts Awards	2023	Best Screenplay – Film	Jung Joo-ri	Won	
Baeksang Arts Awards	2023	Best Director – Film	Jung Joo-ri	Nominated	
Baeksang Arts Awards	2023	Gucci Impact Award	Next Sohee	Won	
Baeksang Arts Awards	2023	Best Film	Next Sohee	Nominated	
Baeksang Arts Awards	2023	Best Actress – Film	Bae Doona	Nominated	
Bechdel Day	2023	Bechdel Choice 10 — Film	Next Sohee	Top 10	
Bechdel Day	2023	Bechdelian in film — Producer of the Year	Jung Ju-ri	Won	
Buil Film Awards	2023	Best Film	Next Sohee	Nominated	
Buil Film Awards	2023	Best Director	Jung Joo-ri	Won	
Buil Film Awards	2023	Best Actress	Bae Doona	Nominated	
Buil Film Awards	2023	Best New Actress	Kim Si-eun	Won	
Buil Film Awards	2023	Best Screenplay	Jung Joo-ri	Nominated	
Buil Film Awards	2023	Yu Hyun-mok Film Arts Award	Bae Doona	Won	
Korean Association of Film Critics Awards	2023	Best film	Next Sohee	Won	
Korean Association of Film Critics Awards	2023	Best New Actress	Kim Si-eun	Won	
Grand Bell Awards	2023	Best Film	Next Sohee	Nominated	
Grand Bell Awards	2023	Best Director	Jung Ju-ri	Nominated	
Grand Bell Awards	2023	Best Actress	Bae Doona	Nominated	
Grand Bell Awards	2023	Best Screenplay	Jung Joo-ri	Nominated	
Grand Bell Awards	2023	Best New Actress	Kim Si-eun	Won	
Blue Dragon Film Awards	2023	Best Film	Next Sohee	Nominated	
Blue Dragon Film Awards	2023	Best Director	Jung Ju-ri	Nominated	
Blue Dragon Film Awards	2023	Best New Actress	Kim Si-eun	Nominated	
Blue Dragon Film Awards	2023	Best Screenplay	Jung Joo-ri	Won	
Chunsa Film Art Awards	2023	Un Certain Regard Director Award	Jung Ju-ri	Won	
Chunsa Film Art Awards	2023	Best New Actress	Kim Si-eun	Nominated	
10th Korean Film Producers Association Awards	2023	Best Picture award	Next Sohee	Won	
