= The Night Owl (2022 film) =

- Theatrical release poster
- Hangul: 올빼미
- RR: Olppaemi
- MR: Olppaemi
- Directed by: Ahn Tae-jin
- Written by: Hyun Gyu-ri; Ahn Tae-jin
- Produced by: Baek Chang-ju; Baek Youn-ja
- Starring: Ryu Jun-yeol; Yoo Hae-jin
- Cinematography: Kim Tae-kyeong
- Edited by: Kim Sun-min
- Music by: Hwang Sang-jun
- Production companies: C-JeS Entertainment; Cinema DahmDahm
- Distributed by: Next Entertainment World
- Release date: 23 November 2022
- Running time: 118 minutes
- Country: South Korea
- Language: Korean
- Budget: ₩9 billion
- Box office: US$26.6 million

The Night Owl (Korean: 올빼미; RR: Olppaemi; lit. Owl) is a 2022 South Korean historical thriller film directed by Ahn Tae-jin in his feature directional debut, and starring Ryu Jun-yeol and Yoo Hae-jin. Set during the reign of King Injo in the Joseon era, it is based on the mystery surrounding the death of Crown Prince Sohyeon, who returned from the Qing Dynasty. It was released on November 23, 2022.

== Plot ==
Kyung-soo is blind due to hemeralopia, leaving him effectively sightless during the day, though his vision returns at night. Despite this, he is an exceptionally skilled acupuncturist. He enters the palace after being recognized for his talent by Lee Hyung-ik. Around that time, Crown Prince Sohyeon returns to Joseon after eight years as a hostage of the Qing Dynasty. King Injo, while happy for his son, is overcome with unknown anxiety for a while.

One night, Kyung-soo's nighttime vision allows him to witness the crown prince's mysterious death. As he tries to tell the truth, bigger secrets and conspiracies are revealed, putting his life at risk. After the death of his son, Injo's anxiety turns into madness and begins to run rampant. Kyung-soo, who witnessed the death of the crown prince, attempts to reveal the truth behind the crown prince's death.

== Cast ==
- Ryu Jun-yeol as Kyung-soo
- Yoo Hae-jin as King Injo
- Choi Moo-sung as Lee Hyung-ik
- Jo Sung-ha as Young Eui-jeong
- Park Myung-hoon as Man-sik
- Kim Sung-cheol as Crown Prince Sohyeon
- Ahn Eun-jin as Jo So-yong
- Jo Yun-seo as Crown Princess Minhoe
- Lee Joo-won as Yi Seok-cheol, the eldest son of Crown Prince Sohyeon
- Kim Do-won as Chun Kyung-jae, Kyung-soo's younger brother.

== Reception ==
=== Box office ===
As of 16 January 2023, it is the fifth highest-grossing Korean film of 2022, with a gross of US$26,395,809, and 3,317,510 admissions. On December 23, 2022, The Night Owl surpassed 3 million cumulative audiences on this afternoon. An additional 900,000 people were mobilized in two weeks after exceeding the break-even point of 2.1 million on the 8th, which led the box office for three consecutive weeks.

The film was in competition at FFCP 2023, the festival dedicated to Korean film in Paris.

== Accolades ==
Award ceremony	Year	Category	Recipient(s)	Result	Ref.
Baeksang Arts Awards	2023	Best Film	The Night Owl	Won	
Baeksang Arts Awards	2023	Best Director	Ahn Tae-jin	Nominated	
Baeksang Arts Awards	2023	Best New Director	Ahn Tae-jin	Won	
Baeksang Arts Awards	2023	Best Actor	Ryu Jun-yeol	Won	
Baeksang Arts Awards	2023	Best Supporting Actor	Kim Sung-cheol	Nominated	
Baeksang Arts Awards	2023	Best Supporting Actress	Ahn Eun-jin	Nominated	
Baeksang Arts Awards	2023	Best Screenplay	Ahn Tae-jin and Hyun Kyu-ri	Nominated	
Baeksang Arts Awards	2023	Best Technical Award (Lighting)	Hong Seung-cheol	Nominated	
Director's Cut Awards	2023	Best New Director in film	Ahn Tae-jin	Won	
Director's Cut Awards	2023	Best Director in film	Ahn Tae-jin	Nominated	
Director's Cut Awards	2023	Best Screenplay	Ahn Tae-jin and Hyun Kyu-ri	Nominated	
Director's Cut Awards	2023	Best Actor in film	Ryu Jun-yeol	Nominated	
Director's Cut Awards	2023	Best Actor in film	Yoo Hae-jin	Nominated	
Director's Cut Awards	2023	Best New Actor in film	Kim Sung-cheol	Nominated	
Director's Cut Awards	2023	Best New Actress in film	Ahn Eun-jin	Nominated	
Korean Association of Film Critics Awards	2023	Best Actor	Ryu Jun-yeol	Won	
Korean Association of Film Critics Awards	2023	Best New Director	Ahn Tae-jin	Won	
Korean Association of Film Critics Awards	2023	Cinematography Award	Kim Tae-kyeong	Won	
Buil Film Awards	2023	Best Actor	Ryu Jun-yeol	Nominated	
Buil Film Awards	2023	Best Actor	Yoo Hae-jin	Nominated	
Buil Film Awards	2023	Best New Director	Ahn Tae-jin	Nominated	
Buil Film Awards	2023	Best Screenplay	Ahn Tae-jin and Hyun Kyu-ri	Nominated	
Buil Film Awards	2023	Best New Actress	Ahn Eun-jin	Nominated	
Buil Film Awards	2023	Best Film	The Night Owl	Nominated	
Golden Cinema Film Festival	2023	Best Actor	Ryu Jun-yeol	Won	
Golden Cinema Film Festival	2023	Best Supporting Actor	Choi Moo-sung	Won	
Golden Cinema Film Festival	2023	Best Director	Ahn Tae-jin	Won	
Golden Cinema Film Festival	2023	Best Cinematography	Kim Tae-kyeong	Won	
Golden Cinema Film Festival	2023	Best lighting	Hong Seung-chul	Won	
Grand Bell Awards	2023	Best Film	The Night Owl	Nominated	
Grand Bell Awards	2023	Best Actor	Ryu Jun-yeol	Nominated	
Grand Bell Awards	2023	Best New Actress	Ahn Eun-jin	Nominated	
Grand Bell Awards	2023	Best New Actor	Kim Sung-cheol	Nominated	
Grand Bell Awards	2023	Best New Director	Ahn Tae-jin	Won	
Grand Bell Awards	2023	Best Screenplay	Ahn Tae-jin and Hyun Kyu-ri	Won	
Grand Bell Awards	2023	Best Cinematography	Kim Tae-kyeong	Nominated	
Grand Bell Awards	2023	Best Sound	Park Yong-ki	Nominated	
Grand Bell Awards	2023	Best Costume Design	Shim Hyun-seop	Nominated	
Grand Bell Awards	2023	Best Editing	Kim Sun-min	Won	
Blue Dragon Film Awards	2023	Best Film	The Night Owl	Nominated	
Blue Dragon Film Awards	2023	Best Actor	Ryu Jun-yeol	Nominated	
Blue Dragon Film Awards	2023	Best New Actress	Ahn Eun-jin	Nominated	
Blue Dragon Film Awards	2023	Best New Director	Ahn Tae-jin	Won	
Blue Dragon Film Awards	2023	Best Screenplay	Hyun Eun-mi, Ahn Tae-jin	Nominated	
Blue Dragon Film Awards	2023	Best Cinematography and lighting	Kim Tae-kyeong, Hong Seung-chul	Won	
Blue Dragon Film Awards	2023	Best Technical award (Sound)	Park Yong-ki	Nominated	
Blue Dragon Film Awards	2023	Best Art Direction	Lee Ha-jun	Nominated	
Blue Dragon Film Awards	2023	Best Editing	Kim Sun-min	Won	
