= 59th Baeksang Arts Awards =

2023 edition of award ceremony

- Promotional poster
- Date: April 28, 2023
- Site: Incheon Paradise City, Incheon
- Hosted by: Shin Dong-yup; Bae Suzy; Park Bo-gum
- Organised by: JoongAng Group

Highlights
- Most awards: Film: Decision to Leave (3); The Night Owl (3); Television: The Glory (3)
- Most nominations: Film: The Night Owl (8); Television: Extraordinary Attorney Woo (10)
- Grand Prize – Film: Decision to Leave
- Grand Prize – TV: Park Eun-bin (actress) – Extraordinary Attorney Woo
- Website: Baeksang Arts Awards

Television/radio coverage
- Network: JTBC; TikTok (international)
- Viewership: 2.572% (Nielsen Korea)

The 59th Baeksang Arts Awards (Korean: 제59회 백상예술대상) ceremony, organised by JoongAng Group, was held at Incheon Paradise City, Incheon on April 28, 2023, at 17:30 KST. The event was hosted by Shin Dong-yup, Bae Suzy, and Park Bo-gum and was broadcast live in South Korea by JTBC and internationally by TikTok. The annual awards ceremony is one of South Korea's most prestigious award shows, recognizing excellence in film, television, and theatre, through strict screening conducted by 60 professional evaluators, judges in the industry, and a group of experts representing TV, film, and theater through a fierce screening process.

The nominees were announced on April 7, 2023, via its official website. All works released between April 1, 2022, to March 31, 2023, were eligible for nominations. The final candidates for the Grand Prize – Film category were the movie Decision to Leave and its director, Park Chan-wook. For the Grand Prize – Television, the finalists included actress Park Eun-bin, the legal drama Extraordinary Attorney Woo, actor Lee Sung-min, screenwriter Kim Eun-sook, and the revenge series The Glory.

The night's highest honors, the Grand Prize (Daesang), were awarded to Decision to Leave in the film category and Park Eun-bin in the television category, respectively. Decision to Leave and The Night Owl were the most decorated films of the ceremony with three awards each, while The Glory was the most-awarded television series, also receiving three.

== Winners and nominees ==
- Winners are listed first and emphasized in **bold**.

=== Film ===
**Grand Prize**	**Best Film**
**Decision to Leave (film)**; Park Chan-wook (director) – Decision to Leave	**The Night Owl**; Next Sohee; Hansan: Rising Dragon; Hunt; Decision to Leave
**Best Director**	**Best New Director**
**Park Chan-wook – Decision to Leave**; Kim Han-min – Hansan: Rising Dragon; Ahn Tae-jin – The Night Owl; Lee Jung-jae – Hunt; Jung Ju-ri – Next Sohee	**Ahn Tae-jin – The Night Owl**; Kim Se-in – The Apartment with Two Women; Park Yi-woong – The Girl on a Bulldozer; Lee Sang-yong – The Roundup; Lee Jung-jae – Hunt
**Best Actor**	**Best Actress**
**Ryu Jun-yeol – The Night Owl as Cheon Kyung-soo**; Ma Dong-seok – The Roundup as Ma Seok-do; Park Hae-il – Decision to Leave as Jang Hae-joon; Song Kang-ho – Broker as Ha Sang-hyun; Jung Woo-sung – Hunt as Kim Jung-do	**Tang Wei – Decision to Leave as Song Seo-rae**; Bae Doona – Next Sohee as Yoo-jin; Yang Mal-bok – The Apartment with Two Women as Su-gyeong; Yum Jung-ah – Life Is Beautiful as Oh Se-yeon; Jeon Do-yeon – Kill Boksoon as Gil Bok-soon
**Best Supporting Actor**	**Best Supporting Actress**
**Byun Yo-han – Hansan: Rising Dragon as Wakisaka**; Kang Ki-young – The Point Men as Qasim / Lee Bong-han; Kim Sung-cheol – The Night Owl as Crown Prince Sohyeon; Park Ji-hwan – The Roundup as Jang I-soo; Yim Si-wan – Emergency Declaration as Jin-seok	**Park Se-wan – 6/45 as Yeon-hee**; Bae Doona – Broker as Soo-jin; Ahn Eun-jin – The Night Owl as Jo So-yong; Yum Jung-ah – Alienoid as Heug-seoul; Lee Yeon – Kill Boksoon as Kim Yeong-ji
**Best New Actor**	**Best New Actress**
**Park Jin-young – Christmas Carol as Joo Il-woo / Joo Wol-woo**; Roh Jae-won – Missing Yoon as Jung Joon-ok; Byeon Woo-seok – 20th Century Girl as Poong Woon-ho; Seo In-guk – Project Wolf Hunting as Park Jong-doo; Ong Seong-wu – Life Is Beautiful as Jeong-woo	**Kim Si-eun – Next Sohee as So-hee**; Go Youn-jung – Hunt as Jo Yoo-jeong; Kim Hye-yoon – The Girl on a Bulldozer as Goo Hye-young; Lee Ji-eun – Broker as Moon So-young; Ha Yoon-kyung – Gyeong-ah’s Daughter as Yeon-su
**Best Screenplay**	**Best Technical Achievement**
**Jung Joo-ri – Next Sohee**; Park Gyu-tae – 6/45; Lee Jung-jae, Jo Seung-hee – Hunt; Park Chan-wook, Jeong Seo-kyeong – Decision to Leave; Ahn Tae-jin, Hyun Kyu-ri – The Night Owl	**Lee Mo-gae (Cinematography) – Hunt**; Ryu Seong-hui (Art direction) – Decision to Leave; Jeong Seong-jin, Jeong Chul-min (VFX) – Hansan: Rising Dragon; Cho Young-wook (Music) – Decision to Leave; Hong Seung-cheol (Lighting) – The Night Owl

==== Films with multiple nominations ====
The following films received multiple nominations:

Nominations	Films
8	The Night Owl
7	Decision to Leave
7	Hunt
5	Next Sohee
4	Hansan: Rising Dragon
3	Broker
3	The Roundup
2	6/45
2	Kill Boksoon
2	Life Is Beautiful
2	The Apartment with Two Women
2	The Girl on a Bulldozer

==== Films with multiple awards ====
The following films received multiple awards:

Wins	Films
3	Decision to Leave
3	The Night Owl
2	Next Sohee

=== Television ===
**Grand Prize**
**Park Eun-bin (actress) – Extraordinary Attorney Woo as Woo Young-woo**; Extraordinary Attorney Woo (drama) (ENA); Lee Sung-min (actor) – Reborn Rich as Jin Yang-chul; Kim Eun-sook (screenwriter) – The Glory; The Glory (drama) (Netflix)
**Best Drama**	**Best Director**
**The Glory (Netflix)**; My Liberation Notes (JTBC); Our Blues (tvN); Extraordinary Attorney Woo (ENA); Little Women (tvN)	**Yoo In-shik – Extraordinary Attorney Woo**; Kim Kyu-tae – Our Blues; Kim Seok-yoon – My Liberation Notes; Kim Hee-won – Little Women; Lee Joo-young – Anna
**Best Entertainment Program**	**Best Educational Show**
**Psick Show Season 3 (YouTube)**; Earth Arcade (tvN); Physical: 100 (Netflix); EXchange Season 2 (TVING); SNL Korea 3 (Coupang Play)	**Adult Kim Jang-ha (MBC Gyeongnam)**; National Investigation Headquarters (Wavve); In the Name of God: A Holy Betrayal (Netflix); Your Literacy Skills+ (EBS); Hidden Earth: 3 Billion Years on the Korean Peninsula (KBS)
**Best Actor**	**Best Actress**
**Lee Sung-min – Reborn Rich as Jin Yang-chul**; Son Suk-ku – My Liberation Notes as Gu Ja-gyeong; Lee Byung-hun – Our Blues as Lee Dong-seok; Jung Kyung-ho – Crash Course in Romance as Choi Chi-yeol; Choi Min-sik – Big Bet as Cha Mu-sik	**Song Hye-kyo – The Glory as Moon Dong-eun**; Kim Ji-won – My Liberation Notes as Yeom Mi-jeong; Kim Hye-soo – Under the Queen's Umbrella as Queen Im Hwa-ryeong; Park Eun-bin – Extraordinary Attorney Woo as Woo Young-woo; Bae Suzy – Anna as Lee Yumi / Lee Anna
**Best Supporting Actor**	**Best Supporting Actress**
**Jo Woo-jin – Narco-Saints as Byeon Ki-tae**; Kang Ki-young – Extraordinary Attorney Woo as Jung Myung-seok; Kim Do-hyun – Reborn Rich as Choi Chang-je; Kim Jun-han – Anna as Choi Ji-hoon; Park Sung-hoon – The Glory as Jeon Jae-joon	**Lim Ji-yeon – The Glory as Park Yeon-jin**; Kim Shin-rok – Reborn Rich as Jin Hwa-young; Yeom Hye-ran – The Glory as Kang Hyeon-nam; Lee El – My Liberation Notes as Yeom Ki-jeong; Jung Eun-chae – Anna as Lee Hyeon-ju
**Best New Actor**	**Best New Actress**
**Moon Sang-min – Under the Queen's Umbrella as Grand Prince Seongnam / Yi Kang**; Kim Gun-woo – The Glory as Son Myeong-oh; Kim Min-ho – New Recruit as Park Min-seok; Joo Jong-hyuk – Extraordinary Attorney Woo as Kwon Min-woo; Hong Kyung – Weak Hero Class 1 as Oh Beom-seok	**Roh Yoon-seo – Crash Course in Romance as Nam Hae-yi**; Kim Hieora – The Glory as Lee Sa-ra; Lee Kyung-seong – My Liberation Notes as Kwak Hye-suk; Joo Hyun-young – Extraordinary Attorney Woo as Dong Geu-ra-mi; Ha Yoon-kyung – Extraordinary Attorney Woo as Choi Su-yeon
**Best Male Variety Performer**	**Best Female Variety Performer**
**Kim Jong-kook**; Kian84; Kim Kyung-wook; Jun Hyun-moo; Hwang Je-sung	**Lee Eun-ji**; Kim Min-kyung; Park Se-mi; Lee Soo-ji; Joo Hyun-young
**Best Screenplay**	**Best Technical Achievement**
**Park Hae-young – My Liberation Notes**; Kim Eun-sook – The Glory; Moon Ji-won – Extraordinary Attorney Woo; Jeong Seo-kyung – Little Women; Hong Jung-eun, Hong Mi-ran – Alchemy of Souls	**Ryu Seong-hui (Art direction) – Little Women**; Noh Young-sim (Music) – Extraordinary Attorney Woo; Song Nak-hoon, Jo Jin-hyeon, Hwang In-woo (Cinematography) – Inkigayo; Hwang Jin-hye (Visual Effects) – Extraordinary Attorney Woo; Jang Jong-kyung (Cinematography) – The Glory

==== Television programs with multiple nominations ====
The following television programs received multiple nominations:

Nominations	Television programs
10	Extraordinary Attorney Woo
9	The Glory
7	My Liberation Notes
4	Anna
4	Little Women
3	Our Blues
3	Reborn Rich
2	Crash Course in Romance
2	Under the Queen's Umbrella

==== Television programs with multiple awards ====
The following television programs received multiple awards:

Wins	Television programs
3	The Glory
2	Extraordinary Attorney Woo

=== Theater ===
**Baeksang Theater**
**None Elected – Doosan Art Center**; Jeong Hee-jung – Rabbit Hole Theater; Teenage Dick – National Theater; DRAG x Namjangsinsa [Drag by Namjangsinsa] – Drag King Contest
**Best Acting**	**Best Newcomer**
**Ha Ji-seong – Teenage Dick**; Kwon Eun-hye – DRAG x Namjangsinsa [Drag by Namjangsinsa]; Choi Ho-young – Transfers; Choi Hee-jin – Nosce; Ha Ji-eun – The Welkin	**Now Archive (theater) – A Little Lonely Monologue and Always Friendly Songs**; Bae Hae-ryul (writer) – Once Upon a Time, There Was an Asian Small-Clawed Otter Living in Seoul City; Jang Han-sae (director) – The World is Ending Like This, Without a Bang, With Sobs; Jin Ju (writer) – Class; Han A-reum (director and writer) – Plastic Paradise

=== Special awards ===
The voting for the TikTok Popularity Award was held from 11:00 KST on April 18 to 16:00 KST on April 26 via TikTok.

Awards	Recipient
**TikTok Popularity Award – Male**	Park Jin-young
**TikTok Popularity Award – Female**	Lee Ji-eun
**Gucci Impact Award**	Next Sohee

== Presenters and performers ==
The following individuals and teams, listed in order of appearance, presented awards or performed musical numbers.

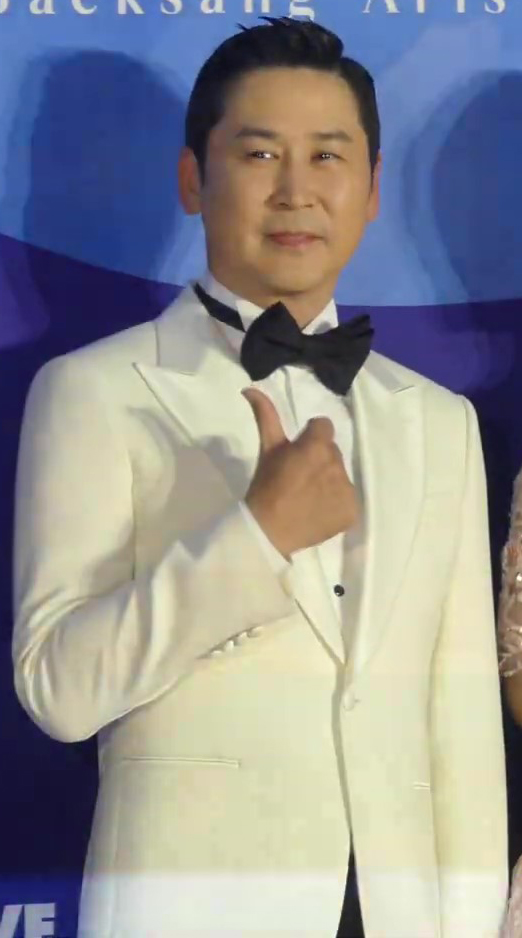
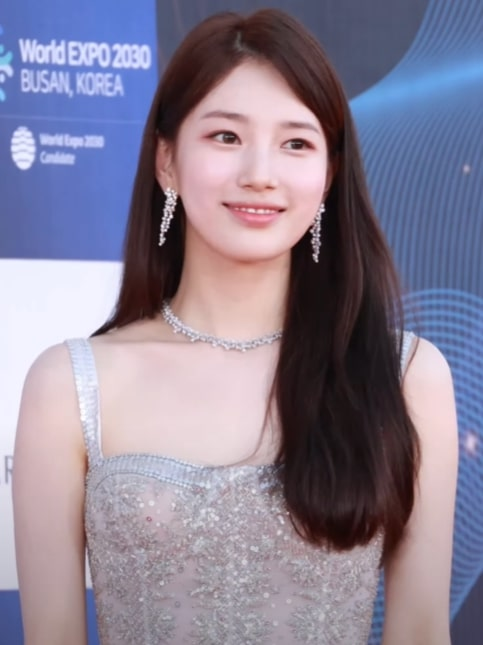
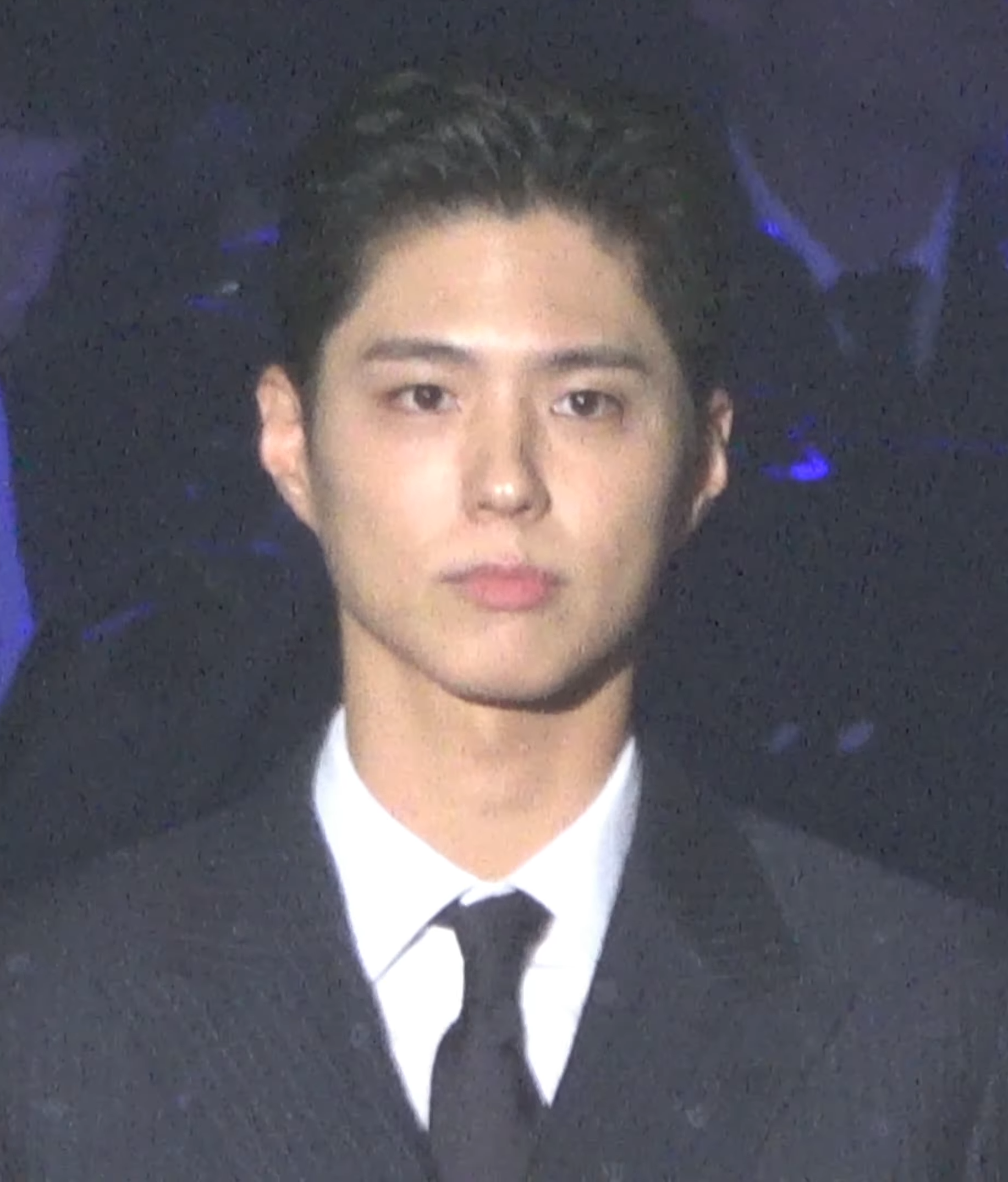
Hosts Shin Dong-yup, Bae Suzy, and Park Bo-gum

=== Presenters ===
Presenter(s)	Award(s)	Ref.
Koo Kyo-hwan and Kim Hye-jun	Best New Actor – Television, Best New Actress – Television and Best Newcomer – Theater	
Lee Hong-nae and Lee Yoo-mi	Best New Actor – Film, Best New Actress – Film and Best New Director – Film	
Kim Byung-chul and Lee Moo-saeng	Best Technical Achievement – Television, Best Technical Achievement – Film, Best Screenplay – Television and Best Screenplay – Film	
Cho Hyun-chul and Kim Shin-rok	Best Supporting Actor – Television and Best Supporting Actress – Television	
Jo Woo-jin and Lee Soo-kyung	Best Supporting Actor – Film and Best Supporting Actress – Film	
Kim Shin-rok and Kim Sun-ah	Gucci Impact Award	
Lee Yong-jin and Joo Hyun-young	Best Entertainment Program, Best Male Variety Performer and Best Female Variety Performer	
Lee Je-hoon and Greg Hsu	Best Director – Television and Best Director – Film	
Yoon Hyun-min and Yoo In-na	TikTok Popularity Award for Most Popular Actor and Most Popular Actress	
Park Wan-gyu and Hwang Sun-mi	Best Acting – Theater	
Sul Kyung-gu and Lee Hye-young	Best Actor – Film and Best Actress – Film	
Park Shin-hye and Park Hyung-sik	Best Educational Show, Best Film and Best Drama	
Park Ji-ah	Baeksang Theater	
Lee Jun-ho and Kim Tae-ri	Best Actor – Television and Best Actress – Television	
Ryoo Seung-wan	Grand Prize – Film	
Uhm Jung-hwa and Jeongdo Hong	Grand Prize – Television	

=== Performers ===
Name(s)	Performed	Ref.
Park Jin-young, Kim Si-eun, Oh Ji-yul, Lim Ji-ho, Kang Hyun-oh and Kim Jung-young	"A Throwing Stone"	

== See also ==
- 59th Grand Bell Awards
- 32nd Buil Film Awards
- Chunsa Film Art Awards 2023
