= Baeksang Arts Award for Best Film =

South Korean film award

- Awarded for: Best South Korean film of the year
- Country: South Korea
- Presented by: Baeksang Arts Awards
- Most recent winner: No Other Choice (2026)
- Website: baeksangartsawards

The Baeksang Arts Award for Best Film (Korean: 백상예술대상 영화부문 작품상; RR: Baeksang Yesul Daesang Yeonghwa Bumun Jakpumsang) is an award presented annually at the Baeksang Arts Awards ceremony organised by Ilgan Sports and JTBC Plus, affiliates of JoongAng Ilbo, usually in the second quarter of each year in Seoul.

== Winners and nominees ==
Table key
‡	Indicates the winner

=== 1960s ===
Year	Film	Original title	Director
1965 (1st)	Deaf Sam-yong ‡	벙어리 삼룡	Shin Sang-ok
1966 (2nd)	The Sea Village ‡	갯마을	Kim Soo-yong
1967 (3rd)	Late Autumn ‡	만추	Lee Man-hee
1968 (4th)	Children of the Firing Range ‡	사격장의 아이들	Lee Man-hee
1969 (5th)	The General's Mustache ‡	장군의 수염	Lee Sung-gu

=== 1970s ===
Year	Film	Original title	Director
1970 (6th)	Spring, Spring ‡	봄, 봄	
1971 (7th)	Frozen Spring ‡	동춘	Jung Jin-woo
1972 (8th)	War and Humanity ‡	전쟁과 인간	Shin Sang-ok
1973 (9th)	Gate of Women ‡	홍살문	Byun Jang-ho
1974 (10th)	Special Investigation Unit: The Case of Bae Tae-ok ‡	배태옥 사건	Lee Won-se
1975 (11th)	The Executioner ‡	망나니	Byun Jang-ho
1976 (12th)	A Byegone Romance ‡	왕십리	Im Kwon-taek
1977 (13th)	Concentration of Attention ‡	집념	Choi In-hyeon
1978 (14th)	A Splendid Outing ‡	화려한 외출	Kim Soo-yong
1979 (15th)	The Last Words from a Comrade in Arms ‡	전우가 남긴 한마디	Lee Won-se

=== 1980s ===
Year	Film	Original title	Director
1980 (16th)	Man-suk, Run! ‡	달려라 만석아	Kim Soo-yong
1981 (17th)	A Fine, Windy Day ‡	바람 불어 좋은 날	Lee Jang-ho
1982 (18th)	Come Unto Down ‡	낮은 데로 임하소서	Lee Jang-ho
1983 (19th)	Village in the Mist ‡	안개마을	Im Kwon-taek
1984 (20th)	Whale Hunting ‡	고래사냥	Bae Chang-ho
1985 (21st)	Deep Blue Night ‡	깊고 푸른 밤	Bae Chang-ho
1986 (22nd)	Gilsoddeum ‡	길소뜸	Im Kwon-taek
1987 (23rd)	Moonlight Hunter ‡	달빛 사냥꾼	Shin Seung-soo
1988 (24th)	Adada ‡	아다다	Im Kwon-taek
1989 (25th)	Seoul Rainbow ‡	서울 무지개	Kim Ho-sun

=== 1990s ===
Year	Film	Original title	Director
1990 (26th)	The Lovers of Woomook-baemi ‡	우묵배미의 사랑	Jang Sun-woo
1991 (27th)	Silver Stallion ‡	은마는 오지 않는다	Jang Kil-su
1992 (28th)	Stairways of Heaven ‡	천국의 계단	Bae Chang-ho
1993 (29th)	Our Twisted Hero ‡	우리들의 일그러진 영웅	Park Jong-won
1994 (30th)	Two Cops ‡	투캅스	Kang Woo-suk
1994 (30th)	Seopyeonje ‡	서편제	Im Kwon-taek
1995 (31st)	Life and Death of the Hollywood Kid ‡	헐리우드 키드의 생애	Chung Ji-young
1996 (32nd)	Farewell My Darling ‡	학생부군신위	Park Chul-soo
1997 (33rd)	Green Fish ‡	초록 물고기	Lee Chang-dong
1998 (34th)	Christmas in August ‡	8월의 크리스마스	Hur Jin-ho
1999 (35th)	Shiri ‡	쉬리	Kang Je-gyu

=== 2000s ===
Year	Film	Original title	Director
2000 (36th)	The Spy ‡	간첩 리철진	Jang Jin
2001 (37th)	Libera Me ‡	리베라 메	Yang Yun-ho
2002 (38th)	Waikiki Brothers ‡	와이키키 브라더스	Yim Soon-rye
2003 (39th)	Oasis ‡	오아시스	Lee Chang-dong
2004 (40th)	Taegukgi: The Brotherhood of War ‡	태극기 휘날리며	Kang Je-gyu
2005 (41st)	The President's Last Bang ‡	그때 그사람들	Im Sang-soo
2005 (41st)	3-Iron	빈집	Kim Ki-duk
2005 (41st)	Marathon	말아톤	Jeong Yoon-cheol
2006 (42nd)	Blood Rain ‡	혈의 누	Kim Dae-seung
2006 (42nd)	Blossom Again	사랑니	Jung Ji-woo
2006 (42nd)	Duelist	형사	Lee Myung-se
2006 (42nd)	The King and the Clown	왕의 남자	Lee Joon-ik
2006 (42nd)	Lady Vengeance	친절한 금자씨	Park Chan-wook
2007 (43rd)	The Host ‡	괴물	Bong Joon-ho
2007 (43rd)	I'm a Cyborg, But That's OK	싸이보그지만 괜찮아	Park Chan-wook
2007 (43rd)	Midnight Ballad for Ghost Theater	삼거리 극장	Jeon Kye-soo
2007 (43rd)	Radio Star	라디오 스타	Lee Joon-ik
2007 (43rd)	Tazza: The High Rollers	타짜	Choi Dong-hoon
2008 (44th)	Forever the Moment ‡	우리 생애 최고의 순간	Yim Soon-rye
2008 (44th)	The Chaser	추격자	Na Hong-jin
2008 (44th)	Happiness	행복	Hur Jin-ho
2008 (44th)	May 18	화려한 휴가	Kim Ji-hoon
2008 (44th)	Secret Sunshine	밀양	Lee Chang-dong
2009 (45th)	Viva! Love ‡	경축! 우리 사랑	Oh Jeom-gyoon
2009 (45th)	A Frozen Flower	쌍화점	Yoo Ha
2009 (45th)	The Good, the Bad, the Weird	좋은 놈, 나쁜 놈, 이상한 놈	Kim Jee-woon
2009 (45th)	Rough Cut	영화는 영화다	Jang Hoon
2009 (45th)	Scandal Makers	과속스캔들	Kang Hyeong-cheol

=== 2010s ===
Year	Film	Original title	Director
2010 (46th)	Take Off ‡	국가대표	Kim Yong-hwa
2010 (46th)	Tidal Wave	해운대	Yoon Je-kyoon
2010 (46th)	Mother	마더	Bong Joon-ho
2010 (46th)	Secret Reunion	의형제	Jang Hoon
2010 (46th)	Thirst	박쥐	Park Chan-wook
2011 (47th)	The Man from Nowhere ‡	아저씨	Lee Jeong-beom
2011 (47th)	Moss	이끼	Kang Woo-suk
2011 (47th)	Poetry	시	Lee Chang-dong
2011 (47th)	The Unjust	부당거래	Ryoo Seung-wan
2011 (47th)	The Yellow Sea	황해	Na Hong-jin
2012 (48th)	Unbowed ‡	부러진 화살	Chung Ji-young
2012 (48th)	Helpless	화차	Byun Young-joo
2012 (48th)	Punch	완득이	Lee Han
2012 (48th)	Sunny	써니	Kang Hyeong-cheol
2012 (48th)	Nameless Gangster: Rules of the Time	범죄와의 전쟁	Yoon Jong-bin
2013 (49th)	Masquerade ‡	광해: 왕이 된 남자	Choo Chang-min
2013 (49th)	The Berlin File	베를린	Ryoo Seung-wan
2013 (49th)	Miracle in Cell No. 7	7번방의 선물	Lee Hwan-kyung
2013 (49th)	Pietà	피에타	Kim Ki-duk
2013 (49th)	A Werewolf Boy	늑대소년	Jo Sung-hee
2014 (50th)	The Attorney ‡	변호인	Yang Woo-suk
2014 (50th)	The Face Reader	관상	Han Jae-rim
2014 (50th)	Hope	소원	Lee Joon-ik
2014 (50th)	Snowpiercer	설국열차	Bong Joon-ho
2014 (50th)	The Terror Live	더 테러 라이브	Kim Byung-woo
2015 (51st)	Revivre ‡	화장	Im Kwon-taek
2015 (51st)	The Admiral: Roaring Currents	명량	Kim Han-min
2015 (51st)	A Girl at My Door	도희야	July Jung
2015 (51st)	Han Gong-ju	한공주	Lee Su-jin
2015 (51st)	A Hard Day	끝까지 간다	Kim Seong-hun
2016 (52nd)	Assassination ‡	암살	Choi Dong-hoon
2016 (52nd)	Dongju: The Portrait of a Poet	동주	Lee Joon-ik
2016 (52nd)	Fourth Place	4등	Jung Ji-woo
2016 (52nd)	Inside Men	내부자들	Woo Min-ho
2016 (52nd)	Veteran	베테랑	Ryoo Seung-wan
2017 (53rd)	The Wailing ‡	곡성	Na Hong-jin
2017 (53rd)	The Age of Shadows	밀정	Kim Jee-woon
2017 (53rd)	Train to Busan	부산행	Yeon Sang-ho
2017 (53rd)	The Handmaiden	아가씨	Park Chan-wook
2017 (53rd)	Asura: The City of Madness	아수라	Kim Sung-su
2018 (54th)	The Fortress ‡	남한산성	Hwang Dong-hyuk
2018 (54th)	1987: When the Day Comes	1987	Jang Joon-hwan
2018 (54th)	Anarchist from Colony	박열	Lee Joon-ik
2018 (54th)	Along with the Gods: The Two Worlds	신과함께: 죄와 벌	Kim Yong-hwa
2018 (54th)	A Taxi Driver	택시운전사	Jang Hoon
2019 (55th)	The Spy Gone North ‡	공작	Yoon Jong-bin
2019 (55th)	Miss Baek	미쓰백	Lee Ji-won
2019 (55th)	Burning	버닝	Lee Chang-dong
2019 (55th)	Svaha: The Sixth Finger	사바하	Jang Jae-hyun
2019 (55th)	Dark Figure of Crime	암수살인	Kim Tae-kyun

=== 2020s ===
Year	Film	Original title	Director
2020 (56th)	Parasite ‡	기생충	Bong Joon-ho
2020 (56th)	Exit	엑시트	Lee Sang-geun
2020 (56th)	House of Hummingbird	벌새	Kim Bora
2020 (56th)	Kim Ji-young: Born 1982	82년생 김지영	Kim Do-young
2020 (56th)	The Man Standing Next	남산의 부장들	Woo Min-ho
2021 (57th)	Samjin Company English Class ‡	삼진그룹 영어토익반	Lee Jong-pil
2021 (57th)	Moving On	남매의 여름밤	Yoon Dan-bi
2021 (57th)	Deliver Us from Evil	다만 악에서 구하소서	Hong Won-chan
2021 (57th)	Voice of Silence	소리도 없이	Hong Eui-jeong
2021 (57th)	The Book of Fish	자산어보	Lee Joon-ik
2022 (58th)	Escape from Mogadishu ‡	모가디슈	Ryoo Seung-wan
2022 (58th)	Kingmaker	킹메이커	Byun Sung-hyun
2022 (58th)	Miracle: Letters to the President	기적	Lee Jang-hoon
2022 (58th)	Sewing Sisters	미싱타는 여자들	Kim Jung-young; Lee Hyuk-rae
2022 (58th)	Romance Without Love	연애 빠진 로맨스	Jeong Ga-young
2023 (59th)	The Night Owl ‡	올빼미	Ahn Tae-jin
2023 (59th)	Next Sohee	다음 소희	Jung Ju-ri
2023 (59th)	Hansan: Rising Dragon	한산: 용의 출현	Kim Han-min
2023 (59th)	Hunt	헌트	Lee Jung-jae
2023 (59th)	Decision to Leave	헤어질 결심	Park Chan-wook
2024 (60th)	12.12: The Day ‡	서울의 봄	Kim Sung-su
2024 (60th)	Cobweb	거미집	Kim Jee-woon
2024 (60th)	Noryang: Deadly Sea	노량: 죽음의 바다	Kim Han-min
2024 (60th)	Concrete Utopia	콘크리트 유토피아	Um Tae-hwa
2024 (60th)	Exhuma	파묘	Jang Jae-hyun
2025 (61st)	Harbin ‡	하얼빈	Woo Min-ho
2025 (61st)	Love in the Big City	대도시의 사랑법	E.oni
2025 (61st)	Revolver	리볼버	Oh Seung-uk
2025 (61st)	House of the Seasons	장손	Oh Jung-min
2025 (61st)	Uprising	전,란	Kim Sang-man
2026 (62nd)	No Other Choice ‡	어쩔수가없다	Park Chan-wook
2026 (62nd)	The Final Semester	3학년 2학기	Lee Ran-hee
2026 (62nd)	Good News	굿뉴스	Byun Sung-hyun
2026 (62nd)	The World of Love	세계의 주인	Yoon Ga-eun
2026 (62nd)	The King's Warden	왕과 사는 남자	Jang Hang-jun

== Sources ==
- "Baeksang Arts Awards Nominees and Winners Lists". Naver Movie (in Korean).
- "Baeksang Arts Awards Winners Lists". Baeksang Arts Awards (in Korean).
