= A Girl at My Door =

2014 South Korean drama film

- Theatrical release poster
- Hangul: 도희야
- RR: Dohuiya
- MR: Tohŭiya
- Directed by: July Jung
- Written by: July Jung
- Produced by: Lee Chang-dong; Lee Joon-dong; Kim Ji Yeon
- Starring: Bae Doona; Kim Sae-ron; Song Sae-byeok
- Cinematography: Kim Hyun-seok
- Edited by: Lee Young-lim
- Music by: Jang Young-gyu; Han Hee-jung
- Distributed by: CGV Movie Collage; CJ Entertainment
- Release dates: 19 May 2014 (Cannes); 22 May 2014 (South Korea)
- Running time: 119 minutes
- Country: South Korea
- Language: Korean
- Budget: US$300,000
- Box office: US$569,809

A Girl at My Door (Korean: 도희야; lit. 'Do-hee') is a 2014 South Korean drama film directed by July Jung and stars Bae Doona as a policewoman who takes in an abused girl played by Kim Sae-ron. The film screened in the Un Certain Regard section at the 2014 Cannes Film Festival.

Due to the film's portrayal of a lesbian relationship, and the contentiousness of LGBT rights in South Korea, as well as the initial ambiguous relationship of the two main characters, the film had to be financed largely by the Korean Film Council. Because of this, the budget was limited to US$300,000; Bae and Kim agreed to not be paid.

== Plot ==
Following a personal scandal involving homosexuality, police academy instructor Lee Yeong-nam is transferred from Seoul to take over as chief of the police substation in a quiet seaside town in Yeosu. Yeong-nam keeps a low profile and tolerates the drunken excesses of the locals, but drinks heavily at home, decanting soju into water bottles.

Yeong-nam meets Seon Do-hee, a timid and withdrawn 14-year-old girl covered with cuts and bruises. Do-hee is bullied by classmates and beaten by both her drunk stepfather Yong-ha and drunk grandmother; her biological mother abandoned them. The locals keep quiet about Yong-ha's vices as he is the town's main employer, an oyster farmer.

After the body of Yong-ha's mother is found floating in the water and ruled an accidental death caused by drunk driving, Yong-ha attacks Do-hee again. Concerned for Do-hee's safety, Yeong-nam offers to let her stay with her during summer vacation, despite scrutiny from the villagers. For the first time, Do-hee has someone who doesn't hit her and calls her by her name instead of swearing at her. Do-hee bathes with and imitates Yeong-nam, wearing her uniform and cutting her hair in the same style.

Yeong-nam is tracked to Yeosu by her ex-girlfriend, who asks her to move to Australia with her. They argue and kiss, something Yong-ha sees. When Yeong-nam discovers that he uses undocumented foreign workers for cheap wages, Yong-ha tells the police that Yeong-nam sexually abused Do-hee. Young-nam is taken into custody. She insists that she had no improper contact with Do-hee and that taking in an abused child was her duty; the investigator responds that this was inappropriate behavior for a gay woman. Yeong-nam is sent to prison after Do-hee says she sexually abused her. Do-hee is returned to the care of her father and given a number to call if he beats her again.

At her family home, Do-hee undresses, dials the number and hides the phone, then caresses her sleeping father. He wakes and begins shouting at her. She cries in protest, telling him "it hurts." Police break in and arrest him. Do-hee confesses that her father told her to lie that Yeong-nam abused her. Yeong-nam is released and receives an apology. She visits Do-hee and asks her if she made what happened to her father and grandmother happen on purpose, then leaves. As she is being driven out of town, she tells the officer to stop the car. She finds Do-hee and asks that she come with her.

== Cast ==
- Bae Doona as Lee Young-nam, a chief of police substation
- Kim Sae-ron as Sun Do-hee, Yong-ha's adopted daughter
- Song Sae-byeok as Park Yong-ha
- Kim Jin-gu as Park Jum-soon, Yong-ha's mother
- Son Jong-hak as Captain Eom
- Na Jong-min as Officer Kim
- Gong Myung as Police Officer Kwon Son-oh
- Jang Hee-jin as Eun-jung, Young-nam's ex-lover
- Kim Min-jae as Jun-ho, Young-nam's senior colleague
- Park Jin-woo as Chief detective
- Moon Sung-keun as Nam Gyeong-dae, police superintendent in Seoul
- Kim Jong-gu as Boss Choi
- Arvind Alok as Bakeem, foreign worker
- Robin Shiek as Salam, foreign worker
- Pokhrel Barun as Hoang, foreign worker
- Lee Hyeon-jeong as Young-nam's landlady

== Reception ==
At the film's official Cannes screening at the Theatre Debussy, the audience gave it a three-minute standing ovation and it received mostly positive reviews from the media. Screen Daily called it "a resolutely left-field and refreshingly off-kilter drama [...] a deftly intriguing tale of alcoholism and abuse that starts off as a seemingly familiar domestic drama before spiralling off into something more unnerving and vaguely disturbing. It is driven by a strong cast and makes the most of it rural location that should be an idyllic but in fact its surface beauty covers up a series of rather dysfunctional people. The film is given heart and soul by a magnetic performance by the excellent Doona Bae."

Variety wrote that the "wrenching drama" is a "layered expose of violence and bigotry in provincial Korean society" powered by "mesmerizing" performances by Bae Doona and Kim Sae-ron. It described Bae's portrayal as "both towering and frail," while "Kim is electrifying." Twitch Film praised it as "Korean cinema at its finest," "gripping from start to finish [...] with its fair share of high drama, but unlike most of its Korean compatriots, it never overplays its hand and treats its audience with respect," and "so well-wrought that one can't help but be swept up in its artistry, which effortlessly plunges us into an intellectual reverie." The Korea Herald said it "deftly blends mystery and thriller," "does an impressive job of tackling modern Korean social issues, including alcoholism, homosexuality, small-town politics, migration and labor," and praised "the three lead actors, especially Bae," who "offer memorable performances as troubled, lonely and searching souls."

The Hollywood Reporter was less impressed: "While Jung's efforts to avoid sensationalism and employ multiple threads are very admirable, the result is a mild-mannered piece short of a sufficiently substantial exposition of its plethora of characters and the problem they face. All this leads to Bae giving an internalized performance dangerously close to blankness; fortunately, Kim is on hand with a turn that suitably brings to the screen the psychotic state of her battered character." Film Business Asia also singled out Kim as "the standout performance in a generally impressive first feature by 34-year-old writer-director July Jung, that could have been even better with one more script revision and more animated playing by Bae. Despite that, it's still an involving drama with few dull moments, continually shifting the power balance between the three main protagonists. [...] All of this is a rich concoction that Jung generally brings off. But there are also annoying loose ends that weaken its dramatic impact, [such as] the backgrounds of the three leads are thinly drawn; and the final act has a slightly too manufactured feel. The film could easily lose 10 minutes to its benefit, by shortening or eliminating the repetitive scenes of the girl's beatings."

== Awards and nominations ==
| Year | Award | Category | Recipient | Result |
|---|---|---|---|---|
| 2014 | 30th Golden Rooster and Hundred Flowers Awards | Best Actress in a Foreign Film | Bae Doona | Won |
| 2014 | 23rd Buil Film Awards | Best Actress | Bae Doona | Nominated |
| 2014 | 23rd Buil Film Awards | Best Supporting Actor | Song Sae-byeok | Nominated |
| 2014 | 23rd Buil Film Awards | Best Supporting Actress | Kim Sae-ron | Nominated |
| 2014 | 23rd Buil Film Awards | Best New Director | July Jung | Won |
| 2014 | 25th Stockholm International Film Festival | Best First Film | A Girl at My Door | Won |
| 2014 | 51st Grand Bell Awards | Best New Director | July Jung | Nominated |
| 2014 | 51st Grand Bell Awards | Best New Actress | Kim Sae-ron | Nominated |
| 2014 | 15th Women in Film Korea Awards | Best Director/Screenwriter | July Jung | Won |
| 2014 | 35th Blue Dragon Film Awards | Best New Actress | Kim Sae-ron | Won |
| 2015 | 20th Chunsa Film Art Awards | Best Actress | Bae Doona | Won |
| 2015 | 20th Chunsa Film Art Awards | Best New Director | July Jung | Nominated |
| 2015 | 9th Asian Film Awards | Best Actress | Bae Doona | Won |
| 2015 | 2nd Wildflower Film Awards | Best Director (Narrative Film) | July Jung | Nominated |
| 2015 | 2nd Wildflower Film Awards | Best Actor | Song Sae-byeok | Nominated |
| 2015 | 2nd Wildflower Film Awards | Best Actress | Bae Doona | Nominated |
| 2015 | 2nd Wildflower Film Awards | Best Actress | Kim Sae-ron | Nominated |
| 2015 | 2nd Wildflower Film Awards | Best Screenplay | July Jung | Won |
| 2015 | 2nd Wildflower Film Awards | Best Cinematography | Kim Hyun-seok | Nominated |
| 2015 | 2nd Wildflower Film Awards | Best New Director | July Jung | Nominated |
| 2015 | 51st Baeksang Arts Awards | Best Film | A Girl at My Door | Nominated |
| 2015 | 51st Baeksang Arts Awards | Best Actress | Bae Doona | Nominated |
| 2015 | 51st Baeksang Arts Awards | Best Actress | Kim Sae-ron | Nominated |
| 2015 | 51st Baeksang Arts Awards | Best Supporting Actor | Song Sae-byeok | Nominated |
| 2015 | 51st Baeksang Arts Awards | Best New Director | July Jung | Won |
