= Baeksang Arts Award for Best Screenplay – Film =

Annual South Korean film award

- Awarded for: Best screenplay of a South Korean film
- Country: South Korea
- Presented by: Baeksang Arts Awards
- Most recent winner: Byun Sung-hyun, Lee Jin-seong; Good News (2026)
- Website: baeksangartsawards

The Baeksang Arts Award for Best Screenplay – Film (Korean: 백상예술대상 영화부문 시나리오상; RR: Baeksang Yesul Daesang Yeonghwa Bumun Sinariosang) is annually presented at the Baeksang Arts Awards ceremony.

== List of winners ==
=== 1960s ===
#	Year	Screenwriter	Film
1st	1965	Kim Gangyun	Deaf Sam-yong
3rd	1967	Kim Jiheon	Late Autumn (만추)
4th	1968	Lee Hyeongpyo	River of Love (애하)
5th	1969	Lee Sanghyeon	

=== 1970s ===
#	Year	Screenwriter	Film
6th	1970	Lee Eunseong	Darling (당신)
7th	1971	Seo Yunseong	The Marines Who Never Returned (특공대와 돌아오지 않는 해병)
8th	1972	Kwak Illo	War and Humanity (전쟁과 인간)
9th	1973	Kang Daeseon	A Judge's Wife (판사 부인)
10th	1974	Nan Hanbong	Weeds (잡초)
11th	1975	Lee Hui-woo	Jin-A's Letter (진아의 편지)
13th	1977	Lee Eunseong	Concentration of Attention (집념)
14th	1978	Kim Jiheon	The Gate (문)
15th	1979	Baek Gyeol	The Last Words from a Comrade in Arms (전우가 남긴 한마디)

=== 1980s ===
#	Year	Screenwriter	Film
16th	1980	Lee Hui-woo	The Ship with no Sail (돛대도 아니 달고)
18th	1982	Lee Sanghyeon; Song Gilhan	Mandala
19th	1983	Ji Sanghak	Stray Dogs (들개)
20th	1984	Baek Gyeol	The Green Pine Tree (일송정 푸른 솔은)
21st	1985	Choe Inho	Deep Blue Night (깊고 푸른 밤)
22nd	1986	Song Gilhan	Gilsoddeum
23rd	1987	Shin Seungsu	Moonlight Hunter (달빛 사냥꾼)
24th	1988	Kwon Hyeonsuk	You My Rose Mellow (접시꽃 당신)
25th	1989	Jang Sun-woo	The Age of Success

=== 1990s ===
#	Year	Screenwriter	Film
26th	1990	Kim Seonghong	Happiness Does Not Come In Grades (행복은 성적순이 아니잖아요)
27th	1991	Kang Je-gyu; Na Honggyun	Who Saw The Dragon's Toenail? (누가 용의 발톱을 보았는가)
28th	1992	Kim Yeongbin; Yu Sanguk	Kim's War (김의 전쟁)
29th	1993	Lee Jeonghui; Hong Giseon	Cutting the Sorrow With a Knife Stuck in the Chest (가슴에 돋는 칼로 슬픔을 자르고)
30th	1994	Jonathan Kim	The Man with Breasts (가슴 달린 남자)
31st	1995	Yuk Sanghyo	Rosy Life (장미빛 인생)
32nd	1996	Lee Chang-dong	A Single Spark
33rd	1997	Lee Chang-dong	Green Fish
34th	1998	Song Neung-han	No. 3
35th	1999	Kim Sung-su	City of the Rising Sun

=== 2000s ===
#	Year	Screenwriter	Film
36th	2000	Jang Jin	The Spy (간첩 리철진)
37th	2001	Go Eun-nim	Bungee Jumping of Their Own
38th	2002	Song Min-ho; Jang Hyun-soo	Ray-Ban (라이방)
39th	2003	Park Jung-woo	Break Out
40th	2004	Yoo Ha	Once Upon a Time in High School
41st	2005	Jeong Yoon-chul	Marathon
42nd	2006	Go Yoon-hee	Rules of Dating
43rd	2007	Lee Hae-young; Lee Hae-jun	Like a Virgin
44th	2008	Kim Hyun-seok	Scout (스카우트)
45th	2009	Kang Hyeong-cheol	Scandal Makers

=== 2010s ===
#	Year	Screenwriter	Film
46th	2010	Jang Min-seok	Secret Reunion
47th	2011	Yook Sang-hyo	He's on Duty
48th	2012	Jeon Kye-soo	Love Fiction
49th	2013	Jeong Byeong-gil	Confession of Murder
50th	2014	Kim Ji-hye; Jo Joong-hoon	Hope
51st	2015	Kim Kyung-chan	Cart
52nd	2016	Ahn Gooc-jin	Alice in Earnestland
53rd	2017	Yoon Ga-eun	The World of Us
54th	2018	Kim Kyung-chan	1987: When the Day Comes
55th	2019	Kwak Kyung-taek, Kim Tae-kyun	Dark Figure of Crime

=== 2020s ===
#	Year	Screenwriter	Film
56th	2020	Lee Sang-geun (이상근)	Exit
57th	2021	Park Ji-wan (박지완)	The Day I Died: Unclosed Case
58th	2022	Jeong Ga-young, Wang Hye-ji	Nothing Serious
59th	2023	Jung Joo-ri	Next Sohee
60th	2024	Jason Yu	Sleep
61st	2025	Shin Chul, Park Chan-wook	Uprising
62nd	2026	Byun Sung-hyun, Lee Jin-seong	Good News

== Sources ==
- "Baeksang Arts Awards Nominees and Winners Lists". Naver Movie (in Korean).
- "Baeksang Arts Awards Winners Lists". Baeksang Arts Awards (in Korean).
