= List of South Korean films of 2023 =

The following is a list of South Korean films released in 2023.

== Box office ==
The highest-grossing South Korean films released in 2023, by domestic box office gross revenue, are as follows:

Highest-grossing films released in 2023
Rank	Title	Distributor	Domestic gross
1	12.12: The Day	Megabox Plus M	$96,160,148
2	The Roundup: No Way Out	ABO Entertainment	$79,459,384
3	Smugglers	Next Entertainment World	$37,711,582
4	Noryang: Deadly Sea	Lotte Cultureworks	$33,868,493
5	Concrete Utopia	Lotte Cultureworks	$28,396,814
6	Love Reset	Mindmark	$16,134,255
7	Dr. Cheon and Lost Talisman	CJ Entertainment	$14,352,608
8	The Point Men	Megabox Plus M	$13,550,750
9	Sleep	Lotte Entertainment	$10,663,284
10	Honey Sweet	Mindmark	$10,318,577

== Released ==
=== January–March ===
Opening		English title	Native title	Director(s)	Cast	Ref.
J A N U A R Y	4	Switch	스위치	Ma Dae-yun	Kwon Sang-woo, Oh Jung-se, Lee Min-jung	
J A N U A R Y	5	Gangnam Zombie	강남좀비	Lee Soo-seong	Park Ji-yeon, Ji Il-joo	
J A N U A R Y	12	Tales of Nobody	별 볼일 없는 인생	Seo Dong-heon	Jeong Ga-eun, Kwak Pil-je, Kim Yi-heon, Noh Jin-won, Na Mi-hee	
J A N U A R Y	12	10-Day Lover	10일간의 애인	Lee Young-yong	Woo Choong-hyun, Song Min-kyung, Cha Sol-mon	
J A N U A R Y	18	The Point Men	교섭	Yim Soon-rye	Hwang Jung-min, Hyun Bin	
J A N U A R Y	18	Phantom	유령	Lee Hae-young	Sul Kyung-gu, Lee Hanee, Park So-dam, Park Hae-soo, Seo Hyun-woo	
J A N U A R Y	20	Jung_E	정이	Yeon Sang-ho	Kang Soo-yeon, Kim Hyun-joo, Ryu Kyung-soo	
F E B R U A R Y	8	Next Sohee	다음 소희	Jung Ju-ri	Kim Si-eun, Bae Doona	
F E B R U A R Y	8	Love My Scent	우리 사랑이 향기로 남을 때	Lim Sung-yong	Yoon Si-yoon, Seol In-ah	
F E B R U A R Y	8	Someone You Loved	어쩌면 우린 헤어졌는지 모른다	Hyoung seul-woo	Lee Dong-hwi, Jung Eun-chae	
F E B R U A R Y	17	Unlocked	스마트폰을 떨어뜨렸을 뿐인데	Kim Tae-joon	Chun Woo-hee, Im Si-wan, Kim Hee-won	
F E B R U A R Y	22	The Assassin	살수	Kwak Jeong-deok	Shin Hyun-joon, Lee Moon-sik, Kim Min-kyung	
F E B R U A R Y	22	Count	카운트	Kwon Hyeok-jae	Jin Seon-kyu, Sung Yoo-bin, Oh Na-ra, Ko Chang-seok, Jang Dong-joo	
M A R C H	1	My Heart Puppy	멍뭉이	Jason Kim	Yoo Yeon-seok, Cha Tae-hyun	
M A R C H	1	The Devil's Deal	대외비	Lee Won-tae	Cho Jin-woong, Lee Sung-min, Kim Mu-yeol	
M A R C H	15	Soulmate	소울메이트	Min Yong-geun	Kim Da-mi, Jeon So-nee, Byeon Woo-seok	
M A R C H	22	Woongnami	웅남이	Park Sung-kwang	Park Sung-Woong, Lee Yi-kyung, Yeom Hye-ran, Choi Min-soo, Oh Dal-su	
M A R C H	31	Kill Boksoon	길복순	Byun Sung-hyun	Jeon Do-yeon, Sul Kyung-gu, Esom, Koo Kyo-hwan	

=== April–June ===
Opening		English title	Native title	Director(s)	Cast	Ref.
A P R I L	5	Swallow	제비	Lee-Song Hee-il	Yoon Park, Jang Hee-ryung, Yoo In-soo, Woo Ji-hyun, Park So-jin	
A P R I L	5	Rebound	리바운드	Jang Hang-jun	Ahn Jae-hong, Lee Shin-young, Jeong Jin-woon, Jung Gun-joo, Ahn Ji-ho, Kim Taek, Kim Min	
A P R I L	12	In Water	물안에서	Hong Sang-soo	Shin Seok-ho, Ha Seong-guk, Kim Seung-yun	
A P R I L	12	Archaeology of Love	사랑의 고고학	Lee Wan-min	Ok Ja-yeon, Kiyoon	
A P R I L	14	Killing Romance	킬링 로맨스	Lee Won-suk	Lee Hanee, Lee Sun-kyun, Gong Myung	
A P R I L	19	Shape of Tulip	튤립 모양	Yang Yun-mo	Yoo Da-in, Kim Da-hyun	
A P R I L	19	Always I am	보이지 않아	Cheon Se-hwan	Han seung-yun, Lee Noa, Jung Hye-in, Park Ho-san, Shin Ae-ra	
A P R I L	19	Punch-Drunk Love	낭만적 공장	Jo Eun-seong	Shim Hee-seop, Jeon Hye-jin	
A P R I L	19	The Ghost Station	옥수역 귀신	Jung Yong-ki	Kim Bo-ra, Kim Jae-hyun	
A P R I L	26	Dream	드림	Lee Byeong-heon	Park Seo-joon, Lee Ji-eun	
M A Y	10	Long D	롱디	Lim Jae-wan	Jang Dong-yoon, Park Yoo-na	
M A Y	18	Colossus: Child of the Wind	거신: 바람의 아이	Shin Chang-sub	Shim Gyu-hyeok, Min-a, Kwon Sung-hyuk, Hwang Chang-yung, Si Yeong-jun, Kim Bo-yeong	
M A Y	31	The Roundup: No Way Out	범죄도시3	Lee Sang-yong	Ma Dong-seok, Lee Joon-hyuk, Munetaka Aoki	
J U N E	21	The Childe	귀공자	Park Hoon-jung	Kim Seon-ho, Kang Tae-joo, Kim Kang-woo, Go Ara	
J U N E	21	In Dream	인 드림	Shin Jai-ho	Seo Hyo-rim, Oh Ji-ho, Kim Seung-soo	
J U N E	28	Labang	라방	Choi Ju-yon	Park Sung-woong, Park Sun-ho, Kim Hee-jung	

=== July–September ===
Opening		English title	Native title	Director(s)	Cast	Ref.
J U L Y	5	The Devils	악마들	Kim Jae-hun	Jang Dong-yoon, Oh Dae-hwan	
J U L Y	26	Smugglers	밀수	Ryoo Seung-wan	Kim Hye-soo, Yum Jung-ah, Zo In-sung, Park Jeong-min, Kim Jong-soo, Go Min-si	
A U G U S T	2	The Moon	더문	Kim Yong-hwa	Sul Kyung-gu, Do Kyung-soo, Kim Hee-ae	
A U G U S T	2	Ransomed	비공식작전	Kim Seong-hoon	Ha Jung-woo, Ju Ji-hoon	
A U G U S T	9	Concrete Utopia	콘크리트 유토피아	Um Tae-hwa	Lee Byung-hun, Park Seo-joon, Park Bo-young, Kim Sun-young, Park Ji-hu	
A U G U S T	15	Honey Sweet	달짝지근해	Lee Han	Yoo Hae-jin, Kim Hee-sun, Cha In-pyo, Jin Seon-kyu, Han Sun-hwa	
A U G U S T	15	A Man of Reason	보호자	Jung Woo-sung	Jung Woo-sung, Kim Nam-gil, Park Sung-woong, Kim Jun-han, Park Yoo-na	
A U G U S T	30	Don't Buy the Seller	타겟	Park Hee-gon	Shin Hye-sun, Kim Sung-kyun	
S E P T E M B E R	6	Sleep	잠	Yoo Jae-sun	Jung Yu-mi, Lee Sun-kyun	
S E P T E M B E R	27	Road to Boston	보스턴 1947	Kang Je-gyu	Ha Jung-woo, Im Si-wan, Bae Seong-woo, Kim Sang-ho	
S E P T E M B E R	27	Cobweb	거미집	Kim Jee-woon	Song Kang-ho, Im Soo-jung, Oh Jung-se, Jeon Yeo-been, Krystal Jung	
S E P T E M B E R	27	Dr. Cheon and Lost Talisman	천박사 퇴마 연구소: 설경의 비밀	Kim Seong-sik	Gang Dong-won, Huh Joon-ho, Esom, Lee Dong-hwi, Kim Jong-soo	

=== October–December ===
Opening		English title	Native title	Director(s)	Cast	Ref.
O C T O B E R	3	Love Reset	30일	Nam Dae-jung	Kang Ha-neul, Jung So-min	
O C T O B E R	6	Ballerina	발레리나	Lee Chung-hyun	Jeon Jong-seo, Kim Ji-hoon	
O C T O B E R	11	Hopeless	화란	Kim Chang-hoon	Hong Xa-bin, Song Joong-ki, Bibi	
O C T O B E R	11	Miss Fortune	화사한 그녀	Lee Seung-jun	Uhm Jung-hwa, Bang Min-ah	
O C T O B E R	19	In Our Day	우리의 하루	Hong Sang-soo	Gi Ju-bong, Kim Min-hee	
O C T O B E R	25	Brave Citizen	용감한 시민	Park Jin-pyo	Shin Hye-sun, Lee Jun-young	
O C T O B E R	25	Open the Door	오픈 더 도어	Jang Hang-jun	Lee Sun-won, Seo Yeong-ju, Kim Su-jin, Kang Ae-sim	
O C T O B E R	25	The Dream Songs	너와 나	Cho Hyun-chul	Park Hye-su, Kim Si-eun	
N O V E M B E R	1	The Boys	소년들	Chung Ji-young	Sul Kyung-gu, Yoo Jun-sang, Jin Kyung, Heo Sung-tae, Yeom Hye-ran	
N O V E M B E R	1	Alone	독친	Kim Soo-in	Jang Seo-hee	
N O V E M B E R	1	Green Night	녹야	Han Shu-ai	Fan Bingbing, Lee Joo-young	
N O V E M B E R	15	Iron Mask	만분의 일초	Kim Seong-hwan	Joo Jong-hyuk, Moon Jin-seung	
N O V E M B E R	17	Believer 2	독전 2	Baek Jong-yul	Cho Jin-woong, Cha Seung-won, Han Hyo-joo, Oh Seung-hoon	
N O V E M B E R	22	12.12: The Day	서울의 봄	Kim Sung-su	Hwang Jung-min, Jung Woo-sung, Lee Sung-min, Park Hae-joon, Kim Sung-kyun	
N O V E M B E R	22	The Loan Boy	사채소년	Hwang Dong-seok	Yoo Seon-ho, Kang Mi-na, Yoo In-soo	
N O V E M B E R	29	Single in Seoul	싱글 인 서울	Park Beom-soo	Lee Dong-wook, Im Soo-jung	
D E C E M B E R	6	Our Season	3일의 휴가	Yook Sang-hyo	Kim Hae-sook, Shin Min-a, Kang Ki-young, Hwang Bo-ra	
D E C E M B E R	6	A Letter from Kyoto	교토에서 온 편지	Kim Min-ju	Han Sun-hwa, Han Chae-ah, Cha Mi-kyung, Song Ji-hyun	
D E C E M B E R	20	Noryang: Deadly Sea	노량: 죽음의 바다	Kim Han-min	Kim Yoon-seok, Baek Yoon-sik, Jung Jae-young, Huh Joon-ho	

== See also ==
- List of 2023 box office number-one films in South Korea
- 2023 in South Korea
