= List of 2023 box office number-one films in South Korea =

The following is a list of 2023 box office number-one films in South Korea by week. When the number-one film in gross is not the same as the number-one film in admissions, both are listed.

== Number-one films ==
†	This implies the highest-grossing movie of the year.

#	Date	Film	Weekly gross	Total gross	Ref.
1	January 8, 2023	Avatar: The Way of Water	$10,584,764	$84,140,919	
2	January 15, 2023	Avatar: The Way of Water	$6,727,563	$90,868,481	
3	January 22, 2023	The Point Men	$5,192,049	$5,205,870	
4	January 29, 2023	The Point Men	$6,088,419	$11,294,290	
5	February 5, 2023	The First Slam Dunk	$3,356,402	$18,728,252	
6	February 12, 2023	The First Slam Dunk	$4,026,777	$22,760,815	
7	February 19, 2023	Ant-Man and the Wasp: Quantumania	$7,126,654	$7,126,654	
8	February 26, 2023	Ant-Man and the Wasp: Quantumania	$3,547,143	$10,550,484	
9	March 5, 2023	The Devil's Deal	$3,781,365	$3,790,424	
10	March 12, 2023	Suzume	$7,359,559	$7,924,251	
11	March 19, 2023	Suzume	$7,726,798	$15,732,806	
12	March 26, 2023	Suzume	$8,070,329	$23,917,890	
13	April 2, 2023	Suzume	$6,138,335	$29,711,844	
14	April 9, 2023	Suzume	$4,240,707	$33,938,959	
15	April 16, 2023	John Wick: Chapter 4	$5,505,382	$5,855,496	
16	April 23, 2023	John Wick: Chapter 4	$3,947,673	$9,720,384	
17	April 30, 2023	The Super Mario Bros. Movie	$5,569,456	$5,758,017	
18	May 7, 2023	Guardians of the Galaxy Vol. 3	$13,163,200	$13,163,200	
19	May 14, 2023	Guardians of the Galaxy Vol. 3	$8,751,545	$21,785,156	
20	May 21, 2023	Fast X	$6,765,664	$6,765,664	
21	May 28, 2023	Fast X	$4,684,307	$11,410,629	
22	June 4, 2023	The Roundup: No Way Out	$31,377,166	$33,935,522	
23	June 11, 2023	The Roundup: No Way Out	$25,099,863	$59,607,468	
24	June 18, 2023	The Roundup: No Way Out	$8,789,220	$68,944,989	
25	June 25, 2023	The Roundup: No Way Out	$5,754,277	$73,570,528	
26	July 2, 2023	Elemental	$7,525,083	$16,962,714	
27	July 9, 2023	Elemental	$8,783,765	$25,880,340	
28	July 16, 2023	Mission: Impossible – Dead Reckoning Part One	$12,869,697	$14,272,587	
29	July 23, 2023	Mission: Impossible – Dead Reckoning Part One	$9,240,167	$23,337,673	
30	July 30, 2023	Smugglers	$12,723,230	$13,045,256	
31	August 6, 2023	Smugglers	$13,415,416	$26,201,478	
32	August 13, 2023	Concrete Utopia	$11,229,232	$11,349,793	
33	August 20, 2023	Oppenheimer	$12,608,439	$12,616,338	
34	August 27, 2023	Oppenheimer	$4,707,307	$17,479,171	
35	September 3, 2023	Oppenheimer	$3,570,853	$22,424,759	
36	September 10, 2023	Sleep	$3,920,965	$3,978,287	
37	September 17, 2023	Sleep	$2,812,515	$6,796,480	
38	September 24, 2023	Sleep	$1,848,211	$9,458,446	
39	October 1, 2023	Dr. Cheon and Lost Talisman	$8,231,362	$8,373,740	
40	October 8, 2023	Love Reset	$4,402,000	$4,533,246	
41	October 15, 2023	Love Reset	$4,330,228	$8,845,336	
42	October 22, 2023	Love Reset	$2,806,914	$11,654,241	
43	October 29, 2023	The Boy and the Heron	$6,789,644	$6,789,644	
44	November 5, 2023	The Boy and the Heron	$4,068,587	$11,126,769	
45	November 12, 2023	The Marvels	$3,408,933	$3,408,933	
46	November 19, 2023	Five Nights at Freddy's	$1,854,405	$1,856,119	
47	November 26, 2023	12.12: The Day †	$13,972,103	$14,079,167	
48	December 3, 2023	12.12: The Day †	$20,104,710	$34,192,747	
49	December 10, 2023	12.12: The Day †	$17,185,677	$50,950,148	
50	December 17, 2023	12.12: The Day †	$14,839,777	$66,510,311	
51	December 24, 2023	Noryang: Deadly Sea	$12,636,003	$12,846,741	
52	December 31, 2023	Noryang: Deadly Sea	$13,312,608	$26,197,614	

== Highest-grossing films ==
International film South Korean film

Highest-grossing films of 2023
Rank	Title	Distributor	Domestic gross
1	12.12: The Day	Megabox Plus M	$88,799,883
2	The Roundup: No Way Out	ABO Entertainment	$81,216,243
3	Elemental	Walt Disney	$54,581,219
4	Suzume	Toho	$43,794,719
5	Smugglers	Next Entertainment World	$38,131,243
6	The First Slam Dunk	Toei Company	$38,195,472
7	Avatar: The Way of Water	20th Century Studios	$35,468,812
8	Guardians of the Galaxy Vol. 3	Walt Disney	$34,024,057
9	Mission: Impossible – Dead Reckoning Part One	Paramount Pictures	$31,010,806
10	Concrete Utopia	Lotte Entertainment	$28,697,401

== See also ==
- List of South Korean films of 2023
- List of 2022 box office number-one films in South Korea
- 2023 in South Korea
