= 59th Grand Bell Awards =

2023 edition of award ceremony

- Official poster
- Awarded for: Excellence in cinematic achievements
- Awarded by: The Grand Bell Awards Film Festival Committee
- Presented by: Gyeonggi Arts Center
- Announced on: Nominations: October 24, 2023
- Presented on: November 15, 2023
- Site: Gyeonggi Arts Center Grand Theater and Convention Hall, Gyeonggi, South Korea
- Hosted by: Cha In-pyo; Jang Do-yeon

Highlights
- Best Film: Concrete Utopia
- Best Director: Ryoo Seung-wan
- Best Actor: Lee Byung-hun
- Best Actress: Kim Seo-hyung
- Most awards: Concrete Utopia – 6
- Most nominations: Cobweb – 14

Television coverage
- Network: ENA

The 59th Grand Bell Awards (Korean: 제59회 대종상 영화제; RR: Daejongsang Yeonghwajae), also known as Daejong International Film Awards, is determined and presented annually by The Motion Pictures Association of Korea for excellence in film in South Korea. The Grand Bell Awards were first presented in 1962 and have gained prestige as the Korean equivalent of the American Academy Awards. The 59th edition of the award ceremony was co-hosted with the Gyeonggi Arts Center for the first time at the Gyeonggi Arts Center Grand Theater and Convention Hall on November 15, 2023. Cha In-pyo and Jang Do-yeon were master of ceremonies for the award night.

Concrete Utopia won six awards including three popular awards viz.: Best Picture, Best Actor, Best Supporting Actress, and three technical awards viz.: Visual Effects, Sound Effects, and Art Awards.

== Judging panel ==
The judging panel consisted of 9 members:

- Jeong Sung-il, film critic
- Kim Hong-shin, novelist
- Won Dong-yeon, film producer
- Jo Hye-jeong, Chung-Ang University professor
- Kim Do-young, film director
- Park Jong-won, Korea National University of Arts professor
- Kim Sun-a, head of the Women's Filmmakers' Association
- Kang Kyung-ho, Kyonggi University professor
- Sung Joon-hyun, Theater Directors Association

== Nominations and winners ==
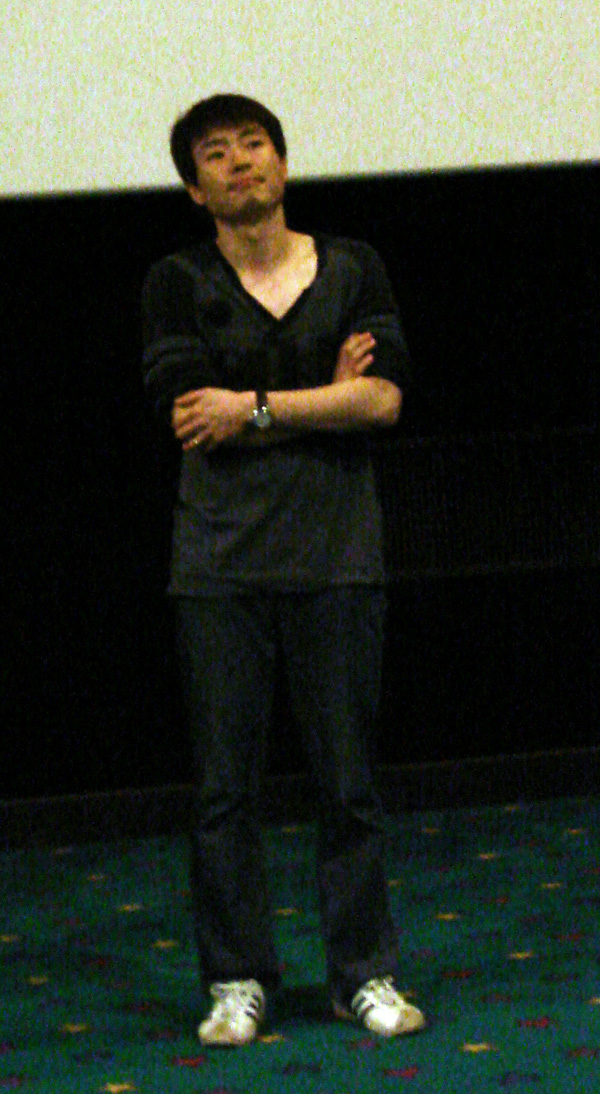
Ryoo Seung-wan, Best Director

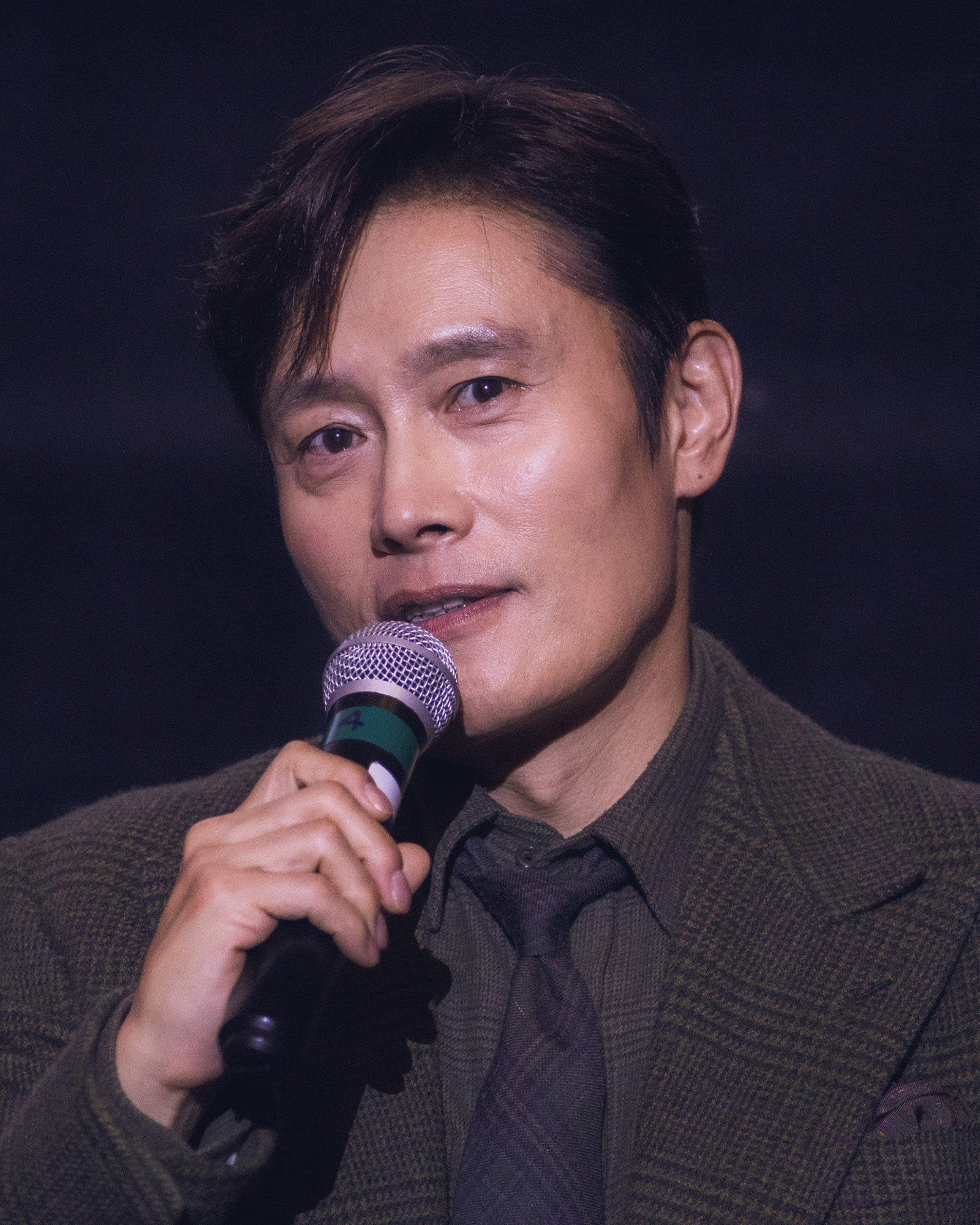
Lee Byung-hun, winner of Best Actor Award

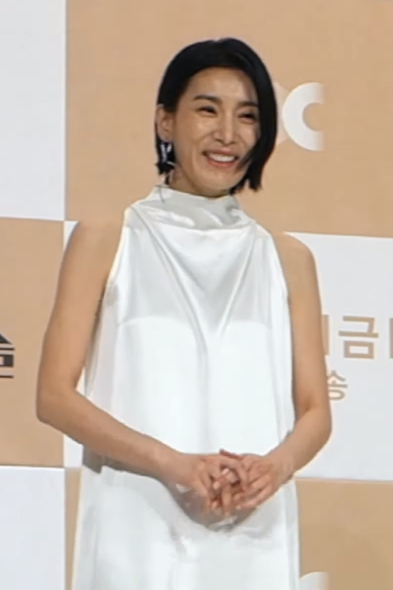
Kim Seo-hyung, winner of Best Actress Award

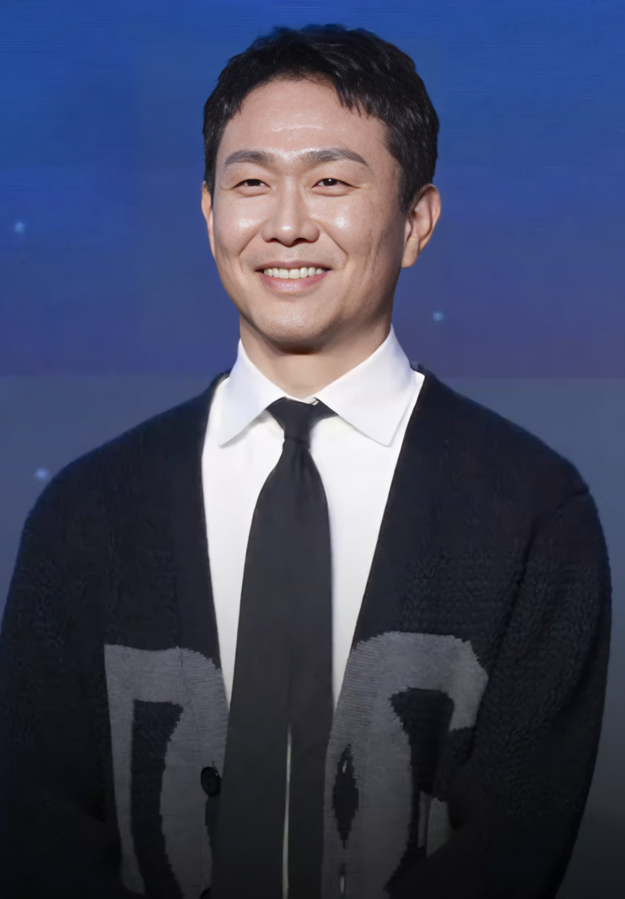
Oh Jung-se, winner of Best Supporting Actor Award

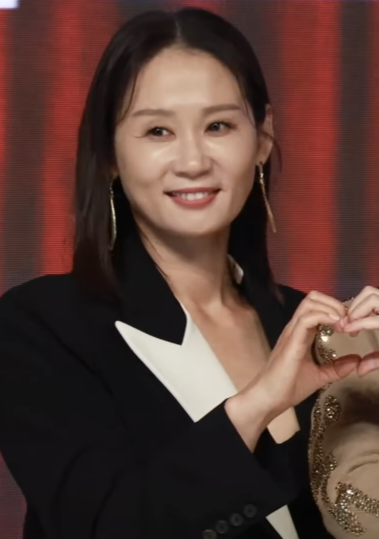
Kim Sun-young, winner of Best Supporting Actress Award

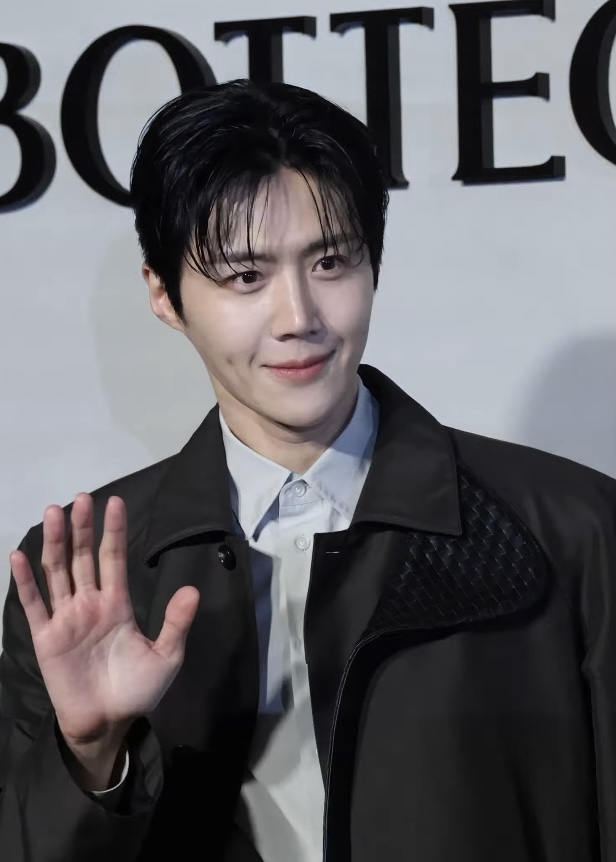
Kim Seon-ho, winner of Best New Actor Award

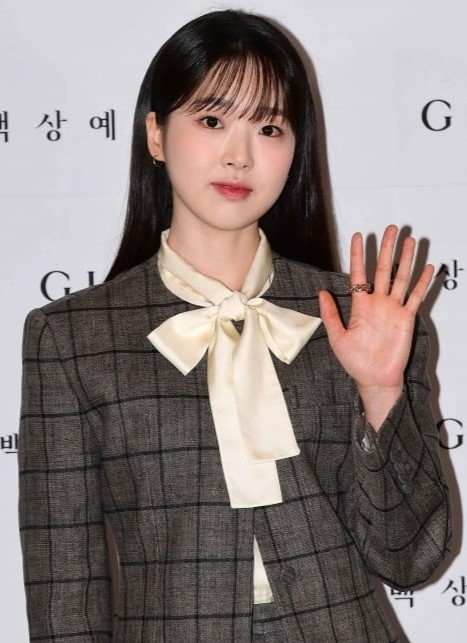
Kim Si-eun, winner of Best New Actress Award

The Grand Bell Awards Committee selected the nominees for all domestic releases (including series) from October 1, 2022 to September 30, 2023. The nominations for best film were announced on October 20, and for the rest of categories on 24th.

(Winners denoted in bold)

=== Film awards ===
**Best Film**	**Best Director**
**Concrete Utopia**; Cobweb; Smugglers; The Night Owl; Next Sohee; Sleep	**Ryoo Seung-wan – Smugglers**; Kang Je-gyu – Road to Boston; Um Tae-hwa – Concrete Utopia; Kim Jee-woon – Cobweb; Jung Ju-ri – Next Sohee; Yim Soon-rye – The Point Men
**Best Actor**	**Best Actress**
**Lee Byung-hun – Concrete Utopia as Kim Yeong-tak**; Song Kang-ho – Cobweb as Kim Ki-yeol; Ryu Jun-yeol – The Night Owl as Cheon Kyung-soo; Doh Kyung-soo – The Moon as Hwang Sun-woo; Im Si-wan – Road to Boston as Suh Yun-bok	**Kim Seo-hyung – Green House**; Yum Jung-ah – Smugglers as Um Jin-sook; Jung Yu-mi – Sleep as Jung Soo-jin; Bae Doona – Next Sohee as Oh Yoo-jin; Kim Sun-young – Dream Palace as Hye-jeong; Yang Mal-bok – The Apartment with Two Women
**Best Supporting Actor**	**Best Supporting Actress**
**Oh Jung-se – Cobweb as Kang Ho-se**; Kim Jong-soo – Smugglers as Lee Jang-chun; Ko Kyu-pil – The Roundup: No Way Out as Cho Rong-i; Park Jeong-min – Smugglers as Jang Do-ri; Kang Ki-young – The Point Men	**Kim Sun-young – Concrete Utopia as Kim Geum-ae**; Go Min-si – Smugglers as Go Ok-bun; Na Moon-hee – Hero as Cho Maria; Krystal Jung – Cobweb as Han Yu-rim; Jeon Yeo-been – Cobweb as Shin Mi-do
**Best New Actor**	**Best New Actress**
**Kim Seon-ho – The Childe as Nobleman (Gwigongja)**; Park Sung-hoon – Hail to Hell as Han Myeong-ho; Lee Shin-young – Rebound as Cheon Ki-beom; Kim Sung-cheol – The Night Owl as Crown Prince Sohyeon; Byeon Woo-seok – Soulmate as Ham Jin-woo	**Kim Si-eun – Next Sohee as So-hee**; Ahn Eun-jin – The Night Owl as Jo So-yong; Im Jee-ho – The Apartment with Two Women; Oh Woo-ri – Hail to Hell; Moon Seung-a – The Hill of Secrets
**Best New Director**	**Best Screenplay**
**Ahn Tae-jin – The Night Owl**; Lee Sol-hui – Green House; Kim Se-in – The Apartment with Two Women; Jason Yu – Sleep; Lee Ji-eun – The Hill of Secrets; Ka Sung-moon – Dream Palace	**Ahn Tae-jin, Hyun Eun-mi– The Night Owl**; Um Tae-hwa, Lee Sin-ji – Concrete Utopia; Shin Yeon-sick – Cobweb; Jung Ju-ri – Next Sohee; Jason Yu – Sleep; Kim Se-in – The Apartment with Two Women
**Best Music**	**Best Art Direction**
**Dalpalan – Phantom**; Chang Kiha – Smugglers; Hwang Sang-jun – Hero; Kim Hae-won – Concrete Utopia; Mowg – Cobweb; Jang Hyuk-jin, Jang Yong-jin – Sleep	**Cho Hwa-sung, Choi Hyun-seouk – Concrete Utopia**; Shin Yu-jin – Killing Romance; Jung Yi-jin – Cobweb; Lee Hoo-kyoung – Smugglers; Hong Ju-hui – The Moon; Kim Bo-muk – Phantom
**Best Cinematography**	**Best Visual Effects**
**Choi Young-hwan – Smugglers**; Kim Tae-kyeong – The Night Owl; Kim Young-ho – The Moon; Cho Hyoung-rae – Concrete Utopia; Kim Tae-seong – Ransomed; Kim Jee-yong – Cobweb	**Eun Jae-hyun – Concrete Utopia**; Jin Jong-hyun – The Moon; Park Sung-jin – Cobweb; Noh Nam-seok – Ransomed; Hwang Jin-hye, Kim Han-jun – Dr. Cheon and Lost Talisman; Heo Myeong-hoeng – Phantom
**Best Sound**	**Best Costume Design**
**Kim Suk-won – Concrete Utopia**; Choi Tae-young – The Moon; Park Yong-ki – The Night Owl; Park Joo-Gang – Hero; Gong Tae-won – Sleep; Choi Tae-won – Cobweb	**Yoon Jung-hee – Killing Romance**; Yoon Jung-hee, Kwon Soo-kyung – Smugglers; Ham Hyun-ju – Phantom; Choi Eui-young– Cobweb; Chae Gyeong-hwa – Road to Boston; Shim Hyun-seop – Hero; Shim Hyun-seop – The Night Owl
**Best Film Editing**	**Documentary Award**
**Kim Sun-min – The Night Owl**; Lee Gang-hee – Smugglers; Yang Jin-mo – Cobweb; Han Mi-yeon – Concrete Utopia; Kim Chang-ju – Ransomed; Lee Seon-min – Hero	**Yang Yong-hi – Soup and Ideology**; Go Hee-young – Legend of the Waterflowers; Hwang Yoon – Sura: A Love Song; Mario Lee – Little Garden; Lee So-hyun – The Talent Show
**Daejong's Attention Award (work)**	**Daejong's Attention Award (actor)**
**Dream Palace by Ka Sung-moon**	**Jung Sung-hwa in Hero**
**Daejong's Attention Award (director)**	**Lifetime Achievement Award**
**Park Jae-beom – Mother's Land: Grisha, Master of the Forest**	**Jang Mi-hee**

=== Series awards ===
Best Series	Best Director Series
**Moving (Disney+)**; The Glory (Netflix); Mask Girl (Netflix); Big Bet (Disney+)	**Kang Yoon-sung – Big Bet**; Lee Jong-pil – One Day Off; Kim Yong-hun – Mask Girl; Ahn Gil-ho – The Glory; Park In-je, Park Yoon-seo – Moving
Best Actor in a Series	Best Actress in a Series
**Choi Min-sik – Big Bet as Cha Mu-sik**; Ryu Seung-ryong – Moving as Jang Ju-won; Jung Hae-in – D.P. Season 2 as Ahn Jun-ho; Jin Seon-kyu – Bargain as Noh Hyung-soo; Lee Sung-min – Shadow Detective as Kim Taek-rok; Ahn Jae-hong – Mask Girl as Joo Oh-nam	**Han Hyo-joo – Moving as Lee Mi-hyun**; Song Hye-kyo – The Glory as Moon Dong-eun; Lee Na-young – One Day Off as Park Ha-kyung; Go Hyun-jung – Mask Girl as Kim Mo-mi; Jeon Jong-seo – Bargain as Park Joo-young; Yeom Hye-ran – Mask Girl as Kim Kyung-ja

== Films with multiple nominations ==
The following films received multiple nominations:

Nominations	Films
14	Cobweb
11	Smugglers
11	Concrete Utopia
10	The Night Owl
6	Sleep
5	Hero
5	Next Sohee
5	The Moon
4	Phantom
3	Road to Boston
3	Ransomed
3	The Apartment with Two Women
2	The Point Men
2	Green House
2	Dream Palace
2	The Hill of Secrets
2	Killing Romance
2	Hail to Hell

== See also ==
- 59th Baeksang Arts Awards
- 32nd Buil Film Awards
- Chunsa Film Art Awards 2023
