= The Divorce Insurance =

2025 South Korean television series

- Promotional poster
- Hangul: 이혼보험
- Hanja: 離婚保險
- RR: Ihon boheom
- MR: Ihon pohŏm
- Genre: Workplace; Romantic comedy
- Written by: Lee Tae-yoon
- Directed by: Lee Won-suk; Choi Bo-kyung
- Starring: Lee Dong-wook; Lee Joo-bin; Lee Kwang-soo; Lee Da-hee
- Country of origin: South Korea
- Original language: Korean
- No. of episodes: 12

Production
- Production companies: KT Studio Genie; MongJakSo; Mondo Studio

Original release
- Network: tvN
- Release: March 31 – May 6, 2025

The Divorce Insurance (Korean: 이혼보험) is a 2025 South Korean romantic comedy workplace television series written by Lee Tae-yoon, directed by Lee Won-suk and Choi Bo-kyung, and starring Lee Dong-wook, Lee Joo-bin, Lee Kwang-soo and Lee Da-hee. It aired on tvN every Monday and Tuesday at 20:50 (KST) from March 31 to May 6, 2025. It is also available for streaming on TVING in South Korea and Amazon Prime Video in selected regions.

It became one of the lowest-rated Korean dramas of 2025. A 0.9% viewership rating was recorded nationwide for the series' penultimate episode, making it one of the lowest in the network's history.

== Synopsis ==
Noh Ki-jun is a successful actuary at an insurance company whose love going badly. After going through three divorces and losing a lot of money and happiness each time, he decides to make a new kind of insurance: divorce insurance. As Ki-jun works through the challenges of creating and launching this unique product, on his journey, he faces different types of problems at work and in his personal life. Ki-jun works with a group of co-workers, each with their special traits and backgrounds, as they try to determine how much divorce costs and learn more about love and relationships. As Ki-jun looks more closely at divorce, he starts to think about his past relationships and why they did not work out. He begins to like one of his coworkers, which could lead to a workplace romance.

Kang Han-deul is a smart underwriter, with an imperfect divorced life, and a bad relationship with her family. She joined an insurance company with a group of co-workers who decided to make a new type of insurance. Han-deul likes one of her coworkers. They explore themes of love, relationships, and divorce while facing obstacles in launching a new type of insurance.

== Cast and characters ==
=== Main ===
- Lee Dong-wook as Noh Ki-jun

An insurance actuary of Innovative Product Development Team at Plus General Insurance who has been divorced three times.

- Lee Joo-bin as Kang Han-deul

An underwriter (insurance contract review) who works in Ki-jun's team after she filed a divorce for being mistreated by her in-laws.

- Lee Kwang-soo as An Jeong-man

A cautious safety-first individual who is Ki-jun's long-time friend.

- Lee Da-hee as Jeon Na-rae

A financial mathematician who only views the world from an investment perspective.

=== Supporting ===
- Kim Won-hae as Na Dae-bok

A team leader of the Hope Life Innovation Product Development Team.

- Chu So-jung as Jo Ah-young

A loss adjuster at Plus General Insurance who determines the amount of damages for insurance accidents and pays out insurance money.

- Yoo Hyun-soo as Park Woong-sik

A dancer and farmer who learned emotions through dance and philosophy through farming.

=== Special appearance ===
- Jo Bo-ah as one of Ki-jun's ex-wife who later became a monk
- Han Sun-hwa as Gu Mi-rae, a tarot master on the verge of divorce
- Kwak Si-yang as Shin hyun-jae, a documentary photographer whose prolonged absences strain his marriage to Gu Mi-rae

== Production ==
=== Development ===
Director Lee Won-suk, who directed Killing Romance (2023), and Choi Bo-kyung to co-direct while writer Lee Tae-yoon, who wrote Secret Royal Inspector & Joy (2021), penned the series. It was planned by CJENM Studios and KT Studio Genie and produced by MongJakSo and Mondo Studio.

=== Casting ===
In June 2024, Lee Dong-wook had been offered the series' lead role and was in the final stages of coordination. The next month, it was reported that both Lee Kwang-soo and Lee Joo-bin were cast. In September 2024, Lee Da-hee was cast to play one of the lead roles.

In February 2025, the four leads had confirmed their appearances for the series.

== Release ==
The Divorce Insurance was reportedly scheduled to air in the first half of 2025. In January 2025, TVN revealed its drama lineup for 2025, and the series was announced to premiere in March. It was confirmed to be broadcast on March 31, and would air every Monday and Tuesday at 20:50 (KST). It was made available for streaming on TVING in South Korea and Amazon Prime Video in selected regions.

== Viewership ==
The Divorce Insurance : South Korea viewers per episode (thousands)

Season	Episode number												Average
Season	1	2	3	4	5	6	7	8	9	10	11	12	Average
1	792	619	455	296	402	287	303	N/A	310	N/A	N/A	N/A	N/A

Source: Audience measurement performed nationwide by Nielsen Korea.

Average TV viewership ratings
Ep.	Original broadcast date	Average audience share (Nielsen Korea)	
Ep.	Original broadcast date	Nationwide	Seoul
1	March 31, 2025	3.235% (1st)	3.612% (1st)
2	April 1, 2025	2.412% (2nd)	2.841% (1st)
3	April 7, 2025	2.028% (1st)	2.039% (2nd)
4	April 8, 2025	1.384% (6th)	1.680% (4th)
5	April 14, 2025	1.603% (3rd)	1.699% (3rd)
6	April 15, 2025	1.261% (6th)	1.458% (4th)
7	April 21, 2025	1.355% (4th)	1.353% (4th)
8	April 22, 2025	1.0% (17th)	N/A
9	April 28, 2025	1.379% (2nd)	1.788% (2nd)
10	April 29, 2025	1.05% (17th)	1.103% (8th)
11	May 5, 2025	0.9% (23th)	N/A
12	May 6, 2025	1.1% (14th)	N/A
Average		1.642%	—
In the table above, the blue numbers represent the lowest ratings and the red numbers represent the highest ratings.; N/A ratings that were not published.; This drama aired on a cable channel/pay TV which normally has a relatively smaller audience compared to free-to-air TV/public broadcasters (KBS, SBS, MBC, and EBS).
