= Kim Joong-hee =

South Korean actor (born 1984)

- Born: September 8, 1984 (age 42); South Korea
- Education: Kyung Hee University College of Art and Design
- Occupation: Actor
- Years active: 2011–present
- Agent: GILSTORY ENT

Korean name
- Hangul: 김중희
- RR: Gim Junghui
- MR: Kim Chunghŭi

Kim Joong-hee (Korean: 김중희; born September 8, 1984) is a South Korean actor. He is known for his roles in the films The Battleship Island and The Drug King, and the television series Mr. Sunshine, Through the Darkness, and Moving.

Kim made his acting debut in 2011 with the film Marrying the Mafia IV. He has since appeared in numerous films and television series. In 2022, he signed with GILSTORY ENT.

== Education ==
Kim attended Kyung Hee University's College of Art and Design, where he studied Theatre and Film.

== Filmography ==
=== Film ===
Year	Title	Role	Notes	Ref.
2011	Marrying the Mafia IV			
2014	Salut d'Amour			
2015	Love Clinic	Snack cart vendor		
2016	Operation Chromite	Jo Hyun-pil		
2017	The Battleship Island	Yamada		
2018	Monstrum	Mak-gae		
2018	Too Hot to Die	Gwang-ho		
2018	The Drug King	Japanese detective		
2020	Innocence	Bang Jung-hwan		
2020	Steel Rain 2: Summit	Deputy Chief of Political Affairs		
2022	Hero	Wada		
2022	Confidential Assignment 2: International	Voice phishing team manager		
2023	Phantom	Tadashi Sakuma		
2023	Cobweb	Dr. Koo		
2023	Noryang: Deadly Sea	Tachibana Muneshige		

=== Television series ===
Year	Title	Role	Notes	Ref.
2017	Criminal Minds			
2017	Live Up to Your Name	Japanese officer	Guest role; episodes 11 and 15	
2018	Mr. Sunshine	Lee Deok-mun		
2019	Nokdu Flower	Son Byeong-hee		
2020	Delayed Justice	Kim Kyung-il	Guest role; episodes 1, 13 and 20	
2021	Voice 4	Gu Up-jin	Guest role; episodes 2–3	
2021	Dr. Brain	Japanese restaurant owner	Guest role; episode 1	
2022	Through the Darkness	Nam Gi-tae	Guest role	
2023	Moving	Lim Jae-seok	Guest role; episodes 18–20	
2024	Marry My Husband	Kim Gyeong-uk		
2024	Flex X Cop	Park Jae-geun	Guest role; episodes 5–6	
2024	Brewing Love	Yeom Jang-gyun		
2024	Family Matters	Jung Ho-cheol		
2024	Squid Game	Doctor	Guest role	
2025	Trigger	Wang Dae-hyeon	Guest role; episodes 4 and 7–10	
2025	The Manipulated	Kim Sang-rak		
2026	100 Days of Deception	Fukuda		
