= Hero (2022 South Korean film) =

2022 South Korean musical biography film

- Theatrical release poster
- Hangul: 영웅
- Hanja: 英雄
- RR: Yeongung
- MR: Yŏngung
- Directed by: Yoon Je-kyoon
- Screenplay by: Han Ah-reum; Yoon Je-kyoon
- Based on: Hero by Han Ah-reum
- Produced by: Han Ah-reum; Jeon Min; Lee Chang-woo
- Starring: Jung Sung-hwa; Kim Go-eun; Na Moon-hee
- Cinematography: Cho Sang-yoon
- Edited by: Kim Sun-min
- Music by: Hwang Sang-jun; Oh Sang-jun
- Production companies: JK Film; ACOM Co., Ltd.
- Distributed by: CJ Entertainment
- Release date: December 21, 2022
- Running time: 120 minutes
- Country: South Korea
- Languages: Korean; Japanese; Russian
- Box office: US$24.8 million

Hero (Korean: 영웅; RR: Yeongung) is a 2022 South Korean historical musical drama film directed by Yoon Je-kyoon, starring Jung Sung-hwa, Kim Go-eun, and Na Moon-hee. Based on the stage musical of the same name, the film follows the true story of An Jung-geun, a Korean-independence activist who assassinated Itō Hirobumi, the first Prime Minister of Japan and Resident-General of Korea in 1909. It was released theatrically on December 21, 2022.

== Plot ==
Leaving his mother, Jo Maria, and his family behind, An Jung-geun, the leader of the Korean righteous army, departs his hometown.

Together with his comrades, An strengthens his resolve for national independence by forming the Danji Alliance, an oath sealed by severing the fourth finger. Sworn in blood, he vows to assassinate Itō Hirobumi, the mastermind behind Japan's invasion of Joseon, within three years or take his own life if he fails.

To fulfill his promise, Ahn Jung-geun travels to Vladivostok. Alongside his longtime ally Woo Deok-soon, sharpshooter Cho Do-seon, the youngest member of the independence army Yoo Dong-ha, and comrade Ma Jin-joo, who cares for the troops, he begins preparations for the mission.

Meanwhile, Seol-hee, an intelligence operative of the independence army, conceals her identity and infiltrates Itō Hirobumi's circle. Risking her life to gather information deep in enemy territory, she urgently relays a top-secret report that Hirobumi will soon visit Harbin for a meeting with Russia.

Finally, on October 26, 1909, the day An Jung-geun has been awaiting arrives. At Harbin Station, he unhesitatingly pulls the trigger on Itō Hirobumi upon his arrival. Captured at the scene, An Jung-geun faces trial not as a prisoner of war but as a criminal under Japanese law, not Joseon's.

== Cast ==
- Jung Sung-hwa as An Jung-geun
- Kim Go-eun as Seol-hee
- Na Moon-hee as Cho Maria
- Jo Jae-yoon as Woo Deok-soon
- Bae Jung-nam as Cho Do-seon
- Lee Hyun-woo as Yoo Dong-ha
- Park Jin-joo as Ma Jin-joo
- Jo Woo-jin as Ma Do-sik
- Lee Il-hwa as Empress Myeongseong
- Kim Seung-rak as Ito Hirobumi
- Jang Young-nam as Lady Kim Ah-ryeo
- Kim Joong-hee as Wada
- Nojima Naoto as Chiba (Japanese-Korean interpreter & prison guard)

== Production ==
Principal photography began on September 10, 2019, with South Korea and Latvia as the main shooting location. The filming wrapped on December 15, 2019.

== Release ==
The first poster and teaser trailer debuted on March 26, 2020. It was slated to release theatrically in July 2020, but due to COVID-19 pandemic its release was delayed.

== Philanthropy ==
On December 15, 2022, Film Hero donated 8.15 million won to 815 Run to renovate the homes of the children of freedom fighters.

== Accolades ==
Name of the award ceremony, year presented, category, nominee of the award, and the result of the nomination
Award ceremony	Year	Category	Nominee / Work	Result	Ref.
Buil Film Awards	2023	Best Cinematography	Cho Sang-yoon	Nominated	
Buil Film Awards	2023	Best Music	Hwang Sang-jun	Nominated	
Director's Cut Awards	2023	Best Director in film	Yoon Je-kyoon	Nominated	
Director's Cut Awards	2023	Best Actor in film	Jung Sung-hwa	Nominated	
Director's Cut Awards	2023	Best Actress in film	Kim Go-eun	Nominated	
Director's Cut Awards	2023	Best New Actress in film	Park Jin-joo	Nominated	
Golden Cinema Awards	2023	Best Cinematography	Cho Sang-yoon	Silver	
Grand Bell Awards	2023	Best Supporting Actress	Na Moon-hee	Nominated	
Grand Bell Awards	2023	Best Music	Hwang Sang-jun	Nominated	
Grand Bell Awards	2023	Best Sound	Park Ju-kang	Nominated	
Grand Bell Awards	2023	Best Costume Design	Shim Hyun-seob	Nominated	
Grand Bell Awards	2023	Best Editing	Lee Seon-min	Nominated	
Grand Bell Awards	2023	Public Attention Award	Jung Sung-hwa	Won	
Marie Claire Asia Star Awards	2023	Marie Claire Award	Kim Go-eun	Won	
Blue Dragon Film Awards	2023	Best Music	Hwang Sang-jun	Nominated	
