= How to Use Guys with Secret Tips =

- Film poster
- Hangul: 남자사용설명서
- RR: Namja sayong seolmyeongseo
- MR: Namja sayong sŏlmyŏngsŏ
- Directed by: Lee Won-suk
- Written by: Lee Won-suk; Noh Hye-young; Ha Su-jin
- Produced by: Kim Hyun-shin; Eo Ji-yeon; Yoon Chang-sook
- Starring: Lee Si-young; Oh Jung-se; Park Yeong-gyu
- Cinematography: Kim Sun-ryung
- Edited by: Kim Chang-ju; Kim Woo-hyeon
- Music by: Mowg
- Distributed by: Showbox
- Release date: February 14, 2013
- Running time: 116 minutes
- Country: South Korea
- Language: Korean
- Budget: ₩4 billion
- Box office: US$2,956,304

How to Use Guys with Secret Tips (Korean: 남자사용설명서; lit. 'A Manual on How to Use Men') is a 2013 South Korean romantic comedy film starring Lee Si-young and Oh Jung-se, and directed by Lee Won-suk.

== Cast ==
- Lee Si-young as Choi Bo-na
- Oh Jung-se as Lee Seung-jae
- Park Yeong-gyu as Dr. Swarski
- Kim Jung-tae as Woo Sung-chul, Bo-na's ex
- Lee Won-jong as Yook Bong-ah, director
- Bae Sung-woo as CEO Jin, Seung-jae's manager
- Jun-seong Kim as Oh Ji-hoon
- Kim Min-jae as assistant director Jo Seung-hwan, assistant director
- Kyung Soo-jin as Kim Mi-ra, office cutie
- Ahn Yong-joon as Sung-jae
- Cheon Jin-ho as Jong-seok, Seung-jae's assistant
- Yang Yoon-young as Yoon Ji-eun, actress
- Hwang In-chung as Seung-jae's stylist
- Anton as model in video
- Tanya as model in video
- Kim Young-woong as director of photography
- Kim Kyung-jin as man trying to get into taxi
- Lee Mu-young as morning TV program MC
- Ryu Hyun-kyung as woman who spots Seung-jae near Bo-na's apartment
- Sa-hee as Yoon-hee
- Ji Chang-wook as Hong-joon
- Cha Chung-hwa as Bo-na's friend 2
- Park Sung-taek as advertising agency PD
- Yoon Seok-joo as photographer
- Cha Jong-ho as cash replacement

== Production ==
This was the feature directorial debut of Lee Won-suk, a graduate of the American Film Institute. Lee said the film was initially a black comedy, but during its seven-year pre-production, he made compromises in order to make the film more appealing commercially. Nevertheless, he retained the satirical bent and issues he wanted to highlight, such as gender inequality, and the societal practice where shrewd people are more likely to succeed than those who simply work hard. Though classified as a romantic comedy, Lee called it more of a "fantasy," saying, "In the end, she gets everything she wanted. But that does not happen in real life no matter how earnestly people live their lives."

Lee's background in advertising was also apparent in his incorporation of manga-like screen graphics and animation in the film's backgrounds and visual patterns.

== Reception ==
How to Use Guys with Secret Tips was released on February 14, 2013. The film produced strong word-of-mouth among viewers, though not enough to make it a hit in a month when it was sharing screens with box office behemoths The Berlin File, New World and Miracle in Cell No. 7.

Koreanfilm.org praised the film's "great comic timing," the "charismatic" performances by its lead actors and its "multitude of gags that are genuinely funny." The review said it felt "fresh and new, but it is also simply a very well executed film. In a genre that looks easy, but is actually quite challenging, this is a significant accomplishment."

Twitch Film particularly noted the film's "unique, vibrant and endlessly creative aesthetic," and director Lee's "keen sense of style." It also said "one of the film's great strengths is its excellent soundtrack, which runs the gamut of indie music, pop and club beats, not to mention Ravel."

In April 2013, the film won the Audience Award at the 15th Far East Film Festival in Udine, Italy, and director Lee Won-suk also received the Golden Mulberry Award. In August 2013, it won the Bronze Prize for Best Asian Feature at the Fantasia Festival.
