= Phantom (2023 film) =

2023 South Korean spy action film

- Theatrical release poster
- Hangul: 유령
- Hanja: 幽靈
- RR: Yuryeong
- MR: Yuryŏng
- Directed by: Lee Hae-young
- Screenplay by: Lee Hae-young
- Based on: The Message (风声) by Mai Jia
- Produced by: Park Un-kyoung; Jung Chang-hoon
- Starring: Sul Kyung-gu; Lee Hanee; Park So-dam; Park Hae-soo; Seo Hyun-woo
- Cinematography: Ju Sung-lim
- Edited by: Yang Jin-mo
- Music by: Dalpalan
- Production company: The Lamp
- Distributed by: CJ Entertainment
- Release date: January 18, 2023
- Running time: 133 minutes
- Country: South Korea
- Languages: Korean; Japanese
- Box office: US$5.2 million

Phantom (Korean: 유령; RR: Yuryeong) is a 2023 South Korean period spy action thriller film based on Mai Jia's 2007 novel, Feng Sheng. It was directed by Lee Hae-young, starring Sul Kyung-gu, Lee Hanee, Park So-dam, Park Hae-soo, and Seo Hyun-woo. The film was released theatrically on January 18, 2023.

== Plot ==
In 1933, during the Japanese colonization of Korea, the story begins with an underground anti-Japanese organization's failed attempt to assassinate the new Japanese resident-general on his first day in Seoul. The Japanese colonial government gathers five suspects in a remote hotel on a seaside cliff to hunt down "phantom," a spy planted by an anti-Japanese organization in Gyeongseong, within a day. Caught up in the game of life and under close scrutiny by the Japanese authorities, the suspects snoop around the rooms and search others' belongings to clear their suspicions.

== Cast ==
=== Main ===
- Sul Kyung-gu as Murayama Junji

A Japanese police officer who used to be a soldier, but was deposed from the Police Department and dispatched as a communication officer and supervisor within the Government-General.

- Lee Hanee as Park Cha-kyung

An employee of the communication department that records cryptograms.

- Park So-dam as Yuriko

A powerful figure in the Joseon government-general, who became the direct secretary of the general political affairs chief even though she is a Korean.

- Park Hae-soo as Takahara Kaito

The captain who directs the entrapment investigation to find the spy within the Governor-General.

- Seo Hyun-woo as Cheon Gye-jang

A timid character with sharp deciphering skills as a communication and code cracker.

=== Supporting ===
- Kim Dong-hee as Baek-Ho

A young employee who works in the communication department with Park Cha-kyung.

- Esom as Nan-yeong

Another spy who is active as a member of the anti-Japanese organization Black Corps.

=== Special appearance ===
- Kim Jong-soo as a projectionist at the Golden Hall theater
- Lee Joo-young a ticket office worker
- Kim Joong-hee as Tadashi
- Kim Hyeong-seo as a new secretary of the Chief of Government Affairs

== Production ==
Principal photography began on January 4, 2021 and ended on May 21.

== Release and reception ==
The film was released on January 18, 2023 on 1099 screens. The opening recorded 41,499 admissions.

As of July 24, 2026, with gross of US$4,624,960 and 682,856 admissions, it is the eighteenth highest-grossing Korean film of 2023.

== Awards and nominations ==
Name of the award ceremony, year presented, category, nominee of the award, and the result of the nomination
Award ceremony	Year	Category	Nominee	Result	Ref.
Bechdel Day	2023	Bechdel Choice 10 — Film	Phantom	Top 10	
Bechdel Day	2023	Bechdelian in Film — Actress of the year	Lee Hanee	Won	
Buil Film Awards	2023	Best Music	Dalpalan	Won	
Buil Film Awards	2023	Art/technical award	Kim Bo-muk	Nominated	
Grand Bell Awards	2023	Best Music	Dalpalan	Won	
Grand Bell Awards	2023	Best Art Direction	Kim Bo-muk	Nominated	
Grand Bell Awards	2023	Best Visual Effects	Heo Myung-haeng	Nominated	
Grand Bell Awards	2023	Best Costume Design	Ham Hyun-joo	Nominated	
