= Insadong Scandal =

- Film poster
- Hangul: 인사동 스캔들
- Hanja: 仁寺洞 스캔들
- RR: Insa-dong seukaendeul
- MR: Insa-dong sŭk'aendŭl
- Directed by: Park Hee-gon
- Written by: Park Hee-gon
- Produced by: Jeon Ho-jin
- Starring: Kim Rae-won; Uhm Jung-hwa
- Cinematography: Choi Sang-ho
- Edited by: Nam Na-yeong
- Music by: Bang Jun-seok
- Release date: April 30, 2009
- Running time: 109 minutes
- Country: South Korea
- Languages: Korean; Japanese
- Box office: US$6,177,474

Insadong Scandal (Korean: 인사동 스캔들; RR: Insa-dong seukaendeul) is a 2009 South Korean heist film directed by Park Hee-gon, starring Kim Rae-won and Uhm Jung-hwa. This film is about a cold-hearted mogul who hires a group of art restoration experts to steal a Joseon dynasty masterpiece.

== Plot ==
A fabled painting from a royal palace is discovered after 400 years. Once properly restored, it could fetch at least $40 million in the international auction market. Bae is the owner of the gallery which possesses the painting. She commissions Lee, a restoration artist, to unveil the painting's true form and purpose.

== Cast ==
- Kim Rae-won ... Lee Kang-jun
- Uhm Jung-hwa ... Bae Tae-jin
- Im Ha-ryong ... Madam Kwon
- Hong Soo-hyun ... Choi Ha-kyeong
- Kim Jung-tae ... Jang Seok-jin
- Kim Byeong-ok ... Officer Kang
- Ma Dong-seok ... Sang-baek
- Oh Jung-se ... Keun-bok
- Ko Chang-seok ... Forgery factory president
