= Ransomed =

- Theatrical release poster
- Hangul: 비공식작전
- Hanja: 非公式作戰
- RR: Bigongsik jakjeon
- MR: Pigongsik chakchŏn
- Directed by: Kim Seong-hun
- Written by: Kim Jeong-yeon; Yeo Mi-jeong
- Produced by: Jeong I-jun; Yeo Mi-jeong
- Starring: Ha Jung-woo; Ju Ji-hoon
- Cinematography: Kim Tae-seong
- Edited by: Kim Chang-ju
- Music by: Mowg
- Production companies: Wind Up Film; Ynot Film
- Distributed by: Showbox
- Release date: August 2, 2023
- Running time: 132 minutes
- Country: South Korea
- Language: Korean
- Box office: US$8.1 million

Ransomed (Korean: 비공식작전; RR: Bigongsik jakjeon) is a 2023 South Korean action thriller film directed by Kim Seong-hun, starring Ha Jung-woo and Ju Ji-hoon. It is based on the 1986 kidnapping of a South Korean diplomat in Lebanon. The film was released theatrically on August 2, 2023. It was also invited at the 28th Busan International Film Festival in 'Korean Cinema Today - Panorama' section and was screened on October 5, 2023.

== Premise ==
Set in 1987, the film revolves around diplomat Lee Min-jun and local taxi driver Kim Pan-su who went to Lebanon to rescue a missing colleague. At the time, the Chun Doo-hwan government was covering it up to avoid bad press for the upcoming 1987 South Korean presidential election and the bid for 1988 Summer Olympics. The ransom asked by the terrorists was 2.5 million U.S. dollars. The public will not know the full details until declassification in 2047.

== Cast ==
- Ha Jung-woo as Lee Min-jun
- Ju Ji-hoon as Kim Pan-su
- Kim Eung-soo as the director of KCIA
- Park Hyuk-kwon as Manager Park
- Kim Jong-soo as South Korean Foreign Affairs Minister Choi Kwang-soo
- Lim Hyung-guk as kidnapped Secretary Oh Jae-seok
- Burn Gorman as Richard Carter
- Marcin Dorociński as Hays Shaito, a Switzerland arbitrator
- Fehd Benchemsi as Karim
- Anas El Baz as Naji
- Nisrine Adam as Lila, Pan-su's lover
- Khalil Oubaaqa As Gangster
- Nada El Belkasmi as Refugee camp volunteer

== Production ==
=== Development ===
Development of the film was delayed by the COVID-19 pandemic. The production had originally been scheduled to begin filming around March 2020, but was postponed. Director Kim Seong-hun later said that he had first been offered the project several years earlier and became interested in the unanswered questions surrounding the kidnapping and subsequent rescue of the diplomat.

=== Filming ===
Although the story is set primarily in Beirut, Lebanon, the film was shot in Morocco. The overseas shoot lasted approximately three months. Production took place during the COVID-19 pandemic, and Morocco permitted the production to enter the country by charter flight despite widespread border restrictions at the time.

== Release ==
The film premiered theatrically in South Korea on August 2, 2023. It was subsequently invited to the 28th Busan International Film Festival, where it screened in the Korean Cinema Today – Panorama section on October 5, 2023.

In Japan, the film was released on September 6, 2024, under the title Ransomed: Unofficial Operation.

== Reception ==
=== Box office ===
According to the Korean Film Council's integrated computer network, the film grossed US$7,470,019 at the local box office and accumulated 1,058,745 admissions from 1,151 screens.

=== Accolades ===
Award	Date of ceremony	Category	Recipient(s)	Result	Ref.
Buil Film Awards	October 5, 2023	Best Cinematography	Kim Tae-Seong	Nominated	
Grand Bell Awards	November 15, 2023	Best Editing	Kim Chang-ju	Nominated	
Grand Bell Awards	November 15, 2023	Best Visual Effects	No Nam-seok	Nominated	
Grand Bell Awards	November 15, 2023	Best Cinematography	Kim Tae-seong	Nominated	
