= The Moon (2023 film) =

2023 South Korean film by Kim Yong-hwa

- Theatrical release poster
- Hangul: 더 문
- RR: Deo mun
- MR: Tŏ mun
- Directed by: Kim Yong-hwa
- Written by: Kim Yong-hwa
- Produced by: Seo Ho-jin; Kim Yong-hwa
- Starring: Sul Kyung-gu; Doh Kyung-soo; Kim Hee-ae
- Cinematography: Kim Young-ho
- Edited by: Jeong Ji-eun
- Music by: Lee Jae-hak
- Production companies: Vlad Studio; CJ Entertainment
- Distributed by: CJ Entertainment
- Release date: August 2, 2023
- Running time: 129 minutes
- Country: South Korea
- Languages: Korean; English
- Budget: US$21.8 million
- Box office: US$5.2 million

The Moon (Korean: 더 문; RR: Deo mun) is a 2023 South Korean science fiction disaster film written, co-produced and directed by Kim Yong-hwa, starring Sul Kyung-gu, Doh Kyung-soo, and Kim Hee-ae. It follows the dramatic story of South Korea's first crewed lunar exploration mission and isolation in space. The film was released theatrically on August 2, 2023. It is also available for streaming on Viu in selected regions.

== Synopsis ==
In the near future, South Korea's first crewed mission to the moon ends in a tragic disaster when an explosion occurs on board. Five years later, a second human spaceflight is launched successfully but a strong solar wind causes it to malfunction. One astronaut, Sun-woo is left stranded in space. Facing another fatal catastrophe, the Naro Space Center turns to its former managing director Kim Jae-guk to help bring Sun-woo back home safely.

== Cast ==
- Sul Kyung-gu as Kim Jae-guk, the former head of the Naro Space Center
- Doh Kyung-soo as Hwang Sun-woo, a space crew member
- Kim Hee-ae as Yoon Moon-young, the director of NASA's Lunar Orbiter and Jae-guk's ex-wife
- Jo Han-chul as Kim In-sik, Minister of Science and ICT
- Park Byung-eun as Jeong Min-gyu, Jae-guk's successor
- Choi Byung-mo as Oh Kyu-seok, Vice Minister of Science and ICT
- Hong Seung-hee as Han-byeol, an intern working with Jae-guk
- Choi Jung-woo as President
- Lee Sung-min as Hwang Kyu-tae
- Kim Rae-won as Lee Sang-won
- Lee Yi-kyung as Cho Yoon-jong
- Park Yoo-ra as Announcer

== Production ==
=== Filming ===
Principal photography began on June 6, 2021, and wrapped in October 2021.

== Awards and nominations ==
Name of the award ceremony, year presented, category, nominee of the award, and the result of the nomination
| Award ceremony | Year | Category | Nominee | Result | Ref. |
|---|---|---|---|---|---|
| Baeksang Arts Awards | 2024 | Technical Award | Jin Jong-hyun (VFX) | Nominated | |
| Blue Dragon Film Awards | 2023 | Best Actor | Doh Kyung-soo | Nominated | |
| Blue Dragon Film Awards | 2023 | Best cinematography and lighting | Kim Young-ho, Hwang Soon-wook | Nominated | |
| Blue Dragon Film Awards | 2023 | Best Technical award | Jin Jong-hyun (VFX) | Won | |
| Buil Film Awards | 2023 | Best Actor | Doh Kyung-soo | Nominated | |
| Buil Film Awards | 2023 | Best Cinematography | Kim Young-ho | Nominated | |
| Buil Film Awards | 2023 | Art/Technical award | Jin Jong-hyun (VFX) | Won | |
| Buil Film Awards | 2023 | Star of the Year Award | Doh Kyung-soo | Won | |
| Grand Bell Awards | 2023 | Best Actor | Doh Kyung-soo | Nominated | |
| Grand Bell Awards | 2023 | Best Art Direction | Hong Ju-hee | Nominated | |
| Grand Bell Awards | 2023 | Best Cinematography | Kim Young-ho | Nominated | |
| Grand Bell Awards | 2023 | Best Visual Effects | Jin Jong-hyun | Nominated | |
| Grand Bell Awards | 2023 | Best Sound | Choi Tae-young | Nominated | |
