= Concrete Utopia =

2023 South Korean disaster-thriller film

- Theatrical release poster
- Hangul: 콘크리트 유토피아
- RR: Konkeuriteu yutopia
- MR: K'onk'ŭrit'ŭ yut'op'ia
- Directed by: Um Tae-hwa
- Screenplay by: Um Tae-hwa; Lee Shin-ji
- Based on: Pleasant Bullying by Kim Sungnyung
- Produced by: Byun Seung-min
- Starring: Lee Byung-hun; Park Seo-joon; Park Bo-young; Kim Sun-young; Park Ji-hu; Kim Do-yoon
- Cinematography: Cho Hyoung-rae
- Edited by: Han Mee-yeon
- Music by: Kim Hae-won
- Production companies: Climax Studio; BH Entertainment
- Distributed by: Lotte Entertainment
- Release date: August 9, 2023
- Running time: 130 minutes
- Country: South Korea
- Language: Korean
- Box office: US$30.1 million

Concrete Utopia (Korean: 콘크리트 유토피아) is a 2023 South Korean disaster-thriller film directed by Um Tae-hwa, who wrote the screenplay with Lee Shin-ji, based on the second part of the webtoon Pleasant Outcast by Kim Soongnyung. It stars Lee Byung-hun, Park Seo-joon, Park Bo-young, Kim Sun-young, Park Ji-hu, and Kim Do-yoon.

Concrete Utopia is set in Seoul shortly after a titanic earthquake destroys the city, and follows the residents of a building that miraculously remained intact. As they try to survive, they are faced with harsh realities and difficult moral decisions. The film was theatrically released on August 9, 2023.

The film received generally positive reviews from critics and was selected as the South Korean entry for the Best International Feature Film category for the 96th Academy Awards. However, it did not make it to the shortlist. A standalone sequel titled Badland Hunters, following a different set of characters evolving in post-earthquake Seoul, was released in January 2024, with producer Byun Seung-min as the only returning key crew member.

== Plot ==
During 1970s Seoul, apartment construction is booming, technology advances, house sizes expand, and prices skyrocket into billions of won. By December 2023, the city is covered in concrete high-rises, but an unprecedented cold wave and a massive earthquake destroy nearly everything. Amid the ruins, only one building remains standing: Hwang Gung (Imperial Palace) Apartments, where Min-sung wakes up to find Seoul reduced to gray dust and rubble.

Inside the surviving apartment, Min-sung and his wife, Myung-hwa, try to adapt. With no power, water, or communication, residents panic while following useless emergency manuals. That night, a mother and child from the neighboring collapsed apartment beg for shelter. Though Min-sung hesitates, Myung-hwa's compassion wins, and they take the pair in. The next day, Min-sung experiences the breakdown of morality as residents begin bartering for goods. Tensions rise when outsiders occupying vacant units refuse to leave upon the return of residents, leading to a violent confrontation and arson. A fire breaks out, and a man named Young-tak bravely extinguishes it, earning admiration and, eventually, election as the new resident leader.

Under Young-tak's command, the residents vote to expel all outsiders, justifying it as necessary for survival. The outsiders resist, sparking a brutal clash at the apartment gates that ends with Young-tak's bloody but triumphant defense. Soon, the apartment is reorganized into a seemingly utopian community with strict rules, labor-based food distribution, and security patrols. But unity masks cruelty. Patrols plunder nearby shops for supplies, mercilessly beating survivors, and begin calling outsiders "cockroaches". Myung-hwa discovers that some residents, including one named Do-kyun, secretly hide refugees inside. Meanwhile, a woman named Hye-won, a former resident who survived outside, returns. Her arrival unsettles Young-tak.

As the community celebrates its stability, the truth about Young-tak unravels. In reality, he is a taxi driver who had been scammed while trying to buy an apartment in Hwang Gung. On the day of the earthquake, he confronted the real Young-tak and accidentally killed him during a fight. When the disaster struck, he assumed the dead man's identity to survive. His secret festers beneath the residents' growing fanaticism. When Myung-hwa and Hye-won uncover the real Young-tak's corpse hidden in his old unit, they expose the impostor before everyone, shattering the illusion of order.

The revelation plunges the apartment into chaos. Young-tak kills Hye-won in a fit of rage, but before he can reassert control, the building is attacked by organized outsiders. A violent battle erupts, and explosions tear through the complex. Many residents die, including Young-tak, who crawls back to his unit and dies clutching a family photo. Min-sung and Myung-hwa escape the collapsing building as rain begins to fall over the shattered city.

Wandering through the devastated landscape, Min-sung and Myung-hwa find refuge in a ruined church. There, Min-sung gives Myung-hwa a hairpin, a remnant from their scavenging trip, and quietly dies from wounds he sustained during the night. Myung-hwa buries him with the help of other survivors, who invite her to join their community in a collapsed apartment building.

== Cast ==
- Lee Byung-hun as Yeong-tak (room 902)

Interim resident leader of Imperial Palace Apartments. With his decisiveness and ability to act in a crisis situation, he is a leader who does not hesitate to take risks to protect the apartments from outsiders.

- Park Seo-joon as Min-sung (room 602)

A civil servant who majored in public administration and met his wife, Myeong-hwa, on a blind date as a college student. After being noticed by Yeong-tak and selected as a security guard, his skills are recognized, and he became the leader's assistant.

- Park Bo-young as Myeong-hwa (room 602)

Min-sung's wife, who is a nurse with a warm personality and strength. She calmly cares for the injured even in extreme situations.

- Kim Sun-young as Geum-ae (room 1207)

President of the women's association of Imperial Palace Apartments

- Park Ji-hu as Hye-won (room 903)

A high school student survivor

- Kim Do-yoon as Do-gyun (room 809)

A resident who initially appears to be uncooperative but is actually a person of upright character who sticks to his beliefs even among people who are becoming corrupted.

- Uhm Tae-goo as a homeless man

One of the homeless people moving in groups outside Imperial Palace Apartments

- Lee Seon-hee as Ju-mong's mother
- Oh Hee-joon as homeless man
- Joo In-young as Kim Po-daek

== Production ==
=== Casting ===
On August 4, 2020, Lotte Entertainment announced a disaster thriller film with Um Tae-hwa as director and Lee Byung-hun and Park Bo-young in pivotal roles. Park Seo-joon was also set to star, in a film based on the webtoon Pleasant Bullying, by Kim Soongnyung. Park Ji-hu and Kim Do-yoon joined the cast in April 2021.

The film is directed by Um Tae-hwa and produced by Climax Studio, and co-produced by BH Entertainment. It is distributed by Lotte Entertainment, who also work as international sales agents for the production. The film's score is composed by Kim Hae-won, while Cho Hyoung-rae is the cinematographer.

=== Filming ===
Principal photography began on April 16, 2021, and wrapped up at the end of August.

== Release ==
The film was theatrically released on August 9, 2023, and was screened at the 2023 Toronto International Film Festival in the Gala section on September 9 for the press and on September 10 for the public. It was invited to the Òrbita competition section of the 56th Sitges International Film Festival and screened on October 12. It also screened in the Spotlight on Korea section at the Hawaii International Film Festival, on October 18, 2023. It closed the 2023 London East Asia Film Festival on October 29, 2023. It was also selected at the 54th International Film Festival of India, in the Kaleidoscope section, and screened on November 23 and 26. A few days later, it was selected in the Cinema International section of the 29th Kolkata International Film Festival and was screened on December 7, 2023.

Concrete Utopia was pre-sold in 152 countries in Europe, Asia, and South America.

=== Home media ===
The film will be released in North America through Viki in the first quarter of 2024.

== Reception ==
=== Box office ===
Concrete Utopia was released on August 9 on 1,621 screens. It opened in first place at the Korean box-office, with 231,015 admissions, and surpassed one million viewers on August 12, four days after its release. It registered another million in the next three days, thus surpassing two million viewers in seven days, on August 15. The three-million mark was achieved on August 24, the 16th day of its release.

As of 26 December 2023, it is the fourth highest-grossing Korean film of 2023, at US$28,901,354 in revenues and 3,849,242 admissions.

=== Critical response ===
On the review aggregator Rotten Tomatoes, the film has an approval rating of 100%, based on 61 reviews, with an average rating of 7.3/10.

Choi Jeong-ah, writing for Sports World, praised Lee Byung-hun's acting, stating, "this movie is a comprehensive gift set for Lee Byung-hun's acting" and adding the film was "more creepy than most horror movies". John Lui, reviewing for The Straits Times, graded the film with three stars out of five and wrote, "Concrete Utopia unravels slightly at the end, but is mostly a darkly funny take on Nimby-ism as a force so powerful it will survive the ending of the world." Casey Chong of Fiction Horizon rated the film eight out of ten and described it as "An intriguing disaster movie that skilfully blends black comedy and psychological thriller". Praising the performances of the lead cast, especially Lee Byung-hun, he wrote, "Lee's chameleon-like acting is no doubt one of the best performances I've ever seen in his illustrious career." He also commended Tae-Hwa's "confident pacing and crafty direction". Concluding, he opined that the film is "cliched and oft-told as a disaster movie, still it can overcome its familiarity by giving it a thought-provoking twist with relatable themes, intriguing storytelling, and solid acting."

Allan Hunter for ScreenDaily wrote a positive review, stating, "A slick, inventive blend of jeopardy, violence and black comedy gains further appeal from the echoes of J. G. Ballard's High-Rise and elements of biting satire in the style of Triangle of Sadness." Alex Hudson, writing for Exclaim!, described the film as "a canny allegory about the haves and the have-nots". He graded the film 7/10. Anna Miller, with Next Best Picture, graded the film 8/10 and wrote, "Concrete Utopia is a gripping, disturbing, and powerful representation of the worst of society, yet equally showcasing the best qualities in humans and how hope, community, and decency will always exist through the dust and devastation."

=== Accolades ===
Concrete Utopia has won 14 awards, including two for best film, as of 24 November 2023.

Award ceremony	Year	Category	Nominee	Result	Ref.
Asian Film Awards	2024	Best Production Design	Cho Hwa-sung	Nominated	
Asian Film Awards	2024	Best Visual Effects	Eun Jae-hyun	Nominated	
Asian Film Awards	2024	Best Sound	Kim Suk-won and Kim Eun-jung	Nominated	
Astra Film Awards	2024	Best International Feature	Concrete Utopia	Nominated	
Baeksang Arts Awards	2024	Best Film	Concrete Utopia	Nominated	
Baeksang Arts Awards	2024	Best Director	Um Tae-hwa	Nominated	
Baeksang Arts Awards	2024	Best Actor	Lee Byung-hun	Nominated	
Baeksang Arts Awards	2024	Best Supporting Actress	Kim Sun-young	Nominated	
Blue Dragon Film Awards	2023	Best Film	Concrete Utopia	Nominated	
Blue Dragon Film Awards	2023	Best Director	Um Tae-hwa	Won	
Blue Dragon Film Awards	2023	Best Actor	Lee Byung-hun	Won	
Blue Dragon Film Awards	2023	Best Actress	Park Bo-young	Nominated	
Blue Dragon Film Awards	2023	Popular Star Award	Park Bo-young	Won	
Blue Dragon Film Awards	2023	Best Supporting Actress	Kim Sun-young	Nominated	
Blue Dragon Film Awards	2023	Best Screenplay	Um Tae-hwa	Nominated	
Blue Dragon Film Awards	2023	Best Music	Kim Hae-won	Nominated	
Blue Dragon Film Awards	2023	Best Editor	Han Mi-yeon	Nominated	
Blue Dragon Film Awards	2023	Best Art Direction	Cho Hwa-sung	Nominated	
Blue Dragon Film Awards	2023	Best Lighting	Cho Hyung-rae	Nominated	
Blue Dragon Film Awards	2023	Best Technical Award	Eun Jae-hyeon	Nominated	
Buil Film Awards	2023	Best Film	Concrete Utopia	Won	
Buil Film Awards	2023	Best Director	Um Tae-hwa	Nominated	
Buil Film Awards	2023	Best Actor	Lee Byung-hun	Won	
Buil Film Awards	2023	Best Supporting Actress	Kim Sun-young	Nominated	
Buil Film Awards	2023	Best Screenplay	Um Tae-hwa	Nominated	
Buil Film Awards	2023	Best Cinematography	Cho Hyung-rae	Won	
Buil Film Awards	2023	Best Art Award	Cho Hwa-sung	Nominated	
Buil Film Awards	2023	Best Music	Kim Hae-won	Nominated	
Buil Film Awards	2023	Star of the Year Award (Female)	Park Bo-young	Won	
Chunsa Film Art Awards	2023	Best Director	Um Tae-hwa	Nominated	
Chunsa Film Art Awards	2023	Best Actor	Lee Byung-hun	Nominated	
Grand Bell Awards	2023	Best Film	Concrete Utopia	Won	
Grand Bell Awards	2023	Best Director	Um Tae-hwa	Nominated	
Grand Bell Awards	2023	Best Actor	Lee Byung-hun	Won	
Grand Bell Awards	2023	Best Supporting Actress	Kim Sun-young	Won	
Grand Bell Awards	2023	Best Screenplay	Um Tae-hwa	Nominated	
Grand Bell Awards	2023	Best Cinematography	Cho Hyung-rae	Nominated	
Grand Bell Awards	2023	Best Music	Kim Hae-won	Nominated	
Grand Bell Awards	2023	Best Editor	Han Mi-yeon	Nominated	
Grand Bell Awards	2023	Best Visual Effects Award (VFX)	Eun Jae-hyeon	Won	
Grand Bell Awards	2023	Best Art Award	Cho Hwa-sung, Choi Hyun-seok	Won	
Grand Bell Awards	2023	Best Sound Effect Award	Kim Seok-won	Won	
Fancine	2023	Best feature film	Concrete Utopia	Won	
London East Asia Film Festival	2023	Best Actress	Park Bo-young	Won	
National Film Awards UK	2026	Best Foreign Language Film	Concrete Utopia	Nominated	

== Sequel ==
A sequel to Concrete Utopia, titled Badland Hunters, began production on November 14, 2021. It is the first feature film by martial arts director Huh Myung-haeng and features Ma Dong-seok, Lee Hee-joon, Lee Jun-young, and Roh Jeong-eui in the lead roles. It was released on Netflix on January 26, 2024.

== See also ==
- List of submissions to the 96th Academy Awards for Best International Feature Film
- List of South Korean submissions for the Academy Award for Best International Feature Film
