= Don't Buy the Seller =

- Theatrical release poster
- Hangul: 타겟
- Lit.: Target
- RR: Taget
- MR: T'aget
- Directed by: Park Hee-gon
- Written by: Park Hee-gon; Kim Dong-hoo
- Produced by: Cho Byeong-yeon
- Starring: Shin Hye-sun; Kim Sung-kyun
- Cinematography: Baek Yoon-seok; Lee Seon-yong
- Edited by: Han Eon-jae; Han Young-gyu
- Music by: Jang Young-gyu
- Production company: Fiona Films
- Distributed by: Megabox Plus M
- Release date: August 30, 2023
- Running time: 101 minutes
- Country: South Korea
- Language: Korean
- Box office: US$3 million

Don't Buy the Seller (Korean: 타겟; RR: Taget; lit. Target) is a 2023 South Korean crime thriller film co-written and directed by Park Hee-gon, starring Shin Hye-sun and Kim Sung-kyun. In the film, suspense unfolds in the daily life of Soo-hyun, who becomes a target of crime through second-hand trading. It was released theatrically on August 30, 2023.

== Plot ==
Ordinary office worker Su-hyun buys a washing machine through a second-hand transaction after moving to a new place, only to realize that the machine is broken and she's been scammed. Determined not to let it slide, Su-hyun tracks down the elusive seller and starts leaving comments on all their posts, exposing them as a fraud and disrupting their deals.

From that day on, eerie incidents begin to plague Su-hyun: mysterious phone calls, food deliveries she never ordered, and strange men showing up at her doorstep in the middle of the night. Her personal information has been completely leaked, and unsettling traces of intruders appear throughout her home, gradually dismantling her daily life. As an official investigation gets underway, Su-hyun, accompanied by Detective Joo, visits the seller's home, only to discover a dead body there.

== Cast ==
- Shin Hye-sun as Jang Su-hyun
- Kim Sung-kyun as Joo Cheol-ho
- Im Chul-soo as Director Kim
- Lee Joo-young as Oh Dal-ja
- Keum Sae-rok as Hye-jin
- Choi Jae-sup as Foreman
- Noh Young-hak as college student
- Kang Tae-oh as Na Seung-hyun

== Production ==
=== Development ===
Director Park Hee-gon said that the film was inspired by real-life cases involving victims of second-hand trading scams. He said that he became interested in adapting the subject after encountering accounts of people who had suffered serious harassment following online transactions. Park incorporated elements from multiple real-life incidents into the fictional story.

=== Filming ===
Principal photography began in July 2021 and ended in October 2021.

== Release ==
Don't Buy the Seller was released theatrically in South Korea on August 30, 2023 and was distributed by Plus M Entertainment.

== Reception ==
=== Box office ===
According to the Korean Film Council's integrated computer network, Don't Buy the Seller has grossed $3 million with a running total of 424,916 tickets sold.

=== Critical response ===
Im Soo-yeon of Cine21 gave the film 5/10, noting its use of fears associated with the digital era while questioning the novelty of its approach.
