= The Point Men (2023 film) =

South Korean action crime thriller film

- Theatrical release poster
- Hangul: 교섭
- Hanja: 交涉
- RR: Gyoseop
- MR: Kyosŏp
- Directed by: Yim Soon-rye
- Written by: Ahn Yeong-su
- Produced by: Shin Bum-Soo; Nam Jeong-il
- Starring: Hwang Jung-min; Hyun Bin; Kang Ki-young
- Cinematography: Lee Seung-hun
- Edited by: Kim Sun-min
- Music by: Jeong Hyeon-su
- Production companies: Watermelon Pictures Co.; One Take Film
- Distributed by: Megabox Plus M
- Release date: January 18, 2023 (South Korea)
- Country: South Korea
- Language: Korean
- Box office: US$13.5 million

The Point Men (Korean: 교섭; RR: Gyoseop; lit. 'Bargaining') is a 2023 South Korean action thriller film directed by Yim Soon-rye and starring Hwang Jung-min, Hyun Bin, and Kang Ki-young. The film is based on the 2007 South Korean hostage crisis in Afghanistan and the subsequent rescue mission. It was released on January 18, 2023, in South Korea and screened in Dolby Atmos.

== Premise ==
A story about a diplomat and a National Intelligence Service (NIS) agent who struggle and risk their lives on foreign soil to save Korean hostages that have been abducted in Afghanistan. The film is based on true events of 2007 South Korean hostage crisis in Afghanistan, when 23 South Korean missionaries were captured and held hostage in Afghanistan. Hyun Bin playing a NIS agent conducts a rescue operation and negotiations with the help of diplomat played by Hwang Jung-min.

== Cast ==
- Hwang Jung-min as Jung Jae-ho, diplomat
- Hyun Bin as Park Dae-sik, NIS agent
- Kang Ki-young as Qasim / Lee Bong-han
- Jung Jae-sung as Vice Minister Kim
- Kwon Hyuk as Secretary
- Baek Joo-hee as Debate program pd
- Bryan Larkin as Abdula
- Jeon Sung-woo as Secretary Cha
- Fahim Fazli Taliban leader
- Lee Seung-chul as Minister Choi
- Iyad Hajjaj as Minister of Foreign Affairs of Afghanistan
- Ahn Chang-hwan as Sim Bo-jung
- Park Hyung-soo as Park Jeon-ryak

== Production ==
The film inspired by a true story of 23 South Korean Christian volunteers taken hostage by Taliban militants in Afghanistan in 2007, was to commence its filming in late March 2020, in Jordan, but due to the COVID-19 outbreak the shooting was postponed. After normalisation principal photography began in late April 2020. The actors and production team flew in July for Jordan schedule of filming. The shooting at Jordan was wrapped up in September 2020.

== Release ==
The film was originally slated to be released in September 2022, but was postponed due to aftermath of COVID-19 and busy schedule of lead actors. In December 2022, with the release of trailer the theatrical release date of the film was announced for January 18, 2023. After the domestic release, the film is slated to release in North America on January 27, in Hong Kong and Macau on February 2, in Taiwan on February 3, in Philippines on February 8, in Cambodia on March 3, and in Thailand on March 23. The film was released in select theaters in the United States and Canada on January 27, 2023, by 815 Pictures.

== Reception ==
=== Box office ===
The film was released on January 18, 2023, on 1289 screens. It opened at 1st place at the Korean box office with 104,798 admissions. The film topped the weekly collection on Korean box office for the week January 16 – 22 by collecting US$5,478,201 and 659,022 viewers. The film surpassed 1 million viewers in 7 days of its release. It recorded 1,023,232 cumulative audience on January 24.

As of February 22, 2023, with gross of US$13,471,119 and 1,721,111 admissions, it is the second highest-grossing Korean film of 2023.

=== Critical response ===
Lee Da-won of Cine21 reviewing the film praised the performances of Hwang Jung-min and Hyun Bin, writing, "Thanks to the stable breathing of the two people, the attraction of the movie increases even more." Lee opined that though director Im Soon-rye's narration is "as expected neat and clear", but "the lack of catharsis in the 'narrative of defeating evil and rescuing the weak' is a major weakness that does not ensure the success of the film". Han Hyeon-jeong reviewing for Maeil Economy wrote that "there is little catharsis even in the more perfect coordination of the two perfect protagonists." Han liked the climax and Kang Ki-young's energy but felt film was "insipid". In conclusion, she wrote that "I don't think I'd like to recommend it to someone or experience it again."

== Awards and nominations ==
Name of the award ceremony, year presented, category, nominee of the award, and the result of the nomination
Award ceremony	Year	Category	Nominee / Work	Result	Ref.
Baeksang Arts Awards	2023	Best Supporting Actor – Film	Kang Ki-young	Nominated	
Buil Film Awards	2023	Best Director	Yim Soon-rye	Nominated	
Buil Film Awards	2023	Best Supporting Actor	Kang Ki-young	Nominated	
Monterrey International Film Festival	2023	Achievement Award	Yim Soon-rye	Won	
Grand Bell Awards	2023	Best Director	Yim Soon-rye	Nominated	
Grand Bell Awards	2023	Best Supporting Actor	Kang Ki-young	Nominated	
