= Kim Sun-young (actress, born 1976) =

South Korean actress (born 1976)

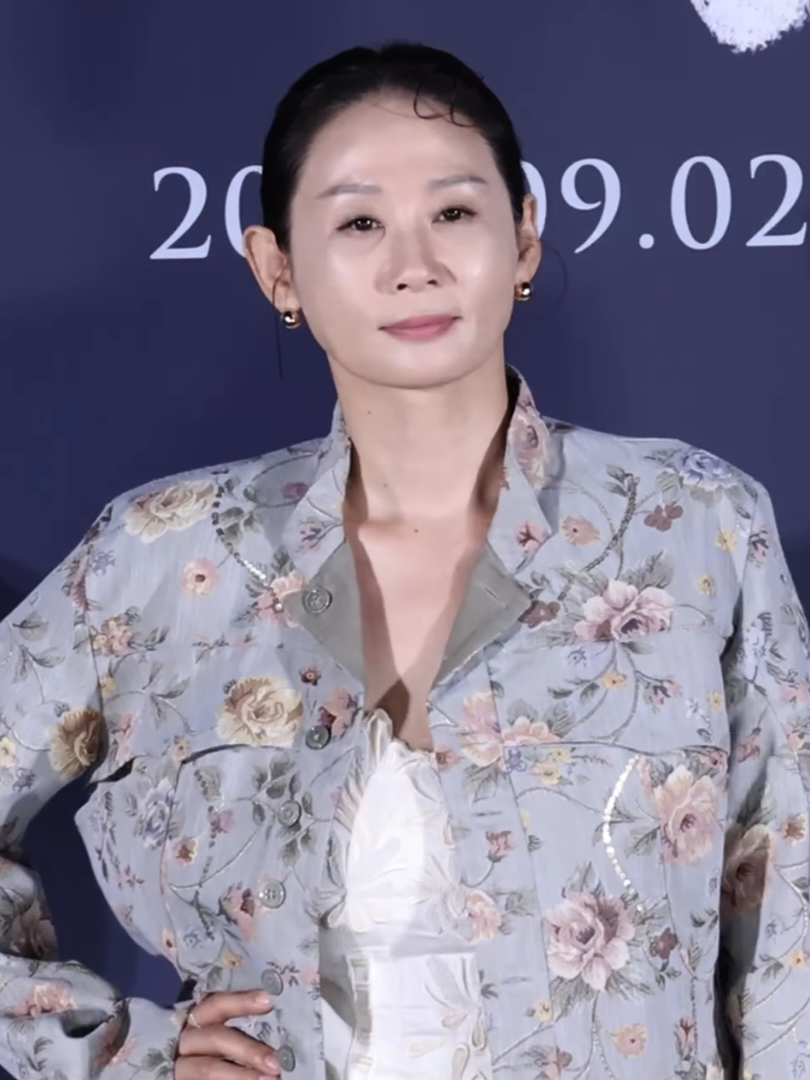
- Kim in August 2026
- Born: April 10, 1976 (age 50); North Gyeongsang Province, South Korea
- Occupation: Actress
- Years active: 1995–present
- Agent: Kang Entertainment
- Spouse: Lee Seung-won
- Children: 1

Korean name
- Hangul: 김선영
- Hanja: 金善映
- RR: Gim Seonyeong
- MR: Kim Sŏnyŏng

Kim Sun-young (Korean: 김선영; born April 10, 1976) is a South Korean actress. She has performed in a variety of popular dramas, including Reply 1988 (2015), Because This is My First Life (2018), Romance is a Bonus Book (2019), When the Camellia Blooms (2019), Vagabond (2019), Crash Landing On You (2019), and Backstreet Rookie (2020). She won the Best Supporting Actress award at the Chunsa Film Art Awards and Wildflower Film Awards for her performance in Communications and Lies. Kim has received the Best Supporting Actress Award at the 56th Baeksang Arts Awards for her role on Crash Landing On You.

== Early life ==
Kim was born in educators family on April 10, 1976, in Yeongdeok-gun, Gyeongsangbuk-do. From 1992 to 1995 She attended Yeongdeok Girls' High School. She fell in love of acting there. From 1995 to 1999 She Studied Philosophy at Hallym University. Kim started acting while on the theater stage in college.

== Career ==
Kim debuted as a theatre actor in 1995 in the play After the Play is Over. From 1999 to 2005 Kim was member of The Little Mythical Troupe. Though she debuted in films in 2005 with She's on Duty, her television debut was in 2014 with a minor role in the MBC drama series Hotel King.

Kim drew attention by showing her impressive acting skills in the film Ode to My Father in 2014. Kim played the role of a market lady who fights with Young-ja (Kim Yun-jin), and her realistic acting as if she had recruited a real merchant made her a mark on many people's eyes. Kim's natural appearance and her acting ability, made her shine.

Also in 2014, she appeared in 2014 Drama Festival Shine or Go Crazy.

Since 2014, Kim founded her own troupe Nabe Theater Company.

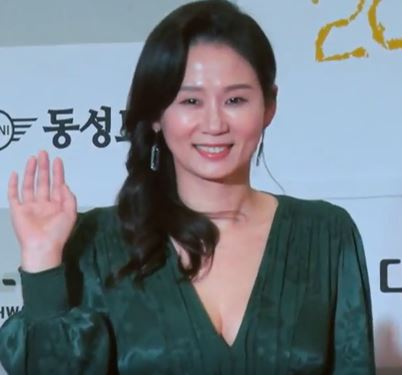
Kim at the 27th Buil Film Awards in 2018

In 2015, she played the role of Sunwoo's mother, the youngest of the three local women, in the tvN drama Reply 1988. Kim Seon-young said, "Director Shin Won-ho of 'Reply' saw me in 'Ode to My Father' and thought that I was a local woman. At that time, he kept his eyes on me and asked me to meet him. We met twice and were cast."

Ambassador for the 5th Yedang International Theater Festival in 2017.

In 2021, Kim starred in film Three Sisters as Jeon Hee-suk.

Kim starred in role Hye-jeong of film Dream Palace, who found her new home with her husband's industrial accident settlement, faces her bare face hidden by her unsold apartment.

== Personal life ==
Kim and director Lee Seung-won first crossed paths while working on the film Contradiction, where Kim was one of the lead actresses and Lee was the director. Eventually, they tied the knot, with Kim being four years older than Lee. Lee has two daughters from his previous marriage. From their marriage, Kim and Lee have a daughter.

== Filmography ==
=== Film ===
Year	Title	Role	Notes	Ref.
2005	She's on Duty	Math Teacher		
2006	Ice Bar	Choonja		
2008	Land of Scarecrows	Jang Ji-Young		
2012	Tone-deaf Clinic	Lee Hyung-ja		
2014	Another Promise	Lee Ok-yeon		
2014	Monster	Middle aged woman		
2014	Ode to My Father	Lee sisters		
2015	Enemies In-Law	Teacher		
2015	The Long Way Home	Old Lady		
2015	Communication and Lies	Kim Sun-young		
2016	Missing	Kim Sun-young		
2017	One Line	Assistant Manager Hong		
2018	Herstory	President Shin		
2018	Miss Baek	Jang Hu-nam		
2019	Mal-Mo-E: The Secret Mission	Goo Ja-young		
2019	Trade Your Love	Jo Soo-jeong		
2020	The Day I Died: Unclosed Case	Min-jeong		
2021	Three Sisters	Hee-sook		
2022	Return to Seoul	Freddie's biological aunt		
2022	Broker	Wife of Kindergarten Director	Special appearance	
2022	Life Is Beautiful	Jong-ah		
2023	Dream Palace	Hye-jeong	Premiere at BIFF	
2023	Concrete Utopia	Geum-ae		
2023	Love Reset	Sook-jeong		
2024	Exhuma	Oh Gwang-shim		
2026	Portrait of a Family	Hwang Ji-sook		

=== Television series ===
Year	Title	Role	Notes	Ref.
2014	Hotel King	So Moon-jung		
2014	Flower Grandpa Investigation Unit	Joon-hyuk's mother		
2014	The Three Musketeers	Park Dal-hyang's mother		
2014	Drama Festival: "Fitting"	Yong-ae		
2015	Shine or Go Crazy	Baek Myo		
2015–2016	Reply 1988	Kim Sun-young		
2016	My Horrible Boss	Han Young-mi		
2016	Shopping King Louie	Heo Jung-ran		
2016–2017	Father, I'll Take Care of You	Seo Hye-joo		
2016–2017	The Legend of the Blue Sea	jjimjilbang customer	Cameo (Ep. 11)	
2017	The Guardians	Lee Sun-ae		
2017	Hospital Ship	Oh Mi-jung		
2017	Girls' Generation 1979	Jung-hee's mother		
2017	Because This Is My First Life	Kim Hyun-ja		
2017	Prison Playbook	Kang Chul-doo's ex-wife	Cameo (Ep. 13)	
2018	My First Love	Shin-woo's mother		
2018	Just Dance	Park Shi-young		
2019	Romance Is a Bonus Book	Seo Young-ah		
2019	Her Private Life	Uhm So-hye		
2019	At Eighteen	Soon Song-hee		
2019	When the Camellia Blooms	Park Chan-sook		
2019	Vagabond	Gye Sun-ja		
2019–2020	Crash Landing on You	Na Wol-sook		
2020	Kkondae Intern	Koo Ja-sook		
2020	Hospital Playlist	Ik-joon's patient	Cameo (Ep. 7)	
2020	Backstreet Rookie	Gong Boon-hee		
2020–2021	Homemade Love Story	Lee Man-jung		
2023	Crash Course in Romance	Bang Su-ah's mother		
2023	My Lovely Liar	Choi Ji-hye	Cameo (Ep. 1)	
2023	Queen Maker	Kim Hwa-soo		
2024	Queen of Divorce	Son Jang-mi		
2024	No Gain No Love	Eom So-hye	Cameo (Ep.6)	
2024	A Virtuous Business	Seo Young-bok		
2025	The Trauma Code: Heroes on Call	Kang Myeong-hui		
2025	Our Unwritten Seoul	Yeom Boon-hong		
2025	The Price of Confession	Walsun		
	Love, Take Two	Kim Sun-young		

=== Web series ===
Year	Title	Role	Ref.
2021	The Silent Sea	Dr. Hong Ga-young	
2022	Stock Struck	Jeong Haeng-ja	
2023	Queenmaker	Kim Hwa-soo	
2023	Doona!	Doo-na's mother	

=== Television show ===
Year	Title		Role	Ref.
Year	English	Korean	Role	Ref.
2024	Actors' Association	배우반상회	Cast member	
2025–2026	Reply 1988 10th Anniversary	응답하라 1988 10주년	Cast member	

=== Music video appearances ===
Year	Title	Ref.
2025	"Don't Worry Dear"	

== Theater ==
=== Musical ===
Year	Title		Role	Venue	Date	Ref.
Year	English	Korean	Role	Venue	Date	Ref.
2009	The Story of Notre Dame de Paris	더 스토리 오브 노틀담 드 파리	Creepy	Gwacheon Civic Centre Grand Theatre	October 9–10	
2009	The Story of Notre Dame de Paris	더 스토리 오브 노틀담 드 파리	Creepy	Yeongdeungpo Art Hall	October 13	
2009	The Story of Notre Dame de Paris	더 스토리 오브 노틀담 드 파리	Creepy	Incheon Culture and Arts Centre Grand Performance Hall	November 12–13	
2010	The Story of Notre Dame de Paris	더 스토리 오브 노틀담 드 파리	Creepy	Yongin Lifelong Learning Center Grand Courtyard	January 29–30	
2010	The Story of Notre Dame de Paris	더 스토리 오브 노틀담 드 파리	Creepy	Seoul Open Theatre Changdong	February 5–6	

=== Plays ===
Year	Title		Role	Venue	Date	Ref.
Year	English	Korean	Role	Venue	Date	Ref.
2007	Line	라인	Molly	Hanyang Repertory Theatre	April 20 – June 3	
2007	There is No Future	미래는 없다	Park Eun-ji	Yeonwoo Small Theatre (Daehak-ro)	September 22 – October 7	
2008	Gilgok-myeon, Changnyeong-gun, Gyeongsangnam-do	경남 창녕군 길곡면	Lee Sun-mi	Yeonwoo Small Theatre (Daehak-ro)	September 3–28	
2009	Gilgok-myeon, Changnyeong-gun, Gyeongsangnam-do	경남 창녕군 길곡면	Lee Sun-mi	Daehak-ro Arts Theatre Small Theatre	February 25 – March 8	
2009	Hello Moscow	안녕, 모스크바	Professional	Arko City Grand Theatre	April 17–30	
2010	Beauty Queen	뷰티퀸	Maurin	Doosan Art Centre Space111	January 14 – February 28	
2010	The Best Play 3 - Gilgok-myeon, Changnyeong-gun, Gyeongsangnam-do	연극열전3 - 경남 창녕군 길곡면	Sun-mi (wife)	Dongsung Art Centre Small Theatre	July 30 – September 19	
2012	Jeon Myung-chul Pyeongjeon	전명출 평전	Lee Soon-nim	Namsan Arts Centre Drama Centre	July 10–29	
2012	The Story of Two Detectives	제작자로 나선다	Producer	Blue Moon Theatre in Daehak-ro	September 29to October 9.	
2013	Sacti in the Pocket	주머니 속 선인장		Daehak-ro Installation Theatre Jeongmiso	May 29 – June 16	
2014	Late Blooming Flowers	늦게 핀 꽃	Duchess	Cheongwoon Arts Theatre (Old Globe Theatre)	February 12–16	
2014	Moral Family	모럴 패밀리	Jae-jak			
2014	Mr. Hongjun is a Pharaoh	홍준씨는 파라오다		Lee Hae-rang Arts Theatre	October 19–25	
2017	Moral Family	모럴 패밀리	Jae-jak	Peace Kiss in Seongbuk-gu	October 7 to November 5	
2017–2018	Gilgok-myeon, Changnyeong-gun, Gyeongsangnam-do	경남 창녕군 길곡면	Sun-mi	Dongsung Art Centre Kodoo Small Theatre	December 15 – January 21	
2018	Moral Family	모럴 패밀리	Jae-jak	Daehak-ro Dream Art Centre 4	March 1 – April 1	
2018	Doosan Humanities Theater 2018 Altruism - Nassim	두산인문극장 2018 이타주의자 - 낫심		Doosan Art Center Space111	April 10–29	
2023	Etude	에뛰드	Produce	Hyehwa Art Space	March 17 to 26	
2023	Moral Family	모럴 패밀리	Jae-jak	Daehakro Small Theater Hyehwadang	December 20 to 31	

== Discography ==
=== Soundtrack appearances ===
List of soundtrack appearances, showing year released, and name of the album
Title	Year	Album
"Don't Worry Dear (걱정말아요 그대)" (Stray Dogs featuring Kim Sun-young)	2025	Reply 1988 10th Anniversary OST

== Accolades ==
=== Awards and nominations ===
Name of the award ceremony, year presented, category, nominee of the award, and the result of the nomination
Award ceremony	Year	Category	Nominee / Work	Result	Ref.
APAN Star Awards	2016	Acting Award, Actress	Reply 1988	Nominated	
APAN Star Awards	2021	Best Supporting Actress	Crash Landing on You, Backstreet Rookie	Won	
Asian Film Festival	2023	Best Actress	Dream Palace	Won	
Baeksang Arts Awards	2020	Best Supporting Actress – Television	Crash Landing on You	Won	
Baeksang Arts Awards	2021	Best Supporting Actress – Film	Three Sisters	Won	
Baeksang Arts Awards	2024	Best Supporting Actress – Film	Concrete Utopia	Nominated	
Blue Dragon Film Awards	2018	Best Supporting Actress	Herstory	Nominated	
Blue Dragon Film Awards	2021	Best Supporting Actress	Three Sisters	Won	
Blue Dragon Film Awards	2023	Best Supporting Actress	Concrete Utopia	Nominated	
Brand Customer Loyalty Award	2021	Female actress (scene stealer)	Kim Sun-young	Won	
Buil Film Awards	2018	Best Supporting Actress	Herstory	Won	
Buil Film Awards	2021	Best Supporting Actress	Three Sisters	Won	
Buil Film Awards	2023	Best Supporting Actress	Concrete Utopia	Nominated	
Busan Film Critics Awards	2021	Best Actress	Three Sisters	Won	
Chunsa Film Art Awards	2018	Best Supporting Actress	Communication & Lies	Won	
Chunsa Film Art Awards	2019	Best Supporting Actress	Herstory	Nominated	
Chunsa Film Art Awards	2021	Best Supporting Actress	Three Sisters	Nominated	
Director's Cut Awards	2024	Best Actress	Concrete Utopia	Won	
Golden Cinematography Awards	2019	Best Supporting Actress	Mal-Mo-E: The Secret Mission	Won	
Grand Bell Awards	2018	Best Supporting Actress	Herstory	Nominated	
Grand Bell Awards	2023	Best Supporting Actress	Concrete Utopia	Won	
Grand Bell Awards	2023	Best Actress	Dream Palace	Nominated	
KBS Drama Awards	2017	Best Supporting Actress	Girls' Generation 1979	Nominated	
KBS Drama Awards	2019	Best Supporting Actress	When the Camellia Blooms	Nominated	
KBS Drama Awards	2020	Best Supporting Actress	Homemade Love Story	Won	
Korean Association of Film Critics Awards	2021	Best Supporting Actress	Three Sisters	Won	
Korean Film Producers Association Awards	2021	Best Supporting Actress	Three Sisters	Won	
MBC Drama Awards	2016	Golden Acting Award, Actress in a Miniseries	Shopping King Louie	Nominated	
MBC Drama Awards	2017	Golden Acting Award, Actress in a Monday-Tuesday Drama	The Guardians	Nominated	
MBC Drama Awards	2020	Best Supporting Actress	Kkondae Intern	Won	
Wildflower Film Awards	2018	Best Supporting Actress	Communication & Lies, Happy Bus Day	Won	

=== Listicles ===
Name of publisher, year listed, name of listicle, and placement
Publisher	Year	Listicle	Placement	Ref.
Korean Film Council	2021	Korean Actors 200 (Note: Introduces 200 actors that best represent the present and future of Korean cinema to the people in the film industry all over the world.)	Included	
