= 32nd Buil Film Awards =

2023 edition of award ceremony

- Official poster
- Awarded for: Excellence in cinematic achievements
- Awarded by: Busan Ilbo
- Presented by: Hwaseung Group
- Announced on: Nominations: August 27, 2023
- Presented on: October 5, 2023
- Site: Signiel Busan Grand Ballroom in Haeundae-gu, Busan
- Hosted by: Esom
- Official website: 2023 Buil Film Awards

Highlights
- Best Film: Concrete Utopia
- Star of the Year Award: Male: Doh Kyung-soo Female: Park Bo-young
- Best Director: Jung Ju-ri; Next Sohee
- Best Actor: Lee Byung-hun; Concrete Utopia
- Best Actress: Kim Seo-hyung; Green House
- Best Supporting Actor: Kim Jong-soo; Smugglers
- Best Supporting Actress: Go Min-si; Smugglers
- Most awards: 4 — Concrete Utopia
- Most nominations: 10 — Smugglers

Television coverage
- Network: MBC; Naver TV

The 32nd Buil Film Awards (Korean: 제32회 부일영화상) ceremony is hosted by the Busan-based daily newspaper Busan Ilbo. It was held on October 5, 2023, at the Signiel Busan Grand Ballroom in Haeundae-gu, Busan. In the 32nd edition, awards were presented in 16 categories for 222 Korean films that were released from August 11, 2022, to August 10, 2023. Film awards ceremony was preceded by walking the red carpet for the first time this year and Esom is the solo host of the award show.

The awards show attended by film industry celebrities was broadcast live on Naver TV. The film Concrete Utopia by Um Tae-hwa won 4 awards the best film award; best actor by Lee Byung-hun; star of the year (female) by Park Bo-young; and best cinematography by Cho Hyung-rae. Star of the Year Award (male) was won by Doh Kyung-soo for The Moon.

== Judging panel ==
The judging panel consisted of 9 members:

- Yoo Ji-na: Jury Chairman, film critic, professor at the Department of Film and Video at Dongguk University
- Nam Yu-jeong: Busan Ilbo Culture Department reporter
- Moon Gwan-gyu: professor of the Department of Arts, Culture and Film at Pusan National University
- Park In-ho: president of the Busan Film Critics Association
- Seong Il-kwon: publisher of Le Monde Diplomatique
- Lee Joo-hyun: Cine21 editor
- Lim Pil-seong: film director (the films Antarctic Diary and Madame Bbang-deok
- Jeon Chan-il: film critic, chairman of the Korean Cultural Content Critics Association
- Jeong Han-seok: Busan International Film Festival programmer

== Awards and nominations ==
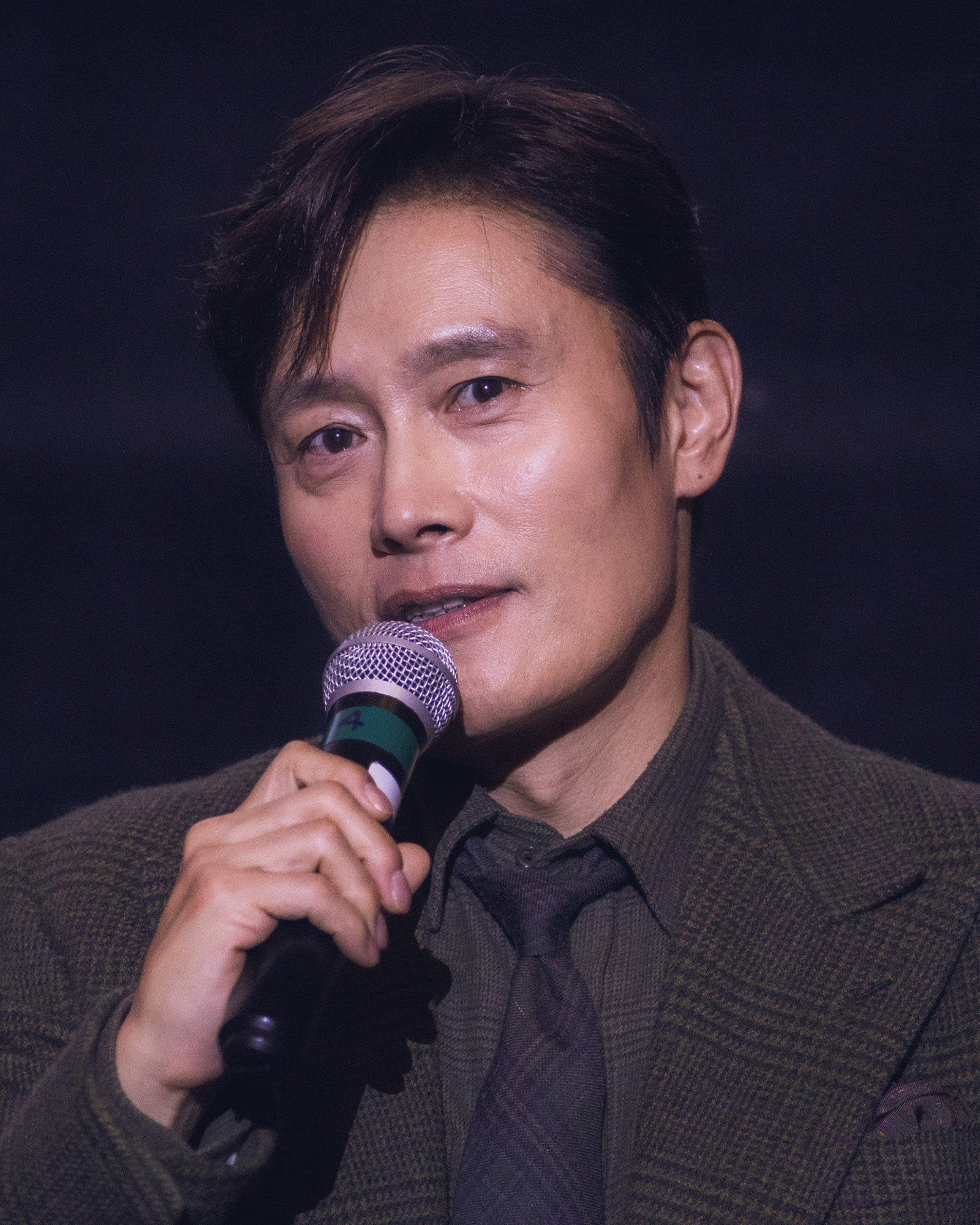
Lee Byung-hun, winner of Best Actor Award

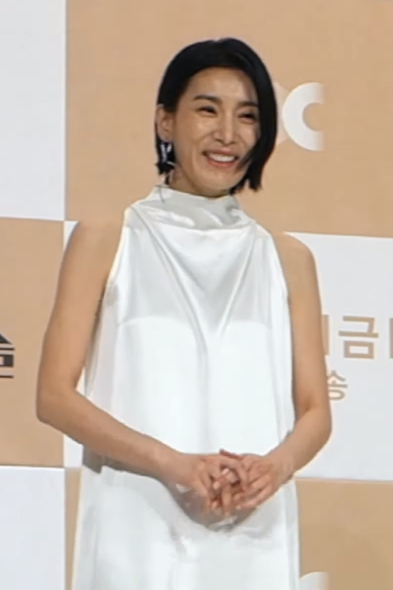
Kim Seo-hyung, winner of Best Actress Award

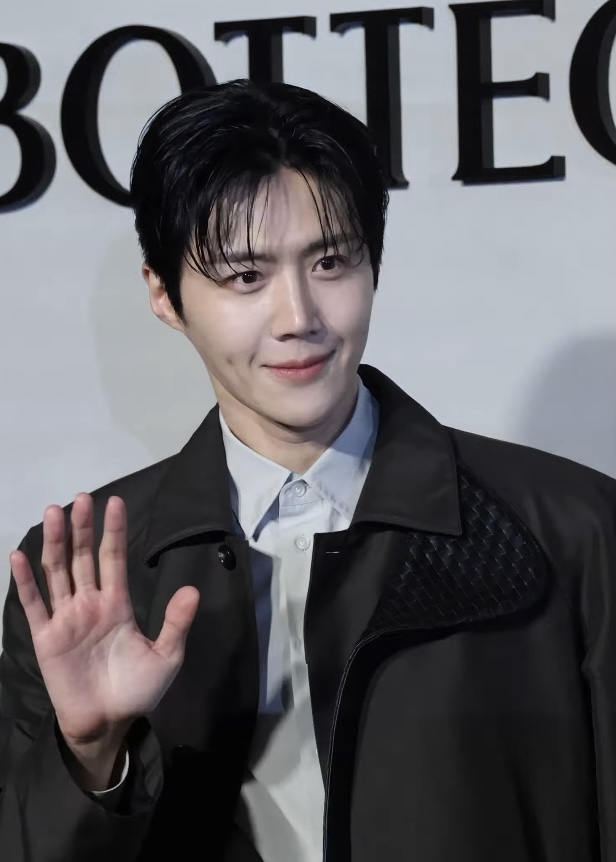
Kim Seon-ho, winner of Best New Actor Award

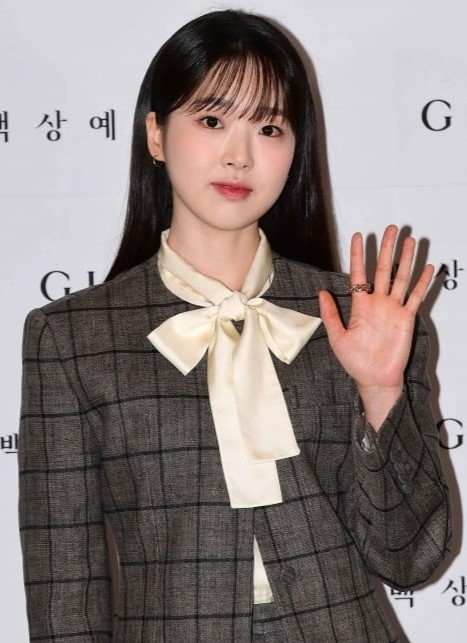
Kim Si-eun, winner of Best New Actress Award

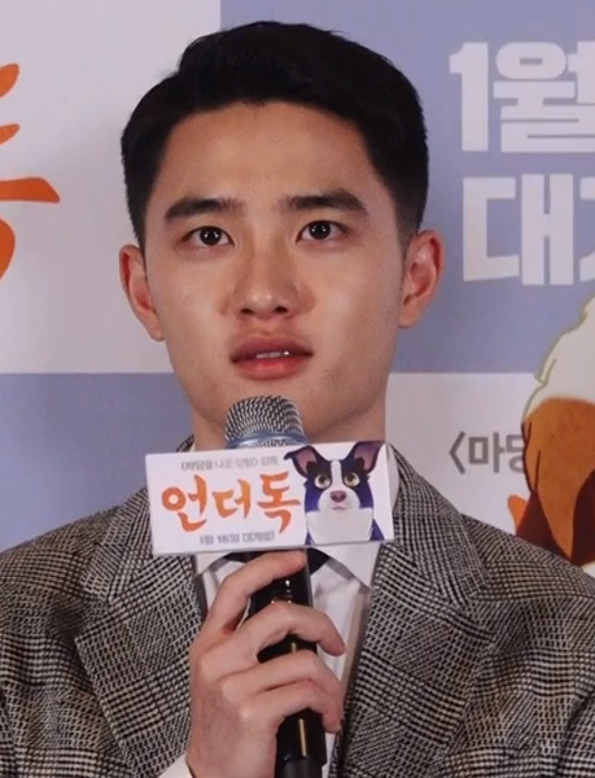
Doh Kyung-soo

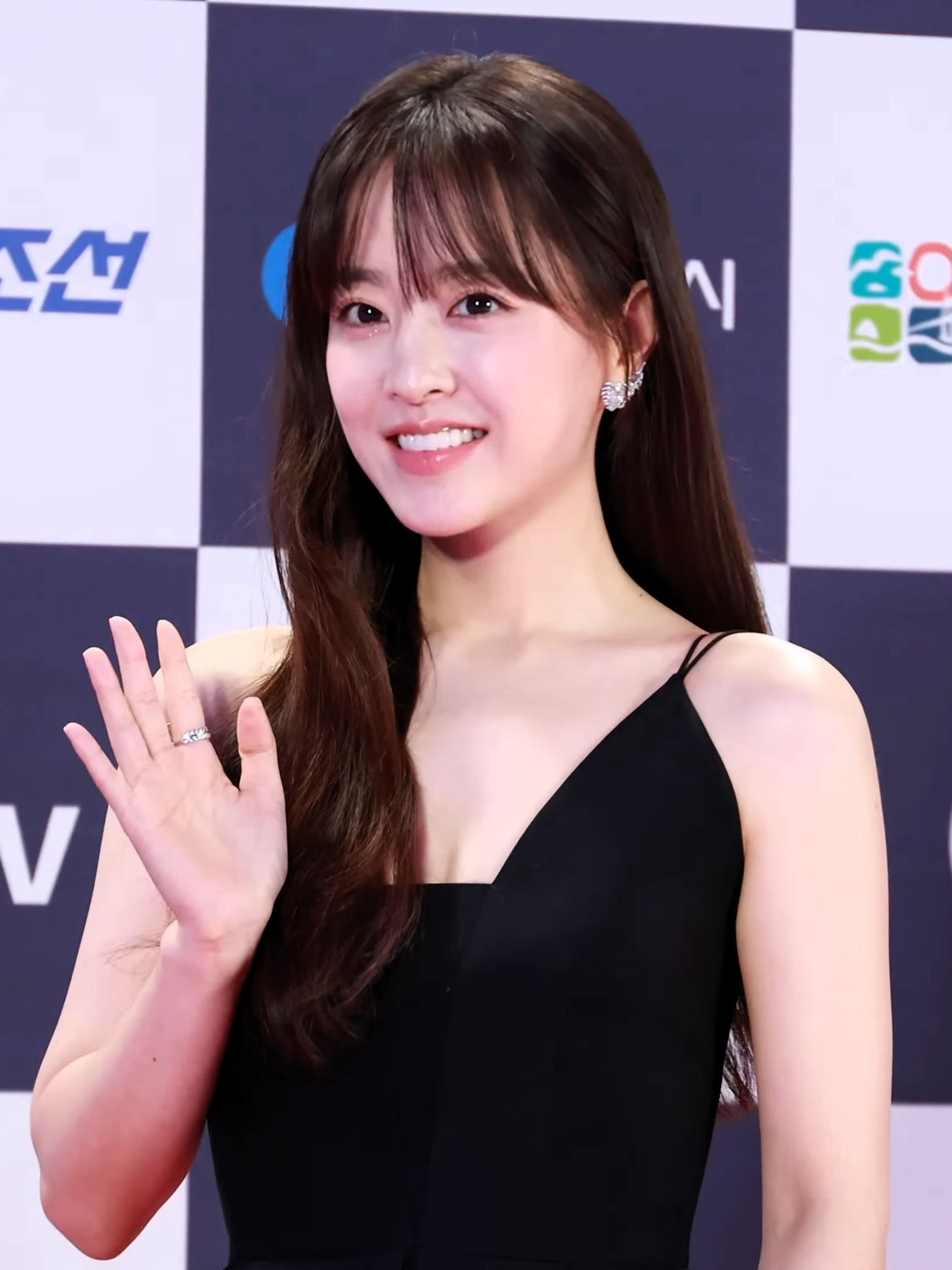
Park Bo-young

Star of the Year Award

Nominees and winners (winners denoted in bold):

Best Film	Best Director
**Concrete Utopia**; Next Sohee; The Night Owl; Smugglers; Walk Up	**Jung Ju-ri – Next Sohee**; Ryoo Seung-wan – Smugglers; Um Tae-hwa – Concrete Utopia; Yim Soon-rye – The Point Men; Hong Sang-soo – Walk Up
Best Actor	Best Actress
**Lee Byung-hun – Concrete Utopia**; Doh Kyung-soo – The Moon; Ryu Jun-yeol – The Night Owl; Yoo Hae-jin – The Night Owl; Im Si-wan – Unlocked	**Kim Seo-hyung – Green House**; Bae Doona – Next Sohee; Yang Mal-bok – The Apartment with Two Women; Yum Jung-ah — Smugglers; Jeon Do-yeon – Kill Boksoon
Best Supporting Actor	Best Supporting Actress
**Kim Jong-soo – Smugglers**; Kang Ki-young – The Point Men; Ko Kyu-pil – The Roundup: No Way Out; Kim Sung-cheol – The Night Owl; Park Jung-min – Smugglers	**Go Min-si – Smugglers**; Kim Sun-young – Concrete Utopia; Na Moon-hee – Hero; Park Se-wan — 6/45; Lee Yeon – Kill Boksoon
Best New Director	Best Screenplay
**Lee Ji-eun – The Hill of Secrets**; Kim Sae-in – The Apartment with Two Women; Park Song-yeol – Hot in Day, Cold at Night; Ahn Tae-jin – The Night Owl; Choi Seung-yeon – Sprinter	**Kim Sae-in – The Apartment with Two Women**; Park Gyu-tae – 6/45; Lee Shin-ji, Um Tae-hwa – Concrete Utopia; Jung Ju-ri – Next Sohee; Hyeon Gyu-ri, Ahn Tae-jin – The Night Owl
Best New Actor	Best New Actress
**Kim Seon-ho – The Childe**; Byeon Woo-seok – 20th Century Girl; Lee Soon-won – 6/45; Lee Shin-young – Rebound; Jung Il-woo – Highway Family	**Kim Si-eun – Next Sohee**; Go Min-si – Smugglers; Kim Yong-ji – Doom Doom; Ahn Eun-jin – The Night Owl; Lim Ji-ho – The Apartment with Two Women
Best Cinematography	Art/Technical Award
**Cho Hyung-rae – Concrete Utopia**; Kim Young-ho – The Moon; Choi Young-hwan – Smugglers; Kim Tae-seong – Ransomed; Cho Sang-yoon – Hero	**Jin Jong-hyun – The Moon (VFX)**; Lee Hu-Kyung – Smugglers (Art); Kim Bo-muk – Phantom (Art); Cho Hwa-sung – Concrete Utopia (Art); Shin Yu-jin – Killing Romance (Art)
Best Music	Yu Hyun-mok Film Arts Award
**Dalpalan – Phantom**; Chang Kiha – Smugglers; Hwang Sang-jun – Hero; Kim Joon-seok – Life Is Beautiful; Kim Hae-won – Concrete Utopia	**Bae Doona – Next Sohee**
Star of the Year Award (Male)	Star of the Year Award (Female)
**Doh Kyung-soo** – The Moon	**Park Bo-young** – Concrete Utopia

== Films with multiple nominations ==
The following films received multiple nominations:

Nominations	Films
10	Smugglers
8	Concrete Utopia
7	The Night Owl
4	Next Sohee
3	6/45
3	The Moon

== See also ==
- 59th Baeksang Arts Awards
- Chunsa Film Art Awards 2023
