= Kim Jong-soo (actor) =

South Korean actor

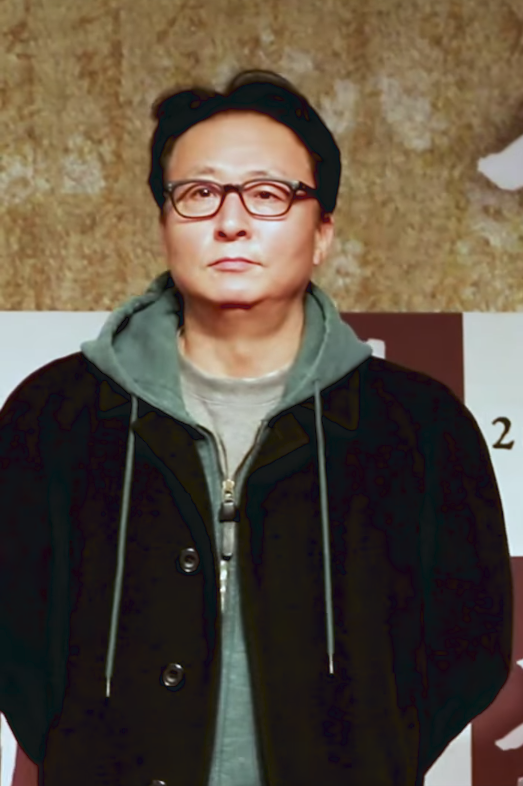
- Kim in February 2018
- Born: November 30, 1964 (age 61); Busan, South Korea
- Education: University of Ulsan (Department of Chemistry)
- Occupation: Actor
- Years active: 1985–present
- Agent: Artist Company

Korean name
- Hangul: 김종수
- Hanja: 金種水
- RR: Gim Jongsu
- MR: Kim Chongsu

Kim Jong-Soo (Korean: 김종수; born November 30, 1964) is a South Korean actor. His acting career began in 1985 when he took on the role of Alan in the play Equus. He gained recognition through his performances in various theatrical productions in Ulsan, earning him several awards. In 1996, he was honored with the Gyeongnam Theater Award for Best Actor, followed by the Outstanding Acting Award at the Ulsan Theater Festival in 2000 and the Mayor's Achievement Award at the Ulsan Arts Festival in 2002. Moreover, he also held the position of president in the Ulsan Actors Association.

In 2007, Kim Jong-Soo made his film debut with an appearance in Secret Sunshine, directed by Lee Chang-dong. Subsequently, he appeared in movies like No Forgiveness, Wish, War on Crime, Home Sweet Home, The King of Flattery, Man in Love, Legendary Fist, and Minority Opinion. Kim has been recognized through his supporting roles in television dramas such as Six Flying Dragons, The Producers, Three Days, Misaeng: Incomplete Life, Pied Piper, Kingdom, The Emperor: Owner of the Mask, and Snowdrop.

Starting from 2016, he embarked on a series of film projects, starring in The Prosecutor's Abduction, Seondal: The Man Who Sells the River, Asura: The City of Madness, Tunnel, Horror Stories 3, One Way Trip, The Map Against the World, and Insane.

== Career ==
In 1984, Kim joined the Whales Theatre and began his career in 1985 directing plays such as Beautiful Autograph, Tropical Thief Story, and My Lime Orange Tree. He debuted in the 2007 South Korean drama film Secret Sunshine as the new president and starred in the film Poongsan (2011) as the North Korean defector.

Most recently, he has been featured in the films: The Map Against the World (2016), Asura: The City Of Madness (2016), Our Love Story (2016), Tunnel (2017), Drug King (2018), and Money (2019). According to Artist Company, he is known as "a veteran actor who has a track record of over 70 theatre productions".

== Filmography ==
=== Film ===
Year	Title	Role	Notes	Ref.
2007	Secret Sunshine	President Shin		
2008	Romantic Island	Mover	Bit part	
2009	Wish	Cosmetic boss	Bit part	
2010	No Mercy	Attorney	Bit part	
2011	Play	Club boss		
2011	Poongsan	North Korean defector		
2012	Nameless Gangster: Rules of the Time	Manager Jang		
2012	Home Sweet Home	NA		
2012	Mr. XXX-Kisser	Director Jung		
2013	Fists of Legends	Editor in chief		
2014	Man in Love	Chief of security (Prison)	Bit part	
2015	Mongolian Princess	Movie actor	Cameo	
2015	Twenty	Dong-woo's uncle	Bit part	
2015	The Unfair	Kkeunson		
2016	A Violent Prosecutor	Head Judge Park Chung-jik		
2016	One Way Trip	Team Leader Oh		
2016	Insane	Director Cha		
2016	The Boys Who Cried Wolf	Goh Suk-tae	Cameo	
2016	Horror Stories 3	Gray-haired old man		
2016	Seondal: The Man Who Sells the River	Noble man		
2016	Tunnel	Drilling company executive	Cameo	
2016	The Map Against the World	Kim Byung-hak		
2016	Asura: The City of Madness	Eun Choong-ho		
2017	The Sheriff in Town	Yong-Hwan		
2017	The Poet and the Boy	CEO of Dongin		
2017	Room No.7	Real estate agent		
2017	1987: When the Day Comes	Park Jung-ki		
2018	The Spy Gone North	CEO Kim	Voice cameo	
2018	Dark Figure of Crime	Captain Masoo		
2018	The Drug King	Choi Kwang-hyun		
2019	Extreme Job	Chicken restaurant owner		
2019	Innocent Witness	Man-ho		
2019	Money	Department Head Kim		
2019	The Fault Is Not Yours	Hospital Director		
2019	Start-Up	President Kong		
2019	Baseball Girl	Coach Park		
2020	Okay! Madam	Choi Young-cheol	Cameo	
2020	Samjin Company English Class	Bong Hyun-chul		
2022	Hunt	Director Ahn		
2022	Life Is Beautiful	Mokpo high school teacher	Cameo	
2023	Phantom	Projectionist	Cameo	
2023	Dream	Kim Hwan-dong		
2023	Hopeless	Joong-beom		
2023	Smugglers	Lee Jang-chun		
2023	Ransomed	Minister Choi		
2023	Dr. Cheon and Lost Talisman	President Hwang		
2024	Alienoid: Return to the Future	Government official	Bit part	
2024	Hijack 1971	Jang Young-hwan	Cameo	
2024	Revolver	Manager		
2024	Bogotá: City of the Lost	Song Geun-tae		
2025	Lobby	Motors CEO		
2025	Good News	President	Cameo	
2026	Humint	Director General Kim	Cameo	

=== Television series ===
Year	Title	Role	Notes/Ref.
2009	Superkids	Magic Quiz host	
2009	Friend, Our Legend	Dong-su's father	
2013	The Prime Minister and I	Kong Taek-soo	
2014	Three Days	Byeon Tae-hoon	
2014	Misaeng: Incomplete Life	Department Head Kim Boo-ryeon	
2015	The Jingbirok: A Memoir of Imjin War	Hwang Yoon-gil	
2015	The Producers	Baek Bo-sun	
2015	Six Flying Dragons	Lee Saek	
2016	Pied Pieper	Yang Chung-jang	
2016	A Beautiful Mind	Shin Dong-jae	
2017	The Emperor: Owner of the Mask	Joo Jin-myung	
2017	Distorted	Min Young-ho	
2017	Argon	So Tae-seob	
2018	Queen of Mystery 2	Shin Jang-goo	
2019	Haechi	Lee Yi-kyum	
2019	Vagabond	Director General An	
2019	The Lies Within	Kim Seung-cheol	
2019	Kingdom	Kim Soon	Season 1
2021–2022	Snowdrop	Kim Man-dong	
2023	My Perfect Stranger	Byung-gu	
2023	Moving	Hwang Ji-sung	
2025	Low Life	Song Ki-taek	
2025	Aema	Kwon Do-il	
2025	The Manipulated	Noh Yong-sik	
2026	Teach You a Lesson	Hwang Gi-tae	

== Awards and nominations ==
Name of the award ceremony, year presented, category, nominee of the award, and the result of the nomination
Year	Award ceremony	Category	Nominee / Work	Result	Ref.
1996	Gyeongnam Theater Festival	Best Actor Award	Whales's Theater Work	Won	
1996	Gyeongnam Theater Festival	Excellence Actor Award	Whales's Theater Work	Won	
2000	Ulsan Theater Festival	Excellence Actor Award	Whales's Theater Work	Won	
2000	National Theater Festival	Presidential Award	Whales's Theater Work	Won	
2002	Ulsan Arts Festival	Mayor Achievement Award	Whales's Theater Work	Won	
2006	Ulsan Theater Festival	Best Actor Award	Whales's Theater Work	Won	
2008	Ulsan Youth Theater Festival	Grand Prize (Directing Award)	Whales's Theater Work	Won	
2023	32nd Buil Film Awards	Best Supporting Actor	Smugglers	Won	
2023	Korean Association of Film Critics Awards	Best Supporting Actor	Smugglers	Won	
2023	59th Grand Bell Awards	Best Supporting Actor	Smugglers	Nominated	
2024	60th Baeksang Arts Awards	Best Supporting Actor – Film	Smugglers	Won	
