= Lee Won-suk =

South Korean film director (born 1974)

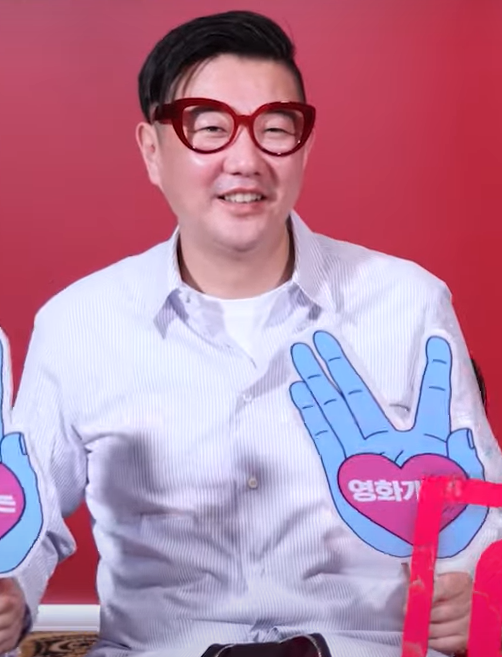
- Lee in March 2023
- Born: 9 January 1974 (age 52); South Korea
- Occupations: Film director, screenwriter

Korean name
- Hangul: 이원석
- RR: I Wonseok
- MR: I Wŏnsŏk

Lee Won-suk (Korean: 이원석; born 9 January 1974) is a South Korean film director. Lee acted as the assistant director on the South Korean omnibus film Five Senses of Eros (2009), before releasing his filmmaking debut, the romantic comedy How to Use Guys with Secret Tips (2013). Though not a commercial success, the film won the Golden Mulberry Award (Audience Award) at the 15th Far East Film Festival and the Bronze Prize for Best Asian Feature at the Fantasia International Film Festival in 2013.

His second feature, a period drama The Royal Tailor (2014), won the Audience Award (Second Place) and My Movie Audience Award at the 17th Udine Far East Film Festival, and the Audience Award at the New York Asian Film Festival in 2015.

== Filmography ==
- Deotchil (short film, 2005) - director, producer director, editor
- Five Senses of Eros (2009) - 1st assistant director
- How to Use Guys with Secret Tips (2013) - director, screenwriter
- The Royal Tailor (2014) - director
- Killing Romance (2023) - director
- The Divorce Insurance (2025) - co-director
