= Jung Sung-hwa =

South Korean actor (born 1975)

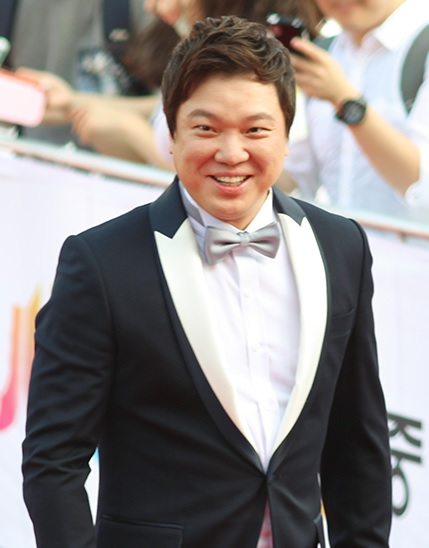
- Jung in 2013
- Born: January 2, 1975 (age 51); South Korea
- Occupation: Actor
- Years active: 1994–present

Korean name
- Hangul: 정성화
- RR: Jeong Seonghwa
- MR: Chŏng Sŏnghwa

Jung Sung-hwa (Korean: 정성화; born January 2, 1975) is a South Korean actor. He is best known in musical theatre, and has starred in Korean productions of Man of La Mancha and Les Misérables.

== Filmography ==
=== Film ===
| Year | Title | Role | Notes | Ref. |
|---|---|---|---|---|
| 2001 | Ahmijimong | | | |
| 2003 | Once Upon a Time in a Battlefield | Moon-Di | | |
| 2005 | Princess Aurora | | | |
| 2006 | Love Phobia | Joon-Chul | | |
| 2009 | Fortune Salon | Insurance company employee | | |
| 2010 | Finding Mr. Destiny | Tour guide | | |
| 2011 | Meet the In-Laws | Woon-Bong | | |
| 2011 | The Last Blossom | Owner of fruit shop | | |
| 2011 | Hit | James | | |
| 2012 | Dancing Queen | Jong-Chan | | |
| 2012 | All About My Wife | Newspaper delivery man | | |
| 2012 | A Millionaire On The Run | Moo-Duk | | |
| 2012 | Tumbleweed | Sang-Tae | | |
| 2014 | The Pirates | Bak-Mo | | |
| 2015 | Enemies In-Law | Man using urinal | | |
| 2015 | The Long Way Home | Regimental Commander in South-Korean army | | |
| 2016 | Phantom Detective | Innkeeper | | |
| 2016 | Split | Dooggeobi | | |
| 2022 | Hero | An Jung-geun | First Lead Role, Musical Drama film | |
| 2024 | Dog Days | Seon-yong | | |

=== Television series ===
| Year | Title | Role | Ref. |
|---|---|---|---|
| 2002 | Hyeon-jeong, I Love You | Ko Ki-Chan | |
| 2003 | A Problem at My Younger Brother's House | | |
| 2009 | My Dad Loves Trouble | Park Nam-Sik | |
| 2010 | Personal Taste | No Sang-Jun | |

=== Hosting ===
| Year | Title | Role | Notes | Ref. |
|---|---|---|---|---|
| 2021 | 17th Jecheon International Music and Film Festival | Host | with Hwang Seung-eon | |

== Theater ==
| Year | Title | Role | Ref. |
|---|---|---|---|
| 2021 | Beetlejuice | Beetlejuice | |
| 2021–2022 | A Gentleman's Guide to Love and Murder | D'Ysquith | |
| 2022 | Mrs. Doubtfire | Daniel / Doutfire | |
| 2022–2023 | Hero | Ahn Jung-geun | |

== Awards and nominations ==
Name of the award ceremony, year presented, category, nominee of the award, and the result of the nomination
| Award ceremony | Year | Category | Nominee / Work | Result | Ref. |
|---|---|---|---|---|---|
| Director's Cut Awards | 2023 | Best Actor in film | Hero | Nominated | |
