= Park Hee-gon =

South Korean filmmaker (1969–2025)

- Born: 1969; South Korea
- Died: 30 April 2025 (aged 56); South Korea
- Occupations: Film director, screenwriter

Korean name
- Hangul: 박희곤
- RR: Bak Huigon
- MR: Pak Hŭigon

Park Hee-gon (Korean: 박희곤; 1969 – 30 April 2025) was a South Korean film director and screenwriter. He died on 30 April 2025, at the age of 56.

== Filmography ==
- R. U. Ready? (2002) – producer-director
- Insadong Scandal (2009) – director, screenwriter
- Perfect Game (2011) – director, screenwriter
- Catman (2016) – director
- Fengshui (2018) – director, script editor
- Don't Buy the Seller (타겟) (2023) – director, screenwriter
