= Killing Romance =

2023 Korean film directed by Lee Won-suk

- Theatrical release poster
- Hangul: 킬링 로맨스
- RR: Killing romaenseu
- MR: K'illing romaensŭ
- Directed by: Lee Won-suk
- Screenplay by: Park Jeong-ye
- Produced by: Mo Il-young; Kim Sung-hoon
- Starring: Lee Hanee; Lee Sun-kyun; Gong Myung
- Cinematography: Kang Min-woo
- Edited by: Jeong Ji-eun
- Music by: Dalpalan
- Production companies: Lee Chang Film; Shortcake
- Distributed by: Lotte Entertainment
- Release date: April 14, 2023
- Running time: 106 minutes
- Country: South Korea
- Language: Korean
- Box office: US$1.4 million

Killing Romance (Korean: 킬링 로맨스; RR: Killing romaenseu) is a 2023 South Korean musical romantic comedy film directed by Lee Won-suk, starring Lee Hanee, Lee Sun-kyun, and Gong Myung. Described as "a love story, a musical, a murder plot and a million things in between," the film follows a former star actress as she teams up with her super-fan teenage neighbor in an attempt to escape her toxic marriage to a cartoonishly villainous real estate mogul.

== Plot ==
Hwa Yeo-rae is a popular actress who became famous advertising a soda brand and other gadgets. She starred in several successful movies, although her final movie was panned, with fans criticizing her performance and mocking her catchphrase. Distressed by the performance of her last movie, Yeo-are flees to the fictional tropical island of Qualla, where she meets a too good to be true real estate developer, Jonathan Na. The two marry and move back to Seoul, where Jonathan reveals himself to be a status-obsessed and controlling husband, whose eccentricities (like the various pre-styled fake mustaches he wears, or his catchphrase "It's Goooood!") grate on Yeo-rae. Depressed and lonely, Yeo-rae has retired from her acting career. Some fans, however, remain loyal and sing a theme song they created for the star. One such fan is Yeo-rae's next-door neighbor, Beom-woo (an otherwise uninspired teenager and three-time failed test-taker) who, in a chance encounter with Yeo-rae, begins to help her plot her husband's murder.

The two begin to communicate in secret. Several plans, including an allergy attack, car crash, and paper plane injury, are discarded before they decide to use Jonathan's ego against him. Yeo-rae brings her husband to a sauna, and along with Beom-woo challenges him to sweat himself to death in a jjimjilbang. Although the plot is successful, Beom-woo isn't able to go through with the murder, and saves Jonathan at the last moment. Grateful, and unaware of Beom-woo's true identity, Jonathan initiates a friendship with the teenager, inviting him over to dinner while Yeo-rae is attempting a second murder, returning to the earlier allergy attack idea. The attempt is unsuccessful, and Yeo-rae says a tearful goodbye to Beom-woo as she plans to permanently relocate to Qualla with Jonathan, where his new theme is being built. Feeling guilty, Beom-woo goes to the island to rescue her, but is unsuccessful. Yeo-rae, even after jumping off a cliff to escape her husband, remains trapped on the island, along with the remaining ostriches whose habitat has been destroyed with the construction of Jonathan's theme park.

The couple finally returns to Seoul to promote the park's opening. Seeing advertising for the event, Beom-woo is inspired to help Yeo-rae finally be free, and recruits friends to crash the event. When they arrive, Jonathan and his security team seem to have the upper hand, but the arrival of a small group of Yeo-rae's loyal fans, singing her theme song, turns the tide. As Jonathan makes a last-ditch attempt to reach Yeo-rae, a vengeful ostrich who has followed Jonathan from the island swoops in and carries him off. Yeo-rae makes a semi-successful return to acting, and her longstanding fan club excitedly follows her reignited career.

A post-credits scene shows Jonathan, sunburnt and dehydrated, calling hopelessly for his bodyguard as he floats in the middle of the ocean.

== Cast ==
- Lee Hanee as Hwang Yeo-rae
- Lee Sun-kyun as Jonathan Na
- Gong Myung as Kim Beom-woo

== Production ==
Filmed early during the ongoing COVID-19 pandemic, the director and crew suffered difficulties securing shooting locations, including rewriting one scene to take place in a jjimjilbang instead of on a yacht, as planned. A key song for the film, based on the Korean singer-actor Rain's 2008 hit song "Rainism," was re-recorded by the original artist for the movie thanks to star Lee honey's friendship with Rain's wife. The director "clashed with Warner Brothers, which was producing the film, over its length, and when he did deliver a final cut the studio was reluctant to even release it."

== Reception ==
Released in South Korea on April 14, 2023, the film made $467,905 its opening weekend and has grossed domestically $1,383,439 as of July, 2023. In spite of a poor rating and initial unfavorable reviews, the film picked up traction on Twitter and has since gained cult status in Korea, with some moviegoers traveling hours by bus to see the movie and others on their 18th or 20th viewing. Internationally, the film has received largely positive reviews. At the Far East Film Festival in Italy, where the film made its world festival premiere, the movie was described as "a cross between Memories of Matsuko and the films of Wes Anderson... that screams 'cult movie.'"

The film made its North American premiere as the opening night selection for the New York Asian Film Festival on July 14, 2023. The film's star Lee Hanee won NYAFF's 2023 Best from the East Award, which honors a singularly outstanding performance on a film, for her "absolutely dazzling comedic performance as a former superstar whose would-be dream marriage takes her to the depths of an existential hell and back proves the actress an unstoppable force of nature." Director Lee Won-suk previously won NYAFF's 2015 Audience Award for his second feature film, The Royal Tailor.

Currently, the film has a rating of 6.3/10 on IMDB, and a rating of 77% on Korean movie chain CGV's Golden Egg rating system. Indiewire described it as one of the best movies at the 2023 New York Asian Film Festival.

== Awards and nominations ==
Name of the award ceremony, year presented, category, nominee of the award, and the result of the nomination
Award ceremony	Year	Category	Nominee	Result	Ref.
Baeksang Arts Awards	2024	Best Actress	Lee Hanee	Nominated	
Baeksang Arts Awards	2024	Best Screenplay	Park Jung-ye	Nominated	
Buil Film Awards	2023	Art/Technical award	Shin Yu-jin	Nominated	
Grand Bell Awards	2023	Best Costume Design	Yoon Jung-hee	Won	
Grand Bell Awards	2023	Best Art Direction	Shin Yu-jin	Nominated	
