= Plus M Entertainment =

South Korean film production company

Plus M Entertainment (Korean: 플러스엠 엔터테인먼트) is a South Korean film distribution company and a subsidiary of Megabox JoongAng Co. Ltd. It is one of the largest film distribution companies in South Korea.

== Releases ==
=== Films ===
==== 2023 ====
- The Point Men
- The Devil's Deal
- Dream
- The Roundup: No Way Out
- Don't Buy the Seller
- Hopeless
- 12.12: The Day

==== 2024 ====
- Dead Man
- The Roundup: Punishment
- Escape
- Revolver
- Mission: Cross

==== 2025 ====
- The Ugly

==== 2026 ====
- Hope
- Canvas of Blood

==== TBA ====
- The Sword: Rebirth of the Red Wolf
