= Yoon So-hee =

South Korean actress (born 1993)

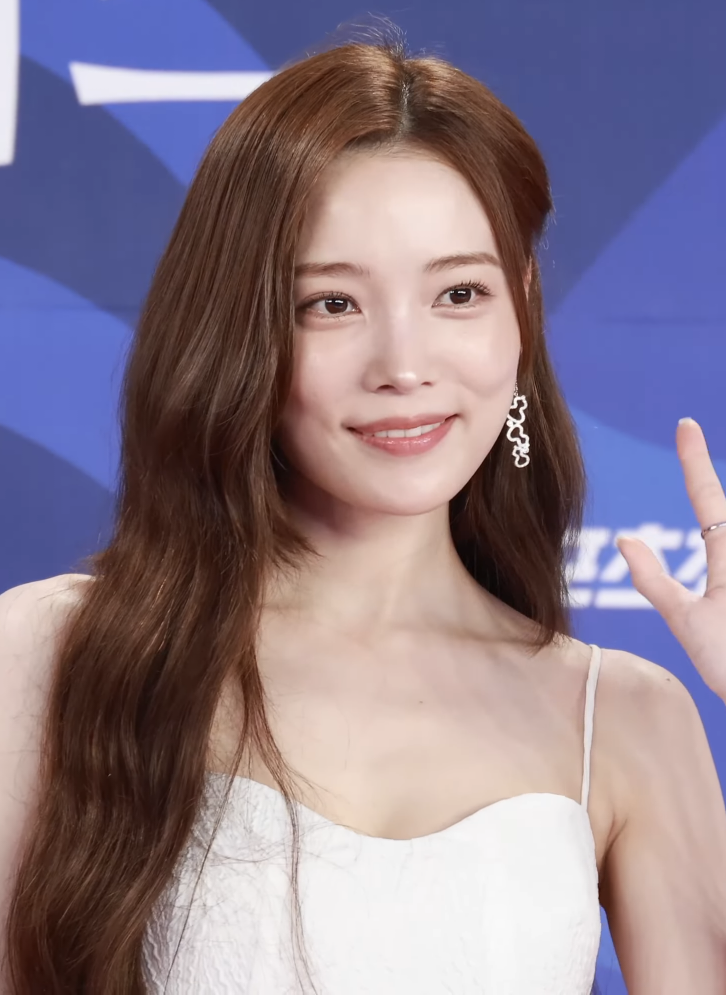
- Yoon in July 2025
- Born: May 7, 1993 (age 33); Stuttgart, Baden-Württemberg, Germany
- Citizenship: South Korea
- Education: KAIST
- Occupation: Actress
- Years active: 2013–present
- Agent: Saram Entertainment

Korean name
- Hangul: 윤소희
- Hanja: 尹邵熙
- RR: Yun Sohui
- MR: Yun Sohŭi

Yoon So-hee (Korean: 윤소희; born May 7, 1993) is a South Korean actress.

== Early life and education ==
Yoon was born in Stuttgart, Germany, on May 7, 1993, and lived there for six years before returning to Seoul. In 2011, she enrolled as a Chemical and Biomolecular Engineering major at Korea Advanced Institute of Science and Technology, one of South Korea's prestigious science and research universities; she was on a leave of absence until 2021. Later, she returned to study. She graduated from KAIST in 2023.

== Career ==
Yoon was first featured on Hit the S Style, a variety show which spotlights campus style icons which was aired on tvN. She then appeared in the intermission video at Super Show 5, a concert tour by Super Junior, followed by an uncredited cameo in the music video for SHINee's "Why So Serious?".

In 2013, she starred in music videos by EXO in EXO Music Video Drama (in both Korean and Mandarin Chinese versions). Afterwards, Yoon made her acting debut in the period drama The Blade and Petal. She has since been cast in increasingly larger roles in television dramas such as Let's Eat (2013) and Secret Door (2014), where she acted as the older version Kim You-jung's character.

Yoon had her film debut in the romance film Salut d'Amour (2015) as the younger version of Youn Yuh-jung's character, followed by a supporting role in the South Korean-Chinese film Life Risking Romance (2016). In 2016, she had her first leading role in KBS' mini drama The Day After We Broke Up alongside Kim Myung-soo.

Yoon gained increased recognition following her supporting role in the sageuk The Emperor: Owner of the Mask. In 2018, Yoon portrayed her first lead role in the romantic comedy drama Witch's Love.

In October 2022, Yoon signed with new agency Saram Entertainment.

== Filmography ==
=== Film ===
Year	Title	Role	Ref.
2015	Salut d'Amour	young Im Geum-nim	
2016	Life Risking Romance	Jung Yoo-mi	
TBA	Get Rich		
TBA	Late Night Washing Machine	Kim Jin-seo	

=== Television series ===
Year	Title	Role	Notes	Ref.
2013	The Blade and Petal	Nang-ga		
2013	Drama Festival: "Surviving in Africa"	Yoon Na-ra		
2013	Let's Eat	Yoon Jin-yi		
2014	Love in Memory 2: "Dad's Notes"	Soo-jung	Mobile drama	
2014	12 Years Promise	young Jang Gook		
2014	Big Man	So Hye-ra		
2014	Marriage, Not Dating	Nam Hyun-hee		
2014	Secret Door	Seo Ji-dam/Park Bingae	Ep. 14–24	
2015	This Is My Love	23-year-old Ji Eun-dong		
2016	Memory	Bong Sun-hwa		
2016	One More Time	Moon Da-in		
2017	Queen of the Ring	Kang Mi-joo		
2017	The Emperor: Owner of the Mask	Kim Hwa-gun		
2017	Because This Is My First Life	Herself	Cameo Ep. 1	
2017	Meloholic	Herself	Cameo	
2018	Witch's Love	Kang Cho-hong		
2020	The Spies Who Loved Me	Sophie Ahn	Cameo	
2022	Ghost Doctor	Im Bo-mi		
2023	Heartbeat	Yoon Hae-seon / Na Hae-won		

=== Web series ===
Year	Title	Role	Ref.
2016	Bong Soon - a Cyborg in Love	Bong Soon	
2016	After The Show Ends	Go Ali	
2021	Peng	Go Sa-ri	

=== Television shows ===
Year	Title	Role	Notes	Ref.
2016	After the Play Ends	Cast member	Eps. 1–8	
2018	Friendly Driver	Cast member	Starts 24 January	
2018	A Coveted Cruise	Cast member		
2019	Nowadays Bookstore: I will read books	Cast member		
2021	Why Is Classical	Host	Season 2	
2025	The Devil's Plan: Death Room	Runner-up	Season 2	

=== Hosting ===
Year	Title	Ref.
2021	AI Conference for All	

=== Music video appearances ===
Year	Song Title	Artist	Notes
2013	"Why So Serious?"	Shinee	
2013	"Wolf"	Exo	For MAMA 2013, Drama Ver.
2013	"Growl"	Exo	For MAMA 2013, Drama Ver.

== Ambassadorship ==
- Hall of Science Honorary Ambassador (2022)

== Awards and nominations ==
Name of the award ceremony, year presented, category, nominee of the award, and the result of the nomination
Award ceremony	Year	Category	Nominee / Work	Result	Ref.
MBC Drama Awards	2017	Excellence Award, Actress in a Miniseries	The Emperor: Owner of the Mask	Nominated	
Soompi Awards	2018	Best Supporting Actress	The Emperor: Owner of the Mask	Nominated	
The Seoul Awards	2017	Best New Actress (Drama)	The Emperor: Owner of the Mask	Won	
