= Yim Si-wan =

South Korean singer and actor (born 1988)

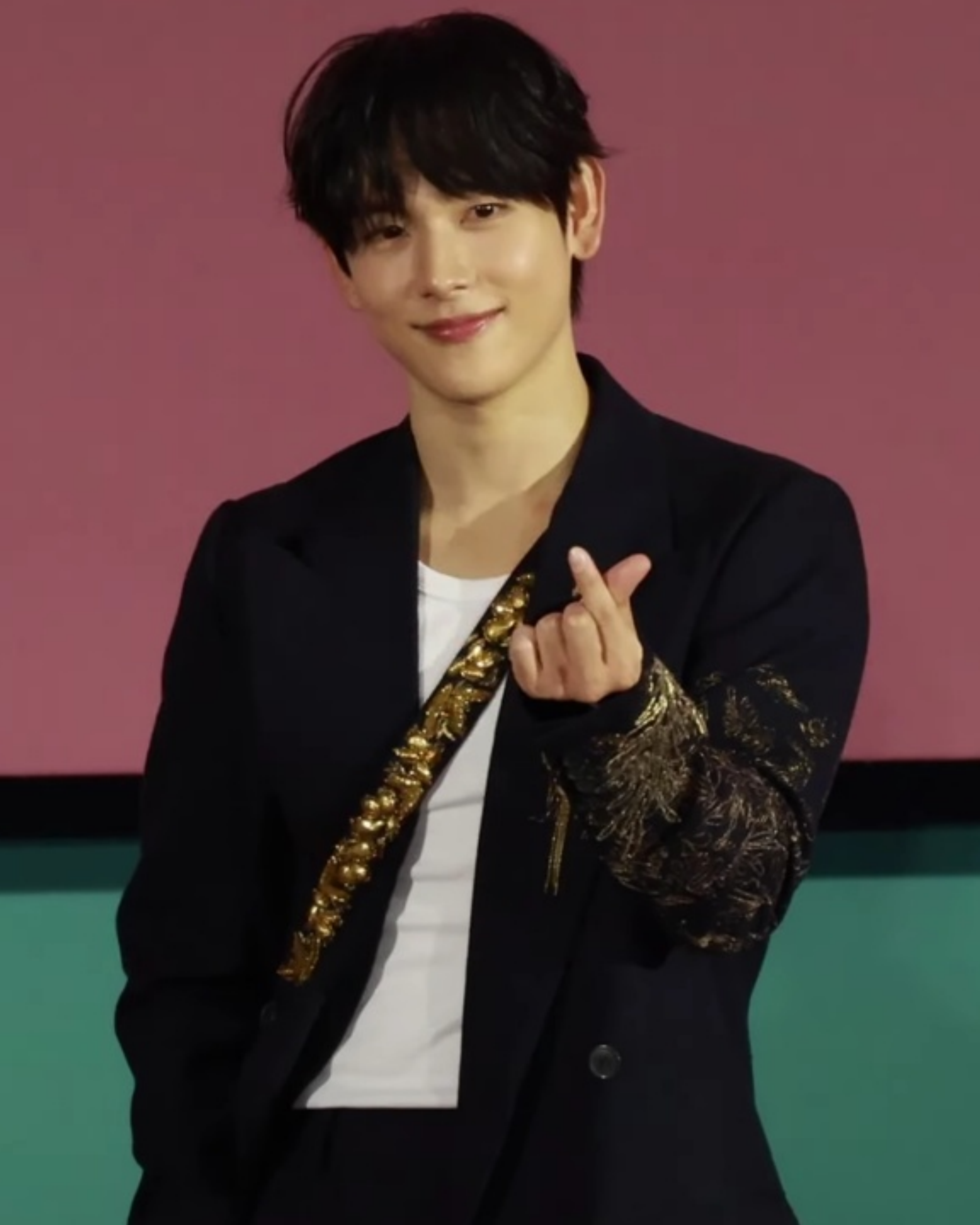
- Yim in December 2024
- Born: Yim Woong-jae; December 1, 1988 (age 37); Busan, South Korea
- Education: Woosong University
- Occupations: Singer; actor
- Years active: 2010–present
- Agent: The Black Label
- Musical career
- Genre: K-pop
- Instruments: Vocals; guitar; violin
- Years active: 2010–2017; 2025–present
- Labels: Star Empire; SMart
- Member of: ZE:A

Korean name
- Hangul: 임시완
- Hanja: 任時完
- RR: Im Siwan
- MR: Im Siwan

Birth name
- Hangul: 임웅재
- RR: Im Ungjae
- MR: Im Ungjae

Yim Si-wan (Korean: 임시완; born Yim Woong-jae, December 1, 1988) is a South Korean singer and actor. He debuted as a member of the South Korean boy group ZE:A and its sub-group ZE:A Five. As an actor, he is known for starring in the film The Attorney (2013) as well as the television series Misaeng: Incomplete Life (2014) and Run On (2020). He gained international recognition for his role in the second and third seasons of Squid Game (2024–2025).

== Early life and education ==
Yim Si-wan was born Yim Woong-jae on December 1, 1988, in Busan, South Korea. He attended Busan Gudeok High School, Pusan National University, University of East Broadcasting Arts, and is currently studying at Woosong Information College. He legally changed his name to the current name before his debut.

== Career ==
=== 2009–2010: Debut with ZE:A ===
While Yim was attending the Chin Chin Song Festival in Busan, Star Empire recruited him as a trainee. He joined a nine-member group called "Children of Empire", where he trained for three years. In 2009, the group started doing guerrilla performances around the country, when he adopted the stage name "Siwan". On January 7, 2010, the group debuted with their EP, Nativity under the name ZE:A. He is also a member of the sub-unit, ZE:A-Five.

=== 2012–2023: Venture into acting and recognition ===
Yim joined the cast of the historical drama Moon Embracing the Sun (2012), playing the young version of Heo Yeom. The series surpassed 40% ratings and gained "national drama" status, launching Yim to fame. Later that year, he was cast in the revenge drama Man from the Equator. This was followed by the sitcom Standby (2012) and Drama Special Waiting for Love (2013).

In 2013, he starred in the courtroom drama film The Attorney, playing a young student activist detained and tortured by the police on accusations of being a communist sympathizer. The film was a critical and commercial success, selling more than 11 million tickets to become the 8th best-selling Korean film of all time. He won Best New Actor at the Max Movie Awards and the Marie Claire Film Festival.

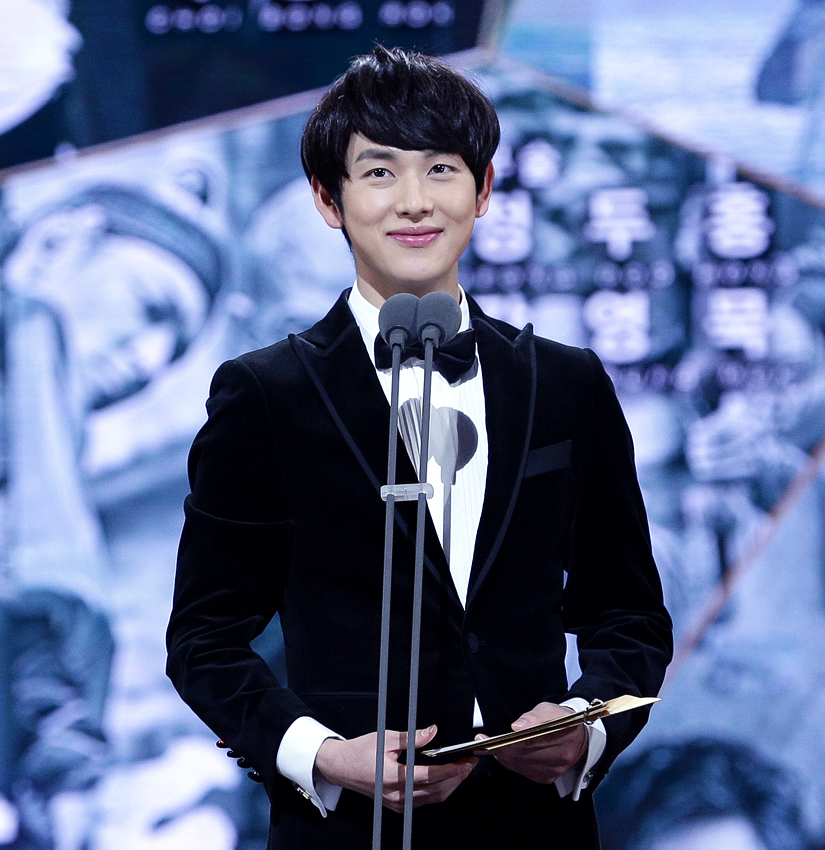
Yim in 2014

Yim returned to television in 2014 and starred in two drama series. In Triangle, he played the youngest of three brothers separated at childhood, who grew up in a cold chaebol household. While in the webtoon adaptation and cable hit drama Misaeng: Incomplete Life, he reprised his role in Incomplete Life: Prequel as a former baduk player who learns to adapt to Korean corporate culture. Misaeng: Incomplete Life was a commercial hit, recorded high viewership ratings with a peak of 8.4%; and was dubbed a "cultural phenomenon". Yim won the Excellence Award in acting at the 4th APAN Star Awards for his performance, as well as Best New Actor awards at the 9th Cable TV Broadcasting Awards and the 51st Baeksang Arts Awards.

Yim then took on his first big-screen leading role in the war drama film A Melody to Remember (2016), playing a good-hearted soldier who is hoping for a miracle even in a desperate situation. He was also cast in the Chinese-South Korean web drama My Catman alongside Chae Soo-bin and Kim Myung-soo.

In a departure from his usual "nice guy" roles, Yim plays a cunning conman in the crime caper movie One Line (2017). He deviated even farther from his clean-cut image in The Merciless (2017), a crime action film where he played an undercover cop who works for a drug-smuggling ring. Yim was invited to the Cannes Film Festival for the first time. The same year, Yim starred in the historical melodrama The King in Love, playing an ambitious crown prince.

In 2019, Yim was cast in the thriller drama Hell Is Other People, based on the webtoon of the same name. This marks his first project after enlistment. The same year, he was cast in the period sports film Boston 1947. In 2020, he was also cast in the disaster film Emergency Declaration. It was invited to the out of competition section of the 74th Cannes Film Festival to be held from 6 to July 17, 2021 and had its world premiere on July 16. It was slated to release theatrically in January 2022, but due to a new wave of the COVID-19 pandemic its release was delayed. It was finally released theatrically in South Korea on August 3, 2022 Yim's acting performance as the bioterrorist on the airplane earnings praise by critics and audience. He was nominated for Best Supporting Actor at the 59th Baeksang Arts Awards, 43rd Blue Dragon Film Awards, 58th Grand Bell Awards, 16th Asian Film Awards and won at the 31st Buil Film Awards and Korean Film Producers Association Awards. He also received Buldak Rising Star Award at the London Asian Film Festival.

In 2020, Yim starred in JTBC's romance drama Run On. He also recorded the song "Me and You" for the soundtrack of the series; it was the first time in four years since he had participated in a series' soundtrack. He participated not only in singing but also in writing the lyrics.

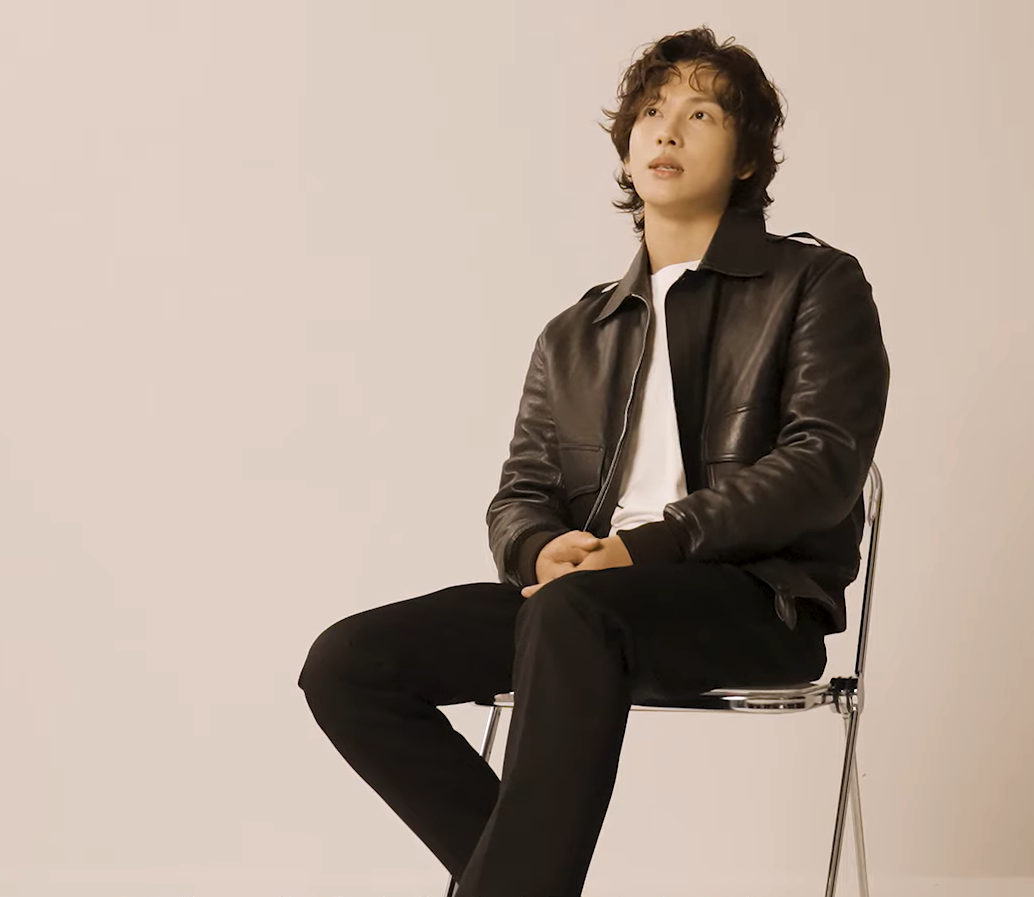
Yim in 2022

In 2022, Yim starred in the Wavve's thriller drama Tracer, which flew under many Korean drama fans' radars when it was released that year. In it, he portrays Hwang Dong-joo, a shameless and harsh former accountant who works for the Korean tax collection services in the government, specifically in the National Tax Service. Yim was nominated for Best Actor at the 58th Baeksang Arts Awards, 8th APAN Star Awards, 1st Blue Dragon Series Awards, 13th Korea Drama Awards, Asia Contents Awards and 2022 MBC Drama Awards. He also appeared in the ENA drama Summer Strike.

In 2023, Yim held a fan concert called Yim Si Wan 2023 'Why I Am in Seoul' on February 11. It was revealed that he was cast for the second and third seasons of the hit Netflix series Squid Game. He then starred in the Coupang Play's teen comedy drama Boyhood. He played the role of Jang Byeong-tae, a loner who was mistaken for Buyeo Iljjang on the first day of school. He was nominated for Best Actor at the 60th Baeksang Arts Awards.

=== 2025–present: Return to music and new management ===
On October 13, 2025, it was officially announced that Yim would make his debut as a soloist under SMart, which is an affiliate label of SM Entertainment, marking his return to music. In November 2025, he signed under The Black Label.

== Personal life ==
=== Military service ===
On July 11, 2017, Yim officially began his mandatory military service. He was chosen to be an assistant instructor at the division's recruit training battalion due to his good performance. Yim fulfilled his mandatory military service as an active-duty soldier in the 25th Infantry Division of the Republic of Korea Army from July 11, 2017, until his discharge on March 27, 2019.

== Other ventures ==
=== Endorsements ===
On October 30, 2023, Narwal a smart robot vacuum cleaner company announced that Yim would be their brand ambassador, who has the image of a sincere and strict child, as its model for its first campaign advertisement with the message "Narwal who understands me". On April 12, 2024, Nongshim announced that they have selected Yim as the new model for Baeksan mountain bottled water and will launch a new advertisement. A Nongshim official said they chose him because his healthy and lively image goes well with the dynamism of Baeksan, a Yongcheon water from Paektu Mountain that rises on its own and he is an actor who is widely loved by various generations.

=== Ambassadorship ===
- 2012 Honorary Ambassador of Korea Tourism Organization
- 2012 Brand Ambassador of Tissot Swatch Group Korea
- 2012 Brand Ambassador of Pret-a-Porter Busan (Busan Fashion Week)
- 2012 Honorary Ambassador of Woosong University of Informatics
- 2013 Brand Youth Ambassador of Gyeonggi Province
- 2014 High Ambassador of Korea International Trade Association
- 2014 Brand Ambassador of FinTech Financial Technology Group Inc
- 2023 PR Ambassador for the 2024 World Team Table Tennis Championships in Busan

=== Philanthropy ===
On March 4, 2022, Yim donated ₩20 million to the Embassy of Ukraine, Seoul to help Ukrainian victims of Russian invasion, he also booked a 4-bed dormitory in Kiiwu (Kyiv) for about a month, from March 7 to April 4 to help Ukrainian war victims. On August 10, 2022, Yim donated ₩20 million to help those affected by the 2022 South Korea floods through the Hope Bridge Korea Disaster Relief Association. On February 8, 2023, Yim donated ₩10 million to help 2023 Turkey–Syria earthquakes through Hope Bridge National Disaster Relief Association. On July 17, 2023, Yim donated ₩30 million to help those affected by the 2023 South Korea floods through to the Hope Bridge National Disaster Relief Association.

On November 3, 2023, Yim donated ₩10 million to build Korea's first Lou Gehrig nursing hospital. He participated in the 2023 Chuncheon Marathon held in Chuncheon, Gangwon-do on the 29th of last month and completed the 10 km course in 45 minutes and 21 seconds. He also joined Sean's pledge to donate ₩1000 per meter and gave ₩10 million to the Seungil Hope Foundation. This donation would be used to build Korea's first Lou Gehrig Care Hospital.

== Discography ==
=== Extended plays ===
List of extended plays, with selected details, chart positions, and sales
Title	Details	Peak chart positions	Sales
Title	Details	KOR	Sales
The Reason	Released: December 5, 2025; Label: SMArt; Formats: CD, digital download, streaming	18	KOR: 8,923

=== Singles ===
List of singles, showing year released, selected peak positions, sales figures, and name of the album
Title	Year	Peak chart positions	Sales	Album
Title	Year	KOR DL	Sales	Album
As lead artist
"The Reason"	2025	—	—N/a	The Reason
Collaborations
"Tick-Tock Tick-Tock" (째깍째깍) (with Jo Hyun-ah of Urban Zakapa)	2017	—	—N/a	Non-album single
"Fly Your Kite (Vocal. Im Siwan)" (연날리기) (with Leechanhyukvideo)	2023	—	—N/a	Umbrella
"Win for You" (with Winter)	2023	185	—N/a	ITTF World Team Table Tennis Championships; Finals Busan 2024 Official Theme Song
Soundtrack appearances
"Be Alright" (그래도..그래서..)	2014	42	KOR: 38,064	Misaeng: Incomplete Life OST Part 5
"My Heart" (내 마음은)	2017	—	—N/a	The King in Love OST Part 4
"I And You" (나 그리고 너)	2021	48	—N/a	Run On OST Part 12
"Fire" (파이어)	2022	—	—N/a	Tracer OST Part 5
"Take Me Home" (테이크 미 홈)	2024	117	—N/a	Boyhood OST Part 4
"—" denotes releases that did not chart or were not released in that region.

== Filmography ==
=== Film ===
Year	Title	Role	Notes	Ref.
2013	Incomplete Life: Prequel	Jang Geu-rae	Short film	
2013	The Attorney	Park Jin-woo		
2014	Rio 2	Blu	Voice; Korean dub	
2016	A Melody to Remember	Han Sang-ryul		
2017	One Line	Lee Min-jae		
2017	The Merciless	Jo Hyun-soo		
2022	Emergency Declaration	Ryu Jin-seok		
2023	Unlocked	Oh Jun-yeong / Woo Jun-yeong		
2023	Honey Sweet	Couple guy	Cameo	
2023	Road to Boston	Suh Yun-bok		
2025	Mantis	Lee Han-ul / Mantis		

=== Television series ===
Year	Title	Role	Notes	Ref.
2010	Prosecutor Princess	Club man	Cameo (Ep. 2)	
2010	All About Marriage	Trainee	Cameo (Ep. 18)	
2010	Gloria	Trainee	Cameo (Ep. 11 & 14)	
2012	Moon Embracing the Sun	young Heo-yeom		
2012	Man from the Equator	young Lee Jang-il		
2012	Standby	Im Si-wan		
2012	Reply 1997	ROTC Seoul man	Cameo (Ep. 4)	
2013	A Bit of Love	young Jeong Woo-sung	Special appearance	
2013	Waiting for Love	Jung Jin-kook	KBS Drama Special	
2014	Triangle	Jang Dong-woo / Yoon Yang-ha		
2014	Misaeng: Incomplete Life	Jang Geu-rae		
2016	My Catman	Ji-baek		
2017	The King in Love	Wang Won		
2019	Hell Is Other People	Yoon Jong-woo		
2020–2021	Run On	Ki Seon-gyeom		
2022	Tracer	Hwang Dong-joo		
2022	Thirty-Nine	Im Si-wan	Cameo (Ep. 10)	
2022	Summer Strike	Ahn Dae-beom		
2022–2023	Missing: The Other Side	Mysterious man	Season 2 (Cameo; Ep. 14)	
2023	Boyhood	Jang Byung-tae		
2024–2025	Squid Game	Lee Myung-gi (Player 333)	Season 2–3	
2026	Love in Disguise	Yun Yi-jun		

=== Television shows ===
Year	Title	Role	Notes	Ref.
2012	Birth of a Family	Cast member		
2013	Law of the Jungle: Micronesia	Cast member		
2021	House on Wheels	Cast member	Season 2	
2023	Actors on a Journey	Cast member	with Jung Hae-in	
2024	Saturday Night Live Korea	Host	Season 5 – Episode 1	

=== Music video appearances ===
Year	Title	Artist	Ref.
2012	"Secret Love" (시크릿 러브)	Goo Hara	
2012	"For A Year" (일 년째)	Zia	
2014	"Heart Said" (심장이 말했다)	SoReal	
2014	"Whistle" (휘파람)	Acoustic Collabo	

== Musical theater ==
Year	Title	Role	Notes	Ref.
2013	Joseph and the Amazing Technicolor Dreamcoat	Joseph	February 19 – March 12 in Seoul	

== Accolades ==
=== Awards and nominations ===
Name of the award ceremony, year presented, category, nominee of the award, and the result of the nomination
Award ceremony	Year	Category	Nominee / Work	Result	Ref.
APAN Star Awards	2015	Excellence Award, Actor in a Miniseries	Misaeng: Incomplete Life	Won	
APAN Star Awards	2022	Top Excellence Award, Actor in an OTT Drama	Tracer	Nominated	
APAN Star Awards	2022	Popularity Star Award, Actor	Tracer	Nominated	
Asia Artist Awards	2026	Popularity Award – Actor	Yim Si-wan	Pending	
Asia Contents Awards & Global OTT Awards	2022	Best Actor	Tracer	Nominated	
Asia Contents Awards & Global OTT Awards	2024	Best Actor	Boyhood	Nominated	
Asia Contents Awards & Global OTT Awards	2024	People's Choice Award – Male	Boyhood	Nominated	
Asian Film Awards	2014	Best Newcomer	The Attorney	Nominated	
Asian Film Awards	2022	Best Supporting Actor	Emergency Declaration	Nominated	
Asia Model Awards	2015	Asia Special Award, Actor	Misaeng: Incomplete Life	Won	
Baeksang Arts Awards	2014	Best New Actor – Film	The Attorney	Nominated	
Baeksang Arts Awards	2014	Best Fashionista Award	The Attorney	Won	
Baeksang Arts Awards	2015	Best New Actor – Television	Misaeng: Incomplete Life	Won	
Baeksang Arts Awards	2022	Best Actor – Television	Tracer	Nominated	
Baeksang Arts Awards	2023	Best Supporting Actor – Film	Emergency Declaration	Nominated	
Baeksang Arts Awards	2024	Best Actor – Television	Boyhood	Nominated	
Blue Dragon Film Awards	2014	Best New Actor	The Attorney	Nominated	
Blue Dragon Film Awards	2014	Popularity Award	The Attorney	Won	
Blue Dragon Film Awards	2022	Best Supporting Actor	Emergency Declaration	Nominated	
Blue Dragon Series Awards	2022	Best Actor	Tracer	Nominated	
Blue Dragon Series Awards	2024	Best Actor	Boyhood	Won	
Blue Dragon Series Awards	2024	OST Popularity Award	"Take Me Home"	Nominated	
Brand Costumer Loyalty Awards	2024	Best Actor – OTT	Boyhood	Nominated	
Buil Film Awards	2014	Best New Actor	The Attorney	Nominated	
Buil Film Awards	2022	Best Supporting Actor	Emergency Declaration	Won	
Buil Film Awards	2023	Best Actor	Unlocked	Nominated	
Cable TV Broadcasting Awards	2015	Best Actor	Misaeng: Incomplete Life	Won	
Director's Cut Awards	2024	Best Actor – Film	Road to Boston	Nominated	
Grand Bell Awards	2014	Best New Actor	The Attorney	Nominated	
Grand Bell Awards	2014	Popularity Award	The Attorney	Won	
Grand Bell Awards	2022	Best Supporting Actor	Emergency Declaration	Nominated	
Grand Bell Awards	2023	Best Actor	Road to Boston	Nominated	
InStyle Star Icon	2016	Best Idol Actor	Misaeng: Incomplete Life, A Melody to Remember	Won	
Korea Drama Awards	2012	Best New Actor	Moon Embracing the Sun	Nominated	
Korea Drama Awards	2015	Top Excellence Award, Actor	Misaeng: Incomplete Life	Nominated	
Korea Drama Awards	2015	Actor Special Jury Prize	Misaeng: Incomplete Life	Won	
Korea Drama Awards	2022	Top Excellence Award, Actor	Tracer	Nominated	
Korea Drama Awards	2024	Top Excellence Award, Actor	Boyhood	Won	
Korea Drama Awards	2024	Hot Star Award – Male	Boyhood	Nominated	
Korea First Brand Awards	2026	Actor – OTT	Yim Si-wan	Won	
Korea First Brand Awards	2026	Actor (Vietnam)	Yim Si-wan	Won	
Korean Film Actor's Association Star Night - Korea Top Star Awards Ceremony	2014	Popularity Award	The Attorney	Won	
Korean Film Producers Association Awards	2022	Best Supporting Actor	Emergency Declaration	Won	
LA Web Fest	2023	Best Actor – Long Form Series	Summer Strike	Nominated	
London Asian Film Festival	2022	Buldak Rising Star Award	Emergency Declaration	Won	
Max Movie Awards	2014	Best New Actor	The Attorney	Won	
Max Movie Awards	2014	Best Supporting Actor	The Attorney	Nominated	
Max Movie Awards	2016	Rising Star Award	Yim Si-wan	Won	
Busan International Film Festival with Marie Claire Asia Star Awards	2014	Best New Actor	The Attorney	Won	
Busan International Film Festival with Marie Claire Asia Star Awards	2024	Beyond Cinema Award	Boyhood	Won	
MBC Drama Awards	2012	Moon Embracing the Sun	Best New Actor	Nominated	
MBC Drama Awards	2012	Moon Embracing the Sun	Popularity Award	Nominated	
MBC Drama Awards	2014	Best New Actor	Triangle	Won	
MBC Drama Awards	2017	Top Excellence Award, Actor in a Monday-Tuesday Drama	The King in Love	Nominated	
MBC Drama Awards	2022	Top Excellence Award, Actor in a Miniseries	Tracer	Nominated	
MBC Entertainment Awards	2012	Best Newcomer in a Sitcom	Standby	Won	
Mnet 20's Choice Awards	2012	20's Booming Star	Moon Embracing the Sun	Nominated	
Soompi Awards	2018	Actor of the Year	The King in Love	Nominated	
Seoul WebFest Awards	2017	Best Actor	My Catman	Nominated	
The Musical Awards	2013	Best New Actor	Joseph and the Amazing Technicolor Dreamcoat	Nominated	
The Seoul Awards	2017	Popularity Award, Actor	The Merciless	Won	
tvN10 Awards	2016	Made in tvN, Actor in Drama	Misaeng: Incomplete Life	Nominated	

=== State honors ===
Name of country, year given, and name of honor
Country	Award Ceremony	Year	Honor Or Award	Ref.
South Korea	Financial Services Commission	2015	Special Achievement Award	
South Korea	Korean Popular Culture and Arts Awards (Note: Honors are given at the Korean Popular Culture and Arts Awards, arranged by the Korea Creative Content Agency and hosted by the Ministry of Culture, Sports and Tourism. They are awarded to those who have contributed to the arts and South Korea's pop culture.)	2023	Minister of Culture, Sports and Tourism Commendation	

=== Listicles ===
Name of publisher, year listed, name of listicle, and placement
Publisher	Year	Listicle	Placement	Ref.
Cine 21	2020	Actors to watch out for in 2021	6th (Note: Im Si-wan mentioned together with, Kang Dong-won, Kang Ha-neul, Gong Yoo, Koo Kyo-hwan, Kim Soo-hyun, Kim Woo-bin, Ryu Seung-ryong, Park Jeong-min, Byun Yo-han, Song Kang, Song Kang-ho, Teo Yoo, Lee Je-hoon, Jung Sung-hwa, Jung Woo-sung, Son Suk-ku, Hyun Bin)	
Cine 21	2021	Actors to watch out for in 2022	(Note: Im Si-wan mentioned together with Son Suk-ku, Song Joong-ki, Park Seo-joon and Teo Yoo)	
Cine 21	2023	Actors to watch out for in 2024	1st	
Forbes	2015	Korea Power Celebrity 40	35th	
Korean Film Council	2021	Korean Actors 200 (Note: Introduces 200 actors that best represent the present and future of Korean cinema to the people in the film industry all over the world.)	Included	
Star News	2023	Best Idol-Actor of the Year (Male)	2nd	
