= The Emperor: Owner of the Mask =

2017 South Korean television series

- Promotional poster
- Hangul: 군주 - 가면의 주인
- Hanja: 君主 - 假面의 主人
- Lit.: Ruler - Master of the Mask
- RR: Gunju - gamyeonui juin
- MR: Kunju - kamyŏnŭi chuin
- Genre: Historical; Political; Melodrama; Romance
- Created by: Kim Kyung-hee
- Written by: Park Hye-jin
- Directed by: Noh Do-chul; Park Won-gook
- Starring: Yoo Seung-ho; Kim So-hyun; Kim Myung-soo; Yoon So-hee; Huh Joon-ho; Park Chul-min
- Music by: Jeon Chang-yeop
- Opening theme: "Emperor Opening Title" by V.A
- Ending theme: "For A While" by Hwang Chi-yeul
- Country of origin: South Korea
- Original language: Korean
- No. of episodes: 40 (Note: In order to circumvent Korean laws that prevent commercial breaks in the middle of an episode, what would previously have been aired as single 70 minute episodes are now being repackaged as two 35 minute episodes, with two episodes being shown each night with a commercial break between the two.)

Production
- Executive producer: Kim Kyung-hee
- Producers: Jung Chan-hee; Sim Jung-woon; Bae Jung-hoon
- Camera setup: Single-camera
- Running time: 30 minutes
- Production companies: People Story Company; Huayi Brothers

Original release
- Network: MBC TV
- Release: May 10 – July 13, 2017

The Emperor: Owner of the Mask (Korean: 군주 - 가면의 주인) is a South Korean television series starring Yoo Seung-ho, Kim So-hyun, Kim Myung-soo, Yoon So-hee, Huh Joon-ho, and Park Chul-min. It aired on MBC TV from May 10, to July 13, 2017, every Wednesday and Thursday at 22:00 (KST).

== Plot ==
During the Joseon period, the long-awaited son of King Yi Yoon is born, but in exchange for his life, the king will hand over the power of the Bureau of Water Supply to the secret society "Pyunsoo Group" that controls the government. The king covers the Crown Prince's face with a mask and raises him secretly in order to protect him from the Pyunsoo Group.

Sixteen years later, Crown Prince Yi Sun, who grew up as a respectable young man, removes his mask and left the palace secretly to go to the town to find out why he has been masked since he was born. The purpose is to meet scholar Master Woo Bo who is the only person who knows why.

Crown Prince Yi Sun then meets high-ranking official's daughter Lady Han Ga-eun and a young man who has the same name as himself, Yi Sun, and deepens friendship with them.

After some time, the secret society Pyunsoo Group assassinates King Yi Yoon but Crown Prince Yi Sun escaped. The Pyunsoo Group put a fake king on the throne and controls this king and the whole Imperial Court by using a suspicious drug with poisonous properties. Having witnessed the people's suffering, the Crown Prince decides to devote himself to fight the Pyunsoo Group and reclaim his throne.

== Cast ==
=== Main ===
- Yoo Seung-ho as Crown Prince Yi Sun

The real Crown Prince of Joseon and also known as the Chief Peddler.

- Kim So-hyun as Lady Han Ga-eun

Daughter of Deputy Magistrate Han, one of the students of Master Woo Bo and childhood friend of commoner Yi Sun. She has wide knowledge of medicinal herbs.

- Kim Myung-soo as Commoner Yi-sun

Initially worked as a water deliverer at the Bureau of Water Supply, student of Master Woo Bo and a childhood friend of Lady Ga Eun. He was planted as a fake king by Pyeon-soo group and this slowly gave birth to his greed and desire to become the true king of Joseon in order to earn Ga-eun's feelings, as partially driven by his jealousy towards Crown Prince Yi Sun and the manipulation of Kim Dae-mok.

- Yoon So-hee as Kim Hwa-gun

Granddaughter of Pyunsoo Group leader Dae-mok and head of all the merchants in Joseon. She fell in love with the Crown Prince at first sight. And, remained loyal towards the Crown Prince till the end.

- Huh Joon-ho as Kim Dae-mok

Head of the secret society "Pyunsoo Group." He controls King Yi Yoon and the imperial court by using a mysterious drug with poisonous properties. He forgives no one when they betray Pyunsoo Group, and he even went as far as to murder his own granddaughter for betraying him and showing loyalty to the Crown Prince.

- Park Chul-min as Master Woo-bo

A scholar in medicine and well-versed in Western knowledge.

=== Supporting ===
- Kim Byung-chul as Kim Woo-jae. He is the only son of Dae-mok and also the leader of Pyungsoohwe group. He is the father of Hwa-gun. He is foolish and often despised by his father Dae-mok, but he is very caring towards his daughter.
- Kim Jong-soo as Joo Jin-myung
- Do Yong-goo as Choi Sung-gi
- Jung Kyu-soo as Heo Yoo-gun
- Kim Young-woong as Jo Tae-ho. The head of Water Bureau.
- Kim Seo-kyung as Gon, the loyal bodyguard of Lady Hwa-gun. Later, it was revealed that he was in love with his Lady, Hwa-gun. Out of love for Hwa-gun, he granted her last wish before her death by switching his allegiance to the Crown Prince and protects him from Dae-mok.
- Park Ki-ryung as Mr. Jang
- Lee Ki-young
- Um Hyo-sup

People around Crown Prince Yi Sun

- Shin Hyun-soo as Yi Chung-woon, Crown Prince Lee Sun's loyal personal bodyguard. He is the son of the dead king Yi Yoon's personal bodyguard, Bum Woo. Crown Prince Yi Sun and Chung woon grew up together.
- Bae Yoo-ram as Park Moo-ha, adjunct official who was arrested together with Deputy Magistrate Han. He was loyal towards the Crown Prince till the very end.
- Lee Chae-young as Mae-chang, a court lady who disguises as a gisaeng. Joseon's expert on poetry and an experienced gayageum player. Initially, she was a lady of mysterious origin and identity. But, later it reveals that she is the daughter of the head eunuch and she tries to help the Crown Prince, but her father forbids her to. She used to work on Pyungsoohwe field of poisons at an early age, but she escaped.

Family of commoner Yi-sun

- Park Hyun-suk as Yoo Sun-daek, commoner Yi-sun's mother.
- Jung Hae-kyun as commoner Yi-sun's father
- Go Na-hee as Kko-mool, commoner Yi-sun's younger sister

Royal palace

- Kim Myung-soo (1966) as King Yi Yoon, Crown Prince Yi Sun's father. He wanted to become the king and thus his greed made him to become a part of Pyungsoo group. He assassinated his father and became the king.
- Kim Sun-kyung as the Queen, Crown Prince Yi Sun's legal mother (Royal Mother). She was the one to poison the Crown Prince.
- Choi Ji-na as Lady Yi Young-bin, Crown Prince Yi Sun's biological mother
- Jung Doo-hong as Yi Bum-woo. He was the personal and loyal bodyguard as well as a childhood friend of the old king, Yi Yoon.
- Song In-guk as Hyun-suk. Initially it is seen, that he is a loyal friend and bodyguard of the fake king Commoner Yi Sun. But later, it was revealed that he was a lackey of Dae-mok.
- Jung Ah-mi as Court Lady Han. She was forever loyal towards the Royal Mother.
- Lee Dae-ro as Chief Eunuch. He is the father of Ma Chaeng. He is neither for the late king nor for the Crown Prince nor for Dae-mok. He was supposedly loyal towards Crown Prince's grandfather/late king's father.

=== Extended ===
- Jeon No-min as Deputy Magistrate Han Kyu-ho, father of Lady Ga Eun. He was a kind and righteous official who was later being executed due to the manipulation of Pyeon-soo group.
- Jin Ki-joo as Choi Kang-seo
- Gong Jung-hwan
- Min Pil-joon as Park Cheon-soo

== Production ==
- Despite differences in tone, the media noted the drama's similarities with KBS2's hit series Love in the Moonlight (2016) as both are set in Joseon era with young lead actors born in 1993 (Moonlight's Park Bo-gum, Emperor's Yoo Seung-ho) and 1999 (Moonlight's Kim Yoo-jung, Emperor's Kim So-hyun). Emperor also co-stars Park Chul-min who had a supporting role in Moonlight. Interestingly, Park Chul-min portrays an antagonist and corrupt official in Moonlight, but in contrast, he plays a righteous man who was a trusted ally of the protagonist Crown Prince Yi Sun in Emperor.
- The first script reading took place on December 23, 2016 at MBC Broadcasting Station in Sangam, Seoul, South Korea. The series was pre-produced with filming commencing in December 2016, and lasted six months. The series reunited Kim So-hyun and Yoo Seung-ho who starred in Missing You (2013), and Kim Myung-soo and Yoon So-hee in The Day After We Broke Up (2016).
- The series was promoted heavily by MBC, with the first teaser released six months before its premiere at the MBC Drama Awards, where leads Yoo and Kim also served as presenters. There were also several exclusive Naver features and V Live broadcasts before and during its run.

== Original soundtrack ==
The Emperor: Owner of the Mask OST

Soundtrack album by Various artists
- Released: 2017
- Genre: Soundtrack
- Language: Korean
- Labels: Plus Media; Danal Entertainment (digital); LOEN Entertainment (physical)
- Producer: Lee Sung-kwon

=== Part 1 ===
No.	Title	Lyrics	Music	Artist	Length
1.	"The Man That Couldn't Cry" (남자라 울지 못했어)	Im Dong-kyun; Good Choice	Kang Dong-un; Im Dong-kyun; Kim Young-sung	Yang Yo-seob (Highlight)	03:45
2.	"The Man That Couldn't Cry" (Inst.)		Kang Dong-un; Im Dong-kyun; Kim Young-sung		03:45
Total length:					07:30

=== Part 2 ===
No.	Title	Lyrics	Music	Artists	Length
1.	"From The First Time You and Me" (처음부터 너와 나)	Vanilla Man (Vanilla Acoustic)	Vanilla Man (Vanilla Acoustic)	Bolbbalgan4	03:25
2.	"From The First Time You and Me" (Inst.)		Vanilla Man (Vanilla Acoustic)		03:25
Total length:					06:50

=== Part 3 ===
No.	Title	Lyrics	Music	Artist	Length
1.	"For A While" (잠시나마)	Jeon Chang-yeob; Black Belt	Black Belt	Hwang Chi-yeul	04:02
2.	"For A While" (Inst.)		Black Belt		04:02
Total length:					08:04

=== Part 4 ===
No.	Title	Lyrics	Music	Artist	Length
1.	"Star And Sun" (별과 해)	Yoon Jin-hyo; Jeon Chang-yeob	Jeon Chang-yeob; Yoon Jin-hyo	Kei (Lovelyz)	03:51
2.	"Star And Sun" (Inst.)		Jeon Chang-yeob; Yoon Jin-hyo		03:51
Total length:					07:42

=== Part 5 ===
No.	Title	Lyrics	Music	Artist	Length
1.	"Between Seasons" (계절사이)	Jeon Chang-yeob; Ryu Won-gwang	Jeon Chang-yeob; Ryu Won-gwang	Kim Yeon-ji	04:36
2.	"Between Seasons" (Inst.)		Jeon Chang-yeob; Ryu Won-gwang		04:36
Total length:					09:12

=== Part 6 ===
No.	Title	Lyrics	Music	Artist	Length
1.	"I'm OK" (괜찮다고)	Good Choice; Yoda	Kim Se-jin; Park Chan	Kim Na-young	03:57
2.	"I'm OK" (Inst.)		Kim Se-jin; Park Chan		03:57
Total length:					07:54

=== Part 7 ===
No.	Title	Lyrics	Music	Artist	Length
1.	"The Tree" (나무)	Yang Yo-seob; Gyuberlake	Yang Yo-seob; Gyuberlake	Yang Yo-seob (Highlight)	03:57
2.	"The Tree" (Inst.)		Yang Yo-seob; Gyuberlake		03:57
Total length:					07:54

=== Part 8 ===
No.	Title	Lyrics	Music	Artist	Length
1.	"The Person Who I Love" (내가 사랑할 사람)	Ahn Soo-wan	Ahn Soo-wan	K.Will	03:48
2.	"The Person Who I Love" (Inst.)		Ahn Soo-wan		03:48
Total length:					07:36

=== Part 9 ===
No.	Title	Lyrics	Music	Artist	Length
1.	"Sparkling" (반짝인다)	Black Belt; Miss Kim	Black Belt; Yang Hong-seob	Hwanhee	03:25
2.	"Sparkling" (Inst.)		Black Belt; Yang Hong-seob		03:25
Total length:					06:50

=== Part 10 ===
No.	Title	Lyrics	Music	Artist	Length
1.	"Flowing Down My Cheeks" (두볼에 흐른다)	Kang Woo-kyung; As You Know	As You Know; Kim Ji-hwan	Seo Young-eun	04:00
2.	"Flowing Down My Cheeks" (Inst.)		As You Know; Kim Ji-hwan		04:00
Total length:					08:00

=== Part 11 ===
No.	Title	Lyrics	Music	Artist	Length
1.	"Affection" (애심)	Major League	Major League	Gavy NJ	04:24
2.	"Affection" (Inst.)		Major League		04:24
Total length:					08:48

=== Part 12 ===
No.	Title	Lyrics	Music	Artist	Length
1.	"Even if I Want" (원하고 원해도)	Black Belt; Good Choice	Black Belt; Yang Hong-seob	ZIA	03:40
2.	"Even if I Want" (Inst.)		Black Belt; Yang Hong-seob		03:40
Total length:					07:20

=== Part 13 ===
No.	Title	Lyrics	Music	Artist	Length
1.	"Only One Person" (단 한사람)	Major League	Major League	Kim Greem	03:36
2.	"Only One Person" (Inst.)		Major League		03:36
Total length:					07:12

=== Part 14 ===
No.	Title	Lyrics	Music	Artist	Length
1.	"It's Okay Even If It's Not Me" (내가 아니어도 좋아)	Good Choice; Red Socks	Red Socks	L (INFINITE)	04:42
2.	"It's Okay Even If It's Not Me" (Inst.)		Red Socks		04:42
Total length:					09:24

=== Part 15 ===
No.	Title	Lyrics	Music	Artist	Length
1.	"Water Orchid" (수란 (水蘭))	As You Know; Major League	As You Know; Major League	Suran	03:39
2.	"Water Orchid" (Inst.)		As You Know; Major League		03:39
Total length:					07:18

=== Part 16 ===
No.	Title	Lyrics	Music	Artist	Length
1.	"Can't You Hear My Heart" (내 맘이 들리지 않니)	Major League; As You Know	Major League	Kim So-hyun	03:29
2.	"Can't You Hear My Heart" (Inst.)		Major League		03:29
Total length:					06:58

=== Part 17 ===
No.	Title	Artist	Length
1.	"Hidden Tears" (가려진 눈물)	U Sung-eun	04:21
2.	"Hidden Tears" (Inst.)		04:21
Total length:			08:42

=== Part 18 ===
No.	Title	Artist	Length
1.	"Looking" (바라보기)	Heo Young-saeng	04:04
2.	"Looking" (Inst.)		04:04
Total length:			08:08

Disc 2:
No.	Title	Artist	Length
1.	"The Emperor : Owner of the Mask" (Opening Title)	Various Artists	4:28
2.	"Anger behind the mask"	Various Artists	1:58
3.	"Advance of the monarch"	Various Artists	3:56
4.	"Battle for blood"	Various Artists	2:05
5.	"Bright Mind"	Various Artists	2:50
6.	"Chaotic Tension"	Various Artists	2:41
7.	"Carrying out"	Various Artists	2:38
8.	"Conspiracy"	Various Artists	2:37
9.	"Destiny Waltz"	Various Artists	3:37
10.	"Decision"	Various Artists	2:27
11.	"Gauns Sonata"	Various Artists	3:44
12.	"Kingdom's gate"	Various Artists	3:53
13.	"Love of the monarch"	Various Artists	4:44
14.	"Longing"	Various Artists	2:53
15.	"Monarch pizz comic"	Various Artists	2:48
16.	"Pain Hearts"	Various Artists	3:25
17.	"Ramification"	Various Artists	3:29
18.	"Rattle"	Various Artists	2:15
19.	"Situation"	Various Artists	2:46
20.	"Strong Strike"	Various Artists	1:51
21.	"Toxic Flower"	Various Artists	2:31
22.	"The beginning of the fate"	Various Artists	2:44
23.	"The space of secret"	Various Artists	3:09

=== Chart performance ===
Songs

Title	Year	Peak chart positions	Sales	Remarks
Title	Year	KOR Gaon	Sales	Remarks
"The Man That Couldn't Cry" (Yang Yo-seob (Highlight))	2017	77	KOR: 27,015	Part 1
"From The First Time You and Me" (Bolbbalgan4)	2017	4	KOR: 524,397+	Part 2
"For A While" (Hwang Chi-yeul)	2017	64	KOR: 24,671	Part 3
"The Person Who I Love" (K.Will)	2017	89	KOR: 21,644	Part 8

== Reception ==
Despite being touted as "the next Love in the Moonlight", The Emperor: Owner of the Mask failed to emulate the latter's success and to achieve the same ratings, despite the extensive promotion and hype the series received before its premiere. However, while its competitor, during some weeks, managed to outperform it in some categories, such as the 20-49 year old demographic, as well as streaming, popularity and brand reputation charts, the latter enjoyed modest viewership, while The Emperor: Owner of the Mask still managed to top the ratings in its time slot. William Schwartz of HanCinema stated that the series is "irredeemably stupid", adding that "...the obstacles the characters run into are never clearly defined. It's one of the reasons why the resolutions in this drama are so unsatisfying. There's no tension." Despite some expressing dissatisfaction with the story and the production as a whole, viewers praised the performances of the cast.

== Ratings ==
In the table below, the blue numbers represent the lowest ratings and the red numbers represent the highest ratings.

Ep.	Broadcast date	Average audience share			
Ep.	Broadcast date	TNmS Ratings		AGB Nielsen	
Ep.	Broadcast date	Nationwide	Seoul	Nationwide	Seoul
1	May 10, 2017	8.8% (9th)	10.0% (5th)	9.7% (6th)	10.5% (5th)
2	May 10, 2017	10.1% (6th)	10.9% (4th)	11.6% (4th)	12.1% (4th)
3	May 11, 2017	10.4% (8th)	11.5% (6th)	10.5% (6th)	11.2% (5th)
4	May 11, 2017	10.8% (6th)	11.9% (5th)	12.6% (4th)	13.4% (4th)
5	May 17, 2017	8.5% (12th)	10.4% (6th)	11.2% (5th)	11.8% (5th)
6	May 17, 2017	9.2% (10th)	11.0% (5th)	12.5% (4th)	12.9% (4th)
7	May 18, 2017	10.4% (6th)	11.8% (5th)	12.0% (5th)	12.9% (5th)
8	May 18, 2017	11.6% (5th)	13.1% (4th)	13.4% (4th)	14.2% (3rd)
9	May 24, 2017	10.6% (8th)	10.9% (6th)	11.9% (6th)	12.7% (5th)
10	May 24, 2017	11.7% (5th)	12.6% (4th)	13.8% (4th)	15.2% (3rd)
11	May 25, 2017	11.1% (7th)	11.7% (5th)	12.1% (6th)	13.2% (5th)
12	May 25, 2017	12.3% (5th)	13.3% (4th)	13.8% (4th)	15.1% (3rd)
13	May 31, 2017	11.8% (6th)	13.8% (4th)	11.7% (6th)	12.2% (4th)
14	May 31, 2017	12.8% (6th)	15.7% (3rd)	13.6% (4th)	14.5% (3rd)
15	June 1, 2017	12.0% (6th)	14.5% (5th)	12.0% (6th)	12.6% (5th)
16	June 1, 2017	13.4% (5th)	15.8% (2nd)	13.6% (4th)	14.2% (3rd)
17	June 7, 2017	11.6% (6th)	13.0% (5th)	10.9% (7th)	11.6% (5th)
18	June 7, 2017	12.4% (5th)	14.0% (3rd)	11.9% (5th)	11.0% (6th)
19	June 8, 2017	11.0% (7th)	13.0% (5th)	11.2% (6th)	11.2% (6th)
20	June 8, 2017	11.4% (6th)	14.0% (4th)	12.2% (5th)	12.1% (5th)
21	June 14, 2017	11.8% (5th)	13.0% (5th)	11.3% (5th)	11.8% (5th)
22	June 14, 2017	13.0% (4th)	14.5% (2nd)	13.0% (4th)	13.8% (3rd)
23	June 15, 2017	10.3% (5th)	11.3% (5th)	11.3% (5th)	11.3% (5th)
24	June 15, 2017	12.0% (4th)	13.2% (3rd)	13.4% (4th)	13.2% (4th)
25	June 21, 2017	10.3% (8th)	11.5% (5th)	10.6% (6th)	10.8% (7th)
26	June 21, 2017	11.8% (5th)	13.0% (4th)	13.2% (4th)	13.5% (3rd)
27	June 22, 2017	10.0% (9th)	11.9% (5th)	10.8% (6th)	11.4% (5th)
28	June 22, 2017	11.6% (5th)	14.1% (3rd)	12.2% (4th)	12.4% (4th)
29	June 28, 2017	9.6% (7th)	11.0% (5th)	10.2% (6th)	10.1% (5th)
30	June 28, 2017	11.2% (4th)	13.7% (3rd)	12.2% (4th)	12.3% (4th)
31	June 29, 2017	10.5% (6th)	12.6% (4th)	11.9% (5th)	11.9% (5th)
32	June 29, 2017	12.2% (4th)	14.5% (2nd)	14.4% (4th)	14.6% (3rd)
33	July 5, 2017	12.1% (6th)	14.0% (4th)	12.6% (5th)	13.3% (5th)
34	July 5, 2017	14.0% (4th)	14.6% (3rd)	13.6% (4th)	14.5% (4th)
35	July 6, 2017	12.9% (5th)	15.2% (4th)	12.8% (5th)	13.5% (5th)
36	July 6, 2017	14.7% (4th)	16.6% (3rd)	14.9% (3rd)	15.2% (2nd)
37	July 12, 2017	15.5% (5th)	18.0% (2nd)	13.2% (5th)	13.9% (5th)
38	July 12, 2017	17.6% (3rd)	20.3% (1st)	14.5% (4th)	15.2% (2nd)
39	July 13, 2017	14.4% (5th)	16.1% (4th)	13.3% (5th)	13.5% (5th)
40	July 13, 2017	16.0% (3rd)	18.4% (2nd)	14.4% (3rd)	14.7% (3rd)
Average		11.5%	13.51%	12.4%	13.19%

== Awards and nominations ==
Year	Award	Category	Recipient	Result	Ref
2017	10th Korea Drama Awards	Best Drama	The Emperor: Owner of the Mask	Won	
2017	10th Korea Drama Awards	Best Production Director	Noh Do-cheol	Nominated	
2017	10th Korea Drama Awards	Best Screenwriter Award	Park Hye-jin	Won	
2017	10th Korea Drama Awards	Excellence Award	Jeon No-min	Won	
2017	10th Korea Drama Awards	Best New Actor	Kim Myung-soo	Nominated	
2017	10th Korea Drama Awards	KDA Award	Huh Joon-ho	Won	
2017	1st The Seoul Awards	Best New Actress	Yoon So-hee	Won	
2017	19th Mnet Asian Music Awards	Best OST	Bolbbalgan4 ("You and Me from the Start")	Nominated	
2017	9th Melon Music Awards	Best OST	Bolbbalgan4 ("You and Me from the Start")	Nominated	
2017	Korea Hallyu Awards	Popular Culture Awards	Kim So-hyun	Won	
2017	44th MBC Drama Awards	Grand Prize (Daesang)	Huh Joon-ho	Nominated	
2017	44th MBC Drama Awards	Grand Prize (Daesang)	Yoo Seung-ho	Nominated	
2017	44th MBC Drama Awards	Drama of the Year	The Emperor: Owner of the Mask	Nominated	
2017	44th MBC Drama Awards	Top Excellence Award, Actor in a Miniseries	Huh Joon-ho	Nominated	
2017	44th MBC Drama Awards	Top Excellence Award, Actor in a Miniseries	Yoo Seung-ho	Won	
2017	44th MBC Drama Awards	Top Excellence Award, Actress in a Miniseries	Kim So-hyun	Nominated	
2017	44th MBC Drama Awards	Excellence Award, Actor in a Miniseries	Kim Myung-soo	Nominated	
2017	44th MBC Drama Awards	Excellence Award, Actress in a Miniseries	Yoon So-hee	Nominated	
2017	44th MBC Drama Awards	Golden Acting Award, Actor in a Miniseries	Park Chul-min	Nominated	
2017	44th MBC Drama Awards	Golden Acting Award, Actress in a Miniseries	Kim Seon-kyung	Won	
2017	44th MBC Drama Awards	Male Popularity Award	Kim Myung-soo	Won	
2017	44th MBC Drama Awards	Female Popularity Award	Kim So-hyun	Won	
2017	44th MBC Drama Awards	Best New Actor	Kim Myung-soo	Nominated	
2017	44th MBC Drama Awards	Best Character Award, Fighting Spirit Acting	Kim Myung-soo	Won	
2017	44th MBC Drama Awards	Best Character Award, Best Villain	Huh Joon-ho	Nominated	
2018	12th Soompi Awards	Actor of the Year	Yoo Seung-ho	Nominated	
2018	12th Soompi Awards	Best Idol Actor	Kim Myung-soo	Nominated	
2018	12th Soompi Awards	Best Supporting Actress	Yoon So-hee	Nominated	
2018	12th Soompi Awards	Best Couple	Yoo Seung-ho and Kim So-hyun	Nominated	
