= Unlocked (2023 film) =

South Korean thriller film

- Promotional poster
- Hangul: 스마트폰을 떨어뜨렸을 뿐인데
- Lit.: I just dropped my smartphone
- RR: Seumateuponeul tteoreotteuryeosseul ppuninde
- MR: Sŭmat'ŭp'onŭl ttŏrŏttŭryŏssŭl ppuninde
- Directed by: Kim Tae-joon
- Written by: Kim Tae-joon
- Based on: Stolen Identity by Akira Teshigawara
- Starring: Chun Woo-hee; Yim Si-wan; Kim Hee-won
- Cinematography: Kim Yong-seong
- Edited by: Sin Min-gyeong
- Music by: Dalpalan
- Production companies: Studio N Mizifilm
- Distributed by: Netflix; CJ ENM
- Release date: February 17, 2023
- Running time: 117 minutes
- Country: South Korea
- Language: Korean

Unlocked (Korean: 스마트폰을 떨어뜨렸을 뿐인데; lit. 'I just dropped my smartphone') is a 2023 South Korean psychological thriller film directed by Kim Tae-joon in his directorial debut, starring Chun Woo-hee, Yim Si-wan and Kim Hee-won. It was released on Netflix for streaming on February 17, 2023.

== Plot ==
Lee Na-mi is a young woman who primarily works as a marketer at a start-up company that sells jelly drinks, as well as a part-time job at her father's cafe. One night Na-mi leaves her smartphone on the bus, which is picked up by Oh Jun-yeong, who uses a fake voice app to arrange for Na-mi to pick up her phone at a repair shop the next day. At the repair shop, a masked Jun-yeong fixes Na-mi's broken phone screen and gets the password from her in order to install spyware on her phone and clone it.

Jun-yeong, who has done this before to eight victims, methodically follows Na-mi's daily activities to learn about her life. Using this information, he stages repeated meetings with Na-mi and befriends her by ordering plumade which was private for her and her best friend, Eun-joo. Jun-yeong then buys some business cards as his 'business card' and destroys an old credit card belonging to the dead body. Na-mi's father, Lee Seung-woo, gets suspicious of Jun-yeong, so Jun-yeong tricks his way into Seung-woo's house and keeps him prisoner so he cannot protect Na-mi.

Simultaneously, Detective Woo Ji-man and Kim Jung-ho investigates a murder case involving a dead body found on a remote mountain, and finds clues that implicate Woo Jun-yeong, his son that he hasn't seen in ten years. Ji-man finds Jun-yeong's apartment in Hwangae Residence with evidence of his activities. He uncovers the dead body's identity as Eun Mi-gyeong. However, Jun-yeong tricks him and is able to destroy the evidence. Seven additional bodies of Jun-yeong's victims are found.

Jun-yeong uses Na-mi's social media to leak work information and badmouth her company, causing her to get fired. Na-mi and Eun-joo, try to report the hacking to the police but are told to find evidence of the hack first. Jun-yeong intercepts Na-mi and Eun-joo's message to their friend who is a digital safety expert, and presents himself as the "expert" instead. Jun-yeong manipulates Na-mi to believe that Eun-joo is responsible for the hack; Na-mi and Eun-joo have a falling out, leaving Na-mi completely isolated.

Na-mi remembers going to the repair shop and returns there, where she meets Ji-man and Jung-ho, who have also just tracked down the shop. Na-mi realizes that Jun-yeong was responsible for the spyware and suggests setting a trap for him at her apartment; she is unaware of the danger, as Ji-man doesn't tell her that Jun-yeong is a serial killer. She also finds out that Jun-yeong's full name isn't Oh Jun-yeong, instead it's Woo Jun-yeong. Ji-man and Jung-ho see Jun-yeong approach Na-mi's building but do not recognise him and let him leave.

Believing the trap has failed, Ji-man and Jung-ho send Na-mi to her father's house. Jun-yeong is already there, and he taunts Na-mi, forcing her to drown her father in the bathtub. Unknown to Jun-yeong, Ji-man and Jung-ho have received a signal from Na-mi and return to the house, where they apprehend Jun-yeong. It is revealed that "Jun-yeong" stole the identity of Ji-man's son, the real Woo Jun-yeong, who was his first hacking victim. Na-mi, believing her father is dead, shoots "Jun-yeong". However, Na-mi's father is alive, and Ji-man accepts the blame for shooting "Jun-yeong", who is arrested.

In the aftermath, Na-mi returns to her life, continues working with her father, is reconciled with Eun-joo, and her social media reputation is restored.

== Cast ==
- Chun Woo-hee as Lee Na-mi

A marketer at a startup company.

- Yim Si-wan as Oh Jun-yeong/Woo Jun-yeong

A man who approaches Nami after accidentally picking up her smartphone.

- Kim Hee-won as Woo Ji-man

A detective chasing the culprit of a murder case and Woo Jun-yeong's father.

- Park Ho-san as Lee Seung-woo

Nami's father.

- Kim Ye-won as Jeong Eun-joo

Nami's best friend.

- Oh Hyun-kyung as CEO Oh

The president of a startup company is Nami's senior.

- Jeon Jin-oh as Kim Jung-ho
- Kim Joo-ryoung as Eun-mi
- Gil Hae-yeon as Je-yeon

== Production ==
The film is based on the Japanese novel „Sumaho wo Otoshita-dake-nanoni“ (All I Did Was Drop My Phone) by Akira Teshigawara, which was adapted into 2018 film Stolen Identity. The principal photography began in March 2021 and ended on June 27, 2021.

The film was originally scheduled for the theatrical release by CJ ENM, but later decided to be released on Netflix.

== Awards and nominations ==
| Award ceremony | Category | Nominee / Work | Result |
|---|---|---|---|
| 32nd Buil Film Awards | Best Actor | Yim Si-wan | Nominated |
