= My Catman =

Chinese-South Korean web-drama

- Also known as: 捡来的猫男 검은 고양이
- Genre: Romantic comedy
- Directed by: Park Hyun-jin
- Starring: Im Si-wan; Chae Soo-bin; Kim Myung-soo
- Countries of origin: South Korea; China
- Original language: Korean
- No. of episodes: 10

Production
- Running time: 25 mins
- Production companies: Shanghai Ulike Media; MBC

Original release
- Network: QQLive; MBC
- Release: August 17 – August 18, 2017

My Catman (Chinese: 捡来的猫男) is a Chinese-South Korean web-drama starring Im Si-wan, Chae Soo-bin and Kim Myung-soo. A joint production of South Korea's MBC and China's Shanghai Ulike Media, it is to stream online on Tencent's QQLive.

== Synopsis ==
A light hearted romantic comedy that revolves around a woman named Mi-oh (Chae Soo-bin), a mysterious man named Ji-baek (Im Si-wan) and a top star named Ho-yeon (Kim Myung-soo) and a love triangle that occurs between the three characters.

== Cast ==
- Im Si-wan as Ji-baek
  Ji-baek is described as the mysterious lead character.
- Chae Soo-bin as Mi-oh
  The heroine that gets caught up between Ji-baek and Ho-yeon.
- Kim Myung-soo as Jung Ho-yeon
  The hot top star with a kind personality that takes care of Mi-oh.
- Kim Gyu-seon

== Awards and nominations ==
Year	Award	Category	Nominated work	Result	Ref.
2017	Seoul WebFest Awards	Best Web Series (Korean)	My Catman	Won	
2017	Seoul WebFest Awards	Special Jury Prize	My Catman	Won	
