= Run On (TV series) =

2020 South Korean television series

- Promotional poster
- Hangul: 런 온
- RR: Reon on
- MR: Rŏn on
- Genre: Drama; Romance; Life; Sports
- Created by: JTBC Drama Headquarters
- Written by: Park Shi-hyun
- Directed by: Lee Jae-hoon
- Starring: Yim Si-wan; Shin Se-kyung; Choi Soo-young; Kang Tae-oh
- Music by: Hwang Chan-hee (CP)
- Country of origin: South Korea
- Original language: Korean
- No. of episodes: 16

Production
- Running time: 70 minutes
- Production companies: MAYS Entertainment; Zium Content

Original release
- Network: JTBC
- Release: December 16, 2020 – February 4, 2021

Run On (Korean: 런 온) is a 2020 South Korean television series starring Yim Si-wan, Shin Se-kyung, Choi Soo-young, and Kang Tae-oh. It aired on JTBC from December 16, 2020, to February 4, 2021, and is available for streaming worldwide on Netflix.

== Synopsis ==
Run On tells the love story of Ki Seon-gyeom (Yim Si-wan), a former sprinter who is working to become a sports agent, and Oh Mi-joo (Shin Se-kyung), a subtitle translator.

== Cast ==
=== Main ===
- Yim Si-wan as Ki Seon-gyeom

Innocent but caring, Seon-gyeom was a national Track and Field athlete who always got second place. Seon-gyeom's parents were both very busy and his only sibling was not a companion. As a result, he grew up largely without social interaction. Oh Mi-joo is his first real friend. Despite his lonely existence, he grew up in a privileged environment. He considers the world as friendly.

- Shin Se-kyung as Oh Mi-joo

Oh Mi-joo works as a film translator who loves movies and thinks that every movie has a deep message if you watch it thoroughly. She grew up an orphan. As a result, she had to work very hard in order to get where she is now. She considers the world exceptionally harsh.

- Choi Soo-young as Seo Dan-ah

CEO of Dann Agency. She is a very busy woman and very passionate about what she's doing. Grew up in a family that lacks love, she doesn't know how to express her feelings in the right way so she is known to be rude, sarcastic, and very straight-forward for a while until she learns what it means to have friends and true love. She had to give up the love of soccer because of her family's tight rules. She also has a unique taste in arts, paintings especially.

- Kang Tae-oh as Lee Yeong-hwa

Cheerful and childlike, Yeong-hwa is the only person who could crack open Dan-ah's cold heart. He is a college art student who donates his paintings to a nearby cafe. He has his own way of channeling his feelings into his paintings.

=== Supporting ===
==== Ki Seon-gyeom's Family ====
- Park Yeong-gyu as Ki Jung-do

A very ambitious man who used his family in his games to raise his presidential candidate ratings.

- Cha Hwa-yeon as Yook Ji-woo

A very successful actress who is known as "The Queen of Cannes".

- Ryu Sun-young as Ki Eun-bi

South Korea's number one golfer and Ki Seon-gyeom's older sister. She loves her brother dearly and always had his back whenever he had a fight with their father.

==== Seo Dan-ah's Family ====
- Lee Hwang-eui as Seo Myung-pil, Dan-ah's father and chairman of the Seomyung Group.
- Lee Shin-ki as Seo Myung-min, Dan-ah's half-brother. He is younger than her but their father registered Dan-ah's birthday after he was born.
- Choi Jae-hyun as Seo Tae-woong, Dan-ah's youngest half-brother. He is in the fictional K-pop group AtoZ. It is implied he wasn't born in Korea and had to learn Korean.

==== Track People ====
- Lee Jung-ha as Kim Woo-sik

He is assaulted by Park Gyu-deok and Kim Gi-beom.

- Park Sung-joon as Kwon Young-il, Ki Seon-gyeom's senior.
- Park Sang-won as Park Gyu-deok, assaulted Kim Woo-sik.
- Na Ji-hoon as Kim Gi-beom, assaulted Kim Woo-sik.
- Seo Jin-won as head track and field coach

=== Others ===
- Lee Bong-ryun as Park Mae-yi, Oh Mi-joo's roommate who acts like her older sister.
- Kim Dong-young as Go Ye-joon, Yeong-hwa's best friend, works at the cafe.
- Seo Eun-kyung as Dong Kyung, works at Dann Agency. Ye-chan and Ye-joon's mother.
- Yeon Je-wook as Jung Ji-hyun, Dan-ah's assistant at Dann Agency and Tae-woong's former tutor.
- Bae Yoo-ram as Han Seok-won, Mi-joo's ex-boyfriend. He is a film director.
- Seo Jeong-yeon as Coach Bang, Seon-gyeom's former track coach.
- Kim Si-eun as Go Ye-chan, Ye-joon's younger sister. She likes boxing and is tutored by Yeong-hwa.
- Kim Ye-won as Choi Tae-ri

=== Special appearances ===
- Park Joo-hee as Producer Hui-jin (Ep. 5, 7, 9 & 16)
- Lee Do-yeop as an athletic committee member (Ep. 6)
- Kim Won-hae as bartender (Ep. 8 & 16)
- Kim Seon-ho as Kim Sang-ho (Ep. 16)

== Production ==
Production was halted several times due to the COVID-19 pandemic.

== Original soundtrack ==
Run On OST

Soundtrack album by Various artists
- Released: 2020–2021
- Genre: Soundtrack
- Languages: Korean; English
- Labels: MAYS Entertainment; Zium Content; FLEX M; Kakao M
- Producer: Choi Gap-won (executive)

=== Part 1 ===
Released on December 16, 2020
No.	Title	Lyrics	Music	Artist	Length
1.	"Run To You"	Choi Gap-won; Good Choice	Park Bo-jung; Kim Sung-min (Chansline); Kim Si-won (Chansline); Hwang Chan-hee	Lucy	3:19
2.	"Run To You" (Inst.)		Park Bo-jung; Kim Sung-min (Chansline); Kim Si-won (Chansline); Hwang Chan-hee		3:19
Total length:					6:38

=== Part 2 ===
Released on December 23, 2020
No.	Title	Lyrics	Music	Artist	Length
1.	"Ride Or Die"	Park Bo-jung; Joohoney; Gadeul	Park Bo-jung; Kim Sung-min (Chansline); Kim Si-won (Chansline); Hwang Chan-hee	Kei (Lovelyz), Joohoney (Monsta X)	3:31
2.	"Ride Or Die" (Inst.)		Park Bo-jung; Kim Sung-min (Chansline); Kim Si-won (Chansline); Hwang Chan-hee		3:31
Total length:					7:02

=== Part 3 ===
Released on December 24, 2020
No.	Title	Lyrics	Music	Artist	Length
1.	"Blue Bird"	Gadeul; Jo Yu-ma	Microwave; Choi Young-hoon	Solar (Mamamoo)	3:31
2.	"Blue Bird" (Inst.)		Microwave; Choi Young-hoon		3:31
Total length:					7:02

=== Part 4 ===
Released on December 30, 2020
No.	Title	Lyrics	Music	Artist	Length
1.	"My Light"	Joo Yeon-ho (Chansline); Cho Young-woo (Chansline); Cho Yoo-jin (Chansline); Gadeul	Joo Yeon-ho (Chansline); Cho Young-woo (Chansline); Cho Yoo-jin (Chansline); Hwang Chan-hee	Baek Ji-young	3:44
2.	"My Light" (Inst.)		Joo Yeon-ho (Chansline); Cho Young-woo (Chansline); Cho Yoo-jin (Chansline); Hwang Chan-hee		3:44
Total length:					7:28

=== Part 5 ===
Released on December 31, 2020
No.	Title	Lyrics	Music	Artist	Length
1.	"I Wish It Was You" (너였으면 좋겠어)	Choi Gap-won; Good Choice	Choi Min-ji (Chansline); Kim Sung-min (Chansline); Kim Si-won (Chansline); Hwang Chan-hee	Seol Ho-seung (SURL)	3:29
2.	"I Wish It Was You" (Inst.)		Choi Min-ji (Chansline); Kim Sung-min (Chansline); Kim Si-won (Chansline); Hwang Chan-hee		3:29
Total length:					6:58

=== Part 6 ===
Released on January 6, 2021
No.	Title	Lyrics	Music	Artist	Length
1.	"Sorry"	Kim Soo-eon; Jang Joo-na; Choi Young-ah; Gadeul	Kim Soo-eon; Jang Joo-na; Choi Young-ah; Hwang Chan-hee	2F	3:38
2.	"Sorry" (Inst.)		Kim Soo-eon; Jang Joo-na; Choi Young-ah; Hwang Chan-hee		3:38
Total length:					7:16

=== Part 7 ===
Released on January 7, 2021
No.	Title	Lyrics	Music	Artist	Length
1.	"Priority" (우선순위)	Gadeul; Sunwoo (The Boyz); Park Kang-il; CLEF CREW	Park Kang-il; CLEF CREW	The Boyz (Note: Sung by New, Hyunjae and Sunwoo)	3:56
2.	"Priority" (Inst.)		Park Kang-il; CLEF CREW		3:56
Total length:					7:52

=== Part 8 ===
Released on January 14, 2021
No.	Title	Lyrics	Music	Artist	Length
1.	"Where Are You" (그대는 어디에)	Good Choice; Choi Gap-won	Kim Se-jin	Kim Na-young	3:23
2.	"Where Are You" (Inst.)		Kim Se-jin		3:23
Total length:					6:46

=== Part 9 ===
Released on January 16, 2021
No.	Title	Lyrics	Music	Artist	Length
1.	"Starlight"	SOLE	SOLE; SOQI; Charming Lips	Jeong Hyo-bean	3:06
2.	"Starlight" (Inst.)		SOLE; SOQI; Charming Lips		3:06
Total length:					6:12

=== Part 10 ===
Released on January 20, 2021
No.	Title	Lyrics	Music	Artist	Length
1.	"Falling"	Cho Yoo-jin (Chansline); Choi Young-ah; Jang Kwang-gook; Gadeul	Hwang Chan-hee; Cho Yoo-jin (Chansline); Choi Young-ah; Jang Kwang-gook	Yuju (GFriend)	3:46
2.	"Falling" (Inst.)		Hwang Chan-hee; Cho Yoo-jin (Chansline); Choi Young-ah; Jang Kwang-gook		3:46
Total length:					7:32

=== Part 11 ===
Released on January 21, 2021
No.	Title	Lyrics	Music	Artist	Length
1.	"Breeze" (살랑살랑)	Son Go-eun (MonoTree)	Son Go-eun (MonoTree)	Cherry B	3:08
2.	"Breeze" (Inst.)		Son Go-eun (MonoTree)		3:08
Total length:					6:16

=== Part 12 ===
Released on January 27, 2021
No.	Title	Lyrics	Music	Artist	Length
1.	"I And You" (나 그리고 너)	Im Si-wan; Park Bo-jung	Park Bo-jung; Kim Sung-min (Chansline); Kim Si-won (Chansline); Hwang Chan-hee	Im Si-wan	3:54
2.	"I And You" (Inst.)		Park Bo-jung; Kim Sung-min (Chansline); Kim Si-won (Chansline); Hwang Chan-hee		3:54
Total length:					7:48

== Viewership ==
Run On : South Korea viewers per episode (thousands)

Season	Episode number																Average
Season	1	2	3	4	5	6	7	8	9	10	11	12	13	14	15	16	Average
1	N/A	N/A	N/A	N/A	720	N/A	N/A	868	792	731	725	795	675	718	705	801	N/A

Source: Audience measurement performed nationwide by Nielsen Korea

Average TV viewership ratings
Ep.	Original broadcast date	Average audience share (Nielsen Korea)
1	December 16, 2020	2.145% (25th)
2	December 17, 2020	2.664% (19th)
3	December 23, 2020	2.806% (18th)
4	December 24, 2020	3.025% (15th)
5	December 30, 2020	2.794% (17th)
6	December 31, 2020	2.695% (20th)
7	January 6, 2021	2.753% (19th)
8	January 7, 2021	3.772% (13th)
9	January 13, 2021	3.109% (12th)
10	January 14, 2021	3.081% (13th)
11	January 20, 2021	3.143% (12th)
12	January 21, 2021	3.405% (12th)
13	January 27, 2021	2.716% (15th)
14	January 28, 2021	3.145% (15th)
15	February 3, 2021	3.102% (13th)
16	February 4, 2021	3.623% (7th)
Average		2.999%
In the table above, the blue numbers represent the lowest ratings and the red numbers represent the highest ratings.; This drama airs on a cable channel/pay TV which normally has a relatively smaller audience compared to free-to-air TV/public broadcasters (KBS, SBS, MBC and EBS).
