= Kim Young-chul (comedian) =

South Korean comedian and singer (born 1974)

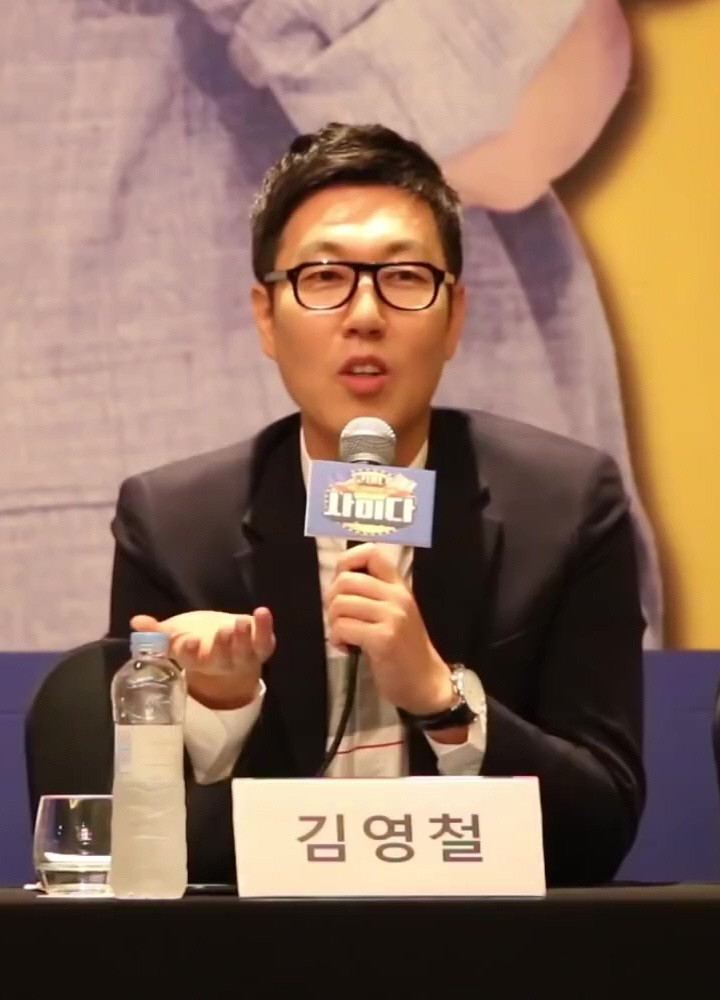
- Kim in 2016
- Born: June 23, 1974 (age 52); Ulsan, South Korea
- Education: Dongguk University
- Employer: Mystic Entertainment

Comedy career
- Years active: 1999–present
- Medium: Stand-up, television
- Genres: Observational, Sketch, Wit, Parody, Slapstick, Drama, Sitcom, Music

Korean name
- Hangul: 김영철
- Hanja: 金榮澈
- RR: Gim Yeongcheol
- MR: Kim Yŏngch'ŏl

Kim Young-chul (Korean: 김영철; born June 23, 1974) is a South Korean comedian and singer.

== Career ==
He is currently a cast member in JTBC's Knowing Bros.

He is also noted for his appearance on the popular Korean variety show Infinite Challenge: his unique character and English-speaking abilities were displayed, and he was the subject of a viral internet meme due to his pronunciation of the phrase "Cheer up, super power" sounding like "Cheer up, super po-wall".

In February 2022, Kim published a human essay 'Cry and Laughed'.

== Discography ==
=== Singles ===
- 2016: "Ring Ring" (with. Hong Jin-young)
- 2017: "An Ordinary Christmas" (with. JeA)
- 2018: "Andenayon" (feat. Wheesung)
- 2019: "Signal Light"
- 2022: "Marc Got It"

== Filmography ==
=== Film ===
Year	Title	Role
2021	There is an Alien Here	Captain Alien

=== Television drama ===
Year	Title	Role
2004–2005	Precious Family	Shin Shin-chul
2006	End of Love	Kim Il-gu
2011	Real School	Kim Young-chul (Inferior class teacher)
2015	Angry Mom	English teacher - Cameo in episode 8
2018	Gangnam Scandal	Choi Seo Hyung's friend - Cameo in episode 17
2020	Dinner Mate	Jjoda Man

=== Television shows ===
Year	Show	Notes
1999	Comedy Everything in the World	Performer
1999	Show! Lucky Train	Performer
1999	Gag Concert	Performer
2006	Hail Quiz	
2009–2013	Strong Heart	
2010	Sweet Night	
2011	Now On My Way to Meet You	
2012	Go Show	
2014	Star Gazing	Regular Member
2015	King of Mask Singer	Contestant as "Pythagorean Theorem" in episode 23
2015	Idol Star Athletics Championships	
2015–2016	Real Men	Comedian special
2015–present	Knowing Bros	
2016	Gibutique	
2016	Madams' Secret Recipe	
2016	Comedy Blue vs. White - Cider	
2016	I Live Alone	Episodes 117–169
2017	Law of the Jungle	Episodes 252–255 at Kota Manado
2017	With You	Season 2, with Song Eun-i
2017	We Have Delivery	
2017	King of Comedy	
2018	Cafeteria	
2018	Friendly Driver	
2018	Where Are You Going, DdaengChul?	Cast member, with Kim Hee-chul, Noh Hong-chul
2018–2019	Grandma's Restaurant in Samcheong-dong	
2018–2019	Eating Out Day	Season 1, cast member
2020	King of Mask Singer	Contestant as "Onion" in episode 239
2022	Rossily in Secret Island	New Year's special entertainment program
2023	Rossily in Secret Ulsan	The second version of the fortified version of Rossily in Secret Island.

=== Web shows ===
Year	Title	Role	Ref.
2022	Extruded Interview	Host	

=== Radio shows ===
Year	Title	Radio Station
2016–present	Kim Young-chul's Power FM	SBS Power FM

== Bibliography ==
Year	Title	Publisher	ISBN
2007	Shameless Young-chul English	Random House Korea	ISBN 9788925514925
2009	The Shameless Young-chul English	Random House Korea	ISBN 9788925530918
2009	Shameless English SET	Dun & Bradstreet	ISBN 9788925532738
2011	FUN FUN Children Young-chul English	Cine21 Books	ISBN 9788984314863

== Awards and nominations ==
Year	Awards	Category	Nominee(s)	Result
2000	7th Korea Entertainment Arts Awards	Male Comedy Award		Won
2000	Baeksang Arts Awards	Best New Variety Performer	Gag Concert	Won
2000	TV Entertainment Awards	Male Gagman Rookie Award		Won
2010	SBS Entertainment Awards	All-round Entertainer Award	Strong Heart	Won
2015	MBC Entertainment Awards	Grand Prize (Daesang)	Real Man	Nominated
2015	MBC Entertainment Awards	Top Excellence Award - Show/Variety	Real Man	Won
2015	MBC Entertainment Awards	Best Couple Award with Jung Gyu-woon	Real Man	Nominated
2016	52nd Baeksang Arts Awards	Best Male Variety Performer	Real Man	Nominated
2017	Melon Music Awards	Best Trot with Hong Jin-young	"Ring Ring (Composer Version)"	Won
2017	SBS Entertainment Awards	Radio DJ Award	Kim Young-chul's Power FM	Won
2018	Korea Brand Awards	Radio DJ of the Year	Kim Young-chul's Power FM	Won
