= Let's Eat (TV series) =

- Promotional poster
- Genre: Romance; Comedy; Thriller
- Written by: Im Soo-mi; Jun Ji-hyun; Jo Yoon-kyung; Kim Hyo-shin; Lee Ye-rim
- Directed by: Park Joon-hwa; Im Se-bin; Im Young-jin; Kim Bo-yeon; Seo Min-jung; Kim Gye-young; Park Min-hyun; Choi Min-sun; Kim Se-hee
- Starring: Lee Soo-kyung; Yoon Doo-joon; Shim Hyung-tak; Yoon So-hee
- Country of origin: South Korea
- Original language: Korean
- No. of seasons: 1
- No. of episodes: 16

Production
- Production location: Seoul
- Production company: CJ E&M

Original release
- Network: tvN
- Release: November 28, 2013 – March 13, 2014

Let's Eat (Korean: 식샤를 합시다; RR: Siksyareul hapsida) is a 2013 South Korean television series starring Lee Soo-kyung, Yoon Doo-joon, Shim Hyung-tak and Yoon So-hee. It aired on tvN from November 28, 2013, to March 13, 2014, for 16 episodes. The series is about four single people who are brought together by their love of food.

== Synopsis ==
Four single people, happily divorced paralegal Lee Soo-kyung (Lee Soo-kyung), mysterious gourmand Goo Dae-young (Yoon Doo-joon), design student and former rich girl Yoon Jin-yi (Yoon So-hee), and petty lawyer Kim Hak-moon (Shim Hyung-tak), all enjoy living alone, except for that pesky problem that dining out is not designed for one. At Jin-yi's request, she, Soo-kyung and Dae-young start eating out together and thus get involved in each other's lives. Let's Eat depicts the daily life and romance of a single woman when a murder case occurs in her neighborhood. Lee Soo-Kyung is a 33-year-old single woman. She divorced when she was in her 20's and now lives alone. She always wants to carry herself with dignity, but she loses self-control when she is near gourmet foods. Koo Dae-Young is a gourmet who is especially talented with describing the taste of foods. He often lies when he opens his mouth, but he is usually considerate of others.

== Cast ==
=== Main ===
- Lee Soo-kyung as Lee Soo-kyung

A chief secretary at a lawyer's office who craves food and often attempts to always follow the law. She's arrogant, rude, sassy, and tends to be a know-it-all, but she has a kinder side. She begins to show feelings for Dae-young.

- Yoon Doo-joon as Goo Dae-young

The mysterious neighbor who seems to always catch the hearts of young ladies. He seems to be an expert on food, and likes to show it too.

- Shim Hyung-tak as Kim Hak-moon

Soo-kyung's boss who acts rude, arrogant, and mean, but actually has an obsessive crush on Soo-kyung.

- Yoon So-hee as Yoon Jin-yi

The new quirky young lady whose parents live in the States. She quickly makes friends with Dae-young.

=== Recurring ===
- Lee Do-yeon as Oh Do-yeon
- Jang Won-young as Choi Kyu-sik
- Jung Soo-young as Park Kyung-mi
- Hong Eun-taek as Choi Deok-young
- Feeldog as Hyun Kwang-suk
- Choi Dae-sung as laundromat boss
- Jung Tae-sung as Hak-moon's nephew

=== Special appearances ===
- Park Young-seo as man on Soo-kyung's blind date (ep. 1)
- Lee Yong-nyeo as Bae Mi-ja (ep. 1)
- Lee Sang-woo as Kim Sung-soo, divorce client (ep. 8)
- Nam Nung-mi as Soo-kyung's mother (ep. 8–9)
- Kang Ye-bin as woman on Hak-moon's blind date (ep. 9)
- Heo Gu-yeon as Dae-young's father (ep. 10)
- Choi Phillip as Catholic church oppa, Soo-kyung's third ex-boyfriend (ep. 11)
- Lee Yong-joo as basketball team captain, Soo-kyung's second ex-boyfriend (ep. 11)
- Lee Yoon-mi as pet shop owner (ep. 11)
- Nam Chang-hee as dog owner (ep. 12)
- Sam Hammington as president of soy sauce crab restaurant (ep. 12)
- Kim San-ho as Hak-moon's restaurant owner friend (ep. 13)
- Choi Sung-joon as assailant (ep. 14)
- Jung Eun-pyo as police officer (ep. 14)
- Jung Kyung-ho as housing agency employee (ep. 15)
- Lee Il-hwa as Kwang-suk's mother (ep. 16)
- Uhm Hyun-kyung as restaurant customer eating delicious food (ep. 16)
- Kim Hyun-sook as Lee Young-ae, café customer (ep. 16)
- Ra Mi-ran as Manager Ra, café customer (ep. 16)
- An unknown Siberian Husky that scared Mr. Kim (ep. 12)

== Production ==
The drama features eating scenes of the characters who live alone. Park Joon-hwa, producer-director of the drama, said "The drama focuses on building relationships between strangers through having a meal and ultimately relieving their solitude. It portrays the process of how people improve relations via food", and further explained that "Korean dramas have lots of eating scenes in which conflict erupts or settles down".

== Ratings ==
- In this table, the blue numbers represent the lowest ratings and the red numbers represent the highest ratings.
- N/A denotes that the rating is not known.

| Ep. | Original broadcast date | Title | Average audience share (AGB Nielsen) |
| Ep. | Original broadcast date | Title | Nationwide |
|---|---|---|---|
| 1 | November 28, 2013 | A Declaration of Living Alone | 1.349% |
| 2 | December 5, 2013 | Getting to Know Your Neighbors | 1.034% |
| 3 | December 12, 2013 | I Want to Be Alone. Everybody, Get Out! | 1.135% |
| 4 | December 19, 2013 | Answer Me, Neighbors | 1.168% |
| 5 | December 26, 2013 | Worry Over Money, Cry Over Money | 1.237% |
| 6 | January 2, 2014 | Pride and Prejudice | 1.401% |
| 7 | January 9, 2014 | Why Life Is Like Eating Dinner Alone | —N/a |
| 8 | January 16, 2014 | Things That You Can See Only When You Quit | 1.316% |
| 9 | January 23, 2014 | Mamma Mia | 1.364% |
| 10 | January 30, 2014 | Gourmet Over Flowers | 1.245% |
| 11 | February 6, 2014 | Everyone Who's Not in Love Now, Is Guilty | 1.221% |
| 12 | February 13, 2014 | The Taste of Love... Bitter Sweet | 1.121% |
| 13 | February 20, 2014 | The Man Who Only Looked at Me | 1.366% |
| 14 | February 27, 2014 | She Has Disappeared | 1.683% |
| 15 | March 6, 2014 | Your Silence | 1.175% |
| 16 | March 13, 2014 | Still... Let's Eat | 1.460% |
| Average | | | 1.285% |

- This drama airs on a cable channel/pay TV which normally has a relatively smaller audience compared to free-to-air TV/public broadcasters (KBS, SBS, MBC and EBS).

== Sequel ==
A second season titled Let's Eat 2 aired in 2015, but only Yoon Doo-joon reprised his role as Goo Dae-young, who moves to Sejong City and befriends new neighbors played by Seo Hyun-jin and Kwon Yul.

The third season Let's Eat 3 aired in 2018 with Goo Dae-young, in his 30s, revisiting foods he loved in his 20s with former college classmate Lee Ji-woo (Baek Jin-hee) and their memories of the past.
