= Where Are You Going, DdaengChul =

2018 South Korean variety show

- Also known as: Ding Ding Guest House Tour: Where Have You Been, The Chul's Tour
- Genre: Travel Show
- Starring: Kim Young-chul; Noh Hong-chul; Kim Hee-chul
- Country of origin: South Korea; Japan
- Original language: Korean
- No. of episodes: 7

Production
- Production location: South Korea
- Running time: 75

Original release
- Release: July 15 – August 26, 2018

Where Are You Going, DdaengChul? (Korean: 땡철이 어디가) is a variety show launched by TV Chosun.

== Host ==
The three hosts collectively called "Three 철 (Chul)", which was named after the name "철" in each person's name.

Name	Age when participating in the show	Occupation
Kim Young-chul	43-44	Comedian, Host
Noh Hong-chul	39	Artist, Presenter
Kim Hee-chul	34-35	Singer (member of Super Junior), Actor, Host

== Format ==
A new travel variety show starring Super Junior's Kim Hee-chul and comedians Kim Young-chul and Noh Hong-chul. The three "Chul" brothers will be staying at guest houses in Korea and seeing all the local attractions, food, and scenery the destinations have to offer.

== Contents of each episode ==
Episode	Broadcast date	Destination (date of shooting)	Sights	Guests	Rating
1	July 15, 2018	Japan Fukuoka (June 16–18, 2018)	Itoshima, Fukuoka: Coconut Tree Swing, Baisi Waterfall	/	1.011%
2	July 22, 2018	Japan Fukuoka (June 16–18, 2018)	Itoshima, Fukuoka: Silk Island; Kyushu Kokura: ALUALU City, Moji-ku, Kitakyūshū: retro sightseeing train, train cafe	/	0.718%
3	July 29, 2018	Review of the first and second episodes			
4	August 5, 2018	Japan Fukuoka (July 10–12, 2018)	Fukuoka Airport: Ramen runway Yame, Fukuoka: bed and breakfasts surrounding walks, tea ceremony experience	/	—
5	August 12, 2018	Japan Fukuoka (July 10–12, 2018)	Nine remaining rice market: Market; Yanagawa, Fukuoka：Royal flower, boating Yanagawa	/	—
6	August 19, 2018 (August 7, 2018)	Kim Young-Chul: South Korea Yangpyeong; Noh Hong-chul: South Korea Chuncheon; Kim Hee Chul: South Korea Paju	Yangping Market, Charcoal Sauna	/	—
6	August 19, 2018 (August 7, 2018)	Kim Young-Chul: South Korea Yangpyeong; Noh Hong-chul: South Korea Chuncheon; Kim Hee Chul: South Korea Paju	Yiyan Lake	/	—
6	August 19, 2018 (August 7, 2018)	Kim Young-Chul: South Korea Yangpyeong; Noh Hong-chul: South Korea Chuncheon; Kim Hee Chul: South Korea Paju	Heyri Art Village: Game Museum, Movie Museum, Modern History Museum, Handcraft Experience Hall	Kim Shin-young	—
7	August 26, 2018 (August 26, 2018)	Kim Young-Chul: South Korea Yangpyeong; Noh Hong-chul: South Korea Chuncheon; Kim Hee Chul: South Korea Paju	Heyri Art Village: Game Museum, Movie Museum, Modern History Museum, Handcraft Experience Hall	Kim Shin-young	—
7	August 26, 2018 (August 26, 2018)	South Korea Yangpyeong	Heal the forest	Park Mi-sun	—
