= Friendly Driver =

- Promotional poster
- Genre: Reality; Variety
- Starring: Lee Soo-geun; Kim Young-chul; Yoon So-hee; Microdot
- Country of origin: South Korea
- Original language: Korean
- No. of seasons: 1
- No. of episodes: 12

Production
- Producer: Lee Yoon-ho
- Production location: South Korea
- Running time: 75 minutes

Original release
- Network: tvN
- Release: January 24 – April 18, 2018

Friendly Driver (Korean: 친절한 기사단) is a South Korean television program. It airs on tvN on every Wednesday at 20:10 (KST) beginning 24 January 2018, starring Lee Soo-geun, Kim Young-chul, Yoon So-hee and Microdot.

== Program ==
The cast will be at Incheon International Airport looking for tourists and offer to drive them to their destinations for free, accompanying the tourists for their schedules of the day and more services like giving a free tour with a specific theme.

== Cast ==
- Lee Soo-geun
- Kim Young-chul
- Yoon So-hee
- Microdot

== Episodes ==
Episode #	Broadcast Date	Passenger(s)	Note(s)
1	January 24, 2018	A couple and their relatives from Thailand	—N/a
2	January 31, 2018	1. Group of 5 male students (who are also a musical group) from a medical university in Spain; 2. 2 female BTS fans from Australia	—N/a
3	February 7, 2018	1. 2 male friends of Microdot from New Zealand; 2. Female student from France who's currently studying at University of Tokyo	Guest driver: Ko Sung-hee; Kim Young-chul did not take part in the opening and went straight to the airport due to scheduled radio show earlier on
4	February 14, 2018	1. 2 male friends of Microdot from New Zealand; 2. Female student from France who's currently studying at University of Tokyo	Guest driver: Ko Sung-hee; Kim Young-chul did not take part in the opening and went straight to the airport due to scheduled radio show earlier on
5	February 21, 2018	1. 2 announcers (1 male, 1 female) from Canada; 2. 4 tourists (1 male from Australia, 2 females from India, 1 females from Kazakhstan)	Guest driver: Park Joon-hyung; Kim Young-chul is absent due to scheduling conflict; Special episode: Find customers who are on their way to watch the 2018 Winter Olympics
6	February 28, 2018	1. Family of 5 from Switzerland (one of them being a Korean born in Daegu); 2. 2 businessmen from Sweden; 3. A married couple from Hong Kong	Surprise appearance by Sioen; From this episode onward, all tourists who agreed to the services of Friendly Driver will all gather together and ride in 1 mini bus alongside the cast
7	March 7, 2018	1. A male lawyer from Hong Kong; 2. A female university student from Belarus taking Master's for Korean Studies in a university in Korea; 3. A female exchange student of Seoul National University from France	Guest driver: Stella Jang; Microdot is absent due to his attendance of his elder brother's wedding ceremony in New Zealand; Incheon Tour Special
8	March 14, 2018	1. 3 female university students (2 Japanese, 1 Korean) who had met while studying in Tennessee, United States; 2. A male technician from Belgium; 3. 2 female students from China majoring in Korean	Guest driver: Heo Kyung-hwan; Yoon So-hee is absent for personal reasons; K-BOB Tour Special
9	March 28, 2018	1. 1 male musician from United States who used to live in Korea for 2 years as an English teacher 2. 1 female nurse from Finland; 3. Mother and son from Canada; 4. 1 female Ohio State University student from United States; 5. A couple (male is a college graduate, female is currently a college student) from Germany; 6. 4 friends (1 male, 3 female) from Germany	Guest driver: Hwangbo; Time Slip - History Tour Special
10	April 4, 2018	1. 1 male musician from United States who used to live in Korea for 2 years as an English teacher 2. 1 female nurse from Finland; 3. Mother and son from Canada; 4. 1 female Ohio State University student from United States; 5. A couple (male is a college graduate, female is currently a college student) from Germany; 6. 4 friends (1 male, 3 female) from Germany	Guest driver: Hwangbo; Time Slip - History Tour Special
10	April 4, 2018	1. A male from Mexico who works as an automotive programmer 2. A couple from Germany, both are field hockey coaches 3. A male from the Netherlands; 4. 3 businessmen (2 from Italy, 1 from United States who is also a helicopter pilot) from a helicopter manufacturer who are in Korea to transact a helicopter to a customer	Guest driver: Hyelim; The cast are at Gwanghwamun Tourist Information Center to find tourists; Indoor Activities Tour Special
11	April 11, 2018	1. 4 male friends (2 twin males from Austria, one who is currently working as a trader specialising in agro commodities, the other currently a doctorate student studying in the German Cancer Research Center; 1 male from Austria who is a friend of the trader twin as they studied Master's Degree, and 1 male who was born in Germany and currently residing in Austria, studying for Master's degree in civil engineering); 2. A couple from Italy who have been residing in South Korea for 8 years (the husband worked in private banking, before switching to wine business, and eventually to opening an Italian restaurant in South Korea); 3. A male from United States who is currently an actor	Guest driver: Eddy Kim; The cast are at Seocho Tourist Information Center to find tourists; Outdoor Activities Glamping Special at Yangpyeong County
12	April 18, 2018	1. A female from the Netherlands who is currently living in London, working as an air stewardess; studied Chinese in her university times at London; 2. 2 females from United States (One is originally from Michigan, but currently lives in Germany working as the principal of an elementary school; the other originally from Mississippi, but currently resides in Seoul); 3. 2 male friends from Barcelona, Spain (one is working as an eye doctor, the other currently working in Burberry); 4. 2 males from Switzerland (they are of cousin relationship; one is a trumpet player who currently resides in Germany, the other works in the digital marketing business and has stayed in Spain, Thailand and Dubai)	Guest driver: Kim Chung-ha; The cast are at Hongik University Tourist Information Center to find tourists; Moonlight Tour Special

== Ratings ==
In the ratings below, the highest rating for the show will be in red, and the lowest rating for the show will be in blue each year.

Ep. #	Broadcast date	Average audience share		
Ep. #	Broadcast date	AGB Nielsen		TNmS Ratings
Ep. #	Broadcast date	Nationwide	Seoul Capital Area	Nationwide
1	January 24, 2018	1.436%	NR	1.8%
2	January 31, 2018	1.015%	NR	1.3%
3	February 7, 2018	0.959%	NR	1.3%
4	February 14, 2018	0.980%	NR	1.3%
5	February 21, 2018	0.603%	NR	0.6%
6	February 28, 2018	1.446%	1.531%	1.5%
7	March 7, 2018	1.254%	NR	1.5%
8	March 14, 2018	0.880%	NR	0.9%
9	March 28, 2018	1.153%	NR	1.1%
10	April 4, 2018	1.190%	1.580%	1.1%
11	April 11, 2018	1.258%	1.778%	1.1%
12	April 18, 2018	1.157%	1.534%	1.1%

- Note that the show airs on a cable channel (pay TV), which plays part in its slower uptake and relatively small audience share when compared to programs broadcast (FTA) on public networks such as KBS, SBS, MBC or EBS.
- NR rating means "not reported".
