= One More Time (South Korean TV series) =

- Also known as: I Want to Protect You ~One More Time~
- Genre: Teen; Romance; Music; Fantasy
- Starring: Kim Myung-soo; Yoon So-hee
- No. of episodes: 8

Production
- Production companies: KBS2; KBS World (Japanese TV channel); Netflix

Original release
- Release: October 26 – December 14, 2016

One More Time (Korean: 헤어진 다음날; RR: Heeojin Daeumnal; lit. 'The Day After We Broke Up') is a 2016 South Korean web series starring Kim Myung-soo and Yoon So-hee. It was released exclusively on Netflix on March 10, 2017.

== Plot ==
Yoo Tan is the leader and vocalist of an indie band called One More Time, which he started with his childhood friends. As the band’s popularity and revenue begins to dwindle, Tan decides to sign a contract with a music label. While adjusting to his new life, Tan gets swept up in a mysterious event – An unwanted time leap allows him to journey back in time to regain his girlfriend.

== Cast ==
=== Main ===
Actor	Character	Notes
Kim Myung-soo	Yoo Tan	Singer of indie band "One More Time". Caught in loop repeating same day (October 4th) over and over.
Yoon So-hee	Moon Da-in	Tan's girl friend and band's pianist

=== Supporting ===
Actor	Character	Description
Kim Ji-young	Grim Reaper	Appears at key events in Tan's daily repetitions
Shin Ji-soo	Bo-yu	Star in girl band "Showtime". Tan's new singing partner.
Kim Ki-doo	Jin-gook	Bass player for indie band "One More Time"
Kang Nam-gil	Yoo Tan's Dad	Run's food cart passed by Tan every morning
Lee Tae-im	Kang Ye-seul	KE intertainment director trying to recruit Tan for his looks not his talents
Kim Chang-hwan	No-young	Drummer for indie band "One More Time"
Ko Kyu-pil	loan shark	Visits Tan every money trying to get the payment for the tan's loan

== Episodes ==
No.
1
Musician Yoo Tan jumps off stage and declares his unending love for his girlfriend, Da-in. Seven years later, he seems to have a change of heart.
2
From the spam phone call to the meeting with an entertainment company representative, everything seems to be a repeat of yesterday for Tan.
3
After countless days of spending money, partying and gambling, Tan finally starts to wonder how his other band members and Da-in are doing.
4
Determined to change how the day ends, Tan tries to eliminate everything that can go wrong and decides to take Da-in away on an unplanned trip.
5
Seven years ago on the day that Tan and Da-in met for the first time, Tan was busking with his band and Da-in became his first audience member.
6
Da-in makes a deal with the death messenger. On their first anniversary, Tan takes Da-in to an expensive restaurant and prepares a special event.
7
Tan decides to that taking his life first is the only solution to end his agony. The death messenger explains to him how he can stop the time slips.
8
Again and again, Da-in gets heartbroken and prepares for a breakup. Regardless, Tan continues to compose and practice Da-in's new song.

== See also ==
- List of original programs distributed by Netflix
- List of South Korean dramas
