= L (entertainer) =

South Korean singer and actor (born 1992)

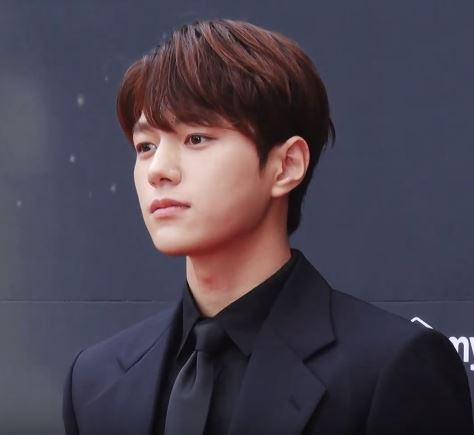
- L in 2019
- Born: Kim Myung-soo; March 13, 1992 (age 34); Seoul, South Korea
- Education: Daekyung University
- Occupations: Singer; actor
- Agent: Look Media
- Musical career
- Genres: K-pop; R&B
- Instrument: Vocals
- Years active: 2010–present
- Member of: Infinite; Infinite F

Korean name
- Hangul: 김명수
- Hanja: 金明洙
- RR: Gim Myeongsu
- MR: Kim Myŏngsu

Kim Myung-soo (Korean: 김명수; born March 13, 1992), known professionally as L (Korean: 엘), is a South Korean singer and actor. He debuted as a vocalist of boy band Infinite in 2010 and its sub-group Infinite F in 2014.

== Early life ==
Kim Myungsoo was born on March 13, 1992, in Seongdong-gu, Seoul, South Korea. He has a brother, Kim Moon-soo, who is two years younger than him. Kim attended Duk-soo High School and graduated from Daekyung University on February 15, 2013, majoring in practical music.

== Career ==
=== 2010–2016: Music and acting career ===
As a high school student, L auditioned for Woollim Entertainment after being street cast for his good looks. He was selected as the first member of idol group Infinite. He made his debut as a vocalist of the boy group in June 2010. In 2011, he made his acting debut in Japanese drama Jiu Keishicho Tokushuhan Sousagakari, which aired on TV Asahi in July. In 2012, he was cast in tvN's romance comedy series Flower Band, as a guitarist of a rock group. He was also cast in MBC's sitcom What's The Deal, Mom?

On May 15, 2013, L released a photo essay book titled L's Bravo Viewtiful, showing photos taken by him on a 93-day journey. The book was a best-seller, and reached No. 1 in pre-orders on online bookstores such as Yes24 and Kyobo. In August 2013, he had a cameo in SBS's Master's Sun, playing the younger version of So Ji-sub's character.

In 2014, he was cast in supporting roles in MBC's Cunning Single Lady and SBS's My Lovely Girl.

With bandmates Sungyeol and Sungjong he comprised the subgroup Infinite F, which released a single album, Koi No Sign, in Japan on November 19, 2014, and a Korean album, Love Sign, in December 2014.

In 2015, he was cast in his first film Mister Shark, about a boy who befriends a shark.

In 2016, L was cast in the Korean-Chinese web drama My Catman. He also starred in the drama special The Day After We Broke Up, which was his first lead role.

=== 2017–2023: Rising popularity and military enlistment ===
In 2017, L starred in MBC's historical drama The Emperor: Owner of the Mask. His portrayal of a commoner who stands in for the king earned viewers' approval, and he was named Actor of the Month in June by MBC Dramanet.

In 2018, L starred in the legal drama Ms. Hammurabi portraying a judge. His performance in the series was well-received, earning him increased recognition.

In 2019, L starred in the fantasy romance drama Angel's Last Mission: Love. In August 2019, L left Woollim.

In 2020, L starred in the fantasy romance drama Welcome as a cat who turns into a human male. In December 2020, L starred in historical comedy Royal Secret Agent.

Before his enlistment, he released his debut single album Memory on February 3. He also held an online fan meeting on February 20. On September 25, 2021, it was announced that L would make his musical theatre debut while serving his military enlistment in the military musical Meisa's Song alongside EXO's Chanyeol, B.A.P.'s Daehyun and actor Moon Yong-suk.

On March 7, 2023, L signed a contract with Look Media.

=== 2024–present: Projects and activities in the Philippines ===
On November 12, 2024, L has signed a contract with Universal Records Philippines and GLXY Talent Management. A day after, he also made an appearance on a Filipino television variety show.

== Personal life ==
=== Military enlistment ===
On February 22, 2021, L enlisted for his mandatory military service as a member of the Republic of Korea Marine Corps. L was discharged on August 21, 2022. Later, on August 22, 2022, L posted on Instagram that he was discharged from military service.

== Ambassadorship ==
- Tourism Ambassador for Tourism Promotions Board of the Philippines (2025)

== Discography ==
=== Extended plays ===
Title	Details	Peak chart positions	Sales
Title	Details	KOR	Sales
24/7	Released: August 5, 2024; Label: Lookmedia; Formats: CD, digital download, streaming	7	KOR: 50,042

=== Single albums ===
Title	Details	Peak chart positions	Sales
Title	Details	KOR	Sales
Memory	Released: February 3, 2021; Label: Management 2sang, Universal Music; Formats: CD, digital download, streaming	5	KOR: 18,844

=== Singles ===
Title	Year	Peak chart position	Sales	Album
Title	Year	KOR	Sales	Album
As lead artist
"It's All For You"	2013	—	—N/a	Non-album single
"Reminisce"	2018	—	—N/a	Top Seed
"Memory" (기억과 기억 사이)	2021	— (Note: "Memory" did not enter Gaon Digital Chart, but debuted and peaked at number 62 on Gaon Download Chart.)	—N/a	Memory
"What’s Not To Love"	2024	—	—N/a	24/7
Soundtrack appearances
"Love U Like U" (with Kim Yerim)	2012	27	KOR: 233,449	Flower Band OST
"It's Okay Even If It's Not Me" (내가 아니어도 좋아)	2017	—	—N/a	The Emperor: Owner of the Mask OST
"The Nights That I Miss You" (널 그리는 밤)	2019	—	—N/a	Angel's Last Mission: Love OST
Compilation
"Go Get Her" (그녀를 잡아요) (with Park Jae-jung)	2016	—	—N/a	King of Mask Singer Ep. 63
"In the Rain" (빗속에서)	2016	—	—N/a	King of Mask Singer Ep. 63
"—" denotes releases that did not chart or were not released in that region.

=== Songwriting and producing credits ===
Year	Album	Artist	Song	Lyrics		Music	
Year	Album	Artist	Song	Credited	With	Credited	With
2013	Non-album single	L	"It's All For You"	Yes	—N/a	Yes	—
2018	Top Seed	L	"Reminisce"	Yes	Jeong Min-ji	No	—

== Filmography ==
Key
†	Denotes films that have not yet been released

=== Television series ===
Year	Title	Role	Notes	Ref.
2011	Jiu	Jiu	Japanese drama	
2011	Welcome to the Wara Store	Himself	Voice only	
2012	Flower Band	Lee Hyun-soo		
2012	Salamander Guru and The Shadows	Himself	Cameo, (Episode 3)	
2012	What is Mom?	Kim Myung-soo		
2013	Master's Sun	Joo Joong-won (young)		
2014	Cunning Single Lady	Gil Yo-han		
2014	My Lovely Girl	Shi-woo		
2015	The Time We Were Not in Love	Ki Sung-jae	Cameo (Episode 2–4)	
2016	One More Time	Yoo Tan	Drama special	
2017	The Emperor: Owner of the Mask	Lee Sun		
2018	Ms. Hammurabi	Im Ba-reun		
2019	Angel's Last Mission: Love	Kim Dan		
2020	Welcome	Hong-jo		
2020–2021	Royal Secret Agent	Sung Yi-gyum		
2023	Numbers	Jang Ho-woo		
2024	Perfect Family	Lee Seong-woo	Cameo	
2024	Dare to Love Me	Shin Yoon-bok		
2026	Love in Sync	Cha Eun-hwan		
2026	Plum Blossom, Moon †			

=== Web series ===
Year	Title	Role	Notes	Ref.
2016	My Catman	Jung Ho-yeon	Korean-Chinese web drama	

=== Hosting ===
Year	Title	Notes	Ref.
2014	SBS Gayo Daejeon	with Nichkhun, Jung Yong-hwa, Baro, Mino, and Song Ji-hyo	
2022	2022 Changwon K-POP World Festival	with AleXa and Sua (Billlie)	

== Theater ==
Year	English title	Korean title	Role	Notes	Ref.
2021	The Meisa's Song	메이사의 노래	Yeon Jun-seok	Military musical	

== Publication ==
=== Photobook ===
Year	Title	Publisher	Ref.
2013	L's Bravo Viewtiful	Tokyo	
2013	L's Bravo Viewtiful Part. 2	Tokyo	

== Awards and nominations ==
Name of the award ceremony, year presented, category, nominee of the award, and the result of the nomination
Award ceremony	Year	Category	Nominee / Work	Result	Ref.
APAN Star Awards	2018	Best New Actor	Ms. Hammurabi	Nominated	
Asia Artist Awards	2018	Best Icon	L	Won	
Asia Model Award	2019	Popular Star (Actor)	Angel's Last Mission: Love	Won	
KBS Drama Awards	2019	Excellence Award, Actor in a Miniseries	Angel's Last Mission: Love	Nominated	
KBS Drama Awards	2019	Best New Actor	Angel's Last Mission: Love	Won	
KBS Drama Awards	2019	Netizen Award, actor	Angel's Last Mission: Love	Nominated	
KBS Drama Awards	2019	K-Drama Hallyu Star	Angel's Last Mission: Love	Won	
KBS Drama Awards	2019	Best Couple Award	Kim Myung-soo with Shin Hye-sun; Angel's Last Mission: Love	Won	
KBS Drama Awards	2020	Excellence Award, Actor in a Miniseries	Welcome	Nominated	
KBS Drama Awards	2021	Top Excellence Award, Actor	Royal Secret Agent	Nominated	
KBS Drama Awards	2021	Excellence Award, Actor in a Miniseries	Royal Secret Agent	Nominated	
Korea Drama Awards	2013	Best Young Actor	Master's Sun	Nominated	
Korea Drama Awards	2017	Best New Actor	The Emperor: Owner of the Mask	Nominated	
Korea Drama Awards	2019	Best New Actor	Angel's Last Mission: Love	Nominated	
Korea Drama Awards	2022	Global Star Award	Royal Secret Agent	Won	
Korea First Brand Awards	2017	Male Acting Idol	L	Nominated	
MBC Drama Awards	2017	Excellence Award, Actor in a Miniseries	The Emperor: Owner of the Mask	Nominated	
MBC Drama Awards	2017	Best New Actor	The Emperor: Owner of the Mask	Nominated	
MBC Drama Awards	2017	Popularity Award, actor	The Emperor: Owner of the Mask	Won	
MBC Drama Awards	2017	Best Character Award, Fighting Spirit Acting	The Emperor: Owner of the Mask	Won	
MBC Drama Awards	2023	Top Excellence Award, Actor in a Miniseries	Numbers	Nominated	
Seoul International Drama Awards	2021	Outstanding Korean Actor	Royal Secret Agent	Nominated	
Seoul Webfest Awards	2017	Best Rising Star	My Catman	Nominated	
Seoul Webfest Awards	2017	Special Award	My Catman	Won	
Soompi Awards	2018	Best Idol Actor	The Emperor: Owner of the Mask	Nominated	
The Seoul Awards	2017	Popularity Award, actor	The Emperor: Owner of the Mask	Nominated	
