= Lee Han =

South Korean film director and screenwriter

- Born: 1970 (age 55–56); South Korea
- Education: Hanyang University
- Occupations: Film director, screenwriter
- Years active: 1996–present

Korean name
- Hangul: 이한
- Hanja: 李翰
- RR: I Han
- MR: I Han

Lee Han (born 1970) is a South Korean film director and screenwriter. He is best known for the coming-of-age film Punch, which became one of the biggest hits on the South Korean box office in 2011.

== Career ==
Lee Han graduated from Hanyang University's theater and film program. He first worked as an assistant director on two films for veteran filmmaker Bae Chang-ho: Love Story (1996) and My Heart (1999). In 2002, he wrote and directed his first feature, Lovers' Concerto, a melodrama about three friends caught in a love triangle which starred Cha Tae-hyun, Lee Eun-ju and Son Ye-jin. He then wrote the screenplay for Garden of Heaven (2003), a tearjerker about a hospice doctor who falls for a terminally ill patient, played by Ahn Jae-wook and Lee Eun-joo. Lee was also part of the writing staff of Bodyguard, a 2003 action-comedy television series starring Cha Seung-won.

With his succeeding films, Lee further solidified his reputation as a filmmaker with a keen insight into modern romance. Almost Love (also known as Youth Comic) is a 2006 romantic comedy starring Kwon Sang-woo and Kim Ha-neul about a stuntman and an actress with stage fright. My Love (also known as Love, First) is a 2007 Christmas movie which featured an ensemble cast playing multiple couples, namely Kam Woo-sung, Choi Kang-hee, Ryu Seung-ryong, Im Jung-eun, Jung Il-woo, Lee Yeon-hee and Uhm Tae-woong.

But Lee's breakthrough film would be his fourth feature, Punch (2011). Based on Kim Ryeo-ryeong's 2008 bestseller Wandeuk, the film seriously highlighted the issue of multicultural families in a coming-of-age comedy-drama about a poor and rebellious teenage boy (the titular Wandeuk, played by Yoo Ah-in), whose idiosyncratic homeroom teacher and next-door neighbor (Kim Yoon-seok) encourages him to learn more about his Filipino immigrant mother, and their teacher-student relationship helps him mature into a young man. After gaining strong word of mouth for its interesting story and charismatic performances, Punch became a surprise box office hit, drawing 5.3 million viewers. It was also invited to the 2012 Berlin International Film Festival; it screened in Generation 14Plus, a competition section of Berlinale devoted to films for teens. Commenting on the film's positive reception, Lee told Yonhap News that the seemingly eclectic ensemble of characters who appear in Punch, though they rarely receive the limelight, are present and active as members of Korean society. He also believed that the warmth and honesty with which he tried to portray these characters and introduce their daily lives was what resonated with viewers.

In 2014, Lee adapted another bestselling novel by Kim Ryeo-ryeong, Elegant Lies (published in 2009). When quizzed about adapting another work by the same author, Lee said that he chose to do so because "the story was interesting as well as meaningful. In fact I turned down the original story at first because it seemed too difficult. However, it captivated and wouldn't let go. I finally made up my mind to deliver this story to show people who thought it couldn't be done. This film was made for the readers who think this family's story is as special as I do." Thread of Lies explores the aftermath of a 14-year-old girl's suicide, as her mother and older sister belatedly learn after her death that she had been an outcast in middle school and a victim of bullying. Kim Hee-ae played the mother, in her first film in 21 years after focusing on television work, opposite a teenage cast composed of Go Ah-sung, Kim You-jung and Kim Hyang-gi.

== Filmography ==
=== Film ===
Year	Title		Credited as			Ref.
Year	English	Korean	Director	Writer	Producer	Ref.
2002	Lovers' Concerto	연애소설	Yes	Yes	No	
2003	Garden of Heaven	하늘정원	No	Yes	No	
2006	Almost Love	청춘만화	Yes	Yes	No	
2007	My Love	내 사랑	Yes	Adaptation	No	
2011	Punch	완득이	Yes	Adaptation	No	
2014	Thread of Lies	우아한 거짓말	Yes	Adaptation	No	
2015	Love Forecast	오늘의 연애	No	Adaptation	No	
2015	The Piper	손님	No	No	Yes	
2016	A Melody to Remember	오빠생각	Yes	Adaptation	No	
2019	Innocent Witness	증인	Yes	Adaptation	No	
2023	Honey Sweet	달짝지근해: 7510	Yes	Adaptation	No	

=== Television ===
- Bodyguard (TV, 2003) - screenplay

== Awards ==
=== Awards and nominations ===
Awards and nominations
Year	Award	Category	Recipient	Result	Ref.
2011	Korean Institute of Film Application	Healing Movie of the Year	Punch	Won	
2012	62nd Berlin International Film Festival	Crystal Bear for Best Film	Punch	Nominated	
2012	48th Baeksang Arts Awards	Best Film	Punch	Nominated	
2012	48th Baeksang Arts Awards	Best Director	Punch	Nominated	
2012	14th Far East Film Festival	Black Dragon Award	Punch	3rd place	
2012	21st Buil Film Awards	Best Director	Punch	Won	
2012	59th Film Festival Zlín	Ecumenical Jury Award	Punch	Won	
2012	16th Tallinn Black Nights Film Festival	Just Film Grand Prix for Best Film	Punch	Nominated	
2015	45th Giffoni Film Festival	Cinecircoli Giovanili Socioculturali Award	Thread of Lies	Won	
2019	55th Baeksang Arts Awards	Best Screenplay (Note: Shared with Co-writer Moon Ji-won)	Innocent Witness	Nominated	
2019	56th Grand Bell Awards	Best Screenplay	Innocent Witness	Nominated	
2023	44th Blue Dragon Film Awards	Best Director	Honey Sweet	Nominated	
