= Moon Ji-won =

South Korean filmmaker (born 1982)

- 문지원
- Born: January 1, 1982 (age 44); South Korea
- Other name: One
- Education: Department of Visual Design at Haja Center
- Occupations: Film director; Screenwriter
- Years active: 2002 — present
- Organization(s): Korea Television and Radio Writers Association (KTRWA)

Korean name
- Hangul: 문지원
- RR: Mun Jiwon
- MR: Mun Chiwŏn

Moon Ji-won (Korean: 문지원, born January 1, 1982) is a South Korean film director and scriptwriter. Moon made her debut as a director in 2002 by directing the short film Keeping The Sea. She is also a columnist who publishes drama critiques from the perspective of a viewer in a sports magazine. Her notable work as scriptwriter includes the film Innocent Witness and the legal drama series Extraordinary Attorney Woo, which tells about a young autistic woman lawyer.

== Early years and education ==
Moon Ji-won was born in Incheon in 1982. She dreamed of becoming a film director during her middle school years. Despite her reluctance, she enrolled in high school due to her mother's persuasion. She dedicated herself to her studies, formed a band, and actively participated in various activities. Although she faced academic setbacks, she gradually improved her grades. However, the school's early mornings and late dismissals, lack of independent thinking, and rigid structure made her lose interest. Unable to continue attending a school she had no passion for, she withdrew in her second year of high school. She said,

I wanted to become a film director when I was in the 9th grade. I decided that finding my desired path was better than going to college. That's why I quit high school.

Four months leaving her previous school, Moon attended Haja Center, (Note: Haja Center, officially known as Seoul Youth Future Career Center (서울시립 청소년미래진로센터), is an alternative school that was established in December 1999 by Yonsei University. It operates as a youth center entrusted by the Seoul Metropolitan Government and was aimed at creating a model to address youth unemployment during the IMF economic crisis. Students specialize in one or more areas, including video, design, music, and performance.) an alternative workshop-based school. Attending the center, provided her with the opportunity to connect with like-minded individuals and develop a more adaptable personality. Moon studied visual arts at the center, directing short films and video projects. Her 21-minute short film, "Keeping the Sea," was screened at prestigious domestic film festivals such as the Jeonju International Film Festival.

In 2002, after convincing her Mother, Moon managed to become completely financially independent, working at an English academy to support herself. Pursuing her passion for filmmaking, she dedicated four days a week to shooting her 30-minute short film titled "Helmet." Her remarkable work on "Helmet" led to her receiving the prestigious Best New Director Award, the IF Award, at the 2005 Seoul International Women's Film Festival. Her graduation video from the Department of Visual Arts at Haja Vocational School in December 2003 provides a glimpse into her transformative experience at the school.

== Career ==
=== Early career ===
In 2003, Moon worked as an instructor on a cable TV program dedicated to providing advice for teenagers. In addition, she also worked as a columnist. From 2003 to 2006, she was in charge of "Reading Dramas with the 21-Year-Old One", (Note: Reading Drama with One, a 21-year-old (21살 원이의 드라마 읽기). The translation assumes that "원이" refers to One, Moon's pen name, who is 21 years old, rather than a literal translation of the word "circle".) a series of drama critiques written from the perspective of a South Korean woman in her twenties. This column was serialized in national daily newspaper, Ilgan Sports. The series, which she wrote for over three years, was scheduled to be published as a book in early 2007.

"I thought there should be a framework dedicated to dramas. It was a good opportunity to think about how to express films while watching dramas."

On August 25, 2006, her third independent film, "Stars Beyond the Window" was broadcast on KBS's "Independent Cinema". The story follows the road trip of Won and Sae-na, two protagonists in their 20s, as they embark on a journey driven by a desire to "live long" and explore the histories of women who rebelled against patriarchal society. The film captures the genuine concerns of young adults and adopts the format of a road movie.

"Movies are a microphone through which I can clearly convey the stories I want to tell. 'Helmet,' 'Holding onto the Sea,' 'Stars Beyond the Window,' and others are films I made on the themes of concerns faced by people of my age."

Since August 2006, Moon became member of the MBC Viewer Committee. She was selected as a viewer representative for youth organizations and will serve as an MBC viewer representative for one year. MBC selects 12 viewer representatives recommended by various organizations such as youth, women, and disabled groups. The monthly viewer committee discusses and organizes the monitored content with the production team in specific broadcasting. Among the MBC viewer representatives, Moon is the youngest. After becoming a viewer representative, Moon spends 4 to 5 hours watching broadcasts every day, and her main interest lies in human rights issues covered in programs.

I will effectively convey the voices of youth while serving as a viewer representative. As a youth organization representative, I can provide ideas about youth programs to the production team, and if there are any misconceptions, I can actively address them, which makes me happy. When emphasizing public service, distorted perspectives towards minorities can arise, and it can become another form of violence. As a viewer representative, I want to work on correcting such issues.

In 2013, she was selected as a creative education student in the Creative Talent Partnership Project, (Note: The Creative Talent Partnership Project (콘텐츠 창의인재동반사업 프로그램) is the representative content talent training program of the Korea Creative Content Agency. They support 1:1 mentoring between mentors and prospective creators, and strive to develop the creative abilities of prospective content creators and strengthen the competitiveness of the content industry.) organized by the Korea Creative Content Agency. As part of the program, she received a monthly stipend of one million won and dedicated her time to writing scenarios. Reflecting on this period, she revealed in an interview that despite facing financial constraints, being chosen for the project provided her with the means to sustain herself while allowing her creative abilities to flourish. Furthermore, she emphasized the valuable lessons she learned during this time, which continue to shape her work.

=== Debut as feature film scriptwriter ===
In 2016, Moon's talent gained recognition when she won the esteemed Grand Prize at the 5th Lotte Scenario Contest, (Note: Lotte Entertainment established "the Lotte Scenario Contest" (롯데 시나리오 공모대전) in 2012. In 2016, the contest underwent a name change and became known as "The Lotte Creative Contest" (롯데크리에이티브 공모전).) during the 21st Busan International Film Festival (BIFF). The contest received 964 entries, which underwent a rigorous blind judging process by prominent figures in the Korean film industry, unaware of the works' titles or authors' names. Moon's winning screenplay, which later transformed into the film Innocent Witness, earned her a prize of 100 million won.

Under the direction of Lee Han, known for his work on the coming-of-age film Punch and The Truth Beneath, the screenplay came to life in 2018. The film revolves around Soon-ho (Jung Woo-sung), a lawyer burdened by his father's debt, who takes on the murder case of Mi-ran (Yeom Hye-ran), a housekeeper accused of killing her employer. Ji-woo (Kim Hyang-gi), an autistic high school student, becomes the sole witness in the case. In an attempt to persuade Ji-woo to testify and disprove her testimony, Soon-ho befriends her.

Innocent Witness premiered in South Korea on February 13, 2019. The film achieved a significant milestone by surpassing the break-even point of 2 million admissions. According to the Korean Films Commission, by March 3, it had garnered a total of 2,288,410 admissions. The film received critical acclaim, resulting in Moon and Lee Han being nominated for Best Screenplay at 55th Baeksang Arts Awards and 56th Grand Bell Awards.

=== Career as television series scriptwriter ===
After the success of Innocent Witness, the production company A Story approached Moon to create the television drama Extraordinary Attorney Woo, with similar theme, and the project started in 2019. Moon developed the character Woo Young-woo, drawing inspiration from both the autistic character Ji-woo in Innocent Witness and the real-life rookie lawyer Shin Ju-young. Moon adapted Shin Ju-young's book "Master of the Court" for the drama, which vividly depicts courtroom stories based on Shin Ju-young's firsthand experiences as a rookie lawyer. The drama effectively captures the relentless pursuit of truth and the genuine concerns of clients while incorporating the passionate energy embodied by Shin Ju-young. Moon Ji-won, said,

I unfolded the book "Master of the Court" to find the material for the legal drama Extraordinary Attorney Woo. What was in the book was not a simple case material, but the passionate dedication of lawyers who do not hesitate to sacrifice themselves for their clients. The book is a source of inspiration for the passion of lawyers.

Extraordinary Attorney Woo was aired every Wednesday and Thursday at 21:00 (KST) on ENA from June 29 to August 18, 2022, for sixteen episodes. Additionally, it became a Netflix Simulcast Original Series available for streaming on Netflix in selected regions within one hour of its airing. The drama quickly gained immense popularity and generated significant buzz, leading to what is now known as the "Woo Young-woo Syndrome". It achieved remarkable success, with nationwide viewer ratings reaching 17.5% and metropolitan area ratings surpassing 19%. Notably, this marked the triumphant debut of writer Moon Ji-won in the drama genre.

=== Upcoming projects ===
Moon will make her directorial debut with the film 'Deaf Voice'. 'Deaf Voice' is based on Masaki Murayama's novel Deaf Voice Courtroom Sign Language Interpreter, which tells the story of the protagonist catching the real culprit of a terrible murder that occurred 20 years ago. produced by Barunson Studio, is scheduled to begin production in 2024 after the casting process is completed.

== Filmography ==
=== Film ===
Films of Moon
Year	Title		Credited as		Note(s)	Ref.
Year	English	Korean	Director	Screenplay	Note(s)	Ref.
2002	Keeping the Sea	바다를 간직하며	Yes	Yes	School short films	
2003	The Helmet	헬멧	Yes	Yes	School short films	
2006	Star over the Window	창문 너머 별	Yes	Yes	Short films	
2009	Written on the Body		Yes	Yes	Short films	
2013	Bad Child	나쁜 아이	Yes	Yes	Short films	
2017	Nose Nose Nose EYES!	코코코 눈!	Yes	Yes	Short films	
2019	Innocent Witness	증인	No	Co-writing (Note: Co-writing with scriptwriter/director Lee Han)	Feature films	
TBA	Deaf Voice	데프 보이스	Yes	Yes	Feature films	

=== Television drama ===
Television drama of Moon
Year	Title		Credited as		Ref.
Year	English	Korean	Director	Screenplay	Ref.
2022	Extraordinary Attorney Woo	이상한 변호사 우영우	No	Yes	

== Accolades ==
=== Awards and nominations ===
Name of the award ceremony, year presented, category, nominee(s) of the award, and the result of the nominationAwards and nominations
Award Ceremony	Year	Category	Nominee / Work	Result	Ref.
7th Seoul International Women's Film Festival	2005	If Award	The Helmet	Won	
9th Seoul International New Media Festival	2009	Best Love Award	Written on the Body	Won	
6th Seoul International Experimental Film Festival	2009	Avid Award	Written on the Body	Won	
Busan International Film Festival – 5th Lotte Scenario Contest	2016	Grand Prize	Innocent Witness	Won	
55th Baeksang Arts Awards	2019	Best Screenplay – Film (Note: Shared with Co-writer Lee Han)	Innocent Witness	Nominated	
56th Grand Bell Awards	2019	Best Screenplay	Innocent Witness	Nominated	
APAN Star Awards	2022	Best Screenplay — Television	Extraordinary Attorney Woo	Won	
Baeksang Arts Awards	2023	Best Screenplay — Television	Extraordinary Attorney Woo	Nominated	
Busan International Film Festival – Asia Contents Awards & Global OTT Awards	2022	Best Scriptwriter	Extraordinary Attorney Woo	Nominated	
Cultura Awards	2023	Cultura Award Television	Extraordinary Attorney Woo	Won	
KCA Korea Consumer Evaluation, Culture and Entertainment Award	2022	Best Screenplay	Extraordinary Attorney Woo	Won	
Kinolights Awards	2022	Korean Drama of the Year	Extraordinary Attorney Woo	Won	
Kim Soo-hyun Drama Art Hall (Cheongju Cultural Industry Promotion Foundation)	2022	Serial Drama Category – Good Drama of the Year	Extraordinary Attorney Woo	Won	

=== Listicles ===
Name of publisher, year listed, name of listicle, and placement
Publisher	Year	Listicle	Placement	Ref.
Cine21	2022	[Planning] 2022 Series Writer of the Year, Extraordinary Attorney Woo, Director Moon Ji-won	Won	
Cine21	2023	22 Writers	Shortlisted	
