= Baek Seo-yi =

South Korean actress (born 1992)

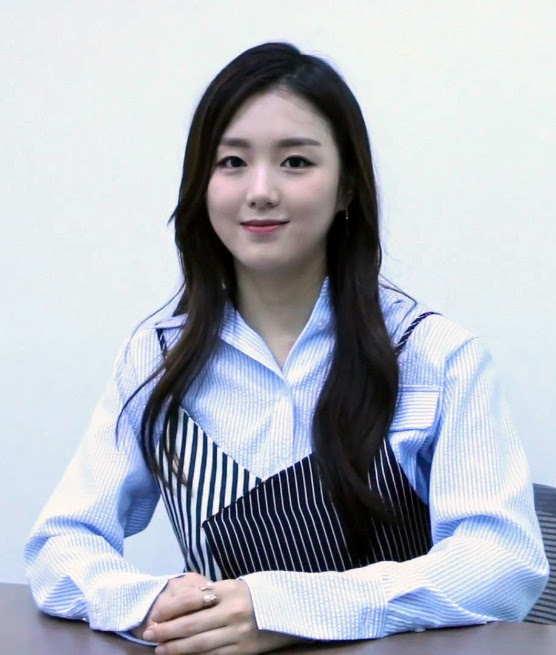
- Baek in August 2016
- Born: August 3, 1992 (age 34); Seoul, South Korea
- Education: Konkuk University (Department of Film)
- Occupation: Actress
- Years active: 2016–present
- Agent: Cube Entertainment

Korean name
- Hangul: 백서이
- RR: Baek Seoi
- MR: Paek Sŏi

Baek Seo-yi (Korean: 백서이; born August 3, 1992) is a South Korean actress.

== Career ==
Baek signed with new agency Cube Entertainment.

== Filmography ==
=== Film ===
Year	Title	Role	Notes	Ref.
2016	Familyhood	Kang Ji-Hoon's friend at club	Cameo	
2018	Keys to the Heart	Restaurant employee	Cameo	

=== Television series ===
Year	Title	Role	Notes	Ref.
2016	Bring It On, Ghost	Im Seo-yeon		
2016	Golden Pouch	Keum Se-na		
2017	My Golden Life	Yoon Ha-jung		
2018	Number Six	Min Joo		
2019	At Eighteen			
2019	Secret Boutique	J-Boutique's employee	Cameo	
2019	Catch the Ghost	Ma Hye-jin	Cameo (Episode 4–5)	
2020	More Than Friends	Hwang Ji-hyun	Cameo (Episode 1 and 4)	

=== Music video appearances ===
Year	Song title	Artist	Ref.
2016	"Winter Palace" (겨울궁전)	Glow 9 (글로우나인)	
2019	"A Walk To Goodbye" (이별을 걷다)	Hwang Chi-yeul	
2019	"Phocha" (포장마차)	Hwang In-wook	
2019	"Sad Drinking" (이별주)	Hwang In-wook	

== Awards and nominations ==
Name of the award ceremony, year presented, category, nominee of the award, and the result of the nomination
Award ceremony	Year	Category	Nominee / Work	Result	Ref.
Seoul Webfest Film Festival	2019	Best Actress	Number Six	Won	
