= A Melody to Remember =

2016 film by Lee Han

- Theatrical release poster
- Hangul: 오빠생각
- RR: Oppasaenggak
- MR: Oppasaenggak
- Directed by: Lee Han
- Written by: Lee Woo-tak
- Produced by: Ha Jung-wan
- Starring: Yim Si-wan; Go Ah-sung; Lee Hee-joon; Lee Jun-hyeok; Jung Joon-won; Lee Re; Tang Jun-sang
- Cinematography: Hong Jae-sik
- Edited by: Nam Na-yeong
- Music by: Lee Jae-jin
- Production company: Joy Rabbit
- Distributed by: Next Entertainment World
- Release date: January 21, 2016
- Running time: 124 minutes
- Country: South Korea
- Language: Korean
- Box office: US$6.6 million

A Melody to Remember (Korean: 오빠생각) is a 2016 South Korean drama film directed by Lee Han and stars Yim Si-wan, Go Ah-sung, and Lee Hee-joon. Based on the true story of a children's choir during the Korean War, it tells the story of children who have lost everything and a soldier who protects them, as they find hope through singing on the battlefield. Distributed by Next Entertainment World, the film was released in South Korea on January 21, 2016.

== Synopsis ==
A soldier, Han Sang-yeol, has lost both his beloved family and the comrades he was meant to protect in the war. By chance, he receives a transfer order and is stationed at a new unit in Busan, where he meets children who have lost their parents and are left on their own.

Gradually moved by the children's innocence, he begins to open his heart. Together with volunteer teacher Park Joo-mi, he forms a children's choir and starts teaching them to sing. Their songs begin to touch the hearts of everyone caught in the midst of a war where life could be lost at any moment.

== Cast ==
- Yim Si-wan as Han Sang-yeol
- Go Ah-sung as Park Joo-mi
- Lee Hee-joon as Galgori
- Lee Jun-hyeok as Master Sergeant Jo
- Jung Joon-won as Dong-goo
- Lee Re as Soon-yi
- Tang Jun-sang as Chun-sik
- Park Soo-young as Colonel Park
- Kim Young-jae as Dong-goo's father
- Kim Yun-tae as Chun-sik's father
- Kim Hyang-gi as Han Sun-mi

== Production ==
A Melody to Remember is based on a real-life children's choir active during the Korean War. Approximately 30 child actors were selected through multiple rounds of auditions and underwent several months of vocal and choir training prior to filming, with an emphasis on performing and recording songs using their natural voices rather than stylized methods.

== Release ==
A Melody to Remember was first screened for press and distributors on January 6, 2016 in Seoul. The film's main trailer was released ahead of its theatrical premiere on January 21, 2016.

== Reception ==
Award	Year	Category	Recipient(s)	Result	Ref.
18th Udine Far East Film Festival	2016	Audience Award	A Melody to Remember	Won	
