= Honey Sweet =

- Theatrical release poster
- Hangul: 달짝지근해: 7510
- Lit.: Sweet Water: 7510
- RR: Daljjakjigeunhae: 7510
- MR: Taltchakchigŭnhae: 7510
- Directed by: Lee Han
- Written by: Lee Byeong-heon
- Produced by: Kim Jae-joong
- Starring: Yoo Hae-jin; Kim Hee-sun; Cha In-pyo; Jin Seon-kyu; Han Sun-hwa
- Cinematography: Lee Tae-yoon
- Edited by: Nam Na-yeong
- Music by: Jo Yeong-wook
- Production company: Movie Rock
- Distributed by: Mindmark
- Release date: August 15, 2023
- Running time: 118 minutes
- Country: South Korea
- Language: Korean
- Box office: US$10.8 million

Honey Sweet (Korean: 달짝지근해: 7510; RR: Daljjakjigeunhae: 7510) is a 2023 South Korean romantic comedy film directed by Lee Han and written by Lee Byeong-heon. It stars Yoo Hae-jin, Kim Hee-sun, Cha In-pyo, Jin Seon-kyu, and Han Sun-hwa. The film was theatrically released on August 15, 2023. It was screened at the 28th Busan International Film Festival (BIFF) in 'Korean Cinema Today - Panorama' section on October 5, 2023.

== Synopsis ==
Chi-ho is a pastry researcher with a highly developed sense of taste whose life revolves around snacks and confectionery. His routine changes when Il-young, an optimistic and straightforward woman, enters his life and exposes him to experiences and flavors outside his usual routine. As Chi-ho adjusts to these changes, he becomes involved with several people, including his carefree and shameless brother Seok-ho, the self-absorbed CEO of the pastry company Byung-hoon, and the unpredictable and passionate Eun-sook. Their interactions challenge Chi-ho's established routines and lead him to confront aspects of life beyond his carefully controlled existence.

== Cast ==
- Yoo Hae-jin as Cha Chi-ho
- Kim Hee-sun as Lee Il-young
- Cha In-pyo as Cha Seok-ho
- Jin Seon-kyu as Byung-hoon
- Han Sun-hwa as Paeng Eun-sook
- Jung Da-eun as Lee Jin-ju
- Lee Jun-hyeok as Dong-woo
- Yoon Byung-Hee as Park Seung-jun
- Hyun Bong-Sik as Ajeossi
- Lee Ji-hoon as In-guk
- Jung Woo-sung as Lee Yuk-gu
- Yeom Hye-ran as pharmacist
- Yim Si-wan as couple guy
- Go Ah-sung as couple girl
- Woo Hyun as fried chicken shop owner

== Production ==
Principal photography began in mid-July 2022 and wrapped on October 13.

== Release ==
Honey Sweet was released theatrically in South Korea on August 15, 2023, distributed by Mindmark. The release date was confirmed in July 2023, with the film scheduled to open during the August 15 public holiday.

The film was subsequently invited to the 28th Busan International Film Festival, where it was screened on October 5, 2023, as part of the "Korean Cinema Today – Panorama" section.

== Reception ==
=== Box office ===
According to the Korean Film Council's integrated computer network, the film grossed US$9,822,134 at the local box office and accumulated 1,388,309 admissions from 1,032 screens.

=== Accolades ===
Award	Date of ceremony	Category	Recipient(s)	Result	Ref.
Blue Dragon Film Awards	November 24, 2023	Best Director	Lee Han	Nominated	
Blue Dragon Film Awards	November 24, 2023	Best Actor	Yoo Hae-jin	Nominated	
Blue Dragon Film Awards	November 24, 2023	Best Supporting Actress	Han Sun-hwa	Nominated	
Chunsa Film Art Awards	December 7, 2023	Best Actress	Kim Hee-sun	Nominated	
Chunsa Film Art Awards	December 7, 2023	Special Jury Award – Director	Lee Han	Won	
Chunsa Film Art Awards	December 7, 2023	Special Jury Award – Actor	Yoo Hae-jin	Won	
