= More Than Friends (TV series) =

2020 South Korean television series

- Promotional poster
- Hangul: 경우의 수
- Hanja: 境遇의 數
- Lit.: Number of Cases (Note: The Korean title can also be translated to Kyung Woo's Soo, after the two main characters' names.)
- RR: Gyeonguui su
- MR: Kyŏnguŭi su
- Genre: Romantic drama
- Created by: JTBC
- Written by: Jo Seung-hee
- Directed by: Choi Sung-bum
- Starring: Ong Seong-wu; Shin Ye-eun; Kim Dong-jun
- Country of origin: South Korea
- Original language: Korean
- No. of episodes: 16

Production
- Running time: 70 minutes
- Production companies: JTBC Studios; Zium Contents

Original release
- Network: JTBC
- Release: September 25 – November 28, 2020

More Than Friends (Korean: 경우의 수) is a South Korean television series starring Ong Seong-wu, Shin Ye-eun and Kim Dong-jun. It aired on JTBC from September 25 to November 28, 2020.

== Synopsis ==
Ten years ago, Kyung Woo-yeon was as innocent and carefree as any eighteen year old might be. With dreams and ambitions and a heart ready to love, it was only a matter of time before she fell for her friend, Lee Soo. Little did she know that at the time, Lee Soo also had a crush on her. Unfortunately, a simple misunderstanding kept them from confessing their feelings.

A decade later, Woo-yeon still harbors a crush on Soo. Working as a calligrapher, she still keeps in touch with her friend but has never confessed her feelings for him. Oddly enough, the same could be said for Soo, who is now working as a professional photographer. Though the two have taken turns having a crush on each other for over ten years, misunderstandings and missed timings have continued to keep them from becoming anything more than friends.

With feelings ten years in the making, Woo-yeon and Soo begin to realize their feelings for each other are becoming too strong to keep hidden. Has the time for their confessions finally come or will yet another misunderstanding keep them apart?

== Cast ==
=== Main ===
- Ong Seong-wu as Lee Soo
  - Ha Yi-an as young Lee Soo

A well-known photographer and Woo-yeon's friend since high school. He used to be very popular in school due to his looks, and he often appeared cold. He later realizes his feelings for Woo-yeon when she starts to date Jun-soo. He despises his parents for neglecting him and focusing on their divorce.

- Shin Ye-eun as Kyung Woo-yeon
  - Shim Hye-yeon as young Woo-yeon

A cheerful person who received awards in school, but now works as a calligrapher and has a part-time job. She had a crush on Lee Soo for over ten years, but got rejected twice. She dates men thinking she will fall for them after dating, but her conflicting feelings for Lee Soo always gets in the way.

- Kim Dong-jun as On Joon-soo

The CEO of a huge publishing house. His first love ends up being his sister-in-law. He falls in love with Woo-yeon after a few encounters.

=== Supporting ===
- Pyo Ji-hoon as Jin Sang-hyuk

A good friend of the group who owns a small restaurant, Tonight, where the friends frequently meet.

- Baek Soo-min as Han Jin-Joo

A rich prosecutor who has never dated, and Woo-yeon's best friend.

- Ahn Eun-jin as Kim Young-hee
  - Ahn Se Bin as young Young-hee

An ordinary office worker who despises her mother, and has been in a relationship with Hyun-jae for over ten years. She avoids marrying Hyun-jae because of her poor family.

- Choi Chan-ho as Shin Hyun-jae

Young-hee's boyfriend. He has been wanting to marry her for a long time, but patiently waits till Young-hee is ready.

- Ahn Nae-sang as Lee Young-hwan

Lee Soo's father, who still has feelings for his wife even after getting divorced. He is a retired judge.

- Kim Hee-jung as Choi Won-jung

Lee Soo's mom, who is an artist.

- Jo Ryun as Park Mi-sook

Woo-yeon's mother.

- Seo Sang-won as Kyung Man-ho

Woo-yeon's father.

- Yang Hee-jae as Chul-soo
- Kang Yoon-je as Joon-young
- Oh Hee-joon as Min Sang-shik

Jun-su's good friend and colleague.

- Jung Mi-hyung as Min-ah
- Yoon Bok-in as Oh Yoon-ja

Young-hee's mother.

- Kim Dal-yul as Kim Chul-soo
- Baek Seo-yi as Hwang Ji-hyun
- Bae Da-bin as Kwon Yoo-ra

Lee Soo's 'girlfriend.

- Kim Dan-yool as Kim Chul-soo
  - Wang Hee-jae as young Chul-soo

=== Special appearance ===
- Woo Hyun as Mr. Han (ep. 2)

== Episodes ==
No.	English title	Korean title	Directed by	Written by	Original release date
1	"Chapter 1: More Than Friends"	1장 경우의 수	Choi Sung-bum	Jo Seung-hee	September 25, 2020
2	"Chapter 2: Wind, Wind, Wish"	2장 바람, 바람, 바람	Choi Sung-bum	Jo Seung-hee	September 26, 2020
3	"Chapter 3: After the Curse is Broken"	3장 저주가 풀리고 난 뒤	Choi Sung-bum	Jo Seung-hee	October 9, 2020
4	"Chapter 4: To Catch a Tiger, Go Into the Tiger's Den"	4장 호랑이를 잡으려면 호랑이굴로	Choi Sung-bum	Jo Seung-hee	October 10, 2020
5	"Chapter 5: Objects in Mirror are Closer Than They Appear"	5장 사물은 보이는 것보다 가까이 있습니다	Choi Sung-bum	Jo Seung-hee	October 16, 2020
6	"Chapter 6: What the Shepherd Boy Did Not Know"	6장 양치기 소년이 몰랐던 것	Choi Sung-bum	Jo Seung-hee	October 17, 2020
7	"Chapter 7: Where Did the Curse Go?"	7장 저주는 어딘가에	Choi Sung-bum	Jo Seung-hee	October 23, 2020
8	"Chapter 8: Opportunities Lost Become Regrets"	8장 놓친 기회는 후회가 된다	Choi Sung-bum	Jo Seung-hee	October 24, 2020
9	"Chapter 9: The Function of Efforts"	9장 노력의 기능	Choi Sung-bum	Jo Seung-hee	October 30, 2020
10	"Chapter 10: Misunderstanding Called Understanding"	10장 이해라는 오해	Choi Sung-bum	Jo Seung-hee	October 31, 2020
11	"Chapter 11: The End"	11장 The End	Choi Sung-bum	Jo Seung-hee	November 6, 2020
12	"Chapter 12: A Wound Deeper Than Love"	12장 사랑보다 깊은 상처	Choi Sung-bum	Jo Seung-hee	November 7, 2020
13	"Chapter 13: Attitude Towards What We Love Too Much"	13장 너무 사랑하는 것들을 대하는 자세	Choi Sung-bum	Jo Seung-hee	November 13, 2020
14	"Chapter 14: Pinocchio's Nose Pushes People Away"	14장 피노키오의 코는 사람을 밀어낸다	Choi Sung-bum	Jo Seung-hee	November 14, 2020
15	"Chapter 15: The Reason for Walking Away"	15장 뒷모습의 이유	Choi Sung-bum	Jo Seung-hee	November 27, 2020
16	"Chapter 16: Every Moment Was a Coincidence"	16장 나의 모든 순간이 너였다	Choi Sung-bum	Jo Seung-hee	November 28, 2020

== Original soundtrack ==
More Than Friends OST

Soundtrack album by Various Artists
- Released: 2020
- Genre: Soundtrack
- Languages: Korean; English

=== Part 1 ===
Released on September 26, 2020
No.	Title	Lyrics	Music	Artist	Length
1.	"Serendipity" (우연일까)	midnight; TM	midnight; TM	Ha Sung-woon	3:20
2.	"Serendipity" (Inst.)		midnight; TM		3:20
Total length:					6:40

=== Part 2 ===
Released on October 9, 2020
No.	Title	Lyrics	Music	Artist	Length
1.	"Highlight"	Naomi; Ra.L	Ra.L; Rebin	Ra.L	3:29
2.	"Highlight" (Inst.)		Ra.L; Rebin		3:29
Total length:					6:58

=== Part 3 ===
Released on October 10, 2020
No.	Title	Lyrics	Music	Artist	Length
1.	"Sweet Dream"	Kim Eun-jae; Ryu Hye-nee	Kim Eun-jae	J_ust; Kim Chae-won (April)	3:18
2.	"Sweet Dream" (Inst.)		Kim Eun-jae		3:18
Total length:					6:36

=== Part 4 ===
Released on October 17, 2020
No.	Title	Lyrics	Music	Artist	Length
1.	"I'm Still Here" (오늘도 난 그 자리에 있어)	midnight	Gaemi; midnight	Ben	4:32
2.	"I'm Still Here" (Inst.)		Gaemi; midnight		4:32
Total length:					9:04

=== Part 5 ===
Released on October 23, 2020
No.	Title	Lyrics	Music	Artist	Length
1.	"Close Your Eyes"	Kim Beom-ju; Kim Si-hyuk	Kim Beom-ju; Kim Si-hyuk	Bernard Park	3:47
2.	"Close Your Eyes" (Inst.)		Kim Beom-ju; Kim Si-hyuk		3:47
Total length:					7:34

=== Part 6 ===
Released on October 24, 2020
No.	Title	Lyrics	Music	Artist	Length
1.	"Late Regret" (왜 몰랐었을까)	Gaemi; midnight	Gaemi; midnight	Ong Seong-wu	4:23
2.	"Late Regret" (Inst.)		Gaemi; midnight		4:23
Total length:					8:46

=== Part 7 ===
Released on October 31, 2020
No.	Title	Lyrics	Music	Artist	Length
1.	"Spider Lily" (피안화)	Jang Young-soo; 4Batter; Park Jae-hoo	Jang Young-soo; 4Batter; Park Jae-hoo; Glody	Yoo Yeon-jung (Cosmic Girls)	3:09
2.	"Spider Lily" (Inst.)		Jang Young-soo; 4Batter; Park Jae-hoo; Glody		3:09
Total length:					6:18

=== Part 8 ===
Released on November 7, 2020
No.	Title	Lyrics	Music	Artist	Length
1.	"Falling Slow"	Kevin Oh; Han Ji-won	Gaemi	Kevin Oh	3:49
2.	"Falling Slow" (Inst.)		Gaemi		3:49
Total length:					7:28

=== Part 9 ===
Released on November 14, 2020
No.	Title	Lyrics	Music	Artist	Length
1.	"Each Other" (서로)	Kim Yoon-ju	Kim Yoon-ju	Rooftop Moonlight	3:18
2.	"Each Other" (Inst.)		Kim Yoon-ju		3:18
Total length:					6:36

== Production ==
=== Development ===
Early working title of the series is Number of Cases Friends Become Lovers (친구에서 연인이 되는 경우의 수; Chingueseo yeonini doeneun gyeonguui su).

=== Casting ===
On February 18, 2020, news outlet Osen reported that Ong Seong-wu would play the lead role of the series. The same day, another news outlet revealed that Shin Ye-eun would be Ong's co-star. Fantagio and Npio Entertainment (Ong and Shin's respective agencies) confirmed that they were both positively reviewing the offer, but nothing had been decided yet. On March 25, Kim Dong-jun's agency confirmed that the actor had joined the main cast. The final lineup was confirmed on April 9.

=== Filming ===
Part of the filming took place on Jeju Island. Production was halted during the last week of August 2020 after Kim Hee-jung came in contact with Kim Won-hae, who tested positive for COVID-19, on another filming set. Filming resumed after the tests came back negative.

== Release ==
The first trailer for the series was released on August 7, 2020. The second trailer was released in August 20 and revealed that the series would premiere on September 18. On September 4, the premiere was postponed by a week after filming was halted at the end of August.

== Ratings ==
Average TV viewership ratings
Ep.	Original broadcast date	Nationwide average audience share
1	September 25, 2020	1.510%
2	September 26, 2020	1.438%
3	October 9, 2020	1.612%
4	October 10, 2020	1.611%
5	October 16, 2020	1.336%
6	October 17, 2020	1.572%
7	October 23, 2020	1.318%
8	October 24, 2020	1.131%
9	October 30, 2020	1.442%
10	October 31, 2020	1.529%
11	November 6, 2020	1.499%
12	November 7, 2020	1.412%
13	November 13, 2020	1.448%
14	November 14, 2020	1.311%
15	November 27, 2020	1.324%
16	November 28, 2020	1.260%
Average		1.422%

- In the table above, the blue numbers represent the lowest ratings and the red numbers represent the highest ratings.
- This drama aired on a cable channel/pay TV which normally has a relatively smaller audience compared to free-to-air TV/public broadcasters (KBS, SBS, MBC and EBS).
