= Almost Love (2006 film) =

- Theatrical release poster
- Hangul: 청춘만화
- Hanja: 靑春漫畵
- RR: Cheongchun manhwa
- MR: Ch'ŏngch'un manhwa
- Directed by: Lee Han
- Written by: Lee Han
- Produced by: Han Seong-gu
- Starring: Kwon Sang-woo; Kim Ha-neul
- Cinematography: Lee Jun-gyu
- Edited by: Shin Min-kyung
- Music by: Kim Min-gyu
- Distributed by: Showbox
- Release date: 23 March 2006
- Running time: 116 minutes
- Country: South Korea
- Language: Korean
- Budget: US$3 million
- Box office: US$9.1 million

Almost Love (Korean: 청춘만화; RR: Cheongchun manhwa; lit. 'Youth Comic') is a 2006 South Korean romantic drama film. It was directed by Lee Han, starring Kwon Sang-woo and Kim Ha-neul. Distributed by Showbox, it was released on March 23, 2006, and runs 116 minutes.

== Plot ==
Ji-hwan is a taekwondo student with a part-time job as a stunt man, who dreams of becoming Korea's answer to Jackie Chan. Dal-rae is a drama student and aspiring actress, but tends to fail auditions because of her timid personality. The two are old friends who have grown up together, but their relationship becomes complicated when they each start dating other people.

== Cast ==
- Kwon Sang-woo as Ji-hwan
  - Park Ji-bin as young Ji-hwan
- Kim Ha-neul as Dal-rae
  - Jung Min-ah as young Dal-rae
- Lee Sang-woo as Moon Young-hoon
- Jang Mi-inae as Kim Ji-min
- Jung Gyu-soo as Dal-rae's father
- Choi Jong-ryul
- Kang Ki-hwa
- Lee Young-lan
- Lee Kyung-jin as Jin Dal-rae's mother
- Park Kyeong-hwan
- Ku Hye-ryeong
- Jo Deok-je

== Release ==
Almost Love was released in South Korea on March 23, 2006, and topped the box office on its opening weekend with 539,307 admissions. It held the number one spot for a second consecutive weekend, going on to receive a total of 2,066,354 admissions nationwide, with a gross of US$9,131,392.
