= Innocent Witness =

- Theatrical release poster
- Hangul: 증인
- RR: Jeungin
- MR: Chŭngin
- Directed by: Lee Han
- Written by: Lee Han; Moon Ji-won
- Produced by: Kim Jae-joong; Lee Jun-woo; Kim Woo-jae
- Starring: Jung Woo-sung; Kim Hyang-gi
- Cinematography: Lee Tae-yoon
- Edited by: Nam Na-yeong
- Music by: Jo Yeong-wook
- Production companies: Movie Rock; Studio By The Library
- Distributed by: Lotte Entertainment
- Release date: February 13, 2019
- Running time: 129 minutes
- Country: South Korea
- Language: Korean
- Box office: US$17.2 million

Innocent Witness (Korean: 증인; RR: Jeungin) is a 2019 South Korean legal drama film directed by Lee Han, starring Jung Woo-sung and Kim Hyang-gi. The film was released in South Korea on February 13, 2019.

== Synopsis ==
Soon-ho is an attorney who needs to pay his father's debt. One day, he is engaged to deal with a murder case: Mi-ran, a housekeeper, is accused of murdering her employer. Mi-ran claims that she found her employer dead in his own room. The only witness in this case is an autistic high school student named Ji-woo. To convince Ji-woo to attend the trial as a witness, Soon-ho decides to meet her, and befriends her in order to prove her testimony was false.

== Cast ==
=== Main ===
- Jung Woo-sung as Soon-ho
- Kim Hyang-gi as Ji-woo

=== Supporting ===
- Lee Kyu-hyung as Hee-joong
- Yeom Hye-ran as Mi-ran
- Jang Young-nam as Hyun-jung
- Jung Won-joong as Byung-woo
- Kim Jong-soo as Man-ho
- Kim Seung-yoon as Shin-hye
- Lee Eun-saem as High school student
- Nam Sang-ji as smiling lawyer

=== Special appearance ===
- Park Geun-hyung as Kil-jae
- Song Yoon-ah as Soo-in
- Lee Jun-hyeok as Yoon-jae
- Lee Re as Kyung-hee

== Production ==
Principal photography began on July 7, 2018, and wrapped on October 10, 2018.

== Awards and nominations ==
Awards	Category	Recipient	Result	Ref.
55th Baeksang Arts Awards	Grand Prize	Jung Woo-sung	Won	
55th Baeksang Arts Awards	Best Actor	Jung Woo-sung	Nominated	
55th Baeksang Arts Awards	Best Actress	Kim Hyang-gi	Nominated	
55th Baeksang Arts Awards	Best Supporting Actress	Yeom Hye-ran	Nominated	
55th Baeksang Arts Awards	Best Screenplay	Lee Han, Moon Ji-won	Nominated	
39th Golden Cinema Film Festival	Grand Prize	Jung Woo-sung	Won	
40th Blue Dragon Film Awards	Best Actor	Jung Woo-sung	Won	
6th Korean Film Producers Association Awards	Best Actor	Jung Woo-sung	Won	
27th Korean Culture and Entertainment Awards	Best Actress	Kim Hyang-gi	Won	
39th Korean Association of Film Critics Awards	Best Actress	Kim Hyang-gi	Won	
56th Grand Bell Awards	Best Film	Innocent Witness	Nominated	
56th Grand Bell Awards	Best Actor	Jung Woo-sung	Nominated	
56th Grand Bell Awards	Best Actress	Kim Hyang-gi	Nominated	
56th Grand Bell Awards	Best Supporting Actress	Yeom Hye-ran	Nominated	
56th Grand Bell Awards	Best Screenplay	Lee Han, Moon Ji-won	Nominated	
56th Grand Bell Awards	Best Cinematography	Lee Tae-yoon	Nominated	
