= Wedding Dress (film) =

- Theatrical poster
- Hangul: 웨딩드레스
- RR: Wedingdeureseu
- MR: Wedingdŭresŭ
- Directed by: Kwon Hyung-jin
- Written by: Yoo Young-ah
- Produced by: Choi Sun-joong; Choi Pyeong-ho; Na Gyeong-chan
- Starring: Song Yoon-ah; Kim Hyang-gi; Jeon Mi-seon; Kim Yeo-jin; Kim Ye-ryeong; Jung In-seo; Lee Ki-woo
- Cinematography: Baek Dong-hyeon
- Edited by: Park Gok-ji; Jeong Jin-hui
- Music by: Mok Young-jin
- Production company: Road Pictures
- Distributed by: Sidus FNH
- Release date: January 14, 2010
- Running time: 109 minutes
- Country: South Korea
- Language: Korean

Wedding Dress (Korean: 웨딩드레스) is a South Korean drama film, released on January 14, 2010.

== Plot ==
Go-eun (Song Yoon-ah), a wedding dress designer and single mom, has only a limited number of days to live. Before parting from her young daughter So-ra (Kim Hyang-gi), Go-eun wants to do everything she can for her, including making a beautiful wedding dress for So-ra for the future. As her condition worsens, So-ra finds out about the cancer and tries to fulfill her mother's wishes one by one, in secret.

== Cast ==
- Song Yoon-ah as Seo Go-eun
- Kim Hyang-gi as Jang So-ra
- Kim Myeong-gook as Jeong-woon
- Jeon Mi-seon as Ji-hye
- Kim Yeo-jin as Mi-ja
- Kim Ye-ryeong as Yeo-woon
- Jung In-seo as Jung-ahn
- Lee Ki-woo as Ji-hoon
- Min Ah-ryeong as Soo-ran
- Chae Sang-woo as Min-woo
- Kwon Soo-hyeon as Min-hye
- Kim Dong-yeop as Yeo-woon's son
- Kim Soo-ha as Jin-ah
- Ji Woo as Jin-ah's friend 1
- Ko Joo-yeon as Jin-ah's friend 2
- Lee Seung-yeon as So-ra's homeroom teacher
- Kim Tae-jeong as Ko-woon's friend
- Yang Jin-sung as adult So-ra
- Tae In-ho as resident.
