= Traveler (South Korean TV series) =

Korean television entertainment program

- Season 2 promotional poster
- Hangul: 트래블러
- RR: Teuraebeulleo
- MR: T'ŭraebŭllŏ
- Genre: Reality television Travel documentary
- Starring: Various actors
- Country of origin: South Korea
- Original language: Korean
- No. of seasons: 2
- No. of episodes: 20 (list of episodes)

Production
- Production locations: South Korea, Cuba, Argentina
- Camera setup: Multi-camera
- Running time: 67–80 minutes
- Production company: JTBC

Original release
- Network: JTBC
- Release: 21 February 2019 – 18 April 2020

Traveler (Korean: 트래블러) is a South Korean television entertainment program which airs on JTBC. It is about actors going on a backpacking trip.

The first season features Ryu Jun-yeol and Lee Je-hoon as they travel to Cuba. It aired on Thursdays from 21 February to 25 April 2019.

The second season features Ahn Jae-hong, Kang Ha-neul and Ong Seong-wu as they travel to Argentina. It was broadcast on Saturdays from 15 February to 18 April 2020.

== Overview ==
=== Season 1 ===
The program is about two travelers, who went to Cuba, that combines trips and documentaries whom take a backpacking trip and enjoy a variety of experiences in the local area. For two weeks (26 December 2018 – 10 January 2019), both travelers backpacked in Cuba to learn about Che Guevara's freedom and revolution, Buena Vista Social Club's brilliant melodies and enjoy the refreshing feeling of old cars (1950s to 1970s) and mojito. This backpacking trip is without the interference of the production crews and both travelers have to make decisions of their choice together on finding private accommodations, known as casa, eating and transportation.

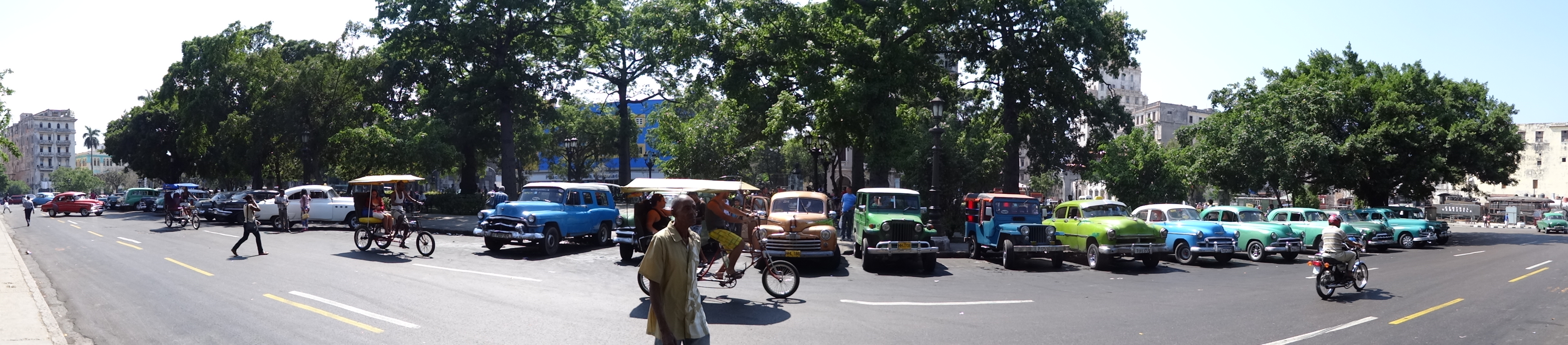
Vintage cars of 1950s – 1970s in Havana

=== Season 2 ===
New travelers Ahn Jae-hong, Kang Ha-neul and Ong Seong-wu visit Argentina. For two weeks (30 November – 12 December 2019), the trio became real travelers in the original landscape of Argentina and enjoyed the beauty of a dozen times more colorful than their changing attire. They will go to places like Iguazu Falls, Perito Moreno Glacier and fighting against the wind on the road across Patagonia.

== Airtime ==
Season	Air date	Airtime
1	21 February – 25 April 2019	Thursdays at 11:00 PM KST
2	15 February – 18 April 2020	Saturdays at 7:40 PM KST

== Cast ==
=== Season 1 ===
Name	Episode	Ref.
Ryu Jun-yeol	1 – 10	
Lee Je-hoon	3 – 10	

=== Season 2 ===
Name	Episode	Ref.
Ahn Jae-hong	1 – 10	
Kang Ha-neul	1 – 10	
Ong Seong-wu	1 – 10	

== Episodes ==
=== Season 1 (2019) ===
List of episodes in Season 1

Ep.	Broadcast date	Day	Filming date	Location	Notes
1	21 February 2019	1 – 3	26–28 December 2018	Havana	Je-hoon was not available for Day 1 to 6 due to filming schedule conflict with 2018 SBS Drama Awards.; Jun-yeol arrived at Havana late evening of Day 1 and checked-in to his casa.; Jun-yeol travelled and photo-taking within Havana in Day 2 & 3.
2	28 February 2019	4 – 5	29–30 December 2018	Havana	Je-hoon was not available for Day 1 to 6 due to filming schedule conflict with 2018 SBS Drama Awards.; Jun-yeol arrived at Havana late evening of Day 1 and checked-in to his casa.; Jun-yeol travelled and photo-taking within Havana in Day 2 & 3.
2	28 February 2019	4 – 5	29–30 December 2018	Viñales	Jun-yeol did not go to Viñales in the afternoon of Day 4 as his private car did not arrive. He managed to get another car and arrived at Viñales in the evening.
3	7 March 2019	6	31 December 2018	Viñales	Jun-yeol celebrated New Year's Day in Viñales.
3	7 March 2019	7	1 January 2019	Havana	Jun-yeol returned to Havana to meet Je-hoon who finally arrived in Cuba.
4	14 March 2019	8	2 January 2019	Havana	Je-hoon toured around Havana with Jun-yeol as the tour guide on Day 8 & 9.
4	14 March 2019	9	3 January 2019	Havana	—
5	21 March 2019	9	3 January 2019	Playa Girón	Jun-yeol and Je-hoon set off to Playa Girón on the second half of the Day 9 and arrived in the evening.
6	28 March 2019	10	4 January 2019	Playa Girón	Jun-yeol and Je-hoon loaned 2 bicycles and ride around Playa Girón.; They were not able to rent a car for the next day (Day 11) to Trinidad as there were no cars available, instead they booked a 10:30 am bus ride.
7	4 April 2019	11	5 January 2019	Playa Girón	Jun-yeol and Je-hoon managed to arrive on time at the bus station to get on the bus to Trinidad.
7	4 April 2019	11	5 January 2019	Trinidad	After arriving at Trinidad in the afternoon, they spend some time to get accommodation for 4 nights and 3 days stay in Trinidad.; Jun-yeol explore part of Trinidad while Je-hoon stays at the casa.; After Jun-yeol return to the casa, Jun-yeol & Je-hoon left the casa for their dinner at the city.
7	4 April 2019	12	6 January 2019	Trinidad	After breakfast, they decide to go separate ways to explore different places in Trinidad.
8	11 April 2019	12	6 January 2019	Trinidad	They have a miscommunication of the meeting place at the Plaza but is still able to meet up.; After a late lunch, they end the day by visiting Playa Caribe beach to enjoy the sunset scene.
8	11 April 2019	13	7 January 2019	Trinidad	After breakfast, they took a train ride to visit The Manaca Iznaga Tower (the tallest lookout tower ever built in the Caribbean sugar region) at Valle de los Ingenios.
9	18 April 2019	14	8 January 2019	Trinidad	They left the casa very early in the morning to see the sunrise on a radio tower hill.; They managed to get a taxi to Varadero. The journey took 4 hours.
9	18 April 2019	14	8 January 2019	Varadero	After the hotel check-in, they visit the beach to enjoy the scenic view of the beach.
10	25 April 2019	15 – 16	9 – 10 January 2019	Varadero	In the morning, they woke up early to walk at the beach before having their breakfast.; They managed to get a taxi reservation for the afternoon travel to Havana.
10	25 April 2019	15 – 16	9 – 10 January 2019	Havana	They arrived at Havana in the late afternoon.; The production team showed a short clip of Jun-yeol visiting his aunt and her family in Mexico City during his layover from Seoul to Havana (26 December 2018).; Director's Cut & recap of the places visited and people they met.

=== Season 2 (2020) ===
List of episodes in Season 2

Ep.	Broadcast date	Day	Filming date	Location	Notes
1	15 February 2020	1	30 November 2019	Buenos Aires	"They Don't Know Soccer, But Argentina Anyway": Jae-hong, Ha-neul & Seong-wu arrived at the Buenos Aires Airport after 31 hours of flight and were surprised that idol fans were at the airport to catch a glimpse of Seong-wu.; After arriving at the accommodation, they visited the city centre to exchange currency and get SIM cards.; They visited the Obelisk and La Boca.
2	22 February 2020	2	1 December 2019	Buenos Aires	"Skydiving Surprise": Jae-hong, Ha-neul & Seong-wu had decided to do individual travel for the first half of the day.; Seong-wu visited July 9 Avenue and did tai chi in the park.; Jae-hong visited a cafe recommended on Google for brunch.; Ha-neul had brunch and studying the script for a new theatre play.; On the Sunday afternoon, they visited San Telmo market which stretch out 1.3 km (0.81 mi) between Plaza de Mayo and Plaza Dorrego.; They walked and bought some souvenirs; After the market tour, they made a reservation of the skydiving for the following day.; They had their dinner in a famous steakhouse and spent the rest of the evening listening to live music and watch tango dance performances in an old tango bar.
3	29 February 2020	3	2 December 2019	Buenos Aires	"When the Parachute Opens": They took a transport, provided by the skydiving company, to the airfield for their skydiving experience.; Jae-hong and one of the production staff are the first to do the skydiving while Ha-neul & Seong-wu will skydive on the second flight. Both group will dive from 3,000 m (9,800 ft) above ground.
3	29 February 2020	4	3 December 2019	Puerto Iguazu	They took a two hours flight to Puerto Iguazu and spent a night in the hotel.
3	29 February 2020	5	4 December 2019	Puerto Iguazu	"Throat on a Rainy Day": Their plan is to visit Iguazu Falls, one of the three great waterfalls in the world, located at Iguazú National Park.; They start the visit by walking on the Green Trail → Lower Trail towards the Devil's Throat waterfall.; The next waterfall is Salto San Martin, second in size after Devil's Throat. They were amazed by the view of the waterfall up close.; They took a train ride to Devil's Throat waterfall as they have a boat tour reservation.; After the Iguazu Falls tour, they return to the hotel and had dinner at a restaurant.
4	7 March 2020	5	4 December 2019	Puerto Iguazu	
4	7 March 2020	6	5 December 2019	El Calafate	"Unexpected Room": They took a flight to Cordoba, then to El Calafate.; After arriving at their accommodation and will be their home for the next five days. They made enquires on bicycle rental from the staff of the service apartment.; They ride their bicycles around the neighbourhood and Lago Argentino to enjoy the windy weather.; After returning their bicycles, they move their belongings to their room. They were surprised that there was an additional room (with 2 beds) in the basement.; They decided to dine out for dinner due to the travelling schedule. They enjoyed their meal and the view of the sunset from the restaurant.
5	14 March 2020	6	5 December 2019	El Calafate	
6	21 March 2020	7	6 December 2019	El Calafate	"Everything About the Glacier Is Mysterious": Ha-neul is the only traveller who decided to have breakfast at their accommodation while Jae-hong and Seong-wu skipped.; After breakfast, they visited Perito Moreno Glacier, located in the Los Glaciares National Park. They are accompanied by a local guide.; Before reach their destination, the bus stopped at Argentino Lake and Andes for the travellers to take pictures.; The bus also stopped at Mirador de los Suspiros (Balcony of Sighs) for the view of the glaciers at a distance. The strong wind causes the camera of the production team to shake a lot.; After reaching the Los Glaciares National Park, they headed to the observatories to see the Perito Moreno Glacier up close.; The glacier has an average height of 74 m (243 ft), width of 5 km (3.1 mi) and length of 30 km (19 mi). The area of glacier (250 km^{2}) is bigger than the size of Buenos Aires (203 km^{2}).; They are overwhelmed by the enormous size of the glacier.; They notice the difference in the gray colour of the water on the left of glacier as it is due to the lime in the water while the right side is blue.; The local guide explains that they might be lucky to witness the collapse (or rupture) of the ice tunnel, that happens every 2 or 3 years, on the glacier as many broadcasting companies will come to make documentaries and television programs.; They decided to eat some gimbap while wait for the glacier to calve (fall). They were able to witness the calving of the glacier after over an hour of waiting.; As it approaches midday, more calving of the glacier are captured by the production team.; After lunch, they took a boat from the dock and reach the edge of the glacier for a mini-trekking experience. The trekking guide explained how the water holes (moulin) on the glacier is formed.; After trekking, they visited the supermarket to buy groceries to cook jjapaguri for their dinner. They were surprised at how cheap the price of ribeye and tenderloin are as compared to South Korea.
7	28 March 2020	7	6 December 2019	El Calafate	"Class of Fitz Roy": The trio start preparing the ingredients for jjapaguri. Jae-hong sets the table for the dinner, Seong-wu assists Jae-hong in cooking while Ha-neul go to get some eggs and olive oil from the owner of their accommodation (Linda). Linda loans Ha-neul a cast-iron pan for cooking the beef.; While Jae-hong and Seong-wu do the cooking, Ha-neul clears the clutter from the cooking area.; They enjoyed the dinner as they cleared the pot of noodles and ribeye. Seong-wu ended up washing the dishes after losing the rock-paper-scissors game while Jae-hong and Ha-neul relax outside the accommodation.
7	28 March 2020	8	7 December 2019	El Calafate	Ha-neul and Seong-wu sleep in while Jae-hong woke up early and explore the town.; After getting a rental car, the trio visit a store to get some camping gear followed by buying grocery to last for two days.
7	28 March 2020	9	8 December 2019	Fitz Roy	They drove 214 km (133 mi) to El Chaltén, the base for hiking Fitz Roy via Ruta 40. They stop at La Leona (a popular rest stop) to take a break and relieve their exhaustion.; After the short break, they continue to drive and arrive at the entrance of Los Glaciares National Park.; They admired the grandeur of Roy Fitz from afar.
8	4 April 2020	9	8 December 2019	Fitz Roy	"Camping with Vampires": As they left El Calafate early, they ate pizza and had a short break at El Chaltén.; After the meal and rest, they parked the car at El Pilar. From there, they will trek to base camp at Poincenot and make camp. The trekking course will take them 3 hours to complete.; The trekking trail will be led by 2 local guides for a group of more than 16 climbers. The trail will lead the group to an observatory overlooking a glacier (Piedras Blanca).; As they walk along the trail, they got to see the flora and fauna.; After an hour and half hours of trekking, they reached observatory overseeing Piedras Blanca glacier. After a short rest, they continue to trek to base camp at Poincenot.; After reaching the base camp, they go to the stream to get some drinkable water. They set up the tent after selecting a suitable spot and an area for cooking.; They start preparing for dinner and shared some of the beef with local guides.; Before sleeping, they put some raincoats over their backpacks outside the tent as it rained with strong wind.; They planned to wake up at 4 am and trek to Poincenot see the sunrise at 5.30 am.
9	11 April 2020	10	9 December 2019	Fitz Roy	"Time to Hunt the Flaming Sweet Potato": Jae-hong is the first to wake up and assess the situation of the windy and rainy condition. Even though the weather is not the best, the local guides assured that the bad weather will not affect the trekking to the peak to see the sunrise.; In order to see the "Flaming Sweet Potato" they have to climb up the rocky mountain via Blanco River to reach the peak of Fitz Roy.; They did not get to see much of sunrise at 5.30 am due to the cloudy weather. As the rain start to become heavier, Jae-hong decided that it is time for them to return to the campsite.; While descending from the peak, the sky cleared up and the Sun became visible. Their effort was not wasted as they are able to see the sunrise in Argentina for the first time but the scenery of "Flaming Sweet Potato" is still a mystery due to the poor weather condition.; After returning to the campsite, they pack up their backpack and exit the campsite. This marks the end of their 2-day camping trip and it is time to return to El Calafate.
9	11 April 2020	10	9 December 2019	El Calafate	This first thing that greets the trio is the yukgaejang (spicy beef soup) prepared by Linda, the owner of the accommodation. After washing up, the trio had a hearty spicy beef soup.; They visited a Gaucho farm, recommended by Linda. The windy weather on the pasture reminded them of the skydiving on day 3 of their adventure.; Jae-hong started his busking performance with Seong-wu. After enjoying their time at the farm with animals, they return to the accommodation.; As Ha-neul has to return to South Korea early due to his conflict of schedule with the filming of this show and theatre play.
9	11 April 2020	11	10 December 2019	El Calafate	Jae-hong and Seong-wu left their accommodation at 2.20 am as they have a very long trip ahead to their last destination, Ushuaia.; As there is no direct route to Ushuaia, the duo arrived at the bus station to get their tickets. The first bus left at 3 am and will travel 4 hours and 30 minutes to Rio Gallegos.
9	11 April 2020	11	10 December 2019	Rio Gallegos, Straits of Magellan & Tierra del Fuego, Chile	Rio Gallegos; They arrived at Rio Gallegos stopover at 7.30 am and have 2 hours of stopover time.; They found a bakery store and bought some breakfast. After breakfast, they return to the bus station for their trip towards Ushuaia.; After tagging their backpacks and fill up their Chilean disembarkation forms, they board the bus.; The bus departed at 9.30 am and will travel for 6 hours and 30 minutes. The trip will pass through the Argentina-Chile border, taking ferry through Straits of Magellan to Tierra del Fuego.; Straits of Magellan and Tierra del Fuego; While they were travelling on the ferry, they were lucky to see dolphins swimming along the ferry.; After reaching Tierra del Fuego, the duo board the bus again to cross the Chile-Argentina border which 157 km (98 mi) away. They arrived at the Chilean border at 3.30 pm.; After crossing back to Argentina, they have another 294 km (183 mi) to Ushuaia.
9	11 April 2020	11	10 December 2019	Ushuaia	After 18 hours, including the stopover, with the total distance of 877 km (545 mi), they finally arrived at Ushuaia at 9 pm.
10	18 April 2020	12	11 December 2019	Ushuaia	"Shouting for the Sky at the End of the World": Jae-hong and Seong-wu check-in to their lodging in Ushuaia. After checking-in, they went to town to have their first meal of the day, king crab.; After breakfast, they took photos of the "End of the World" sign (Fin del Mundo) and have their passports stamped with the "End of the World" at the visitor centre.
10	18 April 2020	12	11 December 2019	Buenos Aires	Ha-neul visited La Recoleta Cemetery on behalf of Jae-hong and Seong-wu due to their schedule on their first few days in Buenos Aires. The sole purpose is to visit the grave of Evita (Eva Perón).; On the way to the cemetery, the streets were crowded due to the celebration of the new President of Argentina.
10	18 April 2020	13	12 December 2019	Ushuaia	On the last day of the trip, Jae-hong and Seong-wu visited Harberton Farm in East of Ushuaia to see penguins. After a bumpy ride on the boat, they reached the Martillo island.; The tour guide explained the rules including to move slowly and not removing any objects on the island. Jae-hong and Seong-wu were fancinated with the Magellanic, Gentoo and King penguins and also the other travellers with professional photography equipment.; There were about 400 pairs of penguins living on Martillo island. They get to see the habitat of the penguins and baby penguins.; After the tour, they relunctantly return to the boat.; They board another boat to see Les Eclaireurs Lighthouse at the end of the world.; Jae-hong and Seong-wu ended the day having video call to Ha-neul (who is back in South Korea).
Ep.	Broadcast date	Day	Filming date	Location	Notes

== Original soundtrack ==
Traveler – Argentina Original Television Soundtrack

Soundtrack album by Various Artists
- Released: 2020
- Genre: Soundtrack
- Languages: Korean; English
- Label: Kakao M

=== Part 1 ===
Released on 16 February 2020
No.	Title	Lyrics	Music	Artist	Length
1.	"Traveler's Song" (떠나지 못할 이유는 없었다는 걸)	Harim	Harim	Harim	4:06
2.	"Traveler's Song" (Guitar Ver.)	Harim	Harim	Harim	4:46
3.	"Traveler's Song" (Inst.)		Harim		4:06
4.	"Traveler's Song" (Guitar Ver.) (Inst.)		Harim		4:46
Total length:					17:44

=== Part 2 ===
Released on 22 February 2020
No.	Title	Lyrics	Music	Artist	Length
1.	"Sometimes (Prod. Rocoberry)" (가끔은 그래도 괜찮아)	Conan; Roco	Conan	O.WHEN	3:14
2.	"Sometimes (Prod. Rocoberry)" (Inst.)		Conan		3:14
Total length:					6:28

=== Part 3 ===
Released on 29 February 2020
No.	Title	Lyrics	Music	Artist	Length
1.	"Before Sunrise (Prod. Kiggen)"	Kim Cho-yeon	Kiggen; Sean Michael Alexander; Drew Ryan Scott	Soyou	3:40
2.	"Before Sunrise (Prod. Kiggen)" (Inst.)		Kiggen; Sean Michael Alexander; Drew Ryan Scott		3:40
Total length:					7:20

=== Part 4 ===
Released on 14 March 2020
No.	Title	Lyrics	Music	Artist	Length
1.	"Flower (Prod. Rocoberry)" (꽃은 따라서)	Conan; Roco	Conan	Rothy	3:54
2.	"Flower (Prod. Rocoberry)" (Inst.)		Conan		3:54
Total length:					7:48

=== Part 5 ===
Released on 29 March 2020
No.	Title	Lyrics	Music	Artist	Length
1.	"Wish" (바람)	Jukjae	Jukjae	Jukjae	4:34
2.	"Wish" (Inst.)		Jukjae		4:34
Total length:					9:08

== Ratings ==
In these tables, the blue numbers represent the lowest ratings and the red numbers represent the highest ratings.

=== Season 1 ===
2019		AGB Nielsen
Ep.	Broadcast date	AGB Nielsen
1	21 February	3.137%
2	28 February	3.336%
3	7 March	2.339%
4	14 March	2.428%
5	21 March	2.449%
6	28 March	2.555%
7	4 April	2.721%
8	11 April	2.563%
9	18 April	2.223%
10	25 April	1.279%

=== Season 2 ===
2020		AGB Nielsen
Ep.	Broadcast date	AGB Nielsen
1	15 February	2.268%
2	22 February	2.137%
3	29 February	1.873%
4	7 March	2.462%
5	14 March	1.562%
6	21 March	2.416%
7	28 March	1.826%
8	4 April	2.322%
9	11 April	1.725%
10	18 April	1.858%
