= Go Ah-sung =

South Korean actress (born 1992)

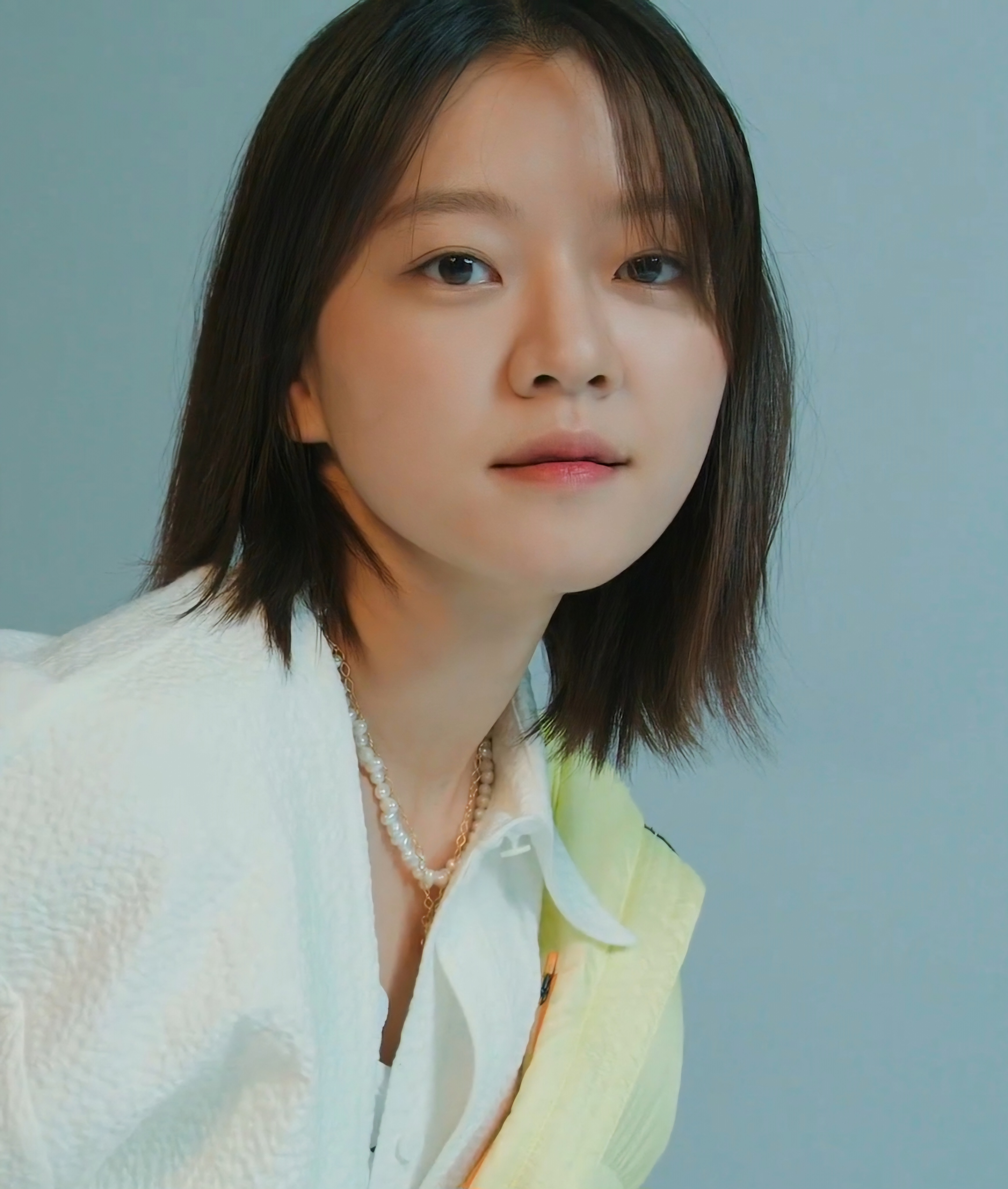
- Go in 2022
- Born: August 10, 1992 (age 34); Seoul, South Korea
- Education: Sungkyunkwan University, Psychology
- Occupation: Actress
- Years active: 2004–present

Korean name
- Hangul: 고아성
- Hanja: 高我星
- RR: Go Aseong
- MR: Ko Asŏng

Go Ah-sung (Korean: 고아성; born August 10, 1992) is a South Korean actress. She began her career as a child actress, notably in The Host (2006). Her other notable works include Snowpiercer (2013), Thread of Lies (2014), A Resistance (2019), Samjin Company English Class (2020), as well as the television series Master of Study (2010), Heard It Through the Grapevine (2015), and Life on Mars (2018).

== Career ==
Go Ah-sung was four years old when she appeared in her first commercial; when she was ten, she joined the 2002 stage musical Peter Pan. At thirteen, Go officially began her acting career in the KBS children's program Oolla Boolla Blue-jjang (2004).

Having worked together in the MBC omnibus drama Beating Heart (2005), actress Bae Doona recommended Go to director Bong Joon-ho when he was casting for his much-anticipated monster film. After an extensive audition process, Go made her film debut in 2006 with a starring role in The Host. Bong praised her work, saying that she "showed really mature acting for her age, and that's one of her defining charms as an actress." Go was also applauded by film critics, with Stephen Hunter of The Washington Post complimenting her "exquisite performance," and Megan Ratner of the Bright Lights Film Journal noting her "unforced naturalness, reminiscent not only of Ana Torrent but of Zazie's Catherine Demongeot." Go received several acting nominations, and won Best New Actress at the 2006 Blue Dragon Film Awards.

She continued her film career with supporting roles in The Happy Life (2007), Radio Dayz (2008), and A Brand New Life (2009). In 2010, Go appeared in the high school series Master of Study, a Korean drama adaptation of the Japanese manga Dragon Zakura. It scored the highest ratings in its timeslot during its run.

Go starred in her first leading role in Duet (2012), an indie romance about an aspiring Korean singer on a tour of England and the British guy she meets who shares her interests in music, photography and travel.

In 2013, she reunited with The Host costar Song Kang-ho in the blockbuster sci-fi thriller Snowpiercer, Bong Joon-ho's first English-language film. Go next appeared opposite Kim Hee-ae in Thread of Lies (2014), a film adaptation of Kim Ryeo-ryeong's novel Elegant Lies about a willful girl seeking the truth behind her sister's suicide.

Go signed with an American agency, Untitled Entertainment in 2014. She returned to television in 2015 with Heard It Through the Grapevine, a black comedy about the chaos an unplanned teenage pregnancy causes in a wealthy, powerful family. Go then headlined the mystery thriller Office, which made its world premiere in the Midnight Screenings section at Cannes; she won Best Actress at Fancine for her role as an intern who becomes a person of interest in a murder investigation.

In 2016, she featured in an episode of the Japanese television series, Midnight Diner. She then starred in war drama A Melody to Remember. The film won the audience award at the 18th Far East Film Festival.

In 2017, Go challenges her first romantic comedy in the MBC's drama Radiant Office, as a twentysomething woman who, after a suicide attempt and possible terminally-ill diagnosis, thinks she has nothing to lose and tackles her job and life with new perspectives.

In 2018, Go was cast in the South Korean adaptation of the UK series Life on Mars, as the sole female detective of the team. In 2019, Go returned to the big screen with historical film A Resistance.

Go led the 2020 critically-acclaimed and box office success dramedy film Samjin Company English Class, the winner of Best Film at the 57th Baeksang Arts Awards. She acted as an employee who mastered daily office works but accidentally discovered the company's water pollution.

In 2022, Go returned to TV series with the role of a tax investigator in the MBC and Wavve's financial thriller Tracer.

On February 3, 2026, Go parted ways with her agency, Artist Company. On May 7, Go made her theatrical Debut with the play, 'Uncle Vanya' held at LG Arts Center.

== Other activities ==
Go enjoys traveling alone and taking pictures. She became interested in photography through friend and frequent costar Bae Doona. Go's photographs were exhibited at the 5th annual Seoul Open Art Fair in 2010, alongside artwork by Ha Jung-woo and photos by Uhm Tae-woong.

Another of her interests is music. She did her own singing for the film Duet, and has performed live on stage at Mudaeruk in Hongdae.

Go majored in Psychology at Sungkyunkwan University.

== Filmography ==
=== Film ===
Year	Title	Role	Notes	Ref.
2006	The Host	Park Hyun-seo		
2007	The Happy Life	Joo-hee		
2008	Radio Dayz	Soon-deok		
2009	A Brand New Life	Ye-shin		
2009	After the Banquet	Kim Mi-rae		
2010	Sixteen		Short film	
2012	Duet	Nancy		
2013	Snowpiercer	Yona		
2014	Thread of Lies	Man-ji		
2015	Office	Lee Mi-rye		
2015	The Beauty Inside	Woo-jin		
2015	Right Now, Wrong Then	Yeom Bo-ra		
2016	A Melody to Remember	Park Joo-mi		
2017	The King	Miss Kim		
2019	A Resistance	Yu Gwan-sun		
2020	Samjin Company English Class	Lee Ja-young		
2023	Honey Sweet	Serenade Woman	Cameo	
2023	Because I Hate Korea	Joo Kye-na		
2025	Time of Cinema	Director	Segment: "Naturally"	
2026	Pavane	Mi-jung	Netflix	
2026	Nervous	Eun-byeol		
2027	Yeto	Deok-hee		

=== Television series ===
Year	Title	Role	Notes	Ref.
2004	Oolla Boolla Blue-jjang	Noh Da-ji (Princess Blue Stone)		
2005	Sad Love Story	young Cha Hwa-jung		
2005	Beating Heart	Kim Bo-mi		
2010	Master of Study	Gil Pul-ip		
2015	Heard It Through the Grapevine	Seo Bom		
2016	Midnight Diner: Tokyo Stories	Rei / Yoona		
2017	Radiant Office	Eun Ho-won		
2018	Life on Mars	Yoon Na-young		
2021	Crime Puzzle	Yoo-hee		
2022	Tracer	Seo Hye-young		
2023	Doona!	Im Ha-yeon	Cameo (episode 1–2, 6–8)	
2024	Good Partner	Lee Han-na	Cameo (episode 16)	

=== Television shows ===
Year	Title	Role	Ref.
2020	K-Ocean Pathfinders	Cast member	
2025	Edward Lee's Country Cook	Cast member	

== Stage ==
=== Theater ===
Theater performance
Year	Title		Role	Theater	Date	Ref.
Year	English	Korean	Role	Theater	Date	Ref.
2026	Uncle Vanya	바냐 삼촌	Sonya	LG Signature Hall, LG Arts Center	May 7-31	

== Discography ==
=== Singles ===
Title	Year	Album
"Go" (Korean: 달려; RR: Dallyeo) (with Ernest, Park Ji-yeon and Go Ah-sung)	2010	Master of Study OST Part 2
"Nobody Knows"	2012	Duet OST
"Light On My Shoulder"	2012	Duet OST
"Blue Blue Night"	2012	Duet OST
"Wings of Rod"	2012	Duet OST
"Hongdae Entrance" (Korean: 홍대입구; RR: Hongdae ipgu) (with Kwak Tae-hoon, Go Ah-sung and Young Jay)	2015	Non-album single

== Accolades ==
=== Awards and nominations ===
Name of the award ceremony, year presented, category, nominee of the award, and the result of the nomination
Award ceremony	Year	Category	Nominee / Work	Result	Ref.
APAN Star Awards	2015	Excellence Award, Actress in a Serial Drama	Heard It Through the Grapevine	Nominated	
APAN Star Awards	2018	Excellence Award, Actress in a Miniseries	Life on Mars	Won	
Baeksang Arts Awards	2007	Best New Actress – Film	The Host	Nominated	
Baeksang Arts Awards	2010	Best New Actress – Television	Master of Study	Nominated	
Baeksang Arts Awards	2014	Best Supporting Actress – Film	Snowpiercer	Nominated	
Baeksang Arts Awards	2015	Best New Actress – Television	Heard It Through the Grapevine	Won	
Baeksang Arts Awards	2019	Best Actress – Film	A Resistance	Nominated	
Baeksang Arts Awards	2021	Best Actress – Film	Samjin Company English Class	Nominated	
Baeksang Arts Awards	2026	Best Actress – Film	Pavane	Nominated	
Blue Dragon Film Awards	2006	Best New Actress	The Host	Won	
Blue Dragon Film Awards	2013	Best Supporting Actress	Snowpiercer	Nominated	
Blue Dragon Film Awards	2019	Best Leading Actress	A Resistance	Nominated	
Blue Dragon Film Awards	2024	Best Leading Actress	Because I Hate Korea	Nominated	
Blue Dragon Film Awards	2026	Best Actress	Pavane	Pending	
Buil Film Awards	2021	Best Actress	Samjin Company English Class	Nominated	
Chunsa Film Art Awards	2021	Best Actress	Samjin Company English Class	Nominated	
Director's Cut Awards	2006	Best Actress	The Host	Won	
Fantastic Film Festival of the University of Málaga	2015	Best Actress	Office	Won	
Golden Cinematography Awards	2016	Popularity Award, Actress	Office	Won	
Grand Bell Awards	2007	Best Supporting Actress	The Host	Nominated	
Grand Bell Awards	2013	Best Supporting Actress	Snowpiercer	Nominated	
Jeonju International Film Festival	2014	Moët Rising Star Award	Go Ah-sung	Won	
KBS Drama Awards	2010	Best New Actress	Master of Study	Nominated	
Korean Film Awards	2006	Best Supporting Actress	The Host	Nominated	
Korea Film Actors Association Awards	2016	Popularity Award	A Melody to Remember	Won	
Korea Movie Star Awards	2007	Best Young Star	The Host	Won	
MBC Birth of a Star	1995	King of Kings	Go Ah-sung	1st place	
MBC Drama Awards	2017	Top Excellence Award, Actress in a Miniseries	Radiant Office	Nominated	
MBC Drama Awards	2022	Excellence Award, Actress in a Miniseries	Tracer	Nominated	
Saturn Awards	2007	Best Performance by a Younger Actor	The Host	Nominated	
SBS Drama Awards	2015	Excellence Award, Actress in a Drama Special	Heard It Through the Grapevine	Won	
SBS Drama Awards	2015	New Star Award	Heard It Through the Grapevine	Won	
The Seoul Awards	2018	Best Supporting Actress	Life on Mars	Nominated	

=== Listicles ===
Name of publisher, year listed, name of listicle, and placement
Publisher	Year	Listicle	Placement	Ref.
Korean Film Council	2021	Korean Actors 200 (Note: Introduces 200 actors that best represent the present and future of Korean cinema to the people in the film industry all over the world.)	Included	
