= Ong Seong-wu =

South Korean singer and actor (born 1995)

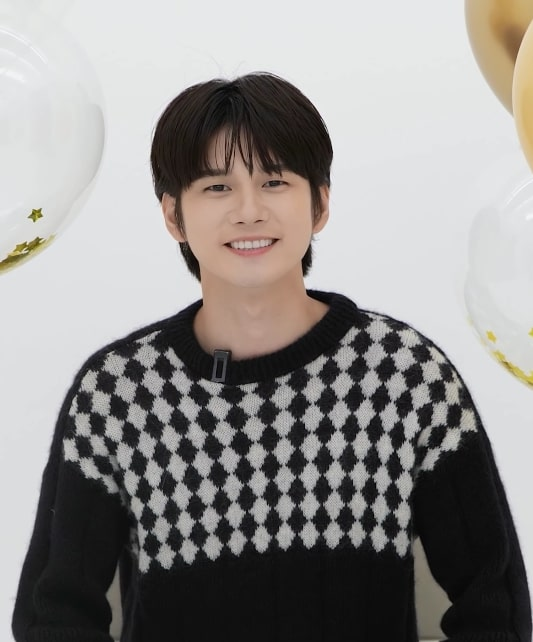
- Ong in October 2021
- Born: August 25, 1995 (age 31); Incheon, South Korea
- Education: Dong Seoul University
- Occupations: Singer; actor
- Years active: 2017–present
- Musical career
- Genres: K-pop; synth; soft rock; R&B
- Instrument: Vocals
- Labels: Fantagio; YMC (Note: As a member of Wanna One only.); Swing
- Formerly of: Wanna One

Korean name
- Hangul: 옹성우
- Hanja: 邕聖祐
- RR: Ong Seongu
- MR: Ong Sŏngu
- Website: fantagio.kr

Signature
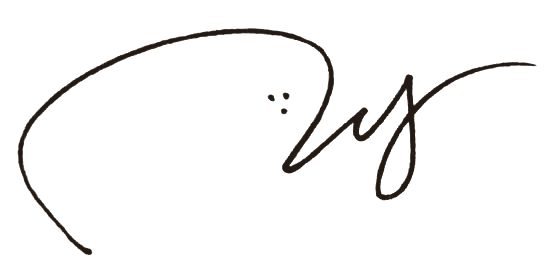

Ong Seong-wu (Korean: 옹성우, born August 25, 1995) is a South Korean singer and actor. He is known for his participation in the survival reality show Produce 101 Season 2, where he finished in fifth place, and is a former member of the show's derivative boy group Wanna One. Following Wanna One's disbandment, Ong made his acting debut with the drama At Eighteen (2019) directed by Shim Na-yeon. He also established his career as a solo artist with the release of his first extended play, Layers, on March 25, 2020.

== Early life ==
Ong Seong-wu was born in Incheon, South Korea. He is the youngest of two children, with one older sister. He attended Guwol Middle School, followed by Hanlim Multi Art School, graduating in 2014. He graduated from Dong Seoul University as dance and acting major. Ong also danced professionally as part of several street and B-boy dance teams during this period.

Ong was encouraged by his mother to pick up a musical instrument and started playing the drums after his sister began learning the piano. While playing the drums at a band contest in 2008, Ong was scouted as a trainee by the now-defunct entertainment company Lion Media. However, internal troubles with the company and its eventual closure lead to the delay of his debut, and contractual issues prevented him from signing with other companies for a period of time. In August 2016, he signed as an acting trainee with his current company Fantagio at the recommendation of one of his university professors.

== Career ==
=== Pre-debut: Produce 101 ===
Despite being an acting trainee, Ong was sent as a representative by his company to participate in Produce 101 (season 2) due to his well-rounded skills in singing and dancing. He achieved an 'A' rank in the evaluations and finished in fifth place in the finale with 984,756 votes. As part of the top eleven contestants, he would go on to debut as a member of Wanna One.

Prior to his participation in Produce 101, Ong took part in a short film project Short Film Project: Beginning. The short film, titled Seong-wu Is Alright, was released on June 19, 2017. Additionally, he made a special appearance on the mobile drama Idol Fever, which aired between July 7 to July 17, 2017.

=== 2017–2018: Debut with Wanna One ===
Ong debuted as a member of the project group Wanna One on August 7, 2017. He went on to represent the group in several appearances on variety shows such as Happy Together, The Return of Superman, and Saturday Night Live Korea. He also served as a special emcee on music show broadcasts for M Countdown and Inkigayo. Ong, together with fellow group mate Kang Daniel, was cast for the pilot episode of the variety show Master Key, and was later confirmed as a fixed cast member. His appearance on the show garnered positive reactions from media outlets, receiving praise for his skillful deception of his cast mates in the psychological game-style show to net the show's biggest win thus far.

In November, Ong featured in singer Huh Gak's music video for his digital single "Only You".

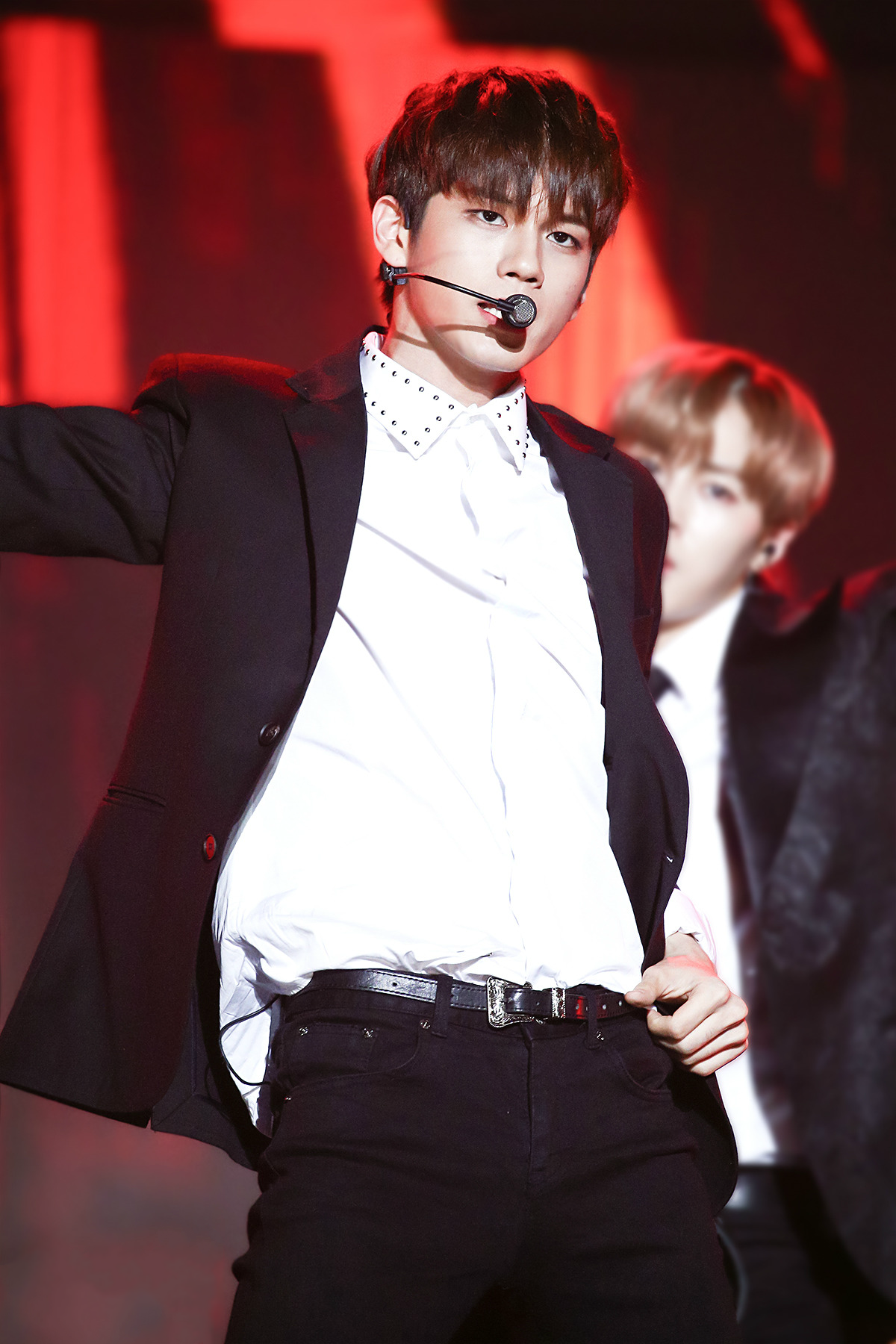
Ong at 2018 Soribada Best K-Music Awards

In February 2018, Ong was named one of the main emcees of Show! Music Core. He subsequently left his position in September 2018. He also continued appearing on several variety shows. He appeared on Living Together in Empty Room with Kang Daniel and Kim Jae-hwan, and also became a cast member of the reality show Law of the Jungle Sabah, with his fellow group mate Ha Sung-woon, which aired from July 27, 2018, to September 21, 2018.

His contract with Wanna One ended on December 31, 2018. However, he continued to appear with the group until its official farewell concerts on January 24–27, 2019.

=== 2019–present: Acting endeavours and solo activities ===
Upon conclusion of his activities with Wanna One, Ong embarked on his first solo fan-meeting tour, titled "Eternity", in March and April 2019. On March 7, 2019, he was also named PR Ambassador of the Incheon Office of Education.

As part of Pepsi and Starship Entertainment's 2019 Pepsi K-Pop Collab Project, Ong released the single "Heart Sign". The track was written by producers Flowblow, who penned Wanna One's hit debut single, "Energetic". The music video was released on June 11, 2019.

Ong made his acting debut in the later half of the year, starring as the male lead in JTBC's youth drama At Eighteen, alongside Kim Hyang-gi and Shin Seung-ho. The drama tackles some of the issues faced by youths in South Korea, such as first love, the pressures of school and parental expectation, to topics such as school violence and bullying. Ong played the role of transfer student Choi Jun-woo, who is falsely accused of school violence. He garnered many positive reviews for his emotive acting, and went on to nab several awards for the role, including Best Rookie Award and Hallyu Star Award at the Korea Drama Awards. and made Ong nominated at the 56th Baeksang Arts Awards. In the Best New Actor – Television category. Ong also recorded the song "Our Story" as part of the official soundtrack for the drama, which was released on August 8, 2019.

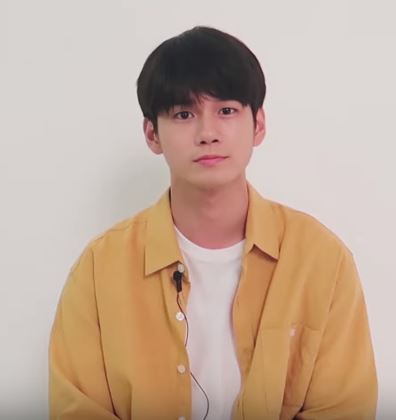
Ong for Marie Claire Korea in September 2019

In January 2020, Ong kicked off his second solo fan-meeting tour, titled "We Belong". The digital single "We Belong" was released on January 9. Intended as a fan-song, Ong participated in both the lyric writing and composition of the single, and performed it on the first time during the Seoul leg of his tour on January 11.

Ong appeared on the second season of travel variety show, Traveler, with fellow actors Ahn Jae-hong and Kang Ha-neul. The variety show focused on the backpacking travels of the trio in Argentina, and began airing starting February 15. He received much attention for his photography skills in the first episode.

Ong made his comeback as a singer with his first solo album, Layers. The EP was released on March 25, together with lead single, "Gravity". Ong took part in the composition and lyric writing of all the songs on the album, drawing his inspiration from his emotions and stories from the past year.

He also made several appearances on variety shows, including Omniscient Interfering View, as well as Master in the House, Radio Star, and Running Man. He also featured on You Hee-yeol's Sketchbook, performing his new single and displaying his drumming skills on the show's live music format.

Ong collaborated with singer Baek Ji-young on the duet "Didn't Say Anything". The ballad was released on May 12.

Ong began starring as the male lead in the JTBC drama More Than Friends, alongside Shin Ye-eun and Kim Dong-jun, playing photographer Lee Soo. The drama premiered 25 September. The song "Late Regret" was recorded and released by Ong as part of the drama's soundtrack.

Furthermore, Ong will also be making his film debut in the upcoming musical-movie, Life is Beautiful, starring Ryu Seung-ryong and Yum Jung-ah. The film will go to theatres in second half of 2022. Ong will also star in the movie, Jung's Ranch with Ryu Seung-ryong and Park Hae-joon. This will mark his second collaboration with Ryu.

In 2021, Ong has been confirmed to appear in the drama Shall We Have A Cup of Coffee? It airs on KakaoTV and is confirmed to join the Netflix film Seoul Vibe, which is expected to air in 2022. Ong appeared alongside dancer, Noze, in Lee Seung-hwan and Sunwoo Jung-a's music video for the song "How could you", released on November 18, 2021.

In 2022, Ong announced that the fan meeting 'RE:MEET' will be held for the second time in March 2022, which will be held offline and online.

In 2025, Ong will participate in the play Shakespeare in Love as Shakespeare.

== Personal life ==
=== Military service ===
Fantagio announced that Ong would enlist for his mandatory military service as an active duty soldier on April 17, 2023. He was discharged on October 16, 2024.

== Discography ==
=== Extended plays ===
Title	Details	Peak chart positions	Sales
Title	Details	KOR	Sales
Layers	Released: March 25, 2020; Label: Fantagio Music; Formats: CD, digital download, streaming; Track listing: 1. Gravity; 2. Café (너를 위한 카페); 3. After Dark (또, 다시 나를 마주한 채); 4. Bye Bye; 5. Guess Who; 6. We Belong	3	KOR: 70,106

=== Singles ===
==== As lead artist ====
Title	Year	Peak chart positions	Album
Title	Year	KOR	Album
"We Belong"	2020	— (Note: "We Belong" did not enter the Gaon Digital Chart, but peaked at number 55 and 76 on the Gaon Download Chart and the Gaon BGM Chart, respectively.)	Layers
"Gravity"	2020	107	Layers
"—" denotes releases that did not chart or were not released in that region.

==== Other releases ====
Title	Year	Peak chart positions	Album
Title	Year	KOR	Album
Promotional
"Heart Sign"	2019	186	Non-album single
Soundtrack appearances
"Our Story" (우리가 만난 이야기)	2019	195	At Eighteen OST
"Late Regret" (왜 몰랐었을까)	2020	— (Note: "Late Regret" did not enter the Gaon Digital Chart, but peaked at number 77 on the Gaon BGM Chart.)	More Than Friends OST
Collaborations
"Didn't Say Anything" (아무런 말들도) (with Baek Ji-young)	2020	81	Non-album single
"—" denotes releases that did not chart or were not released in that region.

== Filmography ==
Key
†	Denotes films that have not yet been released

=== Film ===
Year	Title	Role	Notes	Ref.
2017	Seong-wu Is Alright	Seong-wu	Short film	
2022	Seoul Vibe	Jun-gi		
2022	Life Is Beautiful	Jung-woo		
2022	20th Century Girl	Poong Jun-ho / Joseph	Cameo	
TBA	Jung's Ranch †	Kang Jung-hoon		
TBA	Starlight Falls †	Choi Kyung-soo		

=== Television series ===
Year	Title	Role	Notes	Ref.
2019	At Eighteen	Choi Jun-woo		
2020	More Than Friends	Lee Soo		
2023	Strong Girl Nam-soon	Kang Hee-sik		
2026	Boyfriend on Demand	Bae Hyeon-woo	Cameo	
2026	Spooky in Love	Kang Min-hwan		

=== Web series ===
Year	Title	Role	Notes	Ref.
2017	Idol Fever	Himself	Cameo (Ep. 1–2)	
2021	Would You Like a Cup of Coffee?	Kang Go-bi		

=== Television shows ===
Year	Title	Role	Notes	Ref.
2017	Produce 101 season 2	Contestant	Finished 5th	
2017	Master Key	Cast member	with Kang Daniel	
2018	Living Together in Empty Room	Cast member	with Kang Daniel and Kim Jae-hwan	
2018	Show! Music Core	Co-host	with Kang Mi-na and Mark Lee	
2018	Law of the Jungle Sabah	Cast member	with Ha Sung-woon	
2020	Traveler season 2	Cast member	with Ahn Jae-hong and Kang Ha-neul	

== Theater ==
Year	Title	Role	Ref.
2025	Shakespeare in Love	Will Shakespeare	

== Awards and nominations ==
Name of the award ceremony, year presented, category, nominee of the award, and the result of the nomination
Award ceremony	Year	Category	Nominee / Work	Result	Ref.
Asia Artist Awards	2019	Rookie Actor Award	At Eighteen	Won	
Asia Model Awards	2020	Popular Star Award	Ong Seong-wu	Won	
Baeksang Arts Awards	2020	Best New Actor – Television	At Eighteen	Nominated	
Baeksang Arts Awards	2020	TikTok Popularity Award – Male	At Eighteen	Nominated	
Baeksang Arts Awards	2023	Best New Actor – Film	Life Is Beautiful	Nominated	
Blue Dragon Film Awards	2022	Best New Actor	Life Is Beautiful	Nominated	
Dong-A.com's Pick	2019	Want To See Your Next Project Award	Ong Seong-wu	Won	
Grand Bell Awards	2022	Best New Actor	Life Is Beautiful	Nominated	
Grand Bell Awards	2022	New Wave Award	Life Is Beautiful	Won	
Korea Drama Awards	2019	Best New Actor	At Eighteen	Won	
Korea Drama Awards	2019	Hallyu Star Award	At Eighteen	Won	
Seoul Music Awards	2021	Fan PD Artist Award	Ong Seong-wu	Nominated	
Soribada Best K-Music Awards	2020	Bonsang Award	Ong Seong-wu	Nominated	
StarHub Night of Stars	2019	Most Promising Actor	At Eighteen	Won	
