= Thread of Lies =

- Theatrical release poster
- Directed by: Lee Han
- Written by: Lee Sook-yeon; Lee Han
- Based on: Elegant Lies by Kim Ryeo-ryeong
- Produced by: Kim Jae-joong; Noh Bong-jo; Kim Dong-woo
- Starring: Kim Hee-ae; Go Ah-sung; Kim You-jung; Kim Hyang-gi
- Cinematography: Lee Seung-hyeob
- Edited by: Nam Na-yeong
- Music by: Lee Jae-jin
- Production companies: Ubu Film; Movie Rock
- Distributed by: CGV Movie Collage (domestic); CJ Entertainment (international)
- Release date: March 13, 2014
- Running time: 117 minutes
- Country: South Korea
- Language: Korean
- Budget: US$2 million
- Box office: US$14.1 million

Thread of Lies (Korean: 우아한 거짓말; RR: Uahan geojinmal; lit. 'Elegant Lies') is a 2014 South Korean drama film based on the 2009 bestselling novel Elegant Lies by Kim Ryeo-ryeong. Directed by Lee Han, it starred Kim Hee-ae (in her first film in 21 years), Go Ah-sung, Kim You-jung and Kim Hyang-gi.

Thread of Lies deals with the aftermath of a suicide by a 14-year-old girl. The nonlinear narrative follows her mother and older sister who set out to solve the mystery of her death, insinuating themselves into the life of the girl who bullied her.

== Plot ==
Hyun-sook (Kim Hee-ae) is a widowed single mother who is raising two teenage daughters while working at a big grocery store. One day, her youngest child, 14-year-old Cheon-ji (Kim Hyang-gi) suddenly commits suicide by hanging without even leaving a note. To Hyun-sook and her older daughter Man-ji (Go Ah-sung), Cheon-ji was the sweet child of the family who rarely complained and studied hard, while always trying to comfort her hardworking, often-weary mother. Struggling with guilt and anger, and not knowing why Cheon-ji chose to kill herself, the two women wonder whether there was something they missed or something they could have said or done. Flashbacks of Cheon-ji's past show that she had been the victim of cruel acts of bullying at her middle school, led by Hwa-yeon (Kim You-jung), the prettiest and most popular girl in class whose true callous and manipulative nature hides a tortured soul.

== Cast ==
- Kim Hee-ae as Hyun-sook
- Go Ah-sung as Lee Man-ji
- Kim You-jung as Kim Hwa-yeon
- Kim Hyang-gi as Lee Cheon-ji
- Yoo Ah-in as Choo Sang-bak
- Sung Dong-il as Kwak Man-ho
- Chun Woo-hee as Kwak Mi-ran
- Yoo Yeon-mi as Kwak Mi-ra
- Park Soo-young as Mr. Im
- Kim Jung-young as Hwa-yeon's mother
- Lee Jae-gu as Hwa-yeon's father
- Kim Ji-hoon as Hyun-sook's co-worker, the dumplings guy
- Jang Ah-young as Teacher Lee
- Lee Young-eun as Mi-so
- Park Ji-young as Soo-kyung
- Han Sung-yong as Park, Chinese restaurant delivery man

== Critical reception ==
Luke Ryan Baldock of The Hollywood News called it "the best film of the year so far," with "the best exploration of bullying ever seen on-screen, as well as being an uplifting tale of life after death and the importance of understanding." He also praised the script as "brave" for "[tackling] such complex issues in a fair, balanced, and non-judgmental way," and the acting as "miraculous across the board, with the young cast taking centre stage and representing the full gamut of emotions."

Describing it as a "superbly constructed drama," Richard Kuipers of Variety wrote, "Rarely, if ever, has the topic of teenage bullying been examined in such forensic detail and delivered with such devastating emotional impact," and that "helmer Lee Han maintains perfect tonal control and elicits fine performances from a predominantly female cast."

== Box office ==
Thread of Lies was released in theaters on March 13, 2014. It took the No. 1 spot at the domestic box office, the first local film to do so in six weeks, by drawing 182,620 viewers on its opening weekend. According to the Korean Film Council, the film had approximately 680,000 admissions in its first week, earning ₩3.86 billion (or US$3.61 million).

Through positive word of mouth, the small-budget film (₩2.1 billion, or US$1.96 million) grossed more than US$8 million by its second week with 1.2 million admissions, maintaining a strong showing at the box office and online reservation sites, despite competition from Noah, 300: Rise of an Empire and other imported films. Distributor CGV Movie Collage said the film initially had problems going into production because investors doubted its mainstream appeal. But the film resonated with audiences, in a country where suicide, particularly among youths, is a major social issue (Korea has the highest suicide rate among developed/OECD countries). Select theaters screened a barrier-free version, with subtitles/narration for the blind and hearing impaired. Special screenings also took place for student and teacher groups, and the main cast members participated in an anti-school bullying campaign on March 27, 2014.

After 32 days in cinemas, the film grossed ₩11.6 billion (US$11.2 million) from 1,619,188 admissions.

== Awards and nominations ==
Year	Award	Category	Recipient	Result
2014	50th Baeksang Arts Awards	Best Actress	Kim Hee-ae	Nominated
2014	50th Baeksang Arts Awards	Best New Actress	Kim Hyang-gi	Won
2014	23rd Buil Film Awards	Best New Actress	Kim Hyang-gi	Nominated
2014	51st Grand Bell Awards	Best New Actress	Kim Hyang-gi	Nominated
2014	35th Blue Dragon Film Awards	Best Actress	Kim Hee-ae	Nominated
2014	35th Blue Dragon Film Awards	Best New Actress	Kim You-jung	Nominated
2015	45th Giffoni Film Festival	Cinecircoli Giovanili Socioculturali Award	Thread of Lies	Won
