= Punch (2011 film) =

- Theatrical poster
- Hangul: 완득이
- RR: Wandeugi
- MR: Wandŭgi
- Directed by: Lee Han
- Written by: Kim Dong-woo
- Based on: Wandeuk-yi by Kim Ryeo-ryeong
- Produced by: Kim Dong-woo; Ham Jeong-yeop; Bae Seong-eun
- Starring: Kim Yoon-seok; Yoo Ah-in
- Cinematography: Jo Yong-gyu
- Edited by: Nam Na-yeong
- Music by: Lee Jae-jin
- Production companies: Ubu Film; Another Pictures
- Distributed by: CJ E&M Pictures
- Release date: October 20, 2011
- Running time: 110 minutes
- Country: South Korea
- Language: Korean
- Box office: US$33.6 million

Punch (Korean: 완득이; RR: Wandeugi) is a 2011 South Korean coming-of-age film directed by Lee Han about the budding mentor-mentee relationship forged between a rebellious high school student from a poor household (Yoo Ah-in) and his meddlesome homeroom teacher who moves in next door (Kim Yoon-seok).

It is based on the bestselling novel Wandeuk by Kim Ryeo-ryeong, which has sold more than 700,000 copies since it was published in 2008.

== Plot ==
Eighteen-year-old Do Wan-deuk (Yoo Ah-in) lives with his hunchback father Jeong-bok (Park Su-yeong) and stuttering uncle Min-gu (Kim Young-jae), former cabaret clowns now having to work in open-air markets after the closure of the nightclub they used for many years. Wan-deuk never knew his mother, who walked out 17 years ago, and has become a young brawler. His unconventional high school teacher, Lee Dong-ju (Kim Yoon-seok), who treats all his students with equal harshness, lives on the rooftop next door and is always on Wan-deuk's back. Both are perpetually insulted by a grouchy neighbor (Kim Sang-ho), who lives with his younger sister Lee Ho-jeong (Park Hyo-joo), a writer of "existential martial arts novels" under the pen-name Moonbow. When Jeong-bok and Min-ju start going on the road looking for work, Jeong-bok asks Dong-ju to keep an eye on his son, and the two become closer. Dong-ju tells Wan-deuk his mother, Lee Suk-hee (Jasmine B. Lee) is actually a Filipina and working in a restaurant in Seongnam, a satellite city south of Seoul. Thanks to Dong-ju, mother and son finally meet for the first time. Meanwhile, Jeong Yun-ha (Kang Byul), the brightest pupil in class, has taken a liking to Wan-deuk after splitting with her boyfriend Hyeok-ju (Kim Dong-yeong). When Wan-deuk takes up kickboxing to funnel his aggression, Yun-ha helps him. But just when Wan-deuk has come to rely on Dong-ju's tutorship, the latter is arrested by the police for helping illegal immigrant workers.

== Cast ==
- Kim Yoon-seok ... Lee Dong-ju
- Yoo Ah-in ... Do Wan-deuk
  - Sung Yu-bin ... young Wan-deuk
- Park Soo-young .... Do Jeong-bok (Wan-deuk's Father)
- Kim Young-jae ... Nam Min-gu
- Jasmine B. Lee ... Lee Suk-hee (Wan-deuk's Mother)
- Kim Sang-ho ... middle-aged man from the house in front
- Park Hyo-joo ... Lee Ho-jeong
- Kang Byul ... Jeong Yun-ha
- Kim Dong-young ... Hyuk-joo
- Ahn Gil-kang ... Wank-deuk's Coach
- Oh Hee-joon as Wan Deuk group student
- Sudip Banerjee ... Hassan
- Jo Duk-je ... director of students
- Lee Jae-gu ... cabaret strongman
- Han Eun-sun ... cabaret female employee
- Lee Sol-gu ... street market man 2

== Differences from the novel ==
In a Q&A session after the world premiere at the Busan International Film Festival, director Lee Han stated that the female character Lee Ho-jeong, who was not in the original novel, was added as the love interest of high school teacher Lee Dong-ju to allow the audience to empathize with him more.

The ethnicity of Wan-deuk's mother was changed from Vietnamese in the novel to Filipina in the film.

== Reception ==
Punch brought to the forefront several of the less recognized features of a changing Korean cultural landscape: intercultural marriage and multicultural households, a growing population of migrant workers, an education system narrowly focused on preparation for university entrance examinations, and the economic vulnerability of the disabled. As such, no one expected the film to make a lot of money.

In drawing attention to multiculturalism and diversity, Punch attracted negative attention in its portrayal of migrant workers and foreigners as poor and leading difficult lives: "Jeong of Sangji University noted that foreign migrant workers and marriage immigrants are expressed in 'negative images presented in backward, filthy scenes' by Korean media." Countries like the Philippines have expressed disapprobation and reproach over portrayals of migrant workers, giving rise to anti-Korean sentiment.

But Punch sold 640,000 tickets on its opening week of release, then claimed the top spot at the box office for the second consecutive week by selling over two million tickets. The film's popularity grew through word of mouth, with an unprecedented number of schools, government offices, and private companies arranging for group viewings.

Punch eventually sold 5.3 million tickets in South Korea during its box office run. The movie ranks #3 for Korean film ticket sales in 2011 and #4 for ticket sales for all films released in South Korea in 2011.

It was also invited to the 2012 Berlin International Film Festival; it screened in Generation 14Plus, a competition section of Berlinale devoted to films for teens.

Commenting on the positive reception, director Lee Han told Yonhap News that the seemingly eclectic ensemble of characters who appear in Punch, though they rarely receive the limelight, are present and active as members of Korean society. Lee spoke of how the warmth and honesty with which he tried to portray these characters and introduce their daily lives has resonated with viewers.

Since the film's release, Filipina actress Jasmine B. Lee, a naturalized Korean, has become well known for playing the mother of the young protagonist. The recognition of her performance as an actress has also brought publicity to her social activities as the secretary general of Waterdrop, a charity she formed for migrant women, and as one of the first non-Korean civil servants at the Seoul Global Center. Her connection to the film has increased recognition of the variety of services available for foreigners living in Korea. She was later elected in 2012 as a proportional representative in South Korea's National Assembly, the first Filipina and naturalized Korean to become a lawmaker.

== Awards and nominations ==
Year	Award	Category	Recipient	Result
2011	Korean Institute of Film Application	Healing Movie of the Year	Punch	Won
2012	3rd KOFRA Film Awards	Best Actor	Kim Yoon-seok	Won
2012	3rd KOFRA Film Awards	Discovery Award	Yoo Ah-in	Won
2012	3rd KOFRA Film Awards	Public Relation Award	Lee Yoon-jung	Won
2012	62nd Berlin International Film Festival	Crystal Bear for Best Film	Punch	Nominated
2012	48th Baeksang Arts Awards	Best Film	Punch	Nominated
2012	48th Baeksang Arts Awards	Best Director	Lee Han	Nominated
2012	48th Baeksang Arts Awards	Best Actor	Kim Yoon-seok	Nominated
2012	14th Far East Film Festival	Black Dragon Award	Punch	3rd place
2012	21st Buil Film Awards	Best Director	Lee Han	Won
2012	21st Buil Film Awards	Best Actor	Kim Yoon-seok	Nominated
2012	21st Buil Film Awards	Best Actor	Yoo Ah-in	Nominated
2012	59th Film Festival Zlín	Ecumenical Jury Award	Punch	Won
2012	33rd Blue Dragon Film Awards	Best Actor	Kim Yoon-seok	Nominated
2012	33rd Blue Dragon Film Awards	Best Supporting Actress	Park Hyo-joo	Nominated
2012	16th Tallinn Black Nights Film Festival	Just Film Grand Prix for Best Film	Punch	Nominated
