= Kim Ryeo-ryeong =

South Korean writer (born 1971)

- Born: Kim Ryeo-ryeong; 1971 (age 54–55)
- Education: Seoul Institute of the Arts
- Occupation: Novelist
- Writing career
- Language: Korean

Korean name
- Hangul: 김려령
- Hanja: 金呂玲
- RR: Gim Ryeoryeong
- MR: Kim Ryŏryŏng

Kim Ryeo-ryeong (Korean: 김려령; born 1971) is a South Korean writer.

== Life ==
Kim Ryeo-ryeong was born in Seoul in 1971, and grew up in Seoul at her maternal grandmother's house, and in Daejeon at her paternal great-grandmother's house. As Kim grew up listening to old stories told by both her grandmothers, who would cook rice in a big iron pot placed over firewood, her childhood was greatly influenced by her grandmothers. When she lived with her great-grandmother, playing in a village that had many streams, she yearned to become a teacher and a policewoman. She was fascinated by her teacher who knew everything and did anything for her. Filled with the desire to ride in a police car, she once lied that she was lost. Kim and her friends walked into the local police station where a policeman gave them some bread, patiently listened to their stories, and drove them back home in his police car.

When Kim was in high school, she watched a Hong Kong movie called Yes, Madam, and immediately afterwards with her friends she signed up to learn kung fu. The craze lasted about a year, but her then-experience at a martial arts gym was useful in writing her bestseller young-adult novel Wandeuk, which includes a kickboxing gym as part of the background. In that story, she demonstrated such a realistic portrayal of the behavior and psychological state of a teenage boy that some readers said they felt as though a seventeen-year-old boy was living within the writer's heart. It also helped greatly that she maintained her friendship with her former kung fu class buddies who later became kickboxing coaches.

Only after turning thirty, could Kim, who had gotten married and had two children by then, enter the creative writing department of Seoul Institute of the Arts. Kim had a habit of taking notes when she heard an unusual mode of speech or met someone behaving in a striking manner, and this became a strong tool for the late starter. Compared to most other children's stories, Kim's works tend to introduce a great number of characters, all who have distinctive, and unique characteristics, earning her the critique "a writer with impressive characters."

== Work ==
Kim's work generally focuses on adolescent issues. Kim's characters are extremely typical, ordinary neighbors one might run into in any alley, but on taking a closer look they reveal hard-earned scars. The source of each character's wound is hidden behind their bittersweet smiles. Kim suggests that even the saddest life has its moments of sunshine. Kim also aims implicit criticism at people content with themselves, who achieve their success by trampling on others.

She has won multiple prizes for her writing including the Munhak Dongne Children's Literature Prize in 2007 for A Seahorse Lives in My Heart, Ma Hae-song Literary Award in 2007 for The Child Who Brought Memories, and Changbi Prize for Young Adult Fiction in 2007 for Wandeuk.

Wandeuk was immediately successful with readers, and was declared the "best novel of the year" in an online poll conducted by bookstore Aladdin, Internet blog portal Egloos and Allblog. The book went on to sell more than 700,000 copies, and was made into a successful film in 2011, titled Punch for its foreign release.

Another novel, Elegant Lies (2009), was adapted into the 2014 film Thread of Lies directed by Lee Han, the same director behind Punch.

== Awards ==
- 2007 Munhak Dongne Children's Literature Prize (A Seahorse Lives in My Heart)
- 2007 Ma Hae-song Literary Award (The Child Who Brought Memories)
- 2007 Changbi Prize for Young Adult Fiction (Wandeuk)
- 2008 Korean Literature Prize of the First Blogger's Literature Grand Award (Wandeuk)

=== Works in English ===
None

=== Works in Korean (Partial) ===
- The Child Who Brought Memories (Gieokeul gajeoon ai 2007)
- A Seahorse Lives in My Heart (Nae gaseume haemaga sanda 2007)
- Wandeuk (Wandeuk 2008)
- I Must Become Famous (Naneun kkok yumyeonghaejyeoya dwae 2007)
- Loud and Boisterous Green Apartment (Yoranyoran pureun apateu 2008)
- Crafty Sevens (Angkeumhan ilgopsal 2009)
- Elegant Lies (Uwahan geojitmal 2009)
- Have You Ever Seen That Person? (Geu sarameul bon jeogi innayo? 2011)

== See also ==
- Korean literature
- List of Korean novelists
- List of Korean female writers
