= At Eighteen =

2019 South Korean television series

- Promotional poster
- Also known as: 18 Moments; A Moment at Eighteen
- Hangul: 열여덟의 순간
- Lit.: Moment of Eighteen
- RR: Yeoryeodeolbui sungan
- MR: Yŏryŏdŏlbŭi sun'gan
- Genre: Coming-of-age
- Written by: Yoon Kyung-ah
- Directed by: Shim Na-yeon
- Starring: Ong Seong-wu; Kim Hyang-gi; Shin Seung-ho; Kang Ki-young
- Country of origin: South Korea
- Original language: Korean
- No. of episodes: 16

Production
- Executive producer: Oh Hwan-min
- Producers: Park Jun-seo; Park Seong-hye
- Running time: 70 minutes
- Production companies: Drama House Studio; KeyEast

Original release
- Network: JTBC
- Release: July 22 – September 10, 2019

At Eighteen (Korean: 열여덟의 순간) is a 2019 South Korean television series directed by Shim Na-yeon starring Ong Seong-wu, Kim Hyang-gi, Shin Seung-ho, and Kang Ki-young. The series marks Ong's first official lead role. It aired on JTBC from July 22 to September 10, 2019.

== Synopsis ==
At Eighteen follows the story of eighteen-year-old Choi Joon-woo (Ong Seong-wu), whose teenage life has been molded by his meager family life and the conflicts he faced in school. Forced to transfer schools for a violation he did not commit, he arrives at Cheonbong High School where he has decided to be a nobody: a loner just quietly riding out 11th grade. Little does he know the twists and turns and the surprises in store for his eighteen-year-old life.

Soon, the loner inside Joon-woo has to come out of his comfort zone. Not only Joon-woo, but his fellow immature and inexperienced eighteen-year-olds, too, will have conflicts and whirlwinds of emotions and face the prejudices of a world shaped by the adults around them. Together, they have to live their lives to the max and make life-changing decisions. And most of all, they must not forget to cherish every moment of their lives. For all they know, the memories of their nineteenth year of life might be the sweetest, the most precious, and the most unforgettable.

== Cast ==
=== Main ===
- Ong Seong-wu as Choi Joon-woo
  - Jung Hyun-joon as child Choi Joon-woo

A student of Class 2-3 who has gotten used to being lonely and is not practiced in expressing his emotions. He is forced to transfer to Cheonbong High School for a violation he did not commit and is used to being solitary at school. Being a transferee, he is an object of ridicule and prejudice from his new classmates. But as he adapts to the new environment, he becomes closer with his classmates and earns the friendship of his crush, top student Soo-bin.

- Kim Hyang-gi as Yoo Soo-bin

A top student of Class 2-3 who has no clear goals and ambition as her life is controlled by her mother, who wants her to enroll in prestigious colleges in Seoul. Despite her opposition, she is forced to meet tutors and attend private classes and to strictly check her performance at school. She is among the few people in school who know of Joon-woo's real personality. She gradually starts to have feelings for Joon-woo.

- Shin Seung-ho as Ma Hwi-young

A top student of Class 2-3 from an affluent family who seems to be courageous and strong but is suffering from a complex. He is the president of their class and is known for acing every subject in school. Unknown to everyone, he is forced by his perfectionist and physically abusive father to be the best in everything. He also has the habit of scratching his wrist when in distress. Due to this negative family life, he tends to see his peers as subordinate to him, a personality discovered by Joon-woo and their homeroom teacher Mr. Oh.

- Kang Ki-young as Oh Han-kyeol

The homeroom teacher of Class 2-3. He is formerly an assistant homeroom teacher temporarily in charge of Class 2-3, whose official HT is hospitalized. After an incident at school, he asks the vice-principal for him to be promoted as the official HT of Class 2-3. He is a shopaholic and, as a teacher, is frequently nervous when dealing with challenges in the class.

=== Supporting ===
==== Students ====
- Lee Seung-min as Lee Ki-tae

Class 2-3 student; So-ye's boyfriend and a part of Hwi-young's clique. He keeps himself close to Hwi-young to gain his friendship and be included in private study groups, to the extent that most would see him as Hwi-young's servant.

- Moonbin as Jung Oh-je

Class 2-3 student; Joon-woo's seatmate and best friend. He is handsome, athletic, and likes to play basketball; he is Da-heen's crush. In his family, he would help his father out by either managing their tteokbokki shop or taking care of his baby brother. It is revealed in later episodes that he is gay; he harbored a secret crush on Hwi-young.

- Kim Do-wan as Cho Sang-hoon

Class 2-1 student. A natural genius, particularly in math, he sees Hwi-young as his rival in academics.

- Yoo In-soo as Yoo Pil-sang

Class 2-3 student. Rough on the outside, he has his own charms. He has a crush on Ro-mi.

- Baek Jae-woo as Go Dong

Class 2-3 student. He frequently accompanies Pil-sang.

- Woo Joon-seo as Park Kyu-nam

Class 2-3 student. He likes to play mobile games.
Class 2-3 student. He is also a part of Hwi-young's clique.

- Kim Ga-hee as Moon Chan-yeol

Class 2-3 student; one of Soo-bin's friends. Though boyish, she has a crush on their homeroom teacher Mr. Oh.

- Moon Joo-yeon as Yoon So-ye

Class 2-3 student; Ki-tae's girlfriend and one of Soo-bin's friends. She is a ballet dancer.

- Kim Bo-yoon as Kwon Da-heen

Class 2-3 student; one of Soo-bin's friends. She has a strong crush on Oh-je.

- Han Sung-min as Hwang Ro-mi

Class 2-3 student; one of Soo-bin's friends. She is jealous of Soo-bin being in the top tier. She has a crush on Joon-woo and would ignore Pil-sang's advances.

==== Parents ====
- Shim Yi-young as Lee Yeon-woo

Joon-woo's mother. A single young mother, she runs a restaurant but is in debt. She loves Joon-woo very much.

- Choi Jae-woong as Choi Myeong-joon

Joon-woo's father. He broke up with Yeon-woo when he found out he had accidentally bore her a child (Joon-woo). He has his own family now.

- Kim Sun-young as Yoon Song-hee

Soo-bin's mother. She forces Soo-bin to be top in class and prepare for going to an in-Seoul college. She is in bad terms with her husband Jong-soo, who has now a new woman.

- Lee Hae-young as Yoo Jong-soo

Soo-bin's father. He wants to be divorced with his wife, but he loves Soo-bin as his daughter.

- Jung Young-joo as Park Geum-ja

Hwi-young's mother. Spoiling her son and out of the fear of starting her husband's fury, she would use her wealth to manipulate Hwi-young's teachers.

- Sung Ki-yoon as Ma Yoon-gi

Hwi-young's father. Forcing his son to be top of his class, he puts both his wife and Hwi-young through emotional abuse.

==== Others ====
- Park Sung-geun as Lee Kwan-yong

Vice-principal of Cheonbong High School

- Heo Young-ji as Kim Ji-min

An employee at the convenience store where Joon-woo works part-time. She usually calls Joon-woo as "Park Young-bae" (the name written on the second-hand uniform Joon-woo is using at work). She is trying hard to find a better work. She is Mr. Oh's love interest.

- Choi Woo-sung as Im Gun-hyuk

Joon-woo's former schoolmate

- Choi Dae-hoon as Teacher Son

Mathematics lecturer

- Lee Seung-il as Joo Hyun-jang
- Jeon Jin-seo

=== Special appearances ===
- Song Geon-hee as Shin Jung-hoo (Ep. 3–4)

Joon-woo's childhood friend and former schoolmate

- Kang Hoon as Ma Hwi-young's older brother (Ep. 16)

== Original soundtrack ==
At Eighteen: Original Soundtrack

Soundtrack album by Various artists
- Recorded: 2019
- Genre: Soundtrack
- Languages: Korean; English
- Labels: Warner Music Korea; JTBC Contents Hub

At Eighteen: Original Soundtrack
No.	Title	Artist	Length
1.	"Moments"	Christopher	3:54
2.	"Our Story" (우리가 만난 이야기)	Ong Seong-wu	3:29
3.	"I'll Be With You" (네가 있으면 좋겠어)	Bily Acoustie	3:19
4.	"Dear My"	Stella Jang	3:33
5.	"Picturesque Days" (그림 같던 날들)	Jukjae	3:42
6.	"Floral Peach"	Minsu	3:00
7.	"At Eighteen Opening"	Ha Geun-young; Byun Dong-wook	1:15
8.	"Our Youth"	Ha Geun-young; Byun Dong-wook	2:45
9.	"First Love"	Ha Geun-young; Byun Dong-wook	1:55
10.	"Moving Forward"	Ha Geun-young; Byun Dong-wook	1:35
11.	"Are You Okay"	Ha Geun-young; Byun Dong-wook	1:32
12.	"Angry With Myself"	Ha Geun-young; Yoo Min-ji	2:00
13.	"Thinking of You"	Ha Geun-young; Yoo Min-ji	1:38
14.	"With My Friends"	Ha Geun-young; Byun Dong-wook	1:25
15.	"Running for Memories"	Ha Geun-young; Byun Dong-wook	1:32
16.	"My Dream Is"	Ha Geun-young; Byun Dong-wook	1:55
17.	"In Conflict"	Ha Geun-young; Yoo Min-ji	1:03
18.	"I Like You"	Ha Geun-young; Byun Dong-wook	1:14

At Eighteen: Original Soundtrack Parts 1–6

=== Part 1 ===
Released on July 29, 2019
No.	Title	Lyrics	Music	Artist	Length
1.	"Moments"	Ha Geun-young; Lee Soo-yeon; Christopher	Ha Geun-young; Byun Dong-wook	Christopher	3:54
2.	"Moments" (Inst.)		Ha Geun-young; Byun Dong-wook		3:53
Total length:					7:46

=== Part 2 ===
Released on August 5, 2019
No.	Title	Lyrics	Music	Artist	Length
1.	"Our Story" (우리가 만난 이야기)	Woo Ye-rin	Kim Je-hwi	Ong Seong-wu	3:29
2.	"Our Story" (Inst.)		Kim Je-hwi		3:29
Total length:					6:58

=== Part 3 ===
Released on August 12, 2019
No.	Title	Lyrics	Music	Artist	Length
1.	"I'll Be With You" (네가 있으면 좋겠어)	Ha Geun-young; Lee Soo-yeon	Ha Geun-young; Byun Dong-wook	Bily Acoustie	3:19
2.	"I'll Be With You" (Inst.)		Ha Geun-young; Byun Dong-wook		3:19
Total length:					6:38

=== Part 4 ===
Released on August 19, 2019
No.	Title	Lyrics	Music	Artist	Length
1.	"Dear My"	Ha Geun-young; Lee Soo-yeon	Ha Geun-young; Lee Soo-yeon	Stella Jang	3:33
2.	"Dear My" (Inst.)		Ha Geun-young; Lee Soo-yeon		3:33
Total length:					7:06

=== Part 5 ===
Released on August 26, 2019
No.	Title	Lyrics	Music	Artist	Length
1.	"Picturesque Days" (그림 같던 날들)	Ha Geun-young; Lee Soo-yeon	Ha Geun-young; Byun Dong-wook	Jukjae	3:42
2.	"Picturesque Days" (Inst.)		Ha Geun-young; Byun Dong-wook		3:42
Total length:					7:24

=== Part 6 ===
Released on September 2, 2019
No.	Title	Lyrics	Music	Artist	Length
1.	"Floral Peach"	Ha Geun-young; Lee Soo-yeon	Ha Geun-young; Byun Dong-wook; Lee Soo-yeon	Minsu	3:00
2.	"Floral Peach" (Inst.)		Ha Geun-young; Byun Dong-wook; Lee Soo-yeon		3:00
Total length:					6:00

== Viewership ==
At Eighteen : South Korea viewers per episode (thousands)

Season	Episode number																Average
Season	1	2	3	4	5	6	7	8	9	10	11	12	13	14	15	16	Average
1	702	566	751	816	833	947	829	941	826	825	956	881	870	927	869	834	836

Source: Audience measurement performed nationwide by Nielsen Korea.

Average TV viewership ratings
Ep.	Original broadcast date	Title	Average audience share (Nielsen Korea)	
Ep.	Original broadcast date	Title	Nationwide	Seoul
1	July 22, 2019	The Nameless Kid, Choi Joon-woo (이름없는 아이, 최준우)	3.009%	3.692%
2	July 23, 2019	A Moment I Want to Run Away (도망가고 싶은 순간)	2.354%	2.779%
3	July 29, 2019	It Always Rains on a Sad Day (속상한 날은 꼭 비가 내린다)	3.169%	3.747%
4	July 30, 2019	Happiness and Sadness Come and Go Instantly (기쁨과 슬픔은 한 순간)	3.393%	4.466%
5	August 5, 2019	After That Long and Sad Day (길고 슬픈 그날 밤이 지나면)	3.341%	3.710%
6	August 6, 2019	The Timing of Action and Reaction (액션과 리액션의 타이밍)	3.512%	4.260%
7	August 12, 2019	Romeo and Juliet (로미오와 줄리엣)	3.150%	3.545%
8	August 13, 2019	The Moment of Your First Love (첫 사랑의 순간)	3.560%	4.217%
9	August 19, 2019	I'm Sorry... (미안해...)	3.322%	3.927%
10	August 20, 2019	The Night That Will Never Return (다시 못 올 그날 밤)	3.416%	4.031%
11	August 26, 2019	The Emotions That I Got To Know Through You (너로 인해 알게 된 감정들)	3.766%	5.010%
12	August 27, 2019	Being More Mature Than Adults At The Age Of 18 (어른 보다 더 어른다운 열여덟)	3.508%	4.299%
13	September 2, 2019	I Should Still Like You (계속 좋아해야지 그래도)	3.498%	4.247%
14	September 3, 2019	Happy Birthday To You (Note: The original title is in English.)	3.808%	5.019%
15	September 9, 2019	Ways to Embrace Your Scar (상처를 안아주는 방법)	3.740%	4.585%
16	September 10, 2019	This Goodbye Isn't Forever (지금의 헤어짐이 영원하지 않음을)	3.882%	4.865%
Average			3.402%	4.150%
In the table above, the blue numbers represent the lowest ratings and the red numbers represent the highest ratings.; This series aired on a cable channel/pay TV which normally has a relatively smaller audience compared to free-to-air TV/public broadcasters (KBS, SBS, MBC and EBS).

== Awards and nominations ==
Year	Award	Category	Recipient	Result	Ref.
2019	12th Korea Drama Awards	Excellence Award, Actor	Kang Ki-young	Won	
2019	12th Korea Drama Awards	Best New Actor	Ong Seong-wu	Won	
2019	12th Korea Drama Awards	Hallyu Star Award	Ong Seong-wu	Won	
2020	56th Baeksang Arts Awards	Best New Actor (TV)	Ong Seong-wu	Nominated	
