= Kim Hyang-gi =

South Korean actress (born 2000)

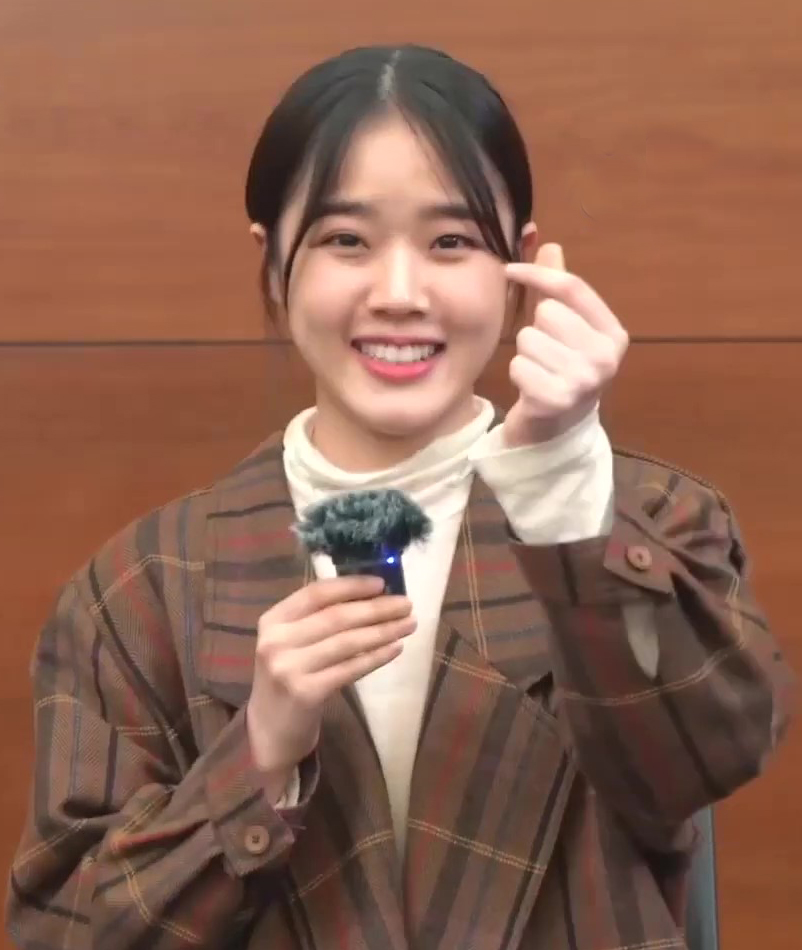
- Kim in 2022
- Born: August 9, 2000 (age 26); Yongin, South Korea
- Education: Hanyang University
- Occupation: Actress
- Years active: 2003–present
- Agent: Cree Company

Korean name
- Hangul: 김향기
- Hanja: 金香起
- RR: Gim Hyanggi
- MR: Kim Hyanggi

Kim Hyang-gi (Korean: 김향기; born August 9, 2000) is a South Korean actress. She debuted as a child actress and was best known for her role in the television series The Queen's Classroom (2013), as well as the films Along with the Gods: The Two Worlds (2017) and its 2018 sequel. Her portrayal of an autistic girl in Innocent Witness (2019) received critical acclaim.

== Career ==
Kim began her career as a child actress, debuting in a Paris Baguette commercial alongside her future co-star Jung Woo-sung and first appeared in the animal film Heart Is... in 2006 alongside Yoo Seung-ho. Thereafter she starred in melodrama film Cherry Tomato, which depicts the poverty-stricken life of an old man and his granddaughter. One of Kim's earlier notable roles were in the drama film Wedding Dress where she played Song Yoon-ah's daughter.

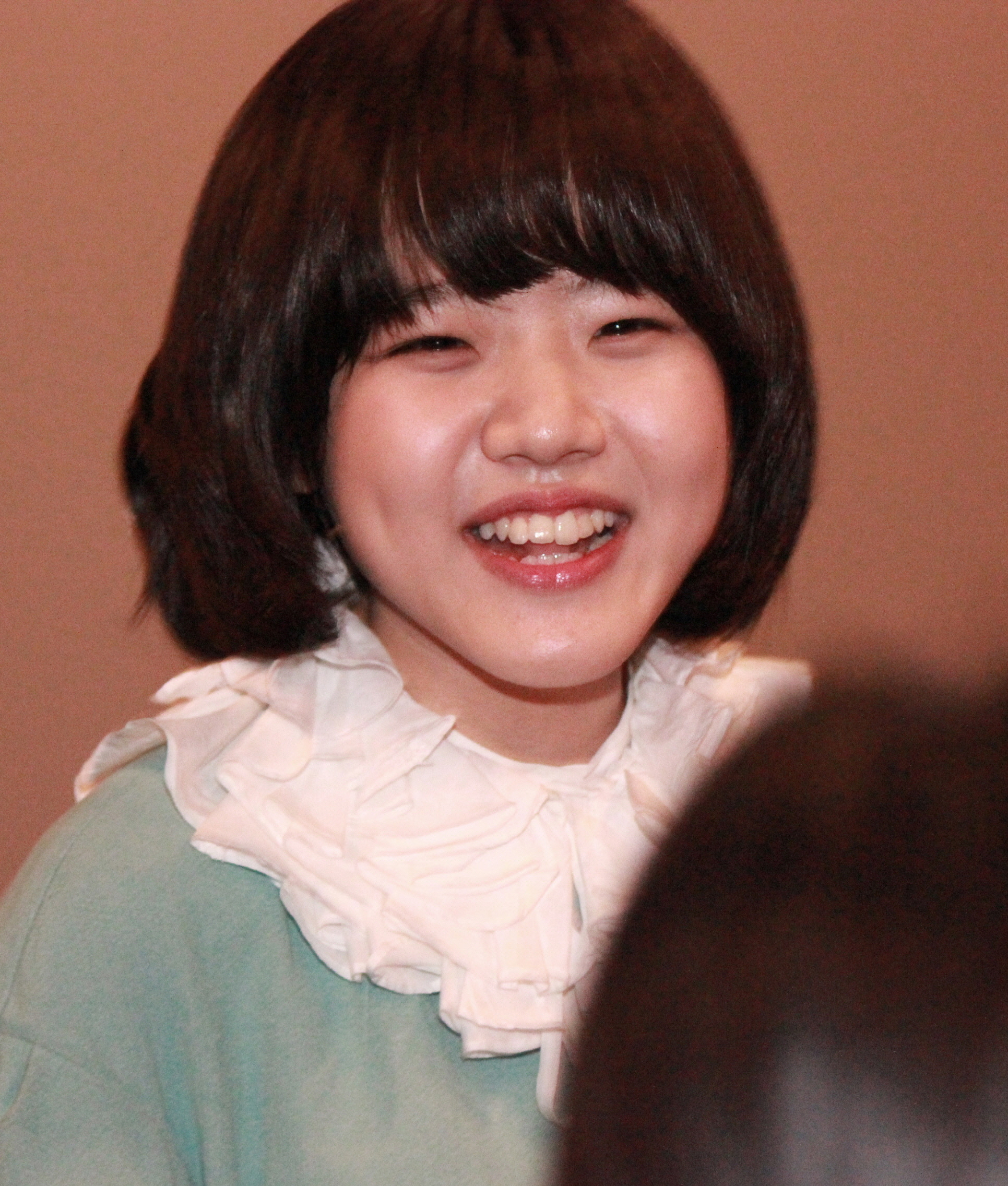
Kim in 2014

In 2013, Kim starred in the television drama The Queen's Classroom, which won her a Best Young Actress Award at the 2013 MBC Drama Awards. Kim next appeared in Thread of Lies, a film adaptation of Kim Ryeo-ryeong's novel Elegant Lies about a willful girl seeking the truth behind her sister's suicide. Her performance as a victim of bully won her the Best New Actress award at the Baeksang Arts Awards.

In 2015, Kim had a lead role in the Drama City television special, Snowy Road. The two-part drama series is about the "comfort women" in Korea under Japanese rule during World War II, and was later released as a film in theaters.

In 2017, Kim starred in the web drama Sweet Revenge, which earned positive reviews and had over 11 million views online. The same year, she starred in the fantasy blockbuster Along With the Gods: The Two Worlds. The film was the second highest-grossing film in South Korea, and Kim won the Best Supporting Actress award at the Blue Dragon Film Awards. Kim subsequently reprised her role in the sequel of the film, Along with the Gods: The Last 49 Days.

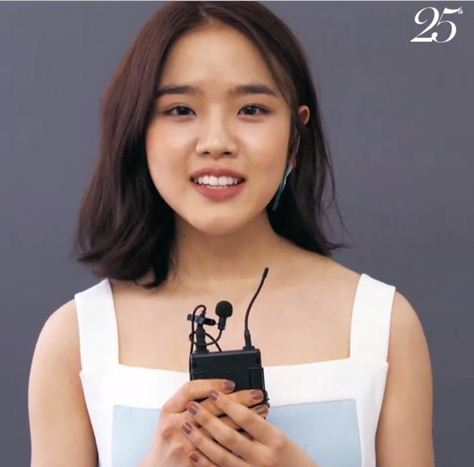
Kim in 2018

In 2018, Kim starred in the drama film Youngju, playing a lonely girl whose environment has forced her to grow up too fast. The same year, she was cast in the two-episode romance drama Drunk in Good Taste.

In 2019, Kim reunited with and starred alongside Jung Woo-sung in the drama film Innocent Witness. She earned positive reviews for her portrayal of a girl with a developmental disorder. She also appeared in the youth drama At Eighteen directed by Shim Na-yeon alongside Ong Seong-wu.

In 2022, Kim appeared in the period war action film Hansan: Rising Dragon, the second installment of Kim Han-min's Yi Sun-sin trilogy, in the role of Jeong Bo-reum, a spy who enters the enemy territory as a courtesan. The same year, she starred in the tvN historical-medical drama Poong, the Joseon Psychiatrist.

In 2025, Kim was cast as Viola De Lesseps in the play Shakespeare in Love.

== Filmography ==
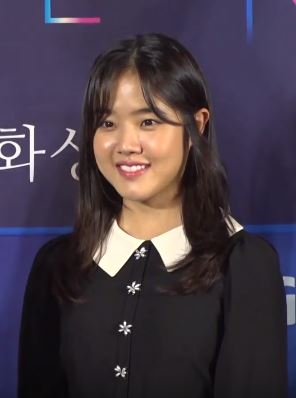
Kim at the 40th Blue Dragon Film Awards in 2019. Hand printing event for the 39th Blue Dragon Film Awards Winners.

=== Film ===
Year	Title	Role	Notes	Ref.
2006	Heart Is...	So-yi		
2008	Cherry Tomato	Da-seong		
2008	Girl Scout	Yoon-yi		
2008	Santamaria	Young Ho-kyung	Cameo	
2009	Private Eye	Byul-yi		
2010	Wedding Dress	Jang So-ra		
2010	Troubleshooter	Kang Soo-jin		
2011	Late Blossom	Street light kid	Cameo	
2012	The Grand Heist	Nan-yi		
2012	A Werewolf Boy	Sun-ja		
2014	Thread of Lies	Cheon-ji		
2016	A Letter from Prison	Kwon Dong-hyun		
2016	A Melody to Remember	Han Sun-mi	Cameo	
2017	Along With the Gods: The Two Worlds	Duk-choon		
2017	Snowy Road	Choi Jong-boon		
2018	Along with the Gods: The Last 49 Days	Duk-choon		
2018	Youngju	Young-ju		
2019	Innocent Witness	Ji-woo		
2021	I	Ah-young		
2021	Space Sweepers	Robot Bubs	Cameo	
2021	I Will Open the Door For You	Lee So-mi	Short film	
2022	Hansan: Rising Dragon	Jeong Bo-reum		
2024	Addiction: Only visible to me	Ji-min	Short film	
2024	Work to do	Jang Il-seob's daughter	Voice cameo	
2025	Hallan	Ko Ah-jin		
2026	Pilgrims	Sophie	Animation film	
TBA	It's Okay to Breathe Next to You	Hwa-ran		

=== Television series ===
Year	Title	Role	Notes	Ref.
2007	Salt Doll	Min Ha-na		
2007	Bad Couple	Jo Yeon-doo		
2007	Cruel Love	Lee Mi-so		
2008	Night After Night	Kang Ji-yoon		
2009	Hero	Jin Sol		
2011	Pluto Secret Society	Geum-sook		
2013	The Queen's Classroom	Shim Ha-na		
2014	KBS Drama Special – "You're Pretty, Oh Man-bok"	Oh Man-bok	one act-drama	
2015	Snowy Road	Choi Jong-boon	one act-drama	
2018	Drunk in Good Taste	Jung Choong-nam		
2019	At Eighteen	Yoo Soo-bin		
2022	Fly High Butterfly	Gi-Bbeum		
2022–2023	Poong, the Joseon Psychiatrist	Seo Eun-woo	Season 1–2	
2025	Cashero	Bang Eun-mi		
2025	KBS Drama Special – "Minji Minji Minji"	Kim Min-ji	one act-drama	
2026	Absolute Value of Romance	Yeo Ui-ju		

=== Web series ===
Year	Title	Role	Ref.
2017	Sweet Revenge	Ho Goo-hee	
2023	Secret Playlist	Song Han-joo	
2025	Can Ghosts Be Laundered?	Jung Se-jeong	

=== Music video appearances ===
Year	Song title	Artist	Ref.
2007	"Flying Girl"	Magolpy	
2011	"Love Is Delicious"	Wheesung	
2013	"Green Rain"	Shinee	
2014	"Back"	Infinite	
2020	"The Reason For My Spring"	Paul Kim	
2021	"JAJA"	Penomeco	

== Stage ==
=== Theater ===
Year	Play	Notes	Ref.
2025	Shakespeare in Love	Viola De Lesseps	

== Discography ==
=== Soundtrack appearances ===
Title	Year	Album
"So-ra's Song" (소라의 노래)	2010	Wedding Dress OST

== Accolades ==
=== Awards and nominations ===
Name of the award ceremony, year presented, category, nominee of the award, and the result of the nomination
Award ceremony	Year	Category	Nominee / Work	Result	Ref.
APAN Star Awards	2013	Best Young Actress	The Queen's Classroom	Won	
Baeksang Arts Awards	2014	Best New Actress – Film	Thread of Lies	Won	
Baeksang Arts Awards	2019	Best Actress – Film	Innocent Witness	Nominated	
Blue Dragon Film Awards	2018	Best Supporting Actress	Along with the Gods: The Two Worlds	Won	
Blue Dragon Film Awards	2018	Popular Star Award	Along with the Gods: The Two Worlds	Won	
Buil Film Awards	2014	Best New Actress	Thread of Lies	Nominated	
Buil Film Awards	2018	Popular Star Award	Along with the Gods: The Two Worlds	Won	
Buil Film Awards	2019	Best Actress	Innocent Witness	Nominated	
Chunsa Film Art Awards	2018	Best Supporting Actress	Along with the Gods: The Two Worlds	Nominated	
Chunsa Film Art Awards	2022	Best Supporting Actress	Hansan: Rising Dragon	Nominated	
Golden Cinema Film Festival	2019	Best Actress	Innocent Witness	Won	
Golden Cinema Film Festival	2022	Popularity Award chosen by cinematographer	Hansan: Rising Dragon	Won	
Grand Bell Awards	2014	Best New Actress	Thread of Lies	Nominated	
Grand Bell Awards	2020	Best Actress	Innocent Witness	Nominated	
Grand Bell Awards	2022	Best Supporting Actress	Hansan: Rising Dragon	Nominated	
KBS Drama Awards	2015	Best Young Actress	Snowy Road	Won	
Korean Association of Film Critics Awards	2019	Best Actress	Innocent Witness	Won	
Korean Culture and Entertainment Awards	2019	Best Actress	Innocent Witness	Won	
Korea Youth Film Festival	2018	Favorite Young Actress	Along with the Gods: The Two Worlds and Along with the Gods: The Last 49 Days	Won	
Korea Youth Film Festival	2019	Favorite Actress	Along with the Gods: The Last 49 Days, Innocent Witness, and Youngju	Won	
MBC Drama Awards	2013	Best Young Actress (Note: Award shared with Kim Sae-ron, Seo Shin-ae and Lee Young-yoo.)	The Queen's Classroom	Won	
SBS Drama Awards	2007	Best Young Actress	Bad Couple	Nominated	
Seoul International Youth Film Festival	2014	Best Young Actress	The Queen's Classroom and Thread of Lies	Won	
Wildflower Film Awards	2026	Best Actress	Hallan	Nominated	

=== Listicles ===
Name of publisher, year listed, name of listicle, and placement
Publisher	Year	Listicle	Placement	Ref.
Korean Film Council	2021	Korean Actors 200 (Note: Introduces 200 actors that best represent the present and future of Korean cinema to the people in the film industry all over the world.)	Included	
The Screen	2019	2009–2019 Top Box Office Powerhouse Actors in Korean Movies	18th	
