= Chunsa Film Art Awards 2020 =

25th edition of award ceremony

25th Chunsa International Film Festival
- Awarded for: Excellence in cinematic achievements
- Awarded by: Korean Film Directors Association
- Announced on: March 9, 2020
- Presented on: June 19, 2020
- Official website: Chunsa Film Art Awards

Highlights
- Best Direction: Won Shin-yun; The Battle: Roar to Victory
- Best Actor: Lee Byung-hun; The Man Standing Next
- Best Actress: Lee Young-ae; Bring Me Home
- Most awards: 2 — Kim Ji-young: Born 1982, The Man Standing Next, and The Battle: Roar to Victory
- Most nominations: 6 — Exit

The Chunsa Film Art Awards (also known as the Icheon Chunsa Film Festival) have been presented in South Korea since the founding of the prize by the Korea Film Directors' Society in 1990.

== Winners and nominees ==
The nominees for the 25th Chunsa Film Art Awards were announced on 9 March 2020.

Best Director	Best Screenplay
Won Shin-yun – The Battle: Roar to Victory; Woo Min-ho – The Man Standing Next; Chung Ji-young – Black Money; Jung Ji-woo – Tune in for Love; Lim Dae-hyung – Moonlit Winter; Hur Jin-ho – Forbidden Dream	Lee Sang-geun – Exit; Kim Bora – House of Hummingbird; Yoon Ga-eun – The House of Us; Lim Dae-hyung – Moonlit Winter; Jung Bum-sik, Lee Ji-min – Forbidden Dream
Best Actor	Best Actress
Lee Byung-hun – The Man Standing Next as Kim Gyu-pyeong; Song Kang-ho – The King's Letters as King Sejong; Yoo Hae-jin – The Battle: Roar to Victory as Hwang Hae-cheol; Jo Jung-suk – Exit as Yong-nam; Han Suk-kyu – Forbidden Dream as King Sejong	Lee Young-ae – Bring Me Home as Jung-yeon; Lim Yoona – Exit as Eui-joo; Kim Go-eun – Tune in for Love as Mi-soo; Kim Hee-ae – Moonlit Winter as Yoon-hee; Jung Yu-mi – Kim Ji-young: Born 1982 as Kim Ji-young
Best Supporting Actor	Best Supporting Actress
Lee Sung-min – The Man Standing Next as President Park; Kang Ki-young – Crazy Romance as Byung-chul; Lee Hee-joon – The Man Standing Next as Kwak Sang-cheon; Shin Goo – Forbidden Dream as Hwang Hui; Woo Hyun – Tazza: One Eyed Jack as Mool	Kim Mi-kyung – Kim Ji-young: Born 1982 as Mi-sook; Kim So-jin – The Man Standing Next as Debra Shim; Kim Sae-byuk – House of Hummingbird as Yong-ji; Go Doo-shim – Exit as Hyeon-ok; Kim Gook-hee – Tune in for Love as Eun-ja
Best New Actor	Best New Actress
Park Hae-soo – By Quantum Physics: A Nightlife Venture as Lee Chan-woo; Teo Yoo – Vertigo as Lee Jin-soo; Woo Do-hwan – The Divine Fury as Ji-shin; Kim Sung-cheol – The Battle of Jangsari as Ki Ha-Ryun; Jung Hae-in – Tune in for Love as Hyun-woo	Choi Sung-eun – Start-Up as Kyung-joo; Won Jin-ah – Long Live the King as Kang So-hyun; Jo Yi-hyun – Metamorphosis as Hyun-Joo; Park Ji-hu – House of Hummingbird as Eun-hee; Kim Na-yeon – The House of Us as Ha-na; Kim So-hye – Moonlit Winter as Sae-bom
Best New Director	Technical Award
Kim Do-young – Kim Ji-young: Born 1982; Kim Seung-woo – Bring Me Home; Yi Ok-Seop – Maggie; Kim Bora – House of Hummingbird; Han Ka-ram – Our Body; Lee Sang-geun – Exit	Kim Young-ho (Cinematography) – The Battle: Roar to Victory; Dexter Studios (Special effects) – Ashfall; Kang Gook-hyun (Cinematography) – House of Hummingbird; Kim Il-hyun (Cinematography) – Exit; Jo Hwa-seong (Production design) – Forbidden Dream

=== Films with multiple wins ===
The following films received multiple wins:

Wins	Films
2	Kim Ji-young: Born 1982
2	The Man Standing Next
2	The Battle: Roar to Victory

=== Films with multiple nominations ===
The following films received multiple nominations:

Nominations	Films
6	Exit
5	The Man Standing Next
5	Forbidden Dream
5	House of Hummingbird
4	Moonlit Winter
4	Tune in for Love
3	Kim Ji-young: Born 1982
3	The Battle: Roar to Victory
2	Bring Me Home
2	The House of Us

== See also ==
- 56th Grand Bell Awards
- 56th Baeksang Arts Awards
- 40th Blue Dragon Film Awards
- 28th Buil Film Awards
