= 29th Buil Film Awards =

2020 edition of award ceremony

- Date: October 22, 2020
- Site: Busan Exhibition and Convention Center, Haeundae-gu, Busan
- Official website: 2020 Buil Film Awards

Highlights
- Best Film: House of Hummingbird
- Best Direction: Jung Ji-woo; Tune in for Love
- Best Actor: Lee Byung-hun; The Man Standing Next
- Best Actress: Jung Yu-mi; Kim Ji-young: Born 1982

The 29th Buil Film Awards (Korean: 제29회 부일영화상) ceremony was hosted by the Busan-based daily newspaper Busan Ilbo. It was held on October 22, 2020 at the Busan Exhibition and Convention Center in Busan. It did not invite an audience to prevent the spread of COVID-19.

== Awards and nominations ==
Complete list of nominees and winners:

(Winners denoted in bold)

| Best Film | Best Director |
|---|---|
| **House of Hummingbird**; The Man Standing Next; Tune in for Love; Moonlit Winter; Lucky Chan-sil | **Jung Ji-woo** – **Tune in for Love**; Kim Do-young – Kim Ji-young: Born 1982; Woo Min-ho – The Man Standing Next; Kim Bora – House of Hummingbird; Lim Dae-hyung – Moonlit Winter |
| Best Actor | Best Actress |
| **Lee Byung-hun** – **The Man Standing Next** as **Kim Gyu-pyeong**; Lee Jung-jae – Deliver Us from Evil as Ray; Hwang Jung-min – Deliver Us from Evil as Kim In-nam; Jung Woo-sung – Beasts Clawing at Straws as Tae-young; Han Suk-kyu – Forbidden Dream as King Sejong | **Jung Yu-mi** – **Kim Ji-young: Born 1982** as **Kim Ji-young**; Lee Young-ae – Bring Me Home as Jung-yeon; Lee Joo-young – Baseball Girl as Joo Soo-in; Kim Hee-ae – Moonlit Winter as Yoon-hee; Jeon Do-yeon – Beasts Clawing at Straws as Yeon-hee |
| Best Supporting Actor | Best Supporting Actress |
| **Lee Hee-joon** – **The Man Standing Next** as **Kwak Sang-cheo**; Shin Jung-geun – Steel Rain 2: Summit as Second in Command; Park Jung-min – Deliver Us from Evil as; Koo Kyo-hwan – Peninsula as Captain Seo; Kim Young-min – Lucky Chan-sil as Jang Gook-young | **Lee Re** – **Peninsula** as **Jooni**; Kim So-jin – The Man Standing Next as Debra Shim; Jeon So-nee – Ghost Walk as Yoo Hyo-yeon; Kim Sae-byuk – House of Hummingbird as Yong-ji; Youn Yuh-jung – Lucky Chan-sil as Grandmother |
| Best New Actor | Best New Actress |
| **Kim Dae-geon** – **Clean Up** as Min-goo; Hong Kyung – Innocence as Jung-soo; Park Hae-soo – By Quantum Physics: A Nightlife Venture as Lee Chan-woo; Jung Hae-in – Tune in for Love as Hyun-woo; Kwak Jin-moo – Tiny Light as Kwak Jin-moo | **Kang Mal-geum** – **Lucky Chan-sil** as Chan-sil; Kim Ah-song – Bori as Bori; Park Ji-hu – House of Hummingbird as Eun-hee; Choi Sung-eun – Start-Up as Kyung-joo; Kim So-hye – Moonlit Winter as Sae-bom |

| Award | Recipient | Film |
|---|---|---|
| Yu Hyun-mok Film Arts Award | Cinema Dal founder Kim Il Kwon | —N/a |
| Best Screenplay | Kim Bo-ra | House of Hummingbird |
| Best Cinematography | Hong Kyung-pyo | Deliver Us from Evil |
| Best Music | Yeon Ri-mok | Tune in for Love |
| Best Art Direction | Lee Geon-moon | Deliver Us from Evil |
| Best New Director | Jo Min-jae | Tiny Light |
| Popular Star Award (Male) | Kang Dong-won | Peninsula |
| Popular Star Award (Female) | Seo Yea-ji | By Quantum Physics: A Nightlife Venture |
