= 56th Grand Bell Awards =

2020 edition of award ceremony

- Official poster
- Date: June 3, 2020
- Site: Grand Walkerhill Seoul, Seoul, South Korea
- Hosted by: Han Hye-jin; Lee Hwi-jae

Highlights
- Best Film: Parasite
- Best Director: Bong Joon-ho
- Best Actor: Lee Byung-hun
- Best Actress: Jung Yu-mi
- Most awards: Parasite (5)
- Most nominations: Parasite (11)

Television coverage
- Network: MBN

The 56th Grand Bell Awards (Korean: 대종상 영화제; RR: Daejongsang Yeonghwajae), also known as Daejong Film Awards, is determined and presented annually by The Motion Pictures Association of Korea for excellence in film in South Korea. The Grand Bell Awards were first presented in 1962 and have gained prestige as the Korean equivalent of the American Academy Awards. The ceremony was originally scheduled to be held on February 25, 2020, but was postponed due to the COVID-19 pandemic. The ceremony was held on June 3, 2020.

== Juries ==
- Lee Jang-ho, Film director (Jury President)
- Kwak Young-jin, Film criticism
- Kim Min-oh, Art director
- Kim Byung-in, Korea Scenario Writers Association
- Kim Chung-kang, Professor of Theater and Film (Hanyang University)
- Kim Hyo-jeong, Film criticism
- Mo Eun-young, Programmer (Bucheon International Fantastic Film Festival)
- Seong Seung-Taek, Cinematographer
- Lee Chang-se, Department of Media and Image Production (Far East University)

== Winners and nominees ==
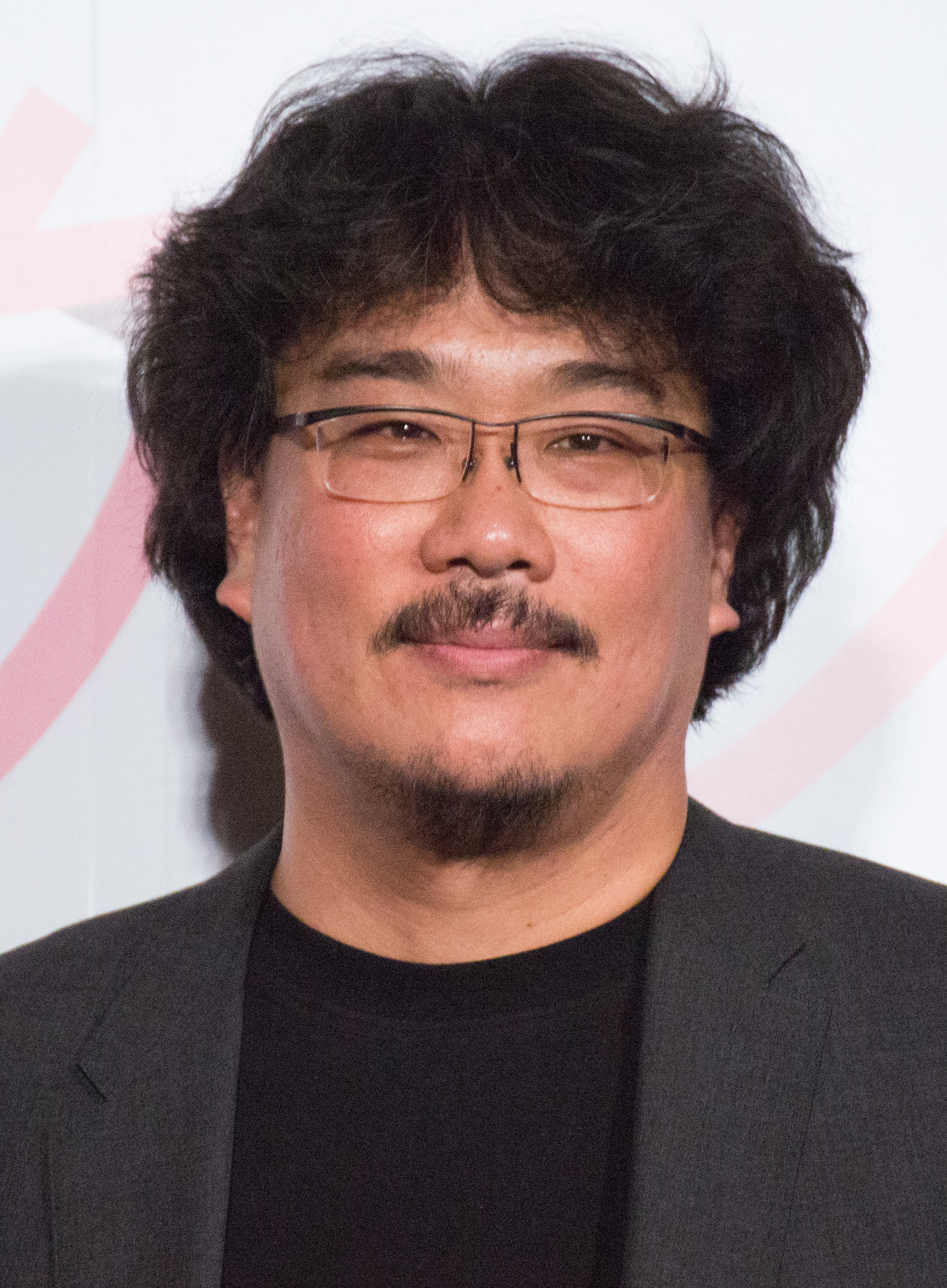
Bong Joon-ho, Best Director

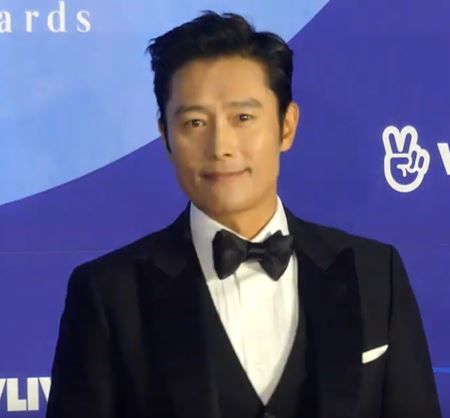
Lee Byung-hun, Best Actor

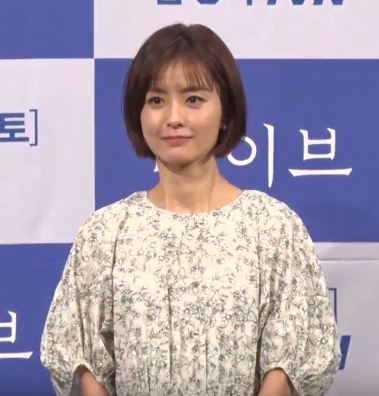
Jung Yu-mi, Best Actress

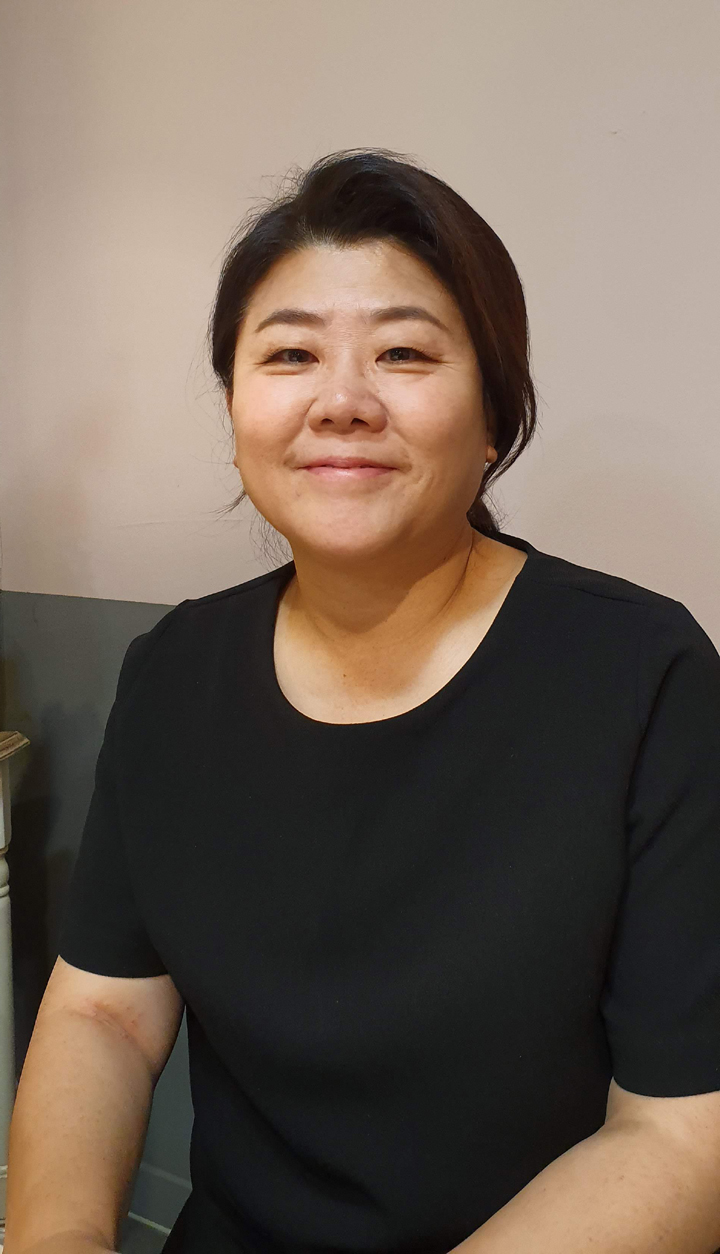
Lee Jung-eun, Best Supporting Actress

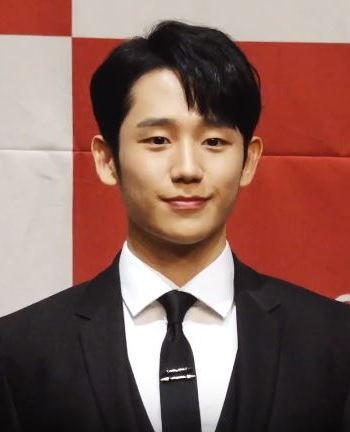
Jung Hae-in, Best New Actor

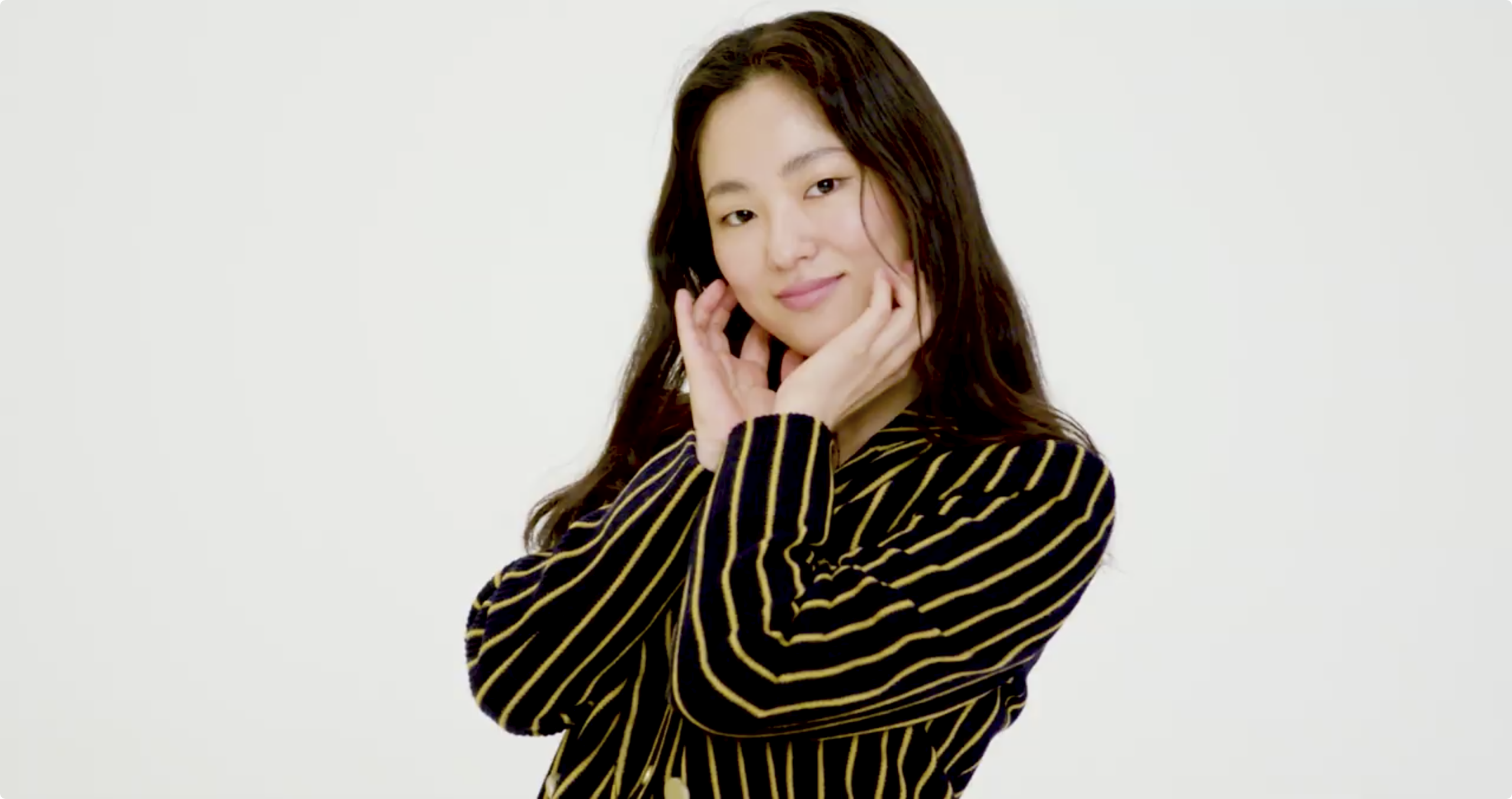
Jeon Yeo-been, Best New Actress

The nominees for the 56th Grand Bell Awards were announced on 17 January 2020.

=== Awards ===
Winners are listed first, highlighted in boldface, and indicated with a double dagger (‡).

| **Best Film** | **Best Director** |
| **Parasite**‡; Extreme Job; House of Hummingbird; Innocent Witness; Forbidden Dream | **Bong Joon-ho – Parasite**‡; Kim Bora – House of Hummingbird; Lee Byeong-heon – Extreme Job; Jang Jae-hyun – Svaha: The Sixth Finger; Chung Ji-young – Black Money |
| **Best Actor** | **Best Actress** |
| **Lee Byung-hun – Ashfall as Lee Joon-pyeong**‡; Sul Kyung-gu – Birthday as Jung Jung-il; Song Kang-ho – Parasite as Kim Ki-taek; Jung Woo-sung – Innocent Witness as Yang Soon-ho; Han Suk-kyu – Forbidden Dream as King Sejong | **Jung Yu-mi – Kim Ji-young: Born 1982 as Kim Ji-young**‡; Kim Hyang-gi – Innocent Witness as Yim Ji-woo; Kim Hee-ae – Moonlit Winter as Yoon-hee; Jeon Do-yeon – Birthday as Park Soon-nam; Han Ji-min – Miss Baek as Baek Sang-ah |
| **Best Supporting Actor** | **Best Supporting Actress** |
| **Jin Seon-kyu – Extreme Job as Ma Bong-pal**‡; Kim Sung-kyu – The Gangster, The Cop, The Devil as Kang Kyung-ho; Kang Ki-young – Crazy Romance as Byung-chul; Park Myung-hoon – Parasite as Oh Geun-sae; Shin Goo – Forbidden Dream as Hwang Hui | **Lee Jung-eun – Parasite as Gook Moon-gwang**‡; Kim Sae-byuk – House of Hummingbird as Kim Young-ji; Kim So-jin – Another Child as Kim Mi-hee; Yeom Hye-ran – Innocent Witness as Oh Mi-ran; Lee Hanee – Extreme Job as Jang Yeon-su |
| **Best New Actor** | **Best New Actress** |
| **Jung Hae-in – Tune in for Love as Hyun-woo**‡; Gong Myung – Extreme Job as Kim Jae-hoon; Park Hae-soo – By Quantum Physics: A Nightlife Venture as Lee Chan-woo; Ahn Ji-ho – A Boy and Sungreen as Lee Bo-hee; Jang Dong-yoon – Beautiful Days as Zhen Chen | **Jeon Yeo-been – After My Death as Young-hee**‡; Park Ji-hu – House of Hummingbird as Kim Eun-hee; Park Se-jin – Another Child as Kim Yoon-ah; Lee Jae-in – Svaha: The Sixth Finger as Lee Geum-hwa; Jung Da-eun – Second Life as Sun-hee / Seul-ki |
| **Best New Director** | **Best Screenplay** |
| **Kim Bora – House of Hummingbird**‡; Kim Do-young – Kim Ji-young: Born 1982; Kim Yoon-seok – Another Child; Kim Ui-seok – After My Death; Lee Sang-geun – Exit | **Bong Joon-ho, Han Jin-won – Parasite**‡; Kim Bora – House of Hummingbird; Moon Ji-won – Innocent Witness; Bae Se-young – Extreme Job; Jang Jae-hyun – Svaha: The Sixth Finger |
| **Best Cinematography** | **Best Film Editing** |
| **Kim Young-ho – The Battle: Roar to Victory**‡; Hong Kyung-pyo – Parasite; Kang Kook-hyun – House of Hummingbird; Kim Dong-young – The Divine Move 2: The Wrathful; Lee Tae-yoon – Innocent Witness | **Lee Gang-hui – Exit**‡; Nam Na-yeong – Extreme Job; Yang Jin-mo – Parasite; Jeong Byeong-jin – Svaha: The Sixth Finger; Kim Sun-min – Dark Figure of Crime |
| **Best Art Direction** | **Best Lighting** |
| **Seo Seong-gyeong – Svaha: The Sixth Finger**‡; Lee Ha-jun – Parasite; Ryu Seong-hui – The King's Letters; Jang Hee-sun – Swing Kids; Cho Hwa-sung – Forbidden Dream | **Jeon Young-seok – Svaha: The Sixth Finger**‡; Kim Chang-ho – Parasite; Cho Kyu-young – Ashfall; Hwang Sun-ok – The Battle: Roar to Victory; Lee Seung-hwan – Forbidden Dream |
| **Best Costume Design** | **Best Music** |
| **Lee Jin-hee – The Great Battle**‡; Sim Hyeon-seob – The King's Letter; Kwon Yujin – Swing Kids; Cho Sang-kyung – Forbidden Dream; Cho Sang-kyung – A Resistance | **Jung Jae-il – Parasite**‡; Bang Jun-seok – Ashfall; Matija Strniša – House of Hummingbird; Kim Tae-seong – Svaha: The Sixth Finger; Kim Jun-seok – Swing Kids |
| **Technical Award** | **Best Planning** |
| **Andras Ikladi (Visual Effects) – Ashfall**‡; Jung Do-ahn (Special Effects) – The Battle: Roar to Victory; Son Seung-hyeon, Kim Shin-cheol (Visual Effects) – Svaha: The Sixth Finger; Jin Yul-yun (Stunts) – Exit; Jung Do-ahn (Visual Effects) – Exit | **Lee Jong-suk – Extreme Job**‡; Yoon Seo-young – Mal-Mo-E: The Secret Mission; Kim Soon-mo – Birthday; Baek Hyeon-ik – Exit; Mo Il-young – Kim Ji-young: Born 1982 |

== Films that received multiple awards and nominations ==
The following films received multiple wins:

Films with multiple nominations
| Nominations | Films |
|---|---|
| 11 | Parasite |
| 8 | Extreme Job |
| 8 | House of Hummingbird |
| 8 | Svaha: The Sixth Finger |
| 6 | Innocent Witness |
| 6 | Forbidden Dream |
| 4 | Ashfall |
| 4 | Exit |
| 3 | Another Child |
| 3 | Birthday |
| 3 | Kim Ji-young: Born 1982 |
| 3 | The Battle: Roar to Victory |
| 3 | Swing Kids |
| 2 | After My Death |

Films with multiple awards
| Wins | Films |
|---|---|
| 5 | Parasite |
| 2 | Ashfall |
| 2 | Extreme Job |
| 2 | Svaha: The Sixth Finger |

== See also ==
- 56th Baeksang Arts Awards
- 40th Blue Dragon Film Awards
- 28th Buil Film Awards
