= 40th Blue Dragon Film Awards =

2019 edition of award ceremony

- Date: November 21, 2019
- Site: Paradise City, Incheon
- Hosted by: Kim Hye-soo; Yoo Yeon-seok

Highlights
- Best Film: Parasite
- Most awards: Parasite (5)
- Most nominations: Parasite (11)

Television coverage
- Network: SBS
- Duration: 120 minutes

The 40th Blue Dragon Film Awards (Korean: 제40회 청룡영화상) ceremony was held on November 21, 2019, at Paradise City, Incheon. Organized by Sports Chosun (a sister brand of Chosun Ilbo), the annual award show honored the best in Korean language films that were released from October 12, 2018 to October 10, 2019. It was broadcast live on SBS.

== Nominations and winners ==
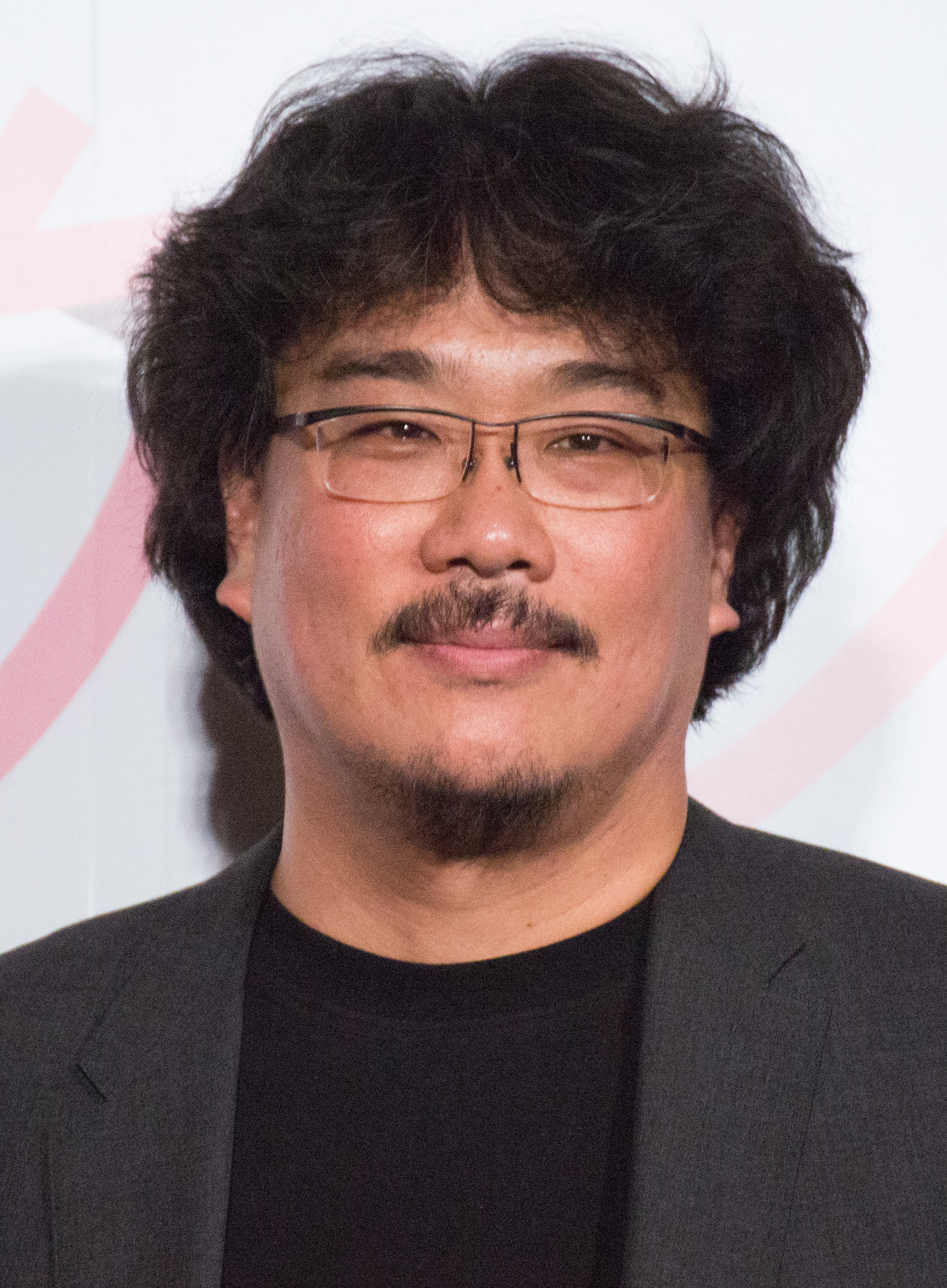
Bong Joon-ho, Best Film co-winner, Best Director winner

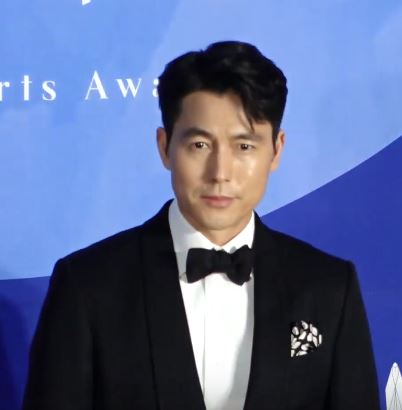
Jung Woo-sung, Best Actor winner

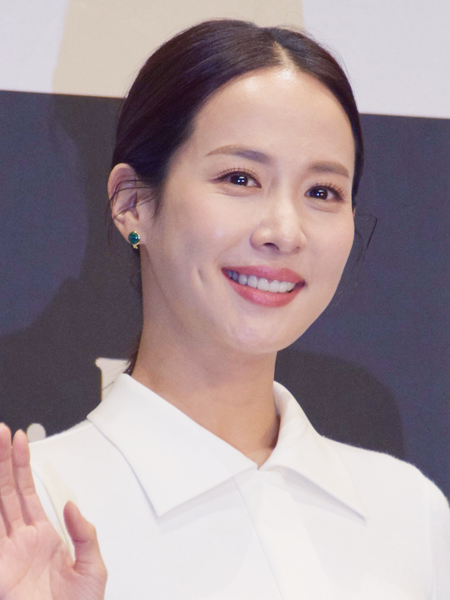
Cho Yeo-jeong, Best Actress winner

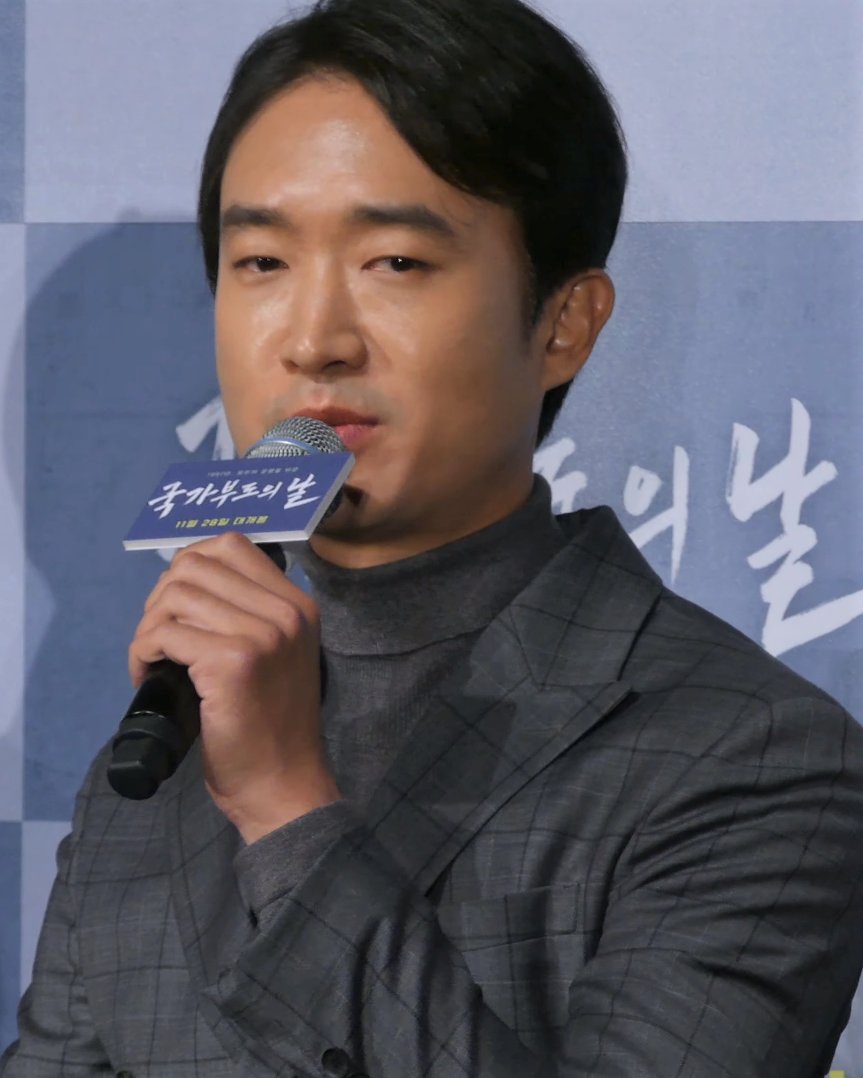
Jo Woo-jin, Best Supporting Actor winner

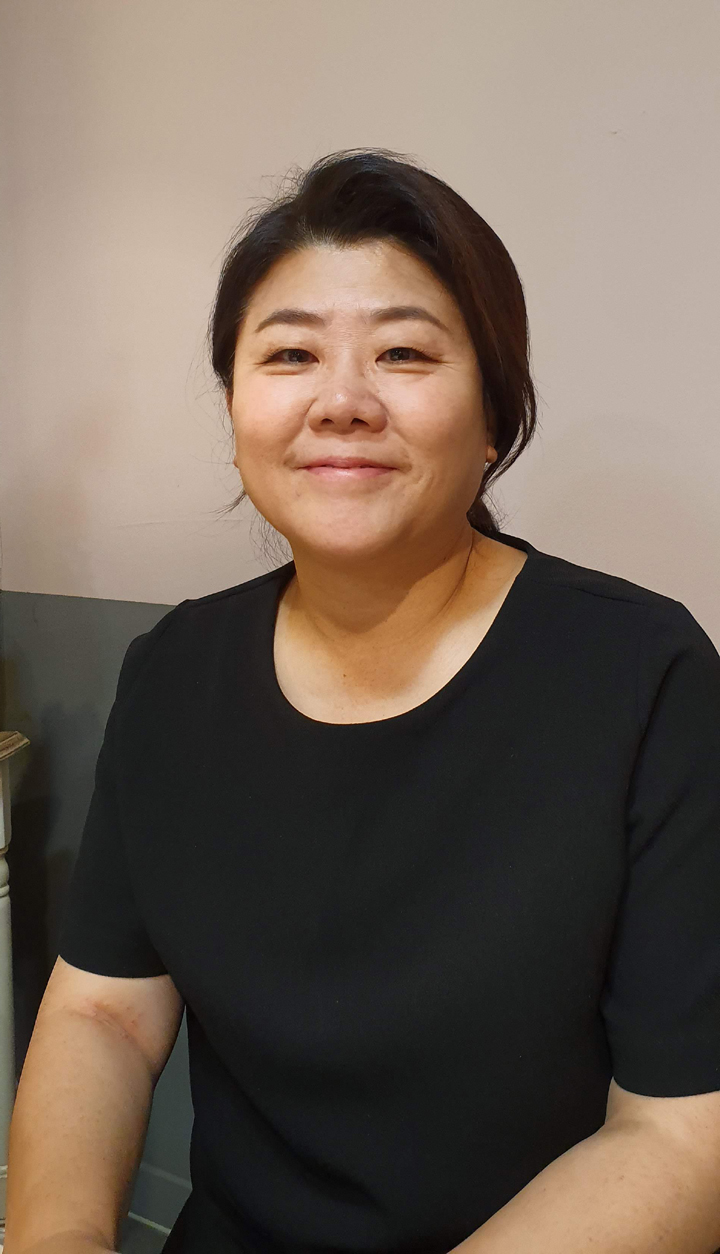
Lee Jung-eun, Best Supporting Actress winner

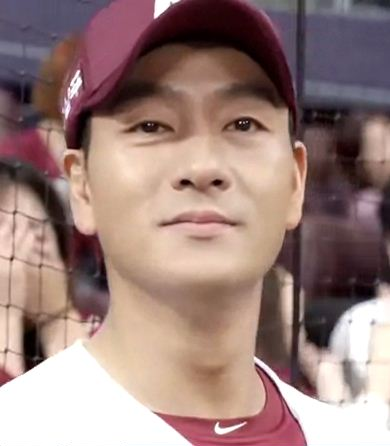
Park Hae-soo, Best New Actor winner

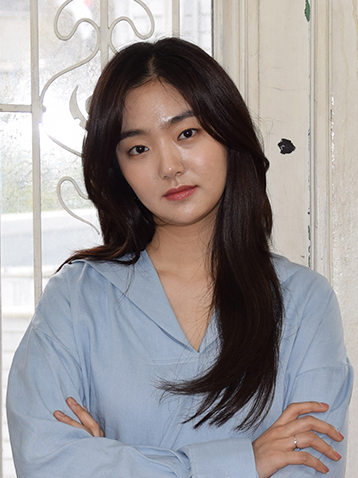
Kim Hye-jun, Best New Actress winner

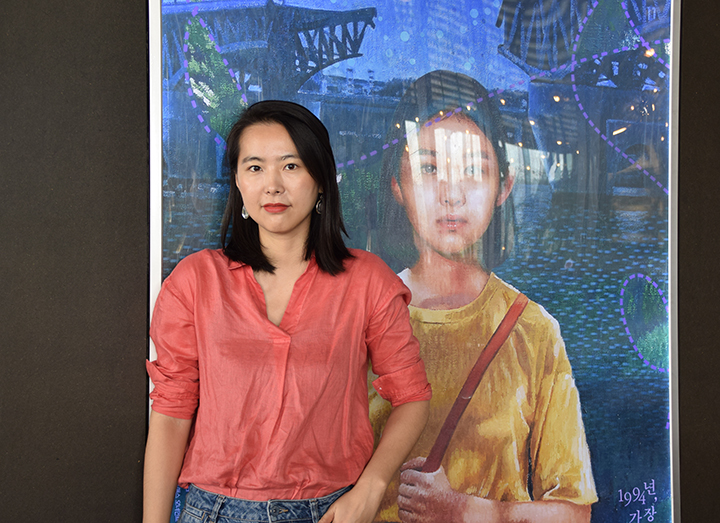
Kim Bora, Best Screenplay winner

Winners are listed first, highlighted in boldface, and indicated with a double dagger (‡).

=== Main awards ===
**Best Film**	**Best Director**
**Parasite**‡; Extreme Job; House of Hummingbird; Swing Kids; Exit	**Bong Joon-ho - Parasite**‡; Kang Hyeong-cheol - Swing Kids; Won Shin-yun - The Battle: Roar to Victory; Lee Byeong-heon - Extreme Job; Jang Jae-hyun - Svaha: The Sixth Finger
**Best Leading Actor**	**Best Leading Actress**
**Jung Woo-sung - Innocent Witness as Yang Soon-ho**‡; Ryu Seung-ryong - Extreme Job as Go Sang-ki; Sul Kyung-gu - Birthday as Jung Jung-il; Song Kang-ho - Parasite as Kim Ki-taek; Jo Jung-suk - Exit as Lee Yong-nam	**Cho Yeo-jeong - Parasite as Choi Yeon-gyo**‡; Go Ah-sung - A Resistance as Yu Gwan-sun; Kim Hye-soo - Default as Han Shi-hyeon; Lim Yoona - Exit as Jung Eui-joo; Jeon Do-yeon - Birthday as Park Soon-nam
**Best Supporting Actor**	**Best Supporting Actress**
**Jo Woo-jin - Default as Park Dae-young**‡; Kang Ki-young - The Most Ordinary Romance as Byung-chul; Park Myung-hoon - Parasite as Oh Geun-sae; Lee Kwang-soo - Inseparable Bros as Park Dong-goo; Jin Seon-kyu - Extreme Job as Ma Bong-pal	**Lee Jung-eun - Parasite as Gook Moon-gwang**‡; Kim Sae-byuk - House of Hummingbird as Kim Young-ji; Park So-dam - Parasite as Kim Ki-jeong; Lee Hanee - Extreme Job as Jang Yeon-soo; Jang Young-nam - Metamorphosis as Choi Myung-joo
**Best New Actor**	**Best New Actress**
**Park Hae-soo - By Quantum Physics: A Nightlife Venture as Lee Chan-woo**‡; Gong Myung - Extreme Job as Kim Jae-hoon; Kim Sung-cheol - The Battle of Jangsari as Ki Ha-Ryun; Park Hyung-sik - Juror 8 as Kwon Nam-woo; Jung Hae-in - Tune in for Love as Hyun-woo	**Kim Hye-jun - Another Child as Kwon Joo-ri**‡; Park Ji-hu - House of Hummingbird as Kim Eun-hee; Park Hye-su - Swing Kids as Yang Pal-lae; Lee Jae-in - Svaha: The Sixth Finger as Lee Geum-hwa; Choi Soo-young – Miss & Mrs. Cops as Yang Jang-mi
**Best New Director**	**Best Screenplay**
**Lee Sang-geun - Exit**‡; Kim Bora - House of Hummingbird; Kim Yoon-seok – Another Child; Lee Ok Seob - Maggie; Lee Jong-eon - Birthday	**Kim Bora - House of Hummingbird** ‡; Eom Seong-min - Default; Bae Se-young - Extreme Job; Bong Joon-ho, Han Jin-won - Parasite; Jang Jae-hyun - Svaha: The Sixth Finger
**Best Cinematography and Lighting**	**Best Editing**
**Kim Ji-yong, Jo Gyu-young - Swing Kids**‡; Hong Kyung-pyo, Kim Chang-ho - Parasite; Kim Yeong-ho, Hwang Sun-ok - The Battle: Roar to Victory; Kim Tae-su - Svaha: The Sixth Finger; Kim Il-yeon (C.G.K), Kim Min-jae - Exit	**Nam Na-yeong - Swing Kids**‡; Nam Na-yeong - Extreme Job; Yang Jin-mo - Parasite; Yang Jin-mo - The Battle: Roar to Victory; Lee Gang-hui - Exit
**Best Art Direction**	**Technical Award**
**Lee Ha-joon - Parasite**‡; Lee Jong-gun - The Battle: Roar to Victory; Seo Seong-gyeong - Svaha: The Sixth Finger; Park Il-hyun - Swing Kids; Bae Jun-su - Tune in for Love	**Yun Jin-yul, Kwon Ji-hun (Stunts) - Exit**‡; Kim Jin-sook (Make-up) - Metamorphosis; Kim Min-soo, Ryu Seong-cheol (Martial Arts) - The Battle: Roar to Victory; Son Seung-hyeon, Kim Shin-cheol (Visual Effects) - Svaha: The Sixth Finger; Im Seung-hui, Gwon Yu-jin (Costumes) - Swing Kids
**Best Music**	**Best Short Film**
**Kim Tae-seong - Svaha: The Sixth Finger**‡; Jung Jae-il - Parasite; Kim Jun-seok - Swing Kids; Mowg - Exit; Yeon Ri-mok - Tune in for Love	**Milk** (Director Jang Yoo-jin)‡

=== Other awards ===
Audience Choice Award for Most Popular Film	Popular Star Award
Extreme Job	Lee Kwang-soo - Inseparable Bros
Extreme Job	Park Hyung-sik - Juror 8
Extreme Job	Lee Hanee - Extreme Job
Extreme Job	Lim Yoona - Exit

== Films with multiple nominations and awards ==
Films with multiple nominations
Nominations	Films
11	Parasite
8	Exit
8	Extreme Job
8	Swing Kids
7	Svaha: The Sixth Finger
5	House of Hummingbird
5	The Battle: Roar to Victory
3	Birthday
3	Default
3	Tune in for Love

Films with multiple awards
Wins	Films
5	Parasite
2	Exit
2	Swing Kids

== Special performances ==
Artist	Performance	Ref.
Seventeen	"Hit", "Very Nice"	

== See also ==
- 56th Baeksang Arts Awards
- 56th Grand Bell Awards
