= Nikkan Sports Film Award for Best Foreign Film =

Annual Japanese film award

- Awarded for: Best Performance by a Foreign Film
- Country: Japan
- Presented by: Nikkan Sports
- First award: 1988
- Website: www.nikkansports.com/entertainment/award/ns-cinema/top-ns-cinema.html

The Nikkan Sports Film Award for Best Foreign Film is an award given at the Nikkan Sports Film Award.

== List of winners ==
No.	Year	Film	Director
1	1988	The Last Emperor	Bernardo Bertolucci
2	1989	Rain Man	Barry Levinson
3	1990	Ghost	Jerry Zucker
4	1991	Dances with Wolves	Kevin Costner
5	1992	Basic Instinct	Paul Verhoeven
6	1993	Unforgiven	Clint Eastwood
7	1994	Schindler's List	Steven Spielberg
8	1995	Speed	Jan de Bont
9	1996	Dead Man Walking	Tim Robbins
10	1997	The English Patient	Anthony Minghella
11	1998	L.A. Confidential	Curtis Hanson
12	1999	Elizabeth	Shekhar Kapur
13	2000	Gladiator	Ridley Scott
14	2001	Billy Elliot	Stephen Daldry
15	2002	The Son's Room	Nanni Moretti
16	2003	The Pianist	Roman Polanski
17	2004	The Last Samurai	Edward Zwick
18	2005	Million Dollar Baby	Clint Eastwood
19	2006	Brokeback Mountain	Ang Lee
20	2007	Letters from Iwo Jima	Clint Eastwood
21	2008	No Country for Old Men	Coen brothers
22	2009	Mother	Bong Joon-ho
23	2010	The Hurt Locker	Kathryn Bigelow
24	2011	The King's Speech	Tom Hooper
25	2012	The Intouchables	Olivier Nakache; Éric Toledano
26	2013	Les Misérables	Tom Hooper
27	2014	Frozen	Chris Buck; Jennifer Lee
28	2015	Whiplash	Damien Chazelle
29	2016	Spotlight	Tom McCarthy
30	2017	Dunkirk	Christopher Nolan
31	2018	Three Billboards Outside Ebbing, Missouri	Martin McDonagh
32	2019	Green Book	Peter Farrelly
33	2020	House of Hummingbird	Kim Bora
34	2021	Nomadland	Chloé Zhao
35	2022	Top Gun: Maverick	Joseph Kosinski
36	2023	Barbie	Greta Gerwig
37	2024	The Zone of Interest	Jonathan Glazer
38	2025	Conclave	Edward Berger
