= Moonlit Winter =

- Theatrical release poster
- Hangul: 윤희에게
- Lit.: To Yoon-hee
- RR: Yunhuiege
- MR: Yunhŭiege
- Directed by: Lim Dae-hyung
- Written by: Lim Dae-hyung
- Produced by: Park Doo-hee
- Starring: Kim Hee-ae; Kim So-hye; Sung Yoo-bin; Yūko Nakamura
- Cinematography: Moon Myung-hwan
- Edited by: Park Se-young
- Music by: Kim Hae-won
- Distributed by: Little Big Pictures
- Release dates: 12 October 2019 (BIFF); 14 November 2019 (South Korea)
- Running time: 105 minutes
- Country: South Korea
- Language: Korean

Moonlit Winter (Korean: 윤희에게; lit. ''To Yoon-hee'') is a 2019 South Korean romantic drama film written and directed by Lim Dae-hyung. It stars Kim Hee-ae, Kim So-hye, Sung Yoo-bin, and Yūko Nakamura. The film had its world premiere as the closing film for the 24th Busan International Film Festival. It was released in South Korea on 14 November 2019.

== Plot ==
Following her divorce, Yoon-hee (Kim Hee-ae) and her teenage daughter Sae-bom (Kim So-hye) live together in the Korean countryside. Sae-bom discovers a romantic letter written to her mother by Jun (Yūko Nakamura), a Korean-Japanese woman who went to school with Yoon-hee in her youth. Though the relationship is long in the past and remains a deep secret, Sae-bom recognises her mother's unrelenting loneliness and hopes to comfort her.

Upon graduating high school, Sae-bom insists she and her mother take a celebratory holiday to Japan, knowing Jun resides in the quiet and snowy village of Otaru. There, Yoon-hee immediately seeks out Jun's home but is unable to approach her. Soon after, Yoon-hee reveals that she knows Sae-bom is aware an "old friend" lives in the village but admits they haven't reconnected.

In the local cafe, Sae-bom meets Jun's aunt Masako and asks her to tell Jun to come to the cafe the next morning. At home, Jun confesses to her aunt that she and Yoon-hee are together in her dreams. Meanwhile, Yoon-hee discovers Sae-bom's boyfriend Kyung-soo has secretly come along to Otaru.

The next day, Sae-bom meets Jun and lies that her mother is not with her. She coordinates for Jun to "meet her for dinner" and Yoon-hee to "pick her up" at the same time and location. Saebom's plan works: the two women meet, overwhelmed by emotion, and walk along the canal together.

A final letter from Yoon-hee to Jun is revealed, in which she shares that she confessed her love for Jun to her parents, who sent her to a mental hospital. Later, she married a man set up for her by her brother, who she resents. On her wedding day, she thought of Jun; when strangers wish her happiness, she thinks of Jun. She concludes the two were never wrong for their love and should feel no shame.

Yoon-hee and Sae-bom move to Seoul, where Sae-bom attends university and Yoon-hee uses her newfound courage to open a restaurant.

== Cast ==
- Kim Hee-ae as Yoon-hee
- Kim So-hye as Sae-bom
- Sung Yoo-bin as Kyung-soo
- Yūko Nakamura as Jun Katase
- Hana Kino as Masako

== Accolades ==
Year	Award	Category	Recipient(s)	Result
2019	Cine 21 Awards	Best Film	Moonlit Winter	8th place
2020	56th Grand Bell Awards	Best Actress	Kim Hee-ae	Nominated
2020	7th Wildflower Film Awards	Grand Prize	Lim Dae-hyung	Nominated
2020	7th Wildflower Film Awards	Best Director	Lim Dae-hyung	Nominated
2020	7th Wildflower Film Awards	Best Producer	Park Doo-hee	Won
2020	25th Chunsa Film Art Awards	Best Director	Lim Dae-hyung	Nominated
2020	25th Chunsa Film Art Awards	Best Actress	Kim Hee-ae	Nominated
2020	25th Chunsa Film Art Awards	Best Screenplay	Lim Dae-hyung	Nominated
2020	25th Chunsa Film Art Awards	Best New Actress	Kim So-hye	Nominated
2020	56th Baeksang Arts Awards	Best Actress	Kim Hee-ae	Nominated
2020	56th Baeksang Arts Awards	Best New Actress	Kim So-hye	Nominated
2020	56th Baeksang Arts Awards	Best Screenplay	Lim Dae-hyung	Nominated
2020	Florence Korea Film Fest	Best Film	Moonlit Winter	Won
2020	29th Buil Film Awards	Best Film	Moonlit Winter	Nominated
2020	29th Buil Film Awards	Best Director	Lim Dae-hyung	Nominated
2020	29th Buil Film Awards	Best Actress	Kim Hee-ae	Nominated
2020	29th Buil Film Awards	Best New Actress	Kim So-hye	Nominated
2020	40th Korean Association of Film Critics Awards	Best Director	Lim Dae-hyung	Won
2020	40th Korean Association of Film Critics Awards	Best Screenplay	Lim Dae-hyung	Won
2020	40th Korean Association of Film Critics Awards	Best Soundtrack	Kim Hae-won	Won
2020	40th Korean Association of Film Critics Awards	Top 10 Films	Moonlit Winter	Won
2020	21st Busan Film Critics Awards	Best New Actress	Kim So-hye	Won
2020	7th Korean Film Producers Association Awards	Best Actress	Kim Hee-ae	Won
2021	41st Blue Dragon Film Awards	Best Film	Moonlit Winter	Nominated
2021	41st Blue Dragon Film Awards	Best Director	Lim Dae-hyung	Won
2021	41st Blue Dragon Film Awards	Best Leading Actress	Kim Hee-ae	Nominated
2021	41st Blue Dragon Film Awards	Best New Actress	Kim So-hye	Nominated
2021	41st Blue Dragon Film Awards	Best Screenplay	Lim Dae-hyung	Won
2021	41st Blue Dragon Film Awards	Best Editing	Park Se-young	Nominated
2021	41st Blue Dragon Film Awards	Best Music	Kim Hae-won	Nominated
2021	40th Golden Cinema Film Festival	Best New Actress	Kim So-hye	Won
