= Birthday (2019 film) =

- Theatrical release poster
- Hangul: 생일
- Hanja: 生日
- RR: Saengil
- MR: Saengil
- Directed by: Lee Jong-un
- Written by: Lee Jong-un
- Produced by: Lee Joon-dong; Lee Dong-ha; Lee Chang-dong
- Starring: Sul Kyung-gu; Jeon Do-yeon
- Cinematography: Cho Yong-kyu
- Edited by: Shin Min-kyung
- Music by: Lee Jae-jin
- Production companies: Nowfilm; Pinehouse Film; Redpeter Films
- Distributed by: Next Entertainment World
- Release date: 3 April 2019
- Running time: 120 minutes
- Country: South Korea
- Language: Korean
- Box office: US$8 million

Birthday is a 2019 South Korean drama film directed by Lee Jong-un, starring Sul Kyung-gu and Jeon Do-yeon. The first South Korean film to explore the sinking of the ferry MV Sewol, it opened the 21st Far East Film Festival on 26 April 2019.

== Plot ==
Ripped apart by the loss of their eldest son Su-ho to the Sewol ferry tragedy on 16 April 2014, Jung-il and Soon-nam struggle to keep their family together. No longer able to communicate with each other, they must still bring up their surviving daughter Ye-sol.

== Cast ==
- Sul Kyung-gu as Jung-il
- Jeon Do-yeon as Soon-nam
- Kim Bo-min as Ye-sol
- Yoon Chan-young as Su-ho
  - Choi Hyeon-jin as young Su-ho
- Kim Soo-jin as Woo-chan's mother
- Lee Bong-ryun as Jung-sook
- Park Jong-hwan as Yeong-joon
- Kwon So-hyun as Eun-bin
- Sung Yu-bin as Seong-joon
- Bang Jae-ho as Birthday party boy
- Tang Joon-sang as Woo-chan
- Kim Gye-seon as Hyeong-woo's mother
- Sun Wook-hyun as Hyeong-woo's father
- Kim Hyun as Geon-jae's mother
- Shin Mun-sung as Geon-jae's father
- Kim Min-jae as Immigration officer 1 (special appearance)

== Production ==
Principal photography began on April 10, 2018, and wrapped on July 6, 2018.

== Reception ==
=== Critical response ===
On review aggregator Rotten Tomatoes, the film holds an approval rating of 86% based on seven reviews, with an average rating of 6.7/10.

=== Accolades ===
Year	Award	Category	Nominee	Result
2019	55th Baeksang Arts Awards	Best New Director	Lee Jong-un	Nominated
2019	24th Chunsa Film Art Awards	Best New Director	Lee Jong-un	Nominated
2019	Balinale	Best Feature Film	Birthday	Won
2019	28th Buil Film Awards	Best Actor	Sul Kyung-gu	Nominated
2019	28th Buil Film Awards	Best Actress	Jeon Do-yeon	Won
2019	28th Buil Film Awards	Best New Director	Lee Jong-un	Nominated
2019	40th Blue Dragon Film Awards	Best Actor	Sul Kyung-gu	Nominated
2019	40th Blue Dragon Film Awards	Best Actress	Jeon Do-yeon	Nominated
2019	40th Blue Dragon Film Awards	Best New Director	Lee Jong-un	Nominated
2019	6th Korean Film Producers Association Awards	Best Actress	Jeon Do-yeon	Won
2019	19th Director's Cut Awards	Best Actress	Jeon Do-yeon	Nominated
2019	Women in Film Korea Awards	Best Screenplay	Lee Jong-un	Won
2020	56th Grand Bell Awards	Best Actor	Sul Kyung-gu	Nominated
2020	56th Grand Bell Awards	Best Actress	Jeon Do-yeon	Nominated
2020	56th Grand Bell Awards	Best Planning	Birthday	Nominated
2020	56th Baeksang Arts Awards	Best Director	Lee Jong-un	Nominated
2020	56th Baeksang Arts Awards	Best Actress	Jeon Do-yeon	Won
