= House of Hummingbird =

2018 South Korean film

- Theatrical release poster
- Directed by: Kim Bora
- Written by: Kim Bora
- Produced by: Zoe Sua Cho; Kim Bora
- Starring: Park Ji-hu; Kim Sae-byuk; Jung In-gi; Lee Seung-yeon; Park Soo-yeon
- Cinematography: Kang Gook-hyun
- Edited by: Zoe Sua Cho
- Music by: Matija Strniša
- Production companies: Epiphany Film; Mass Ornament Films
- Release dates: October 6, 2018 (Busan); August 29, 2019 (South Korea)
- Running time: 138 minutes
- Country: South Korea
- Language: Korean
- Box office: $1,041,948

House of Hummingbird (Korean: 벌새) is a 2018 South Korean drama film written and directed by Kim Bora. The film debuted in competition at the Busan International Film Festival's New Currents section in October 2018, where it won the NETPAC Award and the KNN Audience Award. The film has collected 59 awards including the Grand Prix of the Generation 14plus International Jury for the Best Film at the 69th Berlin International Film Festival and the Best International Narrative Feature Award at the 2019 Tribeca Film Festival.

== Plot ==
In Seoul in 1994, Eun-hee is a quiet 14-year-old from a working-class background preparing to enter high school. She loves drawing and hanging out with her best friend, Ji-suk, with whom she attends cram school. She is in love with her boyfriend, Ji-wan, who she is secretly dating. Her parents, especially her father, tend to ignore her needs and life in favor of helping her older brother, who abuses her physically and verbally. Her older sister is similarly ignored and abused. At her cram school, Eun-hee meets her new, free-spirited Chinese teacher, Ms. Kim, who she quickly forms a bond with. While dancing at a club with Ji-suk, she also meets Yu-ri, another schoolgirl who clearly has a crush on her, and the two become friends.

Eun-hee's life quickly unravels. She discovers a lump behind her ear, which doctors later determine requires surgery to remove. When caught shoplifting with Ji-suk, her father is called after Ji-suk reveals her identity in fear, leading to severe punishment for Eun-hee; when she confronts Ji-suk later, she refuses to apologize for the betrayal. Ji-wan is forced to break up with her after his wealthy mother discovers her identity and lower social class. Despite all the tribulations, Ms. Kim encourages Eun-hee to keep her spirit and continue to move forward. Eun-hee is deeply moved by her advice and grows attached to her teacher.

Eun-hee prepares to undergo surgery, and her father unexpectedly breaks down in sobs over his fear for her, revealing that he does truly care for her. The surgery is successful; Eun-hee makes up with Ji-suk, who apologizes and admits she betrayed her because she was frightened. Ms. Kim and Yu-ri also visit her in the hospital. Yu-ri reveals that she has a crush on Eun-hee, who seems to reciprocate and kisses her cheek.

Eun-hee discovers that Ms. Kim has quit her position at the school, and attempts to meet her as she is coming to collect her things, but an error on the part of another teacher causes her to be too late to see her, leaving her devastated. Distraught, she argues with her parents that night about her behavior and insults her brother for his poor grades despite his special attention. Enraged, he strikes her so hard he tears her eardrum, but when the doctor she visits suggests she presses charges, she declines. When the new semester begins, Eun-hee spots Yu-ri and attempts to speak with her, but Yu-ri rebuffs her. She later reveals to a confused Eun-hee that she no longer has a crush on her and has moved on. When she attempts to tell Ji-suk, Ji-suk reveals that she is dealing with her parents' divorce and that Eun-hee only thinks of herself sometimes.

While at school one day, the Seongsu Bridge collapses. Since Eun-hee's sister takes the route to school and her bus was involved in the accident, she becomes frightened, but learns that her sister survived due to being late. Eun-hee's brother breaks down in tears with relief, revealing (much like his father had with Eun-hee) that he cares for his siblings despite his abuse, though his sisters seem unimpressed. The next day, Ji-wan attempts to talk with Eun-hee, but she rebuffs him, telling him that she never liked him. She receives a package from Ms. Kim containing a letter and sketchbook, and tries to hand-deliver a thank-you note to Ms. Kim's return address. However, she discovers during her journey that Ms. Kim was killed in the bridge collapse the day before Eun-hee received the package. Heartbroken, Eun-hee returns home and speaks with her mother about her uncle, who died at the start of the film. Her mother tells her frankly that she misses her brother, and that it is difficult to comprehend that he is no longer around.

Early one morning, Eun-hee and her siblings drive to view the collapsed bridge, where she is overcome by tears as she accepts her grief and comes to terms with her loss. The next morning, the family eats breakfast together in harmony—with all the siblings treated equally and paid attention to—before Eun-hee departs for school. She re-reads the final letter Ms. Kim sent her, in which she apologizes for quitting and promises that there are always good experiences to follow bad ones. Despite standing alone in the schoolyard, Eun-hee appears mature and at peace.

== Cast ==
- Park Ji-hu as Eun-hee
- Kim Sae-byuk as Young-ji
- Jung In-gi as Eun-hee's father
- Lee Seung-yeon as Eun-hee's mother
- Park Soo-yeon as Soo-hee
- Son Sang-yeon as Dae-hoon
- Park Seo-yoon as Ji-sook
- Jung Yoon-seo as Ji-wan
- Seol Hye-in as Yoo-ri
- Hyung Young-seon as Eun-hee's uncle
- Gil Hae-yeon as Young-ji's mother
- Park Yoon-hee as Homeroom teacher
- Son Yong-beom as Joon-tae
- Ahn Jin-hyun as Min-ji

== Production ==
=== Writing ===
Kim Bora, who also wrote the script as well as directed, draws from her own childhood as inspiration for this coming-of-age film, focusing on a pivotal moment in her life, the collapse of the Seongsu bridge in 1994. Her intended outcome, as stated in an interview by Marina D. Ritcher, was to create a "fictional film based on very personal experiences." She wanted to highlight the rapid modernization of Korea and the consequences that came with trying to change too much too quickly. Ji Hyuck Moon, in his article "Cracks Everywhere: How the Seongsu Bridge Collapse Changed Seoul's Urban Personality" talks about the phrase, "Bbali, bbali" that was used to describe this rapid modernization that Kim portrays in her film.

=== Casting ===
As for casting the main role of Eun-hee, it took director Kim Bora three years to find her perfect Eun-hee, Park Ji-hu. They first met in the audition room where Park Ji-hu was asked to read a scene with her onscreen mentor Yeong-ji, Bora states Park Ji-hu was "everything I was hoping for."

=== Filming ===
Cinematographer Kang Kuk-hyun's goal was to remain as true to the time period as possible and make the film as realistic looking as possible. Throughout the film Kang Kuk-hyun and Kim Bora worked to use the camera to bring out Eun-hee's emotions, every move of the camera was intentional to bring out the maximum emotional impact. Kim's goal on the other hand as director, was not to portray any one character negatively, saying that by giving a more nuanced portrayal of the characters she shows how "no one can win in a patriarchal system."

=== Soundtrack ===
Matija Strniša, who wrote the music for House of Hummingbird, won the best original score for his work at the Valencia International Film Festival. The music was made to be electronic and also represent the time period, described as "classical-inspired electronic music."

== Reception ==
=== Box office ===
Domestically, in South Korea House of Hummingbird grossed $997,953. It opened in 140 theaters and in its opening weekend, it made $103,027.

=== Critical response ===
House of Hummingbird received a generally positive critical response. It holds a 100% on Rotten Tomatoes, with a total of 46 critical reviews. The site's critical consensus reads, "A striking debut for writer-director Kim Bora, House of Hummingbird delicately captures a turning point in one young woman's life." On Metacritic, the film has an overall score of 82 out of 100 out of a total out of 10 positive reviews.

Tomris Laffly from Variety describes the film as capturing the "soft-hued timeless look" of a time period that remains somewhat "hazy." Her review praises the nonintrusive way Bora Kim explores Eun-hee's sexuality, never giving it a strict label and allowing the viewer to join watching Eun-hee in her journey of self discovery. While she does admit the movie may have been too long for its premise, overall she states it "fleeting reality of female adolescence with sympathy" and entwines the "workings of both family and society."

Elizabeth Kerr from The Hollywood Reporter chose to focus more on the femininity of film. Overall she describes it as "sensitive, keenly observed, and unflinchingly honest," and claims that it deserves success in its upcoming run. She praised the relationship that forms between Eun-hee and Yeong-ji, saying when the two are on screen together they are allowed to fully be free in a way of quotidian struggles.

Andrew Bundy from The Playlist talks about how the film explores the fine line of "harsh and heartfelt communication," and how Yeong-ji helps Eun-hee discover their difference all comes down to personal understanding. While a little long, Bundy praises the film on exploring the path to show the importance of empathy and understanding.

In 2020, the film was ranked by The Guardian number 18 among the classics of modern South Korean cinema.

=== Accolades ===
Awards	Category	Recipient	Result
Asian Film Critics Association Awards	Best New Director	Kim Bora	Won
Beijing International Film Festival	Best New Film	House of Hummingbird	Nominated
Beijing International Film Festival	Special Mention	Kim Bora	Won
Bergen International Film Festival	Cinema Extraordinaire	Kim Bora	Won
Berlin International Film Festival	Grand Prix of the Generation 14plus International Jury for the Best Film	House of Hummingbird	Won
Berlin International Film Festival	Crystal Bear for Generation 14plus - Best Film	House of Hummingbird	Nominated
Berlin International Film Festival	Teddy for Best Feature Film	House of Hummingbird	Nominated
Busan International Film Festival	KNN Award	House of Hummingbird	Won
Busan International Film Festival	NETPAC Award	House of Hummingbird	Won
Heartland Film Festival	Grand Prize	House of Hummingbird	Won
Hong Kong Asian Film Festival	New Talent Award	Kim Bora	Won
International Istanbul Film Festival	Golden Tulip	House of Hummingbird	Won
Jerusalem Film Festival	FIPRESCI Prize	House of Hummingbird	Won
BFI London Film Festival	Sutherland Trophy	House of Hummingbird	Nominated
Molodist International Film Festival	Best Feature Film	House of Hummingbird	Won
Molodist International Film Festival	FIPRESCI Prize	House of Hummingbird	Won
Seattle International Film Festival	Grand Jury Prize	House of Hummingbird	Won
Taipei Film Festival	Grand Prize	Kim Bora	Nominated
Taipei Film Festival	Special Jury Prize	Kim Bora	Won
Transatlantyk Festival	Transatlantyk Distribution Award for Section "New Cinema"	Kim Bora	Nominated
Tribeca Film Festival	Best International Narrative Feature	House of Hummingbird	Won
Tribeca Film Festival	Best Actress	Park Ji-hu	Won
Tribeca Film Festival	Best Cinematography	Kang Gook-hyun	Won
Malaysia International Film Festival	Best Director	Kim Bora	Won
Malaysia International Film Festival	Best Supporting Actress	Kim Sae-byuk	Won
Malaysia International Film Festival	Best Cinematography	Kang Gook-hyun	Won
Los Angeles Asian Pacific Film Festival	Best Narrative Feature	House of Hummingbird	Won
Blue Dragon Film Awards	Best Film	House of Hummingbird	Nominated
Blue Dragon Film Awards	Best Supporting Actress	Kim Sae-byuk	Nominated
Blue Dragon Film Awards	Best New Actress	Park Ji-hu	Nominated
Blue Dragon Film Awards	Best New Director	Kim Bora	Nominated
Blue Dragon Film Awards	Best Screenplay	Kim Bora	Won
Asia Pacific Screen Awards	Best Actress	Park Ji-hu	Nominated
Korean Association of Film Critics Awards	Best Supporting Actress	Kim Sae-byuk	Won
Korean Association of Film Critics Awards	Best New Director	Kim Bora	Won
Korean Association of Film Critics Awards	FIPRESCI Award	Kim Bora	Won
Korean Association of Film Critics Awards	Best New Actress	Park Ji-hu	Won
Korean Association of Film Critics Awards	Top 10 Films of the Year	House of Hummingbird	Won
Director's Cut Awards	Best Director	Kim Bora	Nominated
Director's Cut Awards	Best Actress	Park Ji-hu	Nominated
Director's Cut Awards	Best New Actress	Park Ji-hu	Won
Director's Cut Awards	Best New Director	Kim Bora	Won
Director's Cut Awards	Best Screenplay	Kim Bora	Nominated
Busan Film Critics Awards	Best Cinematography	Kang Gook-hyun	Won
Grand Bell Awards	Best Film	House of Hummingbird	Nominated
Grand Bell Awards	Best Director	Kim Bora	Nominated
Grand Bell Awards	Best Supporting Actress	Kim Sae-byuk	Nominated
Grand Bell Awards	Best New Actress	Park Ji-hu	Nominated
Grand Bell Awards	Best New Director	Kim Bora	Won
Grand Bell Awards	Best Screenplay	Kim Bora	Nominated
Grand Bell Awards	Best Cinematography	Kang Gook-hyun	Nominated
Grand Bell Awards	Best Music	Matija Strniša	Nominated
Cine21 Awards	Best Film	House of Hummingbird	2nd place
Cine21 Awards	Best New Director	Kim Bora	Won
Cine21 Awards	Best New Actress	Park Ji-hu	Won
Chunsa Film Art Awards	Best Supporting Actress	Kim Sae-byuk	Nominated
Chunsa Film Art Awards	Best New Actress	Park Ji-hu	Nominated
Chunsa Film Art Awards	Best New Director	Kim Bora	Nominated
Chunsa Film Art Awards	Best Screenplay	Kim Bora	Nominated
Buil Film Awards	Best Film	House of Hummingbird	Won
Buil Film Awards	Best Director	Kim Bora	Nominated
Buil Film Awards	Best Supporting Actress	Kim Sae-byuk	Nominated
Buil Film Awards	Best New Actress	Park Ji-hu	Nominated
Buil Film Awards	Best New Director	Kim Bora	Nominated
Buil Film Awards	Best Screenplay	Kim Bora	Won
Buil Film Awards	Best Cinematography	Kang Gook-hyun	Nominated
Baeksang Arts Awards	Best Film	House of Hummingbird	Nominated
Baeksang Arts Awards	Best Director	Kim Bora	Won
Baeksang Arts Awards	Best Supporting Actress	Kim Sae-byuk	Won
Baeksang Arts Awards	Best New Actress	Park Ji-hu	Nominated
Baeksang Arts Awards	Best New Director	Kim Bora	Nominated
Baeksang Arts Awards	Best Screenplay	Kim Bora	Nominated
Wildflower Film Awards	Grand Prize	Kim Bora	Nominated
Wildflower Film Awards	Best Director	Kim Bora	Nominated
Wildflower Film Awards	Best Actress	Park Ji-hu	Won
Wildflower Film Awards	Best Supporting Actress	Kim Sae-byuk	Nominated
Wildflower Film Awards	Best New Actress	Park Ji-hu	Nominated
Wildflower Film Awards	Best Screenplay	Kim Bora	Nominated
Wildflower Film Awards	Best Cinematography	Kang Gook-hyun	Won
Korean Film Producers Association Awards	Best Film	House of Hummingbird	Won
Ale Kino! International Young Audience Film Festival	Best Film	House of Hummingbird	Nominated
Cyprus International Film Festival	Glocal Images	Kim Bora, Mass Ornament Films	Won
Heartland Film Festival	Grand Prize for Best Narrative Feature	House of Hummingbird	Won
International Istanbul Film Festival	Golden Tulip	House of Hummingbird	Won
Seoul Independent Film Festival	Best Film	House of Hummingbird	Won
Seoul Independent Film Festival	Committee Award	Kim Bora	Won
Washington West Film Festival	Best Feature Narrative Director	Kim Bora	Won
Nikkan Sports Film Award	Best Foreign Film	House of Hummingbird	Won
Ljubljana LGBT Film Festival	Pink Dragon Jury Award	House of Hummingbird	Won
