= Kim Bora =

South Korean filmmaker

Kim Bora 김보라
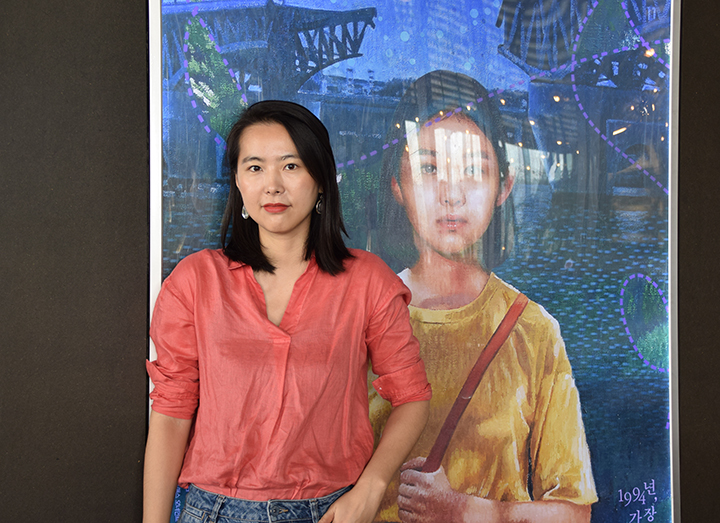
- Kim in 2019
- Born: November 30, 1981 (age 44); Seoul, South Korea
- Education: Kyewon Arts High School; Dongguk University (B.A.); Columbia University (M.F.A.)
- Occupation: Filmmaker
- Years active: 2018–present
- Notable work: House of Hummingbird

Korean name
- Hangul: 김보라
- RR: Gim Bora
- MR: Kim Pora

Kim Bora (Korean: 김보라) is a South Korean filmmaker with an MFA in Film Directing from Columbia University. She is represented by Creative Artists Agency (CAA). Her debut feature film, House of Hummingbird, premiered at the Berlin International Film Festival, where it won the Best Film Award in the Generation section. House of Hummingbird was named one of the classics of modern South Korean cinema by The Guardian, as well as a New York Times Critics’ Pick. It went on to receive 62 awards from prestigious festivals, including Tribeca Film Festival, BFI London Film Festival, Istanbul Film Festival, and the Busan International Film Festival, as well as Korea’s Blue Dragon and Baeksang Arts Awards—often referred to as the Korean Oscars.

== Career ==
Born in South Korea in 1981, Kim Bora graduated from Dongguk University with a degree in film. In 2007, she left for Columbia University in the U.S., and received a Masters of Fine Arts in film directing. Her film The Recorder Exam (2011) was her created graduation film project, and it won Best Student Filmmaker for the East Region from the Directors Guild of America. After the release of the film, Kim began to work on the script that would be based on her own childhood. Later, she moved back to Korea and gave lectures in the colleges where she studied.

In 2018, after seven years of working on the script and production, her debut film House of Hummingbird was released, winning multiple awards. The film also received production support from the Korean Film Council (KOFIC), Seoul Film Commission, as well as Asian Cinima Fund of Busan International Film Festival. House of Hummingbird is a coming-of-age film about a girl, Eun-hee, who was a part of the expanding 1990's economy, and, due to her flawed family, is searching for validation through love and reasons to continue living. Kim said that the incidents in this film are based on incidents and events that occurred throughout her childhood, after having a nightmare while living in New York and decided to understand what she had gone through.

== Filmography ==
- The Recorder Exam (2011) - director
- House of Hummingbird (2018) - director, screenwriter, executive producer

== Awards and nominations ==
Year	Awards	Category	Recipient	Result	Ref
2011	2011 DGA Student Awards	Best Woman Student Filmmaker- East Region	The Recorder Exam	Won	
2011	Woodstock Film Festival	Best Student Short Film	The Recorder Exam	Won	
2018	Busan International Film Festival	KNN Award	House of Hummingbird	Won	
2018	Busan International Film Festival	NETPAC Award	House of Hummingbird	Won	
2018	Seoul Independent Film Festival	Best Film	House of Hummingbird	Won	
2018	Seoul Independent Film Festival	Committee Award	House of Hummingbird	Won	
2019	Beijing International Film Festival	Best New Film	House of Hummingbird	Nominated	
2019	Beijing International Film Festival	Special Mention (Forward Future Award)	House of Hummingbird	Won	
2019	Bergen International Film Festival	Cinema Extraordinaire	House of Hummingbird	Won	
2019	Berlin International Film Festival	Grand Prix of the Generation 14plus International Jury for the Best Film	House of Hummingbird	Won	
2019	Berlin International Film Festival	Crystal Bear for Generation 14plus - Best Film	House of Hummingbird	Nominated	
2019	Berlin International Film Festival	Teddy for Best Feature Film	House of Hummingbird	Nominated	
2019	Heartland Film Festival	Grand Prize	House of Hummingbird	Won	
2019	Hong Kong Asian Film Festival	New Talent Award	House of Hummingbird	Won	
2019	International Istanbul Film Festival	Golden Tulip	House of Hummingbird	Won	
2019	Jerusalem Film Festival	FIPRESCI Prize	House of Hummingbird	Won	
2019	BFI London Film Festival	Sutherland Trophy	House of Hummingbird	Nominated	
2019	Seattle International Film Festival	Grand Jury Prize	House of Hummingbird	Won	
2019	Molodist International Film Festival	Best Feature Film	House of Hummingbird	Won	
2019	Molodist International Film Festival	FIPRESCI Prize	House of Hummingbird	Won	
2019	Taipei Film Festival	Grand Prize	House of Hummingbird	Nominated	
2019	Taipei Film Festival	Special Jury Prize	House of Hummingbird	Won	
2019	Transatlantyk Festival	Transatlantyk Distribution Award for Section "New Cinema"	House of Hummingbird	Nominated	
2019	Tribeca Film Festival	Best International Narrative Feature	House of Hummingbird	Won	
2019	Malaysia International Film Festival	Best Director	House of Hummingbird	Won	
2019	Los Angeles Asian Pacific Film Festival	Best Narrative Feature	House of Hummingbird	Won	
2019	Blue Dragon Film Awards	Best Film	House of Hummingbird	Nominated	
2019	Blue Dragon Film Awards	Best New Director	House of Hummingbird	Nominated	
2019	Blue Dragon Film Awards	Best Screenplay	House of Hummingbird	Won	
2019	Korean Association of Film Critics Awards	Best New Director	House of Hummingbird	Won	
2019	Korean Association of Film Critics Awards	FIPRESCI Award	House of Hummingbird	Won	
2019	Korean Association of Film Critics Awards	Top 10 Films of the Year	House of Hummingbird	Won	
2019	Director's Cut Awards	Best Director	House of Hummingbird	Nominated	
2019	Director's Cut Awards	Best New Director	House of Hummingbird	Won	
2019	Director's Cut Awards	Best Screenplay	House of Hummingbird	Nominated	
2019	Grand Bell Awards	Best Film	House of Hummingbird	Nominated	
2019	Grand Bell Awards	Best Director	House of Hummingbird	Nominated	
2019	Grand Bell Awards	Best New Director	House of Hummingbird	Won	
2019	Grand Bell Awards	Best Screenplay	House of Hummingbird	Nominated	
2019	Ale Kino! International Young Audience Film Festival	Best Film	House of Hummingbird	Nominated	
2019	Cine21 Awards	Best Film	House of Hummingbird	2nd place	
2019	Cine21 Awards	Best New Director	House of Hummingbird	Won	
2019	Chunsa Film Art Awards	Best New Director	House of Hummingbird	Nominated	
2019	Chunsa Film Art Awards	Best Screenplay	House of Hummingbird	Nominated	
2019	Athens International Film Festival	Best Screenplay	House of Hummingbird	Won	
2019	Cyprus International Film Festival	Glocal Images (Note: with Mass Ornament Films)	House of Hummingbird	Won	
2019	Korean Film Producers Association Awards	Best Film	House of Hummingbird	Won	
2019	Cinema Jove-Valencia International Film Festival	Best Film	House of Hummingbird	Won	
2019	Cinema Jove-Valencia International Film Festival	Best Directing	House of Hummingbird	Won	
2019	Heartland Film Festival	Grand Prize for Best Narrative Feature	House of Hummingbird	Won	
2019	International Istanbul Film Festival	Golden Tulip	House of Hummingbird	Won	
2019	Ljubljana LGBT Film Festival	Pink Dragon Jury Award	House of Hummingbird	Won	
2019	Nikkan Sports Film Award	Best Foreign Film	House of Hummingbird	Won	
2019	Washington West Film Festival	Best Feature Narrative Director	House of Hummingbird	Won	
2020	Asian Film Critics Association Awards	NETPAC Award Best New Director	House of Hummingbird	Won	
2020	56th Baeksang Arts Awards	Best Film	House of Hummingbird	Nominated	
2020	56th Baeksang Arts Awards	Best Director	House of Hummingbird	Won	
2020	56th Baeksang Arts Awards	Best New Director	House of Hummingbird	Nominated	
2020	56th Baeksang Arts Awards	Best Screenplay	House of Hummingbird	Nominated	
2020	Black Movie Film Festival	Young Adults Jury Award	House of Hummingbird	Won	
2020	Black Movie Film Festival	Critics Prize	House of Hummingbird	Won	
2020	Buil Film Awards	Best Film	House of Hummingbird	Won	
2020	Buil Film Awards	Best Director	House of Hummingbird	Nominated	
2020	Buil Film Awards	Best New Director	House of Hummingbird	Nominated	
2020	Buil Film Awards	Best Screenplay	House of Hummingbird	Won	
2020	Wildflower Film Awards	Grand Prize	House of Hummingbird	Nominated	
2020	Wildflower Film Awards	Best Director	House of Hummingbird	Nominated	
2020	Wildflower Film Awards	Best Screenplay	House of Hummingbird	Nominated	
