= By Quantum Physics: A Nightlife Venture =

2019 South Korean crime film

- Film poster
- Hangul: 양자물리학
- Hanja: 量子物理學
- RR: Yangja mullihak
- MR: Yangja mullihak
- Directed by: Lee Seong-tae
- Written by: Lee Seong-tae
- Produced by: Kim Young-min; Kim Sang-su
- Starring: Park Hae-soo; Seo Yea-ji; Kim Sang-ho; Kim Eung-soo; Byun Hee-bong; Kim Young-jae; Lee Chang-hoon
- Production company: MCMC
- Distributed by: Finecut Co., Ltd.
- Release date: 15 September 2019 (South Korea)
- Running time: 119 minutes
- Country: South Korea
- Language: Korean

By Quantum Physics: A Nightlife Venture (Korean: 양자물리학) is a 2019 South Korean crime film starring Park Hae-soo, Seo Yea-ji, and Kim Sang-ho.

== Plot ==
The story is about a night club owner Lee Chan-woo (Park Hae-soo), his club manager Seong Eun-yeong (Seo Yea-ji) and police reporter Park Ki-hum (Kim Sang-ho) who fight against an organized crime involving drug abuse and police corruption.

== Cast ==
- Park Hae-soo as Lee Chan-woo, a nightclub promoter
- Seo Yea-ji as Sung Eun-young, the nightclub manager
- Kim Sang-ho as Park Ki-hun
- Kim Eung-soo as Jung Kap-taek, a corrupt businessman and gangster
- Byun Hee-bong as Baek Young-kam, a corrupt politician
- Kim Young-jae as Choi Ji-hoon
- Lee Chang-hoon as Yang Yoon-sik, a corrupt prosecutor
- Park Sung-yeon as Prosecutor Yang's assistant
- Im Chul-soo as Kim Sang-soo
- Hyun Bong-sik as Kim Kwan-chul
- Joo Suk-tae as Department Head Moon
- Son Jong-hak as Bureau Director Kim
- Park Kwang-sun as Fractal
- Choi Tae-joon as Kim Jung-min
- Kim Won-sik as Criminal Intelligence Division Team Leader Min
- Kim Jung-woo as Prosecutor Choi
- Kim Mi-hye as Reporter Lee Sun-hee

== Awards and nominations ==
Year	Award	Category	Recipient	Result	Ref.
2019	40th Blue Dragon Film Awards	Best New Actor	Park Hae-soo	Won	
2019	19th Director's Cut Awards	Best New Actor	Park Hae-soo	Nominated	
2020	56th Grand Bell Awards	Best New Actor	Park Hae-soo	Nominated	
2020	25th Chunsa Film Art Awards	Best New Actor	Park Hae-soo	Won	
2020	29th Buil Film Awards	Best New Actor	Park Hae-soo	Nominated	
2020	29th Buil Film Awards	Popular Star Award	Seo Yea-ji	Won	
