= Another Child =

- Theatrical release poster
- Hangul: 미성년
- Hanja: 未成年
- RR: Miseongnyeon
- MR: Misŏngnyŏn
- Directed by: Kim Yoon-seok
- Written by: Kim Yoon-seok; Lee Bo-ram
- Produced by: Lee Dong-ha; Jay SB Ji
- Starring: Yum Jung-ah; Kim So-jin; Kim Hye-jun; Park Se-jin; Kim Yoon-seok
- Cinematography: Hwang Ki-seok
- Edited by: Kim Sun-min
- Production companies: Redpeter Films; Huayi Brothers Korea
- Distributed by: Showbox
- Release date: April 11, 2019
- Running time: 96 minutes
- Country: South Korea
- Language: Korean
- Box office: US$1.4 million

Another Child is a 2019 South Korean drama film directed by Kim Yoon-seok in his directorial debut. It stars Yum Jung-ah, Kim So-jin, Kim Hye-jun, Park Se-jin, and Kim Yoon-seok.

== Plot ==
Joo-ri and Yoon-ah, both second-year students at the same school, meet on the rooftop. The two have recently discovered something that happened between Joo-ri's father, Dae-won, and Yoon-ah's mother, Mi-hee. Wanting to prevent the situation from escalating, Joo-ri tries to handle it somehow without her mother, Young-joo, finding out. But Yoon-ah, saying she has no interest in the adults' affairs, wants nothing to do with it. Just then, Yoon-ah picks up Joo-ri's dropped phone and answers a call from Young-joo, and ends up revealing a shocking secret that had been hidden all along. Seeing this, Joo-ri is thrown into total panic.

== Cast ==
- Yum Jung-ah as Young-joo
- Kim So-jin as Mi-hee
- Kim Hye-jun as Joo-ri
- Park Se-jin as Yoon-ah
- Kim Yoon-seok as Dae-won
- Kim Hee-won as Teacher Kim
- Lee Hee-joon as Park Seo-bang
- Lee Jung-eun as Breakwater middle-aged woman
- Yeom Hye-ran as Pregnant woman's mom
- Lee Sang-hee as Nurse in charge
- Kim Hye-yoon as Jung Hyun-joo

== Production ==
Principal photography began on February 3, 2018, and wrapped on April 3, 2018.

== Accolades ==
Award	Category	Recipient	Result
28th Buil Film Awards	Best New Actress	Kim Hye-jun	Nominated
56th Grand Bell Awards	Best Supporting Actress	Kim So-jin	Nominated
56th Grand Bell Awards	Best New Actress	Park Se-jin	Nominated
56th Grand Bell Awards	Best New Director	Kim Yoon-seok	Nominated
40th Blue Dragon Film Awards	Best New Actress	Kim Hye-jun	Won
