= Park Ji-hu =

South Korean actress (born 2003)

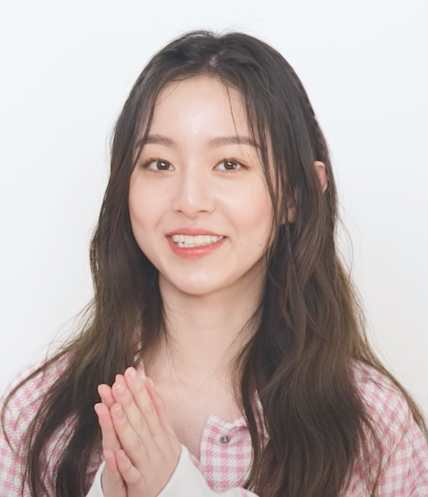
- Park in April 2022
- Born: November 7, 2003 (age 22); Daegu, South Korea
- Education: Hanyang University (Theater and Film)
- Occupation: Actress
- Years active: 2016–present
- Agent: BH Entertainment
- Awards: Full list

Korean name
- Hangul: 박지후
- Hanja: 朴持厚
- RR: Bak Jihu
- MR: Pak Chihu
- Website: bhent.co.kr

Park Ji-hu (Korean: 박지후; born November 7, 2003) is a South Korean actress. She is best known for her leading roles in the film House of Hummingbird (2018), in the Netflix original series All of Us Are Dead (2022–present) and tvN's Little Women (2022).

== Early life and education ==
Park was born in Daegu, South Korea. She was accepted in Hanyang University's department of theater and film in November 2021. In February 2022, Park graduated from Dongmoon High School.

== Career ==
=== 2014–present: Beginnings and breakthrough ===
In 2014, Park started acting occasionally after participating in a street audition. She then made her acting debut in the short film Home Without Me in 2016, before landing minor roles in mainstream productions Vanishing Time: A Boy Who Returned (2016), Fabricated City (2017), and The Witness (2018).

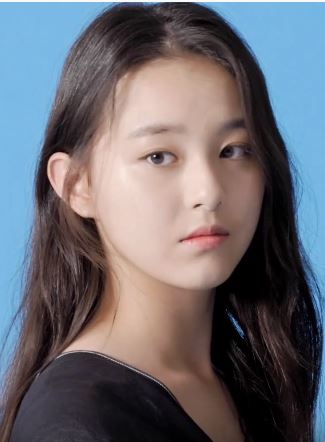
Park in 2019

In 2018, Park starred in indie sensation House of Hummingbird, playing her first leading role in a feature film. She achieved recognition and won multiple accolades for her performance in the movie.

In 2021, Park filmed Um Tae-hwa's disaster thriller film Concrete Utopia alongside Lee Byung-hun, Park Bo-young and Park Seo-joon. The movie was released in 2023.

In 2022, she gained international recognition after appearing as Nam On-jo in the zombie apocalypse Netflix original series All of Us Are Dead. She also appeared in tvN's series Little Women alongside Kim Go-eun, Nam Ji-hyun, and Wi Ha-joon, which is also streaming on Netflix.

== Filmography ==
=== Film ===
Year	Title	Role	Notes	Ref.
2016	Vanishing Time: A Boy Who Returned	Soo-rin look-alike kid	Bit part	
2017	Fabricated City	Female high school student 1		
2018	The Witness	Ye-seul		
2018	House of Hummingbird	Kim Eun-hee		
2021	Black Light	Eun-young		
2023	Concrete Utopia	Hye-won		

=== Television series ===
Year	Title	Role	Notes	Ref.
2018	Sweet Revenge 2	Lee Ha-yan		
2019	Beautiful World	Jung Da-hee		
2022–present	All of Us Are Dead	Nam On-jo	Season 1–2	
2022	Little Women	Oh In-hye		
2023	Miraculous Brothers	young Chae Woo-jung	Cameo	
2025	Spring of Youth	Kim Bom		
2025	Spirit Fingers	Song Woo-yeon (Baby Blue Finger)		

=== Hosting ===
Year	Title	Notes	Ref.
2023–2024	Inkigayo	with Yeonjun and Woonhak	

=== Music video appearances ===
Year	Title	Artist	Ref.
2022	"Ditto"	NewJeans	

== Accolades ==
=== Awards and nominations ===
Name of the award ceremony, year presented, category, nominee of the award, and the result of the nomination
Award ceremony	Year	Category	Nominee / Work	Result	Ref.
APAN Star Awards	2022	Best New Actress	All of Us Are Dead	Won	
Asia Pacific Screen Awards	2019	Best Actress	House of Hummingbird	Nominated	
Baeksang Arts Awards	2020	Best New Actress – Film	House of Hummingbird	Nominated	
Blue Dragon Film Awards	2019	Best New Actress	House of Hummingbird	Nominated	
Blue Dragon Series Awards	2022	Best New Actress	All of Us Are Dead	Nominated	
Buil Film Awards	2020	Best New Actress	House of Hummingbird	Nominated	
Chunsa Film Art Awards	2020	Best New Actress	House of Hummingbird	Nominated	
Cine21 Awards	2019	Best New Actress	House of Hummingbird	Won	
Director's Cut Awards	2019	Best New Actress	House of Hummingbird	Won	
Director's Cut Awards	2023	Best Actress in Television	All of Us Are Dead	Nominated	
Grand Bell Awards	2020	Best New Actress	House of Hummingbird	Nominated	
Korea Best Star Awards	2019	Best New Actress	House of Hummingbird	Won	
Korean Association of Film Critics Awards	2019	Best New Actress	House of Hummingbird	Won	
London East Asia Film Festival	2019	Best New Actress	House of Hummingbird	Won	
Tribeca Film Festival	2019	Best New Actress	House of Hummingbird	Won	
Wildflower Film Awards	2020	Best New Actress	House of Hummingbird	Won	

=== Listicles ===
Name of publisher, year listed, name of listicle, and placement
Publisher	Year	Listicle	Placement	Ref.
Cine21	2021	New Actress to watch out for in 2022	6th (Note: Tied with Go Min-si, Park Eun-bin, Keum Sae-rok, Moon Ga-young, Joo Hyun-young, Park Gyu-young, Lee Soo-kyung, Roh Yoon-seo, Gong Seung-yeon, Lee Se-young, IU, Keum Sae-rok, Han So-hee, Jung Ji-so, Bang Min-ah, Jeon Jong-seo, Roh Jeong-eui)	
Korean Film Council	2021	Korean Actors 200 (Note: Introduces 200 actors that best represent the present and future of Korean cinema to the people in the film industry all over the world.)	Included	
