= 56th Baeksang Arts Awards =

2020 edition of award ceremony

- Title card
- Date: June 5, 2020
- Site: Hall 7, KINTEX, Ilsanseo-gu, Goyang, Gyeonggi Province
- Hosted by: Shin Dong-yup; Bae Suzy; Park Bo-gum
- Organised by: Ilgan Sports; JTBC Plus

Highlights
- Most wins: Film: Parasite (3); Television: When the Camellia Blooms (4)
- Most nominations: Film: Parasite (12); Television: When the Camellia Blooms (10)
- Grand Prize – Film: Bong Joon-ho (director & co-screenwriter) – Parasite
- Grand Prize – TV: When the Camellia Blooms (drama)
- Website: http://www.baeksangawards.co.kr/

Television/radio coverage
- Network: JTBC
- Viewership: 2.8% (Nielsen Korea)

The 56th Baeksang Arts Awards (Korean: 제56회 백상예술대상) ceremony, organised by Ilgan Sports and JTBC Plus, was held on June 5, 2020, at KINTEX, Ilsanseo-gu, Gyeonggi Province, hosted by Shin Dong-yup, Bae Suzy and Park Bo-gum for the third consecutive year. The annual awards ceremony is one of South Korea's most prestigious award shows, recognizing excellence in film, television, and theatre. The ceremony was initially set for May 1, but was delayed due to the COVID-19 pandemic. It did not invite an on-site audience to prevent the spread of the disease.

The nominations were announced on May 8, 2020. Parasite, which received the most nominations, was nominated in all film-related categories except for Best New Director for which the film does not qualify. For the first time ever, Netflix shows were nominated for the Baeksang Arts Awards, with the film Time to Hunt and the series Kingdom. The Theatre division was also revived for the first time in 19 years, with Baeksang Play, Best Actor and Best Actress added to the existing Best Short Play.

The highest honors of the night, Grand Prize (Daesang), were awarded to director Bong Joon-ho of Parasite in the film division and drama series When the Camellia Blooms in the television division. The candidates for Grand Prize – Film were Bong Joon-ho and Parasite. Bong was quickly selected as the winner due to the huge role he played in the film's success, leaving Parasite winning Best Film on a unanimous vote. The candidates for Grand Prize – Television were When the Camellia Blooms, Mister Trot and Kim Hee-ae of The World of the Married. When the Camellia Blooms was chosen as the winner in the third round of votes. Best Drama was initially won by When the Camellia Blooms, however per Baeksang rule, (Note: Grand Prize for Television winners are ineligible for other major awards they are nominated for in Television division.) it went to Hot Stove League, the series with the second highest votes.

== Winners and nominees ==
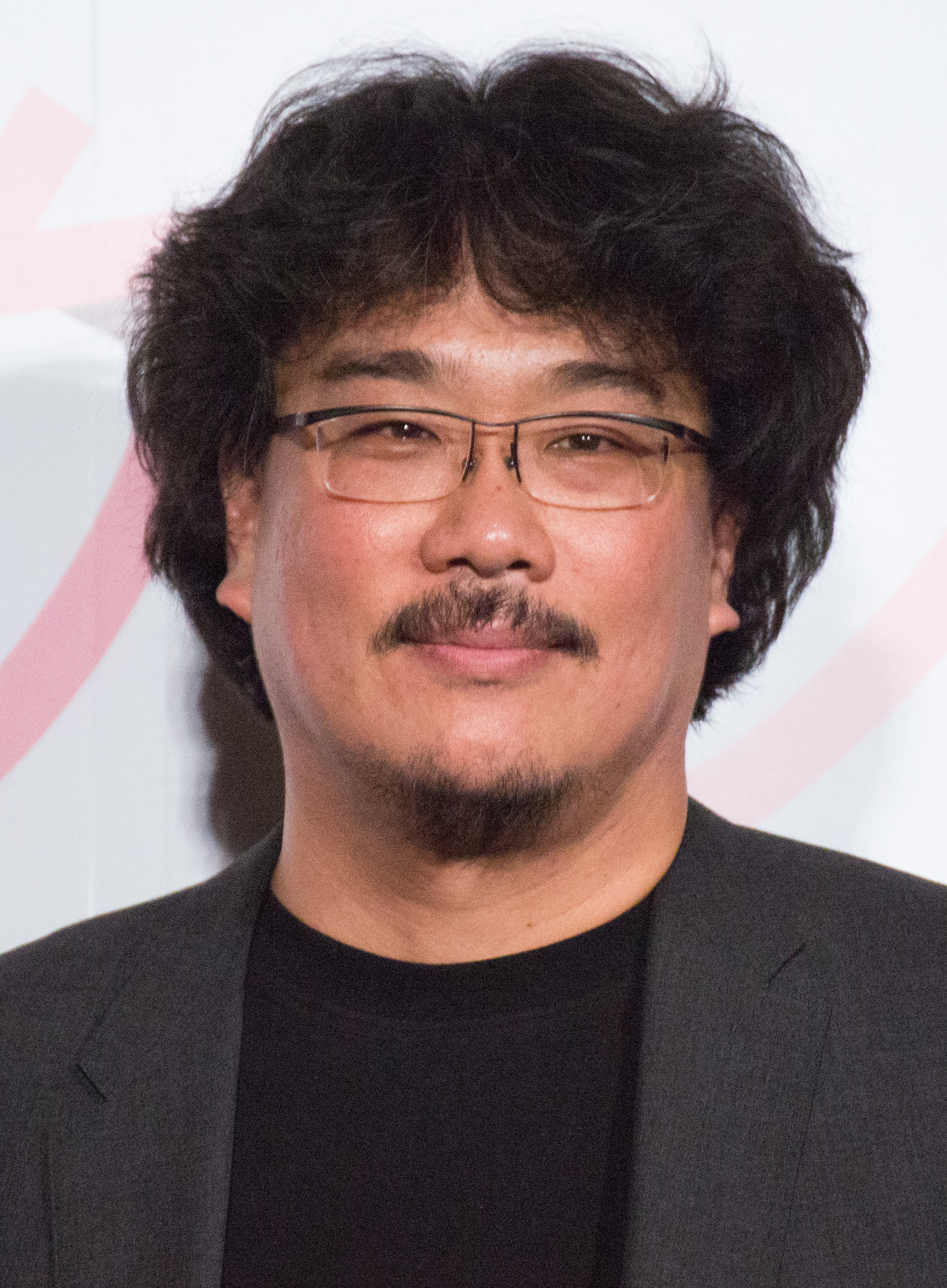
Bong Joon-ho, Grand Prize – Film winner

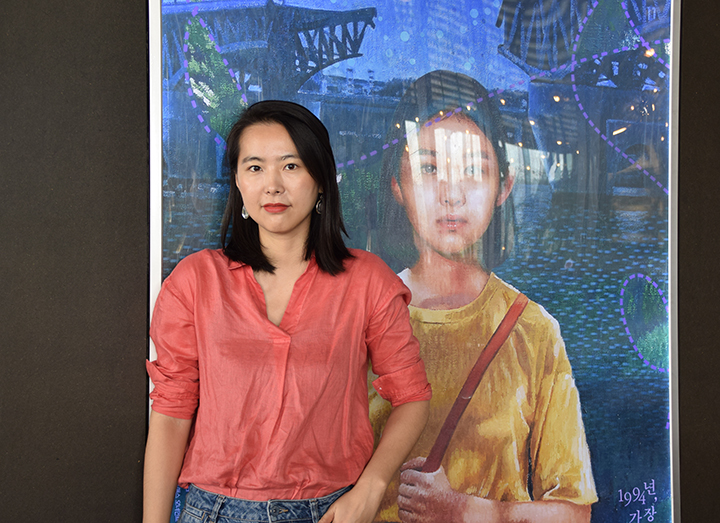
Kim Bora, Best Director – Film winner

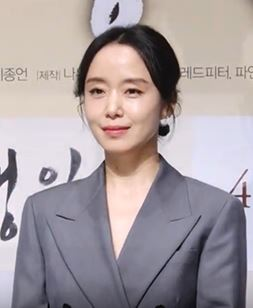
Jeon Do-yeon, Best Actress – Film winner

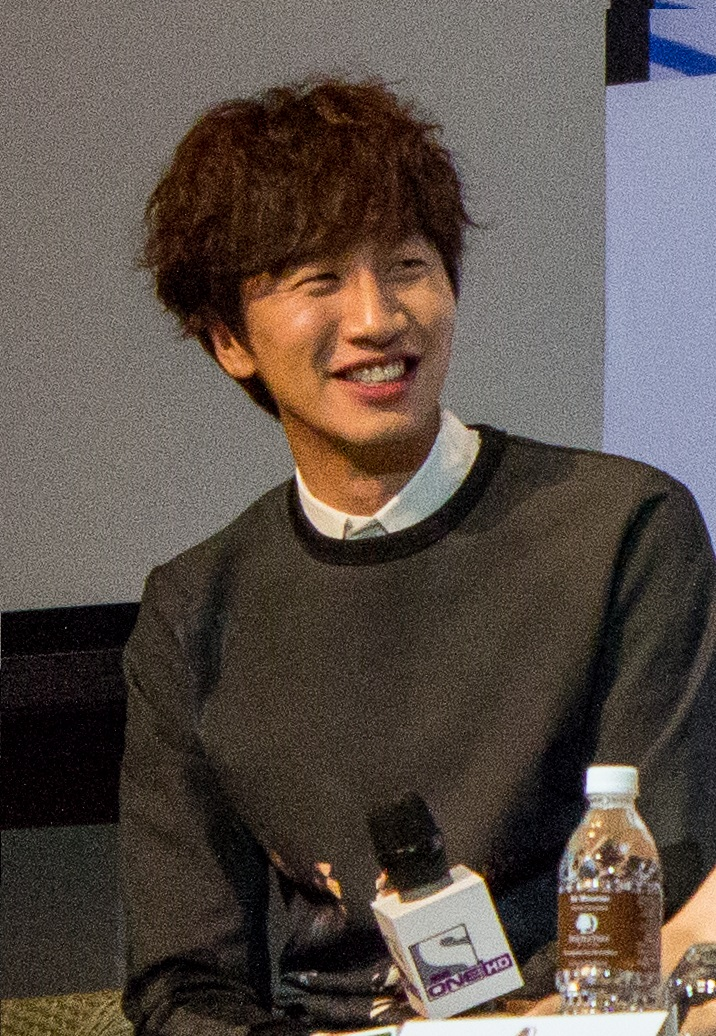
Lee Kwang-soo, Best Supporting Actor – Film winner

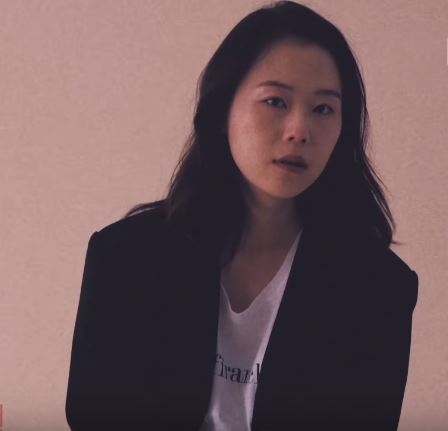
Kim Sae-byuk, Best Supporting Actress – Film winner

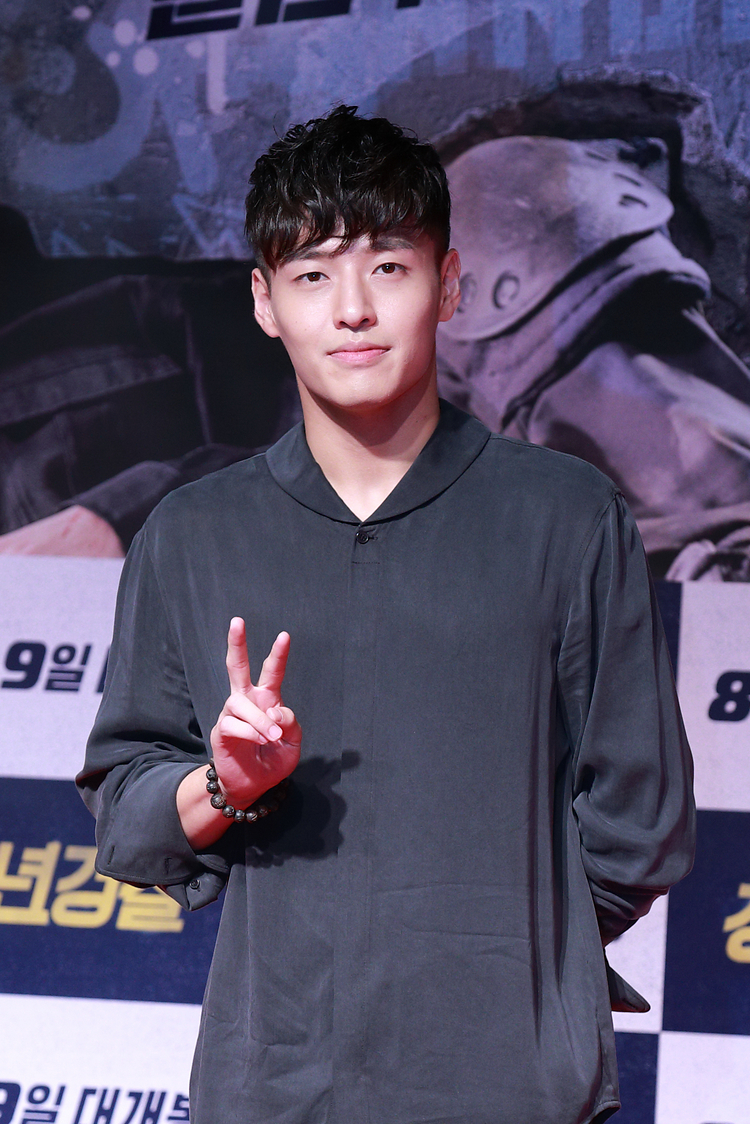
Kang Ha-neul, Best Actor – Television winner

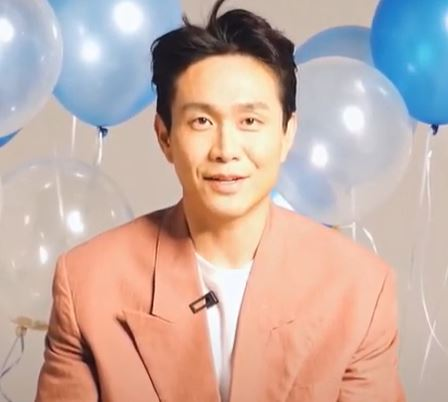
Oh Jung-se, Best Supporting Actor – Television winner

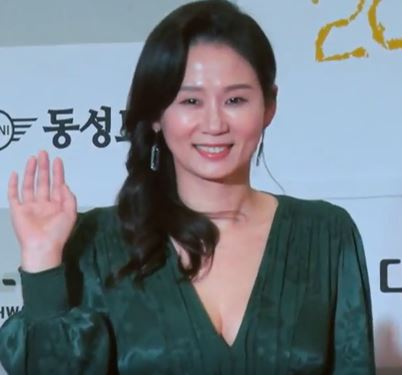
Kim Sun-young, Best Supporting Actress – Television winner

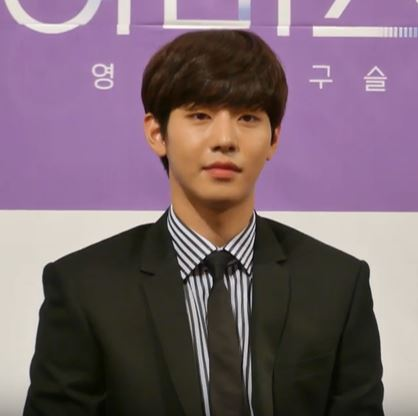
Ahn Hyo-seop, Best New Actor – Television winner

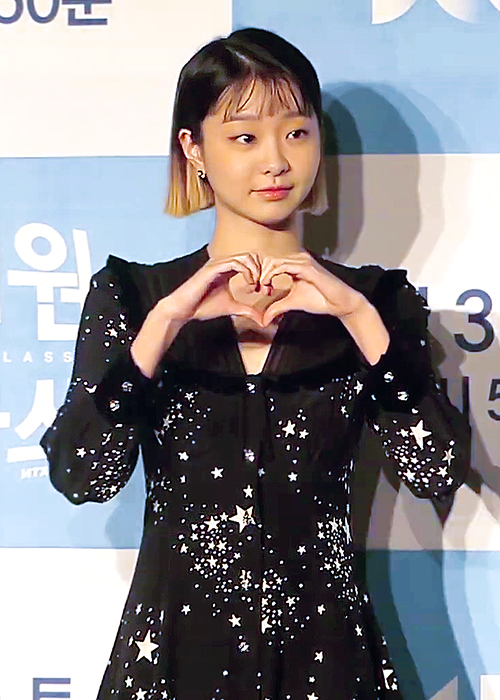
Kim Da-mi, Best New Actress – Television winner

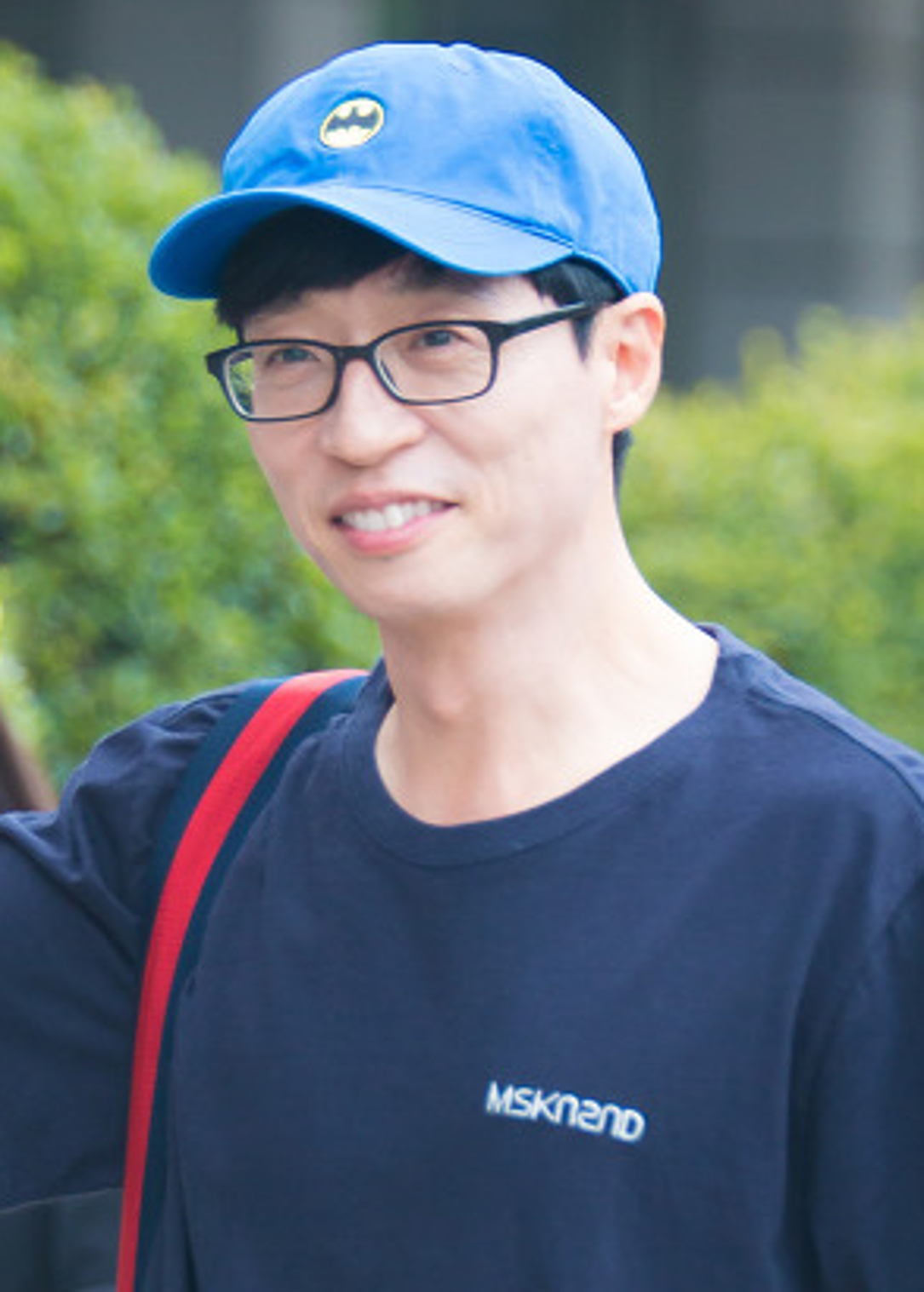
Yoo Jae-suk, Best Male Variety Performer winner

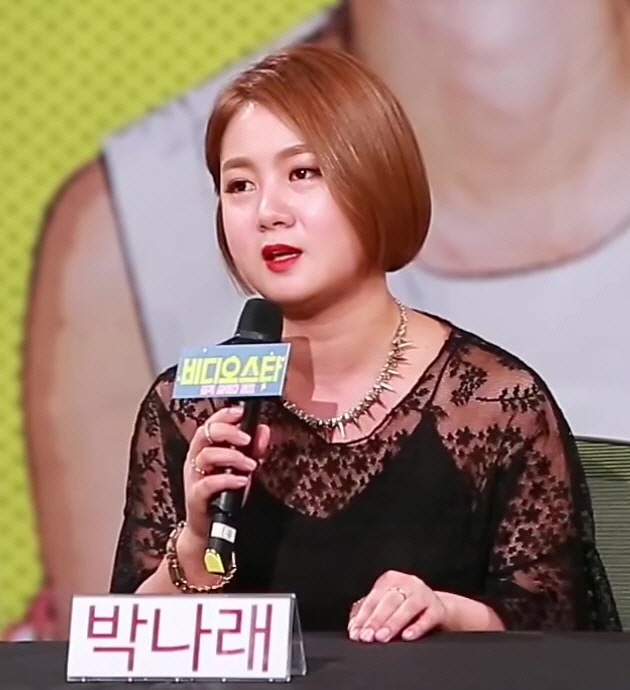
Park Na-rae, Best Female Variety Performer winner

- Winners are listed first, highlighted in **boldface**, and indicated with a double dagger (‡).
  - Nominees

=== Film ===
**Grand Prize**	**Best Film**
**Bong Joon-ho (director and co-screenwriter) – Parasite ‡**; Parasite	**Parasite ‡**; The Man Standing Next; House of Hummingbird; Exit; Kim Ji-young: Born 1982
**Best Director**	**Best New Director**
**Kim Bora – House of Hummingbird ‡**; Bong Joon-ho – Parasite; Woo Min-ho – The Man Standing Next; Lee Jong-eon – Birthday; Chung Ji-young – Black Money	**Kim Do-young – Kim Ji-young: Born 1982 ‡**; Kang Sang-woo – Kim-gun; Kim Bora – House of Hummingbird; Kim Kyoung-hee – Lucky Chan-sil; Lee Sang-geun – Exit
**Best Actor**	**Best Actress**
**Lee Byung-hun – The Man Standing Next as Kim Gyu-pyeong ‡**; Song Kang-ho – Parasite as Kim Ki-taek; Lee Je-hoon – Time to Hunt as Jun-seok; Jo Jung-suk – Exit as Lee Yong-nam; Han Suk-kyu – Forbidden Dream as King Sejong	**Jeon Do-yeon – Birthday as Park Soon-nam ‡**; Kim Hee-ae – Moonlit Winter as Yoon-hee; Kim So-jin – Another Child as Mi-hee; Jung Yu-mi – Kim Ji-young: Born 1982 as Kim Ji-young; Cho Yeo-jeong – Parasite as Choi Yeon-kyo
**Best Supporting Actor**	**Best Supporting Actress**
**Lee Kwang-soo – Inseparable Bros as Dong-goo ‡**; Kim Young-min – Lucky Chan-sil as Jang Guk-Young; Park Myung-hoon – Parasite as Oh Geun-sae; Won Hyun-joon – The Divine Move 2: The Wrathful as Shaman Jangsung; Lee Hee-joon – The Man Standing Next as Kwak Sang-cheon	**Kim Sae-byuk – House of Hummingbird as Yong-ji ‡**; Kim Guk Hee – Tune in for Love as Eun-ja; Kim Mi-kyung – Kim Ji-young: Born 1982 as Mi-sook; Park So-dam – Parasite as Kim Ki-jeong; Lee Jung-eun – Parasite as Gook Moon-gwang
**Best New Actor**	**Best New Actress**
**Park Myung-hoon – Parasite as Oh Geun-sae ‡**; Park Hae-soo – Time to Hunt as Han; Park Hyung-sik – Juror 8 as Kwon Nam-woo; Ahn Ji-ho – A Boy and Sungreen as Bo-hee; Jung Hae-in – Tune in for Love as Hyun-woo	**Kang Mal-geum – Lucky Chan-sil as Chan-sil ‡**; Kim So-hye – Moonlit Winter as Sae-bom; Kim Hye-jun – Another Child as Kwon Joo-ri; Park Ji-hu – House of Hummingbird as Kim Eun-hee; Jang Hye-jin – Parasite as Park Chung-sook
**Best Screenplay**	**Technical Award**
**Lee Sang-geun – Exit ‡**; Kim Bora – House of Hummingbird; Bong Joon-ho, Han Jin-won – Parasite; Woo Min-ho, Lee Ji-min – The Man Standing Next; Lim Dae-hyung – Moonlit Winter	**Kim Seo-hee (Makeup and Hair) – The Man Standing Next ‡**; Lee Ha-jun (Art) – Parasite; Hong Kyung-pyo (Filming) – Parasite; Kim Young-ho (Filming) – The Battle: Roar to Victory; Yun Jin-yul (Martial Arts) — Exit

==== Films with multiple awards ====
The following films received multiple awards:

Wins	Films
3	Parasite
2	House of Hummingbird
2	The Man Standing Next

==== Films with multiple nominations ====
The following films received multiple nominations:

Nominations	Films
12	Parasite
6	House of Hummingbird
6	The Man Standing Next
4	Exit
4	Kim Ji-young: Born 1982
3	Lucky Chan-sil
3	Moonlit Winter
2	Another Child
2	Birthday
2	Time to Hunt
2	Tune in for Love

=== Television ===
**Grand Prize**
**When the Camellia Blooms (drama) (KBS) ‡** Mister Trot (entertainment program) (TV Chosun); Kim Hee-ae (actress) – The World of the Married
**Best Drama**	**Best Director**
**Hot Stove League (SBS) ‡**; When the Camellia Blooms (KBS); Crash Landing on You (tvN); Kingdom 2 (Netflix); Hyena (SBS)	**Mo Wan-il – The World of the Married ‡**; Kim Seong-yoon – Itaewon Class; Lee Jung-hyo – Crash Landing on You; Cha Yeong-hoon – When the Camellia Blooms; Jeong Dong-yoon – Hot Stove League
**Best Entertainment Program**	**Best Educational Show**
**Mister Trot (TV Chosun) ‡**; Where is My Home? (MBC); Hangout with Yoo (MBC); Delicious Rendezvous (SBS); Kang's Kitchen (tvN)	**Giant Peng TV (EBS) ‡**; Documentary Insight – Archive Project Modern Korea (KBS); The Page Turners (tvN); PD Note – Prosecution Reporters (MBC); SBS Special – Yo Han Ssi Dol Hyun (SBS)
**Best Actor**	**Best Actress**
**Kang Ha-neul – When the Camellia Blooms as Hwang Yong-sik ‡**; Namkoong Min – Hot Stove League as Baek Seung-soo; Park Seo-joon – Itaewon Class as Park Sae-ro-yi; Ju Ji-hoon – Hyena as Yoon Hee-jae; Hyun Bin – Crash Landing on You as Ri Jeong-hyeok	**Kim Hee-ae – The World of the Married as Ji Sun-woo ‡**; Kim Hye-soo – Hyena as Jung Geum-ja / Jung Eun-yeong; Gong Hyo-jin – When the Camellia Blooms as Oh Dong-baek; Son Ye-jin – Crash Landing on You as Yoon Se-ri; Lee Ji-eun – Hotel del Luna as Jang Man-wol
**Best Supporting Actor**	**Best Supporting Actress**
**Oh Jung-se – When the Camellia Blooms as No Gyu-tae ‡**; Kim Young-min – The World of the Married as Son Je-hyuk; Yang Kyung-won – Crash Landing on You as Pyo Chi-su; Yoo Jae-myung – Itaewon Class as Jang Dae-hee; Jeon Seok-ho – Hyena as Ga Ki-hyuk	**Kim Sun-young – Crash Landing on You as Na Wol-sook ‡**; Kwon Nara – Itaewon Class as Oh Soo-ah; Seo Ji-hye – Crash Landing on You as Seo Dan; Son Dam-bi – When the Camellia Blooms as Choi Hyang-mi / Choi Go-eun; Yeom Hye-ran – When the Camellia Blooms as Hong Ja-young
**Best New Actor**	**Best New Actress**
**Ahn Hyo-seop – Dr. Romantic 2 as Seo Woo-jin ‡**; Kim Kang-hoon – When the Camellia Blooms as Kang Pil-gu; Ahn Bo-hyun – Itaewon Class as Jang Geun-won; Ong Seong-wu – At Eighteen as Choi Joon-woo; Lee Jae-wook – Extraordinary You as Baek Kyung	**Kim Da-mi – Itaewon Class as Jo Yi-seo ‡**; Jeon Mi-do – Hospital Playlist as Chae Song-hwa; Jeon Yeo-been – Be Melodramatic as Lee Eun-jung; Jung Ji-so – The Cursed as Baek So-jin; Han So-hee – The World of the Married as Yeo Da-kyung
**Best Male Variety Performer**	**Best Female Variety Performer**
**Yoo Jae-suk – Hangout with Yoo ‡**; Kim Sung-joo – Mister Trot; Kim Hee-chul – Knowing Bros; Moon Se-yoon – 2 Days & 1 Night season 4; Jang Sung-kyu – Movie Room	**Park Na-rae – I Live Alone ‡**; Kim Min-kyung – Tasty Guys; Ahn Young-mi – Radio Star; Jang Do-yeon – Food Bless You; Hong Hyun-hee – Wife's Taste
**Best Screenplay**	**Technical Award**
**Lim Sang-choon – When the Camellia Blooms ‡**; Kim Roo-ri – Hyena; Park Ji-eun – Crash Landing on You; Lee Shin-hwa – Hot Stove League; Lee Woo-jung – Hospital Playlist	**Jang Yeon-wook (Art) – Great Escape 3 ‡**; Kim Nam-sik, Ryu Gun-hee (VFX) – Kingdom; Kim Ji-soo (Art) – Pegasus Market; Park Sung-il (Music) – Itaewon Class; Park Si-yeon (Filming) – You Quiz on the Block

==== Television programs with multiple awards ====
The following television programs received multiple awards:

Wins	Television programs
4	When the Camellia Blooms
2	The World of the Married

==== Television programs with multiple nominations ====
The following television programs received multiple nominations:

Nominations	Television programs
10	When the Camellia Blooms
8	Crash Landing on You
7	Itaewon Class
5	Hyena
4	Hot Stove League
4	The World of the Married
2	Hospital Playlist
2	Hangout with Yoo
2	Kingdom 2
2	Mister Trot

=== Theatre ===
**Baeksang Play**	**Best Short Play**
**Shin Yoo-chung (director) – Scorched Love ‡**; Bae Yo-seob (director) – Human Fuga; Gong Joon (actor) – Human Fuga; Park Hae-sung (director) – Sputnik; Sun Myung-gyun (director) – Sputnik	**Oset Project (troupe) – Act on the Anti-Discrimination Against and Remedies for Love and Friendship ‡**; Song Yi-won (director) – Body and Land Are Just One; Kang Hoon-gu (director) – Really, Really the Last Japanese Soldier; Yoon Hye-suk (director) – We Arrived In This City Together; Jimmy Ser (music) – Scorched Love
**Best Actor**	**Best Actress**
**Baek Suk-gwang – WIFE ‡**; Kim Won-young – Act on the Anti-Discrimination Against and Remedies for Love and Friendship; Lim Young-joon – To You	**Kim Jung – Rotterdam ‡**; Kim Shin-rok – Nokcheon Has Fields of Sh*t; Lee Ri - National Highway 7; Lee Joo-young – Scorched Love; Lee Ji-hyun – This Is The Last

=== Special awards ===
Awards	Recipient
**Popularity Award (Male)**	Hyun Bin
**Popularity Award (Female)**	Son Ye-jin
**Bazaar Icon Award**	Seo Ji-hye

== Performers ==
Name(s)	Role	Performed
Kim Kang-hoon, Jung Hyeon-jun, Kim Gyu-ri, Choi Yoo-ri and Kim Jun	Performers	"Things We Took For Granted" (당연한 것들) by Lee Juck
