= A Resistance =

- Theatrical release poster
- Hangul: 항거: 유관순 이야기
- Lit.: Resistance: Yu Gwan-sun's Story
- RR: Hanggeo: Yu Gwansun iyagi
- MR: Hanggŏ: Yu Kwansun iyagi
- Directed by: Joe Min-ho
- Written by: Joe Min-ho
- Produced by: Park Hyun-tae; Shin Hye-yeun; Joe Min-ho
- Starring: Go Ah-sung; Kim Sae-byuk; Kim Ye-eun; Jeong Ha-dam; Ryu Kyung-soo
- Cinematography: Choi Sang-ho
- Edited by: Kim Sun-min; Hwang Eun-ju
- Music by: Jang Young-gyu
- Production companies: DCG Plus; Zorba Films
- Distributed by: Lotte Cultureworks
- Release date: February 27, 2019
- Running time: 105 minutes
- Country: South Korea
- Language: Korean
- Box office: US$7.8 million

A Resistance (Korean: 항거: 유관순 이야기) is a 2019 South Korean biographical period drama film directed by Cho Min-ho, starring Go Ah-sung, Kim Sae-byuk, Kim Ye-eun, Jeong Ha-dam and Ryu Kyung-soo.

== Summary ==
During the Japanese colonial period, Yu Gwan-sun, who led the March First Movement, is imprisoned. However, she does not give in and unites fellow prisoners to resist Japan. The Japanese security chief, suspicious of unrest, tricks her colleagues and uncovers Gwan-sun's role as the leader, and tortures her severely. After this, Gwan-sun pretends to obey the Japanese but secretly prepares another independence movement. This movement spreads beyond the prison and into the streets. Gwan-sun is once again subjected to merciless torture. She dies two days before her release.

== Cast ==
- Go Ah-sung as Yu Gwan-sun
- Kim Sae-byuk as Kim Hyang-hwa
- Kim Ye-eun as Kwon Ae-ra
- Jeong Ha-dam as Lee Ok-yi
- Ryu Kyung-soo as Nishida / Jung Chun-young
- Jin Ho-eun as South prisoner
- Choi Moo-sung

== Production ==
Principal photography began on October 29, 2018, and wrapped on November 30, 2018.

== Awards and nominations ==
Awards	Category	Recipient	Result	Ref.
55th Baeksang Arts Awards	Best Actress	Go Ah-sung	Nominated	
40th Blue Dragon Film Awards	Best Actress	Go Ah-sung	Nominated	
