= Kim Sae-byuk =

South Korean actress (born 1986)

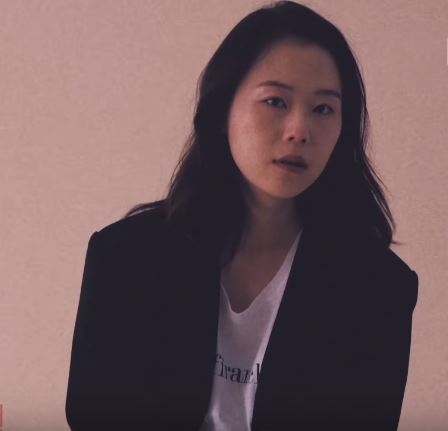
- Born: 24 October 1986 (age 40); Busan, South Korea
- Occupation: Actress
- Agent: KeyEast

Korean name
- Hangul: 김새벽
- RR: Gim Saebyeok
- MR: Kim Saebyŏk

Kim Sae-byuk (Korean: 김새벽; born 24 October 1986) is a South Korean actress.

== Filmography ==
=== Film ===
Year	Title	Role	Notes	Ref.
2008	Go Go 70s	Go-go girl		
2011	Sunny	President of class 3 grade 2 in the past		
2011	Stateless Things	Soon-hee		
2012	Romance Joe	Nurse		
2012	Deranged			
2013	Hard to Say		Short film	
2014	Manshin: Ten Thousand Spirits	Mr. Park's wife		
2014	Futureless Things	Min-hee		
2014	Tazza: The Hidden Card	North Korea female refugee		
2014	A Midsummer's Fantasia	Hye-jeong		
2014	Whistle Blower	Researcher 2		
2015	The Son Of Sun		Short film	
2016	Snow Paths	Sister Teresa (young)		
2016	Queen of Walking	Home room teacher		
2016	Birds Fly Back to the Nest		Short film	
2016	Wednesday Prayer Group	So-yeon	Short film	
2017	The Day After	Lee Chang-sook		
2017	Possible Faces	Hye-jin		
2017	The First Lap	Ji-young		
2017	The King of the Border	Yu Jin		
2018	A Blue Mouthed Face	Jin-hee		
2018	Jamsil	High school girl/Kim Yoo-young		
2018	Adulthood	Guard superintendent		
2018	House of Hummingbird	Yong-ji		
2018	A Fine Day to Walk	Sae-byuk		
2018	Grass	Ji-young		
2019	A Resistance	Kim Hyang-hwa		
2020	The Woman Who Ran	Woo-jin		
2021	In Front of Your Face			
2021	Re-Re-Project – Hana Story	Hana		
2021	A Day in the Novelist Gubo	Ji-yu		
2022	Kingmaker	Myung-sook		
2022	Sophie's World	Soo-young		
2022	Broker	Mr. Song's wife	Special appearance	

=== Television series ===
Year	Title	Role	Ref.
2009	The Splendor of Youth		
2012	KBS Drama Special: "Return Home"	Hong-yi	
2018	KBS Drama Special: "Dreamer"	Se-young	
2021	Hometown	Im Se-yoon	
2022	KBS Drama Special: "Silence of the Lambs"	Choi Hyung-won	
2024	Frankly Speaking	Chaeyeon	

== Awards and nominations ==
Year	Award	Category	Nominated work	Result
2015	24th Buil Film Awards	Best New Actress	A Midsummer's Fantasia	Nominated
2016	3rd Wildflower Film Awards	Best Actress	A Midsummer's Fantasia	Nominated
2016	52nd Baeksang Arts Awards	Best New Actress	A Midsummer's Fantasia	Nominated
2018	55th Grand Bell Awards	Best Supporting Actress	Adulthood	Nominated
2019	6th Wildflower Film Awards	Best Supporting Actress	Grass	Won
2019	28th Buil Film Awards	Best Supporting Actress	Grass	Nominated
2019	40th Blue Dragon Film Awards	Best Supporting Actress	House of Hummingbird	Nominated
2019	Malaysia Golden Global Awards	Best Supporting Actress	House of Hummingbird	Won
2019	39th Korean Association of Film Critics Awards	Best Supporting Actress	House of Hummingbird	Won
2020	56th Grand Bell Awards	Best Supporting Actress	House of Hummingbird	Nominated
2020	25th Chunsa Film Art Awards	Best Supporting Actress	House of Hummingbird	Nominated
2020	29th Buil Film Awards	Best Supporting Actress	House of Hummingbird	Nominated
2020	7th Wildflower Film Awards	Best Supporting Actress	House of Hummingbird	Nominated
2020	56th Baeksang Arts Awards	Best Supporting Actress	House of Hummingbird	Won
2022	KBS Drama Awards	Best Actress in Drama Special/TV Cinema	Silence of the Lambs	Nominated
