= Swing Kids (2018 film) =

2018 film by Kang Hyeong-cheol

- Theatrical release poster
- Hangul: 스윙키즈
- RR: Seuwingkijeu
- MR: Sŭwingk'ijŭ
- Directed by: Kang Hyeong-cheol
- Screenplay by: Kang Hyeong-cheol
- Based on: Rho Ki-soo (musical) by Jang Woo-sung
- Produced by: Lee An-na; Yoo Sung-kweon
- Starring: Doh Kyung-soo; Park Hye-su; Jared Grimes; Oh Jung-se; Kim Min-ho
- Cinematography: Kim Ji-yong
- Edited by: Nam Na-yeong
- Music by: Kim Joon-seok
- Production company: Annapurna Films
- Distributed by: Next Entertainment World
- Release date: December 19, 2018
- Running time: 133 minutes
- Country: South Korea
- Languages: Korean; English
- Budget: ₩15 billion (US$13.3 million)
- Box office: US$10.9 million

Swing Kids (Korean: 스윙키즈) is a 2018 South Korean musical drama film directed by Kang Hyeong-cheol and based on the Korean musical Roh Ki-soo. The film stars Doh Kyung-soo, Park Hye-su, Jared Grimes, Oh Jung-se and Kim Min-ho. The film was released on December 19, 2018.

Swing Kids was screened at the 1st PyeongChang International Peace Film Festival on August 18, 2019.

== Premise ==
The story takes place in Geoje prison camp during the Korean War in 1951. Ro Ki-soo, a rebellious North Korean soldier, falls in love with tap dancing after meeting Jackson, an American officer and former Broadway star who has been tasked with putting together a dance company. Kang Byung-sam auditions for the company in hopes of finding his wife, alongside Xiao Pang, a Chinese soldier and born dancer who cannot dance for more than a minute due to angina, and Yang Pan-rae, who needs money but says there's no money through dancing.

== Cast ==
- Doh Kyung-soo as Roh Ki-soo
- Park Hye-su as Yang Pan-rae
- Jared Grimes as Jackson
- Oh Jung-se as Kang Byung-sam
- Kim Min-ho as Xiao Pang
- Ross Kettle as Brigadier General Roberts
- A.J. Simmons as Jamie
- Song Jae-ryong as Sam Sik
- Lee Kyu-sung as Man-cheol
- Lee David as Kwang-gook
- Joo Hae-eun as Mae-hwa
- Lee Yool-rim as Hwang Ki-dong
- Kim Dong-geon as Ro Gi-jin
- Park Jin-joo as Linda
- Joo Hae-eun as Mae-hwa
- Park Hyung-soo as Interpreter
- Lee Dong-yong as Black marketeer
- Choi Eun-kyung as Nancy
- Lee Rang-seo as Stacy
- Lim Seo-yeong as Candy
- Kim Eun-joo as Wendy
- Park Ji-eun as Barbara
- Oh Kyeong-hwa as Julia
- Kim Min-jae as Ro Gi-jin's voice dub

== Production ==
Director Kang Hyeong-cheol is known for his hit films Scandal Makers, Sunny, and Swing Kids marks the director's return after three year from directing his hit film Tazza: The Hidden Card. Filming of Swing Kids started on October 18, 2017 and ended on February 20, 2018, in Anseong, South Korea.

== Release ==
Swing Kids was released in 23 countries including America, Canada, Australia, Singapore, Malaysia, Japan, Indonesia. The film was released in Hong Kong and Macao in January 2019.

The VIP premiere of Swing Kids was held On December 6.

=== Promotion ===
On November 12, 2018, the director and main cast of Swing Kids held a press conference where they discussed the film and answered reporters' questions. On the same day, a showcase for the film was held, where Doh Kyung-soo, Park Hye-su and Oh Jung-se performed a segment of Tap dancing along with other tap dancing professionals, and later talked about the film along with director Kang Hyeong-cheol. On November 26, the director and the cast attended a movie talk on V Live.

On December 4, the cast and director attended a media distribution preview event for the film. On December 17, The cast and directory attended an event called "Chewing Chat" at Lotte Cinema World Tower, and also held a stage greeting in the same place. On December 18, Doh Kyung-soo, Park Hye-su and Oh Jung-se went on the radio show Cultwo Show were the talked about the movie, and later held another stage greeting at CGV Yongsan I-Park Mall.

== Reception ==
=== Critical response ===
On review aggregator Rotten Tomatoes, the film holds an approval rating of 63% based on eight reviews, with an average rating of 6.3/10.

The film received mixed reviews from critics. Praise was given to the film's production design and music, with criticisms directing towards the long running time and the structure of the film. Guy Lodge from Variety, wrote about the film: "Too often, it simply feels like two films wrestling in one roomy framework, sometimes overlapping to awkward effect".

Park Boram from Yonhap News Agency, wrote: "The film's booming tapping sounds set against the film's throwback soundtrack -- which includes David Bowie's "Modern Love," Benny Goodman's "Sing Sing Sing," The Beatles' "Free as a Bird," as well as Korean veteran singer Jung Su-ra's popular 1988 song "Joy"—drive colorful vibrancy into the film, making the audience twitch with amusement throughout the film's 133-minute running time.", Park also added that the "musicality and a Christmas scene close to the end make the production a perfect film choice for the holiday season."

The film was ranked No.3 by Pierce Conran from Modern Korean Cinema in Top 15 Korean Films of 2018. Conran wrote: "Swing Kids was without a doubt the best theatrical experience I had all year. Infectiously rhythmic, this Korean War POW camp tap dance extravaganza will have you yearning for old-school Hollywood showmanship and begging for more when the curtain falls."

=== Box office ===
Prior to its release, Swing Kids ranked first in the pre-sales, with 70,256 viewers and 21.6% reservation rate. The film ranked second place on Korean theaters among Korean movies, since its release. On December 25, Swing Kids began its seat sales and ranked first in the box office, surpassing Aquaman and The Drug King by 32% and 56% respectively. On December 27, Swing Kids attracted more than 1 million viewers.

In the United States it made $222,001, South Korea $10,672,098, Australia $17,141, and in New Zealand $2,157.

== Soundtrack ==
Side A
No.	Title	Artist	Length
1.	"Caldonia"	Louis Jordan	2:40
2.	"If I Knew You Were Comin' I'd've Baked a Cake"	Eileen Barton	2:37
3.	"Shout"	The Isley Brothers	2:15
4.	"Hava Nagila" (하바나길라)	Rita Kim	3:26
5.	"Joy" (환희)	Jung Su-ra	4:43

Side B
No.	Title	Artist	Length
1.	"Prelude and Fugue in C major, BWV 846" (평균율 1권 1번 다장조)	Bach
2.	"Modern Love"	David Bowie	3:56
3.	"The Christmas Song"	European Jazz Trio	4:02
4.	"Sing Sing Sing"	Benny Goodman	5:23
5.	"Free as a Bird"	The Beatles	4:58

== Awards and nominations ==
Year	Award	Category	Recipient	Result	Ref.
2018	19th Golden Trailer Awards	Best Foreign Holiday Trailer Award	Swing Kids	Won	
2019	55th Baeksang Arts Awards	Best Director	Kang Hyeong-cheol	Won	
2019	55th Baeksang Arts Awards	Best New Actor	Kim Min-ho	Nominated	
2019	55th Baeksang Arts Awards	Technical Award	Kim Jun-seok (Music)	Nominated	
2019	39th Golden Cinema Film Festival	Best New Actress	Park Hye-su	Won	
2019	28th Buil Film Awards	Best New Actress	Park Hye-su	Nominated	
2019	28th Buil Film Awards	Popular Star Award	Doh Kyung-soo	Won	
2019	39th Korean Association of Film Critics Awards	Best Soundtrack	Kim Jun-seok	Won	
2019	40th Blue Dragon Film Awards	Best New Actress	Park Hye-su	Nominated	
2019	40th Blue Dragon Film Awards	Best Film	Swing Kids	Nominated	
2019	40th Blue Dragon Film Awards	Best Director	Kang Hyeong-cheol	Nominated	
2019	40th Blue Dragon Film Awards	Best Cinematography-Lighting	Kim Ji-young, Jo Gyu-young	Won	
2019	40th Blue Dragon Film Awards	Best Editing	Nam Na-yeong	Won	
2019	40th Blue Dragon Film Awards	Best Art Direction	Park Il-hyun	Nominated	
2019	40th Blue Dragon Film Awards	Technical Award	Im Seung-hui, Gwon Yu-jin (Costumes)	Nominated	
2019	40th Blue Dragon Film Awards	Best Music	Kim Jun-seok	Nominated	
2020	56th Grand Bell Awards	Best Music	Kim Jun-seok	Nominated	
2020	56th Grand Bell Awards	Best costume Design	Kwon Yujin	Nominated	
