= The Battle: Roar to Victory =

2019 South Korean-Japanese film

- Theatrical release poster
- Hangul: 봉오동 전투
- Hanja: 鳳梧洞戰鬪
- Lit.: Battle of Bongo-dong
- RR: Bongodong jeontu
- MR: Pongodong chŏnt'u
- Directed by: Won Shin-yun
- Written by: Cheon Jin-woo
- Produced by: Won Shin-yun; Kim Han-min
- Starring: Yoo Hae-jin; Ryu Jun-yeol; Jo Woo-jin
- Cinematography: Kim Young-ho
- Edited by: Yang Jin-mo
- Music by: Jang Young-gyu
- Production companies: Showbox Corp; Big Stone Pictures; W-Pictures
- Release date: August 7, 2019
- Running time: 134 minutes
- Country: South Korea
- Languages: Korean; Japanese; Chinese
- Box office: US$34.8 million

The Battle: Roar to Victory (Korean: 봉오동 전투) is a 2019 South Korean period war drama film, revolving around the Battle of Fengwudong between Korean independence militias and Japanese forces in 1920 during the Japanese occupation of Korea.

== Plot ==
After the March First Movement in 1919, the armed struggle of the independence forces became active in the Bongo-dong area. Armed with new weapons, Japan begins an operation to subdue the independence forces, and the independence forces decide to use the topography of Bongo-dong to overcome the unfavorable situation.

In 1920, when Korea was under Japanese rule, the Korean independence forces' sword-wielding Hwang Hae-cheol (Yoo Hae-jin) and his subordinates such as sniper Byeong-gu (Jo Woo-jin) carried out the operation to deliver funds to the Korean Provisional Government in Shanghai. During the operation Hwang Hae-chul is reunited with Jang-ha (Ryu Jun-yeol), a young squad commander, who has a suicide mission to bait the Japanese forces led by a general (Kazuki Kitamura) and first lieutenant (Hiroyuki Ikeuchi) into Bongo-dong.

== Cast ==
- Yoo Hae-jin as Hwang Hae-cheol (Korean: 황해철, Hwang Hae-cheol)
- Ryu Jun-yeol as Yi Jang-ha (Korean: 이장하, I Jang-ha)
- Jo Woo-jin as Byeong-gu (Korean: 병구, Byeong-gu)
- Kazuki Kitamura as Japanese general Yasukawa Jiro (Japanese: 陸軍大将安川次郎, Rikugun-Taishō Yasukawa Jirō)
- Hiroyuki Ikeuchi as Japanese first lieutenant Kusanagi (Japanese: 陸軍中尉草薙, Rikugun-Chūi Kusanagi)
- Kotaro Daigo as Yukio
- Go Min-si as Hwa-ja (Jang-ha's sister)
- Park Ji-hwan as Japanese lieutenant Shigeru Arayoshi (Japanese: 陸軍中尉荒吉茂, Rikugun-Chūi Arayoshi Shigeru)
- Shim So-young as Chinese Shaman
- Sung Yu-bin as Gae Ddong-yi
- Park Hoon as a member of Jang Ha's unit
- Park Hee-soon as captured independence soldier (special appearance)

== Reception ==
The film had brought a cumulative total of more than 3 million viewers to Korean theaters according to the film's distributor Showbox. It premiered in New York on 16 August 2019.

== Awards and nominations ==
| Year | Award | Category | Recipient | Result | Ref. |
|---|---|---|---|---|---|
| 2019 | 27th Korean Culture and Entertainment Awards | Grand Prize in a Film | The Battle: Roar to Victory | Won | |
| 2019 | 27th Korean Culture and Entertainment Awards | Best Director in a Film | Won Shin-yun | Won | |
| 2020 | 56th Grand Bell Awards | Best Cinematography | Kim Young-ho | Won | |
| 2020 | 56th Grand Bell Awards | Best Lighting | Hwang Sun-ok | Nominated | |
| 2020 | 56th Grand Bell Awards | Technical Award (Special Effects) | Jung Do-ahn | Nominated | |
| 2020 | 25th Chunsa Film Art Awards | Best Director | Won Shin-yun | Won | |
| 2020 | 25th Chunsa Film Art Awards | Technical Award | Kim Young-ho | Won | |
