= List of Stranger characters =

This is a list of characters of the South Korean television series Stranger.

== Cast overview ==
= Main cast (credited)
= Recurring cast (3+)
= Guest cast (1-2)

Character	Portrayed by	Season	
Character	Portrayed by	Season 1 (2017)	Season 2 (2020)
Main
Hwang Si-mok	Cho Seung-woo^{1}	Main	Main
Han Yeo-jin	Bae Doona	Main	Main
Seo Dong-jae	Lee Joon-hyuk	Main	Main
Lee Chang-joon	Yoo Jae-myung	Main	Guest
Young Eun-soo	Shin Hye-sun	Main	Guest
Lee Yeon-jae	Yoon Se-ah	Recurring	Main
Choi Bit	Jeon Hye-jin		Main
Woo Tae-ha	Choi Moo-sung		Main
Recurring
Jang Geon	Choi Jae-woong	Recurring	Recurring
Kang Won-chul	Park Sung-geun	Recurring	Recurring
Park Soon-chang	Song Ji-ho	Recurring	Recurring
Choi Yoon-soo	Jeon Bae-soo	Recurring	Recurring
Seo Sang-won	Yoon Jong-in	Recurring	Recurring
Yoon Se-won	Lee Kyu-hyung	Recurring	Guest
Lee Yoon-beom	Lee Geung-young	Recurring	Mentioned
Kim Ho-sub	Lee Tae-hyung	Recurring	Guest
Choi Young	Kim So-ra	Recurring	Mentioned
Young Il-jae	Lee Ho-jae	Recurring	
Kim Woo-gyoon	Choi Byung-mo	Recurring	
Kim Soo-chan	Park Jin-woo	Recurring	
Kim Jung-bon	Seo Dong-won^{2}	Recurring	
Kwon Min-ah / Kim Ga-young	Park Yoo-na	Recurring	
Park Kyung-wan	Jang Sung-bum	Recurring	Mentioned
Woo Byung-joon	Jung Dong-geun	Recurring	
Kim Sa-hyun	Kim Young-jae		Recurring
Kim Ah-hyun	Yoon Seul		Recurring
Lim Jung-gyu	Lim Chul-soo		Recurring
Kim Young-sik	Kim Ji-hoon		Recurring
Jung Min-ha	Park Ji-yeon		Recurring
Managing Director Park	Jung Sung-il		Recurring
Oh Joo-sun	Kim Hak-sun		Recurring
Shin Jae-yong	Lee Hae-young		Recurring
Kim Myung-han	Ha Sung-kwang		Recurring
Baek Joong-gi	Jung Seung-gil		Recurring
Lee Dae-sung	Park Sung-il		Recurring
Goo Joon-sung	Bae Je-ki		Recurring
Oh Byung-gun	Kwon Hyuk-bum		Recurring
Kim Soo-hang	Kim Bum-soo		Recurring
Song Gi-hyun	Lee Ga-sub		Recurring
Lee Yoo-an	Choi Hee-seo		Recurring
Kim Hu-jung	Kim Dong-hwi		Recurring

- ^1 Gil Jung-woo and Song Eui-joon portray a young Hwang Si-mok in flashback scenes.
- ^2 Kim Jin-seong portrays a young Kim Jung-bon in flashback scenes.

== Main characters ==
=== Hwang Si-mok ===
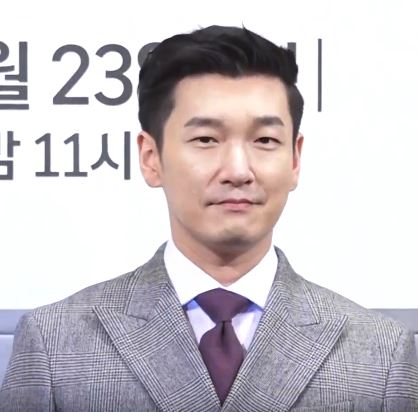
Cho Seung-woo plays Hwang Si-mok

Hwang Si-mok (Cho Seung-woo) is a prosecutor who works in the 3rd Division of Seoul Western District Prosecutors' Office at the beginning of the first season. He was born in 1983 and is 35 years old at the beginning of the series. When he was 14, he underwent a lobotomy for his recurring intense migraines, which he suffered from due to hypersensitivity to certain frequencies of sound. After his operation, he lost his sense of empathy and lacks social skills, but he feels guilty for his parents' divorce and his mother's suicide attempt. He appears cold to people but his good memory and analytical mind are an asset when he works on cases. His working methods include reenacting crime scenes and reasoning in narrations that the audience can hear.

While working on the murder case of Park Moo-sung, a businessman who appears to offer illegal services to prosecutors and political figures, Si-mok is tasked with leading the Special Investigations Task Force. After exposing corruption within the prosecution, he is sent to the Tongyeong branch.

Two years later, at the beginning of the second season, Si-mok is appointed to the Criminal Legislation Division at the Supreme Prosecutors' Office in Seoul and is asked to join the Investigative Procedure Reformation Council. Along with Woo Tae-ha and Kim Sa-hyun, Si-mok represents the interest of the prosecutors. He is tasked with bringing arguments forward to keep the investigation right within the prosecution and away from the police, who try to obtain the authority to initiate and terminate crime investigation without approval from the prosecution's office. After discovering and revealing the truth about Park Gwang-soo's death, he is transferred to the Wonju branch where he was originally supposed to relocate to after his term at Tonyeong ended.

Si-mok slowly starts showing emotions throughout the seasons. During the first season, he can be seen smiling on a few occasions while talking to Han Yeo-jin, and goes as far as expressing his anger in the second season while working on Seo Dong-jae's kidnapping case.

=== Han Yeo-jin ===
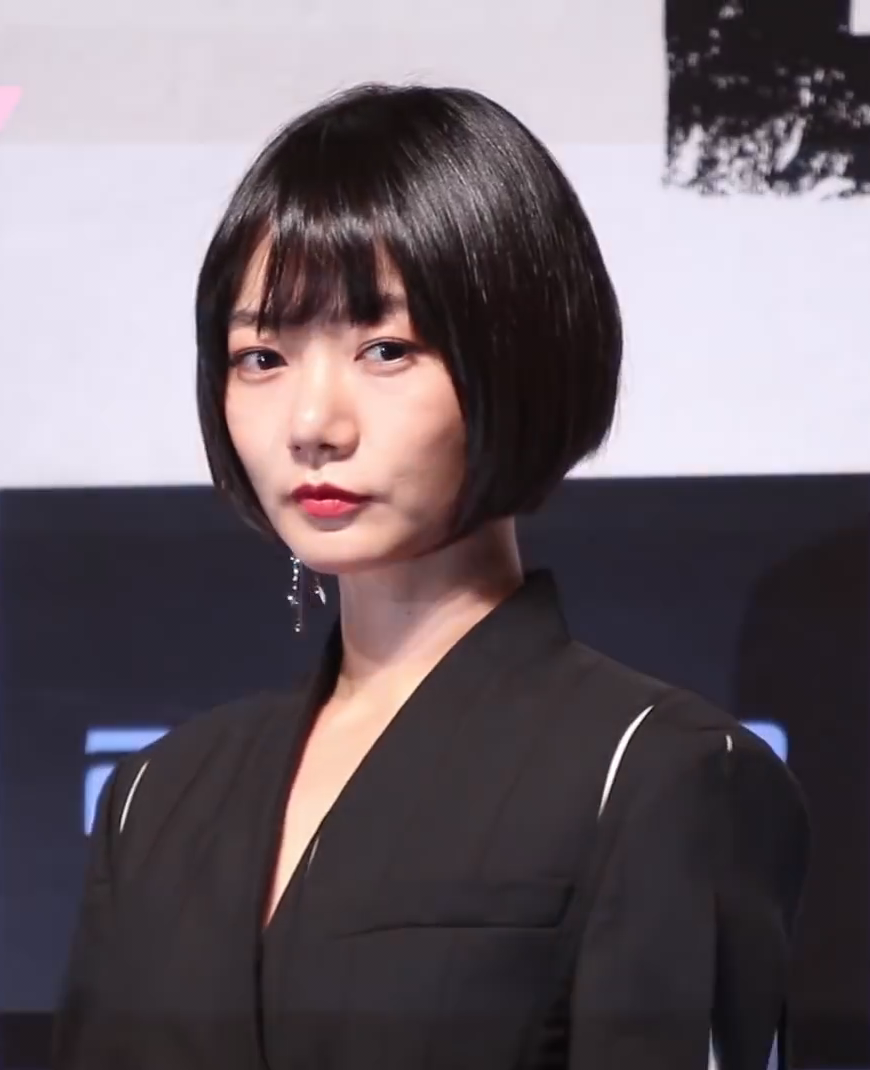
Bae Doona plays Han Yeo-jin

Han Yeo-jin (Bae Doona) is a homicide lieutenant and later Senior Inspector at Yongsan Police Station. She is 30 years old at the beginning of the first season. After she graduated from the Korean National Police University, she worked two years within a precinct station. She then transferred to Yongsan Police Station where she worked for two years as a traffic officer before joining Homicide Team 3.

She first meets Hwang Si-mok at the crime scene of Park Moo-sung, a failed businessman who bribed prosecutors and police officers. Throughout the season, they work closely together on the case and she eventually joins him as a member of the Special Investigations Task Force. Through their collaborations, Si-mok sometimes starts showing emotions to her. At the end of the season, she is promoted to Senior Inspector for successfully catching Eun-soo's murderer in Taiwan.

In the second season, Yeo-jin is dispatched to the National Police Agency but remains affiliated with Yongsan Police Station. She does not feel at ease working in an office and often appears to miss field work. She becomes part of the Investigative Procedure Reformation Council with Jang Geon, who she recommends after being tasked to find a new member with specific qualifications. Throughout the season, Yeo-jin is torn between her principles and her allegiance to her direct superior Choi Bit, but usually decides to obey her orders out of respect for her. After revealing the involvement of Choi Bit in moving of Park Gwang-soo's body, the innovation team is disbanded. Yeo-jin becomes victim of workplace intimidation from her colleagues, who consider her a traitor for blowing the whistle on Choi Bit. Although having a hard time, she rejects the offer to re-join Yongsan Police Station and decides to join another branch of the Intelligence Bureau. There she again receives the cold shoulder from her colleagues until Director Noh, her new superior, gives her a warm welcome. He tells her that he looks forward working with her as he heard good stories about her from Choi Bit.

=== Seo Dong-jae ===
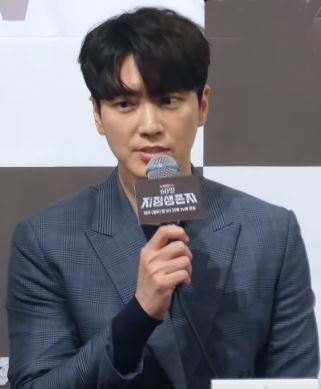
Lee Joon-hyuk plays Seo Dong-jae

Seo Dong-jae (Lee Joon-hyuk) is one of Hwang Si-mok's colleagues at the Seoul Western District Prosecutors' Office. Dong-jae is married to Lee Yoo-an with whom he has two sons. He studied law at a local university after being granted a full scholarship. After graduation, he became a prosecutor but quickly realized that he would only be able to be promoted to a certain level as he is not a SKY alumni, which causes him to develop a sense of inferiority. He started taking bribes and pleases his superiors whenever he can.

In the first season, he briefly works at the Blue House when Lee Chang-joon, to whom he looks up to, is appointed as Chief Secretary, but he eventually returns to the Prosecutors' Office. He is involved in the corruption case surrounding Park Moo-sung but Hwang Si-mok gives him a second chance after Lee Chang-joon's death.

In the second season, Dong-jae is relocated to the Prosecutors' Office of Uijeongbu where he takes a particular interest in cases involving the mysterious deaths of lawyer Park Gwang-soo and police officer Song Gi-hyun, because he thinks they might contain compromising evidence on Choi Bit. He approaches Woo Tae-ha with these two cases, hoping that it will be of use to him during the Investigative Procedure Reformation Council meetings. On one evening, whilst on his way to meet Woo Tae-ha, he is kidnapped. Si-mok and Yeo-jin eventually discover that Kim Hu-jung, the sole survivor of the Tongyeong drowning case, held Dong-jae captive and rescue him. While still unconscious in hospital, Dong-jae is visited by Lee Yeon-jae who threatens him to keep his mouth shut. After he wakes up, Dong-jae is being interrogated by the prosecution as a witness. He is asked about Hanjo Group's involvement with Park Gwang-soo but the scene ends before his answer is known to the audience.

=== Lee Chang-joon ===
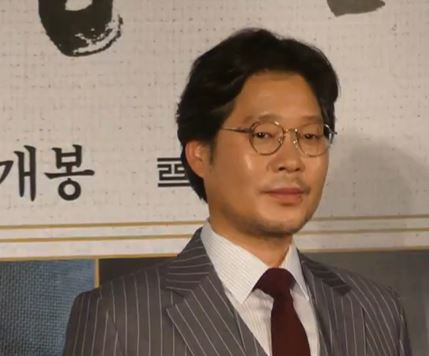
Yoo Jae-myung plays Lee Chang-joon

Lee Chang-joon (Yoo Jae-myung) is the Chief Prosecutor at Seoul Western District Prosecutors' Office and is later appointed as the Chief Secretary at the Blue House. Chang-joon was born on November 10, 1971, and is married to Lee Yeon-jae, the daughter of Hanjo Group's chairman. He graduated as member of the 25th Class at the Judicial Research And Training Institute; his contemporaries include Kang Won-chul, Oh Joo-sun and Park Gwang-soo. He is described as a righteous person and is mentor to Hwang Si-mok and Seo Dong-jae, but gets absorbed in the web of corruption by taking care of his father-in-law's dishonest business.

At the end of the first season, he commits suicide in front of Hwang Si-mok, as Chang-joon told him that he would never stand trial. It is consequently revealed that Chang-joon is the one who created the "forest of secrets" as he leaves behind a letter and a bag with proof of Hanjo Group's corruption, which involves several political figures.

Chang-joon's narration on a dark screen launches the second season. The same monologue can be heard again towards the end of the last episode, while Hwang Si-mok is driving to his new office in Wonju. Chang-joon briefly appears in the last episode of the season in Si-mok's dream, along with Yoon Se-won, Kang Won-chul and Young Eun-soo. They are laughing together and Seo Dong-jae, still in a coma at the time, wants to join them before Chang-joon gives him the stop sign. The group then walks away, leaving Dong-jae and Si-mok as the last men standing.

Yoo Jae-myung's performance was praised after the first season came to an end and it is seen as one of the reasons why Stranger became successful. The actor mentioned that he chose to play Lee Chang-joon because he "was a villain worth learning about, and the setting itself was interesting in addition to the drama's own attraction."

=== Young Eun-soo ===
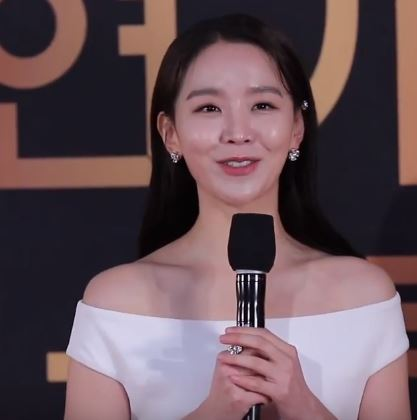
Shin Hye-sun plays Young Eun-soo

Young Eun-soo (Shin Hye-sun) is one of Hwang Si-mok's colleagues at the Seoul Western District Prosecutors' Office. She was born on July 11, 1991. Her father used to be the Minister of Justice but was wrongly accused of corruption. Eun-soo blames Lee Chang-joon for her father's career downfall. She keeps working in hopes of clearing her father's name.

Eun-soo is the first one to suspect that Yoon Se-won is involved in Park Moo-sung's death, after seeing his tattoo while the Special Investigations Task Force was gathered in Han Yeo-jin's apartment. Towards the end of the first season, she is found dead in Kwon Min-ah's apartment. She called Hwang Si-mok earlier that day but he had something more important to do. Her murderer, revealed to be Lee Yoon-beom's right-hand man Woo Byung-joon, is eventually caught in Taiwan.

She briefly appears in the last episode of the second season in Hwang Si-mok's dream, along with Lee Chang-joon, Yoon Se-won and Kang Won-chul. They are laughing together before walking away; she turns back one last time to look at Si-mok, but then leaves for good.

Shin Hye-sun chose to play Eun-soo because she was "appealing [though] she was a very unfortunate character." After the conclusion of the first season, the actress said that "she feel[s] heartache when [she] think[s] about [Eun-soo]. [She] didn't feel that way while [they] were making it but watching the drama afterwards made [her] feel that way. [Eun-soo] couldn't enjoy the things in life and she never got a night's sleep peacefully because of her father. She only worked on recovering her dad's honor and that hurt to see."

=== Lee Yeon-jae ===
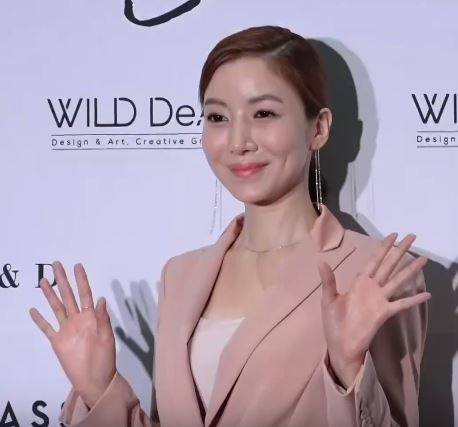
Yoon Se-ah plays Lee Yeon-jae

Lee Yeon-jae (Yoon Se-ah) is the daughter of Hanjo Group's chairman, Lee Yoon-beom. She was born in 1979 and is married to Lee Chang-joon, with whom she has a daughter. It was widely believed that she married Lee Chang-joon for political reasons but it is later revealed that she broke a pre-arranged marriage with Kim Byung-hyun (the CEO of Sungmoon Daily newspaper) in order to marry Chang-joon.

In the first season, she is not initially involved in the family business, but she takes over her father's role after he loses his position due to tax evasion.

In the second season, she is fighting a bitter battle with her half-brother Lee Sung-jae over the management rights of Hanjo Group. Following in her father's footsteps, she uses dishonest practices to get what she wants. At the end of the season, Kang Won-chul warns her that this is not what her late husband wanted and pleads with her not to hurt his juniors Hwang Si-mok and Seo Dong-jae. His words seem to affect her but she still visits an unconscious Dong-jae at hospital and threatens him.

She transitions from a recurring character in season 1 to a main character in season 2.

=== Choi Bit ===
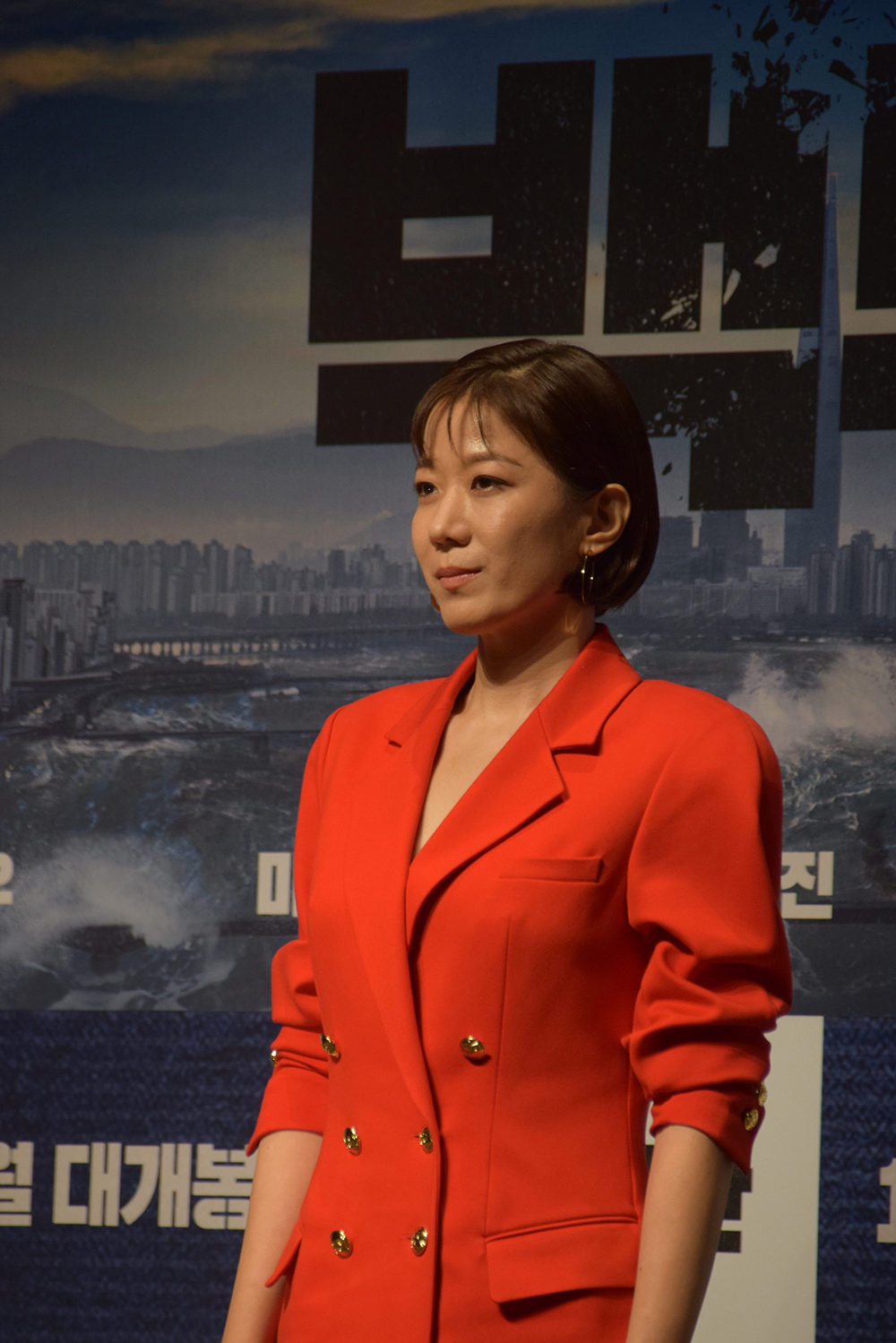
Jeon Hye-jin plays Choi Bit

Choi Bit (Jeon Hye-jin) is the first woman to become Chief of the Intelligence Bureau and former head of Namyangju Police Station. She was born on November 20, 1974, and married an office worker, with whom she has two children (born in 2006 and 2009). She is Han Yeo-jin's direct superior at the National Police Agency and fellow alumni of the Korean National Police University. She represents the interest of the police on the Investigative Procedure Reformation Council.

During the second season, it is hinted that Choi Bit and Woo Tae-ha are hiding a secret which is eventually discovered in the penultimate episode: she was the one who helped Tae-ha move Park Gwang-soo's body after her superior sent her to the vacation villa to clean up. Her involvement in covering up the circumstances in which Gwang-soo died, granted Bit a promotion to the Intelligence Bureau where she works with Yeo-jin. Bit is very protective of her and does not blame Yeo-jin for blowing the whistle on the Park Gwang-soo case. She eventually resigns from the police, after Hwang Si-mok convinces her to reveal the truth on Park Gwang-soo's death in order to protect Yeo-jin, who Tae-ha threatens to destroy.

She first appears in season 2.

=== Woo Tae-ha ===
Woo Tae-ha (Choi Moo-sung) is the Chief of the Criminal Legislation Division at the Supreme Prosecutors' Office. He was born in 1971 and is part of the Investigative Procedure Reformation Council. Tae-ha graduated as member of the 28th Class at the Judicial Research And Training Institute; his contemporaries include Kim Sa-hyun.

At the beginning of the second season, he recruits Hwang Si-mok to help him protect the prosecutors' investigation rights from the police. After the kidnapping of Seo Dong-jae, Tae-ha plants a fake witness and a cryptic letter to mislead the investigators into thinking that a police officer is the culprit. This compromises the reputation of the police with the general public.

He is very grateful to Choi Bit, who helped him cover up the mysterious death of Park Gwang-soo. This eventually comes to light after the works of Seo Dong-jae, Hwang Si-mok and Han Yeo-jin. Tae-ha immediately prepares a statement denying all charges but Choi Bit decides to come clean and confirms that she helped him move Gwang-soo's body. He is eventually investigated and indicted by the prosecution.

He first appears in season 2.

== Recurring characters ==
The characters below are listed in alphabetical order. Following the Korean naming convention, the family name comes before the given name.

- Choi Yoon-soo (Jeon Bae-soo) is a Captain at Yongsan Police Station.
- Jang Geon (Choi Jae-woong) is a sergeant and later lieutenant at Yongsan Police Station. He was part of the Special Investigations Task Force in the first season and of the Investigative Procedure Reformation Council in the second season.
- Kang Won-chul (Park Sung-geun) is the Chief Prosecutor at Seoul Eastern District Prosecutors' Office and former Chief Prosecutor at Seoul Western District Prosecutors' Office. He graduated as member of the 25th Class at the Judicial Research And Training Institute and is a mentor to Hwang Si-mok and Seo Dong-jae.
- Park Soon-chang (Song Ji-ho) is a rookie detective who joins Han Yeo-jin's team at the beginning of the first season.
- Seo Sang-won (Yoon Jong-in) is a detective who often disagrees with Han Yeo-jin.

=== Season 1 ===
- Choi Young (Kim So-ra) is Hwang Si-mok's assisting officer. She was part of the Special Investigations Task Force. Towards the end of the first season, she serves as bait pretending to be Kim Ga-young in order to catch Kim Woo-gyoon. At the end of the second season, her former colleague Kim Ho-sub reveals that she went back to her hometown, in Hwasun County.
- Kim Ho-sub (Lee Tae-hyung) is Hwang Si-mok's investigator. He was part of the Special Investigations Task Force. In the first season, he is briefly suspected by Hwang Si-mok to be receiving bribes from Seo Dong-jae, but Si-mok tests him and eventually trusts him again. In the last episode of the second season, he makes a special appearance: he appears to be working next door to Si-mok at the Wonju branch.
- Kim Jung-bon (Seo Dong-won) is a human rights lawyer and Hwang Si-mok's childhood classmate. He was part of the Special Investigations Task Force.
- Kim Soo-chan (Park Jin-woo) is a lieutenant at Yongsan Police Station.
- Kim Woo-gyoon (Choi Byung-mo) is the Chief of Yongsan Police Station. At the end of the season, he is sentenced to three years and six months in prison for having relations with a minor and attempting kidnapping.
- Kwon Min-ah / Kim Ga-young (Park Yoo-na) is a female escort who becomes a key witness.
- Lee Yoon-beom (Lee Geung-young) is the Chairman of Hanjo Group and Lee Chang-joon's father-in-law.
- Park Kyung-wan (Jang Sung-bum) is Park Moo-sung's son. He was serving in the military when his father was murdered.
- Woo Byung-joon (Jung Dong-geun) is the Director of Hanjo Group and Lee Yoon-beom's right-hand man. He murdered Young Eun-soo.
- Yoon Se-won (Lee Kyu-hyung) is a prosecutor at Seoul Western District Prosecutors' Office who was part of the Special Investigations Task Force.
- Young Il-jae (Lee Ho-jae) is Eun-soo's father and a former Prosecutor and Minister of Justice. He lost his position after being wrongfully accused of corruption. He asked Hwang Si-mok to take his daughter under his wing, a promise Si-mok could not keep.

=== Season 2 ===
- Baek Joong-gi (Jung Seung-gil) is a captain at Segok Police Station. He was involved in a corruption case which led to the suicide of one of his subordinates after he allowed his team to bully him.
- Goo Joon-sung (Bae Je-ki) is an officer at Segok Police Station.
- Jung Min-ha (Park Ji-yeon) is one of Seo Dong-jae's colleagues at the Prosecutors' Office of Uijeongbu.
- Kim Ah-hyun (Yoon Seul) is an assisting officer at the Criminal Legislation Division at the Supreme Prosecutors' Office.
- Kim Hu-jung (Kim Dong-hwi) is the sole survivor of the Tongyeong drowning case.
- Kim Myung-han (Ha Sung-kwang) is the director of the National Police Agency.
- Kim Sa-hyun (Kim Young-jae) is the Assistant-Chief Prosecutor at the Supreme Prosecutors' Office and part of the Investigative Procedure Reformation Council. He graduated as member of the 28th Class at the Judicial Research And Training Institute and maintains a close relationship with Woo Tae-ha.
- Kim Soo-hang (Kim Bum-soo) is a former police officer at Segok Police Station and nephew of Jeon Seung-pyo. He is suspected of bullying Song Gi-hyun.
- Kim Young-sik (Kim Ji-hoon) is an investigator at the Criminal Legislation Division at the Supreme Prosecutors' Office.
- Lee Dae-sung (Park Sung-il) is an officer at Segok Police Station.
- Lee Yoo-an (Choi Hee-seo) is Seo Dong-jae's wife.
- Lim Jung-gyu (Lim Chul-soo) is Seo Dong-jae's Investigator at the Prosecutors' Office of Uijeongbu.
- Managing Director Park (Jung Sung-il) is Lee Yeon-jae's right-hand man at Hanjo Group.
- Oh Byung-gun (Kwon Hyuk-bum) is an officer at Segok Police Station.
- Oh Joo-sun (Kim Hak-sun) is a former judge and currently works as a lawyer. He graduated as member of the 25th Class at the Judicial Research And Training Institute and is involved with Hanjo Group.
- Shin Jae-yong (Lee Hae-young) is the Chief of the Investigation Department of the National Police Agency and is part of the Investigative Procedure Reformation Council.
- Song Gi-hyun (Lee Ga-sub) is a police officer who gets relocated to Segok Police Station after standing up against gapjil at Dongducheon Police Station. His death plays a central role in the Segok Bullying case.

== Minor characters ==
The characters below are listed in alphabetical order. Following the Korean naming convention, the family name comes before the given name.

=== Season 1 ===
- Choi Kyung-soon (Nam Gi-ae) is Young Eun-soo's mother. She believes that Hwang Si-mok would be a good match for her daughter.
- Lee Moon-woo (Kim Ji-hoon) is Seo Dong-jae's investigator at the Seoul Western District Prosecutors' Office.
- Park Moo-sung's mother (Ye Soo-jung).

=== Season 2 ===
- Bae Jae-yeon (Son Ji-yoon) is Seo Dong-jae's Assisting Officer at the Prosecutors' Office of Uijeongbu.
- Choi Kang-il (Lee Ha-yool) is a colleague of Han Yeo-jin at the National Policy Agency.
- Heo Yoon-hwan (Yu Seung-il) is involved in the Segok Police Station case.
- Jeon Gi-hyuk (Ryu Sung-rok) is a witness who supposedly saw the kidnapping of Seo Dong-jae.
- Jeon Seung-pyo (Moon Jong-won) is the Chief of Dongducheon Police Station that gets demoted after power tripping a junior police officer.
- Ko Chang-yong (Oh Kyung-joo) is an officer at Segok Police Station.
- Lee Yong-ho (Kang Shin-hyo) is a rich heir who is suspected of trespassing and burning the warning rope at Tongyeong beach.
- Nam Jae-ik (Kim Gui-seon) is an assemblyman who is accused of bribery.
- Park Gwang-soo (Seo Jin-won) is the former Chief Prosecutor of Daejeon District Prosecutors' Office who currently works as a lawyer. He graduated as member of the 25th Class at the Judicial Research And Training Institute. His death from a heart failure catches the attention of Seo Dong-jae who suspects foul play.
- Seung-joon (Yoo In-soo) is one of the two students who died in the Tongyeong drowning case.
- Won-il (Na Do-yul) is one of the two students who died in the Tongyeong drowning case.
- Yoo Jung-oh (Chang Ryul) is a colleague of Han Yeo-jin at the National Policy Agency.

== Guest characters ==
The characters below are listed in alphabetical order. Following the Korean naming convention, the family name comes before the given name.

- Kim Byung-hyun (Tae In-ho) is the CEO of Sungmoon Daily newspaper. He was in a pre-arranged marriage with Lee Yeon-jae before she broke it off.

=== Season 1 ===
- Ahn Seung-ho (Sunwoo Jae-duk) is the Prosecutor-General at the Supreme Prosecutors' Office. He appears in Episodes 9 and 12.
- Hwang Si-mok's mother (Park Soon-chun) first appears in flashbacks in the first episode, trying to commit suicide when Si-mok was still young and suffered from hyperacusis. She appears a second time in the third episode with her husband, Si-mok's stepfather.
- Kang Jin-sub (Yoon Kyung-ho) is the first accused suspect of Park Moo-sung's murder case. He commits suicide while in prison. He appears in the first two episodes of the season.
- Kim Nam-jin (Lee Jae-yong) is a police division leader.
- Kim Tae-gyu (Lee Jae-won) is involved in Young Il-jae's bribery case. He appears in episode 10.
- Park Moo-sung (Um Hyo-sup) is a businessman who bribed corrupted prosecutors and political figures. His murder is central to the first season. He only appears in flashbacks in the first two episodes of the season.
- Cafe part timer (Yoon Ji-on)

=== Season 2 ===
- Director Noh (Kim Won-hae) is Han Yeo-jin's new direct superior once the innovation team is disbanded. He appears in the last episode of the second season and tells Yeo-jin that he is looking forward to working with her, surprising her colleagues who were ignoring her.
- Kim Hu-jung's father (Yoo Sung-joo) is a former prosecutor who currently works as a lawyer. He uses his connections to get his son, who is suspected of kidnapping Seo Dong-jae, released. But he is overruled by Kim Sa-hyun who contacted and asked for the help of a higher-ranked judge.
- Shin Dong-un (Hong Seo-joon) is the Assistant-Prosecutor General at the Supreme Prosecutors' Office. He appears in the penultimate and last episode of the season. Dong-un is not fond of Si-mok, who put him under pressure to re-open the Park Gwang-soo case. Something he was initially not planning to do as he promised Woo Tae-ha to cover it up.
- No Joo-eun (Jin So-yeon) is the girlfriend to Lee Yong-ho a rich heir who is suspected for the incident at the Tongyeong beach.

== See also ==
- List of Stranger episodes
