= List of Stranger episodes =

This is a list of episodes of the South Korean television series Stranger.

== Series overview ==
Season	Episodes	Originally released		Ave. South Korea viewers (millions)
Season	Episodes	First released	Last released	Ave. South Korea viewers (millions)
1	16	June 10, 2017	July 30, 2017	—N/a (Note: The number of viewers was released by Nielsen Media Research starting January 2018.)
2	16	August 15, 2020	October 4, 2020	1.774

== Episodes ==
=== Season 1 (2017) ===
No. overall	No. in season	Title	Directed by	Written by	Original release date
1	1	"Episode 1"	Ahn Gil-ho	Lee Soo-yeon	June 10, 2017
Despite being exceptional at his profession, South Korean prosecutor Hwang Si-mok (Cho Seung-woo) is frequently plagued by the side effects of having an abnormally developed brain—including the loss of empathy, lack of social skills and sensitivity to certain frequencies of sound. While investigating on a case, he discovers that his person of interest has been murdered. His lack of communication with the corresponding police unit forces him to be stopped by Police Lieutenant Han Yeo-jin (Bae Doona), who later assists him in arresting the lone evading suspect, who pleads not guilty. Despite the latter being convicted with evidence, Si-mok is left uncertain about it and passes his verdict to the deputy chief Lee Chang-joon (Yoo Jae-myung) as a robbery involving a third party instead of murder. Meanwhile, Yeo-jin tries to comfort the victim's family.
2	2	"Episode 2"	Ahn Gil-ho	Lee Soo-yeon	June 11, 2017
Despite Si-mok's initial verdict of robbery, his colleague Young Eun-soo (Shin Hye-sun) formally convicts the suspect of murder, which leads to her being ostracized by the public when the convict commits suicide despite the strong evidence proving his innocence. Yeo-jin obtains a DNA sample of the real suspect and submits it to Si-mok, who is beginning to suspect that the convict may have been framed. He tries to find documents inside the office of his colleague Seo Dong-jae (Lee Joon-hyuk), who indignantly prevents him from prowling around.
3	3	"Episode 3"	Ahn Gil-ho	Lee Soo-yeon	June 17, 2017
Si-mok makes a bold promise of catching the real suspect on live national television, infuriating his fellow colleagues. His past aggression from his personality traits becomes an object of public scrutiny. Yeo-jin later accompanies him in interviewing the victim's mother. Feeling guilty about Si-mok's insensitive queries to her, Yeo-jin invites the mother to her loft for company. Chang-joon asks his father-in-law Lee Yoon-beom (Lee Kyoung-young) for advice in dealing with Si-mok snooping around the wrong places. Si-mok then tries to find the person whom the victim had last talked to before being killed.
4	4	"Episode 4"	Ahn Gil-ho	Lee Soo-yeon	June 18, 2017
Word about Si-mok's past violent behavior quickly spreads out on social media. Unconcerned about it, Si-mok persists on investigating and focuses his attention on his suspicions about Eun-soo. He surmises with Yeo-jin that the deaths of both victim and convict may have been part of a larger scheme. Si-mok becomes suspicious of Dong-jae's proclivities, and follows him around the city. He later discovers that Dong-jae has been pursuing an underage female escort named Kwon Min-ah who is later found left-for-dead inside the house where the primary victim was murdered.
5	5	"Episode 5"	Ahn Gil-ho	Lee Soo-yeon	June 24, 2017
Perplexed about another turn-out on the case, Si-mok is joined by Yeo-jin in visiting the Min-ah's home to look for clues about her connection to the original incident. Dong-jae visits the police station to give an input about it. As Yeo-jin uncovers for the escort's real name was Kim Ga-young, Si-mok is anonymously accused of being the escort's abductor. As the police attempt to take him away for questioning, they are interdicted by a defensive Chang-joon. Though attesting of Si-mok's innocence, Yeo-jin is also mildly suspicious about him herself.
6	6	"Episode 6"	Ahn Gil-ho	Lee Soo-yeon	June 25, 2017
Eun-soo reveals to Si-mok the name of the last person to whom the primary victim had talked. A few people are beginning to question Si-mok's innocence in the case of Ga-young's abduction and assault, including Yeo-jin herself. Using the ringtone he heard when he called Ga-young's phone, Si-mok's list of possible suspects grows, including Dong-jae and the chief of police Kim Woo-gyoon (Choi Byung-mo). The primary victim's son returns from military service and reveals to Yeo-jin his connection to the escort. Dong-jae notices his office has been searched.
7	7	"Episode 7"	Ahn Gil-ho	Lee Soo-yeon	July 1, 2017
Chang-joon is appointed as Chief Prosecutor. At the hospital, someone attempts to kill an unconscious Ga-young, with a woman seen leaving the premises. The primary victim's son is arrested based on his relationship to both victims. Thinking that Dong-jae is secretly trying to destroy Ga-Young's phone as evidence of his connection to the escort's case, Si-mok and Yeo-jin team up to pursue and arrest him.
8	8	"Episode 8"	Ahn Gil-ho & Yoo Je-won	Lee Soo-yeon	July 2, 2017
Dong-jae is caught red-handed by Si-mok and gets reprimanded by Chang-joon, who suspends his indictment. The primary victim's son gets beaten up at the police station and is sent to the correctional facility. An enraged Yeo-jin is tempted to confront her chief Kim Woo-gyoon (Choi Byung-mo) about it, but is later calmed down by Si-mok. Eun-soo reveals herself to Dong-jae as Ga-young's abductor and coerces him to frame it to Chang-joon, whom she blames as the culprit behind her father's bribery indictment. Media spreads out news about the bribery and human rights abuses of the victim's son at the Western Seoul Prosecutors' Office, and both the police and the prosecutors are publicly shunned for it, leading for the accused to be immediately released.
9	9	"Episode 9"	Ahn Gil-ho & Yoo Je-won	Lee Soo-yeon	July 8, 2017
To avoid a larger corruption scheme surrounding the case, Si-mok is tasked by Chang-joon to lead a special investigations task force consisting of his prosecutor colleagues, key legal counselors and police detectives, including Yeo-jin and fellow prosecutor Yoon Se-won (Lee Kyu-hyung). Together, they probe Dong-jae as their starting point. Ga-young finally wakes up at the hospital.
10	10	"Episode 10"	Ahn Gil-ho & Yoo Je-won	Lee Soo-yeon	July 9, 2017
Fearing for Ga-young's security, Yeo-jin devises a plan to safely transfer her to a different hospital and discovers that something strange had happened involving Chang-joon's wife. Eun-soo tracks a fleeing person of interest and asks for Si-mok's help. Si-mok gives an update on the investigations, which includes an indictment of Woo-gyoon, resulting in an internal conflict in the force when Yeo-jin has to interview him herself. Chang-joon is appointed as Chief Secretary at the Blue House and receives a mysterious gift from someone anonymous.
11	11	"Episode 11"	Ahn Gil-ho & Yoo Je-won	Lee Soo-yeon	July 15, 2017
Yeo-jin pays a visit to Chang-joon's wife to inquire about her involvement with Ga-young. Woo-gyoon secretly asks Chang-joon for help in being vindicated from the case. Chang-joon invites Dong-jae to work for him at the Blue House, and is immediately confronted by Eun-soo. Si-mok and Yeo-jin devise a plan to reveal the truth behind the attempt on the escort's life and catch the suspect in the act, forcing the police to choose between their chief or the task force team. Ga-young later gives Si-mok and Yeo-jin information about her abduction.
12	12	"Episode 12"	Ahn Gil-ho & Yoo Je-won	Lee Soo-yeon	July 16, 2017
Using the information given to them, Si-mok and Yeo-jin discover new leads at the primary victim's house, where they are joined by the Captain who apologizes to the victim's son for falsely accusing him. At the Blue House, Dong-jae secretly records anomalous conversations inside Chang-joon's office, and shares his findings with Si-mok. Deducing Dong-jae's word, Si-mok goes to The Sungmoon Daily newspaper to exchange information about a government corruption scandal involving an anomalous sale of weaponry. Upon publishing the leak, the Prosecutor's Office orders the task force to be disbanded. While the members barricade themselves in their office, Si-mok appeals on their behalf. Meanwhile, Chang-joon becomes increasingly conflicted with duties as the Chief Secretary.
13	13	"Episode 13"	Ahn Gil-ho & Yoo Je-won	Lee Soo-yeon	July 22, 2017
Si-mok goes home to find his apartment has been broken into and that the intruder has left a warning for him. After the accused parties publicly apologize, the special task force disbands and its members resume their normal tasks. Si-mok asks Eun-soo's father for advice on how to expose corruption, as Yeo-jin searches for the intruder. Eun-soo uncovers a secret involving Se-won, who is moved to another division while Si-mok is offered to serve as a Division Chief Prosecutor. When Ga-young goes missing from the hospital, Si-mok has to choose between locating her or helping Eun-soo with her discovery.
14	14	"Episode 14"	Ahn Gil-ho & Yoo Je-won	Lee Soo-yeon	July 23, 2017
Si-mok and Yeo-jin discover Eun-soo has been murdered inside Ga-young's home, and find out Se-won is also at the scene of the crime. Remorseful for failing to help Eun-soo, Si-mok collapses after suffering from his hearing disorder. Though detecting that the recent murders were correlated with each other, Yeo-jin suspects a new killer may have been involved. As they look for answers inside Eun-soo's apartment, Si-mok and Yeo-jin uncover what Eun-soo had originally found that led to her death.
15	15	"Episode 15"	Ahn Gil-ho & Yoo Je-won	Lee Soo-yeon	July 29, 2017
Se-won is captured by the police as he tries to evade arrest for the serial murders. As Si-mok prosecutes to get a confession out of him, Yeo-jin goes to his house with the other detectives to gather evidence. Se-won confesses to the murders, except for Eun-soo's, and his strange behavior leads Si-mok into surmising that there is an accomplice aiding him.
16	16	"Episode 16"	Ahn Gil-ho & Yoo Je-won	Lee Soo-yeon	July 30, 2017
Si-mok finally unearths the truth behind Eun-soo's murder and the one orchestrating all the incidents. However, upon successfully chasing him, the mastermind commits suicide instead and bequeaths him a bag containing all the secrets demanding to be revealed. Using these secrets as evidence, Si-mok leads the prosecution to serve justice. He appears on live television chastising the past failures of the Prosecutor's Office and discloses the verity about Chang-joon, whom he characterized as a monster driven by his own principle. Afterwards, Dong-jae meets him and apologizes for his past behavior towards him. Yeo-jin is promoted to Senior Lieutenant; and to protect him from indignant corrupt officials, Si-mok is replaced by Dong-jae and is transferred to the County Prosecutor's Office. Ten months after the events, he is summoned back to the Central Office to lead a new special investigations task force.

=== Season 2 (2020) ===
No. overall	No. in season	Title	Directed by	Written by	Original release date	South Korea viewers (millions)
17	1	"Episode 1"	Park Hyun-suk	Lee Soo-yeon	August 15, 2020	1.915
Two years after the events surrounding Chang-joon, Si-mok is now a Prosecutor at the Tongyeong Prosecutors Office, waiting to be transferred to the Wonju Prosecutors Office. On his way through a seaside road on a foggy night, he is disturbed by a removed portion of a restricted fence at a beach nearby. Upon turning back, he discovers that emergency services has found two drowned bodies. He speculates that the incident, initially thought of as an accident caused by the victims, may have been instigated by another party. Yeo-jin, now a Senior Inspector at the Korean National Police headquarters, calls Si-mok and provides information about a couple who might have been involved in the incident at the time, before being assigned to a reformation unit by her Chief Choi Bit (Jeon Hye-jin), who is frequently incensed by the ostracism the Prosecution depicts the Police to the public. Despite finding promising leads, Si-mok is surprised to find out the case is immediately closed as a non-suspicious deposition at the Seoul Prosecutors Office.
18	2	"Episode 2"	Park Hyun-suk	Lee Soo-yeon	August 16, 2020	1.676
Si-mok continues to investigate on the drowning case and lodges a complaint to have it reopened. Yeo-jin, who meets with Choi Bit after an internal investigation is formally charged at their Police Superintendent, and finds out that the Prosecution has been targeting their Superintendent in a power struggle for investigative authority. Choi Bit meets with one of the victims' father and publicly implies the wrongdoing of the Prosecution in immediately closing the case. Si-mok is summoned by Chief Woo Tae-ha (Choi Moo-sung) at the Supreme Prosecutors' Office to join a Prosecutor-Police Council, and later inquires with his former Chief Kang Won-chul of the Seoul Prosecutors' Office about a Special Treatment in the drowning case. Yeon-jae, Chang-joon's widow and now CEO of the Hanjo Group, is infuriated upon discovering articles portraying her as complicit in using her husband to take over her family's business. Dong-jae, now a prosecutor at Uijeongbu Prosecutors' Office, presents Choi Bit's incriminating history to Tae-ha. Both Si-mok and Yeo-jin are summoned by their respective Chiefs to prepare to defend their agencies' interests in the forthcoming council.
19	3	"Episode 3"	Park Hyun-suk	Lee Soo-yeon	August 22, 2020	1.759
Yeo-jin tries to recruit Jang-geon, now a lieutenant, to the Council. Si-mok is assigned to investigate on the case Dong-jae has submitted to Tae-ha, which involves a suicide of a sergeant at the Segok Police Station. Yeon-jae hires a former district judge-turned-lawyer to become her internal counsel to persuade Won-chul in comdenming The Sungmoon Daily article.
20	4	"Episode 4"	Park Hyun-suk	Lee Soo-yeon	August 23, 2020	1.690
The police-prosecution council convenes for the first time, but was adjourned early after the debate of both sides has reached an impasse. Dong-jae schedules a meeting with Yeon-jae, whose chairmanship of her company is on the risk of losing to her stepbrother. He brings up a case involving the mysterious death of a former prosecutor, which leaves her concerned. After Choi Bit catches wind of Dong-jae investigating the Segok incident, she sends Yeo-jin to intercept his probe.
21	5	"Episode 5"	Park Hyun-suk	Lee Soo-yeon	August 29, 2020	1.576
Yeo-jin informs Choi Bit that the Segok incident may have also been a homicide, causing Choi Bit to be alarmed at its potential to be incriminating to the police's objective. Si-mok requests Won-chul for a warrant, but faces a problem instead. On her way to Anyang Correctional Facility to interview a suspect on the Segok case, Yeo-jin is surprised to see someone familiar who is also incarcerated there. Choi Bit later directs her to retrieve a sealed document and deliver it to an Assemblyman who is about to file a threatening lawsuit to the police, leaving a frustrated Tae-ha to order Si-mok to find its contents.
22	6	"Episode 6"	Park Hyun-suk	Lee Soo-yeon	August 30, 2020	1.626
Yeo-jin secretly makes a copy of the sealed document despite Choi Bit's orders not to open it, but Si-mok finds its contents himself nonetheless. Yeon-jae attempts to persuade the editor of The Sungmoon Daily, who owns a detrimental stake at her company, to join her side.
23	7	"Episode 7"	Park Hyun-suk	Lee Soo-yeon	September 5, 2020	1.476
Dong-jae is found to be missing, causing both the prosecution and police to conduct their own search. As Si-mok retraces Dong-jae's whereabouts and his current cases, a worried Choi Bit directs Yeo-jin to look for evidence of the police having no involvement in his disappearance.
24	8	"Episode 8"	Park Hyun-suk	Lee Soo-yeon	September 6, 2020	1.790
As the search for Dong-jae continues, Choi Bit is concerned he was probing about her the day he went missing and arranges for a clandestine meeting with Tae-ha. Si-mok receives a list of Dong-jae's upcoming indictments, and starts his inquisition with Yeon-jae at the Hanjo Group. Meanwhile, Yeo-jin interviews the convicts from the Segok case and how it may be connected to Dong-jae's. As Dong-jae's wife makes a public appeal on television, news broke out that a police officer may have been involved in his kidnapping.
25	9	"Episode 9"	Park Hyun-suk	Lee Soo-yeon	September 12, 2020	1.802
A culprit sends a message about Dong-jae to the public, which leaves the police to be openly ostracized. Si-mok and Yeo-jin analyze its contents. After receiving news of Choi Bit's involvement about the former prosecutor, Yeon-jae suspects Woo-chul and the Western Seoul Prosecution are about to file charges against her company, but changes her focus to Choi Bit and her connection to the former prosecutor's death, whose articles were also incidentally the last websites Dong-jae had visited prior to his disappearance.
26	10	"Episode 10"	Park Hyun-suk	Lee Soo-yeon	September 13, 2020	1.719
Si-mok becomes frustrated when Dong-jae's team openly divulges information on the cases he has left behind. While Yeo-jin investigates a potential lead involving the police, Si-mok investigates the former prosecutor. His progress on the search is noticed by Choi Bit and Tae-ha, who both want him to look for another lead instead. An eyewitness who claims to know about Dong-jae's abduction leaves a comment on the internet, wanting to come forward.
27	11	"Episode 11"	Park Hyun-suk	Lee Soo-yeon	September 19, 2020	1.742
The Segok officers are summoned to explain themselves to the police, with one of them being identified by an eyewitness as Dong-jae's abductor. However, Si-mok and Yeo-jin are concerned about the witness's testimony, and both try to recreate the crime scene based on his account. Tae-ha convenes the press to condemn the police and wants the prosecution to take over the investigation, leaving the police in a precarious position.
28	12	"Episode 12"	Park Hyun-suk	Lee Soo-yeon	September 20, 2020	1.750
Tae-ha and Choi Bit meet privately and discuss about the former prosecutor. While Tae-ha raises worriment about the former prosecutor's wife, Choi Bit is concerned about the judge-turned-lawyer and his persistent inquiry about the case. This causes an alarm to Yeon-jae, who arranges for a meeting with both of them. At the second police-prosecution council, Si-mok's hearing disorder returns to plague him.
29	13	"Episode 13"	Park Hyun-suk	Lee Soo-yeon	September 26, 2020	1.730
Despite Tae-ha's orders for him not to prowl around, Si-mok continues to investigate the former prosecutor's death, beginning with him inquiring with Won-chul about it. A member of Dong-jae's team later gives Si-mok an information about a student assault case Dong-jae has recently taken. After discussing with Yeo-jin about it, they find out its connection with the Tongyeong drowning incident.
30	14	"Episode 14"	Park Hyun-suk	Lee Soo-yeon	September 27, 2020	2.017
Si-mok and Yeo-jin chase after a suspect from the Tongyeong drowning incident and his connection to Dong-jae. A search party is formed to look for the missing prosecutor, while the fake eyewitness is summoned by the police.
31	15	"Episode 15"	Park Hyun-suk	Lee Soo-yeon	October 3, 2020	1.928
Tae-ha meets with Yeon-jae about the Hanjo trial and the former prosecutor, whose mystery surrounding his death continues to be probed by Si-mok. Si-mok confronts Tae-ha about it, only to be threatened by the latter. Joined by Yeo-jin, they found out more people are involved in it, including Choi Bit.
32	16	"Episode 16"	Park Hyun-suk	Lee Soo-yeon	October 4, 2020	2.186
Despite Tae-ha's threats to Si-mok and Yeo-jin, both prosecutor and police officer file formal investigation warrants in their respective agencies, resulting to Choi Bit public resignation and Tae-ha being put into trial. Won-chul also resigns and hands over the Hanjo case to the Central Seoul Prosecutors Office, forcing Yeon-jae to choose between keeping her company or continuing her late husband's legacy. She later visits an unconscious Dong-jae at the hospital. After recovering, Dong-jae reports to work and is interviewed about Hanjo's involvement with the former prosecutor. With their units now disbanded, Yeo-jin is transferred to the National Police's Intelligence division, while Si-mok is sent to the Wonju Prosecutors Office.
