= What Comes After Love =

2024 South Korean television series

- Teaser poster
- Hangul: 사랑 후에 오는 것들
- RR: Sarang hue oneun geotdeul
- MR: Sarang hue onŭn kŏttŭl
- Genre: Romance; Melodrama
- Based on: Things that Come After Love by: Gong Ji-yeong; Hitonari Tsuji
- Written by: Jung Hae-sim; Moon Hyun-sung
- Directed by: Moon Hyun-sung
- Starring: Lee Se-young; Kentaro Sakaguchi
- Country of origin: South Korea
- Original languages: Korean; Japanese
- No. of episodes: 6

Production
- Production locations: South Korea; Japan
- Production companies: Silver Lining Studio; Contents Seven

Original release
- Network: Coupang Play
- Release: September 27 – October 25, 2024

What Comes After Love (Korean: 사랑 후에 오는 것들) is a 2024 South Korean romance melodrama television series based on the novel Things that Come After Love by Gong Ji-young and Hitonari Tsuji, and depicts a love beyond national boundaries, between a South Korean woman and Japanese man. The series was written by Jung Hae-sim, directed by Moon Hyun-sung, and starring Lee Se-young and Kentaro Sakaguchi. It was released on Coupang Play and first shown from September 27 to October 25, 2024, every Friday at 20:00 (KST). It is also available for streaming on Viu and Viki in selected regions.

== Synopsis ==
A young Korean woman named Choi Hong meets a Japanese man named Jungo Aoki while she is studying and working in Japan. The narrative goes back and forth in time between present-day Korea and Japan five years previously. In the present time, Jungo has become a novelist, with the pseudonym Hikari Sasae, and is having his novel What Comes After Love? published in Korean translation, and travels there to publicize it. Unbeknownst to him and Hong, the book has been published by the publishing company owned by Hong's father, where she also works in a senior position. She is asked to step in at the last minute to act as interpreter when he arrives at the airport, and she is horrified to discover who the author is. Hong keeps her distance from Jungo while he is in Korea, even though he attempts to get her attention with the aim of getting them to talk things through. She then discovers that his novel is based on the story of their relationship, where he was dismissive of her when she was in Japan, leaving her alone while he busied himself working, which drove her to escape him.

== Cast and characters ==
- Lee Se-young as Choi Hong

A Korean woman who has tried to put her Japanese love behind her.

- Kentaro Sakaguchi as Jungo Aoki/Hikari Sasae

A regretful Japanese man who cannot forget his Korean girlfriend.

- Hong Jong-hyun as Song Min-jun

A Korean man who only has eyes for Hong.

- Anne Nakamura as Kanna Kobayashi

Jungo's clingy ex-girlfriend who has not moved on from their relationship.

- Lee So-hee as Choi Rok

Hong's younger sister.

== Production ==
=== Development ===
Director Moon Sung-hyun, who directed the films The King's Case Note (2017) and Seoul Vibe (2022), took the megaphone for his small screen directorial debut. Jung Hae-sim and Moon Hyun-sung served as the writers of the series. Silver Lining Studio with Contents Seven managed the production.

=== Casting ===
Lee Se-young and Kentaro Sakaguchi were reportedly cast to play the main characters of the series in July 2023 and officially confirmed in December 2023.

Hong Jong-hyun was reportedly cast to play as one of the lead characters for the series in January 2024 and officially confirmed in March 2024.

=== Filming ===
Principal photography began in early 2024 between South Korea and Japan.

== Release ==
Coupang Play announced that What Comes After Love would be released in 2024. On July 18, the company confirmed that the series would premiere on September 27. It is also available to stream on Viu and Viki.

== Accolades ==
=== Awards and nominations ===
Name of the award ceremony, year presented, category, nominee of the award, and the result of the nomination
Award ceremony	Year	Category	Nominee / Work	Result	Ref.
Asia Star Entertainer Awards	2025	Fan Choice Couple	Lee Se-young and Kentaro Sakaguchi	Won	
Asian Television Awards	2025	Best Drama Series (OTT)	What Comes After Love	Nominated	
Asian Television Awards	2025	Best Scriptwriting	Jung Hae-sim, Moon Hyun-sung	Nominated	
Asian Television Awards	2025	Best Theme Song	"Closer Than the Stars" – Fromm, Yu Jeong-yi, 4bros, Shin Min	Nominated	
ContentAsia Awards	2025	Best Director of a Scripted TV Series Made in Asia	Moon Hyun-sung	Nominated	
ContentAsia Awards	2025	Best Female Lead in a TV Programme/Series Made in Asia	Lee Se-young	Nominated	
Korea Drama Awards	2025	Top Excellence Award, Actress	Lee Se-young	Nominated	
Global OTT Awards	2025	Best Lead Actor	Kentaro Sakaguchi	Won	

=== Listicles ===
Name of publisher, year listed, name of listicle, and placement
Publisher	Year	Listicle	Placement	Ref.
NME	2024	The 10 best Korean dramas of 2024	10th place	
