= The Road: The Tragedy of One =

2021 South Korean mystery television series

- Promotional poster
- Also known as: The Tragedy of One; Birth of a Tragedy
- Hangul: 더 로드: 1의 비극
- RR: Deo rodeu: 1ui bigeuk
- MR: Tŏ rodŭ: 1ŭi pigŭk
- Genre: Mystery; Thriller; Drama
- Created by: Kim Je-hyeon (tvN)
- Based on: The Tragedy of One by Rintaro Norizuki
- Developed by: Kim Young-kyu; Studio Dragon
- Written by: Yoon Hee-jung
- Directed by: Kim No-won
- Starring: Ji Jin-hee; Yoon Se-ah; Kim Hye-eun; Kim Sung-soo
- Composers: Park Seung-jin; Choi Min-chang
- Country of origin: South Korea
- Original language: Korean
- No. of episodes: 12

Production
- Executive producer: Kim Gun-hong
- Producers: Oh Hwan-min; Kim Kyung-tae; Yoo Si-yeon
- Editors: Bae Young-joo; Kim Min-ji
- Camera setup: Single-camera
- Running time: 80 minutes
- Production company: The Great Show

Original release
- Network: tvN iQiyi
- Release: August 4 – September 9, 2021

The Road: The Tragedy of One (Korean: 더 로드: 1의 비극) is a 2021 South Korean television series directed by Kim No-won and starring Ji Jin-hee, Yoon Se-ah, Kim Hye-eun and Kim Sung-soo. Based on the work by Rintaro Norizuki, the series tells the story of the ugly desires, secrets, guilt and salvation of 'Royal the Hill', where only the top 1% of Korea live. It premiered on tvN on August 4, 2021, and aired on Wednesdays and Thursdays at 22.30 (KST) for 12 episodes.

== Synopsis ==
"Royal the Hill" is a posh place where the top one percent of Koreans live. The series tells the secrets, desires, guilts and salvation of the residents of this place.

Baek Soo-hyeon (Ji Jin-hee) the protagonist is a trusted anchor with strong beliefs. His words are taken as the truth, but he is a cold-hearted man. He will use any means to get what he desires. He is married to Seo Eun-soo (Yoon Se-ah), who is a daughter of the chairman of the Jegang Group, a heavy weight having influence in the political and economic worlds.

On a torrential rainy night a tragic incident takes place and the secrets connected with it result in silence, avoidance, and confusion, which eventually leads to another tragedy.

== Cast ==
=== Main ===
- Ji Jin-hee as Baek Soo-hyeon
  - Park Sang-hoon as young Baek Soo-hyun

45 years old, BSN News night anchor, a trusted journalist, a faithful family head. He is hiding a dark secret

- Yoon Se-ah as Seo Eun-soo

42 years old, a popular miniature artist, Baek Soo-hyeon's wife, the daughter of the steel group chairman, Seo Gi-tae

- Kim Hye-eun as Cha Seo-yeong

42 years old, BSN late night news anchor, always hungry for success

=== Supporting ===
==== People around Baek Soo-hyeon and Seo Eun-soo ====
- Chun Ho-jin as Seo Gi-tae

65 years old, father of Seo Eun-soo, the president of a leading conglomerate, self-righteous and overbearing

- Kim Min-joon as Baek Yeon-woo

12 years old, son of Soo-hyeon and Eun-su

- Kang Sung-min as Oh Jang-ho

41 years old, documentary director, husband of Eun-soo's younger sister, Eun-ho

- Kim Sung-soo as Sim Seok-hoon

45 years old, detective of the Metropolitan Investigation Unit, once the childhood friend of Baek Soo-hyeon from hometown, they cut off ties after a middle school girl disappeared in their hometown, Yeongsan

- Jo Seong-joon as Seo Jeong-wook

The son of Seo Ki-tae and Bae Baek-suk, Seo Jung-wook is someone who is afraid of Seo Ki-tae, but his name goes up and down every time he has a drug problem, including the Gap-jil case.

==== People around Cha Seo-yeong ====
- Ahn Nae-sang as Choi Nam-gyu

55 years old, husband of Cha Seo-young, a former lawyer and CEO of a large investment firm

- Lee Seo as Choi Se-ra

21 years old, daughter of Choi Nam-gyu and his first wife.

- Nam Ki-won as Choi Jun-young

12 years old, son of Nam-gyu and Seo-young

==== Steelmaking Foundation ====
- Kang Kyung-hun as Bae Kyung-Sook

45 years old, chairman of the steelmaking foundation

- Ha Min as Yang Yang

55 years old, head of planning department, steelmaking cultural foundation

- Jo Seong-joon as Seo Jeong-wook

22 years old, son of Seo Gi-tae and Bae Kyung-Sook

- Kim Roi-ha as Hwang Tae-seop

60 years old, 4th term National Assembly member

- Hyun Woo-sung as Jo Sang-mu

Seo Gi-tae's right-hand man, 40 years old, director of the steelmaking group

===== Press people =====
- Baek Ji-won as Kwon Yeo-jin

49 years old, Soo-hyeon's senior, a former news anchor and the first female director of BSN's news agency

- Oh Yong as Kang Jae-yeol

45 years old, Newsnight producer

- Joo Ye-eun as Park Mun-hwa :33 years old, Newsnight reporter

==== Others ====
- Lee Jong-hyuk as Yoon Dong-pil

45 years old, CEO of a large entertainment establishment

- Jo Jung-hwan as Park Seong-hwan

41 years old, freelance entertainment reporter and has a bad relationship with Baek Soo-hyeon

- Han Joo-wan as Kim Young-shin

35 years old, detective of the Metropolitan Investigation Unit

- Kang Sung-min as Oh Jang Ho

=== Special appearance ===
- Son Yeo-eun as Lee Mi-do

35 years old, Dark Dining employee

== Production ==
On March 30, 2021, the main cast of the drama was confirmed as Ji Jin-hee, Yoon Se-ah and Kim Hye-eun. On May 12, Yoon Se-ah posted photos from filming site. On June 25 announcing the premiere date, photos from script reading site were released.

== Original soundtrack ==
The Road: The Tragedy of One

Soundtrack album by Various
- Released: 2021
- Genre: Soundtrack
- Languages: Korean; English
- Label: Genie Music/Stone Music Entertainment

=== Score ===
Released on September 9, 2021
No.	Title	Music	Length
1.	"Way back"	Park Seong-jin, Choi Min-chang
2.	"Way back (sad ver.)"	Choi Min-chang
3.	"Way back (fast ver.)"	Choi Min-chang
4.	"Pressing"	Park Seong-jin, Choi Min-chang
5.	"Suspicious woman"	Choi Min-chang
6.	"Atonement"	Park Seong-jin, Choi Min-chang
7.	"Moment"	Kang Won-mi
8.	"Another sinner"	Park Seong-jin, Choi Min-chang
9.	"Lacio"	Choi Min-chang
10.	"Ominous"	Kang Won-mi
11.	"Sandcastle"	Choi Min-chang
12.	"Judgment"	Park Seong-jin, Choi Min-chang

=== Part 1 ===
Released on August 5, 2021
No.	Title	Lyrics	Music	Artist	Length
1.	"Memories"	Park Seong-jin, Jeon Seung-woo	Park Seong-jin, Choi Min-chang, Kim Do-yeon	Lee Seung-yeol	3:55
2.	"Memories" (Inst.)				3:55

=== Part 2 ===
Released on September 1, 2021
No.	Title	Lyrics	Music	Artist	Length
1.	"Find The Way"	Jayins, Naiv, Jemma	Jayins, Naiv	Jeong-In	3:23
2.	"Find The Way" (Inst.)				3:23

== Viewership ==
The Road: The Tragedy of One : South Korea viewers per episode (thousands)

Season	Episode number												Average
Season	1	2	3	4	5	6	7	8	9	10	11	12	Average
1	699	859	546	679	404	452	362	444	347	502	400	583	523

Source: Audience measurement performed nationwide by Nielsen Korea

Average TV viewership ratings
Ep.	Original broadcast date	Average audience share (Nielsen Korea)	
Ep.	Original broadcast date	Nationwide	Seoul
1	August 4, 2021	3.365% (1st)	3.748% (1st)
2	August 5, 2021	3.970% (2nd)	4.839% (2nd)
3	August 11, 2021	2.735% (2nd)	3.190% (2nd)
4	August 12, 2021	3.201% (2nd)	3.586% (2nd)
5	August 18, 2021	1.900% (3rd)	2.119% (3rd)
6	August 19, 2021	2.115% (3rd)	2.306% (3rd)
7	August 25, 2021	1.845% (3rd)	2.015% (2nd)
8	August 26, 2021	2.161% (3rd)	2.243% (4th)
9	September 1, 2021	1.733% (3rd)	1.734% (3rd)
10	September 2, 2021	2.470% (2nd)	2.256% (2nd)
11	September 8, 2021	1.957% (2nd)	2.126% (2nd)
12	September 9, 2021	2.856% (2nd)	3.099% (2nd)
Average		2.526%	2.772%
In the table above, the blue numbers represent the lowest ratings and the red numbers represent the highest ratings.; This drama airs on a cable channel/pay TV which normally has a relatively smaller audience compared to free-to-air TV/public broadcasters (KBS, SBS, MBC and EBS).
