= When I Turned Nine =

- Poster for When I Turned Nine (2004)
- Hangul: 아홉살 인생
- Hanja: 아홉살 人生
- RR: Ahopsal insaeng
- MR: Ahopsal insaeng
- Directed by: Yun In-ho
- Written by: Lee Man-hee
- Produced by: Hwang Ki-seong
- Starring: Kim Seok; Lee Se-young
- Cinematography: Chun Jo-myuong
- Edited by: Kim Hyeon
- Music by: Noh Young-shim
- Distributed by: Cinema Service
- Release date: March 26, 2004
- Running time: 105 minutes
- Country: South Korea
- Language: Korean

When I Turned Nine (Korean: 아홉살 인생; RR: Ahopsal insaeng; lit. 'Life at Age Nine') is a 2004 South Korean drama film.

== Synopsis ==
The film focuses on Baek Yeo-min (Kim Seok), a thoughtful and mature nine-year-old boy living in 1970s Korea. Trying to help his one-eyed mother after noticing a pair of expensive glasses in a store, Yeo-min decides to make his own money by getting a job as an ice-cream boy, selling ice cream and doing chores until his mother notices the money he made and punishes Yeo-min, saying that he shouldn't have made money from his summer jobs.

During a school punishment, he meets a haughty new girl named Jang Woo-rim (Lee Se-young). At first they both don't like each other, but they soon become best friends. For many months they happily spend time together, but their relationship ends when she has to move back to Seoul to live with her father. The night before she leaves, Yeo-min gives her a surprise kiss on the cheek and runs away. Woo-rim later tells a surprised Yeo-rim that she is actually in love with him, and she leaves him a present: a pair of glasses for his mother. Walking away with his friends in the snow at the end of the movie, he looks back at her with a glum expression on his face.

== Cast ==
- Kim Seok as Baek Yeo-min
- Lee Se-young as Jang Woo-rim
- Na Ah-hyun as Oh Geum-bok
- Kim Myung-jae as Shin Ki-jong
- Jung Sun-kyung as Yeo-min's mother
- Ahn Nae-sang as Tam-im
- Ji Dae-han as Yeo-min's father
- Seo Jin-won as Park Pal-bong
- Shin Jung-geun as Black Swallow's father
- Jung Ae-yeon as Kim Yoon-hee
- Noh Hyeon-jeong as Black Swallow's mother
- Go Seo-hee as Shin Ki-soon
- Choi Deok-moon as Park Pal-bong

== Reception ==
Upon its release, the film attracted 352,182 viewers.

It also won Best Film, Best Director, Best Screenplay, and Best Child Actor/Actress at the 12th Chunsa Film Art Awards in 2004.
