= Kim Seok (equestrian) =

South Korean equestrian and actor (born 1992)

- Born: August 10, 1992 (age 34); South Korea
- Occupations: Equestrian; actor
- Years active: 1997–2009

Korean name
- Hangul: 김석
- RR: Gim Seok
- MR: Kim Sŏk

Kim Seok (born August 10, 1992) is a South Korean equestrian and former actor. He began his career as a child actor in 1997, starring in films and television dramas such as When I Turned Nine (2004), Seoul 1945 (2006) and Princess Hours (2006). In 1999, Kim was encouraged by his father to take up horseback riding in order to boost his stamina, but his skill in the sport led him to put his entertainment activities on hold in 2009 and focus on being a member of the Korean national equestrian team. He competed in the 2010 Asian Games in Guangzhou and the 2014 Asian Games in Incheon.

== Filmography ==
=== Film ===
Year	Title	Role
1997	No. 3	Tae-ju's son
1999	Sunflower Blues (short film)	Kang Doo-sik
2000	Kilimanjaro	Beon-gae's son
2002	Can't Live Without Robbery	Go Soo-min
2003	My Teacher, Mr. Kim	Joon-seok
2004	When I Turned Nine	Baek Yeo-min
2004	My Brother	young Kim Jong-hyeon

=== Television series ===
Year	Title	Role	Network
1999	Days of Delight	Hong Dong-seok	MBC
2002	My Love Patzzi		MBC
2004	Jang Gil-san	young Jang Gil-san	SBS
2004	Toji, the Land	Choi Hwan-gook	SBS
2004	Kaikyo wo Wataru Violin (The Violin Across the Channel)	young Jin Chang-hyun	Fuji TV
2005	Ballad of Seodong	young Seodong	SBS
2006	Seoul 1945	young Choi Woon-hyuk	SBS
2006	Princess Hours	Shin Chae-joon	MBC
2006	Jumong	Onjo	MBC
2006	Dae Jo-yeong	Dae-dan	KBS1
2007	The Legend	Dalgu's friend	MBC
2009	Queen Seondeok	young Imjong	MBC

== Awards and nominations ==
Year	Award	Category	Nominated work	Result
2004	12th Chunsa Film Art Awards	Best Young Actor/Actress	When I Turned Nine	Won
2006	KBS Drama Awards	Best Young Actor	Seoul 1945	Won
2007	KBS Drama Awards	Best Young Actor	Dae Jo-yeong	Nominated
2009	National Union Equestrian Federation	Gold Medal	Haute école Standard Hurdles	Won
