= Lovely Rivals =

- Theatrical poster
- Hangul: 여선생 VS 여제자
- Hanja: 女先生 VS 女弟子
- RR: Yeoseonsaeng VS yeojeja
- MR: Yŏsŏnsaeng VS yŏjeja
- Directed by: Jang Kyu-sung
- Written by: Lee Won-jae; Jang Kyu-sung
- Produced by: Kim Mi-hee
- Starring: Yum Jung-ah; Lee Se-young; Lee Ji-hoon
- Cinematography: Lee Du-man
- Edited by: Ko Im-pyo
- Music by: Jo Yeong-wook
- Production company: FNH
- Distributed by: CJ Entertainment; StudioCanal(France)
- Release date: November 17, 2004
- Running time: 109 minutes
- Country: South Korea
- Languages: Korean; French
- Box office: US$4.7 million

Lovely Rivals (Korean: 여선생 vs 여제자; RR: Yeoseonsaeng vs yeojeja; lit. 'Female teacher vs. female student') is a 2004 South Korean comedy film about a harsh teacher and her headstrong 5th grade student who battle for the affection of the school's handsome new teacher. The film attracted 1,175,580 admissions in 2004.

The scene in which the character Yeo Mi-ok is caught on camera slapping her student was based on a similar real-life incident from earlier in the year in which a teacher repeatedly punched a student in the face.

== Plot ==
On the first day of the new elementary school year in Korea, Ms. Yeo Mi-ok (Yum Jung-ah) lays down the law to her students. She is strict and demanding. When her new student Go Mi-nam (Lee Se-young) arrives late and calmly takes her seat, Yeo ignores Mi-nam. Assigned bathroom cleaning duty as punishment, Mi-nam beats up the girls who taunt her and forces them to clean instead. At home we see that Mi-nam lives with her mother, who rarely has time for her because of the hours she must work at the food and alcohol tent she owns.

Back at school, the newest male teacher Mr. Kwon Sang-min (Lee Ji-hoon) is causing a stir with his handsome good looks, and every female teacher and student is falling for him. Mi-nam tries to apologize and unburden herself to Ms. Yeo, who ignores her while trying to impress Mr. Kwon. Mi-nam decides to compete for him as well, even getting his cellphone number. Mr. Kwon goes to Ms. Yeo for advice on how to deal with the students' affection, not realizing she likes him too. The teacher and the student start a heated rivalry that climaxes when Ms. Yeo slaps Mi-nam in class—and is recorded doing so on a student's cellphone camera.

She resigns from the school but eventually makes amends with Mi-nam and returns to teach.

== Cast ==
- Yum Jung-ah - Yeo Mi-ok
- Lee Se-young - Go Mi-nam
- Lee Ji-hoon - Kwon Sang-min
- Byun Hee-bong - Principal Byun In-chul
- Lee Won-jong - traffic police officer
- Na Moon-hee - Mi-ok's mother
- Choi Ran - Mi-nam's mother
- Kim Eung-soo - vice principal
- Choi Bo-kwang - Jang Soo-kyung
- Lee Jae-gu - Kim Joon-sung
- Kim Ga-eun - Grade 5 Class 2 female student
- Im Won-hee - man in TV drama (cameo)
- Cha Seung-won - Teacher Kim Bong-doo (cameo)
