= Lee Se-young =

South Korean actress (born 1992)

- Lee in 2026
- Born: December 20, 1992 (age 33); Seoul, South Korea
- Education: Sungshin Women's University – Media Communications
- Occupation: Actress
- Years active: 1997–present
- Agent: Fantagio

Korean name
- Hangul: 이세영
- RR: I Seyeong
- MR: I Seyŏng

Lee Se-young (Korean: 이세영; born December 20, 1992) is a South Korean actress. She debuted as a child actress in 1997 and was best known for her roles in Dae Jang Geum (2003), When I Turned Nine (2004), Lovely Rivals (2004), and The Wonder Years (2007). She is best known for her leading roles in The Crowned Clown (2019), The Red Sleeve (2021), The Law Cafe (2022), The Story of Park's Marriage Contract (2023), What Comes After Love (2024), and The Remarried Empress (2026).

Lee has received multiple awards and has been featured multiple times in Forbes magazine's Korea Power Celebrity 40 list. She is referred to as a "Historical Drama Queen" due to her prominent roles in several successful historical drama.

== Early life and education ==
Lee Se-Young was born on December 20, 1992 in Bangbae-Dong Seocho District, Seoul, South Korea. Lee reportedly revealed on MBC's Radio Star that her parents put her into acting because they feared she would be kidnapped due to her appearance. During the early 1990s, there were many child-kidnapping incidents that shook South Korea. Lee's parents got her into the Entertainment Industry hoping that if she became well-known it would deter kidnappers.

Lee Se-Young attended Seoumun girl's middle school and high school. Lee attended Sungshin Women's University majoring in Media Communications where she was named Queen of Campus.

== Career ==
=== Beginnings ===
Lee began her career as a child actress; and was best known for the films When I Turned Nine, Lovely Rivals, and The Wonder Years.

As she entered her early twenties, Lee also appeared in the television series Puberty Medley, Missing You and Goddess of Marriage, as well as films Horror Stories 2 and Hot Young Bloods. Lee got increasingly larger roles in music romance drama Lovers of Music and fantasy mystery thriller The Vampire Detective.

=== 2016–present: Rising popularity ===
Lee's popularity increased after starring in the family drama The Gentlemen of Wolgyesu Tailor Shop (2016), where she received favourable reviews. She and co-star Hyun Woo were dubbed as "The Ahchoo Couple" by fans. Lee also won the Best New Actress award in the television category at the Baeksang Arts Award for her performance.

In 2017, Lee starred in her first leading role in free-to-air TV station with KBS2's youth drama Hit the Top. Lee then starred in the fantasy romantic comedy drama A Korean Odyssey by the Hong sisters, and was praised for her portrayal of three different characters.

In 2018, Lee played her first big-screen leading role in the comedy film Duck Town.

In 2019, Lee starred in the tvN historical drama The Crowned Clown, based on the 2012 Korean historical film Masquerade, where she played the role of Queen Yoo So-woon. The same year, she appeared in the horror film Lingering and the medical drama Doctor John.

In 2020, Lee starred in the mystery thriller Memorist as a genius profiler. She then reunited with Shin Sung-rok, whom she previously worked with in Lovers of Music, for the MBC drama Kairos.

In 2021, Lee played the role of Sung Deok-im in MBC hit historical romance drama The Red Sleeve, co-starring alongside Lee Jun-ho.

In 2022, Lee made a special appearance as a cinema employee in the film Seoul Vibe. Lee also played the lead role as a lawyer named Kim Yu-ri in KBS romantic comedy drama The Law Cafe, reuniting with A Korean Odyssey co-star Lee Seung-gi.

In November 2023, she also appeared in the time-traveling historical fantasy drama titled The Story of Park's Marriage Contract.

In September 2025, Lee left her agency Prain TPC, which she had been with for 11 years, and signed an exclusive contract with Fantagio.

In November 2026, she appeared as a mistress named Rashta in the Disney+ romantic drama titled The Remarried Empress.

== Other ventures ==
=== Ambassadorship ===
In 2005, Lee was appointed as an Honorary Space Ambassador by Korea Aerospace Research Institute, Ministry of Science and Technology. Lee was appointed as the first ambassador of Seoul Teen Women's Festival by the Seoul Metropolitan Government in 2008 to help promote and create a safe Seoul for teenage girls. In June 2011, Lee was appointed as a Public Relations Ambassador for Energy Citizen Solidarity to promote the importance of energy conservation practice and protecting the environment. In 2018, Lee was appointed as a Crime Prevention Ambassador by Seoul Gangdong Police Station, Seoul Metropolitan Police Agency.

=== Endorsements ===
In 2008, Lee became the first model and endorser for Nana's B, a cosmetic brand for teenagers by LG H&H. In 2012, she was appointed as an exclusive model for Samchuly, the most well-known bicycle company in Korea. In 2013, Lee was named as an executive model for Clean & Clear. From 2017 to 2019, Lee became a model and endorser for the cosmetic brand Tony Moly and a French dessert company and the world's largest franchise brand of yogurt Yoplait from 2017 to 2020. In 2020, She was named as the new ambassador of a cosmetic brand The Face Shop new line Yehwadam by LG H&H. In 2022, Lee re-appeared as an ambassador for Yoplait, became the first Cetaphil brand ambassador in Korea, an exclusive model for Italian luxury brand Versace fragrances, and the first brand ambassador for eco-friendly fashion brand Joseph and Stacey. In 2023, Lee became an exclusive model for sunglasses brand Vedi Vero. In 2024, she became an exclusive model for the fermented milk product Dr. Capsule 100 by Binggrae and an exclusive model and endorser for home aesthetic brand Vanav. In 2025, Lee became an exclusive model for clothing brand SOUP known for its romantic and feminine mood, became friends of the house Japanese luxury brand Shiseido, and brand ambassador for French luxury hair care Rene Furterer by Laboratoires Pierre Fabre. In August, Lee become an exclusive model for a contemporary Korean fashion brand with a Parisian sensibility Merci Anne S.

== Filmography ==
=== Film ===
Year	Title	Role	Notes	Ref.
2004	Dance with Solitude	Young-hee		
2004	When I Turned Nine	Jang Woo-rim		
2004	Lovely Rivals	Go Mi-nam		
2005	All for Love	Jasmine, an aspiring actress	Cameo	
2007	The Wonder Years	Soo-ah		
2012	All About My Wife	Jang Sung-ki's stalker	Cameo	
2012	Grape Candy	Female bank customer	Cameo	
2013	Horror Stories 2	Se-young	Segment: "444"	
2014	Hot Young Bloods	So-hee		
2018	Duck Town	Hee-jung		
2020	Lingering	Yoo-mi		
2022	Seoul Vibe	cinema employee	Special appearance	

=== Television series ===
Year	Title	Role	Notes	Ref.
1997	The Brothers' River			
1998	The Path of the Great Dynasty	Princess Cheongseon		
1998	My Mother's Daughters			
1999	Did We Really Love?	Kang Jae-young (young)		
1999	Promise	Jin-ju		
1999	Sunday Best – "Dangerous Lullaby"	Im Ja-min		
2000	MBC Best Theater – "Song, Let's Play"	Kang Song-yi		
2000	MBC Best Theater – "He was Abandoned by Her"	Hye-jin		
2000	Foolish Princes	Yeo Sat-byul		
2001	I Want to See Your Face	Lee So-dam		
2002	Present	Kim Da-hee		
2002	Original Fairy Tales on TV – "Robinson Crusoe in the Classroom"	Lee Hye-jung		
2002	My Love Patzzi	Yang Song-yi (young)		
2002	Kitchen Maid			
2003	Country Princess	Lee Eun-hee (young)		
2003	Land of Wine	Lee Sun-hee (young)		
2003	Drama City –"Queen of Disco"	Kang Soo-ji		
2003	Merry Go Round	Sung Eun-kyo (young)		
2003	Jewel in the Palace	Choi Geum-young (young)		
2004	Beijing My Love	Jang Na-ra		
2005	HDTV Literature –"Sonaki"	Girl		
2005	Single Again	Lee Soo-jin		
2005	Sisters of the Sea	Song Choon-hee (young)		
2006	High Kick!	Lee Se-young	Cameo (Episode 143)	
2008	Kokkiri (Elephant)	Gook Se-young		
2011	KBS Drama Special – "Yeongdeok Women's Wrestling Team"	Cha Bong-hee		
2011	Bachelor's Vegetable Store	Han Tae-in		
2012	Dream of the Emperor	Chun Gwan-nyeo		
2012	Missing You	Han Ah-reum		
2013	Goddess of Marriage	Noh Min-jung		
2013	Puberty Medley	Yang Ah-young		
2013	Drama Festival – "Haneuljae's Murder"	Mi-soo		
2014	Lovers of Music	Park Soo-in		
2016	The Vampire Detective	Han Gyeo-wool		
2016	The Gentlemen of Wolgyesu Tailor Shop	Min Hyo-won		
2017	Hit the Top	Choi Woo-seung		
2017	A Korean Odyssey	Jin Bu-ja / Jung Se-ra / Ah Sa-nyeo		
2019	The Crowned Clown	Yoo So-woon		
2019	Doctor John	Kang Shi-young		
2020	Memorist	Han Sun-mi		
2020	Kairos	Han Ae-ri		
2021–2022	The Red Sleeve	Seong Deok-im / Royal Noble Consort Uibin Seong		
2022	The Law Cafe	Kim Yu-ri		
2023–2024	The Story of Park's Marriage Contract	Park Yeon-woo		
2025	Motel California	Ji Kang-hee		
TBA	Long Vacation	Lee Deul-pan		
TBA	Covet the Scholar, Princess	Princess Eun-myeong		

=== Web series ===
Year	Title	Role	Ref.
2020	How Are U Bread	Noh Mi-rae	
2024	What Comes After Love	Choi Hong	
2026	The Remarried Empress	Rashta Isqua	

=== Television shows ===
Year	Title	Role	Notes	Ref.
2017	King of Mask Singer	Contestant	as "Kisses It's Nice to Meet Kissing Gourami" (Episode 109)	
2017	Get It Beauty	Main host		
2018–2019	Weekend Playlist	Cast member		
2024	Europe Outside Your Tent - Romantic Italy	Cast member		

=== Hosting ===
Year	Title	Notes	Ref.
2023	19th Seoul International Drama Awards	with Jun Hyun-moo	
2023	2023 MBC Entertainment Awards	with Jun Hyun-moo and Dex	

=== Music video appearances ===
Year	Song Title	Artist	Ref.
2002	"S.II.S (Soul To Soul)"	S.E.S	
2008	"가슴아 그만"	Black	
2011	"Don't Touch My Girl"	Boyfriend	
2014	"If I"	Chung Dong-ha	
2014	"I Feel on You"	Lee Seung-hwan (feat. Lee So-eun)	

== Accolades ==
=== Awards and nominations ===
Name of the award ceremony, year presented, category, nominee of the award, and the result of the nomination
Award ceremony	Year	Category	Nominee / Work	Result	Ref.
APAN Star Awards	2022	Best Couple	Lee Se-young (with Lee Jun-ho); The Red Sleeve	Nominated	
APAN Star Awards	2022	Excellence Award, Actress in a Miniseries	The Red Sleeve	Nominated	
APAN Star Awards	2022	Popularity Star Award, Actress	The Red Sleeve	Nominated	
APAN Star Awards	2024	Best Couple	Lee Se-young (with Kentaro Sakaguchi); What Comes After Love	Nominated	
Asia Contents Awards	2025	Best Female Lead in a TV Programme/Series Made in Asia	What Comes After Love	Nominated	
Asia Star Entertainer Awards	2025	Fan Choice Couple	Lee Se-young (with Kentaro Sakaguchi); What Comes After Love	Won	
Asian Television Awards	2025	Best Actress in a Leading Role	What Comes After Love	Won	
Baeksang Arts Awards	2005	Best New Actress – Film	Lovely Rivals	Nominated	
Baeksang Arts Awards	2017	Best New Actress – Television	The Gentlemen of Wolgyesu Tailor Shop	Won	
Baeksang Arts Awards	2022	Best Actress – Television	The Red Sleeve	Nominated	
Brand Customer Loyalty Awards	2024	Best Actress (Drama)	Herself	Won	
Chunsa Film Art Awards	2004	Best Young Actress	When I Turned Nine	Won	
KBS Drama Awards	2005	Best Young Actress	Rain Shower	Won	
KBS Drama Awards	2016	Best Couple	Lee Se-young (with Hyun Woo); The Gentlemen of Wolgyesu Tailor Shop	Won	
KBS Drama Awards	2016	Best New Actress	The Gentlemen of Wolgyesu Tailor Shop	Won	
KBS Drama Awards	2022	Best Couple	Lee Se-young (with Lee Seung-gi); The Law Cafe	Won	
KBS Drama Awards	2022	Excellence Award, Actress in a Miniseries	The Law Cafe	Nominated	
KBS Drama Awards	2022	Top Excellence Award, Actress	The Law Cafe	Nominated	
Korean Broadcasting Awards	2023	Best Actor/Actress	The Law Cafe	Won	
Korea Drama Awards	2017	Best New Actress	The Gentlemen of Wolgyesu Tailor Shop	Nominated	
Korea Drama Awards	2019	Excellence Award, Actress	The Crowned Clown	Won	
Korea Drama Awards	2025	Top Excellence Award, Actress	What Comes After Love Motel California	Nominated	
Korean Film Awards	2004	Best New Actress	When I Turned Nine	Nominated	
MBC Drama Awards	2020	Best Couple Award	Lee Se-young (with Shin Sung-rok); Kairos	Nominated	
MBC Drama Awards	2020	Top Excellence Award, Actress in a Monday-Tuesday Miniseries / Short Drama	Kairos	Nominated	
MBC Drama Awards	2021	Best Couple Award	Lee Se-young (with Lee Jun-ho); The Red Sleeve	Won	
MBC Drama Awards	2021	Top Excellence Award, Actress in a Miniseries	The Red Sleeve	Won	
MBC Drama Awards	2023	Best Couple Award	Lee Se-young (with Bae In-hyuk); The Story of Park's Marriage Contract	Nominated	
MBC Drama Awards	2023	Top Excellence Award, Actress in a Miniseries	The Story of Park's Marriage Contract	Won	
MBC Drama Awards	2025	Best Actress Award	Motel California	Won	
SBS Drama Awards	2019	Excellence Award in Miniseries (Actress)	Doctor John	Won	
SBS Drama Awards	2019	Best Couple	Lee Se-young (with Ji Sung); Doctor John	Nominated	
Seoul International Drama Awards	2021	Outstanding Korean Actress	Kairos	Nominated	

=== Listicles ===
Name of publisher, year listed, name of listicle, and placement
Publisher	Year	Listicle	Placement	Ref.
Cine21	2021	New Actress to watch out for in 2022	6th (Note: Tied with Go Min-si, Park Eun-bin, Keum Sae-rok, Joo Hyun-young, Park Gyu-young, Lee Soo-kyung, Roh Yoon-seo, Gong Seung-yeon, Moon Ga-young, IU, Keum Sae-rok, Park Ji-hu, Han So-hee, Jung Ji-so, Bang Min-ah, Jeon Jong-seo, Roh Jeong-eui)	
Forbes	2023	Korea Power Celebrity 40	20th	
Forbes	2024	Korea Power Celebrity 40	34th	
Forbes	2025	Korea Power Celebrity 40	40th	
