= The Vampire Detective =

2016 South Korean TV series

- Promotional poster
- Genre: Fantasy; Horror; Action; Thriller; Mystery; Occult detective fiction
- Written by: Yoo Young-seon
- Directed by: Kim Ga-ram; Lee Seung-hoon
- Starring: Lee Joon; Oh Jung-se; Lee Se-young; Lee Chung-ah; Jei
- Country of origin: South Korea
- Original language: Korean
- No. of episodes: 12

Production
- Running time: 60 minutes

Original release
- Network: OCN
- Release: March 27 – June 12, 2016

Related
- Vampire Prosecutor

The Vampire Detective (Korean: 뱀파이어 탐정; RR: Baempaieo tamjeong; lit. 'Vampire Detective') is a South Korean television drama starring Lee Joon, Oh Jung-se, Lee Se-young and Lee Chung-ah. The series aired on Sundays, from March 27, 2016, to June 12, 2016, on OCN for 12 episodes.

== Plot ==
Yoon San (Lee Joon) works as a private detective with his friend Yong Goo-Hyung (Oh Jung-se). One day, Yoon San is turned into a vampire. He remains a private detective who solves cases for his clients all the while uncovering the secrets from his past.

== Cast ==
=== Main ===
- Lee Joon as Yoon San
- Oh Jung-se as Yong Goo-hyung
- Lee Se-young as Han Gyeo-wool
- Lee Chung-ah as Yo-na

=== Supporting ===
- Jo Bok-rae as Kang Tae-woo
- Ahn Se-ha as Detective Park Hyung-sa
- Lee Jung-hyuk as Ji Seung-cheol
- Jei as Se-ra
- Kim Yoon-hye as Jung Yoo-jin
- Kim Ki-moo as Doctor Hwang
- Oh Hee-joon as Yoo Goo-hyung
- Choi Gwi-hwa as Jang Tae-shik
- Kim Ha-rin
- Jo Won-hee
- Han Ho-yong
- Lee Hae-young
- Ha Joo-hee

=== Special appearances ===
- Han Soo-yeon as Yeon-joo (Ep. 1)
- Jae Hee as Han Gyo-min (Ep. 1)
- Choi Song-hyun as Seo Seung-hee (Ep. 2)
- Park Jin-joo as Radio Staffer (Ep. 2)
- Kim Young-jae as Kim Kyung-soo (Ep. 2)
- Park Doo-shik as Choi Cheol-woo (Ep. 3)
- Park Hyo-jun as Choi Cheol-yong (Ep. 3)
- Kim Nan-hee as Moon Mee-jin (Ep. 4)
- Han Eun-seo as Lee Soo-yeon (Ep. 6)
- Lee Ah-jin as Moon Mi-so (Ep. 9)

== Ratings ==
Note: The blue color indicates the lowest rating while the red color indicates the highest rating.

Episode #	Original broadcast date	Average audience share	
Episode #	Original broadcast date	TNmS Ratings	AGB Nielsen Ratings
1	March 27, 2016	0.8%	1.092%
2	April 3, 2016	0.9%	1.318%
3	April 10, 2016	0.9%	1.034%
4	April 17, 2016	—	1.179%
5	April 24, 2016	0.7%	0.722%
6	May 1, 2016	0.5%	1.031%
7	May 8, 2016	0.7%	0.769%
8	May 15, 2016	0.8%	0.726%
9	May 22, 2016	0.6%	0.918%
10	May 29, 2016	0.7%	0.894%
11	June 5, 2016	—	0.628%
12	June 12, 2016	0.6%	0.898%
Average		0.6%	0.934%

Note: This drama airs on cable channel / pay TV which has a relatively small audience compared to free-to-air TV / public broadcasters (KBS, MBC, SBS, and EBS).

== Awards and nominations ==
Year	Award	Category	Recipient	Result
2016	52nd Paeksang Arts Awards	Most Popular Actor	Lee Joon	Nominated

== See also ==
- List of vampire television series
