= Yoon Se-ah =

South Korean actress (born 1978)

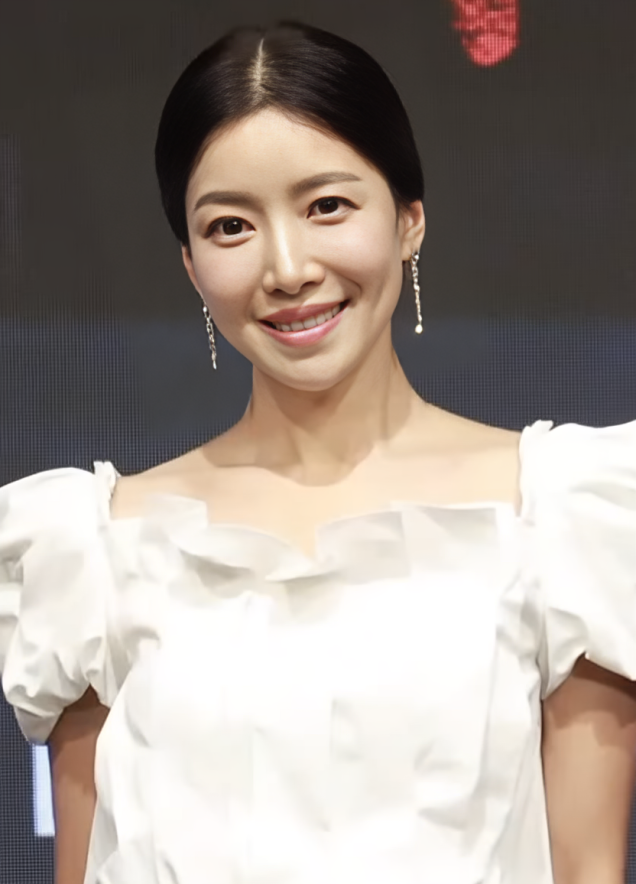
- Yoon in August 2024
- Born: January 2, 1978 (age 48); Daegu, South Korea
- Education: Yong In University (Theatre and Film)
- Occupation: Actress
- Years active: 2005–present
- Agent: Ace Factory

Korean name
- Hangul: 윤세아
- Hanja: 尹世雅
- RR: Yun Sea
- MR: Yun Sea

Yoon Se-ah (Korean: 윤세아; born January 2, 1978) is a South Korean actress. Yoon is best known for her roles in The City Hall, Wife Returns, A Gentleman's Dignity, Stranger, Sky Castle and Snowdrop.

== Career ==
On August 18, 2012, to March 2, 2013, Yoon was paired with Korean-French-Canadian actor and model Julien Kang for the fourth season of reality show We Got Married their appearance were dubbed as the "KangYoon Couple" and "Juliah Couple" by fans.

== Other activities ==
=== Philanthropy ===
On March 7, 2022, Yoon donated ₩10 million to Korea Disaster Relief Association to help the victims of Uljin forest fire 2022, which devastated the area and then spread to Samcheok, Gangwon Province, South Korea.

On August 11, 2022, Yoon donated ₩10 million to help those affected by the 2022 South Korea floods through the Hope Bridge Korea Disaster Relief Association.

On February 9, 2023, Yoon donated ₩10 million to help in the 2023 Turkey–Syria earthquakes through World Vision for Earthquake Relief in Turkey and Syria.

== Filmography ==
=== Film ===
Year	Title	Role	Notes	Ref.
2005	Blood Rain	Kang So-yeon		
2007	Shadows in the Palace	Hui-bin		
2010	Parallel Life (평행이론)	Bae Yun-kyeong		
2011	Funny Neighbors (수상한 이웃들)	Yoon Hye-jeong		
2012	Doomsday Book	Min-seo's mother		
2014	Scarlet Innocence	Chung-ee's mother	cameo	
2016	A Man and a Woman	Se-na		
2017	Bluebeard	Jo Soo-jung		
2020	Honest Candidate	Kim Joon-young	Cameo	

=== Television series ===
Year	Title	Role	Notes	Ref.
2005	Lovers in Prague	Kang Hye-joo		
2005	That Woman			
2006	The King of Head-butts	Yoon Boon-hong		
2006	Smile Again	Choi Yoo-kang		
2006	So In Love	Lee Hyeju		
2008	The Great King, Sejong	Hyebin Lady Yang		
2008	On Air	drama writer Yoon Se-ah	Cameo, Episode 21	
2008	Love Marriage	Seo Hwa-young		
2009	City Hall	Go Go-hae		
2009	Wife Returns	Min Seo-hyun		
2010	KBS Drama Special	Wang Joo-ri	Episode: "Family Secrets"	
2011	You're So Pretty	Go Yoo-rang		
2012	A Gentleman's Dignity	Hong Se-ra		
2012	My Lover, Madame Butterfly	Yoon Seol-ah		
2013	Gu Family Book	Yoon Seo-hwa	Cameo	
2014	KBS Drama Special	Kim Soon-ae	Episode: "The Dreamer"	
2015	Eve's Love	Jin Song-ah		
2017	My Sassy Girl	Queen Park		
2017	Stranger	Lee Yeon-jae	Season 1–2	
2017	Rain or Shine	Ma-ri		
2018	Nice Witch	Oh Tae-ri		
2018	Sky Castle	No Seung-hye		
2019	Melting Me Softly	Na Ha-yeong		
2020	KBS Drama Special	Woo Soo-min	Episode: "Crevasse"	
2021	The Road: The Tragedy of One	Seo Eun-soo		
2021	Snowdrop	Pi Seung-hee		
2023	Sweet Home 2	Seon-hwa		
2024	Hierarchy	An Hye-won		
2024	Perfect Family	Ha Eun-joo		
2025	Love Me	Jin Ja-young		
2026	Four Hands, Two Sonatas	Kang Ji-hye		

=== Television shows ===
Year	Title	Role	Notes	Ref.
2010	Chellah Chellah English Cooking	Host	Episode 1–7	
2011	Movie Holic	Host	Episode 1–11	
2012	We Got Married (season 4)	Cast member	Episode 131–159	
2015	Law of the Jungle in Palau	Cast member		
2019	Three Meals a Day: Mountain Village	Cast member	with Yum Jung-ah and Park So-dam	
2022	Heart Beats 38.5	Host		
2023	City Sashimi Restaurant	Hall manager		

=== Awards and nominations ===
Name of the award ceremony, year presented, category, nominee of the award, and the result of the nomination
Award ceremony	Year	Category	Nominee / Work	Result	Ref.
Baeksang Arts Awards	2019	Best Supporting Actress – Television	Sky Castle	Nominated	
KBS Drama Awards	2020	Best Actress in a One-Act/Special/Short Drama	Drama Special – Crevasse	Nominated	
Korean Film Awards	2005	Best New Actress	Blood Rain	Nominated	
MBC Drama Awards	2011	Excellence Award, Actress in a Serial Drama	You're So Pretty	Nominated	
MBC Entertainment Awards	2012	Best Newcomer in a Variety Show (Female)	We Got Married (season 4)	Won	
MBC Entertainment Awards	2012	Best Couple Award	Yoon Se-ah (with Julien Kang); We Got Married (season 4)	Nominated	
SBS Drama Awards	2005	New Star Award	Lovers in Prague	Won	
SBS Drama Awards	2009	Best Supporting Actress in a Drama Special	City Hall	Nominated	
SBS Drama Awards	2012	Excellence Award, Actress in a Weekend/Daily Drama	A Gentleman's Dignity	Nominated	
SBS Drama Awards	2018	Excellence Award, Actress in a Daily and Weekend Drama	Nice Witch	Nominated	
