= Seoul Vibe =

2022 film by Moon Hyun-sung

- Official release poster
- Hangul: 서울대작전
- Hanja: 서울大作戰
- RR: Seouldaejakjeon
- MR: Sŏuldaejakchŏn
- Directed by: Moon Hyun-sung
- Written by: Sua Shin
- Starring: Yoo Ah-in; Go Kyung-pyo; Lee Kyu-hyung; Park Ju-hyun; Ong Seong-wu
- Cinematography: Lim Won-geun
- Edited by: Heo Sun-mi
- Music by: Nene Kang; DJ Soulscape
- Production companies: Andmarq Studio; MCMC; United Artist Agency
- Distributed by: Netflix
- Release date: August 26, 2022
- Country: South Korea
- Language: Korean

Seoul Vibe (Korean: 서울대작전; RR: Seouldaejakjeon; lit. 'Seoul Grand Operation') is a 2022 South Korean action comedy film directed by Moon Hyun-sung from a story written by Sua Shin. The film stars an ensemble cast led by Yoo Ah-in, Go Kyung-pyo, Lee Kyu-hyung, Park Ju-hyun and Ong Seong-wu.

Seoul Vibe was released on Netflix on August 26, 2022.

== Plot ==
During the leadup to the 1988 Seoul Olympic Games, international smuggler and racer Park Dong-wook, along with his ragtag smuggling team of mechanics and drivers featuring Oh Woo-sam, Bok-nam, Park Yoon-hee and Joon-ki are blackmailed by prosecutor Ahn Pyung-wook to get into the good books of General Lee Hyun-kyun and Chairwoman Kang In-sook in order to extract information about the former government's secret fund. In exchange for doing this task, Pyung-wook would wipe out all their criminal records and refusing would result in lengthy jail time. In order to get close to Kang, they would have to disguise themselves as her drivers to transport the slush fund. Since all her drivers have been arrested, she has to recruit her new replacement in a car race, which is Pyung-wook recruits Dong-wook crew in the first place. Furthermore, Pyung-wook installs Woo-sam into Kang's nightclub as DJ to spy deeply into Kang's club.

Dong-wook team prevails in the car race with some sabotages and meets up with Kang. Kang offers 10 millions Won for each delivery under the conditions that they keep their mouth shut; they must not steal from her and each of them must pretend they are strangers during the whole deliveries to avoid suspicious. Dong-wook refuses the deal by chastising the reward is too low, causing Kang to impress with his boldness and rise the reward.

Lee Hyun-kyun is not impressed with the Dong-wook's attitude and set their car on fire to intimidate them. To make the deliveries smoothly, they enlist Pyung-wook to acquire cars and he shows them the garage of confiscated vehicles and they acquire three cars and modified them. The team delivers the slush fund smoothly and quickly gains Kang's trust. However, overtime, the deliveries are getting harder as the cops intensify the security of the smuggling route. Pyung-wook reveals to the group that the intensification of police is due to the crackdown by the upcoming regime on the previous corrupted government, which makes many previous officials of the old regime to start moving assets abroad amid the crackdowns.

Woo-sam then reveals that he manages to spot a secret room on top Kang's nightclub, which might hold the secret documents about the slush fund. During one delivery, Lee ambushes the group with two trucks and threats to kill them with a water gun to test their loyalty. After Dong-wook provokes Lee to shoot him, Lee drops his facade and congratulates them for passing the test and gives them a gold watch as reward but not before warning them not to cross him or Kang. Woo-sam comes to the group and reveals that he manage to seduce Kang's secretary and duplicate the key to the secret room. Shaken by Lee's threat on their life, Dong-wook decides to quit the job and cut ties with Pyung-wook even if is means risking jail time. Disheartened, Woo-sam angrily quits the team and goes to complete the mission on his own. However, the rest of the team quickly joins Woo-sam to complete the mission as they are not wanting to rot in jail but most of all, they do not want corrupted people like Kang to get away with her crimes after what the upper-class people did to their hometown.

Yoon-hee disguises as a maid and uses the key to the secret room and acquire the ledgers while Woo-sam triggers the building fire alarm to distract the security. Dong-wook joins in the group to complete the mission in the last minutes after reflecting on Woo-sam's words. As they come to deliver the ledgers to Pyung-wook, they are shock to find out that his office has been ransacked and Pyung-wook was thrown from the high floor to his dead. It turned out that, Lee never trust Dong-wook and his team even after the loyalty test and the gold watch he gave them as reward was actually a listening device, which enabling him to figure out that they are rats all along.

During the escape, Lee captures Woo-sam, and tortures him for information, while Dong-wook and the rest manage to escape but not before Lee burned down their hideout. Later on, they are being framed for Pyung-wook's murder. To counter-attack, Dong-wook meets up with Pyung-wook's superior to hand over the ledger as well as a mixtape that recorded a secret meeting between Kang and three corrupt officials. It is revealed that Kang plans to frame Lee for the secret funds and escape to the US with the money. He then meets up with Hyun-kyun and plays the recording of Kang's treachery to him. Dong-wook then makes a deal with Hyun-kyun to take down Kang in exchange for 1 billions Won reward while Hyun-kyun can keep the rest of Kang's slush fund and after that they can all escape to the United States. Hyun-kyun reluctantly agrees but he will put his men with them to ensure they do not backstab him.

Later, Dong-Wook recruits his car race rival Galchi and his minions by bribing them with rare and highly expensive Jordan 3 shoes that can be sold for hundreds thousands of Won. The plan essentially involves getting Lee and Kang in the same place and dragging them through the dirt. While Yoon-hee rescues Woo-sam, Dong-Wook, Joon-ki and Bok-nam takes Lee and his men on a wild goose chase, resulting in Lee crashes his car. As the prosecution office come to arrest him, he commits suicide by blowing up his car, unable to handle lengthy prison time. Dong-Wook boards the plane that Kang is on board, along with the car filled with the last goods and records Kang admitting her involvement in secret funds.

Kang tries to shoot down Dong-Wook, but Dong-Wook gets into his car, where he accidentally lodges its spoiler into the net holding all the money, and then drives out of the plane. Later, Dong-Wook successfully releases the parachute installed in the car and lands safely. After this, Kang has been arrested for corruption, while Dong-wook and his crew steal some of the illegal money for their hard work in order to "upgrade themselves" before moving for Los Angeles.

== Cast ==
=== Main ===
- Yoo Ah-in as Park Dong-wook
- Go Kyung-pyo as Oh Woo-sam, a DJ and Dong-wook's team member
- Lee Kyu-hyung as Bok-nam, Dong-wook's team member
- Park Ju-hyun as Park Yoon-hee, Dong-wook's younger sister and a team member
- Ong Seong-wu as Joon-ki, Dong-wook's team member

=== Supporting ===
- Moon So-ri as Kang In-sook, a very influential figure of the underground economy
- Kim Sung-kyun as Lee Hyun-kyun, the right-hand man of Chairwoman Kang
- Oh Jung-se as Ahn Pyung-wook, a prosecutor
- Jung Woong-in as Chief Prosecutor
- Song Min-ho as Galchi
- Chun-sik as Galchi's subordinate
- Kim Chae-eun as Kim Yoon-jae, the secretary of Chairwoman Kang

=== Special appearance ===
- Yoon Kyung-ho as Mr. Yoon
- Lee Se-young as a cinema employee

== Production ==
In December 2020, it was first revealed that production company Andmarq Studio planned to produce upcoming film Seoul Vibe with actors Yoo Ah-in and Go Yoon-jung. MCMC and UAA joined the production with Netflix distributing the film. In June 2021, Seoul Vibe confirmed production with ensemble casting of Yoo Ah-in, Go Kyung-pyo, Park Ju-hyun, Lee Kyu-hyung, Ong Seong-wu, Kim Sung-kyun, Jung Woong-in, Moon So-ri, and Song Min-ho. Filming has begun in Eurwang-dong, Jung-gu, Incheon, in August 2021. It was halted twice in August and November 2021 due to the film staff's and Go Kyung-pyo's COVID-19 tests came out positive, and resumed filming in December 2021.

== Release ==
Seoul Vibe was released on Netflix on August 26, 2022.
