= Choi Byung-mo =

South Korean actor

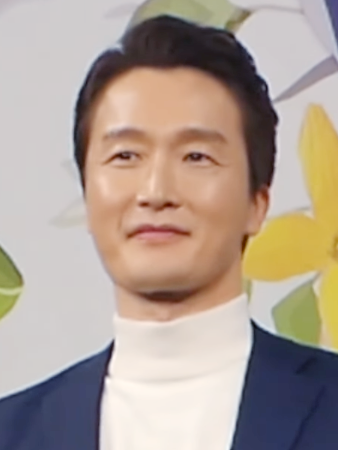
- Choi in January 2019
- Born: January 14, 1972 (age 54); South Korea
- Occupation: Actor
- Years active: 2003–present
- Spouse: Lee Gyu-in (m. 2017)

Korean name
- Hangul: 최병모
- RR: Choe Byeongmo
- MR: Ch'oe Pyŏngmo

Choi Byung-mo (born January 14, 1972) is a South Korean actor.

== Personal life ==
On June 19, 2017, Choi got married with popera singer Kiriel Lee Gyu-in (birth name Lee Gyu-in) after one year and a half of dating, the wedding ceremony was held at a place in Gangnam, Seoul.

== Filmography ==
=== Film ===
Year	Title	Role	Ref.
2003	The First Amendment of Korea	Jegal Bong	
2013	Flu	Choi Dong-chi	
2013	Marriage Blue	Married man at wedding hall	
2014	The Plan Man	Juror 1	
2014	Confession	Jae-gyu	
2015	Gangnam Blues	Section chief Moon	
2015	Untouchable Lawman	Head of inspectors	
2015	Office	Human resources director	
2015	The Exclusive: Beat the Devil's Tattoo	Radio DJ	
2016	The Great Actor	Director	
2016	Phantom Detective		
2016	The Handmaiden	Audience member during reading 2	
2016	Proof of Innocence	Department head Jang	
2016	Take Off 2	Go Young-ja's husband	
2016	Asura: The City of Madness	Inspector Oh	
2017	Warriors of the Dawn	Eunuch Nam	
2017	The Merciless	Captain Choi	
2018	Herstory	Soon-mo	
2018	The Negotiation	Gong Je-gi	
2021	Mission: Possible	Team leader Cha Oh	
2021	On the Line	Chief Park	
2022	Men of Plastic	Jo Tae-cheon	
2023	12.12: The Day	Do Hee-cheol	

=== Television series ===
Year	Title	Role	Ref.
2014	Reset		
2015	The Missing	Kim Young-geun	
2015	My Beautiful Bride	Secretary Kim	
2015	Yong-pal	Department head Min	
2016	Ready for Start - Vol. 1	Director Jo Hyun-cheol	
2016	Local Hero		
2016	The Master of Revenge	Ahn Joong-yong	
2016	Another Miss Oh	Park Soon-taek	
2016	The Good Wife	Lee Jong-in	
2016	Moon Lovers: Scarlet Heart Ryeo	Park Young-gyu	
2017	Introverted Boss	Famous planning PT presenter (guest appearance)	
2017	Stranger	Kim Woo-gyoon	
2017	KBS Drama Special – Let Us Meet	Yoshida	
2017	Avengers Social Club	Lee Byung-soo	
2018	The Miracle We Met	Ttak-pool	
2018	Are You Human?	Choi Sang-gook	
2018	The Smile Has Left Your Eyes	Lee Kyung-cheol	
2018	The Third Charm	Designer Hong	
2019	Spring Turns to Spring	Park Yoon-cheol	
2020	Money Game	Na Joon-pyo	
2020	Flower of Evil	Do Min-seok	
2020	SF8	TBA	
2021	The Penthouse: War in Life 2	Detective (guest appearance)	
2022	Our Blues	Jong-woo	
2025	A Head Coach's Turnover	Director Choi	

=== Web series ===
Year	Title	Role	Notes	Ref.
2023	Shadow Detective	Deputy chief	Season 2	

== Theatre ==
Year	English title	Korean title	Role
2006	Suspense Hamlet	서스펜스 햄릿	
2008	Dr. Yirabu	닥터 이라부	
2008 – 2009	I Would Like to See	보고싶습니다	
2010 – 2012	3 Days and 2 Nights with My Mother	친정엄마와 2박3일	
2012	Unforgettable	잊을 수 없는	Woo-jin
