= Lee Kyu-hyung =

South Korean actor

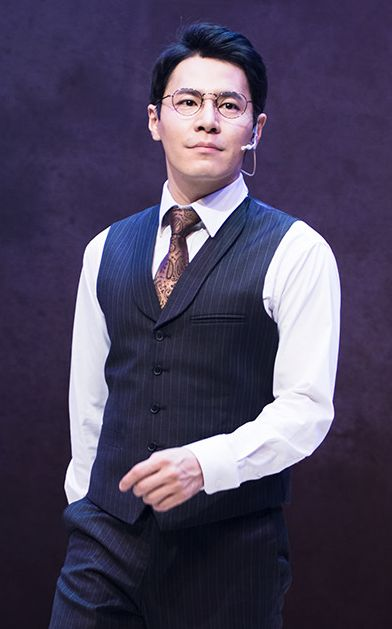
- Lee in 2016
- Born: November 29, 1983 (age 42); South Korea
- Education: Joongdong High School; Dongguk University
- Occupation: Actor
- Years active: 2001–present
- Agent: Ace Factory

Korean name
- Hangul: 이규형
- RR: I Gyuhyeong
- MR: I Kyuhyŏng

Lee Kyu-hyung (Korean: 이규형; born November 29, 1983) is a South Korean actor. Though primarily a musical actor, Lee has also appeared in a variety of Korean films and dramas. In 2017, Lee shot to fame with his portrayal of Yoo Han-yang in tvN's television series Prison Playbook (2017). He is well known for portraying a wide spectrum of roles on stage and screen.

== Early life ==
Lee was born on November 29, 1983, in Seoul, South Korea.

His family consists of his parents and an older sister.

Lee's interest in acting was inspired by the 1999 Korean film Shiri, and he began to pursue roles in theater in hopes of becoming a movie star.

Lee attended Joongdong High School in Seoul, where he was a part of the theatre club.

He was accepted into Kyung Hee University's film and theatre department, but dropped out before completing his degree and later graduated from Dongguk University with a major in Theater Studies. Lee made the decision to transfer to Dongguk as it was the alma mater of Choi Min-sik, an actor he admired.

== Career ==
Lee Kyu-hyung began his acting career in the Seoul Metropolitan Police Agency's "Whistle Theater" whilst attending college and completing his mandatory military service. After graduating, he continued to act in theater, as well as appearing in musicals.

Lee made his film debut in 2001 with a minor role in the movie Kick the Moon. He has since starred in various plays and musicals, most notably with recurring roles in Laundry, Fan Letter, and Gloomy Day.

In 2013, he appeared in the film The Face Reader after receiving a phone call from a friend that the actor slated to appear had a flat tire and couldn't come to set.

In 2017, he played the role of Yoon Se-won, chief of the prosecution's investigation team, in the tvN drama Stranger, raising his profile. He was then cast as Yoo Han-yang, a second-generation tycoon serving in prison for drug use, in tvN's television series Prison Playbook (2017). Director Shin Won-ho and writer Lee Woo-jung asked him to audition for the role after seeing his performances in the play Come See Me and the musical Fan Letter. Many viewers connected to his portrayal of the role, showcasing both cute and serious sides of the character, and it led to an increase in popularity for the actor both in Korea and overseas. Speaking about the character's homosexuality, Lee expressed an awareness of homophobia in Korean society, but stated that he hoped his portrayal of the character could show a simple, human love that audiences could support.

Lee was nominated for Best Supporting Actor at the 3rd Korean Musical Awards for his role as D'Ysquith in the 2018 production of the musical A Gentleman's Guide to Love and Murder. The role required him to play nine different members of the D'Ysquith family, with rapid costume changes throughout the performance.

In 2019, Lee appeared as the titular character in the CJ Entertainment production of the musical Cyrano, alongside musical actors Ryu Jung-han, Choi Jae-woong, and Jo Hyung-gyun. The production was met with praise, and was lauded as an improvement from the 2017 production, due in part to the various charms of its leading actors. Following his appearance in Cyrano, Lee starred as Hedwig in the rock musical Hedwig and the Angry Inch, receiving critical acclaim for the powerful vocal performance and skillful acting. In November 2019, Lee reprised his role as the writer Kim Hae-jin in the musical Fan Letter, a Korean musical set during Japanese occupation in the 1930s. Lee also played the role of Son Seok-ki in Doctor John.

In 2020, Lee is slated to appear in the film Stellar, a fantasy comic drama. In 2022, he starred in the South Korean series, All of Us Are Dead.

Lee has played the titular role of Shakespeare in the play Shakespeare in Love in second half of 2025.

== Filmography ==
=== Film ===
Key
†	Denotes films that have not yet been released

Year	Title	Role	Notes	Ref.
2001	Kick The Moon			
2009	Large and Small City			
2009	Castaway on the Moon	Emergency worker		
2013	The Face Reader	New eunuch		
2013	Cat Girl	Min-hyeok		
2014	No Tears for the Dead	Ventura Holdings team member 5		
2014	The Wicked	Jae-wook		
2014	My Dictator	Cheol-ju		
2015	Love Copyright			
2015	You Call It Passion	Young-hwa		
2016	Seondal: The Man Who Sells the River	Chief officer at tobacco guard post		
2019	Innocent Witness	Hee-joong		
2019	Romang	Traffic police	Cameo	
2019	Juror 8	Rehabilitation committee member		
2020	Diva	Diving coach		
2021	Handsome Guys	Nam Sun Kyung		
2021	A Year-End Medley	Prophet	Special appearance; TVING Fim	
2022	Stellar	Dong-sik		
2022	Seoul Vibe	Bok-nam	Netflix Film	
2023	Noryang: Deadly Sea	Arima Harunobu		
2024	Handsome Guys	Nam Sun-kyung		
2025	Boss	Tae-gyu		

=== Television series ===
Year	Title	Role	Notes	Ref.
2015	Unkind Ladies	Jung Ma-ri's senior		
2017	Hwarang: The Poet Warrior Youth	Do-go		
2017	Guardian: The Lonely and Great God	Lee Jung-hwa's husband	Cameo (episode 11)	
2017–20	Stranger	Yoon Se-won	Supporting (season 1); Cameo (season 2; episode 5 and 16)	
2017–18	Prison Playbook	Yoo Han-yang		
2018	Life	Ye Seon-woo		
2019	Doctor John	Son Seok-ki		
2020	Hi Bye, Mama!	Jo Gang-hwa		
2020	Tale of the Nine Tailed	Governor	Cameo (episode 6, 15)	
2021	Hospital Playlist	Yoo Han-yang	Cameo (season 2, episode 3)	
2021	Voice	Dong Bang-min	Season 4	
2021	The Witch's Diner	single father	Cameo (Episode 1)	
2021	Racket Boys	Park Jung-hwan	Cameo (episode 16)	
2021	Would You Like a Cup of Coffee?	Seong-min	Cameo (Episode 3)	
2021	Happiness	Lee Seung-young	Cameo (Episode 1–3, 8, 12)	
2022	All of Us Are Dead	Song Jae-Ik		
2022	May It Please the Court	Jwa Si-baek		
2022	Big Bet	young Cha Mu-sik	Cameo	
2024	Uncle Samsik	Kang Seong-min		
2025	Kick Kick Kick Kick	Jo Young-sik		
2026	Mousetrap	Sun-yong		

=== Television shows ===
Year	Title	Role	Notes	Ref.
2022	Besties in Wonderland	Cast Member		

== Theater ==
Year	title	Role	Ref.
2007	Heartbeat	Endlessly Lonely Man	
2008	Heartbeat	Endlessy Lonely Man	
2009	Laundry	Sol Rong-Go	
2010	Laundry	Sol Rong-Go	
2010	Singles	Lim Jung-Joon	
2011	Audition'	Park Byung-Tae	
2011	Laundry	Sol Rong-Go	
2012	Oh! While You Were Sleeping	Choi Byung-Ho	
2013	The March of Youth	Wang Gyeong-Tae	
2013	Laundry	Sol Rong-Go	
2013	Triangle	Do Yeon	
2013	Gloomy Day	Man	
2014	My Bucket List	Gang Gu	
2014	Beastie Boys	Lee Jae-hyun	
2014	Gloomy Day	Man	
2015	The Great Gatsby [Re:Boot]	Ha Un-do	
2015	The Goddess is Watching	Sin Seok-gu	
2015	Death's Hymn	Man	
2015	My Bucket List	Gang-gu	
2015	Abboccato	Yu Jae-min	
2016	Fan Letter	Kim Hae-jin	
2016	Beastie	Lee Seung-woo	
2016	Secretly and with Greatness	Won Ryu-hwan	
2017	Fan Letter	Kim Hae-jin	
2017	Death's Hymn	Man	
2018	A Gentleman's Guide to Love and Murder	D'Ysquith	
2019	Cyrano	Cyrano de Bergerac	
2019	Hedwig and the Angry Inch	Hedwig	
2019	Fan Letter	Kim Hae-jin	
2020	A Gentleman's Guide to Love and Murder	D'Ysquith	
2021	Hedwig and the Angry Inch	Hedwig/Tommy	
2021–2022	Fan Letter (musical)	Kim Hae-jin	
2021–2022	A Gentleman's Guide to Love and Murder	D'Ysquith	
2022	Crash Landing on You	Ri Jeong-hyuk	
2022–2023	Sweeney Todd	Sweeney Todd	
2023	Monte Cristo	Edmond Dantes	
2025	Shakespeare in Love	Shakespeare	

== Awards and nominations ==
Name of the award ceremony, year presented, category, nominee of the award, and the result of the nomination
Award ceremony	Year	Category	Nominee / Work	Result	Ref.
Baeksang Arts Awards	2018	Best New Actor – Television	Stranger	Nominated	
Blue Dragon Series Awards	2024	Best Supporting Actor	Uncle Samsik	Nominated	
Korea Drama Awards	2019	Excellence Award, Actor	Doctor John	Won	
Korea Musical Awards	2019	Best Male Supporting Actor	Gentleman's Guide	Nominated	
SBS Drama Awards	2019	Excellence Award in Miniseries (Actor)	Doctor John	Nominated	
