= Stranger (TV series) =

2017 South Korean TV series

- Promotional poster for the first season
- Also known as: Forest of Secrets
- Hangul: 비밀의 숲
- Hanja: 祕密의 숲
- Lit.: Secret Forest
- RR: Bimirui sup
- MR: Pimirŭi sup
- Genre: Crime; Drama; Thriller
- Created by: Lee Soo-yeon
- Written by: Lee Soo-yeon
- Directed by: Ahn Gil-ho (Season 1); Yoo Je-won (Season 1); Park Hyun-suk (Season 2)
- Creative directors: Kim Suk-won; Kim Sung-kyoon
- Starring: Cho Seung-woo; Bae Doona; Lee Joon-hyuk; Yoo Jae-myung; Shin Hye-sun; Jeon Hye-jin; Choi Moo-sung; Yoon Se-ah
- Music by: Kim Joon-seok; Jeong Se-rin
- Opening theme: Stranger
- Country of origin: South Korea
- Original language: Korean
- No. of seasons: 2
- No. of episodes: 32 (list of episodes)

Production
- Executive producers: Lee Chan-ho; Min Hyun-il; Go Byung-chul; Lee Sung-jin
- Producers: Park Eun-kyung; Seo Jae-hyun
- Cinematography: Jang Jong-kyung
- Editor: Kim Na-young
- Camera setup: Single-camera
- Running time: 63–86 minutes
- Production companies: Signal Entertainment Group; IOK Media; Ace Factory (Season 2)

Original release
- Network: tvN
- Release: June 10, 2017 – October 4, 2020

Related
- Dongjae, the Good or the Bastard (2024)

Stranger (Korean: 비밀의 숲), also titled The Forest of Secrets, is a South Korean crime thriller television series created by Choi Jin-hee and written by Lee Soo-yeon. Consisting of two seasons of sixteen episodes each that first aired in 2017 and 2020 respectively on tvN, it was written solely by Lee Soo-yeon, with Ahn Gil-ho and Yoo Je-won acting as directors for season 1, and Park Hyun-suk for season 2.

Both seasons feature Cho Seung-woo and Bae Doona as a prosecutor and a policewoman whose dedication and relentless pursuit of the truth lead them to form an unlikely alliance dedicated to exposing criminals, including the corrupt officials within their own respective organizations. It co-stars Lee Joon-hyuk, Yoo Jae-myung, Shin Hye-sun, Yoon Se-ah, Jeon Hye-jin and Choi Moo-sung among a large cast of characters mostly belonging to the Ministry of Justice or South Korean police.

The series was a hit with both domestic and international viewers, and received favorable reviews for its tight plot, gripping sequences and strong performances. It was featured on the New York Times list of Best TV Shows of 2017, and won several awards including the Grand Prize for television at the Baeksang Arts Awards. A spinoff series focused on Lee Joon-hyuk's character, titled Dongjae, the Good or the Bastard, premiered in 2024.

== Synopsis ==
In the first season, Hwang Si-mok (Cho Seung-woo) is an exemplary prosecutor who suffers from hypersensitivity to certain sound frequencies. After undergoing corrective surgery, he lost his sense of empathy and lacks social skills. While investigating a murder, he meets Police Lieutenant Han Yeo-jin (Bae Doona), who assists his efforts to solve the case. As they begin to unravel the mystery behind the murder, they find that their efforts are continually being obstructed by participants in a major corruption conspiracy between the Prosecutors' Office and a private chaebol (conglomerate).

In the second season, set two years later, a dispute arises between the Prosecutors' Office and the National Police Agency, with the former wanting control over all investigative proceedings while the latter seeks autonomous authority to conduct investigations. In the midst of their respective agencies' conflict, Hwang Si-mok and Han Yeo-jin team up to conduct their own independent investigation of a concealed case.

== Cast and characters ==
- Cho Seung-woo as Hwang Si-mok
- Bae Doona as Han Yeo-jin
- Lee Joon-hyuk as Seo Dong-jae
- Yoo Jae-myung as Lee Chang-joon (season 1; guest season 2)
- Shin Hye-sun as Young Eun-soo (season 1; guest season 2)
- Yoon Se-ah as Lee Yeon-jae (season 2; recurring season 1)
- Jeon Hye-jin as Choi Bit (season 2)
- Choi Moo-sung as Woo Tae-ha (season 2)

== Episodes ==
Season	Episodes	Originally released		Ave. South Korea viewers (millions)
Season	Episodes	First released	Last released	Ave. South Korea viewers (millions)
1	16	June 10, 2017	July 30, 2017	—N/a (Note: The number of viewers was released by Nielsen Media Research starting January 2018.)
2	16	August 15, 2020	October 4, 2020	1.774

== Production ==
=== Development ===
The entire series was written by Lee Soo-yeon who was inspired by the Korean adage "We cannot rule those who want nothing" to create the character of Si-mok. Ahn Gil-ho directed the majority of the first season with the assistance of Yoo Je-won, while Park Hyun-seok took over the filming duties for the second season. Unlike usual South Korean dramas, the series was developed as a potential multi-seasonal program, with most of the filming have already been pre-produced prior to its broadcast.

=== Casting ===
In January 2017, Cho Seung-woo and Bae Doona were offered the lead roles. The same month Shin Hye-sun was added to the cast. It was the first television drama Cho Seung-woo had accepted since God's Gift - 14 Days in 2014, after venturing into musical theatre for seven years. For the second season, cast members Cho Seung-woo, Bae Doona, Lee Joon-hyuk and Yoon Se-ah, were all confirmed to reprise their roles. Jeon Hye-jin and Choi Moo-sung were also confirmed to join the lead cast in January 2020.

=== Filming ===
Filming of the first season began in April 2017, preceded by the first script reading with the cast at the CJ E&M Center in Seoul. Script reading for the second season took place in January 2020.

=== Music ===
Stranger (Original Television Soundtrack)

Soundtrack album by Various artists
- Released: September 13, 2017
- Genre: Soundtrack
- Length: 157 minutes
- Languages: Korean; English
- Labels: Mog; Kakao M; Universal Music Korea

An accompanying soundtrack compilation to Stranger was released by Mog Communications and Kakao M on September 13, 2017, in South Korea. It was later reissued by Universal Music Group in overseas markets on May 11, 2018. A three-disc album, the latter two discs features music composed by Kim Jun-seok and Jung Se-rin for the program. Ten songs were released from the soundtrack as singles in numbered parts from June to July 2017: "끝도없이 (Ad Infinitum)" by Richard Parkers, "먼지 (Dust)" Everlua, "소나기 (Downpour)" by Oohyo, "괴물처럼 (Monster Like)" by Tei, "웃어요 (Smile)" by Han Hee Jung & Sorae, the titular track "비밀의 숲 (Stranger)" by Yoon Do-hyun, "사랑할 것 처럼 (As if to Love)" by Kim Kookheon of Myteen, "물결 (A Billow)" by Yein of Lovelyz, "굿바이 잘가요 (Goodbye)"/"Back in Time" by Peter Han, and "묻는다 (Ask)" by Jung Won-bo of NeighBro & Jun Sang-geun. Of these, the songs "소나기 (Downpour)" and "사랑할 것 처럼 (As if to Love)" have managed to enter the South Korean Gaon BGM Music Chart at numbers 80 and 79, respectively.

Stranger soundtrack track listing

Season 1 soundtrack

Disc 1
No.	Title	Artist	Length
1.	"끝도없이" (Ad Infinitum)	Richard Parkers	4:02
2.	"먼지" (Dust)	EverLua	4:43
3.	"소나기" (Downpour)	Oohyo	4:43
4.	"괴물처럼" (Monster Like)	Tei	3:52
5.	"웃어요" (Smile)	Han Hee-jung & Sorae	3:34
6.	"비밀의 숲" (Stranger)	Yoon Do-hyun	3:20
7.	"사랑할 것 처럼" (As if to Love)	Kim Kook-heon of Myteen	4:10
8.	"물결" (A Billow)	Yein of Lovelyz	3:01
9.	"굿바이 잘가요" (Goodbye)	Peter Han	3:46
10.	"묻는다" (Ask)	Jung Won-bo of NeighBro & Jun Sang-geun	3:48
11.	"Back in Time"	Peter Han	3:46

Disc 2
No.	Title	Composer	Length
1.	"비밀의숲" (Stranger)	Kim Jun-seok	4:26
2.	"사라지는 비밀" (Secret to Disappear)	Ju In-ro	2:42
3.	"끝을 알 수 없는 사건" (Unsolved Case)	Go Bon-chun	2:44
4.	"시초가 되는 나무" (From Root to Tree)	Jung Se-rin	2:54
5.	"범행 장소" (Scene of Crime)	Go Bon-chun	3:23
6.	"설계된 진실" (Designed Truth)	Kim Jun-seok	4:19
7.	"공허한 단서" (Empty Clue)	Ju In-ro	3:30
8.	"적폐 침묵의 대가" (The Price of Silence)	Jung Se-rin	2:46
9.	"후회" (Regret)	Lee Yoon-ji	1:46
10.	"법불아귀" (Law)	Lee Roo-ri	3:00
11.	"황시목의 적" (The Enemy Inside)	No Yoo-rim	3:00
12.	"수사 브리핑" (Investigation Briefing)	Lee Roo-ri	3:21
13.	"범인의 흔적" (Criminal's Trace)	Lee Yoon-ji	1:51
14.	"범행의 의도" (Criminal Intent)	Kim Hyun-do	2:37
15.	"심문" (Interrogation)	Kim Hyun-joo	2:50
16.	"그날, 그 시간" (That Day, That Time)	Jung Se-rin	2:19
17.	"잃어버린 길" (Lost Way)	Kim Jun-seok	3:45
18.	"스며드는 감정" (Infiltration)	Lee Roo-ri	2:33
19.	"어둠 속의 추리" (Reasoning in Darkness)	Kim Jun-seok	3:44

Disc 3
No.	Title	Composer	Length
1.	"용의자" (The Suspect)	Kim Jun-seok	3:01
2.	"무감각의 시선" (An Insensitive Gaze)	Jung Se-rin	2:59
3.	"썩은 뿌리" (Rotten Roots)	Kim Jun-seok	4:04
4.	"추격" (The Chase)	Ju In-ro	3:12
5.	"용의자의 행적" (Suspect)	Lee Roo-ri	2:48
6.	"감춰진 증거" (Hidden Evidence)	Go Bon-chun	2:36
7.	"사건의 줄기" (Stem of the Incident)	Kim Jun-seok	2:55
8.	"내부이탈자" (Insider)	Kim Hyun-do	2:50
9.	"수상한 낌새" (Suspicious Secrets)	Lee Yoon-ji	3:44
10.	"흔들리는 마음" (Feelings)	Lee Yoon-ji	3:33
11.	"덫" (Trap)	Kim Jun-seok	3:50
12.	"흐릿한 감정" (Hazy Emotion)	Lee Yoon-ji	3:46
13.	"보이지 않는 손" (Invisible Hand)	Kim Hyun-joo	2:22
14.	"되돌릴 수만 있다면" (If Only I Can Get It Back)	Jung Se-rin	1:56
15.	"신경전" (War of Nerves)	No Yoo-rim	2:19
16.	"내부의 적" (The Enemy Inside)	Kim Hyun-do	3:22
17.	"알리바이" (Alibi)	Kim Hyun-joo	2:24
18.	"배려" (Consideration)	Lee Yoon-ji	1:41
19.	"어릴 적 상처" (The Wounds of Childhood)	Jung Se-rin	2:46

Season 2 soundtrack
Overture

Released on August 13, 2020
No.	Title	Music	Artist	Length
1.	"Stranger" (비밀의 숲)	Kim Jun-seok; Go Bon-chun	Kim Jun-seok	4:25
Total length:				4:25

Part 1

Released on August 16, 2020
No.	Title	Lyrics	Music	Artist	Length
1.	"Crisis"	Kim Beom-joo; Kim Si-hyuk	Kim Beom-joo; Kim Si-hyuk	Sunwoo Jung-a	3:26
2.	"Crisis" (Inst.)		Kim Beom-joo; Kim Si-hyuk		3:26
Total length:					6:52

Part 2

Released on August 29, 2020
No.	Title	Lyrics	Music	Artist	Length
1.	"In This Silence" (침목)	Kim Ho-kyung	1601	Ha Hyun-woo of Guckkasten	4:27
2.	"In This Silence" (침목) (Inst.)		1601		4:27
Total length:					8:54

Part 3

Released on September 5, 2020
No.	Title	Lyrics	Music	Artist	Length
1.	"Wish" (바람)	Gaho; KAVE	Gaho; KAVE	Gaho	3:32
2.	"Wish" (바람) (Inst.)		Gaho; KAVE		3:32
Total length:					7:04

Part 4

Released on September 12, 2020
No.	Title	Lyrics	Music	Artist	Length
1.	"Another Door" (또 다른 문)	Seo Dong-seong	Lee Yoon-chan; Uncle Sam	Lee Yoon-chan	3:48
2.	"Another Door" (또 다른 문) (Inst.)		Lee Yoon-chan; Uncle Sam		3:48
Total length:					7:44

== Release ==
The pilot episode of Stranger aired on June 10, 2017, on tvN, replacing Chicago Typewriter. Netflix secured the worldwide streaming rights for the series for US$200,000 per episode, except in Korea and China, and released them in simultaneous broadcast with tvN as a Netflix original program. The Korea Times reported that Bae Doona, who had previously appeared in the Netflix original series Sense8, proved to be crucial in the purchase of the drama. tvN affiliate tvN Asia also aired the program in selected Asian markets beginning on June 16, 2018. A second season was commissioned by tvN, set to be released with Netflix on the same day. It premiered on August 15, 2020, replacing It's Okay to Not Be Okay.

== Reception ==
=== Critical response ===
In an article by columnist Dena Daw for Screen Rant, Stranger was described as a "domestic and international success". Though ratings-wise, the program was not a "smash hit", pundits and audiences praised it as a "league of its own". Korean culture critic Ha Jae-geun described the character as a "fantasy that was borne out of a time of distrust". In her review for The Korea Times, columnist Park Jin-hai commended the writing as "finely intertwined", and wrote that audiences gave a strong response to this "drama for thinking people". The New York Times listed the series in tenth place as their The Best TV Shows of 2017.

At the 54th Baeksang Arts Awards, the series received eight nominations, including two considerations for Grand Prize for Television, winning one for the whole series. Cho Seung-woo and Lee Soo-yeon also won Best Television Actor and Best Television Screenplay, respectively. In a Gallup Korea poll, audiences aged 19 and above selected Stranger as their 12th favorite show in July 2017. While Google Korea listed the series as the ninth most-searched television program of 2017.

=== Viewership ===
According to data published by Nielsen Korea, the pilot episode of the series was seen by 3.041% of total nationwide viewers, in metropolitan Seoul, it earned 3.2% rating, which made it the highest-rated program of the day among non-terrestrial channel programs. The program achieved its highest rating on the first-season finale, earning 6.568% nationwide rating and a 7.622% rating within Seoul-based viewers. On average, it was seen by 4.562% of total viewership. On the TNmS rating system, the series premiered with a 3.2% rating and ended its first season with a 7.1% rating. The last episode recorded noticeably a strong rating performances as it took the lead rating for the first time against hit variety show Hyori's Homestay that aired in same time slot and became the highest rated program of the day among non-terrestrial channel programs.

Stranger : South Korea viewers per episode (millions)

Season	Episode number																Average
Season	1	2	3	4	5	6	7	8	9	10	11	12	13	14	15	16	Average
2	1.915	1.676	1.759	1.690	1.576	1.626	1.476	1.790	1.802	1.719	1.742	1.750	1.730	2.017	1.928	2.186	1.774

Source: Audience measurement performed nationwide by Nielsen Media Research.

Average TV viewership ratings (season 1)
Ep.	Original broadcast date	Average audience share		
Ep.	Original broadcast date	AGB Nielsen		TNmS
Ep.	Original broadcast date	Nationwide	Seoul	Nationwide
1	June 10, 2017	3.041%	3.627%	3.2%
2	June 11, 2017	4.148%	5.498%	4.0%
3	June 17, 2017	4.088%	4.420%	3.6%
4	June 18, 2017	4.170%	4.923%	4.5%
5	June 24, 2017	4.064%	5.203%	3.7%
6	June 25, 2017	4.082%	5.174%	3.9%
7	July 1, 2017	4.389%	4.888%	4.0%
8	July 2, 2017	4.154%	5.237%	4.6%
9	July 8, 2017	4.319%	5.506%	4.3%
10	July 9, 2017	4.834%	6.434%	4.6%
11	July 15, 2017	4.733%	5.709%	5.0%
12	July 16, 2017	5.511%	6.875%	5.0%
13	July 22, 2017	4.451%	5.582%	4.4%
14	July 23, 2017	5.447%	7.125%	6.0%
15	July 29, 2017	4.993%	6.240%	5.1%
16	July 30, 2017	6.568%	7.622%	7.1%
Average		4.562%	5.629%	4.6%
In the table above, the blue numbers represent the lowest ratings and the red numbers represent the highest ratings.

Average TV viewership ratings (season 2)
Ep.	Original broadcast date	Average audience share (AGB Nielsen)	
Ep.	Original broadcast date	Nationwide	Seoul
1	August 15, 2020	7.627% (1st)	9.102% (1st)
2	August 16, 2020	6.415% (1st)	7.585% (1st)
3	August 22, 2020	7.014% (1st)	8.190% (1st)
4	August 23, 2020	6.442% (1st)	7.378% (1st)
5	August 29, 2020	6.041% (1st)	7.070% (1st)
6	August 30, 2020	6.281% (1st)	7.487% (1st)
7	September 5, 2020	6.502% (1st)	6.950% (1st)
8	September 6, 2020	7.493% (1st)	8.856% (1st)
9	September 12, 2020	7.190% (1st)	8.553% (1st)
10	September 13, 2020	7.203% (1st)	8.031% (1st)
11	September 19, 2020	6.843% (1st)	8.017% (1st)
12	September 20, 2020	7.458% (1st)	8.707% (1st)
13	September 26, 2020	7.179% (1st)	7.755% (1st)
14	September 27, 2020	8.837% (1st)	10.312% (1st)
15	October 3, 2020	8.307% (1st)	9.589% (1st)
16	October 4, 2020	9.408% (1st)	11.039% (1st)
Average		7.265%	8.414%
In the table above, the blue numbers represent the lowest ratings and the red numbers represent the highest ratings.

== Awards and nominations ==
Year	Award	Category	Nominee	Result	Ref.
2017	1st Seoul Awards	Grand Prize (Daesang)	Stranger	Won	
2017	1st Seoul Awards	Best Actor	Cho Seung-woo	Nominated	
2017	1st Seoul Awards	Best New Actress	Shin Hye-sun	Nominated	
2018	54th Baeksang Arts Awards	Grand Prize (Daesang)	Stranger	Won	
2018	54th Baeksang Arts Awards	Grand Prize (Daesang)	Cho Seung-woo	Nominated	
2018	54th Baeksang Arts Awards	Best Drama	Stranger	Nominated	
2018	54th Baeksang Arts Awards	Best Director	Ahn Gil-ho	Nominated	
2018	54th Baeksang Arts Awards	Best Actor	Cho Seung-woo	Won	
2018	54th Baeksang Arts Awards	Best Supporting Actor	Yoo Jae-myung	Nominated	
2018	54th Baeksang Arts Awards	Best Screenplay	Lee Soo-yeon	Won	
2018	54th Baeksang Arts Awards	Best New Actor	Lee Kyu-hyung	Nominated	

== See also ==
- List of highest-rated dramas in South Korean cable television
