= List of South Korean films of 2018 =

The following is a list of South Korean films that were released in theaters in 2018.

== Box office ==
The highest-grossing South Korean films released in 2018, by domestic box office gross revenue, are as follows:

Highest-grossing films released in 2018
Rank	Title	Distributor	Domestic gross
1	Along with the Gods: The Last 49 Days	Lotte Cultureworks	$83,396,423
2	The Great Battle	Next Entertainment World	$37,639,706
3	Intimate Strangers	Lotte Cultureworks	$36,027,434
4	Believer	Next Entertainment World	$35,320,688
5	The Spy Gone North	CJ Entertainment	$34,759,333
6	Dark Figure of Crime	Showbox	$26,801,755
7	Default	CJ Entertainment	$25,092,037
8	Keys to the Heart	CJ Entertainment	$22,300,975
9	The Witch: Part 1. The Subversion	Warner Bros. Korea	$22,126,405
10	The Accidental Detective 2: In Action	CJ Entertainment	$21,856,331

== Released ==
Released	English title	Native title	Director(s)	Cast
January 11	Bittersweet Brew	스타박'스 다방	Lee Sang-woo	Baek Sung-hyun, Lee Sang-ah, Seo Shin-ae
January 17	Brothers in Heaven	돌아와요 부산항애	Park Hee-jun	Sung Hoon, Jo Han-sun
January 17	Keys to the Heart	그것만이 내 세상	Choi Sung-hyun	Lee Byung-hun, Youn Yuh-jung, Park Jung-min
January 24	Be-Bop-A-Lula	비밥바룰라	Lee Seong-jae	Park In-hwan, Shin Goo, Im Hyun-sik
January 24	The Discloser	1급기밀	Hong Ki-seon	Kim Sang-kyung, Kim Ok-bin, Choi Moo-sung
January 31	Jamsil	누에치던 방	Lee Wan-min	Lee Sang-hee, Hong Seung-yi, Kim Sae-byuk
January 31	Psychokinesis	염력	Yeon Sang-ho	Ryu Seung-ryong, Shim Eun-kyung, Park Jung-min
February 8	Detective K: Secret of the Living Dead	조선명탐정: 흡혈괴마의 비밀	Kim Seok-yoon	Kim Myung-min, Oh Dal-su, Kim Ji-won
February 8	Turning Mecards W: Secret of Bandain	터닝메카드W: 반다인의 비밀 특별판	Hong Heon-pyo	Yoon Mi-na, Lee Hyun-jin
February 14	Golden Slumber	골든 슬럼버	Noh Dong-seok	Kang Dong-won, Kim Eui-sung, Han Hyo-joo, Kim Sung-kyun, Kim Dae-myung
February 14	Heung-boo: The Revolutionist	흥부	Cho Geun-hyun	Jung Woo, Kim Joo-hyuk, Jung Jin-young, Jung Hae-in
February 22	In Between Seasons	환절기	Lee Dong-eun	Bae Jong-ok, Lee Won-geun, Park Won-sang
February 28	The Princess and the Matchmaker	궁합	Hong Chang-pyo	Shim Eun-kyung, Lee Seung-gi, Kim Sang-kyung, Yeon Woo-jin, Kang Min-hyuk
February 28	Little Forest	리틀 포레스트	Yim Soon-rye	Kim Tae-ri, Ryu Jun-yeol, Jin Ki-joo, Moon So-ri
February 28	Gate	게이트	Shin Jai-ho	Jung Ryeo-won, Im Chang-jung, Lee Geung-young
March 7	The Vanished	사라진 밤	Lee Chang-hee	Kim Sang-kyung, Kim Kang-woo, Kim Hee-ae
March 8	Wretches	괴물들	Kim Baek-joon	Lee Won-geun, Lee Yi-kyung, Park Kyu-young
March 14	Be with You	지금 만나러 갑니다	Lee Jang-hoon	So Ji-sub, Son Ye-jin, Kim Ji-hwan
March 14	Cheese in the Trap	치즈인더트랩	Kim Jae-young	Park Hae-jin, Oh Yeon-seo, Park Ki-woong
March 22	A Field Day	운동회	Kim Jin-tae	Kim Su-an, Yang Ji-woong, Lee Jung-bi
March 22	Microhabitat	소공녀	Jeon Go-woon	Esom, Ahn Jae-hong
March 22	Taklamakan	타클라마칸	Ko Eun-ki	Jo Sung-ha, Ha Yoon-kyung
March 28	Gonjiam: Haunted Asylum	곤지암	Jung Bum-shik	Wi Ha-joon, Park Ji-hyun, Oh Ah-yeon, Moon Ye-won
March 28	Seven Years of Night	7년의 밤	Choo Chang-min	Ryu Seung-ryong, Jang Dong-gun
March 31	Meet the Memories - First Love	기억을 만나다	Goo Bum-seok	Seo Ye-ji, Kim Jung-hyun
April 5	Stand by Me	덕구	Bang Soo-in	Lee Soon-jae, Jung Ji-hoon, Jang Gwang
April 5	What a Man Wants	바람 바람 바람	Lee Byung-hun	Lee Sung-min, Shin Ha-kyun, Song Ji-hyo, Lee El
April 12	A Tiger in Winter	호랑이보다 무서운 겨울손님	Lee Kwang-kuk	Go Hyun-jung, Lee Jin-wook, Seo Hyun-woo, Ryu Hyun-kyung
April 12	Eyelids	눈꺼풀	O Muel	Moon Seok-beom, Sung Min-chul, Lee Sang-hee
April 12	Intention	그날, 바다	Kim Ji-young	Jung Woo-sung
April 12	Snatch Up	머니백	Heo Joon-hyung	Kim Mu-yeol, Park Hee-soon, Lee Geung-young
April 19	Duck Town	수성못	Yu Ji-young	Lee Se-young, Kim Hyun-joon
April 19	Mothers	당신의 부탁	Lee Dong-eun	Im Soo-jung, Yoon Chan-young, Lee Sang-hee
April 19	Marionette	나를 기억해	Lee Han-wook	Lee Yoo-young, Kim Hee-won
April 25	True Fiction	살인소설	Kim Jin-muk	Ji Hyun-woo, Oh Man-seok, Lee Eun-woo
May 1	Champion	챔피언	Kim Yong-wan	Ma Dong-seok, Kwon Yul, Han Ye-ri
May 9	Love+Sling	레슬러	Kim Dae-woong	Yoo Hae-jin, Kim Min-jae, Lee Sung-kyung
May 16	The March for the Lost	임을 위한 행진곡	Park Ki-bok	Kim Kkot-bi, Kim Bu-seon
May 17	Burning	버닝	Lee Chang-dong	Yoo Ah-in, Steven Yeun, Jeon Jong-seo
May 22	Believer	독전	Lee Hae-young	Cho Jin-woong, Ryu Jun-yeol, Kim Joo-hyuk
May 30	Deja Vu	데자뷰	Ko Kyung-min	Nam Gyu-ri, Lee Chun-hee, Lee Kyu-han
May 30	Home	홈	Kim Jong-woo	Lee Hyo-je, Heo Joon-seok
June 13	The Accidental Detective 2: In Action	탐정: 리턴즈	Lee Eon-hee	Kwon Sang-woo, Sung Dong-il, Lee Kwang-soo
June 20	Student A	여중생A	Lee Kyung-sub	Kim Hwan-hee, Kim Joon-myun
June 21	Loser's Adventure	튼튼이의 모험	Ko Bong-soo	Kim Choong-gil, Baek Seung-hwan, Shin Min-jae
June 27	Herstory	허스토리	Min Kyu-dong	Kim Hee-ae, Kim Hae-sook
June 27	The Witch: Part 1. The Subversion	마녀	Park Hoon-jung	Kim Da-mi, Jo Min-su, Choi Woo-shik, Park Hee-soon
June 28	I Have a Date with a Spring	나와 봄날의 약속	Baek Seung-bin	Kim Sung-kyun, Jang Young-nam, Kang Ha-neul
July 4	Sunset in My Hometown	변산	Lee Joon-ik	Park Jung-min, Kim Go-eun
July 12	The Soup	식구	Im Young-hoon	Shin Jung-geun, Yoon Park
July 13	The Whispering	속닥속닥	Choi Sang-hoon	So Joo-yeon, Kim Min-kyu, Kim Young
July 19	Land of Happiness	행복의 나라	Jung Min-kyu	Ji Yong-suk, Ye Soo-jung, Kim Si-eun, Gi Ju-bong
July 25	The Haunted House: The Secret of the Cave	신비아파트: 금빛 도깨비와 비밀의 동굴	Kim Byung-gab	Jo Hyeon-jeong, Kim Young-eun, Kim Chae-ha, Shin-Woo Shin
July 25	Illang: The Wolf Brigade	인랑	Kim Jee-woon	Gang Dong-won, Han Hyo-joo, Jung Woo-sung
August 1	Along with the Gods: The Last 49 Days	신과함께: 인과 연	Kim Yong-hwa	Ha Jung-woo, Ju Ji-hoon, Kim Hyang-gi, Ma Dong-seok
July 24	Bad Boss	나쁜 상사	Baek Jong-seok	Kim Jang, Kim Seo-young, Jung Mi-suk
August 8	The Spy Gone North	공작	Yoon Jong-bin	Hwang Jung-min, Lee Sung-min, Cho Jin-woong, Ju Ji-hoon
August 15	The Witness	목격자	Jo Kyu-jang	Lee Sung-min, Kim Sang-ho, Kwak Si-yang
August 22	On Your Wedding Day	너의 결혼식	Lee Seok-geun	Park Bo-young, Kim Young-kwang
August 23	Adulthood	어른도감	Kim In-sun	Uhm Tae-goo, Lee Jae-in, Seo Jeong-yeon
August 29	High Society	상류사회	Byun Hyuk	Park Hae-il, Soo Ae
August 30	Last Child	살아남은 아이	Shin Dong-suk	Choi Moo-sung, Kim Yeo-jin, Lee David
September 6	Deep	딥	Jo Sung-kyu	Choi Yeo-jin, Ryu Seung-soo
September 12	Monstrum	물괴	Heo Jong-ho	Kim Myung-min, Kim In-kwon, Lee Hye-ri, Choi Woo-shik
September 13	After My Death	죄 많은 소녀	Kim Ui-seok	Jeon Yeo-been, Seo Young-hwa, Ko Won-hee
September 19	Fengshui	명당	Park Hee-gon	Cho Seung-woo, Ji Sung, Kim Sung-kyun, Baek Yoon-sik, Moon Chae-won
September 19	The Great Battle	안시성	Kim Kwang-sik	Jo In-sung, Nam Joo-hyuk, Park Sung-woong
September 19	The Negotiation	협상	Lee Jong-seok	Son Ye-jin, Hyun Bin
September 26	The Soul-Mate	원더풀 고스트	Jo Won-hee	Ma Dong-seok, Kim Young-kwang, Lee Yoo-young
October 3	Dark Figure of Crime	암수살인	Kim Tae-kyun	Kim Yoon-seok, Ju Ji-hoon
October 8	Beautiful Vampire	뷰티풀 뱀파이어	Jeong Eun-gyeong	Jung Yeon-joo, Song Kang
October 11	Miss Baek	미쓰백	Lee Ji-won	Han Ji-min, Kim Shi-ah, Lee Hee-joon
October 18	Too Hot to Die	배반의 장미	Park Jin-young	Kim In-kwon, Jung Sang-hoon, Son Dam-bi, Kim Sung-cheol
October 25	Grass	풀잎들	Hong Sang-soo	Kim Min-hee, Jung Jin-young, Gi Ju-bong
October 25	Passing Summer	늦여름	Jo Sung-kyu	Im Won-hee, Jeon Seok-ho, Shin So-yul, Jung Yeon-joo
October 25	Rampant	창궐	Kim Sung-hoon	Hyun Bin, Jang Dong-gun
October 31	Intimate Strangers	완벽한 타인	Lee Jae-kyoo	Yoo Hae-jin, Cho Jin-woong, Lee Seo-jin, Yum Jung-ah
November 7	The Villagers	동네사람들	Im Jin-soon	Ma Dong-seok, Kim Sae-ron, Lee Sang-yeob
November 8	Ode to the Goose	군산: 거위를 노래하다	Zhang Lü	Park Hae-il, Moon So-ri, Jung Jin-young, Park So-dam
November 8	The Wrath	여곡성	Yoo Young-sun	Seo Young-hee, Son Na-eun, Park Min-ji, Lee Tae-ri
November 14	Unfinished	출국	Noh Gyu-yeob	Lee Beom-soo, Yeon Woo-jin, Lee Jong-hyuk
November 15	Happy Together	해피 투게더	Kim Jung-hwan	Park Sung-woong, Song Sae-byeok, Han Sang-hyuk
November 21	Beautiful Days	뷰티풀 데이즈	Yoon Jae-ho	Lee Na-young, Jang Dong-yoon, Oh Kwang-rok
November 22	Unstoppable	성난황소	Kim Min-ho	Ma Dong-seok, Song Ji-hyo
November 22	Youngju	영주	Cha Sung-duk	Kim Hyang-gi, Kim Ho-jung
November 28	Default	국가부도의 날	Choi Kook-hee	Kim Hye-soo, Yoo Ah-in, Huh Joon-ho, Jo Woo-jin, Vincent Cassel
November 28	Fantasy of the Girls	소녀의 세계	Ahn Jung-min	Roh Jeong-eui, Cho Soo-hyang, Kwon Na-ra
December 5	Door Lock	도어락	Lee Kwon	Gong Hyo-jin, Kim Ye-won, Kim Sung-oh
December 6	Revenger	리벤져	Lee Seung-won	Bruce Khan, Park Hee-soon, Yoon Jin-seo, Kim In-kwon
December 19	The Drug King	마약왕	Woo Min-ho	Song Kang-ho, Jo Jung-suk, Bae Doona
December 19	Swing Kids	스윙키즈	Kang Hyeong-cheol	Do Kyung-soo, Park Hye-soo, Oh Jung-se
December 26	Take Point	PMC: 더 벙커	Kim Byung-woo	Ha Jung-woo, Lee Sun-kyun, Jennifer Ehle
