= 28th Buil Film Awards =

2019 edition of award ceremony

- Date: October 4, 2019
- Site: Busan Dream Theatre, Nam-gu, Busan
- Hosted by: Kim Hyun-wook; Lee In-hye

The 28th Buil Film Awards (Korean: 제28회 부일영화상) ceremony was hosted by the Busan-based daily newspaper Busan Ilbo. It was held on October 4, 2019, at the Busan Dream Theatre in Busan and was emceed by presenter Kim Hyun-wook and actress Lee In-hye.

== Nominations and winners ==
Complete list of nominees and winners:

(Winners denoted in bold)

Best Film	Best Director
**Parasite**; Dark Figure of Crime; Hotel by the River; Ode to the Goose; Night and Fog in Zona	**Kim Tae-gyun** – **Dark Figure of Crime**; Bong Joon-ho – Parasite; Hong Sang-soo – Hotel by the River; Jung Sung-il – Night and Fog in Zona; Lee Byeong-heon – Extreme Job
Best Actor	Best Actress
**Gi Ju-bong** – **Hotel by the River**; Choi Woo-shik – Parasite; Han Suk-kyu – Idol; Ju Ji-hoon – Dark Figure of Crime; Sul Kyung-gu – Birthday	**Jeon Do-yeon** – **Birthday**; Cho Yeo-jeong – Parasite; Chun Woo-hee – Idol; Han Ji-min – Miss Baek; Kim Hyang-gi – Innocent Witness
Best Supporting Actor	Best Supporting Actress
**Park Myung-hoon** – **Parasite**; Choi Moo-sung – Last Child; Jin Seon-kyu – Extreme Job; Kang Ki-young – Exit; Kim Min-ho – Swing Kids	**Lee Jung-eun** – **Parasite**; Esom – Inseparable Bros; Jang Hye-jin – Parasite; Kim Sae-byuk – Grass; Kwon So-hyun – Miss Baek
Best New Actor	Best New Actress
**Sung Yu-bin** – **Last Child**; Gong Myung – Extreme Job; Kim Min-ho – Swing Kids; Kwak Min-gyu – Back from the Beat; Nam Joo-hyuk – The Great Battle	**Jeon Yeo-been** – **After My Death**; Jo Min-kyung – February; Kim Hye-jun – Another Child; Lee Jae-in – Svaha: The Sixth Finger; Park Hye-su – Swing Kids
Best New Director	Best Screenplay
**Kim Ui-seok** – **After My Death**; Kang Sang-woo – Kim-Gun; Lee Ji-won – Miss Baek; Lee Jong-eon – Birthday; Shin Dong-seok – Last Child	**Bong Joon-ho** and **Han Jin-won** – **Parasite**; Kwak Kyung-taek and Kim Tae-gyun – Dark Figure of Crime; Lee Sang-geun – Exit; Moon Choong-il – Extreme Job; Shin Dong-seok – Last Child
Best Cinematography	Best Art Direction
**Hong Kyung-pyo** – **Parasite**; Hwang Gi-seok – Dark Figure of Crime; Kim Byung-seo – Take Point; Kim Hyung-goo – Hotel by the River; Nam Dong-geun – The Great Battle	**Park Il-hyun** – **Swing Kids**; Kim Byung-han – Take Point; Lee Ha-joon – Parasite; Ryu Sung-hee – The King's Letters; Yoon Dae-won – The Great Battle
Best Music	Popular Star Award
**Jung Jae-il** – **Parasite**; Dalpalan – Hotel by the River; Kim Joon-seok and Goo Bon-choon – Swing Kids; Kim Tae-seong – Idol; Kim Tae-seong – Svaha: The Sixth Finger	**Do Kyung-soo** – **Swing Kids**; **Im Yoon-ah** – **Exit**
Yu Hyun-mok Film Arts Award
**Jung Sung-il** – **Night and Fog in Zona**
