= 6th Wildflower Film Awards =

2019 edition of award ceremony

- Date: April 12, 2019
- Site: Literature House, Seoul

The 6th Wildflower Film Awards (Korean: 제6회 들꽃영화상) is an awards ceremony recognizing the achievements of Korean independent and low-budget films. It was held at the Literature House in Seoul on April 12, 2019.

This year, nominees were selected from a list of 57 fiction films and 26 documentaries that were released in the calendar year 2018. For the first time, cash prizes of KRW20 million won ($18,000) were also given to all awards recipients sponsored by retail chain e-mart.

== Nominations and winners ==
(Winners denoted in bold)

Grand Prize
**The Remnants**
Best Director (Narrative Films)	Best Director (Documentaries)
**Jeon Go-woon** – **Microhabitat**; Hong Sang-soo – Grass; Kim Ui-seok – After My Death; Lee Dong-eun – Mothers; O Muel – Eyelids; Shin Dong-seok – Last Child; Zhang Lü – Ode to the Goose	**Jung Sung-il** – **Night and Fog in Zona**; Kim Il-ran and Lee Hyuk-sang – The Remnants; Kwon Kyung-won – Courtesy to the Nation; Park Bae-il – Soseongri; Yoon Jae-ho – Mrs.B. A North Korean Woman
Best Actor	Best Actress
**Sung Yu-bin** – **Last Child**; Choi Moo-sung – Last Child; Ji Hyun-woo – True Fiction; Kim Choong-gil – Loser's Adventure; Lee Hyo-je – Home; Uhm Tae-goo – Adulthood	**Esom** – **Microhabitat**; Jang Ri-woo – A Blue Mouthed Face; Jeon Yeo-been – After My Death; Kim Ga-hee – Park Hwa-young; Kim Min-hee – Grass; Lee Sang-hee – Jamsil
Best Screenplay	Best Cinematography
**Shin Dong-seok** – **Last Child**; Baek Seung-bin and other – I Have a Date with Spring; Jeon Go-woon – Microhabitat; Kim Ui-seok – After My Death; Kim Soo-jeong – A Blue Mouthed Face	**Kim Jong-seon** – **Beautiful Days**; Baek Sung-bin – After My Death; Jo Young-jik – Ode to the Goose; Kim Tae-soo – Microhabitat; Sung Min-cheol and O Muel – Eyelids
Best Music	Lifetime Achievement Award
**Jung Chae-woong** – **Eyelids**; Goo Ja-wan – I Have a Date with Spring; Sunwoo Jung-a – After My Death	**Kwak Yong-soo**
Best New Director (Narrative Films)	Best New Director (Documentaries)
**Kim Ui-seok** – **After My Death**; Jang Woo-jin – Autumn, Autumn; Jeon Go-woon – Microhabitat; Kim In-seon – Adulthood; Kim Soo-jeong – A Blue Mouthed Face; Shin Dong-seok – Last Child	**Kim Bo-ram** – **For Vagina's Sake**; Jang Hye-young – Grown Up; Kwon Kyung-won – Courtesy to the Nation; Lee Mario – The Black; Yoon Jae-ho – Mrs.B. A North Korean Woman
Best New Actor/Actress	Best Supporting Actor/Actress
**Lee Jae-in** – **Adulthood**; Choi Joon-young – Saem; Kim Ga-hee – Park Hwa-young; Roh Jeong-eui – Fantasy of the Girls; Sung Yu-bin – Last Child; Yoon Chan-young – Mothers	**Kim Sae-byuk** – **Grass**; Jin Yong-wook – A Blue Mouthed Face; Lee Ji-won – Omok Girl
