= Two Doors =

Two doors
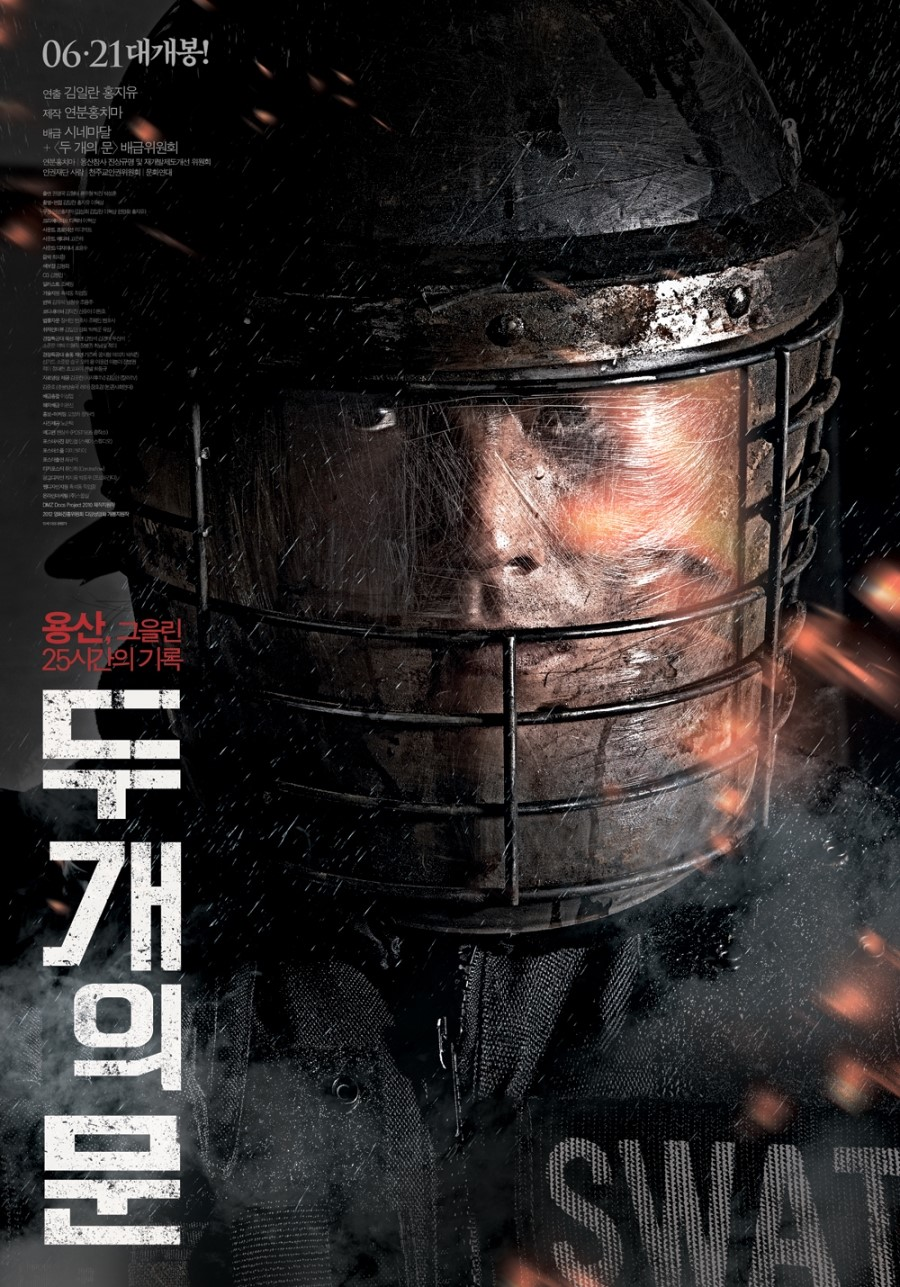
- Directed by: Kim il-rhan, Hong Ji-you
- Produced by: Yonbunhongchima
- Edited by: Kim il-rhan, Hong Ji-you
- Music by: Pyo Yong Soo
- Distributed by: Cinema Dal
- Release date: June 21, 2012
- Running time: 101 minutes
- Country: South Korea
- Language: Korean

Two Doors (Korean: 두개의 문) is a Korean documentary film that covers the 2009 Yongsan Tragedy, which resulted in the death of five evictees and one police commando.

The evictees, who were cornered into climbing up a steel watchtower to appeal for their right to live, came back down as cold corpses only 25 hours after they started building the tower. Those who survived became law offenders. A long battle for the truth started as the police statement accused the evictees for causing the tragedy by carrying firebombs up the tower for an illegal and violent protest while on the other side criticism voiced that the governmental authority's excessive use of force had aggravated the tragedy. After the tragedy, the survivors were immediately sent to trial while none of the officials responsible for the repression was investigated. Bolstered by the justice system and government, the police department held back investigation records from the defendants' lawyers and the public, and the prosecutors sided with the police department. The heightened tension between the two parties and opposite views of the truth led to the judgment of the government and the eradication of illegal and violent protests by a decision from the court.

== See also ==
- The Remnants
