= Cloud, Encore =

- Film poster
- Directed by: Jung Sung-il
- Starring: Im Kwon-taek
- Edited by: Jung Sung-il
- Distributed by: M-Line Distribution
- Release dates: October 8, 2018 (BIFF); December 26, 2019 (South Korea)
- Running time: 166 minutes
- Country: South Korea
- Language: Korean

Cloud, Encore (Korean: 백두 번째 구름) is a 2018 South Korean documentary film directed by Jung Sung-il. Shot in 2012 while Korean filmmaker Im Kwon-taek began filming his 102nd feature Revivre (2014), it reveals the secrets of the movie master from beginning to end. It made its world premiere at the 23rd Busan International Film Festival in 2018.

This is Jung's third feature and his second work on a filmmaker, the first being Night and Fog in Zona (2015) on Chinese documentary filmmaker Wang Bing.

== Cast ==
- Im Kwon-taek

== Production ==
The director confessed that the making of the film "took longer than (he) thought."
