= LTNS (TV series) =

2024 South Korean television series

- Promotional poster
- Also known as: Long Time No Sex
- Hangul: 엘티엔에스
- RR: Eltieneseu
- MR: Elt'ienesŭ
- Genre: Black comedy; Satire
- Written by: Lim Dae-hyung; Jeon Go-woon
- Directed by: Lim Dae-hyung; Jeon Go-woon
- Starring: Esom; Ahn Jae-hong
- Music by: Kim Joon-won
- Country of origin: South Korea
- Original language: Korean
- No. of episodes: 6

Production
- Executive producer: Kim Jae-hee
- Producers: Ahn Eun-mi; Lee Je-deok
- Cinematography: Lee Yong-gap
- Editor: Lee Young-rim
- Running time: 53–63 minutes
- Production companies: Barunson Studios; LTNS Cultural Industry Co., Ltd.

Original release
- Network: TVING
- Release: January 19 – February 1, 2024

LTNS (Korean: 엘티엔에스; an acronym for Long Time No Sex) is a South Korean black comedy satirical television series written and directed by Lim Dae-hyung and Jeon Go-woon, and starring Esom and Ahn Jae-hong. It is about an estranged couple looking back on their relationship. It was released on TVING from January 19, 2024 to February 1, 2024, every Thursday at 12:00 (KST). It is also available for streaming on Viki and Viu in selected regions.

LTNS premiered at the On Screen section of the 28th Busan International Film Festival on October 4, 2023, where two of six episodes were screened.

== Premise ==
An estranged couple, Woo Jin and Rim Park Samuel, hunt down cheating couples to make money. Jin tries to restore their relationship.

== Cast and characters ==
=== Main ===
- Esom as Woo Jin

A soft-hearted woman beneath her goal-oriented and aggressive exterior. She is a hotelier who endures the daily grind at the front desk of a three-star hotel, accidentally discovers the secret of her friend's couple and changes the direction of her life, deciding to live badly in the face of an offer she can't refuse.

- Ahn Jae-hong as Rim Park Samuel

A gentle man who harbors a latent rage beneath the surface. He graduated from a prestigious university and joined a large company with ease, but after acquiring a mental illness, he left the company and became a taxi driver.

=== Supporting ===
- Lee Hak-joo as Jeong-su

Samuel's friend.

- Kim Sae-byuk as Se-yeon

Jeong-su's wife.

- Kim Woo-gyeom as Byeong-woo

A bank clerk.

- Jung Jae-won as Ga-young

An office worker.

- Jung Jin-young as Baek-ho

Stone shop owner.

- Yang Mal-bok as Yeong-ae
- Hwang Hyun-bin as Su-ji

=== Special appearances ===
- Nam Mi-jung as Real estate agent
- Park Jeong-soo
- Lee Sung-wook
- Bong Tae-gyu

== Production ==
=== Development ===
Director Lim Dae-hyung, who has worked on the film Moonlit Winter (2019) and director Jeon Go-woon, who has worked on the film Microhabitat (2017), served as both the writers and directors of the series, and produced by Barunson Studios and LTNS Cultural Industry Co., Ltd.

=== Casting ===
On March 22, 2023, Esom and Ahn Jae-hong were confirmed as the main cast of the series. This was also their third time to work together in a project and second time with director Jeon.

== Release ==
The series was released on TVING on January 19, 2024, at 12:00 (KST) with two episodes released every Thursday. It is also available to stream on Viki and Viu with subtitles.

== Accolades ==
=== Awards and nominations ===
Name of the award ceremony, year presented, category, nominee of the award, and the result of the nomination
| Award ceremony | Year | Category | Nominee / Work | Result | Ref. |
|---|---|---|---|---|---|
| Asia Contents Awards & Global OTT Awards | 2024 | Best Director | Lim Dae-hyung, Jeon Go-woon | Nominated | |
| Baeksang Arts Awards | 2024 | Best Screenplay | Lim Dae-hyung, Jeon Go-woon | Nominated | |
| Blue Dragon Series Awards | 2024 | Best Drama | LTNS | Nominated | |
| Blue Dragon Series Awards | 2024 | Best Actress | Esom | Nominated | |

=== Listicles ===
Name of publisher, year listed, name of listicle, and placement
| Publisher | Year | Listicle | Placement | Ref. |
|---|---|---|---|---|
| Cine21 | 2024 | Top 10 Series of 2024 | 2nd place | |
| South China Morning Post | 2024 | The 15 best K-dramas of 2024 | 2nd place | |
