= Kim Sa-i =

Korean poet

Kim Sa-i (Korean: 김사이, born 1971) is a South Korean poet. Departing from the pre-existing poetry about labor whose emphasis is on its purpose, she writes poems that fully represent the life experiences of the working people. Especially, her interest lies in the structural alienation of women workers engendered by patriarchy. Being a former laborer herself, she continues to participate in activism to support the working people.

== Life ==
Kim was born in Haenam, South Jeolla Province, South Korea in 1971. She left her hometown and worked at the Guro Industrial Complex in Seoul. By joining the Literary Society of Workers in Guro, she first learned about poetry. Her career as a poet began after she published her poem "Seoreun yeoseotsal kkot (서른여섯 살 꽃, 36-Year-Old Flower)" in the summer edition of the literary journal Poetry Review. Her first poetry collection Banseonghada geumandun nal (반성하다 그만둔 날, The Day I Stopped Self-Reflection), published in 2008, was nominated for the Book of the Year Award for the Best Literary Work, held by the newsweekly Sisain.

She has actively engaged in the Korean society, contributing columns on current events to newspapers, taking part in themed anthologies, and visiting labor movement sites in support. In 2007, she joined the group of artists Realist 100, which pursues anti-capitalistic activities. Later, she worked at the Korean Contingent Workers Center in 2012. Her second poetry collection Naneun amugeotdo an hago itdago handa (나는 아무것도 안 하고 있다고 한다, They Say I'm Doing Nothing) came out in 2018.

== Writing ==
Since the early 2000s, Kim has written poems full of her own experiences, such as leaving her hometown and living as a worker in the city. Unlike the conventional poems about the working people dominated by abstract ideas, her poetry contains their specific living experiences. She especially focuses on the undervaluation of work done by women, who are suffering from the double hardships stemming from insecure working environments and gender inequalities of the patriarchy. Her strong sense of self as a woman worker has developed her identification and solidarity with immigrant workers who are marginalized in the society. As such, she explores the possibility of poetry as a political means to represent the matters of the society at hand, and considers, through literature, the structural contradictions that bring about poverty.

Banseonghada geumandun nal (2008)

The expression 'stopping self-reflection' in the title of this poetry collection signifies the poet's changed attitude of facing reality in which it is difficult to offer an alternative to capitalism and refusing to blindly pursue the liberation of the working class. The poems are mostly set in Garibong-dong and the Guro Industrial Complex in Seoul, which were the center of the Korean labor movement and labor literature from the 1970s to the 1980s. However, they transformed into the capital of consumerism from the 1990s with the opening of high-end outlet malls in the area. She focuses on the changed appearance of the Guro Industrial Complex and simultaneously portrays it as a dark side of the metropolis, Seoul. In addition, the workers in this poetry collection are not described as an abstract concept like the agents of labor movement, but as realistic individuals who live their hard lives. Her poetry presents a new possibility for labor literature, which has declined since the mid-1990s.

Naneun amugeotdo an hago itdago handa (2018)

Kim's first poetry collection is entitled "The Day I Stopped Self-Reflection," but in her second book, she resumes self-reflection. In the poem "Dasi banseong-eul hamyeo (다시 반성을 하며, I Reflect Myself Again)," she suggests that, despite the reality being far from optimistic, she cannot give up her will to change the society in order to protect human dignity. Her self-reflection now goes beyond a pessimistic viewpoint and turns into her determination to delve deeper into the alienation of workers.

Above all, this poetry collection questions the ideology of patriarchy and the structural inequality which undervalues the work done by women. Impoverished women workers are exhausted from earning their livelihood and doing housework, deprived of their political right to express themselves, and invisible in political discourses. Her poetry regards both women workers and immigrant workers as minorities and seeks solidarity between the two.

== Major works ==
=== Poetry collections ===
《반성하다 그만둔 날》, 실천문학사, 2008 / Banseonghada geumandun nal (The Day I Stopped Self-Reflection), Silcheon Munhaksa, 2008

《나는 아무것도 안 하고 있다고 한다》, 창비, 2018 / Naneun amugeotdo an hago itdago handa (They Say I'm Doing Nothing), Changbi, 2018

=== Themed anthologies ===
<하루>, 백무산, 조정환, 맹문재 외, 《완전에 가까운 결단》, 갈무리, 2009

(전태일 열사 탄생 60주년 기념) / "Haru (A day)," Baek Mu-san, Jo Jeonghwan, Maeng Moonjae et al., Wanjeone gakkaun gyeoldan (Determination Close to Perfection), Galmuri, 2009 (Anthology commemorating the 60th birthday of the labor activist Chun Tae-il)

<숨을 쉴 수가 없어>, 작가선언 6.9, 《지금 내리실 역은 용산참사역입니다》, 실천문학사, 2009 (2009 용산참사 헌정문집) / "Sumeul shwilsuga eobseo (I Can't Breathe)," Announcement of Writers 6.9, Jigeum naerisil yeogeun yongsanchamsa yeogimnida (This Stop is Yongsan Disaster), Shilcheon Munhaksa, 2009 (Anthology dedicated to the Yongsan disaster of 2009)

<어떤 인사>, 고은, 강은교, 곽재구 외, 《우리 모두가 세월호였다》, 실천문학사, 2014 / "Eoddeon insa (Certain Greeting)," Ko un, Kang Unkyo, Kwak Jae-gu et al., Uri moduga sewolho yeotda (We Were All in the Sewol Ferry), Silcheon Munhaksa, 2014

<그 날>, 신경림, 백무산, 나희덕 외, 《언제까지고 우리는 너희를 멀리 보낼 수가 없다》, 걷는사람, 2019. (세월호 참사 5주기 추모시집) / "Geu nal (The Day)," Shin Kyeong-nim, Baek Mu-san, Ra Heeduk et al., Eonjekkajigo urineun neohuireul meolli bonael suga eopda (We Cannot Let You Go So Far Anymore), Geotneun Saram, 2019 (Anthology commemorating the fifth anniversary of the Sewol ferry disaster)
