= The Remnants =

- Directed by: Il-rhan Kim, Hyuk-sang Lee
- Produced by: Il-rhan Kim, Hyuk-sang Lee
- Cinematography: Hyuk-sang Lee
- Edited by: Il-rhan Kim, Hyuk-sang Lee
- Music by: Eui-kyoung Choi
- Release date: 2016
- Running time: 133 mins
- Country: South Korea
- Language: Korean

The Remnants (Korean: 공동정범) is a Korean Documentary film on the aftermath of 2009 Yongsan Tragedy by the same director of Two Doors. While Two Doors focuses on the compel of authoritative forces on the evictees, The Remnants dives in the life of the protesters after their release from the jail and scrutinizes the interpersonal relationships among them.

== Background: The Yongsan Tragedy ==
On January 20, 2009, after failing to appeal to the government for protection against loss of homes and businesses, around 40 renters occupied an abandoned 4-story building in Yongsan District to protest against the insufficient compensation, as a result of urban redevelopment. The police department swiftly despatched the SWAT team without prior run-through of the action or verbal negotiation with the protestors and the police was only equipped with one crane, one pump fire truck, and no air mattresses. The protesters were in possession of incendiary materials and a few of them were throwing down Molotov cocktails in response to the police deployment. During the clash between protestors and the police, a fire broke out and eventually took the life of five protestors and one police officer.

== Film synopsis ==
Unsatisfied with the compensation of relocation offered by the government, a group of protestors made up of renters and small business owners organized a sit-in demonstration on the abandoned building. The demonstration soon called the attention of the local police force, and the riot police was deployed to repress the protest. The riot police used water cannon to expel the evictees but failed as the protesters ran into a lookout built prior to the demonstration. The SWAT team quickly reacted to this action by attempting to enter the building from the rooftop. One of the evictee reacted by throwing oil down at the police who was using cutting tools and producing sparkles, in the hope of discouraging them. The oil quickly inflamed and a fire broke out inside and outside the lookout, causing the death of five evictees and one police officer. The protestors were brought to trial and sentenced to jail for four years.

Besides the unstated facts, the documentary film focuses heavily on the personal life, the reunion and the conflicts of the evictees after their release.

== Captured Evictees ==
Ju-hwan Kim: Kim lived by himself and had serious drinking problems as a defense mechanism to get away from the traumatic memory. Kim was the person who was in charge of building the lookout and later admitted in the film that he dropped a firebomb, which didn't led to the fire contrary to what the police initially suggested.

Chang-su Kim: After the release, Kim found out that his wife had cancer during his time in jail and faced the suspicion from his daughter on his integrity, which made him image the life he would have if he did not participate in the demonstration. Kim was also one of the protestors who urged to reunite the evictees and form a support system within themselves.

Chung-yeon Lee: Lee was the chair of the committee of evictee before the tragedy and opened a new bar after his release. He had been actively participating in civil rights demonstrations across the nation by himself since the release for the tragedy to be remembered and equity to be restored. Yet all he got out of the demonstrations were frustration and infuriation from the misunderstandings and opposition from the other evictees. Lee's father also died in the tragedy and Lee said that he had long been remorseful for jumping off the building by himself first after pushing away his father.

Seok-jun Ji: Ji feels extremely traumatized by the incident as he could still hear the sounds and voices from that night and oftentimes had to cure his sorrow and fear with alcohol. Ji is one of the most active evictees in organizing a reunion and starting a support group for the evictees as he believed that the mental insurity could be alleviated by talking to people who had gone through the same tragedy.

Ju-seok Chun: Chun was heavily injured after the tragedy and had been living off the belief that two of the other evictees who died in the incident helped him escape and he must pursue and restore justice for the two evictees. However, at the end of the movie when all five evictees gathered together to rewatch a video from the night, Chun found out that he was not helped by the two other evictees who he long believed to have saved his life.

== Festivals and awards ==
The film received the following awards:

- 2016, The Association of Korean Independent Film & Video
- 2016, Best Korean Independent Film Awarded
- 2016, The 8th DMZ Korean International Film Festival Best Korean Documentary Award and Audience Award
- 2016, The 21st Busan International Film Festival
- 2016, The Seoul Independent Film Festival
- 2019, 6th Wildflower Film Awards: Grand Prize

== Controversy and Policy Implication ==
The controversy on Yongsan tragedy lies not only in the unpreparedness and recklessness of the police action, but also in the biased judicial judgment and its violation to human rights. While the protestors were sent to jail, all police officers were related government official were exonerated. The trial result showed a perception of the protesters as “urban terrorists” but not “victims of forced eviction”. Despite the resistance of the National Human Rights Commission in Korea to take actions against the trial result, the UN Committee on Economic and Social Rights agitated the Korean government to entrench sufficient compensation and fair relocation for the evictees. On January 31, 2018, five protesters from Yongsan Tragedy were pardoned from jail by the president. On the same evening, a cultural protest claiming to advocate for the underrepresented was held in Gwanghwamun and welcomed the evictees. Aligned with the protest, two National assembly members proposed the “Protection from Eviction Act”, which aimed to assure the rights of the evictees and to hold government and businesses accountable for the guarantee of means of living and housing for the evictees.

Since 2016, a complex has been constructed on the site of Yongsan Tragedy, and there will no longer be any tangible remnants of Yongsan tragedy.

== See also ==
- Two Doors
