= Jung Sung-il =

Jung Sung-il may refer to:

- Jung Sung-il (figure skater)
- Jung Sung-il (actor)
- Jung Sung-il (director)
