= Sword in the Moon =

- Theatrical poster
- Hangul: 청풍명월
- Hanja: 淸風明月
- RR: Cheongpungmyeongwol
- MR: Ch'ŏngp'ungmyŏngwŏl
- Directed by: Kim Ui-seok
- Written by: Jang Min-seok
- Produced by: Lee Dong-kwon
- Starring: Choi Min-soo; Cho Jae-hyun
- Cinematography: Mun Yong-shik
- Music by: Lee Gyeong-seop
- Distributed by: Sinabro Entertainment
- Release date: 16 July 2003 (South Korea)
- Running time: 103 minutes
- Country: South Korea
- Language: Korean

Sword in the Moon (Korean: 청풍명월; RR: Cheongpungmyeongwol) is a 2003 South Korean action-adventure film directed by Kim Ui-seok, starring Choi Min-soo and Cho Jae-hyun. It screened in the Un Certain Regard section at the 2004 Cannes Film Festival.

== Plot ==
The film opens up with an assassination attempt on the king of Joseon at some sort of reception. The attempt is foiled by a special security squad, and specifically by its leader, Gyu-yup. A series of deaths of prominent politicians leads to a nighttime battle in which one member, a female, of what is apparently an assassin duo, is captured. Gyu-yup recognizes this female, and after her torture in prison (of which Gyu-yup is left in charge when she refuses to divulge any information), the film flashes back to Gyu-yup's past.

Shortly after the Japanese invasions of Korea in the middle of the Joseon period, a military unit of elite soldiers (made up of students of the Clear Wind Shining Moon sword school) is created to ensure the peace and the security/safety of the country. In its center, the two best swordsmen, Ji-hwan and Gyu-yup, are also two inseparable friends. But a political coup d'etat plot (it is referred to as a "rebellion" in the film) forces Gyu-yup, threatened with the death of his entire unit of elite soldiers, to not only kill his fencing master, but also Ji-hwan, who is seeing the female assassin from the night battle, Shi-young (who was also a warrior at the time, and the daughter of the school's fencing master). Having had to behead his master, kill his best friend and his best friend's lover, and lead his troops against members of their own training school (as one character protests, "we have killed the brothers with whom we shed blood"), we are led to understand that Gyu-yup loses some part of himself.

The film returns to the present, five years after the events in the flashback. Gyu-yup is known as a cold and cruel commander, nicknamed "the human butcher." The discovery of a sword during the night battle that carries the seal of Gyu-yup's old unit (such swords, with the exception of Gyu-yup's, were apparently destroyed and at least not in use by this time, so the only other person who could be wielding one is Ji-hwan) confirms the fact that Ji-hwan is back as well (and not dead as Gyu-yup had thought). The current king (the usurper general who, in Gyu-yup's flashback, is the commander who forces him to choose between the deaths of his men and leading his men against Ji-hwan, Shi-young, and the training master) himself becomes embroiled in what amount to attempts to cover up his tracks and betrays at least one of his foremost commanders by ordering his assassination. The king then plans an excursion aimed at drawing out Ji-hwan and Shi-young (who we are made to understand was allowed to be freed by Ji-hwan in disguise under Gyu-yup's watch) into the open where they are meant to be killed.

The excursion (of which Ji-hwan and Shi-young become aware) takes place, and the king is almost killed by Ji-hwan, but he is momentarily distracted by the death of Shi-young at the hands of the king's elite bodyguard and troops. The king, stabbing Ji-hwan with a heretofore hidden dagger, pushes Ji-hwan away; and the king continues to look on as Ji-hwan battles more troops. Almost defeated, Gyu-yup, finally moved by compassion and his past relationship with Shi-young and Ji-hwan, comes to Ji-hwan's rescue. He pleads for his and Ji-hwan's freedom (Gyu-yup had promised his neck to the current king during the rebellion in order to save his own troops from execution, and the now-king took this to mean this promise was binding in perpetuity), and when that is met with silence, he and Ji-hwan engage the troops that have surrounded them. The movie ends by freezing the old friends, united in battle again, in action against the usurper king's troops.

== Cast ==
- Choi Min-soo as Choi Ji-hwan
- Cho Jae-hyun as Yoon Gyu-yup
- Kim Bo-kyung as Kim Shi-young
- Lee Jong-soo as Jae-duk
- Jeon Sung-hwan as Jung Yeo-kyun
- Cho Sang-keon as Kim In
- Kim Sung-oh as Mu-kwan's underling 3
