= Scarlet Innocence =

- Theatrical release poster
- Directed by: Yim Pil-sung
- Written by: Yim Pil-sung; Jang Yoon-mi
- Produced by: Seo Jong-hae
- Starring: Jung Woo-sung; Esom; Park So-young; Kim Hee-won
- Cinematography: Lee Sung-jae
- Edited by: Kim Sang-bum
- Music by: Mowg
- Production company: Creative Group Animal Planet
- Distributed by: CJ Entertainment
- Release date: October 2, 2014
- Running time: 111 minutes
- Country: South Korea
- Language: Korean
- Box office: US$2.8 million

Scarlet Innocence (Korean: 마담 뺑덕; RR: Madam ppaengdeok) is a 2014 South Korea erotic thriller film co-written and directed by Yim Pil-sung, starring Jung Woo-sung and Esom. It is a modern-day retelling of the classic Korean folktale Simcheongga.

== Plot ==
After getting caught in a sex scandal, literature professor Shim Hak-kyu (Jung Woo-sung) is forced to leave Seoul to teach in a small, rural town, until the matter is settled, leaving his depressed wife (Yoon Se-ah) and daughter, Chung-yi (Park Seo-yeon). Hak-kyu becomes involved in a relationship with Deok-yi (Esom), a naive ticket seller for a soon-to-be-dismantled amusement park. Their relationship quickly spreads to the town residents and greatly disturbs Deok-yi's deaf mother (Kim Nam-jin). Eventually, Hak-kyu's name is cleared with the help of his friend, Dong-woo (Lee Chang-hoon), allowing him to teach at his university. Before he departs, Deok-yi reveals that their previous intimacy had made her pregnant. After aborting the baby, Hak-kyu leaves, promising to return for Deok-yi. Instead, he goes back home and gives respite to his miserable wife.

Though Hak-kyu is still going to the rural town for a while, he avoids Deok-yi, telling her to "wait". One night, Hak-kyu visits her home to bribe her into never speaking of their relationship again for a sum of money. During the conflict, Deok-yi forgets to turn off the stove, which engulfs her house with her mother still inside. Receiving distressing calls from Chung-yi, Hak-kyu returns home to find that his wife has committed suicide.

Eight years later, Hak-kyu has become a successful writer, but is leading a wild lifestyle, including drinking, smoking, and gambling, becoming heavily indebted in the process. At the same time, he learns that an illness is threatening his vision. Chung-yi (Park So-young), meanwhile, is beginning to slip away and go to a club, where she meets Deok-yi, who has taken up the identity of "Yoon Se-jung" and is moving in as the Shim's new neighbor. Deok-yi starts to frequently tend to the Shim as Hak-kyu spirals down due to his debt and his firing from his university, also recommending him an ophthalmologist (Yang Jin-woo), who only makes him blind. Eventually, the gambling boss, Mr. Choi (Kim Hee-won), forces Hak-kyu to sign a contract sending Chung-yi to Japan to work as a prostitute in return for a hefty sum of money. During Hak-kyu's period of mourning, Deok-yi reveals her identity and her anger to him, saying she will continue to make him suffer until he dies. She is also revealed to have learned Hak-kyu's location and condition from Dong-woo in favor of sex with him.

However, Deok-yi is horrified when the now-experienced Chung-yi manages to return home. Chung-yi reveals that she already knows what Deok-yi had done to her family, including recommending the mock ophthalmologist, promising to return her revenge back to her. Through her client, a Japanese man (Shinjo Huta) who controls Mr. Choi's casino, Deok-yi's contract with Mr. Choi is concluded. Chung-yi then forces Deok-yi into a surgery (surgery conducted by the ophthalmologist after he was beaten), to give her eyes to her father. Before the operation, Hak-kyu apologizes to the tearful Deok-yi, telling her that he will make everything right for her and Chung-yi.

The film closes with the now blind Deok-yi sitting near a lake and grabbing her hand was Hak-kyu, who watches her and says "Deok-yi, I love you".

== Cast ==
- Jung Woo-sung as Shim Hak-kyu
- Esom as Deok-yi
- Park Si-woo as Chung-yi
- Kim Hee-won as Casino Mr. Choi
- Kim Nam-jin as Deok-yi's mother
- Lee Chang-hoon as Dong-woo
- Yang Jin-woo as Ophthalmologist
- Shinjo Huta as Japanese chairman
- Park Seo-yeon as young Chung-yi
- Kim Ja-young as Mom-and-pop store owner
- Yoo Soon-woong as Elder in novel writing class 1
- Im Hyeong-tae as Elder in novel writing class 2
- Eo Joo-seon as Elder in novel writing class 3
- Lee Sang-hwa as Middle-aged man in novel writing class
- Han Joo-young as Ji-eun
- Park Pal-young as University president
- Park So-dam as Chung-yi's friend at the club
- Cho Yoon-woo as Handsome guy at the club
- Kim Do-yeon as Innkeeper
- Son Suk-ku as Casino henchman 2
- Yoon Se-ah as Chung-yi's mother (cameo)

== Awards and nominations ==
Year	Award	Category	Recipient	Result
2014	51st Grand Bell Awards	Best New Actress	Esom	Nominated
2014	35th Blue Dragon Film Awards	Best New Actress	Esom	Nominated
2015	51st Baeksang Arts Awards	Best New Actress (Film)	Esom	Nominated
2015	15th Director's Cut Awards	Best New Actress	Esom	Won
2015	24th Buil Film Awards	Best New Actress	Esom	Nominated
