= Inseparable Bros =

2019 film by Yook Sang-hyo

- Theatrical release poster
- Hangul: 나의 특별한 형제
- Hanja: 나의 特別한 兄弟
- RR: Naui teukbyeolhan hyeongje
- MR: Naŭi t'ŭkpyŏrhan hyŏngje
- Directed by: Yook Sang-hyo
- Screenplay by: Yook Sang-hyo
- Produced by: Shim Jae-myung; Ha Jung-wan; Moon Yong-chan
- Starring: Shin Ha-kyun; Lee Kwang-soo; Esom
- Cinematography: Sung Seung-taek
- Edited by: Kim Sang-bum
- Music by: Lee Ji-soo
- Production companies: Myung Films; Joy Rabbit
- Distributed by: Next Entertainment World
- Release date: May 1, 2019
- Running time: 114 minutes
- Country: South Korea
- Language: Korean
- Box office: US$9.4 million

Inseparable Bros is a 2019 South Korean comedy-drama film directed by Yook Sang-hyo, starring Shin Ha-kyun, Lee Kwang-soo and Esom.

== Plot ==
Kang Se-ha (Shin Ha-kyun) and Park Dong-gu (Lee Kwang-soo) are not blood-related brothers, but they have been like brothers for the past 20 years. Se-ha is smart, but he has a physical disability. Dong-gu is not very smart, but he is in excellent physical condition. Mi-hyun (Esom) is the only person who treats them without prejudice, and she helps them get out into the world. One day, Dong-gu's mother suddenly visits him and acts as his guardian.

== Cast ==
=== Main ===
- Shin Ha-kyun as Kang Se-ha
- Lee Kwang-soo as Park Dong-gu
- Esom as Nam Mi-hyun

=== Supporting ===
- Park Chul-min as Song Seok-du, a Social Welfare's worker.
- Kwon Hae-hyo as Park Joo-min, a priest.
- Gil Hae-yeon as Jang Jung-soon, Dong-gu's mother.
- Kim Kyung-nam as Yook Kyung-nam

== Production ==
Principal photography began on May 23, 2018, and wrapped on August 17, 2018.

== Release ==
The film premiered in South Korean cinemas on May 1, 2019, and ranked second in the local box office behind Avengers: Endgame.

== Awards and nominations ==
Awards	Category	Recipient	Result	Ref.
28th Buil Film Awards	Best Supporting Actress	Esom	Nominated	
39th Korean Association of Film Critics Awards	Best Actor	Shin Ha-kyun	Won	
39th Korean Association of Film Critics Awards	Best Screenplay	Yook Sang-hyo	Won	
40th Blue Dragon Film Awards	Best Supporting Actor	Lee Kwang-soo	Nominated	
40th Blue Dragon Film Awards	Popular Star Award	Lee Kwang-soo	Won	
56th Baeksang Arts Awards	Best Supporting Actor - Film	Lee Kwang-soo	Won	
40th Golden Cinema Film Festival	Best Supporting Actor	Lee Kwang-soo	Won	
