= 39th Blue Dragon Film Awards =

2018 edition of award ceremony

- Date: November 23, 2018
- Site: Kyung Hee University's Peace Palace Hall, Seoul
- Hosted by: Kim Hye-soo; Yoo Yeon-seok

Highlights
- Best Film: 1987: When the Day Comes
- Most awards: 1987: When the Day Comes (3)
- Most nominations: 1987: When the Day Comes (10)

Television coverage
- Network: SBS
- Duration: 120 minutes

The 39th Blue Dragon Film Awards (Korean: 제39회 청룡영화상) ceremony was held on November 23, 2018, at Kyung Hee University's Peace Palace Hall in Seoul. It was live broadcast on SBS and hosted by Kim Hye-soo and Yoo Yeon-seok. Organized by Sports Chosun (a sister brand of The Chosun Ilbo), the annual award show honored the best in Korean language films released from October 12, 2017, to October 11, 2018.

== Nominations and winners ==
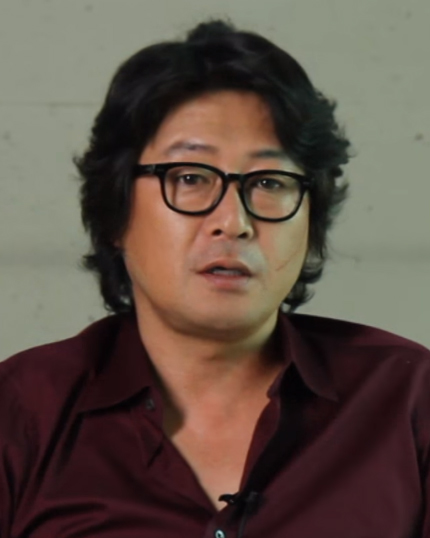
Kim Yoon-seok, Best Actor winner

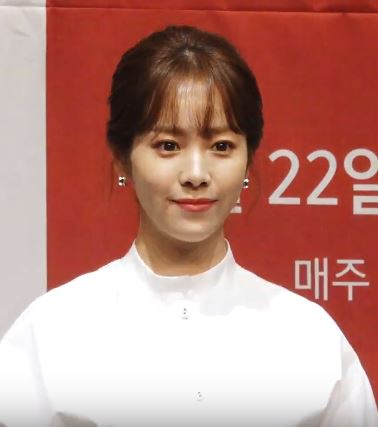
Han Ji-min, Best Actress winner

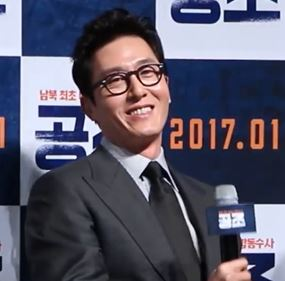
Kim Joo-hyuk, Best Supporting Actor winner

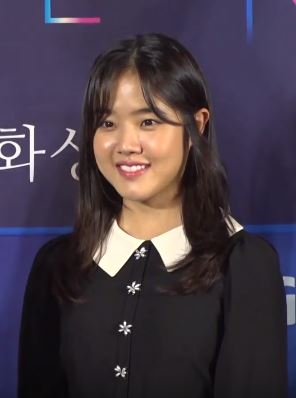
Kim Hyang-gi, Best Supporting Actress winner

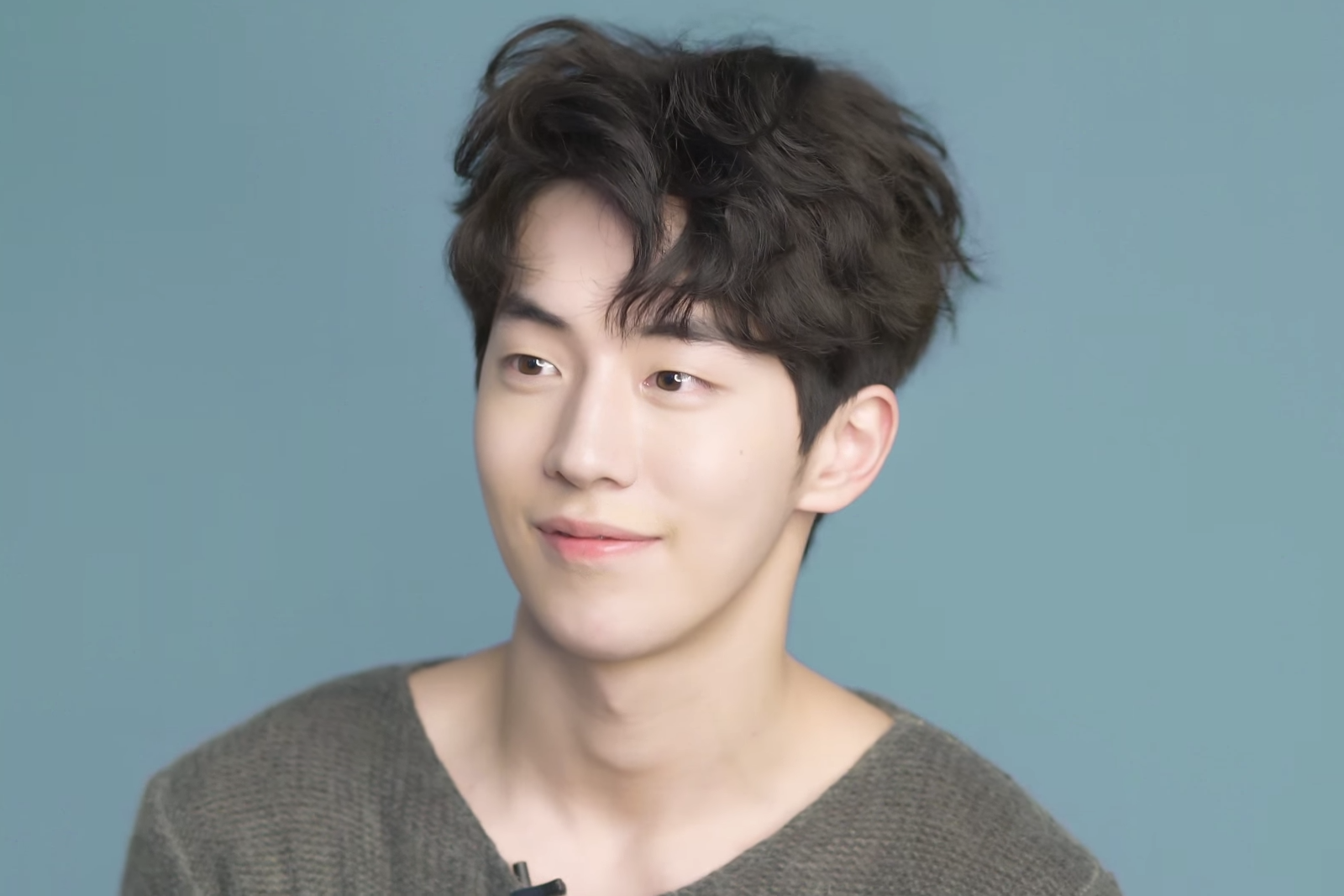
Nam Joo-hyuk, Best New Actor winner

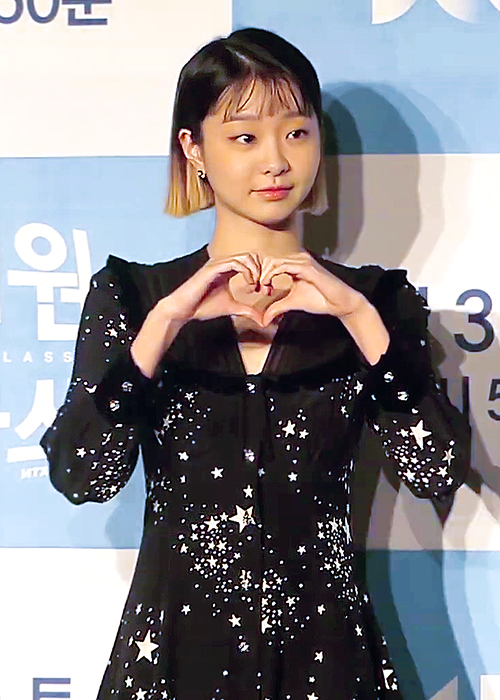
Kim Da-mi, Best New Actress winner

Complete list of nominees and winners

Winners are listed first, highlighted in boldface, and indicated with a double dagger (‡).

=== Main awards ===
| **Best Film** | **Best Director** |
| **1987: When the Day Comes**‡; Along with the Gods: The Two Worlds; Dark Figure of Crime; Little Forest; The Spy Gone North | **Yoon Jong-bin** – **The Spy Gone North**‡; Jang Joon-hwan – 1987: When the Day Comes; Kim Yong-hwa – Along with the Gods: The Two Worlds; Min Kyu-dong – Herstory; Yim Soon-rye – Little Forest |
| **Best Leading Actor** | **Best Leading Actress** |
| **Kim Yoon-seok** – **1987: When the Day Comes**‡; Ha Jung-woo – Along with the Gods: The Two Worlds; Ju Ji-hoon – Dark Figure of Crime; Lee Sung-min – The Spy Gone North; Yoo Ah-in – Burning | **Han Ji-min** – **Miss Baek**‡; Esom – Microhabitat; Kim Hee-ae – Herstory; Kim Tae-ri – Little Forest; Park Bo-young – On Your Wedding Day |
| **Best Supporting Actor** | **Best Supporting Actress** |
| **Kim Joo-hyuk** – **Believer**‡; Ju Ji-hoon – The Spy Gone North; Kim Dong-wook – Along with the Gods: The Two Worlds; Steven Yeun – Burning; Yoo Hae-jin – 1987: When the Day Comes | **Kim Hyang-gi** – **Along with the Gods: The Two Worlds**‡; Jin Seo-yeon – Believer; Kim Sun-young – Herstory; Kwon So-hyun – Miss Baek; Lee Joo-young – Believer |
| **Best New Actor** | **Best New Actress** |
| **Nam Joo-hyuk** – **The Great Battle**‡; Kim Young-kwang – On Your Wedding Day; Lee Ga-sub – The Seeds of Violence; Sung Yu-bin – Last Child; Wi Ha-joon – Gonjiam: Haunted Asylum | **Kim Da-mi** – **The Witch: Part 1. The Subversion**‡; Jeon Jong-seo – Burning; Jeon Yeo-been – After My Death; Kim Ga-hee – Park Hwa-young; Park Ji-hyun – Gonjiam: Haunted Asylum |
| **Best New Director** | **Best Screenplay** |
| **Jeon Go-woon** – **Microhabitat**‡; Kim Eui-seok – After My Death; Kim Tae-gyun – Dark Figure of Crime; Lee Ji-won – Miss Baek; Shin Dong-seok – Last Child | **Kwak Kyung-taek** & **Kim Tae-gyun** – **Dark Figure of Crime**‡; Jeon Go-woon – Microhabitat; Kim Kyung-chan – 1987: When the Day Comes; Kwon Sung-hwi & Yoon Jong-bin – The Spy Gone North; Shin Dong-seok – Last Child |
| **Best Cinematography-Lighting** | **Best Editing** |
| **Kim Woo-hyung** & **Kim Seung-gyu** – **1987: When the Day Comes**‡; Choi Chan-min & Yoo Seok-moon – The Spy Gone North; Kim Byung-seo & Shin Kyung-man – Along with the Gods: The Two Worlds; Lee Mo-gae & Lee Sung-hwan – Illang: The Wolf Brigade; Nam Dong-geun & Jung Hae-ji – The Great Battle | **Kim Hyung-joo** & **Jung Beom-sik** & **Yang Dong-yeop** – **Gonjiam: Haunted Asylum**‡; Kim Jin-oh & Kim Hye-jin – Along with the Gods: The Two Worlds; Kim Sang-bum & Kim Jae-beom – The Spy Gone North; Kim Seon-min – Little Forest; Yang Jin-mo – 1987: When the Day Comes |
| **Best Art Direction** | **Technical Award** |
| **Park Il-hyun** – **The Spy Gone North**‡; Han Ah-reum – 1987: When the Day Comes; Jo Hwa-sung – Illang: The Wolf Brigade; Lee Mok-won – Along with the Gods: The Two Worlds; Yoon Na-ra – Little Forest | **Jin Jong-hyun** (Visual Effects) – **Along with the Gods: The Two Worlds**‡; Chae Kyung-hwa (Costumes Design) – 1987: When the Day Comes; Park Jeong-ryool & Kim Jeong-min (Stunts) – The Witch: Part 1. The Subversion; Park Yong-gi & Park Joo-gang (Sound) – Gonjiam: Haunted Asylum; Yoon Dae-won (Special Effects) – The Great Battle |
**Best Music**
**Dalpalan** – **Believer**‡; Bang Joon-seok – Sunset in My Hometown; Jo Yeong-wook – The Spy Gone North; Kim Tae-seong – 1987: When the Day Comes; Mowg – Burning

=== Other awards ===
- Best Short Film:
  - **A New Record** (Director Heo Ji-eun & Lee Kyung-ho)‡
- Audience Choice Award for Most Popular Film:
  - **1st** – **Along with the Gods: The Two Worlds**‡
    - 2nd – Along with the Gods: The Last 49 Days
    - 3rd – 1987: When the Day Comes
    - 4th – The Great Battle
    - 5th – Believer
- Popular Star Award:
  - **Ju Ji-hoon** – **The Spy Gone North**‡
  - **Kim Young-kwang** – **On Your Wedding Day**‡
  - **Kim Hyang-gi** – **Along with the Gods: The Two Worlds**‡
  - **Jin Seo-yeon** – **Believer**‡

== Films with multiple wins ==
The following films received multiple wins:

| Wins | Films |
|---|---|
| 3 | 1987: When the Day Comes |
| 2 | Along with the Gods: The Two Worlds |
| 2 | The Spy Gone North |

== Films with multiple nominations ==
The following films received multiple nominations:

| Nominations | Films |
|---|---|
| 10 | 1987: When the Day Comes |
| 9 | Along with the Gods: The Two Worlds |
| 9 | The Spy Gone North |
| 5 | Little Forest |
| 4 | Burning |
| 4 | Gonjiam: Haunted Asylum |
| 4 | Dark Figure of Crime |
| 4 | Believer |
| 3 | Miss Baek |
| 3 | Last Child |
| 3 | Microhabitat |
| 3 | Herstory |
| 3 | The Great Battle |
| 2 | On Your Wedding Day |
| 2 | After My Death |
| 2 | Illang: The Wolf Brigade |
| 2 | The Witch: Part 1. The Subversion |

== Presenters ==
| Order | Presenter | Award |
|---|---|---|
| 1 | Do Kyung-soo, Kim So-hyun | Best New Actor |
| 2 | Lee Jun-ho, Choi Hee-seo | Best New Actress |
| 3 | Park Eun-kyung, Lee Jeong-eun | Audience Choice Award for Most Popular Film |
| 4 | Jo Woo-jin, Park Bo-young | Best New Director |
| 5 | Kim In-kwon, Kang Han-na | Technical Award; Best Cinematography-Lighting; Best Editing |
| 6 | Bae Jong-ok | Best Music; Best Art Direction; Best Screenplay |
| 7 | Son Hyun-joo, Jin Seon-gyu | Best Supporting Actor |
| 8 | Lee Seo-jin, Kim So-jin | Best Supporting Actress |
| 9 | Ku Hye-sun | Best Short Film |
| 10 | Park Joong-hoon | Best Director |
| 11 | Song Kang-ho, Jo Yeo-jeong | Best Actor |
| 12 | Daesang's CEO Im Jeong-bae, Seo Young-hee | Best Actress |
| 13 | Sports Chosun's representative director Lee Sung-gwan | Best Film |

== Special performances ==
| Artist | Performance | References |
|---|---|---|
| Twice | Yes or Yes | |
