= Dark Figure of Crime (film) =

South Korean film

- Theatrical release poster
- Hangul: 암수살인
- Hanja: 暗數殺人
- Lit.: Unknown Murders
- RR: Amsusarin
- MR: Amsusarin
- Directed by: Kim Tae-kyun
- Written by: Kwak Kyung-taek; Kim Tae-kyun
- Produced by: Shin Young-il
- Starring: Kim Yoon-seok; Ju Ji-hoon
- Cinematography: Hwang Ki-suk
- Edited by: Kim Sun-min
- Music by: Mok Young-jin
- Production companies: 295 Films; Blossom Pictures
- Distributed by: Showbox
- Release date: October 3, 2018
- Running time: 110 minutes
- Country: South Korea
- Language: Korean
- Budget: ₩8 billion
- Box office: US$29.5 million

Dark Figure of Crime (Korean: 암수살인; RR: Amsusarin; lit. Unknown Murders) is a 2018 South Korean crime drama film directed by Kim Tae-kyun. It stars Kim Yoon-seok and Ju Ji-hoon. It was released on October 3, 2018. The film was loosely inspired by the 869th episode of Unanswered, a South Korean investigation television program, which tells a real story that happened in Busan, where murders were never reported, bodies were never found, and investigations never happened.

== Plot ==
Kim is a widowed narcotics officer who meets with a potential informant named Kang. As they are talking at a restaurant, Kang is arrested by the homicide division for killing his girlfriend. He confesses to the murder and is put behind bars.

A few months later, Kang contacts Kim from prison and claims that he has murdered six other people. However, he refuses to talk to the homicide detectives who he claims fabricated evidence against him to have him imprisoned. Kim agrees to find the real evidence in exchange for information on the remaining six bodies. Kim uncovers the actual evidence with Kang's information, proving the homicide detectives fabricated his case. As a result, the detectives are charged and Kang's sentence is reduced. In return, Kang provides information on the six remaining victims as promised.

Of the six remaining victims, Kim first investigates the disappearance of Oh Ji Hee, a former swimmer who is forced to work at a nightclub to support her grandmother in the village. Kang claims he killed her one night after driving her away from the city while working there as a cab driver. Throughout his investigation, Kim is repeatedly told by people he questions about Kang that he is not to be trusted. Still, Kim perseveres. With much difficulty, Kang finds part of Oh's remains. However, when he is interrogated by Kim, Kang lies on record about Kim coercing him to make false statements and bribing him to do so. Furthermore, DNA results show that the remains are not Oh's. The prosecutor cannot indict Kang as the evidence against him is not convincing enough.

Kim feels cheated and goes to his former mentor, Song for advice. Song advises Kim to stop pursuing Kang's case since the murderer is trying to make himself appear innocent in other crimes to overturn the sentencing for the crime he is serving time for at present. Kim also visits Kang's older sister, who reveals Kang killed their father when he was just a boy. She helped him cover up the murder. As a result, Kang grew up to become a serial killer who became responsible for many other deaths. Kim cannot bring this case to court since the statute of limitations has ended.

With the help of his new partner, Jo, Kim start investigating a second victim, Hwang, whom Kang claims he killed by pushing down a flight of stairs. Kim and Jo look into old files of unsolved cases and find one matching Hwang's murder. The case is brought to trial but since there is only circumstantial evidence, Kang is not convicted of the murder. As a result, Kim is demoted and Jo is transferred to the narcotics division.

While clearing his desk, Kim notices an IUD birth control implant in the crime scene photo of the unidentified remains. He then gets a list of all the women who had IUD implants around the time of the murder and discovers one reported missing woman, Park Mi Yong. Kim quickly learns that Park was Kang's girlfriend at the time. She came to the city with her young son. As he grew older, Park realized that her constant fighting with Kang was not healthy for her son. She tries to break up with Kang and this is when he kills her. Kim tracks down Park's son, who is a teenager now, and has him testify in court against Kang. Kang is finally sentenced to life imprisonment.

== Cast ==
=== Main ===
- Kim Yoon-seok as Kim Hyung-min
- Ju Ji-hoon as Kang Tae-oh

=== Supporting ===
- Jin Seon-kyu as Detective Jo
- Heo Jin as Ji-hee's grandmother
- Kwon So-hyun as Oh Ji-hee
- Kim Jong-soo as Capt. Ma-soo
- Lee Bong-ryun as Kang Sook-ja
- Bae Hae-sun as Park Mi-young
- Jung Jong-joon as Detective Chief
- Kim Joong-ki as Lawyer
- Shim So-young as Auntie
- Kim Young-woong as Jung-bong
- Jung Ki-sub as Detective Han
- Jeon Gook-hwan as Hyung-min's father
- Won Hyun-joon as Kim Ok-chul

=== Special appearance ===
- Moon Jeong-hee as Kim Soo-min
- Ko Chang-seok as Capt. Jam-soo

== Production ==
After watching the episode of Unanswered, Kim Tae-kyun began to work on his script and finished it after five years. During that time, he frequently interviewed the detective who worked on the case for his script material. Principal photography began on August 14, 2017, in Busan, and finished November 6, 2017.

== Release ==
The film was released in South Korea on October 3, 2018, alongside Hollywood films Venom, Christopher Robin and Sherlock Gnomes. On November 5, 2018, it was released in VOD services.

On August 20, 2018, the film received a R-rating from the Korea Media Rating Board, where the film is intended for audiences aged 19 and over. Replying to media, the film's production company stated that the film did not contained 'such strong' restricted content (such as violence and gore), and they believed that it is milder than two other 2018 released films Believer and The Witch: Part 1. The Subversion, which both received age 15 rating. As such, the film was re-edited and re-submitted to the board for an "age 15 rating", with no change in its release schedule. The film eventually was released under an "age 15 rating", after approximately 2 minutes' worth of content were shaved off from the original cut.

The film was selected as the opening film of the 3rd London East Asia Film Festival, held from October 25 to November 4, 2018.

== Reception ==
=== Critical response ===
The film received positive reviews. Praise was given to Kim's directing, the acting performances, and the intriguing plot.

Yoon Min-sik from The Korea Herald praised the film and wrote, "It is a rare film with strong directing and acting that tells a compelling story with heart, mixed with suspense. The mystery tantalizingly teases viewers as they are sucked into the plot. Ju's portrayal of a psychopathic killer was surprisingly convincing and on-point. While his co-star Kim is as brilliant as expected."

Park Bo-ram from Yonhap News Agency also gave praise to the film, "The fierce interplay between the two main characters, portrayed by two rounded actors arguably both in the prime of their acting careers, forms the film's core, setting it apart from other crime films that play with cathartic action scenes or steel-strong images of police detectives."

=== Box office ===
The film finished in second place during its opening day, grossing US$3.4 million from 438,941 attendance, tailing Venom in the lead. It is second-biggest opening day for South Korean film this year after Along with the Gods: The Last 49 Days. On October 6, four days after its release, the film surpassed 1 million admissions. During its opening weekend, the film earned US$7.9 million gross from 995,752 attendance and finished in second place, tailing Venom in the chart lead.

On October 9, the film surpassed its break-even point at 2 million admissions. During its second weekend, the film rose to top the box office with US$4.4 million gross from 552,983 attendance, though having 44% lower gross than its debut weekend.

The film surpassed 3 million admissions on October 17, after topping the box office for seven consecutive days. During its third weekend, the film dropped to second place with US$2.5 million gross from 311,620 attendance. The film grossed US$1.3 million from 161,156 attendance during its fourth weekend and finished second.

As of November 7, 2018, the film earned US$29.5 million gross from 3,783,099 total attendance.

== Controversy ==
On September 20, 2018, the sister of a victim filed an injunction to the Seoul Central District Court to ban the screening of the film, complaining that the production crew did not ask permission before making a movie based on the murder of her brother. The family were also upset that the film only changed the story's timeline to 2012 (the actual murder case happened in 2007), and that some elements in the film bear great similarity to the actual case, such the suspect's age and his murder method.

In response to the controversy, the production crew released an official apology statement to the family on September 21, 2018, indicating they had been inconsiderate to the family and they will correspond with the family immediately.

On September 27, 2018, the family member of another victim shared a post on his social media account and drew media's attention. The family member had appeared in the 869th episode of Unanswered in 2012, where the program investigated the murder of his mother and other victims. He wrote the reasons why he appeared in that particular program, and also showed support for the release of Dark Figure of Crime, reasoning that the film will bring attention to unreported crimes.

On September 28, 2018, the Seoul Central District Court held the first hearing between the production company and the victim's family to decide if the film will be banned from release. The court watched the film for about 50 minutes, focusing on the issues raised by the victims' families where they claimed the film had reenacted almost 99% of the actual crime methods, the locations, time, and the victims' wounds. The court announced their decision by October 1, 2018.

On October 1, 2018, the families of the victims withdrew their application for the screening ban, after receiving a sincere apology from the production company and also having considered the film's intention to increase the awareness of unreported crimes.

== Awards and nominations ==
Awards	Category	Recipient	Result	Ref.
38th Korean Association of Film Critics Awards	Top 11 Films	Dark Figure of Crime	Won	
38th Korean Association of Film Critics Awards	Best Screenplay	Kwak Kyung-taek & Kim Tae-kyun	Won	
3rd London East Asia Film Festival	Best Actor	Kim Yoon-seok	Won	
39th Blue Dragon Film Awards	Best Film	Dark Figure of Crime	Nominated	
39th Blue Dragon Film Awards	Best Leading Actor	Ju Ji-hoon	Nominated	
39th Blue Dragon Film Awards	Best Screenplay	Kwak Kyung-taek & Kim Tae-kyun	Won	
39th Blue Dragon Film Awards	Best New Director	Kim Tae-kyun	Nominated	
5th Korean Film Producers Association Awards	Best Actor	Ju Ji-hoon	Won	
55th Baeksang Arts Awards	Best Film	Dark Figure of Crime	Nominated	
55th Baeksang Arts Awards	Best Actor	Ju Ji-hoon	Nominated	
55th Baeksang Arts Awards	Best Screenplay	Kwak Kyung-taek & Kim Tae-kyun	Won	
24th Chunsa Film Art Awards	Best Actor	Ju Ji-hoon	Won	
24th Chunsa Film Art Awards	Best New Director	Kim Tae-gyun	Won	
28th Buil Film Awards	Best Film	Dark Figure of Crime	Nominated	
28th Buil Film Awards	Best Director	Kim Tae-kyun	Won	
28th Buil Film Awards	Best Actor	Ju Ji-hoon	Nominated	
28th Buil Film Awards	Best Screenplay	Kwak Kyung-taek & Kim Tae-kyun	Nominated	
28th Buil Film Awards	Best Cinematography	Hwang Gi-seok	Nominated	
