= Esom =

South Korean actress (born 1990)

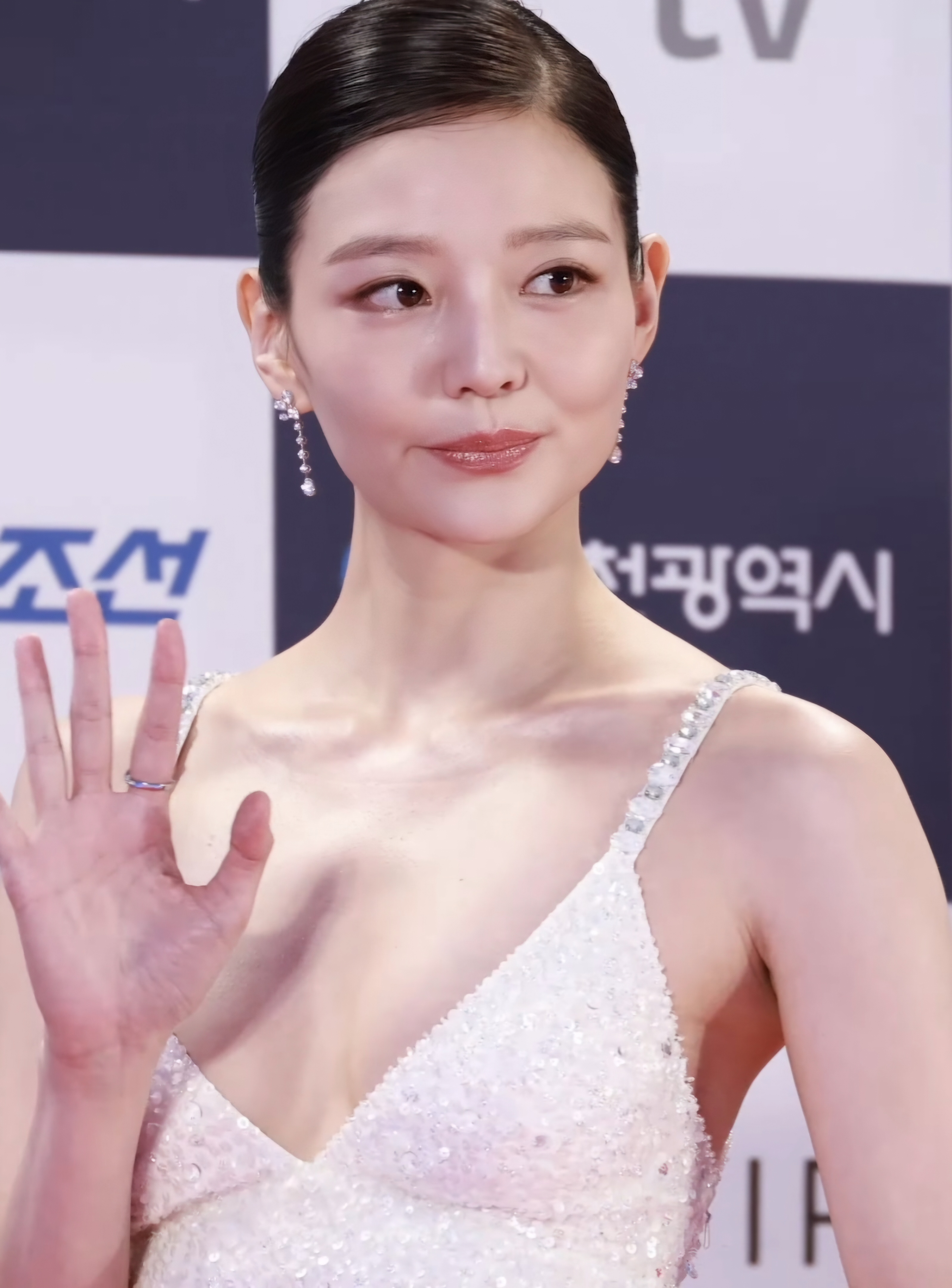
- Esom in July 2024
- Born: Lee So-young; January 30, 1990 (age 36); Seoul, South Korea
- Other name: Lee Som
- Occupations: Actress; model
- Years active: 2008–present
- Agent: Management MMM

Korean name
- Hangul: 이소영
- RR: I Soyeong
- MR: I Soyŏng

Stage name
- Hangul: 이솜
- RR: I Som
- MR: I Som

Lee So-young (Korean: 이소영; January 30, 1990), known by her stage name Esom (이솜), is a South Korean actress.

== Career ==
She gained recognition for her leading role in the 2014 film Scarlet Innocence, for which she was nominated for Best New Actress in five different award ceremonies. She then had notable roles in television series The Third Charm (2018), Taxi Driver (2021), and film Samjin Company English Class (2020).

In January 2023, Esom signed with new agency Management MMM.

== Filmography ==
=== Film ===
| Year | Title | Role | Notes | Ref. |
|---|---|---|---|---|
| 2010 | Second Half | Min-ah | | |
| 2011 | The Last Blossom | Jae-young | | |
| 2011 | Hindsight | Lee Eun-jung | | |
| 2013 | Behind the Camera | | | |
| 2013 | The Gifted Hands | Seung-gi | | |
| 2013 | The X | Fingers | Short film | |
| 2014 | Man on High Heels | Jang-mi | | |
| 2014 | Santa Barbara | So-young | | |
| 2014 | Scarlet Innocence | Deok-yi / Yoon Se-jung | | |
| 2016 | Like for Likes | Jang Na-yeon | | |
| 2016 | The Queen of Crime | Kyung Jin-sook (#402) | Cameo | |
| 2017 | Warriors of the Dawn | Duk-yi | | |
| 2017 | My Little Brother | Oh Joo-mi | | |
| 2018 | Microhabitat | Mi-so | | |
| 2019 | Inseparable Bros | Nam Mi-hyun | | |
| 2020 | Samjin Company English Class | Jung Yoo-na | | |
| 2023 | Phantom | Nan-yeong | | |
| 2023 | Kill Boksoon | Cha Min-hee | Netflix Film | |
| 2023 | Dr. Cheon and Lost Talisman | Yoo-kyung | | |
| 2023 | Single in Seoul | Agatha Hong | | |
| 2024 | Escape | Nomad Leader | Cameo | |
| 2026 | The Ultimate Duo | Mi-joo | | |
| TBA | Starlight Falls | Lee Hyeon-jeong (A) | | |

=== Television series ===
| Year | Title | Role | Notes | Ref. |
|---|---|---|---|---|
| 2011 | White Christmas | Yoon Eun-sung | | |
| 2012 | Phantom | Shin Hyo-jung | Cameo (ep. 1) | |
| 2017 | Because This Is My First Life | Woo Su-ji | | |
| 2018 | The Third Charm | Lee Young-jae | | |
| 2019 | Save Me 2 | Kim Young-seon | | |
| 2021 | Taxi Driver | Kang Ha-na | Season 1 | |
| 2026 | Phantom Lawyer | Han Na-hyeon | | |

=== Web series ===
| Year | Title | Role | Ref. |
|---|---|---|---|
| 2023 | Black Knight | Major Seol-ah | |
| 2024 | LTNS | Woo-jin | |

=== Television shows ===
| Year | Title | Role | Ref. |
|---|---|---|---|
| 2008 | Check It Girl - Season 1 | Participant | |
| 2010 | Trend Report Feel - Season 5 | Participant | |
| 2013 | British Memories | Participant | |

=== Music video appearances ===
| Year | Song title | Artist | Ref. |
|---|---|---|---|
| 2008 | "Wrong Number" | TVXQ | |
| 2009 | "Eternal Summer" | Lee Min-ki | |
| 2010 | "She's Gone" | G-Dragon | |
| 2011 | "Cleansing Cream" | Brown Eyed Girls | |
| 2013 | "Day 'n Night" | Tasty | |

=== Hosting ===
| Year | Title | Notes | Ref. |
|---|---|---|---|
| 2023 | 32nd Buil Film Awards | with Lee Je-hoon | |

== Awards and nominations ==
Name of the award ceremony, year presented, category, nominee of the award, and the result of the nomination
| Award ceremony | Year | Category | Nominee / Work | Result | Ref. |
|---|---|---|---|---|---|
| Baeksang Arts Awards | 2015 | Best New Actress – Film | Scarlet Innocence | Nominated | |
| Baeksang Arts Awards | 2018 | Best Supporting Actress – Film | Warriors of the Dawn | Nominated | |
| Baeksang Arts Awards | 2021 | Best Supporting Actress – Film | Samjin Company English Class | Nominated | |
| Blue Dragon Film Awards | 2014 | Best New Actress | Scarlet Innocence | Nominated | |
| Blue Dragon Film Awards | 2018 | Best Leading Actress | Microhabitat | Nominated | |
| Blue Dragon Film Awards | 2021 | Best Supporting Actress | Samjin Company English Class | Won | |
| Blue Dragon Series Awards | 2024 | Best Actress | LTNS | Nominated | |
| Buil Film Awards | 2015 | Best New Actress | Scarlet Innocence | Nominated | |
| Buil Film Awards | 2018 | Best Actress | Microhabitat | Nominated | |
| Buil Film Awards | 2019 | Best Supporting Actress | Inseparable Bros | Nominated | |
| Buil Film Awards | 2021 | Best Supporting Actress | Samjin Company English Class | Nominated | |
| Buil Film Awards | 2021 | Star of the Year | Samjin Company English Class | Won | |
| Busan Film Critics Awards | 2018 | Best Actress | Microhabitat | Won | |
| Chunsa Film Art Awards | 2019 | Best Actress | Microhabitat | Nominated | |
| Chunsa Film Art Awards | 2021 | Best Supporting Actress | Samjin Company English Class | Nominated | |
| Director's Cut Awards | 2015 | Best New Actress | Scarlet Innocence | Won | |
| Grand Bell Awards | 2014 | Best New Actress | Scarlet Innocence | Nominated | |
| Grand Bell Awards | 2018 | Best Actress | Microhabitat | Nominated | |
| Marie Claire Film Festival | 2018 | Best New Actress | Microhabitat | Won | |
| SBS Drama Awards | 2021 | Excellence Award for an Actress in a Mini-Series Genre/Fantasy Drama | Taxi Driver | Won | |
| Wildflower Film Awards | 2018 | Best Actress | Microhabitat | Won | |
