= Last Child (film) =

2017 film by Shin Dong-seok

- Film poster
- Hangul: 살아남은 아이
- RR: Saranameun ai
- MR: Saranamŭn ai
- Directed by: Shin Dong-seok
- Written by: Shin Dong-seok
- Produced by: Je Jeong-joo
- Starring: Choi Moo-sung; Kim Yeo-jin; Sung Yoo-bin
- Cinematography: Lee Ji-hoon
- Edited by: Lee Young-rim
- Music by: Kim Hae-won
- Production company: ATO
- Distributed by: CGV Arthouse; Atnine Film
- Release dates: October 12, 2017 (BIFF); August 30, 2018 (South Korea)
- Running time: 123 minutes
- Country: South Korea
- Language: Korean

Last Child (Korean: 살아남은 아이; RR: Saranameun ai) is a 2017 South Korean mystery drama film written and directed by Shin Dong-seok in his directorial debut. It stars Choi Moo-sung, Kim Yeo-jin, and Sung Yoo-bin. The film received positive reviews from critics, who praised Shin's direction and the cast's performances (particularly of Sung).

== Plot ==
Six months ago, Jin Sang-chul (Choi Moo-sung) and Lee Mi-sook (Kim Yeo-jin) lost their son Eun-chan who drowned while saving one of his friends, Yoon Gi-hyun (Sung Yu-bin). One day Sang-chul meets Gi-hyun.

== Cast ==
- Choi Moo-sung as Jin Sung-chul
- Kim Yeo-jin as Lee Mi-sook
- Sung Yoo-bin as Yoon Ki-hyun
- Kim Kyung-ik as Oh Hyun-kyu
- Moon Young-dong as Paperhanging team leader
- Lee Hwa-ryong as Homeroom teacher
- Park Chan as Choi Joon-young
- Kim Do-young as Joon-young's mother
- Ryu Ui-hyun as Oh Jung-suk
- Jung Hee-joong as Han-suk
- Kim Sang-woo as Ji-hong
- Lee Min-jae as Sung-woo
- Jung Tae-sung as Ho-sung
- Gong Sang-ah as Ji-sook
- Sung Yul-suk as Civil servant
- Kim Choo-wol as Principal
- Kim Kwang-sik as CEO Sung
- Song Sook-hee as CEO Sung's wife
- Park Sung-yeon as Hyun-kyu's wife
- Eom Ok-ran as CEO Kim's wife
- Choi Yo-han as Ho-sung's father
- Yoon Boo-jin as Ji-hong's mother
- Lee Seung-hun as Ji-hong's father
- Kim Jae-man as Sung-woo's father
- Kim Ki-song as Detective Kim
- Jang Joon-hwi as Detective Choi
- Hong Sang-pyo as Detective Jung
- Jeon Suk-chan as District police officer
- Kim Joon-bum as Obstetrician
- Lee David as Jin Eun-chan (cameo)

== Awards and nominations ==
Year	Award	Category	Recipient	Result	Ref
2017	Seoul Independent Film Festival	Best Feature Prize	Last Child	Won	
2017	22nd Busan International Film Festival	FIPRESCI Award	Last Child	Won	
2018	39th Blue Dragon Film Awards	Best New Actor	Sung Yu-bin	Nominated	
2018	39th Blue Dragon Film Awards	Best New Director	Shin Dong-seok	Nominated	
2018	39th Blue Dragon Film Awards	Best Screenplay	Shin Dong-seok	Nominated	
2018	19th Busan Film Critics Awards	Best New Actor	Sung Yu-bin	Won	
2018	19th Busan Film Critics Awards	Best Screenplay	Shin Dong-seok	Won	
2018	Women in Film Korea Festival	Best Producer		Won	
2018	6th Muju Film Festival	Muju Audience Award	Last Child	Won	
2018	20th Udine Far East Film Festival	White Mulberry Award	Last Child	Won	
2019	Korea Gold Awards Festival	Best New Actor	Sung Yu-bin	Won	
2019	6th Wildflower Film Awards	Best Director (Narrative Films)	Shin Dong-seok	Nominated	
2019	6th Wildflower Film Awards	Best Actor	Sung Yu-bin	Won	
2019	6th Wildflower Film Awards	Best Actor	Choi Moo-sung	Nominated	
2019	6th Wildflower Film Awards	Best Screenplay	Shin Dong-seok	Won	
2019	6th Wildflower Film Awards	Best New Director (Narrative Films)	Shin Dong-seok	Nominated	
2019	6th Wildflower Film Awards	Best New Actor	Sung Yu-bin	Nominated	
2019	55th Baeksang Arts Awards	Best New Director	Shin Dong-seok	Nominated	
2019	28th Buil Film Awards	Best New Actor	Sung Yu-bin	Won	
2019	28th Buil Film Awards	Best Supporting Actor	Choi Moo-sung	Nominated	
2019	28th Buil Film Awards	Best New Director	Shin Dong-seok	Nominated	
2019	28th Buil Film Awards	Best Screenplay	Shin Dong-seok	Nominated	
