= Sung Yoo-bin =

South Korean actor

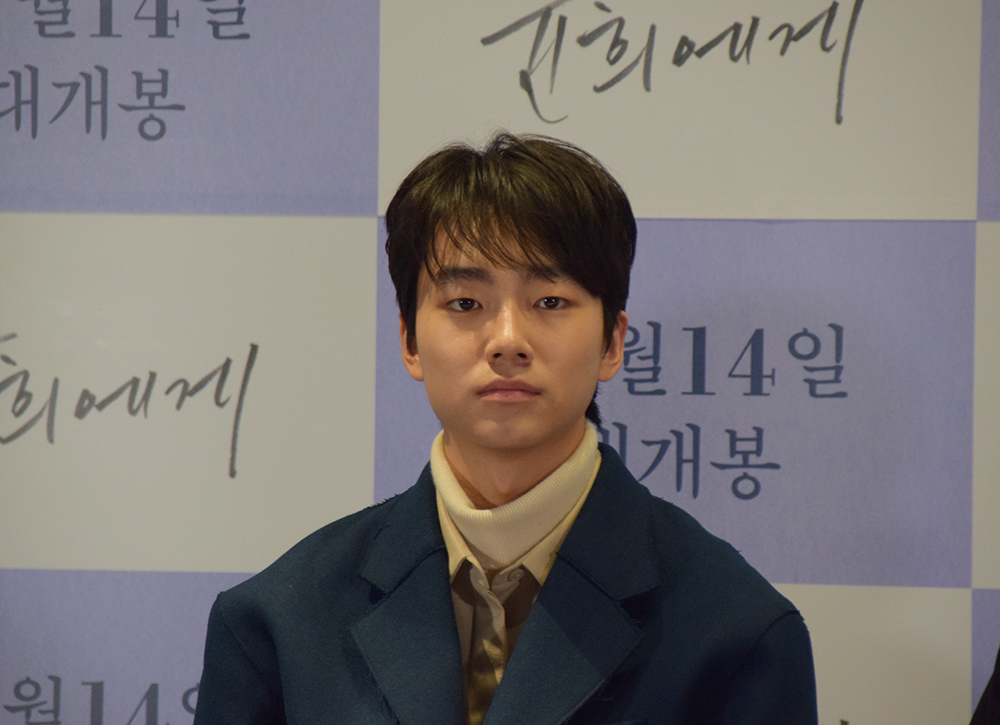
- Sung in 2019
- Born: 25 July 2000 (age 26); Seoul, South Korea
- Education: Chung-Ang University
- Occupation: Actor
- Years active: 2011–present
- Agent(s): P&Studio

Korean name
- Hangul: 성유빈
- RR: Seong Yubin
- MR: Sŏng Yubin

Sung Yoo-bin (born 25 July 2000) is a South Korean actor.

== Filmography ==
=== Film ===
| Year | Title | Role |
|---|---|---|
| 2011 | Bean Sprouts | Soo-wan |
| 2011 | Blind | Dong-hyun (young) |
| 2011 | Black Dove | |
| 2011 | Punch | Do Wan-deuk (young) |
| 2011 | My Way | Tatsuo Hasegawa (young) |
| 2013 | My Paparotti | Jang-ho (young) |
| 2013 | Secretly, Greatly | Rhee Hae-jin (young) |
| 2013 | Hide and Seek | Sung-chul (child) |
| 2014 | The Fatal Encounter | Sang-chaek (young) |
| 2014 | Manhole | Feral boy |
| 2014 | My Dictator | Tae-sik (Middle school student) |
| 2015 | Empire of Lust | Kim Min-jae (young) |
| 2015 | The Trip Around the World | Han Sang-pil |
| 2015 | Memories of the Sword | Gam-cho |
| 2015 | The Tiger: An Old Hunter's Tale | Suk-yi |
| 2016 | Sweet Sixteen | |
| 2017 | I Can Speak | Young-jae |
| 2017 | Along with the Gods: The Two Worlds | Kim Ja-hong (young) |
| 2018 | Last Child | Yoon Gi-hyun |
| 2019 | Birthday | Seong-joon |
| 2019 | The Battle: Roar to Victory | Gae-ddong-yi |
| 2019 | Moonlit Winter | Kyung-soo |
| 2021 | Perhaps Love | Seong-kyeong |
| 2022 | I Want to Know Your Parents | Kang Kang-gyeol |
| 2022 | The Witch : Part 2. The Other One | Dae-gil |
| 2022 | Broker | Young-min |
| 2023 | Count | Yoon-woo |

=== Television series ===
| Year | Title | Role | Notes | Ref. |
|---|---|---|---|---|
| 2013 | Heartless City | | | |
| 2013 | Fantasy Tower | Si-jang | | |
| 2013 | Drama Festival: "Haneuljae's Murder" | Yoon-ha (young) | | |
| 2014 | Drama Festival: "4teen" | Joon-yi | | |
| 2014 | It's Okay, That's Love | Jang Jae-yeol (young) | | |
| 2016 | The Good Wife | Lee Ji-hoon | | |
| 2017 | Black Knight: The Man Who Guards Me | Moon Soo-ho / Lee Myung-so (young) | | |
| 2018 | Mr. Sunshine | Jang Seung-goo (young) | | |
| 2021 | KBS Drama Special: "Between" | Kim Yoon-yi / Kim Hwan-yi | One act-drama | |
| 2022 | O'PENing: "The Underworld Rider" | Kang Min-seok | One act-drama | |
| 2024 | No Way Out: The Roulette | Seo Dong-ha | | |
| 2025 | Resident Playbook | Hong Gi-dong | Cameo (Ep. 7) | |
| 2025 | Twelve | Jwidol | | |

=== Web series ===
| Year | Title | Role | Ref. |
|---|---|---|---|
| TBA | Pleasant Bullying | Dong-hyun | |

== Awards and nominations ==
| Year | Award | Category | Nominated work | Result |
|---|---|---|---|---|
| 2018 | 39th Blue Dragon Film Awards | Best New Actor | Last Child | Nominated |
| 2018 | 19th Busan Film Critics Awards | Best New Actor | Last Child | Won |
| 2018 | 2018 KBS Drama Awards | Best Young Actor | Black Knight: The Man Who Guards Me | Nominated |
| 2019 | Korea Gold Awards Festival | Best New Actor | Last Child | Won |
| 2019 | 6th Wildflower Film Awards | Best Actor | Last Child | Won |
| 2019 | 28th Buil Film Awards | Best New Actor | Last Child | Won |
| 2021 | KBS Drama Awards | Best Actor in Drama Special/TV Cinema | Drama Special – Be;twin | Nominated |
| 2022 | 58th Baeksang Arts Awards | Best Supporting Actor – Film | Perhaps Love | Nominated |
