= After My Death =

- Hangul: 죄 많은 소녀
- RR: Joe maneun sonyeo
- MR: Choe manŭn sonyŏ
- Directed by: Kim Ui-seok
- Screenplay by: Kim Ui-seok
- Starring: Jeon Yeo-been; Seo Young-hwa; Go Won-hee
- Cinematography: Baek Sung-bin
- Edited by: Kim Ui-seok
- Music by: Sunwoo Jung-a
- Release dates: October 2017 (Busan); September 13, 2018 (South Korea)
- Running time: 113 minutes
- Country: South Korea
- Language: Korean

After My Death (Korean: 죄 많은 소녀) is a 2017 South Korean mystery drama film written, directed and edited by Kim Ui-seok and stars Jeon Yeo-been, Seo Young-hwa and Go Won-hee.

== Plot ==
When her missing classmate and close friend Kyung-min (Jeon So-nee) is suspected of committing suicide, Young-hee (Jeon Yeo-been) becomes the prime suspect because she was the last one seen with Kyung-min on the night of her disappearance. Young-hee faces accusations from Kyung-min's mother (Seo Young-hwa) as well as her quick-to-condemn classmates. She insists on her innocence and tries to find out the truth on her own. When the school and her family offer her no support with the bullying she is experiencing, she decides to commit suicide herself.

== Cast ==
- Jeon Yeo-been as Young-hee
- Seo Young-hwa as Kyung-min's mother
- Go Won-hee as Han-sol
- Jeon So-nee as Kyung-min
- Lee Bom as Da-som

== Awards and nominations ==
Year	Award	Category	Recipient	Result	Ref
2017	Seoul Independent Film Festival	Independent Star Award	Jeon Yeo-been	Won	
2017	22nd Busan International Film Festival	New Currents Award	Kim Ui-seok	Won	
2017	22nd Busan International Film Festival	Actress of the Year Award	Jeon Yeo-been	Won	
2018	University Film Festival of Korea	Best Film	After My Death	Won	
2018	Fribourg International Film Festival	Best Feature Films - Special Jury Prize	After My Death	Won	
2018	Muju Film Festival	New Vision Award	Kim Ui-seok	Won	
2018	39th Blue Dragon Film Awards	Best New Actress	Jeon Yeo-been	Nominated	
2018	39th Blue Dragon Film Awards	Best New Director	Kim Ui-seok	Nominated	
2018	19th Busan Film Critics Awards	Best New Actress	Jeon Yeo-been	Won	
2018	18th Director's Cut Awards	Best Vision Award	Kim Ui-seok	Won	
2019	6th Wildflower Film Awards	Best Director (Narrative Films)	Kim Ui-seok	Nominated	
2019	6th Wildflower Film Awards	Best Actress	Jeon Yeo-been	Nominated	
2019	6th Wildflower Film Awards	Best Screenplay	Kim Ui-seok	Nominated	
2019	6th Wildflower Film Awards	Best Cinematography	Baek Sung-bin	Nominated	
2019	6th Wildflower Film Awards	Best Music	Sunwoo Jung-a	Nominated	
2019	6th Wildflower Film Awards	Best New Director (Narrative Films)	Kim Ui-seok	Won	
2019	55th Baeksang Arts Awards	Best New Director	Kim Ui-seok	Nominated	
2019	55th Baeksang Arts Awards	Best New Actress	Jeon Yeo-been	Nominated	
2019	28th Buil Film Awards	Best New Actress	Jeon Yeo-been	Won	
2019	28th Buil Film Awards	Best New Director	Kim Ui-seok	Won	
2019	Chunsa Film Art Awards	Best New Actress	Jeon Yeo-been	Won	
2020	56th Grand Bell Awards	Best New Director	Kim Ui-seok	Nominated	
2020	56th Grand Bell Awards	Best New Actress	Jeon Yeo-been	Won	
