= Jung Sung-il (director) =

South Korean film critic, director and screenwriter

- Born: July 4, 1959 (age 67); Seoul, South Korea
- Education: Sungkyunkwan University
- Occupations: Film critic; film director; screenwriter

Korean name
- Hangul: 정성일
- Hanja: 鄭聖一
- RR: Jeong Seongil
- MR: Chŏng Sŏngil

Jung Sung-il (born July 4, 1959) is a South Korean film critic, director and screenwriter. A well regarded film critic-turned-director, Jung debuted with the romance melodrama film Cafe Noir (2009). His next two works document two well-known directors: Night and Fog in Zona (2015) on Chinese documentary filmmaker Wang Bing, and Cloud, Encore (2018) on Korean filmmaker Im Kwon-taek.

== Career ==
One of the most well-known film critics in Korea, Jung has worked as the chief editor for film magazines Road Show and Kino, a programmer and jury in many festivals, a former adjunct professor of Korea National University of Arts' School of Film, TV and Multimedia, and a guest professor at Korean Academy of Film Arts. He has also written books about Im Kwon-taek and Kim Ki-duk.

In 2009, he debuted as a filmmaker with the critically acclaimed romance melodrama film Cafe Noir which is based largely on the literary works by Johann Wolfgang von Goethe's The Sorrows of Young Werther and Fyodor Dostoyevsky's White Nights. For his effort, he was nominated for New Talent Grand Pix at the 2010 Copenhagen International Film Festival.

His second feature is the documentary Night and Fog in Zona (2015) about celebrated Chinese documentary filmmaker Wang Bing, who is well known for his nine-hour documentary Tie Xi Qu: West of the Tracks (2003). It follows Wang on his filming location, pries into his filmmaking secrets and delves into the question "what is film?."

His third work Cloud, Encore, a documentary on legendary Korean filmmaker Im Kwon-taek while Im shot his 102nd feature Revivre (2014), made its world premiere at the 23rd Busan International Film Festival in 2018.

== Filmography ==
- Ae-ran (1989) - screenwriter
- No. 3 (1997) - actor
- Beyond the Years (2007) - planner
- Cafe Noir (2009) - director, screenwriter
- Bleak Night (2010) - production department
- Ari Ari the Korean Cinema (2012) - actor
- Night and Fog in Zona (documentary, 2015) - director, editor
- Cloud, Encore (documentary, 2017) - director
- Gravity of the Tea (documentary, 2018) - director

== Awards ==
- 2019 6th Wildflower Film Awards: Best Director (Documentaries) (Night and Fog in Zona)

=== Honours ===
- Jury Chairman at the 2023 Busan International Film Festival for its main competition section "New Currents Award".
