= Microhabitat (film) =

2017 film by Jeon Go-woon

- Theatrical release poster
- Hangul: 소공녀
- Hanja: 小公女
- Lit.: A Little Princess
- RR: Sogongnyeo
- MR: Sogongnyŏ
- Directed by: Jeon Go-woon
- Written by: Jeon Go-woon
- Produced by: Kim Soon-mo
- Starring: Esom; Ahn Jae-hong
- Cinematography: Kim Tae-soo
- Edited by: Go Bong-gon
- Music by: Kwun Hyun-jeong
- Production company: Gwanghwamun Cinema
- Distributed by: CGV Arthouse
- Release dates: October 2017 (BIFF); March 22, 2018 (South Korea)
- Running time: 106 minutes
- Country: South Korea
- Language: Korean
- Box office: US$422,854

공 Microhabitat (Korean: 소공녀; RR: sogongnyeo; lit. 'A Little Princess') is a 2017 South Korean drama film written and directed by Jeon Go-woon.

== Plot ==
The plot is woven around the life of Miso, a thirty something year old woman who is willing to give up her basic necessities of life in order to protect what she treasures the most: cigarettes, whiskey and her boyfriend.

In 2015, Miso working as a housekeeper, finds her income barely enough to cover her expenses. When her landlord decides to increase the rent, she takes up more work to make ends meet. An increase in the price of cigarettes forces her to switch to a cheaper brand. Nonetheless, her calculations show her falling short of money by the end of the year. Pondering a bit over her main expenditures - rent, whiskey and cigarettes - she decides to do away with rent. She makes a list of her old band-mates, planning to stay with each of them for a while.

First one refuses to accommodate her citing her high-pressure job as the reason. The next, Hyeon Jeong was a keyboard player and warmly welcomes Miso into her marital home. Hyeon's husband objects privately, claiming the surprise guest would be an inconvenience for his parents and the couple argue loudly enough for Miso to hear. Among other things, Hyeon confesses to Miso her diffidence in cooking for her in-laws, who had run a restaurant for thirty years and her anger at having to do all of housework. In the morning, Miso cooks for her friend and leaves. She goes to the house of a drummer, Dae Yong, whom she had affectionately considered a younger brother. Dae has a room to spare since his 8-month old marriage has just broken down. But Miso's boyfriend, who is staying at an all-male dormitory provided by his factory, expresses feelings of inadequacy at Miso having to stay with a male friend. Miso moves out, spending the night in a restaurant. She calls on a guitarist (Woo Moon Gi) next. His parents are visibly elated and conspicuously hint at marriage to their son.

The next band-mate Miso visits is Choi Jeong-mi, who appears very well-off and has a large house. Recalling a previous instance when Miso had helped her out of debt, Choi Jeong-mi tells her she can stay as long as she wants. Free of having to pay rent at last, Miso builds up savings. In the meantime, her boyfriend reveals that he is fed up of his spartan life and that giving up his dreams of becoming a cartoonist, he has volunteered for an assignment in Saudi Arabia which would enable him to pay off his school debts in a couple of years. A conversation with Choi Jeong-mi's husband, where Miso refers to her wild past, annoys Choi Jeong-mi and Miso gets thrown out. Miso visits a number of apartments, each progressively worse, in search of a cheap place to stay but none appear within her means.

Cutting forward an unknown amount of time, all the band-mates except Miso are shown meeting up at a funeral, where they exchange perfunctory memories about Miso. A woman, with greying hair similar to Miso, is shown walking along and later in a portable tent pitched next to a highway.

== Cast ==
- Esom as Miso

A former musician who now works as a housekeeper that decides to leave her accommodation due to the increase in rental costs.

- Ahn Jae-hong as Han-sol

An aspiring online comic artist who hasn't found much success, and also the boyfriend of Mi-so.

- Choi Deok-moon as Kim Rok-yi
- Kim Jae-hwa as Choi Jeong-mi
- Kim Gook-hee as Jeong Hyeon-jeong
- Lee Sung-wook as Dae-yong
- Kang Jin-ah as Choi Moon-yeong
- Cho Soo-hyang as Min-ji
- Kim Ye-eun as Jae-kyung

== Production ==
Microhabitat is Jeon's feature debut. It was produced by independent production outlet Gwanghwamun Cinema, which Jeon founded in 2013.

== Release and reception ==
During the first two weeks since its release, Microhabitat had attracted 46,000 moviegoers.

Screen Anarchy highlighted the lead performance of Esom and reviewed the film as "vibrant and fun, yet always thoughtful and often poignant".

The rights to the film have been sold to multiple Asian countries including, Cambodia, Indonesia, Laos, Malaysia, Myanmar, Nepal, the Philippines, Singapore, Sri Lanka, Thailand, Vietnam and China.

== Awards and nominations ==
Awards	Category	Recipient	Result	Ref.
22nd Busan International Film Festival	CGV Arthouse Award	Microhabitat	Won	
54th Baeksang Arts Awards	Best New Director	Jeon Go-woon	Nominated	
43rd Seoul Independent Film Festival	Audience Award	Microhabitat	Won	
17th New York Asian Film Festival	Tiger Uncaged Award for Best Feature Film	Microhabitat	Won	
22nd Fantasia International Film Festival	AQCC-Camera Lucida Award	Microhabitat	Won	
27th Buil Film Awards	Best Actress	Esom	Nominated	
27th Buil Film Awards	Best New Director	Jeon Go-woon	Won	
55th Grand Bell Awards	Best New Director	Jeon Go-woon	Won	
55th Grand Bell Awards	Best Screenplay	Jeon Go-woon	Won	
55th Grand Bell Awards	Best Actress	Esom	Nominated	
Los Angeles Film Festival	Best Film	Microhabitat	Nominated	
38th Korean Association of Film Critics Awards	Top 11 Films	Microhabitat	Won	
38th Korean Association of Film Critics Awards	Best New Director	Jeon Go-woon	Won	
39th Blue Dragon Film Awards	Best Leading Actress	Esom	Nominated	
39th Blue Dragon Film Awards	Best New Director	Jeon Go-woon	Won	
39th Blue Dragon Film Awards	Best Screenplay	Jeon Go-woon	Nominated	
19th Busan Film Critics Awards	Best Actress	Esom	Won	
18th Director's Cut Awards	Best Independent Film Director	Microhabitat	Nominated	
18th Director's Cut Awards	Best New Director	Jeon Go-woon	Nominated	
Cine 21 Awards	Best New Director	Jeon Go-woon	Won	
19th Women in Film Korea Festival	Best Screenplay	Jeon Go-woon	Won	
6th Wildflower Film Awards	Best Director	Jeon Go-woon	Won	
6th Wildflower Film Awards	Best Actress	Esom	Won	
24th Chunsa Film Art Awards	Best Actress	Esom	Nominated	
24th Chunsa Film Art Awards	Best New Director	Jeon Go-woon	Nominated	
