= Kim Ui-seok =

South Korean film director

- Born: 6 July 1957 (age 68); Chollabuk-do, South Korea
- Occupation: Film director
- Years active: 1992-present

This article describes the 1957-born Korean director; for the 1983-born director of the same name, see After My Death by Kim Ui-seok (director, born 1983) (also spelled Kim Uiseok).

Kim Ui-seok (born 6 July 1957) is a South Korean film director. He has directed six films since 1992. His film Cheongpung myeongwol was screened in the Un Certain Regard section at the 2004 Cannes Film Festival. Ui-seok was also a producer on Na Hong-jin's The Yellow Sea.

== Filmography ==
- Gyeolhon iyagi (1992)
- Geu yeoja, geu namja (1993)
- Chongjabi (1995)
- Holiday in Seoul (1997)
- Bukkyeong banjeom (1999)
- Cheongpung myeongwol (2003)
