= Grass (2018 film) =

2018 film by Hong Sang-soo

- Theatrical release poster
- Hangul: 풀잎들
- RR: Pullipdeul
- MR: P'ulliptŭl
- Directed by: Hong Sang-soo
- Written by: Hong Sang-soo
- Produced by: Hong Sang-soo
- Starring: Kim Min-hee; Jung Jin-young; Gi Ju-bong
- Cinematography: Kim Hyung-koo
- Edited by: Son Yeon-ji
- Music by: Andrew Orkin
- Production company: Jeonwonsa Film
- Distributed by: Jeonwonsa Film; Contents Panda; Movement
- Release dates: February 16, 2018 (Berlin); October 25, 2018 (South Korea)
- Running time: 66 minutes
- Country: South Korea
- Language: Korean
- Box office: US$29,976

Grass (Korean: 풀잎들; RR: Pullipdeul) is a 2018 South Korean drama film written, produced, and directed by Hong Sang-soo. It was released theatrically on October 25, 2018.

== Premise ==
The story about a patron of a Seoul café who observes her fellow customers as they while away their days, drawing inspiration from their conversations for her writing.

== Cast ==
- Kim Min-hee as A-reum
- Jung Jin-young as Kyung-soo
- Gi Ju-bong as Chang-soo
- Seo Young-hwa as Sung-hwa
- Kim Sae-byuk as Ji-young
- Ahn Jae-hong as Hong-soo
- Gong Min-jeung as Mi-na
- Ahn Sun-young as Yeonju
- Shin Seok-ho as Jinho
- Kim Myung-soo as Jaemyung
- Lee Yoo-young as Soonyoung

== Awards and nominations ==
Year	Award	Category	Recipient	Result
2019	6th Wildflower Film Awards	Best Supporting Actress	Kim Sae-byuk	Won

== Production ==
Principal photography began on September 7, 2017, and wrapped on September 21, 2017.

The film marks the sixth collaboration between actress Kim Min-hee and director Hong Sang-soo.

== Release ==
The film premiered at the 68th Berlin International Film Festival on February 16, 2018. In early October 2018, the film was screened in the "Korean Cinema Today – Panorama" program of the 23rd Busan International Film Festival.
