= Night and Fog in Zona =

- Film poster
- Directed by: Jung Sung-il
- Screenplay by: Jung Sung-il
- Produced by: Kim Jong-won
- Starring: Wang Bing
- Cinematography: Yang Gunyoung; Lee Jin-keun
- Edited by: Park Young-un; Jung Sung-il
- Music by: Lee Ji-yeon
- Production company: KINO Film Production Co
- Release dates: October 4, 2015 (BIFF); November 29, 2018 (South Korea)
- Running time: 235 minutes
- Country: South Korea
- Language: Korean

Night and Fog in Zona (Korean: 천당의 밤과 안개; RR: Cheondangui bamgwa angae; lit. 'Heaven's Night and Fog') is a 2015 South Korean documentary film directed by Jung Sung-il. The cine-essay follows the Chinese filmmaker Wang Bing as he works on two of his projects, 'Til Madness Do Us Part (2013) and Alone (2013). Night and Fog in Zona made its world premiere at the 20th Busan International Film Festival in 2015.

== Content ==
Jung Sung-il has always envied the Paris audiences of Lumière brothers' documentary film La Sortie de l'Usine Lumière à Lyon of December 28, 1895, but not anymore. In the winter of 2003, when he watches his old friend Wang Bing's first film Tie Xi Qu: West of the Tracks at the International Film Festival Rotterdam, Jung decides it is the first day of the digital cinema and also the day he wants to make Night and Fog in Zona.

One day, Wang invites him to Yunnan, where he shoots a documentary. Jung follows with his camera, from a nameless suburb city to the jungle near the border with Laos, to record that winter and the story of the people of China.

== Cast ==
- Wang Bing

== Awards and nominations ==
Year	Award	Category	Recipient	Result
2019	6th Wildflower Film Awards	Best Director (Documentaries)	Jung Sung-il	Won

== Reception ==
Il manifesto called the film "one of the best non-fiction movies seen this year". while Filmmaker Magazine stated: "Night and Fog in Zonia is one of the most insightful and significant director portraits in contemporary cinema. While the film is guilty of some reductive mimicry — Sung-il applies Wang's principles to how he films and edits, even going so far as to outdo the running times of his recent films at four hours long — Zona goes beyond typical behind-the-scenes fare with unparalleled access to the acclaimed documentarian's process."

The film was screened at various festivals.

== See also ==
Despite its title, the film does not seem to be thematically related neither to Night and Fog nor to Night and Fog in Japan.
