= Choi Moo-sung =

South Korean actor (born 1968)

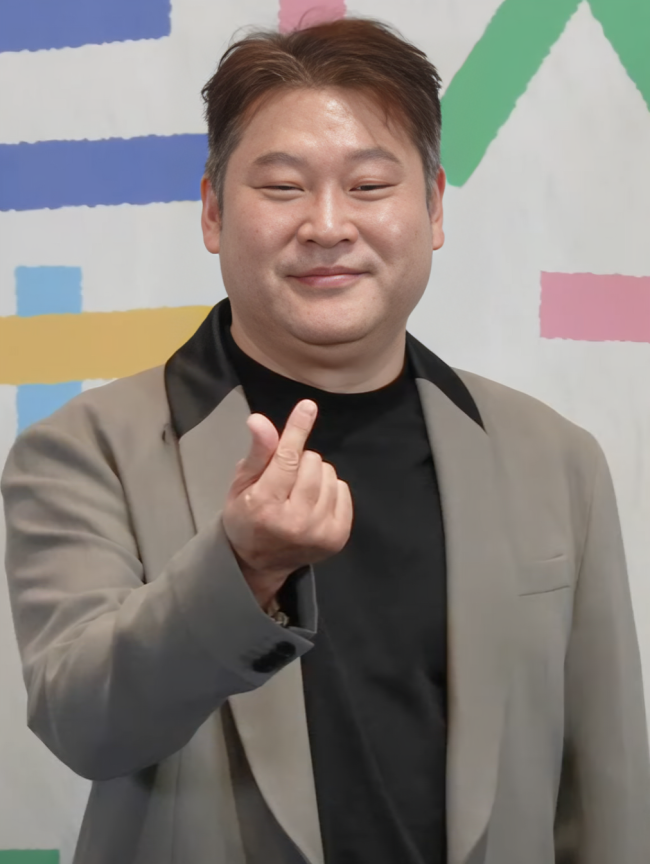
- Choi in October 2024
- Born: Choi Myung-soo; January 12, 1968 (age 58); Yeongdo District, Busan, South Korea
- Occupation: Actor
- Years active: 2002–present
- Agent: Billions

Korean name
- Hangul: 최명수
- RR: Choe Myeongsu
- MR: Ch'oe Myŏngsu

Stage name
- Hangul: 최무성
- RR: Choe Museong
- MR: Ch'oe Musŏng

Choi Myung-soo (Korean: 최명수; born January 12, 1968), better known by his stage name Choi Moo-sung (Korean: 최무성), is a South Korean actor.

== Filmography ==
Key
†	Denotes films that have not yet been released

=== Film ===
Year	Title	Role	Ref.
2002	Birth of a Man	Jang Soo-hye	
2005	Tale of Cinema	Gyungsan Province PD	
2006	Forbidden Quest	trader 1	
2006	Les Formidables	Chief Detective Park	
2006	Maundy Thursday	Priest Kim	
2007	Texture of Skin	Min-woo's older brother	
2007	Seven Days	Jung Chul-jin	
2007	The Wonder Years	Yeong-pyo	
2008	Beautiful	Detective Kim	
2008	Sa-kwa	Han-Soo	
2009	Missing Person	Won-young	
2009	A Million	Detective Kim	
2010	Bestseller	middle aged man 1	
2010	The Servant	Kwang Cheon	
2010	I Saw the Devil	Tae-joo	
2011	Detective K: Secret of the Virtuous Widow	Public officer	
2011	Drifting Away	director	
2011	Poongsan	Team Leader	
2012	Modern Family	husband (segment "Star Shaped Stain")	
2012	Grape Candy	Section Chief Kim	
2013	The Berlin File	Kang Min-ho	
2013	Very Ordinary Couple	Section Chief Kim	
2013	Intruders	cop	
2014	Venus Talk	Lee Sung-wook	
2015	Detective K: Secret of the Lost Island	Doo-mok	
2015	Empire of Lust	Jo Yeong-gyu	
2016	4th Place	Yeong-hoon	
2016	Snow Paths	Hunter	
2017	A Special Lady	Chairman Kim	
2017	Room No.7		
2017	The Discloser	Hyeon-seok	
2018	Last Child	Jin Sang-chul	
2019	A Resistance		
2019	Long Live The King	Hwang Bo-yoon	
2022	Hot Blooded	Yong-gang	
2022	Vanishing	Delivery man (Korean-French film)	
2022	Hot Blood: The Original	Yong-gang; Extended version	
2022	The Night Owl	Lee Hyung-ik	
2022	Birth	Kim Se-joon	
2024	About Family	Director Han	

=== Television series ===
Year	Title	Role	Ref.
2011	The Princess' Man	Ham-gwi	
2011	Living Among the Rich	Choi Moo-Sung	
2012	KBS Drama Special: Business District	Jung-ho	
2013	Heartless City	Moon Deok-bae	
2013	Empress Ki	Park Bool-hwa	
2014	KBS Drama Special: Youth	Coach	
2015	Heart to Heart	Butler Ahn Byung-yeol	
2015	Songgot: The Piercer	Lee Soo-In's father	
2015	Reply 1988	Choi Moosung	
2016	Uncontrollably Fond	Jang Jung-shik	
2016	Listen to Love	head of private detective agency (Cameo, Ep. 2)	
2016	Weightlifting Fairy Kim Bok-joo	Yoon Deok-man	
2017	The Rebel	King Seongjong	
2017	The Guardians	Yoon Seung-ro	
2017	Prison Playbook	Kim Min-chul	
2018	Mr. Sunshine	Jang Seung-goo	
2019	The Light in Your Eyes	an egg seller (Cameo, Ep. 5)	
2019	Nokdu Flower	Jeon Bongjun	
2019	Arthdal Chronicles	Gitoha	
2020	Hospital Playlist	Ik-joon's patient's husband (Cameo, Ep. 7)	
2020	Stranger	Woo Tae-ha	
2022	Insider	Song Doo-cheol	
2023	Joseon Attorney	Choo Young-woo	
2023	The Good Bad Mother	Song Woo-byeok	
2023	My Dearest	Yang-cheon	
2023	The First Responder 2	Seok Mun-go Cameo (episode 9)	
2023–2024	Like Flowers in Sand	Kim Tae-baek	
2024	Family by Choice	Kim Dae-wook	
2026	Reverse		

=== Television show ===
Year	Title	Role	Notes	Ref.
2025–2026	Reply 1988 10th Anniversary	Cast member		

== Awards and nominations ==
Name of the award ceremony, year presented, category, nominee of the award, and the result of the nomination
Award ceremony	Year	Category	Nominee / Work	Result	Ref.
Buil Film Awards	2019	Best Supporting Actor	Last Child	Nominated	
Golden Cinema Film Festival	2023	Best Supporting Actor	The Night Owl	Won	
Wildflower Film Awards	2017	Best Supporting Actor	Snow Paths	Won	
