= Yongsan District 4 Demolition Site fire =

Fire in Seoul, Korea

Yongsan District 4 Demolition Site Fire
- Native name: 용산4구역 철거현장 화재
- Date: January 20, 2009
- Time: approx. 7:20 (KST)
- Also known as: Yongsan Disaster
- Casualties: 6 (5 protestors, 1 police officer)
- Injuries: 23

On January 20, 2009, a fire started on the rooftop of a tower in Seoul's Yongsan District. At the time, the rooftop was occupied by around 30 tenants, who were protesting their evictions. The fire, which was subsequently called the Yongsan Disaster (Korean: 용산 참사; Hanja: 龍山慘事; RR: yongsan chamsa) or Yongsan Tragedy, caused six deaths and injured 23 people.

== Incident ==
On January 19, 2009, about 30 evicted residents held a sit-in protest in a temporary four-story tower built on the building's rooftop, demanding proper compensation after a decision to redevelop the area. 300 police officers were deployed to the site in response to the sit-in, which escalated as protesters threw projectiles and Molotov cocktails towards the police and police forces responded with water cannons. At 1:22 am on the 20th, the curtain wall of an adjacent commercial building caught fire after being hit by a Molotov cocktail thrown by protesters.

In preparation for the evacuation of the building by around 100 special police forces on the morning of the 20th, around 1,400 riot police were mobilized and the protesters were sprayed with water cannons from 6:12 AM. The special police forces were carried to the rooftop using a shipping container lifted by a crane at 6:45 AM. During the eviction, at around 7:20 AM, a fire started in a temporary structure on the rooftop, engulfing the rooftop within minutes according to witnesses.

The police special forces retreated and firefighters extinguished the fire in under an hour. Following the incident and searches of the rooftop and the temporary structure, six dead persons were found (five protesters, one police officer), as well as 23 injured (17 police officers, 6 protesters). 28 persons were arrested in relation to the incident.

== Reactions to the incident ==
The Seoul Central Prosecutors' Office investigated the incident and concluded that the fire was caused by the paint thinner used by protesters to make Molotov cocktails. The prosecution did not pursue criminal charges against the police forces, determining that they were not directly responsible for the fire and that the use of special police forces was legitimate. 20 protesters were found guilty of obstruction of justice and sentenced to jail terms ranging from three to four years.

Protesters claim that the fire was caused by a fuel additive which fell and lit when police forces removed beams from the temporary structure.

In February 2018 an internal fact-finding committee of the National Police Agency noted failures and irregularities in the police forces' approach to the protest. The committee noted that the standards for civil disturbances were not followed properly, and that the presence of flammable materials at the site was not accounted for.
