= List of South Korean films of 2026 =

The following is a list of South Korean films scheduled to be released in 2026.

== Box office ==
The highest-grossing South Korean films released in 2026, by domestic box office gross revenue, are as follows:

† Indicates films currently in theatrical release.

Highest-grossing films released in 2026
Rank	Title	Distributor	Domestic gross
1	The King's Warden	Showbox	₩163.31 billion (US$118.8 million)
2	Colony	Showbox	₩61.01 billion (US$43.6 million)
3	Hope	Megabox Plus M	₩49.07 billion (US$36.2 million)
4	The Assassin(s) †	Hive Media Corp	₩34.13 billion (US$25.6 million)
5	Salmokji: Whispering Water	Showbox	₩33.33 billion (US$22.1 million)
6	Tazza: The Song of Beelzebub †	CJ Entertainment	₩21.02 billion (US$15.7 million)
7	Humint	Next Entertainment World	₩20.00 billion (US$13.3 million)
8	The Eyes	By4M Studio	₩15.90 billion (US$11.2 million)

== Released ==
=== January–March ===
Opening		English title	Native title	Director(s)	Cast	Ref.
J A N U A R Y	14	Boy	보이	Lee Sang-deok	Jo Byeong-kyu, Yoo In-soo, Jini, Seo In-guk	
J A N U A R Y	14	Heartman: Rock and Love	하트맨	Choi Won-sub	Kwon Sang-woo, Moon Chae-won, Kim Seo-heon, Park Ji-hwan, Pyo Ji-hoon	
J A N U A R Y	14	Shinbi's Haunted House: One More Summon	신비아파트 10주년 극장판: 한 번 더, 소환	Byun Young-kyu	Cho Hyun-jung, Kim Young-eun, Yang Jeong-hwa, Shin Yong-woo, Yeo Min-jeong, Shim Kyu-hyuck	
J A N U A R Y	21	Project Y	프로젝트 Y	Lee Hwan	Han So-hee, Jeon Jong-seo, Kim Shin-rok, Jung Young-joo, Lee Jae-kyoon, YooA, Kim Sung-cheol	
J A N U A R Y	21	Sugar	슈가	Choi Sin-choon	Choi Ji-woo, Min Jin-woong, Ko Dong-ha	
J A N U A R Y	28	Sister	시스터	Jin Sung-moon	Jung Ji-so, Lee Soo-hyuk, Cha Joo-young	
F E B R U A R Y	4	The King's Warden	왕과 사는 남자	Jang Hang-jun	Yoo Hae-jin, Park Ji-hoon, Yoo Ji-tae, Jeon Mi-do	
F E B R U A R Y	11	Humint	휴민트	Ryoo Seung-wan	Zo In-sung, Park Jeong-min, Park Hae-joon, Shin Se-kyung	
F E B R U A R Y	11	Number One	넘버원	Kim Tae-yong	Choi Woo-shik, Jang Hye-jin, Gong Seung-yeon	
F E B R U A R Y	20	Pavane	파반느	Lee Jong-pil	Go Ah-sung, Byun Yo-han, Moon Sang-min	
M A R C H	4	Everyday We Are	우리는 매일매일	Kim Min-jae	Kim Sae-ron, Lee Chae-min	
M A R C H	4	Mad Dance Office	매드 댄스 오피스	Jo Hyun-jin	Yeom Hye-ran, Choi Sung-eun	
M A R C H	11	Samakdo	삼악도	Chae Ki-jun	Jo Yun-seo, Kwak Si-yang	
M A R C H	18	Method Acting	메소드연기	Lee Ki-hyuk	Lee Dong-hwi, Yoon Kyung-ho, Kang Chan-hee, Kim Geum-soon, Yoon Byung-hee, Gong Min-jeung	

=== April–June ===
Opening		English title	Native title	Director(s)	Cast	Ref.
A P R I L	1	Judge Girl	소녀심판	Ryu Kwang-hyun	Chae Won-bin, Kang Hee-gu, Yoo Hyun-soo, Han Sun-hwa, Hwang Ji-ah, Jo Bok-rae, Shin Ji-seop, Choi Jun-young	
A P R I L	2	The Ultimate Duo	끝장수사	Park Chul-hwan	Bae Seong-woo, Jung Ga-ram, Esom, Jo Han-chul, Yoon Kyung-ho	
A P R I L	8	Salmokji: Whispering Water	살목지	Lee Sang-min	Kim Hye-yoon, Lee Jong-won, Kim Jun-han, Kim Young-sung, Oh Dong-min, Yoon Jae-chan, Jang Da-ah	
A P R I L	15	My Name	내 이름은	Chung Ji-young	Yeom Hye-ran, Shin Woo-bin, Choi Jun-woo, Park Ji-bin	
A P R I L	22	Audition 109	짱구	Jung Woo, Oh Seong-ho	Jung Woo, Jung Soo-jung, Shin Seung-ho, Hyun Bong-sik, Jo Beom-gyu, Kwon So-hyun	
M A Y	13	Teaching Practice: Idiot Girls and School Ghost 2	교생실습	Kim Min-ha	Han Sun-hwa, Hong Ye-ji, Lee Yeo-reum, Lee Hwa-won, Yoo Seon-ho	
M A Y	21	Colony	군체	Yeon Sang-ho	Jun Ji-hyun, Koo Kyo-hwan, Ji Chang-wook, Kim Shin-rok, Shin Hyun-been, Go Soo	
M A Y	29	Strange Snack Shop Jeoncheondang	이상한 과자가게 전천당	Park Bong-sub	Ra Mi-ran, Lee Re	
J U N E	3	Wild Sing	와일드 씽	Son Jae-gon	Gang Dong-won, Uhm Tae-goo, Park Ji-hyun, Oh Jung-se	
J U N E	17	The Guardian	납치 48시간	Jeong Jang-hwan	Nam Woo-hyun, Park Eun-hye, Han Jae-suk	
J U N E	19	Husbands in Action	남편들	Park Gyu-tae	Jin Seon-kyu, Gong Myung, Kim Ji-seok, Yoon Kyung-ho, Kang Han-na, Lee Da-hee, Jeon So-min	
J U N E	24	Summer's Camera	여름의 카메라	Divine Sung	Kim Si-a, Kwak Min-gyu, Yu Ga-eun	
J U N E	24	The Eyes	눈동자	Yeom Ji-ho	Shin Min-a, Kim Nam-hee	

=== July–September ===
Opening		English title	Native title	Director(s)	Cast	Ref.
J U L Y	1	The Second Child	그림자 아이	Yu Eun-jeong	Park So-yi, Jeon Yu-na, Im Soo-jung	
J U L Y	8	Hana Korea	하나 코리아	Frederik Sølberg	Kim Min-ha, Kim Joo-ryoung, Ahn Seo-hyun	
J U L Y	15	Hope	호프	Na Hong-jin	Hwang Jung-min, Zo In-sung, Jung Ho-yeon, Taylor Russell, Cameron Britton, Alicia Vikander, Michael Fassbender	
A U G U S T	12	Okay! Madam 2	오케이 마담2	Lee Cheol-ha	Uhm Jung-hwa, Park Sung-woong, Lee Sang-yoon, Bae Jung-nam, Park Jin-joo, Ryeoun, Choi Soo-young	
A U G U S T	26	The Journey to Gyeongju	경주기행	Kim Mi-jo	Lee Jung-eun, Gong Hyo-jin, Park So-dam, Lee Yeon, Byun Yo-han	
S E P T E M B E R	2	Portrait of a Family	비광	Lee Ji-won	Ryu Seung-ryong, Ha Ji-won, Kim Si-a	
S E P T E M B E R	16	The Intern	인턴	Kim Do-young	Choi Min-sik, Han So-hee	
S E P T E M B E R	23	Possible Love	가능한 사랑	Lee Chang-dong	Jeon Do-yeon, Sul Kyung-gu, Zo In-sung, Cho Yeo-jeong	
S E P T E M B E R	23	Tazza: The Song of Beelzebub	타짜: 벨제붑의 노래	Choi Kook-hee	Byun Yo-han, Roh Jae-won, Ayaka Miyoshi, Jo Woo-jin, Yoon Kyung-ho	
S E P T E M B E R	23	The Assassin(s)	암살자(들)	Hur Jin-ho	Yoo Hae-jin, Park Hae-il, Lee Min-ho	
S E P T E M B E R	30	Reawaken Man: The Red	부활남: 더 레드	Baek Jong-yul	Koo Kyo-hwan, Shin Seung-ho, Kang Ki-young, Kim Si-a, Kim Sung-ryung	

=== October–December ===
Opening		English title	Native title	Director(s)	Cast	Ref.
O C T O B E R	21	Killing Time	킬링타임	Jang Joon-yeop	Ryu Hye-young, Nam Yoon-su	
O C T O B E R	21	Nowhere to Lay My Eyes	눈둘데가 없네	Hong Sang-soo	Kim Min-hee, Choi Myung-gil	
O C T O B E R	21	Paradise Lost	실낙원	Yeon Sang-ho	Kim Hyun-joo, Bae Hyun-sung	
O C T O B E R	21	Still Shining	여전히 찬란하게	Song Il-gon	Kim Hye-ja, Cha Mi-kyung, Park Seo-kyung, Choi Ju-eun	
O C T O B E R	28	Ugly Duckling Ms. Maeng	수능, 출제의 비밀	Lee Yong-jae	Lee Sun-bin, Yoo Jae-myung, Kim Young-min, Jeon Seok-ho	
N O V E M B E R	4	Final Interview	최종면접	Kim Jung-hoon	Cho Yi-hyun, Kim Jae-won, Shin Seung-ho, Kang You-seok, Kwak Dong-yeon, Bae Gang-hee	
N O V E M B E R	4	The Table: Day and Night	낮과 밤은 서로에게	Kim Jong-kwan	Kim Min-ha, Joo Jong-hyuk, Han Sun-hwa, Chang Ryul, Shim Eun-kyung, Lee Hee-jun	
N O V E M B E R	18	White Blast	폭설	Hong Eui-jeong, Park Sun-woo	Kim Yoon-seok, Koo Kyo-hwan	
N O V E M B E R	25	Tristes Tropiques	슬픈 열대	Park Hoon-jung	Lee Shin-young, Park Yu-rim, Kim Myung-min, Park Hae-soo, Austin Lin, Chen Yi-wen, Wang Po-chieh	
N O V E M B E R	25	My Home	완벽한 집	Jung Yong-ki	Bae Jong-ok, Jang Gyu-ri, Kim Min-chul	
D E C E M B E R	2	Cattle Run	정가네	Kim Ji-hyun	Ryu Seung-ryong, Park Hae-joon	
D E C E M B E R	30	New Recruit: Haunted Military Hospital	신병 더 무비: 군병원에 귀신이 산다	Min Jin-gi	Kim Min-ho, Ryu Kyung-soo, Jeongyeon, Nam Tae-woo, Lee Jung-hyun, Jeon Seung-hun, Kim Hyun-kyu	
D E C E M B E R	30	Seven O'Clock Breakfast Club for the Brokenhearted	실연당한 사람들을 위한 일곱 시 조찬모임	Lim Sun-ae	Bae Suzy, Lee Jin-wook, Yoo Ji-tae, Keum Sae-rok	

== See also ==
- 2026 in South Korea
- 2026 in film
- List of 2026 box office number-one films in South Korea
- List of South Korean films of 2025
