= The 12th Suspect =

- Directed by: Kim Myoung-sung
- Written by: Kim Myoung-sung
- Produced by: Yoon Ming-young
- Starring: Kim Sang-kyung; Heo Sung-tae; Park Sun-young; Kim Dong-young; Jeong Ji-sun; Jang Won-young; Kim Ji-hoon; Nam Yeon-woo; Na Do-yul; Kim Hee-sang; Han Ji-an; Myung Gye-Nam; Nam Seong-jin
- Cinematography: Park Jong-chul
- Music by: Jawan Koo
- Production company: Indie Story
- Release date: 10 October 2019 (South Korea)
- Running time: 106 minutes
- Country: South Korea
- Language: Korean

The 12th Suspect (Korean: 열두 번째 용의자) is a 2019 South Korean mystery thriller film directed by Kim Myoung-sung, starring Kim Sang-kyung, Heo Sung-tae, Park Sun-young, Kim Dong-young, Jeong Ji-sun, Jang Won-young, Kim Ji-hoon, Nam Yeon-woo, Na Do-yul, Kim Hee-sang, Han Ji-an, Myung Gye-Nam and Nam Seong-jin.

== Cast ==
- Kim Sang-kyung as Kim Ki-Chae
- Heo Sung-tae as No Suk-Hyun
- Park Sun-young as Jang Sun-Hwa
- Kim Dong-young as Park In-Sung
- Jeong Ji-sun as Woo Byung-Hong
- Jang Won-young as Moon Bong-Woo
- Kim Ji-hoon as Oh Haeng-Chul
- Nam Yeon-woo as Jang-Hyuk
- Na Do-yul as Kim Hyuk-Soo
- Kim Hee-sang as Lee Ki-Seob
- Han Ji-an as Choi Yoo-jung
- Myung Gye-Nam as Shin Yoon-Chi
- Nam Seong-jin as Baek Doo-hwan
- Ko Han-min

== Reception ==
Elizabeth Kerr of The Hollywood Reporter wrote that while " there are points where the story loses focus", Kim and Heo "do a lovely job of anchoring the philosophical rift at the heart of the story."

Richard Kuipers of Variety wrote that this "very well performed chamber piece is expertly controlled", and that it "lulls viewers into a sense of calm and order before going for the jugular."

Pierce Conran of ScreenAnarchy wrote that while the film "has the making of an engaging mystery", and "remains worth watching for the performances", due to "stilted theatrical style and literary pretensions, it never quite comes together as a gripping yarn".
