= Believer (2018 South Korean film) =

2018 South Korean crime action film

- Theatrical release poster
- Hangul: 독전
- RR: Dokjeon
- MR: Tokchŏn
- Directed by: Lee Hae-young
- Screenplay by: Jeong Seo-kyeong; Lee Hae-young
- Based on: Drug War by Johnnie To
- Produced by: Jung Hee-soon
- Starring: Cho Jin-woong; Ryu Jun-yeol; Kim Sung-ryung; Park Hae-joon; Cha Seung-won; Kim Joo-hyuk
- Cinematography: Kim Tae-kyung
- Edited by: Yang Jin-mo
- Music by: Dalpalan
- Production companies: Yong Film; Kidari Ent
- Distributed by: Next Entertainment World
- Release date: May 22, 2018
- Running time: 123 minutes
- Country: South Korea
- Language: Korean
- Box office: US$39.2 million

Believer (Korean: 독전; RR: Dokjeon) is a 2018 South Korean action crime film directed by Lee Hae-young. It is a remake of the 2012 Johnnie To film Drug War. The film features actor Kim Joo-hyuk's final film performance. The film was released in South Korea on May 22, 2018. An extended version was released theatrically on July 18, 2018.

A sequel, titled Believer 2, was released on Netflix on November 17, 2023.

== Plot ==
Won-ho is a police detective obsessed with taking down Asia's biggest drug cartel, run by a mysterious, unseen kingpin known as "Mr. Lee." Because Lee's identity is a secret, rival dealers frequently pose as him. Won-ho enlists Cha Soo-jeong, a delinquent youth he cares for like a niece, to go undercover. However, she is ambushed and dies in the emergency room, leaving behind a cryptic dying message: an infinity shape (∞).

Days later, Oh Yeon-ok, a cartel executive who recently survived a targeted explosion, attempts to turn herself in. Before she can unmask Mr. Lee, she is poisoned and dies. Investigating the explosion site, Won-ho’s team finds a lone survivor: Rak, a low-level gang member. After Won-ho reveals that Rak’s mother died in the blast and rescues his injured pet dog, a vengeful Rak agrees to cooperate with the police.

Rak arranges a meeting with Jin Ha-rim, a volatile Chinese-Korean drug lord. To ensnare him, the police orchestrate a fake transaction involving a potent new drug called "Laika." Won-ho studies Ha-rim's mannerisms, allowing him to masquerade as the drug lord during a parallel meeting with Park Sun-chang, an ambitious criminal in Lee's network. To protect his cover, Won-ho is forced to snort Laika, triggering intense hallucinations of Soo-jeong before his team stabilizes him.

The sting succeeds, securing raw materials from Ha-rim. Rak takes them to a rural lab where Dong-young and Joo-young, a pair of brilliant deaf-mute siblings, synthesize the drug. Meanwhile, a suspicious new player, Director Brian, arrives at the lab under Won-ho's distant watch. Won-ho’s background check reveals Brian used the same infinity symbol in his past profession, while also uncovering that Rak was adopted into a drug-trafficking family.

Chaos erupts when Ha-rim’s girlfriend, Bo-ryung, kidnaps Won-ho and Rak. In the ensuing shootout, Ha-rim is killed by Rak, Bo-ryung overdoses, and a rigged explosion kills one of Won-ho's officers. Driven by grief, Won-ho targets Brian, convinced he is Mr. Lee after spotting him wearing an infinity-symbol ring. While Won-ho's team raids Brian's base, Rak abducts Brian and reveals that he is the real Mr. Lee. Rak severely burns Brian as retribution for the explosion that killed his mother and injured his dog.

Won-ho finds the mutilated Brian, who is framed by the media as the captured "Mr. Lee." While his superior, Department Head Choi, insists this was a necessary outcome, Won-ho is left unsatisfied with the result of the case. He goes back, only to discover Rak's dog missing. Realizing the dog's true name is Laika—meaning Rak named the drug after his pet—Won-ho uses a hidden GPS tracker to trail Rak to a snowy cabin with the deaf-mute siblings. The two men sit with their guns on the table, and Won-ho asks Rak if he has ever been happy. The camera moves outside as a single gunshot echoes. The extended cut confirms the outcome: a bloody Won-ho leaves the house, revealing Rak was the one shot.

== Cast ==
- Cho Jin-woong as Won-ho, a detective of the Narcotic Unit
- Ryu Jun-yeol as Seo Young-rak, a low level drug dealer
- Kim Sung-ryung as Oh Yeon-ok
- Park Hae-joon as Seon-chang, a henchman of Lee's drug cartel and the superior of Rak
- Cha Seung-won as Brian Lee, a director of an industrial company and secretly operates an illegal drug testing lab
- Kim Joo-hyuk as Jin Ha-rim, a Chinese-Korean drug lord
- Nam Moon-chul as Department Head Choi
- Jung Jun-won as Deok-cheon
- Jin Seo-yeon as Bo-ryeong, Ha-rim's eccentric girlfriend
- Kang Seung-hyun as So-yeon
- Seo Hyun-woo as Jeong-il
- Kim Dong-young as Manko, a deaf-mute drug cook and the brother of Rona
- Lee Joo-young as Rona, a deaf-mute drug cook and the sister of Manko
- Jung Ga-ram as Dong-woo, a rookie police officer working with Won-ho's Narcotics unit
- Keum Sae-rok as Soo-jeong, a troubled teenage informant of Won-ho's
- Park Sung-yeon as a Sign language interpreter

== Production ==
Principal photography began on 1 July and ended on November 16, 2017.

== Release ==
Believer premiered in South Korean cinemas on May 22, 2018.

== Reception ==
=== Critical response ===
On review aggregator Rotten Tomatoes, the film has an approval rating of 83% based on 18 reviews and an average rating of 5.9/10. Metacritic assigned the film a score of 58 out of 100 based on 5 critics, indicating "mixed or average reviews".

Richard Kuipers of Variety gave a positive review and wrote, "Believer may be more impressive around the edges than at its core, but that doesn't prevent it from delivering a pretty solid two hours of action and suspense that's muscularly directed by Lee and stylishly shot by Kim Tae-kyung. Punching the narrative along is a terrific, predominantly electronic, score by ace composer Dalpalan. All other technical work is spot on."

Cary Darling of the Houston Chronicle rated the film 3.5 out of 5 and said, "Lee Hae-yeong's gripping retelling of Johnnie To's Drug War...stands on its own and is different enough from the original to make it less a clone and more of a genuflection."

Simon Abrams of RogerEbert.com rated the film 2 out of 4 and said, "Believer doesn't add up to much because Lee and Chung essentially tried to improve something that was already perfectly unsettling."

=== Box office ===
According to the Korean Film Council Believer surpassed one million moviegoers in five days, becoming the fastest Korean movie to accomplish this milestone in 2018. A total of 1,004,563 people had seen the movie as of 26 May.

The film had attracted 3,001,539 moviegoers by June 2, and became the fastest Korean film to surpass three million moviegoers in twelve days this year. During the second weekend at the box office the film held 63.4% of the weekend sales by selling 981,000 tickets at 1,531 screens.

Believer became the first Korean film to surpass five million admissions in 2018. The film was seen by a total of 5,063,620 people by September 29, 2018, way exceeding its break-even point of 2.8 million admissions.

== Sequel ==
A sequel to the film, titled Believer 2 has been confirmed by Netflix, which will be directed by Baek Jong-yul with the cast of Cho Jin-woong, Cha Seung-won, Han Hyo-joo, Oh Seung-hoon, Kim Dong-young, and Lee Joo-young.

== Awards and nominations ==
Awards	Category	Recipient	Result	Ref.
27th Buil Film Awards	Best Supporting Actor	Kim Joo-hyuk	Nominated	
27th Buil Film Awards	Best Supporting Actor	Park Hae-joon	Nominated	
27th Buil Film Awards	Best Supporting Actress	Jin Seo-yeon	Nominated	
27th Buil Film Awards	Best Supporting Actress	Lee Joo-young	Nominated	
27th Buil Film Awards	Best Cinematography	Kim Tae-kyung	Nominated	
27th Buil Film Awards	Best Music	Dalpalan	Nominated	
27th Buil Film Awards	Best Art Direction	Lee Ha-joon	Nominated	
55th Grand Bell Awards	Best Actor	Cho Jin-woong	Nominated	
55th Grand Bell Awards	Best Supporting Actor	Kim Joo-hyuk	Won	
55th Grand Bell Awards	Best Supporting Actress	Jin Seo-yeon	Won	
55th Grand Bell Awards	Best Cinematography	Kim Tae-kyung	Nominated	
55th Grand Bell Awards	Best Art Direction	Lee Ha-joon	Nominated	
55th Grand Bell Awards	Best Music	Dalpalan	Nominated	
55th Grand Bell Awards	Technical Award	Believer	Nominated	
2nd The Seoul Awards	Best Supporting Actress	Jin Seo-yeon	Nominated	
39th Blue Dragon Film Awards	Best Supporting Actor	Kim Joo-hyuk	Won	
39th Blue Dragon Film Awards	Best Supporting Actress	Lee Joo-young	Nominated	
39th Blue Dragon Film Awards	Best Supporting Actress	Jin Seo-yeon	Nominated	
39th Blue Dragon Film Awards	Best Music	Dalpalan	Won	
5th Korean Film Producers Association Awards	Best Supporting Actress	Jin Seo-yeon	Won	
5th Korean Film Producers Association Awards	Best Editing	Yang Jin-mo	Won	
5th Korean Film Producers Association Awards	Best Soundtrack	Dalpalan	Won	
55th Baeksang Arts Awards	Best Director	Lee Hae-young	Nominated	
55th Baeksang Arts Awards	Best Supporting Actor	Kim Joo-hyuk	Won	
55th Baeksang Arts Awards	Best Supporting Actor	Park Hae-joon	Nominated	
55th Baeksang Arts Awards	Best Supporting Actress	Jin Seo-yeon	Nominated	
55th Baeksang Arts Awards	Best New Actress	Lee Joo-young	Nominated	
55th Baeksang Arts Awards	Technical Award	Yang Jin-mo (editing)	Nominated	
