= Only God Knows Everything =

- Film poster
- Hangul: 온리 갓 노우즈 에브리띵
- RR: Olli gat noujeu ebeuritting
- MR: Olli kat noujŭ ebŭritting
- Directed by: Paek Seung-hwan
- Screenplay by: Kim Sung-jin; Paek Seung-hwan
- Story by: Ko Joon-seok
- Produced by: Yi Yu-jeong
- Starring: Shin Seung-ho; Han Ji-eun; Park Myung-hoon; Jeon So-min
- Cinematography: Shin Hyun-kyu
- Edited by: Kim Sung-hoon
- Music by: Lee Sang-hoon
- Production company: Vac.grimm
- Distributed by: Triple Pictures; kth
- Release date: August 22, 2025
- Running time: 115 minutes
- Country: South Korea
- Language: Korean

Only God Knows Everything (Korean: 온리 갓 노우즈 에브리띵) is a 2025 South Korean mystery thriller film directed by Paek Seung-hwan.

== Plot ==
While hearing a believer's confession shortly after being ordained a priest, Do-woon learns a shocking truth about his mother's disappearance 13 years ago. Torn between the seal of confession and a desire for revenge, he finally decides to uncover the truth behind the incident.

== Cast ==
- Shin Seung-ho as Jeong Do-woon: A young Catholic priest who was raised by Father Johan after his mother's disappearance;
- Han Ji-eun as Yoon Joo-young: A homicide detective investigating the Jeonsingyo sect;
- Park Myung-hoon as Shim Gwang-woon: A bizarre and violent shaman;
- Jeon So-min as Paek Soo-yeon: A fanatic woman involved in the Jeonsingyo sect;
- Lee Joong-ock as Gong Woon-chul: Soo-yeon's husband;
- Lee Ji-hyun as Lee Ho-yeon: A deaf-mute woman, sister of the man from whom Do-woon heard the confession;
- You Soong-joo as Father Johan: The priest who raised Do-woon after his mother's disappearance;
- Shin Seo-woo as Sun-woo: The sickly son of Soo-yeon and Woon-chul.

== Production ==
The film is the first production of CJ ENM's O'pen project, which is dedicated to discovering and developing new creative talent. Ko Joon-seok's original screenplay made it to the top six of the competition and caught the attention of director Paek Seung-hwan, who decided to use the story to explore his doubts about faith and religion. The original title was At the Border (Korean: 경계인; RR: Gyeonggyein): Only God Knows Everything, but Paek was so intrigued by the subtitle that he decided to retitle the film.

Filming began on March 3, 2023, and five days later, it was announced that the main cast would consist of Shin Seung-ho, Han Ji-eun, Park Myung-hoon, and Jeon So-min, while You Soong-joo, Lee Jung-ok, and Nam Joong-kyu would play supporting roles. The crew wrapped filming in November 2023.

Shin Seung-ho had previously been directed by Paek in Double Patty (2021), forming a close friendship with him; the director didn't say much when he offered him the lead role in Only God Knows Everything, other than that he thought Shin would look good in a cassock. Shin accepted because the character had little in common with him or his previous work, thus presenting a challenge. Being a Protestant, the actor interacted with several Catholic priests to better understand the role.

Park Myung-hoon gained 10 kg (22 lb) to play the role of the shaman. Jeon So-min was cast because Paek was impressed by her intense gaze in the 2021–2022 TV series Show Window: The Queen's House, even though the role was originally intended for an older actress.

The soundtrack was entirely composed, arranged and performed by Lee Sang-hoon for 4Bros. Music and was released on streaming platforms on August 22, 2025, the same date as the film.

== Promotion ==
On July 14, 2025, four individual posters for the lead actors were released, each featuring an individual tagline. A week later, the main poster was released, accompanied by the phrase "A shocking confession. Will he keep it a secret or seek revenge?". The trailer was uploaded online on July 28, revealing the theatrical release date of August 22. On August 6, a special poster featuring Shin Seung-ho with an anguished expression and a rosary in his hand was released.

On August 13, the main cast and the director presented the film to the public and press at the Megabox COEX. On August 24, Shin and Han appeared on a taped episode of actor Yoo Yeon-seok's talk show Yoobari Talkbari to promote the film.

== Distribution ==
Only God Knows Everything was invited to participate in the Korean Fantastic: Feature-Lengths section of the 29th Bucheon International Fantastic Film Festival, where it had its world premiere on July 6 and 8, 2025, receiving an enthusiastic response from audiences.

It was released in South Korea on August 22, 2025, after two days of special screenings at CGV, Lotte Cinema, and Megabox theaters at a reduced price. The film was given a 15 rating by the Korea Media Rating Board due to scenes of murder and physical injury, elements that induce tension and fear, foul language, and allusions to drug use.

On October 10, 2025, it was made available on the IPTV and VOD services KT Genie TV, SK B TV, LG U+TV, KT Skylife, Watcha, Wavve, Coupang Play, and YouTube Movies. On December 12, it was released on Netflix.

== Reception ==
=== Box office ===
Only God Knows Everything opened at number ninth at the South Korean box office on the August 22–24 weekend with US$73,815, for a total gross of US$91,924. When it was pulled from theaters it had not even reached 30,000 viewers, but it was a success on Netflix, ranking second in the Top 10 Korean films a day after its release on the platform.

=== Critical reception ===
For Yoo Su-kyung of Hankook Ilbo, the film "evokes a profound sense of ambivalence rather than exhilaration, forcing us to question what true salvation is" thanks to a compelling story and an ending that "further enhances the film's lingering impact." She praised the cast, finding Shin and Jeon to present a different image than in their previous works; in particular, Shin "surprises viewers with his earnest and profound performance." Lee Da-won of Sports Kyunghyang also praised the cast, but not the film, which she deemed too fragmented to address a complex theme like faith. Kim Kyung-hee of iMBC Entertainment expressed doubts about the ending, which "leaves viewers with considerable thought and debate on how to interpret it", but like her colleagues, she judged the cast's acting to be "impressive", calling Jeon So-min and Park Myung-hoon "truly divine" and commenting that "[Shin's] deep voice is captivating enough to convert even non-believers". For Seo Ji-hyeon of Sports Seoul, Only God Knows Everything is disappointing considering the actors' ability, as the process of resolving the dilemma of religious beliefs clashing with personal values is "tedious" and the film "struggles to incorporate numerous characters and multiple messages", which "results in individual battles rather than synergy" between the subplots.

=== Accolades ===
Name of the award ceremony, year presented, category, nominee of the award, and the result of the nomination
Award	Year	Category	Nominee / Work	Result	Ref.
Cinematography & Photography Award	2024	Best Asian Film	Only God Knows Everything	Won	
Cinematography & Photography Award	2024	Best Actress (Short/Feature/Music Video)	Han Ji-eun	Won	
Cinematography & Photography Award	2024	Best Actor (Short/Feature/Music Video)	Shin Seung-ho	Won	
Hollywood International Diversity Film Festival	2024	Best Director	Paek Seung-hwan	Won	
Hollywood International Diversity Film Festival	2024	Best Actor	Shin Seung-ho	Won	
Kyoto Independent Film Festival	2025	Best Actor	Shin Seung-ho	Won	
Montreal Independent Film Festival	2025	Best Actor	Shin Seung-ho	Won	
New York Independent Art Film Festival	2025	Best Director	Paek Seung-hwan	Won	
Santa Barbara International Film Festival	2024	Best Feature Film	Only God Knows Everything	Won	
Santa Fe Movie Award	2024	Best Feature Film	Only God Knows Everything	Won	
Toronto Art Film Spirit Award	2025	Best Director	Paek Seung-hwan	Won	
