= Jung Joon-won =

Jung Joon-won may refer to:

- Jung Joon-won (actor, born 1988), South Korean actor
- Jung Joon-won (actor, born 2004), South Korean actor
