= Double Patty (disambiguation) =

Double Patty is a 2021 South Korean drama film.

Double Patty may also refer to:

- Double cheeseburger, a cheeseburger with two patties

== Film and television ==
- Double Patty (2015 short film), a 2015 Australian short film

== See also ==
- Double Patti, a type of turban
