= Shades of the Heart =

2019 film by Kim Jong-kwan

- Theatrical release poster
- Directed by: Kim Jong-kwan
- Written by: Kim Jong-kwan
- Produced by: Gu Jung-ah
- Starring: Yeon Woo-jin; Kim Sang-ho; Lee Ji-eun; Lee Joo-young; Yoon Hye-ri
- Cinematography: Kim Tae-soo
- Edited by: Won Chang-jae
- Music by: Narae Kim
- Production company: Bol Media
- Distributed by: Atnine Film Co., Ltd.
- Release dates: 2 February 2019 (Jeonju); 31 March 2021 (South Korea)
- Running time: 83 minutes
- Country: South Korea
- Language: Korean
- Box office: $155,368

Shades of the Heart (Korean: 아무도 없는 곳; RR: Amudo eomneun got; lit. 'Where Nobody Is') is a 2019 South Korean drama film written and directed by Kim Jong-kwan, and starring Yeon Woo-jin, Kim Sang-ho, Lee Ji-eun, Lee Joo-young, and Yoon Hye-ri.

== Plot ==
After getting divorced overseas, a novelist Chang-seok returns to Korea and readies to publish a novel based on his own life experience. He then meets the aimless Mi-young at a cafe located inside a bustling subway station in Euljiro who recollects her meeting with him and their past together. Chang-seok also meets his editor, Yoo-jin, who shares a leftover cigarette with him and thinks about her past. Next, he accidentally runs into a photographer Sung-ha who's taking care of his ailing wife. Last, Chang-seok shares a conversation with bartender Joo-eun, who tries to remember her memories from her patrons lost after a car accident.

Upon meeting each others, they explore slightly different themes, but each is connected with a shared feeling of loss and insecurity as each character struggles to remain sane in a society that evokes feelings of existential dread. This marks Chang-seok and changes his feelings and mind, also making him choose to begin writing yet another new story.

== Cast ==
- Yeon Woo-jin as Chang-seok

Rich and realistic, he has a placid voice and expressive eyes. He hides his sadness underneath a prosaic exterior. However, the extent of grief over his divorce and the death of their child becomes increasingly visible, and many of his encounters reveal other achingly human stories of loss.

- Kim Sang-ho as Sung-ha

A photographer and devoted husband who clings to hope, believing in a mystical remedy that might cure his ailing wife.

- Lee Ji-eun as Mi-young

Trapped between illusion and reality, Mi-young is aimless and loves solitude, but she always welcomes friendships.

- Lee Joo-young as Joo-eun

A former model turned bartender who engages in honest and candid conversations.

- Yoon Hye-ri as Yoo-jin

A woman who speaks very plainly about her past. She is Chang-seok's editor.

- Moon Sook as Chang-seok's mother
- Jang Hae-min
- Kim Keum-soon
