= Salon de Holmes =

2025 South Korean television series

- Promotional poster
- Hangul: 살롱 드 홈즈
- RR: Sallong deu homjeu
- MR: Sallong tŭ homjŭ
- Genre: Action comedy
- Based on: Salon de Holmes by Jeon Gun-woo
- Written by: Kim Yeon-shin
- Directed by: Min Jin-ki; Jeong Hyeon-nam
- Starring: Lee Si-young; Jung Young-joo; Kim Da-som; Nam Gi-ae
- Country of origin: South Korea
- Original language: Korean
- No. of episodes: 10

Production
- Running time: 60 minutes
- Production companies: Artist Company; A2Z Entertainment; Neo Entertainment

Original release
- Network: ENA
- Release: June 16 – July 15, 2025

Salon de Holmes (Korean: 살롱 드 홈즈) is a 2025 South Korean television series, and starring Lee Si-young, Jung Young-joo, Kim Da-som and Nam Gi-ae. It aired on ENA from June 16, to July 15, 2025, and subsequently streaming on Genie TV every Monday and Tuesday at 22:00 (KST).

On July 16, 2025, production of the second season of the series was confirmed, and it is in preparation and planning and is scheduled to air in 2026.

== Synopsis ==
It is about four women from different backgrounds who come together to punish troublemakers in their compound.

== Cast ==
=== Main ===
- Lee Si-young as Kong Mi-ri
- Jung Young-joo as Chu Kyeong-ja
- Kim Da-som as Park So-hee
- Nam Gi-ae as Jeon Ji-hyun

=== Supporting ===
- Oh Dae-hwan as Noh Kang-sik
- Jung Sang-hoon as Park Seung-ho
- Lee Soo-ji as Park Soo-ji
- Si-hyeon as Noh Mi-nyeo
- Choi Yu-sol as Hee-soo
- Lee Hwa-gyeom as Yoon-joo
- Park Ji-a as Choi Seon-ja
- Kang Ji-woo as Park Hyun-ji
- Lee Jae-kyung as Kim Kwang-gyu

=== Special appearances ===
- Kim Joon-hyun as Oh Bok-tae (ep. 2)
- Moon Hee as Oh Bok-tae's girlfriend (ep. 2)
- Im Ji-kyu as Park Do-jin (ep. 6)

== Production ==
The series is written by Kim Eun-sun, who co-wrote the daily dramas The Promise (2016) and The Secret of My Love (2017). It is directed by Min Jin-gi, whose work includes the military comedy series New Recruit (2022–25), also co-directed by Jung Hyun-nam and produced by Artist Company, along with A2Z Entertainment and Neo Entertainment.

== Viewership ==
Salon de Holmes : South Korea viewers per episode (thousands)

Season	Episode number										Average
Season	1	2	3	4	5	6	7	8	9	10	Average
1	378	533	484	623	647	788	683	757	761	816	647

Source: Audience measurement performed nationwide by Nielsen Korea.

Average TV viewership ratings
Ep.	Original broadcast date	Average audience share	
Ep.	Original broadcast date	(Nielsen Korea)	
Ep.	Original broadcast date	Nationwide	Seoul
1	June 16, 2025	1.324% (4th)	1.152% (7th)
2	June 17, 2025	2.193% (3rd)	2.173% (2nd)
3	June 23, 2025	2.007% (2nd)	2.117% (2nd)
4	June 24, 2025	2.518% (2nd)	2.237% (2nd)
5	June 30, 2025	2.566% (2nd)	2.630% (2nd)
6	July 1, 2025	3.447% (2nd)	3.289% (2nd)
7	July 7, 2025	2.701% (2nd)	2.790% (2nd)
8	July 8, 2025	3.274% (2nd)	3.198% (2nd)
9	July 14, 2025	3.178% (2nd)	3.174% (2nd)
10	July 15, 2025	3.627% (2nd)	3.342% (2nd)
Average		2.684%	2.610%
In the table above, the blue numbers represent the lowest ratings and the red numbers represent the highest ratings.; This drama aired on a cable channel/pay TV which normally has a relatively smaller audience compared to free-to-air TV/public broadcasters (KBS, SBS, MBC, and EBS).
