= The Boys (2022 film) =

2022 South Korean film by Jung Ji-young

- Theatrical release poster
- Hangul: 소년들
- Hanja: 少年들
- RR: Sonyeondeul
- MR: Sonyŏndŭl
- Directed by: Chung Ji-young
- Written by: Jung Sang-hyeop
- Produced by: Jeong Sang-min
- Starring: Sul Kyung-gu; Yoo Jun-sang; Jin Kyung; Heo Sung-tae; Yeom Hye-ran
- Cinematography: Kim Hyung-suk
- Edited by: Kim Sang-bum
- Music by: Shin Min
- Production company: Aura Pictures
- Distributed by: CJ Entertainment
- Release dates: October 6, 2022 (BIFF); November 1, 2023 (South Korea)
- Running time: 124 minutes
- Country: South Korea
- Language: Korean
- Box office: US$3.4 million

The Boys (Korean: 소년들; RR: Sonyeondeul) is a 2022 South Korean crime drama film directed by Chung Ji-young and starring Sul Kyung-gu, Yoo Jun-sang, Jin Kyung, Heo Sung-tae and Yeom Hye-ran. It is based on the true story of the Samrye Nara Supermarket Trio Robbery Case that occurred in Wanju County.

The film premiered at the 27th Busan International Film Festival on October 6, 2022. It was theatrically released in South Korea on November 1, 2023.

== Plot ==
In 1999, a brutal robbery-murder takes place at a small supermarket in Samnye, Jeonbuk. The police quickly narrow down their suspects to three local boys, and overnight, they are falsely accused and thrown into prison without understanding why.

The following year, veteran detective Hwang Jun-cheol is newly assigned as the lead investigator. When he receives a tip about the real perpetrator, he reopens the case to clear the boys' names. However, his efforts are thwarted by Choi Woo-sung, the detective originally in charge of the case, and Hwang is ultimately demoted.

Sixteen years later, the case's only eyewitness, Yoon Mi-sook, and the now-grown boys reappear before Hwang, bringing the past back to the surface.

== Cast ==
- Sul Kyung-gu as Hwang Jun-cheol
- Yoo Jun-sang as Choi Woo-sung
- Jin Kyung as Yoon Mi-sook
- Heo Sung-tae as Park Jeong-gyu
- Yeom Hye-ran as Kim Kyung-mi
- Kim Dong-young as Kwon Chang-ho
  - Kim Si-woon as young Kwon Chang-ho
- Yoo Su-bin as Jeon Seung-woo
  - Jo Hyun-do as young Jeon Seung-woo
- Kim Kyung-ho as Seo Byeong-won
  - Kim Do-yeop as young Seo Byeong-won
- Seo In-guk as Lee Jae-seok
- Bae Yoo-ram as Jo Hyun-soo
- Park Hee-jin as Ha Joo-hyuk
- Han Soo-yeon as Attorney Shin Eun-hee
- Ha Do-kwon as Kim Min-jae
- Lee Ho-cheol as Jang Moon-do
- Lee Jung-hyun as Lee Soo-il
- Yoon Byung-hee as Detective Lee
- Park Chul-min as Chief of Investigations

== Production ==
On June 9, 2020, cast of the film was revealed. Sul Kyung-gu, Yoo Jun-sang, Jin Kyung, Heo Sung-tae and Yeom Hye-ran were cast in main roles.

== Release ==
The film premiered at 'Korean Cinema Today - Special Premiere' section of 27th Busan International Film Festival on October 6, 2022. It was also screened at the 52nd International Film Festival Rotterdam in February 2023.

The film opened the 2023 London East Asia Film Festival on October 18, 2023; before its release in South Korea on November 1.

=== Home media ===
The film was made available for streaming on IPTV (KT olleh TV, SK Btv, LG U+ TV), Home Choice, Google Play, Apple TV, TVING, WAVVE, Naver TV, and KT skylife from November 27, 2023.

== Reception ==
=== Box office ===
The film was released on November 1, 2023, on 1037 screens. It opened in 2nd place at the South Korean box office with 57,436 people viewing the film.

As of November 26, 2023, with gross of US$3,406,306 and 468,631 admissions, it is the 19th highest grossing South Korean film released in 2023.

=== Critical response ===
Jeong Jin-young writing in Daily Sports described the film as "the weight of a true story without being flashy". Jeong praised the performance of ensemble writing, "ensemble of talented actors, including Yeom Hye-ran, who works as a married couple with Sol Kyeong-gu, Heo Seong-tae, who walks a strange tightrope between good and evil add to the attraction." Kim Na-yeon writing in Star News opined, The Boys is a film with a great dilemma that resonates with a true story." Kim quoting director Jeong Ji-young felt that "after watching the movie, you will be able to look deeper into the inner workings of this incident."
