= Believer 2 =

2023 South Korean crime action film

- Promotional poster
- Hangul: 독전 2
- Lit.: Solo Battle
- RR: Dokjeon 2
- MR: Tokchŏn 2
- Directed by: Baek Jong-yul
- Screenplay by: Kim Hee-jin
- Produced by: Lim Seung-young
- Starring: Cho Jin-woong; Cha Seung-won; Han Hyo-joo; Oh Seung-hoon
- Cinematography: Kim Tae-kyung
- Edited by: Kim Sun-min
- Music by: Primary
- Production companies: CJ ENM Studios; Superfiction
- Distributed by: Netflix
- Release dates: October 5, 2023 (BIFF); November 17, 2023 (Netflix)
- Running time: 116 minutes
- Country: South Korea
- Language: Korean

Believer 2 (Korean: 독전 2) is a 2023 South Korean action crime film directed by Baek Jong-yul. It is a sequel to the 2018 film Believer and stars Cho Jin-woong, Cha Seung-won, Han Hyo-joo, Oh Seung-hoon, Kim Dong-young, and Lee Joo-young. The sequel follows Won-ho's investigation of looking for "Rak," who disappeared after Brian's incarceration, while getting to the core of the elusive drug cartel. It premiered at 28th Busan International Film Festival in 'Korean Cinema Today - Special Premiere' section on October 5, 2023. It is available for streaming on Netflix from November 17, 2023.

== Cast ==
=== Main ===
- Cho Jin-woong as Jo Won-ho

A persistent detective who has been tracking the true nature of a drug organization for a long time.

- Cha Seung-won as Brian Lee

A hidden figure in the organization. He impersonated as 'Mr. Lee' in the previous film.

- Han Hyo-joo as Big Knife/Seob So-Cheon

The closest associate of Mr. Lee and in charge of handling the organization's affairs.

- Oh Seung-hoon as Seo Young-rak

A member of the organization who helped Wonho with his investigation, but then disappeared. Previously played by Ryu Jun-yeol.

=== Supporting ===
- Seo Ha-jung as Eun-kwan

Brian Lee's personal bodyguard.

- Kim Dong-young as Manko

A deaf, mute drug cook and the brother of Rona.

- Lee Joo-young as Rona

A deaf, mute drug cook and the sister of Manko.

- Jung Joon-won as Kang Deok-cheon

A detective from Team 1 of the Narcotics Investigation Unit at the Seoul Eastern Police Station.

- Kang Seung-hyun as Kim So-yeon
- Jo Han-chul as Jay

A member of Mr. Lee's organization in Thailand.

- Lee Sang-hee as Deok-cheon's wife
- Yang Ik-june as Chief Woo

A person who pretends to be a union member of a factory employee who was already on standby at a local drug factory.

- Choi Kwang-il as Commissioner Song
- Tzi Ma as Mr. Lee

=== Special appearance ===
- Jeon Seok-ho as Executive officer
- Byun Yo-han as Jin Ha-rim

A Chinese-Korean drug lord. Previously played by Kim Joo-hyuk.

== Production ==
Netflix confirmed the production of Believer 2 a sequel to the 2018 crime action film Believer in June 2022. The film is directed by Baek Jong-yul and the cast includes the return of lead actors and actresses Cho Jin-woong and Cha Seung-won, Han Hyo-joo, Oh Seung-hoon, Kim Dong-young and Lee Joo-young. The film was wrapped up in November 2022 in Norway.

== Release ==
The film had its premiere at the 28th Busan International Film Festival in 'Korean Cinema Today - Special Premiere' section on October 5, 2023. It is available for streaming on Netflix from November 17, 2023, in selected regions.

== Reception ==
=== Critical response ===
James Marsh of South China Morning Post rated the film 1/5 and criticized the "excessive violence in a Korean action movie" and character of Han Hyo-joo writing, "preposterous new villain, Seob So-chen, aka Big Knife, a deadpan, chain-smoking angel of death who descends onto the scene from China sporting bad skin, even worse teeth, thick glasses and a penchant for decapitations." He concluded, "Even those who remain committed are in for two exhausting hours of relentlessly histrionic mayhem and misdirection that ultimately adds nothing but questions to its infinitely superior forerunner".

Lori Meek of Ready Steady Cut rated the film 3/5 and wrote, "Like its predecessor, the film offers plenty of gratuitous violence while adding layers and twists to its story."
