= Reawaken Man: The Red =

Upcoming film by Baek Jong-yul

- Theatrical release poster
- Hangul: 부활남: 더 레드
- Hanja: 復活男: 더 레드
- RR: Buhwallam: deo redeu
- MR: Puhwallam: tŏ redŭ
- Directed by: Baek Jong-yul
- Written by: Kang Sun-joo; Park Sung-shin
- Based on: Reawakened Man by: Chae Yong-taek; Kim Jae-han
- Produced by: Syd Lim
- Starring: Koo Kyo-hwan; Shin Seung-ho; Kang Ki-young; Kim Si-a; Kim Sung-ryung
- Cinematography: Jeon Seong-ho
- Edited by: Park So-ra
- Music by: Primary
- Production company: Yong Film
- Distributed by: Lotte Entertainment
- Release date: September 30, 2026
- Running time: 101 minutes
- Country: South Korea
- Language: Korean
- Box office: $2.5 million

Reawaken Man: The Red (Korean: 부활남: 더 레드) is a South Korean action fantasy film based on the webtoon Reawakened Man by Chae Yong-taek and Kim Jae-han. Written by Kang Sun-joo and Park Sung-shin and directed by Baek Jong-yul, the film centers on Seok Hwan (Koo Kyo-hwan), an unemployed man whose sole qualification is baseless self-confidence. When he learns he can come back to life 72 hours after death, he is pursued by an unknown entity. Distributed by Lotte Entertainment, it was released theatrically on September 30, 2026.

== Premise ==
Seok-hwan is a job seeker who repeatedly fails job interviews despite receiving support from his best friend, Young-ha, and his younger sister, Ye-rin. After returning home from another disastrous interview, he is attacked by a group of strangers and dies.

72 hours after his death, Seok-hwan unexpectedly awakens and discovers that he possesses the ability to resurrect after dying. Soon afterward, a mysterious individual known as Black becomes aware of Seok-hwan's existence and begins pursuing him. As Seok-hwan repeatedly dies and resurrects, he gradually develops greater physical abilities and becomes increasingly powerful.

== Cast ==
- Koo Kyo-hwan as Seok Hwan
- Shin Seung-ho as Black
- Kang Ki-young as Young-ha
- Kim Si-a as Ye-rin
- Kim Sung-ryung as Mi-ju

== Production ==
=== Development ===
In October 2017, Yong Film representative Lim Seung-yong attended the Webtoon Universe Super String Project and stated his intention to adapt YLAB's webtoon Reawakened Man into a movie for a planned 2020 theatrical release. In a 2019 interview, Lim Seung-yong stated that the script for the film was being written and that Baek Jong-yul would be the director.

The following year, Lim stated that the film adapted only one-third of the original webtoon, with the remainder expanded through new narratives. While the webtoon focuses on humans being resurrected, the film depicts a post-Homo sapiens species emerging and waging war.

In 2023, Giantstep signed a VFX production contract with CJ ENM Studios for the film, totaling ₩5.1 billion. The film was developed under the working title New Generation War: Reawakened Man. Produced by Yong Film, the production company behind The Handmaiden (2016), and The Beauty Inside (2015), the film is co-written by Kang Sun-joo and Park Sung-shin.

=== Casting ===
The main cast at the press conference. From left: Kang Ki-young, Shin Seung-ho, Kim Si-a, and Koo Kyo-hwan.

In April 2022, Koo Kyo-hwan was set to star as the title character, Seok Hwan, the Reawaken Man. In May 2023, Kang Ki-young and Shin Seung-ho were reportedly cast. The following month, it was officially confirmed that Koo Kyo-hwan, Shin Seung-ho, Kang Ki-young, Kim Si-a, and Kim Sung-ryung would star as the leads.

=== Filming ===
Principal photography began on May 7, 2023, and was concluded in November of the same year.
