= A Bona Fide Killer =

2026 South Korean television series

- Promotional poster
- Hangul: 유부녀 킬러
- Hanja: 有夫女 킬러
- Lit.: Married Woman Killer
- RR: Yubunyeo killeo
- MR: Yubunyŏ k'illŏ
- Genre: Slice-of-life; Action
- Based on: A Bona Fide Killer by: Yoon; Gum
- Written by: Kim Eun-hee
- Directed by: Yoon Jong-ho; Kim Ji-hoon
- Starring: Gong Hyo-jin; Jung Joon-won; Lee Sang-yi
- Music by: Park Sung-il
- Country of origin: South Korea
- Original language: Korean
- No. of episodes: 14

Production
- Executive producer: Lee Min-ji
- Producers: Jeong Gu-yeong; Park Ji-eun; Jeong Ji-min
- Production companies: Bon Factory; Baram Pictures; Studio PIM

Original release
- Network: MBC TV
- Release: July 31 – September 12, 2026

A Bona Fide Killer (Korean: 유부녀 킬러) is a 2026 South Korean slice-of-life action drama television series written by Kim Eun-hee and directed by Yoon Jong-ho and Kim Ji-hoon. Based on the Kakao Webtoon of the same name by Yoon and Gum, the series follows the complicated life of Yoo Bo-na (Gong Hyo-jin), a married assassin, and her husband Kwon Tae-seong (Jung Joon-won), who is desperate to uncover her secret life. It aired on MBC TV from July 31 to September 12, 2026, every Friday and Saturday at 21:50 (KST). It is also available for streaming on Rakuten Viki in selected regions.

== Synopsis ==
Yoo Bo-na is a housewife and mother who leads a secret life as "Kingfisher", a vigilante and professional sniper who targets criminals the law has failed to punish. The nickname refers to her method of watching from above and striking fast. After returning from a three-year maternity leave, Bo-na struggles to balance her career and family. For her, work-life balance means fulfilling her role as a Kingfisher while protecting her family's happiness, which leads her to conceal her "other side" from her husband.

Her husband, Kwon Tae-seong, was a reporter dedicated to Kingfisher coverage. While recognized for his balanced and in-depth reporting, he suddenly ceased all coverage of Kingfisher, raising questions among his colleagues. On the day his wife returns from three years of maternity leave, the supposedly retired Kingfisher reappears, forcing Tae-seong to confront a buried memory. When he resumes tracking Kingfisher, he is torn between his role as a reporter and his duties to his family.

== Cast and characters ==
=== Main ===
- Gong Hyo-jin as Yoo Bo-na
  - Gi So-you as young Bo-na

Manager of Sales Team 3 at Durumi Electronics. By day she is an office worker with a husband and four-year-old daughter; by night she works as "Kingfisher", a professional assassin targeting criminals who evaded legal punishment. She leads a double life between her family and secret missions that put her life at risk. With unwavering resolve and a strong sense of justice, she fights for innocent victims. Following a three-year maternity leave, she returns to work striving to balance her family and career.

- Jung Joon-won as Kwon Tae-seong
  - Kwon Eun-seong as young Tae-seong

Bo-na's husband and a social affairs reporter. He is a devoted family man and journalist who investigates injustice. After previously tracking Kingfisher, he gets closer to the mysterious killer. Caught between journalistic integrity and family responsibility, he grows more conflicted as he uncovers the truth.

- Lee Sang-yi as Lee Dong-jin

A detective in Major Crimes Unit 2 of the Nambu Police Department's Criminal Investigation Division. He is Tae-seong's only friend and has zero tolerance for injustice. Having endured a tragedy as a student, he understands the pain of victims more than anyone. A staunch believer that legal judgment outweighs vigilante justice, he hunts the elusive killer, Kingfisher.

=== Supporting ===
==== Durumi Electronics Sales Team 3 ====
- Sung Dong-il as Kim Bong-pal

The team leader and a master assassin skilled at faking "accidental deaths". Outwardly friendly and unassuming at work, he is calm and decisive under pressure, earning him a reputation as a reliable and influential leader in both public and private spheres.

- Seo Jeong-yeon as Bae Yoon-ok

Former Sales Team 3 manager who becomes a flower shop owner. A former professional assassin specializing in "sudden death". After retiring to pursue a life focused on beauty, she opened a flower shop in Bo-na's neighborhood. The first floor is the shop, the second floor her residence, and the basement serves as Bo-na's secret training ground. Divorced after her husband discovered her true identity, she becomes Bo-na's mentor and only confidante.

- Heo Jae-ho as Go Young-gap

A medical malpractice specialist.

- Kim Nam-hee as Bong Tae-min

A weapon specialist.

- Mu Jin-sung as Ki Young-do

An assistant manager and a genius hacker.

- Ha Yul-ri as Oh Hyun-nam / Oh Seung-ah
  - Do Young-seo as young Seung-ah

The new employee and a poisoning specialist who arrives with a secret agenda. It is later revealed that her real name was Oh Seung-ah. She and Bona had crossed paths on Christmas Day; she was nearly killed by her own father, but Bona killed him first. As the only person who had seen Kingfisher's face, she had been searching for Bona ever since.

- Kim Ga-hee as Yang Ye-sol

Deputy and administrative staff.

==== Nambu Police Station ====
- Choi Woo-sung as Beom Seong-hoon

A Criminal Investigation Division Violent Crimes Team 2 and Se-ah's friend.

==== Tae-seong's family ====
- Cha Mi-kyung as Ok Seon-ja

Tae-seong's mother and Bo-na's mother-in-law.

- Lee Eun-saem as Kwon Se-ah

Tae-seong's youngest sister and Bo-na's youngest sister-in-law.

- Lee Sun-hee as Kwon Sun-il

Tae-seong's eldest sister and Bo-na's first sister-in-law.

- Kim Yun-jeong as Kwon Du-ri

Tae-seong's second older sister and Bo-na's second sister-in-law.

- Hwang Bom-i as Kwon Yul

Bo-na and Tae-seong's daughter.

==== Not Today ====
- Han Chae-rin as Gu Hae-na

A new reporter and Tae-seong's junior.

- Choi Deok-moon as Na Guk-jin

A director.

==== Other ====
- Shin Hyun-soo as Seul-gi (Sergey)

A killer and former Russian mercenary who protects Bo-na.

== Production ==
=== Development ===
A Bona Fide Killer is based on the Kakao Webtoon of the same title by Yoon and Gum. The series is a slice-of-life action drama directed by Yoon Jong-ho, written by Kim Eun-hee, and co-produced by Bon Factory, Baram Pictures, and Studio PIM. It is set to portray the life of a killer concealed behind the facade of an ordinary working mother, depicting her struggle to balance family, career, and a dangerous secret mission.

=== Casting ===
In June 2025, Gong Hyo-jin and Jung Joon-won were confirmed by their respective agencies to be considering the lead roles of Yoo Bo-na and Kwon Tae-seong, respectively. By June 2026, Gong, Jung, Lee Sang-yi, and Sung Dong-il were confirmed to lead the series.

=== Filming ===
Principal photography began in December 2025.

== Release ==
In December 2025, MBC included A Bona Fide Killer in its 2026 drama programming slate. The series was confirmed to premiere on July 31, 2026, and will air every Friday and Saturday at 21:50 (KST). It is also available for streaming on Rakuten Viki.

== Viewership ==
A Bona Fide Killer : South Korea viewers per episode (millions)

| Season | Episode number | | | | | | | | | | | | | | Average |
| Season | 1 | 2 | 3 | 4 | 5 | 6 | 7 | 8 | 9 | 10 | 11 | 12 | 13 | 14 | Average |
|---|---|---|---|---|---|---|---|---|---|---|---|---|---|---|---|
| 1 | 1.395 | 1.603 | 1.660 | 1.832 | 1.955 | 1.965 | 1.890 | 1.717 | 1.704 | 1.925 | 1.675 | 1.853 | 1.910 | 2.006 | 1.792 |

Source: Audience measurement performed nationwide by Nielsen Korea.

Average TV viewership ratings
| Ep. | Original broadcast date | Average audience share (Nielsen Korea) | |
| Ep. | Original broadcast date | Nationwide | Seoul |
|---|---|---|---|
| 1 | July 31, 2026 | 7.4% (4th) | 6.8% (3rd) |
| 2 | August 1, 2026 | 8.0% (2nd) | 7.9% (2nd) |
| 3 | August 7, 2026 | 8.3% (2nd) | 8.3% (2nd) |
| 4 | August 8, 2026 | 9.4% (2nd) | 8.9% (2nd) |
| 5 | August 14, 2026 | 9.8% (1st) | 9.5% (1st) |
| 6 | August 15, 2026 | 10.2% (2nd) | 9.8% (2nd) |
| 7 | August 21, 2026 | 9.7% (2nd) | 9.8% (1st) |
| 8 | August 22, 2026 | 8.8% (2nd) | 8.1% (2nd) |
| 9 | August 28, 2026 | 9.0% (2nd) | 8.7% (2nd) |
| 10 | August 29, 2026 | 9.9% (2nd) | 9.7% (2nd) |
| 11 | September 4, 2026 | 8.6% (2nd) | 8.3% (2nd) |
| 12 | September 5, 2026 | 9.3% (2nd) | 9.2% (2nd) |
| 13 | September 11, 2026 | 9.6% (2nd) | 9.1% (1st) |
| 14 | September 12, 2026 | 10.7% (2nd) | 10.4% (2nd) |
| Average | | 9.2% | 8.9% |
In the table above, the blue numbers represent the lowest ratings and the red numbers represent the highest ratings.
