= Moon Sook (actress) =

South Korean actress (born 1954)

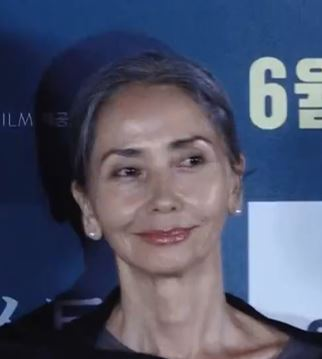
- Moon in 2018
- Born: Oh Kyung-sook; 19 May 1954 (age 72); Yangju, South Korea
- Other name: Audrey Hepburn of Korea
- Education: Dongmyeong Girls' High School
- Occupation: Actress
- Years active: 1973–present
- Agent: Management Pium
- Known for: Tunnel; Matrimonial Chaos; Kkondae Intern
- Spouse: Lee Man-hee (m. 1974; died 1975)
- Children: 2
- Relatives: Lee Hye-young (step-daughter)

Moon Sook is a South Korean actress. She is known for her roles in dramas such as Tunnel, The Uncanny Counter, Matrimonial Chaos, Kkondae Intern and Lovers of the Red Sky. She also appeared in the movies Keys to the Heart, Svaha: The Sixth Finger, Shades of the Heart and Emergency Declaration. She was a popular actress in the 1970s. In the 1970s, she was called the "Audrey Hepburn of Korea" due to her resemblance to the actress.

== Personal life ==
Moon married director Lee Man-hee in 1974 who was 23 years older than her and already married. The marriage did not last long due to Lee's death in 1975. Actress Lee Hye-young is her step-daughter. She later moved to America to study painting, where she met and married an American man with whom she has two children.

== Filmography ==
=== Television series ===
| Year | Title | Role | Ref. |
|---|---|---|---|
| 2016 | Memory | Hwang Tae-sun | |
| 2016 | Hello, My Twenties! | Belle Epoque landlady | |
| 2017 | Tunnel | Hong Hye-won | |
| 2018 | Life on Mars | Kim Mi-yeon | |
| 2018 | The Beauty Inside | Woo-jin's mother | |
| 2018 | Matrimonial Chaos | Go Mi-sook | |
| 2018 | Priest | Lee Hae-min | |
| 2018 | Just Dance | Hye-jin's grandmother | |
| 2019 | Graceful Family | Milk Witch | |
| 2019 | Gogo Song | Yoo Soon-nyeo | |
| 2020 | Touch | Yoon Young-hee | |
| 2020 | Kkondae Intern | Oh Kyung / Anastasia | |
| 2020 | SF8 | Jong-in's mother | |
| 2020 | The Uncanny Counter | Wi-gen | |
| 2021 | Lovers of the Red Sky | Samshin | |
| 2023 | Mask Girl | Sim Young-hee | |
| 2023 | Castaway Diva | Go San-hee | |
| 2023 | The Uncanny Counter 2: Counter Punch | Wi-gen | |
| 2023 | Revenant | Funeral attendee | |

=== Film ===
| Year | Title | Role | Ref. |
|---|---|---|---|
| 1975 | A Girl Who Looks Like the Sun (태양 닮은 소녀) | In-yeong | |
| 1975 | A Triangular Trap (삼각의 함정) | Ji-seok | |
| 1975 | The Road to Sampo (삼포가는 길) | Baek-hwa | |
| 1976 | Where Is Miss Yeong? (미스 영의 행방) | Nan-hyang | |
| 2015 | The Beauty Inside | Woo-jin's mother | |
| 2018 | Keys to the Heart | Bok-ja | |
| 2018 | Herstory | Seo Gwi-soon | |
| 2018 | Ode to the Goose | Gunsan restaurant owner | |
| 2019 | Svaha: The Sixth Finger | Myung-hee | |
| 2021 | Finding Angel (천사는 바이러스) | Ok-boon | |
| 2021 | Shades of the Heart | Chang-seok's mother | |
| 2022 | Emergency Declaration | Doctor Han | |
| 2022 | Hansan Redux | Admiral Yi Sun-sin's mother | |
| 2022 | Cafe Midnight: Missing Honey | Cafe's customer | |

== Awards and nominations ==
Name of the award ceremony, year presented, category, nominee of the award, and the result of the nomination
| Award ceremony | Year | Category | Nominee / Work | Result | Ref. |
|---|---|---|---|---|---|
| 11th Korean Theater and Film Awards | 1974 | Best Actress in Film | Moon Sook | Won | |
| Baeksang Arts Awards | 1975 | Best News Actress – Film | A Girl Who Looks Like the Sun | Won | |
