= The Last Ride (2016 film) =

- Film poster
- Hangul: 위대한 소원
- RR: Widaehan sowon
- MR: Widaehan sowŏn
- Directed by: Nam Dae-joong
- Written by: Nam Dae-joong
- Produced by: Kim Yong-sun
- Starring: Ryu Deok-hwan; Kim Dong-young; Ahn Jae-hong
- Cinematography: Na Seung-yong
- Release date: 21 April 2016
- Running time: 93 minutes
- Country: South Korea
- Language: Korean
- Box office: US$2,170,822

The Last Ride (Korean: 위대한 소원; RR: Widaehan sowon; lit. 'The Great Wish') is a 2016 South Korean comedy drama film written and directed by Nam Dae-joong and starring Ryu Deok-hwan, Kim Dong-young and Ahn Jae-hong.

== Plot ==
Go-Hwan's father wakes up every morning for exercise. Soon, it is revealed that he wants to participate in a marathon with his son, who is in a wheelchair. Go-Hwan is worried, but his father wraps him with thick blankets and ties him to the wheelchair. Before finishing the marathon, the father collapses due to exhaustion and accidentally pushes Go Hwan down the road. An ambulance takes the father away. The father tries to tell about his son, who fell face down the cliff. Later in the evening, the news reports about Go-Hwan, who is found by a driver.

Go-Hwan's best friends Nam-Joon and Gab-Duk are shocked upon hearing the news. They find Go-Hwan's mother in front of the hospital. She tells them to come visit her son before he dies. They want to leave happy memories to their friend, so they kidnap him from the hospital and together, riding on a motorbike, they visit the ocean only to find that the beach is contaminated with toxic waste. They also find two headed fish.

Go-Hwan's mother scolds the friends, as it makes his condition worsen. Go-Hwan has been suffering from Lou Gehrig's disease. He soon learns that this is the truth and when his best friends ask him what his wish is, Go-hwan tells them that he wants to have sex for the first and last time in his life. He keep yelling about it in the hospital, and when his mother comes to his room, they pretend nothing happened.

Nam-Joon and Gab-Duk try to find a girl for their dying friend, but they keep getting slapped or beaten upon speaking with the girls.

== Cast ==
- Ryu Deok-hwan as Go-hwan
- Kim Dong-young as Nam-joon
- Ahn Jae-hong as Gab-duk
- Jeon No-min as Go-hwan's father
- Jeon Mi-seon as Go-hwan's mother
- Bae Jung-hwa as goddess
- Han Kuk-jin as homeroom teacher
- Lee Han-wi as Gab-duk's father
- Lee Byeong-hun as good-for-nothing senior
