= Lee Joo-young (actress, born 1987) =

South Korean actress (born 1987)

- Born: April 24, 1987 (age 39); Busan, South Korea
- Other name: Lee Ju-young
- Occupation: Actress
- Years active: 2016–present
- Agent: Artist Company

Korean name
- Hangul: 이주영
- RR: I Juyeong
- MR: I Chuyŏng

Lee Joo-young (Korean: 이주영; born April 24, 1987) is a South Korean actress. She is best known for her role as Song Hye-ri in the tvN series Live.

== Filmography ==
=== Film ===
Year	Title	Role	Notes/Ref.
2016	Queen of Walking	Athletic club 1	
2018	Believer	Joo-yeong	
2018	Keys to the Heart	Eun-ha	
2018	I Have a Date with Spring	Park Mi-syeon	
2018	Miss Baek		
2019	Shades of the Heart	Joo-Eun	
2020	Samjin Company English Class	Song So-ra	
2021	Action Hero	Yeon-young/Seon-Ah	
2021	Good Day		Short Film
2021	Voice	Kang chil	
2022	I Disappeared	Jang Ha-da	
2023	Phantom	a ticket office worker	Cameo
2023	Don't Buy the Seller		Oh Dal-ja
2023	Believer 2	Joo-yeong	Netflix film
TBA	Taste of Horror – Rehabilitation		Short Film

=== Television series ===
Year	Title	Role	Ref.
2018	Live	Song Hye-ri	
2018	Just Dance	Park Hye-jin	
2020	The School Nurse Files	Han A-Reum	
2022	Money Game		
2024	The 8 Show	2nd Floor	
2025	Genie, Make a Wish	Min-ji	
2025	Surely Tomorrow	Park Se-young	

== Awards and nominations ==
Name of the award ceremony, year presented, category, nominee of the award, and the result of the nomination
Award ceremony	Year	Category	Nominee / Work	Result	Ref.
Asan Chungmugong International Action Film Festival	2022	Special Awards	Action Hero	Won	
Asia Model Awards	2021	Model Star Award	Samjin Company English Class	Won	
Baeksang Arts Awards	2019	Best New Actress – Film	Believer	Nominated	
Blue Dragon Film Awards	2018	Best Supporting Actress	Believer	Nominated	
Blue Dragon Series Awards	2024	Best Supporting Actress	The 8 Show	Nominated	
Buil Film Awards	2018	Best Supporting Actress	Believer	Nominated	
