= Portrait of a Family (2026 film) =

2026 film by Lee Ji-won

- Theatrical release poster
- Hangul: 비광
- RR: Bigwang
- MR: Pigwang
- Directed by: Lee Ji-won
- Written by: Lee Ji-won
- Produced by: Lee Jun-woo; Park Jong-seok
- Starring: Ryu Seung-ryong; Ha Ji-won; Kim Si-a; Kim Hae-sook; Kim Sun-young; Kim Young-min
- Cinematography: Jo Sang-yoon
- Music by: Hong Dae-seong
- Production companies: Ace Factory; Green Tree Pictures
- Distributed by: Content Zio; Playgram
- Release date: September 2, 2026
- Running time: 109 minutes
- Country: South Korea
- Language: Korean
- Box office: $664,022

Portrait of a Family (Korean: 비광) is a 2026 South Korean drama film written and directed by Lee Ji-won. The film stars Ryu Seung-ryong, Ha Ji-won, Kim Si-a, Kim Hae-sook, Kim Sun-young, and Kim Young-min. It was released in South Korea on September 2, 2026.

== Synopsis ==
Joong-goo, one of Korean baseball's biggest stars, and Nam-mi, a legendary actress, once lived the glamorous life of a top celebrity couple in the spotlight. But their marriage falls apart when Joong-goo's daughter, Dong-joo, suddenly appears in their lives. Unable to turn his back on Dong-joo, Joong-goo chooses to stay by her side, while Nam-mi is deeply wounded simply by the child's existence.

Eight years after the two have gone their separate ways, a female middle school student was found dead under a bridge. Dong-joo is identified as a prime suspect in the case, sending everyone into shock. As Dong-joo finds herself in an increasingly difficult situation, Joong-goo and his family do everything they can to help her. Meanwhile, Nam-mi discovers that the ill-fated connection from eight years ago has continued to haunt them to this day.

== Cast ==
- Ryu Seung-ryong as Hwang Joong-goo
- Ha Ji-won as Nam-mi
- Kim Si-a as Hwang Dong-joo
- Kim Hae-sook as Lee Gi-sik
- Kim Sun-young as Hwang Ji-sook
- Kim Young-min as Lee Seong-myung
- Yoo Jae-myung as Kwak Chang-gi
- Park Myung-hoon as Wang Byeon

== Production ==
=== Development ===
Director Lee Ji-won developed the film following her 2018 debut feature Miss Baek. She said the film was inspired by her interest in portraying people overcoming hardship together within a family.

=== Filming ===
The film was originally scheduled to begin filming in June 2020, but production was postponed for a year due to the COVID-19 pandemic, eventually commencing on June 23, 2021. Filming concluded on September 19 of the same year.

== Marketing ==
The film's promotional campaign began in July 2026 with the announcement of its September 2 release date and the release of a launching poster. The poster was designed to resemble the hwatu bi gwang card, with "bi" meaning "rain" and "gwang" meaning "light".

On August 24, character posters for the main cast were released, followed by additional character stills featuring Lee Hyun-kyun and Park Myung-hoon on August 31.

== Release ==
The distributor initially planned to release the film on July 27, 2022, but it was ultimately scheduled for a theatrical release in South Korea on September 2, 2026.
