= Heo Sung-tae =

South Korean actor (born 1977)

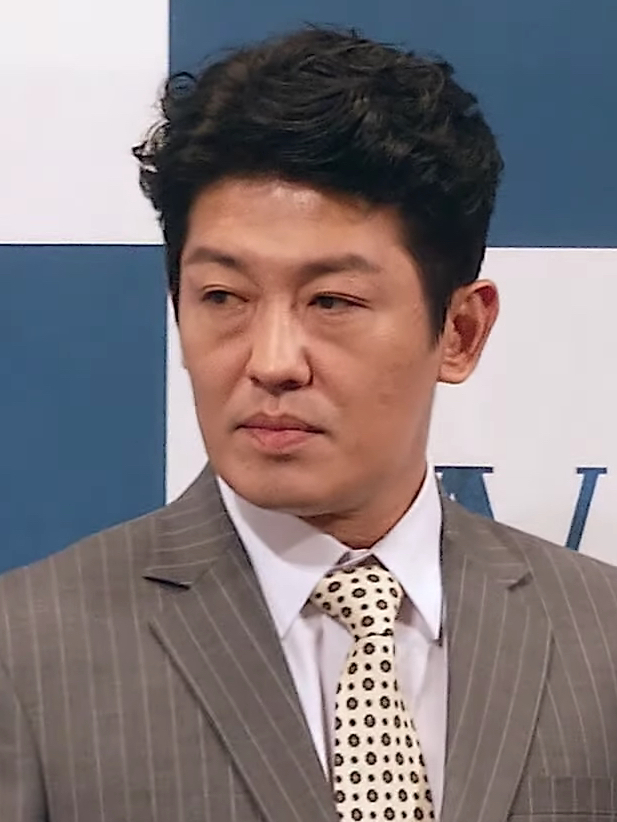
- Heo in 2019
- Born: October 20, 1977 (age 48); Busan, South Korea
- Education: Pusan National University
- Years active: 2011–present
- Agent: Billions
- Known for: The Age of Shadows; The Outlaws; Your Honor; Squid Game

Korean name
- Hangul: 허성태
- RR: Heo Seongtae
- MR: Hŏ Sŏngt'ae

Heo Sung-tae (Korean: 허성태, Korean pronunciation: [hʌ sʌŋ tɛ], born October 20, 1977) is a South Korean actor. He gained domestic prominence in the 2016 period thriller film The Age of Shadows and became recognized internationally for his role in the first season of Squid Game (2021). He has since starred in the television series Crash (2024) and Good Boy (2025).

== Early life and education ==
Heo was born in Busan, South Korea. He graduated from Pusan National University, where he majored in Russian. Prior to acting, he sold televisions in the Russian market for LG Corporation. He later joined the planning and coordination department of a shipbuilding company.

== Career ==
Heo began his acting career in 2011, when he entered SBS's talent show Miraculous Audition (기적의 오디션). According to Heo, he drunkenly signed up to audition after seeing a commercial for the show. He gained national prominence as Ha Il-soo in the 2016 period thriller film The Age of Shadows. For his role in The Fortress (2017), Heo had to learn the Manchu language. In the 2021 Netflix original series Squid Game, Heo starred as the gangster Jang Deok-su. In 2025, he starred in the action-comedy JTBC series Good Boy, alongside Park Bo-gum.

== Filmography ==
=== Film ===
List of film appearances, with year, title, and role shown
Year	Title	Role	Notes	Ref.
2012	Masquerade			
2014	Man on High Heels			
2014	Haemoo			
2014	The Royal Tailor	Officer Jong		
2016	The Age of Shadows	Ha Il-soo		
2017	The Fortress	Yong Gol-dae		
2017	The Outlaws	Viper		
2017	The Bros	Monk / Hyeong-bae		
2017	The Swindlers	Jang Du-chil		
2018	A Man's True Colors	Tae-hoon		
2018	Fengshui	Lee Si-young		
2018	Rampant	Lee Jung-rang		
2019	Mal-Mo-E: The Secret Mission	Ueda		
2019	The 12th Suspect	No Seok-hyun		
2019	The Divine Move 2: The Wrathful	"Busan Weeds"		
2019	Black Money	Prosecutor Choi		
2020	Hitman: Agent Jun	Hyung-do		
2020	Collectors	Viper gang leader		
2022	Stellar	Seo Sa-jang		
2022	Hunt	Jang Cheol-seong		
2022	The Boys	Detective Park	Premiere at BIFF	

=== Television ===
Key
†	Denotes television productions that have not yet been released

List of television series appearances, with year, title, and role shown
Year	Title	Role	Notes	Ref.
2014	Jeong Do-jeon	Nam Won-seong		
2014	Bride of the Century	Yi-hun's secretary	Cameo (episode 9)	
2017	Saimdang, Light's Diary	Wang Jung-chul	Cameo (episode 14)	
2017	Tunnel	Jung Ho-young		
2017	Queen for Seven Days	Shaman		
2017	Live Up to Your Name	Gangster	Cameo	
2017	Witch at Court	Baek Sang-ho		
2018	Cross	Kim Hyung-beom		
2018	Your Honor	Hong Jung-soo		
2018	Big Forest	Gil Kang	Cameo	
2019	Liver or Die	Condoler	Cameo (episode 1)	
2019	Different Dreams	Matsuura		
2019	Voice 3	Drug dealer	Cameo (episodes 2, 6)	
2019	Watcher	Jang Hae-ryong		
2019	Psychopath Diary	Jang Chil-sung		
2020	King Maker: The Change of Destiny	Astrologer	Cameo (episode 2)	
2021	Beyond Evil	Lee Chang-jin		
2021	Racket Boys	Coach Cheon	Cameo (episodes 10–12)	
2021	Squid Game	Jang Deok-su		
2021	The Silent Sea	Kim Jae-sun		
2022	Bloody Heart	Jo Won-pyo		
2022	Insider	Yoon Byung-wook		
2022	Adamas	Choi Tae-seong / Chief Choi		
2022	A Model Family	Ma Sa-jang	Special appearance	
2022	Behind Every Star	Goo Hae-joon	Cameo	
2022	Big Bet	Seo Tae-seok		
2023	Bait	Noh Sang-cheon		
2024	Crash	Jeong Chae-man		
2025	Good Boy	Ko Man-sik		
2026	Fifties Professionals	Kang Bum-ryong		
2026	Phantom Lawyer	Lee Kang-pung	Cameo	
2026	Our Sticky Love	Baek Sang-gil		

=== Web shows ===
List of web shows appearances, with year, title, and role shown
Year	Title	Role	Notes	Ref.
2022	Saturday Night Live Korea	Host	Season 2 – episode 6	

== Awards and nominations ==
Name of the award ceremony, year presented, category, nominee of the award, and the result of the nomination
Award ceremony	Year	Category	Nominee / Work	Result	Ref.
APAN Star Awards	2022	Best Supporting Actor	Squid Game & Insider	Won	
Asia Artist Awards	2021	Best Actor Award	Squid Game	Won	
Asia Model Awards	2021	Asia Special Award	Squid Game	Won	
Baeksang Arts Awards	2018	Best New Actor – Film	The Outlaws	Nominated	
Baeksang Arts Awards	2022	Best Supporting Actor – Television	Squid Game	Nominated	
Buil Film Awards	2022	Best Supporting Actor	Hunt	Nominated	
Director's Cut Awards	2022	Best New Actor in series	Squid Game	Nominated	
KBS Drama Awards	2022	Best Supporting Actor	Bloody Heart	Won	
Korea Culture Entertainment Awards	2021	Excellence Award for Male	Squid Game	Won	
SBS Drama Awards	2018	Best Supporting Actor	Your Honor	Nominated	
SBS Drama Awards	2021	Scene Stealer Award	Racket Boys	Nominated	
