= Cho Yi-hyun =

South Korean actress (born 1999)

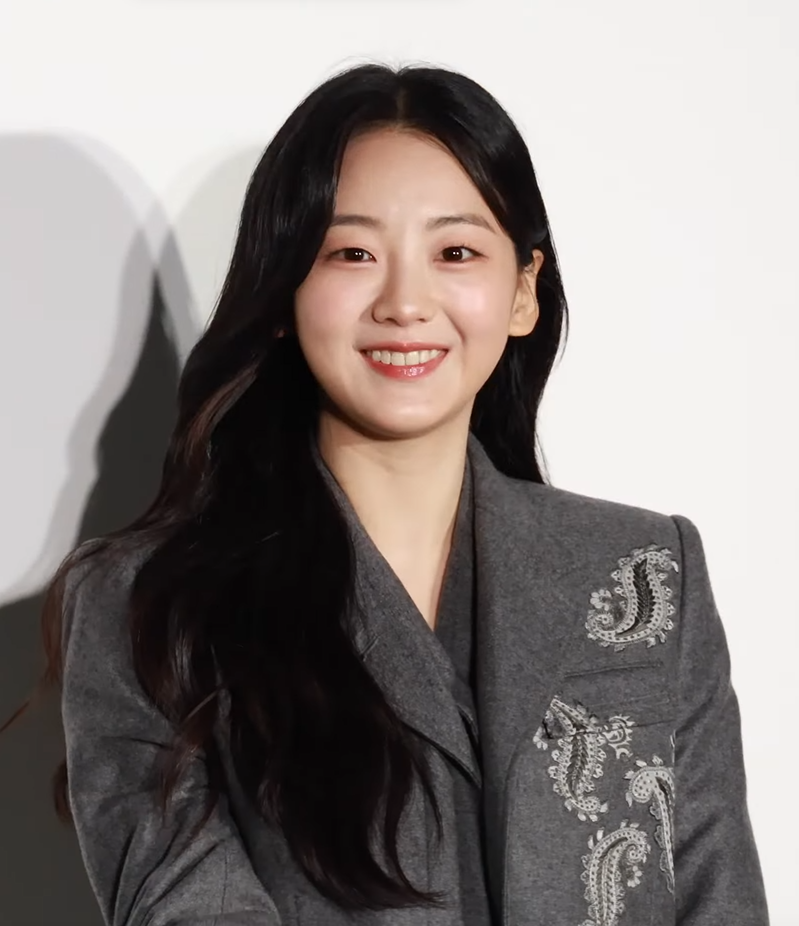
- Cho in October 2023
- Born: December 8, 1999 (age 26); Gwangmyeong, South Korea
- Education: Hanlim Multi Art School; Kyung Hee University
- Occupation: Actress
- Years active: 2017–present
- Agent: Artist Company

Korean name
- Hangul: 조이현
- RR: Jo Ihyeon
- MR: Cho Ihyŏn

Cho Yi-hyun (Korean: 조이현, born December 8, 1999) is a South Korean actress who made her acting debut in 2017. Her most notable portrayals include Hospital Playlist (2020–2021), All of Us Are Dead (2022), and Head Over Heels (2025).

== Career ==
Cho made her acting debut in 2017. She signed an exclusive contract with JYP Entertainment in 2018, but the following year, she moved to Artist Company.

== Endorsements ==
In June 2025, Cho and Tarzzan became Reebok's official ambassadors for its Vector 93 summer collection.

== Filmography ==
=== Film ===
Year	Title	Role	Notes	Ref.
2018	On My Way Home	Jo Yi-hyeon		
2019	Homme Fatale	Soo-yang		
2019	Metamorphosis	Park Hyeon-ju		
2022	Ditto	Mu-nee		
2023	Dr. Cheon and Lost Talisman	Mr. Park's daughter	Cameo	
2026	Final Interview	Moon Hye-in		

=== Television series ===
Year	Title	Role	Notes	Ref.
2017	Witch at Court	Hong Seon-hwa (young)		
2018	The Guest	Han Mi-jin (young)	Cameo, Ep. 7	
2018	Bad Papa	Kim Se-jung		
2018	Less Than Evil	Bae Yeo-wool		
2019	My Country: The New Age	Seo Yeon		
2020–2021	Hospital Playlist	Jang Yoon-bok	Season 1–2	
2020	How to Buy a Friend	Shin Seo-jeong		
2021–2022	School 2021	Jin Ji-won		
2022–present	All of Us Are Dead	Choi Nam-ra	Season 1–present	
2023	The Matchmakers	Jeong Soon-deok		
2025	Head over Heels	Park Seong-a		
2026	Summer Vacation	Kim Ha-yeon		

=== Web series ===
Year	Title	Role	Notes	Ref.
2017	Real Life Love Story: Season 3		Different role each episode	
2017	Sweet Revenge	Ye-ri		

=== Music video appearances ===
Year	Song title	Artist	Ref.
2018	"Quit" (뚝)	Jang Wooyoung	
2018	"After You" (그대 떠난 뒤)	Jo Hyun-ah (Urban Zakapa)	

=== Hosting ===
Year	Title	Notes	Ref.
2023	2023 KBS Entertainment Awards	with Shin Dong-yup and Joo Woo-jae	

== Accolades ==
=== Awards and nominations ===
Name of the award ceremony, year presented, category, nominee of the award, and the result of the nomination
Award ceremony	Year	Category	Nominee / Work	Result	Ref.
APAN Star Awards	2022	Best New Actress	School 2021; All of Us Are Dead	Nominated	
Baeksang Arts Awards	2022	Best New Actress – Television	All of Us Are Dead	Nominated	
Blue Dragon Series Awards	2022	Best New Actress	All of Us Are Dead	Nominated	
Brand Customer Loyalty Awards	2022	Best New Actress	Cho Yi-hyun	Won	
Brand of the Year Awards	2022	Best New Actress	Cho Yi-hyun	Won	
Chunsa Film Art Awards	2020	Best New Actress	Metamorphosis	Nominated	
Director's Cut Awards	2023	Best Actress in Television	All of Us Are Dead	Nominated	
KBS Drama Awards	2021	Best New Actress	School 2021	Nominated	
KBS Drama Awards	2021	Best Couple Award	Cho Yi-hyun with Kim Yo-han; School 2021	Won	

=== Listicles ===
Name of publisher, year listed, name of listicle, and placement
Publisher	Year	Listicle	Placement	Ref.
Forbes	2022	Korea Power Celebrity Rising Star	Placed	
