= Shin Seung-ho =

South Korean actor and model

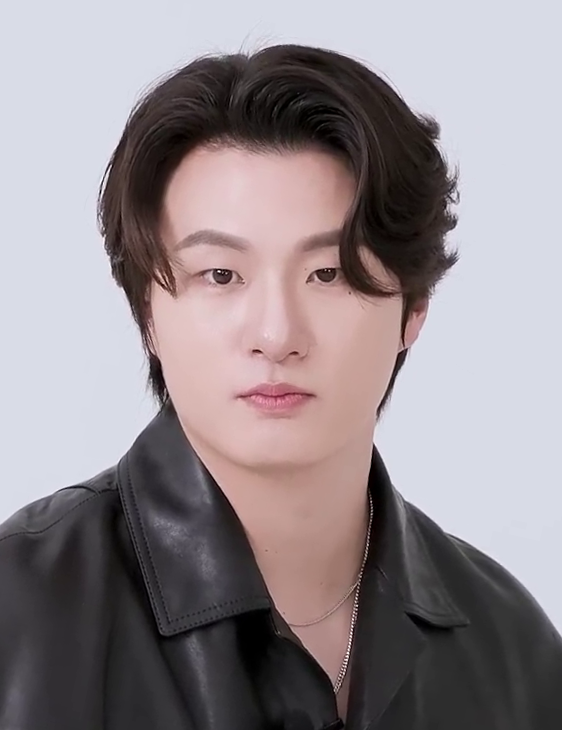
- Shin in 2025
- Born: 11 November 1995 (age 30); Seongnam, Gyeonggi-do, South Korea
- Occupation: Actor
- Years active: 2016–present
- Agent: King Kong by Starship

Korean name
- Hangul: 신승호
- RR: Sin Seungho
- MR: Sin Sŭngho

Shin Seung-ho (Korean: 신승호; born 11 November 1995) is a South Korean actor and model. As one of the leads, Shin received the most attention after appearing on A-Teen (2018). He is also known for appearing on Love Alarm (2019), D.P. (2021), and Alchemy of Souls (2022).

== Early life and education ==
Shin Seung-ho was born on 11 November 1995 in Seongnam, Gyeonggi-do, South Korea.

From around the age of 10, he played football. He quit in 2016 after a knee injury and the realization that soccer was no longer the path for him. Shortly after, he landed a part-time job as a security guard at a department store and was once assigned as Red Velvet's bodyguard during a fan signing event.

== Career ==
Shin began working as a model, walking in Seoul Fashion Week and Seoul 365 Fashion Show; he also reached the final stage of the SBS Supermodel Selection Contest. While working as a model, he got acquainted with model Park Dool-seon, who advised him to become an actor along with other acquaintances of his who believed he had a good tone of voice to be one: Shin was skeptical about it, thinking he was not fit to be a celebrity, but after a year of persuasion he was convinced to at least try attending an acting academy in Hyehwa-dong for a month at Park's expense. There he discovered his passion for acting and joined an agency through auditioning. He made his debut in the 2018 teen web series A-Teen, playing the male lead Nam Si-woo. This was followed by two more roles as a high school student in the teen dramas At Eighteen directed by Shim Na-yeon and Love Alarm (2019). In late 2020, he was cast in his first feature film, Baek Seung-hwan's Double Patty, for which he also recorded a soundtrack song.

He gained attention in 2021 for his portrayal of Hwang Jang-soo, a villainous sergeant who relentlessly bullies his juniors in the television series D.P., for which he was nominated for the Baeksang Arts Award for Best New Actor – Television. While filming D.P., he received an offer to play Go Won, a grumpy crown prince who hides a sweet side, in the historical fantasy Alchemy of Souls. The character, initially absent from the original script, was tailor-made for him by director Park Joon-hwa and the Hong sisters after meeting him, and Shin described it as the closest to his real-life personality. Also in 2022, he starred as the leader of a gang of thugs in Weak Hero, a teen action series based on the webtoon of the same name, in which he once again worked with D.P. director Han Jun-hee. Shin initially had to turn down the part because filming would have overlapped with Alchemy of Souls, but they eventually agreed to have him as a special appearance, and despite his short screentime, he received positive reviews for bringing a three-dimensional character to life. At the end of the year, he reprised his role as Go Won in the second season of Alchemy of Souls, and was cast in his second feature film, Pilot, in which he played Seo Hyun-seok, a junior airline pilot. In 2023, he signed contracts for two more films, the action movie Reawaken Man: The Red, based on a webtoon, and the mystery thriller Only God Knows Everything. The latter, released two years later, brought him awards as best actor at several international film festivals.

In 2024, Shin joined the cast of the film adaptation of Omniscient Reader's Viewpoint and the variety show Handsome Guys; he also started filming Audition 109, a remake of the 2009 film of the same name. Briefly branching out to music, he formed band Kongaltan through the eponymous YouTube show with fellow actors Shin Hyun-soo, Son Woo-hyeon, Han Min, and You Hyun-soo; they released a single, "Snow Duck", and held a two-day concert at Shinhan Card SOL Pay Square Live Hall in December 2024 with Shin Seung-ho serving as their leader and vocalist.

In 2025, he was cast in the television series Inside Men, set in the same universe as the 2015 hit film of the same name. He also landed a starring role in 6 Lying University Students, a mystery thriller adapted from the Japanese novel of the same name by Akinari Asakura.

== Other activities ==
In October 2025, the Ministry of Culture, Sports and Tourism and the Korea Creative Content Agency appointed Shin as the first official ambassador for the 2025 World Webtoon Festival.

== Personal life ==
Shin is of Protestant faith.

=== Military service ===
On June 18, 2025, Shin's agency, King Kong by Starship, confirmed to media outlets that he had ruptured a cruciate ligament during a personal engagement in 2021 and undergone surgery, and had been granted an exemption from mandatory military service later in 2021.

== Filmography ==
Key
†	Denotes films that have not yet been released

=== Film ===
Year	Title	Role	Ref.
2021	Double Patty	Kang Woo-ram	
2024	Pilot	Seo Hyun-seok	
2025	Omniscient Reader: The Prophecy	Lee Hyun-sung	
2025	Only God Knows Everything	Jung Do-woon	
2026	Audition 109	Jang-jae	
2026	Reawaken Man: The Red	Black	
2026	Final Interview	Baek Sung-bin	

=== Television series ===
Year	Title	Role	Notes	Ref.
2019	At Eighteen	Ma Hwi-young		
2020	How to Buy a Friend	Heo Don-hyuk		
2020	Homemade Love Story	Nam Si-woo	Cameo (episode 1)	
2022–2023	Alchemy of Souls	Prince Go Won		
2023	The Good Bad Mother	Civil servant	Cameo (episode 5)	
TBA	Inside Men †			

=== Television shows ===
Year	Title	Role	Notes	Ref.
2024–2025	Handsome Guys	Main cast		

=== Web series ===
Year	Title	Role	Notes	Ref.
2017	A Day for Romance			
2018	A-Teen	Nam Si-woo		
2019	A-Teen 2	Nam Si-woo		

=== Streaming television series ===
Year	Title	Role	Notes	Ref.
2019	Love Alarm	Il-sik	Season 1	
2021–2023	D.P.	Hwang Jang-soo	Season 1 – (Season 2; Cameo)	
2022	Weak Hero	Jeon Seok-dae	Season 1	

== Discography ==
=== Soundtrack appearances ===
Title	Year	Album
"The Night Sky"	2021	Double Patty OST

== Awards and nominations ==
Name of the award ceremony, year presented, category, nominee of the award, and the result of the nomination
Award ceremony	Year	Category	Nominee / Work	Result	Ref.
Baeksang Arts Awards	2022	Best New Actor – Television	D.P.	Nominated	
Brand Customer Loyalty Awards	2023	Male Rising Star Award	Alchemy of Souls	Won	
Cinematography & Photography Awards	2024	Best Actor (Short/Feature/Music Video)	Only God Knows Everything	Won	
Hollywood International Diversity Film Festival	2024	Best Actor	Only God Knows Everything	Won	
KBS Drama Awards	2020	Best Actor in a One-Act/Special/Short Drama	How to Buy a Friend	Nominated	
Korea First Brand Awards	2026	Hot Icon – Male	Shin Seung-ho	Won	
Kyoto Independent Film Festival	2025	Best Actor	Only God Knows Everything	Won	
Montreal Independent Film Festival	2025	Best Actor	Only God Knows Everything	Won	
