= Kim Si-a =

South Korean actress (born 2008)

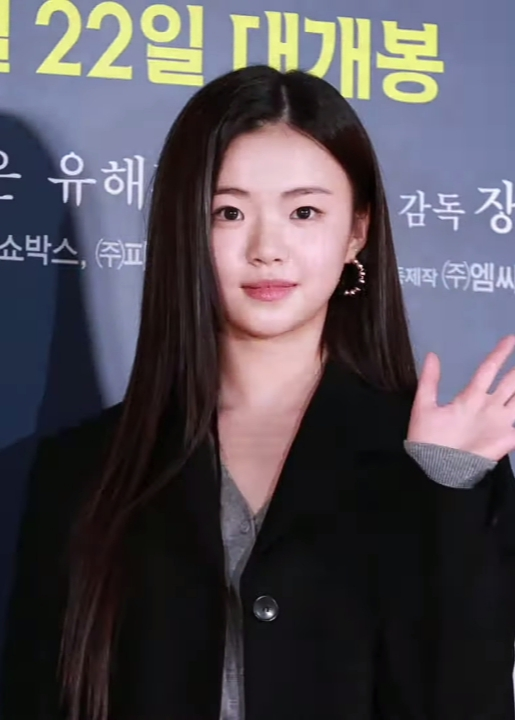
- Kim in February 2024
- Born: May 6, 2008 (age 18)
- Occupation: Actress
- Years active: 2018–present
- Agent: Varo Entertainment

Korean name
- Hangul: 김시아
- RR: Gim Sia
- MR: Kim Sia

Kim Si-a (Korean: 김시아; born May 6, 2008) is a South Korean actress. She had notable roles in Miss Baek (2018), Ashfall (2019), Kingdom: Ashin of the North (2021) The Silent Sea (2021) and Sweet Home (2023).

== Career ==
She signed an exclusive contract with Mystic Entertainment in 2019. In 2024, she parted ways with Mystic and signed an exclusive contract with BH Entertainment.

On June 18, 2026, Kim joined Varo Entertainment.

== Personal life ==
She has a younger sister, Kim Bo-min, who is a child actress.

== Filmography ==
=== Film ===
Key
†	Denotes films that have not yet been released

Year	Title	Role	Notes	Ref.
2018	Miss Baek	Kim Ji-eun		
2019	The House of Us	Yu-mi		
2019	Ashfall	Soon-ok		
2020	The Closet	Myung-jin		
2023	Kill Boksoon	Gil Jae-young		
2025	Summer's Camera	Summer		
2025	Good News	Interviewee	Cameo	
2026	Portrait of a Family	Hwang Dong-joo		
2026	Reawaken Man: The Red	Ye-rin		
TBA	Yeto	Mina		

=== Television ===
Key
†	Denotes television productions that have not yet been released

Year	Title	Role	Notes	Ref.
2019	Perfume	Min Jae-hee (young)		
2021	Kingdom: Ashin of the North	Ashin (young)		
2021	The Silent Sea	Luna		
2023	See You in My 19th Life	Yoon Joo-won		
2023–2024	Sweet Home	Seo Yi-su	Season 2–3	
2025	Walking on Thin Ice	Park Soo-ah		
2026	If Wishes Could Kill	Do Hye-ryung	Cameo (episode 1, 3, 6, 8)	

== Awards and nominations ==
Award ceremony	Year	Category	Nominee / Work	Result	Ref.
Blue Dragon Film Awards	2026	Best New Actress	Summer's Camera	Pending	
Golden Cinematography Awards	2019	Best Child Actor	Miss Baek	Won	
KBS Drama Awards	2025	Best Young Actress	Walking on Thin Ice	Won	
Sharm El Sheikh Asia Film Festival	2019	Best Actress Award	Miss Baek	Won	
