= Summer's Camera =

2025 romantic drama film by Divine Sung

- Theatrical release poster
- Hangul: 여름의 카메라
- RR: Yeoreumui kamera
- MR: Yŏrŭmŭi k'amera
- Directed by: Divine Sung
- Written by: Divine Sung
- Produced by: Joy Yu
- Starring: Kim Si-a; Kwak Min-gyu; Yu Ga-eun
- Cinematography: Lee Ji-min
- Edited by: Cheon Ji-hyeon
- Production company: A Divine Film
- Distributed by: Sidus Pictures
- Release dates: 24 March 2025 (BFI Flare); 24 June 2026 (South Korea)
- Running time: 82 minutes
- Country: South Korea
- Language: Korean

Summer's Camera (Korean: 여름의 카메라) is a 2025 South Korean coming-of-age romantic drama film directed and written by Divine Sung in her directorial debut. It stars Kim Si-a as Summer, a high school student who is coping with the loss of her father.

Summer's Camera had its world premiere at the BFI Flare: London LGBTIQ+ Film Festival on 24 March 2025. It is scheduled to be theatrically released in South Korea by Sidus Pictures on 24 June 2026.

== Premise ==
Summer is a high school student who lost her father a year earlier. She picks up one of his cameras to document her first year in high school and take photos of the school's soccer star, Yeon-woo, whom she has a crush on. When Summer develops the film roll in the camera, she discovers something about her father that he had kept hidden.

== Cast ==
- Kim Si-a as Summer
- Kwak Min-gyu as Maru
- Yu Ga-eun as Yeon-woo

== Release ==
Summer's Camera had its world premiere at the BFI Flare: London LGBTIQ+ Film Festival in the Hearts section on 24 March 2025. It had its North American premiere at the 2025 Seattle International Film Festival, competing for the Grand Prize on 21 May 2025. It screened at the 2025 QCinema International Film Festival at the RainbowQC section on 17 November 2025. It competed for the Golden Hanoman Award at the 20th Jogja-NETPAC Asian Film Festival.

== Accolades ==
Award / Film Festival	Date of ceremony	Category	Recipient(s)	Result	Ref.
Seattle International Film Festival	25 May 2025	Wavemaker Award: Best Futurewave Feature	Divine Sung	Won	
Jeonju International Film Festival	6 May 2025	Nongshim Shinramyun Award	Divine Sung	Won	
QCinema International Film Festival	20 November 2025	RainbowQC – Best LGBT Film	Divine Sung	Special Mention	
