= Kim Dong-young (actor) =

South Korean actor (born 1988)

- Born: 1988 (age 37–38); Seongdong, Seoul, South Korea
- Occupation: Actor
- Years active: 2004–present
- Agent(s): HODU&U Entertainment

Korean name
- Hangul: 김동영
- RR: Gim Dongyeong
- MR: Kim Tongyŏng

Kim Dong-young (born 1988) is a South Korean actor. He is known for his roles in both films and television series, notably Drinking Solo (2016), The Age of Shadows (2016), Room No.7 (2017), My Strange Hero (2018–2019), and River Where the Moon Rises (2021).

== Filmography ==
=== Film ===
Year	Title	Role	Notes/Ref.
1998	The Harmonium in My Memory		
2003	Dance with the Wind		
2004	Once Upon a Time in High School	Hyun-soo	
2004	Springtime		
2005	Bravo, My Life	Chul-ho	
2006	Lost in Love	rowing club student	
2006	Bewitching Attraction	Jong-doo	
2006	One Shining Day		
2006	Family Ties	regular customer 5	
2006	The City of Violence	Jang Pil-ho	
2006	Heart Is...	restaurant worker	
2011	Glove	Jo Jang-hyuk	
2011	Boy	Chang-geun	
2011	Punch	Hyeok-ju	
2014	A Hard Day	Do Hee-chul	
2014	Mad Sad Bad	Yang A-ri	
2016	Musudan	No Il-kwon	
2016	The Last Ride	Nam-joon	
2016	The Age of Shadows	Heol Joo-chul	
2016	Yongsoon	Bbak-gyu	
2017	Room No.7	Han-wook	
2017	The Battleship Island	gambler	
2018	Believer	Dong-young	
2019	Mal-Mo-E: The Secret Mission	Adult Deok-jin	
2019	Namsan, Poet Murder Incident		
2022	Boys		Premiere at BIFF
2023	Believer 2	Dong-young	Netflix film
TBA	Taste of Horror – Gold Teeth		Short Film

=== Television series ===
Year	Title	Role	Network	Ref.
2009	My Too Perfect Sons	Park Yong-chul	KBS2	
2011	The Thorn Birds	Park Han-soo	KBS2	
2016	Drinking Solo	Dong-young	tvN	
2017	Tunnel	Jeon Sung-sik	OCN	
2018	Return	Kim Dong-bae	SBS	
2018	Children of a Lesser God	Han Sang-goo	OCN	
2018	Let's Eat 3	Bae Byung-sam	tvN	
2018	My Strange Hero	Kyeong Hyeon	SBS	
2019	The Great Show	Ko Bong-joo	tvN	
2020	Soul Mechanic	Cha Dong-il	KBS	
2020	Train	Kim Jin-woo	OCN	
2020	Run On	Go Ye-joon	JTBC	
2021	River Where the Moon Rises	Sa Bong-gye	KBS2	
2021	The Penthouse: War in Life 2	Detective Cameo (Ep. 11–12)	SBS	
2021	Monthly Magazine Home	Cameo	JTBC	
2022	Jinxed at First	Chief Wang	KBS	

=== Web series ===
Year	Title	Role	Notes	Ref.
2023	Sweet Home	Jun-il	Season 2	
2025	S-Line	Oh Dong-sik	Supporting	
