= Miss Baek =

- Theatrical release poster
- Hangul: 미쓰백
- RR: Misseu Baek
- MR: Missŭ Paek
- Directed by: Lee Ji-won
- Written by: Lee Ji-won
- Produced by: Kang Ga-mi
- Starring: Han Ji-min; Kim Si-a; Lee Hee-joon
- Cinematography: Kang Guk-hyun
- Edited by: Han Young-gyu; Heo Sun-mi
- Music by: Mowg
- Production company: Bae Pictures
- Distributed by: Little Big Pictures
- Release date: October 11, 2018
- Running time: 98 minutes
- Country: South Korea
- Language: Korean
- Box office: US$5.4 million

Miss Baek (Korean: 미쓰백) is a 2018 South Korean drama film written and directed by Lee Ji-won, starring Han Ji-min, Kim Si-a, and Lee Hee-joon. The film was released in South Korea on October 11, 2018.

== Plot ==
Baek Sang-ah, who became a convict at a young age while trying to protect herself, has lived a lonely life, trusting no one and holding onto nothing. One day, she encounters Ji-eun, a frail and underdressed child desperately trying to escape a harsh reality. Seeing something of herself in Ji-eun, Sang-ah finds herself unable to turn away. Determined to save Ji-eun, she decides to stand against the world.

== Cast ==
- Han Ji-min as Baek Sang-ah
  - Kim Bo-min as young Sang-ah
- Kim Si-a as Kim Ji-eun
- Lee Hee-joon as Jang-Sup
- Kwon So-hyun as Joo Mi-kyung
- Baek Soo-jang as Kim Il-kon
- Kim Sun-young as Jang Hoo-nam
- Jeon Seok-ho as Detective Bae
- Lee Joo-young as Yoo Jang-mi
- Lee Jung-eun as a Message parlor owner
- Jo Min-joon as Detective Kang
- Yoon Song-ah a Social Worker
- Kim Joon-bum as Lecturer Jo
- Jung Kyung-ho as a Police chief
- Kim Ho-chang as a man police officer
- Yoo Jung-rae as a woman police officer
- Shin Soo-jung as Nurse Shin
- Kim Ji-hye as Nurse Kim
- Hong Sung-ho as Lecturer Ma
- Park Ki-sun as a grandfather in Car Center
- Han Yong-hwan as a Courier
- Kim Ji-hee as a neighborhood woman
- Sung Hyun-mi as a Super Auntie
- Keum Dong-hyun as a Super Uncle
- Kim Dae-in as the former male student
- Kim Min-ki as a man
- Jang Young-nam as Jung Myung-sook

== Release ==
The film was released on October 11, 2018, with an age 15-rating, for some violence and language.

The film was selected to screen at the 31st Tokyo International Film Festival and at the Stories of Woman program of the 3rd London East Asia Film Festival in London on October 25, 2018.

== Reception ==
On its opening day, the film grossed US$154,667 from 21,891 attendance and finished in third place. The film finished in third place during its debut weekend, grossed US$1.3 million from 161,468 attendance, tailing Dark Figure of Crime and Venom. During its second weekend, the film fell to fourth place with US$1.1 million gross, though dropping just 11% in gross compared to its debut weekend. On November 3, the film surpassed its break-even point at 700.000 attendance.

As of November 18, 2018, the film grossed US$5.4 million from 721,183 total attendance.

== Awards and nominations ==
Awards	Category	Recipient	Result	Ref.
38th Korean Association of Film Critics Awards	Best Actress	Han Ji-min	Won	
38th Korean Association of Film Critics Awards	Best Supporting Actress	Kwon So-hyun	Won	
38th Korean Association of Film Critics Awards	Top 11 Films	Miss Baek	Won	
3rd London East Asia Film Festival	Best Actress	Han Ji-min	Won	
39th Blue Dragon Film Awards	Best Actress	Han Ji-min	Won	
39th Blue Dragon Film Awards	Best Supporting Actress	Kwon So-hyun	Nominated	
39th Blue Dragon Film Awards	Best New Director	Lee Ji-won	Nominated	
5th Korean Film Producers Association Awards	Best Actress	Han Ji-min	Won	
10th KOFRA Film Awards	Best Actress	Han Ji-min	Won	
Cine 21 Awards	Best Actress	Han Ji-min	Won	
19th Women in Film Korea Festival	Best Actress	Han Ji-min	Won	
13th Asian Film Awards	Best Actress	Han Ji-min	Nominated	
55th Baeksang Arts Awards	Best Film	Miss Baek	Nominated	
55th Baeksang Arts Awards	Best Actress	Han Ji-min	Won	
55th Baeksang Arts Awards	Best Supporting Actress	Kwon So-hyun	Won	
55th Baeksang Arts Awards	Best Screenplay	Lee Ji-won	Nominated	
55th Baeksang Arts Awards	Best New Director	Lee Ji-won	Won	
3rd Sharm El Sheikh Asian Film Festival	Best Actress	Kim Si-a	Won	
24th Chunsa Film Art Awards	Best Actress	Han Ji-min	Nominated	
24th Chunsa Film Art Awards	Best Supporting Actress	Kwon So-hyun	Nominated	
24th Chunsa Film Art Awards	Best New Director	Lee Ji-won	Nominated	
28th Buil Film Awards	Best Actress	Han Ji-min	Nominated	
28th Buil Film Awards	Best Supporting Actress	Kwon So-hyun	Nominated	
28th Buil Film Awards	Best New Director	Lee Ji-won	Nominated	
21st Asian Film Critics Association Awards	Best Actress	Han Ji-min	Nominated	
56th Grand Bell Awards	Best Actress	Han Ji-min	Nominated	
