= Jung Young-joo =

South Korean actress (born 1971)

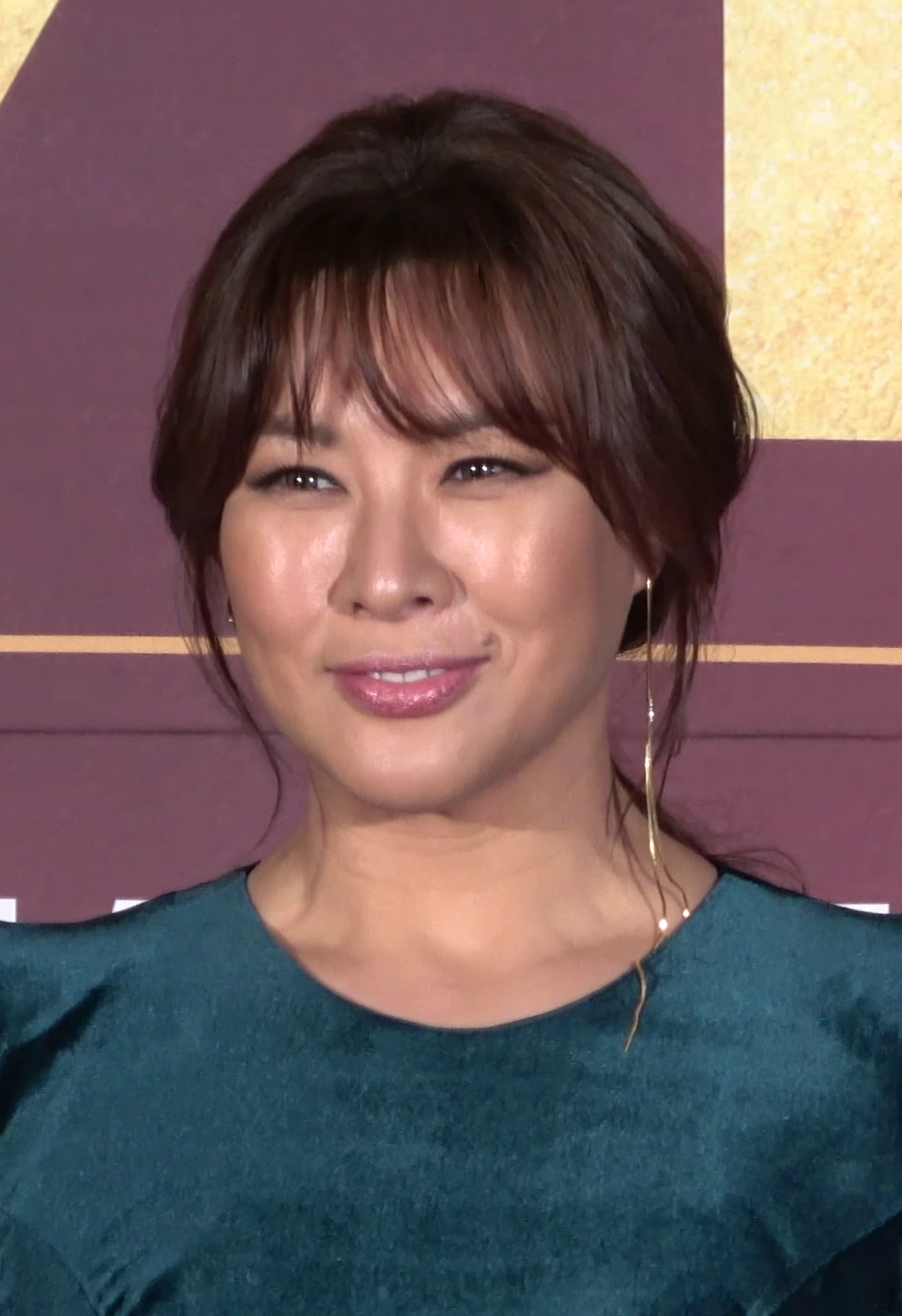
- Jung in 2019
- Born: May 23, 1971 (age 55); South Korea
- Education: Seoul Institute of the Arts
- Occupation: Actress
- Years active: 1994–present
- Agent: Big Title

Jung Young-joo (Korean: 정영주, born May 23, 1971) is a South Korean actress. A graduate of the Seoul Institute of the Arts, she made her debut in 1994. Known for playing strong, dominant female characters, she has acted in television, film, and on the stage. She currently serves as a media acting lecturer at Konkuk University.

== Discography ==
=== Soundtrack appearances ===
List of soundtrack appearances, showing year released and album name
Title	Year	Album
"Pretty Hero"	2024	Salon de Holmes OST Part 1

== Filmography ==
=== Film ===
Year	Title	Role	Notes	Ref.
1994	Grandma Cop (할매캅)			
2018	Happy Together	Aunt Fan		
2019	Like the First Drink	Mother		
2021	The Cursed Wife's Bongo	Lee Young-hee		
2021	Double Patty	Moon Hee-jung	Special appearance	
2022	Hot Blood	Mrs. Yoon	Special appearance	
2022	The Ghost	Kim Teacher’s Wife		
2022	Midnight Cafe: Missing Honey	Sun-hwa		
2023	Asura: War of the Tigers	Hwang Shi-mi		
2023	Road to Boston	Ok-rin’s Mother	Special appearance	
2023	Queen of Scams	Mi-ja		
2023	Five Rooms	Ballet Academy Vice Principal		
2024	Utopia	Mrs. Bok		
2024	Unknown Story (모르는 이야기)	Dentist		
2024	Wicked	Madame Morrible (voice)	Korean dub	
2025	Project Y	Bull		
2025	Wicked: For Good	Madame Morrible (voice)	Korean dub	

=== Television ===
Year	Title	Role	Notes	Ref.
2015	Sense8	Prison Guard		
2016	Signal	Bar Owner		
2016	Cinderella with Four Knights	Aunt at Raft Bridge		
2016	Second to Last Love	Writer Hwang		
2017	Sister is Alive	Fortune Teller	Special appearance	
2017	Radiant Office	Choi Fairy		
2017	Sweet Revenge	Joo Gil-lian		
2017	Jugglers	Park Hyung-ja		
2018	Evergreen	Hye-sook		
2018	My Mister	Jo Ae-ryeon		
2018	Tale of Fairy	Chief Fairy		
2018	The Undateables	Oh Doo-ri		
2018	If It's Her	Ms. Hwang		
2018	My Secret Terrius	Nanny Aunt		
2018	Witch's Love	Ms. Song		
2019	The Fiery Priest	Jung Dong-ja		
2019	He Is Psychometric	Lee Hwa-gyeong	Special appearance	
2019	Pegasus Market	Rogue Customer	Special appearance	
2019	The Golden Garden	Shin Ran-sook		
2019	At Eighteen	Park Geum-ja		
2020	Kkondae Intern	Eun Hye-soo	Special appearance	
2021	Vincenzo	Lawyer	Special appearance	
2021	Move to Heaven	Oh Mi-ran		
2021	Engine On From Today	Emma		
2021	The Penthouse: War in Life	Wang Ja	Special appearance	
2021	High-class	Mackenzie Chen		
2021	Moonshine	Tea Lady		
2022	Rookie Cops	Lee Hee-sook		
2022	Business Proposal	Han Wi-moo		
2022	From Now On, Showtime!	Yoon Min-sook		
2022	My Liberation Notes	Bar Customer	Special appearance	
2022	KBS Drama Special – The Devil in the Lake	Kim Teacher’s Wife		
2022	Connect	Gae Young-ran	Special appearance	
2023	Han River Police	Mrs. Choi	Special appearance	
2023	The Season of Puppets	Patient’s Relative		
2023	A Good Day to Be a Dog	Shin Mi-sun		
2024	Lovely Runner	Park Bok-soon		
2024	Miss Night and Day	Lim Cheong		
2024	The Good Saleswoman	Heo Young-ja		
2024	Good Partner	Go Ryu-soon	Special appearance	
2024	Tarot: Seven Stories – Couple Manager	Cheon Myung-joo		
2025	When the Stars Gossip	Jung Na-mi		
2025	Salon de Holmes	Chu Kyung-ja		
2025	Villains	Kkang Soon-ae		
2026	My Royal Nemesis	Cha Ju-ran		
2026	The Remarried Empress	Albani		

== Musical productions ==
Title	Years	Role	Location	Notes
Hell's Kitchen	2026	Miss Liza Jane	GS Art Center (Gangnam District, Seoul)	Written by Kristoffer Diaz, Directed by Michael Greif, Music by Alicia Keys
