= Final Interview =

2026 film by Kim Jung-hoon

- Theatrical release poster
- Hangul: 최종면접
- RR: Choejong myeonjeop
- MR: Ch'oejong myŏnjŏp
- Directed by: Kim Jung-hoon
- Screenplay by: Kwon Oh-kwang
- Based on: Six Lying College Students by Akinari Asakura
- Starring: Cho Yi-hyun; Kim Jae-won; Shin Seung-ho; Kang You-seok; Kwak Dong-yeon; Bae Gang-hee
- Cinematography: Jung Gwi-Ho
- Edited by: Park Joo-young
- Music by: Chung Joong-han
- Production company: Covenant Pictures
- Distributed by: Next Entertainment World
- Release dates: October 7, 2026 (BIFF); November 4, 2026 (South Korea)
- Running time: 106 minutes
- Country: South Korea
- Language: Korean

Final Interview (Korean: 최종 면접 ( 最終 面接 )) is a 2026 South Korean mystery thriller film based on the Japanese novel Six Lying College Students by Akinari Asakura. Directed by Kim Jung-hoon, it stars Cho Yi-hyun, Kim Jae-won, Shin Seung-ho, Kang You-seok, Kwak Dong-yeon, and Bae Gang-hee as the six applicants in the final interview at a global IT firm, forced to debate as a team for just one spot. Distributed by Next Entertainment World, it was released theatrically on November 4, 2026.

== Synopsis ==
Final Interview tells the story of six applicants gathered at a final interview venue who discover mysterious envelopes containing their respective revelations, causing them to suspect one another and throw them into confusion. Only six applicants advanced to the final interview from a 5,000:1 competition ratio. Within a two-hour time limit, they must select one candidate through five rounds of public voting.

== Cast ==
- Cho Yi-hyun as Moon Hye-in
- Kim Jae-won as Han Jin-woo
- Shin Seung-ho as Baek Seung-bin
- Kang You-seok as Lee Hee-chan
- Kwak Dong-yeon as Jeon Yo-han
- Bae Gang-hee as Cha Ju-won

== Production ==
Produced by Covenant Pictures and directed by Kim Jung-hoon, the film is a mystery thriller adapted from the novel Six Lying College Students by Akinari Asakura.

In October 2025, Kwak Dong-yeon, Shin Seung-ho, Kang You-seok, and Cho Yi-hyun were confirmed to star.

In January 2026, Kim Jae-won joined the cast. Four months later, it was confirmed that Bae Gang-hee would star, and filming had already been completed.

== Release ==
Final Interview had its world premiere at the 31st Busan International Film Festival in October 2026 as part of the 'Korean Cinema Today - Panorama' section. It was released theatrically on November 4, 2026 by Next Entertainment World.
