= Audition 109 =

2025 South Korean drama film

- Theatrical release poster
- Hangul: 짱구
- RR: Jjanggu
- MR: Tchanggu
- Directed by: Jung Woo; Oh Seong-ho
- Written by: Jung Woo
- Produced by: Park Sang-ik; Kang Myung-chan; Jung Woo
- Starring: Jung Woo; Jung Soo-jung; Shin Seung-ho; Hyun Bong-sik; Jo Beom-gyu; Kwon So-hyun
- Production companies: Pan Entertainment; Perfect Storm
- Distributed by: By4M Studio
- Release dates: September 19, 2025 (Busan); April 22, 2026 (South Korea)
- Running time: 95 minutes
- Country: South Korea
- Language: Korean
- Box office: US$3 million

Audition 109 (Korean: 짱구) is a 2025 South Korean comedy drama film directed by Jung Woo and Oh Seong-ho, starring Jung in his directional debut alongside Jung Soo-jung, Shin Seung-ho, Hyun Bong-sik, Jo Beom-gyu, and Kwon So-hyun. Jung Woo returns as the character from Wish (2009). The film follows Jjang-goo, who sets out to Seoul to study with dreams of becoming an actor. It had its world premiere at the 30th Busan International Film Festival on September 19, 2025. Distributed by By4M Studio, it was released theatrically on April 22, 2026.

== Synopsis ==
Jjang-goo, a Busan native, moves to Seoul to live on his own in pursuit of becoming an actor. But life in the city is harsh, so much so that he can barely afford his electricity bill, and nothing seems to go his way. His lines get tangled, his Seoul dialect trips him up even more, and his love life falters amid push-and-pull games. Still, Jjang-goo brushes himself off whenever he falls, and laughs even louder when he feels embarrassed. When life does not go as planned, this is one way to endure.

== Cast ==
- Jung Woo as Jjang-goo
- Jung Soo-jung as Min-hee
- Shin Seung-ho as Jang-jae
- Hyun Bong-sik
- Jo Beom-gyu as Kangnae
- Kwon So-hyun as Soo-young

== Production ==
In December 2024, it was confirmed that actor Jung Woo would make his directorial debut by co-directing the film Audition 109 alongside Oh Seong-ho, based on his own screenplay. Produced by Pan Entertainment and Perfect Storm, the film would also feature Jung in a leading role.

Principal photography began on December 29, 2024.

== Release ==
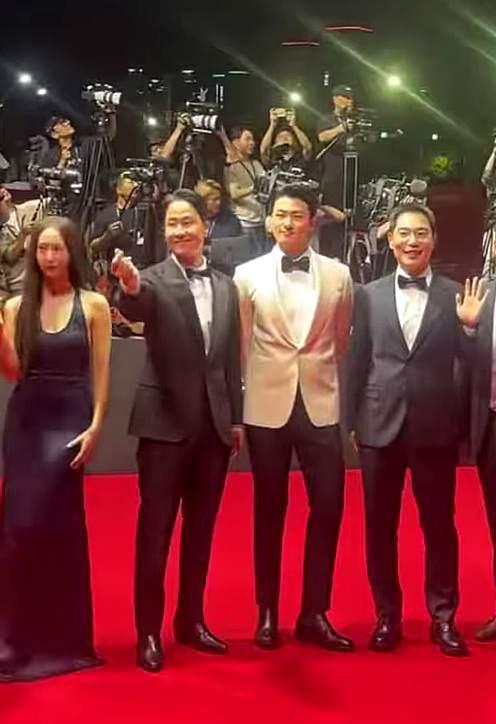
The director and cast at the 30th Busan International Film Festival, 17 September 2025. L-R: Jung Soo-jung, Jung Woo, Shin Seung-ho and Oh Seong-ho.

Audition 109 had its world premiere in the 'Korean Cinema Today - Special Premiere' section at the 30th Busan International Film Festival on September 19, 2025. It was released in theaters on April 22, 2026.

== Reception ==
=== Box office ===
The film was released on 878 screens.

As of August 23, 2026, the film has grossed US$2,899,985 from 411,178 admissions.

=== Critical response ===
Park Jin-young from Joy News 24 deemed the film "anachronistic" and "unpleasant in the way it portrays female characters", criticizing the scene where Shin Seung-ho's character evaluates women only by their appearance and finding that Min-hee was only used as a tool to highlight Jjang-goo's innocence.
