= Jung Joon-won (actor, born 1988) =

South Korean actor

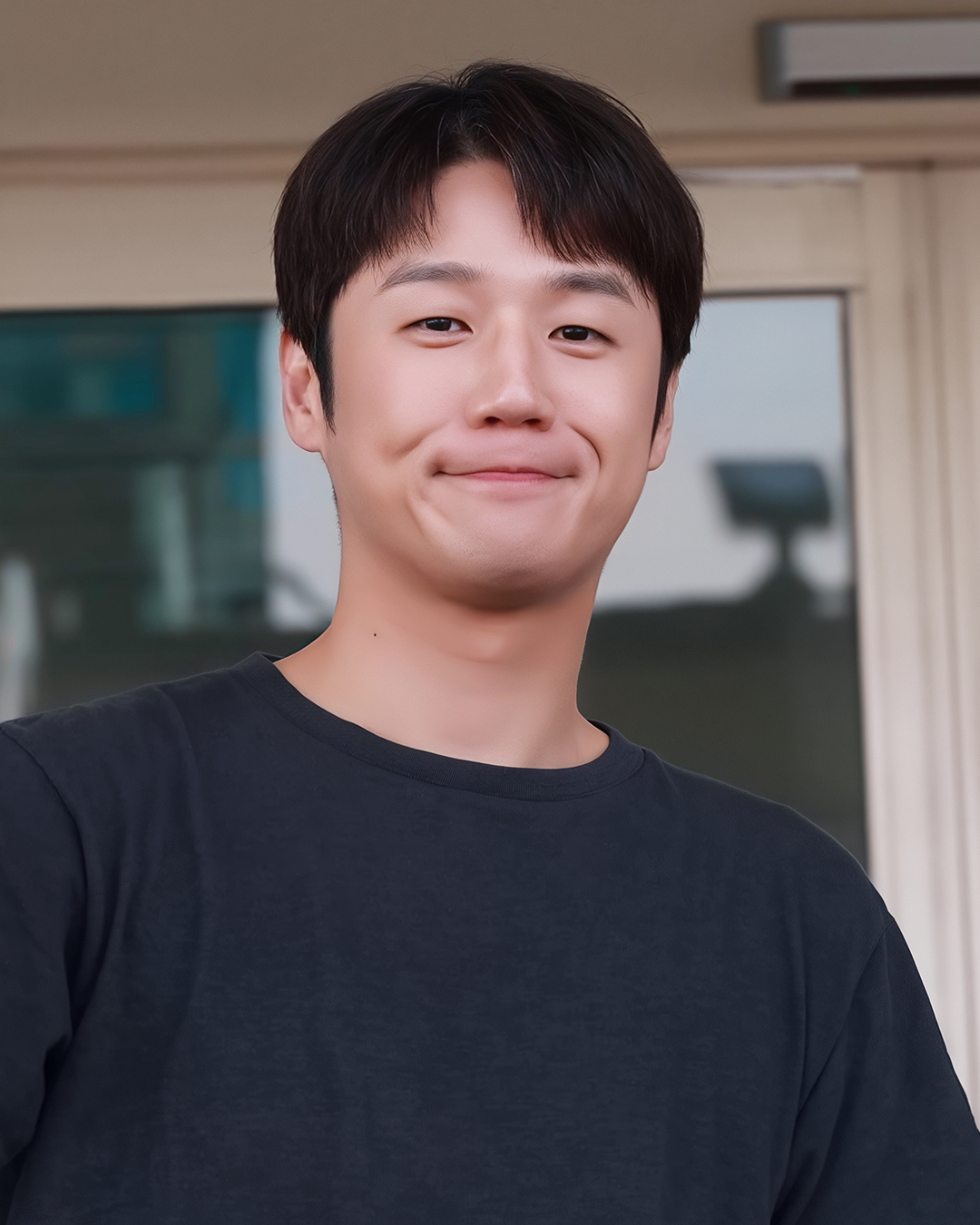
- Jung in 2025
- Born: 13 January 1988 (age 38); South Korea
- Education: Seoul Institute of the Arts
- Occupation: Actor

Korean name
- Hangul: 정준원
- RR: Jeong Junwon
- MR: Chŏng Chunwŏn

Jung Joon-won (born January 13, 1988) is a South Korean actor. He is known for his role in the television series Resident Playbook.

== Filmography ==
=== Film ===
Year	Title	Role	Notes
2015	The Avian Kind	Stranger	
2016	Like a French Film	Poet	
2016	Dongju: The Portrait of a Poet	Joseon student	Bit part
2017	Chae's Movie Theater	Choi-goon	
2017	Anarchist from Colony	Kim Joong-han	
2017	The Table	Chang-seok	
2018	Little Forest	Hoon-yi	Cameo
2018	Unknown Woman	Hyun-oh	Short film
2018	Believer	Deok-cheon	
2019	Say Goodbye in Hakodate	Hyun-oh	Short film
2019	My First Client	Geon-woo	
2019	Cheer Up, Mr. Lee	Choong-sik	
2023	Believer 2	Kang Deok-cheon	
2024	Escape	Park Jun-pyeong	

=== Television series ===
Year	Title	Role	Notes
2013	Medical Top Team		
2018	KBS Drama Special	Heo Yoon-ki	Episode: "Forgotten Season"
2019	My Lawyer, Mr. Jo 2: Crime and Punishment	Kook Jong-bok	
2019	Persona	K	Episode: "Walking at Night"
2019	VIP	Cha Jin-ho	
2019	KBS Drama Special	Jung Hyun-jun	Episode: "Good Bye, B1"
2020–21	Hush	Choi Kyung-woo	
2025	Resident Playbook	Goo Do-won	
2026	A Bona Fide Killer	Kwon Tae-sung	

== Awards and nominations ==
Year	Award	Category	Nominated work	Result
2019	KBS Drama Awards	Best New Actor	My Lawyer, Mr. Jo 2: Crime and Punishment	Nominated
2026	Baeksang Art Awards	Best New Actor	Resident Playbook	Nominated
