= The Beauty Inside (2015 film) =

- Theatrical release poster
- Hangul: 뷰티 인사이드
- RR: Byuti insaideu
- MR: Pyut'i insaidŭ
- Directed by: Baik (Baek Jong-yul)
- Written by: Kim Sun-jung; Noh Kyung-hee
- Based on: The Beauty Inside by Drake Doremus
- Produced by: Park Tae-joon
- Starring: Han Hyo-joo
- Cinematography: Kim Tae-gyeong
- Edited by: Yang Jin-mo
- Music by: Jo Yeong-wook
- Production company: Yong Film
- Distributed by: Next Entertainment World
- Release date: August 20, 2015
- Running time: 126 minutes
- Country: South Korea
- Language: Korean
- Box office: US$14.3 million

The Beauty Inside (Korean: 뷰티 인사이드) is a 2015 South Korean romantic comedy film based on the 2012 American social film The Beauty Inside, about a man who wakes up every day in a different body, starring Han Hyo Joo. It is Baik's feature film debut, after a career directing commercials.

== Plot ==
One fateful day, on his eighteenth birthday, Woo-jin wakes up to see a face and body that is not his own. Shocked and confused, he confronts his mother with his new appearance, and she is also shocked but tearfully accepts him for who he is. With the help of his mother, Mun Suk, and his best friend, Song-beck, Woo-jin is able to cope with his strange condition. Woo-jin, now a furniture designer, wakes up in a different body every day, regardless of age, gender and ethnicity. Sometimes he's a man, a woman, old, young, or from a different country. He can even speak different languages, depending on who he is for the day. He's the same person on the inside, but on the outside he's always someone new. Looking at a different face in the mirror every morning is hard for him to get used to.

Every morning Woo-jin records himself on his computer, letting himself know who he was that day. And every morning he has to accustom himself to the changes of being a different person. He has to adjust to his new body, eyesight, voice etc As a furniture designer Woo-jin is able to work in the privacy of his own home and to avoid others finding out his secret. He owns a furniture company named ALX that specializes on handcrafted furniture designed for each individual client. His best friend Song-beck works with him, taking care of sales and going to meet Woo-jin's clients in person.

One day, Woo-jin develops a crush on a woman named Yi-soo who works in a furniture store. He begins to visit her every day to see her and occasionally talk to her, but she doesn't realize this because he comes in as someone else each day. He waits until the right day when he is someone handsome (Park Seo-Joon) to finally approach her and ask her out on a date. He succeeds in asking her out and wants to continue seeing her as the same person. As a result, he goes for several days without sleep in order to stay as the same person that first went out with Yi-soo. He inevitably fails to keep the same body due to sleep deprivation and decides to stop contacting Yi-soo because he does not want to reveal his secret to her. Woo-Jin becomes a temp where Yi-soo works and asks her to dinner. She is hesitant but goes with the female Woo-Jin to his house where he tells her who she/he is. She is shocked and it takes her some time to comprehend and accept Woo-jin for who he is on the inside.

They remain together and devise a plan to reunite with each other every time Woo-jin transforms. Whenever Woo-jin grabs Yi-soo's hand she'll know that it's him. Or at least that's the idea. Yi-soo, after some time starts having difficulty with their relationship. She never truly knows who Woo-jin is and has to fully trust that the stranger grabbing her hand is Woo-jin. People begin to gossip about Yi-soo, saying that she is always going out with different men. This pushes her to a breaking point where she relies on medication to be able to cope with her stress, anxiety, and insomnia. In order to help her, Woo-jin decides to disappear from her life. Time goes by but Yi-soo never stops loving Woo-jin and is determined to find him.

Woo-Jin finds out from his mother that his father had the same condition and that is why his father left them.

Yi-soo is able to find Woo-jin once again in a different country (the Czech Republic). She confesses to him that she still loves him and wants to spend her life with him. After this confession Woo-jin proposes to Yi-soo and she accepts.

== Cast ==
=== Main ===
- Han Hyo-joo as Yi-soo

=== Supporting ===
- Kim Dae-myung as Woo-jin
- Do Ji-han as Woo-jin
- Bae Seong-woo as Woo-jin
- Park Shin-hye as Woo-jin
- Lee Beom-soo as Woo-jin
- Park Seo-joon as Woo-jin
- Kim Sang-ho as Woo-jin
- Chun Woo-hee as Woo-jin
- Juri Ueno as Woo-jin
- Lee Jae-joon as Woo-jin
- Kim Min-jae as Woo-jin
- Lee Hyun-woo as Woo-jin
- Jo Dal-hwan as Woo-jin
- Lee Jin-wook as Woo-jin
- Hong Da-mi as Woo-jin
- Seo Kang-joon as Woo-jin
- Kim Hee-won as Woo-jin
- Lee Dong-wook as Woo-jin
- Go Ah-sung as Woo-jin
- Kim Joo-hyuk as Woo-jin
- Yoo Yeon-seok as Woo-jin
- Lee Seung-chan as Woo-jin
- Kwon Gi-ha as Woo-jin
- Lee Dong-hwi as Sang-baek, Woo-jin's friend
- Moon Sook as Woo-jin's mother
- Lee Geung-young as Woo-jin's father
- Kim Si-eun as Woo-jin's mother in the past
- Lee Mi-do as Hong Eun-soo, Yi-soo's older sister
- Choi Yong-min as Yi-soo's father
- Lee Bom as Lounge girl
- Shin Dong-mi as Department head
- Kim Rok-kyeong as Woo-jin 52
- Kim Gwang-seop as Woo-jin 86
- Park Keun-rok as Woo-jin 44
- Yoon-hwan as Woo-jin 19
- Kim Yeon-hee as Woo-jin 39
- Son Seong-chan as Woo-jin 77
- Park Min-soo as Woo-jin 80
- Jang Eui-soo as Woo-jin 106

== International release ==
The Beauty Inside pre-sold its distribution rights at the Cannes Film Market to 11 Asian countries, including Japan, Hong Kong, Macau, Taiwan, Singapore, Malaysia, Indonesia, Brunei and the Philippines.

Well Go USA released the film theatrically on September 11, 2015, with a DVD and Blu-ray release set for February 2, 2016.

== Box office ==
The Beauty Inside earned a total gross of US$14,291,242 from 2,057,896 total admissions. There was a total of 646 screenings for the film.

== Critical response ==
On the website Rotten Tomatoes, the film had an approval rating of 70% based on 10 reviews, with a weighted average of 5.7/10. Another media aggregator website, Metacritic, weighted the film with an average score of 48 out of 100, based on 5 critics. Katie Walsh from the Los Angeles Times writes, "It's satisfying, charming and surprising - a film that keeps its supernatural elements grounded in reality, with the focus on the spirituality of true love.

== Remake and adaptations ==
=== Film ===
In January 2017, it was announced that Emilia Clarke had been cast as the female lead in an upcoming American remake of the film, with Scott Neustadter and Michael H. Weber writing the script.

=== Television series ===
In July 2018, it was announced that Seo Hyun-jin has been cast as the female lead in a Korean drama remake of the film, alongside Lee Min-ki.

== Awards and nominations ==
Year	Award	Category	Recipient	Result
2015	52nd Grand Bell Awards	Best Actress	Han Hyo-joo	Nominated
2015	52nd Grand Bell Awards	Best New Director	Baik	Won
2015	52nd Grand Bell Awards	Best Screenplay	Kim Seon-jeong, Park Jeong-ye	Nominated
2015	36th Blue Dragon Film Awards	Best Actress	Han Hyo-joo	Nominated
2015	36th Blue Dragon Film Awards	Best Cinematography	Kim Tae-gyeong	Nominated
2015	36th Blue Dragon Film Awards	Best Editing	Yang Jin-mo	Won
2015	36th Blue Dragon Film Awards	Best Lighting	Hong Seung-cheol	Nominated
2015	36th Blue Dragon Film Awards	Best Music	Jo Yeong-wook	Nominated
2015	Korea Film Actors' Association Awards	Top Star Award	Han Hyo-joo	Won
2016	11th Max Movie Awards	Best Actress	Han Hyo-joo	Nominated
2016	52nd Baeksang Arts Awards	Best Actress (Film)	Han Hyo-joo	Nominated
2016	25th Buil Film Awards	Best Actress	Han Hyo-joo	Nominated
2016	10th Asian Film Awards	Best Supporting Actress	Juri Ueno	Nominated
