= Double Patty =

2021 South Korean film directed by Paek Seung-hwan

- Film poster
- Hangul: 더블패티
- RR: Deobeul paeti
- MR: Tŏbŭl p'aet'i
- Directed by: Paek Seung-hwan
- Written by: Paek Seung-hwan
- Produced by: Paek Seung-hwan
- Starring: Shin Seung-ho; Irene
- Cinematography: Shin Hyeon-gyu
- Edited by: Kim Seong-hoon
- Music by: Lee Sang-hoon
- Production company: Vac.grimm
- Distributed by: kth; Pancinema
- Release date: February 17, 2021
- Running time: 107 minutes
- Country: South Korea
- Language: Korean

Double Patty (Korean: 더블패티) is a 2021 South Korean drama film directed by Paek Seung-hwan. The film stars Shin Seung-ho and Irene.

== Synopsis ==
Kang Woo-ram is a successful ssireum wrestler who has a good bond with his coach and fellow wrestlers. One of the wrestlers becomes his arch-rival and his mentor later becomes sick and dies. Unhappy with the turn of events he gives up on wrestling and moves away from his hometown in Yeongam to Seoul, where he takes on the job of a bouncer at a drag queen bar called Tracks. His boss has got a loan to be collected and assigns that job to Woo-ram, who collects the money after easily disposing of all the goons of the guy who owes money. With their pride hurt, the goons come back, ambush Woo-ram, and whack him severely on the back of his head. Although the injuries are not severe, it serves as a wake-up call for Woo-ram to realise that this gig is not for him.

Dazed from the attack, he drifts into Burger from Heaven restaurant and there he meets waitress Lee Hyun-ji. which he had already come across a few times in the past, without ever speaking to her. Smitten by her, he orders the buy-one-get-one-free double patty burgers. With the pretext of ordering those burgers, Woo-ram heads there every night but can't sum up the courage to speak to her. Hyun-ji notices his interest in her, but she is also shy enough not to express her interest in him. They observe each other every night whenever Woo-ram is there but dare not to ruin the moment. During this time, Woo-ram observes how hard Hyun-ji is studying while working at the restaurant and starts respecting her: Hyun-ji in fact, is a would-be anchor who during the day juggles between a babysitting job and auditions, while at night works as a waitress.

One night, Woo-ram gets the news that his mentor's funeral would be arranged in a couple of days. Depressed, he drinks down his sorrows and heads to Burger from Heaven to see Hyun-ji as usual, but he winds bashing his head into the wall due to the stupor. Hyun-ji pities him and takes him out as she knows who Woo-ram is and what he is going through. They head back to her home and she encourages him to face the demons of his past by expressing that she would also come along with him if he attends the funeral.

Motivated, Woo-ram goes back to the country and attends the funeral. There, he regains the motivation to become a wrestler again after Hyun-ji tells him not to stress up too much. Both of them embark on realizing their individual dreams and they slog hard. Hyun-ji takes multiple exams and gives various screen tests, speaking from her heart and impressing the judges. Simultaneously, Woo-ram defeats the various wrestlers at the lightweight wrestling championship and heads to the finals which pits him against his arch-rival. Despite his best efforts, Woo-ram loses the fight; on the other end, Hyun-ji gets selected for the final round. After impressing the judges, Hyun-ji sees a news report which shows that Woo-ram and his arch-rival are going to spar once more to settle their feud once and for all. She arrives just in time to witness the final round, and seeing her cheering for him, Woo-ram gets motivated and defeats his arch-rival in a thumping victory.

Time passes. Hyun-ji becomes a successful field reporter, while Woo-ram is called by Korean military for the mandatory service. At the army base, Woo-ram's superiors get the word that someone is eating two double-patty burgers and they wonder who has that capacity to down so much of food. While listening to his superiors gawk at that, Woo-ram quietly smiles as he watches Hyun-ji's news report on the TV.

== Cast ==
- Shin Seung-ho as Kang Woo-ram
- Irene as Lee Hyun-ji
- Song Ji-in as Choi Se-young
- Lee Byung-soo as Hwang Se-joon
- Yoo Byung-hoon as Coach Go
- Lee Ji-hyun as Kang Ji-hyun
- Heo Nam-jun as Han Sang-wook
- Paek Joo-hwan as Ki-ho
- Kwak Min-seok as Choi Gu-cheol
- Jo Dal-hwan as Il-woo
- Min Seung-wook as Sung-hwan
- Jung Young-joo as Moon Hee-jung
- Clara Lee as foreign journalist

== Production ==
=== Development ===
The screenplay was written by director Paek Seung-hwan, who described the film as a "production that tells the story of two young people running parallel to each other towards their goals and dreams". Paek incorporated his own experiences into writing Hyun-ji, having himself earned a degree in journalism and broadcasting, and created her "with the hope that she would become an announcer with a strong sense of professionalism". For Woo-ram, he spoke to several wrestlers, and after finding out that they worked other jobs to earn a living because there were no national teams or professional leagues, he decided to reflect this reality in the plot. On the choice of the title, which peculiarly refers to hamburgers, he said: "When you think of youth, hunger also comes to mind. Food appears several times in our film, as if to say: Let's have a bite. Personally, I like hamburgers and I usually don't eat just a single one. The title Double Patty was decided because I wanted to convey the message: Just one is not enough". The "double patty" means that the characters have double the energy, dreams, and passion, but also double the frustration.

=== Casting ===
Double Patty marked the film debut of Red Velvet's Irene, credited in the film under her real name, Bae Joo-hyun; her casting was announced on July 16, 2020. Since Hyun-ji uses different tone and vocalization at the beginning and end of the film to signal her improvement as an aspiring announcer, Bae paid attention to this aspect, receiving lessons from a professional announcer, filming herself and listening to her tapes multiple times.

For the role of Kang Woo-ram, a professional ssireum fighter, Paek Seung-hwan wanted an actor similar to Channing Tatum. Shin Seung-ho's casting was announced on July 22, 2020, although he was cast before Bae. The actor was recommended to the director by Paek's long-time collaborator Jung Young-joo, who had worked with Shin on the 2019 television series At Eighteen. To prepare for the role, Shin began training two months before filming, frequenting the same accommodations, cafeteria, and gyms used by professionals. Through exercise and a specific diet, he reduced his body fat and increased his muscle mass. He also tanned to look more like an athlete, and said that he was able to relate to the character because he played soccer for 11 years before changing careers, thus understanding what it felt like to be on the verge of giving up on your dreams like Woo-ram. Shin shot all of the fight scenes without a stunt double.

=== Filming ===
A joint script reading was held on July 21, 2020, attended by Shin Seung-ho, Bae Joo-hyun, and the production staff. Filming took place from August 4 to September 12, 2020. As of October 2020, the film was in post-production.

=== Music ===
Bae Joo-hyun and Shin Seung-ho each recorded one song for the film's original soundtrack: A White Night, performed by Bae, is inspired by Paek Sŏk's poem of the same name and is a waltz about the elegance of youth; Night Sky, performed by Shin, is a vintage rock piece that evokes the cool summer nights in Itaewon. The soundtrack was released on February 14, 2021, accompanied by music videos for the two songs. A White Night ranked number one on the iTunes charts in eight countries upon its release.

All lyrics are written by Paek Seung-hwan; all music is composed by Lee Sang-hoon.

No.	Title	Performed by	Length
1.	"A White Night" (흰 밤; Huin bam)	Irene	4:33
2.	"Night Sky" (밤한울; Bamhanul)	Shin Seung-ho	4:33
3.	"Double Patty" (더블패티)		2:32
4.	"Day by Day"		1:09
5.	"Youth"		4:31
6.	"Looking Forward"		1:08
7.	"A Time for Us" (우리를 위한 시간; Urireul wihan sigan)		4:16
8.	"After Blue" (남겨진 마음들; Namgyeojin maeumdeul; 'The feelings that remain')		3:44
9.	"Here We Go!"		2:38
10.	"Hopeful" (바람; Baram)		1:32
11.	"Breaking Dawn"		4:43
12.	"I See the Light" (바라보다; Baraboda)		2:00
13.	"A White Night" (Inst.) (흰 밤)		4:33
14.	"Night Sky" (Inst.) (밤한울)		4:33
Total length:			46:25

== Release ==
Double Patty was originally scheduled to hit South Korean theaters in late 2020, but was ultimately released on February 17, 2021. The production denied that the delay was caused by the controversy surrounding Bae in October 2020, when she was accused of bullying a staff member who assisted her during a photo shoot.

The first teaser trailer was released on January 18, 2021. The poster was released on January 22, and shows the two lead actors smiling at each other while drinking at a table; the image is accompanied by the caption "To turn the tables, they will give it their all in one round!". A week later, two individual posters were released: the one dedicated to Woo-ram depicts Shin Seung-ho with a shy expression while scratching the back of his head as if he has something to say, and features the words "Let's go together!"; the one dedicated to Hyun-ji, instead, shows Bae Joo-hyun while drinking from a glass with the words "Should we eat first?" next to it.

On March 2, 2021, the film was made available for streaming on KT's OTT platform Seezn. A prize event was organised to celebrate the launch.

== Reception ==
Despite being released during the COVID-19 pandemic, at a time of depression for the film industry, Double Patty surpassed 10,000 admissions in South Korea in four days on February 21, a milestone that was commemorated with the release of a special poster depicting the first meeting between the protagonists, captioned "Our relationship that gives us 'strength' just by looking at her has begun". It remained in the top 10 at the box office during its first week, and in its first eight days of release (February 17–24, 2021) it sold 12,356 tickets for a gross of $96,664. By the end of February, it had reached 13,341 tickets.

Reviewing the film for Cine21, Kim Sung-hoon wrote that "rather than being a typical romantic story where a man and a woman become lovers, [Double Patty] features a healthy relationship in which they give each other strength and courage as they face real life. It is both admirable and sad to see them live diligently in a reality where nothing is easy"; however, he found the fact that their repeated meetings were due to coincidences to be artificial and disappointing.
