= Baik (director) =

South Korean film director (born 1970)

Baek Jong-yul
- Born: 1970 (age 55–56); South Korea
- Occupation: Film director

Korean name
- Hangul: 백종열
- RR: Baek Jongyeol
- MR: Paek Chongyŏl

Baek Jong-yul (Korean: 백종열; born 1970), known as Baik, is a South Korean film director. Baik worked as a visual artist and advertisement director before entering the film industry. His feature debut - a romantic comedy film The Beauty Inside (2015), deals with the love between a man who becomes a different person every day and a girl (played by Han Hyo-joo), who loves him. Baik said that there were definitely challenges to create a film with so many different actors playing the same character as each actor came to the set with his or her own interpretation of the character. His effort won him the Best New Director at the 52nd Grand Bell Awards in 2015.

== Filmography ==
=== Film ===
- Oldboy (2003) - production dept
- S Diary (2004) - marketing
- Rules of Dating (2005) - trailer
- Sad Movie (2005) - marketing
- Voice of a Murderer (2007) - production dept
- Couples (2011) - production dept
- Snowpiercer (2013) - visual effects
- The Beauty Inside (2015) - director, visual effects, poster
- Believer 2 (2023), director
- Reawaken Man: The Red (2026), director

=== Music video ===
- Burn It Up (2017) - director

== Awards ==
- 2015 52nd Grand Bell Awards: Best New Director (The Beauty Inside)
