= Shin Eun-soo =

South Korean actress (born 2002)

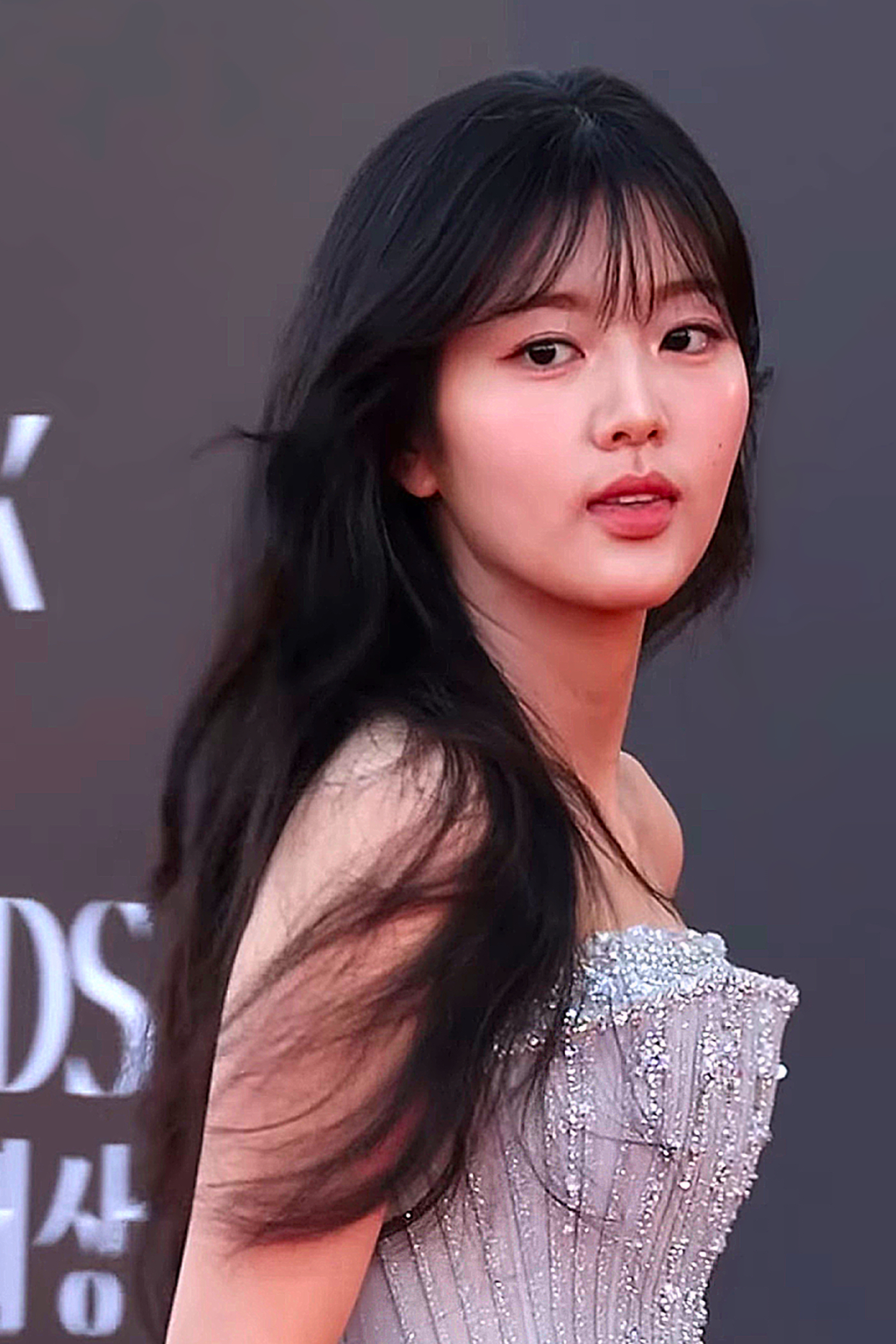
- Shin in 2026
- Born: October 23, 2002 (age 24)
- Occupation: Actress
- Years active: 2016–present
- Agent: Management Soop

Korean name
- Hangul: 신은수
- Hanja: 申恩秀
- RR: Sin Eunsu
- MR: Sin Ŭnsu
- Website: msoopent.com

Shin Eun-soo (Korean: 신은수; October 23, 2002) is a South Korean actress. She made her acting debut in the film Vanishing Time: A Boy Who Returned (2016), and became best known for starring in the television series Bad Papa (2018), Twinkling Watermelon (2023), and the coming-of-age film Love Untangled (2025). She garnered several awards, as well as Best New Actress nominations from the Baeksang Art Awards, Chunsa Film Arts Awards and Grand Bell Awards.

== Career ==
=== Pre-debut ===
Shin Eun-soo joined JYP Entertainment (JYPE) in 2014 to train as both a singer and an actress.

In 2015, she auditioned for the female lead role in the movie Vanishing Time: A Boy Who Returned, written and directed by Um Tae-hwa. Although she had never acted before, Shin was chosen out of 300 candidates to act alongside Gang Dong-won. She was given two months of preparation and acting training. The filming started on October 7 and she was officially introduced by JYPE on the 14th through the agency's SNS channels. She attended her first production conference at Apgujeong CGV in Gangnam District, Seoul on October 11, 2016.

=== 2016–present : Acting debut ===
Shin debuted as an actress on November 16, 2016, with the release of Vanishing Time: A Boy Who Returned. She was praised for her performance in a major role despite being a newcomer in such a young age.

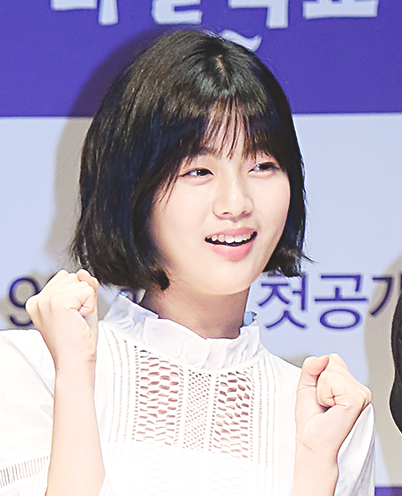
Shin in September 2017

In late November 2016, she acted as the teenage of Jun Ji-hyun's character in the television series The Legend of the Blue Sea. In December, she was cast in a short film directed by Shunji Iwai titled Chang-ok's Letter where she played as Bae Doona and Kim Joo-hyuk's daughter. It was released on Nestle Theater's YouTube channel on February 16, 2017. She then lent her voice for the female lead in animated film titled The Shower, released in August. Shin also appeared as a supporting cast in the pre-produced web series by JYP Pictures titled School of Magic, along with several actors from her agency, which premiered on September 11.

In 2018, Shin starred with another lead role, alongside Jung Jae-won, in a one-act romance drama titled Anthology—a part of tvN's Drama Stage. She then acted in the film titled Illang: The Wolf Brigade, where she worked with actor Gang Dong-won for the second time. It was released on July 25, 2018. In July, she was cast in the family melodrama Bad Papa, playing the daughter of Jang Hyuk.

In 2019 and 2020, she played supporting roles in the film Homme Fatale, and in television series SF8 and Do Do Sol Sol La La Sol. In 2022, Shin made a special appearance in KBS2's historical drama Bloody Heart as the childhood of Kang Han-na's character, and was reunited with Jang Hyuk whom she previously acted with in Bad Papa. The same year, she had a supporting role in the Netflix drama, A Model Family. She plays the daughter Yeonwoo, who encourages her parents to split.

Within the next year, she gained critical praise for her back-to-back portrayal of a rebellious and lonely high school senior on a journey to find closeness and freedom in the drama special Like Otters, and as a deaf student who falls in love in time travel romance series Twinkling Watermelon, In 2024, she would then debut in the Kang Full universe through the Disney+ fantasy series, Light Shop. She plays Joo Hyun Joo, a mysterious young girl who visits the shop every day to buy a light bulb.

On March 12, 2025, Management Soop announced that Shin had signed an exclusive contract with the agency. On August 29, 2025, she starred in the coming of age rom-com Love Untangled, which premiered exclusively on Netflix. Upon its release, it became the most watched non-English film on the streaming service, with Shin's portrayal of bubbly protagonist Park Se-ri gaining her a nomination for Baeksang Arts Award for Best New Actress – Film.

== Other ventures ==
=== Ambassadorship ===
In 2017, Shin was appointed as Honorary Ambassador of the 2nd Japan Film Festival, along with actor Yoon Park. In 2018, she was appointed as ambassador of the 20th Bucheon International Animation Festival (BIAF).

=== Endorsements ===
Shin signed her first-ever endorsement deal as the new exclusive model for South Korean skincare and cosmetics manufacturer and retailer, Skin Food. She launched a full-scale modeling activity, starting with a CF of the new product called Aqua Grape Bounce Bubble Serum for Skin Food 2017 S/S which was released on April 10, 2017. She was also featured in main page of the product.

== Personal life ==
In January 2026, it was confirmed that Shin is in a relationship with actor Yoo Seon-ho. The two reportedly met through a gathering of acquaintances.

== Filmography ==
=== Film ===
Year	Title	Role	Notes	Ref.
2016	Vanishing Time: A Boy Who Returned	Su-rin		
2017	Chang-ok's Letter	Hye-jung	Short film	
2017	The Shower	Girl	Voice	
2018	Illang: The Wolf Brigade	Lee Jae-hee		
2019	Homme Fatale	Sook Jung		
2023	Just Super	Hailey (Hedvig)	Voice; Korean dub	
2023	Tastes of Horror: Four-Legged Beast	Yu-kyung	Short film	
2025	Love Untangled	Park Se-ri		

=== Television series ===
Year	Title	Role	Notes	Ref.
2016	The Legend of the Blue Sea	teenage Se-hwa	Episodes 3–4, 13	
2018	Drama Stage: "Anthology"	Shin So-yi	One-act drama	
2018	Bad Papa	Yoo Young-sun		
2020	SF8	Hye-hwa	Episode: "Baby It's Over Outside"	
2020	Do Do Sol Sol La La Sol	Jin Ha-young		
2022	Bloody Heart	young Yoo Jeong		
2022	A Model Family	Yeon-woo		
2022	Summer Strike	Kim Bom		
2022	KBS Drama Special: "Like Otters"	Kim Jae-young	One-act drama	
2023	Twinkling Watermelon	Yoon Cheong-ah		

=== Web series ===
Year	Title	Role	Ref.
2017	School of Magic	Han Yi-seul	
2024	Light Shop	Joo Hyun-joo	

=== Hosting ===
Year	Title	Notes	Ref.
2019	Inkigayo	with Mingyu	

=== Music video appearances ===
Year	Title	Artist	Notes	Ref.
2025	"Push"	Joohoney (featuring Rei)	as Demian	

== Awards and nominations ==
Name of the award ceremony, year presented, category, nominee of the award, and the result of the nomination
Award ceremony	Year	Category	Nominee / Work	Result	Ref.
APAN Star Awards	2023	Excellence Award, Actress in a Short Drama	Like Otters	Won	
APAN Star Awards	2023	Best New Actress	Twinkling Watermelon	Nominated	
Baeksang Arts Awards	2026	Best New Actress – Film	Love Untangled	Nominated	
Chunsa Film Art Awards	2017	Best New Actress	Vanishing Time: A Boy Who Returned	Nominated	
Golden Cinematography Awards	2026	Best New Actress	Love Untangled	Won	
Grand Bell Awards	2017	Best New Actress	Vanishing Time: A Boy Who Returned	Nominated	
KBS Drama Awards	2022	Best Actress in Drama Special/TV Cinema	Like Otters	Won	
Korea First Brand Awards	2024	Best New Actress in a Series	Twinkling Watermelon	Won	
Korean Film Actor's Association Star Night	2016	Korea Top Star Award: Popular Film Star	Vanishing Time: A Boy Who Returned	Won	
MBC Drama Awards	2018	Best Child Actress	Bad Papa	Won	
