= A Model Family =

2022 South Korean television series

- Promotional poster
- Hangul: 모범가족
- Hanja: 模範家族
- Lit.: Exemplary Family
- RR: Mobeomgajok
- MR: Mobŏmgajok
- Genre: Crime; Thriller
- Developed by: Netflix
- Written by: Lee Jae-gon
- Directed by: Kim Jin-woo
- Starring: Jung Woo; Park Hee-soon; Yoon Jin-seo; Park Ji-yeon
- Music by: Choi Chul-ho
- Country of origin: South Korea
- Original language: Korean
- No. of episodes: 10

Production
- Executive producer: Nam Ki-ho
- Producers: Joo Hye-rin; Kim Jae-ha; Kim Ji-woo; Lee Seung-hee
- Editor: Nam Ja-young
- Camera setup: Multi camera
- Running time: 41–50 minutes
- Production companies: Production H; Celltrion Entertainment

Original release
- Network: Netflix
- Release: August 12, 2022

A Model Family (Korean: 모범가족) is a 2022 South Korean television series written by Lee Jae-gon, directed by Kim Jin-woo, and starring Jung Woo, Park Hee-soon, Yoon Jin-seo, and Park Ji-yeon. The series depicts the journey of realizing the importance of family and finally becoming a model family against drug gangs. It was released on Netflix on August 12, 2022.

== Synopsis ==
After unwittingly stealing money from a cartel, a cash-strapped professor finds the only way to save his broken family is by working as a drug courier.

== Cast ==
=== Main ===
- Jung Woo as Dong-ha
- Park Hee-soon as Gwang-cheol
- Yoon Jin-seo as Eun-joo
- Park Ji-yeon as Joo-hyun

=== Supporting ===
- Kim Sung-oh as Choi Kang-jun, the new face of a drug gang whose eyes show madness.
- Won Hyun-jun
- Kim Shin-bi as Oh Jae-chan
- Park Doo-shik as Min-gyu, is a member of Gwangcheol's group.
- Shin Eun-soo as Yeon-woo
- Seok Min-gi as Hyun-woo
- Heo Jin-na
- Oh Kwang-rok
- Moon Jin-seung

=== Special appearance ===
- Heo Sung-tae as Ma Sa-jang, Dong-ha's first drug delivery recipient.
- Kim Joo-hun as Yoo Han-cheol

== Production ==
=== Casting ===
In January 2021 it was reported that Jung Woo was considering to appear in the series. In April 2021 it was reported that Park Hee-soon would join the cast replacing the role of So Ji-sub, who is known to have declined his appearance. On August 31, 2021, they were officially joined by Yoon Jin-seo and Park Ji-yeon, casting lineup was announced by releasing photos.
