= Hello, Brother =

- Film poster
- Hangul: 안녕, 형아
- Hanja: 安寧, 兄아
- Lit.: Hello/Goodbye, Older Brother
- RR: Annyeong, hyeonga
- MR: Annyŏng, hyŏnga
- Directed by: Lim Tai-hyung
- Written by: Kim Eun-Jeong
- Produced by: Shim Bo-Kyoung
- Starring: Bae Jong-ok; Choi Jin-ho; Choi Woo-hyuk; Jeon Hye-jin; Oh Ji-hye; Park Ji-bin; Park Won-sang; Seo Dae-han; Yang Hyeon-woo
- Cinematography: Kim Young-ho
- Edited by: Lee Hyun-mi
- Music by: Lee Ji-soo
- Production companies: Myung Films; Cinema Service; OCN; KD Media
- Distributed by: MK Pictures
- Release date: 27 May 2005 (South Korea)
- Running time: 95 minutes
- Country: South Korea
- Language: Korean

Hello, Brother (Korean: 안녕, 형아), also known as Little Brother, is a 2005 South Korean drama film directed by Lim Tai-hyung. The film starred Bae Jong-ok, Park Won-sang, and Park Ji-bin.

== Plot ==
Hello, Brother is a family drama which portrays a mischievous young boy's reaction to his older brother's battle with childhood cancer. It is based on the true story of siblings Seol-hwi and Chang-hwi.

== Cast ==
- Bae Jong-ok: the mother
- Park Won-sang: the father
- Park Ji-bin: Han-yi, the younger brother
- Seo Dae-han: Han-byeol, the older brother suffering from cancer
- Choi Woo-hyuk: Wook-yi, another young patient in the pediatric ward
- Jeon Hye-jin: Han-yi's homeroom teacher
- Oh Ji-hye: Wook-yi's mother
- Choi Jin-ho: Dr. Na Yeong-soo
- Yang Hyeon-woo

== Production ==
Entertainment company MK Buffalo (Note: Korean: MK버팔로; RR: MK Beopallo; KRX: 076170.) announced in August 2004 that it would invest ₩3.2 billion into the film, with ₩1.8 billion budgeted for production costs and ₩1.4 billion for marketing. In early September, the company began raising funds for production by public subscription over the internet, promising 80% minimum capital preservation and distribution of additional profits if domestic viewership exceeded 1.15 million. It was believed to be the first South Korean film to attempt to raise 100% of production funds from the public prior to beginning production; the 1999 film Happy End had raised a portion of its production funds in a similar way, while the 2003 film A Good Lawyer's Wife had previously raised funds from internet users after production was complete.

However, on 8 September, South Korea's Financial Supervisory Service (FSS) intervened and ordered MK Buffalo to cease public fundraising, stating that the company had violated the Indirect Asset Management Business Act (Note: 간접투자자산 운용업법. For an English translation of the law, see "Indirect Investment Asset Management Business Act". Ministry of Government Legislation. Archived from the original on 10 October 2017.) with its attempt to raise funds from the public without an asset management license, and possibly with its promise of capital preservation. The company announced the following day that it would comply with the order but that it did not agree that its activities violated the law. In mid-November, MK Buffalo announced that it would restructure the internet fund as an anonymous partnership, (Note: a kind of contract similar to the German Stille Gesellschaft or the Japanese tokumei kumiai.) in a second attempt to raise funds for the production from the public without violating securities regulations. Regulation of anonymous partnerships was not under the jurisdiction of the FSS; the Ministry of Finance and Economy regarded this as a loophole in investor protection laws but had no authority to intervene. By late November, MK Buffalo had raised its increased target of ₩1.95 billion from 430 investors.

Filming began on 11 October, while the funding controversy was still ongoing, and by 15 November the company stated it was roughly halfway complete. By early January, filming had not yet ended, though it was said to be 90% complete, with a target release date in late April. One particularly difficult scene was the one in which character Han-byeol first received cancer treatment, filmed at Chung-Ang University Medical Center. It was difficult to take smooth shots in the highly public setting, and work even had to be stopped temporarily due to complaints from patients and their visiting family members; combined with the emotional nature of the scene, this took its toll on the actors. Filming was completed on 20 January. The trailer was released on 6 February, and the poster on 1 April. Soundtrack work continued in March, with veteran singer Kim Jang-hoon and child actor Park Ji-bin recording a duet for release as a promotional music video. On 12 April, the release date was officially announced as 27 May.

== Release and reception ==
An early screening of the film was held on 2 May for 600 people, including 80 of the 430 investors from whom MK Buffalo had raised funds. Investors had extremely optimistic expectations for their rate of return. Another special screening was held on 5 May for young patients at Asan Medical Center. Distribution rights for Japan, China (including Hong Kong), and Singapore were sold to Japanese company Shochiku for US$300,000 just prior to the film's South Korean release.

Hello, Brother was expected to face stiff competition on its release date from Star Wars: Episode III – Revenge of the Sith, which was released the previous day in South Korea. By 25 May, Star Wars III had sold 88.8% of its release day tickets through advance reservation, as compared to just 4.88% for Hello, Brother. It came in second place behind Star Wars III at the box office on its release weekend, with 316,705 viewers in 194 cinemas. Word-of-mouth contributed to the film's popularity and gave it a strong second week, including 219 thousand viewers during the long weekend for Memorial Day. The week after that it received another 122,881 viewers, breaking the one-million mark, though still short of the break-even point of 1.2 million viewers. By 19 June, after the fourth weekend, the film had received a total of 1,089,276 viewers, giving it enough revenue to cover the minimum guarantee of returning 80% of the initial capital to investors, but still short of returning profit. Prospects for future viewership were not bright; although it was not facing competition from other family films at the time, it had already been moved to the smallest screening hall in many cinemas.
