= Jindeok of Silla =

28th monarch of Silla (r. 647–654)

Jindeok
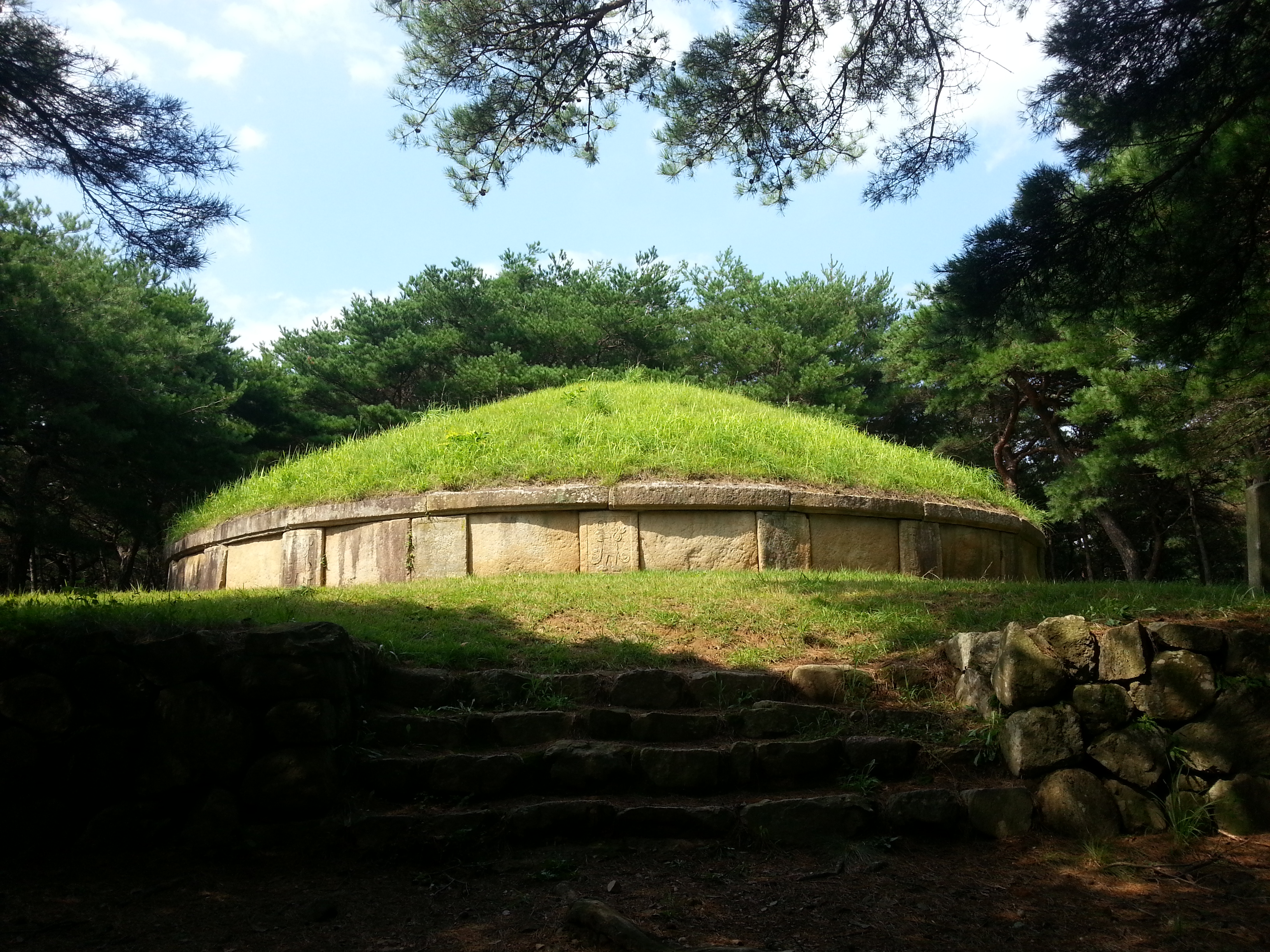
- Tomb believed to belong to Jindeok (2015)

Queen of Silla
- Reign: 647–654
- Coronation: 647
- Predecessor: Queen Seondeok
- Successor: Muyeol
- Born: Unknown; Gyeongju, North Gyeongsang Province, Silla
- Died: 654; Gyeongju, North Gyeongsang Province, Silla
- Burial: Gyeongju, North Gyeongsang Province, Silla
- Father: Galmunwang Kim Gukban
- Mother: Lady Wolmyeong of the Park clan

Korean name
- Hangul: 김승만
- Hanja: 金勝曼
- RR: Gim Seungman
- MR: Kim Sŭngman

Monarch name
- Hangul: 진덕여왕
- Hanja: 眞德女王
- RR: Jindeok yeowang
- MR: Chindŏk yŏwang

Jindeok (Korean: 진덕; Hanja: 眞德; ?–654), reigned as Queen of Silla, one of the Three Kingdoms of Korea, from 647 to 654. She was the kingdom's 28th ruler, and its second reigning queen following her predecessor Queen Seondeok. During her reign, Silla jockeyed with Baekje for favor in the Chinese Tang court. She is also known for writing a poem of the Emperor Gaozong of Tang. According to the Samguk sagi, she was voluptuous, beautiful, and tall, standing at 7 chi.

== Reign ==
Queen Jindeok (r. 647–654) ascended the throne and became the Silla's second Queen regnant after Queen Seondeok. The last monarch from the ranks of the Seonggol, the highest class in the Silla's unique caste system, her real name is Kim Seung-man. Her father was Kim Gukban, who was King Jinpyeong's youngest brother, and her mother was Lady Wolmyeong.

During her seven-year reign Queen Jindeok's primary concern was foreign policy. With the help of General Kim Yushin she was able to strengthen Silla's defenses and greatly improve her kingdom's relations with Tang China. Those efforts laid the foundation for the unification of the three kingdoms, (Silla, Baekje, and Goguryeo). She also expanded the Pumju tax-collecting system.

The Tomb of Queen Jindeok is located on the hill in Gyeongju, although some historians question whether or not it is genuinely her tomb. According to the Samguk sagi she was buried at Saryangbu, which is located in the opposite direction from the tomb.

A statue of Queen Jindeok's lower body was found at Zhao Mausoleum (昭陵, Hangul: 소릉), the tomb of Emperor Taizong of Tang in Xi'an.

== Legacy ==
When King Jeonggang was dying in 887, he appointed his sister Jinseong as his heir, justifying the choice of a female monarch by pointing to Seondeok's and Jindeok's successful reigns.

The poem written by Queen Jindeok is Chidangtaepyeongsong (치당태평송; 致唐太平頌).

== The name of an era ==
Queen Jindeok used the era name, Inpyeong, from January to July in 647, when she was crowned, and changed the era name to Taehwa. From July 647 to June 650, she used the name Taehwa era, but later used Yeonghwi, the name that was used during the Tang dynasty. Taehwa is the last name that Silla used independently.

== Family ==
- Father: Galmunwang Kim Guk-ban (갈문왕 김국반; 568–?)
  - Grandfather: Crown Prince Dongryun (동륜태자; 543–572), son of King Jinheung of Silla, 24th ruler of Silla, and Queen Sado of the Park clan (사도왕후 박씨)
  - Grandmother: Lady Manho of the Gyeongju Kim clan (만호부인 김씨; 573–?)
  - Uncle: Jinpyeong of Silla, 26th ruler of Silla
    - Cousin: Queen Seondeok of Silla, 27th ruler of Silla
    - Cousin: Princess Cheonmyeong of Silla
      - Cousin-once-removed: Muyeol of Silla, 29th ruler of Silla
- Mother: Lady Wolmyeong of the Park clan (월명부인 박씨; 570–?)
- Spouse
  - Kim Gi-an (김기안; 金基安; 695–?) — No issue.

== In popular culture ==
- Portrayed by Yoo Roo Na in the 1992–1993 KBS TV series Chronicle of the three Kingdoms
- Portrayed by Son Yeo-eun in the 2012–2013 KBS1 TV series Dream of the Emperor.
- Portrayed by Na Mi Hee in the 2017 KBS TV series Chronicles of Korea.
- She is a recruitable general in the mobile war game Evony: The King's Return.

== See also ==
- History of Korea
- Three Kingdoms of Korea

== Sources ==
- Kim Pusik (1145). 삼국사기 (三國史記) [History of the Three Kingdoms] (in Korean). OL 24982503M.
- Lee, Bae-yong (2008). Women in Korean History. Ewha Womans University Press.

Jindeok of Silla House of Kim Died: 654
Regnal titles
Preceded by Seondeok	Queen of Silla; 647–654	Succeeded by Muyeol
