= Park Ji-bin =

South Korean actor (born 1995)

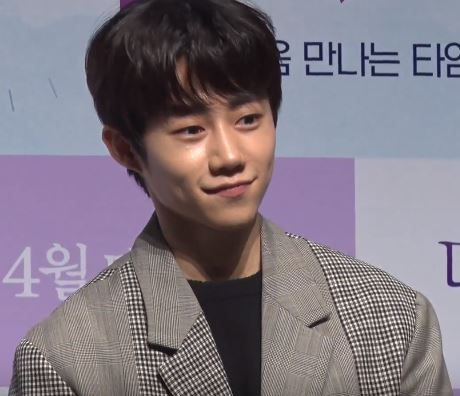
- Park in March 2019
- Born: March 14, 1995 (age 31); Seoul, South Korea
- Education: High School GED
- Occupation: Actor
- Years active: 2001–present
- Agent(s): P&B-Entertainment

Korean name
- Hangul: 박지빈
- RR: Bak Jibin
- MR: Pak Chibin

Park Ji-bin (Korean: 박지빈; born March 14, 1995) is a South Korean actor. He began his career as a child actor, notably in Hello, Brother (2005) and Boys Over Flowers (2009)

== Personal life ==
Park enlisted in the military on May 26, 2015 and was discharged on February 25, 2017.

== Filmography ==
=== Film ===
Year	Title	Role	Ref.
2004	A Family	Jeong-hwan	
2005	Hello, Brother	Jang Han-yi	
2006	Almost Love	young Ji-hwan	
2006	Ice Bar	Young-rae	
2011	Miracle (Bicycle Looking for a Whale)	Eun-chul	
2012	Children of Heaven	Jung-hoon	
2019	Spring Again	Joon-ho	
2026	My Name	Kyung-tae	

=== Television series ===
Year	Title	Role	Ref.
2003	Perfect Love	Park Jun-seo	
2004	4 Idiots	3rd brother	
2005	Drama City: "Goblins Are Alive"	Do Ga-bin	
2005	Golden Apple	young Kyung-min	
2007	My Husband's Woman	Hong Kyung-min	
2007	Lee San, Wind of the Palace	young Yi San	
2009	The Iron Empress	young Wang Song	
2009	Boys Over Flowers	Geum Kang-san	
2009	Queen Seondeok	young Bidam	
2010	Wish Upon a Star	Jin Joo-hwang	
2012	May Queen	young Kang San	
2013	Incarnation of Money	young Lee Kang-seok	
2013	The Suspicious Housekeeper	Shin Woo-jae	
2018	Tofu Personified	Tofu	
2018	Bad Papa	Jung Chan-joong	
2018	Employment	College student	
2019	Big Issue	Baek Eun-ho	
2021	Inspector Koo	Heo Hyun-tae	
2022	Bloody Heart	young Lee Tae	
2022	The Killer's Shopping List	Saeng-sun	
2022	Blind	Jung In-seong / Jung Yoon-Jae	

=== Web series ===
Year	Title	Role	Ref.
2024	A Shop for Killers	Bae Jeong-min	

=== Music video appearances ===
Year	Song title	Artist	Ref.
2003	"It's Raining"	Choi Jung-chul	
2004	"Flower Falling"	Lee Soo-young	
2007	"Fantasy"	Lee Jae-hoon	

== Musical theatre ==
Year	Title	Role	Ref.
2001	Tommy		

== Awards and nominations ==
Name of the award ceremony, year presented, category, nominee of the award, and the result of the nomination
Award ceremony	Year	Category	Nominee / Work	Result	Ref.
Grand Bell Awards	2005	Best New Actor	Hello, Brother	Nominated	
KBS Drama Awards	2005	Best Young Actor	Golden Apple, Goblins Are Alive	Won	
KBS Drama Awards	2009	Best Young Actor	Boys Over Flowers	Nominated	
MBC Drama Awards	2007	Best Young Actor	Yi San	Won	
MBC Drama Awards	2012	Best Young Actor	May Queen	Nominated	
MBC Drama Awards	2018	Best Supporting Actor in a Monday-Tuesday Miniseries	Bad Papa	Nominated	
New Montreal FilmFest	2005	Best Actor	Hello, Brother	Won	
SBS Drama Awards	2003	Best Young Actor	Perfect Love	Won	
