= Jeon Hye-jin (actress, born 1976) =

South Korean actress

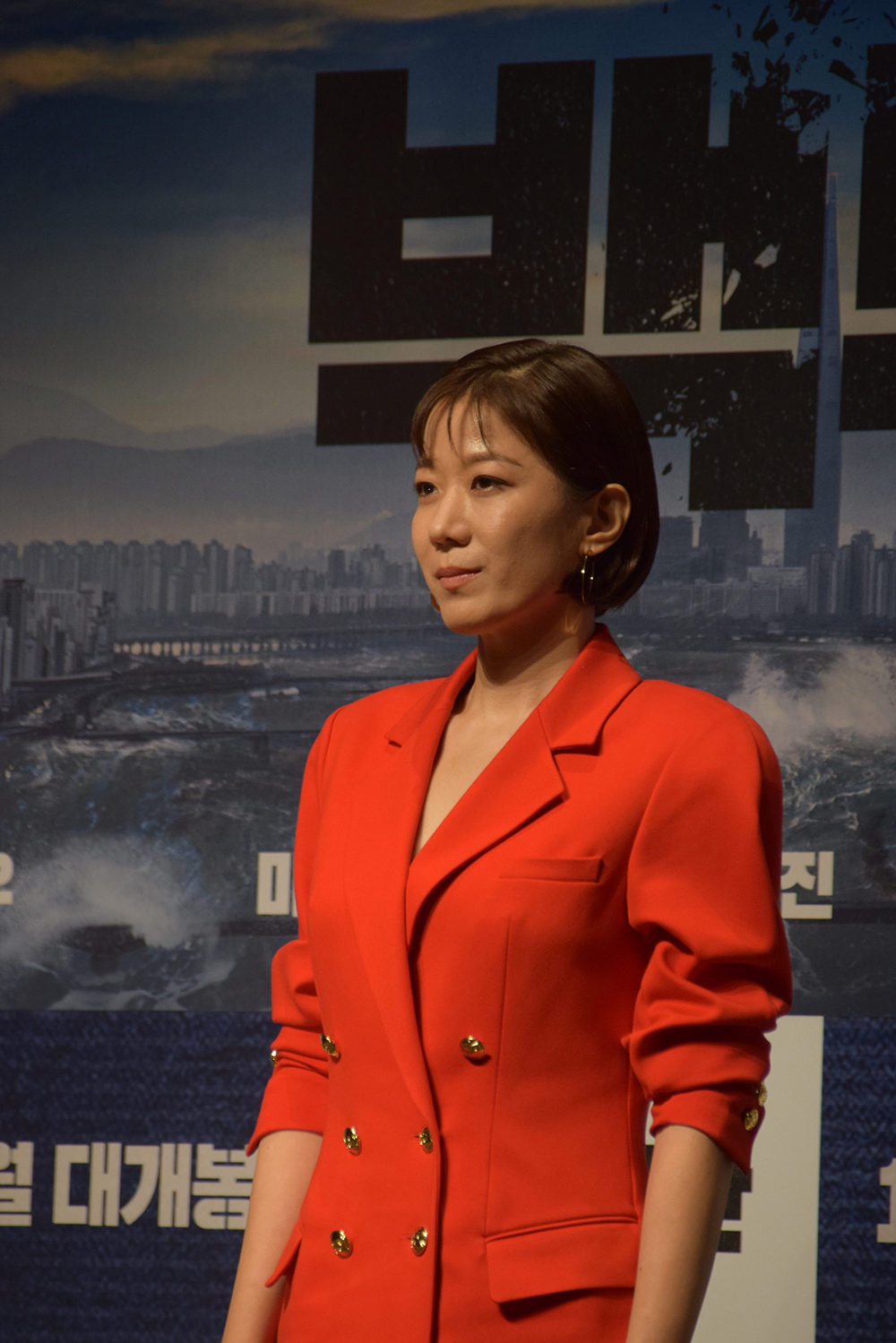
- Jeon in 2019
- Born: August 10, 1976 (age 50); South Korea
- Other name: Jeon Yi-da
- Occupation: Actress
- Years active: 1998–present
- Agent: HODU&U Entertainment
- Spouse: Lee Sun-kyun (m. 2009; died 2023)
- Children: 2

Korean name
- Hangul: 전혜진
- Hanja: 田慧振
- RR: Jeon Hyejin
- MR: Chŏn Hyejin

Jeon Hye-jin (Korean: 전혜진; born August 10, 1976) is a South Korean actress. She starred in Lee Joon-ik's historical drama The Throne (2015), for which she won a Blue Dragon Film Award for Best Supporting Actress.

== Career ==
Jeon Hye-jin, a contestant in the 1997 Miss Korea pageant representing South Gyeongsang Province, embarked on her acting career with minor roles in the film A Killing Story, released in 1998. At that time, she was a student studying directing at Sangmyung University. Although Jeon enjoyed watching movies, she never seriously considered pursuing acting as a career. However, her path took a turn when she met director Yi Sang-woo, the artistic director of the theatre company Chaimu, through the aforementioned film. He introduced her to the world of theater.

In 1998, Jeon wholeheartedly embraced the stage and began her theatrical journey with the theatre company Chaimu, using the stage name Jeon Yi-da. She went on to participate in numerous productions such as 'The Moral Thief,' 'The Sogue,' 'There,' 'Unification Express,' and 'Shape.' Her talent and presence earned her the nickname "Daehangno's Jun Ji-hyun."

In 2002, Jeon made her small screen debut with a minor role in the drama Ruler of Your Own World. Two years later, she took on a significant role as Yoon Seo-gyeong, the sister of Cha Moo-hyeok (played by So Ji-sub), in the KBS2 Monday-Tuesday drama I'm Sorry, I Love You.

In 2008, Jeon appeared as the female lead in the music video of 'Wonji' in the 5th album of Kim Kwang-jin's album, and captivated many with her innocent appearance.

Jeon rose to prominence with role Consort Yeong in Lee Joon-ik's historical drama The Throne (2015), starring Song Kang-ho and Yoo Ah-in. She won a Blue Dragon Film Award for Best Supporting Actress.

Jeon played Chun-bae, in crime-noir film The Beast, an informant who makes a risky proposal to detective Han-soo (Lee Sung-min).

== Personal life ==
Jeon married her boyfriend of seven years, actor Lee Sun-kyun, on May 23, 2009. Their agency announced that their first son was born on November 25, 2009. They had their second son on August 9, 2011. Her husband died by suicide from carbon monoxide poisoning on December 27, 2023.

== Filmography ==
Key
†	Denotes films that have not yet been released

=== Film ===
Film performances
Year	Title		Role	Notes	Ref.
Year	English	Korean	Role	Notes	Ref.
1998	A Killing Story	죽이는 이야기	Chun-ja		
2000	Lies	거짓말	Woo-ri		
2000	Happy Funeral Director	행복한 장의사	Miss Hwang	Bit part	
2002	Jungle Juice	정글 쥬스	Meg		
2005	Hello, Brother	안녕, 형아	Hani's teacher	Cameo	
2005	All for Love	내 생애 가장 아름다운 일주일	Writer Lee		
2006	Third Gaze — Between you and me	세번째 시선 — 당신과 나 사이	Wife	Omnibus film	
2006	A Cruel Attendance	잔혹한 출근	Dong-hee	Cameo	
2007	Voice of a Murderer	그놈 목소리	Lee Ae-sook		
2008	Antique	서양골동양과자점 앤티크	Boxer's girlfriend	Cameo	
2009	The Naked Kitchen	키친	Kim Seon-woo		
2009	A Little Pond	작은 연못	Jiang's mother		
2013	The Terror Live	더 테러 라이브	Park Jeong-min		
2014	Obsessed	인간중독	Choi's wife		
2015	Chronicle of a Blood Merchant	허삼관	Ms. Song		
2015	The Throne	사도	Lee Young-bin		
2016	Sori: Voice From The Heart	로봇, 소리	Hyun-sook		
2017	The Merciless	불한당: 나쁜 놈들의 세상	Chun In-sook		
2017	A Taxi Driver	택시운전사	Sang-goo's mother	Cameo	
2017	The Poet and the Boy	시인의 사랑	Mrs. Hyeon		
2017	RV: Resurrected Victims	희생부활자	Lee Soo-hyun		
2018	Hit-and-Run Squad	뺑반	Woo Sun-young		
2019	The Beast	비스트	Choon-bae		
2019	Ashfall	백두산	Jeon Yoo-kyung		
2022	Hunt	헌트	Bang Joo-kyung		
2024	Revolver	리볼버	Grace		
2024	Mission: Cross	크로스	Hee-joo		
2025	The Great Flood	대홍수	Lim Hyeon-mo	Cameo	

=== Television series ===
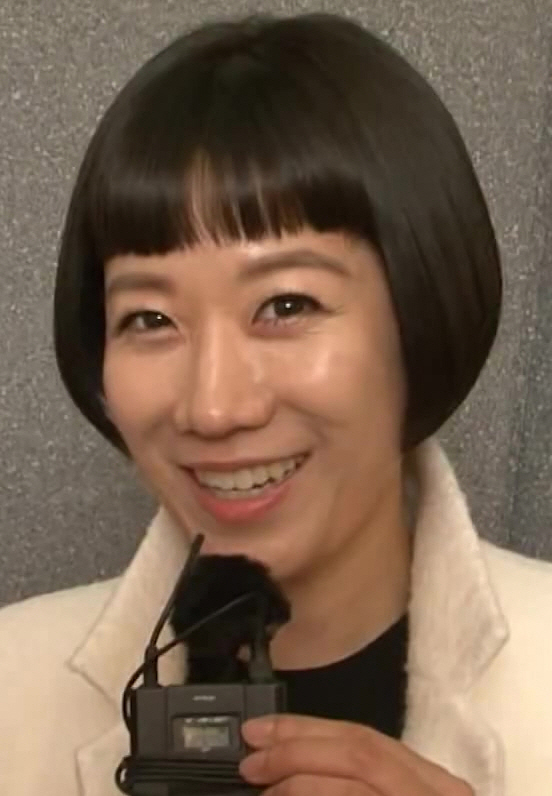
New Year's greeting of Jeon

Television series performances
Year	Title		Role	Ref.
Year	English	Korean	Role	Ref.
2002	Ruler of Your Own World	네 멋대로 해라	Song Hyun-ji	
2004	I'm Sorry, I Love You	미안하다, 사랑한다	Yoon Seo-kyung	
2005	Drama City: "She's Smiling / Memories"	드라마시티 - 납골당 소년	Dong-hee	
2007	Romance Hunter	로맨스 헌터	Ahn Ham-hee	
2018	Misty	미스티	Seo Eun-joo	
2019	Search: WWW	검색어를 입력하세요: www	Song Ga-kyeong	
2020	Stranger	비밀의 숲	Choi Bit	
2021	Uncle	엉클	Wang Jun-hee	
2023	Not Others	남남	Kim Eun-mi	
2025	Mother and Mom	아임홈	Lee Jung-eun	
2026	Reborn Rookie	신입사원 강회장	Kang Jae-gyeong	

== Theater ==
Theaters' performances
Year	Title		Role	Theater	Date	Ref.
Year	English	Korean	Role	Theater	Date	Ref.
1996	Bi Aeonso	비언소	Strange Women	Daehak-ro Information Theatre in Seoul	July 15 to August 30	
1998	Moral thief	도덕적 도둑		Cultural Center Small Theater	March 27 to April 2	
1999	Unification Express	통일 익스프레스		Daehak-ro Information Theatre in Seoul	March 18 to April 25	
2002	There	거기	Kim Jeong	Dongsung Arts Center Small Theater	October 3 to November 3	
2003	There	거기	Kim Jeong	Daehangno Sangmyung Art Hall	Jan 7 to Feb 23	
2003	Pig Hunting	돼지 사냥		Dongsung Art Centre Small Theatre from	September 19 to October 26	
2004	The story of Yangdeokwon	양덕원 이야기		Arts Theater of The Korea Culture and Arts Promotion Agency	February 25 to March 14	
2004	There	거기	Kim Jeong	Daehangno Sangmyung Art Hall	October 14 to 19	
2005	Korea Fantasy	마르고 닳도록		Seoul Arts Center Jayu Small Theater	December 1 to 17	
2008	Shape	쉐이프	Se-kyung	Dongsung Arts Center Small Theater	August 22	
2010–2011	Almost, Maine	올모스트 메인		Art One Chaimu Theater	December 22 to January 30	
2013	Love, Love, Love	러브 러브 러브	Sandra	Myeongdong Arts Theatre	March 27 to April 21	
2016	Twenty Twenty Chaimu - Tail Cotton Story	스물스물 차이무 - 꼬리솜 이야기	Ma Gap-ji	Art Plaza 2	November 6 to 29	
2016	That place - 2016 Series theatre full (滿員) - Seongnam	거기-2016 시리즈 연극 만원(滿員) - 성남	Kim Jung	Seongnam Arts Center	April 22 to 24	

== Awards and nominations ==
Name of the award ceremony, year presented, category, nominee of the award, and the result of the nomination
Award ceremony	Year	Category	Nominee / Work	Result	Ref.
APAN Star Awards	2023	Excellence Acting Award, Actress	Not Others	Nominated	
Baeksang Arts Awards	2016	Best Supporting Actress – Film	The Throne	Nominated	
Baeksang Arts Awards	2018	Best Supporting Actress – Film	The Merciless	Nominated	
Baeksang Arts Awards	2018	Best Supporting Actress – Television	Misty	Nominated	
Baeksang Arts Awards	2026	Best Acting – Theater	Anthropolis II – Laios	Nominated	
Blue Dragon Film Awards	2015	Best Supporting Actress	The Throne	Won	
Blue Dragon Film Awards	2017	Best Supporting Actress	The Merciless	Nominated	
Blue Dragon Film Awards	2022	Best Supporting Actress	Hunt	Nominated	
Buil Film Awards	2016	Best Supporting Actress	The Throne	Nominated	
Buil Film Awards	2022	Best Supporting Actress	Hunt	Nominated	
Chunsa Film Art Awards	2016	Best Supporting Actress	The Throne	Nominated	
Chunsa Film Art Awards	2018	Best Supporting Actress	The Merciless	Nominated	
Grand Bell Awards	2017	Best Supporting Actress	The Merciless	Nominated	
Grand Bell Awards	2022	Best Supporting Actress	Hunt	Nominated	
KBS Drama Awards	2006	Excellence Award, Actress in a Short Drama	Drama City "She's Smiling" / "Memories"	Won	
Korean Association of Film Critics Awards	2017	Best Supporting Actress	The Throne	Won	
Korean Association of Film Critics Awards	2022	Best Supporting Actress	Hunt	Won	
Korean Film Producers Association Awards	2015	Best Supporting Actress	The Merciless	Won	
KOFRA Film Awards	2016	Best Supporting Actress	The Throne	Won	
Max Movie Awards	2016	Best Supporting Actress	The Throne	Nominated	
The Seoul Awards	2017	Best Supporting Actress	The Merciless	Nominated	
Wildflower Film Awards	2018	Best Supporting Actress	The Poet and the Boy	Nominated	
