= My Name (film) =

2026 film by Chung Ji-young

- Theatrical release poster
- Hangul: 내 이름은
- RR: Nae ireumeun
- MR: Nae irŭmŭn
- Directed by: Chung Ji-young
- Written by: Kim Seong-hyeon; Kim Hyun-woo; Chung Ji-young
- Produced by: Kim Sun-ho; Jeong Sang-min; Jeong Seong-jin; Lee Jong-ho
- Starring: Yeom Hye-ran; Shin Woo-bin; Choi Jun-woo; Park Ji-bin
- Cinematography: Kim Hyung-gu
- Edited by: Lee Kang-il
- Music by: Shin Min
- Production companies: M83; Viva Film
- Distributed by: CJ CGV
- Release dates: February 13, 2026 (Berlinale); April 15, 2026 (South Korea)
- Running time: 113 minutes
- Country: South Korea
- Language: Korean
- Box office: US$1.5 million

My Name (Korean: 내 이름은) is a 2026 South Korean drama film directed by Chung Ji-young. The film stars Yeom Hye-ran as Jeong-sun and Shin Woo-bin as her son Young-ok. It premiered on February 13, 2026 in the Forum section of the 76th Berlin International Film Festival, followed by an official theatrical release on April 15, 2026.

== Plot ==
In the spring of 1998, 18-year-old high school student Young-ok is embarrassed by his name, which is considered old-fashioned and is often mistaken for a girl's name. He also resents that his mother Jeong-sun is nearly 60 years old and occasionally loses consciousness. Jeong-sun has no memories of the period before she was eight and suffers from dissociative episodes and seizures on windy, sunny days. She decides to seek treatment and learns from her doctor that she may have suppressed a traumatic memory.

At the beginning of the new school year, Young-ok meets Kyung-tae, a new student from Seoul known for his fighting prowess. With Kyung-tae's backing, Young-ok becomes class president for the first time. However, he gradually becomes a figurehead as Kyung-tae uses him to exert influence over the other students. Young-ok becomes increasingly caught up in the power struggles and collective violence at the school, while growing apart from his former best friend, Min-su. He also becomes increasingly concerned with his reputation and his desire to fit in, further distancing himself from his mother.

Meanwhile, Jeong-sun begins treatment with the help of a doctor, Hee-ra, who encourages her to confront the traumatic memories she has suppressed. As fragments of her childhood gradually return, she begins to reconstruct the events she had forgotten. Her search leads her across Jeju Island and back to the violent events that took place there in 1948 and 1949. Memories of the day Jeong-sun lost and promised to protect something precious gradually resurface, intertwining with Young-ok's struggle over his name and his relationship with his mother. As the past emerges, they are forced to confront the painful history that has shaped both their lives.

== Cast ==
- Yeom Hye-ran as Choi Jeong-sun
- Shin Woo-bin as Lee Young-ok
  - Yoo Jun-sang as adult Lee Young-ok
- Choi Jun-woo as Ko Min-su
  - Oh Ji-ho as adult Ko Min-su
- Park Ji-bin as Kyung-tae
- Kim Gyu-ri as Hee-ra

== Background ==
The film deals with the genocide perpetrated against the population of the island of Jeju by the Korean government, with the involvement of the US military government, beginning on April 3, 1948.

== Production ==
My Name was produced by the South Korean companies Let's Films and Aura Pictures. Worldwide distribution is handled by the South Korean company M-Line Distribution.

== Reception ==
=== Critical response ===
Yonhap News Agency praised Yeom Hye-ran's performance and the film's parallel depiction of historical and interpersonal violence, while criticizing the school subplot as overly heavy-handed and the behavior of its teenage characters as insufficiently convincing. The Korea Times similarly praised Yeom's performance and the film's exploration of generational trauma stemming from the Jeju uprising.

=== Accolades ===
Award	Date of ceremony	Category	Recipient(s)	Result	Ref.
Buil Film Awards	October 7, 2026	Best Actress	Yeom Hye-ran	Nominated	
