= Park Ji-yeon (actress, born 1988) =

South Korean singer and actress (born 1988)

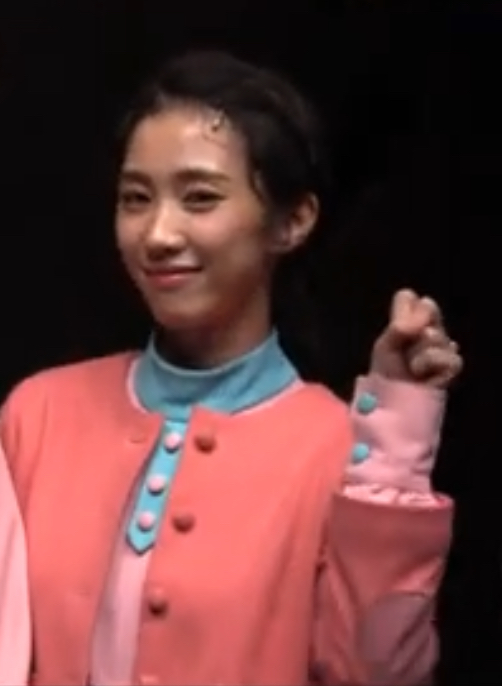
- Park in 2018
- Born: May 14, 1988 (age 38); South Korea
- Education: Seoul Institute of the Arts
- Occupation: Actress
- Years active: 2010–present

Korean name
- Hangul: 박지연
- Hanja: 朴芝妍
- RR: Bak Jiyeon
- MR: Pak Chiyŏn

Park Ji-yeon (Korean: 박지연, born May 14, 1988) is a South Korean actress. Park debuted in musical Mamma Mia! in 2010. Park has appeared in supporting roles in various dramas but is better known for her work as a musical actress.

Park's television debut was on tvN's Oh My Ghost (2015). After that, she played Kang Eun-ju in KBS2's Mad Dog (2017) and Oh Jung-soo in KBS1's Andante (2017). After that, she acted as Yoon Hoon (Kim Hye-eun) in tvN historical drama series Mr. Sunshine (2018), nurse Lee So-jung in JTBC's Life (2018), and role of Cho-hong in SBS Haechi (2019).

Her most known works in small screen are Bloody Heart (2022) that earned her best supporting actress award in 2022 KBS Drama Awards.

== Early life ==
Park developed an interest in music from an early age. While attending science major in Youngsaeng High School, Park formed a high-school rock band and sung as a vocalist. Park initially wanted to applied to the Department of Practical Music. While searching the internet to find related information, Park found musical clips for the first time. Since then Park also became interested in acting and decided to enroll in an acting academy near her house in Suwon. Park enrolled to the acting department of Seoul Institute of the Arts. However, due to her love of music, Park was not really set on becoming an actress yet.

== Career ==
In 2010, at the recommendation of a senior, Park went to the audition of Korean production of musical Mamma Mia! When Park appeared in the audition with application letter with no experience written, she made the staff nervous. However Park made everyone surprised when she sang the audition song. Park passed the audition for the role of Sophie, her debut stage was a performance held at the Gyeonggi Icheon Art Hall.

Since then, Park has been active as a main character in musical works, from Go Mi-nam (Go Mi-nyeo) in the creative musical You're Beautiful to Éponine in Les Miserables and Molly in Ghost. In 2013, she swept the rookie awards two musical awards, the Korean Musical Awards and The Musical Awards for her role Eponine in Les Miserables. Park was called a rising star in the musical world.

Park's television debut was on tvN's Oh My Ghost (2015). After that, she played Kang Eun-ju in KBS2's Mad Dog (2017) and Oh Jung-soo in KBS2's Andante (2017).

After eight years as musical actress, Park made her theatrical debut in the National Theater of Korea production of Shakespeare's Richard III, for which she received favorable reviews. Production started in February 2018 and ended in early-March of that year. After that, she acted as Yoon Hoon (Kim Hye-eun) in tvN historical drama series Mr. Sunshine (2018) and followed by the role of nurse Lee So-jung in JTBC's Life (2018). In winter of 2018, Park was back to musical. She was selected for the role helper-bot Claire in 2018 revival of musical Maybe Happy Ending. Directed by Kim Dong-yeon, it was performed in Vivaldi Park Hall, Daemyung Cultural Factory Building 1, Seoul from November 13, 2018, to February 10, 2019.

In 2019, Park acted as the role of Cho-hong in SBS historical drama Haechi. The role of Park Ji-young then followed – a role with different personalities in two parallel universes in the tvN drama The King: Eternal Monarch. Later, Park reunited with director Kim Dong-yeon in the 2019 Korean revival of musical Cyrano.

== Filmography ==
=== Television series ===
Television series appearances
| Year | Title | Role | Notes | Ref. |
|---|---|---|---|---|
| 2015 | Oh My Ghost | Il Pal-gwi | Ghost | |
| 2016 | Andante | Oh Jung-soo | | |
| 2016 | Mad Dog | Kang Eun-joo | | |
| 2018 | Life | Lee So-jeong | | |
| 2018 | Mr. Sunshine | Yoon Ho-ho (Kim Hye-eun) | | |
| 2019 | Haechi | Cho-hong | | |
| 2019 | The King: Eternal Monarch | Park Ji-young | | |
| 2021 | Stranger | Jung Min-ha | Cameo (Season 2; Episode 9) | |
| 2021 | Hospital Playlist | Yoon Shin-hye | Season 2 | |
| 2022 | Bloody Heart | Yoo Jeong | | |
| 2024 | Your Honor | Jang Chae-rim | | |

=== Web series ===
Web series appearances
| Year | Title | Role | Ref. |
|---|---|---|---|
| 2022 | A Model Family | Kwang-cheol | |
| 2024 | Blood Free | Jeong Hae-deun | |

=== Television shows ===
Television shows appearances
| Year | Title | Role | Notes | Ref. |
|---|---|---|---|---|
| 2014 | KBS2 A Song For You (리차드3세) | Singer | January 4, 2014 (Episode 15) | |
| 2015 | EBS Space Empathy Musical Once | Singer | | |

=== Music video appearances ===
| Year | Song title | Artist | Ref. |
|---|---|---|---|
| 2016 | "Go Home" (집으로...) | Park Joon-myeon | |

== Stage ==
=== Concert ===
Musical concert performances
| Year | Title | Role | Theater | Date | Ref. |
|---|---|---|---|---|---|
| 2014 | Musical gala concert (뮤지컬 갈라 콘서트) | Singer | Sungkyunkwan University 600th Anniversary Millennium Hall | July 15, 2014 | |
| 2014 | Samsung Card Stage 2 (삼성카드 스테이지 2) | Singer | Blue Square Master Card Hall | September 26, 2014 | |
| 2018 | Ko Concert (코 콘서트) | Singer | Platform Changdong 61 Redbox | December 10, 2018 | |

=== Musical ===
Musical plays performances
| Year | Title | Role | Theater | Date | Ref. |
|---|---|---|---|---|---|
| 2010 | Mamma Mia! (맘마미아) | Sophie | Gyeonggi Icheon Art Hall | | |
| 2010 | Mamma Mia! (맘마미아) | Sophie | Busan Civic Center Grand Theater | May 15 – June 6 | |
| 2011–2012 | Mamma Mia! (맘마미아) | Sophie | Daesung D-Cube Art Center | August 30 – February 26 | |
| 2012 | You're Beautiful (미남이시네요) | Go Mi-nam/Go Mi-nyeo | Sejong Center for the Performing Arts M Theater | August 7 – September 9 | |
| 2012 | Les Misérables (레미제라블) | Éponine | Poeun Art Hall, Yongin | November 3–25 | |
| 2012–2013 | Les Misérables (레미제라블) | Éponine | Daegu Keimyung Art Center | December 7 – January 20 | |
| 2013 | Les Misérables (레미제라블) | Éponine | Centum City Sohyang Theater Shinhan Card Hall | February 1 – March 3 | |
| 2013 | Les Misérables (레미제라블) | Éponine | Blue Square Shinhan Card Hall | April 6 – September 1 | |
| 2013 | Ghost (고스트) | Molly Jensen | Daesung D-Cube Art Center | November 24 – June 29 | |
| 2014 | Once (원스) | Girl | CJ Towol Theater, Seoul Arts Center | December 3 – March 29 | |
| 2015 | Woo Ji-won, Shim Geon-woo's Go-Go-Go Show (우지원, 심건우의 고고고쇼) | Herself | Culture and Arts Theater CT | May 11, 2015 | |
| 2015 | Les Misérables (레미제라블) | Éponine | Daegu Keimyung Art Center | October 21 – November 15 | |
| 2016 | Mamma Mia! (맘마미아) | Sophie | Charlotte Theater | February 20 – June 4 | |
| 2017 | Arirang Showcase (아리랑 쇼케이스) | Bang Bang | Yes24 Live Hall | July 3 | |
| 2017 | Arirang (아리랑) | Bang Bang | Opera House, Seoul Arts Center | July 25 – September 3 | |
| 2017 | The Gift of December (12월의 선물) | 2 roles | Lotte Concert Hall | December 24–25 | |
| 2018 | Maybe Happy Ending (어쩌면 해피엔딩) | Claire | Yes24 Stage 1 | November 3 – February 10 | |
| 2019 | Cyrano (시라노) | Roxanne | Kwangrim Art Center BBCH Hall | August 10 – October 13 | |
| 2019–2020 | Rebecca (레베카) | I | Chungmu Arts Center Grand Theater | November 16 – March 15 | |
| 2020–2021 | Ghost (고스트) | Molly Jensen | Daesung D-Cube Art Center | October 6 – March 14 | |
| 2021 | Dracula (드라큘라) | Mina | Blue Square Shinhan Card Hall | May 20 – August 1 | |
| 2021–2022 | Rebecca (레베카) | I | Chungmu Arts Center Grand Theater | November 16 – February 28 | |
| 2023–2024 | Il Tenore (일 테노레) | Seo Jin-yeon | Seoul Arts Centre CJ Towol Theatre | December 19 – February 25 | |
| 2024 | Il Tenore (일 테노레) | Seo Jin-yeon | Blue Square Shinhan Card Hall | March 29 – May 19 | |

=== Theater ===
Theater plays performances
| Year | Title | | Role | Theater | Date | Ref. |
| Year | English | Korean | Role | Theater | Date | Ref. |
|---|---|---|---|---|---|---|
| 2018 | Richard III | 리차드3세 | Ann | CJ Towol Theater, Seoul Arts Center | February 6 – March 4 | |
| 2022 | Hamlet | 햄릿 | Ophelia | National Theater Haeoreum Theater | July 13 – August 13 | |

== Discography ==
=== Singles ===
| Title | Year | Peak chart positions | Album |
| Title | Year | KOR | Album |
|---|---|---|---|
| "Another Day" (하루 또 하루) with Shin Sung-rok | 2010 | — | Musical Rebecca 2019 cast recording |
"—" denotes releases that did not chart or were not released in that region.

== Awards and nominations ==
Award and nomination received
| Year | Award ceremony | Category | Nominee / Work | Result | Ref. |
|---|---|---|---|---|---|
| 2013 | 7th The Musical Awards | New Actress Award | Les Miserables | Won | |
| 2013 | 19th Korea Musical Awards | New Actress Award | Les Miserables | Won | |
| 2014 | 8th The Musical Awards | Best Actress Award | Ghost | Nominated | |
| 2020 | 5th Korea Musical Awards | Best Actress Award | Ghost | Nominated | |
| 2022 | KBS Drama Awards | Best Supporting Actress in a Miniseries | Bloody Heart | Won | |
