= Bloody Heart =

2022 South Korean television series

- Promotional poster
- Also known as: Red Single Heart
- Hangul: 붉은 단심
- Lit.: Red Heart
- RR: Bulgeun dansim
- MR: Pulgŭn tansim
- Genre: Historical drama; Romance
- Written by: Park Pil-joo
- Directed by: Yoo Young-eun
- Starring: Lee Joon; Kang Han-na; Jang Hyuk; Park Ji-yeon; Heo Sung-tae; Choi Ri
- Music by: Choi In-hee
- Country of origin: South Korea
- Original language: Korean
- No. of episodes: 16

Production
- Executive producer: Kim Sang-hui (KBS)
- Producers: Oh Seong-min; Kwak Hong-seok; Kim Chu-seok
- Running time: 70 minutes
- Production company: GnG Production

Original release
- Network: KBS2
- Release: May 2 – June 21, 2022

Bloody Heart (Korean: 붉은 단심; RR: Bulgeun dansim) is a 2022 South Korean television series starring Lee Joon, Kang Han-na, Jang Hyuk, Park Ji-yeon, Heo Sung-tae, and Choi Ri. It aired on KBS2 from May 2 to June 21, 2022, every Monday and Tuesday at 21:30 (KST) for 16 episodes. It is also available for streaming on Disney+ in selected regions.

== Synopsis ==
Bloody Heart is a fictional historical drama about King Seonjong who ascends to the throne due to a rebellion, and Lee Tae who becomes the king after him.

It follows the story of Lee Tae—a king who has to abandon the woman he loves to survive, Yoo Jeong—a woman who has to become the queen to survive, and Park Gye-won—the first vice-premier and the real head of power in Joseon.

== Cast ==
=== Main ===
- Lee Joon as Lee Tae
  - Park Ji-bin as young Lee Tae

He becomes the King of Joseon after King Seonjong. He dreams of absolute monarchy and becoming a powerful ruler, unlike his father. He believes any action is justifiable to achieve his goal.

- Kang Han-na as Yoo Jeong
  - Shin Eun-soo as young Yoo Jeong

A free-spirited woman whom Lee Tae falls in love with. Lee Tae picks her as his crown princess and she gets tangled up in the battle for power, which leads to a crisis in her family.

- Jang Hyuk as Park Gye-won (Note: Park Gye-won is loosely based on historical figure Park Won-jong, who led the Jungjong coup that brought King Jungjong to the throne.)

The first vice-premier who is a living symbol of power and a figure that everyone obeys. He is a "king maker" who is determined to create a wise and benevolent king, in order not to shake the foundations of Joseon by a tyrant ever again.

- Park Ji-yeon as Choi Ga-yeon

King Seonjong's Queen Consort whose first love is Park Gye-won.

- Heo Sung-tae as Jo Won-pyo

Minister of War whose ambitions are blocked by Park Gye-won.

- Choi Ri as Jo Yeon-hee

Jo Won-pyo's daughter who is immature and arrogant.

=== Supporting ===
==== People around Lee Tae ====
- Ha Do-kwon as Jung Eui-kyun
- Ahn Nae-sang as King Seonjong
- Woo Mi-hwa as Queen Inyeong

==== People around Yoo Jeong ====
- Yoon Seo-ah as Ddong-geum
- Park Sung-yeon as Court Lady Choi
- Ryu Seung-soo as Im Jin-sa
- Jo Hee-bong as Ma Seo-bang
- Kim Sun-hwa as Ma Seo-bang's wife

==== People around Park Gye-won ====
- Lee Tae-ri as Park Nam-sang
- Seo Yoo-jung as Madam Yoon
- Jung Young-sub as Park Song-baek

==== Others ====
- Kang Shin-il as Kim Chi-won
- Cha Soon-bae as Heo Sang-seon
- Jo Young-hoon as Jo Sa-hyung
- Park Ji-a as Court Lady Han
- Lee Seon-hee as Court Lady Kim
- Lee Seung-hoon as Noh Kyung-moon
- Go Geon-han as Kim Do-ryung
- Oh Seung-hoon as Hye Kang
- Kang Yeo-jung as Eum Jeon

=== Extended ===
- Lee Chang-jik as Minister of Interior
- Seo Hye-won as Hyang-yi

=== Special appearance ===
- Hahm Eun-jung as Yoon Jung-jeon

== Production ==
Filming locations of the series include Yeongwol County, and Yeolhwajeong Pavilion—located in Ganggol Village, Deungnyang-myeon, Boseong County.

On February 3, 2022, it was announced that filming was canceled for that day after a staff and an unnamed actor tested positive for COVID-19. All production crew members subsequently underwent PCR test. A day later, it was revealed that Park Ji-yeon and Yoon Seo-ah tested positive for COVID-19.

On February 11, 2022, it was confirmed that actor Heo Sung-tae also tested positive for COVID-19, forcing filming to be canceled for that day. Later on February 16, Heo fully recovered from the contagion and resumed his filming schedules.

On March 11, 2022, Ha Do-kwon's agency announced that the actor tested positive for COVID-19 on the afternoon of the 10th, and all his filming schedules were cancelled.

== Original soundtrack ==
=== Part 1 ===
Released on May 3, 2022
| No. | Title | Lyrics | Music | Artist | Length |
|---|---|---|---|---|---|
| 1. | "Dimly" (아스라이) | Choi In-young | Choi In-young | Rio | 3:32 |
| 2. | "Dimly" (아스라이; Inst.) | | Choi In-young | | 3:32 |
| Total length: | | | | | 7:04 |

=== Part 2 ===
Released on May 10, 2022
| No. | Title | Lyrics | Music | Artist | Length |
|---|---|---|---|---|---|
| 1. | "Wish Becomes Stars" (소망은 별이 되어) | Kebee | Tenzo (Papermaker); Loogone | Kim Yeon-woo | 4:18 |
| 2. | "Wish Becomes Stars" (소망은 별이 되어; Inst.) | | Tenzo (Papermaker); Loogone | | 4:18 |
| Total length: | | | | | 8:36 |

=== Part 3 ===
Released on May 17, 2022
| No. | Title | Lyrics | Music | Artist | Length |
|---|---|---|---|---|---|
| 1. | "It's Red" (feat. Dawool Park) | Kim Min | Kim Min; Taylor | ID:Earth | 3:39 |
| 2. | "It's Red" (Inst.) | | Kim Min; Taylor | | 3:39 |
| Total length: | | | | | 7:18 |

=== Part 4 ===
Released on May 23, 2022
| No. | Title | Lyrics | Music | Artist | Length |
|---|---|---|---|---|---|
| 1. | "A Star in the Dawn" (새벽에 핀 별 하나) | Yoo Song-yeon; Jay Lee | Yoo Song-yeon; Jay Lee | Chungha | 3:33 |
| 2. | "A Star in the Dawn" (새벽에 핀 별 하나; Inst.) | | Yoo Song-yeon; Jay Lee | | 3:33 |
| Total length: | | | | | 7:06 |

=== Part 5 ===
Released on May 31, 2022
| No. | Title | Lyrics | Music | Artist | Length |
|---|---|---|---|---|---|
| 1. | "Let It Flow" (흘려보낸다) | Kim Seong-yoon | Kim Seong-yoon | Lim Sang-hyun | 3:28 |
| 2. | "Let It Flow" (흘려보낸다; Inst.) | | Kim Seong-yoon | | 3:28 |
| Total length: | | | | | 6:56 |

=== Part 6 ===
Released on June 7, 2022
| No. | Title | Lyrics | Music | Artist | Length |
|---|---|---|---|---|---|
| 1. | "Missing You" (그리워서) | Friday | Athena (Galactika); E.Na (Galactika) | Han Dong-geun | 3:40 |
| 2. | "Missing You" (그리워서; Inst.) | | Athena (Galactika); E.Na (Galactika) | | 3:40 |
| Total length: | | | | | 7:20 |

== Viewership ==
Bloody Heart : South Korea viewers per episode (thousands)

| Season | Episode number | | | | | | | | | | | | | | | | Average |
| Season | 1 | 2 | 3 | 4 | 5 | 6 | 7 | 8 | 9 | 10 | 11 | 12 | 13 | 14 | 15 | 16 | Average |
|---|---|---|---|---|---|---|---|---|---|---|---|---|---|---|---|---|---|
| 1 | 1041 | 998 | 863 | 992 | 961 | 1111 | 902 | 1074 | 896 | 955 | 1001 | 1071 | 1237 | 1398 | 1171 | 1398 | 1067 |

Source: Audience measurement performed nationwide by Nielsen Korea.

Average TV viewership ratings
| Ep. | Original broadcast date | Average audience share | | |
| Ep. | Original broadcast date | Nielsen Korea | | TNmS |
| Ep. | Original broadcast date | Nationwide | Seoul | Nationwide |
|---|---|---|---|---|
| 1 | May 2, 2022 | 6.3% (10th) | 6.4% (6th) | 5.3% (13th) |
| 2 | May 3, 2022 | 6.0% (8th) | 6.0% (7th) | 4.8% (12th) |
| 3 | May 9, 2022 | 5.3% (9th) | 4.8% (13th) | 3.9% (16th) |
| 4 | May 10, 2022 | 5.6% (8th) | 5.2% (10th) | 4.5% (14th) |
| 5 | May 16, 2022 | 5.8% (10th) | 5.1% (13th) | 4.6% (14th) |
| 6 | May 17, 2022 | 6.4% (8th) | 5.7% (9th) | 5.3% (10th) |
| 7 | May 23, 2022 | 5.5% (12th) | 5.0% (13th) | 4.6% (15th) |
| 8 | May 24, 2022 | 6.6% (7th) | 5.9% (7th) | 5.3% (10th) |
| 9 | May 30, 2022 | 5.7% (13th) | 4.9% (14th) | 4.5% (16th) |
| 10 | May 31, 2022 | 6.3% (7th) | 5.5% (7th) | 5.1% (10th) |
| 11 | June 6, 2022 | 6.1% (10th) | 5.6% (8th) | 5.3% (14th) |
| 12 | June 7, 2022 | 7.3% (5th) | 6.7% (5th) | 6.1% (9th) |
| 13 | June 13, 2022 | 8.0% (5th) | 7.1% (5th) | 5.8% (11th) |
| 14 | June 14, 2022 | 8.9% (4th) | 8.3% (3rd) | 6.6% (9th) |
| 15 | June 20, 2022 | 7.7% (6th) | 7.1% (5th) | 5.5% (11th) |
| 16 | June 21, 2022 | 8.9% (4th) | 8.6% (4th) | 6.6% (8th) |
| Average | | 6.65% | 6.12% | 5.24% |
In the table above, the blue numbers represent the lowest ratings and the red numbers represent the highest ratings.

== Awards and nominations ==
Name of the award ceremony, year presented, category, nominee of the award, and the result of the nomination
| Award ceremony | Year | Category | Nominee | Result | Ref. |
|---|---|---|---|---|---|
| KBS Drama Awards | 2022 | Best Couple | Kang Han-na and Lee Joon | Won | |
| KBS Drama Awards | 2022 | Excellence Award, Actress in a Miniseries | Kang Han-na | Won | |
| KBS Drama Awards | 2022 | Top Excellence Award, Actress | Kang Han-na | Nominated | |
| KBS Drama Awards | 2022 | Excellence Award, Actor in a Miniseries | Lee Joon | Won | |
| KBS Drama Awards | 2022 | Popularity Award, Actor | Lee Joon | Nominated | |
| KBS Drama Awards | 2022 | Best Supporting Actress in a Miniseries | Park Ji-yeon | Won | |
