= Not Others =

2023 South Korean television series

- Promotional poster
- Hangul: 남남
- Lit.: Strangers
- RR: Namnam
- MR: Namnam
- Genre: Comedy drama; Family
- Based on: Strangers by Jung Young-rong
- Written by: Min Seon-ae
- Directed by: Lee Min-woo
- Starring: Jeon Hye-jin; Choi Soo-young; Ahn Jae-wook; Park Sung-hoon
- Music by: Park Se-joon
- Country of origin: South Korea
- Original language: Korean
- No. of episodes: 12

Production
- Executive producers: Choi Han-gyeol (CP); Kim Eun-ji
- Producers: Woo Ji-hee; Jung Gwi-jeong; Ahn Chang-hyun; Park Ho-sik
- Running time: 60 minutes
- Production companies: Arc Media; Baram Pictures

Original release
- Network: ENA
- Release: July 17 – August 22, 2023

Not Others (Korean: 남남) is a 2023 South Korean television series starring Jeon Hye-jin, Choi Soo-young, Ahn Jae-wook, and Park Sung-hoon. It is based on a webtoon of the same Korean title, which was serialized on Kakao Webtoon from 2019 to 2022. It is an original drama of Genie TV, and is available for streaming on its platform, as well as on TVING in South Korea, and on Viki in selected regions. It also aired on ENA from July 17 to August 22, 2023 every Monday and Tuesday at 22:00 (KST). A second season is scheduled to be release in 2025.

== Synopsis ==
The series tells the story of a careless and childish single mother and her cool-headed daughter living together without countermeasures, often acting more as sisters than a mother-daughter relationship.

== Cast and characters ==
=== Main ===
- Jeon Hye-jin as Kim Eun-mi: a physical therapist and a single mother who had her daughter, Jin-hee when she was in high school. Carefree and childish, she would often act more as a rebellious teenager than being a mother.
  - Park E-hyun as young Kim Eun-mi
- Choi Soo-young as Kim Jin-hee / Park Jin-hee: Eun-mi's 29-year-old daughter who is a patrol team leader at a local police station. Cool-headed, she often acts as the pillar of clear emotions of the family and the mother role more than her own mother, often keeping her in check.
  - Yoon Chae-na as young Kim Jin-hee
- Ahn Jae-wook as Park Jin-hong: a mysterious otolaryngologist who has timid yet pure personality. Ex-boyfriend who abandoned Eun-mi and the actual father of Jin-hee.
- Park Sung-hoon as Eun Jae-won: director of Namchon Police Station.

=== Supporting ===
==== People in the Department of Orthopedics ====
- Kim Sang-ho as Park Sang-goo: director of the department.
- as Lee Kang-suk
- as Jung Eun-shim
- as Sung Ae-ja

==== People in the police station ====
- Ahn So-yo as Jang Soo-jin: an assistant inspector.
- Kim Dong-soo as Cha Soon-cheol

==== Others ====
- Kim Hye-eun as Kim Mi-jeong: Eun-mi's best friend and godmother of Jin-hee. Supports both of them with whatever they do and acts more of an actual sister to Eun-mi.
- Lim Sung-kyun as Kim Jin-soo: a travel writer who is Jin-hee's childhood friend and first love.
- Seo Ye-hwa as Im Tae-kyung: Jin-hee's best friend who also works as a police officer as Jin-hee.

=== Extended ===
- Kim Ji-in as Lee Na-gyun
- Cho Yoon-woo as Min-gi
- Yoon Seok-hyun as Oh Young-min
- Yu Bee as Jo Young-gyo
- Son So-mang as Jung Do-hee: a nurse.
- Choi Woo-jung as Choi Seon-jung
- Kim Se-won as Gong Ga-eul: a high school student.
- Kim Sun-bin as Baek Geon: Ga-eul's boyfriend who is a responsible and reliable person.
- Kim Joon-kyung

== Production ==
Filming of the series had completed by March 2023.

== Viewership ==
Not Others : South Korea viewers per episode (thousands)

Season	Episode number											
Season	1	2	3	4	5	6	7	8	9	10	11	12
1	N/A	387	522	572	667	767	886	866	891	1037	1005	1141

Source: Audience measurement performed nationwide by Nielsen Korea.

Average TV viewership ratings
Ep.	Original broadcast date	Average audience share (Nielsen Korea)	
Ep.	Original broadcast date	Nationwide	Seoul
1	July 17, 2023	1.266% (24th)	1.258% (8th)
2	July 18, 2023	1.611% (5th)	1.687% (3rd)
3	July 24, 2023	2.479% (1st)	2.804% (1st)
4	July 25, 2023	2.747% (2nd)	3.163% (2nd)
5	July 31, 2023	2.886% (1st)	3.252% (1st)
6	August 1, 2023	3.623% (1st)	3.950% (2nd)
7	August 7, 2023	3.873% (1st)	4.774% (1st)
8	August 8, 2023	3.910% (1st)	4.452% (1st)
9	August 14, 2023	4.527% (1st)	5.536% (1st)
10	August 15, 2023	4.401% (1st)	4.762% (1st)
11	August 21, 2023	4.683% (1st)	5.191% (1st)
12	August 22, 2023	5.532% (1st)	6.484% (1st)
Average		3.462%	3.943%
In the table above, the blue numbers represent the lowest ratings and the red numbers represent the highest ratings.; This series aired on a cable channel/pay TV which normally has a relatively smaller audience compared to free-to-air TV/public broadcasters (KBS, SBS, MBC and EBS).

== Accolades ==
Name of the award ceremony, year presented, category, nominee of the award, and the result of the nomination
Award ceremony	Year	Category	Nominee	Result	Ref.
Asia Contents Awards & Global OTT Awards	2023	Best Asian TV Series	Not Others	Nominated	
