= Son Yeo-eun =

South Korean actress (born 1983)

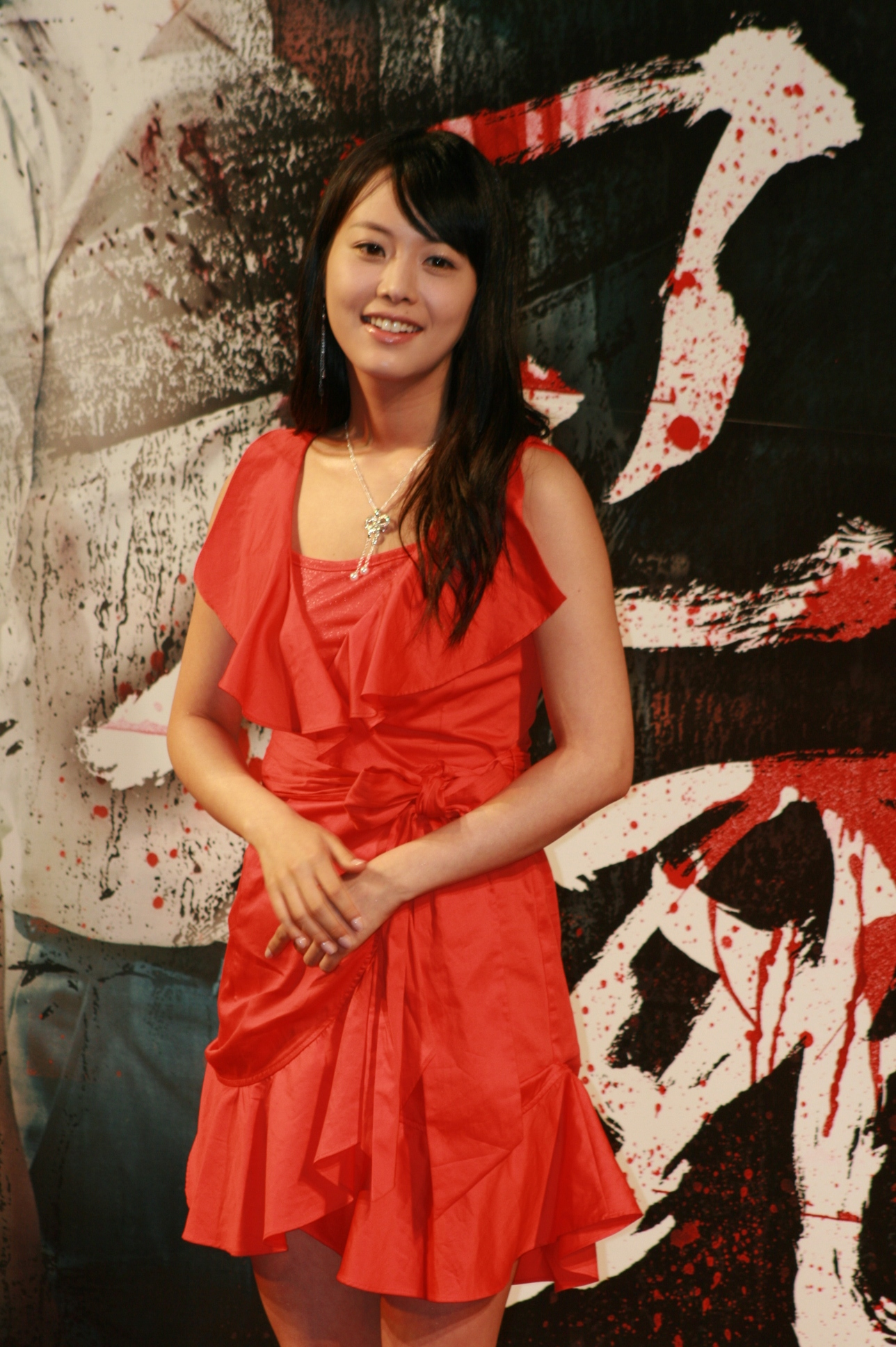
- Son in 2008
- Born: Byun Na-yeon; August 4, 1983 (age 43); Busan, South Korea
- Education: Dong-a University – Piano
- Occupation: Actress
- Years active: 2003–present
- Agent(s): J,Wide-Company

Korean name
- Hangul: 변나연
- RR: Byeon Nayeon
- MR: Pyŏn Nayŏn

Stage name
- Hangul: 손여은
- Hanja: 孫汝恩
- RR: Son Yeoeun
- MR: Son Yŏŭn

Son Yeo-eun (Korean: 손여은; born August 4, 1983), birth name Byeon Na-yeon, is a South Korean actress. Son was nominated for Best New Actress for Television at the Baeksang Arts Awards for her portrayal of a villain in Thrice Married Woman (2013).

== Filmography ==
=== Film ===
Year	Title	Role	Notes/Ref.
2005	Wet Dreams 2	2nd year class 3 student	
2005	She's on Duty	Student	
2008	Death Bell	Yoon Myung-hyo	
2012	I Go Through the Summer		Short film
2015	Coin Locker	Yeon	
2015	The Trip Around the World	Young-sook	
2017	The Sheriff In Town	Hee-soon	
2018	Be With You	Hyun-jung	Cameo
2023	The Devil's Deal	Sang-mi	
TBA	Nineteen, Thirty-Nine	Kim Soo-jin	

=== Television series ===
Year	Title	Role	Notes/Ref.
2004	Match Made in Heaven	Nam Jung-ran	
2005	Single Again	Lee Yoon-hee	
2007	HDTV Literature: "Castella"	Mi-ryung	
2007	Dear Lover	Cha Myung-soon	
2007	Ground Zero	Han Soo-jin	
2007	Drama City: "In Tunnel"	Han Ji-yeon	
2007	Drama City: "Watch for the Angel!"	Eun-ok	
2007	New Heart	Choi Hyun-jung	
2009	Brilliant Legacy	Jung In-young	
2009	Dream	Son Yeo-jin	
2009	High Kick Through the Roof	Son Yeo-eun	Cameo, Episode 2
2010	KBS Drama Special: "Summer Story"	Lee Kyung-ah	
2012	Bridal Mask	Um Sun-hwa	
2012	Dream of the Emperor	Princess Seungman	
2013	Hur Jun, The Original Story	So-hyun	
2013	Thrice Married Woman	Han Chae-rin	
2015	All About My Mom	Sun Hye-joo	
2016	The Master of Revenge	Do Hyun-jung	
2016	KBS Drama Special: "Home Sweet Home"	Yoon Se-jung	
2017	Innocent Defendant	Yoon Ji-soo	
2017	Band of Sisters	Gu Se-kyung	
2018	Suits	Kim Moon-hee	
2018	Bad Papa	Choi Sun-joo	
2020	The Uncanny Counter	Ha Mun-yeong	Cameo
2021	The Road: The Tragedy of One	Lee Mi-do	Cameo
2021	The King's Affection	Queen	
2022	The Golden Spoon	Seo Young-shin	
2024	No Way Out: The Roulette	Ye-eun	
2026	Spring Fever	Seon Hee-yeon	
2026	Phantom Lawyer	Shin Sa-rang	

== Awards and nominations ==
Year	Award	Category	Nominated work	Result
2007	KBS Drama Awards	Best Actress in a One-Act/Special/Short Drama	Watch for the Angel!, Castella	Nominated
2014	50th Baeksang Arts Awards	Best New Actress – Television	Thrice Married Woman	Nominated
2015	KBS Drama Awards	Best Supporting Actress	All About My Mom	Nominated
2016	KBS Drama Awards	Best Actress in a One-Act/Special/Short Drama	Drama Special – Home Sweet Home	Nominated
2017	SBS Drama Awards	Excellence Award, Actress in a Daily/Weekend Drama	Band of Sisters	Won
2018	MBC Drama Awards	Top Excellence Award, Actress in a Monday-Tuesday Miniseries	Bad Papa	Nominated
2022	MBC Drama Awards	Best Supporting Actress	The Golden Spoon	Nominated
