= Pandora (film) =

2016 South Korean disaster film

- Theatrical release poster
- Hangul: 판도라
- RR: Pandora
- MR: P'andora
- Directed by: Park Jung-woo
- Written by: Park Jung-woo
- Produced by: Kim Chul-yong; Park Kyung-sook
- Starring: Kim Nam-gil
- Cinematography: Choi Young-hwan
- Edited by: Park Gok-ji
- Music by: Jo Yeong-wook
- Production company: CAC Entertainment
- Distributed by: Next Entertainment World
- Release date: December 7, 2016
- Running time: 136 minutes
- Country: South Korea
- Language: Korean
- Budget: ₩530 million (US$477,000) (est.)
- Box office: US$32 million

Pandora (Korean: 판도라) is a 2016 South Korean disaster film written and directed by Park Jung-woo, starring Kim Nam-gil. The film was released in South Korea on December 7, 2016.

== Plot ==
Kang Jae-hyeok works at the aging Hanbyul Nuclear Power Plant, which is their namesake town's only source of energy and jobs. Jae-hyeok, who had earlier lost both his father and brother working at the plant in his early years, lives with his mother, sister-in-law, and nephew Min-jae. He expresses his desire to work at a fishing vessel to make money for his family rather than work at the plant, but is discouraged by everyone he knows, including his childhood friend & fiancée Yeon-joo.

Pyeong-seok is one of the head operators of the plant, who alongside a coalition of his concerned plant workers and anti-nuclear activists, tries to get the President of South Korea Seok-ko Hang, to shut down the plant due to urgent safety concerns, but they are dismissed by the other senior plant operators, especially the Prime Minister. An earthquake suddenly strikes the town, causing the nuclear reactor to overheat. Due to the plant's aging safety systems, attempts to cool down the overheating reactor are ineffective.

Meanwhile, Hang's administration fiercely debates between allowing the reactor to vent radioactive particles into the air to relieve pressure from the core or evacuating large population centers around the plant, before they settle on evacuating residents closest to the reactor. Due to the lack of a contingency plan in place, the only route leading out of town quickly became gridlocked. This critical delay led to the reactor building exploding before the crew could open the pressure release valves themselves, killing or injuring most of the plant workers. Jae-hyeok hauls out his friend Gil-seop and much of the workers out from the plant before he collapses from radiation poisoning.

The KCDC quarantines the town's residents not far from the reactor. However. after Yeon-joo gets proof that the reactor exploded and delivers the news, they set up a jammer and locks the evacuees inside the evacuation center as they leave them for dead, except for the junior nurse Mi-sook, who is treating Jae-hyeok and other plant workers. Yeon-joo, along with the town's residents manage to break out from the evacuation center and commandeers one of the buses for their citizens to escape.

Despite the firefighters' efforts to cool the reactors, some of the firefighting crew also began experiencing radiation poisoning symptoms as well. Hang, after fallen into depression for the reactor explosion, orders the firefighters to use seawater to decommission the reactors completely. He and Pyeong-seok discovers that there is a growing crack underneath the storage tank in the basement, putting the spent fuel rods in danger of overheating. When the Army's military engineers refuse to step in, Hang addresses to the nation, requesting aid from the plant workers to perform a dangerous operation of sealing the cracks in the basement.

Jae-hyeok, resentful for the government's negligence, reluctantly agrees for the sake of their loved ones and at the insistence of Gil-seop. He calls a distraught Yeon-joo before he boards on a bus back to the town along with their surviving crew. During their operation, the crack underneath the coolant tank grew bigger and they are ordered to retreat. Jae-hyeok suggests they seal the door and blow up the tank to allow the spent fuel rods to fall into the basement, effectively creating a new tank.

However, at the current situation, both of these steps must be executed simultaneously, meaning one will not be leaving out alive. Jae-hyeok, the only person among the group who can operate explosives and having already been too sick from radiation poisoning, volunteers to sacrifice himself, allowing the workers to then seal himself into the waste room before fleeing the area. Jae-hyeok uses his helmet-mounted camera to broadcast a farewell message to his family and Yeon-joo before blowing himself up, sending all the fuel rods into the flooded basement and averting a larger nuclear disaster.

== Cast ==
- Kim Nam-gil as Kang Jae-hyeok, the childish protagonist, who works at the nuclear power plant
- Kim Young-ae as Mrs. Seok- the mother of Jae-Hyeok, who owns a restaurant and lost her husband and other son to a similar accident.
- Moon Jeong-hee as Jung-hye, Jae hyeok's sister in law and a widow who lost her husband (Jae hyeok's brother).
- Jung Jin-young as Pyeong-seok, one of the heads of the plant, who grows more concerned about safety of the plant
- Lee Geung-young as Prime Minister
- Kim Dae-myung as Gil-seop, one of Jae Hyeok's friends, who aids Jae Hyeok in the nuclear mission
- Kang Shin-il as Mr. Kong, a grumpy old nuclear power plant worker and father of Gil-seop
- Yoo Seung-mok as Mr. Kam- the other power plant head, who suspects something is off about the plant
- Kim Ju-hyeon as Yeon-joo, Jae-hyeok's fiance, who works as a tour guide at the power plant. She is also Jae-hyeok's childhood friend.
- Joo Jin-mo as Minister
- Song Yeong-chang as New Director
- Kim Young-woong as Mr. Hwang
- Kim Myung-min as South Korean President Seok-ko Hang
- Kim Hye-eun as First Lady
- Oh Ye-sul as Mi-sook, a junior nurse

== Release ==
Pandora was the first Korean film to be pre-sold to Netflix. In November 2016, three weeks before the theatrical release, the company acquired exclusive international rights for streaming Pandora in 190 countries. The film was inspired by the Fukushima nuclear accident.

== Awards and nominations ==
Year	Award	Category	Recipient	Result
2017	11th Asian Film Awards	Best Production Designer	Kang Seung-yong	Nominated
2017	22nd Chunsa Film Art Awards	Best New Actress	Kim Ju-hyeon	Nominated
2017	53rd Baeksang Arts Awards	Most Popular Actor (film)	Kim Nam-gil	Nominated
2017	54th Grand Bell Awards	Best Film	Pandora	Nominated
2017	54th Grand Bell Awards	Best Director	Park Jung-woo	Nominated
2017	54th Grand Bell Awards	Best Supporting Actress	Kim Young-ae	Nominated
2017	54th Grand Bell Awards	Best Supporting Actor	Jung Jin-young	Nominated
2017	54th Grand Bell Awards	Best Art Direction	Kang Seung-yong	Nominated
2017	54th Grand Bell Awards	Best Lighting	Kim Ho-seong	Nominated
2017	54th Grand Bell Awards	Best Cinematography	Choi Young-hwan	Nominated
2017	54th Grand Bell Awards	Best Editing	Park Gok-ji	Nominated
2017	54th Grand Bell Awards	Technical Award	Pandora	Nominated
2017	54th Grand Bell Awards	Best Planning	Pandora	Nominated

== See also ==
- Fukushima 50
