= Bad Papa =

2018 South Korean television series

- Promotional poster. From left: Jang Hyuk, Shin Eun-soo, Son Yeo-eun
- Hangul: 배드파파
- RR: Baedeupapa
- MR: Paedŭp'ap'a
- Genre: Family; Drama; Sport
- Created by: Son Hyung-suk
- Written by: Kim Sung-min
- Directed by: Jin Chang-gyu
- Starring: Jang Hyuk; Son Yeo-eun; Shin Eun-soo
- Country of origin: South Korea
- Original language: Korean
- No. of episodes: 32 (Note: In order to circumvent Korean laws that prevent commercial breaks in the middle of an episode, what would previously have been aired as single 70 minute episodes are now being repackaged as two 35 minute episodes, with two episodes being shown each night with a commercial break between the two.)

Production
- Executive producers: Kathy Jung-ah Kim; Kwon Yong-han
- Running time: 35 minutes
- Production companies: Hoga Entertainment; Signal Pictures (Note: A joint venture of Signal Entertainment Group and Gemini Investment)

Original release
- Network: MBC TV
- Release: October 1 – November 27, 2018

Bad Papa (Korean: 배드파파; RR: Baedeupapa) is a South Korean television series starring Jang Hyuk, Son Yeo-eun and Shin Eun-soo. It is about the struggles of a father who chooses to become a bad person in order to be a good dad. It aired on MBC's Mondays and Tuesdays at 22:00 (KST) from October 1 to November 27, 2018.

== Synopsis ==
Ji-cheol is an incompetent husband and dad. He was a detective who got suspended for allegedly taking a bribe. He can't come up with their living expenses, let alone the rent. On top of that, his daughter gets into trouble and he has to come up with the settlement money. Cornered, Ji-cheol makes a dangerous decision. Having been a boxing champion in the past, he decides to participate in an illegal boxing match and take the prize money.

== Cast ==
=== Main ===
- Jang Hyuk as Yoo Ji-cheol, Fallen father and fighter (43 years old)

Ji-cheol used to be an undefeated boxing champion in his 20s. He fell in love with Sun-joo at first sight, proposed to her in 3 days, and together they had a beautiful daughter named Young-sun. He was a national hero, beloved husband and respected father. However, during the 13th defense match against Min-woo, which was called the game of the century, he lost helplessly, which seemed weird, and the whole world criticized him. He lost money, reputation and the happiness of his family all at once. 11 years later, he suddenly gets an opportunity to make a comeback.

- Son Yeo-eun as Choi Sun-joo, Ji-cheol's wife, an erotic novelist and massage chair salesperson (37 years old)

She met Ji-cheol, a top sports star, when she just graduated high school. Ji-cheol proposes to her, leaving Min-woo, who has had a crush on her for 3 years without even a chance. She marries Ji-cheol and has a daughter named Young-sun. Life with a national hero is luxurious. However, 11 years later, her national hero husband has been long gone and she is only left with a hopeless man by her side.

- Shin Eun-soo as Yoo Young-sun, Y-NYANG dance YouTuber (17 years old)

Young-sun had a happy life as a rising ballerina. However, the year Young-sun turned 6, her dad's reputation plummeted for match fixing and everything changed. 17-year-old Young-sun doesn't study, dance and isn't enthusiastic about anything. However, there is one thing she is secretly passionate about. She uploads videos on Youtube that are very popular. Although she quit ballet, she couldn't do anything about her love for dancing. She posts videos under the identity "Cat Mask".

- Ha Jun as Lee Min-woo, MMA champion, sports superstar (37 years old)

He is currently number one in MMA middleweight rankings and very popular for his fighting skills. He is enjoying the golden age of his life. However, his family was poor as he was growing up, he was weak and had many scars. Sun-joo is the girl next door that was always by his side and helped him dream of becoming a boxer. He had a crush on her, but didn't even dream of telling her and ended up letting her marry Ji-cheol, the top sport superstar during that time.

- Kim Jae-kyung as Cha Ji-woo, Daughter of Dr. Cha, Ji-cheol's former partner, a regional investigation unit detective (32 years old)

She joined the team much later than Ji-cheol, but became the youngest female lieutenant and Ji-cheol's superior through several special promotions. Although everyone else looks down on Ji-cheol, Ji-woo likes him and is on his side. Not even she understands why, but she favors Ji-cheol. After Ji-cheol quits his job as a cop in shame, Ji-woo stumbles upon a mysterious case.

=== Supporting ===
==== Regional Investigation Unit ====
- Kim Byung-choon as Park Min-sik (47 years old)

Inspector of police investigation unit.

- Kim Wook as Lee Hyun-soo (35 years old)

Detective, colleague of Ji-woo.

==== Mixed Martial Arts ====
- Jung Man-sik as Joo Kook-sung (50 years old)

Mixed martial arts promoter who scouted Ji-cheol

- Lee David as Kim Yong-dae (26 years old)

3rd class martial arts coach, Ji-cheol's fan.

- Lee Jun-hyeok as Kim Pil-doo (39 years old)

Chief of illegal gambling fighting ring

- Jung Ik-han as Kim Jong-doo (32 years old)

Pil-doo's brother

- Jang Eui-soo as Sang Chul

An underground martial arts fighter.

==== Shingu Pharmaceutical ====
- Jung In-gi as Cha Seung-ho

Research professor, Ji-woo's father (60 years old)

- Park Ji-bin as Jung Chan-joong

CEO of Shingu Pharmaceutical (27 years old)

- Shin Woo-geum as Kim Dae-sung

Researcher and PhD assistant (33 years old)

- Lee Kyu-ho as Mr Park

Jung Chan-joong's bodyguard

==== Young-sun's high school ====
- Kwon Eun-bin as Kim Sang-ah (17 years old)

A rich student who considers Young-sun as her rival.

- Cho Yi-hyun as Kim Se-jung (17 years old)

Good friend of Young-sun.

- Yoon Seo-ah as Wang Hye-ji (17 years old)

Good friend of Young-sun.

- Lee Eun-saem as Lee Seul-ki (17 years old)

Good friend of Young-sun.

==== Others ====
- Yoon Bong-gil as Park Ji-hoon (35 years old)

Min-woo's business partner

- Choi Yoon-ra as Choi Sun-young (33 years old)

Sun-joo's sister

- Joo Jin-mo as Director Jang (60 years old)

Ji-cheol's former promoter and current owner of a small boxing ring

- Jung Sung-ho as boxing match commentator (guest appearance)
- Kim Si-eun as Choi Sun-joo
- Hong In as Yong Woo

Brain-tumour patient who took part in clinical trial

- Baek Eun-kyung

Sun-joo's colleague in departmental store

- Kim Seung-hyun as Kim Yoon Soo

Ji-cheol's friend who ran away after cheating him of his money

== Original soundtrack ==
=== Part 1 ===
Released on October 8, 2018
| No. | Title | Artist | Length |
|---|---|---|---|
| 1. | "Don't Remember" | Ha Dong-kyun | 03:49 |
| 2. | "Don't Remember" (Inst.) | | 03:49 |

=== Part 2 ===
Released on October 15, 2018
| No. | Title | Artist | Length |
|---|---|---|---|
| 1. | "Golden Goat" | Oh Hyuk | 03:43 |
| 2. | "Golden Goat" (Inst.) | | 03:43 |

=== Part 3 ===
Released on October 23, 2018
| No. | Title | Artist | Length |
|---|---|---|---|
| 1. | "기다려줘 Please wait for me" | Shin Jae | 04:23 |
| 2. | "기다려줘 Please wait for me" (Inst.) | | 04:23 |

=== Part 4 ===
Released on October 29, 2018
| No. | Title | Artist | Length |
|---|---|---|---|
| 1. | "Merry Go Round" | Kim Sin Ui | 03:17 |
| 2. | "Merry Go Round" (Inst.) | | 03:17 |

=== Part 5 ===
Released on November 5, 2018
| No. | Title | Artist | Length |
|---|---|---|---|
| 1. | "You Are" | Kim Bo-kyung | 03:42 |
| 2. | "You Are" (Inst.) | | 03:42 |

=== Part 6 ===
Released on November 27, 2018
| No. | Title | Artist | Length |
|---|---|---|---|
| 1. | "그대와 영원히 Forever with you" | Damsonegongbang | 04:30 |
| 2. | "그대와 영원히 Forever with you" (Inst.) | | 04:30 |

== Ratings ==
- In the table below, the blue numbers represent the lowest ratings and the red numbers represent the highest ratings.
- NR denotes that the drama did not rank in the top 20 daily programs on that date.
- N/A denotes that the rating is not known.

| Ep. | Original broadcast date | Title | Average audience share (Nationwide) | |
| Ep. | Original broadcast date | Title | TNmS | AGB Nielsen |
|---|---|---|---|---|
| 1 | October 1, 2018 | Badman or Hero | 3.7% | 3.1% (NR) |
| 2 | October 1, 2018 | Badman or Hero | 4.3% | 3.7% (NR) |
| 3 | October 2, 2018 | Family Man | —N/a | 3.4% (NR) |
| 4 | October 2, 2018 | Family Man | —N/a | 4.0% (NR) |
| 5 | October 8, 2018 | A Number for the Head of a Family | —N/a | 2.4% (NR) |
| 6 | October 8, 2018 | A Number for the Head of a Family | —N/a | 3.5% (NR) |
| 7 | October 9, 2018 | Re Action | 3.6% | 2.8% (NR) |
| 8 | October 9, 2018 | Re Action | 3.5% | 3.2% (NR) |
| 9 | October 15, 2018 | Just Dream | 2.2% | 2.6% (NR) |
| 10 | October 15, 2018 | Just Dream | 2.6% | 2.7% (NR) |
| 11 | October 15, 2018 | Medicine or Poison | 2.3% | 3.1% (NR) |
| 12 | October 15, 2018 | Medicine or Poison | 2.5% | 3.3% (NR) |
| 13 | October 22, 2018 | Gone Father | —N/a | 2.4% (NR) |
| 14 | October 22, 2018 | Gone Father | —N/a | 2.7% (NR) |
| 15 | October 29, 2018 | You Who Came Spilling Blood | —N/a | 1.9% (NR) |
| 16 | October 29, 2018 | You Who Came Spilling Blood | —N/a | 2.2% (NR) |
| 17 | November 6, 2018 | Arrival | —N/a | 2.8% (NR) |
| 18 | November 6, 2018 | Arrival | —N/a | 2.7% (NR) |
| 19 | November 6, 2018 | Warning | —N/a | 1.8% (NR) |
| 20 | November 6, 2018 | Warning | —N/a | 2.2% (NR) |
| 21 | November 12, 2018 | Necessary Evil | —N/a | 2.0% (NR) |
| 22 | November 12, 2018 | Necessary Evil | —N/a | 2.4% (NR) |
| 23 | November 13, 2018 | Zero-Sum | —N/a | 2.3% (NR) |
| 24 | November 13, 2018 | Zero-Sum | —N/a | 2.9% (NR) |
| 25 | November 19, 2018 | Replay | —N/a | 2.3% (NR) |
| 26 | November 19, 2018 | Replay | —N/a | 2.7% (NR) |
| 27 | November 20, 2018 | Last Dance | —N/a | 2.4% (NR) |
| 28 | November 20, 2018 | Last Dance | —N/a | 2.9% (NR) |
| 29 | November 26, 2018 | Last Girl | 2.3% | 2.0% (NR) |
| 30 | November 26, 2018 | Last Girl | 2.6% | 2.3% (NR) |
| 31 | November 27, 2018 | Last Man | —N/a | 3.1% (NR) |
| 32 | November 27, 2018 | Last Man | —N/a | 3.9% (NR) |
| Average | | | - | 2.74% |

- 4 Episodes aired back-to-back on October 15 and November 6.
- No episodes on October 16, 23, 30 and November 5 due to the broadcast of KBO League baseball games.

== Awards and nominations ==
| Year | Award | Category | Recipient | Result | Ref. |
|---|---|---|---|---|---|
| 2018 | 31st Grimae Awards | Best Drama | Kim Hwa-young, Park Chang-soo | Won | |
| 2018 | 31st Grimae Awards | Best Actor | Jang Hyuk | Won | |
| 2018 | 2018 MBC Drama Awards | Top Excellence Award, Actor in a Monday-Tuesday Miniseries | Jang Hyuk | Nominated | |
| 2018 | 2018 MBC Drama Awards | Top Excellence Award, Actress in a Monday-Tuesday Miniseries | Son Yeo-eun | Nominated | |
| 2018 | 2018 MBC Drama Awards | Excellence Award, Actor in a Monday-Tuesday Miniseries | Ha Jun | Nominated | |
| 2018 | 2018 MBC Drama Awards | Best Supporting Actor/Actress in a Monday-Tuesday Miniseries | Kim Jae-kyung | Won | |
| 2018 | 2018 MBC Drama Awards | Best Supporting Actor/Actress in a Monday-Tuesday Miniseries | Lee David | Nominated | |
| 2018 | 2018 MBC Drama Awards | Best Supporting Actor/Actress in a Monday-Tuesday Miniseries | Park Ji-bin | Nominated | |
| 2018 | 2018 MBC Drama Awards | Best New Actor | Ha Jun | Nominated | |
| 2018 | 2018 MBC Drama Awards | Best Young Actress | Shin Eun-soo | Won | |
| 2018 | 2018 MBC Drama Awards | Vocal King Award | Jang Hyuk | Won | |

== International Broadcast ==
- Bad Papa aired in Taiwan on KKTV from 2 October 2018.
- Bad Papa aired in Singapore, Malaysia and Hong Kong on Oh!K TV Asia from 2 October 2018.
- Bad Papa aired in USA on Kocowa TV from 2 October 2018.
- Bad Papa aired in Japan on KNTV from 5 March 2019.
- Bad Papa aired in India on Playflix from 25 January 2021.
