= 54th Grand Bell Awards =

2017 edition of award ceremony

- Official poster
- Date: October 25, 2017
- Site: Sejong University Convention Center, Seoul

Television coverage
- Network: TV Chosun

The 54th Grand Bell Awards (Korean: 대종상 영화제; RR: Daejongsang Yeonghwajae), also known as Daejong Film Awards, are determined and presented annually by The Motion Pictures Association of Korea for excellence in film in South Korea. The Grand Bell Awards were first presented in 1962 and have gained prestige as the Korean equivalent of the American Academy Awards.

== Nominations and winners ==
Nominations were announced September 29, 2017.

Best Film	Best Director
A Taxi Driver; Anarchist from Colony; The King; The Merciless; Pandora	Lee Joon-ik - Anarchist from Colony; Han Jae-rim - The King; Byun Sung-hyun - The Merciless; Park Jung-woo - Pandora; Jang Hoon - A Taxi Driver
Best Actor	Best Actress
Sul Kyung-gu - The Merciless; Lee Je-hoon - Anarchist from Colony; Jo In-sung - The King; Han Suk-kyu - The Prison; Song Kang-ho - A Taxi Driver	Choi Hee-seo - Anarchist from Colony; Yum Jung-ah - The Mimic; Gong Hyo-jin - Missing; Chun Woo-hee - One Day; Kim Ok-vin - The Villainess
Best Supporting Actor	Best Supporting Actress
Bae Seong-woo - The King; Kim In-woo - Anarchist from Colony; Kwak Do-won - The Mayor; Kim Hee-won - The Merciless; Jung Jin-young - Pandora	Kim So-jin - The King; Moon So-ri - The Mayor; Jeon Hye-jin - The Merciless; Kim Hae-sook - New Trial; Kim Young-ae - Pandora
Best New Actor	Best New Actress
Park Seo-joon - Midnight Runners; Kim Jun-han - Anarchist from Colony; Choi Min-ho - Derailed; Min Jin-woong - New Trial; Byun Yo-han - Will You Be There?	Choi Hee-seo - Anarchist from Colony; Lim Yoona - Confidential Assignment; Oh Ye-seol - My Little Baby, Jaya; Shin Eun-soo - Vanishing Time: A Boy Who Returned; Lee Soo-kyung - Yongsoon
Best New Director	Best Screenplay
Um Tae-hwa - Vanishing Time: A Boy Who Returned; Jason Kim - Midnight Runners; Yang Kyung-mo - One Line; Na Hyun - The Prison; Shin Joon - Yongsoon	Han Jae-rim - The King; Hwang Seong-gu - Anarchist from Colony; Lee Eon-hee - Missing; Eom Yoon-na - A Taxi Driver; Um Tae-hwa and Jo Seul-yeah - Vanishing Time: A Boy Who Returned
Best Cinematography	Best Editing
Park Jung-hun - The Villainess; Kim Woo-hyeong - The King; Jo Hyeong-rae - The Merciless; Choi Young-Hwan - Pandora; Go Nak-seon -A Taxi Driver	Sin Min-kyeong - The King; Kim Sang-bum and Kim Jae-bum - The Merciless; Jeong Soo-jeong - Pandora; Kim Jae-geun - The Prison; Lee Hae-won - The Villainess
Best Art Direction	Best Lighting
Lee Jae-seong - Anarchist from Colony; Lee Na-gyeom - The King; Kang Seung-yong - Pandora; Kim Min-hye - A Taxi Driver; Kim Byeong-han - Warriors of the Dawn	Kim Jae-geun - The Prison; Kim Seung-gyoo - The King; Park Jeong-woo - The Merciless; Kim Ho-seong - Pandora; Lee Hae-won - The Villainess
Best Costume Design	Best Music
Sim Hyeon-seob - Anarchist from Colony; Cho Sang-kyung - The King; Sim Hyeon-seob - The King's Case Note; Cho Sang-kyung - A Taxi Driver; Kwon Yoo-jin - Warriors of the Dawn	Dalpalan - Vanishing Time: A Boy Who Returned; Bang Jun-seok - Anarchist from Colony; Mowg - The King; Jo Yeong-wook - Single Rider; Jo Yeong-wook - A Taxi Driver
Technical Award	Best Planning
The Villainess; A Taxi Driver; The King; Pandora; The Prison	A Taxi Driver; Anarchist from Colony; The King; New Trial; Pandora
Special Award	
Kim Young-ae
