= Vanishing Time: A Boy Who Returned =

- Theatrical release poster
- Hangul: 가려진 시간
- Lit.: Obscured Time
- RR: Garyeojin sigan
- MR: Karyŏjin sigan
- Directed by: Um Tae-hwa
- Written by: Um Tae-hwa
- Produced by: Park A-hyoung
- Starring: Gang Dong-won; Shin Eun-soo
- Cinematography: Go Nak-seon
- Edited by: Kim Chang-ju
- Music by: Dalpalan
- Production companies: Barunson E&A Corp.
- Distributed by: Showbox
- Release date: November 16, 2016
- Running time: 129 minutes
- Country: South Korea
- Language: Korean
- Box office: US$3.3 million

Vanishing Time: A Boy Who Returned (Korean: 가려진 시간) is a 2016 South Korean fantasy film written and directed by Um Tae-hwa and starring Gang Dong-won and Shin Eun-soo. This is the second feature film by Um Tae-hwa. The idea of the film was strongly influenced by the sinking of MV Sewol which occurred in 2014. Um explained that after the Sewol disaster, the government tried to hide the truth, and therefore he decided to shoot a film where the main theme is a search for truth.

== Synopsis ==
After losing her mother, Soo-rin moves to Hwano Road with her new stepfather. Withdrawn into her own imagination, Soo-rin spends her days alone until Sung-min approaches her first. They begin to create memories shared only between the two of them, with secret codes and a world of their own. One day, they head into the mountains with friends to watch a construction site explosion, but everyone mysteriously disappears except Soo-rin, who returns alone.

Days later, a man claiming to be Sung-min appears before her. He tells her that he's become an adult, trapped in frozen time. While only Soo-rin believes him, the police and the townspeople remain suspicious, and Sung-min becomes a fugitive

== Cast ==
- Gang Dong-won as Sung-min
  - Lee Hyo-je as young Sung-min
- Shin Eun-soo as Soo-rin
- Uhm Tae-goo as Tae-shik
  - Kim Dan-yool as young Tae-shik
- Kim Hee-won as Do-kyun
- Kwon Hae-hyo as Baek-ki
- Jung Woo-jin as Jae-wook
- Park Jong-hwan as Jin-sung
- Park Jin-woo as Tae-shik's father
- Park Sung-yeon as Tae-shik's mother
- Kim Tae-han as Jae-wook's father
- Kim Jung-young as Jae-wook's mother
- Oh Hee-joon as Search police
- Kim Hak-sun as Section chief Park
- Seo Joo-hee as Orphanage director
- Ahn Ji-ho as Sang-chul
- Ahn Sang-woo as Sang-chul's father
- Ok Jae-sub as Tae-shik's grandfather
- Moon So-ri as Dr. Min

== Awards and nominations ==
Year	Award	Category	Recipient	Result
2016	Korea Top Star Awards	Popular Star Award	Shin Eun-soo	Won
2017	22nd Chunsa Film Art Awards	Best New Actress	Shin Eun-soo	Nominated
2017	16th New York Asian Film Festival	Star Asia Award	Gang Dong-won	Won
2017	54th Grand Bell Awards	Best New Actress	Shin Eun-soo	Nominated
2017	54th Grand Bell Awards	Best New Director	Um Tae-hwa	Won
2017	54th Grand Bell Awards	Best Screenplay	Um Tae-hwa	Nominated
2017	54th Grand Bell Awards	Best Music	Dalpalan	Won
2017	12th Festival du Film Coréen à Paris	Audience Award	Vanishing Time: A Boy Who Returned	Won
