= Tomb of Queen Jindeok =

Silla-era tomb in Gyeongju, South Korea

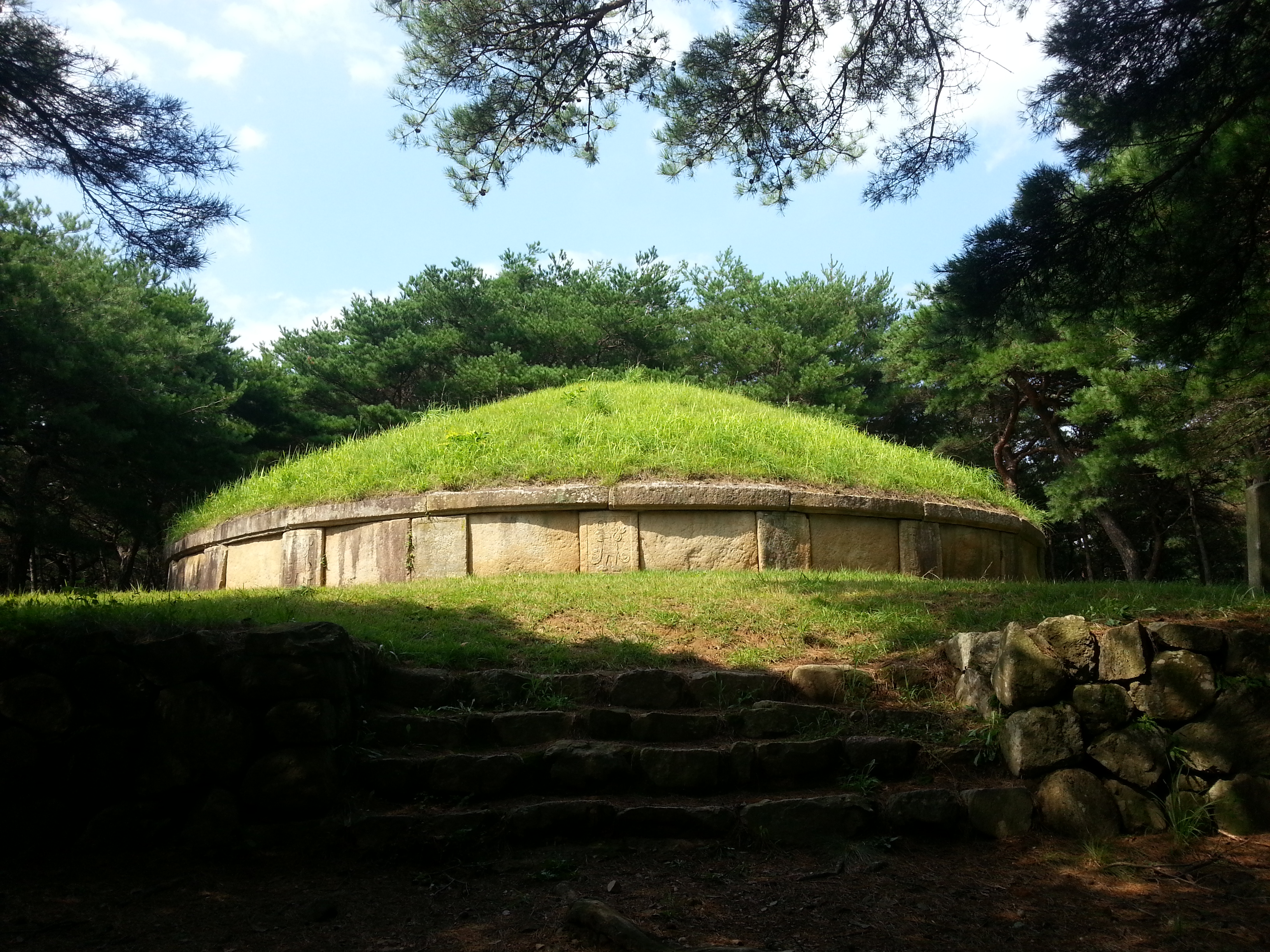
- The tomb (2015)
- Interactive map of Tomb of Queen Jindeok
- Location: Gyeongju, South Korea
- Coordinates: 35°53′9″N 129°12′5″E
- Built for: Jindeok of Silla

Historic Sites of South Korea
- Official name: Tomb of Queen Jindeok, Gyeongju
- Designated: 1963-01-21
- Reference no.: 24

The Tomb of Queen Jindeok (Korean: 진덕여왕릉; Hanja: 眞德女王陵) is a tumulus tomb believed to belong to Jindeok, the 28th monarch of Silla (r. 647–654 (Note: Per the Korean calendar (lunisolar).)). Its ownership is disputed; some believe the tomb belongs to King Sinmu. On January 21, 1963, it was made Historic Site of South Korea No. 24.

The tomb has a diameter of 14.4 m (47 ft) and height of 4 m (13 ft). It is surrounded by twelve stone slabs, each carved with an image of an animal of the zodiac. It was renovated in 1975.
