= Choi Jin-ho (actor) =

South Korean actor (born 1968)

- Born: May 26, 1968 (age 58); Seocho District, Seoul, South Korea
- Occupation: Actor
- Years active: 1991–present

Korean name
- Hangul: 최진호
- RR: Choe Jinho
- MR: Ch'oe Chinho

Choi Jin-ho (born May 26, 1968) is a South Korean actor.

== Early life ==
Before becoming an actor, he was a judo athlete from middle school until the second year of university.

== Filmography ==
=== Film ===
Year	Title	Role	Notes
1998	Saturday, 2:00 PM	Hotelier	
2004	Shin Suk Ki Blues	Jazz cafe manager	
2005	The Aggressives	PD Kim	
2005	Hello, Brother	Dr. Na Yeong-soo	
2006	Bloody Tie	Chang Joon	
2006	Seducing Mr. Perfect	Vice President Maeda	
2007	The Mafia, The Salesman	Planning director	
2007	My New Partner	Public prosecutor	
2007	Beautiful Sunday		
2007	If You Were Me - Anima Vision 2		
2007	Da Capo	Bakery owner	
2008	Truck	Oh Ka Won’s husband	
2008	The Good, the Bad, the Weird	Firearms shop owner	
2008	Story of Wine	Dental director Choi	
2008	Romantic Island	Interviewer	
2008	Sweet Lie	Doctor	
2009	Kill Me	Han Joon-soek	
2009	Vegetarian	Director Park	
2009	Jeon Woo Chi: The Taoist Wizard	Leader in suit	
2009	White Night	Kim Shi-hoo	
2009	Hoe	Mao	
2010	I Saw the Devil	Planning director	
2011	The Crucible	Prosecutor	
2012	R2B: Return to Base	Coalition headquarters controller	
2012	The Thieves	One-eyed peeper	
2013	The Terror Live	Anchor Lee Sang-jin	
2014	The Killer Behind, The Old Man	The Killer	short film from Three Charmed Lives
2014	Good Friends	Lee Soo	
2015	Gangnam Blues	Park Seung-goo	
2016	Insane	Jang Hyeong-sik	
2016	My New Sassy Girl	Kim Jeon Moo	
2018	Illang: The Wolf Brigade	Chief Presidential Secretary	
2019	No Mercy	Park Young-choon	
2020	The Swordsman	Lee Mok-yo	
2021	The 8th Night	Professor Kim Joon-cheol	Netflix

=== Television series ===
Year	Title	Role
1991	Magpie Daughter in Law	
1993	To Live	
1994	Because of You	
1995	You Said You Love Me	
1996	Splendid Holiday	
1997	Sea of Ambition	Director Kim
1999	Beautiful Secret	
1999	Magic Castle	
2001	Tender Hearts	
2003	South of the Sun	Min Dae Ri
2003	Jewel in the Palace	Wae-goon leader
2004	Toji, the Land	Military police general
2007	Time Between Dog and Wolf	President Park
2007	New Heart	British Prime Minister's assistant
2010	Blossom Sisters	
2010	Athena: Goddess of War	
2011	Ojakgyo Family	Manager Kim
2011	City Hunter	Director Hudson (U.S. military arm dealer)(Ep.6)
2012	Phantom	Dam Sa Myeong
2012	My Lover, Madame Butterfly	
2013	Incarnation of Money	Lee Gwan Soo
2013	The Heirs	Choi Dong Wook
2014	You're All Surrounded	Park Seung Oh
2014	Liar Game	Director Jang of broadcasting station
2015	Thank You My Son	Jang Hyeong Joon
2015	Assembly	Jo Woong Gyoo
2015	Oh My Venus	Min Byeong Wook
2016	Moorim School: Saga of the Brave	D.S. ent representative
2016	Mrs. Cop 2	Baek Jong Sik
2016	Dr. Romantic	Do Yoon-wan
2018	Mr. Sunshine	Kwan Ryo/Lee Se-hoon
2019	Extraordinary You	Baek Dae-sung
2020	Dr. Romantic 2	Do Yoon-wan
2020	Awaken	Son Min-ho
2021	Beyond Evil	Han Ki-Hwan
2022–2023	The Love in Your Eyes	Kim Chang-i
2022–2023	Unlock My Boss	Shim Seung-bo
2023	See You in My 19th Life	Moon Jung-hoon
2023	The Escape of the Seven	Secretary Gu Kang-Jae
2024	The Impossible Heir	Kang Joong-Mo
2024	No Gain No Love	Park Ki-Ho
2025	Spirit Fingers	Eun-Gi's senior (ep.10)
2026	Dream Stage	Youn Ki's father (Cameo The first Japan Drama)
2026	Make Me Tingle	Dokgo Young-Hoon (Cameo)
2026	Love in Disguise	Yoon Tae-Sik
