= The Beast (2019 film) =

South Korean crime thriller film

- Theatrical release poster
- Hangul: 비스트
- RR: Biseuteu
- MR: Pisŭt'ŭ
- Directed by: Lee Jung-ho
- Screenplay by: Lee Jung-Ho; Jung Eui-Mok
- Produced by: Oh Sung-Il; Song Ji-Eun; Park Joon-Soo; Park Kyung-Seo; Lee Soo-Jin; Nam Da-Jung; Kim Soo-Hyun
- Starring: Lee Sung-min; Yoo Jae-Myung; Jeon Hye-jin; Choi Daniel
- Production company: Studio&NEW
- Distributed by: Next Entertainment World
- Release date: June 26, 2019
- Running time: 130 minutes
- Country: South Korea
- Language: Korean
- Box office: US$1.3 million

The Beast (Korean: 비스트; RR: Biseuteu) is a 2019 South Korean action thriller film directed by Lee Jung-ho, starring Lee Sung-min, Yoo Jae-Myung, Jeon Hye-jin, and Choi Daniel. The story is about the conflicts of two detectives in solving a brutal murder case. The film is a remake of the French film, 36 Quai des Orfèvres (2004).

== Plot ==
Two detectives in conflict have to team up to solve a gruesome murder. After the mutilated body of a missing girl is discovered in the tidelands of Incheon, Han-soo (Lee Sung-min) and Min-tae (Yoo Jae-myung), who have been rivals for years, are now in charge of finding the culprit. The case seems like it will find a quick resolution with a suspect in custody, but things take a dark turn when Han-soo meets an informant who insists that he knows who the murderer is. As cover-ups and secret deals ensue, tensions rise between the two detectives as the pressure of solving the crime, which is shaking up the Korean Peninsula, comes to a head.

== Cast ==
- Lee Sung-Min as Detective Han-soo
- Yoo Jae-Myung as Detective Min-tae
- Jeon Hye-Jin as Choon-bae
- Choi Daniel as Detective Jong-chan
- Kim Ho-jung as Madame Oh
- Ahn Si-ha as Jung-Yeon
- Lee Sang-hee Yeo Mi-Young
- Kim Byung-Choon as Section Chief Sung
- Kim Hong-Fa as Chief Executive Officer Jang of Chinatown
- Kim Young-Sung as Detective 1 Team 1
- Kim Dae-Gon as Detective 2 Team 1
- Han Kyu-Won as Detective 2 Team 2
- Kim Min-Song as Detective 1 Team 3
- Lee Hyun-Kyun as Chae Pil-Kyo
- Baek In-Kwon as Jo Doo-Sik
- Jang Nam-Boo as naked man (Kim Nam-Cheol)
- Kim Gui-Seon as elderly man informant
- Lee Seo-Hwan as forensic team member
- Jung Chan-Woo as inspection department member
- Shim Wan-Jun as man in black hood (regional investigation unit)
- Ok Ja-yeon as Jong-Chan's wife
- Park Tae-Sung as prison officer
- Ahn Seong-Bong as backup detective
- Choi Moon-Soo as terminal yellow bracelet girl's mother
- Kim Dae-Han as Korean-Chinese Wild Dog gang
- Lim Ye-Eun as tortured woman

== Production ==
Principal photography began on November 5, 2018 and wrapped on February 12, 2019.

== Release ==
The Beast was released in South Korea on June 26, 2019.

=== International release ===
Movie 'The Beast' has been pre-sold in 90 countries around the world including France, Germany, Austria, Switzerland, Netherlands, Belgium, Luxembourg, Bosnia, Croatia, Slovenia, Europe, Russia, Kazakhstan, Uzbekistan, Japan, Singapore, Taiwan, Thailand, Malaysia, Indonesia and other countries in Asia.
