= The Merciless =

- Theatrical poster
- Hangul: 불한당: 나쁜 놈들의 세상
- Hanja: 不汗黨: 나쁜 놈들의 世上
- RR: Bulhandang: nappeun nomdeurui sesang
- MR: Purhandang: nappŭn nomdŭrŭi sesang
- Directed by: Byun Sung-hyun
- Written by: Byun Sung-hyun; Kim Min-soo
- Produced by: Yun Ji-won
- Starring: Sul Kyung-gu; Yim Si-wan
- Cinematography: Cho Hyoung-rae
- Edited by: Kim Jae-bum; Kim Sang-bum
- Music by: Kim Hong-jip; Lee Jin-hee
- Production companies: CJ E&M
- Distributed by: CJ Entertainment
- Release date: May 17, 2017
- Running time: 120 minutes
- Country: South Korea
- Language: Korean
- Box office: US$6.9 million

The Merciless (Korean: 불한당) is a 2017 South Korean crime-action film directed by Byun Sung-hyun, and starring Sul Kyung-gu and Yim Si-wan. The film was released in South Korea on May 17, 2017. It was shown out of competition in the Midnight Screenings section at the 70th Cannes Film Festival on May 24, 2017.

== Plot ==
The story is about the loyalty and betrayal between an inmate leader and an undercover cop/prisoner, who team to take over a gang. It centers around the main character Hyun soo, the undercover cop, and Han Jaeho the inmate leader.

== Cast ==
- Sul Kyung-gu as Jae-ho
- Yim Si-wan as Hyun-soo
- Kim Hee-won as Byung-gab
- Jeon Hye-jin as Chun In-sook
- Lee Geung-young as Byung-chul
- Jang In-sub as Min-chul
- Kim Ji-hoon as Jung-sik
- Lee Ji-hoon as Public prosecutor Oh
- Choi Byung-mo as Captain Choi
- Moon Ji-yoon as Young-geun
- Nam Gi-ae as Hyun-soo's mother
- Jin Seon-kyu as Prison Security Section Chief

=== Special appearance ===
- Huh Joon-ho as Kim Sung-han

=== Cameo ===
- Shin So-yul as Osean Trading advertisement beauty 1
- Kim Bo-mi as Osean Trading advertisement beauty 2
- Lee Mi-so as Osean Trading advertisement beauty 3
- Kim Sung-oh as Jung Seung-pil

== Release ==
Prior to its local release, the film has been pre-sold to 85 countries including France, the Netherlands, Belgium, Japan, Australia, India, Taiwan, the Philippines and Singapore at the 2017 Hong Kong Film Mart. According to the distributor CJ Entertainment the film was later sold to additional territories, reaching a total of 117 countries worldwide.

The film was released in French cinemas on June 28, 2017, by ARP Distributors.

== Reception ==
The film received a seven-minute standing ovation at the 2017 Cannes Film Festival.

Michele Halberstadt from ARP Films praised the film for its screenwriting, direction and characters.

According to the Korean Film Council, the film topped the Korean box office on the first day of release and sold 95,261 tickets.

== Adaptation ==
On December 28, 2017, CJ E&M, the production company of The Merciless, announced a television adaptation of the film. According to the company, the script will be written in 2018, and the drama would be produced in 2019.

== Awards and nominations ==
Award	Category	Recipient	Result
1st JIMFF Awards	JIMFF OST Award	Kim Hong-jip; Lee Jin-hee	Won
Korean Film Shining Star Awards	Star Award	Sul Kyung-gu	Won
1st The Seoul Awards	Best Film	The Merciless	Nominated
1st The Seoul Awards	Best Actor	Sul Kyung-gu	Nominated
1st The Seoul Awards	Best Supporting Actress	Jeon Hye-jin	Nominated
1st The Seoul Awards	Most Popular Actor (Film)	Yim Si-wan	Won
26th Buil Film Awards	Best Supporting Actor	Kim Hee-won	Won
54th Grand Bell Awards	Best Film	The Merciless	Nominated
54th Grand Bell Awards	Best Director	Byun Sung-hyun	Nominated
54th Grand Bell Awards	Best Actor	Sul Kyung-gu	Won
54th Grand Bell Awards	Best Supporting Actress	Jeon Hye-jin	Nominated
54th Grand Bell Awards	Best Supporting Actor	Kim Hee-won	Nominated
54th Grand Bell Awards	Best Lighting	Park Jeong-woo	Nominated
54th Grand Bell Awards	Best Cinematography	Cho Hyoung-rae	Nominated
54th Grand Bell Awards	Best Editing	Kim Sang-beom & Kim Jae-beom	Nominated
37th Korean Association of Film Critics Awards	Best Actor	Sul Kyung-gu	Won
37th Korean Association of Film Critics Awards	Best Supporting Actress	Jeon Hye-jin	Won
37th Korean Association of Film Critics Awards	Top 10 Films	The Merciless	Won
38th Blue Dragon Film Awards	Best Film	The Merciless	Nominated
38th Blue Dragon Film Awards	Best Director	Byun Sung-hyun	Nominated
38th Blue Dragon Film Awards	Best Actor	Sul Kyung-gu	Nominated
38th Blue Dragon Film Awards	Popular Star Award	Sul Kyung-gu	Won
38th Blue Dragon Film Awards	Best Supporting Actor	Kim Hee-won	Nominated
38th Blue Dragon Film Awards	Best Supporting Actress	Jeon Hye-jin	Nominated
38th Blue Dragon Film Awards	Best Cinematography and Lighting	Jo Hyung-rae & Park Jeong-woo	Won
38th Blue Dragon Film Awards	Best Editing	Kim Sang-beom & Kim Jae-beom	Nominated
38th Blue Dragon Film Awards	Best Music	Kim Hong-jip & Lee Jin-hee	Nominated
38th Blue Dragon Film Awards	Best Art Direction	Han Ah-reum	Nominated
54th Baeksang Arts Awards	Best Actor (Film)	Sul Kyung-gu	Nominated
54th Baeksang Arts Awards	Best Supporting Actor (Film)	Kim Hee-won	Nominated
54th Baeksang Arts Awards	Best Supporting Actress (Film)	Jeon Hye-jin	Nominated
54th Baeksang Arts Awards	Technical Award (Film)	Kim Sang-beom	Nominated
23rd Chunsa Film Art Awards	Best Actor	Sul Kyung-gu	Nominated
23rd Chunsa Film Art Awards	Best Supporting Actor	Kim Hee-won	Nominated
23rd Chunsa Film Art Awards	Best Supporting Actress	Jeon Hye-jin	Nominated
