= Um Tae-hwa =

South Korean film director and screenwriter

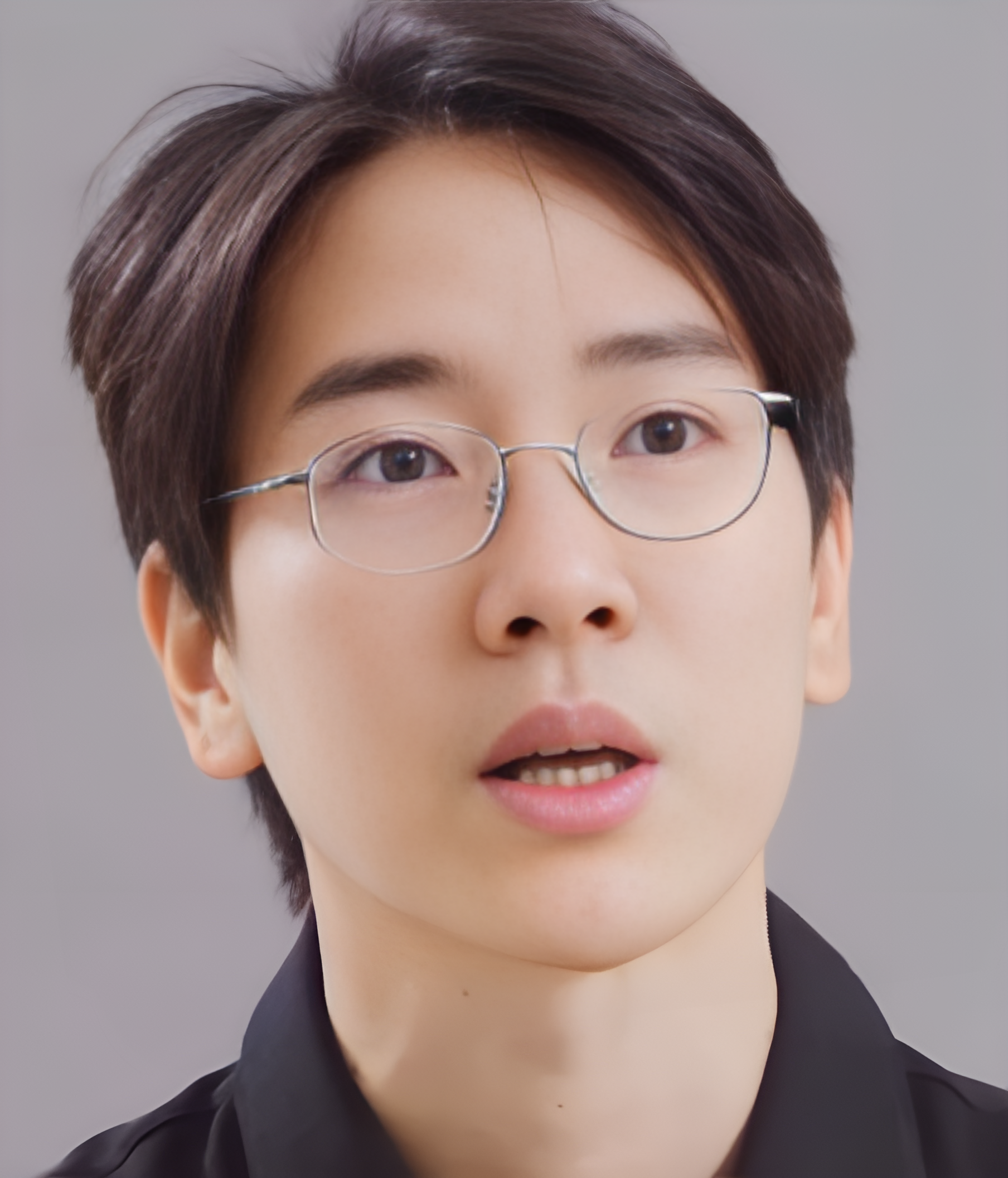
- Um in 2023
- Born: 1980 (age 45–46); Seoul, South Korea
- Occupations: Film director; screenwriter
- Years active: 2002–present
- Spouse: Unknown (m. 2023)
- Relatives: Um Tae-goo (brother)

Korean name
- Hangul: 엄태화
- RR: Eom Taehwa
- MR: Ŏm T'aehwa

Um Tae-hwa (born 1980) is a South Korean film director and screenwriter known for his work in both short and feature films. Trained under acclaimed director Park Chan-wook, Um worked as an assistant director on Three... Extremes, Lady Vengeance, and Night Fishing.

He frequently collaborates with his younger brother, actor Uhm Tae-goo, casting him in several of his projects, including Forest, Heart Vibrator, and INGtoogi: The Battle of Internet Trolls (2013). INGtoogi marked Um's feature directorial debut and earned critical acclaim and multiple award nominations, including at the Wildflower Film Awards and Baeksang Arts Awards.

His subsequent films include the fantasy drama Vanishing Time: A Boy Who Returned (2018) and the disaster thriller Concrete Utopia (2023), the latter of which was selected as South Korea’s official submission for the Best International Feature Film category at the 96th Academy Awards.

== Education and early works ==
Um Tae-hwa was born in 1980. He graduated from Dongsan High School in Ansan in 1999 and pursue a degree in Advertising Design from Hongik University. Although he initially had no specific aspirations in the arts, he enjoyed creating stories and drawing cartoons to share with those around him. While working part-time on a movie art team during college, he realized that film could be a medium to express his interests. Um began his career by directing short films.

In 2002, he co-directed the documentary Sunhee, Don't Cry, which was screened at the 2002 Indie Documentary Festival and the Jeonju Human Rights Film Festival. The following year, he directed the short film Cactus, which won the Best Short Film Award at the 1st Sangnoksu Short Film Festival.

Around the time of his graduation in 2004, Um shared his desire to make films with a professor, who introduced him to Lee Seung-chul, a simultaneous sound recordist and director Park Chan-wook's staff. Through this connection, Um joined the production of Park Chan-wook's music video for singer Lee Seung-yeol and film Lady Vengeance. In 2007, he directed the short film Fill My Wisdom Tooth Hole. and on the film Epitaph (2007) by brothers Jung Sik and Jung Bum-shik.

Um's documentary Common Story, released in 2009, won the Public Access Video Festival Award. In 2010, Um and his brother collaborated on the short film Home Sweet Home (Yusukja), with Uhm Tae-goo playing a homeless man after another actor had to drop out due to the requirement of a shaved head. The film was selected for the 4th Great Short Film Festival and competed in the short film categories at the 5th International Student Peace Film Festival and the 2010 Seoul Independent Film Festival.

In 2011, he enrolled at 28th class of the Directing Department of the Korean Academy of Film Arts (KAFA). In 2012 he directed the short film Forest with Uhm Tae-goo took the lead role and earned an acting award at the 13th Daegu Independent Short Film Festival. This film also won the grand prize at the Mise-en-scène Short Film Festival. Following this, Um directed the short film Heart Vibrator, created as part of KAFA’s 40th Anniversary Special Exhibition, featuring Hong Seok-jae, Uhm Tae-goo, and Ryu Hye-young.

In 2013, Um completed his first full-length independent film, INGtoogi: The Battle of Internet Trolls, which starred Uhm Tae-goo, Ryu Hye-young, and Kwon Yul. As a KAFA graduation project supported by Park Chan-wook, the film follows Tae-sik, an introverted and unemployed man who, after being cyberbullied, challenges his tormentor to a martial arts match with help from friends. Ingtoogi received nominations for Best Film, Best Director, and Best New Director at the 1st Wildflower Film Awards, as well as Best New Director at the 50th Baeksang Arts Awards in 2014.

== Career ==
Um continued to work as an assistant director and film crew on projects such as Manshin: Ten Thousand Spirits (2014), Tinker Ticker (2014), The Wicked (2015), and Socialphobia (2015).

In 2018, Um directed the fantasy film Vanishing Time: A Boy Who Returned, starring Gang Dong-won as Sung-min. He reunited with Uhm Tae-goo, who portrayed the adult version of Tae-sik, one of the boys experiencing a mysterious "vanishing time" phenomenon after encountering a glowing egg in a cave.

Um directed the disaster film Concrete Utopia, adapted from the webtoon Pleasant Outcast by Kim Soong-nyung. Co-written with Lee Shin-ji, the film stars Lee Byung-hun, Park Seo-joon, and Park Bo-young. Uhm Tae-goo also appears as "homeless person 1", chosen for his strong presence that impacts the film's flow. The film premiered on August 9, 2023, and was screened in the Gala section of the Toronto International Film Festival in September 2023. It was selected as South Korea’s entry for the Best International Feature Film category at the 96th Academy Awards in 2024.

In 2024, Um directed his first music video for the song "Love Wins All", featuring IU and BTS member V as a married couple in a post-apocalyptic world. The music video was released on January 24, 2024, along with the song.

In June 2025, Um was featured in The Muju Film Festival's special program called Director's Focus. During the film festival period from June 6 to 8, director Uhm's feature and short films will be screened and related talk programs will also be held.

== Personal life ==
His younger brother Uhm Tae-goo, is a South Korean actor. Um married a non-celebrity girlfriend on April 29, 2023 in Gangnam, Seoul. Um's wife is known to have worked as an interior designer and the head of a design studio.

== Filmography ==
=== Short film ===
Short film credits
Year	Title		Credited as				Ref.
Year	English	Korean	Director	Screenplay	Editor	Storyboard	Ref.
2002	The Story About Sun-hee	선희야 노올자	co-directing	—N/a			
2003	Cactus	선인장	Yes				
2010	Common Story	신봉리 우리집: 흔한이야기	Yes				
2011	Nice Shorts! 2011 (segment: "Home Sweet Home")	유숙자	Yes				
2012	Forest	숲	Yes				
2012	Heart Vibrator	하트바이브레이터	Yes				
2024	Love Wins All (IU MV)		Yes				

=== Feature film ===
Feature film credits
Year	Title		Credited as				Ref.
Year	English	Korean	Director	Screenplay	Storyboard	Other	Ref.
2004	Three... Extremes	쓰리, 몬스터	directing team	—N/a	—N/a	—N/a	
2005	Sympathy for Lady Vengeance	친절한 금자씨	assistant director	—N/a	—N/a	—N/a	
2006	The Faces	얼굴들	—N/a	—N/a	—N/a	actor	
2007	Epitaph	기담	assistant director	—N/a	—N/a	—N/a	
2011	Night Fishing	파란만장	assistant director	—N/a	Yes	—N/a	
2013	Ingtoogi: The Battle of Internet Trolls	잉투기	Yes	Yes	—N/a	Editor	
2014	Manshin: Ten Thousand Spirits	파란만장	—N/a	scripter	Yes	—N/a	
2014	Tinker Ticker	들개	—N/a	—N/a	—N/a	actor	
2014	The Wicked	마녀	—N/a	—N/a	Yes	—N/a	
2015	Socialphobia	소셜포비아	—N/a	—N/a	—N/a	Cinematography team	
2016	Vanishing Time: A Boy Who Returned	가려진 시간	Yes	—N/a	—N/a	—N/a	
2023	Concrete Utopia	콘크리트 유토피아	Yes	co-writer	—N/a	—N/a	

== Awards and nominations ==
Year	Award	Category	Recipient	Result	Ref.
2017	54th Grand Bell Awards	Best New Director	Vanishing Time: A Boy Who Returned	Won	
2017	54th Grand Bell Awards	Best Screenplay	Vanishing Time: A Boy Who Returned	Nominated	
2017	12th Festival du Film Coréen à Paris	Audience Award	Vanishing Time: A Boy Who Returned	Won	
2023	32nd Buil Film Awards	Best Director	Concrete Utopia	Nominated	
2023	44th Blue Dragon Film Awards	Best Director	Concrete Utopia	Won	
2023	59th Grand Bell Awards	Best Director	Concrete Utopia	Nominated	
2024	60th Baeksang Arts Awards	Best Film	Concrete Utopia	Nominated	
2024	60th Baeksang Arts Awards	Best Director	Concrete Utopia	Nominated	
