= Lee Tae-vin =

South Korean actor (born 1996)

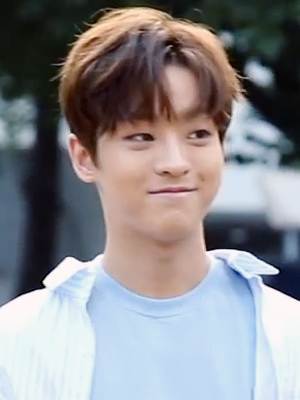
- Lee in 2018
- Born: Lee Tae-vin; January 22, 1996 (age 30); Busan, South Korea
- Occupations: Actor; singer; rapper; dancer
- Years active: 2017–present
- Agent: IOK Company

Korean name
- Hangul: 이세웅
- RR: I Seung
- MR: I Seung

Stage name
- Hangul: 이태빈
- RR: I Taebin
- MR: I T'aebin

Lee Se-woong (Korean: 이세웅; born January 22, 1996), also known by his stage name Lee Tae-vin (Korean: 이태빈), is a South Korean actor, singer, rapper and dancer. He was a member of the boy group Myteen debuted in 2017, he is known for his best acting in The Penthouse: War in Life, 365: Repeat the Year, and Love for Loves Sake.

== Early life and education ==
Lee Tae-vin was born on January 22, 1996, in Busan, South Korea.

== Career ==
=== 2017–2018: Myteen activities ===
Lee debuted as a member of the boy group Myteen, Music Works first boy group, which on July 26, 2017, debuted with the release of their first mini album Myteen Go!. Before debut, Lee appeared in Myteen's debut reality show 'Trainee Escape Project - Myteen Go! which aired on MBC Music TV broadcast and was the first member to shoot an advertisement. In 2018, Lee made a surprise appearance in the MBN drama Rich Man in episode 11 as Lee Jae-young. On December 31, 2018, Music Works announced the news of Lee's departure from Myteen via the official fancafe.

=== 2019–present: Acting debut ===
On May 21, 2019, Lee was cast in the theater Another Country as Menzies. On November 12, Lee signed an exclusive contract with Crebig Entertainment to pursue his acting career.

On March 19, 2020, Crebig Entertainment announced that Lee was cast in MBC's television series 365: Repeat the Year as Choi Young-woong.

On August 26, 2021, Lee was cast in the web series Delivery. On September 7, Lee signed an exclusive contract with KeyEast.

In 2024, he played the main role of Tae Myeong-ha in the boylove drama Love for Love's Sake.

On March 22, 2024, Lee signed an official exclusive contract with IOK Company.

== Filmography ==
=== Television series ===
Year	Title	Role	Notes	Ref.
2018	Rich Man	Lee Jae-young	Episode 11	
2020	365: Repeat the Year	Choi Young-woong	Episode 10–20	
2020-2021	The Penthouse: War in Life	Lee Min-hyuk	Season 1–3	

=== Web series ===
Year	Title	Role	Ref.
2021	Delivery	Do Ki-hwan	
2024	Love for Loves Sake	Tae Myung-ha	

=== Music video appearances ===
Year	Song title	Artist	Ref.
2017	"Just I Like U"	Gilgu Bonggu (GB9) (feat. Niihwa)	
2019	"Deep"	Yoo Seung-jun	

== Theater ==
Year	Title	Role	Ref.
2019–2020	Another Country	Menzies	
