= Underground (2026 film) =

2026 South Korean film

- Main poster
- Hangul: 지하도
- RR: Jihado
- MR: Chihado
- Directed by: Choi Woo-sik
- Starring: Shin Hyun-soo; Lee Yu-ji; Go Geon-han
- Production company: EO Content Group
- Distributed by: KT Studio Genie
- Release date: August 13, 2026
- Running time: 92 minutes
- Country: South Korea
- Language: Korean

Underground (Korean: 지하도; RR: Jihado) is a 2026 South Korean mystery horror film directed by Choi Woo-sik. The film starring Shin Hyun-soo, Lee Yu-ji, and Go Geon-han. It follows the story of a team leader who returns to the subway construction site where work had been halted due to a fatal accident, and he faces endless terror and escape in an underpass where the vengeful spirits of that day have returned.

The film was released on August 13, 2026, through Internet Protocol television (IPTV), video on demand (VOD), and OTT platforms in South Korea.

== Plot ==
Seung-hyun, a construction team leader at a construction company, is ordered by his site manager to inspect the site in preparation for the resumption of the Dohak Station extension project, which was halted two years ago following a fatal accident. There, he meets Joo-young, who introduces herself as a railway construction employee, and the two enter the underground passage together.

The underground passage has been deserted, and its damp, oppressive atmosphere is intensified by the monsoon season. Suddenly, the sound of blasting comes from somewhere in the distance. But the construction was clearly suspended. To make matters worse, there is no cell reception, cutting them off from the outside world.

Just as Seung-hyun and Joo-young, sensing that something is wrong, attempt to leave the underground passage, two unidentified workers, Chung-hyun and Dong-jin, appear and threaten them. Terrified, they desperately try to escape, but no matter how far they run, there is no exit.

Meanwhile, Han Sang-jin, the head of the construction company, and Master Gwi-mun, a shaman, arrive at the underground passage at Dohak Station to perform a ceremony for the resumption of construction. When the ritual begins, Master Gwi-mun becomes possessed by a spirit. Overcome by rage, the vengeful spirits inflict harm on both Han Sang-jin and the shaman himself. They attempt to uncover the entity that has lured them into the depths of darkness.

== Cast ==
- Shin Hyun-soo as Kwon Seung-hyun
- Lee Yu-ji as Joo-young
- Go Geon-han
- Lee Chang-min
- Moon Seong-bok
- Park Hyun-young
- Jeong Hyeong-seok
- Hong Hee-yong
- Hong Sung-pyo

== Production ==
=== Development ===
The film was produced by EO Contents Group, a production company known to produce the horror thriller series and film including Night Has Come, Bloody Flower, Dear Hongrang, and The Ghost Game.

=== Casting ===
On October 2, 2024, the film was first publicly announced, with its cast confirmed including Shin Hyun-soo, Lee Yu-ji, and Go Geon-han as lead actors, along with Lee Chang-min, Moon Seong-bok, Park Hyun-young, Jeong Hyeong-seok, Hong Hee-yong, and Hong Sung-pyo.

=== Filming ===
Principal photography began on September 29, 2024.

== Release ==
=== Home media ===
It was released on August 13, 2026, in South Korea through Internet Protocol television (IPTV), Video on demand (VOD), and OTT platforms, including KT Genie TV, SK Btv, LG Uplus, KT SkyLife, Wavve, Coupang Play, and Watcha.
