= IOK =

IOK may refer to:

- Indian-occupied Kashmir, the name used by Pakistan for the portion of Kashmir under Indian authority
- Island of Kesmai, an early online game
- IOK Media, a South Korean media outlet
- IOK-1, a galaxy in the constellation of Coma Berenices
