= Lee Moo-saeng =

South Korean actor (born 1980)

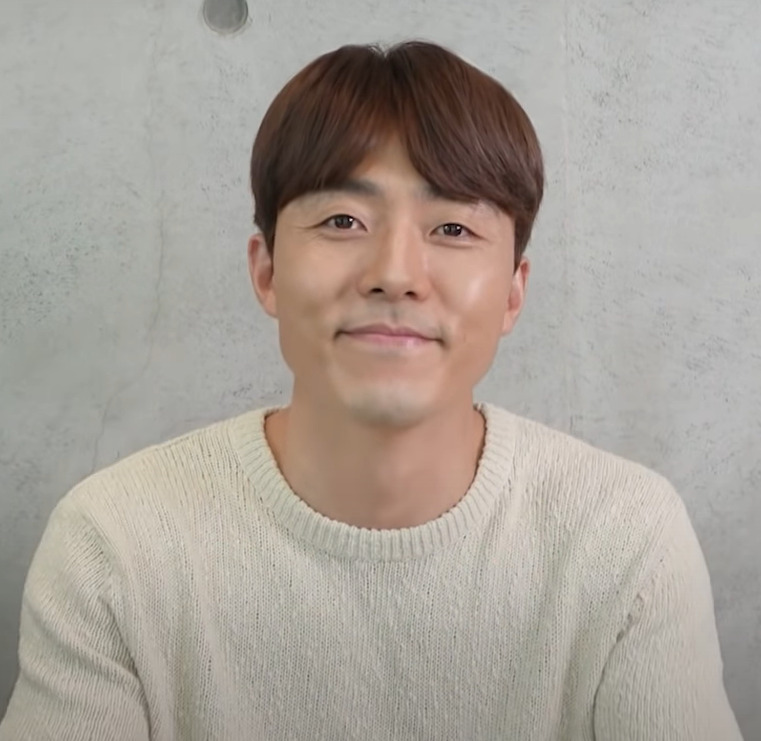
- Lee in 2020
- Born: May 10, 1980 (age 46); Yongin, Gyeonggi-do, South Korea
- Occupation: Actor
- Years active: 2005–present
- Agent: Alien Company
- Spouse: Unknown (m. 2011)
- Children: 2

Korean name
- Hangul: 이무생
- RR: I Musaeng
- MR: I Musaeng

Lee Moo-saeng (Korean: 이무생; born May 10, 1980), is a South Korean actor. He is best known for his roles in the television dramas The World of the Married (2020), The Silent Sea (2021), Thirty-Nine (2022), and Cleaning Up (2022).

== Early life and education ==
Lee Moo-saeng was born on May 10, 1980, in Yongin-si, Gyeonggi, South Korea. His initial foray into acting was driven by a simple desire: "I just had a vague thought, I'd really love to be on TV". After completing his high school college entrance exams and contemplating his future, Lee attended an acting academy for two months to seriously pursue this dream. He was successfully admitted to Department of Film of Sejong University. He recounted enjoying his four years there, where he developed a relationship with his mentor, actor Lee Soon-jae, and learned a lot. In 2006, he graduated with Bachelor of Arts in Film Arts.

== Career ==
=== 2006–2019: Early career and building success ===
Lee made his debut in 2006 as Joon-tae in the film See You After School and later appeared in series and films such as Special Affairs Team TEN, Fengshui, Prison Playbook, and Something in the Rain.

In particular in 2019, Lee received widespread recognition for his acting skills through his portrayal of various roles in works such as The Crowned Clown, One Spring Night, Designated Survivor: 60 Days, and Melting Me Softly.

=== 2020–present: Rise in popularity ===
In 2020, Lee gained popularity with his performance in the melodrama romance series The World of the Married in the role of Kim Yoon-ki. In the same year, he was cast in Netflix's original series The Silent Sea with Bae Doona and Gong Yoo.

In 2021, he was cast in the romance drama Thirty-Nine alongside Son Ye-jin and Jeon Mi-do. Following the release of the series in 2022, he received much praise in his role as Kim Jin-seok. Lee's success was followed by a leading role in the drama Cleaning Up alongside Yum Jung-ah. Lee also received critical acclaim for his portrayal of Kang Yeong-cheon, a psychopathic murderer, in The Glory.

Lee's popularity continued to rise, starring as Yoo Jung-jae alongside Lee Young-ae in Maestra: Strings of Truth which aired on tvN from December 9, 2023, to January 14, 2024. He portrayed the role of Konishi Yukinaga in Noryang: Deadly Sea a 2023 South Korean historical war action film and the role of Kim Yoon-gi in Citizen of a Kind.

It was also announced that Lee has been cast in the upcoming thriller Hide, and will be starring alongside Lee Bo-young. Reportedly, Lee will join the cast of Gyeongseong Creature in Season 2 of the series that was expected for release in 2024. More recently, Lee has been cast in Blood Free in the role of On San, premiering on Disney+ on April 10, 2024.

In 2025, Lee starred as Jin So-baek, the owner of the Jinkang Store, in the Netflix crime thriller television series As You Stood By.

== Personal life ==
Lee married his girlfriend in 2011 and they have two children, a son and a daughter.

== Filmography ==
=== Film ===
Year	Title	Role	Notes	Ref.
2006	See You After School	Joon-tae		
2007	Resurrection of the Butterfly			
2007	Our Town	Jung Myung-bo		
2009	Running Turtle	Detective Lee		
2009	The Sword With No Name	Sang-Hoon		
2010	Troubleshooter	interrogation prosecutor		
2010	A Long Visit	Joon-soo		
2011	Homicide Sonata			
2012	Sex, Lies and Videotape	Kyung-tae		
2012	Bloody Fight in Iron-Rock Valley	Chul-gi		
2012	Plump Revolution	Min-ho		
2013	Eating, Talking, Faucking	rapist		
2013	Oldmen Never Die	Joon-soo		
2014	The Suffered	Detective Lee		
2015	Hot Service: A Cruel Hairdresser	Ji Yang-bae		
2016	SORI: Voice from the Heart	NIS agent 1	Cameo	
2017	Fabricated City	Prosecutor	Cameo	
2018	Fengshui	Feng shui expert 1	Cameo	
2019	Money	Funeral hall manager	Cameo	
2019	The Faceless Boss	Cha Joon-young		
2020	The Faceless Boss: The Untold Story	Cha Joon-young		
2022	Broker	Seon-ho	Special appearance	
2023	Noryang: Deadly Sea	Konishi Yukinaga		
2024	Citizen of a Kind	Kim Yoon-gi		
2025	Run to the West	Mul-Gae		

=== Television series ===
Year	Title	Role	Notes	Ref.
2007	Behind the White Tower	Kwon Hyung-jin		
2009	Wife Returns	Director Lee		
2011	Special Affairs Team TEN	Ji Jin-hyuk		
2013	Special Affairs Team TEN 2	Ji Jin-hyuk	Cameo (ep.11-12)	
2013	Heartless City	Detective Kim Do-hoon		
2014	Secret Affair	Chief Lim		
2014	A Witch's Love	Detective Lee	Cameo (ep. 10,13)	
2015	My Beautiful Bride			
2016	Pied Piper	Prosecutor	Cameo (ep. 6)	
2017	Irish Uppercut	Do Tae-min	Main Role	
2017	The Idolmaster KR	Chief Yang		
2017	Prison Playbook	Lawyer Kang Min-koo		
2018	Something in the Rain	Jin Ah's boyfriend	Cameo (ep.15-16)	
2018	The Miracle We Met	Kim Choong-man		
2018	With Coffee	[Team Leader]		
2019	The Crowned Clown	Prince Jinpyung		
2019	One Spring Night	Nam Shi-hoon		
2019	Designated Survivor: 60 Days	Kim Nam-wook		
2019	Melting Me Softly	Jo Ki-beom		
2019–2020	Chocolate	Jeong Se-un		
2020	The World of the Married	Kim Yoon-ki		
2022	Thirty-Nine	Kim Jin-seok		
2022	Cleaning Up	Lee Young-shin		
2023	Maestra: Strings of Truth	Yoo Jung-jae		
2026	100 Days of Deception	Phillip Yoo		

=== Web series ===
Year	Title	Role	Notes	Ref.
2021	The Silent Sea	Chief Gong Soo-hyuk		
2022–2023	The Glory	Kang Yeong-cheon	Special appearance (Part 1–2)	
2024	Hide	Cha Seong-jae		
2024	Gyeongseong Creature	Captain Kuroko		
2024	Blood Free	On San		
2025	As You Stood By	Jin So-baek	Netflix	

== Stage ==
Theater performances
Year	Title		Role	Venue	Date	Ref.
Year	English	Korean	Role	Venue	Date	Ref.
2009	Hamlet Q1	햄릿Q1	Hamlet	Dongduk Women's University Performing Arts Centre	March 20 to 29	
2009	Culture of Youth Northern District 2009 Performance - Wuthering Height	젊음의 문화북구 2009기획공연 - 폭풍의 언덕	Hatton / Heathcliff (past)	Ulsan Buk-gu Culture and Arts Centre	June 27 to 28	
2011	Yasmin's first play "Meet the Gogol"	야스민의 첫 연극 <고골을 만나다>		Miari Village Theater, Daehakro Woosuk Repertory Theater	October 26 to 30	
2014	Now Gogol	나우 고골리		Seoul Arts Space (for the 35th Seoul Theater Festival)	May 3 to 4	
2016	Death of a Salesman	세일즈맨의 죽음	Biff Loman	Asian Culture Center	December 3–4	
2016	Death of a Salesman	세일즈맨의 죽음	Biff Loman	Arko Arts Theater	December 13–22	
2017	Death of a Salesman	세일즈맨의 죽음	Biff Loman	Daejeon Arts	January 13–14	
2017	Death of a Salesman	세일즈맨의 죽음	Biff Loman	Uijeongbu Arts	February 10–12	
2017	Death of a Salesman	세일즈맨의 죽음	Biff Loman	Suwon SK Atrium	February 17–18	
2017	Death of a Salesman	세일즈맨의 죽음	Biff Loman	Ulsan Culture	February 24–25	
2017	Death of a Salesman	세일즈맨의 죽음	Biff Loman	Gyeongju Arts	February 28 – March 1	
