= The Silent Sea =

The Silent Sea may refer to:

- The Silent Sea, a 2010 book in Clive Cussler's The Oregon Files,
- The Silent Sea, a 2021 television series.

The name is sometimes a reference to the Mare Tranquillitatis, a lunar mare.
