= Pretty Crazy =

2025 film by Lee Sang-geun

- Theatrical release poster
- Hangul: 악마가 이사왔다
- RR: Angmaga isawatda
- MR: Angmaga isawatta
- Directed by: Lee Sang-geun
- Written by: Lee Sang-geun
- Produced by: Kang Hye-jung; Ryoo Seung-wan; Jo Sung-min
- Starring: Lim Yoona; Ahn Bo-hyun; Sung Dong-il; Joo Hyun-young
- Cinematography: Kim Il-yeon
- Edited by: Lee Kang-hee
- Music by: Lee Ji-soo
- Production companies: Filmmaker R&K; Sanai Pictures
- Distributed by: CJ Entertainment
- Release date: August 13, 2025
- Running time: 115 minutes
- Country: South Korea
- Language: Korean
- Budget: ₩6.9 billion
- Box office: US$3.1 million

Pretty Crazy (Korean: 악마가 이사왔다; formerly titled 2 O'Clock Date (Korean: 2시의 데이트; RR: 2siui deiteu)) is a 2025 South Korean romantic comedy film directed by Lee Sang-geun, starring Lim Yoona and Ahn Bo-hyun. It tells the story of a woman from downstairs having an unimaginable secret, meeting the man from upstairs at 2 a.m., and having an extraordinary date, when everyone else in the building is asleep. The film was released in South Korea on August 13, 2025.

== Synopsis ==
After quitting his job, Gil-goo, a young and unemployed man who has been living a dull life at home, instantly falls for Seon-ji, the woman who moves into the apartment downstairs. But the next morning, he encounters a bizarre-looking version of Seon-ji in the elevator, leaving him shocked and confused between the sweet Seon-ji and the creepy one.

From that day on, driven by a mix of curiosity and fear about Seon-ji's true identity, Gil-goo starts lingering around her. Eventually, her father, Jang-soo, reveals the family's secret. Seon-ji is gentle and ordinary by day, but in the early hours, a demon awakens within her, turning her into a completely different person. Jang-soo offers Gil-goo a tough part-time job as Seon-ji's guardian during this time.

== Cast ==
- Lim Yoona as Jeong Seon-ji, a woman living downstairs who is lovely but has a secret beyond imagination
  - Lee Hyo-bi as young Jeong Seon-ji
- Ahn Bo-hyun as Gil-goo, an unemployed man living upstairs who spends time with Seon-ji
- Sung Dong-il as Jeong Jang-soo, Seon-ji's father
- Joo Hyun-young as Jeong Ara, Seon-ji's cousin
- Go Geon-han as Hee-beom, Gil-goo's friend
- Shin Hyun-soo as Young-sik

== Production ==
=== Casting ===
Initially, in September 2021, Lim Yoona and Kim Seon-ho were confirmed for the leading roles in the movie. In October 2021, Kim withdrew from the project due to an issue related to his private life. In December 2021, it was reported that Ahn Bo-hyun would star in the movie alongside Lim Yoona.

=== Filming ===
Principal photography began on April 28, 2022.

== Marketing ==
In May 2024, Lim Yoona and producer Ryoo Seung-wan attended a promotional booth that had been set up for the film during the 2024 Cannes Film Festival, invigorating the global promotion before the film's release.

== Accolades ==
Award	Year	Category	Recipient(s)	Result	Ref.
Blue Dragon Film Awards	2025	Best Actress	Lim Yoona	Nominated	
Blue Dragon Film Awards	2025	Chung Jung-won Popular Star Award	Lim Yoona	Won	
Blue Dragon Film Awards	2025	Best New Actor	Ahn Bo-hyun	Won	
Chunsa Film Art Awards	2025	Best Actress	Lim Yoona	Won	
Consumer Rights Day KCA Culture and Entertainment Awards	2025	2025 Viewers' Choice – Actress of the Year	Lim Yoona	Won	
