= Kim Do-wan =

South Korean actor and model (born 1995)

- 김도완
- Born: March 8, 1995 (age 31); Seoul, South Korea
- Education: Kaywon High School of Arts - Film the Arts; Sejong University
- Occupations: Actor; model
- Years active: 2017–present
- Agent: Namoo Actors
- Height: 1.86 m (6 ft 1 in)
- Relatives: Kim Tae-wan (brother)

Korean name
- Hangul: 김도완
- Hanja: 金度完
- RR: Gim Dowan
- MR: Kim Towan

Kim Do-wan (Korean: 김도완; born March 8, 1995) is a South Korean actor and model. He is best known for his roles in television series such as Start-Up (2020), My Roommate Is a Gumiho (2021), Big Mouth (2022), Wedding Impossible (2024), and One: High School Heroes (2025).

== Career ==
Kim is best known for his roles in Start-Up (2020), My Roommate Is a Gumiho (2021), and Wedding Impossible (2024).

In September 2024, Kim signed with new agency Namoo Actors.

== Filmography ==
=== Film ===
| Year | Title | Role | Ref. |
|---|---|---|---|
| 2018 | Cheese in the Trap | High school student #2 | |
| 2018 | Park Hwa-young | Sang-sik | |
| 2019 | Miss & Mrs. Cops | Sung Chan-young | |

=== Television series ===
| Year | Title | Role | Notes | Ref. |
|---|---|---|---|---|
| 2018 | Tempted | Yoo Joo-hwan | | |
| 2018 | Twelve Nights | Yoon Chan | | |
| 2019 | At Eighteen | Cho Sang-hoon | | |
| 2019 | Socialization – Understanding of Dance | Han Sang-jin | | |
| 2020 | How to Buy a Friend | Kwak Sang-pil | | |
| 2020 | She Knows Everything | Seo Tae-hwa | | |
| 2020 | Start-Up | Kim Yong-san | | |
| 2021 | My Roommate Is a Gumiho | Do Jae-jin | | |
| 2022 | Big Mouth | Park Chang-ho and Go Mi-ho's neighbor | Cameo (episode 2) | |
| 2024 | Wedding Impossible | Lee Do-han | | |
| 2025 | One: High School Heroes | Kang Yoon-ki | Main role | |

=== Web series ===
| Year | Title | Role | Ref. |
|---|---|---|---|
| 2017 | Seventeen | Ji Eun-woo | |
| 2017 | Seventeen: Special Edition | Ji Eun-woo | |
| 2017 | Yellow | Nam Ji-hoon | |
| 2018 | RE:PLAYLIST | Ji Eun-woo | |
| 2022 | I Haven't Done My Best Yet | Han Joo-hyuk | |
| 2023 | Doona! | Goo Jeong-hoon | |

=== Music video appearances ===
| Year | Title | Artist(s) | Role | Notes | Ref. |
|---|---|---|---|---|---|
| 2018 | "On the road" (길에서) | Yang Yo-seob | Ji Eun-woo | RE:PLAYLIST OST | |
| 2020 | "Hello" (안녕, 오늘의 그대에게) | Onestar | | | |
