= 365: Repeat the Year =

2020 South Korean television series

- Promotional poster
- Hangul: 365: 운명을 거스르는 1년
- Lit.: 365: One Year Against Destiny
- RR: 365: unmyeongeul geoseureuneun 1nyeon
- MR: 365: unmyŏngŭl kŏsŭrŭnŭn 1nyŏn
- Genre: Mystery; Fantasy
- Based on: Repeat by Kurumi Inui
- Developed by: Kim Sung-mo
- Written by: Lee Seo-yun; Lee Soo-kyung
- Directed by: Kim Kyung-hee
- Starring: Lee Joon-hyuk; Nam Ji-hyun; Kim Ji-soo; Yang Dong-geun
- Country of origin: South Korea
- Original language: Korean
- No. of episodes: 24 (Note: In order to circumvent Korean laws that prevent commercial breaks in the middle of an episode, what would previously have been aired as single 70 minute episodes are now being repackaged as two 35 minute episodes, with two episodes being shown each night with a commercial break between the two.)

Production
- Camera setup: Single-camera
- Running time: 35 minutes
- Production company: HB Entertainment

Original release
- Network: MBC TV
- Release: March 23 – April 28, 2020

Related
- Wheel of Fortune (NTV, 2018)

365: Repeat the Year (Korean: 365: 운명을 거스르는 1년) is a 2020 South Korean television series starring Lee Joon-hyuk, Nam Ji-hyun, Kim Ji-soo and Yang Dong-geun. Based on the 2004 novel Repeat by Japanese writer Kurumi Inui, it aired on MBC TV from March 23 to April 28, 2020, every Monday and Tuesday at 20:55 (KST).

== Synopsis ==
Ten people are given the possibility to go back in time, but mysterious events start to happen.

== Cast ==
=== Main ===
- Lee Joon-hyuk as Ji Hyung-joo

A veteran detective of the National Police Agency for 7 years and the partner of Park Sun-ho. He "resets" his life by one year after his partner was killed by a criminal.

- Nam Ji-hyun as Shin Ga-hyun

A webtoon artist of the webcomic series "Hidden Killer" for the past 3 years. She "resets" her life by one year after she suffered from an accident that left her in a wheelchair.

- Kim Ji-soo as Lee Shin

A psychiatrist who has experienced the "reset" at least six times to save her daughter.

=== Supporting ===
==== People who "reset" their lives ====
- Yang Dong-geun as Bae Jung-tae

An ex-convict who "resets" his life to earn money for his sister.

- Lee Si-a as Seo Yeon-soo

One of the ten people who "reset" their life. She "resets" her life after feeling guilt for causing Shin Ga-hyun's accident that left her in a wheelchair. She is later killed by Park Sun-ho which was disguised as an accidental death on the stairs.

- Yoon Joo-sang as Hwang No-seop

A cafe owner who is later revealed to be a professor in a hospital and the mastermind behind the "reset" project. He "resets" his life to experiment with the other nine candidates to see who survives. He is later arrested by Ji Hyung-joo in the next "reset".

- Im Ha-ryong as Choi Kyung-man

A security guard. He "resets" his life to earn money from lottery wins for his wife. He is later killed by Park Sun-ho which was disguised as a heart attack.

- Jung Min-sung as Cha Jeung-seok

A stockbroker. He "resets" his life to fix his mistakes on stock exchanges. He is later killed by Park Sun-ho which was disguised as a suicide.

- Ahn Seung-gyun as Go Jae-young

A pro-gamer and the son of the nominee for the Minister of Education. He "resets" his life to prevent his past from ruining his father's career. He is later killed by Park Sun-ho to frame his partner Ji Hyung-joo for murder.

- Lee Yoo-mi as Kim Se-rin

A university student who suffers from Munchausen syndrome. She "resets" her life to make up with her boyfriend. She is later killed by Park Sun-ho and her body was abandoned in a manhole.

==== National Police Agency ====
- Ryu Tae-ho as Heo Jang-il

A Police Captain of the National Police Agency and Ji Hyung-joo's superior.

- Lee Sung-wook as Park Sun-ho

A Police Lieutenant of the National Police Agency and Ji Hyung-joo's partner. He is revealed to be the serial killer detective and started killing after being promoted to Lieutenant during his 12-year service. He is later arrested by Ji Hyung-joo in the next "reset".

- Yoon Hye-ri as Jin Sa-kyung

A Police Lieutenant of the National Police Agency and Nam Soon-woo's partner.

- Ryeoun as Nam Soon-woo

A rookie police officer of the National Police Agency and Jin Sa-kyung's partner.

==== People around Shin Ga-hyun ====
- Min Do-hee as Min Joo-young

Shin Ga-hyun's best friend who cheated with Ga-hyun's boyfriend. She is later killed in a hit-and-run incident caused by Seo Yeon-soo's husband.

- Im Hyun-soo as Han Woo-jin

Shin Ga-hyun's boyfriend who cheated on her with Min Joo-young.

==== Others ====
- Kim Ha-kyung as So Hye-in

A florist and flower shop owner. She was a candidate for the "reset" but refused to participate after finding out she would not be pregnant at the time. She is later killed by Park Sun-ho which was disguised as an arson case.

- Sung Hyuk as Kim Dae-sung

Seo Yoon-soo's husband and the suspect in the hit-and-run case that left Shin Ga-hyun's friend Min Joo-young dead.

- Baek Soo-jang as Oh Myung-chul

A criminal that killed Park Sun-ho before the "reset". He is later arrested by Ji Hyung-joo after the "reset".

- Lee Chung-mi as Kim Se-rin's sister

Kim Se-rin's older sister.

- Oh Hee-joon as Goo Seung-min
- Lee Tae-vin as Choi Young-woong

=== Special appearances ===
- Yoo Gun as Ahn Gyeong-nam (Ep. 1–2)

A conman who underwent major surgery to avoid capture only to be arrested by Ji Hyung-joo by chance before the "reset".

- Jeon Seok-ho as Park Young-gil (Ep. 1–3)

A truck driver. He was killed during the "reset" since he was driving at the time.

== Original soundtrack ==
Singles from the soundtrack of the series released from March 24 to April 21, 2020, under the record label of Kakao M:

Part 1

Released on March 24, 2020
No.	Title	Lyrics	Music	Artist	Length
1.	"Paris"	Murmur	Murmur	Murmur	3:44
2.	"Paris" (Inst.)		Murmur		3:44
Total length:					7:28

Part 2

Released on March 31, 2020
No.	Title	Lyrics	Music	Artist	Length
1.	"Into My Life"	Major League	Major League	Say'Z	4:01
2.	"Into My Life" (Inst.)		Major League		4:01
Total length:					8:02

Part 3

Released on April 14, 2020
No.	Title	Lyrics	Music	Artist	Length
1.	"Looking For My Life" (또 다른 나를 찾아)	Park Se-joon; Han Joon	Jang Young-soo; 4Batter; Glody); Vulcan4	Noel	3:39
2.	"Looking For My Life" (Inst.)		Jang Young-soo; 4Batter; Glody); Vulcan4		3:39
Total length:					7:18

Part 4

Release on April 21, 2020
No.	Title	Lyrics	Music	Artist	Length
1.	"Come Inside"	Major League; Yang Dong-geun	Major League; Yang Dong-geun	Yang Dong-geun	3:38
2.	"Come Inside" (Inst.)		Major League; Yang Dong-geun		3:38
Total length:					7:16

== Viewership ==
Average TV viewership ratings
Ep.	Original broadcast date	Average audience share (Nielsen Korea)	
Ep.	Original broadcast date	Nationwide	Seoul
1	March 23, 2020	4.0% (NR)	4.2% (NR)
2	March 23, 2020	4.9% (NR)	5.3% (NR)
3	March 24, 2020	4.4% (NR)	—N/a
4	March 24, 2020	5.0% (NR)	5.2% (20th)
5	March 30, 2020	4.1% (NR)	—N/a
6	March 30, 2020	4.5% (NR)	—N/a
7	March 31, 2020	4.2% (NR)	—N/a
8	March 31, 2020	5.1% (20th)	5.7% (17th)
9	April 6, 2020	4.0% (NR)	—N/a
10	April 6, 2020	4.5% (NR)	—N/a
11	April 7, 2020	4.2% (NR)	—N/a
12	April 7, 2020	4.7% (NR)	—N/a
13	April 13, 2020	3.7% (NR)	—N/a
14	April 13, 2020	4.1% (NR)	—N/a
15	April 14, 2020	3.6% (NR)	—N/a
16	April 14, 2020	4.2% (NR)	—N/a
17	April 20, 2020	3.5% (NR)	—N/a
18	April 20, 2020	4.5% (NR)	—N/a
19	April 21, 2020	3.9% (NR)	—N/a
20	April 21, 2020	4.7% (NR)	—N/a
21	April 27, 2020	4.4% (NR)	—N/a
22	April 27, 2020	4.9% (NR)	—N/a
23	April 28, 2020	4.3% (NR)	—N/a
24	April 28, 2020	4.5% (NR)	—N/a
Average		4.3%	— (Note: Due to some ratings not recorded, the exact average rating is unknown.)
In the table above, the blue numbers represent the lowest ratings and the red numbers represent the highest ratings.; NR denotes that the drama did not rank in the top 20 daily programs on that date.; N/A denotes that the rating is not known.
