= Jeon Seok-ho =

South Korean actor (born 1984)

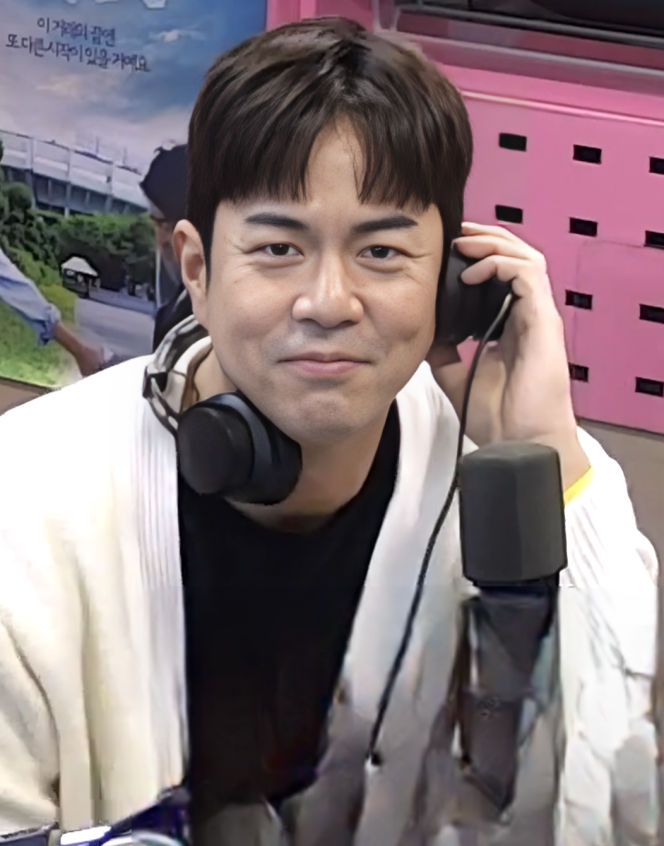
- Jeon in October 2022
- Born: May 2, 1984 (age 42); South Korea
- Education: Department of Theater and Film at Hanyang University
- Occupation: Actor
- Years active: 2000–present
- Agent: Ace Factory
- Spouse: Unknown (m. 2016)
- Children: Jeon Chae-yi

Korean name
- Hangul: 전석호
- RR: Jeon Seokho
- MR: Chŏn Sŏkho

Jeon Seok-ho (Korean: 전석호; born May 2, 1984) is a South Korean actor. He gained international recognition for his roles as the incompetent magistrate Cho Beom-pal in the series Kingdom and as Choi Woo-seok in Squid Game (2024–25).

His role in the series Hyena (2020) earned him a nomination for Best Supporting Actor at the Baeksang Arts Awards. He is also known for his performances in television series such as Misaeng: Incomplete Life (2014), The Good Wife (2016), and Strong Woman Do Bong-soon (2017). In addition to his screen work, Jeon is an active theater performer.

== Early life and education ==
Jeon was born on May 2, 1984. Influenced by his father, a dedicated cinephile, and a family friend who worked at the Sejong Center for the Performing Arts, Jeon was exposed to cinema and stage performance from a young age. He has noted that despite the family's modest financial circumstances, his parents encouraged him to pursue his interests freely.

In 1999, while attending an acting academy, Jeon responded to a newspaper advertisement for a minor role, which led him to the set of the 2000 film Just Do It. This role marked his screen debut. Around this time, inspired by films such as The Shawshank Redemption and American History X, he became interested in film direction. Although he soon left the academy due to financial difficulties, the experience introduced him to actress No Eun-ju and connected him with the theater community, where he discovered a passion for the craft.

In 2001, he appeared on television in the EBS drama School Story. He enrolled in the Department of Theater and Film at Hanyang University in 2003. Reflecting on his time there, he stated, "I fell in love with theater after meeting good professors and seniors," and subsequently decided to pursue acting as a career.

== Career ==
=== Early career in Travel series ===
In February 2010, Jeon and fellow Hanyang University alumni Park Dong-wook and director Park Seon-hee embarked on a one-month trip to India. Upon their return, they began collaborating on a theatrical project that would eventually be titled India Blog. The production premiered in June 2011 at the Yeonwoo Theater in the Daehakro district of Seoul and achieved significant commercial success.

Following the positive reception of this collaboration, the team reunited for the play Turkish Blues. This production depicts the story of two friends, a high school student and an older mentor, who reflect on their shared memories of music and their unrealized dreams of traveling to Turkey.

The creative partnership continued with a third production in 2013 titled Bulryeongseon. This play, co-directed by Park Seon-hee and Kim Byeong-ju, examines the historical life of independence activist Kim Sang-ok through the lens of a young man living in the modern era.

=== Film debut ===
In 2014, Jeon transitioned to feature films with his role in Director Noh Young-seok's film Intruders. Director Noh explained his decision to cast Jeon by noting that he specifically sought a less recognizable actor to prevent the audience from pre-judging the character based on a famous persona. He credited Jeon's naturalistic performance in the play India Blog as the primary reason for his selection. The film follows a pretentious traveler named Sang-jin, played by Jeon, who finds himself caught in a murder mystery while staying at a remote pension. The film was subsequently selected for screening at the Busan International Film Festival.

=== Return to television and theater ===
At the age of 31, Jeon gained broader recognition through the tvN series Misaeng: Incomplete Life. Based on the webtoon by Yoon Tae-ho, the drama aired in late 2014. He portrayed Ha Sung-joon, a department head known for his difficult treatment of subordinates. His performance was noted by critics for significantly increasing the emotional stakes and narrative immersion for viewers.

In the fall of the same year, Jeon joined the 63rd regular performance of the Yeonwoo Theater Company, Inside Himalaya. The production was staged at the Yeonwoo Small Theater in Hyehwa-dong, Jongno-gu, from August 14 to September 14. The play revolves around the stories of five men who share their experiences while traveling together in the Himalayas. This production marks the third work in the travel play series presented by director Park Seon-hee and the acting team, following India Blog and Turkish Blues. The cast included Kim Da-hin, Park Dong-wook, Jeon Seok-ho, Lim Seung-beom, and Kim Hyun-sik.

In 2015, Jeon auditioned for Oh Man-seok's revival of Sam Shepard's True West. Jeon was triple-cast as Lee alongside Kim Jun-won, and Lee Dae-il, alternating performances opposite Kim Seon-ho, Lee Hyun-wook and Moon Sung-il, who shared the role of Lee's brother, Austin. The production ranked first in Interpark sales as soon as bookings opened.

=== Breakthrough and international recognition ===
Jeon gained significant international attention for his role as Cho Beom-pal in the Netflix original series Kingdom, written by Kim Eun-hee. As the magistrate of Dongnae and the nephew of the powerful Cho Hak-ju, his character becomes an ally to the crown prince, played by Ju Ji-hoon. Jeon's portrayal as Cho was widely recognized for his character growth and the comedic levity he brought to the series throughout its two seasons.

In 2020, Jeon reunited with his Kingdom costar Ju Ji-hoon in the legal drama Hyena, portraying the character Ga Gi-hyuk. His performance earned him a nomination for Best Supporting Actor at the 56th Baeksang Arts Awards. He collaborated with Ju again in 2021 for the drama Jirisan, playing Kim Woong-soon, a local police officer.

In 2024 and 2005, Jeon appeared in the second and third season of Squid Game as Choi Woo-seok. He received praise from critics for his performance, particularly for his skillful comedic timing.

== Personal life ==
Jeon married in May 2016 after dating for ten years. He and his wife had a daughter, Jeon Chae-yi, on March 8, 2018; her name pays homage to Che Guevara.

== Filmography ==
=== Film ===
Year	Title	Role	Ref.
2000	Just Do It	Maeng-in	
2003	Singles	Jae-ho	
2011	Help Me	Hyeok-jin	
2014	Intruders	Sang-jin	
2016	Familyhood	Director Park	
2016	Seondal: The Man Who Sells the River	Yi Wan	
2016	Unwanted Brother	Jo Dong-hyun	
2017	Lucid Dream	Choi Kyung-hwan	
2017	Room No.7	detective Woo	
2018	After Spring	Seok-ho	
2018	Miss Baek	detective Bae	
2018	Passing Summer	In-gu	
2019	Miss & Mrs. Cops	detective Oh	
2019	Film Adventure	Seok-ho	
2020	Secret Garden (Independent Film)	Sang-woo	
2021	Sana-Hee Pure	Yoo	
2022	Special Delivery	Nam Ang-beol	
2022	Transaction Complete	Kwang-sung	
2023	Where Would You Like to Go?		
2023	The Roundup: No Way Out	Kim Yang-ho	
TBA	SAT, Secret of the Question	Ki Ki-su	
TBA	Amazon Whal Myung-soo	Manager Park	

=== Television series ===
Television series' appearances
Year	Title	Role	Notes	Ref.
2001	School Story	Student	Bit part	
2014	Misaeng: Incomplete Life	Ha Sung-jun	Supporting role	
2016	The Good Wife	Park Do-seob	Supporting role	
2017	Strong Girl Bong-soon	Secretary Gong	Supporting role	
2017	Han Yeo-reum's Memory	Contact accident driver	Cameo	
2017–2018	Jugglers	Park Jun-pyo	Cameo	
2018	Live	Jung-oh's sunbae	Cameo	
2018	The Miracle We Met	Detective Park Dong-su	Cameo	
2018	Life on Mars	Han Choong-ho	Supporting role	
2018	Familiar Wife		Cameo	
2019	My Fellow Citizens!	Kang Hyun-tae	Supporting role	
2019	Class of Lies	Lee Tae-seok	Supporting role	
2019–2020	Kingdom	Jo Bum-pal	Seasons 1–2	
2020	Chocolate	Dae-ho	Cameo (episode 2)	
2020	Hyena	Ga Ki-hyuk	Supporting role	
2020	365: Repeat the Year	Park Young-gil	Cameo (Episodes 1–3)	
2020	The Uncanny Counter	So Gwon	Cameo	
2021	Jirisan	Kim Woong-soon	Supporting role	
2021	Moebius: The Veil	Park Wang-eom	Supporting role	
2021–2022	School 2021	Lee Kang-hoon	Supporting role	
2022–2026	Yumi's Cells	Ahn Dae-young	Cameo (Season 2); Supporting role (Season 3)	
2023	Call It Love	Choi Sunwoo	Supporting role	
2023	Moving	Yoon Seong-wook	Supporting role	
2024	Blood Free	Seo Hui	Supporting role	
2024	Love Next Door	Yoon Myung-woo	Supporting role	
2024–2025	Squid Game	Choi Woo-seok	Season 2-3	
2026	Phantom Lawyer	Yun Bong-su	Supporting Role	

=== Television show ===
Television show's appearances
Year	Title	Role	Ref.
2015	Discovering Weekly Movies	Narrator	

== Stage ==
=== Musical ===
Musical play performance(s)
Year	Title		Role	Venue	Date	Ref.
Year	English	Korean	Role	Venue	Date	Ref.
2019	Cold Heart Part 2	차가운심장 Part2	Ejesil	Sowol Art Hall	December 7–29, 2019	

=== Theater ===
Theater play performance(s)
Year	Title		Role	Theater	Date	Ref.
Year	English	Korean	Role	Theater	Date	Ref.
2011	India Blog	인디아 블로그	Hyuk-jin	Yeonwoo Small Theatre	June 23 – August 28, 2011	
2011–2012	India Blog	인디아 블로그	Hyuk-jin	Daehak-ro T.O.M.2	December 8, 2011 – May 28, 2012	
2012	India Blog	인디아 블로그	Hyuk-jin	Gyeongseong University Yenoso Theatre Busan	June 29 to July 29	
2012	India Blog	인디아 블로그	Hyuk-jin	Daejeon Pyeongsong Youth Culture Centre Small Theatre	September 25 – October 7, 2012	
2013	Turkish Blues	터키 블루스	Lim Joo-hyuk	Yeonwoo Small Theatre	September 26 – November 3, 2013	
2013	Bulryeongseon	불령선인	Kim Sang-bok	NH Art Hall	November 28 – December 8, 2013	
2013	Bulryeongseon	불령선인	Kim Sang-bok	Cheonan Arts Centre Small Performance Hall	December 13–14, 2013	
2014	Inside Himalayas	인사이드 히말라야	Bob Dylan	Yeonwoo Small Theatre	August 14 – September 4, 2014	
2015	True West	트루웨스트	Lee	A Art Hall	August 13 – November 1, 2015	
2016	Turkish Blues	터키 블루스	Lim Joo-hyuk	Hongik University Daehakro Art Center	March 4 – April 10, 2016	
2016	India Blog	인디아 블로그	Hyuk-jin	Art One Theatre 3, Daehak-ro	January 8 – February 28, 2016	
2017	Latin America Quartet	라틴아메리카 콰르텟	Kim Han-min	Project Box Seeya	August 8–13, 2017	
2017–2018	Millennium Boys	밀레니엄 소년단	Jeon Myeong-gu	Dongsung Art Centre Dongsungso Theatre	December 1, 2017 – February 4, 2018	
2018	Doosan Humanities Theater 2018 Altruism - Nassim	두산인문극장 2018 이타주의자 - 낫심	—	Doosan Art Center Space111	April 10–29, 2018	
2018	Latin America Quartet	라틴아메리카 콰르텟	Kim Han-min	CKL Stage	July 6–15, 2018	
2020	Good Day to Read Hamlet	햄릿 읽기 좋은 날	Guest	Yeonwoo Small Theatre	February 19–29, 2020	
2021	India Blog	인디아 블로그	Hyuk-jin	Yeonwoo Small Theatre	January 14 – February 28, 2021	
2021	Club Berlin	클럽 베를린	Seok-ho	CJ Azit Daehakro	May 26 – June 19, 2021	
2022	Club Berlin	클럽 베를린	Seok-ho	CJ Azit Daehakro	June 26 – July 18, 2022	
2022	Latin America Quartet	라틴아메리카 콰르텟	Kim Han-min	CJ Azit Daehakro	July 1–24, 2022	

== Awards and nominations ==
Award	Year	Category	Nominated work	Result	Ref.
56th Baeksang Arts Awards	2020	Best Supporting Actor (TV)	Hyena	Nominated	
