= Blood Free =

2024 South Korean television series

- Promotional poster
- Hangul: 지배종
- Lit.: Dominant Species
- RR: Jibaejong
- MR: Chibaejong
- Genre: Sci-fi; Thriller; Drama
- Written by: Lee Soo-yeon
- Directed by: Park Chul-hwan
- Starring: Ju Ji-hoon; Han Hyo-joo; Lee Hee-joon; Lee Moo-saeng; Jeon Seok-ho; Park Ji-yeon; Kim Sang-ho
- Music by: Kim Joon-suk; Jeong Se-rin
- Ending theme: That's How My World Is Made by Natalie M
- Country of origin: South Korea
- Original language: Korean
- No. of episodes: 10

Production
- Executive producers: Kim Shin-ah; Kim Sung-hwi
- Producers: Min Hyun-il; Ahn Chang-hyun; Lee Sung-jin; Kim Chul-young; Park Jung-hoon
- Cinematography: Kim Tae-sung; Lee Young-woo
- Editor: Kim Na-young
- Production companies: Arc Media; Ace Factory; Blitzway Studios
- Budget: ₩24 billion

Original release
- Network: Disney+
- Release: April 10 – May 8, 2024

Blood Free (Korean: 지배종) is a 2024 South Korean sci-fi thriller drama television series written by Lee Soo-yeon, directed by Park Chul-hwan, and starring Ju Ji-hoon, Han Hyo-joo, Lee Hee-joon, Lee Moo-saeng, Jeon Seok-ho, Park Ji-yeon, and Kim Sang-ho. It was released worldwide on Disney+ from April 10, to May 8, 2024, every Wednesday.

== Synopsis ==
Humans have consumed animal meat for millions of years. BF, the biotechnology company that started the era of artificially cultured meat, dominates the market, and people who doubt the BF CEO's actions begin to appear one after another, both inside and outside.

== Cast and characters ==
=== Main ===
- Ju Ji-hoon as Woo Chae-woon

A former soldier and current bodyguard who graduated from Naval Academy.

- Han Hyo-joo as Yun Ja-yu

Founder and CEO of BF Group, a cell-cultured meat company that forms the central axis.

- Lee Hee-joon as Seonu Jae

The Prime Minister of South Korea.

- Lee Moo-saeng as On San

A physiologist who is a founding member of the BF Group and the general manager of culture media technology.

- Jeon Seok-ho as Seo Hui

An IT expert at BF Group.

- Park Ji-yeon as Jeong Hae-deun

A lawyer and head of planning at BF Group.

- Kim Sang-ho as Kim Sin-gu

A bioengineer who developed the core technology for artificial cultured meat.

=== Supporting ===
- Lee Seo as Hong Sae-ip

A member of the research team.

== Production ==
Blood Free was planned to have a total of 10 episodes. The budget for the series costed more than ₩24 billion (US$17.91 million) (Note: ₩2 billion (US$1.49 million) per episode.) in total.
