= Shim Wan-joon =

South Korean actor

- Born: Shim Wan-joon; 15 April 1980 (age 46); South Korea
- Other names: Sim Wan-jun, Sim Wan-joon, Sim Wan-jun
- Education: Seoul Institute of the Arts (Department of Theater)
- Occupation: Actor
- Years active: 2006-present
- Agent: BB Entertainment

Korean name
- Hangul: 심완준
- RR: Sim Wanjun
- MR: Sim Wanjun

Shim Wan-joon (born 1980) is a South Korean actor. He is known for his roles in Hi Bye, Mama!, Queen of Mystery and Tomorrow, With You.

== Filmography ==
=== Television series ===
Year	Title	Role	Ref.
2017	Queen of Mystery	Detective Ko	
2017	Duel	Detective Kang	
2018	While You Were Sleeping	Bearded man	
2018	Mr. Sunshine	Dong-mae's father	
2018	Sketch	Lee	
2019	Nokdu Flower	Jae-yun	
2019	My Country: The New Age	Ggae-kku	
2020	Hi Bye, Mama!	Shim Geum-jae	
2021	Beyond Evil	Kang Do-soo	
2022	Kill Heel	Park Jong-soo	
2022	Grid	Songje Police Station Detective	
2023	A Good Day to Be a Dog	P.E Teacher	
2024	Romance in the House	Yang Cheol-hong	
2024	Dongjae, the Good or the Bastard	Choi Kang-min	
2024	A Virtuous Business	Park In-tae	

=== Film ===
Year	Title	Role	Language	Ref.
2006	Hanbando	Navy CIC soldier	Korean	
2012	Bloody Fight in Iron-Rock Valley	Policeman	Korean	
2017	The King's Case Note	Fisherman	Korean	
2019	Man of Men	Construction Employee	Korean	
2019	The Beast	Man in black hood	Korean	
2019	A Little Princess	In-woo	Korean	
2020	Search Out	Jin-woo	Korean	
2020	Josée	Hye-seon's boyfriend	Korean	
2024	Citizen of a Kind	Information Team Leader	Korean	
2024	Dirty Money	Detective Team Leader	Korean	

== Awards and nominations ==
Name of the award ceremony, year presented, category, nominee of the award, and the result of the nomination
Award ceremony	Year	Category	Result	Nominee / Work	Ref.
11th Daehangno Festival Awards	2011	Best Male Actor	Won	Shim Wan-joon	
