= Shin Hyun-soo =

South Korean actor (born 1989)

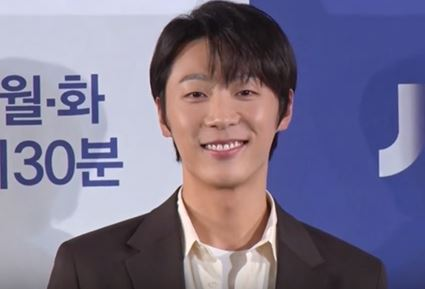
- Shin in 2019
- Born: July 8, 1989 (age 37); Incheon, South Korea
- Education: Dong Seoul University – Department of Acting
- Occupation: Actor
- Years active: 2014–present
- Agent: King Kong by Starship

Korean name
- Hangul: 신현수
- RR: Sin Hyeonsu
- MR: Sin Hyŏnsu

Shin Hyun-soo (Korean: 신현수; born July 8, 1989) is a South Korean actor. He began his career in acting through musicals before starring in television series.

== Biography ==
Shin was born in Incheon, South Korea and is an only child.

== Career ==
Shin graduated from Dong Seoul University's Department of Acting and made his debut in 2013 with the short film Department Store, and has built up solid acting skills through numerous performances, including the play Scarred Places and the musical Mr. Show.

In 2020, Shin had signed an exclusive contract with King Kong by Starship.

In April 2024, Shin formed the band, Kongaltan through a 12-episode YouTube show, along with fellow actors from King Kong by Starship, Shin Seung-ho, Son Woo-hyun, Han Min, and You Hyun-soo. The group held a two-day mini concert on December 7–8 at Shinhan Card SOL Pay Square, where Shin performed as the keyboardist. They released their debut single, "Snow Duck" on December 15.

In 2025, Shin appeared in the movie Pretty Crazy and JTBC variety show, The Gentlemen’s League as a regular member, joining Park Hang-seo team.

== Filmography ==
=== Film ===
Year	Title	Role	Notes	Ref.
2013	Department Store		Short Film	
2021	Unframed – Findy	Won-seok	Short Film Watcha	
2025	Pretty Crazy	Young-sik		
2026	Underground	Kwon Seung-hyun		
TBA	Veranda		Feature Film	

=== Television series ===
Key
†	Denotes television productions that have not yet been released

Year	Title	Role	Notes	Ref.
2015	My Beautiful Bride			
2015	Remember: War of the Son	Bae Chul-joo		
2016	Marrying My Daughter Twice			
2016	Thumping Spike	Lee Han-sol		
2016	Hello, My Twenties!	Yoon Jong-yeol		
2016	Thumping Spike 2	Lee Han-sol		
2017	Three Color Fantasy: "The Universe's Star"	Koo Se-joo		
2017	The Emperor: Owner of the Mask	Lee Chung-woon		
2017	Hello, My Twenties! 2	Yoon Jong-yeol		
2017	My Golden Life	Seo Ji-ho		
2018	Welcome to Waikiki	Phillip	Cameo (Episode 16)	
2018	Twelve Nights	Hyun Oh		
2018	KBS Drama Special'; Episode: "The Expiration Date of You and Me"	Lee Hyun-soo	One-act drama	
2019	Welcome to Waikiki 2	Guk Ki-bong		
2020	Mystic Pop-up Bar	Kim Do-young	Cameo (Episode 8)	
2020	KBS Drama Special; Episode: "The Reason Why I Can't Tell You"	Kim Ji-hoo	One-act drama	
2021	Bossam: Steal the Fate	Lee Dae-yeob		
2023	O'PENing: "Don't Press the Peach"	young Kim Kang-soo	One-act drama	
2024	O'PENing: "Our Beautiful Summer"	Coach	Special Appearance	
2025	My Dearest Nemesis	Seo Ha-jin's ex-husband	Cameo (Episode 10)	
2026	Filing for Love	Kwon Hyun-woo	Special Appearance	
2026	A Bona Fide Killer	Seul-gi (Sergey)		
2026	One-of-a-Kind Romance †	Kang Hee-soo		

=== Web series ===
Year	Title	Role	Notes	Ref.
2022	X of Crisis	Andy Jung		
2023	Duty After School	Lee Chun-ho		
2024	Branding in Seongsu	Kim Jin-seok	Special appearance (Episode 1-4)	
2025	One: High School Heroes	Kim Su-gyeom		

=== Television shows ===
Year	Title	Role	Notes	Ref.
2025	The Gentlemen's League 4	Regular Member		

== Stage ==
Musical play performances
Year	Title		Role	Theater	Date	Ref.
Year	English	Korean	Role	Theater	Date	Ref.
2014	Hoy Style Magazine Show	호이 스타일 매거진 쇼		Daehakro TOM 1	November 24, 2014	
2015	Wedding Fantasy	웨딩 판타지	Kim Cheol-su	Jizzel Small Theater	December 19, 2015 - December 30, 2015	
2016	Wedding Fantasy	웨딩 판타지	Kim Cheol-su	Daehakro Star City Casino Hall (Former Tiny Alley)	January 2, 2016 - January 31, 2016	
2016	Wedding Fantasy	웨딩 판타지	Kim Cheol-su	Yundang Art Hall 2	February 12, 2016 - April 30, 2016	
2017	Wedding Fantasy	웨딩 판타지	Kim Cheol-su	Daehakro Art Space Hyehwa	December 2, 2016 - January 1, 2017	

=== Theater ===
Theater play performances
Year	Title		Role	Theater	Date	Ref.
Year	English	Korean	Role	Theater	Date	Ref.
2013	Sunset Theater	노을소극장				
2013	Ogi	오기		Dongsoo Small Theater		
2013	Catholic Youth Center/Dari CY Theater	카톨릭청년회관/다리CY씨어터				
2014	Wounded Places	상처 난 자리들	Jung-woo			
2014	Mr. Show	미스터쇼	Justin	Shinhan Card SOL Pay Square	March 27, 2014 - July 26, 2014	
2014	Mr. Show	미스터쇼	Justin	Busan Cinema Center Sky Theater	August 15, 2014 - August 17, 2014	
2014	Mr. Show	미스터쇼	Justin	EXCO West Wing 5th Floor Auditorium	August 22, 2014 - August 24, 2014	
2014	Mr. Show	미스터쇼	Justin	CJB Media Center Art Hall	August 30, 2014 - August 31, 2014	
2014	Mr. Show	미스터쇼	Justin	CMB Expo Art Hall	September 12, 2014 - September 14, 2014	
2014	Mr. Show	미스터쇼	Justin	Suwon SK Artrium Grand Theater	September 19, 2014 - September 21, 2014	
2014	Mr. Show	미스터쇼	Justin	Seongnam Arts Center Opera House	October 4, 2014 - October 5, 2014	
2024	Me and My Grandfather	나와 할아버지	Jun-hee	the Scone 2nd Hall of the Seokyeong University Performing Arts Center	September 24, 2024 – November 24, 2024	
2026	Me and My Grandfather	나와 할아버지	Jun-hee	Yes24 Art One Hall	September 11, 2026 – November 2, 2026	

== Discography ==
=== Singles ===
Title	Year	Peak chart positions	Album	Ref.
Title	Year	KOR Hot	Album	Ref.
"Waikiki (Actors Ver.)" (with Lee Yi-kyung, Kim Seon-ho)	2019	—	Welcome to Waikiki 2 OST	
"Snow Duck" (눈오리) (KONGLATAN Project)	2024	—	Snow Duck Singles	

== Awards and nominations ==
Name of the award ceremony, year presented, category, recipient of the award and the result of the nomination
Award	Year	Category	Recipient	Result	Ref.
Asia Artist Awards	2016	Rising Star Award	Shin Hyun-soo	Won	
Asia Artist Awards	2017	New Wave Award	Shin Hyun-soo	Won	
Asia Artist Awards	2018	Focus Award	Shin Hyun-soo	Won	
