= Special Affairs Team TEN =

2011–2013 South Korean crime television series

- Promotional poster (Season 1)
- Also known as: TEN; Special Crimes Force TEN
- Genre: Police procedural Crime; Mystery; Thriller
- Written by: Nam Sang-wook (season 1-2); Lee Jae-gon (season 1)
- Directed by: Lee Seung-young
- Starring: Joo Sang-wook; Jo An; Kim Sang-ho; Choi Woo-shik
- Country of origin: South Korea
- Original language: Korean
- No. of seasons: 2
- No. of episodes: Season 1 – 9 Season 2 – 12

Production
- Production location: Korea
- Running time: Fridays at 24:00 (season 1); Sundays at 23:00 (season 2)
- Production company: MBC C&I

Original release
- Network: OCN
- Release: 18 November 2011 – 30 June 2013

Special Affairs Team TEN (Korean: 특수사건전담반 TEN; RR: Teuksusageonjeondamban TEN; also known simply as TEN) is a South Korean crime procedural television series starring Joo Sang-wook, Jo An, Kim Sang-ho and Choi Woo-shik. It was broadcast by cable channel OCN.

Season 1 aired from November 18, 2011 to January 13, 2012 on Fridays at 24:00 for 9 episodes. It was a hit on Korean cable, reaching a peak viewership rating of 3.91%. It also won the Grand Prize (Daesang) at the 6th Cable TV Broadcasting Awards in 2012.

Season 2 aired from April 14 to June 30, 2013 on Sundays at 23:00 for 12 episodes.

== Series overview ==
Season	Episodes	Originally released		Time slot
Season	Episodes	First released	Last released	Time slot
1	9	November 18, 2011	January 13, 2012	Fridays at 24:00 (KST)
2	12	April 14, 2013	June 30, 2013	Sundays at 23:00 (KST)

== Season 1 ==
=== Plot ===
"Special Affairs Team TEN" is a criminal investigation unit that tackles the most violent, hardcore crimes in South Korea. These crimes usually have less than a 10% rate for arrests. Following the motto of "No more unsolved cases," the detectives chase those who attempt to commit the perfect crime, facing some of the most twisted and perverted criminals that they have ever encountered in their careers.

Yeo Ji-hoon (Joo Sang-wook) was a former ace detective with keen deductive powers and a strong logical mind, who now works as a police academy instructor. But he gives up teaching crime-solving to get back into the field after the brutal murder of his wife. Called "the monster who catches monsters" for thinking like his targets, Ji-hoon is tasked to be the lead investigator of the special task force TEN. The team includes: Nam Ye-ri (Jo An), a profiling specialist; Baek Do-shik (Kim Sang-ho), a veteran cop who possesses a keen sense of intuition, which he honed from 24 years on the job, and who good-naturedly chides the team to always treat people like human beings; and Park Min-ho (Choi Woo-shik), a "pretty boy" rookie who impressed Ji-hoon in class, and is the man on the ground who does all the running and grunt work.

=== Cast ===
- Joo Sang-wook as Yeo Ji-hoon
- Jo An as Nam Ye-ri
- Kim Sang-ho as Baek Do-shik
- Choi Woo-shik as Park Min-ho
- Kim Hae-in as Kim Eun-young/Seo Eun-bi (ep 1)
- Oh Min-suk as Kim Sun-woo, manager of Queen's Nest (ep 4)
- Oh Chang-seok as Seung Yi-han (ep 4)
- Jang In-sub as Kim Yoon-seok
- Yoon Ji-hye as Seo Yoo-rim
- Choi Min as Gwangsoo unit detective
- Kim Ji-young as Min Chae-won
- Kim Moon-ho as Sal In-ja
- Oh Hee-joon as young cop
- Choi Beom-ho as Bureau chief Jung Woo-shik
- Min Woo-ki as panty man
- Kahlid Elijah Tapia as Jason
- Park Byung-eun
- Lee Moo-saeng as Ji Jin-hyeok

== Season 2 ==
=== Plot ===
Yeo Ji-hoon has suddenly disappeared. The other members of the team, Baek Do-shik, Nam Ye-ri and Park Min-ho are initially confused by the situation, but they soon find a message which explains Ji-hoon's intentions. Team TEN then chases after a serial killer known as "Murderer F." As they get closer to Murderer F, they are in for a shock.

=== Cast ===
- Joo Sang-wook as Yeo Ji-hoon
- Jo An as Nam Ye-ri
- Kim Sang-ho as Baek Do-shik
- Choi Woo-shik as Park Min-ho
- Yoon Ji-hye as Seo Yoo-rim
- Choi Jae-woong as Shin Young-geun
- Yoo Jae-myung as chief
- Oh Seung-yoon as Shim Yi-ho (ep 3)
- Kim Hyun-sung as Kang Jong-yoon (ep 4-5)
- Lee Hyun-kyung as Choi Sang-hee (ep 6)
- Jung So-young as Yang Sun-hwa (ep 6)
- Kang Sung-min as Do Sung-gyu (ep 6)
- Jung Hye-sung as Bae Seo-yeon (ep 7)
- Lee Hee-jin as Song Hwa-young (ep 8)
- Jang Won-young as Park Eun-soo (ep 8)
- Song Yoo-ha as Kang Jin-wook (ep 8)
- Jang In-sub as Kim Yoon-uk (ep 8)
- Min Sung-wook as Jang Seok-beom (ep 9)
- Kang Ki-hwa as Lee Ji-soo (ep 9)
- Im Seung-dae as Ji-soo's husband (ep 9)
- Choi Song-hyun as Yoon Seo-hyun (ep 9)
- Sung Ji-ru as Ma Seok-gi (ep 11-12)
- Lee Moo-saeng as Ji Jin-hyuk (ep 11-12)
- Lee Jun-hyeok
