= One: High School Heroes =

2025 South Korean television series

- Promotional poster
- Hangul: ONE : 하이스쿨 히어로즈
- RR: ONE : Haiseukul hieorojeu
- MR: ONE : Haisŭk'ul hiŏrojŭ
- Genre: Action; Coming-of-age
- Based on: One by Lee Eun-jae
- Written by: Kim Young-eun
- Directed by: Lee Seong-tae
- Starring: Lee Jung-ha; Kim Do-wan
- Music by: Noh Hyeong-woo
- Country of origin: South Korea
- Original language: Korean
- No. of episodes: 8

Production
- Production companies: Covenant Pictures; Very Good Studio

Original release
- Network: Wavve
- Release: May 30 – June 13, 2025

One: High School Heroes (Korean: ONE: 하이스쿨 히어로즈) is a 2025 South Korean action coming-of-age television series directed by Lee Seong-tae, starring Lee Jung-ha and Kim Do-wan. It premiered on Wavve from May 30, to June 13, 2025.

== Premise ==
A school action drama that tells the tale of a model student who once focused solely on his studies but becomes involved in bullying at school and domestic abuse, forcing him to make a life-changing choice. A group known as "High School Heroes" is made up of the major characters who defend the victims of school violence.

== Cast ==
=== Main ===
- Lee Jung-ha as Kim Ui-gyeom, a transfer student who has a natural fighting ability. When he opens his eyes to fighting and starts using violence, he subdues the school's bullies one by one. Previously, he was regarded as the most popular and kind student in the entire school.
- Kim Do-wan as Kang Yoon-ki, who joins Kim Ui-gyeom to form High School Heroes. He is credited with spotting Kim Ui-gyeom's innate fighting ability and guiding him into combat while concealing his intentions. He is an active member of High School Heroes because of his excellent fighting skills and ability to make snap decisions.

=== Supporting ===
- Kim Sang-ho as Kim Seok-tae, a loving father and a prosperous medical equipment businessman, but strictly disciplines Ui-gyeom to become a doctor.
- Kim Joo-ryoung as Myung Da-bin, Kim Ui-gyeom's mother. She gradually changes to protect her son from her husband's oppressive educational methods.
- Shin Hyun-soo as Kim Soo-kyum, Kim Ui-gyeom's older brother
- Im Sung-kyun as Kim Seung-jun
- Lim Hyun-tae as Choi Hong-il
- Yuk Jun-seo as Lee Gul-jae, a mysterious transfer student
- Yoo Hee-je as Choi Gi-soo, a powerful opponent who threatens the heroes.
- Shin Jae-hwi as Ki-yeon
- Hong Min-gi as Kim Nam-hyeop, a second-year student at Seomun High School. His father is a medical school professor.
- Shin Jun-seop as Nam Seung-sik, a third-year student who took over the school with jiu-jitsu.
- Kim Jong-gu as Ui-gyeom's grandfather
- Lee Chan-hyeong as Seong-wook
- Yoon Hyun-soo as Ji-sung

== Episodes ==
No.	Episode Title	Original release date
1	"Walkman"	May 30, 2025
2	"Emergency Room"	May 30, 2025
3	"Privileges"	May 30, 2025
4	"Hero Mask"	May 30, 2025
5	"High School Superheroes"	June 6, 2025
6	"Bad Guy"	June 6, 2025
7	"Dream"	June 13, 2025
8	"Heroes"	June 13, 2025

== Production ==
Filming for One: High School Heroes began in August 2023 and was completed in 2024.

== Release ==
One: High School Heroes was released on May 30, 2025, on Wavve.
