= Kim Sang-ho (actor) =

South Korean actor (born 1970)

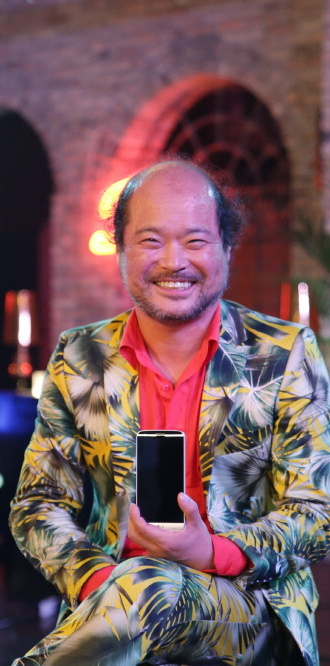
- Kim in 2016
- Born: July 24, 1970 (age 56); Gyeongju, North Gyeongsang Province, South Korea
- Occupation: Actor
- Years active: 1994–present
- Agent: Just Entertainment

Korean name
- Hangul: 김상호
- Hanja: 金尙昊
- RR: Gim Sangho
- MR: Kim Sangho
- Website: Kim Sang-ho

Kim Sang-ho (born July 24, 1970) is a South Korean actor. He appears in film, television and theater. Kim won Best Supporting Actor at the 2007 Blue Dragon Film Awards for his performance in The Happy Life.

== Filmography ==
Key
| † | Denotes films that have not yet been released |

=== Film ===
| Year | Title | Role |
|---|---|---|
| 2001 | The Last Witness | Escaped prisoner |
| 2003 | Mutt Boy | Jang-son |
| 2004 | The Big Swindle | 휘발류 ("Petrol") |
| 2005 | The President's Last Bang | KCIA agent Jang |
| 2005 | She's on Duty | Detective Kang |
| 2005 | You Are My Sunshine | Kim Kyung-bae |
| 2006 | Over the Border | Drunk (cameo) |
| 2006 | Detective Mr. Gong | Detective Ji |
| 2006 | Lump Sugar | Chief Hong |
| 2006 | Between Love and Hate | Director Jeon |
| 2006 | Tazza: The High Rollers | Park Mu-seok |
| 2007 | The Old Garden | Geon |
| 2007 | The Happy Life | Hyuk-soo |
| 2007 | Le Grand Chef | Woo |
| 2007 | Bank Attack | Delivery man |
| 2008 | His Last Gift | Yong-tae |
| 2008 | Boy Director | Village head |
| 2009 | A Million | Removal services squad leader |
| 2009 | A Good Rain Knows | President Ji |
| 2009 | Jeon Woo-chi: The Taoist Wizard | Priest |
| 2010 | Blades of Blood | Park Dol-seok (cameo) |
| 2010 | Moss | Jeon Seok-man |
| 2011 | Heartbeat | Team leader Jo |
| 2011 | In Love and War | Mr. Baek |
| 2011 | Moby Dick | Son Jin-ki |
| 2011 | Champ | Sheriff |
| 2011 | Punch | Middle-aged man from the house in front |
| 2013 | Running Man | Ahn Sang-ki |
| 2013 | Hope | Gwang-shik |
| 2014 | Sea Fog | Ho-young |
| 2015 | Wonderful Nightmare | Chief Lee |
| 2015 | The Beauty Inside | Woo-jin |
| 2015 | The Tiger: An Old Hunter's Tale | Chil-gu |
| 2016 | Will You Be There? | Tae-ho |
| 2016 | Proof of Innocence | Kwon Soon-tae |
| 2017 | Fabricated City | Ma Deok-soo |
| 2017 | Ordinary Person | Chu Jae-jin |
| 2018 | The Negotiation | Ahn Hyuk-soo |
| 2018 | The Witness | Detective Jae-yeop |
| 2018 | Yakiniku Dragon | Yong-gil |
| 2019 | By Quantum Physics: A Nightlife Venture | Park Gi-heon |
| 2019 | Shades of the Heart | Sung-ha |
| 2020 | The Golden Holiday | Kim Yong-Bae |
| 2023 | Road to Boston | Baek Nam-hyeon |
| TBA | Song of the Sun † | |

=== Television series ===
| Year | Title | Role | Notes/Ref. |
|---|---|---|---|
| 2008 | The Kingdom of the Winds | Ma-hwang | |
| 2009 | Triple | Coach Nam | |
| 2010 | Prosecutor Princess | Na Joong-seok | |
| 2011 | Twinkle Twinkle | Park Joong-hyuk | |
| 2011 | City Hunter | Bae Shik-joong / Bae Man-deok | |
| 2011 | Special Affairs Team TEN | Baek Do-shik | |
| 2012 | My Husband Got a Family | Bang Jung-bae | |
| 2013 | Special Affairs Team TEN | Baek Do-shik | Season 2 |
| 2013 | The Blade and Petal | So Sa-beon | |
| 2014 | Wonderful Days | Kim Ssang-shik | |
| 2014 | Doctor Stranger | Yang Jeong-han | |
| 2014 | KBS Drama Special "Illegal Parking" | Ahn Sang-shik | one act-drama |
| 2015 | D-Day | Choi Il-seop | |
| 2016 | Bring It On, Ghost | Monk Myung-cheol | |
| 2016 | Lucky Romance | Won Dae-hae | |
| 2017 | Missing 9 | Hwang Jae-Guk | |
| 2017 | The Guardians | Oh Kwang-ho | |
| 2019 | Nokdu Flower | Choi Deok-Ki | |
| 2020 | Alice | Go Hyeon-seok | |
| 2021 | L.U.C.A.: The Beginning | Choi Jin-hwan | |
| 2021 | Reflection of You | Yoon Sang-ho | |
| 2022 | Insider | Mok Jin-hyung | |
| 2022 | Bad Prosecutor | Park Jae-kyung | |
| 2023 | Not Others | Park Sang-goo | |
| 2023 | The Kidnapping Day | Park Cheol-won | |
| 2024 | Hide | Baek Min-yeop | |
| 2025 | The Haunted Palace | Pung-san | |
| 2025 | Second Shot at Love | Han Jung-soo | |
| 2025 | One: High School Heroes | Kim Seok-tae | |
| 2025 | Shin's Project | Kim Sang-geun | |
| 2025 | Typhoon Family | Pyo Bak-ho | |
| 2026 | Fifties Professionals † | Jo Sung-won | |

=== Web series ===
| Year | Title | Role | Notes | Ref. |
|---|---|---|---|---|
| 2019–2020 | Kingdom | Moo-yeong | Season 1–2 | |
| 2020 | Sweet Home | Han Du-sik | Season 1 | |
| 2021 | My Name | Cha Ki-ho | | |
| 2022 | Rookie Cops | Cha Yoo-gon | | |
| 2022 | Kiss Sixth Sense | Director | (Cameo, Ep. 12) | |
| 2022 | May It Please the Court | Shin Chi-sik | | |
| 2024 | Blood Free | Kim Shin-gu | | |

=== Variety shows ===
| Year | Title | Role | Notes | Ref. |
|---|---|---|---|---|
| 2018–2019 | Village Survival, the Eight | Cast Member | Season 1 – 2 | |
| 2021 | The Power of Superfood | Main Cast | documentary | |

== Theater ==
| Year | Title | Role |
|---|---|---|
| 1996 | 먼지아기 | |
| 1996 | 오필리어 (Ophelia) | |
| 1998 | 지상으로부터 20미터 | |
| 2003 | 종로고양이 | |
| 2003 | 어무이 어무이요 | |
| 2003 | 인류 최초의 키스 (A First Kiss in Human History) | |
| 2004 | 남자충동 (Men's Impulse) | |

== Accolades ==
=== Awards and nominations ===
Awards and nominations
| Year | Award | Category | Nominated work | Result | Ref. |
|---|---|---|---|---|---|
| 2007 | 28th Blue Dragon Film Awards | Best Supporting Actor | The Happy Life | Won | |
| 2011 | 4th Korea Drama Awards | Best Supporting Actor | City Hunter, Twinkle Twinkle | Nominated | |
| 2011 | 48th Grand Bell Awards | Best Supporting Actor | Moby Dick | Nominated | |
| 2012 | KBS Drama Awards | Best Supporting Actor | My Husband Got a Family | Won | |
| 2018 | 2nd The Seoul Awards | Best Supporting Actor (Film) | The Witness | Nominated | |
| 2020 | 28th SBS Drama Awards | Best Supporting Actor | Alice | Nominated | |

=== Listicles ===
Name of publisher, year listed, name of listicle, and placement
| Publisher | Year | Listicle | Placement | Ref. |
|---|---|---|---|---|
| Korean Film Council | 2021 | Korean Actors 200 (Note: Introduces 200 actors that best represent the present and future of Korean cinema to the people in the film industry all over the world.) | Included | |
