= Wedding Impossible =

2024 South Korean television series

- Promotional poster
- Hangul: 웨딩 임파서블
- RR: Weding impaseobeul
- MR: Weding imp'asŏbŭl
- Genre: Romantic comedy
- Based on: Wedding Impossible by Song Jung-won
- Developed by: Studio Dragon (planning)
- Written by: Park Seul-gi; Oh Hye-won
- Directed by: Kwon Young-il
- Starring: Jeon Jong-seo; Moon Sang-min; Kim Do-wan; Bae Yoon-kyung
- Music by: Lim Ha-young
- Country of origin: South Korea
- Original language: Korean
- No. of episodes: 12

Production
- Executive producers: Jang Sin-ae (CP; Park In-sun; Yoo Hye-min
- Producers: Yoon Shin-ae; Go Hyun-seok; Kim Je-hyun; Yoo Sang-won; Choi Dong-suk; Kim Ha-kyung
- Cinematography: Bin Tae-hwan
- Editor: Choi Joong-won
- Camera setup: Single-camera
- Running time: 70 minutes
- Production companies: Studio Dragon; Studio 329

Original release
- Network: tvN
- Release: February 26 – April 2, 2024

Wedding Impossible (Korean: 웨딩 임파서블) is a 2024 South Korean television series starring Jeon Jong-seo, Moon Sang-min, Kim Do-wan, and Bae Yoon-kyung. The series is based on the web novel of the same title written by Song Jung-won and illustrated by Lee Chung. It aired on tvN from February 26 to April 2, 2024, every Monday and Tuesday at 20:50 (KST). It is also available for streaming on TVING in South Korea, and on Viki and Amazon Prime Video in selected regions.

== Synopsis ==
In this romantic drama, conflicting desires and opposition to a proposed marriage take center stage. When wealthy heir Lee Do-han suggests a sham marriage to the relatively unknown actress Na A-jeong, she seizes the chance despite Do-han's homosexuality. Complications arise when Do-han's ambitious younger brother, Lee Ji-han, intervenes to thwart the relationship, unable to bear witness to the unfolding of their fictitious marriage.

== Cast and characters ==
=== Main ===
- Jeon Jong-seo as Na A-jeong

A minor actress whose acting skills were at the peak level but her recognition level was at a low level. She is offered a fake marriage mission as Do-han's wife and the daughter-in-law of a conglomerate.

- Moon Sang-min as Lee Ji-han

A third-generation chaebol and the last grandson of LJ Group who lives quietly and faithfully with the ambition to make his older brother the heir to the conglomerate.

- Kim Do-wan as Lee Do-han

A-jeong's friend and Ji-han's older brother. He is a perfect man with the best heart, ability, and family, but due to a secret that cannot be told to anyone, he is refusing to be a successor.

- Bae Yoon-kyung as Yoon Chae-won

CEO of Taeyang Corporation. She is noble from her birth to her deeds, and is someone that Ji-han is eyeing as a prospective sister-in-law.

=== Supporting ===
==== Ji-han's family ====
- Kwon Hae-hyo as Hyun Dae-ho

Ji-han and Do-han's grandfather who is chairman of LJ Group.

- Park Ah-in as Choi Seung-ah

Ji-han's half-sister who is a managing director of LJ Department Store.

- Hong In as Choi Min-woong

Ji-han's half brother who is executive director of LJ Hotel.

- Kim Ye-won as Ahn Se-jin

Min-woong's wife.

==== A-jeong's family ====
- Kim Soo-jin as Seo Dong-ok

A-jeong's mother.

- Kim Kwang-kyu as Na Dae-sub

A-jeong's father.

- Moon Seung-you as Na Su-jeong

A-jeong's younger sister.

- Kim Young-hoon as Cho Tae-min

A-jeong's brother-in-law.

- Seo Woo-jin as Cho Ji-o

A-jeong's nephew.

==== People around A-jeong ====
- Song Sang-eun as Yang Ji-ae

A-jeong's colleague who runs a cafe as a side job.

- Kang Na-eon as Yoo Jung-hee

A-jeong's colleague and rookie artist.

- Joo Hyun-young as Hong Na-ri

A-jeong's former classmate and rival, now a successful actress.

==== People around Ji-han ====
- Min Jin-woong as Eun Tak

Ji-han's boss who is a planning team leader at the company while hiding his identity.

- Jung Hee-tae as Kim Min-seop

Dae-ho's secretary.

- Shin Mun-seong as Kang Ik-jun

A reporter.

- Shin Young-beom as Jung Tae-hyun

Do-han's acquaintance.

=== Special appearances ===
- Kang Hyung-suk as Kim Ho-tae
- Jung Kyung-ho as Yoon Chae-won's date
- Han Soo-yeon as Su-hyeon

Ji-han's mother.

- Lee Soo-hyuk
- Kim Bum
- Ryu Kyung-soo

== Production ==
On April 11, 2023, the production team announced that filming for the series was halted due to the sudden death of actress Jung Chae-yul who died on that day. On April 13, an official confirmed that filming would resume on that day, and the production team decided to find a replacement for the late actress after much deliberation.

== Viewership ==
Wedding Impossible : South Korea viewers per episode (thousands)

Season	Episode number												Average
Season	1	2	3	4	5	6	7	8	9	10	11	12	Average
1	938	842	893	852	851	741	769	757	722	448	566	747	761

Source: Audience measurement performed nationwide by Nielsen Korea.

Average TV viewership ratings
Ep.	Original broadcast date	Average audience share (Nielsen Korea)	
Ep.	Original broadcast date	Nationwide	Seoul
1	February 26, 2024	4.004% (1st)	4.441% (1st)
2	February 27, 2024	4.066% (1st)	4.651% (1st)
3	March 4, 2024	4.054% (1st)	4.569% (1st)
4	March 5, 2024	3.986% (1st)	3.914% (2nd)
5	March 11, 2024	3.671% (1st)	3.718% (1st)
6	March 12, 2024	3.485% (1st)	3.759% (1st)
7	March 18, 2024	3.503% (1st)	3.576% (1st)
8	March 19, 2024	3.394% (2nd)	3.629% (2nd)
9	March 25, 2024	3.130% (1st)	3.422% (1st)
10	March 26, 2024	2.229% (1st)	2.236% (2nd)
11	April 1, 2024	2.800% (1st)	3.093% (1st)
12	April 2, 2024	3.666% (1st)	4.184% (1st)
Average		3.499%	3.766%
In the table above, the blue numbers represent the lowest ratings and the red numbers represent the highest ratings.; This series aired on a cable channel/pay TV which normally has a relatively smaller audience compared to free-to-air TV/public broadcasters (KBS, SBS, MBC, and EBS).
