= Intruders (2013 film) =

2013 film

- Film poster
- Hangul: 조난자들
- RR: Jonanjadeul
- MR: Chonanjadŭl
- Directed by: Noh Young-seok
- Written by: Noh Young-seok
- Produced by: Choi Sun-hee
- Starring: Suk-ho Jun
- Cinematography: Park Jae-in
- Edited by: Park Soo-dan
- Production company: StONEwork
- Distributed by: CJ Entertainment
- Release dates: 6 September 2013 (TIFF); 6 March 2014 (South Korea)
- Running time: 99 minutes
- Country: South Korea
- Language: Korean

Intruders (Korean: 조난자들) is a 2013 South Korean film written and directed by Noh Young-seok. It was screened in the Contemporary World Cinema section at the 2013 Toronto International Film Festival.

== Cast ==
- Jeon Seok-ho as Sang-jin, a pretentious traveler stranded in a pension.
- Oh Tae-kyung as Hak-soo, a kind ex-convict.
- Choi Moo-sung as a mysterious police officer.

== Critical response ==
Andrew Chan of the Film Critics Circle of Australia writes, "'Intruders' is essentially a Hollywood style gore, slasher, murder thriller that contains the plot of a 'Jason X' movie, while being filmed with plenty of cinematic flair and style."
