= Cha Joo-wan =

South Korean actor (born 1999)

- Born: Baek Sun-woo; May 6, 1999 (age 27); Seoul, South Korea
- Occupation: Actor
- Years active: 2021–present
- Agent: Blitzway Entertainment
- Height: 186 cm (6 ft 1 in)

Korean name
- Hangul: 백선우
- Hanja: 白珗宇
- RR: Baek Seonu
- MR: Paek Sŏnu

Stage name
- Hangul: 차주완
- Hanja: 車柱完
- RR: Cha Juwan
- MR: Ch'a Chuwan
- Website: blitzway-ent.com

Baek Sun-woo (Korean: 백선우; born May 6, 1999), better known by his stage name Cha Joo-wan (차주완), is a South Korean actor. He made his debut in the KBS drama School 2021 in 2021.

== Early life and education ==
Cha used to be a soccer player. He was a goalkeeper for 12 years and played until college.

== Career ==
In May 2025, Cha signed an exclusive contract with Blitzway Entertainment.

== Filmography ==
=== Film ===
Year	Title	Role	Notes	Ref.
2024	Victory	Cheon Jin-tak		

=== Television series ===
Year	Title	Role	Notes	Ref.
2021	School 2021	Choi Tae-gang		
2026	The Remarried Empress	The royal messenger		

=== Web series ===
Year	Title	Role	Notes	Ref.
2024	Love for Loves Sake	Cha Yeo-woon		
2026	Sisters at War	Chae Chan-hyeon		

=== Television shows ===
Year	Title	Role	Notes	Ref.
2024–2025	The Gentlemen's League 3	Cast member	(Episode 52–66)	
2025–2026	The Gentlemen's League 4	Cast member		
2026	Bite Me Sweet	Cast member		

=== Music video appearances ===
Year	Song title	Artist	Ref.
2023	"Thirsty"	Aespa	
