= Lee Sung-wook =

South Korean actor (born 1979)

- Born: October 3, 1979 (age 47); Yangcheon District, Seoul, South Korea
- Occupation: Actor

Korean name
- Hangul: 이성욱
- RR: I Seonguk
- MR: I Sŏnguk

Lee Sung-wook (Korean: 이성욱, born October 3, 1979) is a South Korean actor. He is known for his roles in dramas such as Duel (2017), Misty (2018), 365: Repeat the Year (2020), and Forecasting Love and Weather (2022).

== Filmography ==
=== Films ===
Year	Title	Role	Ref.
2020	Collectors	Kwang-chul	
2020	Josée	Choi-kyung	
2021	Spiritwalker	Yoo Dae-ri	

=== Television series ===
Key
†	Denotes television productions that have not yet been released

Year	Title	Role	Note	Ref.
2016	A Beautiful Mind	Yoo Jang-bae		
2017	Good Manager	Sang-hyuk	Cameo	
2017	Duel	Go Bon-seok		
2018	Misty	Oh Dae-woong		
2018	Where Stars Land	Choi Moo-ja		
2020	365: Repeat the Year	Park Sun-ho		
2021	The Silent Sea	Kim Sun		
2022	Forecasting Love and Weather	Eom Dong-han		
2022	Extraordinary Attorney Woo	Hwang Doo-yong	Cameo (Episode 5)	
2023	XO, Kitty	Mr. Kim		
2023	Miraculous Brothers	Lee Tae-man	Guest role	
2023	The Deal	Voyager		
2026	Doctor X: Mafia in White	Bae Heung-gon		

== Awards and nominations ==
Name of the award ceremony, year presented, category, nominee of the award, and the result of the nomination
Award ceremony	Year	Category	Nominated work	Result	Ref.
MBC Drama Awards	2020	Best Supporting Actor	365: Repeat the Year	Won	
