= Lee Chan-hyeong =

South Korean actor (born 1997)

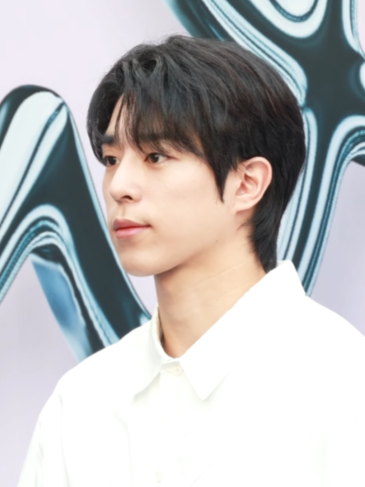
- Lee in 2024
- Born: November 3, 1997 (age 28); South Korea
- Occupation: Actor
- Years active: 2019–present
- Agent: Just Entertainment
- Website: justent.co.kr

Lee Chan-hyeong (Korean: 이찬형; born November 3, 1997) is a South Korean actor. He debuted through the web drama Re-Feel (2019).

== Biography ==
Lee Chan-hyeong was born November 3, 1997, in South Korea.

He is a former soccer player who started playing in fifth grade and continued until 20 years old. He played for the Bucheon FC 1995 youth team through high school before quitting soccer to pursue an acting career.

== Career ==
In December 2023, Lee departed Mystic Story and signed an exclusive contract with Just Entertainment.

== Filmography ==
=== Film ===
Year	Title	Role	Notes	Ref.
2021	My Sweet Dear	Yoon Do-geon		
2023	Brave Citizen	Lee Kwon-jung		
2023	Usury Academy	Kim Gi-yeong		
2024	Victory	Kim Dong-hyun		
2025	The Ghost Game	Choi Dong-jun		

=== Television series ===
Year	Title	Role	Notes	Ref.
2019	Hospital Playlist	Choi Sung-young		
2019	The Uncanny Counter	Kwon Su-ho		
2021	Hospital Playlist 2	Choi Sung-young		
2022	KBS Drama Special – Like Otters	Choi Tae-jeong	One-act drama	
2023	The Uncanny Counter 2	Kwon Su-ho		
2026	Honour	Kang Eun-seok		
TBA	Sleeping Doctor	Yang Jae-jin		

=== Web series ===
Year	Title	Role	Notes	Ref.
2019	Re-Feel	Han Jae-hee		
2019	Fight Hard, Love Harder 2	Ji Woo-ri		
2021	My Sweet Dear	Yoon Do-geon		
2021	Adult Trainee	Song Hee-jun		
2023	Doona!	Ji Se-hun		
2025	One: High School Heroes	Heo Seong-wook		

=== Television shows ===
Year	Title	Role	Notes	Ref.
2022	All Table Tennis!			
2025	The Gentlemen's League 4	Cast member		

=== Music video appearances ===
Year	Song title	Artist	Ref.
2019	"On the Road" (길에서)	Soyou feat. Jukjae	
2020	"Can't Hold You" (붙잡을 수가 없잖아)	O.WHEN	
2021	"What to say" (말도 못해)	Kim Han-kyul	
2022	"Drunken Night" (술이 뭐길래)	Zia X Huh Gak	
