= Hide (TV series) =

2024 South Korean television series

- Promotional poster
- Hangul: 하이드
- RR: Haideu
- MR: Haidŭ
- Genre: Mystery; Suspense
- Created by: Yoo Bo-ra
- Based on: Keeping Faith by Matthew Hall
- Developed by: Kim Sung-han
- Written by: Lee Hee-soo; Choi Ah-yul; Hwang Yu-jeong
- Directed by: Kim Dong-hwi
- Starring: Lee Bo-young; Lee Moo-saeng; Lee Chung-ah; Lee Min-jae
- Music by: Hwang Sang-joon
- Country of origin: South Korea
- Original language: Korean
- No. of episodes: 12

Production
- Executive producers: Ahn Hye-yeon (CP); Seo Young-hee (CP); Kim Ho-jun (CP); Kim Ji-won
- Producers: Woo Se-jin; Shin Ji-min; Kim Dong-gu; Oh Kwang-hee; Kim Geon-hong; Lee Min-jin; Yoon Na-hyeon
- Cinematography: Jang Jong-kyung; Kim Do-hee
- Editors: Kim Woo-il; Lee Bo-nae; Bae Hwan
- Running time: 60 minutes
- Production companies: SLL; CJ ENM Studios; DK E&M

Original release
- Network: Coupang Play; JTBC
- Release: March 23 – April 28, 2024

Related
- Keeping Faith

Hide (Korean: 하이드) is a 2024 South Korean television series based on the Welsh TV series Keeping Faith, and starring Lee Bo-young, Lee Moo-saeng, Lee Chung-ah, and Lee Min-jae. It is an original drama of Coupang Play, and is available for streaming on its platform at 22:00 (KST). It also aired on JTBC on March 23, to April 28, 2024, every Saturday and Sunday at 22:30 (KST).

== Synopsis ==
When her husband disappears without a trace, Na Moon-yeong begins a search to find him and uncover the secrets of his disappearance.

== Cast and characters ==
=== Main ===
- Lee Bo-young as Na Moon-yeong
  - Lee Ga-eun as young Na Moon-yeong

A former prosecutor who runs a law firm with her husband.

- Lee Moo-saeng as Cha Seong-jae

Moon-young's husband.

- Lee Chung-ah as Ha Yeon-joo

Moon-young's friendly neighbor.

- Lee Min-jae as Do Jin-woo

A mysterious man.

=== Supporting ===
- Jo Eun-sol as Cha Bom

Moon-yeong and Seong-jae's daughter.

- Park Ji-il as Cha Woong

The Chairman of Cha Woong Foundation and father of Seong-jae.

- Nam Gi-ae as Park Myeong-hee

Mother of Seong-jae.

- Kim Sang-ho as Baek Min-yeop

A police officer who has a bad relationship with Moon-yeong.

- Kim Gook-hee as Joo Sin-hwa

A prosecutor at a local prosecutor's office and Moon-yeong's friend.

- Oh Kwang-rok as Na Seok-jin

Father of Moon-yeong.

- Hong Seo-jun as Ma Gang

The manager of Geumshin Corporation who is a gangster.

- Lee Seon-hee as Go Chun-hee

An office manager at Cha Woong law firm and strong supporter of Moon-yeong.

- Lim Too-chul as Jo In-gyu

The youngest employee at Cha Woong law firm.

- Kim Min as Seok-gu

A driver at a real estate development company who is shrouded in mystery.

- Ju Seok-tae as Choi Ho-sik

CEO of Geumshin Corporation.

- Kwon Sung-min as Yoo Jeong-ho

A prosecutor with tough personality.

== Release ==
The series was scheduled to premiere on March 23, 2024, and would air every Saturday and Sunday. It would be released on Coupang Play at 22:00 (KST), and then would broadcast on JTBC at 22:30 (KST).

== Viewership ==
Hide : South Korea viewers per episode (thousands)

Season	Episode number												Average
Season	1	2	3	4	5	6	7	8	9	10	11	12	Average
1	976	1053	1041	1289	949	1120	993	964	954	1083	938	863	1019

Source: Audience measurement performed nationwide by Nielsen Korea.

Average TV viewership ratings
Ep.	Original broadcast date	Average audience share (Nielsen Korea)	
Ep.	Original broadcast date	Nationwide	Seoul
1	March 23, 2024	4.050% (1st)	4.433% (1st)
2	March 24, 2024	4.323% (1st)	4.721% (1st)
3	March 30, 2024	4.334% (1st)	5.040% (1st)
4	March 31, 2024	5.977% (1st)	6.607% (1st)
5	April 6, 2024	4.467% (1st)	5.312% (1st)
6	April 7, 2024	4.959% (1st)	5.595% (1st)
7	April 13, 2024	4.273% (1st)	4.831% (1st)
8	April 14, 2024	4.708% (1st)	5.191% (1st)
9	April 20, 2024	4.132% (1st)	4.531% (1st)
10	April 21, 2024	4.552% (1st)	4.778% (1st)
11	April 27, 2024	4.431% (1st)	4.661% (1st)
12	April 28, 2024	4.018% (1st)	4.637% (1st)
Average		4.519%	5.028%
In the table above, the blue numbers represent the lowest ratings and the red numbers represent the highest ratings.; This drama aired on a cable channel/pay TV which normally has a relatively smaller audience compared to free-to-air TV/public broadcasters (KBS, SBS, MBC, and EBS).
