= Go Geon-han =

South Korean actor

- Born: Kim Min-kyu; 20 December 1988 (age 37); Daegu, South Korea
- Other names: Kim Min-gyoo, Ko Gun-han
- Education: Kyungsung University (Department of Theater and Film)
- Occupation: Actor
- Years active: 2011–present
- Agent: YY Entertainment
- Known for: Clean with Passion for Now; The Tale of Nokdu; Sweet Home

Kim Min-kyu (Korean: 김민규; born December 20, 1988) known professionally as Go Geon-han (고건한) is a South Korean actor. He is known for his roles in dramas such as Clean with Passion for Now, The Tale of Nokdu and Sweet Home. He also appeared in movies Friend: The Great Legacy and The Battle of Jangsari.

== Career ==
In July 2025, after departing from Neos Entertainment, Go joined YY Entertainment.

== Filmography ==
=== Film ===
Year	Title	Role	Ref.
2011	Fighting Spirit	Hyun-soo	
2013	Friend: The Great Legacy	Kim Min	
2014	The Youth	Student	
2015	Shadow Island	Policeman	
2018	Duck Town	Byeong-soo	
2018	Soldier's Mementos	Corporal Go	
2019	My Bossy Girl	Young-chul	
2019	The Battle of Jangsari	Choi Jae-pil	
2020	Best Friend	University student	
2021	Waiting for Rain	Jong-gook	
2023	Long Distance	James Han	
2023	The Roundup: No Way Out	Speed	
2025	Pretty Crazy	Hee-beom	
2026	Underground		

=== Television ===
Year	Title	Role	Notes	Ref.
2014	Quiz of God	Kang Soo-ha's son	Season 4	
2015	Oh My Venus	Mr. Byeong		
2016	Gogh, The Starry Night	Seo-won		
2017	If We Were a Season	Lee Jung-ho		
2017	Fight for My Way	Moo-bin's colleague		
2017	I'm Not a Robot	Ssanip		
2018	Partners for Justice	Kim Joon-tae		
2018	Tale of Fairy	Park Shin-seon		
2018	Clean with Passion for Now	Jeon Young-shik		
2019	Birthday Letter	Jo Ham-duk		
2019	Special Labor Inspector	Kim Sun-woo		
2019	The Tale of Nokdu	Yeon-geum		
2020	Kkondae Intern	Oh Dong-geun		
2020	Sweet Home	Choi Yoon-jae	Season 1	
2021	Save Me Oldie	Yoo Gi-hyeon		
2021	Revolutionary Sisters	Byun Sa-chae		
2021	You Are My Spring	Eun-ha's ex-boyfriend		
2022	Through the Darkness	Yang Yong-cheol		
2022	Military Prosecutor Doberman	Yoon Sang-gi		
2022	Bloody Heart	Kim Do-ryung		
2022	Poong, the Joseon Psychiatrist	Lee Ho-jun		
2022	The Law Cafe	Attorney Meng		
2022	Narco-Saints	Dong-woo		
2022	Love in Contract	Lee Seon-ho		
2022	The Empire	Event Moderator		
2022	Behind Every Star	Alex		
2023	Taxi Driver	Victor	Season 2	
2023	Tale of the Nine Tailed 1938	Jang San-beom		
2023	My Lovely Liar	CEO's son		
2023	The Killing Vote	Jordan		
2024	Love for Loves Sake	Myung-ha's senior		
2024	Good Partner	Kim Ho-seok	Season 1	
2024	Nothing Uncovered	Cha Geum-sae		
2025	Love Scout	Lee Kwang-hee		
2025	The Scandal of Chunhwa	Prince Hwaing		
2026	Happy Anding	Hwang Chan-seong		
