= Delivery (web series) =

2021 South Korean web series

- Promotional poster
- Also known as: Space Delivery
- Hangul: 딜리버리
- Lit.: Delivery Express
- RR: Dillibeori
- MR: Tillibŏri
- Genre: Action comedy
- Directed by: Bang Jin-hyun
- Starring: Cho Mi-yeon; Lee Tae-vin
- Country of origin: South Korea
- Original language: Korean

Production
- Running time: 80 minutes
- Production company: Gyeonggi-do Co., Ltd.

Original release
- Network: YouTube; IPTV
- Release: November 12, 2021

Delivery (Korean: 딜리버리), also called Delivery Express, is a South Korean action comedy web series starring Cho Mi-yeon and Lee Tae-vin. The series is produced by Gyeonggi-do Co., Ltd, to promote the delivery application 'Delivery Express' service in the Gyeonggi Province, and is aiming for the effect of helping to revitalize the local economy by exposing the products of small and medium-sized enterprises in the province. It is available for streaming through YouTube and IPTV on November 12, 2021.

== Synopsis ==
Delivery tells the story of Kwak Doo-sik (Cho Mi-yeon), a 20-year-old delivery girl who is well versed in martial arts, and Do Ki-hwan (Lee Tae-vin), the manager of a delivery agency, encounters with a band of aliens attempting to invade earth while searching for Kwak Doo-sik's mother.

== Cast ==
=== Main ===
- Cho Mi-yeon as Kwak Doo-sik
- Lee Tae-vin as Do Ki-hwan

=== Supporting ===
- Kim Eung-soo as Kim Teug-chul, Kwak Doo-sik's martial arts teacher.
- Choi Hwan-hee (Z.Flat).
- Kim Jae-woon

== Production ==
=== Development ===
On August 28, 2021, Gyeonggi-do Co., Ltd announced their third web series, Delivery, as part of their new concept of a shared market economy between local organizations and small and medium-sized enterprises through an integrated marketing platform such as an on/offline sales system and marketing support. The company previously produced Dangerous Invitation (2020) and 8 Reasons I Don't Want to Marry You (2021), which had a significant effect in promoting product placement (PPL) for small and medium-sized businesses in the province.

The CEO of Gyeonggi-do Co., Ltd., Lee Seok-Hoon, said, "In a difficult time due to COVID-19, we decided to produce a web drama with a solid scenario and large casting to promote excellent products of small and medium-sized businesses in the province. It will be an excellent opportunity to promote naturally." Jeon Young-won, CEO of Azero Co., Ltd., participating in this web drama PPL, said, "Small and medium-sized enterprises have a lot of difficulties in public relations due to problems such as funds, and it is challenging to keep up with trends. We are looking forward to the effect of one stone and two birds."

=== Casting ===
In August 2021, Gyeonggi-do Co., Ltd announced Delivery starring Cho Mi-yeon and Lee Tae-vin as the leads. It is said that the casting of "Miyeon, the main vocalist of girl group (G)I-dle [who] has [the] strong overseas and domestic fandom willingly decided to appear in this web drama to help local small and medium-sized enterprises during difficult times due to COVID-19 in the province." The leads are said to have already started intensive action training for high workability. Choi Hwan-hee and Kim Eung-soo officially joined the cast on August 31 and September 2, respectively.

=== Filming ===
Principal photography began in September 2021 and ended on October 6. The first script-reading was held on September 3, 2021, at Nuri Dream Square in Sangam-dong, Mapo District, Seoul, South Korea with the attendance of the cast and crew.

== Release ==
On October 26, 2021, the series opened a YouTube channel along with a teaser video.
