= Rich Man (TV series) =

2018 South Korean TV series

- Promotional poster
- Also known as: Rich Man, Poor Woman
- Hangul: 리치맨
- RR: Richimaen
- MR: Rich'imaen
- Genre: Romance comedy
- Created by: Fuji Television (original)
- Based on: Rich Man, Poor Woman by Naoko Adachi, Masami Nishiura and Ryo Tanaka
- Developed by: Kim Jae-hoon; Kwon Eui-jung
- Written by: Hwang Jo-yoon; Park Jung-ye
- Directed by: Min Doo-sik
- Starring: Kim Jun-myeon; Ha Yeon-soo; Oh Chang-seok; Kim Ye-won
- Country of origin: South Korea
- Original language: Korean
- No. of episodes: 16 (+ 1 special)

Production
- Executive producers: Hwang Hyuk; Jeon Yong-joo; Lee Gun-young
- Producer: Kim Bong-joo
- Camera setup: Single-camera
- Running time: 60 mins
- Production company: iHQ

Original release
- Network: MBN; Dramax
- Release: May 9 – June 28, 2018

Rich Man (Korean: 리치맨) is a 2018 television series starring Kim Jun-myeon, Ha Yeon-soo, Oh Chang-seok and Kim Ye-won. It is a remake of the 2012 Japanese television series Rich Man, Poor Woman. The drama is aired on MBN and Dramax starting May 9, 2018 on Wednesdays and Thursdays at 23:00 (KST).

== Synopsis ==
This is a romance story about Lee Yoo-chan (Kim Jun-myeon), a genius programmer and CEO of IT company Next In who can't recognize the face of his first love, Kim Boon-hong, because of his facial recognition disability and Kim Bo-ra (Ha Yeon-soo), a college student who has an AlphaGo-like memory and is an aspiring job-seeker. At a recruitment meeting for dozens of people aspiring to work at Next In, Yoo-chan humiliates many of the attendees and in particular picks on Bo-ra, even after she spectacularly demonstrates her remarkable memory. But instead of slinking away like many of the applicants, she stands up to him. Just before he makes her leave, after sarcastically nicknaming her the "Queen of Rote Memory", she tells him that her name is Kim Boon-hong. This troubles Yoo-chan. A couple of days later, Next In executives decide they need to employ someone with a photographic memory. They search for Kim Boon-hong's resume but although they cannot find it at first, Min Tae-joo (Oh Chang-suk), Yoo-chan's friend and company co-founder, recognizes Bo-ra's photograph. This leads to a short-term offer of a job to Bo-ra.

== Cast ==
=== Main ===
- Kim Jun-myeon as Lee Yoo-chan

A genius programmer who is also the CEO of gaming company, "Next In". He has a facial recognition disability, and thus cannot recognize the woman he loves.

- Ha Yeon-soo as Kim Bo-ra

A jobless college graduate who dreams of working at "Next In." She has a positive attitude and an excellent memory.

- Oh Chang-seok as Min Tae-joo

Vice president of "Next In". He is gentle and warm.

- Kim Ye-won as Min Tae-ra

Younger sister of Tae-joo. A gallery curator.

=== Supporting ===
==== Next In staff ====
- Jung Yo-han as Steve Jo, an employee at "Next In." He's known for his lighthearted, joking attitude and his random comments in perfect English.
- Choi Kwang-il as Nam Chul-woo (Administration Director)
- Park Sung-hoon as Cha Do-jin (Programmer). Seemingly narcissistic but opens up gradually. Ends up married.
- Lee Jae-jin as Kang Chan-soo (Management Team employee)
- Kim Ian as Jang Do-il (New Development Team leader)
- Gong Seo-young as Oh Se-yeon (Yoo-Chan's secretary)

==== People around Yoo-Chan ====
- Kim Min-ji as Kim Boon-hong

Yoo-chan's first love and Bo-ra's life mentor

- Park Hyun-woo as Michael

Friend who grew up with Yoo-chan in an orphanage.

==== People around Bo-ra ====
- Yun Da-yeong as Park Mi-so (Bo-ra's college friend and roommate)
- Kim Jung-pal as Kim Il-goo (Bo-ra's father)
- Hwang Young-hee as Jo Yeon-shil (Bo-ra's mother)
- Sung Byung-suk as Park Kkot-bun (Bo-ra's grandmother)
- Park Won-suk as Kim Bo-sung (Bo-ra's brother)

=== Others ===
- Choi Ji-na as Jung Young-suk (Vice Minister of Science and Technology)
- Lee Tae-vin as Lee Jae-young

== Production ==
- First script reading took place on March 23.
- Filming began on March 26.

== Original soundtrack ==
Rich Man OST

Soundtrack album by Various Artists
- Released: 2018
- Genre: Soundtrack
- Languages: Korean; English
- Labels: Music Zip distributed by Kakao M

=== Part 1 ===
Released on May 12, 2018
No.	Title	Lyrics	Music	Artist	Length
1.	"Hard for Me"	Jeon Chang-yeob; Yoon Jin-hyo	Yoon Jin-hyo; Jeon Chang-yeob	Cheeze	3:26
2.	"Hard for Me" (Inst.)		Yoon Jin-hyo; Jeon Chang-yeob		3:26
Total length:					6:52

=== Part 2 ===
Released on May 19, 2018
No.	Title	Lyrics	Music	Artist	Length
1.	"Real Love"	ASUKA	Jeon Chang-yeob; Yoon Jin-hyo	Nam Tae-hyun (South Club)	3:55
2.	"Real Love" (Inst.)		Jeon Chang-yeob; Yoon Jin-hyo		3:55
Total length:					7:50

=== Part 3 ===
Released on May 26, 2018
No.	Title	Lyrics	Music	Artist	Length
1.	"Let's Pray"	Jeon Chang-yeob; Yoon Jin-hyo	Jeon Chang-yeob; Yoon Jin-hyo	Kei (Lovelyz)	3:55
2.	"Let's Pray" (Inst.)		Jeon Chang-yeob; Yoon Jin-hyo		3:55
Total length:					7:50

=== Part 4 ===
Released on June 2, 2018
No.	Title	Lyrics	Music	Artist	Length
1.	"Single Heart (일편단심)"	Jeon Chang-yeob	Jeon Chang-yeob; Choi Byung-chang	Bella, Hyeseong (Elris)	3:18
2.	"Single Heart (일편단심)" (Inst.)		Jeon Chang-yeob; Choi Byung-chang		3:18
Total length:					6:36

=== Part 5 ===
Released on June 9, 2018
No.	Title	Lyrics	Music	Artist	Length
1.	"Hard for Me"	Jeon Chang-yeob; Yoon Jin-hyo	Yoon Jin-hyo; Jeon Chang-yeob	Doyoung (NCT)	3:26
2.	"Hard for Me" (Inst.)		Yoon Jin-hyo; Jeon Chang-yeob		3:26
Total length:					6:52

=== Part 6 ===
Released on June 16, 2018
No.	Title	Lyrics	Music	Artists	Length
1.	"Do U"	Kevin; Riwon	Kevin	Monogram	3:36
2.	"Do U" (Inst.)		Kevin		3:36
Total length:					7:12

=== Part 7 ===
Released on June 23, 2018
No.	Title	Lyrics	Music	Artist	Length
1.	"My Spring" (나의 봄)	Mama Gorilla; Yoon Hee-won	Park Suk-won; Joo Ji-hoon; Kim Sung-jong; Yoon Hee-won	Song Ha-ye	4:37
2.	"My Spring" (Inst.)		Park Suk-won; Joo Ji-hoon; Kim Sung-jong; Yoon Hee-won		4:37
Total length:					9:14

=== Part 8 ===
Released on June 30, 2018
No.	Title	Lyrics	Music	Artist	Length
1.	"I'm Also Like You" (나도 너처럼)	Lee Joo-hee	Lee Joo-hee	Lee Byung-chul	4:45
2.	"I'm Also Like You" (Inst.)		Lee Joo-hee		4:45
Total length:					9:30

== Ratings ==
- In the table below, the blue numbers represent the lowest ratings and the red numbers represent the highest ratings.
- TNmS stopped their ratings since June, 2018.

Ep.	Broadcast date	Average audience share		
Ep.	Broadcast date	AGB Nielsen		TNmS
Ep.	Broadcast date	MBN	Dramax	MBN
Ep.	Broadcast date	Nationwide		
1	May 9, 2018	1.5%	0.2%	1.6%
2	May 10, 2018	1.0%	0.2%	1.0%
3	May 16, 2018	1.2%	0.1%	1.1%
4	May 17, 2018	1.1%	0.3%	1.2%
5	May 23, 2018	1.4%	0.2%	1.1%
6	May 24, 2018	1.0%	0.2%	0.8%
7	May 30, 2018	1.4%	0.1%	1.3%
8	May 31, 2018	0.9%	0.2%	0.7%
9	June 6, 2018	1.9%	0.2%	—N/a
10	June 7, 2018	1.4%	0.3%	—N/a
11	June 13, 2018	1.2%	0.2%	—N/a
12	June 14, 2018	1.0%	-	—N/a
13	June 20, 2018	1.5%	0.4%	—N/a
14	June 21, 2018	1.1%	0.1%	—N/a
15	June 27, 2018	0.9%	0.2%	—N/a
16	June 28, 2018	0.8%	0.3%	—N/a
Average		1.21%	-	-
Special	May 2, 2018	—N/a		

- This drama airs on a cable channel/pay TV which normally has a relatively smaller audience compared to free-to-air TV/public broadcasters (KBS, SBS, MBC & EBS).
