= Shin Jun-seop =

South Korean actor and singer (born 1998)

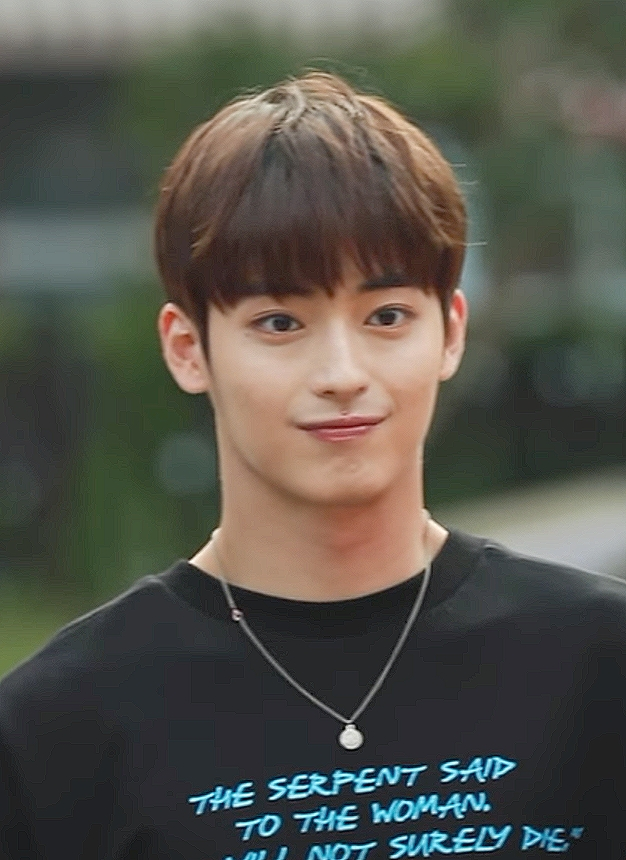
- Shin in 2018
- Born: South Korea
- Occupations: Actor; singer; rapper
- Years active: 2017–present
- Agent: 51K

Korean name
- Hangul: 신준섭
- RR: Sin Junseop
- MR: Sin Chunsŏp

Shin Jun-seop (Korean: 신준섭; born 1998) is a South Korean actor, singer, and rapper. He was a member of the boy group Myteen debuted in 2017. He made his acting debut in 2018, and is best known for his roles in the web series One Fine Week (2019–2020) and television series One: High School Heroes (2025).

== Career ==
=== 2017–present: Debut with Myteen and acting debut ===
Shin was included as part of the seven members of the boy group Myteen in August 2016. In June 2017, he appeared briefly as a contestant in Mnet's Show Me the Money 6. Before debuting with Myteen, Shin, who is a rapper, released his first mixtape 'SHIN JUN SEOP MIXTAPE #1' through his SoundCloud on July 10, 2017, featuring a total of 4 tracks. He then debuted with the group on July 26, 2017. In November 2017, he joined the JTBC reality competition show Mix Nine.

Shin made his acting debut in JTBC television series Gangnam Beauty (2018) as the younger version of Do Gyeong-seok. He then made his first leading role in the web series Login to You. In 2019, Shin was cast in two web series, Re-Feel and One Fine Week. In 2020, Shin signed an exclusive contract with 51K and was confirmed to star in season 2 of One Fine Week. In 2025, Shin appeared in Wavve series One: High School Heroes as Nam Seung-sik.

== Personal life ==
=== Military service ===
On December 14, 2020, Shin enlisted in the 9th Division's White Horse Unit.

== Discography ==
| Title | Year | Peak chart positions | Album |
| Title | Year | KOR | Album |
|---|---|---|---|
| "별들은 눈부시고 그대는 따사롭다 (Dazzling Stars & Your Warmth)" | 2019 | 119 | One Fine Week OST Part 2 |
| "I Promise" | 2021 | 122 | One Fine Week 2 OST Part 1 |

== Filmography ==
=== Television series ===
| Year | Title | Role | Notes | Ref. |
|---|---|---|---|---|
| 2018 | Gangnam Beauty | Do Gyeong-seok (young) | Acting debut | |
| 2020 | Single & Ready to Mingle | | Special appearance | |
| 2025 | One: High School Heroes | Nam Seung-sik | | |

=== Web series ===
| Year | Title | Role | Notes | Ref. |
|---|---|---|---|---|
| 2018 | Login to You | Bae Seo-jun | | |
| 2019 | Re-Feel | Go Tae-geon | | |
| 2019–2020 | One Fine Week | Han Jung-woo | Season 1–2 | |

=== Television shows ===
| Year | Title | Role | Ref. |
|---|---|---|---|
| 2017 | Show Me the Money 6 | Contestant | |
| 2017 | Mix Nine | Contestant | |
