= Love for Love's Sake =

2025 South Korean fantasy romance television miniseries

- Promotional poster
- Hangul: 연애 지상주의 구역
- RR: Yeonae jisangjuui guyeok
- MR: Yŏnae chisangjuŭi kuyŏk
- Genre: Romantic drama; Fantasy television; Youth; Boys' Love
- Written by: Kwon Cho-rong
- Directed by: Kim Kyun-ah
- Starring: Lee Tae-vin; Cha Joo-wan; Oh Min-su; Cha Woong-ki
- Country of origin: South Korea
- Original language: Korean
- No. of seasons: 1
- No. of episodes: 8

Production
- Production locations: Seoul, South Korea
- Running time: 30 minutes

Original release
- Network: Netflix; iQIYI; TVING; Wavve
- Release: 24 January – 1 February 2024

Love for Love’s Sake (Korean: 연애 지상주의 구역) is a 2024 South Korean fantasy romance miniseries directed by Kim Kyun-ah and written by Kwon Cho-rong. The series stars Lee Tae-vin, Cha Joo-wan, Oh Min-su, and Cha Woong-ki. It premiered on January 24, 2024, and was distributed through Netflix, iQIYI, TVING, and Wavve.

== Synopsis ==
Tae Myung-ha, a 29-year-old man, is unexpectedly transported into a fictional online game where he inhabits the body of a 19-year-old character. Within this virtual world, he is tasked with bringing happiness to Cha Yeo-woon, a talented athlete admired for his looks and achievements despite his modest background. As Myung-ha navigates this mission, he becomes entangled in a complex emotional dynamic involving Yeo-woon, the wealthy and passionate Cheon Sang-won, and the introverted Ahn Kyung-hoon, who offers quiet support throughout the journey.

== Cast ==
=== Main ===
- Lee Tae-vin as Tae Myung-ha
- Cha Joo-wan as Cha Yeo-woon
- Oh Min-su as Cheon Sang-won
- Cha Woong-ki as Ahn Kyung-hoon

=== Supporting ===
- Joo Boo-jin as Choi Sun-ja (Myun-ha's grandmother)
- Go Geon-han as Myung-ha's senior (episodes 1, 4, 6, 8)
- Joo Jong-bum as Tak Joon-ho (bully student)
- Park Sung-kyu as Tak Joonkyung (student)
- Moon Seo-woo as Ahn Si-ah (Kyung-hoon's sister)
- Go Yoo-yeon as Choi Jin-jo (sports brand marketing team leader)

== Production ==
The series blends fantasy, romance, and youth themes, with a narrative centered on emotional growth and virtual identity. It was filmed in Seoul and consists of eight episodes, each approximately 30 minutes long.

== Reception ==
Love for Love’s Sake received positive attention for its unique premise and emotional depth. It was praised for its portrayal of queer relationships and virtual storytelling. The series was listed among the most anticipated K-Dramas of July 2025 and gained traction across streaming platforms.

== Listicles ==
Year-end lists for Love for Love’s Sake
| Critic/Publication | List | Rank | Ref. |
|---|---|---|---|
| Teen Vogue | 13 Best BL Dramas of 2024 | Included | |
| Time Magazine | The 10 Best K-Dramas of 2024 | Included | |
