= Myteen =

2017–2019 South Korean boy band

MYTEEN
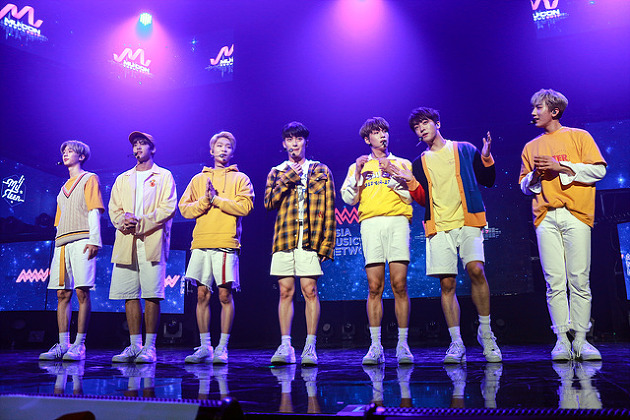
- MYTEEN at MUCON Showcase in September 2017; From left to right: Hanseul, Yuvin, Chunjin, Junseop, Kookheon, Taevin, and Eunsu.

Background information
- Origin: South Korea
- Genres: K-pop
- Years active: 2017–2019
- Label: Music Works
- Past members: Chunjin; Choi Eun-su; Kim Kook-heon; Shin Jun-seop; Song Yuvin; Hanseul; Lee Tae-vin
- Website: themusicworks.co.kr/myteen/

MYTEEN (Korean: 마이틴; short for Make Your Teenager) was a South Korean boy band formed by The Music Works in 2016 and debuted in 2017 with the release of their first extended play titled MYTEEN GO!. At the time of their disbandment, the group consisted of six members: Chunjin, Eunsu, Kim Kookheon, Shin Junseop, Song Yuvin, and Hanseul. Member Lee Tae-vin departed from the group on December 30, 2018. MYTEEN disbanded on August 21, 2019.

== History ==
=== Pre-debut ===
Song Yuvin competed in the singing competition show Superstar K6 in 2014, where he finished in TOP4. He later signed The Music Works and debuted as a soloist with releasing digital single "To The Bone It's You" featuring BtoB's Minhyuk on May 30, 2016. Later that month, The Music Works also announced that Song Yuvin would debut with an upcoming boy group in the first half of 2017 named MYTEEN. The group's name is a portmanteau of words "MY" and "TEENAGER" and reportedly meant that the group would be composed of idols who are vibrant and bright as teenagers. The Music Works later introduced seven members: Lee Taevin, Chunjin, Eunsu, Kim Kookheon, Shin Junseop, Hanseul with Song Yuvin on Baek Ji-young's nationwide concert Andante in Busan on August 27 with performed their upcoming track "Amazing" (어마어마하게).

To further promote their group, MYTEEN performed at selected middle and high schools in each region of South Korea as part of their Follow MYTEEN tour between October and November 2016. In January 2017, they held their first international fan meeting at Hong Kong and had their first reality show Trainee Escape Project - Myteen Go! (연습생 탈출 프로젝트 - 마이틴 GO!) aired on MBC Music.

=== 2017: Debut with MYTEEN GO! and MIXNINE ===
The group made their official debut on July 26 with the release of their first EP titled MYTEEN GO!. The EP contains seven tracks with the title track "Amazing". Their debut showcase was held at the Ilchi Art Hall on the same day as the album's release. They made their official debut stage on the music program M Countdown on the next day.

In October 2017, four members (Chunjin, Eunsu, Kookheon and Junseop) participated on the survival show MIXNINE, where only three members (Chunjin, Kookheon and Junseop) passed the auditions and made it into the Top 170. Chunjin and Junseop were eliminated in episodes 7 and 10 respectively while Kookheon made it into the finale but did not make the final cut.

=== 2018: F;UZZLE, Japanese debut and Taevin's departure ===
MYTEEN released their second EP F;UZZLE on July 10, 2018, with a total of seven tracks including the lead single "She Bad". They also held comeback showcase at the Ilchi Art Hall on the same day as the album's release.

MYTEEN debuted in Japan with their first Japanese single album SHE BAD (Japanese ver.) on October 24, 2018.

On December 30, 2018. The Music Works officially confirmed Taevin's departure from the group. He decided to focus on his acting career.

=== 2019: Produce X 101 Participation and disbandment ===
Kookheon and Yuvin have participated as the contestants in Produce X 101. On March 15, they were revealed as the candidates for the center of Produce X 101's title song "X1-MA". On Episode 11, Kookheon was eliminated on the show, losing to iMe Korea's Lee Se-jin for the 20th and final place and thus did not make the finals. Yuvin placed 17th on Episode 11, and advanced to the finals, but finished in 16th place and did not make the debut lineup. On August 21, it was announced via Eunsu's Instagram that MYTEEN would disband. The Music Works released a statement on their official site about the disbandment of the group after two years of activity.

== Members ==
=== Former ===
- Lee Tae-vin (이태빈)
- Chunjin (천진)
- Choi Eun-su (최은수)
- Kim Kook-heon (김국헌) (Note: Formerly known as Xiheon (시헌))
- Shin Jun-seop (신준섭)
- Song Yu-vin (송유빈)
- Hanseul (한슬)

== Discography ==
=== Extended plays ===
Title	Album details	Peak chart positions		Sales
Title	Album details	KOR	JPN	Sales
Myteen Go! (Note: Released as Myteen Japan 1st Mini Album Myteen Go! in Japan on July 31, 2017.)	Released: July 27, 2017; Label: The Music Works, Genie Music; Formats: CD, digital download; Track list: 1. Amazing (어마어마하게); 2. Hyper (붕 떠); 3. You-reka (이 동네 왜 이래); 4. Take It Out (꺼내가); 5. Mr. Misery; 6. 19.20; 7. Day by Day (짜장면)	17	77	KOR: 2,704; JP: 1,387
F;UZZLE	Released: July 10, 2018; Label: The Music Works, Genie Music; Formats: CD, digital download; Track list: 1. Martian; 2. Pretty in Pink; 3. Over You (지난 봄); 4. SHE BAD; 5. BBQ (At the Barbecue); 6. Beautiful Goodbye; 7. Pretty (예뻐)	15	—	KOR: 5,531

=== Singles ===
Title	Year	Album
"Amazing"	2017	Myteen Go!
"She Bad"	2018	F;UZZLE

== Filmography ==
=== Reality shows ===
Year	Title	Network	Note(s)
2016–2019	Myteen Show	Naver TV cast Naver V-Live	107 episodes
2017	Myteen Go!	MBC Music	7 episodes

== Awards and nominations ==
=== Korea Marketing Awards ===
Year	Nominee / work	Award	Result
2018	MYTEEN	내일의 스타 (Tomorrow's Star) Award	Won
