= Bloody Fight in Iron-Rock Valley =

- Directed by: Ji Ha Jean
- Starring: Lee Moo Saeng
- Release date: July 17, 2011 (PIFAN)
- Running time: 89 minutes
- Country: South Korea
- Language: Korean

Bloody Fight in Iron-Rock Valley(철암계곡의 혈투) is a 2011 South Korean film directed by Ji Ha Jean.

== Cast ==
- Lee Moo-saeng as Chul‑ki
- Ji Dae-han as Pan-ho
- Yeong-jin Jo
- Sang-hwa Yoon as Kwi-myeon
- Choi Ji-eun as Tae-yeon
- Yong Jik-lee as Kak-doo
- Oh Yong as Hak Bong
- Shim Wan-joon as Policeman

== Reception ==
The film won the award for Best Korean Independent Film at the 2011 Puchon International Fantastic Film Festival.
