= The Ghost Game =

2025 South Korean film

- Theatrical release poster
- Hangul: 강령: 귀신놀이
- RR: Gangnyeong: gwisinnori
- MR: Kangnyŏng: kwisinnori
- Directed by: Son Dong-wan
- Screenplay by: Son Dong-wan
- Produced by: Bae Soo-hong; Kim Young-hwan; Baek Ga-eun
- Starring: Kim Ye-rim; Lee Chan-hyeong; Seo Dong-hyun; Oh So-hyun; Kim Eun-bi; Park Seo-yeon
- Cinematography: Lee Jae-hwan
- Edited by: Kim Ji-won
- Production company: EO Contents Group
- Distributed by: Studio DHL (South Korea); KT Studio Genie (international)
- Release date: August 6, 2025
- Running time: 94 mins
- Country: South Korea
- Language: Korean

The Ghost Game (Korean: 강령: 귀신놀이; RR: Gangnyeong: gwisinnori) is a 2025 South Korean horror film directed and written by Son Dong-wan in his directorial debut. The film starring Kim Ye-rim, Lee Chan-hyeong, Seo Dong-hyun, Oh So-hyun, Kim Eun-bi, and Park Seo-yeon.

The film premiered at 29th Bucheon International Fantastic Film Festival on July 5, 2025.

It was released in theaters on August 6, 2025 by Studio DHL.

== Synopsis ==
Ja-young is haunted by guilt over her missing older sister. While filming a video for a contest, she and her friends perform a forbidden summoning ritual said to answer any question, but the ritual soon spirals out of control which leads them into terrifying incidents.

== Cast ==
- Kim Ye-rim as Ja-young

The class president of Class 5, Grade 3 at Gyesang High School.

- Lee Chan-hyeong as Dong-jun

A student who dreams of dominating South Korea's baseball world and has eyes only for his classmate Ja-young.

- Seo Dong-hyun as Ki-ho

He is the leader of filming and ritual.

- Oh So-hyun as Ye-eun

She is the precarious and sensitive relationship between Ja-young and Dong-jun.

- Kim Eun-bi as Mi-yeon

A top student aiming to enter Seoul National University.

- Park Seo-yeon as Seo-woo

Ja-young's younger sister.

== Production ==
The film was produced by EO Contents Group, a production company which produced the thriller series Night Has Come.

Principal photography began on September 9, 2024. On the same day, Kim Ye-rim, Lee Chan-hyeong, Seo Dong-hyun, Oh So-hyun, Kim Eun-bi, and Park Seo-yeon were confirmed to appear in this film. It was previously titled Next.

== Release ==
The film was officially invited to the Korean Fantastic in Feature Film section of the 29th Bucheon International Fantastic Film Festival and premiered on July 5, 2025.

It was also officially invited to the Brigadoon Section of the 58th Sitges Film Festival and 31rd Lund International Fantastic Film Festival.

== Box office ==
A preview screening was held on July 25, 2025. The film was exclusively released on CGV theaters on August 6, 2025.
