= The Silent Sea (TV series) =

2021 South Korean television series

- Promotional poster
- Hangul: 고요의 바다
- RR: Goyoui bada
- MR: Koyoŭi pada
- Genre: Science fiction; Thriller; Mystery
- Based on: The Sea of Tranquility by Choi Hang-yong
- Developed by: Netflix
- Written by: Park Eun-kyo
- Directed by: Choi Hang-yong
- Starring: Bae Doona; Gong Yoo; Lee Joon; Kim Sun-young; Lee Moo-saeng
- Country of origin: South Korea
- Original language: Korean
- No. of episodes: 8

Production
- Executive producer: Jung Woo-sung
- Running time: 39–51 minutes
- Production company: Artist Studio

Original release
- Network: Netflix
- Release: December 24, 2021

The Silent Sea (Korean: 고요의 바다) is a South Korean television series starring Bae Doona, Gong Yoo and Lee Joon. Director Choi Hang-yong created the series of eight episodes as an adaptation of his 2014 short film, The Sea of Tranquility, with the help of writer Park Eun-kyo. It was released on Netflix on December 24, 2021. The title The Silent Sea comes from the Sea of Tranquility on the Moon; the story follows a crewed mission to retrieve samples from a lunar research base. Mostly science fiction, it also blends genres like thriller and mystery. It received generally positive reviews from critics and audiences.

== Synopsis ==
On a near-future Earth suffering from extreme desertification, draconian measures have been put in place for potable water rationing. Scientist Song Ji‑An (Bae Doona) joins a hand-picked team of elite personnel on a mission to the Moon. They are headed to an abandoned research facility, Balhae Station, where her sister died five years prior, after 117 personnel were killed in an incident. The circumstances surrounding the incident are secret. Their mission is to retrieve a mysterious and sensitive sample. The captain of the team, Han Yun‑Jae (Gong Yoo), is a soldier for the space agency. Lieutenant Ryu Tae‑seok (Lee Joon) of the Ministry of National Defense volunteers to be part of the crew.

At the lunar facility, Song ascertains that the higher-ups have floated a bunch of half-truths and outright lies regarding the mission and the facility, and the nature of the accident that wiped out the staff. The sample turns out to consist of a new element that ostensibly looks like water, but multiplies like a virus when it comes in contact with living cells such as human blood. The team is attacked by a violent superhuman girl on the space station, one who is immune to the effects of lunar water. Meanwhile, they must contend with the fact that some members of their own party may have ulterior motives that lead to betrayal.

== Cast ==
=== Main ===
- Bae Doona as Doctor Song Ji-an

An astrobiologist determined to uncover the truth behind an accident at the now-abandoned Balhae Base research station on the Moon, where her deceased sister was a researcher.

- Gong Yoo as Han Yoon-jae

The exploration team leader who must carry out a crucial mission with limited information. He puts the completion of the mission and the safety of his team members above all else and does not refrain from putting himself in jeopardy to do so.

- Lee Joon as Lieutenant Ryu Tae-seok

The head engineer and former elite member of the Ministry of National Defense who volunteered for the mission in an attempt to escape the stifling environment at the Ministry, but is also harboring a deeper secret.

=== Supporting ===
Members of the mission

- Kim Sun-young as Dr. Hong Ga-young

The doctor of the team.

- Kim Si-a as Luna 073

A mysterious girl that is the sole survivor of the Balhae accident from 5 years prior.

- Lee Moo-saeng as Chief Gong Soo-hyuk

Head of the security team and elder brother of Soo-chan.

- Lee Sung-wook as Kim Sun

The main shuttle pilot of the team.

- Choi Yong-woo as Lee Gi-su

The shuttle co-pilot of the team who was switched with Eun Ji-young and joined the mission at the last minute.

- Jeong Soon-won as Gong Soo-chan

The assistant engineer of the team and brother of Chief Gong.

- Yoo Hee-je as E2

A soldier on the team.

- Cha Rae-hyoung as E1

A soldier on the team.

- Yoo Sung-joo as Mr. Hwang

A previous employee at Balhae station that left prior to, and thus was not present for, the incident 5 years ago, and now serves as the team's consultant.

- Yoon Hae-ri as Eun Ji-young

The original co-pilot of the mission, but was later switched with Lee Gi-su at the last minute.

Space and Aeronautics Administration (SAA)

- Kang Mal-geum as Song Won-kyung.

The chief researcher in Balhae station and the elder sister of Song Ji-an. Deceased prior to the start of the series.

- Heo Sung-tae as Kim Jae-sun.

Chief of Resource Group of Aviation Administration

- Gil Hae-yeon as Director Choi
- Ahn Dong-goo as Employee

== Episodes ==
No.	Title	Directed by	Written by	Original release date
1	"Balhae Lunar Research Station"	Choi Hang-yong	Park Eun-kyo	December 24, 2021
In the future, there is a critical worldwide water shortage. The Republic of Korea's Space and Aeronautics Division (SAA), led by Director Choi, sends a crew under Captain Han Yunjae to the Balhae Lunar Research Station on the Moon, where five years ago the station's crew of 117 died supposedly due to a radiation leak. SAA wants Han's crew to retrieve at least one of the capsules of a research sample from the station, though information on what the samples consist of exactly are supposedly lost and unknown to all, apart from needing to be kept at a regulated low temperature range. Among the crew is Dr. Song Jian, an astrobiologist whose sister died in the Balhae accident 5 years ago. The mission's spacecraft malfunctions en route and they crash on the Moon's surface, forcing the surviving crew to travel to the station by foot.
2	"Three Storages"	Choi Hang-yong	Park Eun-kyo	December 24, 2021
The crew enter the research station, where they find all its systems functional and a lack of the dangerous radiation that had allegedly wiped out the staff 5 years prior. They also find corpses that have physical signs similar to that of drowning victims. The crew split up into teams and search the station for viable samples, but find all the visible capsules empty or missing. Song's team detects a foreign presence moving around the station. Crewmember Soochan, in an effort to retrieve a hidden intact sample capsule, touches a corpse, which, upon contact, releases minuscule particle droplets that enter Soochan's eyes.
3	"Cause of Death"	Choi Hang-yong	Park Eun-kyo	December 24, 2021
Crewmember Gisu, searching a storage unit independently, finds a single viable capsule which appears to be filled with water, but he is attacked by an unknown entity that kills him and takes the capsule. Upon searching his corpse, the others discovered that he had been maintaining periodic contact with an outside organization, and was secretly acting as an agent in their best interests rather than aligning with the crew's mission. Han confirms that the intruder travels in the ventilation system and can access areas that are not in the station's blueprints. Song theorizes that the intruder is a human survivor of the original Balhae crew. Soochan quickly falls ill and expels unnatural amounts of water from his body until he dies from drowning symptoms, much like the corpses littering the station.
4	"The Truth Comes Out"	Choi Hang-yong	Park Eun-kyo	December 24, 2021
The crew manages to reestablish communication with Earth, and Director Choi orders them to retrieve the capsule taken by the intruder from Gisu before they can be rescued. Song and medical officer Hong analyze the water in Soochan's blood, and realize that it acts like a virus and multiplies (i.e., increases in volume) rapidly when in contact with living tissue. They confront Han, who admits that he was told by Director Choi that the samples they are collecting is lunar water, though he is unaware of its effects. Lunar water was originally discovered by Song's sister, Song Wonkyong, and the SAA has been hiding its existence for fear that other parties might figure out how to make it safe for human consumption first and monopolize the substance. Han and Song find a deep hollow basement full of plants.
5	"Secret Storage"	Choi Hang-yong	Park Eun-kyo	December 24, 2021
The crew, exploring the basement, find an abundant mass of plant life grown from lunar water, and come across a storage room that is not in the station's blueprints, and which contains hundreds of capsule samples in good condition. The crew obtain a few samples before being attacked by the intruder, who appears to be a human girl but is unnaturally fast and strong. One of the crew members is wounded by the girl and bleeds out. Choi insists they kill the child to prevent others from finding other capsules. Song searches for the station's research data, but it has been erased. Ryu is revealed to be a corporate spy who has been sabotaging the mission, ostensibly affiliated with the same organization as Gisu had been.
6	"Key to Salvation"	Choi Hang-yong	Park Eun-kyo	December 24, 2021
In a tense confrontation between the girl and the crew, a lunar water sample capsule is compromised and splashes over her, which, instead of resulting in a fatal reaction, heals her wounds and allows her to escape. Song theorizes that the girl has a condition or immunity that makes her compatible with lunar water, and that she may be the key to making lunar water safe for consumption back on Earth. The crew set a trap for the girl; the girl bites Song, who was acting as bait, but allows Song to follow her to her room, which Song realizes used to be her sister Wonkyong's room. Ryu takes the crew's remaining samples capsules, kills a crew member to cover his tracks, and seals all doors to trap the remaining crewmembers.
7	"Luna"	Choi Hang-yong	Park Eun-kyo	December 24, 2021
Song finds the station's missing research data in Wonkyong's room, which includes details of SAA's experiments of lunar water on genetically-modified clone children tagged with Luna numbers. The girl, Luna 073, was the only one who did not die, and she is the only survivor of the Balhae accident. Kim Sun accidentally exposes himself to lunar water from a damaged sample capsule while confronting Ryu and perishes. Ryu programs the station's air purification cycle to run, intending to flood the station with lunar water that had accumulated in the basement with the plants so that he may kill the others and escape, but his departure is delayed when Han catches him. Ryu manages to flee with the remaining samples in hand, but is exposed to lunar water that bursts from the ceiling. Song is also exposed to lunar water, and attempts to self isolate before she can infect Han, Gong, and Dr. Hong.
8	"The Silent Sea"	Choi Hang-yong	Park Eun-kyo	December 24, 2021
Song starts vomiting water, but because Luna bit her, her body has developed some resistance to its effects, and she is able to recover. The remaining crew agrees that, though lunar water is dangerous, it could be the salvation of humanity, but if they take Luna to Earth she will be treated as an experiment forever. Song suggests that they take her to the International Institute of Space Biology, a space station and neutral territory, to ensure both Luna's safety and that the benefits of further researching the lunar water will be shared with everyone. The station starts to collapse from the lunar water flooding; Ryu succumbs to his symptoms, and Han and Gong sacrifice themselves so that Song, Luna and Hong can make it out safely with the remaining samples. Once outside the station, it is shown that Luna can survive exposure to the Moon's vacuum (the Moon has such a rarefied atmosphere that in any practical case can be defined as vacuum) without a space suit. A rescue team successfully picks up the surviving crew and samples.

== Production ==
=== Development ===
In December 2019, Netflix announced that it would produce the television series The Silent Sea, adapted from the 2014 eponymous short film directed by Choi Hang-yong. He will also be directing the series, with Jung Woo-sung standing in as the executive producer.

=== Casting ===
In April 2020, Bae Doona and Gong Yoo were cast in lead roles. In September 2020, they were officially joined by Heo Sung-tae and Lee Moo-saeng.

== Reception ==
On the review aggregator website Rotten Tomatoes, 80% of 15 critics' reviews are positive, with an average rating of 6.60/10. The website's consensus reads: "The Silent Sea marks one small step for man, one overlong leap for television, but it delivers enough intrigue and menace to satisfy patient viewers."

== See also ==
- Lunar base
- Water on the Moon
- The Tranquillity Alternative
- Crewed mission to the Moon
