= IOK Media =

South Korean TV Series Production Company

- Company type: Small and medium-sized enterprises
- Genre: Korean drama
- Founded: February 17, 2012
- Headquarters: 5th floor, 19 Chungho building, 148 Street, Eonju-ro, Gangnam District, Seoul, South Korea
- Key people: Go Byung-chul (CEO)
- Products: TV series
- Services: TV series production; TV series distribution; TV series marketing
- Revenue: Less than 500 million won (December 2016)
- Number of employees: 1~20 (December 2013)
- Parent: IOK Company
- Korean: (주)아이오케이미디어; RR: (Ju)Aiokeimidieo
- Website: iokcompany.net/IOK-MEDIA/

IOK Media (Korean: 아이오케이미디어; RR: Aiokei midieo) is a South Korean TV series production company, distributor, and marketer. It is a subsidiary of IOK Company.

== List of works ==
Year	Title	Original title	Network	Notes	Ref.
2011	Sign	싸인	SBS TV	Production management; General marketing	
2011	Can You Hear My Heart?	내 마음이 들리니?	MBC TV	General marketing	
2011	Apink News	Apink News	TrendE	Production	
2012	Apink News Season 2	Apink News 2	TrendE	Production	
2012	Feast of the Gods	신들의 만찬	MBC TV	General marketing	
2012	Go Show	고쇼	SBS TV	Production	
2013	The Queen's Classroom	여왕의 교실	MBC TV	Co-produced with MBC	
2013	Waiting for Love	연애를 기대해	KBS2	Production	
2014	Cunning Single Lady	앙큼한 돌싱녀	MBC TV	Co-produced with Fantagio	
2015	Marriage, Not Dating	연애 말고 결혼	tvN	Production	
2015	Blood	블러드	KBS2	Production	
2015	Unkind Ladies	착하지 않은 여자들	KBS2	Production	
2017–2020	Stranger	비밀의 숲	tvN	Co-produced with Signal Entertainment Group	
