= Park Hae-jin =

South Korean actor and model (born 1983)

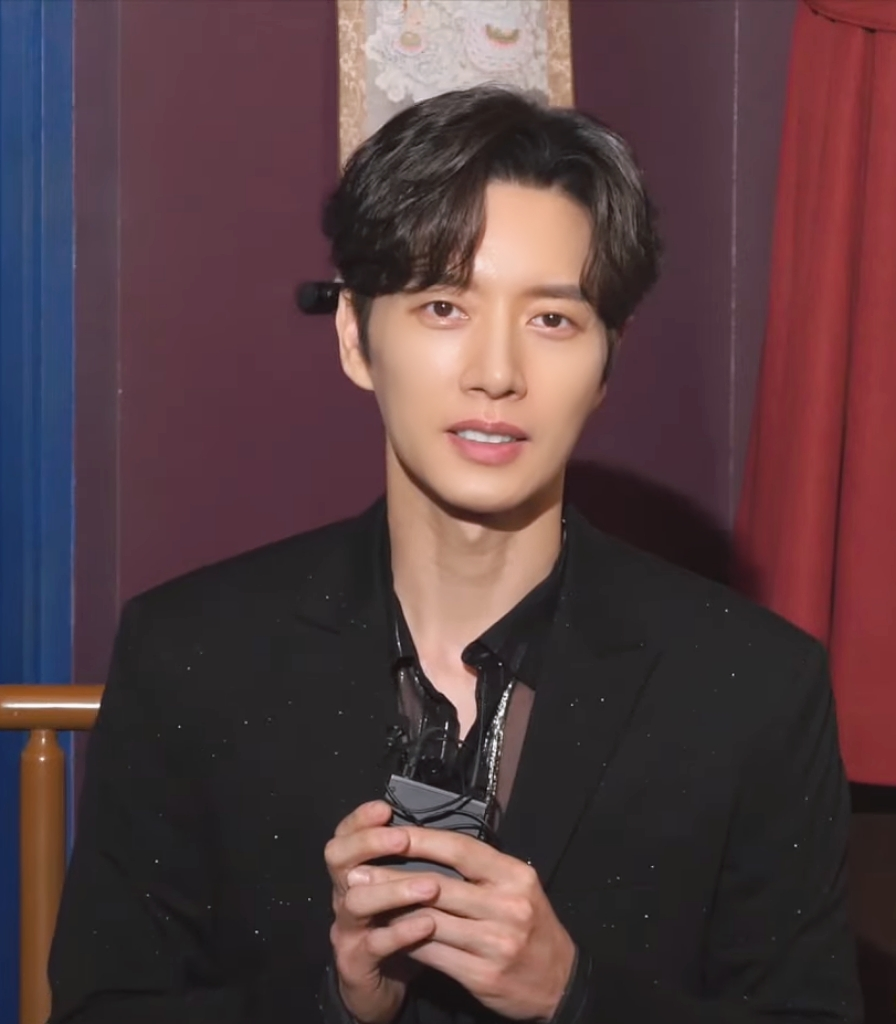
- Park in 2022
- Born: May 1, 1983 (age 43); Busanjin District, Busan, South Korea
- Occupations: Actor; model
- Years active: 2006–present
- Agent: Artist Company

Korean name
- Hangul: 박해진
- RR: Bak Haejin
- MR: Pak Haejin

Park Hae-jin (Korean: 박해진; born May 1, 1983) is a South Korean actor. He is best known for his supporting roles in dramas My Love from the Star (2013) and Doctor Stranger (2014), and his leading roles in Bad Guys (2014), Cheese in the Trap (2016), Man to Man (2017), Forest (2020), Kkondae Intern (2020), From Now On, Showtime! (2022), and The Killing Vote (2023).

== Career ==
=== 2006–2011: Beginnings ===
Park began his acting career in KBS weekend drama Famous Chil Princesses, for which he won the Best New Actor award at the 43rd Baeksang Arts Awards. He then starred in two highly successful TV projects - KBS daily drama Heaven & Earth with Han Hyo-joo, and MBC anniversary drama East of Eden. In 2009, Park joined the cast of SBS reality variety show Family Outing, which gave him more exposure. He then got his first lead role in the KBS youth drama Hot Blood.

=== 2012–2015: Rising popularity and East Asian success ===
In 2011, Park starred in first Chinese drama Qian Duo Duo Marry Remember (Chinese: 钱多多嫁人记), which aired on Hunan TV. The drama earned 1.5 billion views in two weeks and its broadcast rights were sold to Japan. Park won the 'Asia Star Award' at the 2012 LeTV Awards, making him the first Korean actor to receive the award. Park also starred in two other dramas Another Brilliant Life and Love Relativity. Due to his rising popularity, a cinema screen by Lotte Cinema in China was named after him.

He then returned to the small screen back in Korea, starring in Seoyoung, My Daughter (2012). The drama became the highest-rated Korean drama of 2013 with a peak rating of 47.6%, and Park gained more recognition with the public. This was followed by supporting roles in fantasy romance series My Love From the Star (2013) and medical drama Doctor Stranger (2014). Both dramas became successful in China, launching Park into stardom as a Hallyu star.

In late 2014, Park starred in OCN's crime thriller Bad Guys. He received the KDA Award at the 2015 Korea Drama Awards for his performance. In 2015, Park made his film debut as lead actor in the romance film Snow is on the Sea opposite Lee Young-ah.

=== 2016–present: Breakthrough in Korea ===
In 2016, Park played the leading role in tvN's Cheese in the Trap, adapted from the webtoon of the same name. The drama gained success in China, and topped Weibo's Korean-Japanese TV drama chart with over 1.9 billion views. Park experienced a rise in popularity and received increased endorsement offers. He also received the Best Actor award at the 2016 Korean Cable TV Awards. Following the success of Cheese in the Trap, Park was confirmed to reprise his role as Yoo Jung in the film adaptation of the webtoon, which was released in 2018.

The same year, he starred in Chinese drama Far Away Love, playing a successful businessman who owns an upscale restaurant and falls in love with a destitute woman. He was awarded the 'Male Actor of the Year' award at LeTV Entertainment Awards held in Beijing, China. Park's overseas success led to him being featured on Chinese postage stamps, making him the first Korean to be on Chinese stamps that are released as both regular issue and limited edition. On November 2, 2016, it was announced that Park would star in a web drama titled 7 First Kisses for Lotte Duty Free.

In 2017, Park's wax figure was unveiled at Madame Tussauds Hong Kong. The same year, he starred in JTBC's spy-action drama Man to Man. The drama drew attention in China and was heavily featured on local media despite the country's ban on Korean cultural content and celebrities.

In 2017, Park was cast in the romance thriller Four Men, which was set to air in 2018 but faced multiple delays and production was later cancelled due to contractual breach.

In 2020, Park starred in the romantic comedy drama Forest as a special emergency rescue team worker. The same year, he was cast in the revenge workplace drama Kkondae Intern.

In 2021, Park was cast in the romantic comedy drama From Now On, Showtime! as a popular magician who has the secret ability to see and communicate with ghosts. The drama premiered in April 2022.

In 2022, Park releases a second photobook, Only you Park Hae-jin, which will be published in late January 2022, and will be the release of the photobook in two years. Later, in June 2022, Park decided not to renew his contract with the original agency. In July 2022, Park signed a contract with Artist Company. In 2023, he was cast as the main lead in the crime drama The Killing Vote alongside Lim Ji-yeon and Park Sung-woong.

== Personal life ==
Park's parents were divorced when he was young and he moved back in with his mother after 17 years of separation. Park is known to be a collector of shoes, particularly sneakers. He has admitted to owning more than 2,200 pairs of footwear.

== Other activities ==
=== Ambassadorship ===
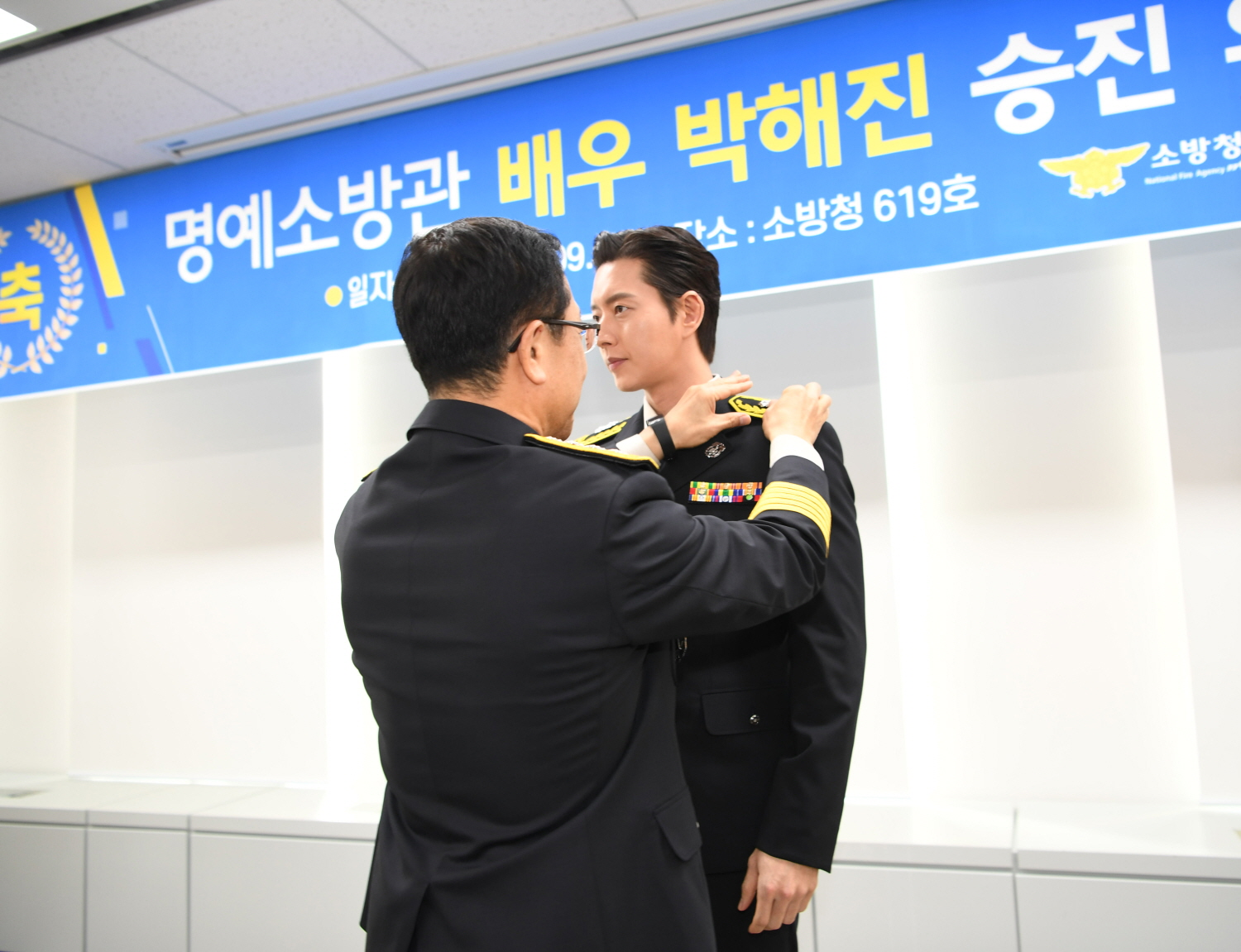
Park at 2019 Honorary Firefighter Rank Promotion Ceremony (Commissioner Jung Moon-ho)

Year	Title	Campaign organiser	Ref.
2007	Ambassador for Non-smoking and Non-drinking Campaign		
2008	Ambassador for Financial Savings	Korean Science and Arts Education Department	
2012	Culture Fund Promotion Ambassador	Chinese People's Association for Friendship with Foreign Countries	
2012	Promotional Ambassador for Youth Smoking Prevention Campaign		
2014	Promotional Ambassador for "Mu Qin Shui Jia" (大地之爱·母亲水窖)	Beijing Hua Bo Hospital	
2018	Honorary Firefighter	National Emergency Management Agency	
2019	Honorary Firefighter Promoted To Fire Marshall	National Emergency Management Agency	

=== Philanthropy ===
Park's consistent donations to various charities for the past few years which earned him the title "donation angel" in the entertainment industry. Mountain Movement confirmed Park has donated a total of 1.7 billion won (S$1.5 million) in various local and international charities since 2011.

In 2014, he was given the Civil Public Welfare Award in China. In 2015, Park became the 8th Korean celebrity to join the Honor Society by Community Chest of Korea. He was also the first recipient of the Haengbok Nanuminsang (행복나눔인상, "Happiness Sharer's Award"), given by the Minister of Health and Welfare.

Since 2015, Park has donated to the Hae Sim Won child welfare facility and has continued to do so regularly.

In 2017, Park began a campaign to reduce fine dust by planting trees in China where he and his fans donated 6520 trees. In April 2018, Park planted 6000 more trees together with his fans to help the battle against desertification in Western China.

== Filmography ==
=== Film ===
Year	Title	Role	Notes	Ref.
2010	The Rhythm of Chopsticks (젓가락)		Cameo	
2015	Snow is on the Sea (설해)	Lee Sang-woo		
2018	Cheese in the Trap	Yoo Jung		

=== Television series ===
Year	Title	Role	Notes	Ref.
2006	Famous Chil Princesses	Yeon Ha-nam		
2007	Heaven & Earth	Jung Moo-young		
2008	East of Eden	Shin Myung-hoon		
2009	Hot Blood	Ha Ryu		
2011	Qian Duo Duo Marry Remember	Xu Fei	Chinese drama	
2012	Another Kind of Splendid Life	Liu Da Ming	Chinese drama	
2012	Seoyoung, My Daughter	Lee Sang-woo		
2013	Love's Relativity	Li Ang	Chinese drama	
2013–2014	My Love from the Star	Lee Hwi-kyung		
2014	Doctor Stranger	Han Jae-joon / Lee Sung-hoon		
2014	Bad Guys	Lee Jung-moon		
2016	Cheese in the Trap	Yoo Jung		
2016	Far Away Love	Shen An	Chinese drama	
2017	Man to Man	Kim Seol-woo		
2020	Forest	Kang San-hyuk		
2020	Kkondae Intern	Ka Yeol-Chan		
2022	From Now On, Showtime!	Cha Cha-woong		
2023	The Killing Vote	Kim Moo-chan		

=== Web series ===
Year	Title	Role	Notes	Ref.
2016	7 First Kisses	Park Hae-jin	Ep. 2–3	
2021	Genesis	Kang Il-hoon/ Chen/ Baek Dong-jin/ Michael		

=== Television shows ===
Year	Title	Role	Notes	Ref.
2009–2010	Family Outing	Cast member		
2013	Little Big Hero	Narrator	Documentary	
2021	Park Hae Jin Random's Box	Host		

=== Music video appearances ===
Year	Artist	Title	Ref.
2007	The Way	"Love... It's Painful" (사랑 아프다)	
2016	Fiestar	"#Like"	

== Awards and nominations ==
Name of the award ceremony, year presented, category, nominee of the award, and the result of the nomination
Award ceremony	Year	Category	Nominee / Work	Result	Ref.
APAN Star Awards	2014	Excellence Award, Actor in a Miniseries	My Love from the Star	Nominated	
APAN Star Awards	2016	Excellence Award, Actor in a Miniseries	Cheese in the Trap	Nominated	
APAN Star Awards	2018	Global Star Award	Park Hae-jin	Won	
Asia Artist Awards	2016	Best Artist Award, Actor	Park Hae-jin	Won	
Asia Artist Awards	2017	Best Artist Award, Actor	Man to Man	Won	
Asia Artist Awards	2018	Asia Eco Creator	Park Hae-jin	Won	
Asia Model Awards (Note: Asia Model Awards is an annual ceremony that recognizes Asia's top models and celebrities.)	2009	Popular Star Award	Park Hae-jin	Won	
Asia Model Awards	2014	Asia Special Award	Park Hae-jin	Won	
Asia Model Awards	2016	Asia Star Award	Park Hae-jin	Won	
Baeksang Arts Awards	2007	Best New Actor – Television	Famous Chil Princesses	Won	
Civil Public Welfare Awards	2014	Civil Public Welfare Award	Park Hae-jin	Won	
KBS Drama Awards	2006	Best New Actor	Famous Chil Princesses	Won	
KBS Drama Awards	2006	Best Couple Award	Park Hae-jin with Lee Tae-ran; Famous Chil Princesses	Won	
KBS Drama Awards	2007	Excellence Award, Actor in a Daily Drama	Heaven & Earth	Won	
KBS Drama Awards	2007	Best Couple Award	Park Hae-jin with Han Hyo-joo; Heaven & Earth	Won	
KBS Drama Awards	2009	Excellence Award, Actor in a Mid-length Drama	Hot Blood	Nominated	
KBS Drama Awards	2012	Best Supporting Actor	Seoyoung, My Daughter	Nominated	
KBS Drama Awards	2020	Top Excellence Award, Actor	Forest	Nominated	
KBS Drama Awards	2020	Excellence Award, Actor in a Miniseries	Forest	Nominated	
KBS Drama Awards	2020	Netizen Award, Actor	Forest	Nominated	
KBS Drama Awards	2020	Best Couple Award	Park Hae-jin with Jo Bo-ah; Forest	Won	
KBS 119 Awards	2020	Special Service Award	Park Hae-jin	Won	
Korean Cable TV Awards	2016	Best Actor	Cheese in the Trap	Won	
Korea Drama Awards	2014	Excellence Award, Actor	My Love from the Star	Nominated	
Korea Drama Awards	2015	Top Excellence Award, Actor	Bad Guys	Nominated	
Korea Drama Awards	2015	KDA Award	Bad Guys	Won	
Korea Drama Awards	2016	Excellence Award, Actor	Cheese in the Trap	Nominated	
Korea Hallyu Awards	2018	Popular Culture Award	Park Hae-jin	Won	
Korea Lifestyle Awards	2015	Entertainer Award	Park Hae-jin	Won	
LeTV Entertainment Awards	2016	Actor of the Year	Far Away Love	Won	
LeTV Film & Drama Awards	2012	Best Asia Star Award	Qian Duo Duo Marry Remember	Won	
MBC Drama Awards	2008	Best New Actor	East of Eden	Won	
MBC Drama Awards	2020	Grand Prize (Daesang)	Kkondae Intern	Won	
MBC Drama Awards	2020	Top Excellence, Actor in a Wednesday-Thursday Miniseries	Kkondae Intern	Nominated	
MBC Drama Awards	2020	Best Couple Award	Park Hae-jin with Kim Eung-soo; Kkondae Intern	Nominated	
MBC Drama Awards	2022	Top Excellence Award, Actor in a Miniseries	From Now On, Showtime!	Nominated	
MBC Drama Awards	2022	Best Couple Award	Park Hae-jin with Jin Ki-joo; From Now On, Showtime!	Nominated	
Newsis K-Expo Cultural Awards	2020	Seoul Mayor Award	Park Hae-jin	Won	
SBS Drama Awards	2014	Excellence Award, Actor in a Drama Special	My Love from the Star	Nominated	
SBS Drama Awards	2023	Top Excellence Award, Actor in a Miniseries Genre/Action Drama	The Killing Vote	Nominated	
Seoul International Drama Awards	2021	Outstanding Korean Actor	Kkondae Intern	Nominated	
Style Icon Awards	2014	Top 10 Style Icons	Park Hae-jin	Won	
Style Icon Awards	2014	K-Style Award	Park Hae-jin	Won	
