= Cheese in the Trap (film) =

2018 film by Kim Je-young

- Theatrical release poster
- Directed by: Kim Je-young
- Written by: Soonkki; Kim Jun-ah
- Based on: Cheese in the Trap by Soonkki
- Produced by: Hwang Ji-sun
- Starring: Park Hae-jin; Oh Yeon-seo
- Production company: Mountain Movement Story
- Distributed by: Little Big Pictures
- Release date: 14 March 2018
- Running time: 116 minutes
- Country: South Korea
- Language: Korean
- Box office: US$1.8 million

Cheese in the Trap (Korean: 치즈 인 더 트랩) is a 2018 South Korean romantic comedy-drama film starring Park Hae-jin and Oh Yeon-seo, based on the Korean webtoon of the same name. It was released on March 14, 2018.

== Plot ==
Hong Seol (Oh Yeon-seo) is an ordinary university student. She is busy working part-time jobs to pay for her tuition fee and living expenses. Yoo Jung (Park Hae-Jin) is her senior at the same university. He seems perfect. He comes from a wealthy family, he is kind and handsome, but Hong Seol does not feel comfortable with Yoo Jung. Suddenly, Yoo Jung comes and talks to her. He wants to go out on a date and they begin an awkward relationship.

== Cast ==
- Park Hae-jin as Yoo Jung
- Oh Yeon-seo as Hong Seol
- Seo Kang-joon as Baek In-ho
- Yoo In-young as Baek In-ha
- Sandara Park as Jang Bo-ra
- Kim Hyun-jin as Kwon Eun-taek
- Oh Jong-hyuk as Oh Young-gon
- Moon Ji-yoon as Kim Sang-cheol
- Lee Jung-hyuk as Student
- Go Min-si as Female junior

== Production ==
The production was first announced in March 2016, and confirmed Park Hae-jin's return to reprise his role as Yoo Jung. It was announced that Kim Go-eun, the lead actress of the television adaptation, was not offered a role and a new actress would be sought. The Korean-Chinese production team held open casting auditions for the female lead in advance of shooting, which was scheduled to commence in early 2017. In August, it was announced that Oh Yeon-seo was cast as the female lead.

Filming officially commenced in April 2017.

== Release ==
The trailer of Cheese in the Trap was released on February 13, 2018 and it accumulated more than 2.4 million views within the first week.

On March 7, 2018, a press conference was held at CGV Yongsan-gu, Seoul. The main cast together with the director were present at the event.

The film premiered exclusively in CGV theatres on March 14, 2018.

=== Controversy on distribution and release ===
Due to the fact that Cheese in the Trap was released exclusively on CGV theatres, some Korean movie organizations questioned if that was showing "deepening monopoly" of the CJ Group-owned movie theatre chain. They also condemned the "double standard" of the management of the film's distributor, Little Big Pictures. The company was founded in 2013 by a consortium of producers and organizations that condemned the so-called "monopolistic and/or oligopolistic practices" of CGV and its sister company CJ E&M, Lotte Group's Lotte Cinema and Lotte Entertainment, Orion Group's Showbox, and JoongAng Media Network's Megabox.

Responding to the criticisms, Little Big Pictures CEO Kwon Ji-won said that "the exclusive release of Cheese in the Trap on CGV theatres were part of the company's distribution strategy".

== Reception ==
According to Korean Film Council, Cheese in the Trap came in third place at the local box office on its opening day by attracting 32,805 moviegoers. The film was shown 1,636 times on 346 screens in CGV theatres.

During the first weekend since the film was released, it drew 106,196 viewers and placed in top five at the weekend box office.
