= Josee, the Tiger and the Fish (2003 film) =

2003 Japanese film directed by Isshin Inudo

- DVD cover
- Directed by: Isshin Inudo
- Screenplay by: Aya Watanabe
- Based on: Josee, the Tiger and the Fish by Seiko Tanabe
- Produced by: Osamu Kubota
- Starring: Satoshi Tsumabuki; Chizuru Ikewaki; Juri Ueno; Hirofumi Arai; Eiko Shinya
- Cinematography: Christopher Doyle; Takahiro Tsutai
- Edited by: Soichi Ueno
- Music by: Quruli
- Production companies: IMJ Entertainment; Seven Network
- Distributed by: Asmik Ace
- Release date: 13 December 2003 (Japan)
- Running time: 116 minutes
- Countries: Australia; Japan
- Language: Japanese

Josee, the Tiger and the Fish (Japanese: ジョゼと虎と魚たち, Hepburn: Joze to Tora to Sakana-tachi) is a 2003 Japanese romantic drama film directed by Isshin Inudo and based on Seiko Tanabe's short story of the same name.

== Plot ==
Tsuneo Suzukawa is a university student, enjoying an easy-going lifestyle and working part-time at a mah-jong parlour. While walking his boss' dog, he sees a pram rolling down a hill and collide with a traffic barrier. The owner of the pram, an elderly woman, asks him to check to see if her granddaughter is safe. Upon inspecting it, Tsuneo finds a young woman named Kumiko. She and her grandmother invite Tsuneo to their home. There, Kumiko's grandmother tells Tsuneo that she regularly takes her granddaughter out for early morning walks in the pram since Kumiko cannot walk due to a disability, a fact her grandmother conceals from their neighbors. Tsuneo, fascinated by Kumiko and her strong willed personality, begins to visit regularly and the two become friends. During one of his later visits, Tsuneo asks Kumiko what her name is, despite already knowing from their first encounter. She tells him her name is Josee, after a character from her favorite book, and he begins referring to her.

At university, Tsuneo meets Kanae, a fellow student studying social care. Tsuneo asks her for advice on how to help Josee and her grandmother apply for welfare, and soon after the two start dating. After modifying the pram by attaching it to a skateboard, Tsuneo persuades Josee to sneak out while her grandmother is asleep and the two ride around the city. Upon their return, Josee's grandmother becomes angry at the risk they took and tells Tsuneo to leave. However, Tsuneo later manages to persuade her to apply for social welfare, allowing for their house to be renovated to make things easier for Josee. During the renovation, Josee finds out about Tsuneo and Kanae's relationship and becomes jealous. Josee's grandmother, wanting to protect Josee from heartbreak, tells Tsuneo to stop visiting once and for all. Tsuneo complies until a few days later, during the job interview he discovers that Josee's grandmother has died. He abruptly leaves the interview to go see Josee. The two have tea together, where Josee informs Tsuneo that she is coping fine on her own. Shortly after Tsuneo moves into the house, Josee encounters Kanae who accuses her of using her disability to manipulate Tsuneo. They have a brief altercation and Kanae walks away.

A year later, Tsuneo and Josee are happily living together. Tsuneo decides to take Josee home to attend a memorial service so his parents can meet her, borrowing a car from Josee's childhood friend Koji. They visit an aquarium along the way, but are disappointed to find it closed. After stopping at a rest area, Tsuneo changes his mind about the memorial and calls his younger brother to tell him he cannot make it home due to work, although his brother sees through his excuse and accuses him of chickening out. Tsuneo and Josee drive to a beach where Josee sees the ocean for the first time. They later spend the night at a love hotel, where Josee tells Tsuneo about how lonely her life had been before she met him. A few months later, Josee and Tsuneo break up. After leaving the house for the final time, Tsuneo meets up with his ex-girlfriend Kanae and they walk together. As they make their way down the street, Tsuneo breaks down.

== Cast ==
- Satoshi Tsumabuki as Tsuneo Suzukawa
- Chizuru Ikewaki as Josee
- Juri Ueno as Kanae
- Hirofumi Arai as Koji
- Eiko Shinya as Josee's grandmother
- Noriko Eguchi as Noriko
- Daigo Fujisawa as Ryuji

== Awards ==
Inudo won the Minister of Education New Director Award for Fine Art, and Satoshi Tsumabuki won the best actor awards from Kinema Junpo and from the Hochi Film Awards. The film became the fourth Japanese film of the year in the Kinema Junpo poll of film critics.
