= Josée (film) =

2020 South Korean film

- Theatrical release poster
- Directed by: Kim Jong-kwan
- Written by: Kim Jong-kwan
- Based on: Josee, the Tiger and the Fish by Seiko Tanabe
- Produced by: Lee Joon-sang
- Starring: Han Ji-min; Nam Joo-hyuk
- Cinematography: Cho Young-jik
- Edited by: Won Chang-jae
- Music by: Narae
- Production company: Vol Media
- Distributed by: Warner Bros. Pictures
- Release date: December 10, 2020 (South Korea)
- Running time: 117 minutes
- Country: South Korea
- Language: Korean

Josée is a 2020 South Korean romantic drama film based on a Japanese short story Josee, the Tiger and the Fish written by Seiko Tanabe. It was directed and written by Kim Jong-kwan. It stars actress Han Ji-min as Josée and actor Nam Joo-hyuk as Lee Young-seok. The film was released in South Korea on December 10, 2020.

== Plot ==
Josée (Han Ji-min) lives in a house where she and her grandmother live alone, reading and imagining her own world. Young-seok (Nam Joo-hyuk), who starts to feel special feelings for the woman he met by chance, begins to approach her slowly and sincerely.

The two begin a relationship and experience first love and heartbreak in all its pains and joys.

== Cast ==
- Han Ji-min as Josée
  - Park Seo-kyung as Young Josée
- Nam Joo-hyuk as Lee Young-seok
- Heo Jin as Mr. Dabok
- Park Ye-jin as Hye-seon
- Shim Wan-joon as Hye-seon's boyfriend
- Jung Yi-seo as Na-young
- Jo Bok-rae as Cheol-ho
- Lee So-hee as Soo-kyung
- Lee Sung-wook as Choi-kyung
