= Nam Joo-hyuk =

South Korean actor and model (born 1994)

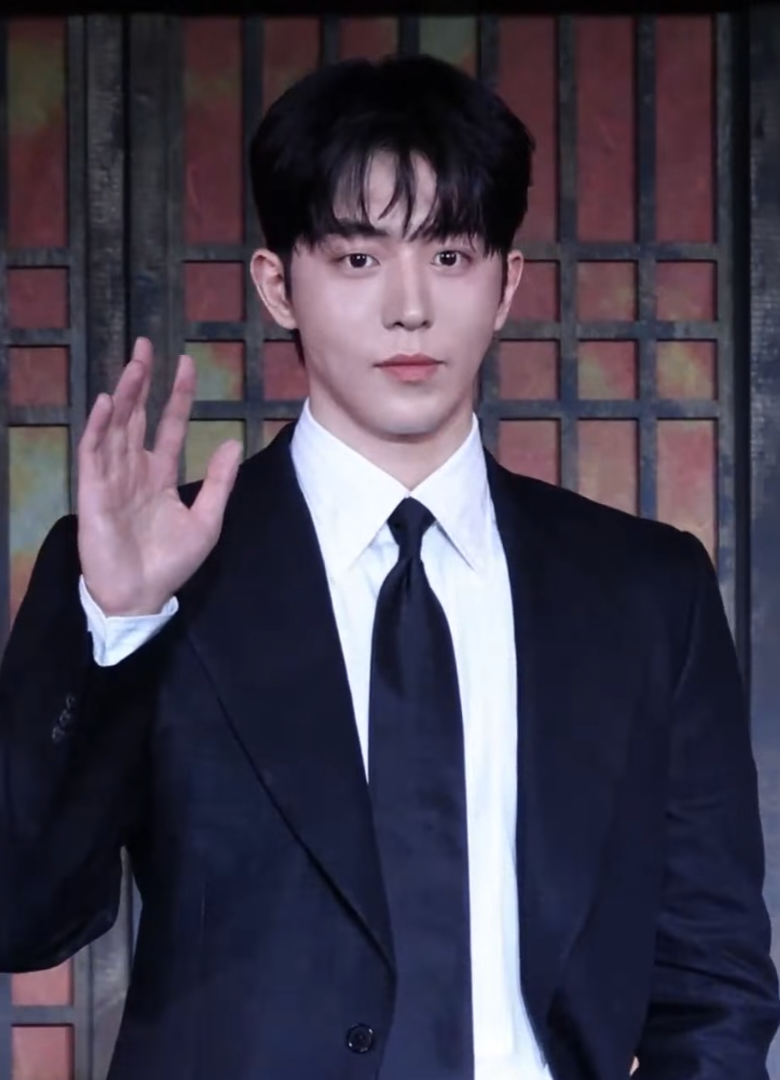
- Nam in July 2026
- Born: February 22, 1994 (age 32); Yeongdo District, Busan, South Korea
- Occupations: Model; actor
- Years active: 2013–present
- Agent: Fable Company
- Height: 187 cm (6 ft 2 in)

Korean name
- Hangul: 남주혁
- RR: Nam Juhyeok
- MR: Nam Chuhyŏk
- Website: msoopent.com

Signature
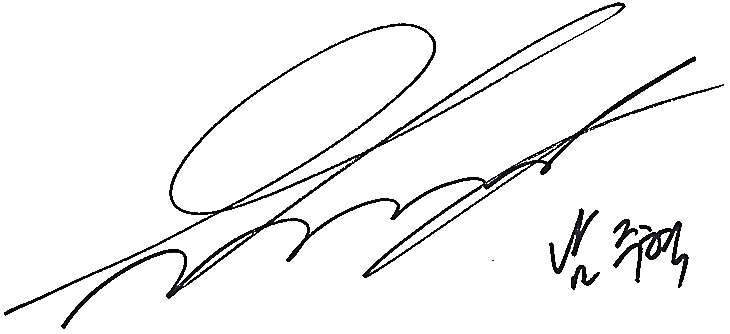

Nam Joo-hyuk (Korean: 남주혁; born February 22, 1994) is a South Korean model and actor. He began his career as a model and appeared in several music videos before making his screen debut in 2014 with the television series The Idle Mermaid. He gained wide recognition with his role in the dramas Who Are You: School 2015 (2015) and Weightlifting Fairy Kim Bok-joo (2016). In 2018, he had his film debut with The Great Battle, and achieved further prominence with dramas Start Up (2020) and Twenty-Five Twenty-One (2022). In 2021, Nam was included in Forbes 30 Under 30.

== Early life ==
Nam Joo-hyuk was born on February 22, 1994, in Yeongdo District, Busan, South Korea. During his studies in Gyeongnam Middle School, Nam dreamed of becoming a professional basketball player, hence he played on the basketball team for three years, however after sustaining an injury and later undergoing an operation, he was forced to quit basketball. After moving to Seoul, he won the contest Top Model which was sponsored by K-Plus. Soon after, Nam signed an exclusive contract under the modeling agency.

== Career ==
=== 2013–2014: YGKPlus and music video appearances ===
Nam debuted in 2013 as a model for the SONGZIO Homme 2014 S/S collection. In 2014, he appeared in the music videos 200% and Give Love of fellow YG Entertainment artist Akdong Musician. Soon after, he made his acting debut as a supporting role in the tvN drama, The Idle Mermaid.

=== 2015–2018: Rising popularity and film debut ===
Nam landed his first major role in KBS's coming-of-age teen drama Who Are You: School 2015, in which he portrayed a high school student named Han Yi-an, who experiences growing pains such as a crush on a schoolmate and injuries affecting his swimming career. He garnered attention with his appearance in the series, eventually winning several accolades including Best New Actor at the 4th APAN Star Awards and the Popularity Award at the 2015 KBS Drama Awards.

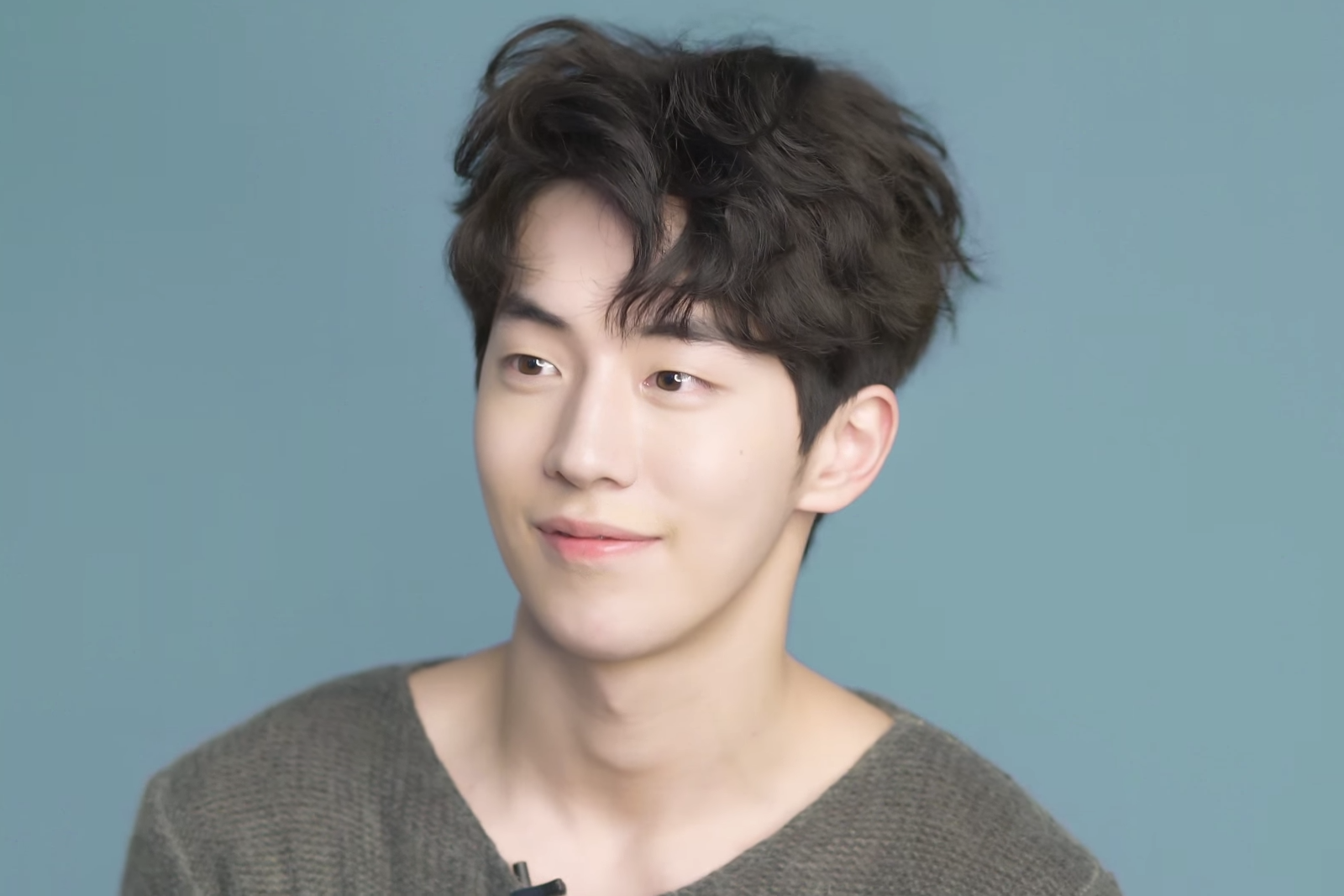
Nam for Beautypl in March 2017

In 2016, he played supporting roles in college romance series Cheese in the Trap and historical drama Moon Lovers: Scarlet Heart Ryeo. The same year, Nam became a cast member in the variety show Three Meals a Day. He then starred in his second lead role in the youth sports drama Weightlifting Fairy Kim Bok-joo alongside Lee Sung-kyung, portraying a talented yet playful swimmer named Jung Joon-hyung. Nam's performance in the series received favorable reviews and garnered him more widespread recognition.

In 2017, he led tvN's fantasy romance series The Bride of Habaek opposite Shin Se-kyung, wherein he portrayed a narcissistic Water God in pursuit of his rightful throne. Then in 2018, Nam starred in the historical film The Great Battle, which marked his big screen debut. Nam received acclaim for his performance, with Yoon Mi-sik of The Korea Herald writing that he "delivers a rock-solid portrayal of a wavering youth who is unsure of what is right or wrong." His performance in the film led him to win Best New Actor accolades at the prestigious Blue Dragon Awards.

=== 2019–present: Transition to leading roles ===
Nam starred in the fantasy romance drama The Light In Your Eyes alongside Han Ji-min and Kim Hye-ja in 2019, receiving positive reviews for his performance. In 2020, Nam starred in Netflix's supernatural crime drama The School Nurse Files and in the tvN romance series Start-Up. The same year, Nam also starred in the romance film Josée, a remake of the 2003 Japanese film Josee, the Tiger and the Fish. The film reunites Nam with The Light In Your Eyes co-star Han Ji-min. With the success of The School Nurse Files and Start-Up, Nam was featured in Forbes' 30 Under 30 Asia list under the "Entertainment & Sports" category in 2021.

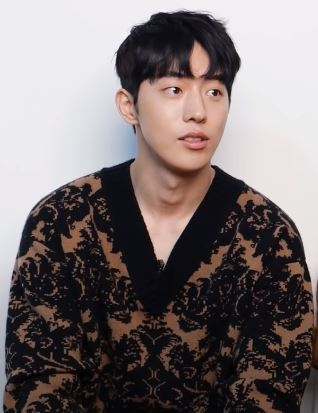
Nam for Marie Claire Korea in December 2020

Nam then worked with Kim Tae-ri in leading the tvN drama Twenty-Five Twenty-One. The series, which tells the story of love between a man and a woman who met in the midst of the IMF crisis set in 1998, premiered in February 2022. He received favorable reviews for his performance in portraying the character Baek Yi-jin, with Korean media outlet OSEN referring to Nam as the "symbol of youth" as they commended his acting skills which created what is known as the "Joohyuk's Pain" syndrome. Writer Kim Bo-ra cited his "solid physique, warm-hearted visuals, and deep sensibility" which made him "look like a character in a teen comic." Kim adds, "[Nam's] affectionate warm voice and clear gaze make viewers' hearts flutter and fall for Baek Yi-jin."

Nam starred in the film Remember, which was released theatrically on October 26, 2022. He played the role of a young man who helps an Alzheimer's patient commit revenge. His performance was described as one that was able to "show sympathy that transcends generations in a way only [Nam] can." In 2023, Nam starred in a leading role for the drama Vigilante, based on the Naver webtoon of the same name drawn by Kim Gyu-san. He portrayed a police college student who secretly operates as the titular vigilante.

In January 2026, Nam signed with Fable Company.

== Public image ==
=== Endorsements ===
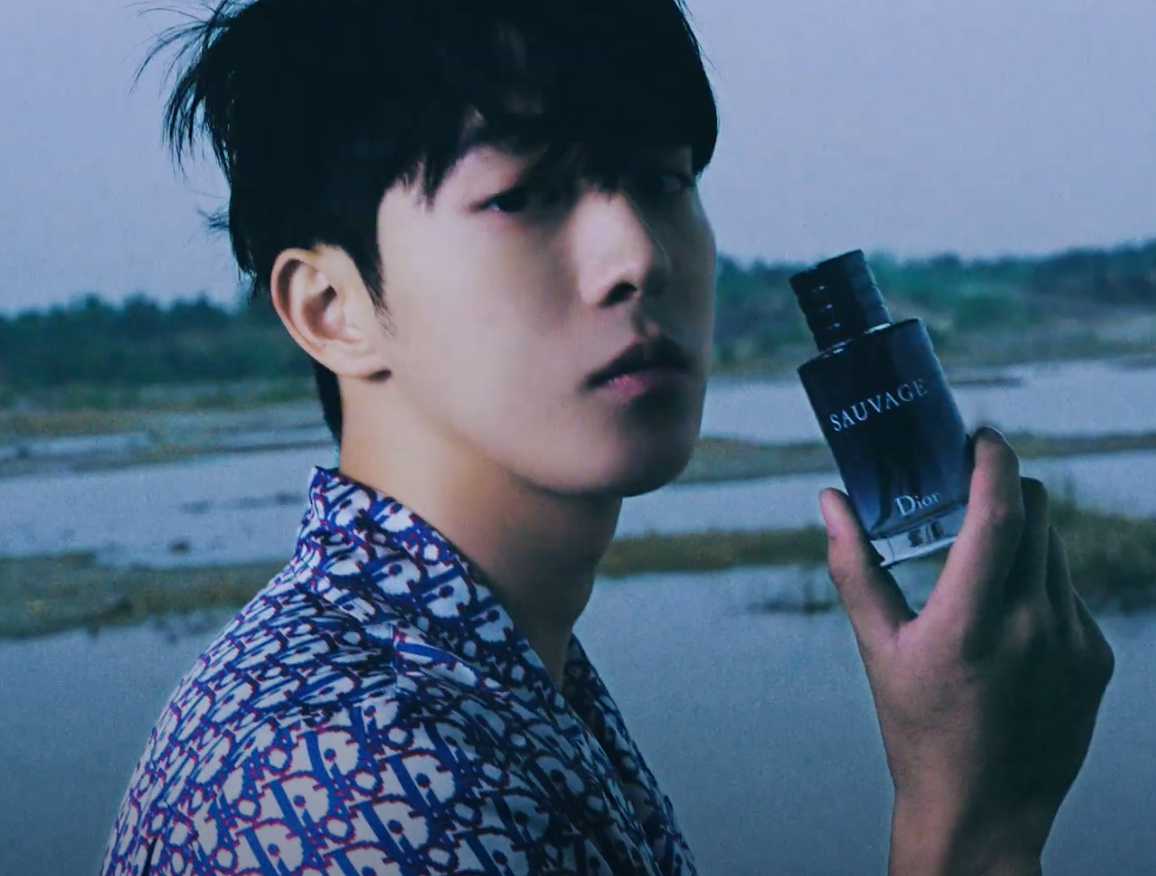
Nam featured in a promotional campaign for the Dior Sauvage fragrance line in Marie Claire Korea June issue, 2021

In November 2017, Penshoppe signed Nam as the new model of the clothing brand and he became one of its brand ambassadors. On April 17, 2019, it was officially announced that Nam was chosen as the brand ambassador of Dior Men in Asia.

=== Controversy ===
On June 20, 2022, a netizen alleged that he was a former victim of bullying and Nam was the perpetrator of his bullying during his six years in middle school and high school, claiming that Nam was part of a group of bullies that harassed him. Nam's management company denied the allegations and stated that they were untrue, and announced that they would seek criminal complaints against the netizen. On June 28, another person made school bullying accusations against Nam which were again denied by his management. On July 5, Korean news outlet Dispatch published an article containing statements of 20 people: 2 high school teachers and 18 classmates of Nam, defending him against the allegations. On March 28, 2024, the accuser of Nam has been found guilty of defamation and ordered to pay 7 million won in restitution to the actor by the Goyang District Court. The court stated that Nam did not bully the accuser during their six years of school together and was not associated with other bullies. Consequently, both defamers are equally responsible for defaming Nam with false allegations.

== Personal life ==
=== Military service ===
On October 17, 2022, it was reported that Nam would be enlisting in the military in December. The agency later confirmed that Nam was scheduled to serve in the mandatory military service in December but has not received an official summons. On January 31, 2023, it was confirmed that Nam will enlist in the Capital Defense Command Military Police Group as a military police officer riot squad on March 20, 2023. On March 31, 2023, it was reported that Nam had been appointed chief of the trainees at Nonsan Training Center, jointly with Y from Golden Child. After completing his training, he serves at the 32nd Division Military Police Unit (Baekryong Unit) in Geumnam-myeon. In September 2024, Nam Joo-hyuk was discharged of the mandatory military service and made his first public appearance post military service at Paris Fashion Week with Dior.

=== Philanthropy ===
On April 6, 2019, it was reported that Nam donated about ₩30 million to the Hope Bridge Association of the National Disaster Relief for the victims of the Gangwon Province wildfire in South Korea. In February 2020, he donated ₩50 million to the Daegu Social Welfare Community Chest to be used for quarantine supplies and medical support needed to prevent COVID-19.

== Filmography ==
=== Film ===
Key
†	Denotes films that have not yet been released

Year	Title	Role	Ref.
2018	The Great Battle	Sa-mool	
2020	Josee	Lee Young-seok	
2022	Remember	Park In-gyu	

=== Television series ===
Key
†	Denotes television productions that have not yet been released

Year	Title	Role	Ref.
2014	The Idle Mermaid	Park Dae-bak	
2015	Who Are You: School 2015	Han Yi-an	
2015	Glamorous Temptation	Jin Hyung-woo (young)	
2016	Cheese in the Trap	Kwon Eun-taek	
2016	Moon Lovers: Scarlet Heart Ryeo	13th Prince Baek-ah	
2016	Weightlifting Fairy Kim Bok-joo	Jung Joon-hyung	
2017	The Bride of Habaek	Habaek	
2019	The Light in Your Eyes	Lee Joon-ha / Kim Sang-hyeon	
2020	The School Nurse Files	Hong In-pyo	
2020	Start-Up	Nam Do-san	
2022	Twenty-Five Twenty-One	Baek Yi-jin	
2023	Vigilante	Kim Ji-yong	
2026	The East Palace	Gu-cheon	

=== Television shows ===
Year	Title	Role	Notes	Ref.
2014–2015	Off to School	Cast member		
2016	Celebrity Bromance	Cast member	with Ji Soo	
2016	Three Meals a Day: Gochang Village	Cast member	with Yoo Hae-jin, Cha Seung-won and Son Ho-jun	
2016	My Ear's Candy	Cast member		
2019	Coffee Friends	Cast member		
2021	Unexpected Business	Cast member		

=== Web shows ===
Year	Title	Role	Ref.
2014	Nam TV	Cast Member	

=== Music video appearances ===
Year	Song title	Artist	Ref.
2014	"200%"	Akdong Musician	
2014	"Give Love"	Akdong Musician	
2015	"Chocolate"	Kangnam feat. San E	
2018	"When It Snows"	1415 (Musical Duo)	

== Discography ==
=== Soundtrack appearances ===
List of soundtrack appearances with selected chart position, showing year released and album name
Title	Year	Peak chart position		Album
Title	Year	KOR		Album
Title	Year	Gaon	Hot	Album
"With" (with Kim Tae-ri, Kim Ji-yeon, Choi Hyun-wook and Lee Joo-myung)	2022	40	54	Twenty-Five Twenty-One OST

== Accolades ==
=== Awards and nominations ===
Name of the award ceremony, year presented, category, nominee of the award, and the result of the nomination
Award ceremony	Year	Category	Nominee / Work	Result	Ref.
APAN Star Awards	2015	Best New Actor	Who Are You: School 2015	Won	
Art Awards	2020	Mommeumme Award	Nam Joo-hyuk	Won	
Baeksang Arts Awards	2019	Best New Actor – Film	The Great Battle	Nominated	
Blue Dragon Film Awards	2018	Best New Actor	The Great Battle	Won	
Buil Film Awards	2019	Best New Actor	The Great Battle	Nominated	
Buil Film Awards	2019	Popular Star Award	The Great Battle	Nominated	
CFDK Awards	2014	Fashion Model of the Year Awards, Male Model Category	Nam Joo-hyuk	Won	
Chunsa Film Art Awards	2019	Best New Actor	The Great Battle	Nominated	
Director's Cut Awards	2022	Best New Actor - Film	Josée	Nominated	
Drama Fever Awards	2017	Rising Star Award	Cheese in the Trap	Won	
InStyle Star Icon	2016	Style Icon	Nam Joo-hyuk	Won	
KBS Drama Awards	2015	Best New Actor	Who Are You: School 2015	Nominated	
KBS Drama Awards	2015	Popularity Award, Actor	Who Are You: School 2015	Won	
KBS Drama Awards	2015	Best Couple Award (with Kim So-hyun)	Who Are You: School 2015	Nominated	
KOFRA Film Awards	2019	Best New Actor	The Great Battle	Won	
Korean Association of Film Critics Awards	2018	Best New Actor	The Great Battle	Won	
Korea Drama Awards	2015	Best New Actor	Who Are You: School 2015	Nominated	
Korea Drama Awards	2017	Best New Actor	Weightlifting Fairy Kim Bok-joo	Nominated	
KoreanUpdates Awards	2015	Best Couple Award (with Kim So-hyun)	Who Are You: School 2015	Nominated	
BIFF Marie Claire Asia Star Awards	2018	Rising Star Award	The Great Battle	Won	
MBC Drama Awards	2016	Excellence Award, Actor in a Miniseries	Weightlifting Fairy Kim Bok-joo	Nominated	
MBC Drama Awards	2016	Best New Actor	Weightlifting Fairy Kim Bok-joo	Won	
MBC Drama Awards	2016	Best Couple Award (with Lee Sung-kyung)	Weightlifting Fairy Kim Bok-joo	Nominated	
Soompi Awards	2016	Breakout Actor	Who Are You: School 2015	Won	
Soompi Awards	2016	Best Bromance (with Yook Sung-jae)	Who Are You: School 2015	Nominated	
Soompi Awards	2017	Best Kiss Award (with Shin Se-kyung)	The Bride of Habaek	Nominated	
Soompi Awards	2017	Best Couple Award (with Shin Se-kyung)	The Bride of Habaek	Nominated	
Seoul International Drama Awards	2021	Outstanding Korean Actor	Start-Up	Nominated	
The Seoul Awards	2018	Best New Actor (Film)	The Great Battle	Won	

=== Listicles ===
Name of publisher, year listed, name of listicle, and placement
Publisher	Year	Listicle	Placement	Ref.
Forbes	2020	Asia's 100 Digital Stars	Included	
Forbes	2021	30 Under 30 – Asia	Included	
Forbes	2023	Korea Power Celebrity 40	36th	
