= Bad Guys (South Korean TV series) =

South Korean television series

- Promotional poster for Bad Guys
- Also known as: Bad Boys
- Genre: Police procedural Crime; Thriller; Action
- Created by: Park Ji-young (CJ ENM); Kim Cheol-yeon
- Written by: Han Jung-hoon
- Directed by: Kim Jung-min
- Starring: Kim Sang-joong; Park Hae-jin; Ma Dong-seok; Jo Dong-hyuk; Kang Ye-won
- Composer: Kim Jang-woo
- Country of origin: South Korea
- Original language: Korean
- No. of episodes: 11

Production
- Executive producer: Park Ho-shik
- Production location: Korea
- Camera setup: Single camera
- Running time: 60
- Production company: Urban Works Media

Original release
- Network: OCN
- Release: October 4 – December 13, 2014

Related
- Bad Guys 2

Bad Guys (Korean: 나쁜 녀석들; RR: Nappeun nyeoseokdeul) is a 2014 South Korean television series starring Kim Sang-joong, Park Hae-jin, Ma Dong-seok, Jo Dong-hyuk and Kang Ye-won. It aired on OCN from October 4 to December 13, 2014, on Saturdays at 22:00 for 11 episodes.

== Plot ==
Reinstated to eradicate the worst crimes in the city, Detective Oh Gu-tak (Kim Sang-joong) requests the release of three convicts, Park Woong Chul (Ma Dong Seok), a gangster, Jung Tae Soo (Jo Dong Hyuk) a hired hitman who suddenly turned himself, and Lee Jung Moon (Park Hae Jin) a serial killer with a genius IQ who cannot remember the murders he was imprisoned for, to enlist their help in catching the felons.

With years being taken from their prison sentences for every criminal they catch, will Park Woong Chul, Jung Tae Soo, and Lee Jung Moon help to combat the rise in violent crimes?

== Cast ==
- Kim Sang-joong as Oh Gu-tak
- Ma Dong-seok as Park Woong-Cheol
- Park Hae-jin as Lee Jung-moon
- Jo Dong-hyuk as Jung Tae-soo
- Kang Ye-won as Yoo Mi-young
- Kang Shin-il as Nam Gu-hyeon
- Kwon Hae-seong as nam geon wook
- Min Ji-ah as Park Seon-jeong
- Hwang Seung-eon as Yang Yoo-jin
- Park Jung-hak as Lee Doo-kwang
- Kim Tae-hoon as Oh Jae-won
- Ki Se-hyung as Kang Doo-man
- Kim Jae-seung as Woo Hyun-woo
- Kim Sung-hoon as Lee Seok-jin
- Son Se-bin as Jung Hon-ja, Hyun-woo's fiancée
- Jeon Jin-seo as Kim Young-joon
- Seo Hye-jin as Shin So-jung
- Nam Sung-jin as Kim Dong-ho
- Park Jung-woo as Son Moon-ki
- Park Hyo-jun as Yoon Chul-joo
- Park Sung-taek as Kim Do-shik
- Nam Tae-boo as Korean-Chinese man
- Kim Byung-choon as Serial killer obsessed with blood
- Lee Yong-nyeo as Hwang Kyung-soon
- Jang Seon-ho as Park Jong-seok
- Kim Hye-yoon as Oh Ji-yun, Gu-tak's daughter

== Ratings ==
In this table, the blue numbers represent the lowest ratings and the red numbers represent the highest ratings.

Ep.	Original broadcast date	Title	Average audience share	
Ep.	Original broadcast date	Title	AGB Nielsen	
Ep.	Original broadcast date	Title	Nationwide	Seoul
1	October 4, 2014	Crazy Dogs	1.3%	1.510%
02	October 11, 2014	Outlaw	2.167%	2.651%
03	October 18, 2014	Human Market	2.384%	2.625%
04	October 25, 2014	Too Many Bad Guys	3.551%	4.324%
05	November 1, 2014	Reason for Murder	3.779%	4.686%
06	November 8, 2014	Desperate Chase	3.822%	3.907%
07	November 15, 2014	In the Line of Fire	3.329%	3.625%
08	November 22, 2014	Truth's Shadow	3.214%	3.266%
09	November 29, 2014	Tropical Night	2.930%	2.978%
10	December 6, 2014	The Knife Is Dancing	3.307%	3.910%
11	December 13, 2014	Back to the World	4.128%	4.101%
Average			3.083%	3.417%

== Awards and nominations ==
Year	Award	Category	Recipient	Result
2015	51st Baeksang Arts Awards	Best Director	Kim Jung-min	Nominated
2015	8th Korea Drama Awards	Top Excellence Award, Actor	Park Hae-jin	Nominated
2015	8th Korea Drama Awards	KDA Award	Park Hae-jin	Won
2015	10th Seoul International Drama Awards	Best Mini-series	Bad Guys	Nominated

== International broadcast ==
The drama is available to stream on Netflix with a variety of subtitles in North America, Malaysia, Thailand, Indonesia, the Philippines and Sri Lanka.

=== Adaptation ===
The series has been adapted for Indonesian streaming platform Vidio as their first Korean drama adaptation, Bad Guys co-produced by BASE Entertainment and CJ ENM Hong Kong. The teaser of the series was firstly unveiled at the 19th Jogja-NETPAC Asian Film Festival following 3 months of filming across Indonesia, with the series set to be premiered on February 21, 2025.
