= Kkondae Intern =

2020 South Korean television series

- Promotional poster
- Also known as: Old School Intern
- Hangul: 꼰대인턴
- RR: Kkondaeinteon
- MR: Kkondaeint'ŏn
- Genre: Comedy drama
- Written by: Shin So-ra
- Directed by: Nam Sung-woo
- Starring: Park Hae-jin; Kim Eung-soo
- Country of origin: South Korea
- Original language: Korean
- No. of episodes: 24 (Note: In order to circumvent Korean laws that prevent commercial breaks in the middle of an episode, what would previously have been aired as single 70 minute episodes are now being repackaged as two 35 minute episodes, with two episodes being shown each night with a commercial break between the two.)

Production
- Executive producer: Hong Seok-woo
- Producers: Jung Koo-young; Yoon Hong-mi; Kim Ji-ha; Moon Ju-hee
- Camera setup: Single-camera
- Running time: 35 minutes
- Production company: Studio HIM

Original release
- Network: MBC TV
- Release: May 20 – July 1, 2020

Kkondae Intern (Korean: 꼰대인턴) is a 2020 South Korean television series starring Park Hae-jin and Kim Eung-soo. The workplace comedy-drama series is about what happens when a man finally gets a chance to lord over a previous boss, who made his life miserable during his rookie days with his old school ways. It aired every Wednesday and Thursday starting from May 20, 2020 on MBC TV.

== Synopsis ==
Kkondae Intern is an office comedy that depicts a man's delightful revenge on his previous boss, who was also his worst manager.

Ka Yeol-chan (Park Hae-jin) had a bad internship experience because of a nasty and overbearing boss. He quits his job and starts working in a ramen company. With his sheer hard work, he develops a chicken noodle recipe — which becomes a top product — and gets elevated to the position of general manager.

Lee Man-sik (Kim Eung-soo) is a manager in the Ongol Ramen Department, and has a reputation as a "terror senior".

After 30 years in the company, he loses hope of being promoted to an executive position before retirement. So he takes and passes the Senior Internship at Junsu Food.

A reversal of fate occurs, and now Lee Man-sik starts working as an intern at the same company and is assigned under Ka Yeol-chan.

== Cast ==
=== Main ===
- Park Hae-jin as Ka Yeol-chan
- Kim Eung-soo as Lee Man-sik

=== Supporting ===
- Han Ji-eun as Lee Tae-ri.

One of the three interns that joins the Sales & Marketing Team of Joonsu Food. She is the daughter of Lee Man-sik.

- Park Ki-woong as Namgoong Joon-soo

President of Joonsu Food and son of Namgoong Pyo.

- Park Ah-in as Tak Jung-eun

Contract worker under the Sales & Marketing Team of Joonsu Food. She is the ex-Girlfriend of Ka Yeol-Chan.

- Noh Jong-hyun as Joo Yoon-soo

One of the three interns that joins the Sales & Marketing Team of Joonsu Food.

- Go Geon-han as Oh Dong-geun
- Kim Hyun-mok as Park Cheol-min
- Hong Seung-bum as Kim Seung-jin
- Kim Sun-young as Koo Ja-sook
- Son Jong-hak as An Sang-jong
- Ko In-beom as Namgoong pyo

Chairman of Joonsu Food and father of Namgoong Joon-soo.

- Kim Ki-cheon as Eom Han-gil
- Moon Sook as Ok-kyung
- Jang Sung-kyu as Park Beom-jun

== Original soundtrack ==
Part	Artist	Title	Release date
Part 1	Young Tak	Kkondae Latte	May 21, 2020
Part 2	Lee Chan-won	Fate in Time	May 27, 2020
Part 3	Kim Hee-jae	Uphill	June 4, 2020
Part 4	Lee Soo-young	Shine Bright	June 10, 2020
Part 5	Jang Min-ho	Hit The Jackpot	June 18, 2020

== Ratings ==
- In this table, the blue numbers represent the lowest ratings and the red numbers represent the highest ratings.
- N/A denotes that the rating is not known.

Ep.	Original broadcast date	Average audience share		
Ep.	Original broadcast date	Nielsen Korea		TNmS
Ep.	Original broadcast date	Nationwide	Seoul	Nationwide
1	May 20, 2020	4.4%	4.9%	4.9%
2	May 20, 2020	6.5%	7.2%	6.9%
3	May 21, 2020	3.5%	—N/a	—N/a
4	May 21, 2020	4.7%	4.6%	—N/a
5	May 27, 2020	4.2%	4.5%	—N/a
6	May 27, 2020	6.4%	7.0%	7.1%
7	May 28, 2020	3.7%	3.7%	—N/a
8	May 28, 2020	4.9%	4.9%	4.4%
9	June 3, 2020	4.9%	5.4%	5.1%
10	June 3, 2020	5.1%	7.1%	6.5%
11	June 4, 2020	4.8%	5.5%	—N/a
12	June 4, 2020	6.3%	6.9%	6.5%
13	June 10, 2020	5.6%	6.4%	—N/a
14	June 10, 2020	7.1%	8.2%	5.5%
15	June 11, 2020	4.4%	4.8%	—N/a
16	June 11, 2020	5.8%	6.0%	5.9%
17	June 17, 2020	4.1%	—N/a	—N/a
18	June 17, 2020	5.5%	6.1%	5.1%
19	June 18, 2020	5.1%	5.8%	—N/a
20	June 18, 2020	6.1%	6.8%	5.6%
21	June 24, 2020	4.8%	5.5%	5.5%
22	June 24, 2020	6.6%	7.5%	6.8%
23	July 1, 2020	4.9%	5.3%	5.6%
24	July 1, 2020	6.2%	6.8%	6.8%
Average		5.2%	— (Note: Due to some ratings not recorded, the exact average rating is unknown.)	—

== Awards and nominations ==
Year	Award	Category	Nominee	Result	Ref.
2020	MBC Drama Awards	Grand Prize (Daesang)	Park Hae-jin	Won	
2020	MBC Drama Awards	Drama of the Year	Kkondae Intern	Won	
2020	MBC Drama Awards	Top Excellence Award, Actor in a Wednesday-Thursday Miniseries	Kim Eung-soo	Won	
2020	MBC Drama Awards	Top Excellence Award, Actor in a Wednesday-Thursday Miniseries	Park Hae-jin	Nominated	
2020	MBC Drama Awards	Excellence Award, Actor in a Wednesday-Thursday Miniseries	Park Ki-woong	Nominated	
2020	MBC Drama Awards	Excellence Award, Actress in a Wednesday-Thursday Miniseries	Han Ji-eun	Nominated	
2020	MBC Drama Awards	Best Supporting Actress	Kim Sun-young	Won	
2020	MBC Drama Awards	Best New Actor	Noh Jong-hyun	Nominated	
2020	MBC Drama Awards	Best Couple Award	Park Hae-jin and Kim Eung-soo	Nominated	
