= Heaven & Earth (TV series) =

Television program

- Promotional poster
- Also known as: As Much as Heaven and Earth; By Land and Sky; High as the Sky, Wide as the Earth
- Genre: Romance, Drama, Family
- Written by: Choi Hyun-kyung
- Directed by: Moon Bo-hyun
- Starring: Park Hae-jin; Han Hyo-joo; Kang Jung-hwa; Lee Joo-hyun; Hong Soo-ah
- Country of origin: South Korea
- Original language: Korean
- No. of episodes: 165

Production
- Producer: Go Young-tak
- Production location: Korea
- Running time: 30 minutes

Original release
- Network: KBS1
- Release: January 15 – August 31, 2007

Heaven & Earth (Korean: 하늘만큼 땅만큼; RR: Haneulmankeum ttangmankeum; lit. Like Land and Sky) is a 2007 South Korean television series starring Park Hae-jin, Han Hyo-joo, Lee Joo-hyun, Kang Jung-hwa, and Hong Soo-ah. It aired on KBS1 from January 15 to August 31, 2007 on Mondays to Fridays at 20:25 for 165 episodes.

The daily drama was a hit, maintaining an average viewership rating of 30% throughout its nine-month run. Its peak viewership rating of 36.1% (on episode 164) made it the third highest-rated Korean drama of 2007.

== Plot ==
Jung Mu-young (Park Hae-jin) was left by his birth mother under the care of Kim Tae-shik (Jung Han-yong) and his wife Park Myung-ja (Jung Ae-ri) when he was very young. His mother promises to come for him later, but she never does. The Kim family raise Mu-young like he is their own son, but never change his family name because they think his birth mother might come later to pick him up. Despite the lack of money, Myung-ja manages to keep the family together; moreover, she never once treats Mu-young any differently than her biological son. Still, having a different family name from his older brother Kim Sang-hyun (Lee Joo-hyun) makes him run away from home several times. Mu-young is outwardly rebellious, unforgiving, and in constant conflict with his family. He keeps an emotional distance from them, for fear of getting hurt one day. At school he meets the cheerful and kindhearted Seok Ji-soo (Han Hyo-joo), who not only values her family greatly, but also goes out of her way to help others. Thinking too highly of Ji-Soo and too lowly of himself, and aware of the possible negative reaction her family might have toward his confession to her, he tries to keep a distance between himself and Ji-Soo.

As a grown up, Ji-soo begins working for Myung-ja's stepsister, Park Myung-joo (Yoon Hae-young), and learns that she and her single father, Seok Jong-hoon (Hong Yo-seob), are in love. She fully supports her father's newfound romance. She is also seeing a rich family's son who wants to propose to her.

Heaven & Earth tackles the issues the modern family faces, such as the difficulties faced by stepparents and stepchildren; conflicts between biological and adoptive parents; the aftermath of a remarriage; and the high divorce rate among the younger generation, and resulting involuntary childcare from their grandparents.

== Cast ==
=== Main cast ===
- Park Hae-jin as Jung Mu-young
- Han Hyo-joo as Seok Ji-soo
- Kang Jung-hwa as Yoon Eun-joo
- Lee Joo-hyun as Kim Sang-hyun
- Hong Soo-ah as Yoon Eun-ha

=== Supporting cast ===
Kim family

- Jung Han-yong as Kim Tae-shik, Sang-hyun and Mu-young's father
- Jung Ae-ri as Park Myung-ja, Sang-hyun's mother
- Ban Hyo-jung as Han Bong-rye, Myung-ja's mother
- Jung Jae-soon as Lee Soon-im, Myung-ja's stepmother
- Yoon Hae-young as Park Myung-joo, Soon-im's daughter
- Kim Il-woo as Park Myung-tae, Myung-ja's younger brother

Seok family

- Hong Yo-seob as Seok Jong-hoon, Ji-soo's father
- Seo Jae-kyung as Seok Ji-woong, Ji-soo's older brother
- Kang Rae-yeon as Se Mi-ae, Ji-woong's wife

Yoon family

- Jung Dong-hwan as Yoon Jae-doo, Eun-joo and Eun-ha's father
- Kim Ja-ok as Ahn Hye-kyung, Eun-joo and Eun-ha's mother

Extended cast

- Choi Won-young as Jang Young-min
- Han Jin-hee as President Jang, Young-min's father
- Seo Jun-young as Song Ji-min
- Lee Hye-sook as Jin-sook
- Park Hyo-bin
- Han Young-kwang

== Awards ==
2007 KBS Drama Awards

- Excellence Award, Actor in a Serial Drama: Park Hae-jin
- Popularity Award: Han Hyo-joo
- Best Couple Award: Park Hae-jin and Han Hyo-joo
