= Park Seo-kyung =

South Korean television and film actress (born 2009)

- Born: October 18, 2009 (age 17); South Korea
- Occupation: Actress
- Years active: 2019–present
- Agent: BH Entertainment

Korean name
- Hangul: 박서경
- RR: Bak Seogyeong
- MR: Pak Sŏgyŏng

Park Seo-kyung (Korean: 박서경; born on October 18, 2009) is a South Korean actress. She made her acting debut in 2019 television series Possessed. She is known for her role in historical drama The Red Sleeve as Hong Dan, and later as Royal Noble Consort Wonbin Hong. She has acted in 2020 film Josée.

== Career ==
Park made her debuted in 2019 with the television series Possessed as child actress.

In 2020, Park played the role of young version of Han Ji-min's role in film Josée.

In 2021, she was in historical drama The Red Sleeve as Hong Dan and later as Royal Noble Consort Wonbin Hong.

In 2022, she appeared in tvN's television series Island. She also appeared in TV Chosun's television series Love (ft. Marriage and Divorce).

In 2023, she was main lead of the 14th season of Drama Special's, fifth episode titled "Dog Days of Summer" as Han Yeo-reum. She spoke Daegu dialect in the episode. Park signed an exclusive contract with BH Entertainment in 2023.

In 2025, Park is appearing in Netflix miniseries You and Everything Else as teen Cheon Sang-yeon, played by Park Ji-hyun, and in MBN's TV series First Lady as Hyun Ji-yo.

== Filmography ==
=== Film ===
Year	Title	Role	Notes/Ref.
2020	Josée	young Josée	
2026	Still Shining	17-year-old Sun-ok	Releasing at BIFF

=== Television series ===
Year	Title	Role	Notes	Ref.
2019	Possessed	Eun-ji		
2019	Secret Boutique	10 year-old Jang Do-yeong		
2020	When the Weather Is Fine	young Hae-won		
2020	It's Okay to Not Be Okay	young Nam Ju-ri		
2020	Homemade Love Story	young Lee Bit-chae-eun		
2021	Love (ft. Marriage and Divorce)	Shin Ji-ah	Season 2–3	
2021–2022	The Red Sleeve	Hong Dan / Royal Noble Consort Wonbin Hong		
2022	Forecasting Love and Weather	young Jin Ha-kyung		
2022	Island	young Won Mi-ho / Wonjeong		
2023	KBS Drama Special: "Dog Days of Summer"	Han Yeo-reum	Season 14 (Episode 5)	
2025	You and Everything Else	young Cheon Sang-yeon		
2025	First Lady	Hyun Ji-yo		
2026	Mad Concrete Dreams	Ki Da-rae		
