= Moon Ji-yoon =

South Korean actor (1984–2020)

- Born: February 18, 1984; Seoul, South Korea
- Died: March 18, 2020 (aged 36)
- Other names: Ji-Yun Mun, Mun Ji Yun
- Education: Kwangwoon University
- Occupations: Actor; model
- Years active: 2002–2020
- Agent: Dream Stone Entertainment
- Known for: Cheese in the Trap; Weightlifting Fairy Kim Bok-joo

Moon Ji-yoon (18 February 1984 – March 18, 2020) was a South Korean actor and model. He was best known for his supporting roles in Cheese in the Trap TV series and its film adaptation and Weightlifting Fairy Kim Bok-joo.

== Biography ==
Moon Ji-yoon was born on February 18, 1984. He started his acting career in 2002 and also did modeling. He had supporting roles in dramas such as Cheese in the Trap series, its film adaptation and Weightlifting Fairy Kim Bok-joo.

=== Death ===
Moon died on March 18, 2020. His agency Dream Stone Entertainment stated that he died due to sore throat condition. His parents held the funeral privately.

== Filmography ==
=== Film ===
Year	Title	Role	Language	Ref.
2004	Spin Kick	Hyuk Soo	Korean	
2006	Mr. Wacky	Lee Hyun Joon	Korean	
2012	Whatcha Wearin'?	Yeong Min	Korean	
2017	The Merciless	Young Geun	Korean	
2018	Cheese in the Trap	Kim Sang Chul	Korean	

=== Television ===
Year	Title	Role	Ref.
2002	Romance	Choi Jang Bi	
2002	I Love Hyun Jung	Lee Hyun Do	
2003	Twenty Years	Kim Sang Hyuk	
2005	Sassy Girl Chun-hyang	Pang Ji Hyuk	
2005	The Rules of Love	Kim In Soo	
2006	How Much Love?	Suh Dong Suk	
2008	Iljimae	Dae Shik	
2009	Queen Seondeok	Shi Yeol	
2010	Pink Lipstick	Yoo Sung Eun	
2012	Big	Na Hyo Sang	
2012	May Queen	Chun Sang Tae	
2014	KBS Drama Special: I Introduce My Father	Go Soo Cheol	
2015	Songgot: The Piercer	Lee Tae Kyung	
2016	Cheese in the Trap	Kim Sang Chul	
2016	The Sound of Your Heart	Jo Suk's colleague	
2016	Weightlifting Fairy Kim Bok-joo	Sung Chul	
2019	The Golden Garden	Lee Seong Wook	
2020	How Are U Bread	Patrick	
