= First Lady (South Korean TV series) =

2025 South Korean television series

- Promotional poster
- Hangul: 퍼스트레이디
- RR: Peoseuteu reidi
- MR: P'ŏsŭt'ŭ reidi
- Genre: Melodrama; Political thriller
- Written by: Kim Hyeong-wan
- Directed by: Lee Ho-hyeon
- Starring: Eugene; Ji Hyun-woo; Lee Min-Young
- Music by: Cho Kyu-man
- Country of origin: South Korea
- Original language: Korean
- No. of episodes: 12

Production
- Running time: 70 minutes
- Production companies: Studio Jidam: Artist Studio; Roadshow Plus Co., Ltd

Original release
- Network: MBN
- Release: September 24 – October 30, 2025

First Lady (Korean: 퍼스트레이디) is a 2025 South Korean television series starring Eugene, Ji Hyun-woo, and Lee Min-Young. It aired on MBN from September 24, to October 30, 2025, every Wednesday and Thursday at 22:20 (KST).

== Synopsis ==
The series revolves around a newly elected president who seeks a divorce from his first wife. The series depicts the political intrigue and family secrets that unfold amidst the intense conflict between the president-elect and his wife during the 67 days remaining until his inauguration.

== Cast ==
=== Main ===
- Eugene as Cha Soo-yeon
- Ji Hyun-woo as Hyun Min-cheol
- Lee Min-young as Shin Hae-rin

=== Supporting ===
- Han Soo-ah as Lee Hwa-jin
- Park Seo-koung as Hyun Ji-yo
- Kim Beok Kyung-hui as Sung Hyun-sook
- Kang Seong-oh as Kang Seon-ho
- Shin So-yul as Son Min-joo
- Kim Ki-bang as Yoon Ki-joo
- Oh Seung-eun as Choi Myung-joo
- Heo Jin as Ha Geom-sook
- Jeon No-min as Cha Jin-taek
- Lee Myung-hoon as Lee Beom-sook
- Goo Seok-dae as Lee Hyun-jyo
- Do-yoo as Cha Jung-yeon
- Lim Hyun-seong as Cheon Tim-jang
- Son Ji-na as Bae Young-seon
- Kim Kyu-nam as Seon Soo-mi

== Production ==
=== Development ===
On April 22, 2025, Maeil Business Newspaper Group, owner of MBN, announced that it would invest approximately ₩18 billion in artist group, with the goal of co-producing content. The first project will be the drama First Lady. It is directed by Lee Ho-hyeon and written by Kim Hyeong-wan. It will be produced by Studio Jidam, Artist Studio, and Roadshow Plus Co., Ltd.

=== Casting ===
The main cast was confirmed on April 17, 2025. They are Eugene, Ji Hyun-woo, and Lee Min-young.

== Release ==
The first teaser trailer was released on August 7, 2025, and the series is scheduled to premiere on MBN on September 24, 2025.

== Viewership ==
First Lady : South Korea viewers per episode (thousands)

Season	Episode number												Average
Season	1	2	3	4	5	6	7	8	9	10	11	12	Average
1	443	N/A	436	418	399	N/A	412	N/A	N/A	365	N/A	N/A	N/A

Source: Audience measurement performed nationwide by Nielsen Korea.

Average TV viewership ratings
Ep.	Original broadcast date	Average audience share	
Ep.	Original broadcast date	(Nielsen Korea)	
Ep.	Original broadcast date	Nationwide	Seoul
1	September 24, 2025	2.179% (3rd)	2.026% (4th)
2	September 25, 2025	1.808% (10th)	1.554% (10th)
3	October 1, 2025	1.942% (5th)	1.767% (5th)
4	October 2, 2025	2.032% (10th)	1.756% (7th)
5	October 8, 2025	1.913% (8th)	—N/a
6	October 9, 2025	1.84% (11th)	—N/a
7	October 15, 2025	1.941% (5th)	1.772% (5th)
8	October 16, 2025	1.922% (10th)	1.960% (8th)
9	October 22, 2025	1.584% (8th)	1.326% (7th)
10	October 23, 2025	1.7% (10th)	—N/a
11	October 29, 2025	1.904% (5th)	1.956% (4th)
12	October 30, 2025	1.61% (11th)	—N/a
Average		_	_
In the table above, the blue numbers represent the lowest ratings and the red numbers represent the highest ratings.; This drama airs on a cable channel/pay TV which normally has a relatively smaller audience compared to free-to-air TV/public broadcasters (KBS, SBS, MBC, and EBS).
