= Kim Eung-soo =

South Korean actor (born 1961)

- Born: February 12, 1961 (age 65); Seocheon County, South Chungcheong Province, South Korea
- Education: Seoul Institute of the Arts - Theater and Film; Japan Institute of the Moving Image - Filmmaking
- Occupation: Actor
- Years active: 1996–present
- Agent: Knock Entertainment
- Spouse: Kim Han-young
- Children: Kim Eun-ah; Kim Eun-seo

Korean name
- Hangul: 김응수
- Hanja: 金應洙
- RR: Gim Eungsu
- MR: Kim Ŭngsu

Kim Eung-soo (Korean: 김응수; born February 12, 1961) is a South Korean actor. Kim lived in Japan for seven years, where he studied filmmaking at the Japan Institute of the Moving Image.

== Filmography ==
Key
†	Denotes films that have not yet been released

=== Film ===
Year	Title	Role	Notes	Ref.
1996	Final Blow		also credited as assistant director	
1998	Two Cops 3	Underling 2		
1998	Girls' Night Out	Man at Kkeopdaegi House		
1999	Phantom: The Submarine	Chan-seok's father		
1999	Attack the Gas Station	Police officer 1		
2000	Pisces	Boss Bae		
2001	Tears	Man into underage prostitution		
2001	Kick the Moon	Gil-nam's henchman 1		
2001	Volcano High	Teacher who throws the chalk		
2002	2009: Lost Memories	Miura		
2002	Fun Movie	Watanabe		
2002	Chi-hwa-seon	Jo Byeong-gap		
2002	Family	Officiant	also credited as line producer	
2002	Jail Breakers	Congressman from the ruling party		
2003	My Teacher, Mr. Kim	Nam-ok's father		
2003	A Good Lawyer's Wife	Yang Taek-sik		
2003	My Daddy (short film)			
2004	Au Revoir, UFO	Landlord		
2004	Temptation of Wolves	Male teacher		
2004	Ghost House	Real estate agent		
2004	Lovely Rivals	Vice principal		
2005	The President's Last Bang	Colonel Min		
2005	The Twins	Jung Min-gook		
2005	Heaven's Soldiers	North Korean general		
2005	Never to Lose	Joo Jin-seok (cameo)		
2005	Wedding Campaign	Village elder		
2005	Blue Swallow	Park Choon-sik		
2006	Art of Fighting	Byeong-ho/Byeong-ho's father		
2006	My Boss, My Teacher	Congressman Choi		
2006	Hanbando	Japanese ambassador Ooyama		
2006	To Sir, with Love	Detective Ma		
2006	No Mercy for the Rude	Director		
2006	Marrying the Mafia III	Director Kim (cameo)		
2006	Tazza: The High Rollers	Kwak Cheol-yong		
2006	Educating Kidnappers	Chief investigator		
2007	The Old Garden	Eung-soo		
2007	Beautiful Sunday	Criminal unit chief		
2007	Small Town Rivals	Mr. Kim		
2007	Pacchigi! Love & Peace		Japanese film	
2007	Hwang Jin Yi	Seo Gyung-deok		
2007	Epitaph	Major Akiyama		
2008	Once Upon a Time	Chief of State		
2008	Dance of the Dragon	Kwon Tae-san's father	Singaporean film	
2008	Ride Away	Im Ha-jung's father		
2009	Private Eye	Yoshioka		
2009	Where Are You Going?	Wan-bae's father		
2010	Cafe Seoul	Dong-choon		
2010	Lady Daddy	Ji-hyeon's father		
2010	Happy Killers	Team leader		
2010	Man of Vendetta	Hospital chief Kim (cameo)		
2010	Tooku no Sora	Yoo Jung-bae	Japanese film	
2011	Meet the In-Laws	Se-dong		
2011	Couples	Chairman Kim (cameo)		
2012	Unbowed	Judge Park Bong-joo		
2012	Nameless Gangster: Rules of the Time	Prosecutor Choi Joo-dong (cameo)		
2012	Gabi	Miura		
2012	As One	Jo Nam-poong		
2012	The Taste of Money	President 1 (cameo)		
2012	I Am a King	Elder at butcher's shop (cameo)		
2012	Gaiji Keisatsu	Park Jong-sik	Japanese film	
2012	The Tower	Chairman Jin (cameo)		
2013	Mr. Go	Jin Yoon-tae, KBO commissioner		
2014	Man on High Heels	Squad leader Park		
2015	Enemies In-Law	Park Man-choon		
2015	Intimate Enemies	In-soo		
2015	Veteran	Adviser Jeong (cameo)		
2019	By Quantum Physics: A Nightlife Venture	Jung Kap-Taek		
2021	A Different Girl		Special appearance	
2027	Typhoon †	Hyun-deok		

=== Television series ===
Year	Title	Role	Ref.
1996	West Palace		
2003	Wedding Gift	Jung-kyun	
2006	Thank You, My Life	Father Kong	
2006	The Snow Queen	Lee Dong-sul	
2007	Conspiracy in the Court	Park In-bin	
2007	Drama City "What is a Prestigious University?"	Byun Kang-soi	
2008	The Great King, Sejong	Min Moo-goo	
2008	You Stole My Heart	Director Jo	
2008	Painter of the Wind	Jang Byuk-soo	
2008	Lottery Trio	Baek Doo-shik	
2009	Splendor of Youth	Yang Dae-doo	
2010	The Slave Hunters	Lee Gyeong-sik	
2010	Becoming a Billionaire	Bu Gwi-ho	
2010	Bad Guy	Neighborhood association president Kwak	
2010	Freedom Fighter, Lee Hoe-young	Captain Mitsuwa/Kim Pan-chul	
2010	The Fugitive: Plan B	Yang Young-joon	
2010	Joseon X-Files	(guest, episode 8)	
2010	The King of Legend	Jobul	
2011	Sign	Chief prosecutor Choi Jung-seop	
2011	Midas	Public administrator Choi	
2011	Warrior Baek Dong-soo	Yoo So-kang	
2011	The Great Gift	Kim Jung-min	
2011	Deep Rooted Tree	Gi Je-yeon	
2011	Vampire Prosecutor	Yoo Won-kook	
2011	Drama Special Series "For My Son"	NIS agent	
2012	History of a Salaryman	Oh Ji-rak	
2012	Moon Embracing the Sun	Yoon Dae-hyung	
2012	Dr. Jin	Minister Kim Byung-hee	
2012	Bridal Mask	Konno Goji	
2013	The Queen of Office	Hwang Gab-deuk	
2013	Basketball	Choi Je-gook	
2014	Cunning Single Lady	Na Gab-soo	
2014	Flower Grandpa Investigation Unit	Kim Young-chul	
2014	Gunman in Joseon	Yamamoto	
2014	Love & Secret	Chun Do-hyung	
2014	Punch	Jung Gook-hyun	
2015	Sweet, Savage Family	Baek Man-bo	
2016	Flowers of the Prison	Jeonokseo's housewife	
2016	Squad 38	Jo Sang-jin	
2016	Imjin War 1592	Hideyoshi Toyotomi	
2017	Introverted Boss	Eun Hwan-ki's father	
2017	Good Manager	Bae Deok-po (guest)	
2017	School 2017	Yang Do-jin	
2017	Because This Is My First Life	Nam Hee-bong	
2018	Mr. Sunshine	Kim Hee-sung's grandfather	
2018	Lovely Horribly	Fortune teller	
2018	Lady Cha Dal-rae's Lover		
2019	Chief of Staff	Jang Choon-bae	
2019	Miss Lee	Oh Man-bok	
2020	Kkondae Intern	Lee Man-sik	
2020	Delayed Justice	Kang Cheol-woo	
2021	Love (ft. Marriage and Divorce)	Pan Moon-ho	
2021	Delivery	Kim Teug-chul	
2025	Good Boy	Jo Pan-yeol	

=== Variety show ===
Year	Title	Notes/Ref.
2012	Come to Play	Panelist
	Star Junior Show	
2022	Oh Eun-Young Report - Southern Couple	Host

=== Web shows ===
Year	Title	Role	Ref.
2021	Eungsu CINE	Host	
2021	Ng Site	Host	

=== Music video appearances ===
Year	Song title	Artist	Ref.
2022	"Like a Gentleman" (신사답게)	Young Tak	

== Theater ==
Year	Title	Role
2008	왕궁식당의 최후	
2010	Namhansanseong	Choi Myung-kil
2012-2013	Bring Me My Chariot of Fire	
2013	이제는 애처가	Hara Bunta
2014	Grass 2	Jeon Bongjun

== Ambassadorship ==
- Honorary Military of Muju (2022)

== Awards and nominations ==
Year	Award	Category	Nominated work	Result
2008	20th Korean Culture and Entertainment Awards	Excellence Award, Actor	Bridal Mask	Won
2012	MBC Drama Awards	Golden Acting Award, Actor	Moon Embracing the Sun, Dr. Jin	Nominated
2016	29th Grimae Awards	Best Actor	The Imjin War 1592	Won
2018	KBS Drama Awards	Excellence Award, Actor in a Daily Drama	Lady Cha Dal-rae's Lover	Nominated
2020	MBC Drama Awards	Top Excellence Award, Actor in a Wednesday-Thursday Miniseries	Kkondae Intern	Won
2020	MBC Drama Awards	Best Couple Award with Park Hae-jin	Kkondae Intern	Nominated
