= 8th Korea Drama Awards =

2015 edition of award ceremony

- Date: October 9, 2015
- Site: Gyeongnam Culture and Art Center, Jinju, South Gyeongsang Province
- Hosted by: Choi Soo-young; Oh Sang-jin

The 8th Korea Drama Awards is an awards ceremony for excellence in television in South Korea. It was held at the Gyeongnam Culture and Art Center in Jinju, South Gyeongsang Province on October 9, 2015. The nominees were chosen from Korean dramas that aired from October 2014 to September 2015.

== Nominations and winners ==
(Winners denoted in bold)

Grand Prize (Daesang)	Best Drama
**Kim Soo-hyun** - **The Producers**; Cha Seung-won - Splendid Politics; Ji Sung - Kill Me, Heal Me; Joo Won - Yong-pal; Yoo Dong-geun - What Happens to My Family?	**Misaeng: Incomplete Life (tvN)**; Heard It Through the Grapevine (SBS); Kill Me, Heal Me (MBC); The Producers (KBS2); Yong-pal (SBS)
Best Production Director	Best Screenplay
**Seo Soo-min, Pyo Min-soo** - **The Producers**; Ahn Pan-seok - Heard It Through the Grapevine; Jo Hyun-tak - More Than a Maid; Kim Jin-man - Kill Me, Heal Me; Kim Won-seok - Misaeng: Incomplete Life	**Jang Hyuk-rin** - **Yong-pal**; Jo Hyun-kyung - More Than a Maid; Jung Yoon-jung - Misaeng: Incomplete Life; Kim Woon-kyung - Steal Heart; Kwon Ki-young - Hello Monster
Top Excellence Award, Actor	Top Excellence Award, Actress
**Lee Jong-suk** - **Pinocchio**; Park Hae-jin - Bad Guys; Park Yoo-chun - A Girl Who Sees Smells; Im Si-wan - Misaeng: Incomplete Life; Yoo Jun-sang - Heard It Through the Grapevine	**Kim Tae-hee** - **Yong-pal**; Hwang Jung-eum - Kill Me, Heal Me; Jang Na-ra - Hello Monster; Kim Hee-sun - Angry Mom; Park Shin-hye - Pinocchio
Excellence Award, Actor	Excellence Award, Actress
**Kim Dae-myung** - **Misaeng: Incomplete Life**; **Lee Joon** - **Heard It Through the Grapevine**; Jo Jung-suk - Oh My Ghost; Seo In-guk - Hello Monster; Seo Kang-joon - Splendid Politics	**Choi Soo-young** - **My Spring Days**; IU - The Producers; Kim Sa-rang - This is My Love; Seo Hyun-jin - Let's Eat 2; Uee - High Society
Best New Actor	Best New Actress
**Park Chanyeol** - **Exo Next Door**; Nam Joo-hyuk - Who Are You: School 2015; Nam Tae-hyun - Late Night Restaurant; Seo Young-joo - Snowy Road; Yook Sungjae - Who Are You: School 2015	**Lim Ji-yeon** - **High Society**; Chae Soo-bin - House of Bluebird; Cho Soo-hyang - Who Are You: School 2015; Kim Seolhyun - Orange Marmalade; Lee Sung-kyung - Flower of Queen
Best Original Soundtrack	Special Jury Prize
**"Auditory Hallucination" (Jang Jae-in)** - **Kill Me, Heal Me**	**Im Si-wan** - **Misaeng: Incomplete Life**
Hallyu Star Award	KDA Award
**Kim Soo-hyun** - **The Producers**; **Park Chanyeol** - **Exo Next Door**	**Park Hae-jin** - **Bad Guys**
Hot Star Award	Star of the Year Award
**Seo Kang-joon** - **Splendid Politics**	**Kim So-hyun** - **Who Are You: School 2015**
Global Star Award	Lifetime Achievement Award
**Sam Okyere** - **Warm and Cozy**	**Kim Young-ae**
