= Josee, the Tiger and the Fish =

1984 Japanese short story

- Cover of the Japanese edition
- Author: Seiko Tanabe
- Original title: ジョゼと虎と魚たち (Joze to Tora to Sakanatachi)
- Language: Japanese
- Genre: Romance
- Publisher: Monthly Kadokawa (short story); Kadokawa Shoten (short story collection)
- Publication date: June 1984 (short story); March 27, 1985 (short story collection)
- Publication place: Japan
- Pages: 228 pp (short story collection)
- ISBN: 978-4-04-872409-8

Josee, the Tiger and the Fish (Japanese: ジョゼと虎と魚たち, Hepburn: Joze to Tora to Sakanatachi) is a 1984 Japanese short story by author Seiko Tanabe. It was first published in the June 1984 issue of Monthly Kadokawa. It was later included alongside various stories in the short story collection of the same name, which was published on March 27, 1985, by Kadokawa Shoten. Yen Press licensed the collection for an English release and published it in March 2022. A manga adaptation of the short story by Nao Emoto, originally serialized in Da Vinci from February to November 2020 issues and collected into two volumes, was also licensed by Yen Press and released in September 2022 in one volume.

== Film adaptations ==
- Josee, the Tiger and the Fish, a 2003 Japanese live-action film
- Josée, a 2020 South Korean live-action film, based in part on the screenplay of the 2003 film
- Josee, the Tiger and the Fish, a 2020 Japanese animated film
