= Jeong Moon-ho =

South Korean firefighter

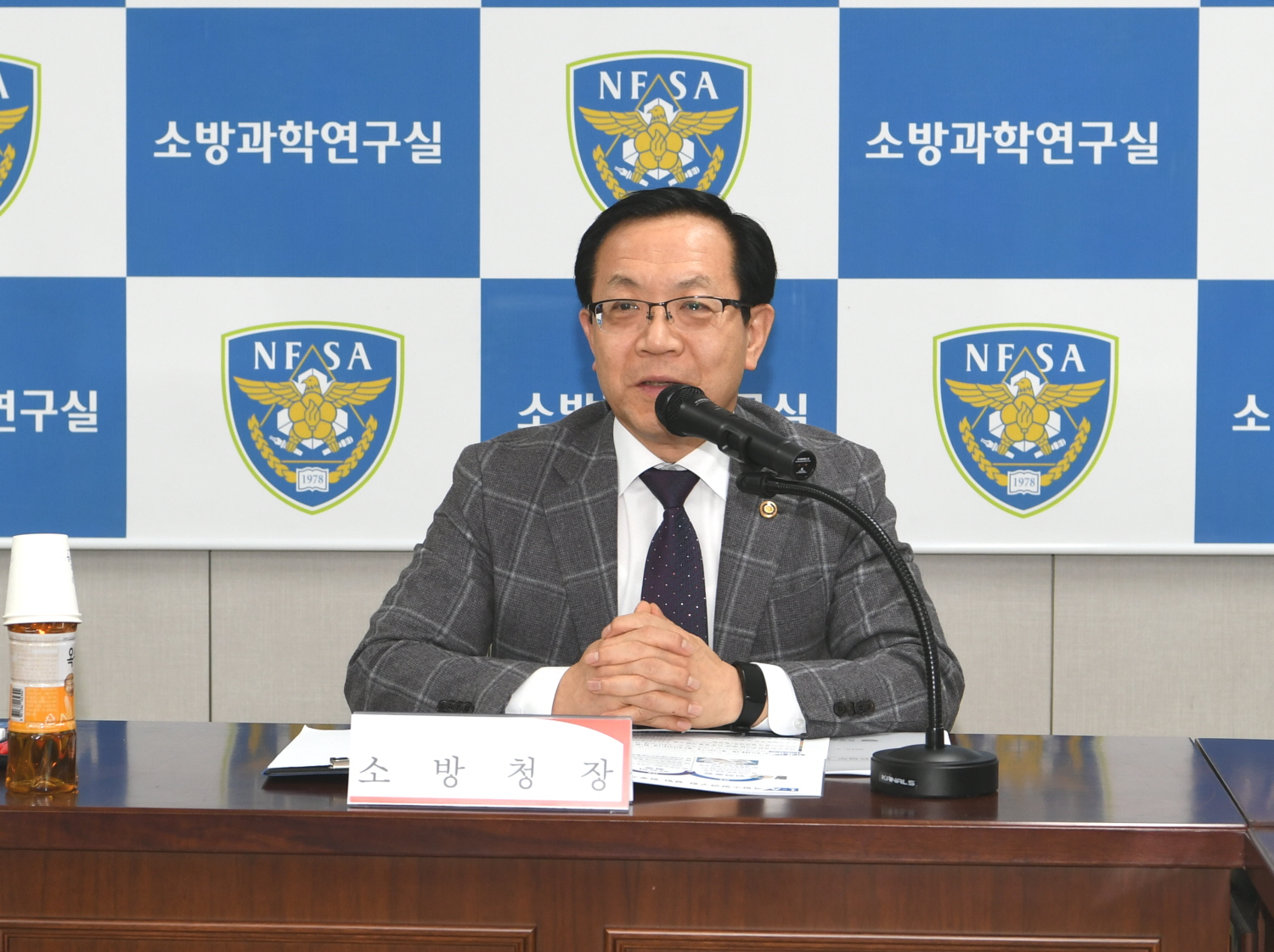
National Fire Research Agency, 2019

Jeong Moon-ho (Korean: 정문호; Hanja: 鄭文鎬; born February 7, 1962) is a South Korea firefighter. He was born in Nonsan, Chungcheongnam-do and appointed as Fire Captain in 1990 finishing the 6th class of the Fire Cadet. He served as Fire Commissioner of National Fire Agency, Seoul Metropolitan Fire and Disaster Management Headquarters.

== Education ==
- 2001 Master in Safety Engineering, Hoseo University, Asan, South Korea
- 1985 Bachelor in Chemistry, Chungnam National University, Daejeon, South Korea

== Career ==
- 2018. 12. 15 ~ Commissioner of the National Fire Agency
- 2017 Commissioner of the Seoul Metropolitan Fire & Disaster Headquarters
- 2014 Commissioner of the Incheon Fire Headquarters
- 2014 Secondment to the Korea National Defense University
- 2012 Commissioner of the Chungnam Fire Headquarters
- 2009 Fire Policies Division, National Emergency Management Agency
- 2008 Fire Chief of the Gongju Fire Station, Chungnam Province
- 2004 Fire Chief of the Asan Fire Station, Chungnam Province

== Awards ==
- 2015 Order of Service Merit (Order of Okjogeunjeong)
- 2007 Presidential Citation
