= Cheese in the Trap (TV series) =

2016 South Korean television series

- Promotional poster
- Hangul: 치즈인더트랩
- RR: Chijeu in deo teuraep
- MR: Ch'ijŭ in tŏ t'ŭraep
- Genre: Romance; Drama
- Based on: Cheese in the Trap by Soonkki
- Written by: Kim Nam-hee; Go Sun-hee
- Directed by: Lee Yoon-jung
- Starring: Park Hae-jin; Kim Go-eun; Seo Kang-joon; Lee Sung-kyung; Nam Joo-hyuk; Park Min-ji
- Country of origin: South Korea
- Original language: Korean
- No. of episodes: 16

Production
- Executive producers: Park Ho-sik; Kang Hoon; Kim Won-ju; Yang Hwan-chul
- Producers: Kim Keo-hong; Jung Se-ryung
- Production companies: Eight Works; Kross Pictures; PGood Media

Original release
- Network: tvN
- Release: 4 January – 1 March 2016

Cheese in the Trap (Korean: 치즈인더트랩) is a South Korean television series adapted from a webtoon starring Park Hae-jin, Kim Go-eun, Seo Kang-joon, Lee Sung-kyung, Nam Joo-hyuk, and Park Min-ji. It aired on the cable network tvN on Mondays and Tuesdays for 16 episodes from 4 January to 1 March 2016. The series is based on the webtoon of the same name, serialized on Naver Webtoon from 2010 to 2016, although it featured an original ending since the webtoon had not been completed at the time of filming.

== Synopsis ==
The drama focuses on the life and relationships of a group of university students, particularly the difficult relationship between hard-working scholarship student Hong Seol (Kim Go-eun) and a deceptive senior, Yoo Jung (Park Hae-jin).

Jung is rich, popular, and he is heir to Taerang Group. Although he appears to be nice and kind to everyone around him, he is quite manipulative with a penchant for destroying those who irritate him, often by using others. When Seol discovers this, her life starts becoming so miserable she decides to take time off school. When she returns through a scholarship that was intended for Jung, he is unexpectedly nice to her and he asks her on a date. Although she is unsure what kind of person he is, they begin an awkward relationship complicated by the distance between them as well as the aftermath of his various schemes. The situation is further complicated by the arrival of Baek In-ho and his sister In-ha, childhood friends of Jung who have since had a falling out.

== Cast ==
=== Main ===
- Park Hae-jin as Yoo Jung, Seol's senior. He is handsome, intelligent and successful, but secretly harbors a dark side to his personality. He is sometimes cold or manipulative, and has trouble forming relationships with others because of his uncertainty that they are not using him for his money. However, he is attracted to Seol.
- Kim Go-eun as Hong Seol, a beautiful and hardworking college student who struggles to figure out Yoo Jung's true intentions, but sees an innocent side in him against the advice of his childhood friend Baek In-ho.
- Seo Kang-joon as Baek In-ho, a handsome and talented pianist who is adopted into Jung's wealthy family by his father. He and his sister came from a difficult background, but he finds it easy to get along with Seol, later developing feelings for her. He and Jung were friends as children, although they later develop a bitter rivalry as he believes that Jung was responsible for instigating a fight that damaged his hand, ending his dreams of becoming a concert pianist.
- Lee Sung-kyung as Baek In-ha, In-ho's beautiful, melodramatic and materialistic older sister. She was also adopted into Jung's family as a child, and is in love with Jung, although he does not reciprocate her feelings.
- Nam Joo-hyuk as Kwon Eun-taek, Seol and Bo-ra's loyal friend, who is in love with Jang Bo-ra.
- Park Min-ji as Jang Bo-ra, Seol's supportive best friend.

=== Supporting ===
==== Hong family ====
- Kim Hee-chan as Hong Joon, Seol's younger brother who returns to Korea from the United States.
- Ahn Gil-kang as Hong Jin-tak, Seol's father.
- Yoon Bok-in as Kim Young-hee, Seol's mother.

==== Yeon-yi university ====
- Ji Yoon-ho as Oh Young-gon, a delinquent who becomes obsessed with Seol after she gave him advice when he was ostracized.
- Yoon Ji-won as Son Min-soo, a shy classmate who gains confidence by copying Seol's identity.
- Moon Ji-yoon as Kim Sang-cheol, a lazy senior in Seol's class that incessantly copies the work of Jae-woo and Seol.
- Kim Hye-ji as Lee Da-young, a girl in Seol's class who dates Young-gon.
- Cha Joo-young as Nam Joo-yeon, a girl who is obsessed with Jung at the beginning of the series.
- Yoon Ye-joo as Kang Ah-young, Seol's junior and Joon's love interest.
- Oh Hee-joon as Ha Jae-woo, a hard working, ill-tempered senior in Seol's class.
- Go Hyun as Kim Kyung-hwan, a senior in Seol's class that's good friends with Jung.
- Shin Joo-hwan as Min Do-hyun, interested in Seol.
- Lee Woo-dong as Heo Yoon-sub, Seol's boss at her university admin job.
- Hwang Seok-jeong as Professor Kang
- Kim Jin-keun as Professor Han

==== Others ====
- Son Byong-ho as Yoo Young-soo, Jung's father.
- Kim Ki-bang as Kong Joo-yong, Seol's neighbour and Yoon-sub's boyfriend.

== Production ==
The role of Hong Seol was first offered to Kim Go-eun, who declined it before accepting it afterwards. The role was also offered to Bae Suzy, but she declined it.

Shooting began in September 2015, and wrapped up filming in January 2016.

== Original soundtrack ==
The soundtrack of "Cheese in the Trap" was released in six parts.

Cheese in the Trap OST Part. 1
| No. | Title | Artist | Length |
|---|---|---|---|
| 1. | "어쩌면 좋아" ("Maybe") | Cosmos Hippie (우주히피) | 3:40 |
| 2. | "치즈인더트랩" ("Cheese in the Trap") | Twenty Years Old (스무살) | 3:54 |
| 3. | "Golden Coconut Club" (Sentimental Scenery Mix) | Tearliner |
| 4. | "우리 소곤소곤" (Sentimental Scenery Mix) | Tearliner |

Cheese in the Trap OST Part. 2
| No. | Title | Artist | Length |
|---|---|---|---|
| 1. | "I Am Love" | Tearliner ft. Yozoh | 2:41 |
| 2. | "Einfühlung" | Tearliner | 2:44 |
| 3. | "고양이와 낮잠" ("Taking a Nap with a Cat") | Tearliner | 1:08 |
| 4. | "따뜻한 겨울라떼" ("Warm Winter Latte") | Tearliner | 2:58 |
| 5. | "오늘도 맑음" ("Today Also Sunny") | Tearliner | 1:24 |

Cheese in the Trap OST Part. 3
| No. | Title | Artist | Length |
|---|---|---|---|
| 1. | "Such" | Kang Hyun-min ft. Jo Hyun-ah of Urban Zakapa | 4.22 |
| 2. | "말 없는 슬픔" ("Silent Sorrow") | 사람또사람 (People and People) | 3.46 |
| 3. | "사랑과 연애 어디쯤" ("Somewhere Between Love and Romance") | Tearliner | 2.05 |
| 4. | "이 길 지나 너" ("Passing This Road, to You") | Tearliner | 1.28 |
| 5. | "삼각김밥 사용법" ("How to Use a Triangle Kimbab") | Tearliner | 1.48 |

Cheese in the Trap OST Part. 4
| No. | Title | Artist | Length |
|---|---|---|---|
| 1. | "너와 나의 시간은" ("Our Time") | Vanilla Acoustic | 3.30 |
| 2. | "너를 채운다. 너를 지운다." ("Fill You. Erase You.") | Tearliner ft. 5urprise | 3.22 |
| 3. | "슈가파우더가 내리면" ("Sugar Powder Is Falling") | Tearliner | 1.26 |
| 4. | "오늘도 지각" ("Today Is Late Too") | 우지해 (Woo Ji Hye) | 1.20 |
| 5. | "그 남자의 꿈" ("That Man's Dream") | Tearliner | 3.11 |

Cheese in the Trap OST Part. 5
| No. | Title | Artist | Length |
|---|---|---|---|
| 1. | "Go (Korean ver.)" | 솔튼페이퍼 (SALTNPAPER) | 3.11 |
| 2. | "그냥 좋은데" ("I Like You") | 테테 (Tété) | 3.46 |
| 3. | "Go (English ver.)" | 솔튼페이퍼 (SALTNPAPER) | 3.11 |
| 4. | "The End Is Near" | Tearliner | 2.53 |
| 5. | "방황하는 파도" (Wandering Wave) | Tearliner | 2.18 |
| 6. | "First Kiss" | 센티멘탈 시너리 (Sentimental Scenery) | 2.22 |

Cheese in the Trap OST Part. 6
| No. | Title | Artist | Length |
|---|---|---|---|
| 1. | "조금만 더" ("A Little Bit More") | 스웨덴세탁소 (Sweden Laundry) | 2.53 |
| 2. | "사랑인가 봐요" ("Maybe It's Love") | Monkeyz | 3.43 |
| 3. | "장화 속 무당벌레" ("Lady Bug in Boots") | Tearliner | 2.20 |
| 4. | "밤의 편의점" ("Convenience Store at Night") | Tearliner | 1.37 |

== Reception ==
Cheese in the Trap was a success in both South Korea and China. It was sold to China for $125,000 per episode, becoming the most expensive cable series. It won praise for its realistic depiction of the life of university students, but was criticized for diverging from the source webtoon by placing undue focus on the second male lead and including an original ending "that was rushed and left many viewers baffled".

== Ratings ==
In this table, the blue numbers represent the lowest ratings and the red numbers represent the highest ratings.

| Ep. | Original broadcast date | Average audience share | |
| Ep. | Original broadcast date | AGB Nielsen | TNmS |
| Ep. | Original broadcast date | Nationwide | Nationwide |
|---|---|---|---|
| 1 | 4 January 2016 | 3.597% | 3.813% |
| 2 | 5 January 2016 | 4.839% | 4.340% |
| 3 | 11 January 2016 | 5.222% | 4.902% |
| 4 | 12 January 2016 | 5.687% | 5.568% |
| 5 | 18 January 2016 | 6.490% | 6.883% |
| 6 | 19 January 2016 | 6.271% | 6.738% |
| 7 | 25 January 2016 | 6.030% | 6.523% |
| 8 | 26 January 2016 | 6.750% | 7.831% |
| 9 | 1 February 2016 | 7.102% | 8.181% |
| 10 | 2 February 2016 | 6.545% | 7.024% |
| 11 | 15 February 2016 | 5.598% | 5.567% |
| 12 | 16 February 2016 | 5.844% | 6.122% |
| 13 | 22 February 2016 | 6.169% | 6.081% |
| 14 | 23 February 2016 | 6.487% | 7.422% |
| 15 | 29 February 2016 | 5.875% | 6.393% |
| 16 | 1 March 2016 | 6.889% | 7.579% |
| Average | | 5.962% | 6.310% |

- This drama airs on a cable channel/pay TV which normally has a relatively smaller audience compared to free-to-air TV/public broadcasters (KBS, SBS, MBC and EBS).

== Awards and nominations ==
| Year | Award | Category | Recipient | Result |
|---|---|---|---|---|
| 2016 | Korean Cable TV Awards 2016 | Best Actor | Park Hae-jin | Won |
| 2016 | 52nd Baeksang Arts Awards | Best New Actress (Television) | Kim Go-eun | Won |
| 2016 | 52nd Baeksang Arts Awards | Most Popular Actor (Television) | Park Hae-jin | Nominated |
| 2016 | 52nd Baeksang Arts Awards | Most Popular Actor (Television) | Seo Kang-joon | Nominated |
| 2016 | 52nd Baeksang Arts Awards | Most Popular Actress (Television) | Kim Go-eun | Nominated |
| 2016 | 52nd Baeksang Arts Awards | Most Popular Actress (Television) | Lee Sung-kyung | Nominated |
| 2016 | 5th APAN Star Awards | Excellence Award, Actor in a Miniseries | Park Hae-jin | Nominated |
| 2016 | 5th APAN Star Awards | Best New Actress | Kim Go-eun | Nominated |
| 2016 | 9th Korea Drama Awards | Excellence Award, Actor | Park Hae-jin | Nominated |
| 2016 | 9th Korea Drama Awards | Best New Actress | Kim Go-eun | Nominated |
| 2016 | tvN10 Awards | Made in tvN, Actor in Drama | Seo Kang-joon | Nominated |
| 2016 | 1st Asia Artist Awards | Best Artist Award, Actor | Park Hae-jin | Won |
| 2016 | 1st Asia Artist Awards | Best Entertainer Award, Actor | Seo Kang-joon | Won |

== Film ==
The series was adapted into a film by the same name, starring Park Hae-jin opposite with actress Oh Yeon-seo, which was released in March 2018.
