= Cheese in the Trap =

2010–2017 South Korean manhwa series

치즈인더트랩 Chijeu in deo teuraep
- Genre: Romance, drama
- Author: Soonkki
- Publisher: (South Korea) Jfun
- English publisher: WEBTOON
- Magazine: Naver WEBTOON
- Original run: 2010–2017
- Collected volumes: 15

Cheese in the Trap (Korean: 치즈인더트랩) is a South Korean manhwa series written and illustrated by Soonkki. The webtoon was released on Internet portal Naver WEBTOON since 2010, and the first volume in print was published on March 2, 2012. It was adapted into a television series of the same name, which started airing on January 4, 2016. A film of the same name was also released on March 14, 2018.

== Plot summary ==
Model student Hong Seol returns to college from a long break and finds herself caught up with Yoo Jung, a senior who's also known as Mr. Perfect. Seol feels like her life has taken a turn for the worse since Jung came into her life. The story alternates between the present day and the past events leading up to Seol's decision to take time off of school. Seol is a studious and hard-working overachiever who comes from a low-income background and has to work part-time to make ends meet. Jung is the rich heir to Taerang Group and is seemingly perfect; he is seen as nice and kind by almost all of his peers, but behind the scenes, he manipulates and destroys people who irritate him. When Seol first meets Jung, she feels there is something malicious lurking beneath the surface; her encounters with him are ominous, and she feels he is looking down on her. Seol begins to experience more problems with her classmates because of Jung, and eventually decides to take a break. In the present day, when she returns to college, Jung starts paying more attention to Seol and asks her out on a date. Although she isn't sure what kind of person he is, they begin an awkward relationship that is complicated by the distance between them as well as the aftermath of his various schemes. The situation becomes more complex with the arrival of In-ho Baek and his sister In-ha Baek, childhood friends of Jung who have since had a falling out.

== Media ==
In Japan, the webtoon was published into physical books by Kadokawa with the characters' names and nationalities changed to Japanese. To promote the Japanese release of volumes 7 and 8, a preview was released on YouTube with Aoi Yuki voicing Yuki Akayama (Hong Seol) and Yoshimasa Hosoya voicing Jun Aota (Yoo Jung).
