= Seiko Tanabe =

Japanese novelist, translator, and literary critic (1928–2019)

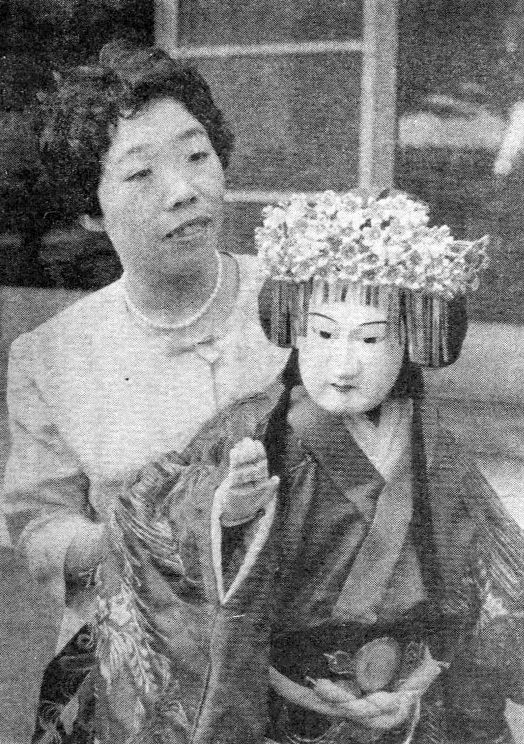
- Tanabe in 1966
- Born: 田邉聖子; March 27, 1928; Osaka, Empire of Japan
- Died: June 6, 2019 (aged 91); Kōbe, Japan
- Occupations: Writer, translator, critic
- Spouse: Sumio Kawano (m. 1966)
- Writing career
- Notable works: Kanshō ryokō (1964); Uba-zakari (1981); Hinekure Issa (1993); Dōton-bori no ame ni wakarete inainari - Senryū sakka Kishimoto Suifu to sono jidai (1993)
- Notable awards: Akutagawa Prize (1964); Order of Culture (2008)

Seiko Tanabe (田辺 聖子, Tanabe Seiko; 27 March 1928 – 6 June 2019) was a Japanese author. She graduated from the Department of Japanese Literature of Shōin Joshi Senmon Gakkō (now Osaka Shoin Women's University). Author of numerous novels, she won the Akutagawa Prize, Yomiuri Prize, and Asahi Prize, and received the Order of Culture for her contributions to literature. She was nicknamed the "L. M. Montgomery of Japan” after her death in 2019.

== Biography ==
Tanabe was born on 27 March 1928. Her father was a photographer and owned a photography studio. She was familiar with Japanese classic literature since her young days. The culture and traditions of her birthplace, Osaka, largely affected her life and writings.

After World War II, she engaged in literary activities while working for a company. Her novel Hanagari (花狩), written during this period, was shortlisted for a literary competition and made into a radio drama. In 1956, she won the Osaka Citizen Award for literature for her story Niji (虹). After that she became a professional writer.

In 1964, she won the 50th Akutagawa Prize for her novel Sentimental Journey (感傷旅行, Kanshō Ryokō). In the following years, she wrote and published a wide range of literary works, such as romantic novels, biographies, essays on various themes, including Japanese classic literature, translations and adaptations of the classic works of Japan, such as the Tale of Genji and Makura no Sōshi.

She married Sumio Kawano (川野純夫), who had been the husband of her literary friend Shōko Kawano (川野彰子). After the death of Shōko, Tanabe married Kawano in 1966, and lived with him until his death in 2002, for 36 years. They lived first in Osaka, but in 1976, they moved to Itami, in Hyōgo Prefecture.

Tanabe received various literary awards. In 2000, she became a Person of Cultural Merit and then, she received the Order of Culture for her literary contributions to Japanese culture in 2008. Her literary works had unique characteristics which reflected the culture of Osaka and its dialect. She created successful love romances using the Osaka dialect, which is one of the Kansai dialects.

Tanabe died of ascending cholangitis on 6 June 2019 at a hospital in Kōbe, Hyōgo.

== Prizes ==
- 1956 Osaka Citizen Award, for Niji ( 虹 )
- 1964 50th Akutagawa Prize for Kanshō ryokō ( 感傷旅行 )
- 1987 Women's Literature Award for Hanagoromo nuguya matsuwaru ... Waga ai no Sugita Hisajo ( 花衣ぬぐやまつわる......わが愛の杉田久女 )
- 1993 Yoshikawa Eiji Prize for Literature, for Hinekure Issa ( ひねくれ一茶 )
- 1994 42nd Kikuchi Kan Prize, for Hinekure Issa
- 1998 26th Izumi Kyōka Prize for Literature, for Dōton-bori no ame ni wakarete irai nari - Senryū sakka Kishimoto Suifu to sono jidai ( 道頓堀の雨に別れて以来なり-川柳作家·岸本水府とその時代 )
- 1999 50th Yomiuri Prize for Dōton-bori no ame ni wakarete irai nari
- 2007 Asahi Prize

== Awards ==
- 2000 Person of Cultural Merit
- 2008 Order of Culture

== Selected works ==
=== Novels ===
- Hanakari (花狩) Touto shobou 1958
- Kanshou ryokou (Sentimental journey) (感傷旅行（センチメンタル・ジャーニィ）) Bungeishunjū, 1964
- Amai kankei (甘い関係) San-ichi Publishing, 1968
- Onna no hidokei (女の日時計) Yomiuri Shimbun, 1970
- Joze to tora to sakana-tachi (ジョゼと虎と魚たち) Kadokawa Shoten 1985
- Fukigenna koibito (不機嫌な恋人) Kadokawa Shoten, 1988
- Hinekure Issa (ひねくれ一茶) Kodansha, 1992

=== Essays ===
- Onna no nagaburo (女の長風呂) Bungeishunjū, 1973
- Eve no okurege (イブのおくれ毛) Bungeishunjū, 1975
- Raamen nieta mo gozonjinai (ラーメン煮えたもご存じない) Shinchosha, 1977
- Rakurōshō 1, 2, 3, 4 (楽老抄) Shueisha, 1999, 2007, 2008, 2009

=== Translations and adaptations of classic Japanese works ===
- Mae mae, katatsumuri, Shin Ochikubo monogatari (舞え舞え蝸牛 新・落窪物語) Bungeishunjū, 1977
- Shin Genji monogatari (新源氏物語) Shinchosha, 1978–79
- Shihon Genji monogatari (私本・源氏物語) Jitsugyo no Nihon Sha, 1980
- Haru no mezame wa Murasaki no maki, Shin shihon Genji monogatari (春のめざめは紫の巻 新・私本源氏物語) Jitsugyo no Nihon Sha, 1983
- Mukashi akebono, shousetsu Makura no sōshi (むかし・あけぼの 小説枕草子) Kadokawa Shoten, 1983
- Tanabe Seiko no Ogura hyakunin isshu (田辺聖子の小倉百人一首) Kadokawa Shoten, 1986
- Tanabe Seiko no Kojiki (田辺聖子の古事記) Shueisha, Watashi no koten 1986
- Kiri fukaki Uji no koi, Shin Genji monogatari (霧ふかき宇治の恋 新源氏物語) Shinchosha, 1990

=== Biographies ===
- Hanagoromo nuguya matsuwaru ... Waga ai no Sugita Hisajo (花衣ぬぐやまつわる……わが愛の杉田久女) Shueisha, 1987
- Douton-bori no ame ni wakarete irai nari - Senryuu sakka Kishimoto Suifu to sono jidai (道頓堀の雨に別れて以来なり――川柳作家・岸本水府とその時代) Chuokoron-Shinsha, 1998
