= Nam Ji-hyun (disambiguation) =

- Hangul: 남지현
- RR: Nam Jihyeon
- MR: Nam Chihyŏn

Nam Ji-hyun may refer to:

- Nam Ji-hyun (actress, born 1990) (born 1990), birth name of actress and former 4Minute member
- Nam Ji-hyun (actress) (born 1995)
