= Park Gyu-young =

South Korean actress (born 1993)

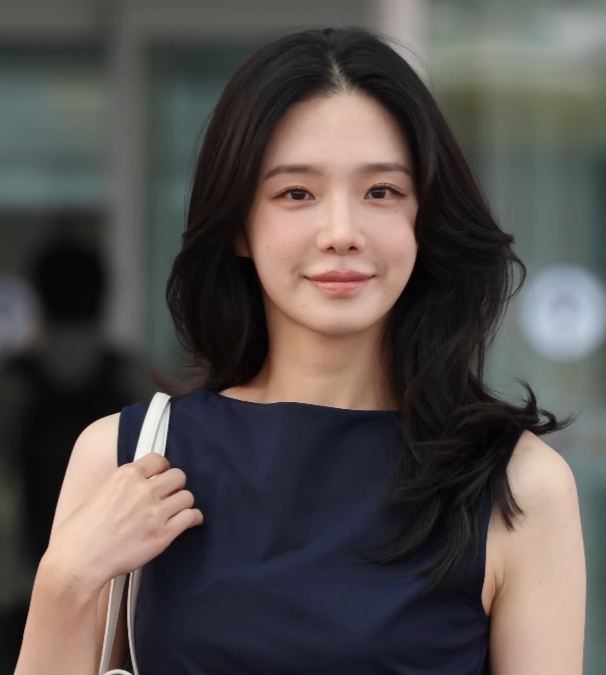
- Park in June 2026
- Born: July 27, 1993 (age 33); Busan, South Korea
- Education: Yonsei University (Department of Clothing and Environment)
- Occupation: Actress
- Years active: 2016–present
- Agent: Saram Entertainment
- Height: 169 cm (5 ft 7 in)

Korean name
- Hangul: 박규영
- Hanja: 朴圭瑛
- RR: Bak Gyuyeong
- MR: Pak Kyuyŏng
- Website: esaram.co.kr

Park Gyu-young (Korean: 박규영; born July 27, 1993) is a South Korean actress and model. She is best known for her roles in the Netflix series Sweet Home (2020), for which she was nominated for Best New Actress, and season 2 and 3 of Squid Game (2024–2025).

She made her debut in the music video "Crosswalk" in 2016, and subsequently took on mostly supporting roles. Following a second lead role in the International Emmy-nominated drama It's Okay to Not Be Okay (2020), she transitioned to leading roles in Dali & Cocky Prince (2021), Celebrity (2023), and A Good Day to Be a Dog (2023).

== Early life and education ==
Park Gyu-young was born on July 27, 1993, in Busan. She attended Busan Foreign Language High School. Park left her hometown of Busan and began living in Seoul in 2013 when she entered Yonsei University's Department of Clothing and Environment. She graduated in 2020.

== Career ==
=== Beginning ===
Park began training to become an actor after she was discovered by JYP Entertainment in 2015, after they saw her on the cover of a college magazine called University Tomorrow. She made her acting debut in Jo Kwon's music video "Crosswalk" in 2016. From 2016 to 2018, she played supporting roles in television dramas including Solomon's Perjury, Rain or Shine, and The Third Charm; as well as in the web dramas Magic School and Miss Independent Jieun.

In 2018, Park made her debut as main protagonist in Kim Baek-joon's film Wretches, where she played the dual roles of Ye-ri, an innocent girl with an intellectual disability, and Bo-kyung. That same year, she also appeared in Kim Dae-woong's film Love+Sling, playing So-young, the eldest daughter of a family that lives upstairs from former wrestlers Gwi-bo (Yoo Hae-jin) and Seong-woong (Kim Min-jae). Her character was described as "a free-spirited, playful, hippie-like character." Park's versatile performances in both films led to her being named a rising star by Cine21.

In 2019, Park appeared in the television dramas Romance Is a Bonus Book and Nokdu Flower in supporting roles. In August of the same year, she left JYP Entertainment and signed with Saram Entertainment.

=== Breakthrough roles ===
In 2020, she landed her first main role in a television series in the tvN drama It's Okay to Not Be Okay, starring Kim Soo-hyun and Seo Yea-ji. The New York Times named the show one of "The Best International Shows of 2020" and it received a nomination for Best TV Movie or Miniseries at the 49th International Emmy Awards in the Best TV Movie or Miniseries categories.

That same year, Park was cast in the Netflix series Sweet Home as Yoon Ji-su, a troubled bass guitarist who moves into Green Home after her boyfriend's suicide. A skilled survivor, her character wields a baseball bat and also plays the acoustic guitar. She reprised her role for seasons two and three. Later, Park admitted she did not have high expectations of being cast, but recalled, "as soon as [she] left the audition set, the director called [her] and said to leave with a script." Park and her fellow actresses were praised for breaking stereotypes of female characters. For her performance, she earned a nomination for Best New Actress – Television in 57th Baeksang Arts Awards.

=== Transitioning to leading roles and Squid Games ===
In 2021, Park starred as Yoon Soo-hyun, a police detective and childhood friend of Kim Ga-on (Park Jin-young), in the mystery legal drama The Devil Judge. Later that year, she took on her first leading role in a terrestrial drama, Dali & Cocky Prince. She portrayed Kim Da-li, a visiting researcher at the Saint Müller Museum who eventually becomes the director of the Cheong-song Art Museum. Dali is knowledgeable in many areas, speaks seven languages fluently, and has a pleasant personality, but she struggles with household tasks, including cooking. It aired on KBS2 from September 22 to November 11, 2021.

In 2023, she starred in the Netflix original series Celebrity. She acted as Seo Ah-ri, a humble door-to-door make-up saleswoman who finds herself thrown into a life of fame, wealth, and desire as she explores the world of social media influencers. The same year she also starred in the series A Good Day to Be a Dog alongside Cha Eun-woo, based on a Naver webtoon of the same name by Lee Hye. Park acted as Han Hae-na/Mak-soon, a high school Korean language teacher who turns into a dog when she kisses someone for the first time.

In 2024, it was announced that Park had been cast in the Netflix series Squid Game season 2 and season 3. Production for the second season began in July 2023 and it was released on December 26, 2024. The third and final season was filmed back-to-back with the second season and was released on June 27, 2025. She plays Kang No-eul, a North Korean sniper whom director Hwang Dong-hyuk described as having "no reason left to live." To prepare for the role, she worked hard on the emotional acting requested by director Hwang and trained to embody the physicality of a soldier. The role further expanded her international prominence. The July 2025 Luxury Issue of Elle India featured Park as the first Korean actress to appear on the print cover.

Park stars as Shin Jae-yi, a former training partner and rival to Mantis, in the 2025 Netflix action thriller film Mantis. Directed by Lee Tae-sung, the film is a spin-off of Kill Boksoon and features Park alongside Yim Si-wan and Jo Woo-jin. The film was released on September 26, 2025 on Netflix. Park's upcoming project also includes the crime mystery series Unfriend, which is slated to premiere as a TVING original. Filmed in 2023, the series, co-starring Kim Seon-ho, was held for a 2026 launch. Co-directed by Kim Jee-woon and Park Bo-ram, the project is a joint production by Yong Film, Anthology Studio, and SK Global Entertainment, adapting Chan Ho-kei's crime novel Second Sister.

== Endorsements ==
Park's career in advertising began in 2016 with commercials for 11th Street, Ajinomoto's Bono Soup, and Korea Yakult's Super 100. In 2017, she continued to work with major brands, including I'M MEME, The Face Shop, and Korea Shiseido, and in 2018, she endorsed Sameson.

Following her breakthrough acting roles, her advertising portfolio grew significantly. From 2019 to 2021, she had campaigns for SK Planet's OK Cashbag, Dongseo Food, and fashion brands like Just Wonder. In 2021, also collaborated with 100LABS, Polham, National Geographic, and Carrier air conditioner. she continued her partnership with Carrier and also became a muse for Clio's Goodall skincare and the face of MINE Beauty.

In 2023, Park's partnerships continued with LG Electronics, and in September, she was named the first muse of fashion brand Satur. The following month, she was appointed a global ambassador for Gucci, having previously attended the Gucci Ancora Spring 2024 show as a guest, which was under new creative director Sabato De Sarno. Her ongoing deals with Skinny Lab and Recipe Group also began in 2023. In March 2024, she was appointed a global ambassador for AHC. She also became the face of Emface in December. In 2025, she was featured in campaigns for BTIL Korea and Calvin Klein underwear.

== Personal life ==
Having attended Busan Foreign Language High School, Park is fluent in English. She has also spoken about creating her own routine to maintain balance as an actress. Park stated, "I focus on my character while acting, but I also think of it as a routine to quickly return to myself on my off days." She added that regardless of her schedule, she has established her own routines, such as going to ballet twice a week or the gym three times a week.

== Filmography ==
Key
†	Denotes films that have not yet been released

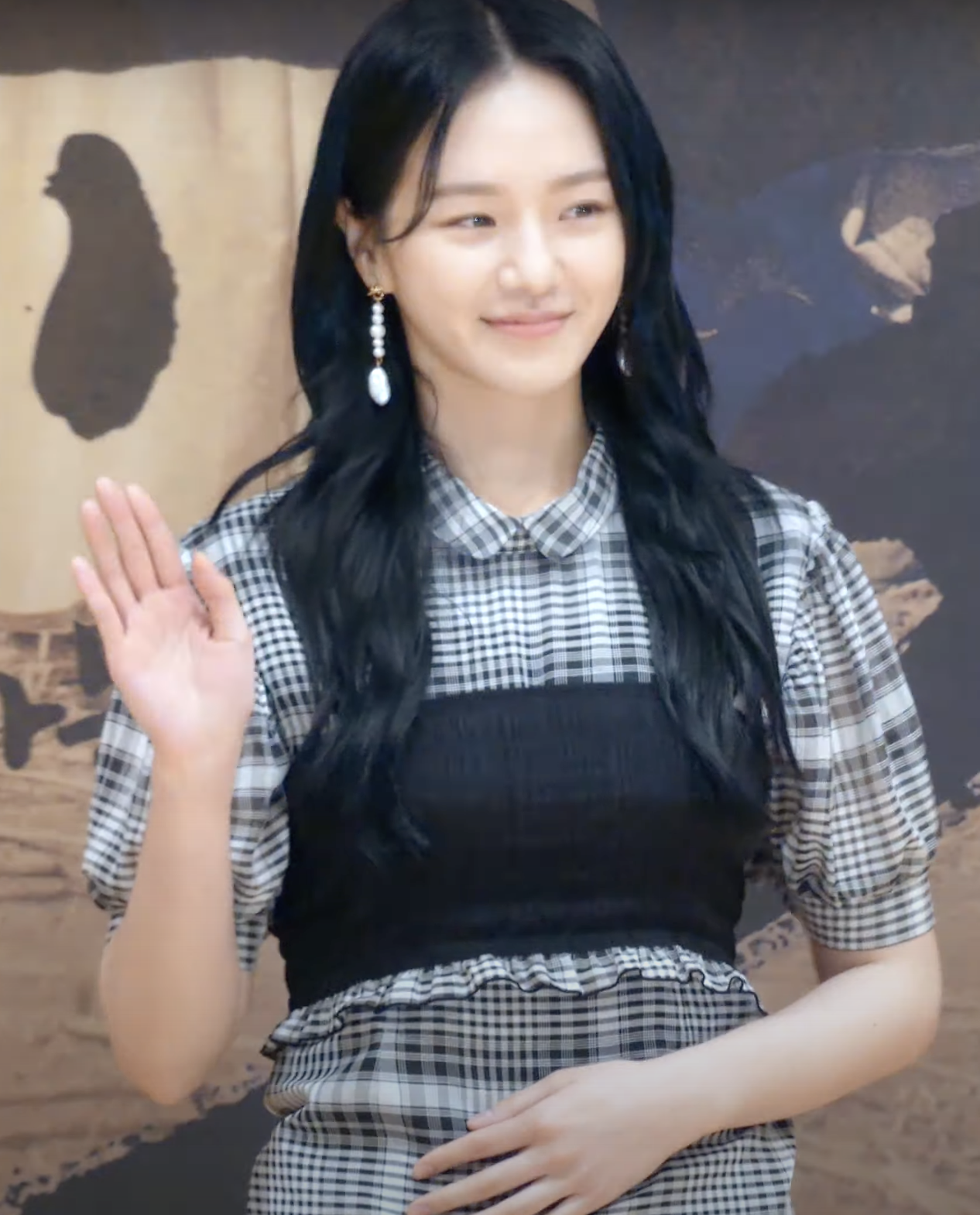
Park in April 2019

=== Film ===
Year	Title	Role	Notes	Ref.
2017	Dear	Ho-jung	Short film	
2017	Close Encounters of the Third Kind	Gyu-young	Short film	
2017	Heart Blackened	College student	Bit part	
2018	Wretches	Ye-ri / Bo-kyung		
2018	Love+Sling	So-young		
2025	Mantis	Shin Jae-yi	Netflix film	

=== Television series ===
Year	Title	Role	Notes	Ref.
2016	Bring It On, Ghost	Lee Se-in		
2016–2017	Solomon's Perjury	Baek Hye-rin		
2017	Suspicious Partner	Park So-young	Cameo (episode 13, 17–19)	
2017	Kang Deok Sun's Love History	Na Aae-hyang	Drama special	
2017	Buzzcut Love	Ji Yool's sister	Drama special	
2017	Fight for My Way	Ahn Su-jeong	Cameo (episode 16)	
2017–2018	Rain or Shine	So-mi		
2018	Queen of Mystery 2	Jang Se-yeon	Cameo (episode 11–13)	
2018	The Tuna and the Dolphin	Kang Hyun-ho	Drama special	
2018	The Third Charm	On Ri-won		
2019	Romance Is a Bonus Book	Oh Ji-yul		
2019	Nokdu Flower	Hwang Myung-shim		
2020	It's Okay to Not Be Okay	Nam Ju-ri		
2020–2023	Sweet Home	Yoon Ji-soo	Season 1–2	
2021	The Devil Judge	Yoon Soo-hyun		
2021	Dali & Cocky Prince	Kim Dali		
2023	Celebrity	Seo A-ri		
2023–2024	A Good Day to Be a Dog	Han Hae-na		
2024–2025	Squid Game	Kang No-eul	Season 2–Season 3	
2025	Nine Puzzles	Lee Seung-joo		
2026	Unfriend †	Shin Ga-young		
TBA	Fall in! Love	Dok Sae		

=== Web series ===
Year	Title	Role	Notes	Ref.
2016	Touching You	Customer	Cameo (Episode 7-8)	
2017	Magic School	Yoo-ri		
2018	Miss Independent Jieun	Kim Ji-eun		
2018	Why Are Girls Always Angry?	Kyu-young		

=== Web show ===
Year	Title	Role	Notes	Ref.
2018	Nemo Travel: Western Australia	Cast member	NPIO YouTube Channel	
2019	Nemo Travel: Southern France	Cast member	NPIO YouTube Channel	

=== Music video appearances ===
Year	Song title	Artist	Ref.
2016	"Crosswalk"	Jo Kwon	
2017	"Remains"	Kwak Jin-eon	
2017	"I Like You"	Day6	
2018	"You're the Reason"	Urban Zakapa	
2018	"As I Wished"	Urban Zakapa	
2020	"I Will"	Lee Seung-gi	
2021	"Beautiful Night"	Yesung	

=== Hosting ===
Year	Title	Notes	Ref.
2023	2023 MBC Drama Awards	with Kim Sung-joo	

== Accolades ==
=== Awards and nominations ===
Name of the award ceremony, year presented, category, nominee of the award, and the result of the nomination
Award ceremony	Year	Category	Nominee / Work	Result	Ref.
APAN Star Awards	2023	Best Couple Award	Park Gyu-young with Cha Eun-woo; A Good Day to Be a Dog	Nominated	
Baeksang Arts Awards	2021	Best New Actress – Television	Sweet Home	Nominated	
KBS Drama Awards	2021	Best New Actress	Dali and the Cocky Prince	Won	
KBS Drama Awards	2021	Best Couple Award	Park Gyu-young with Kim Min-jae; Dali and the Cocky Prince	Won	
MBC Drama Awards	2023	Excellence Award, Actress in a Miniseries	A Good Day to Be a Dog	Won	
MBC Drama Awards	2023	Best Couple Award	Park Gyu-young with Cha Eun-woo; A Good Day to Be a Dog	Nominated	

=== Listicles ===
Name of publisher, year listed, name of listicle, and placement
Publisher	Year	Listicle	Placement	Ref.
Cine21	2018	Rising Star Actors in Korean Movies in 2018	Placed	
Cine21	2020	New Actress to watch out for in 2021	5th (Note: Tied with Go Min-si, Kim Da-mi, Kim Se-jeong, Park Hye-su, and Jeong Su-jeong)	
Cine21	2021	New Actress to watch out for in 2022	6th (Note: Tied with Park Eun-bin, Moon Ga-young, Keum Sae-rok, Joo Hyun-young, Go Min-si, Lee Soo-kyung, Roh Yoon-seo, Gong Seung-yeon, Lee Se-young, IU, Shin Hyun-been, Park Ji-hu, Go Min-si, Jung Ji-so, Bang Min-ah, Jeon Jong-seo, Roh Jeong-eui)	
