= Kim Min-jae (actor, born 1996) =

South Korean actor (born 1996)

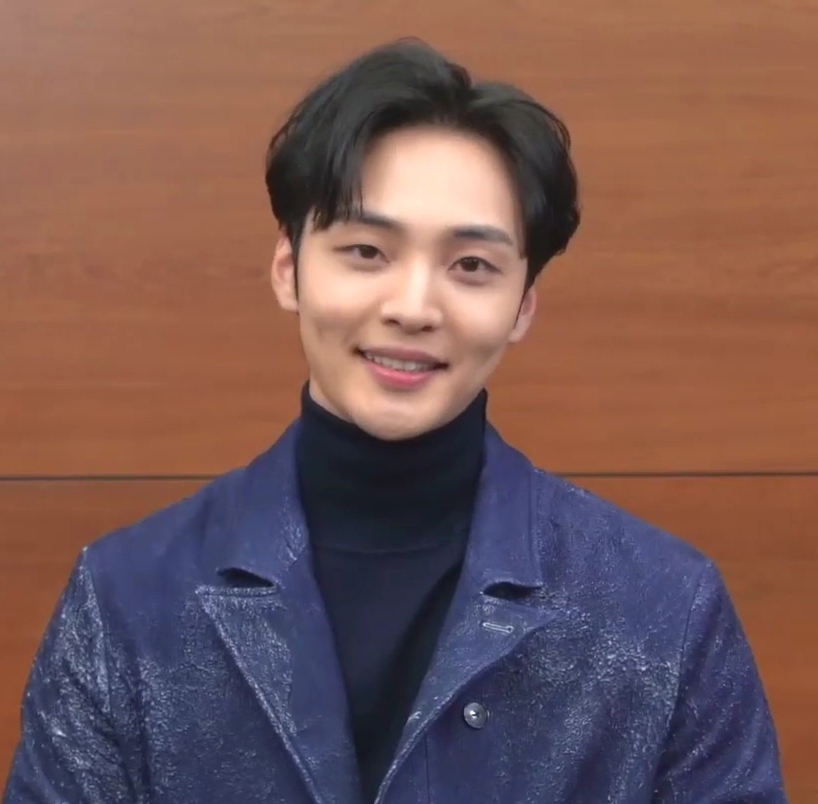
- Kim in 2022
- Born: November 1, 1996 (age 30); Anyang, Gyeonggi, South Korea
- Other name: Real.be
- Education: Chung Ang University
- Occupations: Actor; rapper
- Years active: 2015–present
- Agent: YAMYAM Entertainment

Korean name
- Hangul: 김민재
- RR: Gim Minjae
- MR: Kim Minjae
- Website: yamyament.com/kim-min-jae

Kim Min-jae (Korean: 김민재; born November 1, 1996) also known as Real.be, is a South Korean actor and rapper. He starred in television series Second 20s (2015), My First Time (2015), Dr. Romantic (2016), Guardian: The Lonely and Great God (2016), Hit the Top (2017), Tempted (2018), Flower Crew: Joseon Marriage Agency (2019), Dr. Romantic 2 (2020), Do You Like Brahms? (2020), Dali & Cocky Prince (2021), Poong, the Joseon Psychiatrist (2022), and Dr. Romantic 3 (2023). He was also a contestant in the rap competition Show Me the Money 4 in 2015.

== Early life and education ==
Kim studied composition and piano-playing at a music academy in middle school. Kim then auditioned for CJ E&M and became a first generation trainee of the company for four years from his first year of high school, at Seoul Performing Arts High School (SOPA).

Since March 2016, Kim attends Chung-Ang University.

== Career ==
=== 2014–2015: Debut and Show Me the Money 4 ===
Kim was featured in music stages of CJ E&M artists as a rapper since 2014 and was one of the first generation of trainees from CJ E&M. Kim debuted as an actor in 2014 in a joint South Korean-Vietnamese drama Forever Young. He also had a cameo role in the tvN drama I Need Romance 3 (2014) as an idol singer preparing for debut.

While he was preparing for his debut as an idol singer, he was cast in Mnet's drama Perseverance Goo Hae-ra in 2015 after going through several auditions. Kim then made a cameo appearance in KBS2's drama The Producers as one of 2 Days & 1 Night – Season 5 cast members. In June the same year, Kim joined the rap competition Show Me the Money 4 as a contestant.

Kim was then cast in supporting roles in the dramas Second 20s (2015) and My First Time (2015). Kim also featured in the singles "Our Feeling" for the soundtrack of My First Time with Park So-dam and Lee Yi-kyung, and "Star" for the soundtrack of Second 20s with Mamamoo's Solar.

On November 21, 2015, Kim, alongside Kim Sae-ron, started hosting MBC's music program Show! Music Core. They left the show in September 2016.

=== 2016–present: Rising popularity ===
In 2016, Kim featured in MBC's family drama My Little Baby. Kim then featured in the medical drama Dr. Romantic and received a New Star award for his role at the SBS Drama Awards. He also made a special appearance in tvN's hit fantasy drama Guardian: The Lonely and Great God (2016), which garnered him increased recognition.

In 2017, Kim starred in KBS2' variety drama Hit the Top. The same year, Kim was cast in the film Love+Sling which marked his big screen debut. He was also cast in Feng Shui, the third installment of the "divining art trilogy" by Han Jae-rim.

In 2018, Kim was cast to play a wealthy playboy in MBC's romance thriller Tempted.

In 2019, Kim starred in the youth historical drama Flower Crew: Joseon Marriage Agency which marked his first leading role. In June, Kim signed up with a new agency YamYam Entertainment.

In 2020, Kim reprised his role of Park Eun-tak in Dr. Romantic 2. The same year he starred in SBS drama Do You Like Brahms?, playing Park Joon-young, a world-renowned pianist for which he received Excellence Award, Actor in a Miniseries Fantasy/Romance Drama and Best Couple Award with Park Eun-bin at 2020 SBS Drama Awards.

In 2021, Kim participated in composing the lyrics of "I'm Jealous" on his label mate Punch's second mini album Full Bloom. Later that year, Kim starred in the drama Dali & Cocky Prince, which premiered in September on KBS2. He played the role of Jin Moo-hak, rich young man who has little education and no background but knows to make money for which he received Excellence Award, Actor in a Miniseries at 2021 KBS Drama Awards.

In 2022, Kim played the titular Yoo Se-poong in the tvN historical medical drama Poong, the Joseon Psychiatrist.

In 2023, Kim reprised his role of Park Eun-tak in Dr. Romantic 3.

== Personal life ==
=== Military service ===
In February 2023, Kim told the media that he plans to enlist in the mandatory military service this year or in 2024. On September 6, 2023, Kim's agency announced that Kim would enter military service on September 18. After completing basic training, Kim will be sent to the Army band Unit. Kim was officially discharged on March 17, 2025.

== Filmography ==
=== Film ===
Year	Title	Role	Notes	Ref.
2018	Love+Sling	Sung-woong		
2018	Feng Shui	Crown Prince Hyomyeong	Cameo	
2018	Swing Kids	voice of Ro Ki-Jin	Cameo	

=== Television series ===
Year	Title	Role	Notes	Ref.
2014	Forever Young	Kay		
2014	I Need Romance 3	Idol trainee	Cameo	
2015	Persevere, Goo Hae-ra	Sa Gi-joon		
2015	The Producers	Himself	Cameo (Episode 4, 10, 12)	
2015	Second 20s	Kim Min-soo		
2015	My First Time	Seo Ji-an		
2016	My Little Baby	Yoon Min		
2016–2023	Dr. Romantic	Park Eun-tak	Season 1–3	
2016	Guardian: The Lonely and Great God	Wang Yeo	Cameo (Episode 1, 7–13)	
2017	Hit the Top	Lee Ji-hoon		
2018	Tempted	Lee Se-joo		
2018	Mr. Sunshine	adult Do-mi	Cameo (Episode 24)	
2019	Flower Crew: Joseon Marriage Agency	Ma Hoon		
2020	Do You Like Brahms?	Park Joon-Young		
2021	Dali & Cocky Prince	Jin Moo-hak		
2022–2023	Poong, the Joseon Psychiatrist	Yoo Se-poong	Season 1–2	

=== Web series ===
Year	Title	Role	Notes	Ref.
2023	Bloodhounds	Kim Jae-min	Cameo (Episode 7–8)	

=== Television shows ===
Year	Title	Role	Notes	Ref.
2015	Show Me the Money 4	Contestant	Episode 1–2	
2015	Mari and Me	Cast member		
2016	Celebrity Bromance (Season 1)	Cast member	with BTS' V (Episode 1–4)	

=== Hosting ===
Title	Date	Notes	Ref.
Show! Music Core	November 21, 2015 – September 24, 2016	with Kim Sae-ron	

=== Music video appearances ===
Year	Song title	Artist	Ref.
2015	"Celepretty"	Park Bo-ram	
2015	"Good Luck"	Hong Dae-kwang	
2017	"Would U"	Red Velvet	
2019	"Heart" (이마음)	Punch	
2026	"OMW"	Park Junhee	

== Discography ==
=== Singles ===
Title	Year	Album
"Star" (with Solar)	2015	Second 20s soundtrack
"Our Feeling" (Lee Yoon Chan feat. Kim Min-jae, Park So-dam & Lee Yi-kyung)	2015	My First Time soundtrack
"Dream" (with Younha)	2017	Hit the Top soundtrack
"That's The Way It Goes (ft. Kim Min-jae [Real.be])"	2018	Prison Playbook soundtrack
"I'm Jealous" (Punch ft. Kim Min-jae [Real.be])	2021	Full Bloom
"Thank You for the Memories" (with Dr. Romantic 3 cast)	2023	Romantic Doctor 3 soundtrack

== Awards and nominations ==
Name of the award ceremony, year presented, category, nominee of the award, and the result of the nomination
Award ceremony	Year	Category	Nominee / Work	Result	Ref.
APAN Star Awards	2018	Best New Actor	Tempted	Nominated	
APAN Star Awards	2021	Excellence Award, Actor in a Miniseries	Do You Like Brahms?	Nominated	
Asia Artist Awards	2020	Popularity Award (Actor)	Kim Min-jae	Nominated	
Baeksang Arts Awards	2017	Best New Actor – Television	Dr. Romantic	Nominated	
KBS Drama Awards	2021	Excellence Award, Actor in a Miniseries	Dali & Cocky Prince	Won	
KBS Drama Awards	2021	Best Couple Award	Kim Min-jae with Park Gyu-young; Dali and the Cocky Prince	Won	
MBC Drama Awards	2018	Best New Actor	Tempted	Nominated	
SBS Drama Awards	2016	New Star Award	Dr. Romantic	Won	
SBS Drama Awards	2020	Excellence Award, Actor in a Miniseries Fantasy/Romance Drama	Do You Like Brahms?	Won	
SBS Drama Awards	2020	Best Couple Award	Kim Min-jae with Park Eun-bin; Do You Like Brahms?	Won	
SBS Drama Awards	2023	Excellence Award, Actor in a Seasonal Drama	Dr. Romantic 3	Nominated	
The Seoul Awards	2017	Best New Actor (Drama)	Hit the Top	Nominated	
