= My Little Baby =

- Official Poster
- Genre: Comedy, Romance, Family
- Written by: Kim Yoon-Hee; Lee Eun-yeong
- Directed by: Han Cheol-soo; Lee Soo-ok
- Starring: Oh Ji-ho; Lee Soo-kyung; Kim Min-jae; Nam Ji-hyun
- Country of origin: South Korea
- Original language: Korean
- No. of episodes: 16

Production
- Executive producer: Kim Ho Young
- Producer: Jo Jae Yun
- Running time: 35 minutes
- Production company: S-PEACE

Original release
- Network: MBC, MBC Every 1
- Release: March 5 – April 23, 2016

My Little Baby (Korean: 마이 리틀 베이비) is a South Korean TV series, starring Oh Ji-ho, Lee Soo-kyung, Kim Min-jae and Nam Ji-hyun. The first episode was aired on March 5, 2016 on MBC.

== Cast ==
=== Main cast ===
- Oh Ji-ho as Cha Jung-Han
- Lee Soo-kyung as Han Ye-Seul
- Kim Min-jae as Yoon Min
- Nam Ji-hyun (Note: Credited as Son Ji-hyun.) as Han So-Yoon

=== Supporting cast ===
==== Mom Community ====
- Jung Soo-young as Jo Ji-Young
- Go Soo-hee as Kang Yoon-Sook
- Joo Sae-byuk as Kim Bo-Mi

==== Others ====
- Yoo Na-rand as Seo Eun-Ae
- Hong Eun-taek as Kim Hoon-Goo
- Jang Hee-soo as Ma Jung-Soon
- Tae Hang-ho as Seo Jang-Hoon
- Kim Sung-gi as Han Sa-Jang
- Seo Woo-jin as (Supporting)
- Kim Ha-yeon as Eun-ae, Cha Jung-han's daughter

== Original Soundtracks ==
=== My Little Baby OST Part 1 ===
Track listing
No.	Title	Artist	Length
1.	"My Little Baby"	Yun Kyu Sung, Jang Woo Ram feat. Kwon Oh of Freshboys	3:46
2.	"My Little Baby" (Instrumental)	Yun Kyu Sung, Jang Woo Ram feat. Kwon Oh of Freshboys	3:46

=== My Little Baby OST Part 2 ===
Track listing
No.	Title	Artist	Length
1.	"Lululala My Love"	Jungheum Band	3:07
2.	"Lululala My Love" (Instrumental)	Jungheum Band	3:07

=== My Little Baby OST Part 3 ===
Track listing
No.	Title	Artist	Length
1.	"Little Thing"	5NL	3:50
2.	"Little Thing" (Instrumental)	5NL	3:50

== Ratings ==
Note: The blue color indicates lowest rating while red color indicates highest rating.

Episode #	Date	AGB%	TNmS%
1	March 5, 2016	2.7%	2.4%
2	March 5, 2016	2.0%	1.6%
3	March 12, 2016	2.5%	2.4%
4	March 12, 2016	2.1%	1.9%
5	March 19, 2016	2.5%	2.3%
6	March 19, 2016	1.7%	1.6%
7	March 26, 2016	3.4%	2.6%
8	March 26, 2016	2.3%	1.8%
9	April 2, 2016	2.8%	1.9%
10	April 2, 2016	2.1%	1.3%
11	April 9, 2016	2.3%	1.6%
12	April 9, 2016	1.7%	1.4%
13	April 16, 2016	2.3%	1.5%
14	April 16, 2016	1.7%	1.3%
15	April 23, 2016	2.0%	1.2%
16	April 23, 2016	1.4%	0.9%
Average		2.2%	1.8%

Note: This drama airs two episodes back-to-back late at night and therefore has a relatively small audience compared to primetime dramas.

== Rerun ==
My Little Baby was rerun by MBC for three weeks from Oct. 23, 2017 to Nov. 10, 2017 in the morning drama time slot (Monday to Friday 7:50 a.m.), after the production of 120-episode drama Reverse, the replacement of Teacher Oh Soon-nam, was delayed.
