= Sweet Home (webtoon) =

South Korean webtoon

- Cover art of the Wisdom House comic book edition (volume 1)

스위트 홈 RR: Seuwiteu hom MR: Sŭwit'ŭ hom
- Genre: Horror; Thriller; Apocalyptic
- Author: Kim Carnby
- Illustrator: Hwang Young-chan
- Publisher: Naver; Wisdom House
- English publisher: Naver
- Magazine: Naver Webtoon (original Korean); WEBTOON (official English translation)
- Original run: October 12, 2017 – July 2, 2020
- Collected volumes: 12

Television adaptation(s)

Sweet Home (Korean: 스위트 홈) is a South Korean webtoon written by Kim Carnby and illustrated by Hwang Young-chan. First published in Naver Webtoon, the webtoon ran for a total of 140 chapters plus 1 prologue from October 12, 2017, to July 2, 2020. It centers on a suicidal high school boy who, along with a group of fellow apartment residents, tries to survive a "monsterization" apocalypse (goemulhwa) (Note: Korean: 괴물화; Hanja: 怪物化; RR: goemulhwa; Korean pronunciation: [kwe̞ːmuɾβwa̠~kø̞ːmuɾβwa̠]; lit. "transformation into a monster") where people turn into monsters that reflect their innermost, most desperate desires.

The webtoon is the second collaborative work by Kim and Hwang, the first being Bastard (2014–2016). As of January 2021, its official English version garnered 2.4 million subscribers and 15.2 million likes. A print version of Sweet Home was released since February 28, 2020 by Wisdom House. It has also been adapted into a Netflix series of the same name released on December 18, 2020. A prequel titled Shotgun Boy, (Note: Korean: 엽총소년; RR: Yeopchongsonyeon) written by Kim and illustrated by Hongpil with Hwang providing editorial supervision, was released in Naver Webtoon starting February 22, 2021.

== Plot ==
=== Prologue, Chapters 1–38 ===
After his family is tragically killed in a vehicular accident, suicidal 18-year-old Cha Hyun-soo (Note: The character is named Hyun Cha in the official English translation.) moves into Room 1410 of the Green Home apartment complex. Soon after, he and other residents begin experiencing auditory hallucinations and nosebleeds, and one night, through his video door-phone, he witnesses his female neighbor from Room 1411 transform into a human-eating monster.

Two days later, Hyun-soo learns that society has collapsed as people undergo a "monsterization" apocalypse (goemulhwa), a phenomenon widely discussed online. Downstairs, a group of residents led by Lee Eun-hyuk (Note: The character is named Hyuk Lee in the official English translation.) fend off the first monster attack on the building, but not before one is killed. Many more residents are killed as the attacks continue. Hyun-soo crafts a makeshift spear with a kitchen knife as a spearhead and, following advice from Han Du-sik of Room 1408, uses his phone as a monster detector, where if a call produces a beeping sound, it signals a monster is nearby. He goes to Room 1408, where Du-sik modifies his spear to deliver an electric shock.

Hyun-soo rescues two orphaned siblings, 9-year-old Kim Soo-young (Note: The character is named Sook in the official English translation.) and 6-year-old Kim Young-soo, (Note: The character is named Yeong in the official English translation.) in Room 1210. However, as he attempts to return to Du-sik's apartment, his transformation into a monster momentarily takes hold and another attack separates him from the children. Yoon Ji-soo of Room 1510 and Jung Jae-heon (Note: The character is named Jayhun in the official English translation.) of Room 1506 rescue him. Meanwhile, the children are caught in a battle between two monsters but are saved by Im Myung-sook (Note: The character is named Myeong-ja in the official English translation.), a partially 'monsterized' resident. Hyun-soo, Ji-soo, and Jae-heon arrive to help her.

After spending a day in Du-sik's apartment, Hyun-soo, Ji-soo, and Jae-heon decide to join the survivors on the ground floor, leaving the children in Myung-sook and Du-sik's care. During a battle with a monster, Hyun-soo is knocked unconscious. In his mind, his inner monster tempts him with a hallucination where he watches his favorite film, Maria From the Sky (Note: Korean: 마리아는 하늘에서; RR: Marianeun haneureseo; pron. [maɾianɯn ha̠nɯɾe̞sʰʌ̹]; lit. "Maria in the sky"). Realizing he is only hallucinating, Hyun-soo rejects the temptation and awakes to find Eun-hyuk and his younger sister, Lee Eun-yoo (Note: The character is named Eun Lee in the official English translation.), by his side.

=== Chapters 39–85 ===
The residents debate whether to oust Hyun-soo due to his partial monsterization. Eun-hyuk proposes a vote but argues that forcing him out would be tantamount to killing him. The vote results in a tie, causing an elderly man, Kim Seok-hyun, (Note: The character is named Seok Kim in the official English translation.) to protest. However, his nose begins to bleed, exposing his own impending monsterization. Later, Eun-hyuk tasks Hyun-soo and Pyeon Sang-wook, (Note: The character is named Wook Pyeon in the official English translation.), a gangster-like resident, with rescuing the survivors in Room 1408 to utilize Du-sik's technical skills. While they are away, Myung-sook fully succumbs to monsterization; however, her deep longing for her lost child rather transforms her into a passive, fetus-like monster within Du-sik's apartment.

(From left) Yoo-ri, Gil-seop, Hyun-soo, and Sang-wook in a scene from Ch. 58

On their way to Du-sik's apartment, Hyun-soo and Sang-wook encounter other survivors: elderly Ahn Gil-seop (Note: The character is named Seop Ahn in the official English translation.) and his caretaker Park Yoo-ri. The two successfully return to the ground floor with Du-sik, leaving Gil-seop, Yoo-ri and the children in Du-sik's apartment. Du-sik repairs one of the apartment's elevators but it inadvertently leads to the fully monsterized security guard entering the ground floor and attacking the residents, killing many, including Jae-heon. The sight of Jae-heon's corpse causes Hyun-soo's inner monster to temporarily manifest. Upon regaining control, he kills the monsterized security guard. The remaining survivors in Du-sik's apartment use the elevator to join the ground floor survivors.

A group consisting of Hyun-soo, Sang-wook, Ji-soo, Gil-seop and Yoo-ri successfully retakes the underground parking lot from the monsters. Du-sik modifies a car into an armored vehicle, which Hyun-soo, Sang-wook, Gil-seop, and another survivor, Byung-il, use to venture outside the complex in search of food and medical supplies. However, a monster attacks them, killing Gil-seop while Byung-il escapes. Just as Eun-hyuk and the remaining survivors prepare to leave the complex to help Hyun-soo and Sang-wook, Byung-il returns with a prison bus and runs over the monster, killing it. Byung-il emerges from the bus with five outsiders, the first four of whom Sang-wook immediately recognizes as criminals: group leader Shin Joong-seop (Note: The character is named Joon Shin in the official English translation.), conman Im Hyun-sik, rapist Seo Kap-soo, and gangster Baek Ho-yeon.

=== Chapters 86–111 ===
The Green Home residents are forced to accommodate the criminals, leading to rising tensions as the criminals begin enacting their secret plan to take control of the complex. While Hyun-sik spreads fear and discord among the survivors, Joong-seop tries to recruit Hyun-soo to join their group and reveals another outsider, a young man named Yi-hyun, to be a powerful half-monster. The criminals soon assume superiority, leading to some residents joining their side, including Hyun-soo. Eun-hyuk, refusing to share any plans with the criminals, is imprisoned along with Sang-wook. Eun-hyuk reveals to Sang-wook that he has a plan known only to himself and Du-sik, but he collapses after his nose starts to bleed. Du-sik is forced to show Joong-seop a large box containing what appears to be a chain of clothes, which Joong-seop dismisses. Du-sik is relieved, as the "rope" is actually over 100 meters long with a grappling hook at the end.

Hyun-soo battling against fellow half-monster Yi-hyun (in the foreground) in a scene from Chapter 101

On Joong-seop's orders, Hyun-soo and Yi-hyun search the upper levels of Green Home for monsters. Yi-hyun, communicating with Hyun-soo's inner monster, finds out about the harmless fetus monster in Du-sik's apartment bathroom and, under the influence of his own inner monster, attempts to kill it. Hyun-soo fights Yi-hyun to protect the monster and manages to knock Yi-hyun back to his normal state. When they check the bathroom again, they find a human-sized cocoon where the monster once was, which Hyun-soo realizes is alive after hearing a heartbeat. Yi-hyun, fearing it is a potential threat, attempts to destroy it but his half-monsterization powers unexpectedly resist, knocking him unconscious.

Ji-soo arrives in the apartment as Hyun-soo remains hesitant about destroying the cocoon. Although also seeing it as a potential threat, Ji-soo is reluctant to act and tells Hyun-soo that Eun-hyuk and Sang-wook are imprisoned. Yi-hyun regains consciousness with his inner monster's personality and sets the cocoon on fire with his lighter, causing nearby monsters to swarm the complex. He then rushes to the rooftop, where he believes he sees a naked woman standing on the parapet. Meanwhile, Sang-wook and Eun-hyuk escape imprisonment and discover coolers containing chopped human remains in the outsiders' prison bus. Sang-wook attempts to use the remains to lure the monsters away from the complex but comes upon a grove with four cocoons. To his shock, he witnesses a naked human emerge from one of the cocoons.

=== Chapters 112–139 ===
As monsters begin breaching the barricade on the front door, Eun-hyuk confirms to Du-sik that the survivors must proceed with their escape plan: launching the grappling hook from the rooftop to zipline to a hill 80 meters away. Eun-yoo uses Ji-soo's smartphone to distract the monsters, allowing the survivors flee to the upper floors. Sang-wook uses the prison bus to block the front door and throws Joong-seop to the monsters. Du-sik, who is undergoing monsterization himself, decides to stay behind in the underground parking lot and starts a fire to kill multiple monsters. As Eun-hyuk and the survivors arrive at the rooftop, Hyun-soo goes to the parking lot, where he finds Du-sik dying. A naked man appears and triggers another hallucination in Hyun-soo with his inner monster.

The inner monster reveals the true nature of monsterization to be a "revolution" and a "new beginning". Inner monsters, malevolent versions of their hosts' souls, take control when the hosts succumb to its callings, after which the hosts transform into monsters that reflect their desires. After the hosts' desires are fulfilled, they become new humans — emotionless beings thriving on a "sense of futility". Hyun-soo rejects his inner monster's temptations, firmly deciding to remain himself and continue fighting.

Near-monsterized Hyun-soo emerges victorious in a fierce battle against monsters in a scene from Chapter 135.

Sang-wook and Hyun-sik join Hyun-soo in the parking lot, where they kill the fully monsterized Du-sik. Meanwhile, Ji-soo returns to her apartment room and uses her bass guitar and amplifier to lure the monsters away from the rooftop, leaving a manageable number to fight. Hyun-soo, briefly succumbing to his inner monster, rescues Ji-soo in his near-monsterized form. After Eun-hyuk and Byung-il set up the escape equipment, Eun-hyuk decides to remain in the building due to his own monsterization.

The women and children zipline to safety first. Eun-hyuk, Sang-wook, and Yi-hyun join Hyun-soo and Ji-soo in fighting the remaining monsters. They then head to the rooftop, but their escape is thwarted by the fully monsterized Joong-seop. With no other choice, Hyun-soo sacrifices himself to fully embrace his monsterization, transforming into a powerful monster resembling his favorite character from Maria From the Sky and allowing him to defeat Joong-seop with one blow. Ji-soo tries to communicate with him, but the true Hyun-soo only responds faintly to her voice, while the monster reacts with hostility. Eun-hyuk, deciding to also embrace his monsterization to stop Hyun-soo, transforms into a massive tangle that engulfs the monsterized Hyun-soo, killing them both.

After the battle, rain falls over the remains of the two monsterized men. Most of the remains disintegrate, causing two cocoons to materialize; Hyun-soo emerges from one of them and descends the building. On the ground floor, he finds Ji-soo's unlocked smartphone and plays an audio file, revealed to be Ji-soo's composition, which was supposed to have lyrics written by the old Hyun-soo. Strangely, the new Hyun-soo listens to the music and sheds tears.

=== Chapter 140 (Epilogue) ===
During winter in the post-apocalyptic (Note: Presumably months after the main events of the story) world, the Green Home survivors live in a military camp. While guarding the perimeter, Byung-il notices something approaching and calls for Ji-soo. She rushes to the fence and sees Hyun-soo, barefoot and dressed in thin clothing, walking through the snow toward the camp. Upon seeing Ji-soo, Hyun-soo smiles with tear-filled eyes. Ji-soo, overcome with emotion, steps beyond the fence and embraces him tightly as the other survivors hurry to reunite with him.

== Characters ==
=== Main ===
- Cha Hyun-soo

An 18-year-old who becomes a half-monster and the protagonist of the webtoon. Formerly a spoiled and suicidal high-school student, he is the sole occupant of Room 1410 in Green Home after losing his family in a car accident. He severed ties with his relatives after a dispute over his small inheritance, which he intended to live off before pursuing a professional gaming career. Shortly after moving in, Hyun-soo finds himself caught in a "monsterization" apocalypse, and fights against monsters using a makeshift spear with an electrified knife as its tip. Due to his strong resistance to his inner monster, he does not fully transform, instead becoming a "half-monster" with abilities such as self-healing, electricity resistance, and enhanced strength, agility, and durability. Over time, he develops feelings for Ji-soo.

- Yoon Ji-soo

A 20-year-old bass guitarist and composer, as well as the sole occupant of Room 1510 in Green Home after her boyfriend's suicide. Since her unit is directly above Hyun-soo's, her loud bass playing frequently disturbs him. In the wake of the apocalypse, she assists Hyun-soo in battles against monsters, wielding a baseball bat as her weapon, and later develops feelings for him.

- Pyeon Sang-wook

A 32-year-old former police officer and Green Home resident. Due to his tall, muscular build and intimidating presence, he is often mistaken for a gangster. He fights alongside Hyun-soo and the survivors using brute strength and is responsible for guarding food supplies and rationing resources. Later, it is revealed he was dismissed from the police force for excessive use of force. He eventually develops feelings for Yoo-ri.

- Lee Eun-hyuk

An 18-year-old resident of Green Home and the older brother of Eun-yoo. Despite his young age, Eun-hyuk becomes leader of the survivors thanks to his quick, strategic thinking and composure. Online, he goes by the alias "CrewCrew" (Note: Korean: 크루크루; RR: Keurukeuru; pron. [kxɯɾu.kxɯɾu]) in gaming. In the prequel Shotgun Boy, he is revealed to be a friend of the main character, Han Kyu-hwan.

=== Supporting ===
==== Green Home Residents ====
- Han Du-sik

A former engineer and the sole occupant of Room 1408. Du-sik lost his leg while rescuing a child and relies on a wheelchair. Skilled in crafting weapons, he enhances the survivors' gear — most notably Hyun-soo's spear — and works with Eun-hyuk to devise an escape plan.

- Jung Jae-heon

a Korean language teacher from Room 1506. A devout Christian, Jae-heon wields a long sword and recites prayers while fighting mosters.

- Lee Eun-yoo

Eun-hyuk's younger sister. She carries a lighter and aerosol spray, which she uses to set monsters on fire.

- Park Yoo-ri

A 28-year-old resident and caretaker of Gil-seop. She fights using a crossbow and later develops a romantic relationship with Sang-wook.

- Ahn Gil-seop

A 50-year-old resident of Green Home under Yoo-ri's care. He fights monsters using Molotov cocktails.

- Kim Soo-young

A 9-year-old girl from Room 1210 and Young-soo's older sister. Their father is tragically killed by a monster.

- Kim Young-soo

A 6-year-old boy from Room 1210 and Soo-young's younger brother.

- Im Myung-sook

A middle-aged woman and half-monster resident of Green Home. Driven delusional from grief, Myung-sook believes her deceased infant is still alive. Her intense longing allows her to resist hostile monsterization, transforming her into a harmless, giant fetus-like creature.

- Byung-il

A resident who unknowingly leads a group of outsiders into Green Home, unaware of their true intentions.

- Ahn Seon-young (Note: The character is named Seon Ahn in the official English translation.)

Seok-hyun's abused wife and a resident of Green Home.

- Kim Seok-hyun

Seon-young's abusive husband. Seok-hyun strongly adheres to traditionalist beliefs, viewing adults as inherently superior to younger people.

- Son Hye-in

A fearful resident prone to rash survival decisions. She later sides with the outsiders.

- Security Guard

The unnamed security guard of the Green Home apartment complex. Resentful of the residents' mistreatment, he transforms into a monster that grows stronger and heavier with each kill.

- Girl from Room 1411

Hyun-soo's next-door neighbor and an aspiring celebrity. She frequently starves herself in pursuit of fame, transforming her into a ravenous, flesh-eating monster. She is the first monster Hyun-soo encounters.

- Ryu Jae-hwan (Note: The character is named Jay Ryu in the official English translation.)

Also an aspiring celebrity who transforms into an attention-seeking monster, causing intense headaches in victims who fail to compliment him.

- Sang-soo

A resident who sides with the outsiders.

- Ji-eun

A resident who also sides with the outsiders.

==== Outsiders ====
- Shin Joong-seop

The leader of a group of criminals. Joong-seop is driven by a desire to kill monsters after losing his entire family to them. He is familiar with Sang-wook.

- Im Hyun-sik

A member of Joong-seop's group of criminals, Hyun-sik is a conman.

- Jo Yi-hyun

A half-monsterized man who is an outsider, but not a member of Joong-seop's group of criminals. He has multiple personalities, only one of which is controlled by his inner monster, preventing full monsterization. Yi-hyun has the ability to extend his arms, which can swell or transform into a branching form capable of stabbing multiple monsters simultaneously.

- Seo Kap-soo

A criminal in Joong-seop's group and a rapist.

- Baek Ho-yeon

A gangster in Joong-seop's group.

==== Notable Monsters ====
Note: The following monsters are in their monster forms upon their first appearance in the webtoon. Some of their former human identities are revealed through flashbacks or hints in the story.

- Blood-sucking Monster (Note: Korean: 흡혈 괴물; RR: heuphyeol goemul; pron. [xɯpʰjʌ̹ɭɡwe̞ːmuɭ] ~ [xɯpʰjʌ̹ɭɡø̞ːmuɭ])

the first monster to invade and attack the Green Home apartment complex. It is a humanoid, hematophagous monster with a large mouth extending to its chest and a long, proboscis-like tongue used to drain its victims' blood.

- Half-headed Monster (Note: Korean: 장님 괴물; RR: jangnim goemul; pron. [t͡ɕa̠ŋnimɡwe̞ːmuɭ] ~ [t͡ɕa̠ŋnimɡø̞ːmuɭ]; lit. "blind monster")

A blind humanoid monster that became half-headed after Jae-heon sliced its head transversely. Highly sensitive to sound, it can extend its arms like Yi-hyun, allowing it to puncture objects and impale humans or other monsters at high speed. The monster was once a disgruntled office worker who lost his job.

- Eyeball Monster (Note: Korean: 눈알 괴물; RR: nunal goemul; pron. [nuna̠ɭɡwe̞ːmuɭ] ~ [nuna̠ɭɡø̞ːmuɭ])

A monster with a long, extendible neck and a giant, round mass with multiple eyes as its head.

- Muscular Monster (Note: Korean: 근육 괴물; RR: geunyuk goemul; pron. [kɯɲjuk̚k͈we̞ːmuɭ] ~ [kɯɲjuk̚k͈ø̞ːmuɭ]; lit. "muscle monster")

A tall, hulking humanoid monster that repeats the words "protein", "strength", and "muscle". It is enraged when mocked for being weak.

- Liquid Monster (Note: Korean: 액체 괴물; RR: aekche goemul; pron. [ɛk̚t͡ɕʰe̞ɡwe̞ːmuɭ], [ɛk̚t͡ɕʰe̞ɡø̞ːmuɭ], [e̞k̚t͡ɕʰe̞ɡwe̞ːmuɭ] or [e̞k̚t͡ɕʰe̞ɡø̞ːmuɭ])

A relatively harmless, non-hostile monster resembling a mass of transparent slime with two floating eyeballs in its "head". It was once a young boy named Min-cheol, who hid in a closet when his mother was killed by the half-headed monster. The monster's repeated phrase, "Can you see me?" hints at Min-cheol's desire to remain unseen.

- Tentacle Monster (Note: Korean: 촉수 괴물; RR: choksu goemul; pron. [t͡ɕʰo̞ks͈uɡwe̞ːmuɭ] ~ [t͡ɕʰo̞ks͈uɡø̞ːmuɭ]) / Spider Monster (Note: Korean: 거미 괴물; RR: geomi goemul; pron. [kʌ̹miɡwe̞ːmuɭ] ~ [kʌ̹miɡø̞ːmuɭ])

Initially a human corpse with multiple tentacles protruding from its back. When set on fire, it douses itself with water from a sprinkler and evolves into a spider-like monster capable of spitting corrosive fluid.

- Long-armed Monster (Note: Korean: 긴팔원숭이 괴물; RR: ginparwonsung-i goemul; pron. [kinpʰa̠ɾwɘːnsʰuŋi ɡwe̞ːmuɭ] ~ [kinpʰa̠ɾwɘːnsʰuŋi ɡø̞ːmuɭ]; lit. "gibbon monster")

A gibbon-like humanoid creature capable of extending its arms. Once a man consumed by guilt after failing to save his son from monsters, the monster repeats, "Hold my hand".

- Track-and-field Monster (Note: Korean: 육상선수 괴물; RR: yuksangseonsu goemul; pron. [juks͈a̠ŋsʰɘːnsʰu ɡwe̞ːmuɭ] ~ [juks͈a̠ŋsʰɘːnsʰu ɡø̞ːmuɭ]; lit. "track-and-field athlete monster")

A fast-moving, three-eyed humanoid that repeats "too slow". It was once a track-and-field athlete who murdered his roommate and rival before becoming a monster.

- Flying Monster (Note: Korean: 박쥐 괴물; RR: bakjwi goemul; pron. [ˈpa̠ːk̚t͡ɕ͈ɥiɡwe̞ːmuɭ], [ˈpa̠ːk̚t͡ɕ͈yɡwe̞ːmuɭ], [ˈpa̠ːk̚t͡ɕ͈ɥiɡø̞ːmuɭ] or [ˈpa̠ːk̚t͡ɕ͈yɡø̞ːmuɭ]; lit. "bat monster")

A bat-like monster, and the only known monster capable of flight.

==== Other characters involved in the monsterization apocalypse ====
- The inner monsters

the malevolent personas that awaken in people and transform them into monsters; the prime movers of the monsterization apocalypse. It is revealed in latter chapters that the inner monsters are the fiendish forms of the souls of humans beings born through the repression of human desires; seeking for the satiating of those desires, they incite a "revolution" through the monsterization apocalypse. An inner monster takes advantage of its host's innermost, most desperate desires and transforms the host into a monster that reflect those desires, while the host's subconscious is imprisoned in a "paradise of desires", a parallel world where those desires are fully met (letting the host turn into an emotionless, desireless human being later on when the desires are finally exhausted).

- The emergent humans (Übermensch)

a new race of humans that emerge from cocoons that form from the remains of dead monsters. When a monster dies or after a monster's true persona exhausts his or her desires while being in the "paradise of desires", the monster transforms into a new human being void of desires and emotions and thriving on a "sense of futility". In the prequel Shotgun Boy, it is revealed that these beings are also referred to as the Übermensch. (Note: This is a reference to the concept of Übermensch (German for "beyond human"), a part of Friedrich Nietzsche's philosophy.)

== Style ==
=== Art ===
The artistic style of Sweet Home is characterized by maintaining a "claustrophobic and grotesque atmosphere". There is additional emphasis on the characters' appearance: the human characters' facial expressions, and the monsters' physical forms which take on a "familiar yet horrific twist". The webtoon also exhibits multiple changes in font style which help set the atmosphere of various scenes, through "color changes, opacity changes, capitalization, size changes, and font changes".

Just like many modern, third-generation webtoons, Sweet Home uses built-in background music, particularly in its 140th chapter (epilogue) which contains a track titled "MZ - Sweet Home (incomplete ver.)".

=== Narrative and characterization ===
Among thriller-horror stories that deal with gruesome characters such as zombies and monsters, Sweet Home is notable for treating a relatively similar set of characters in a different light. This is evident by its introduction of the idea of human beings turning into monsters not through external factors (e.g. virus, curse) but through the expression of their desires.

The webtoon is also said to go beyond simple horror storytelling and focuses on character development, especially on its protagonist Cha Hyun-soo. In the webtoon, Hyun-soo is portrayed as a reclusive boy who, at first, lives only for himself and is ready to die. But as soon as the monsterization apocalypse begins, he makes a big change by wanting to step out of his room, connecting with other people and staying alive.

== Background and publication history ==
=== Naver webtoon ===
Sweet Home marks the second collaborative work between webtoon writer Kim Carnby and webtoon artist Hwang Young-chan. The first work by Kim and Hwang is Bastard (2014–16), a thriller story about son who lives with his father, a serial killer.

First published in Naver Webtoon, Sweet Home ran on a weekly basis on Thursdays. Its prologue was uploaded on October 12, 2017, followed by the first chapter on October 19; the webtoon ended with the uploading of its epilogue and 140th chapter on July 2, 2020. The official English version of the webtoon (Prologue up to Chapter 139) was uploaded on Mondays in WEBTOON starting January 15, 2018, while Chapter 140 (Epilogue) was uploaded on September 29, 2020. It is also available in Chinese, Japanese, French, Indonesian, Spanish and Thai.

After the success of Sweet Home, Kim collaborated with webtoon illustrator Hongpil for its prequel titled Shotgun Boy which was released in Naver Webtoon starting February 22, 2021, with Hwang providing editorial supervision. The webtoon tells the story of the titular "shotgun [high school] boy" Han Kyu-hwan and the events prior to Sweet Home.

=== Print version ===
Print versions of Sweet Home from the prologue up to Chapter 105 were released on February 28, 2020 (volumes 1–3), October 15, 2020 (volumes 4–6) and April 29, 2021 (volumes 7–9), by Wisdom House.

==== Volume list ====
No.	Korean release date	Korean ISBN
1	February 28, 2020	979-1-19-063027-6
Prologue; Chapter 1 (제01화); Chapter 2 (제02화); Chapter 3 (제03화); Chapter 4 (제04화); Chapter 5 (제05화); Chapter 6 (제06화); Chapter 7 (제07화); Chapter 8 (제08화); Chapter 9 (제09화); Chapter 10 (제10화)
2	February 28, 2020	979-1-19-063028-3
Chapter 11 (제11화); Chapter 12 (제12화); Chapter 13 (제13화); Chapter 14 (제14화); Chapter 15 (제15화); Chapter 16 (제16화); Chapter 17 (제17화); Chapter 18 (제18화); Chapter 19 (제19화); Chapter 20 (제20화)
3	February 28, 2020	979-1-19-063029-0
Chapter 21 (제21화); Chapter 22 (제22화); Chapter 23 (제23화); Chapter 24 (제24화); Chapter 25 (제25화); Chapter 26 (제26화); Chapter 27 (제27화); Chapter 28 (제28화); Chapter 29 (제29화); Chapter 30 (제30화)
4	October 15, 2020	979-1-19-090889-4
Chapter 31 (제31화); Chapter 32 (제32화); Chapter 33 (제33화); Chapter 34 (제34화); Chapter 35 (제35화); Chapter 36 (제36화); Chapter 37 (제37화); Chapter 38 (제38화); Chapter 39 (제39화); Chapter 40 (제40화); Chapter 41 (제41화); Chapter 42 (제42화)
5	October 15, 2020	979-1-19-090890-0
Chapter 43 (제43화); Chapter 44 (제44화); Chapter 45 (제45화); Chapter 46 (제46화); Chapter 47 (제47화); Chapter 48 (제48화); Chapter 49 (제49화); Chapter 50 (제50화); Chapter 51 (제51화); Chapter 52 (제52화); Chapter 53 (제53화)
6	October 15, 2020	979-1-19-090891-7
Chapter 54 (제54화); Chapter 55 (제55화); Chapter 56 (제56화); Chapter 57 (제57화); Chapter 58 (제58화); Chapter 59 (제59화); Chapter 60 (제60화); Chapter 61 (제61화); Chapter 62 (제62화); Chapter 63 (제63화); Chapter 64 (제64화); Chapter 65 (제65화)
7	April 29, 2021	979-1-19-158300-7
Chapter 66 (제66화); Chapter 67 (제67화); Chapter 68 (제68화); Chapter 69 (제69화); Chapter 70 (제70화); Chapter 71 (제71화); Chapter 72 (제72화); Chapter 73 (제73화); Chapter 74 (제74화); Chapter 75 (제75화); Chapter 76 (제76화); Chapter 77 (제77화); Chapter 78 (제78화); Chapter 79 (제79화)
8	April 29, 2021	979-1-19-158308-3
Chapter 80 (제80화); Chapter 81 (제81화); Chapter 82 (제82화); Chapter 83 (제83화); Chapter 84 (제84화); Chapter 85 (제85화); Chapter 86 (제86화); Chapter 87 (제87화); Chapter 88 (제88화); Chapter 89 (제89화); Chapter 90 (제90화); Chapter 91 (제91화); Chapter 92 (제92화); Chapter 93 (제93화)
9	April 29, 2021	979-1-19-158309-0
Chapter 94 (제94화); Chapter 95 (제95화); Chapter 96 (제96화); Chapter 97 (제97화); Chapter 98 (제98화); Chapter 99 (제99화); Chapter 100 (제100화); Chapter 101 (제101화); Chapter 102 (제102화); Chapter 103 (제103화); Chapter 104 (제104화); Chapter 105 (제105화)
10	May 27, 2021	979-1-19-158335-9
Chapter 106 (제106화); Chapter 107 (제107화); Chapter 108 (제108화); Chapter 109 (제109화); Chapter 110 (제110화); Chapter 111 (제111화); Chapter 112 (제112화); Chapter 113 (제113화); Chapter 114 (제114화); Chapter 115 (제115화); Chapter 116 (제116화); Chapter 117 (제117화)
11	May 27, 2021	979-1-19-158336-6
Chapter 118 (제118화); Chapter 119 (제119화); Chapter 120 (제120화); Chapter 121 (제121화); Chapter 122 (제122화); Chapter 123 (제123화); Chapter 124 (제124화); Chapter 125 (제125화); Chapter 125 (제126화); Chapter 127 (제127화); Chapter 128 (제128화); Chapter 129 (제129화)
12	May 27, 2021	979-1-19-158337-3
Chapter 130 (제130화); Chapter 131 (제131화); Chapter 132 (제132화); Chapter 133 (제133화); Chapter 134 (제134화); Chapter 135 (제135화); Chapter 136 (제136화); Chapter 137 (제137화); Chapter 138 (제138화); Chapter 139 (제139화); Chapter 140 (제140화); Epilogue

== Reception ==
As of January 2021, the official English version of Sweet Home garnered 2.4 million subscribers and 15.2 million likes. The print version of the webtoon was also recognized by the Korea Manhwa Contents Agency (KOMACON) as one of the "50 Best Comic Books of 2020". ATK Magazine's Kate Maugans called the webtoon a "wild ride" and marked its "compelling story and intriguing art".

== Adaptations ==
Sweet Home has been adapted by Studio Dragon and Studio N into a Netflix series of the same name starring Song Kang, Lee Jin-wook and Lee Si-young who play Hyun-soo, Sang-wook and a new character Seo Yi-kyeong, respectively. Netflix officially announced the series' cast on December 18, 2019. Helmed by director Lee Eung-bok, the series was released on December 18, 2020, to mixed reviews.
