= Busan Foreign Language High School =

Private school in Busan, South Korea

- 부산외국어고등학교

Location
- St. Gobun 144 (Yeonsan-dong), Yeonjae-gu, Busan; South Korea

Information
- Other name: 釜山外國語高等學校
- School type: Private establishment/Coed school
- Motto: 생각하고 행동하는 사람이 되자, 큰 희망을 품고 꾸준히 노력하자 (Think and act. Continuous effort with great hope)
- Established: 1985
- Principal: Jongsun Lee
- Teaching staff: 62
- Website: school.busanedu.net/pfl-h/main.do

Busan Foreign Language High School (Korean: 부산외국어고등학교; Hanja: 釜山外國語高等學校) is a private foreign language high school that is located in Yeonsan-dong, Yeonsan-gu, Busan, South Korea.

== Majors ==
- English-Japanese major (class 1~3)
- English-French major (class 4~5)
- English-Deutsch major (class 6~7)
- English-Chinese major (class 8~10)

== Scholarship ==
Busan Foreign Language High School has three scholarship; one for freshmen, and two for enrolled students. The freshmen scholarship is recognized to ten students every year they matriculate. Two students each from French and Deutsche major, and three students each from Japanese and Chinese major; total of ten students with the highest placement test score receives the scholarship. Enrolled scholarship are divided into internal and external one. Internal test score scholarship is also recognized to ten students but many factors other than test score are considered. The external scholarship is a whole recommendation system. First two scholarship is 1,000,000 won. External scholarship differs by its kind.

== History ==
Busan Foreign Language High School was established on January 9, 1985. Dr. Yijoe Han inaugurated as the first chairman of the board. Gyucheol Lee assumed the position of the inaugural principal on March 1, 1985, coinciding with the school's opening and matriculation ceremony on March 7, 1985.

The school building was completed on March 2, 1986, and the first graduation ceremony took place on February 11, 1988. Subsequent expansions occurred with the building expansion finalized on February 28, 1989, and the school obtaining special-purpose high school status on September 17, 1991.

Dr. Seungwan Han became the third chairman of the board on April 22, 2015, and Jongsun Lee assumed the role of the 10th principal on March 1, 2017. The 32nd graduation ceremony on February 12, 2019, marked a milestone with 229 students graduating, bringing the cumulative total to 13,600. The 35th matriculation ceremony on March 4, 2019, welcomed 237 new students.

== Notable alumni ==
- Park Gyu-young, actress
- Park Joon-hyung, comedian
- Seo Ji-yu, artist
