= Poong, the Joseon Psychiatrist =

2022 South Korean television series

- Promotional poster
- Hangul: 조선 정신과 의사 유세풍
- Hanja: 朝鮮 精神科 醫師 劉世豐
- Lit.: Joseon Psychiatrist Yoo Se-poong
- RR: Joseon jeongsingwa uisa Yu Sepung
- MR: Chosŏn chŏngsinkwa ŭisa Yu Sep'ung
- Genre: Historical; Medical; Comedy; Romance
- Created by: Studio Dragon
- Based on: Joseon Psychiatrist Yoo Se-poong by Lee Eun-so
- Written by: Park Seul-gi; Choi Min-ho; Lee Bom
- Directed by: Park Won-guk
- Starring: Kim Min-jae; Kim Hyang-gi; Kim Sang-kyung
- Music by: Moon Seung-nam
- Country of origin: South Korea
- Original language: Korean
- No. of seasons: 2
- No. of episodes: 22

Production
- Executive producer: Yoo Sang-won
- Producers: Son Ja-young; Kim Ha-kyung
- Running time: 60 minutes
- Production companies: Media Can; Ilchwoljang

Original release
- Network: tvN
- Release: August 1, 2022 – February 9, 2023

Poong, the Joseon Psychiatrist (Korean: 조선 정신과 의사 유세풍) is a South Korean television series broadcast by tvN, starring Kim Min-jae in the title role, along with Kim Hyang-gi and Kim Sang-kyung. Based on the novel of the same title that won the Excellence Award in the 2016 Korea Story Contest, it depicts the stories of psychiatrists in Joseon. The first season aired from August to September 2022 with a total of 12 episodes. The second season aired from January to February 2023 with a total of 10 episodes. It is also available for streaming on Viu in selected regions.

== Series overview ==
Season	Episodes	Originally released		Time slot	Avg. viewership (thousands)
Season	Episodes	First released	Last released	Time slot	Avg. viewership (thousands)
1	12	August 1, 2022	September 6, 2022	Monday–Tuesday at 22:30 (KST)	1090
2	10	January 11, 2023	February 9, 2023	Wednesday–Thursday at 22:30 (KST)	576

== Synopsis ==
Yoo Se-yeop (Kim Min-jae) is a genius physician for the royal family, but is expelled from the capital after falling victim to a conspiracy. He later meets an eccentric teacher, Gye Ji-han (Kim Sang-kyung), and a widow, Seo Eun-woo (Kim Hyang-gi), in the mysterious and beautiful Gyesu Village. He is reborn as a true doctor who aims to heal people's hearts, writing the prescription of happiness.

== Cast ==
=== Main ===
- Kim Min-jae as Yoo Se-yeop / Yoo Se-poong

Born to a noble family, he becomes the head acupuncturist of the palace. When the King dies after he performs acupuncture on him, he is expelled from the palace and his father is murdered. Traumatised by these events, he can no longer practice acupuncture and cannot sleep because of nightmares. After wandering around for a year, he arrives at Gyesu Village, where he gains the nickname Poong.

- Kim Hyang-gi as Seo Eun-woo

A young widow who listens to the stories of those who are sick. She is the daughter of the magistrate of Sorak. Following her husband's death on her wedding day, she was constantly bullied by her in-laws, who attempt to enforce her to suicide (multiple times), so that the family will reap the rewards of her being declared a virtuous woman (Yeolnyeo). After being freed from her in-laws, she starts learning medicine at Gyesu Clinic in order to become a female physician.

- Kim Sang-kyung as Gye Ji-han

The head of Gyesu Clinic. A geeky doctor and Yoo Se-poong's 'outside-of-the-box' teacher. Though he appears to be greedy for money, he is a warm-hearted person who helps those in need.

=== Supporting ===
Gyesu Village

- Ahn Chang-hwan as Man-bok

Yoo Se-poong's loyal servant who stays with him after his expulsion from the capital. Together they relocate to Gyesu Village after wandering around the countryside for a year.

- Jeon Guk-hyang as 'Grandmother'

An old woman with dementia who mistakes Yoo Se-yeop for her son, Poong.

- Yeon Bora as Nam-hae

The housekeeper and cook of Gyesu Clinic.

- Kim Su-an as Ip-bun

Gye Ji-han's daughter.

- Han Chang-min as Jang-goon

An autistic boy in charge of the medicine warehouse of Gyesu Clinic.

Royal Court

- Yoo Sung-joo as Cho Tae-hak

The Left State Councillor. He controls the court and moves Joseon behind the king.

- Lee Seo-hwan as Shin Gwi-soo

An ambitious physician in the royal court.

- Oh Kyung-joo as the Crown Prince

The Crown Prince, who becomes the King following his father's death. He has a close relationship with Yoo Se-poong.

- Kang Young-seok as Jeon Kang-il

An inspector who comes to inspect the county council.

- Woo Da-vi as Lee Seo-yi

A royal princess and King's half-sister.

- Jang Sun as Court Lady Jung

A court lady who serves princess Lee Seo-yi.

Sorak County

- Jung Won-chang as Cho Shin-woo

A Royal Inspector who grew up in Sorak, and the adopted son of Cho Tae-hak.

- Kim Hak-sun as Seo Hyun-ryeong

The magistrate of Sorak, and Seo Eun-woo's father.

- Kim Hyung-Mook as Im Soon-man

A greedy nobleman in Sorak.

Others

- Jung Min-ah as Queen
- Baek Sung-cheol as Ahn Hak-soo

Sorak's new governor

=== Special appearances ===
- Ahn Nae-sang as the King
- Jang Hyun-sung as Minister Yoo Hoo-myung

Yoo Se-poong's father.

- Oh Dae-hwan as a palace physician
- Yoon Byung-hee as a tightrope-walker
- Kim Joo-ryoung as Seo Eun-woo's mother-in-law
- Go Geon-han as Lee Ho-jun

Seo Eun-woo's brother-in-law.

- Lee Sang-yi as Kim Yun-gyeom

The son of Grandmother.

- Jang Hee-ryung as Hyo-yeon

A noble lady.

- Baek Seok-kwang as Gil-su

Hyo-yeon's fiancé.

- Moon Yong-il as Gaeban

Hyo-yeon's servant.

- Lee Ji-ha as Lord Jo's wife
- Oh Han-gyeol as Seok-cheol

The illegitimate son of Lord Jo.

- Son Jong-hak as Lord Jo

Seok-cheol's father.

- Jung Ye-bin as Seok-cheol's mother and Lord Jo's concubine
- Kim Han-na as Jang Yoo-jeong

A bookstore owner's daughter who married a poor nobleman.

- Ahn Sang-woo as Jang Yoo-jeong's husband
- Ji-eun as Heo

A woman involved with Jang Yoo-jeong's husband.

- Park Jae-wan as Jeon Kyu-hyung

A teacher who was killed in the past

- Lee Kyu-hyun as Moo-yeong

A herbalist and Yeon-hwa's lover.

- Jeon Hye-yeon as Yeon-hwa

A noble lady and Moo-yeong's lover.

- Park Si-hyun as Heo

The wife of nobleman Choi Jam-pan.

- Park Se-hyun as Wol

A court lady from the Royal Kitchen.

- Lee Min-ji as Deok-hee

A court lady

- Choi Jae-seop as Eunuch Yun

The King's aide.

- Choi Ji-soo as Jeong-soon

An officer who works at a paper mill and a bully in So-cheon.

- Lee Ga-eun as So-cheon

An officer who works on a paper mill.

- Jo Soo-ha as Chun-wol

The courtesan of Mohwagak.

== Production ==
On March 31, 2022, a bus carrying the production staff of Poong, the Joseon Psychiatrist was involved in a collision. A PD from the directing department was killed, and ten others were injured in the accident. Filming of the drama was halted. On May 11, 2022, the production company announced that the drama had resumed filming the previous week.

== Original soundtrack ==
=== Part 1 ===
Released on August 2, 2022
No.	Title	Lyrics	Music	Artist	Length
1.	"By Your Side" (사랑스런 너의 곁에)	Humbler; Kim Ah-hyun	Humbler	Solji (EXID)	3:52
2.	"By Your Side" (사랑스런 너의 곁에; Inst.)		Humbler		3:52
Total length:					7:44

=== Part 2 ===
Released on August 9, 2022
No.	Title	Lyrics	Music	Artist	Length
1.	"I Guess I Like You" (그댈 많이 좋아하는가 봐요)	Ahn Da-eun	Han Kyung-soo; Lee Do-hyung	Hello Ga-young	3:29
2.	"I Guess I Like You" (그댈 많이 좋아하는가 봐요; Inst.)		Han Kyung-soo; Lee Do-hyung		3:29
Total length:					6:58

== Viewership ==
Poong, the Joseon Psychiatrist : South Korea viewers per episode (thousands)

Season	Episode number												Average
Season	1	2	3	4	5	6	7	8	9	10	11	12	Average
1	847	1118	1016	1189	1218	1175	1071	1149	1022	1121	1028	1124	1090
2	783	602	725	506	737	462	550	407	498	490	–		576

Source: Audience measurement performed nationwide by Nielsen Korea.

Average TV viewership ratings (season 1)
Ep.	Original broadcast date	Average audience share (Nielsen Korea)	
Ep.	Original broadcast date	Nationwide	Seoul
1	August 1, 2022	3.864% (1st)	3.720% (1st)
2	August 2, 2022	5.062% (1st)	4.679% (1st)
3	August 8, 2022	4.321% (1st)	4.817% (1st)
4	August 9, 2022	5.059% (1st)	4.449% (1st)
5	August 15, 2022	5.127% (1st)	4.915% (1st)
6	August 16, 2022	4.973% (1st)	4.683% (1st)
7	August 22, 2022	4.652% (1st)	4.575% (1st)
8	August 23, 2022	4.749% (1st)	4.354% (2nd)
9	August 29, 2022	4.456% (1st)	4.663% (1st)
10	August 30, 2022	5.180% (1st)	4.718% (1st)
11	September 5, 2022	4.323% (1st)	4.227% (1st)
12	September 6, 2022	5.099% (1st)	5.356% (1st)
Average		4.739%	4.596%
In the table above, the blue numbers represent the lowest published ratings and the red numbers represent the highest published ratings.; This drama aired on a cable channel/pay TV which normally has a relatively smaller audience compared to free-to-air TV/public broadcasters (KBS, SBS, MBC and EBS).

Average TV viewership ratings (season 2)
Ep.	Original broadcast date	Average audience share (Nielsen Korea)	
Ep.	Original broadcast date	Nationwide	Seoul
1	January 11, 2023	3.682% (2nd)	3.562% (2nd)
2	January 12, 2023	2.533% (2nd)	2.999% (2nd)
3	January 18, 2023	3.261% (2nd)	3.747% (2nd)
4	January 19, 2023	2.275% (2nd)	2.171% (2nd)
5	January 25, 2023	3.179% (2nd)	3.470% (2nd)
6	January 26, 2023	1.917% (2nd)	1.947% (2nd)
7	February 1, 2023	2.446% (3rd)	2.712% (3rd)
8	February 2, 2023	1.827% (2nd)	2.077% (3rd)
9	February 8, 2023	2.443% (3rd)	2.440% (3rd)
10	February 9, 2023	2.388% (1st)	2.599% (1st)
Average		2.595%	2.772%
In the table above, the blue numbers represent the lowest published ratings and the red numbers represent the highest published ratings.; This drama aired on a cable channel/pay TV which normally has a relatively smaller audience compared to free-to-air TV/public broadcasters (KBS, SBS, MBC and EBS).
