= Wretches =

- Theatrical poster
- Hangul: 괴물들
- Lit.: Monsters
- RR: Goemuldeul
- MR: Koemuldŭl
- Directed by: Kim Baek-jun
- Written by: Kim Baek-jun
- Produced by: Han Jae-hoon
- Starring: Lee Won-keun; Lee Yi-kyung; Park Gyu-young
- Music by: Lim Min-ju
- Production company: Flow6
- Distributed by: Little Big Pictures
- Release date: March 8, 2018
- Running time: 102 minutes
- Country: South Korea
- Language: Korean
- Box office: US$25,951

Wretches (Korean: 괴물들; RR: Goemuldeul) is a 2018 South Korean drama film written and directed by Kim Baek-jun.

== Synopsis ==
The movie begins with someone entering the school after hours, tampering a student locker. The most powerful student at a school is hospitalized after drinking a drink from the locker which has been poisoned. Yang-Hoon (Lee Yi-Kyung) then takes over his #1 position at school. Yang-Hoon harasses Jae-Young (Lee Won-Geun), and it gets worse. One day, Yang-Hoon, who has a crush on Bo-Young (Park Gyu-Young), gets Jae-Young to follow her. He follows her, but she disappears from his sight. He calls Hoon to inform her, and Hoon calls him to a PC cafe to bully him for it. He threatens her that if he doesn't find her address by tomorrow, he will burn him with cigarettes. So he tries the next day again and succeeds this time, but now HOOn asks him to get her home lock's password, but Jae Young discovers her house still uses a lock & key mechanism. Jae Young, being scared, sends his own house's password and lock photo to Hoon, pretending to be hers. But now Hoon asks him to get her panties as proof that the lock is her house's only and he is not trying to scam him. Jae Young then breaks into her house, but her parents come home before he can take any photos of hers from her yearbook album or her panties. He somehow manages to go out of her house. The next day, he meets up with Ye Ri, who is a worker in a cafe that he frequently visits or volunteers at. She is a bit mentally unstable or has Down syndrome. However, she looks exactly like Bo Young. Hoon somehow gets to know about this and misunderstands that Jae Young was trying to hit on Bo Young and humiliates him in front of his entire class by scribling on his back with markers and writing "trash, scum." Contemplating about everything, Jae Young goes and tells Hoon & shows him the pictures of Ye Ri and says that she was actually a different person, but he is ready to introduce him to her if he assures him that he will stop bullying him from now on, for which Hoon agrees.

== Cast ==
- Lee Won-keun as Jo Jae-young
- Lee Yi-kyung as Yang-hun
- Kim Jong-hoon as yong kyu
- Park Gyu-young as Ye-ri / Bo-kyung
- Oh Seung-hoon as Sang-cheol
- Chae Sang-woo as Seong-woo
- Chu Kwi-jung as Jae-young's mother
- Kim Sung-kyun as Inspector Kang (special appearance)
- Kim Ho-jung as Ye-ri's mother (special appearance)

== Release ==
In South Korea, the film was given a restricted rating by the Korea Media Rating Board.
