= Dali & Cocky Prince =

2021 South Korean television series

- Promotional poster
- Also known as: Dali and Cocky Prince
- Hangul: 달리와 감자탕
- Lit.: Dali and Gamja-tang
- RR: Dalriwa gamjatang
- MR: Talliwa kamjat'ang
- Genre: Romantic comedy
- Created by: Hong Seok-gu; KBS Drama Division
- Written by: Son Eun-hye; Park Se-eun
- Directed by: Lee Jung-seob
- Starring: Kim Min-jae; Park Gyu-young; Kwon Yul; Hwang Hee; Yeonwoo
- Composer: Choi In-hee
- Country of origin: South Korea
- Original language: Korean
- No. of episodes: 16

Production
- Executive producer: Ki Min-soo (KBS)
- Producers: Hwang Eui-kyung; Oh Young-seop; Cho Jeong-eun; Park Jin-hyung
- Running time: 70 minutes
- Production companies: Monster Union; Copus Korea

Original release
- Network: KBS2
- Release: September 22 – November 11, 2021

Dali & Cocky Prince (Korean: 달리와 감자탕) is a 2021 South Korean television series starring Kim Min-jae, Park Gyu-young, Kwon Yul, Hwang Hee, and Yeonwoo. It is about the romance between a parvenu who lacks education, and the daughter of a prestigious family who tries to save a collapsed art museum. It aired on KBS2 from September 22 to November 11, 2021.

== Synopsis ==
Visiting researcher Kim Dali meets restaurateur Jin Moo-hak in a case of mistaken identity in the Netherlands. When her father dies, Dali returns home to take over management of her family's struggling art museum. Moo-hak is a major creditor of the art museum, and they meet again unexpectedly when he arrives to collect his debts. Gradually, Moo-hak realizes that he wants to turn the museum's fortunes around to help Dali rather than solely get his money back.

== Cast ==
=== Main ===
- Kim Min-jae as Jin Moo-hak, the director of Dondon F&B, a company that started as a small gamja-tang restaurant and has grown into a global food service company with more than 400 franchise stores. He has natural sense of talking skills, trade, and money.
- Park Gyu-young as Kim Dali, a visiting researcher at Saint Müller Museum who later becomes the director of Cheong-song Art Museum. She is well-versed in various fields, fluent in seven languages and has a good personality, but lacks skills in household chores – including cooking.
- Kwon Yul as Jang Tae-jin, Dali's first love who is the head of Century Group's planning and coordination team.
- Hwang Hee as Joo Won-tak, a detective from the violent crime squad who was supported by Dali's father.
- Yeonwoo as Ahn Chak-hee, a gallerist and the daughter of a National Assembly member.

=== Supporting ===
==== People in the art museum ====
- Jang Gwang as Kim Nak-cheon, Dali's father who is the director of Cheong-song Art Museum.
- Woo Hee-jin as Song Sa-bong, a curator at Cheong-song Art Museum.
- Ahn Se-ha as Han Byung-se, an elite curator at Cheong-song Art Museum.
- Yoo Hyung-gwan as Hwang Gi-dong, facility management department engineer.
- Song Ji-won as Na Gong-joo, an intern at the art museum.
- Lee Jae-woo as Kim Si-hyung, Nak-cheon's nephew.

==== People around Moo-hak ====
- Ahn Gil-kang as Jin Baek-won, Moo-hak's father who is the chairman of Dondon F&B.
- Seo Jeong-yeon as So Geum-ja, Moo-hak's stepmother and Baek-won's wife.
- Lee Je-yeon as Jin Ki-cheol, Moo-hak's stepbrother and the head of Dondon F&B's planning department.
- Hwang Bo-ra as Yeo Mi-ri, Moo-hak's secretary.

=== Special appearances ===
- Jeong Kyu-soo
- Hong Seok-cheon as Chef Hong Seok-cheon (Ep. 1)
- Park Sang-myun as Ahn Sang-tae

== Production and release ==
The male lead role was first offered to actor Lee Jae-wook.

Filming was scheduled to begin in April 2021. The series was originally scheduled to be aired between November and December 2021, but KBS decided to premiere it earlier.

== Original soundtrack ==
Dali & Cocky Prince (KBS 2TV Wed-Thu Drama) OST

Compilation album by Various Artist
- Released: November 16, 2021
- Genre: Soundtrack
- Languages: Korean; English
- Label: Stone Music Entertainment

Singles from Dali & Cocky Prince
- 1. ""The Sweetest Love" (내 옆에는 너만 있었으면 해)" Released: September 23, 2021; 2. "직진" Released: September 30, 2021; 3. ""That's Ordinary Love"" Released: October 6, 2021; 4. ""With You" (이상하죠)" Released: October 7, 2021; 5. ""Can't You Love Me?" (사랑할 순 없는지)" Released: October 14, 2021; 6. "U Hoo Hoo" Released: October 21, 2021; 7. ""Moon Crater" (달 크레이터)" Released: October 27, 2021; 8. "Gift" Released: November 3, 2021; 9. "Gift (Eng Ver.)" Released: November 3, 2021; 10. ""Kiss" (연인 (키스))" Released: November 10, 2021; 11. ""One Day It Will Be"" Released: November 10, 2021

Disc 1
No.	Title	Artist	Length
1.	"The Sweetest Love" (내 옆에는 너만 있었으면 해)	Ham Yeon-ji	2:52
2.	"Straight" (직진)	Dindin	3:07
3.	"That's Ordinary Love"	Seoho	2:23
4.	"With You" (이상하죠)	Ha Hyun-sang	4:01
5.	"Can't You Love Me?" (사랑할 순 없는지)	Fromm	4:25
6.	"U Hoo Hoo"	Klang	3:20
7.	"Moon Crater" (달 크레이터)	Kim Ye-ji	3:49
8.	"Gift"	Chai	3:38
9.	"The Kiss" (연인 (키스))	Hodge	2:36
10.	"One Day It Will Be"	Ian Hug, Seoho	2:38
11.	"Can't You Love Me? (Piano ver.)" (사랑할 순 없는지 Piano Ver.)	Fromm	4:32
12.	"U Hoo Hoo" (Piano Ver.)	Klang	3:17
13.	"Gift" (Eng Ver.)	Chai	3:18
Total length:			43:56

Disc 2
No.	Title	Artist	Length
1.	"Musee d' Dali (open 09:22)"	Ham Yon-ji	0:45
2.	"Flowers and Cat" (황묘농접)	Choi In-hee, Oh Hye-joo	2:36
3.	"Birthday"	Choi In-hee, Oh Hye-joo	2:00
4.	"Moona Lisa" (無나리자)	Choi In-hee, Lee So-ri	2:16
5.	"Mr. Three Moo's" (無나리자)	Choi In-hee, Ahn Ji-hoon	2:36
6.	"Born to be Glamorous!" (본투비 귀티!)	Choi In-hee, Oh Hye-joo	2:01
7.	"Dal Moo Couple" (달무커플)	Choi In-hee, Lee So-ri	2:53
8.	"The Three Candles" (Vocal Fromm)	Choi In-hee, Oh Hye-joo	3:20
9.	"Shadow of Villain"	Choi In-hee, Oh Hye-joo	3:00
10.	"What the Heck?!" (X 싸고 있네!)	Kim Hyun-joo	1:49
11.	"Creditor vs. Debtor" (채권자vs채무자)	Choi In-hee, Lee So-ri	2:20
12.	"Born to be Cost-effective" (본투비 가성비)	Choi In-hee, Lee So-ri	1:59
13.	"The Scream"	Kim Moon-jung	2:00
14.	"Oops! Modigliani" (뭐!딜리아니)	Choi In-hee, Lee So-ri	1:36
15.	"The Persistence of Memory" (기억의 지속)	Kim Hyun-joo	4:00
16.	"My Two Billion" (내 돈 20억)	Choi In-hee, Lee So-ri	2:33
17.	"The Beethoven Freze"	Choi In-hee, Oh Hye-joo	3:00
18.	"The Cyclops"	Choi In-hee, Lee So-ri	4:06
19.	"The Starry Night" (별이 빛나는 밤)	Choi In-hee, Oh Hye-joo	2:37
20.	"Musee d' Dali (Closed 11:10)" (Narr. Dali & Moohak)	Choi In-hee, Oh Hye-joo	0:45
Total length:			48:12

== Viewership ==
Dali & Cocky Prince : South Korea viewers per episode (thousands)

Season	Episode number															
Season	1	2	3	4	5	6	7	8	9	10	11	12	13	14	15	16
1	N/A	682	790	911	762	882	897	809	799	794	792	849	828	823	864	861

Source: Audience measurement performed nationwide by Nielsen Korea.

Ep.	Original broadcast date	Average audience share		
Ep.	Original broadcast date	Nielsen Korea		TNmS
Ep.	Original broadcast date	Nationwide	Seoul	Nationwide
1	September 22, 2021	4.4% (N/A)	4.9% (18th)	N/A
2	September 23, 2021	4.3% (16th)	4.5% (15th)	N/A
3	September 29, 2021	5.1% (18th)	4.8% (18th)	N/A
4	September 30, 2021	5.3% (11th)	5.4% (12th)	N/A
5	October 6, 2021	5.1% (14th)	5.0% (17th)	4.2% (20th)
6	October 7, 2021	5.4% (11th)	5.5% (11th)	4.6% (14th)
7	October 13, 2021	5.3% (14th)	5.4% (11th)	4.5% (18th)
8	October 14, 2021	5.2% (12th)	5.3% (12th)	4.6% (14th)
9	October 20, 2021	5.2% (13th)	5.4% (13th)	4.1% (18th)
10	October 21, 2021	4.9% (15th)	4.9% (14th)	4.5% (18th)
11	October 27, 2021	4.9% (15th)	5.1% (15th)	4.8% (17th)
12	October 28, 2021	5.4% (11th)	5.6% (10th)	4.6% (14th)
13	November 3, 2021	5.1% (16th)	4.8% (16th)	4.8% (15th)
14	November 4, 2021	5.0% (13th)	5.1% (13th)	4.3% (16th)
15	November 10, 2021	5.3% (15th)	5.5% (13th)	4.2% (17th)
16	November 11, 2021	5.7% (12th)	5.7% (10th)	4.1% (20th)
Average		5.1%	5.2%	— (Note: Due to some unpublished ratings, the exact average rating is unknown.)
In the table above, the blue numbers represent the lowest ratings and the red numbers represent the highest ratings.; N/A denotes that the rating/ranking is not known.
