= Sweet Home (TV series) =

South Korean horror series

- Also known as: Sweet Home 2; Sweet Home 3
- Hangul: 스위트홈
- RR: Seuwiteuhom
- MR: Sŭwit'ŭhom
- Genre: Apocalyptic horror-action
- Based on: Sweet Home by: Kim Carnby; Hwang Young-chan
- Written by: Hong So-ri; Kim Hyung-min; Park So-jung
- Directed by: Lee Eung-bok; Jang Young-woo (season 1); Park So-hyun
- Creative director: Kim Seol-jin
- Starring: Song Kang; Lee Jin-wook; Lee Si-young
- Music by: Gaemi (season 1); Nam Hye-seung (season 2)
- Country of origin: South Korea
- Original language: Korean
- No. of seasons: 3
- No. of episodes: 26

Production
- Executive producers: Park Ju-yeon (CP); Kim Young-kyu
- Producers: Choi Jin-hee (season 1); Kim Jae-hyun (season 2); Yoo Sang-won (season 2)
- Editor: Kim Woo-seok
- Camera setup: Single camera
- Running time: 44–60 minutes
- Production companies: Studio Dragon; Studio N
- Budget: ₩30 billion

Original release
- Network: Netflix
- Release: December 18, 2020 – July 19, 2024

Sweet Home (Korean: 스위트홈) is a 2020 South Korean apocalyptic horror television series starring Song Kang, Lee Jin-wook, and Lee Si-young. It is based on the Naver webtoon of the same name by Kim Carnby and Hwang Young-chan, which recorded over 2.1 billion net views.

The first season was released on Netflix on December 18, 2020. The second season was released on December 1, 2023. The third and final season was released on July 19, 2024.

== Synopsis ==
=== Season 1 ===
After an unexpected tragedy kills his entire family and leaves him as the only survivor, Cha Hyun-su leaves his family home and relocates into the run down apartment complex known as Green Home. One night, horrific monsters begin appearing and ravage the city. Hyun-su and some of his fellow residents band together within the confines of the complex and must fight for their survival against the new, preternatural threat, while others from the apartment turn into monsters based on the things they desire. Hyun-su starts having monster symptoms and develops the ability to turn into a winged monster whenever he desires.

=== Season 2 ===
The survivors of Green Home venture out into the ruined world beyond its walls. Meanwhile, governmental bodies and scientific institutions continue in their efforts to study the monsters, hoping to find a cure.

=== Season 3 ===
The survivors continue to face new threats and challenges as they explore deeper into the characters' backgrounds and the origins of the monsters. Cha Hyun-su grapples with his monstrous transformation abilities, playing a pivotal role in defending the survivors and uncovering the mysteries behind the monstrous outbreaks. New and more dangerous monster types are introduced, including human-like creatures emerging from cocoons. Yi-kyung's child, possessing special powers, becomes a significant part of the story. Lee Eun-hyuk returns as a neohuman, forming an alliance with Hyun-su. Efforts by governmental and scientific bodies to understand and possibly cure the monstrous transformations continue, adding another layer of intrigue and hope for the characters.

== Cast ==
=== Seasons 1–3 ===
Actor	Character	Seasons	Summary
Song Kang	Cha Hyun-su	1-3	A clinically depressed high school dropout who moves into Green Home after his family is killed in a car accident. He becomes a monster-human hybrid, gaining regenerative abilities and a monster wing for an arm. He's the archenemy of Jung Ui-myeong.
Lee Jin-wook	Pyeon Sang-wook	1-3	A mysterious contract killer with severe burn scars on his face after his father's death. He pursues Choi Yoon-jae throughout the first half of the first season, and becomes a trusted ally to the residents. He is then possessed through the rest of the series.
Lee Eugene	young Pyeon Sang-wook	1–3	A mysterious contract killer with severe burn scars on his face after his father's death. He pursues Choi Yoon-jae throughout the first half of the first season, and becomes a trusted ally to the residents. He is then possessed through the rest of the series.
Lee Si-young	Seo Yi-kyung	1-3	A former firefighter whose fiancé, Nam Sang-won, mysteriously disappeared two days before their wedding. She is also a skilled martial artist and gunman, having served in the special force. She has a monster child named Seo Yi-su. Si-young's character is exclusive to the television series, not appearing in the webtoon comic.
Lee Do-hyun	Lee Eun-hyeok	1-3	Eun-yu's adoptive older brother and a former medical student. Leading with a composed mind and logical decisions, he becomes the de facto leader of the residents, though many view him as cold and distant.
Park Gyu-young	Yoon Ji-su	1-2	A troubled bass guitarist who moves into Green Home after her boyfriend's suicide. She is skilled with a baseball bat and also plays the acoustic guitar. She's the former rival of Eun-yu.
Go Min-si	Lee Eun-yu	1-3	Eun-hyuk's haughty adoptive younger sister and an aspiring ballerina who quit due to an injury on her foot.
Kim Hee-jung	Cha Jin-ok	1-3	A desperate mother searching for her missing daughter, Min-joo and the director of the daycare center.
Kim Gook-hee	Son Hye-in	1-2	A middle-aged woman who enjoys gossiping and owns a pet Pomeranian named Bom.
Lee Joon-woo	Ryu Jae-hwan	1-2	A young, aspiring model. He is deeply frustrated by the apocalypse, which has stopped him from maintaining his personal hygiene.
Heo Yool	Kim Su-yeong	1-2	A 9-year-old orphan and Yeong-su's older sister whose father was killed whilst climbing down the Green Home building.
Choi Go	Kim Yeong-su	1-3	A 6-year-old orphan and Su-yeong's younger brother who befriends Seo Yi-su in season 2 and 3.
Woo Jung-kook	Kang Seung-wan	1-2	A bespectacled and timid resident.

=== Season 1 ===
- Kim Nam-hee as Jung Jae-heon, a Korean-language teacher and devout Christian armed with a jingum, a traditional Korean sword, to protect himself, Ji-su, Du-sik and others. He's skilled with a sword. He struggles with alcoholism, relapsing due to the events unfolding in the series.
- Kim Sang-ho as Han Du-sik, Hyun-su's disabled neighbor and a skilled blacksmith who supplies the residents with weapons and defenses.
- Kim Hyun as An Seon-yeong, Kim Seok-hyeon's timid but kindhearted wife.
- Woo Hyun as Kim Seok-hyeon, a convenience store owner notorious for his short temper and abusive treatment of his wife.
- Go Youn-jung as Park Yu-ri, Gil-seob's caregiver who has medical training and asthma.
- Kim Kap-soo as An Gil-seob, a terminally-ill senior living with his caregiver Yu-ri. He serves as an inspiration to others, having surpassed the life expectancy of his unnamed disease.
- Lim Soo-hyung as No Byeong-il, a humorous resident and friend of Seok-hyeon who tends to be a man of action to protect his friends.
- Lee Bong-ryun as Im Myung-sook, a resident who has developed psychosis after having lost her infant daughter after her stroller rolled away and collided with a truck.
- Go Geon-han as Choi Yoon-jae, a resident who is viciously hunted by Sang-wook throughout the series due to being a child predator.
- Ahn Do-gyu as Kim Do-hun, Hyun-su's school bully whose father is the boss of Hyun-su's father.
- Kim Sung-cheol as Jung Ui-myeong, who was a researcher and monster-human hybrid who was part of a group of outlaws. He intends to find more infectees like him in order to dominate humanity. He is the archenemy of Hyun-su.
- Ahn Dong-goo as Lee Su-ung, a young military soldier living in Green Home and a good friend of Yi-kyung.
- Park Jin-soo as Park Min-joo
- Jeong Ha-dam as Kim Ji-eun, Hye-in's neighbor and friend.
- Kim Ji-eun as Han Yoo-jin, a military sergeant who negotiates with Yi-kyung about Green Home and Nam Sang-won.
- Lee Ji-ha as Moon Hyeon-suk, Hyun-su's mother.
- Kim Yi-kyung as Cha Soo-ah, Hyun-su's younger sister.
- Lee Ki-hyuk as Hwang Seung-jae, the arsonist behind the fire that killed Sang-wook's father and left Sang-wook with burn scars.
- Yoon Ji-on as Hae-rang, Yoon Ji-su's deceased boyfriend.
- Ham Sung-min as Park Ju-yeong, Hyun-su's classmate and fellow victim of bullying by Kim Do-hun.
- Park Ah-in as the Hyun-su's unnamed neighbor, who transforms into the "glutton" monster after continuously losing weight. She taunts Ji-su and later killed by Sang-wook.
- Dane DiLiegro as the "Protein" Monster
- Lee Shin-sung as Nam Sang-won, Yi-kyung's fiancé and scientist who becomes a monster who possessed Ui-myeong and Sang-wook throughout season 2 and 3.

=== Season 2 ===
- Yu Oh-seong as Master Sergeant Tak In-hwan, leader of the Special Forces and the commander of the Guard Corps, also known as "Crow Platoon".
- Oh Jung-se as Dr. Lim, a researcher of vaccines and Nam Sang-won's friend.
- Kim Mu-yeol as Sergeant First Class Kim Young-hoo, a UDT/SEAL, and the second-in-command of the Guard Corps.
- Jung Jin-young as Private Park Chan-young, a former baseball player and soldier in the Guard Corps.
- Kim Shin-rok as Chief Ji, the general manager of facility management.
- Kim Dong-young as Oh Jun-il, a new stadium resident.
- Yoon Se-ah as Bong Seon-hwa, the wife of Father Peter and daughter of Chief Ji.
- Byun Jung-hee as Oh Jun-il's mother.
- Yang Hye-ji as Jung Ye-seul, Chief Ji's daughter.
- Kim Si-a as Seo Yi-su, Seo Yi-kyung's mutant child
  - Ki So-yu as the young version of Seo Yi-kyung's mutant child.
- Hyun Bong-sik as Wang Ho-sang, a street survivor, with a shotgun.
- Chae Won-bin as Ha-ni, a street survivor with Wang Ho-sang.
- Kim Jung-woo as Father Peter
- Hong Su-zu as Jin-a
- Jung Suk-won as Gunnery Sergeant Min Seo-jin, a Marine Recon in the Guard Corps.
- Yook Jun-seo as Staff Sergeant Bang Jin-ho, a Special Forces soldier in the Guard Corps.
- Heo Nam-jun as Staff Sergeant Kang Seok-chan, a UDT/SEAL in the Guard Corps.
- Jeong Jong-hyun as Staff Sergeant Jeong Jong-hyun, a UDT/SEAL in the Guard Corps.

== Episodes ==
Season	Episodes	Originally released
1	10	December 18, 2020
2	8	December 1, 2023
3	8	July 19, 2024

=== Season 1 ===
No. overall	Episode	Directed by	Written by	Original release date
1	1	Lee Eung-bok, Jang Young-woo & Park So-hyun	Hong So-ri, Kim Hyung-min & Park So-jung	December 18, 2020
In September 2020, Cha Hyun-su is a soldiers' target in what appears to be a no-man's land. A month earlier, he moved into Green Home, an apartment complex inhabited by a diverse group of residents. Depressed and suicidal, Hyun-su isolates himself and relies on food deliveries. One night, he witnesses his neighbor eating her pet cat after stealing his delivery. Horrified, he rushes back to his apartment, but she follows, transforming into a ravenous "glutton" monster. The monster attacks another resident, Yoon Ji-su, before leaping out a window. Meanwhile, a blood-sucking "vampire" monster attacks a group of residents on the ground floor, killing one of them. Lee Eun-hyuk and former firefighter Seo Yi-kyung drive the monster outside and seal the entrance. Much to the residents' horror, they find the city overrun by other monstrous beings.
2	2	Lee Eung-bok, Jang Young-woo & Park So-hyun	Hong So-ri, Kim Hyung-min & Park So-jung	December 18, 2020
Flashbacks show Hyun-su's family's last moments before a fatal car crash, leaving him as the only survivor. In the present, Hyun-su learns online that nosebleeds and auditory hallucinations signal the onset of becoming a monster. Meanwhile, Ji-su and Jung Jae-heon evade a blind "lotus root" monster and rescue Choi Yoon-jae, who was attacked and tied up by a burglar. The burglar, Pyeon Sang-wook, kills the glutton monster but is bitten. Fearing infection, the residents on the ground floor restrain him, but he escapes. Hyun-su rescues orphaned siblings Kim Su-yeong and Kim Yeong-su from an "eyeball" monster, and the three are saved by Hyun-su's neighbor, Han Du-sik. Hyun-su begins to experience symptoms.
3	3	Lee Eung-bok, Jang Young-woo & Park So-hyun	Hong So-ri, Kim Hyung-min & Park So-jung	December 18, 2020
A power outage plunges the complex into darkness. Hyun-su's monstrous urges surface, but he regains control and realizes he has acquired regenerative abilities. Meanwhile, a hulking "protein" monster traps the orphans, but resident Im Myung-sook transforms into a monster and briefly subdues it, allowing the children to escape, before reverting back to human form. Jae-heon lures the protein monster to a window, escaping as it leaps out. The residents take shelter in Du-sik's apartment. In the basement, Yi-kyung restores power but is ambushed by a spider-like monster. On the ground floor, residents watch in shock as a national broadcast shows the president transforming. Yoon-jae arrives with food. The following morning, Cha Jin-ok opens the shutters after seeing her daughter's location marked outside. Lee Su-ung rushes outside to help her daughter, but both are killed by the vampire monster.
4	4	Lee Eung-bok, Jang Young-woo & Park So-hyun	Hong So-ri, Kim Hyung-min & Park So-jung	December 18, 2020
Yi-kyung escapes the basement and returns to the ground floor. A military broadcast debunks infection beliefs, revealing instead that humans transform into monsters when feeling intense desires. Hyun-su, Ji-su, and Jae-heon search outside Du-sik's apartment for other survivors, while Myung-sook and the orphans stay with Du-sik. An unseen force suddenly attacks Hyun-su, causing him to fall from the ninth floor to the ground. However, he survives the fall and is merely knocked unconscious for a few hours. Realizing he is a monster, the ground floor residents debate over whether to oust Hyun-su. Kim Suk-hyun, the complex's convenience store owner, demands that he be kicked out. However, he too starts to show symptoms, and is confined in a room along with Hyun-su. Sang-wook returns downstairs and beats Yoon-jae, who feigns symptoms to avoid him. Upstairs, Myung-sook has fully transformed into a dormant fetus-like monster in Du-sik's bathroom.
5	5	Lee Eung-bok, Jang Young-woo & Park So-hyun	Hong So-ri, Kim Hyung-min & Park So-jung	December 18, 2020
Noticing Jae-heon's shield made by Du-sik, Eun-hyuk orders Hyun-su to bring Du-sik downstairs. Sang-wook, having Yoon-jae's keys and pursuing his own agenda, also goes upstairs, occasionally beating Hyun-su back to consciousness whenever his monster side surfaces. However, monsters suddenly attack them, forcing the two to seek refuge with residents An Gil-seob and Park Yu-ri in their apartment. Sang-wook continues independently upstairs and unlocks a secured room using Yoon-jae's keys, where he discovers incriminating evidence and disturbing photographs of abused children, revealing Yoon-jae to be a child predator. Confronting Yoon-jae downstairs, Sang-wook goes all out and finally beats him to death. He drags Yoon-jae's body outside and retrieves Su-ung's and Jin-ok's daughter's bodies. Hyun-su also returns downstairs with Gil-seob, Yu-ri, Du-sik, and the children, and the group holds a funeral for the deceased. Yi-kyung discovers she is pregnant after taking a pregnancy test. As days pass, Hyun-su continues undertaking dangerous missions for Eun-hyuk and the group.
6	6	Lee Eung-bok, Jang Young-woo & Park So-hyun	Hong So-ri, Kim Hyung-min & Park So-jung	December 18, 2020
Flashbacks reveal that an intentional fire killed Sang-wook's father and left Sang-wook with burn scars when he was young. Seeking revenge, he murdered the arsonist responsible and has since established himself professionally as a contract killer. In the present, Suk-hyun finally transforms into a monster and is killed by his wife, An Seon-yeong, who endured his abuse for years. As food and water start to run low, Eun-hyuk realizes they must leave the complex soon and tasks Hyun-su with finding a functional car in the underground lot. Eun-hyuk, Sang-wook, Ji-su, and Jae-heon leave their posts to help Hyun-su after he is ambushed by various monsters. However, this enables the spider monster to break into the ground floor and attack the rest of the residents. More flashbacks delve into Yi-kyung's past and the mysterious disappearance of her fiancé, Nam Sang-won, days before their wedding. Yi-kyung leaves the complex in search of answers and finds crucial information in Sang-won's office: the monster transformations are believed to be curses, and the government has been conducting experiments on people, including Sang-won, to find a way to combat the curse. Her discovery leads to capture by the military.
7	7	Lee Eung-bok, Jang Young-woo & Park So-hyun	Hong So-ri, Kim Hyung-min & Park So-jung	December 18, 2020
Under pressure from the military's interrogation, Yi-kyung reveals Hyun-su's ability to resist the curse. The military gives her a tracker and orders her to return to the complex, promising specifics on Sang-won in exchange for any information she can provide about Hyun-su. Meanwhile, the underground lot group returns to the ground floor just in time to kill the spider monster and save Du-sik. However, Ji-su suddenly falls ill from appendicitis and requires urgent medical attention. Despite his lack of experience, Eun-hyuk decides to perform surgery on her and sends out a team of Hyun-su, Sang-wook, Gil-seob, and Yu-ri to retrieve food, medicine, and medical tools. As soon as they leave, however, they are attacked by the protein monster, now much stronger and larger. Flashbacks reveal that Hyun-su was bullied in school, which resulted in his depression and an attempt at suicide.
8	8	Lee Eung-bok, Jang Young-woo & Park So-hyun	Hong So-ri, Kim Hyung-min & Park So-jung	December 18, 2020
Yi-kyung returns and drives a firetruck into the protein monster, impaling it on metal bars. Returning with supplies, Ji-su's surgery is successful, and she regains consciousness. Jae-heon promises to teach her how to use his jingum once she fully recovers. Seon-yeong reveals her symptoms to the group and suggests leaving the building, but they decide to have her remain in a separate room instead. Later that night, a military deserter infiltrates the complex and attempts to kill Yi-kyung, but she easily overpowers him, and the group holds him captive. She tells Hyun-su about the government's experiments and admits to revealing him to the military. The next day, the transformed monster janitor suddenly attacks the group with a weed trimmer and severs Jae-heon's arm. Realizing that he is losing too much blood to survive, Jae-heon sacrifices himself to divert the monster away from the group, allowing Eun-hyuk to throw a molotov cocktail, killing both Jae-heon and the monster.
9	9	Lee Eung-bok, Jang Young-woo & Park So-hyun	Hong So-ri, Kim Hyung-min & Park So-jung	December 18, 2020
Ji-su mourns Jae-heon's death; flashbacks reveal that he had confessed his feelings to her before fighting the monster. Suddenly, a gang of bandits storms in the complex, killing the deserter and holding the residents captive. Kim Ji-eun is killed by their leader, Shin Jung-seop. Seon-yeong (later revealed to be Jung Ui-myeong) transforms into a monster and intervenes, killing one of the bandits. Hyun-su kills her before she turns on the residents, but is heavily wounded in the process. Noticing his wounds healing, Jung-seop and Ui-myeong take Hyun-su to the rooftop to torture him. Ui-myeong suddenly kills Jung-seop and reveals himself to Hyun-su as liquid-like monster inhabiting the body of a government researcher. He believes that humans will never accept them and explains joining the bandits to hide his monster nature. Meanwhile, downstairs, Yu-ri kills a bandit, and the rest of the gang are killed by Yi-kyung and Sang-wook. Du-sik begins to show signs of transformation. Ui-myeong presses Hyun-su whether the survivors will stand by him, even as he remains a monster.
10	10	Lee Eung-bok, Jang Young-woo & Park So-hyun	Hong So-ri, Kim Hyung-min & Park So-jung	December 18, 2020
After witnessing the survivors kill a friendly goo monster, Hyun-su is convinced that society will not accept monsters like him. Ui-myeong reveals the military's plans to exterminate both humans and monsters, and suddenly opens fire on the group, killing Sang-wook, Yu-ri, and No Byeong-il. To stop Ui-myeong, Hyun-su unleashes his true monster form and seemingly manages to defeat him. Du-sik calms Hyun-su down, reverting him back to human, but is killed in the process. Gil-seob also dies in his sleep from a preexisting illness. The remaining survivors discover a hatchway leading into an underground tunnel. That night, the military arrives and opens fire at the building, causing it to start collapsing. Hyun-su leaves to surrender himself while the others escape underground, except Eun-hyuk, who remains in the complex and seemingly dies in its collapse just as his nose begins to bleed. The surviving residents—Yi-kyung, Ji-su, Jin-ok, Eun-hyuk's younger sister Lee Eun-yu, Ryu Jae-hwan, Kang Seung-wan, and the orphans—exit the tunnel and are rescued, with Yi-kyung immediately joining the military. Hyun-su wakes up in an armored vehicle and is greeted by Sang-wook, who is actually Ui-myeong in disguise.

=== Season 2 ===
No. overall	Episode	Directed by	Written by	Original release date
11	1	Lee Eung-bok & Park So-hyun	Hong So-ri & Park So-jung	December 1, 2023
Hyun-su awakens in a military vehicle being driven by Sang-wook, whose body is possessed by Ui-myeong. Ui-myeong reveals his intention to prevent Hyun-su from falling into the hands of the military. They escape from the miliary and on their way to meet other special infectees, Ui-myeong experiences memories and hallucinations associated with Sang-wook's past, causing their vehicle to crash. Hyun-su awakens continues towards the military facility with Ui-myeong to volunteer himself for the vaccine. However, their journey is interrupted when soldiers open fire on them, leaving Hyun-su injured. The survivors from Green Home travel with other refugees under military escort. Their journey is disrupted when a monster appears near a military checkpoint, triggering a violent confrontation. The soldiers resort to extreme measures to contain the creature, resulting in several civilian casualties. Master Sergeant Tak In-hwan releases the creature's offspring, expressing his belief that monsters should only be killed when they pose a threat to humans. After loosing Hyun-su, Yi-kyung manages to enter the Bamseom facility, where she witnesses experiments under Dr Lim involving monsterized individuals and their family members.
12	2	Lee Eung-bok & Park So-hyun	Hong So-ri & Park So-jung	December 1, 2023
In the past, Eun-hyeok asks Ji-su to lead the group. In the present, Eun-yu commands Chan-young and his superior group at gun point to return to the ruins of Green Home in search of her brother. She finds evidence indicating that Eun-hyeok had been infected before the building collapsed, strengthening her belief that he may still be alive. Meanwhile, the superior manipulates Jae-hwan by promising access to a vaccine in exchange for cooperation. The survivors subsequently encounter a monster, and the military superior is killed during the confrontation. The group escapes with Chan-young joined by Ho-sang, a hitchhiker on the way. As the survivors continue their journey, Jae-hwan undergoes monsterization and kills Su-yeong. The group manages to set him on fire. At the Bamseom Emergency Management Bureau, Hyun-su asks Dr. Lim to use him to develop a vaccine, even if the process puts his life at risk. Dr. Lim later meets Yi-kyung and reveals that Sang-won has become a monster.
13	3	Lee Eung-bok & Park So-hyun	Hong So-ri & Park So-jung	December 1, 2023
The surviving members along with Chan-yang reach the shelter. Meanwhile, Master In-Hwan confronts General Han, who shoots himself before revealing further information about the military's plans. At the Bamseom Emergency Management Bureau, Dr. Lim is brought before the Prime Minister and other government officials and tortured about the whereabouts of the vaccine. The Prime Minister attacks the shelter to prevent the transmission of the curse. As missiles strike the area, the shelter descends into chaos, separating the survivors. Tak and Kim arrive at the facility and intervene to stop the bombing. He and the soldiers kill the Prime minsiter and the officials, preventing further destruction of the shelter and set fire to the research facility. Amid the chaos, Ui-myeong recovers from his injuries and releases the monsters held inside the laboratory. He confronts Hyun-su, takes control of Hyun-su's arm, causing his body to undergo a stone-like transformation. Yi-kyung discovers the body of her fiance and goes into labour while attempting to escape across a frozen lake. At the destroyed shelter, Yeong-su and Eun-yu survives and Ji-su collapses. The surviving military personnel and refugees arriving at a nearby stadium, where they encounter another group of survivors.
14	4	Lee Eung-bok & Park So-hyun	Hong So-ri & Park So-jung	December 1, 2023
On the 337th day since the outbreak, the surviving refugees live in an underground shelter beneath a stadium. In-hwan maintains security and enforces restrictions on expeditions outside the shelter. The former residents of Green Home face discrimination from other survivors, particularly Lee Eun-yu, who is blamed by Chief Ji for her husband's death. Eun-yu continues making trips outside the shelter in search of Eun-hyeok. Chief Ji asks Do Sang-jin and Dong-gi to follow Eun-yu in exchange for her assistance in gaining permission to join the military expeditions. Oh Jun-il follows them. Eun-yu follows a route marked with red ribbons. A flashback reveals that she previously encountered and killed a monster resembling a winged creature, which had attached a red ribbon to her. Jun-il separates from them and attacked by Yi-su. Elsewhere, Sang-jin and Dong-gi who plans to kill Eun-yu. She hides inside an abandoned building, while Yi-su takes control of Dong-gi, who subsequently kills Sang-jin. Eun-yu manages to escape as monsters surround her hiding place. At the shelter, Sergeant Choi abandons his post after discovering a hospital and attempts to obtain medicine for Ji-na, who is injured. Meanwhile, Mrs. Oh while attempting to leave the compound accidentally steps on a landmine. Chan-young helps her, while Tak and the other soldiers prepare to respond to the situation.
15	5	Lee Eung-bok & Park So-hyun	Hong So-ri & Park So-jung	December 1, 2023
Eun-yu attempts to protect the mysterious girl from Dong-gi unknowing her ability to control monsters. At the stadium, the explosion of a landmine attracts nearby monsters. The expedition team lures the approaching creatures towards a nearby gas station and destroys them using the remaining explosives. Mrs. Oh is placed in quarantine. Dr. Lim discovers that Jun-il has monster-related characteristics despite showing no typical symptoms of monsterization. Eun-yu confronts Chief Ji, who continues to blame her for her husband's death. Chan-young notices the red ribbon around Eun-yu's hand and questions whether she is searching for the monster responsible for Chief Ji's husband's death. Yi-su offers to help Eun-yu find Eun-hyeok. Seo Yi-kyung then appears, holding a gun and demanding that her child, Yi-su to be handed over.
16	6	Lee Eung-bok & Park So-hyun	Hong So-ri & Park So-jung	December 1, 2023
Yi-kyung takes Yi-su to a boat. Flashbacks reveal that Yi-su was hunted by men during her childhood because of her unusual abilities. She subsequently used her powers to possess and kill them. Yi-kyung recalls her fear upon discovering her daughter's condition and struggles to accept her. Following them, Eun-yu and Chan-young are trapped in a pit set up by Ho-sang and Ha-ni. Ha-ni who developed an interest in Chan-yoyng keeps him while allows Eun-yu to leave.Yi-su encounters Eun-yu again and expresses hostility towards humans. When Eun-yu asks about Yi-kyung, Yi-su pushes her into a tunnel. As Eun-yu falls, Cha Hyun-su appears and rescues her. Dr. Lim witnesses Jun-il killing Ms. Oh before undergoing a violent transformation and explodes. Lim informs In-hwan, who conceals their deaths by reporting that Mrs. Oh had transformed and killed her son. Tak begins experiencing symptoms of monsterization and attempts to take his own life but accidentally attacks Dr. Lim. Lim offers to help him become a special infectee capable of controlling his transformation in exchange for his release. Kim discovers an SOS signal originating from the Bamseom Emergency Management Bureau.
17	7	Lee Eung-bok & Park So-hyun	Hong So-ri & Park So-jung	December 1, 2023
18	8	Lee Eung-bok & Park So-hyun	Hong So-ri & Park So-jung	December 1, 2023

=== Season 3 ===
No. overall	Episode	Directed by	Written by	Original release date
19	1	Lee Eung-bok & Park So-hyun	Hong So-ri & Park So-jung	July 19, 2024
20	2	Lee Eung-bok & Park So-hyun	Hong So-ri & Park So-jung	July 19, 2024
21	3	Lee Eung-bok & Park So-hyun	Hong So-ri & Park So-jung	July 19, 2024
22	4	Lee Eung-bok & Park So-hyun	Hong So-ri & Park So-jung	July 19, 2024
23	5	Lee Eung-bok & Park So-hyun	Hong So-ri & Park So-jung	July 19, 2024
24	6	Lee Eung-bok & Park So-hyun	Hong So-ri & Park So-jung	July 19, 2024
25	7	Lee Eung-bok & Park So-hyun	Hong So-ri & Park So-jung	July 19, 2024
26	8	Lee Eung-bok & Park So-hyun	Hong So-ri & Park So-jung	July 19, 2024

== Production ==
=== Development ===
Director Lee Eung-bok "roughly" knew the ending of the Line Webtoon on which the series is based before the webtoon's finale in July 2020, though he decided to "differ a bit from the webtoon because [they're] showing on different platforms." Ultimately, the live-action adaptation deviates dramatically from the original.

The series spent most of its budget, with each episode costing ₩3 billion. Choreographer Kim Seol-jin and contortionist Troy James were chosen to record the monsters' movements through motion capture.

=== Casting ===
Although filming had already started, Netflix officially announced the series' lineup on December 18, 2019, with Song Kang, Lee Jin-wook and Lee Si-young in lead roles, and Lee Do-hyun, Kim Nam-hee, Go Min-si, Park Gyu-young, Go Youn-jung, Kim Kap-soo and Kim Sang-ho as part of the ensemble cast.

Lee Eung-bok revealed that, during Song Kang's audition, the actor reminded him of Johnny Depp in Edward Scissorhands: "an image of someone who has a pure and innocent soul but is holding a spear in his hand." The actor was recommended to Lee Eung-bok by the director of Netflix's Love Alarm which propelled him to fame in August 2019. Lee Si-young's character does not appear in the original webtoon but the director "wanted to add a female character who can pull off really cool action scenes"; the actress being a former amateur boxer. She trained for six months prior to filming the series. Park Gyu-young admitted that she did not have high hopes about being picked for the series but "as soon as [she] left the audition set, the director called [her] and said to leave with a script."

In September 2022, actress Bibi withdrew from filming due to timing and filming schedules, and an actress replaced her role.

=== Filming ===
Principal photography began in September 2019 and filming was completed in February 2020.

=== Visual effects ===
Designers from Legacy Effects, VFX Studio Westworld and Spectral Motion, who worked on films such as the Avengers and Avatar as well as the television series Game of Thrones and Stranger Things, were recruited for Sweet Home.

== Release ==
On November 18, 2020, Netflix released a trailer for the series announcing that Sweet Home would premiere on December 18. In June 2022, the series was picked up for two additional seasons.

== Reception ==
=== Critical response ===
==== Season 1 ====
On the review aggregator website Rotten Tomatoes, 86% of 7 critics' reviews are positive, with an average rating of 6.6/10.

Kavya Christopher of The Times of India gave a rating of 4/5 and said, "One does not need to be a lover of the horror genre to enjoy this series, thanks to the many underlying plots of the various characters – both big and small. The action is superb, to say the least, and the drama is endearing at various levels."

Joel Keller of Decider said that "despite its flaws and a premise we've seen before, Sweet Home distinguishes itself by its setting and its monsters. We will see if the drama between the survivors will keep us watching."

Pierce Conran of South China Morning Post gave a rating of 3/5, saying that "despite a breathless opening episode and some grisly fun throughout, Sweet Home does not provide much of a story for viewers to get hooked on."

In another mixed review, Meagan Navarro of Bloody Disgusting said that "what sprints out of the gate and sets up an exciting creature-filled horror series quickly comes to a slow crawl zombie apocalypse that we've seen many times before. It just swaps out the zombies for monsters."

==== Season 2 ====
On the review aggregator website Rotten Tomatoes, 80% of 5 critics' reviews are positive, with an average rating of 5.9/10.

=== Viewership ===
Sweet Home was the first South Korean series to enter Netflix's Top 10 in the United States, reaching as high as third. Three days after its release, the series ranked first in 8 regions and was within the Top 10 in 42 regions. The show was viewed by 22 million paid subscribers worldwide in the first 4 weeks of its release and appeared in the Netflix top 10 in more than 70 countries.

It was praised by viewers for its "high-quality visual effects" and "the deep human connections among the characters." However, many criticized the soundtrack which they believe did not fit with the story, as well as the lack of monsters in the latter episodes of the season. On this, director Lee Eung-bok said that "[he] know[s] some of the viewers were anticipating more gore, but [he] hope[s] they will understand why monsters were absent from some parts of our drama."

== Accolades ==
=== Awards and nominations ===
Name of the award ceremony, year presented, category, nominee of the award, and the result of the nomination
Award ceremony	Year	Category	Nominee	Result	Ref.
Asian Academy Creative Awards	2021	Best Actress	Lee Si-young	Nominated	
Asian Academy Creative Awards	2021	Best Supporting Actor	Lee Do-hyun	Won	
Asian Academy Creative Awards	2021	Best Supporting Actress	Go Min-si	Nominated	
Asian Academy Creative Awards	2021	Best Direction	Lee Eung-bok	Won	
Asian Academy Creative Awards	2021	Best Visual OR Special in TV Series OR Feature Film	Sweet Home	Nominated	
Asia Contents Awards	2021	ACA Excellence Award	Song Kang	Won	
Asia Contents Awards	2021	Best OTT Original	Sweet Home	Nominated	
Asia Contents Awards	2021	Technical Achievement Award	Sweet Home	Won	
Asia Contents Awards	2021	Creative Beyond Border	Sweet Home	Nominated	
Asia Contents Awards	2021	Best Actress	Lee Si-young	Nominated	
Asia Contents Awards	2021	Best Newcomer Actress	Go Min-si	Won	
Baeksang Arts Awards	2021	Best New Actor – Television	Song Kang	Nominated	
Baeksang Arts Awards	2021	Best New Actress – Television	Park Gyu-young	Nominated	
Baeksang Arts Awards	2021	Technical Award (Visual effects)	Lee Byung-joo	Nominated	
Seoul International Drama Awards	2021	Outstanding Korean Actor	Song Kang	Nominated	
Seoul International Drama Awards	2021	Outstanding Korean Actor	Lee Do-hyun	Nominated	
Seoul International Drama Awards	2021	Character of the year	Song Kang	Won	
Seoul International Drama Awards	2021	Outstanding Korean Drama	Sweet Home	Nominated	

=== Listicles ===
Name of publisher, year listed, name of listicle, and placement
Publisher	Year	Listicle	Placement	Ref.
Entertainment Weekly	2025	The 21 best Korean shows on Netflix to watch now	Top 21	
