= Celebrity Bromance =

- Promotional poster
- Genre: Variety show
- Written by: Lee Kyung-ha
- Directed by: Hwang Jiyeong
- Country of origin: South Korea
- Original language: Korean

Original release
- Network: Naver TV Cast; MBig TV
- Release: February 4, 2016 – March 7, 2017

Celebrity Bromance (Korean: 꽃미남 브로맨스; RR: Kkonminam beuromaenseu; lit. 'Flower Boy Bromance') is a South Korean variety show broadcast on MBig TV, available to mobile users. Celebrity Bromance portrays star friendships, and is filmed the "paparazzi - style" from a distance to allow the cast members to feel less overwhelmed by cameras. The episodes are available on Naver TVCast and YouTube on every Tuesday on 11 PM KST.

The program premiered on February 4, 2016, with the singer V of BTS and actor Kim Min-jae.

== Cast members ==
- Season 1 –

V (BTS) & Kim Min-Jae

- Season 2 –

Zico (Block B) & Choi Tae-joon

- Season 3 –

Kim Ryeowook (Super Junior) & Park Hyung-sik (ZE:A)

- Season 4 –

Ji Soo & Nam Joo-hyuk

- Season 5 –

Jackson (GOT7) & Jooheon (Monsta X)

- Season 6 –

L (INFINITE) & Kim Min Seok

- Season 7 –

N (VIXX) & Lee Won-keun

- Season 8 –

Jungkook (BTS) & Lee Minwoo (Shinhwa)

- Season 9 –

Jung Joon-young & Roy Kim

- Chuseok Special –

Jackson (GOT7) & Ahn Hyo-seop

- Season 10 –

Park Kyung (Block B) & Kim Ji-seok

- Season 11 –

Gongchan (B1A4) & Hongbin (VIXX)

- Season 12 –

JB (GOT7) & YoungJae (B.A.P)

- Season 13 –

Sungjae (BTOB) & Youngmin, Kwangmin (BOYFRIEND)

- Season 14 –

Son Dong-woon (Highlight) & Lee Gi-kwang (Highlight)

== List of episodes ==
=== 2016 ===
List of episodes in 2016

2016
Season	Episode	Date Airing	Cast Member	Title	Remark
1	1	February 4	V (BTS) & Kim Min-Jae	The first two and a half years ...!	
1	2	February 11	V (BTS) & Kim Min-Jae	Screams the night	
1	3	February 18	V (BTS) & Kim Min-Jae	Sparks were flying Rush	
1	4	February 25	V (BTS) & Kim Min-Jae	Words with you ...	Guest: J-Hope & Rap Monster (BTS)
2	5	March 1	Zico (Block B) & Choi Tae-joon	I am you, you are my	
2	6	March 3	Zico (Block B) & Choi Tae-joon	Nalin Nalin NalinA	
2	7	March 8	Zico (Block B) & Choi Tae-joon	Do you want to eat meat?	
2	8	March 10	Zico (Block B) & Choi Tae-joon	Very Very Good	Guest: Eddy Kim & Jung Joon-young
3	9	March 15	Kim Ryeowook (Super Junior) & Park Hyung-sik (ZE:A)	Temptation of Wolves	
3	10	March 17	Kim Ryeowook (Super Junior) & Park Hyung-sik (ZE:A)	My brother is coming!	
3	11	March 22	Kim Ryeowook (Super Junior) & Park Hyung-sik (ZE:A)	And you want one up	
3	12	March 24	Kim Ryeowook (Super Junior) & Park Hyung-sik (ZE:A)	I will do better	Guest: Kangin (Super Junior) & Hwang Kwanghee (ZE:A)
4	13	March 29	Ji Soo & Nam Joo-hyuk	Youth?	
4	14	March 31	Ji Soo & Nam Joo-hyuk	Today is a beautiful day	
4	15	April 5	Ji Soo & Nam Joo-hyuk	You eat like best	
4	16	April 7	Ji Soo & Nam Joo-hyuk	Me to you?	
4	17	April 12	Ji Soo & Nam Joo-hyuk	Man disappearances	
4	18	April 14	Ji Soo & Nam Joo-hyuk	Starry night	
5	19	April 19	Jackson (GOT7) & Jooheon (Monsta X)	I waited all day	
5	20	April 21	Jackson (GOT7) & Jooheon (Monsta X)	You come with me?	
5	21	April 26	Jackson (GOT7) & Jooheon (Monsta X)	Really Hot Bar	
5	22	April 28	Jackson (GOT7) & Jooheon (Monsta X)	JackHeon night mountaineering	
5	23	May 3	Jackson (GOT7) & Jooheon (Monsta X)	I look fine to bully it?	
5	24	May 5	Jackson (GOT7) & Jooheon (Monsta X)	Brothers watching it	Guest: Mark Tuan, Jinyoung & BamBam (GOT7)
6	25	May 10	L (INFINITE) & Kim Min Seok	Wind descendants	
6	26	May 12	L (INFINITE) & Kim Min Seok	Tell us why	
6	27	May 17	L (INFINITE) & Kim Min Seok	Flowers handsome vampire outing	
6	28	May 19	L (INFINITE) & Kim Min Seok	Chaser VS Terminator	
6	29	May 24	L (INFINITE) & Kim Min Seok	Burning night	
special episode	30	May 26	V (BTS) & Kim Min-Jae	Special Edition	
7	31	May 31	N (VIXX) & Lee Won-keun	My boyhood	
7	32	June 7	N (VIXX) & Lee Won-keun	Candid Event	
7	33	June 14	N (VIXX) & Lee Won-keun	Water boy	
7	34	June 21	N (VIXX) & Lee Won-keun	Trauma	Guest: Jung Eun-ji (Apink)
8	35	June 28	Jungkook (BTS) & Lee Minwoo (Shinwha)	Bulletproof ah, becoming myth it	
8	36	July 5	Jungkook (BTS) & Lee Minwoo (Shinwha)	Perfect Man	
8	37	July 12	Jungkook (BTS) & Lee Minwoo (Shinwha)	Who is the outcome of those?	
8	38	July 19	Jungkook (BTS) & Lee Minwoo (Shinwha)	Warm farewell	
8	39	July 26	Jungkook (BTS) & Lee Minwoo (Shinwha)	Brothers are watching	Guest: Jin & Jimin (BTS)
9	40	August 9	Jung Joon-young & Roy Kim	Train to Mokpo	
9	41	August 16	Jung Joon-young & Roy Kim	Finding Nemo and Dory	
9	42	August 23	Jung Joon-young & Roy Kim	Bucket List	
9	43	August 30	Jung Joon-young & Roy Kim	Mokpo, it's a big hit	
Chuseok Special (special episode)		September 14	Jackson (GOT7) & Ahn Hyo-seop		
10	44	October 4	Park Kyung (Block B) & Kim Ji-seok	Smell of the Idol	
10	45	October 11	Park Kyung (Block B) & Kim Ji-seok	Idol Manual	
10	46	October 18	Park Kyung (Block B) & Kim Ji-seok	Idol's taboo	
10	47	October 25	Park Kyung (Block B) & Kim Ji-seok	The Idol's weight of the Sincerity	
11	48	November 1	Gongchan (B1A4) & Hongbin (VIXX)	Look! Your handsomeness is on your face	
11	49	November 8	Gongchan (B1A4) & Hongbin (VIXX)	Ready to Play	
11	50	November 15	Gongchan (B1A4) & Hongbin (VIXX)	Way to survive as the Handsome one	
11	51	November 22	Gongchan (B1A4) & Hongbin (VIXX)	All about my Love Story	
12	52	November 29	JB (GOT7) & YoungJae (B.A.P)	You Made it Big	
12	53	December 6	JB (GOT7) & YoungJae (B.A.P)	A Liaison between you and me	
12	54	December 13	JB (GOT7) & YoungJae (B.A.P)	I only "hard carry" you	
12	55	December 20	JB (GOT7) & YoungJae (B.A.P)	We cooked	
12	56	December 27	JB (GOT7) & YoungJae (B.A.P)	A dancing king	

=== 2017 ===
List of episodes in 2017

2017
Season	Episode	Date Airing	Cast Member	Title	Remark
13	57	January 3	Sungjae (BTOB) & Youngmin, Kwangmin (BOYFRIEND)	"Pretty boys" Winter Camp	First ever season for three celebrity friends.
13	58	January 10	Sungjae (BTOB) & Youngmin, Kwangmin (BOYFRIEND)	The Three Musketeers	
13	59	January 17	Sungjae (BTOB) & Youngmin, Kwangmin (BOYFRIEND)	Centripetal	
13	60	January 24	Sungjae (BTOB) & Youngmin, Kwangmin (BOYFRIEND)	Board genius eternal teacher	
13	61	January 31	Sungjae (BTOB) & Youngmin, Kwangmin (BOYFRIEND)	Unsealed Night	
14	62	February 7	Son Dong-woon (Highlight) & Lee Gi-kwang (Highlight)	Idol's Sorrow	
14	63	February 14	Son Dong-woon (Highlight) & Lee Gi-kwang (Highlight)	Here! Add two more animals!	
14	64	February 21	Son Dong-woon (Highlight) & Lee Gi-kwang (Highlight)	What about my age?	
14	65	February 28	Son Dong-woon (Highlight) & Lee Gi-kwang (Highlight)	Moisturized Brothers	
14	66	March 7	Son Dong-woon (Highlight) & Lee Gi-kwang (Highlight)	Today's Highlight	
