= A Good Day to Be a Dog =

2023–2024 South Korean television series

- Promotional poster
- Hangul: 오늘도 사랑스럽개
- Lit.: It's Lovely Today Too
- RR: Oneuldo sarangseureopgae
- MR: Onŭldo sarangsŭrŏpkae
- Genre: Romantic comedy; Fantasy
- Based on: A Good Day to Be a Dog by Lee Hye
- Developed by: Kwon Sung-chang (planning)
- Written by: Baek In-ah
- Directed by: Kim Dae-woong
- Starring: Park Gyu-young; Cha Eun-woo; Lee Hyun-woo
- Music by: Ryu Young-min
- Country of origin: South Korea
- Original language: Korean
- No. of episodes: 14

Production
- Executive producer: Choo Hyeon-seong
- Producers: Kim Young-bae; Lee Sang-won
- Running time: 70 minutes
- Production companies: Group 8; Fantagio; A&E Korea (production investment)
- Budget: ₩5 billion

Original release
- Network: MBC TV
- Release: October 11, 2023 – January 10, 2024

A Good Day to Be a Dog (Korean: 오늘도 사랑스럽개) is a South Korean television series based on a Naver webtoon of the same name by Lee Hye, which was published between 2017 and 2019, directed by Kim Dae-woong, and starring Park Gyu-young, Cha Eun-woo, and Lee Hyun-woo. It aired on MBC TV from October 11, 2023 to January 10, 2024, every Wednesday at 21:00 (KST). It is also available for streaming on Viki and Viu in selected regions.

== Synopsis ==
The drama tells the story of the romance between a woman cursed to turn into a dog whenever she kisses someone, and a man who can break the curse, but is afraid of dogs due to a childhood trauma.

== Cast ==
=== Main ===
- Park Gyu-young as Han Hae-na/Mak-soon: a high school Korean language teacher who turns into a dog when she kisses someone for the first time.
- Cha Eun-woo as Jin Seo-won/Soo-hyun: a high school math teacher who is afraid of dogs due to childhood trauma.
- Lee Hyun-woo as Lee Bo-gyeom/San-sin: a high school Korean history teacher who is known for being handsome and for his sweet gestures.
- Yoon Hyun-soo as Choi Yul: Seo-won's nephew and Hae-na's student.
- Kim Yi-kyung as Min Ji-ah: a high school student.

=== Supporting ===
==== Hae-na's family ====
- Ryu Abel as Han Yoo-na: Hae-na's older sister.
- Jung Young-joo as Shin Mi-seon: Hae-na's mother.
- Kim Hong-pyo as Han Pan-dong: Hae-na's father.
- Cho Jin-se as Song Woo-taek: Yoo-na's childhood friend.
- Kim Hae-jun as Hae-na's maternal uncle.

==== Garam High School teachers ====
- Lee Seo-el as Yoon Chae-ah: a Korean language teacher.
- Song Young-ah as Cheon Song-yi: a music teacher.
- Yoo Seung-mok as the vice principal

==== Hae-na's students ====
- Jo Ah-young as Song Da-eun, a high school student who falls in love with Seo-won.
- Kang Soo-bin as Kwon Ri-ae, a schoolgirl who is big fan of Bo-gyeom and good at math as well as physics.
- Kim Min-ji as Chu So-yeon
- Shin Jun-hang as Jo Jun-seo

==== Other ====
- Kim Min-seok as Kang Eun-hwan: Seo-won's high school classmate.
- Lee Seung-jun as Oh Sang-soo, Yoo-na's ex-boyfriend.

=== Extended ===
- Lee Jong-wook as Min-sik: a fellow teacher at Garam High School.
- Shim Wan-joon as a physical education teacher at Garam High School.
- Park Hae-in as Yoon-ji: a fellow teacher at Garam High School.

=== Special appearance ===
- Lee Yong-nyeo as Popi's owner

== Production ==
Filming began in October 2022 and finished in April 2023.

== Viewership ==
A Good Day to Be a Dog : South Korea viewers per episode (thousands)

Season	Episode number													
Season	1	2	3	4	5	6	7	8	9	10	11	12	13	14
1	N/A	555	N/A	N/A	N/A	N/A	N/A	N/A	N/A	N/A	N/A	N/A	N/A	N/A

Source: Audience measurement performed nationwide by Nielsen Korea.

Average TV viewership ratings (nationwide)
Ep.	Original broadcast date	Average audience share (Nielsen Korea)
1	October 11, 2023	2.2% (29th)
2	October 11, 2023	2.8% (21st)
3	October 18, 2023	1.9% (29th)
4	November 1, 2023	1.7% (32nd)
5	November 15, 2023	1.7% (30th)
6	November 15, 2023	2.2% (26th)
7	November 22, 2023	2.2% (25th)
8	November 29, 2023	1.9% (29th)
9	December 6, 2023	1.8% (27th)
10	December 13, 2023	1.9% (28th)
11	December 20, 2023	1.5% (34th)
12	December 27, 2023	1.8% (29th)
13	January 3, 2024	1.5% (35th)
14	January 10, 2024	1.5% (36th)
Average		1.9%
In the table above, the blue numbers represent the lowest ratings and the red numbers represent the highest ratings.

== Accolades ==
=== Awards and nominations ===
Name of the award ceremony, year presented, category, nominee(s) of the award, and the result of the nomination
Award ceremony	Year	Category	Nominee	Result	Ref.
APAN Star Awards	2023	Best Couple Award	Cha Eun-woo and Park Gyu-young	Nominated	
APAN Star Awards	2023	Best Original Soundtrack Award	"Jealousy"	Nominated	
Blue Dragon Ranking Awards (Note: The Blue Dragon Ranking is a popularity award organized by Sports Chosun, the organizer of the Blue Dragon Film Awards and Blue Dragon Series Awards. It recognizes trend-setting actors by presenting semiannual awards for Best Actor and Best Actress.)	2024	Best Actor Award (Note: First Half of 2024.)	Cha Eun-woo	Won	
Korea First Brand Awards	2024	Best Male Idol-Actor Award (Vietnam)	Cha Eun-woo	Won	
Modelpress Best Entertainment Awards	2023	Best Korean Drama	A Good Day to Be a Dog	4th place	
MBC Drama Awards	2023	Excellence Award, Actress in a Miniseries	Park Gyu-young	Won	
MBC Drama Awards	2023	Best Couple Award	Cha Eun-woo and Park Gyu-young	Nominated	
MBC Drama Awards	2023	Best New Actor	Yoon Hyun-soo	Nominated	
MBC Drama Awards	2023	Excellence Award, Actor in a Miniseries	Lee Hyun-woo	Nominated	
MBC Drama Awards	2023	Top Excellence Award, Actor in a Miniseries	Cha Eun-woo	Nominated	

=== Listicles ===
Publisher	Year	Listicle	Placement	Ref.
Forbes	2023	20 Best Korean Dramas of 2023	15th	
Rolling Stone	2023	10 Best South Korean TV Shows of 2023	Mentioned	
