= Nam Ji-hyun (actress, born 1990) =

South Korean actress (born 1990)

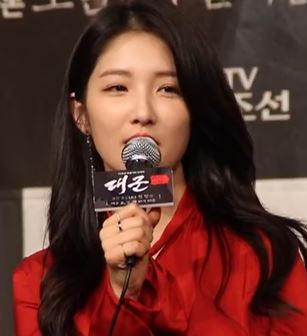
- Nam in 2018
- Born: January 9, 1990 (age 36); Incheon, South Korea
- Education: Sangmyung University
- Occupations: Actress; singer
- Years active: 2009–2023
- Musical career
- Genre: K-pop
- Instrument: Vocals
- Years active: 2009–2016
- Label: Cube
- Formerly of: 4Minute; United Cube

Korean name
- Hangul: 남지현
- Hanja: 南智賢
- RR: Nam Jihyeon
- MR: Nam Chihyŏn

Nam Ji-hyun (Korean: 남지현; born January 9, 1990), known mononymously as Jihyun, and formerly known by her stage name Son Ji-hyun, is a South Korean actress and former singer. She is best known as the former leader and a vocalist of now-disbanded South Korean girl group 4Minute.

== Early life ==
Nam Ji-hyun was born on January 9, 1990 in Bupyeong District, Incheon, South Korea. Jihyun auditioned for JYP Entertainment but was eliminated. However, she then joined Cube Entertainment as a result of Cube Entertainment's founder, Hong Seung-sung, being recommended by JYP's recruitment department in finding members to form 4Minute.

On February 24, 2015, she graduated from Sangmyung University receiving a degree in Contemporary Ballet and a lifetime achievement award at the university's graduation ceremony.

== Career ==
=== 2009–2015: Debut and solo activities ===
Ji-hyun was chosen as a member of 4Minute in 2009. The 5-member girl group officially debuted on June 18, 2009, with performing their debut single "Hot Issue" on M Countdown.

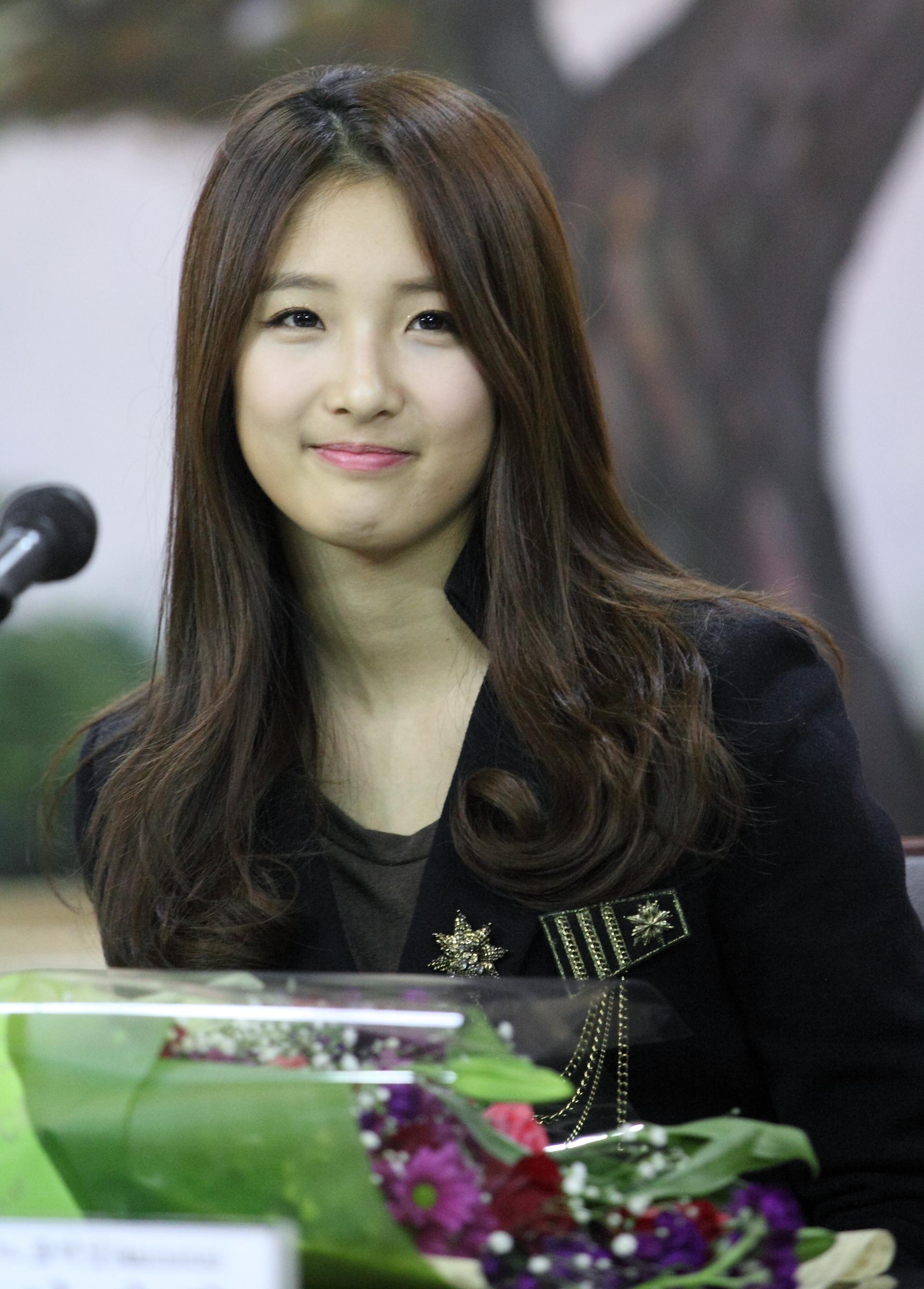
Nam in December 2010

In 2010, Ji-hyun made her acting debut in the television series It's Okay, Daddy's Girl, playing a law student.

In 2011, Ji-hyun was cast in MBC's weekend drama A Thousand Kisses, playing the younger sister of Ryu Jin.

In February 2013, Ji-hyun was cast in the idol version of Love and War 2, a sitcom which creates reenactments of the problems and issues a couple may face in their marriage. In October, Ji-hyun was cast in her first lead role in the mobile drama Please Remember, Princess.

In April 2014, Ji-hyun was cast in KBS' teen drama High School. However, she dropped out of the drama due to her overseas schedules conflicts. In September, Ji-hyun was cast in the web drama Love Cells. The same year, she starred in the anthology film The Youth.

In 2015, Ji-hyun starred in the 5-episode web drama Never Die.

=== 2016–2023: Group disbandment, acting career ===
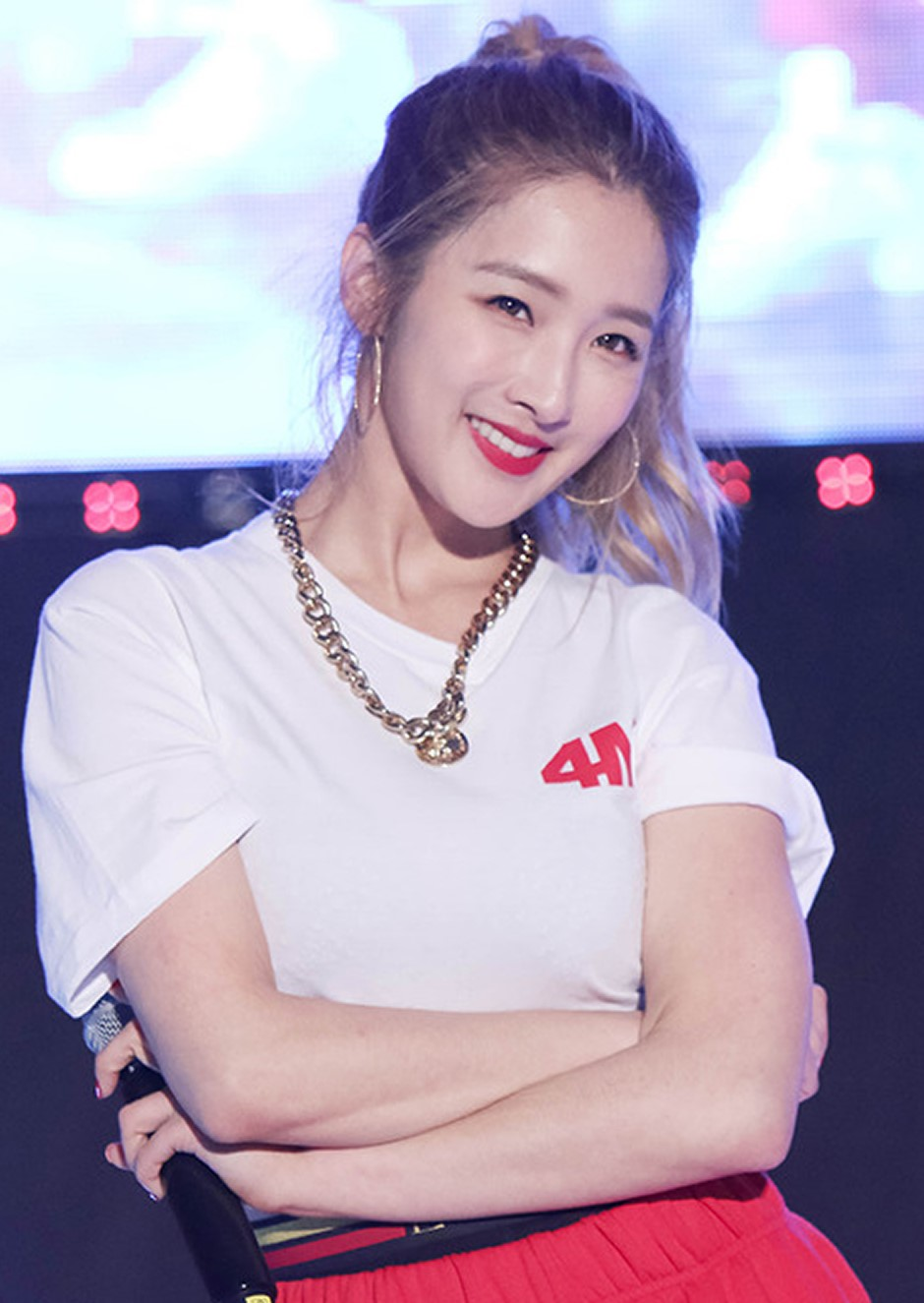
Nam performing at the Hankuk International Festival in 2016

On June 13, 2016, Cube Entertainment announced that 4Minute has disbanded and the members are still in discussion to renew their contracts. On June 15, Cube Entertainment officially announced that Jihyun, Gayoon, Jiyoon and Sohyun's contracts had expired on June 14 and that the members decided not to renew their contracts, hence their departure from Cube Entertainment. Since 4Minute's disbandment, Ji-hyun signed a new contract with Artist Company to pursue a career in acting.

In 2017, Ji-hyun starred in KBS' youth romance drama Strongest Deliveryman. In December 2017, Artist Company announced that she had changed her name to Son Ji-hyun.

In 2018, Ji-hyun starred in TV Chosun's historical drama Grand Prince.

In December 2021, Ji-hyun signed a contract with FN Entertainment.

In August 2022, Ji-hyun signed a contract with Urban Works.

== Personal life ==
She has a Pilates license.

== Discography ==
=== Soundtrack appearances ===
Title	Year	Album
"Only You" (with Jeon Ji-yoon)	2013	Love for Ten – Generation of Youth OST

== Filmography ==
=== Film ===
Year	Title	Role	Notes	Ref.
2010	Midnight FM	Herself	Cameo	
2014	The Youth	Seung-ah	Segment: "Wonderwall"	
2019	Trade Your Love	Kim Sin-ah		
2022	Dead Camping The Live	Soo-yeon		

=== Television series ===
Year	Title	Role	Notes	Ref.
2010	It's Okay, Daddy's Girl	Shin Sun-hae		
2011	A Thousand Kisses	Jang Soo-ah		
2012	The Third Hospital	Herself	Cameo	
2012	Miss Panda and Mr. Hedgehog	Herself	Cameo	
2013	Monstar	Stella	Cameo	
2013	Love and War 2	Seo Young		
2013	Please Remember, Princess Generation of Romance	Yoon Min-ah		
2014	Marriage, Not Dating	Herself	Cameo	
2014	Love Cells	Seo-rin		
2015	Never Die	Se-yeon		
2016	My Little Baby	Han So-yoon		
2017	Strongest Deliveryman	Choi Yeon-ji		
2018	Grand Prince	Ru Shi-gae		
2018	Monkey and Dog Romance	Yang Joo-mi	Lead role	
2019	When the Devil Calls Your Name	Yu Dong-hui		
2020	Lonely Enough to Love	Han Ah-Reum		
2022	Why Her	Na Se-ryoon		

=== Television shows ===
Year	Title	Role	Notes	Ref.
2012	The Romantic & Idol	Regular cast	with ZE:A's Hyungsik	
2012	She and Her Car	Host		
2015	Real Beauty	MC		
2020	King of Mask Singer	Contestant	as "White Butterfly" (episode 245)	

== Awards and nominations ==
Name of the award ceremony, year presented, category, nominee of the award, and the result of the nomination
Award ceremony	Year	Category	Nominee / Work	Result	Ref.
SBS Drama Awards	2022	Best Supporting Team	Why Her	Nominated	
