= The Policeman's Lineage =

2022 film by Lee Kyoo-man

- Theatrical release poster
- Hangul: 경관의 피
- Lit.: Officer's Blood
- RR: Gyeonggwanui pi
- MR: Kyŏnggwanŭi p'i
- Directed by: Lee Kyoo-man
- Screenplay by: Bae Young-ik
- Based on: The Policeman's Lineage by Joh Sasaki
- Starring: Cho Jin-woong; Choi Woo-shik; Park Hee-soon; Kwon Yul; Park Myung-hoon
- Cinematography: Gang Guk-hyeon
- Edited by: Nam Na-yeong
- Music by: Jang Young-gyu
- Production company: Leeyang Film
- Distributed by: Acemaker Movieworks
- Release date: January 5, 2022
- Running time: 119 minutes
- Country: South Korea
- Language: Korean
- Box office: US$5.9 million

The Policeman's Lineage (Korean: 경관의 피; RR: Gyeonggwanui pi) is a 2022 South Korean action thriller film directed by Lee Kyoo-man, and starring Cho Jin-woong and Choi Woo-shik. The film, based on the Japanese novel of the same name by Joh Sasaki, is about two cops with different methods forming a team to investigate a case that turns the police force upside down. The film was released theatrically on January 5, 2022.

== Synopsis ==
The Investigation Unit chief, Park Kang-yoon, conducts investigations into criminals while receiving massive, untraceable sponsorship funds. He resides in a luxury villa, wears designer suits, and drives a foreign car. One day, Kang-yoon gets a new team member, Choi Min-jae, a rookie cop who is a principled perfectionist to his core.

As Kang-yoon gradually opens up about his unorthodox investigative methods, the two men grow closer while working together on a new synthetic drug case. However, Kang-yoon soon discovers that Min-jae is actually an undercover officer sent to investigate him. Min-jae, in turn, uncovers the dark secrets of the police force.

== Cast ==
- Cho Jin-woong as Park Kang-yoon, head of the Metropolitan Investigation Unit
- Choi Woo-shik as Choi Min-jae, an undercover honest police officer
  - Park Sang-hoon as young Choi Min-jae
- Park Hee-soon as Hwang In-ho
- Kwon Yul as Na Young-bin, a criminal who deals only with the top 1%
- Park Myung-hoon as Cha Dong-cheol, a criminal who survived a deal with the police
- Lee El as Seo Joong-ho
- Lee Hyun-wook as Kim Jeong-gyun, President of Daeho Group and the heir to the company
- Jang Seo-kyung as Min-jae's younger sister
- Lee Sung-woo as Team leader Han
- Son In-yong as detective
- Lim Chul-hyung as Sun Woo-bum

== Production ==
In July 2019 Cho Jin-woong and Choi Woo-shik were confirmed to appear in the film based on Japanese novel Blood of the Policeman by Joh Sasaki. They have worked together before in 2011 historical TV series Deep Rooted Tree. Park Myung-hoon joined the cast in January 2020. Choi Woo-shik and Park Hee-soon worked together in 2018 horror film The Witch: Part 1. The Subversion.

The film was shot in Ulsan in February 2020. The last leg of shooting was completed in the Nam District, Ulsan courthouse.

== Release ==
The film was released theatrically on January 5, 2022. It made it to 'Korean Cinema Today - Panorama' section of 27th Busan International Film Festival and was screened on October 6, 2022.

== Reception ==
=== Box office ===
The film was released on 1,184 screens on January 5, 2022. As per Korean Film Council (Kofic) integrated computer network, the film ranked at no. 2 at the Korean box office in the opening weekend with 374,432 cumulative admissions.

As of September 9, 2022 it is at 13th place among all the Korean films released in the year 2022, with gross of US$5.56 million and 679,503 admissions.

=== Critical response ===
Kim Mi-hwa of Star News praising the lead cast stated, "Cho Jin-woong and Choi Woo-shik, who are diametrically opposite in terms of appearance and character, brings joy to the viewers." She also praised the performances of supporting cast of Park Hee-soon, Kwon Yul, and Park Myung-hoon and wrote, "savory performances of various supporting actors breathe life into the film." Kim felt that the film "is a mix of stories of police, gangsters, and drugs familiar to Korean audiences." But she stated that "the new chemistry that comes out of them mixes with flavor like a seasoning." She criticised the sound quality, writing, "not being able to hear the lines well in some scenes even though the actors utter the lines clearly." Concluding she wondered, "[whether the film] will be able to captivate the audience with a delicious movie made with familiar ingredients."

== Awards and nominations ==
Award	Date of ceremony	Category	Recipient(s)	Result	Ref(s)
2022	31st Buil Film Awards	Best Actor	Cho Jin-woong	Nominated	
