= The Frog (South Korean TV series) =

2024 South Korean television series

- Promotional poster
- Hangul: 아무도 없는 숲속에서
- Lit.: In the Woods With No One Around
- RR: Amudo eomneun supsogeseo
- MR: Amudo ŏmnŭn supsogesŏ
- Genre: Mystery; Crime thriller
- Written by: Son Ho-young
- Directed by: Mo Wan-il
- Starring: Kim Yoon-seok; Yoon Kye-sang; Go Min-si; Lee Jung-eun
- Music by: Gaemi
- Country of origin: South Korea
- Original language: Korean
- No. of episodes: 8

Production
- Executive producers: Kim Ji-yeon (CP); Park Woo-ram; Ham Young-hoon; Jo Na-hyun
- Producers: Lee Yong-jae; Kim Ga-young
- Cinematography: Lee Yong-joo; Kang Moon-bong
- Editor: Jo Yoon-jung
- Running time: 49–68 minutes
- Production companies: SLL; Studio Flow

Original release
- Network: Netflix
- Release: August 23, 2024

The Frog (Korean: 아무도 없는 숲속에서) is a 2024 South Korean mystery crime thriller television series written by Son Ho-young, directed by Mo Wan-il, and starring Kim Yoon-seok, Yoon Kye-sang, Go Min-si, and Lee Jung-eun. The series depicts how a suspicious visitor disrupted the normal lives of ordinary people in the middle of summer. It was released on Netflix on August 23, 2024.

== Plot ==
The Frog unfolds in a secluded forest town, a few hours' drive from Seoul, where Jeon Yeong-ha has spent the last several years. Following his beloved wife's terminal illness, Yeong-ha moved to this tranquil location, fulfilling her dream of living in a beautiful, remote house surrounded by nature. After she died, he chose to remain in the town, residing in a modest home adjacent to the villa he now operates as a holiday rental. His daughter, Ui-seon, frequently urges him to return to Seoul to live with her and her fiancé, but Yeong-ha finds solace in managing the rental alongside his best friend, Yong-chae. However, Yeong-ha lacks the drive to fully commit to the business, relying on Yong-chae to encourage him to promote the property online to attract more guests.

Amidst this backdrop, a young woman named Seong-a arrives at the rental with her son, Si-hyeon. Though she carries an air of mystery and reserve, Yeong-ha welcomes them without hesitation. His sense of unease grows when Seong-a departs early the next morning, leaving behind disturbing blood stains and an overpowering scent of bleach, most alarmingly without her son in tow.

The narrative also weaves in a chilling incident from over twenty years ago at the Lake View Motel, run by Gu Sang-jun and his wife, Eun-gyeong. In the early 2000s, Sang-jun's hospitality took a dark turn when he invited a serious-looking man, later identified as the serial killer Hyang-cheol, to stay the night. Despite being off-season and desperate for business, Sang-jun offered the guest the best room at a nominal fee. This fateful decision shattered Sang-jun's life when Hyang-cheol committed a brutal murder within the motel's walls. Though the killer was apprehended swiftly, the motel's reputation suffered irreparable damage.

Officer Yoon Bo-min connects the two timelines. A skilled investigator, Bo-min began her career at the Hosu police station shortly before Hyang-cheol committed the murder. She witnessed the motel's decline and the effects of the crime on Sang-jun and his family. Years later, she returns to the same station as a senior officer and begins to take notice of Yeong-ha and his guest, Seong-a, as events surrounding them suggest a possible connection to the earlier case.

== Cast and characters ==
=== Main ===
- Kim Yoon-seok as Jeon Yeong-ha

Owner of a pension house.

- Yoon Kye-sang as Koo Sang-jun

Owner of a motel.

- Go Min-si as Yoo Seong-a

A mysterious woman.

- Lee Jung-eun as Yoon Bo-min
  - Ha Yoon-kyung as young Yoon Bo-min (special appearance)

A chief detective who investigates both Yeong-ha and Sang-jun's cases.

=== Supporting ===
- Kim Sung-ryung as Lee Seong-ran (special appearance)

Young-ha's wife, who died of cancer.

- Roh Yoon-seo as Jeon Ui-seon (special appearance)

Young-ha and Seong-ran's daughter, who is a pharmacist.

- Lee Nam-hee as Park Yong-chae
- Lee Sung-wook as Choi Kyung-nam
- Nam Ji-woo as Song Ji-soo
- Ryu Hyun-kyung as Seo Eun-gyeong

Sang-jun's wife and Gi-ho's mother.

- Cha Mi-kyung as Kim Kyung-ok

Jong-du's mother.

- Park Ji-hwan as Park Jong-du

Sang-jun's friend. He is an individual who walked a single path from the beginning of his life, went out to the city to live a wild life, and eventually quietly returned to his hometown.

- Hong Ki-joon as Ji Hyang-cheol

A serial killer who stayed in Sang-jun's motel.

- Chanyeol as Koo Gi-ho
  - Choi Jung-hoo as young Koo Gi-ho

Sang-jun's son.

- Jang Seung-jo as Ha Jae-sik (special appearance)

Seong-a's ex-husband.

- Jo Yeo-jun as Ha Si-hyun
- Lee Seung-cheol as Director Yoo
- Cho Ah-ra as Director Choi
- Kim Jong-tae as Detective Kang
- Ahn Sang-woo as Sergeant Choi
- Jo Eun-soul as Kim Seon-tae
- Lee Yoon-jae as Yeom Dong-chan
  - Lee Ga-sub as young Yeom Dong-chan
- Kim So-yul as Yeom Hee-won
- Joo In-young as a restaurant owner

== Episodes ==
No.	Title	Directed by	Written by	Original release date
1	"Do You Know What They Call People Like Us?"; Transliteration: "Uri gateun saramdeureul mworago haneunji aseyo?" (Korean: 우리 같은 사람들을 뭐라고 하는지 아세요?)	Mo Wan-il	Son Ho-young	August 23, 2024
2	"Who Will Come Knocking on the Door of My Destiny?"; Transliteration: "Unmyeongui muneul dudeuryeool ineun nugulkka" (Korean: 운명의 문을 두드려올 이는 누굴까)	Mo Wan-il	Son Ho-young	August 23, 2024
3	"As Though You Couldn't Get Me Off Your Mind"; Transliteration: "Machi geudongan gyesong naman saenggakan saramcheoreom" (Korean: 마치 그동안 계속 나만 생각한 사람처럼)	Mo Wan-il	Son Ho-young	August 23, 2024
4	"I Think She Killed a Child"; Transliteration: "Geu yeojaga aereul jugin geon gatayo" (Korean: 그 여자가 애를 죽인 것 같아요)	Mo Wan-il	Son Ho-young	August 23, 2024
5	"I'm Just "It" in This Game of Tag"; Transliteration: "Nan geunyang i jaeminneun noriui sullaemnida" (Korean: 난 그냥 이 재밌는 놀이의 술랩니다)	Mo Wan-il	Son Ho-young	August 23, 2024
6	"Dad Will Come Get You"; Transliteration: "Appaga geumbang da haegyeolhago derireo galge" (Korean: 아빠가 금방 다 해결하고 데리러 갈게)	Mo Wan-il	Son Ho-young	August 23, 2024
7	"We'll See the End Together"; Transliteration: "Nan mujogeon ajeossirang kkeutkkaji gal geogo" (Korean: 난 무조건 아저씨랑 끝까지 갈 거고)	Mo Wan-il	Son Ho-young	August 23, 2024
8	"We'll Have a Lot to Talk About"; Transliteration: "Urineun hal yaegiga aju mankenne" (Korean: 우리는 할 얘기가 아주 많겠네)	Mo Wan-il	Son Ho-young	August 23, 2024

== Production ==
=== Development ===
The series, which consists of eight episodes, is a collaboration between writer Son Ho-young, who won the Excellence Award in the Series category of the 2021 JTBC New Writers Playwriting Contest, and director Mo Wan-il, who directed Misty (2018) and The World of the Married (2020). It is co-produced by SLL and Studio Flow and released on Netflix in more than 190 countries.

=== Casting ===
Kim Yoon-seok, Yoon Kye-sang, and Go Min-si were reportedly cast for the series in 2022. Lee Jung-eun, Park Ji-hwan, and Ha Yoon-kyung were reportedly cast for the series in 2023. Chanyeol was cast by February 2024.

On February 20, 2023, Kim, Yoon, Go, and Lee were confirmed as the lead actors of the series.

== Release ==
Netflix confirmed The Frog to be released in the third quarter of 2024 after they announced the list of the annual Korean Slate of Films and Series on February 6. The series was released on August 23.

== Reception ==
=== Critical response ===
On the review aggregator website Rotten Tomatoes, 56% of 9 critics' reviews are positive, with an average rating of 5.7/10. Writing for The Korea Times, cultural critic and scholar David Tizzard described the drama as having great promise but ultimately failing to deliver on its early psychological explorations. Despite aiming to emulate things like The Shining or Parasite, it ended up as "Disney level morality dressed up in miniskirts and trying to be sexy for Netflix...a Tarantino soundtrack (something else it plays with) without the dialogue, wit, or tension." Tizzard did, however, acknowledge the influence the drama might have had on domestic Korean influences for the similarities the plot had with the case of Koh Yuh-jeong.

=== Listicles ===
Name of publisher, year listed, name of listicle, and placement
Publisher	Year	Listicle	Placement	Ref.
Cine21	2024	Top 10 Series of 2024	7th place (Note: Tied with Knight Flower.)	
NME	2024	The 10 best Korean dramas of 2024	4th place	
