= Nine Puzzles =

2025 South Korean television series

- Promotional poster
- Hangul: 나인 퍼즐
- RR: Nain peojeul
- MR: Nain p'ŏjŭl
- Genre: Mystery; Crime thriller
- Written by: Lee Eun-mi
- Directed by: Yoon Jong-bin; Kim Jung-ho
- Starring: Kim Da-mi; Son Suk-ku
- Music by: Jo Yeong-wook
- Opening theme: "Nine Puzzles" by: Jo Yeong-wook; Son Seung-il
- Country of origin: South Korea
- Original language: Korean
- No. of episodes: 11

Production
- Executive producers: Jang Hyung-ji; Kim Min-ji
- Producers: Yoon Jeong-bin; Jang Se-jeong; Choi Gyeong-suk
- Cinematography: Go Rak-seon
- Editors: Kim Sang-beom; Kim Ho-bin
- Production companies: Moonlight Film; Kakao Entertainment
- Budget: ₩30 billion

Original release
- Network: Disney+
- Release: May 21 – June 4, 2025

Nine Puzzles (Korean: 나인 퍼즐) is a South Korean mystery crime thriller television series written by Lee Eun-mi, directed by Yoon Jong-bin and Kim Jung-ho, and starring Kim Da-mi and Son Suk-ku. The series follows a ten-year-old cold case that involves a new string of baffling murders, all related to mysterious puzzles. It was released on Disney+ on May 21, 2025.

== Synopsis ==
As a high school student, Yoon E-na discovered her murdered uncle's body, with a peculiar puzzle piece found at the scene. As the only eyewitness, she found herself unable to recall how she ended up there, making her the primary suspect in the eyes of Detective Kim Han-saem. A decade later, E-na has become an exceptional criminal profiler, working for the Seoul Metropolitan Police Agency's criminal analysis team. However, she is still tormented by the unresolved murder of her uncle. A new wave of serial killings surfaces, each one accompanied by identical enigmatic puzzle pieces, echoing the incident that transformed her life. This prompts E-na to collaborate with Han-saem once more, who, despite their tense partnership, still carries doubts regarding her role in her uncle's murder case.

== Cast and characters ==
=== Main ===
- Kim Da-mi as Yoon E-na

A criminal profiler, working for the Seoul Metropolitan Police Agency's criminal analysis team.

- Son Suk-ku as Kim Han-saem

=== Supporting ===
- Park Gyu-young as Lee Seung-joo

A psychiatrist doctor therapist at Sunshine Mental Health Clinic

- Roh Jae-won as Hwang In-chan

Director at Sunshine Mental Health Medicine

- Kim Sung-kyun as Yang Jung-ho

Captain of Violent Crimes Unit 2 at Hangang Police Station.

- Hyun Bong-sik as Choi San
- Kwak Ja-hyung as Ro Su-gwang
- Kim Do-geon as one of police cadet.

=== Special appearances ===
- Ji Jin-hee as Yoon Dong-hoon

Yoon E-na's uncle and a former superintendent officer. He was killed in the beginning and his niece has been trying to uncover his death ever since.

- Park Sung-woong as Kwon Sang-beom
- Hwang Jung-min as Oh Cheol-jin
- Kim Ye-won as Lee Mi-young
- Lee Hee-joon as Kang Chi-mok
- Lee Sung-min as Do Yoon-su

== Production ==
=== Development ===
The series is directed by Yoon Jong-bin, who helmed and produced Nameless Gangster: Rules of the Time (2012), Kundo: Age of the Rampant (2014), The Spy Gone North (2018), and Narco-Saints (2022), written by Lee Eun-mi, who wrote Tunnel (2017) and Navillera (2021), and produced by Kakao Entertainment and Moonlight Film. The total budget of the series cost ₩30 billion.

=== Casting ===
According to Kakao Entertainment in May 2024, Kim Da-mi and Son Suk-ku were cast to lead the series and positively considering to appear.

== Release ==
Nine Puzzles which consists of 11 episodes, premiered its first six episodes on May 21, 2025, followed by three episodes on May 28, and the last two episodes on June 4.

== Reception ==
=== Critical response ===
On Rotten Tomatoes, 100% of 5 critics gave the series a positive review.

=== Viewership ===
In December 2025, Disney announced that Nine Puzzles was among the most-watched international original series released on Disney+ in 2025.

=== Accolades ===
Award ceremony	Year	Category	Nominee	Result	Ref.
Clio Entertainment Awards	2025	Motion Poster	Nine Puzzles Motion Poster: Memories of the Day	Won; Silver Award	
Global OTT Awards	2025	Best OTT Original	Nine Puzzles	Won	
Seoul International Drama Awards	2025	Best Actress	Kim Da-mi	Nominated	
