= Our Beloved Summer =

2021 South Korean television series

- Promotional poster
- Hangul: 그 해 우리는
- Lit.: That Year We
- RR: Geu hae urineun
- MR: Kŭ hae urinŭn
- Genre: Romantic comedy; Coming-of-age
- Created by: Studio N
- Developed by: Studio S
- Written by: Lee Na-eun
- Directed by: Kim Yoon-jin
- Starring: Choi Woo-shik; Kim Da-mi; Kim Sung-cheol; Roh Jeong-eui
- Music by: Nam Hye-seung
- Opening theme: "Our Beloved Summer" by Kim Kyung-hee
- Country of origin: South Korea
- Original language: Korean
- No. of episodes: 16

Production
- Executive producer: Park Young-soo (Studio S)
- Producers: Kwon Mi-kyung; Shin In-soo; Lee Hee-won; Kim Hyun-ji
- Running time: 60–70 minutes
- Production companies: Studio N; Super Moon Pictures

Original release
- Network: SBS TV
- Release: December 6, 2021 – January 25, 2022

Our Beloved Summer (Korean: 그 해 우리는) is a South Korean romantic comedy television series. Billed as "Studio N's first original series", it is directed by Kim Yoon-jin with screenplay by Lee Na-eun, starring Choi Woo-shik, Kim Da-mi, Kim Sung-cheol, and Roh Jeong-eui. The series is a coming-of-age story about a former couple who are forced to come together again when a documentary they shot in high school goes viral.

It premiered on SBS TV on December 6, 2021, and aired on Mondays and Tuesdays at 22:00 (KST) till January 25, 2022. It is available for streaming on Netflix. Despite disappointing ratings on domestic television it became widely popular internationally through streaming.

== Synopsis ==
A coming-of-age romantic comedy that revolves around Choi Ung (Choi Woo-shik) and Kook Yeon-soo (Kim Da-mi), ex-lovers who broke up with a promise to never meet again. As luck would have, it, the documentary they filmed ten years ago in high school went viral and they are forced to face the cameras together again by their producer friend. The series depicts their complicated feelings and growth.

This drama shows what love feels like. Instead of discussing practical issues like family conflicts, it tells a story about throb, memory and dream. Romance is revealed in many small, unnoticed acts.

== Cast ==
=== Main ===
- Choi Woo-shik as Choi Ung, 29 years old
  - Song Ha-hyun as young Choi Ung

A free-spirited building illustrator who goes by the pseudonym "Go-oh". He was the last ranked student in high school.

- Kim Da-mi as Kook Yeon-soo, 29 years old

A realistic PR expert. She is fiercely independent and is the type to not bother others about her feelings. She was the 1st ranked student in high school.

- Kim Sung-cheol as Kim Ji-ung, 29 years old
  - Kim Ji-hoon as young Kim Ji-ung

Choi Ung's best friend and a PD in charge of producing the documentary. He has a crush on Kook Yeon-Soo since high school.

- Roh Jeong-eui as NJ, 25 years old

A top idol who develops a friendship with Choi Ung and has a secret crush on him.

=== Supporting ===
==== People around Choi Ung ====
- Ahn Dong-goo as Gu Eun-ho, 27 years old

Choi Ung's manager and friend.

- Park Won-sang as Choi Ho, 56 years old

Choi Ung's father.

- Seo Jeong-yeon as Lee Yeon-ok, 53 years old

Choi Ung's mother.

- Jung Kang-Hee as Chang-sik

The owner of a hardware store and a neighborhood friend of Choi Ung's father.

==== People around Kook Yeon-soo ====
- Park Jin-joo as Lee Sol-yi, 30 years old

Kook Yeon-soo's best friend. She is a former writer and now owns a bar.

- Cha Mi-kyung as Kang Ja-kyung, 75 years old

Kook Yeon-soo's grandma.

==== People around Kim Ji-ung ====
- Jo Bok-rae as Park Dong-il, 39 years old

The team leader of the documentary production company. Ji-ung's direct senior and the PD of the original documentary.

- Jeon Hye-won as Jeong Chae-ran, 27 years old

Kim Ji-ung's junior and his closest colleague.

- Lee Seung-woo as Lim Tae-hoon, 27 years old

New PD who recently joined the broadcasting station. He is Kim Ji-ung's junior and an enthusiastic person.

- Lee Seon-hee as Lee Min-kyung

A documentary writer who joins Kim Ji-ung's team.

==== People around NJ ====
- Park Do-wook as Chi-seong, 33 years old

NJ's manager.

- Ahn Soo-bin as Ahn Mi-yeon, 31 years old

NJ's stylist.

==== RUN Company people ====
- Heo Jun-seok as Bang Yi-hoon, 40 years old

RUN Company's president.

- Park Yeon-woo as Kim Myung-ho, 28 years old

Planning team member.

- Yoon Sang-jeong as Ji Ye-in, 27 years old

Planning team member who sincerely respects Yeon-soo. She is knowledgeable and witty.

- Cha Seung-yeop as Kang Ji-woon, 26 years old

Planning team intern.

=== Special appearance ===
- Lee Joon-hyuk as Jang Do-yul

One of Yeon-soo's clients.

- Kwak Dong-yeon as Artist Nu-ah
- Kang Ki-doong as Jin-seop, Lee Sol-yi's ex-boyfriend.
- Park Mi-hyun as Kim Ji-ung's mother

== Production ==
The series reunites Choi Woo-shik and Kim Da-mi, who worked together in the 2018 mystery action film The Witch: Part 1. The Subversion. It also marks Studio N's first original drama.

=== Casting ===
In March 2021, Choi Woo-shik and Kim Da-mi were confirmed for the series. The rest of the lineup was confirmed on July 8.

=== Filming ===
Filming began in early July 2021.

== Release ==
Our Beloved Summer premiered on SBS TV on December 6, 2021, and aired on Mondays and Tuesdays at 22:00 (KST). It is also available for streaming on Netflix.

== Adaptation ==
A webtoon based on Our Beloved Summer is a prequel that depicts the high school days of the two main characters of the TV series (Choi Ung and Kook Yeon-soo) and was released on Naver Webtoon in 2021.

== Summary of each episode ==
No.	Title
1	"I Know What You Did Last Summer" (나는 네가 지난 여름에 한 일을 알고 있다)
A documentary which was taken in high school runs backwards, so the main characters, Choi Ung and Kook Yeon-soo, have to take a shot again.
2	"1792 Days of Summer" (1792일의 썸머)
Kook Yeon-soo visits Choi Ung' house to ask about working for her important project. However, their relationship is not the same as 5 years ago.
3	"10 Things I Hate About You" (내가 널 싫어하는 10가지 이유)
A documentary director who is friends with Choi Ung and Kook Yeon-soo suggests that the main characters take a documentary again, but they refuse the suggestion. Finally they decide to take a shot again because Choi Ung accepts the suggestion first, and he suggests shooting to Kook Yeon-soo.
4	"The Boy, or the Girl, I Liked Then" (그 시절, 우리가 좋아했던 소녀? 소년?)
Eventually, they start to take a shot, but the process of shooting is not smooth. The old memory which Chio Ung and Kook Yeon-soo have is distorted.
5	"A Secret That Can't Be Told" (말할 수 없는 비밀)
Misunderstanding arises between both of the main characters while they work together.
6	"Pride and Prejudice" (오만과 편견)
The project which Choi Ung and Kook Yeon-soo have worked on is finished well. The shooting makes them think about their relationship.
7	"Catch Me If You Can" (캐치미 이프 유 캔)
They run away from their shooting because an emotional problem is happening between them. However, they meet again in the library, and they eat a meal together.
8	"Before Sunset" (비포 선 셋)
The main characters, Choi Ung and Kook Yeon-soo, are kidnapped by a filming team to take a documentary continuously. Their relationship is changed throughout the shooting by changing their heart for each other.
9	"Just Friend" (저스트 프렌드)
After the kidnapping, Kook Yeon-soo is anxious that Choi Ung ignored her because her heart goes to him. Choi Ung thinks that he cannot live without Kook Yeon-soo, so he suggests that she be friends with him.
10	"Hello, My Soul Mate" (안녕, 나의 소울메이트)
After they become friends, they get closer and closer, but Kook Yeon-soo doesn't want to stay just friends with him because she realizes that she likes him again.
11	"Our Nights Are More Beautiful Than Your Days" (우리의 밤은 당신의 낮보다 아름답다)
Choi Ung is rumored to be dating a celebrity, so Kook Yeon-soo worries about it. He realizes that he always missed her and he loves her. They know each other's hearts.
12	"Begin Again" (비긴 어게인)
The shooting is finished, and Choi Ung and Kook Yeon-soo date again. However, their dating is not the same as 5 years ago because they become more adult.
13	"Love Actually" (Love Actually)
They love affectionately, and they make an effort to show new appearances to each other because they want to be better at each other.
14	"Life Is Beautiful" (인생은 아름다워)
They love each other, but they cannot remove the memory of break up. However, they overcome their sorrow, and they date lovely.
15	"Three Idiots" (세 얼간이)
Choi Ung and Kook Yeon-soo are in a beautiful relationship. Choi Ung holds an exhibition. However, Kook Yeon-soo's grandmother is sick, so she cannot visit his exhibition.
16	"Our Beloved Summer" (그 해 우리는)
Choi Ung wants to go abroad to study more, so he suggests Kook Yeon-soo to go abroad with him. However, Kook Yeon-soo wants to stay in Korea, so they have a long distance relationship. After that, when he returns, they get married in love.

== Original soundtrack ==
Our Beloved Summer OST Special

Soundtrack album by Various Artist
- Released: January 26, 2022
- Genre: Soundtrack
- Languages: Korean; English
- Labels: NHN Bugs; Most Content

=== Part 1 ===
Released on December 7, 2021
No.	Title	Lyrics	Music	Artist	Length
1.	"Drawer" (서랍)	Nam Hyeseung, Janet Suhh	Nam Hyeseung, Jeon Jonghyuk	Kwon Jung-yeol (10cm)	3:58
2.	"Drawer" (instrumental)				3:58

=== Part 2 ===
Released on December 13, 2021
No.	Title	Lyrics	Music	Artist	Length
1.	"Maybe If" (우리가 헤어져야 했던 이유)	Nam Hyeseung, Kim Kyunghee	Nam Hyeseung, Kim Kyunghee	Bibi	3:30
2.	"Maybe If" (instrumental)				3:30

=== Part 3 ===
Released on December 14, 2021
No.	Title	Lyrics	Music	Artist	Length
1.	"Squabble" (티격태격)	Nam Hyeseung, Park Jinho	Nam Hyeseung, Park Jinho	Ha Sung-woon	3:25
2.	"Squabble" (instrumental)				3:25

=== Part 4 ===
Released on December 21, 2021
No.	Title	Lyrics	Music	Artist	Length
1.	"There for You" (이별후회)	Nam Hyeseung, Kim Kyunghee	Nam Hyeseung, Kim Kyunghee	Kim Na-young	3:40
2.	"There for You" (instrumental)				3:40

=== Part 5 ===
Released on December 24, 2021
No.	Title	Lyrics	Music	Artist	Length
1.	"Christmas Tree"	Nam Hyeseung, Kim Kyung-hee	Nam Hyeseung, Kim Kyung-hee	V (BTS)	3:30
2.	"Christmas Tree" (instrumental)				3:30

=== Part 6 ===
Released on December 28, 2021
No.	Title	Lyrics	Music	Artist	Length
1.	"Home" (집)	Nam Hyeseung, Kim Kyunghee	Nam Hyeseung, Kim Kyunghee	Janet Suhh	3:52
2.	"Why"	Nam Hyeseung, Kim Kyunghee	Nam Hyeseung, Kim Kyunghee	Janet Suhh	3:39
3.	"Home" (instrumental)				3:52
4.	"Why" (instrumental)				3:39

=== Part 7 ===
Released on January 4, 2022
No.	Title	Lyrics	Music	Artist	Length
1.	"The Giving Tree" (언덕나무)	Nam Hyeseung, Park Jinho	Nam Hyeseung, Park Jinho	Lee Seung-yoon	4:11
2.	"The Giving Tree" (instrumental)				4:11

=== Part 8 ===
Released on January 10, 2022
No.	Title	Lyrics	Music	Artist	Length
1.	"Summer Rain" (여름비)	Nam Hyeseung, Kim Kyunghee	Nam Hyeseung, Kim Kyunghee	Sam Kim	3:21
2.	"Summer Rain" (instrumental)				3:21

=== Part 9 ===
Released on January 11, 2022
No.	Title	Lyrics	Music	Artist	Length
1.	"Even Now" (아직도 좋아해)	Nam Hyeseung, Park Jinho	Nam Hyeseung, Park Jinho	Yang Yo-seob (Highlight)	4:12
2.	"Even Now" (instrumental)				4:12

=== Part 10 ===
Released on January 18, 2022
No.	Title	Lyrics	Music	Artist	Length
1.	"I Will Make You Happy" (행복하게 해줄게)	Jang Beom-june	Jang Beom-june	Jang Beom-june	3:17
2.	"I Will Make You Happy" (instrumental)				3:17

=== Part 11 ===
Released on January 24, 2022
No.	Title	Lyrics	Music	Artist	Length
1.	"Our Beloved Summer"	Kim Kyunghee	Nam Hyeseung, Kim Kyunghee	Kim Kyung-hee	3:13
2.	"Red String of Fate" (우리가 다시 만날 수 밖에 없는 이)	Kim Kyunghee	Nam Hyeseung, Kim Kyunghee	Kim Kyung-hee	3:17
3.	"Our Beloved Summer" (instrumental)				3:13
4.	"Red String of Fate" (instrumental)				3:17

=== Chart performance ===
Title	Year	Peak positions	Remarks	Ref.
Title	Year	KOR	Remarks	Ref.
"Drawer" (10cm)	2022	23	Part 1	
"Maybe If" (Bibi)	2022	21	Part 2	
"Squabble" (Ha Sung-woon)	2022	159	Part 3	
"There For You" (Kim Na-young)	2022	30	Part 4	
"Christmas Tree" (V)	2022	18	Part 5	
"The Giving Tree" (Lee Seung-yoon)	2022	24	Part 7	
"Summer Rain" (Sam Kim)	2022	37	Part 8	
"Even Now" (Yang Yo-seob)	2022	94	Part 9	
"I Will Make You Happy" (Jang Beom-june)	2022	98	Part 10	

== Viewership ==
Despite disappointing ratings on domestic television it became widely popular internationally through streaming.

Our Beloved Summer : South Korea viewers per episode (thousands)

Season	Episode number																Average
Season	1	2	3	4	5	6	7	8	9	10	11	12	13	14	15	16	Average
1	N/A	N/A	N/A	680	759	920	856	1056	813	941	925	1181	904	931	901	1085	919

Source: Audience measurement performed nationwide by Nielsen Korea.

Average TV viewership ratings
Ep.	Original broadcast date	Title	Average audience share (Nielsen Korea)	
Ep.	Original broadcast date	Title	Nationwide	Seoul
1	December 6, 2021	"I Know What You Did Last Summer"	3.2% (28th)	3.4% (N/A)
2	December 7, 2021	"1792 Days of Summer"	2.6% (31st)	—N/a
3	December 13, 2021	"10 Things I Hate About You"	3.1% (28th)	3.8% (N/A)
4	December 14, 2021	"The Boy, or the Girl, I Liked Then"	3.3% (23rd)	3.6% (N/A)
5	December 20, 2021	"A Secret That Can't Be Told"	3.7% (23rd)	4.3% (19th)
6	December 21, 2021	"Pride and Prejudice"	4.0% (21st)	4.4% (19th)
7	December 27, 2021	"Catch Me If You Can"	3.7% (24th)	4.0% (N/A)
8	December 28, 2021	"Before Sunset"	4.3% (21st)	4.6% (19th)
9	January 3, 2022	"Just Friends"	3.6% (25th)	3.8% (N/A)
10	January 4, 2022	"Hello, My Soul Mate"	4.3% (20th)	4.2% (20th)
11	January 10, 2022	"Our Nights Are More Beautiful Than Your Days"	4.2% (20th)	4.6% (18th)
12	January 11, 2022	"Begin Again"	5.2% (18th)	5.5% (15th)
13	January 17, 2022	"Love Actually"	4.0% (22nd)	4.9% (19th)
14	January 18, 2022	"Life Is Beautiful"	4.1% (20th)	4.6% (17th)
15	January 24, 2022	"Three Idiots"	4.2% (20th)	4.9% (17th)
16	January 25, 2022	"Our Beloved Summer"	5.3% (16th)	5.9% (11th)
Average			3.9%	4.1%
In the table above, the blue numbers represent the lowest ratings and the red numbers represent the highest ratings.

== Accolades ==
=== Awards and nominations ===
Name of the award ceremony, year presented, category, nominee of the award, and the result of the nomination
Award ceremony	Year	Category	Nominee / Work	Result	Ref.
APAN Star Awards	2022	Excellence Award, Actor in a Miniseries	Choi Woo-shik	Nominated	
APAN Star Awards	2022	Best Couple Award	Choi Woo-shik with Kim Da-mi	Nominated	
Baeksang Arts Awards	2022	Best Screenplay	Lee Na-eun	Nominated	
SBS Drama Awards	2021	Director's Award	Choi Woo-shik	Won	
SBS Drama Awards	2021	Director's Award	Kim Da-mi	Won	
SBS Drama Awards	2021	Top Excellence Award for an Actor in a Mini-Series Romance/Comedy	Choi Woo-shik	Nominated	
SBS Drama Awards	2021	Top Excellence Award for an Actress in a Mini-Series Romance/Comedy	Kim Da-mi	Nominated	
SBS Drama Awards	2021	Best Couple Award	Choi Woo-shik & Kim Da-mi	Nominated	
SBS Drama Awards	2021	Best New Actress	Roh Jeong-eui	Won	
SBS Drama Awards	2021	Excellence Award for an Actor in a Mini-Series Romance/Comedy Drama	Kim Sung-cheol	Nominated	
SBS Drama Awards	2021	Excellence Award for an Actress in a Mini-Series Romance/Comedy Drama	Park Jin-joo	Nominated	
Seoul International Drama Awards	2022	Seoul Industry Promotion Agency Award	Our Beloved Summer	Won	

=== Listicles ===
Name of publisher, year listed, name of listicle, and placement
Publisher	Year	Listicle	Placement	Ref.
Entertainment Weekly	2025	The 21 best Korean shows on Netflix to watch now	Top 21	
