= Lee Ga-sub =

South Korean actor (born 1991)

- Born: December 28, 1991 (age 34); Busan, South Korea
- Education: Sejong University
- Occupation: Actor
- Years active: 2011–present
- Agent: Saram Entertainment

Korean name
- Hangul: 이가섭
- Hanja: 李家燮
- RR: I Gaseop
- MR: I Kasŏp
- Website: esaram.co.kr/en/leegasub

Lee Ga-sub (Korean: 이가섭; born December 28, 1991) is a South Korean actor.

== Filmography ==
=== Film ===
Year	Title	Korean Title	Role	Notes	Ref.
2011	Social Service Agent	복무태만			
2016	The Boys Who Cried Wolf	양치기들	Joon-Ho		
2017	The Seeds of Violence	폭력의 씨앗	Joo-Yong		
2018	Door Lock	도어락	Han Dong-Hoon		
2019	Family Affair	니나 내나	Jae-yoon		
2019	Noryangjin: The Exam Village	노량진	Seon-ki	Short Film	
2021	It's Been A Long Time	오랜만이다	Hyun-Soo		

=== Television series ===
Year	Title	Korean Title	Role	Notes	Ref.
2020	Stranger 2	비밀의 숲 시즌2	Song Ki-hyun		
2020	Zombie Detective	좀비탐정	Oh Hyeong-cheol	Cameo (Episode 2)	
2021	Jirisan	지리산	Kim Sol		

== Awards and nominations ==
Year	Award	Category	Nominated work	Result	Ref.
2017	Cine21 Film Awards	Best New Actor	The Seeds of Violence	Won	
2018	54th Baeksang Arts Awards	Best New Actor	The Seeds of Violence	Nominated	
2018	23rd Chunsa Film Art Awards	Best New Actor	The Seeds of Violence	Nominated	
2018	27th Buil Film Awards	Best New Actor	The Seeds of Violence	Nominated	
2018	55th Grand Bell Awards	Best New Actor	The Seeds of Violence	Won	
2018	2nd The Seoul Awards	Best New Actor	The Seeds of Violence	Nominated	
2018	39th Blue Dragon Film Awards	Best New Actor	The Seeds of Violence	Nominated	
2018	2018 Korea Best Star Awards	Best New Actor	The Seeds of Violence	Won	
