= Yoon Jong-bin =

South Korean film director

- Born: December 20, 1979 (age 46); Busan, South Korea
- Education: Chung-Ang University - Filmmaking
- Occupations: Film director; screenwriter

Korean name
- Hangul: 윤종빈
- Hanja: 尹鐘彬
- RR: Yun Jongbin
- MR: Yun Chongbin

Yoon Jong-bin (Korean: 윤종빈; born December 20, 1979) is a South Korean film director. He is best known for directing the feature films Nameless Gangster: Rules of the Time (2012), Kundo: Age of the Rampant (2014), and The Spy Gone North (2018). Yoon also expanded into television, directing the series Narco-Saints (2022) and Nine Puzzles (2025).

== Career ==
Yoon Jong-bin's Chung-Ang University graduation thesis film was The Unforgiven, which portrayed masculine codes in the Korean military with honesty and sensitivity. And despite its rough edges due to technical limitations and a low budget, the film was a smash hit at the 2005 Busan International Film Festival and won several awards, including the NETPAC. It went on to travel to a number of festivals, winning awards and international critical acclaim.

His sophomore effort Beastie Boys (also known as The Moonlight of Seoul) showed another side of men -- male hosts who serve female clients in discreet salons tucked into the affluent fashion districts of southern Seoul.

In his third film Nameless Gangster: Rules of the Time, Yoon tackled corruption among prosecutors and customs officers and their collusion with the mob in 1980–1990s Busan. Unlike his first two films, Yoon's gangster saga was popular at the box office and became one of the biggest domestic hits of 2012.

Yoon further explored the themes of injustice and violence in his fourth film Kundo: Age of the Rampant, a tale of 19th-century Joseon bandits who waged war against the nobility and corrupt government officials. When asked where he drew his inspiration from, Yoon answered, "I tapped into movies that I used to love as a child. Rather than making an intellectual film, I wanted to get hearts racing." By not giving the protagonist "hero-like characteristics," Yoon said he wanted to say through the film that "it is not the special or talented people, but very ordinary people who can change the world, especially when gathered en masse."

Yoon has worked with close friend and fellow Chung-Ang University alumnus Ha Jung-woo in all four of his features.

== Filmography ==
=== Film ===
Year	Title	Credited as		
Year	Title	Director	Writer	Producer
2004	Identification of a Man	Yes	Yes	No
2005	The Unforgiven	Yes	Yes	Yes
2008	Beastie Boys	Yes	Yes	No
2012	Nameless Gangster: Rules of the Time	Yes	Yes	No
2014	Kundo: Age of the Rampant	Yes	Yes	Yes
2015	A Violent Prosecutor	No	No	Yes
2018	The Spy Gone North	Yes	Yes	No
2019	Money	No	No	Yes
2020	The Closet	No	No	Yes
2022	Remember	No	Yes	Yes
2025	The Match	No	Yes	Yes

=== Acting performances ===
Year	Title	Role	Notes
2005	The Unforgiven	Heo Ji-hoon	
2008	Nowhere to Turn		Cameo
2012	Nameless Gangster: Rules of the Time	Photographer	Cameo
2013	The Berlin File	South Korean field analyst	Cameo
2016	A Quiet Dream	Jong-bin	

=== Television ===
Year	Title	Credited as		
Year	Title	Director	Writer	Producer
2022	Narco-Saints	Yes	Yes	No
2025	Karma	No	No	Yes
2025	Nine Puzzles	Yes	No	No

== Awards and nominations ==
Name of the award ceremony, year presented, category, nominee of the award, and the result of the nomination
Award ceremony	Year	Category	Nominee / Work	Result	Ref.
Asian Academy Creative Awards	2023	Best Direction – Fiction (National Winners – Korea)	Narco-Saints	Won	
Baeksang Arts Awards	2018	Best Film	The Spy Gone North	Won	
Baeksang Arts Awards	2018	Best Director – Film	The Spy Gone North	Nominated	
Baeksang Arts Awards	2018	Best Screenplay – Film (Note: with Kwon Sung-hwi)	The Spy Gone North	Nominated	
Blue Dragon Film Awards	2018	Best Film	The Spy Gone North	Nominated	
Blue Dragon Film Awards	2018	Best Director	The Spy Gone North	Won	
Blue Dragon Film Awards	2018	Best Screenplay	The Spy Gone North	Nominated	
Buil Film Awards	2018	Best Film	The Spy Gone North	Won	
Buil Film Awards	2018	Best Director	The Spy Gone North	Nominated	
Buil Film Awards	2018	Best Screenplay	The Spy Gone North	Won	
Director's Cut Awards	2023	Best Director in Television	Narco-Saints	Won	
Director's Cut Awards	2023	Best Screenplay	Narco-Saints	Won	
Grand Bell Awards	2018	Best Film	The Spy Gone North	Nominated	
Grand Bell Awards	2018	Best Director	The Spy Gone North	Nominated	
Grand Bell Awards	2018	Best Screenplay	The Spy Gone North	Nominated	
Grand Bell Awards	2018	Best Planning	The Spy Gone North	Nominated	
Korean Association of Film Critics Awards	2018	Top 11 Films	The Spy Gone North	Won	
Korean Association of Film Critics Awards	2018	Best Director	The Spy Gone North	Won	
Korea Culture and Entertainment Awards	2018	Best Film	The Spy Gone North	Won	
Korea Culture and Entertainment Awards	2018	Best Director	The Spy Gone North	Won	
Korea Top Star Awards	2018	Director Award	The Spy Gone North	Won	
KOFRA Film Awards	2018	Best Film	The Spy Gone North	Won	
The Seoul Awards	2018	Best Film	The Spy Gone North	Won	
