= Kim Da-mi =

South Korean actress (born 1995)

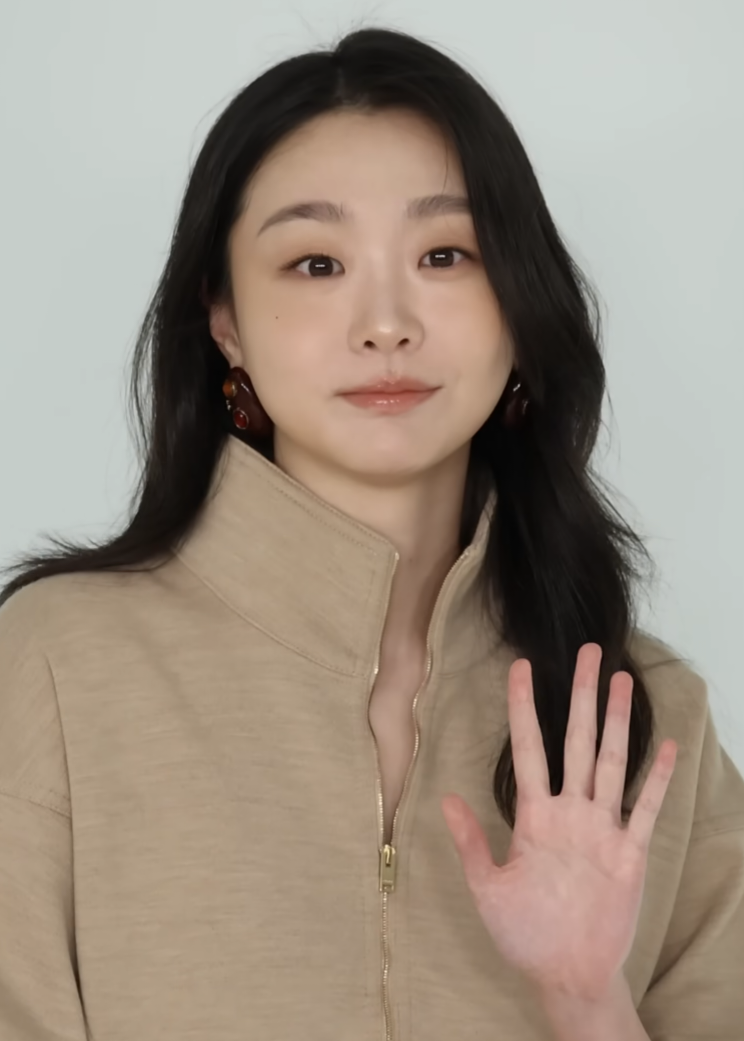
- Kim in May 2026
- Born: April 9, 1995 (age 31); Seoul, South Korea
- Education: Incheon National University (Performing Arts)
- Occupation: Actress
- Years active: 2018–present
- Agent: United Artists Agency

Korean name
- Hangul: 김다미
- RR: Gim Dami
- MR: Kim Tami

Kim Da-mi (Korean: 김다미; born April 9, 1995) is a South Korean actress. She first gained recognition for playing the titular character in Park Hoon-jung's action-mystery film The Witch: Part 1. The Subversion (2018) and came to further prominence for starring in the television series Itaewon Class (2020) and Our Beloved Summer (2021–2022).

== Career ==
Kim made her acting debut through the independent film 2017 Project With The Same Name, an omnibus feature film produced annually, playing the role of a woman who was recently involved in a breakup in the episode "Hello, My Hard Work".

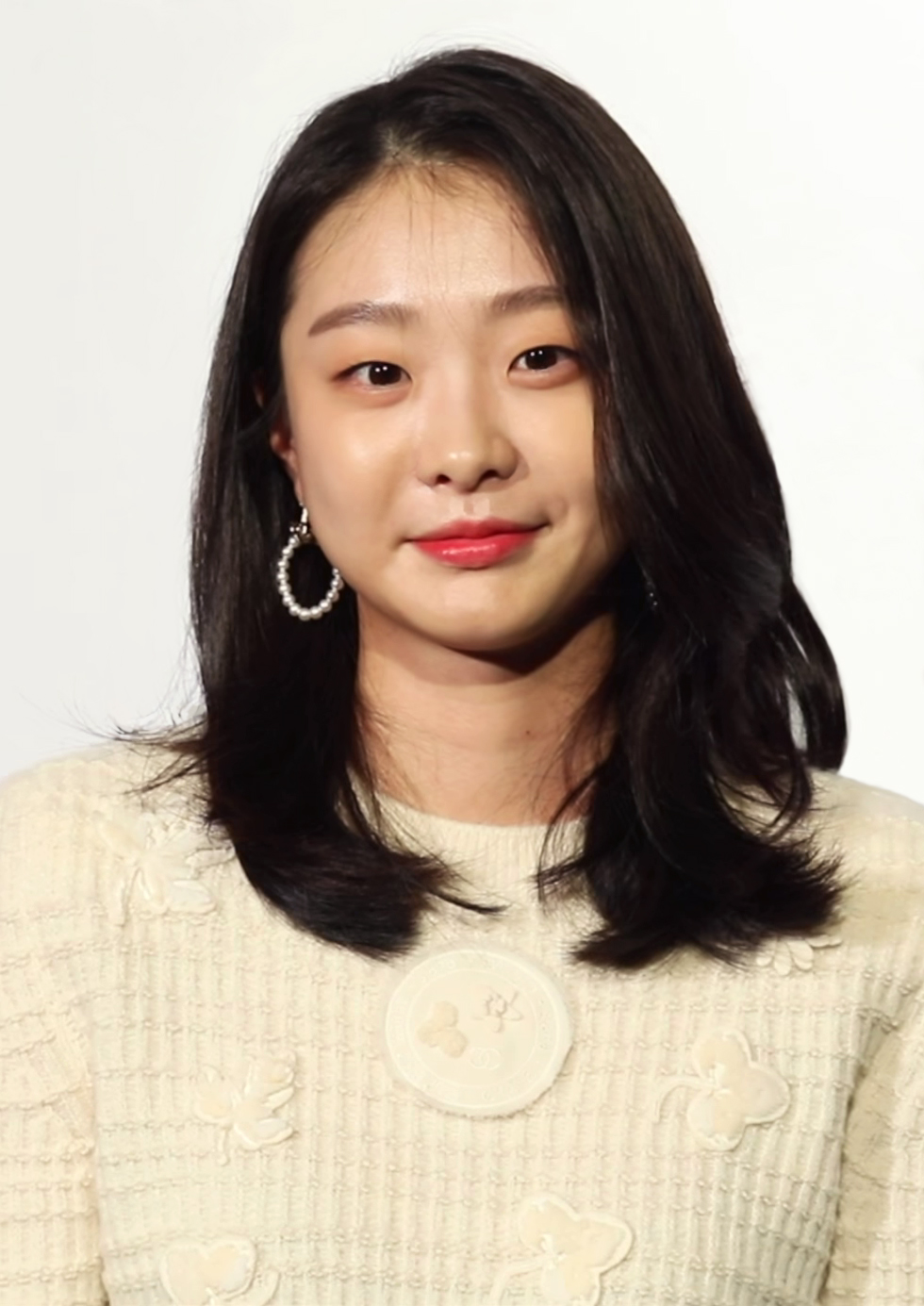
Kim in August 2018

In 2018, Kim played the role of a high school student in mystery thriller film Marionette. The same year, she played the lead role of Koo Ja-yoon in the action-mystery film The Witch: Part 1. The Subversion, directed by Park Hoon-jung, where she was chosen from among 1,500 candidates who auditioned for the role. She received universal acclaim for her strong performance in a challenging role that included intense fighting scenes, and winning a large number of newcomer awards. Thanks to the success and popularity of The Witch: Part 1. The Subversion, a sequel is scheduled to be produced.

In 2020, Kim made her television debut in the JTBC television series Itaewon Class, based on the webtoon of the same title. For her performance in the drama, she won the Best New Actress (TV) Award at 56th Baeksang Arts Awards. In March 2021, Kim was confirmed to join the SBS drama Our Beloved Summer with Choi Woo-shik, which premiered in December 2021. The drama reunited Kim with Choi after The Witch: Part 1. The Subversion (2018).

In May 2022, Kim decided not to renew her contract with ANDMARQ. Later in August, Kim signed with United Artists Agency.

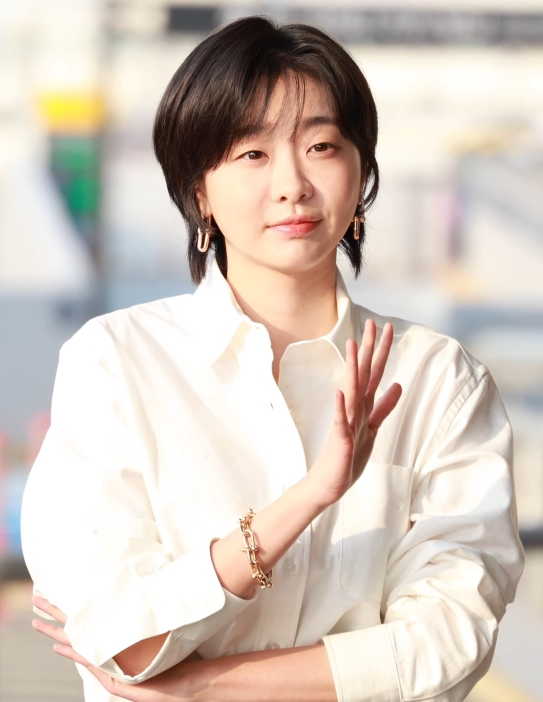
Kim in April 2024

Kim starred in the mystery crime thriller television series Nine Puzzles in 2025 alongside Son Suk-ku. She played a criminal profiler for the Seoul Metropolitan Police Agency. In the same year, she led JTBC's coming-of-age romance series A Hundred Memories as a bus hostess in the 1980s.

== Filmography ==
=== Film ===
Year	Title	Role	Notes	Ref.
2018	Marionette	Yoo Min-ah		
2018	2017 Project With The Same Name	—N/a	Omnibus film	
2018	The Witch: Part 1. The Subversion	Koo Ja-yoon		
2022	The Witch: Part 2. The Other One	Koo Ja-yoon	Special appearance	
2023	Soulmate	Ahn Mi-so		
2025	The Great Flood	Gu An-na / Dr. Anna		

=== Television series ===
Year	Title	Role	Ref.
2020	Itaewon Class	Jo Yi-seo	
2021–2022	Our Beloved Summer	Kook Yeon-su	
2025	Nine Puzzles	Yoon E-na	
2025	A Hundred Memories	Go Young-rye	

=== Television show ===
Year	Title	Role	Notes	Ref.
2021	Off the Grid	Main Cast	Episode 1-2	

=== Music video appearances ===
Year	Song title	Artist	Ref.
2022	"First Love" (처음 사랑해)	Jukjae	

== Accolades ==
=== Awards and nominations ===
Name of the award ceremony, year presented, category, nominee of the award, and the result of the nomination
Award ceremony	Year	Category	Nominee / Work	Result	Ref.
APAN Star Awards	2021	Best New Actress	Itaewon Class	Nominated	
APAN Star Awards	2021	Popular Star Award, Actress	Itaewon Class	Nominated	
APAN Star Awards	2022	Best Couple	Kim Da-mi with Choi Woo-shik; Our Beloved Summer	Nominated	
Asia Artist Awards	2018	Rookie Award	The Witch: Part 1. The Subversion	Won	
Asia Artist Awards	2020	Popularity Award (Actress)	Kim Da-mi	Nominated	
Baeksang Arts Awards	2019	Best New Actress – Film	The Witch: Part 1. The Subversion	Nominated	
Baeksang Arts Awards	2020	Best New Actress – Television	Itaewon Class	Won	
Blue Dragon Film Awards	2018	Best New Actress	The Witch: Part 1. The Subversion	Won	
Brand Customer Loyalty Award	2022	Best Actress	Kim Da-mi	Won	
Buil Film Awards	2018	Best New Actress	The Witch: Part 1. The Subversion	Won	
Chunsa Film Art Awards	2019	Best New Actress	The Witch: Part 1. The Subversion	Nominated	
Director's Cut Awards	2018	Best New Actress	The Witch: Part 1. The Subversion	Won	
Elle Style Awards	2018	Elle Next Icon	Kim Da-mi	Won	
Fantasia International Film Festival	2018	Cheval Noir Award for Best Actress	The Witch: Part 1. The Subversion	Won	
Grand Bell Awards	2018	Best Actress	The Witch: Part 1. The Subversion	Nominated	
Grand Bell Awards	2018	Best New Actress	The Witch: Part 1. The Subversion	Won	
Korea First Brand Awards	2020	Best New Actress	Itaewon Class	Won	
KOFRA Film Awards	2019	Best New Actress	The Witch: Part 1. The Subversion	Won	
Korea Youth Film Festival	2018	Popular New Actress	The Witch: Part 1. The Subversion	Won	
Korea Youth Film Festival	2019	Popular New Actress	The Witch: Part 1. The Subversion	Won	
London Asian Film Festival	2018	Rising Star Award	The Witch: Part 1. The Subversion	Won	
Marie Claire Asia Star Awards	2018	Rising Star Award	The Witch: Part 1. The Subversion	Won	
Olleh TV Movie of the Year Awards	2019	Big 6 Actor	The Witch: Part 1. The Subversion	Won	
SBS Drama Awards	2021	Director's Award	Our Beloved Summer	Won	
SBS Drama Awards	2021	Top Excellence Award, Actress in a Mini-Series (Romance/Comedy)	Our Beloved Summer	Nominated	
SBS Drama Awards	2021	Best Couple Award	Kim Da-mi with Choi Woo-shik; Our Beloved Summer	Nominated	
Seoul International Drama Awards	2025	Best Actress	Nine Puzzles	Nominated	
The Seoul Awards	2018	Best New Actress	The Witch: Part 1. The Subversion	Won	

=== Listicles ===
Name of publisher, year listed, name of listicle, and placement
Publisher	Year	Listicle	Placement	Ref.
Cine21	2020	New Actress to watch out for in 2021	5th (Note: Tied with Go Min-si, Kim Se-jeong, Park Gyu-young, Park Hye-su, and Jeong Su-jeong)	
Cine21	2020	Actress to watch out for in 2021	4th	
Cine21	2024	"Korean Film NEXT 50" – Actors	Placed	
Korean Film Council	2021	Korean Actors 200 (Note: The list introduces the 200 actors that best represent the present and future of Korean cinema to the people in the film industry all over the world.)	Placed	
