= The Sheriff in Town =

The Sheriff In Town
- Theatrical release poster
- Hangul: 보안관
- Hanja: 保安官
- RR: Boangwan
- MR: Poan'gwan
- Directed by: Kim Hyung-ju
- Written by: Kim Hyung-ju
- Produced by: Kang Hyun; Son Sang-bum; Han Jae-duk
- Starring: Lee Sung-min; Cho Jin-woong; Kim Sung-kyun
- Cinematography: Lee Chang-jae
- Edited by: Kim Sang-bum; Kim Jae-bum
- Music by: Jo Yeong-wook
- Production companies: Sanai Pictures; Moonlight Film
- Distributed by: Lotte Entertainment
- Release date: May 3, 2017
- Running time: 115 minutes
- Country: South Korea
- Language: Korean
- Box office: US$19 million

The Sheriff In Town (Korean: 보안관) is a 2017 South Korean crime comedy film directed by Kim Hyung-ju. The film stars Lee Sung-min, Cho Jin-woong and Kim Sung-kyun.

== Plot ==
Dae-ho is an ex-cop who is forced to quit his job when an impulsive bust left his partner stabbed and a major felon on the run. Five years have passed since that incident, and now Dae-ho runs a humble restaurant in his hometown Gijang. Never one to question his own superior strength, smarts and righteousness, Dae-ho has appointed himself the unofficial "sheriff" of the village, and assembled a dubious posse of locals to keep an eye on things. So when a face from Dae-ho's past re-emerges, claiming to have left crime behind and promising great things for the town, Dae-ho has his suspicions, and he is going to act on them.

== Cast ==
- Lee Sung-min as Dae-ho
- Cho Jin-woong as Jong-jin
- Kim Sung-kyun as Duk-man
- Kim Jong-soo as Yong-hwan
- Jo Woo-jin as Seon-cheol
- Lim Hyun-sung as Kang-gon
- Bae Jung-nam as Choon-mo
- Kim Hye-eun as Mi-seon
- Kim Byeong-ok as Chief Kang
- Kim Kwang-gyoo as Subsection chief Park
- Hiromitsu Takeda as Takeshi
- Son Yeo-eun as Hee-soon
- Kim Jae-young as Kwak Jeon-moo
- Kang Eun-ah as Na-yeong
- Noh Kang-min as Seung-hyeon
- Choi Moon-kyung as Detective Jo's wife
- Jung Man-sik as Il-sik (cameo)
- Kim Jong-goo as Seon-cheol's father (special appearance)
- Joo Jin-mo as Ship captain Park (special appearance)
- Lee Il-jae as Deputy assistant commissioner (special appearance)
- Baek Seung-hyeon as Detective Jo (special appearance)
- Kim Hong-pa as Real estate director Yoon (special appearance)
