= The Unforgiven (2005 film) =

2005 film

- Film poster
- Directed by: Yoon Jong-bin
- Written by: Yoon Jong-bin
- Produced by: Yoon Jong-bin
- Starring: Ha Jung-woo; Seo Jang-won
- Cinematography: Kim Byung-chul
- Edited by: Kim Woo-il
- Production companies: A&D Pictures
- Distributed by: Chungeorahm
- Release date: 18 November 2005
- Running time: 121 minutes
- Country: South Korea
- Language: Korean
- Box office: US$66,459

The Unforgiven (Korean: 용서받지 못한 자; RR: Yongseobatji mothan ja) is a 2005 South Korean drama film directed by Yoon Jong-bin. Turning painful experiences of his own compulsory military service into a narrative of three young men, director Yoon presses the hot-button issue of military service in contemporary South Korea. Yoon's controversial exposé of psychological and physical violence within the ranks stimulated a national dialogue on the subject.

== Plot ==
Lee Seung-young is a new recruit in the South Korean military who serves under commanding officer Sergeant Yoo Tae-jeong, an old school friend. Yoo looks after Lee, and tries to help the stubborn and contrarian youngster adjust to the strict hierarchies and harshness of military life. As time passes, Lee's resistance wears down, and he finds himself understanding and even becoming more like the superior officers he previously struggled against. Matters come to a head when he is given command of Heo Ji-hoon, a slovenly newcomer whose constant incompetence tests Lee's patience, and eventually forces him to act.

== Cast ==
- Ha Jung-woo as Yoo Tae-jeong
- Seo Jang-won as Lee Seung-young
- Yoon Jong-bin as Heo Ji-hoon
- Lim Hyun-sung as Soo-dong
- Han Sung-chun as Dae-seok
- Sohn Sang-bum as Young-il
- Kim Sung-mi as Ji-hye
- Joo Hyun-woo as Senior 1
- Park Min-kwan as Sergeant
- Seo Jung-joon as Casher
- Kim Byung-joon as Drunken Man
- Lee Soo-min as Soo-hyun (credited as Lee Hye-min)

== Reception ==
The Unforgiven was a feature-length graduation thesis film from director Yoon Jong-bin, then an undergraduate in Chung-Ang University film school. Despite its rough edges due to technical limitations and a low budget, the film was a smash hit at the 2005 Busan International Film Festival and won the following awards: Best Korean Feature, Most Popular Film in the New Currents section, FIPRESCI, and NETPAC ("for its critical reflection on 'masculinity', not only in South Korea or the military, but in contemporary society in general"). This generated wide publicity for the film, giving it a chance to be shown at respectable arthouse theaters in Seoul. Unfortunately, director Yoon found himself the object of litigation by the Defense Department, when the film turned out to be a far cry from the heartwarming "story of friendship inside the barracks" the Defense Department had apparently read in screenplay form, before they granted Yoon permission to shoot his film inside the authentic living quarters. Yoon acknowledged his act of deception and stated that he will accept the appropriate punishment.

Not only does the film deal with the difficult and formerly taboo subject of mandatory military service in South Korea, but it does so with an admirable level of thoughtfulness and honesty. Koreanfilm.org describes the film's last scene as "one of the most painfully honest renderings of young Korean men seen in a Korean film, whose souls are eaten away by the price they paid for having 'adjusted' themselves to become good soldiers and upstanding 'real men'. The Unforgiven is a must-see for anyone who seeks to gain insight into the inner psychology of South Korean men, and a stupendously promising debut for yet another talented Korean filmmaker."

The film also screened in the Un Certain Regard section of the 2006 Cannes Film Festival.

== Awards and nominations ==
Year	Award	Category	Recipients	Result
2005	25th Korean Association of Film Critics Awards	Best New Actor	Ha Jung-woo	Won
2005	8th Director's Cut Awards	Best New Actor	Ha Jung-woo	Won
2005	Cine 21 Awards	Best New Actor	Ha Jung-woo	Won
2006	42nd Baeksang Arts Awards	Best New Actor	Ha Jung-woo	Nominated
2006	42nd Baeksang Arts Awards	Best New Director	Yoon Jong-bin	Nominated
2006	27th Blue Dragon Film Awards	Best New Director	Yoon Jong-bin	Nominated
2006	27th Blue Dragon Film Awards	Best New Actor	Ha Jung-woo	Nominated
2006	5th Korean Film Awards	Best New Actor	Ha Jung-woo	Nominated
2006	2nd Pyeongtaek Film Festival	New Currents Best Actor	Ha Jung-woo	Won
