= 55th Grand Bell Awards =

2018 edition of award ceremony

- Official poster
- Date: October 22, 2018
- Site: Sejong University Convention Center, Seoul
- Hosted by: Shin Hyun-joon; Kim Gyu-ri

Television coverage
- Network: TV Chosun

The 55th Grand Bell Awards (Korean: 대종상 영화제; RR: Daejongsang Yeonghwajae), also known as Daejong Film Awards, is determined and presented annually by The Motion Pictures Association of Korea for excellence in film in South Korea. The Grand Bell Awards were first presented in 1962 and have gained prestige as the Korean equivalent of the American Academy Awards.

The ceremony was held at the Sejong University Convention Center in Seoul on October 22, 2018, and hosted by Shin Hyun-joon and Kim Gyu-ri.

== Nominations and winners ==
Nominations were announced September 21, 2018.

Best Film	Best Director
Burning; The Spy Gone North; The Fortress; Along with the Gods: The Last 49 Days; 1987: When the Day Comes	Jang Joon-hwan - 1987: When the Day Comes; Kim Yong-hwa - Along with the Gods: The Last 49 Days; Yoon Jong-bin - The Spy Gone North; Lee Chang-dong - Burning; Hwang Dong-hyuk - The Fortress
Best Actor	Best Actress
Hwang Jung-min - The Spy Gone North as Park Seok-young; Lee Sung-min - The Spy Gone North as Ri Myung-woon; Kim Yoon-seok - 1987: When the Day Comes as Park Cheo-won; Lee Byung-hun - The Fortress as Choi Myeong-gil; Yoo Ah-in - Burning as Lee Jong-su; Cho Jin-woong - Believer as Jo Won-ho	Na Moon-hee - I Can Speak as Na Ok-bun; Kim Da-mi - The Witch: Part 1. The Subversion as Ja-yoon; Kim Tae-ri - 1987: When the Day Comes as Yeon-hee; Kim Hae-sook - Herstory as Bae Jung-gil; Esom - Microhabitat as Jung Mi-so
Best Supporting Actor	Best Supporting Actress
Kim Joo-hyuk - Believer as Jin Ha-rim; Gi Ju-bong - The Spy Gone North as Kim Jong Il; Song Sae-byeok - Seven Years of Night as Ahn Seung-hwan; Steven Yeun - Burning as Ben; Jin Seon-kyu - The Outlaws as Wi Seong-rak	Jin Seo-yeon - Believer as Bo-ryeong; Go Min-si - The Witch: Part 1. The Subversion as Do Myung-hee; Kim Sae-byuk - Adulthood as supervisor of guardianship; Kim Sun-young - Herstory as Shin; Jung Yoo-mi - Psychokinesis as Hong
Best New Actor	Best New Actress
Lee Ga-sub - The Seeds of Violence as Lee Ju-yong; Go Sung-wan - Loser's Adventure as Sang-gyu; Oh Seung-hoon - Method as Young-woo; Wi Ha-joon - Gonjiam: Haunted Asylum as Ha-joon; Jung Ga-ram - The Poet and the Boy as Se-yun	Kim Da-mi - The Witch: Part 1. The Subversion as Ja-yoon; Kim Ka-hee - Park Hwa-young as Park Hwa-young; Jeon Jong-seo - Burning as Shin Hae-mi; Jin Ki-joo - Little Forest as Joo Eun-sook; Lee Jae-in - Adulthood as Hwang Gyeong-eon
Best New Director	Best Screenplay
Jeon Go-woon - Microhabitat; Lim Dae-hyung - Merry Christmas Mr. Mo; Kang Yoon-sung - The Outlaws; Shin Dong-suk - Last Child; Lee Seok-geun - On Your Wedding Day	Jeon Go-woon - Microhabitat; Kwon Sung-hwi, Yoon Jong-bin - The Spy Gone North; Hwang Dong-hyuk - The Fortress; Yoo Seung-hee - I Can Speak; Kim Kyung-chan - 1987: When the Day Comes; Kim In-sun, Park Geun-beom - Adulthood
Best Cinematography	Best Editing
Kim Ji-yong - The Fortress; Choi Chan-min - The Spy Gone North; Kim Tae-kyung - Believer; Hong Kyung-pyo - Burning; Kim Woo-hyung - 1987: When the Day Comes	Kim Hyung-joo, Yang Dong-yeop - Gonjiam: Haunted Asylum; Kim Sang-bum, Kim Jae-bum - The Spy Gone North; Nam Na-young - The Fortress; Kim Jin-oh, Kim Hye-jin - Along with the Gods: The Last 49 Days; Yang Jin-mo - 1987: When the Day Comes
Best Art Direction	Best Lighting
Park Il-hyun - The Spy Gone North; Chae Kyung-sun - The Fortress; Lee Ha-joon - Believer; Lee Mok-won - Along with the Gods: The Last 49 Days; Jo Hwa-sung - Illang: The Wolf Brigade	Jo Kyu-young - The Fortress; Yoo Suk-moon - The Spy Gone North; Kim Chang-ho - Burning; Lee Sung-hwan - Illang: The Wolf Brigade; Kim Seung-kyu - 1987: When the Day Comes
Best Costume Design	Best Music
Jo Sang-kyung - Illang: The Wolf Brigade; Chae Kyung-hwa - The Spy Gone North; Jo Sang-kyung - The Fortress; Jo Sang-kyung - Along with the Gods: The Last 49 Days; Chae Kyung-hwa, Lee Eun-yi - 1987: When the Day Comes	Ryuichi Sakamoto - The Fortress; Dalpalan - Believer; Mowg - Burning; Bang Joon-seok - Sunset in My Hometown; Kim Tae-seong - 1987: When the Day Comes
Technical Award	Best Planning
Jin Jong-hyun - Along with the Gods: The Last 49 Days; The Spy Gone North; Believer; The Witch: Part 1. The Subversion; Illang: The Wolf Brigade	Lee Woo-jung - 1987: When the Day Comes; Gonjiam: Haunted Asylum; The Spy Gone North; The Outlaws; Along with the Gods: The Last 49 Days
Woori Bank Star Award	Special Award
Kim Seol-hyun	Kim Joo-hyuk
