= Go Min-si =

South Korean actress (born 1995)

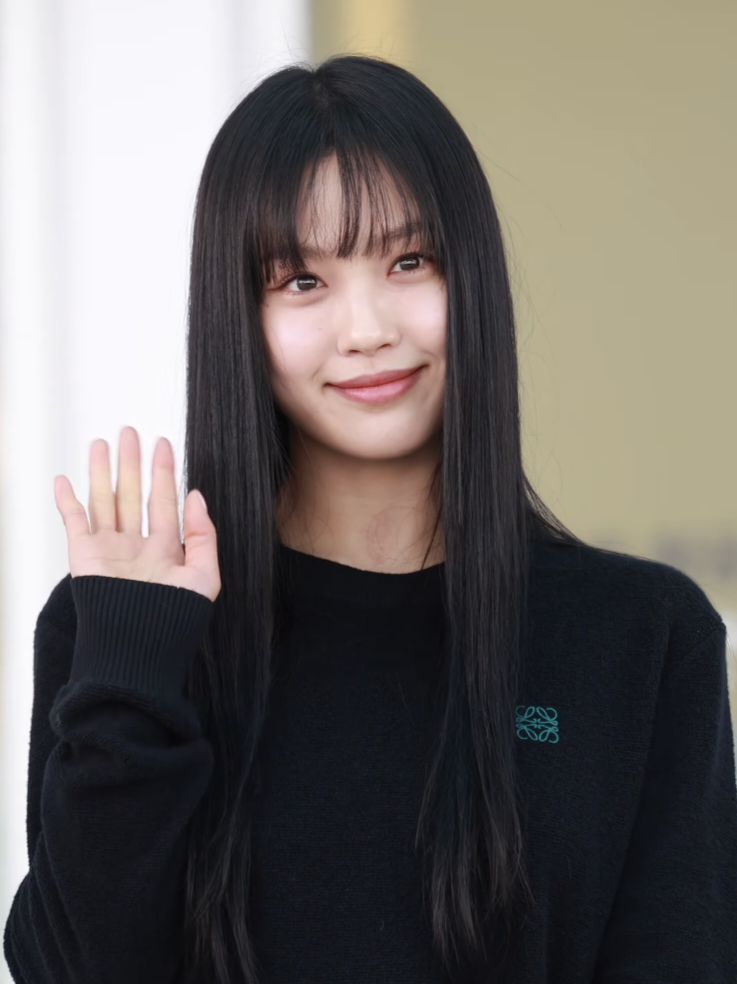
- Go in March 2025
- Born: February 15, 1995 (age 31); Daejeon, South Korea
- Occupations: Actress; model; director
- Years active: 2016–present
- Agent: Mystic Story
- Height: 165 cm (5 ft 5 in)

Korean name
- Hangul: 고민시
- Hanja: 高旻示
- RR: Go Minsi
- MR: Ko Minsi

Go Min-si (Korean: 고민시; born February 15, 1995) is a South Korean actress, model, and director managed by Mystic Story Entertainment. She is known for her prominent roles in television series such as Love Alarm (2019–2021), Sweet Home (2020–2023), Youth of May (2021), as well as the films The Witch: Part 1. The Subversion (2018) and Smugglers (2023).

== Career ==
Go Min-si made her directorial debut in the 2016 film Parallel Novel in which she co-starred and for which she won the Grand Prize during the Three Minutes Film Festival. The same year, she gained popularity after appearing in the third season of the web series 72 Seconds. She also appeared in the music video of "Sign" by Thunder.

In 2017, Go was cast in the web series Absolutely Perfect Man. She also made her television debut in the historical drama My Sassy Girl, before appearing in the youth drama Hello, My Twenties! 2 and in the fantasy drama Meloholic.

In 2018, Go made a cameo appearance in the comedy television series Welcome to Waikiki and in the drama Live. She also joined the cast of Forgotten Season, which is the second series of KBS Drama Special's ninth season, and the mystery thriller series The Smile Has Left Your Eyes. She appeared in the film Cheese in the Trap, which is an adaptation of the series of the same name, and in The Witch: Part 1. The Subversion. For the latter, she was nominated for Best Supporting Actress at the 55th Grand Bell Awards and she won the Popular Star Award at the 7th Korea Best Star Awards.

In 2019, Go took on the role of Hwaja, the protagonist's sister, in the Korean-Japanese period action film The Battle: Roar to Victory. She accepted a supporting role in the Netflix series Love Alarm in which she portrayed the lead character's cousin. Go also appeared in the thriller television series Secret Boutique for which she won Best New Actress at the 2019 SBS Drama Awards.

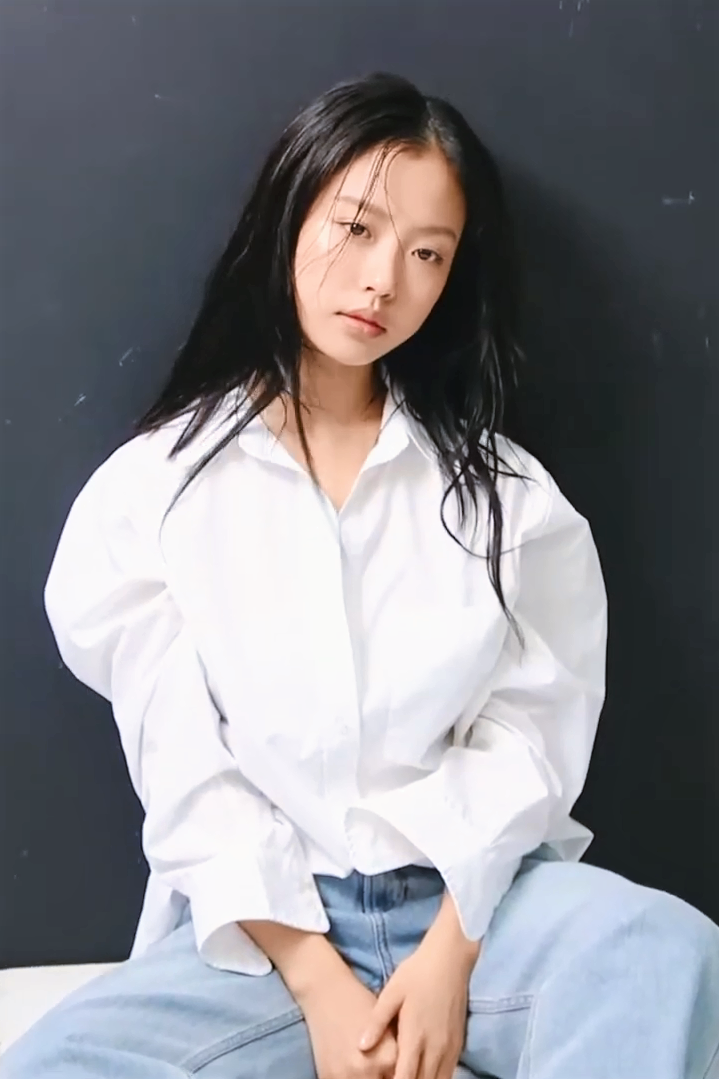
Go for Marie Claire Korea in 2020

In 2020, Go appeared in the KBS Drama Special The Reason Why I Can't Tell You, in the drama film Set Play and in the Netflix series Sweet Home, adapted from the webtoon of the same name.

In 2021, Go starred in KBS2's Youth of May, a drama set in 1980 during the Gwangju Uprising. The same year, she appeared in the mystery action series Jirisan, reuniting her with director Lee Eung-bok after Sweet Home. In 2023, Go starred in the film Smugglers.

In 2022, Go starred in the web series Reincarnation Romance, a short web series advertising about motion sickness pills. This is her third reunion with Lee Do-hyun.

In 2024, she also starred in the Netflix series The Frog. For her portrayal of Yoo Seong-ah in the drama, she was nominated for Best Actress – Television at 61st Baeksang Arts Awards in the following year.

On October 17, 2024, it was reported that Go will lead a romance drama Tastefully Yours. It is set to premiere in the first half of 2025.

== Philanthropy ==
In March 2025, Go contributed ₩50 million to the Hope Bridge Korea Disaster Relief Association (Note: The Hope Bridge Korea Disaster Relief Association is a non-profit organization established in 1961. It was founded by newspaper companies, broadcasting companies, and social organizations to assist individuals affected by unforeseen disasters. Originally known as the "Korea Flood Damage Response Committee," it initially focused on providing financial aid for the victims of Typhoon Sarah in 1959. In 1964, the organization was renamed the "Korea Disaster Response Association" to expand its relief efforts and promote a culture of donation within society. In 2001, with the amendment of the Disaster Relief Act, The Hope Bridge Korea Korea Disaster Relief Association became the only relief organization in the country authorized by the government to raise and distribute donations for domestic natural disasters.) to aid recovery efforts following wildfires in the Ulsan and Gyeongsang regions. As a member of the Hope Bridge Honors Club, which consists of significant individual donors, she has been actively promoting positive initiatives since her previous donation related to the Gangwon wildfires in 2019. On May 18, Go donated ₩100 million to support children and aging out youth (Note: Aging-out youth (aged-out orphan) is an orphan who reach the age of 18 years old and must leave the orphanage or foster care system to live independently.) through the NGO Ji Foundation. Of this, ₩50 million was allocated specifically for programs assisting aging out youth. The Ji Foundation intends to utilize the funds for providing meals, livelihood support, education costs, and cultural experiences for children in foster care, as well as to offer assistance in various necessary areas. Additionally, support for aging out youth will include funds for living expenses, food, education, and housing, aimed at helping them establish a foundation for independent living.

== Filmography ==
=== Film ===
Year	Title	Role	Notes	Ref.
2016	Parallel Novel	Woman	Also director	
2018	Cheese in the Trap	Female junior	Bit part	
2018	The Witch: Part 1. The Subversion	Do Myung-hee		
2019	The Battle: Roar to Victory	Hwa-ja	Bit part	
2020	Set Play	Yoo-sun	Independent film	
2022	Decision to Leave	Shaman	Bit part	
2023	Smugglers	Go Ok-bun		
2025	The World of Love	Han Mi-do		

=== Television series ===
Year	Title	Role	Notes	Ref.
2017	My Sassy Girl	Seon-kyeong		
2017	Hello, My Twenties! 2	Oh Ha-na		
2017	Meloholic	Joo Yeo-jin		
2018	Welcome to Waikiki	Lee Min-ah	Cameo (Ep. 3)	
2018	Live	Oh Song-i		
2018	Forgotten Season	Choi Ji-yeong	Drama special	
2018	The Smile Has Left Your Eyes	Im Yoo-ri		
2019–2021	Love Alarm	Park Gul-mi	Season 1–2	
2019	Secret Boutique	Lee Hyeon-ji		
2020	The Reason Why I Can't Tell You	Seo Yoon-chan	Drama special	
2020–2024	Sweet Home	Lee Eun-yoo	Season 1–3	
2021	Youth of May	Kim Myung-hee		
2021	Jirisan	Lee Da-won		
2024	The Frog	Yoo Seong-ah		
2025	Tastefully Yours	Mo Yeon-joo		
2026	Dead-End Job	Yeon-joo		

=== Web series ===
Year	Title	Role	Notes	Ref.
2016	72 Seconds 3	Remember	Cameo (Ep. 2)	
2017	Absolutely Perfect Man	Hannah	Cameo (Ep. 3–5, 7, 14)	

=== Television shows ===
Year	Title	Role	Notes	Ref.
2022	Find Me	Narrator	Gwangju Uprising Documentary	
2024	Jinny's Kitchen	Cast member and intern	Prime Video exclusive series; season 2; credited as Ko Min-si	

=== Music video appearances ===
Year	Song title	Artist(s)	Ref.
2016	"Sign"	Thunder (feat. Goo Hara)	
2021	"Make Love"	Gray (feat. Zion.T)	

== Accolades ==
=== Awards and nominations ===
Name of the award ceremony, year presented, category, nominee of the award, and the result of the nomination
Award ceremony	Year	Category	Nominee / Work	Result	Ref.
Asian Academy Creative Awards	2021	Best Actress in Supporting Role (National Winners – Korea)	Sweet Home	Won	
Asia Contents Awards	2021	Newcomer Actress	Sweet Home	Won	
Baeksang Arts Awards	2024	Best New Actress – Film	Smugglers	Nominated	
Baeksang Arts Awards	2025	Best Actress – Television	The Frog	Nominated	
Blue Dragon Film Awards	2023	Best New Actress	Smugglers	Won	
Buil Film Awards	2023	Best Supporting Actress	Smugglers	Won	
Buil Film Awards	2023	Best New Actress	Smugglers	Nominated	
Busan Film Critics Awards	2023	Best Actress	Smugglers	Won	
Busan International Film Festival with Marie Claire Asia Star Awards	2023	Face of Asia Award	Smugglers	Won	
Chunsa Film Art Awards	2023	Best New Actress	Smugglers	Won	
Grand Bell Awards	2018	Best Supporting Actress	The Witch: Part 1. The Subversion	Nominated	
Grand Bell Awards	2023	Best Supporting Actress	Smugglers	Nominated	
KBS Drama Awards	2020	Best Actress in a One-Act/Special/Short Drama	Drama Special – The Reason Why I Can't Tell You	Nominated	
KBS Drama Awards	2021	Top Excellence Award, Actress	Youth of May	Nominated	
KBS Drama Awards	2021	Excellence Award, Actress in a Miniseries	Youth of May	Won	
KBS Drama Awards	2021	Best Couple Award	Go Min-si with Lee Do-hyun; Youth of May	Won	
Kino Lights Awards	2021	Actress of the Year (Domestic)	Love Alarm 2, Youth of May and Jirisan	5th place	
Korea Best Star Awards	2018	Popular Star Award	The Witch: Part 1. The Subversion	Won	
Korean Film Producers Association Awards	2023	Best Supporting Actress	Smugglers	Won	
SBS Drama Awards	2019	Best New Actress	Secret Boutique	Won	
Three Minutes Film Festival	2016	Grand Prize	Parallel Novel	Won	

=== State honors ===
Name of the organization, year presented, and the award given
Country	Ceremony	Year	Award	Ref.
South Korea	Korean Popular Culture and Arts Awards (Note: Honors are given at the Korean Popular Culture and Arts Awards, arranged by the Korea Creative Content Agency and hosted by the Ministry of Culture, Sports and Tourism. They are awarded to those who have contributed to the arts and South Korea's pop culture.)	2024	Minister of Culture, Sports and Tourism Commendation	
South Korea	Newsis K-Expo Cultural Awards (Note: Established in 2019 and co-sponsored by Korea's Ministry of Culture, Sports and Tourism, Ministry of Foreign Affairs, Korea Creative Content Agency, Seoul Metropolitan Council and the Seoul Tourism Organization, it awards cultural icons, businesses, and individuals who have contributed greatly to Hallyu, the Korean wave.)	2024	Seoul Mayor's Award	

=== Listicles ===
Name of publisher, year listed, name of listicle, and placement
Publisher	Year	Listicle	Placement	Ref.
Cine21	2020	New Actress to watch out for in 2021	5th (Note: Tied with Kim Da-mi, Kim Se-jeong, Park Gyu-young, Park Hye-su, and Jeong Su-jeong)	
Cine21	2021	New Actress to watch out for in 2022	6th (Note: Tied with Park Eun-bin, Moon Ga-young, Keum Sae-rok, Joo Hyun-young, Park Gyu-young, Lee Soo-kyung, Roh Yoon-seo, Gong Seung-yeon, Lee Se-young, IU, Shin Hyun-been, Park Ji-hu, Han So-hee, Jung Ji-so, Bang Min-ah, Jeon Jong-seo, Roh Jeong-eui)	
Cine21	2023	Actress to watch out for in 2024	3rd (Note: Tied with Han So-hee and Kim Tae-ri)	
Cine21	2024	"Korean Film NEXT 50" – Actors	Placed	
Forbes	2025	Korea Power Celebrity	25th	
Joy News 24	2023	Rising Star Film Actor of the Year	1st	
Vogue Korea	2021	Notable Actress of 2021	Top 4	
