= Cho Jin-woong =

South Korean actor (born 1976)

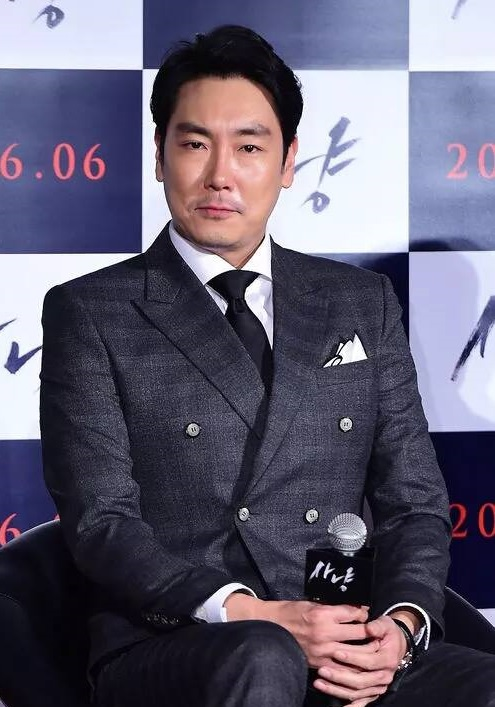
- Cho in 2016
- Born: Jo Won-jun; March 3, 1976 (age 50); Munhyeon-dong, Nam-gu, Busan, South Korea
- Other name: Jo Jin-woong
- Education: Kyungsung University
- Occupation: Actor
- Years active: 2004–2025
- Agent: Saram Entertainment
- Spouse: Kim Min-a (m. 2013)

Korean name
- Hangul: 조원준
- RR: Jo Wonjun
- MR: Cho Wŏnjun

Stage name
- Hangul: 조진웅
- RR: Jo Jinung
- MR: Cho Chinung

Cho Jin-woong (Korean: 조진웅; born March 3, 1976), born Cho Won-jun (조원준), is a retired South Korean actor. He gained early recognition for his supporting roles in the films Nameless Gangster: Rules of the Time (2012), The Admiral: Roaring Currents (2014), and Assassination (2015).

Cho is known for starring in the high-profile films The Handmaiden (2016), The Sheriff in Town (2017), The Spy Gone North (2018), Believer (2018), Intimate Strangers (2018), and Black Money (2019), as well as the television series Deep Rooted Tree (2011) and Signal (2016). For his role as a mysterious villain in A Hard Day (2014), Cho won Best Actor at the 51st Baeksang Arts Awards.

== Early life and education ==
Cho was born Jo Won-jun on April 2, 1976 in Busan. His father's name is Cho Jin-woong. He graduated from the Department of Theater and Film at Kyungsung University.

== Career ==
=== Beginning in theater ===
Cho began his acting career on stage, spending nine years with the Dongnyeok theater troupe. During this time, he appeared in several notable plays, including Baridegi (2001), The Parrot's Song (2002), Macbeth (2003), and Veronica Decides to Die (2003).

=== Screen debut and career as character actor ===
Cho made his screen debut in 2004 with the film Once Upon a Time in High School, an opportunity he came across by chance. While strolling in Samseong-dong, he met a military senior who worked at a film company and invited him to audition. he soon found himself in the company's office meeting teen star Kwon Sang-woo, which led him to believe the opportunity was legitimate. Despite being 29 or 30 years old at the time, he was cast as a high school student. Before the film's release, he asked his father for permission to adopt his name as his stage name, a choice he said was a pledge "not to bring shame to my father's name." His father's name, Jin-woong, written in hanja as "thunder" (震) and "male" (雄).

Early in his career, Cho gained a reputation as a scene-stealer in supporting roles in films such as Hwang Dong-hyuk's film Our Brother (2004), Jung Ji-woo's film Running Wild (2006), Yu Ha's film A Dirty Carnival (2006), and Kwak Kyung-taek's film Gangster High (2006). He expanded his presence on television with key roles in dramas like My Too Perfect Sons (KBS2, 2009), The Slave Hunters (KBS2, 2010), A Man Called God (MBC, 2010), and Deep Rooted Tree (SBS, 2011).

Cho's career took a significant turn with a series of acclaimed film roles, including Jang Hoon's film The Front Line(2011), Park Hee-gon's film Perfect Game (2011), and Yoon Jong-bin's film Nameless Gangster: Rules of the Time (2012). His filmography continued to grow with notable performances in Jang Joon-hwan's film Hwayi: A Monster Boy (2013), Kim Seong-hun's film A Hard Day (2014), and Yoon Jong-bin's film Kundo: Age of the Rampant (2014). He was part of two films that each attracted over 10 million viewers, Kim Han-min's film The Admiral: Roaring Currents (2014) and Choi Dong-hoon's film Assassination (2015).

=== Transitioning to leading role ===
Working in both television and film, Cho starred in the tvN drama Signal in January 2015. His portrayal of Detective Lee Jae-han solidified his status as a leading man, opening the door to a new phase of his career.

Following Signal, he returned to film, attending the Cannes Film Festival with Park Chan-wook's film The Handmaiden. He then starred in Lee Woo-cheol's film The Hunt, where he took on his first-ever dual role. Although The Hunt was not a box office hit, his performance received critical acclaim. With his charm and box office power now proven, Cho then starred in Kim Hyung-joo's film The Sheriff in Town and appeared in the tvN drama Entourage in the second half of 2016. His next film was Lee Soo-yeon's film Bluebeard.

Cho's film Believer, a crime thriller inspired by the Hong Kong film Drug War, was released on May 22. In the film, he plays Detective Won-ho, who has been tracking a drug cartel for years. After a mysterious explosion, Won-ho pursues the hidden boss, "Mr. Lee," with the help of Oh Yeon-ok (Kim Sung-ryung), a member of the organization, and an abandoned member, Rock (Ryu Jun-yeol).

=== Retirement ===
In late 2025, he abruptly announced his retirement after his criminal record from his teenage years came to light.

== Personal life ==
In 2013, he married his wife, Kim Min-a, after they had been dating for seven years.

=== Tax audit ===
Tax authorities assessed Cho about ₩1.1 billion after a regular audit, Saram Entertainment said in March 2025. He paid the amount in full. The agency said he had reported corporate tax on income of a company he established, and that officials treated the same income as personally taxable. It described the extra levy as a difference in how tax law was interpreted and applied, not intentional evasion, and said Cho had asked the Tax Tribunal to review the decision.

== Filmography ==
=== Film ===
Year	Title	Role	Notes	Ref.
2004	Once Upon a Time in High School	Yasaengma gang member	Bit part	
2004	My Brother	Doo-shik	Bit part	
2006	Hello Stranger	Yong-gil	Short film	
2006	Running Wild	Guryongpa gang member	Bit part	
2006	A Dirty Carnival	Young-pil	Bit part	
2006	Les Formidables	Detective Shin		
2006	Gangster High	Jo Hong-kyu		
2008	His Last Gift	Baek In-chul	Bit part	
2008	My New Partner	Jung Young-chul		
2008	The Guard Post	Cook		
2008	Spare	Smuggler's	Voice cameo	
2008	Sweet Lie	Jung Han-sang		
2008	A Frozen Flower	Tae Ahn-gong	Cameo	
2009	Take Off	Commentator	Cameo	
2009	Fly, Penguin	Han Chang-soo		
2009	City of Fathers	Han Sang-goo		
2010	Killing of Game	Viper	Unreleased	
2010	Bestseller	Chan-sik		
2010	A Barefoot Dream	James	Cameo	
2011	Glove	Charles		
2011	The Front Line	Yoo Jae-ho		
2011	Perfect Game	Kim Yong-chul		
2012	Nameless Gangster: Rules of the Time	Kim Pan-ho		
2012	A Millionaire on the Run	Kim Seung-dae	Cameo	
2012	Perfect Number	Jo Min-beom		
2013	Man on the Edge	Hwang Man-sam	Cameo	
2013	An Ethics Lesson	Myung-rok		
2013	My Paparotti	Chang-soo		
2013	Hwayi: A Monster Boy	Ki-tae		
2014	A Hard Day	Park Chang-min		
2014	Kundo: Age of the Rampant	Lee Tae-ki		
2014	The Admiral: Roaring Currents	Wakisaka Yasuharu		
2014	We Are Brothers	Park Sang-yeon		
2015	Chronicle of a Blood Merchant	Mr. Ahn		
2015	Foulball	Narrator	Documentary	
2015	Salut d'Amour	Jang-soo		
2015	Assassination	Chu Sang-ok		
2016	The Handmaiden	Kouzuki		
2016	The Hunt	Park Dong-geun / Park Myeong-geun		
2017	Bluebeard	Seung-hoon		
2017	The Sheriff in Town	Jong-jin		
2017	Blue Busking	Reporter Seo	Cameo	
2017	The Outlaws	Regional investigation unit leader	Cameo	
2017	Man of Will	Kim Chang-soo		
2018	The Spy Gone North	Choi Hak-sung		
2018	Believer	Won-ho		
2018	Intimate Strangers	Seok-ho		
2019	Jesters: The Game Changers	Deok-Ho		
2019	Man of Men	Young-gi		
2019	Black Money	Yang Min-Hyuk		
2020	Me and Me	Park Hyung-goo		
2021	History: Trailer	—N/a	Short film; also director	
2021	1984 Choi Dong-won	Narrator	Documentary	
2022	The Policeman's Lineage	Park Kang-yoon		
2023	The Devil's Deal	Jeon Hae-woong		
2023	The Boys	Oh Jae-hyung	Cameo	
2023	Believer 2	Won-ho		
2024	Dead Man	Lee Man-jae		
2025	La Resistance	Narrator	Documentary	

=== Television series ===
Year	Title	Role	Notes	Ref.
2007	Romance Hunter	Park Cheol-gi		
2008	Don't Ask Me About the Past	Bae Yoon-goo		
2008	Lottery Trio	President Park		
2009	My Too Perfect Sons	Brutus Lee		
2009	Hot Blood	Lee Soon-gil		
2010	The Slave Hunters	Kwak Han-seom		
2010	A Man Called God	Jang-ho		
2010	Flames of Desire	Kang Joon-goo		
2011	Believe in Love	Kim Chul-soo		
2011	Deep Rooted Tree	Moo-hyul		
2014	Beyond the Clouds	Park Kang-jae		
2016	Signal	Lee Jae-han		
2016	Entourage	Kim Eun-gap		
2023	The Good Bad Mother	Choi Hae-sik	Cameo	
2024	No Way Out: The Roulette	Bae Joong-sik		
2025	Karma	Loan shark	Cameo	

=== Television shows ===
Year	Title	Role	Notes	Ref.
2021	Off The Grid	Main Cast		
2023	Europe Outside the Tent	Cast Member	Season 2	

=== Web shows ===
Year	Title	Role	Notes	Ref.
2021	Saturday Night Live Korea	Host	Episode 10	

== Musical theater ==
Year	Title	Role
2001	Baridaegi	Mu Jang-seng
2002	앵무가	Tiger
2003	Macbeth	Macbeth
2003	Veronika Decides to Die	Dr. Lee
2004	The Balba Balba	

== Accolades ==
=== Awards and nominations ===
Year	Award	Category	Nominated work	Result
2009	KBS Drama Awards	Best Supporting Actor	My Too Perfect Sons, Hot Blood	Nominated
2010	18th Chunsa Film Art Awards	Best New Actor	Bestseller	Won
2011	47th Baeksang Arts Awards	Best New Actor (Film)	GLove	Nominated
2011	SBS Drama Awards	Special Award, Actor in a Drama Special	Deep Rooted Tree	Nominated
2012	21st Buil Film Awards	Best Supporting Actor	Nameless Gangster: Rules of the Time	Won
2013	49th Baeksang Arts Awards	Best Supporting Actor (Film)	Perfect Number	Nominated
2013	34th Blue Dragon Film Awards	Best Supporting Actor	Hwayi: A Monster Boy	Nominated
2014	18th Puchon International Fantastic Film Festival	It Award	A Hard Day	Won
2014	23rd Buil Film Awards	Best Supporting Actor	A Hard Day	Nominated
2014	51st Grand Bell Awards	Best Supporting Actor	A Hard Day	Nominated
2014	35th Blue Dragon Film Awards	Best Supporting Actor	A Hard Day	Won
2014	4th Korea Film Actors Association Awards	Korea's Top Supporting Actor	A Hard Day	Won
2014	KBS Drama Awards	Best Supporting Actor	The Full Sun	Nominated
2015	10th Max Movie Awards	Best Supporting Actor	A Hard Day	Won
2015	9th Asian Film Awards	Best Supporting Actor	A Hard Day	Nominated
2015	51st Baeksang Arts Awards	Best Actor (Film)	A Hard Day	Won
2015	24th Buil Film Awards	Best Supporting Actor	Assassination	Nominated
2015	36th Blue Dragon Film Awards	Best Supporting Actor	Assassination	Nominated
2016	21st Chunsa Film Art Awards	Best Supporting Actor	Assassination	Won
2016	52nd Baeksang Arts Awards	Best Supporting Actor (Film)	Assassination	Nominated
2016	52nd Baeksang Arts Awards	Best Actor (TV)	Signal	Nominated
2016	5th APAN Star Awards	Top Excellence Award, Actor in a Miniseries	Signal	Won
2016	tvN10 Awards	Grand Prize (Daesang) - Actor	Signal	Won
2016	tvN10 Awards	Best Actor	Signal	Nominated
2016	1st Asia Artist Awards	Grand Prize (Daesang)	Signal	Won
2016	5th Korea Film Actors Association Awards	Korea's Top Star	—N/a	Won
2016	7th Korean Popular Culture & Arts Awards	Prime Minister Award	—N/a	Won
2017	53rd Baeksang Arts Awards	Best Supporting Actor (Film)	The Handmaiden	Nominated
2017	26th Buil Film Awards	Best Actor	Bluebeard	Nominated
2018	55th Grand Bell Awards	Best Actor	Believer	Nominated
2018	3rd DongA's PICK	Golden Hand Award	—N/a	Won
2020	24th Fantasia International Film Festival	Jury Special Mention in the Cheval Noir Competition	Me and Me	Won
2020	21st Busan Film Critics Awards	Best Actor	Me and Me	Won
2020	7th Korean Film Producers Association	Best Actor	Black Money	Won
2021	40th Golden Cinema Film Festival	Best Actor	Black Money	Won
2021	57th Baeksang Arts Awards	Best Actor (Film)	Me and Me	Nominated
2021	8th Wildflower Film Awards	Best Actor	Me and Me	Nominated
2021	26th Chunsa Film Art Awards	Best Actor	Me and Me	Nominated
2022	31st Buil Film Awards	Best Actor	The Policeman's Lineage	Nominated
2023	Broadcast Advertising Festival	CF Star Grand Prize	—N/a	Won
2023	18th Asia Model Festival	Asia Star Award in Actor	—N/a	Won
2024	Asia Contents Awards & Global OTT Awards	Best Lead Actor	No Way Out: The Roulette	Nominated

=== Listicles ===
Name of publisher, year listed, name of listicle, and placement
Publisher	Year	Listicle	Placement	Ref.
The Screen	2019	2009–2019 Top Box Office Powerhouse Actors in Korean Movies	15th	

=== Other accolades ===
In 2021, he was selected as Jury member for Actor and Actress of the Year Award in 26th Busan International Film Festival held in October.
