= Choi Woo-shik =

Canadian actor (born 1990)

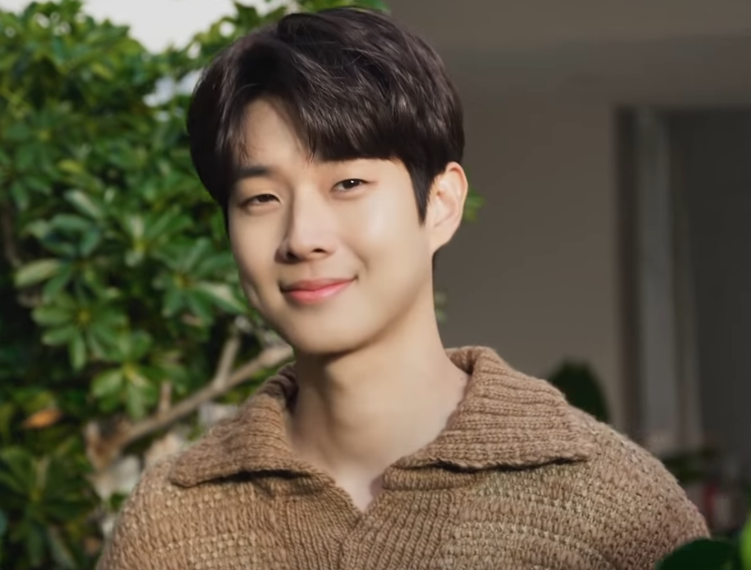
- Choi in December 2021
- Born: Choi Woo-shik; March 26, 1990 (age 36); Seoul, South Korea
- Other name: Edward Choi
- Citizenship: Canada
- Education: Chung-Ang University (B.A. in Cultural Studies)
- Occupation: Actor
- Years active: 2011–present
- Agent: Fable Company

Korean name
- Hangul: 최우식
- RR: Choe Usik
- MR: Ch'oe Usik

Signature
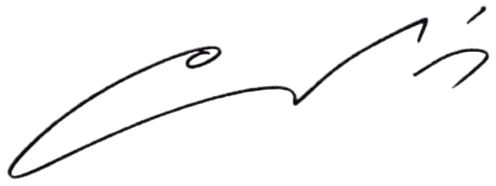

Choi Woo-shik (Korean: 최우식; pronounced [tɕʰø.u.ɕik̚]; born March 26, 1990) is a Canadian actor based in South Korea. He first gained recognition for starring in the film Set Me Free (2014) and the television series Hogu's Love (2015) before coming to international prominence for his roles in the films Train to Busan (2016) and Parasite (2019) both of which were critical and commercial successes with the latter winning the Palme d'Or at Cannes and the Academy Award for Best Picture. He has since starred in the television series Our Beloved Summer (2021–2022) and A Killer Paradox (2024), as well as the films The Policeman's Lineage (2022) and Wonderland (2024).

== Early life and education ==
Choi was born in Seoul, South Korea, the younger of two sons. He migrated to Vancouver, Canada with his family when he was ten years old where he spent the next ten years of his life. He attended high school at Pinetree Secondary School. His English name is Edward Choi and he goes by the nickname Eddie. He is fluent in English and Korean.

In 2010, while attending Simon Fraser University, then-20-year-old Choi was given permission by his parents to attend an acting audition in South Korea, subsequently leading to him making his acting debut. Whilst in Korea, Choi enrolled at Chung-Ang University, where he majored in cultural studies, aiming to learn more about Korean culture as he felt he had become somewhat estranged from his heritage having grown up in Canada.

== Career ==
=== 2011–2015: Beginnings ===
Choi made his acting debut in the period drama The Duo in 2011. Supporting roles followed, and Choi was cast in crime drama Special Affairs Team TEN as detective Park Min-ho. Choi reprised his role when the series was renewed for a second season in 2013. He made his big screen debut that same year, starring as a supporting character in the film Flu and Secretly, Greatly. In the interim, Choi played several characters on television series such as Rooftop Prince, You Are My Destiny and Pride and Prejudice.

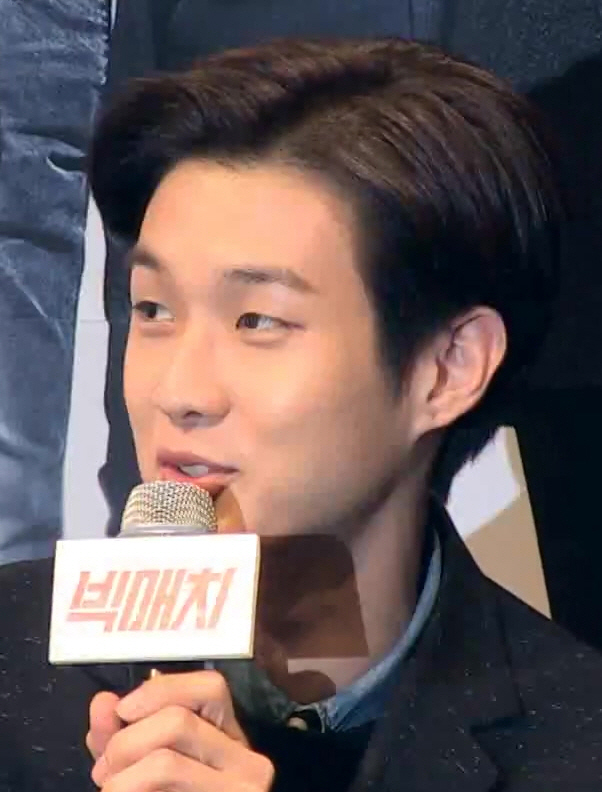
Choi in November 2014

In 2014, Choi took on his first leading role in the coming-of-age independent film Set Me Free. He played the role of Young-jae, a sixteen-year-old student living in a group home, who pretends that he wants to become a priest in order to prolong his stay at the home. The film was well received by critics, and Choi was praised for his portrayal of the protagonist's inner conflict. He won several awards for his acting, including Actor of the Year at the Busan International Film Festival. Later that year, Choi also starred in the action comedy film Big Match, playing the role of genius hacker Guru.

Choi starred as the titular character in the romantic comedy cable series Hogu's Love. The series began airing on February 9, 2015. Choi also took part in the R-rated Hong Kong-Singaporean film In the Room later that year. The film featured an anthology of characters, set in a single-room brothel at a hotel in Singapore.

=== 2016–2020: Rising fame and international breakthrough ===
Choi first gained international recognition with the blockbuster zombie thriller film Train to Busan, where he played the role of high school baseball player, Yong-guk. Premiering at the 2016 Cannes Film Festival on May 13, the film was a critical and commercial success, going on to gross over $93.1 million worldwide. He followed this up with a short, but memorable role as a truck driver in action-adventure film Okja. This marked his first collaboration with director Bong Joon-ho and featured an international cast, including Tilda Swinton and Paul Dano. Okja was screened in several independent theatres domestically, and released on streaming platform Netflix worldwide.

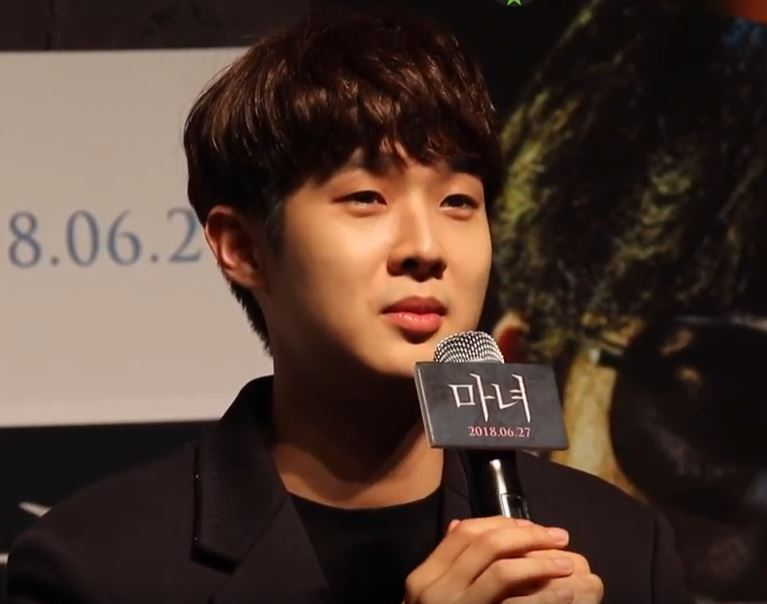
Choi in June 2018

Choi continued starring in several other films after this, including The Princess and the Matchmaker and Monstrum. In 2018, Choi was cast as a mysterious assassin called the "Nobleman" in the action film The Witch: Part 1. The Subversion. The dark persona of the Nobleman was a shift from the characters Choi usually played. In a press interview, co-star Park Hee-soon remarked that Nobleman could be Choi's once-in-a-lifetime character.

In 2019, Choi reunited with director Bong Joon-ho for the black comedy thriller film Parasite. Choi played the main character Ki-woo, the son of a poor family, who schemes to become employed by a wealthy family by infiltrating their household and posing as unrelated, highly qualified individuals. Choi was first approached by Bong after their first collaboration with Okja in 2016, who told the actor to "stay skinny" to play the character. Parasite premiered at the 2019 Cannes Film Festival on May 21, 2019, where it became the first South Korean film to win the Palme d'Or, and was the first film to win with a unanimous vote since Blue Is the Warmest Colour at the 2013 Festival. Among other numerous accolades, Parasite won a leading four awards at the 92nd Academy Awards. It became the first South Korean film to receive Academy Award recognition, as well as the first film in a language other than English to win Best Picture. The cast also won the award for Outstanding Performance by a Cast in a Motion Picture at the 26th Screen Actors Guild Awards. In addition to his role as Ki-woo in Parasite, Choi performed the end credits song "Soju One Glass," which made the shortlist for the Academy Award for Best Original Song.

=== 2021–present: Leading roles ===
In December 2021, Choi starred in the SBS drama Our Beloved Summer which was also released on Netflix. It marked his return to the small screen after four years. In 2022, Choi returned to the big screen with the film The Policeman's Lineage which premiered on January 12, 2022.

In April 2023, it was announced that Choi's contract with Management SOOP has expired and signed with Fable Company. He starred in Netflix's crime thriller series A Killer Paradox in 2024 which was based on the popular webtoon of the same name. He then starred in the Netflix series Melo Movie in 2025.

== Filmography ==
=== Film ===
Year	Title	Role	Notes	Ref.
2011	Etude, Solo	Hwang Kyeong-min	Short film	
2012	Circle of Crime			
2013	Secretly, Greatly	Yoon Yoo-joon		
2013	Flu	Jeong-Jin	Cameo	
2014	Set Me Free	Young-jae		
2014	Big Match	Guru		
2015	In the Room	Min-jun	Singaporean film	
2016	Train to Busan	Yong-guk		
2017	Okja	Kim Woo-shik		
2018	Golden Slumber	Joo-ho	Cameo	
2018	The Princess and the Matchmaker	Nam Chi-Ho		
2018	The Witch: Part 1. The Subversion	Gwi Gong-Ja (Nobleman)		
2018	Monstrum	Officer Hur		
2019	Rosebud	young Soon-cheol		
2019	Parasite	Kim Ki-woo / Kevin (alias)		
2019	The Divine Fury	Father Choi	Cameo	
2020	Time to Hunt	Ki-hoon		
2022	The Policeman's Lineage	Choi Min-jae		
2024	Wonderland	Hyun-soo		
2026	Number One	Ha-min		

=== Television series ===
Year	Title	Role	Notes	Ref.
2011	The Duo	Young Gwi-dong		
2011	Living in Style	Na Joo-ra		
2011	Deep Rooted Tree	Young Jung Gi-joon / Ga Ri-on		
2011–2013	Special Affairs Team TEN	Park Min-ho	Season 1–2	
2012	Rooftop Prince	Do Chi-san		
2012	Family	Yeol Woo-bong		
2012	Culprit Among Friends	Young Do-hyun	Drama special	
2013	Who Are You?	Hee-koo	Cameo (episode 10, 12–13)	
2013	Principal Investigator: Save Wang Jo-hyun!	Boo Joong-shik	Drama special	
2014	You're All Surrounded	Choi Woo-shik	Cameo (episode 4)	
2014	You Are My Destiny	Lee Yong		
2014	Pride and Prejudice	Lee Jang-won		
2015	Hogu's Love	Kang Ho-gu		
2015	My Fantastic Funeral	Park Dong-soo	Two-part special	
2017	Fight for My Way	Park Moo-bin	Cameo (episode 1–7)	
2017	The Package	Kim Gyung-jae		
2021–2022	Our Beloved Summer	Choi Woong / Go-oh		
2024	A Killer Paradox	Lee Tang		
2025	Melo Movie	Ko Gyeom		
2025	Would You Marry Me?	Kim Woo-joo		
2027	Whale Star: The Gyeongseong Mermaid	Kang Ui-hyeon		

=== Web series ===
Year	Title	Role	Notes	Ref.
2013	Someday	Chae Man-sik		
2015	Dream Knight	Past student	Cameo	
2017	The Boy Next Door	Park Gyu-tae		

=== Television shows ===
Year	Title	Role	Ref.
2012	I'm Real	Cast member	
2013–2014	Beating Hearts	Cast member	
2015	Law of the Jungle in Nicaragua	Cast member	
2020	Summer Vacation	Cast member	
2021	Youn's Stay	Cast member	
2022	In the Soop: Friendcation	Cast member	
2023	Jinny's Kitchen	Cast member	
2023	Jinny's Kitchen Team Building	Cast member	
2024	Jinny's Kitchen Season 2	Cast member	

=== Music video appearances ===
Year	Song title	Artist	Ref.
2014	"My Old Story"	IU	
2015	"Congratulations"	Day6	
2017	"That Moment"	Lim Seul-ong	
2017	"You Were Beautiful"	Day6	

== Discography ==
Title	Year	Album
"Some Guys" (with Jang Ki-yong)	2017	The Boy Next Door OST
"Soju One Glass"	2019	Parasite OST
"Poom" (with Peakboy)	2021	Non-album single
"Polaroid" (With Wooga Squad : Park Seo-joon, Park Hyung-sik, Kim Taehyung, Peakboy)	2022	In the Soop: Friendcation OST

== Accolades ==
=== Awards and nominations ===
Name of the award ceremony, year presented, category, nominee of the award, and the result of the nomination
Award ceremony	Year	Category	Nominee / Work	Result	Ref.
APAN Star Awards	2022	Excellence Award, Actor in a Miniseries	Our Beloved Summer	Nominated	
APAN Star Awards	2022	Best Couple	Choi Woo-shik with Kim Da-mi; Our Beloved Summer	Nominated	
Asia Artist Awards	2020	Popularity Award (Actor)	Choi Woo-shik	Nominated	
Asia Artist Awards	2021	Popularity Award (Actor)	Choi Woo-shik	Nominated	
Asia Contents Awards & Global OTT Awards	2024	Best Lead Actor	Choi Woo-shik	Nominated	
Asian Film Awards	2020	Best Supporting Actor	Parasite	Nominated	
Blue Dragon Film Awards	2014	Best New Actor	Set Me Free	Won	
Blue Dragon Series Awards	2024	Best Actor	A Killer Paradox	Nominated	
Blue Dragon Series Awards	2024	TIRTIR Popular Star Award	Choi Woo-sik	Won	
Buil Film Awards	2015	Best New Actor	Set Me Free	Nominated	
Buil Film Awards	2019	Best Actor	Parasite	Nominated	
Brand Customer Loyalty Awards	2022	Best Male Actor	Our Beloved Summer	Nominated	
Busan Film Critics Awards	2015	Best New Actor	Set Me Free	Won	
Busan International Film Festival	2014	Actor of the Year	Set Me Free	Won	
Chunsa Film Art Awards	2017	Special Popularity Award	Choi Woo-shik	Won	
Chunsa Film Art Awards	2019	Best Actor	Parasite	Nominated	
Critics' Choice Awards	2020	Best Acting Ensemble	Parasite	Nominated	
Director's Cut Awards	2019	Best Actor	Parasite	Nominated	
Korean Association of Film Critics Awards	2015	Best New Actor	Set Me Free	Won	
Korea First Brand Awards	2019	Best Actor (Film)	Choi Woo-shik	Won	
Max Movie Awards	2015	Best New Actor	Set Me Free	Nominated	
Max Movie Awards	2016	Rising Star Award	Choi Woo-shik	Won	
SBS Drama Awards	2021	Director's Award	Our Beloved Summer	Won	
SBS Drama Awards	2021	Top Excellence Award for an Actor in a Mini-Series (Romance/Comedy)	Our Beloved Summer	Nominated	
SBS Drama Awards	2021	Best Couple Award	Choi Woo-shik with Kim Da-mi; Our Beloved Summer	Nominated	
SBS Drama Awards	2025	Top Excellence Award, Actor in a Romance/Comedy Drama	Would You Marry Me?	Won	
Screen Actors Guild Awards	2020	Outstanding Performance by a Cast in a Motion Picture	Parasite	Won	
Korean Film Actors Association Star Award	2015	Popular Actor Award	Choi Woo-shik	Won	
Wildflower Film Awards	2015	Best New Actor	Set Me Free	Won	

=== Listicles ===
Name of publisher, year listed, name of listicle, and placement
Publisher	Year	Listicle	Placement	Ref.
Cine21	2021	Actors that will lead Korean Video Content Industry in 2022	6th (Note: mentioned together with Wi Ha-joon, Kim Soo-hyun, Jo Jung-suk, Park Jeong-min, Kim Seon-ho, Ma Dong-seok, Ahn Bo-hyun, Ryu Jun-yeol, Song Kang-ho)	
The Screen	2019	2009–2019 Top Box Office Powerhouse Actors in Korean Movies	42nd	
