= The Spy Gone North =

2018 film by Yoon Jong-bin

- Theatrical poster
- Hangul: 공작
- Hanja: 工作
- RR: Gongjak
- MR: Kongjak
- Directed by: Yoon Jong-bin
- Written by: Kwon Sung-hwi; Yoon Jong-bin
- Produced by: Kuk Su-ran; Han Jae-duk; Son Sang-bum
- Starring: Hwang Jung-min; Lee Sung-min; Cho Jin-woong; Ju Ji-hoon
- Cinematography: Choi Chan-min
- Edited by: Kim Sang-bum; Kim Jae-bum
- Music by: Jo Yeong-wook
- Production companies: Sanai Pictures; Moonlight Film
- Distributed by: CJ E&M
- Release dates: May 11, 2018 (Cannes); August 8, 2018 (South Korea)
- Running time: 137 minutes
- Country: South Korea
- Languages: Korean; Mandarin; Japanese
- Budget: US$14 million
- Box office: US$38.5 million

The Spy Gone North (Korean: 공작; RR: Gongjak) is a 2018 South Korean spy drama film directed by Yoon Jong-bin. It stars Hwang Jung-min, Lee Sung-min, Cho Jin-woong and Ju Ji-hoon. The film is loosely based on the true story of Park Chae-seo, a former South Korean agent who infiltrated North Korea's nuclear facilities. It was released in theaters on August 8, 2018.

== Plot ==
In January 1992, Major Park Seok-young is recruited by the Agency for National Security Planning (ANSP) to uncover North Korea's nuclear programme, the true extent of which was only known to the elites and its leader Kim Jong Il. Under Director Choi's instructions, he assumes the identity of an alcoholic businessman who left the army after falling into debt. Choi assigns Park to get close to Ri Myung-woon, the director of the North Korean External Economic Committee.

Based in Beijing, Park establishes himself as a businessman seeking to trade in North Korean products, and his activities draw the attention of Ri and other North Koreans officials. The ANSP orchestrates a crackdown on counterfeit North Korean products made in China, which leads to Chinese officials arresting Jang Sung-hoon, nephew of Jang Sung-taek. This forces Ri to seek Park to raise the money for Jang's release. However, Ri remains wary of Park and demands South Korean intelligence in exchange for trust.

Choi arranges for Park to deliver cash along with minor classified information. Additionally, he provides imitation Rolex watches as gifts for the North Koreans. In a subsequent meeting, Jung Moo-taek from the State Security Department offers that Park directly sell military secrets to him instead of continuing as a businessman. Park, feigning indignation, rejects the offer. During a later dinner, Jung becomes suspicious and tries to search Park, leading to a scuffle that exposes the Rolex watches. Ri, displeased with Jung's actions, ultimately decides to trust Park.

Park proposes an advertising venture with Han Chang-joo, who wishes to shoot locations in the North. However, as this venture involves South Korean conglomerates, it requires approval from Kim Jong Il. In the North, Park and Ri convinces Kim Jong Il to approve the venture, which also includes the construction of a resort on Mount Geumgang. Kim also wishes to sell his artifacts from the Goryeo and Joseon dynasties.

During the filming process, Park seizes an opportunity to visit Yongbyon under the pretext of searching for more artifacts, allowing him to get closer to the nuclear facility. While there, Ri and Kim Myung-soo, a relative of the Kim family, present him with a pin of the Kims. As Park witnesses the devastating effects of the North Korean famine, Kim confides his dissatisfaction with Kim Jong Il's regime. Kim is subsequently exiled.

As Kim Dae-jung's popularity grows, which threatens the ANSP's influence, Choi orders Park to deliver a letter to the North Koreans. Suspicious of the agency's motives, Park wiretaps a meeting where Choi proposes to Ri and Jung to attack South Korea's outlying islands and weaken Kim's support. Park confronts Choi, who dismisses him as being swayed by the communists. Instead, Park turns to Ri, who secretly harbors doubts about the regime.

They meet with Kim once again, dissuading him from going ahead with the provocation after Park exposes Jung's embezzlement of US$400,000 from Choi's payment. Kim Dae-jung is ultimately elected president, but the ANSP proceeds to expose Park as their spy. In Pyongyang, Ri forces Park to choose between defection to the North or face execution. While Park rejects to defect, Ri is unable to shoot Park. Instead, Ri helps Park leave the North by giving him a special visa. The two bid a painful farewell as Ri stays behind, confident he won't be purged. Meanwhile, Kim investigates the ANSP's attempted election interferences, leading to Choi's dismissal and the ANSP's reorganisation into the National Intelligence Service.

In 2005, Park and Ri reunite again in Shanghai at a South Korean advertising shoot featuring a North Korean actress alongside Lee Hyori.

== Cast ==
- Hwang Jung-min as Park Seok-young (codename Black Venus)
- Lee Sung-min as Ri Myung-woon
- Cho Jin-woong as Choi Hak-sung, director of the National Intelligence Service
- Ju Ji-hoon as Jung Moo-taek, an agent from the State Security Department
- Park Sung-woong as Han Chang-joo, a South Korean advertising businessman
- Joo Hae-eun as a North Korean agent
- Gi Ju-bong as Kim Jong Il
- Kim Hyun as a Real estate office owner
- Kim So-jin as Han Chang-joo's wife
- Park Min-su as Ri Myung-woon's son
- Lee Hyori as herself (cameo)

== Production ==
Filming began on January 24, 2017 and concluded on July 25, 2017. Some parts of the film that were set in Beijing and North Korea were filmed in Taiwan.

== Release ==
The film made its world premiere at the 2018 Cannes Film Festival. It released theatrically in South Korea on August 8, 2018, with age 12-rating. The film was sold to more than 100 countries, and was released theatrically in North America on August 17, 2018. The Wilson Center's Center for Korean History and Public Policy hosted the film's U.S. East Coast premiere on August 14, 2018.

The Spy Gone North was released on VOD by CJ E&M on September 13, 2018.

== Reception ==
=== Favorable response ===
On review aggregator Rotten Tomatoes, The Spy Gone North has an approval rating of 100% based on 21 reviews and an average rating of 7.1/10. On Metacritic, the film received an average score of 69 out of 100 based on 6 reviews, indicating "generally favorable reviews".

Charles Bramesco of The Guardian rated the film 3 out of 5 and wrote: "Yoon [Jong-bin] executes all the classic double-agent set pieces with finesse, and those enamoured of the genre will appreciate a change of setting."

Maggie Lee of the Variety wrote: "Instead of the usual dose of action and suspense one expects of this genre, watching this dense 140-minute political drama unfold is like fumbling through a long tunnel that's nonetheless worth it when the ray of light emerges at the end."

Deborah Young of The Hollywood Reporter described the film as "a stylish, blood-pounding thriller of the type Asian cinema is so good at making...For sheer topicality, the film is hard to beat, and to find a full-blown entertainment yarn in Cannes' midnight section that's partially set in newsworthy North Korea is rather astounding."

Gary Goldstein of The LA Times wrote: "Park and Ri's evolving friendship adds depth and humanity to this timely, ambitious tale which boldly reflects some of the region's more unsettling aspects. Eerily vivid re-creation of Jong-il's insular, lockstep-oriented world, plus a stirring score by Cho Young-Wuk, are highlights."

Yoon Min-sik of The Korea Herald wrote: "The scene of South and North Koreans sitting together and conspiring over what to do in order to retain power shows that things are not always so black and white. Heukgeumseong, taught to regard all elements of the hermit kingdom as evil, sees the human side of the North Koreans through his interaction with them, extending his perspective to beyond what is presented to him... The flick looks at the event that occurred more than two decades ago, yet the message is strangely contemporary. The search for what is right and wrong is an eternal question."

Boon Chan of The Straits Times wrote: "Things get really riveting in the last act when larger forces come into play, proving the cynics' case that politics makes for the strangest of bedfellows and the fundamental aim of those in power is to stay in power."

Tim Grierson of Screen International wrote: "In The Spy Gone North, words hit harder than bullets, all leading to an unexpectedly moving finale in which no dialogue is spoken."

=== Critical response ===
James Marsh of the South China Morning Post rated the film 3.5/5 and wrote: "Rather than strive for a James Bond-style spy caper, Yoon explores his characters' patriotic motivations, and in the process humanises many of the film's primary antagonists, while exposing endemic corruption in South Korean politics. Thankfully these moments are countered by some expertly executed sequences of high-stakes espionage, balancing the film's even-handed politics with similarly assured thrills."

Nicola Chan of the SCMP Young Post wrote: "There are, however, some logical flaws in the plot. While Park is a highly skilled double agent, there are a few traps in the movie that even he shouldn't have been able to avoid. And the ending, while touching, is somewhat cliché."

David Ehrlich of IndieWire rated the film B− and wrote: "A twisty, hyper-talkative historical epic that peers behind the curtain of political theater to offer a peek at how North and South Korea really stay in touch, Yoon Jong-bin's 'The Spy Gone North' tells a true-ish story about all the invisible people who have to be sacrificed for these two rival countries to sustain their mutual self-interests." He continued: "If the noose-tightening third act never becomes quite as suspenseful as it should, that's because the movie is either unwilling or unable to disentangle itself from all of the messy political intrigue and focus on Park's desperate search for a way out — for even the open door he'd be presented by the slightest display of humanity."

=== Box office ===
The film finished second during its opening week behind Along with the Gods: The Last 49 Days, with US$15.7 million gross over five days of screening (Wednesday to Sunday). On its second weekend, the film finished second behind The Witness, with a 45% drop in gross to US$6.3 million. After finishing second for two consecutive weekends, the film placed third during its third weekend, behind On Your Wedding Day and The Witness. It had a 59% drop in gross, earning US$2.6 million from 317,447 attendance.

On August 28, 2018, the film reached its break-even point with 4.7 million audience members having watched the film. During its fourth weekend, the film had a 74% drop in gross compared to its third weekend, finishing in seventh place with 86,336 attendance. The film stable in seventh place during its fifth weekend.

As of September 24, 2018, the film grossed US$38.3 million from 4,970,004 total attendance.

== Awards and nominations ==
| Awards | Category | Recipient | Result | Ref. |
|---|---|---|---|---|
| 27th Buil Film Awards | Best Film | The Spy Gone North | Won | |
| 27th Buil Film Awards | Best Director | Yoon Jong-bin | Nominated | |
| 27th Buil Film Awards | Best Actor | Hwang Jung-min | Nominated | |
| 27th Buil Film Awards | Best Actor | Lee Sung-min | Won | |
| 27th Buil Film Awards | Best Supporting Actor | Ju Ji-hoon | Won | |
| 27th Buil Film Awards | Best Screenplay | Kwon Sung-hwi & Yoon Jong-bin | Won | |
| 27th Buil Film Awards | Best Art Direction | Park Il-hyun | Won | |
| 55th Grand Bell Awards | Best Film | The Spy Gone North | Nominated | |
| 55th Grand Bell Awards | Best Director | Yoon Jong-bin | Nominated | |
| 55th Grand Bell Awards | Best Actor | Hwang Jung-min | Won | |
| 55th Grand Bell Awards | Best Actor | Lee Sung-min | Won | |
| 55th Grand Bell Awards | Best Supporting Actor | Gi Ju-bong | Nominated | |
| 55th Grand Bell Awards | Best Screenplay | Kwon Sung-hwi & Yoon Jong-bin | Nominated | |
| 55th Grand Bell Awards | Best Cinematography | Choi Chan-min | Nominated | |
| 55th Grand Bell Awards | Best Editing | Kim Sang-bum & Kim Jae-bum | Nominated | |
| 55th Grand Bell Awards | Best Art Direction | Park Il-hyun | Won | |
| 55th Grand Bell Awards | Best Lightning | Yoo Suk-moon | Nominated | |
| 55th Grand Bell Awards | Best Costume Design | Chae Kyung-hwa | Nominated | |
| 55th Grand Bell Awards | Technical Award | The Spy Gone North | Nominated | |
| 55th Grand Bell Awards | Best Planning | The Spy Gone North | Nominated | |
| 2nd The Seoul Awards | Best Film | The Spy Gone North | Won | |
| 2nd The Seoul Awards | Best Actor | Lee Sung-min | Nominated | |
| 2nd The Seoul Awards | Best Supporting Actor | Ju Ji-hoon | Won | |
| 38th Korean Association of Film Critics Awards | Top 11 Films | The Spy Gone North | Won | |
| 38th Korean Association of Film Critics Awards | Best Director | Yoon Jong-bin | Won | |
| 38th Korean Association of Film Critics Awards | Best Actor | Lee Sung-min | Won | |
| 38th Korean Association of Film Critics Awards | Best Supporting Actor | Ju Ji-hoon | Won | |
| 39th Blue Dragon Film Awards | Best Film | The Spy Gone North | Nominated | |
| 39th Blue Dragon Film Awards | Best Director | Yoon Jong-bin | Won | |
| 39th Blue Dragon Film Awards | Best Screenplay | Kwon Sung-hwi & Yoon Jong-bin | Nominated | |
| 39th Blue Dragon Film Awards | Best Actor | Lee Sung-min | Nominated | |
| 39th Blue Dragon Film Awards | Best Supporting Actor | Ju Ji-hoon | Nominated | |
| 39th Blue Dragon Film Awards | Best Cinematography and Lightning | Choi Chan-min & Yoon Suk-moon | Nominated | |
| 39th Blue Dragon Film Awards | Best Editing | Kim Sang-bum & Kim Jae-bum | Nominated | |
| 39th Blue Dragon Film Awards | Best Music | Jo Yeong-wook | Nominated | |
| 39th Blue Dragon Film Awards | Best Art Direction | Park Il-hyun | Won | |
| 26th Korea Culture and Entertainment Awards | Best Film | The Spy Gone North | Won | |
| 5th Korean Film Producers Association Awards | Best Cinematography | Choi Chan-min | Won | |
| 5th Korean Film Producers Association Awards | Best Lighting | Yoo Seok-moon | Won | |
| 5th Korean Film Producers Association Awards | Best Art Direction | Park Il-hyun | Won | |
| 18th Director's Cut Awards | Best Actor | Lee Sung-min | Won | |
| 10th KOFRA Film Awards | Best Film | The Spy Gone North | Won | |
| 10th KOFRA Film Awards | Best Actor | Lee Sung-min | Won | |
| 10th KOFRA Film Awards | Best Supporting Actor | Ju Ji-hoon | Won | |
| 55th Baeksang Arts Awards | Best Film | The Spy Gone North | Won | |
| 55th Baeksang Arts Awards | Best Director | Yoon Jong-bin | Nominated | |
| 55th Baeksang Arts Awards | Best Actor | Lee Sung-min | Won | |
| 55th Baeksang Arts Awards | Best Screenplay | Kwon Sung-hwi & Yoon Jong-bin | Nominated | |
| 55th Baeksang Arts Awards | Technical Award | Park Il-hyun (Art) | Nominated | |
