= 27th Buil Film Awards =

2018 edition of award ceremony

- Date: October 5, 2018

The 27th Buil Film Awards (Korean: 부일영화상) ceremony was hosted by the Busan-based daily newspaper Busan Ilbo. The ceremony was held on October 5, 2018.

== Winners and nominees ==
Complete list of nominees and winner:

(Winners denoted in bold)

Best Film	Best Director
**The Spy Gone North**; 1987: When the Day Comes; The Fortress; Burning; Claire's Camera	**Lee Chang-dong** - **Burning**; Jang Joon-hwan - 1987: When the Day Comes; Yoon Jong-bin - The Spy Gone North; Hwang Dong-hyuk - The Fortress; Kim Yong-hwa - Along with the Gods: The Two Worlds, Along with the Gods: The Last 49 Days
Best Actor	Best Actress
**Lee Sung-min** - **The Spy Gone North**; Kim Yoon-seok - 1987: When the Day Comes; Hwang Jung-min - The Spy Gone North; Gi Ju-bong - Merry Christmas Mr. Mo; Yoo Ah-in - Burning	**Kim Hee-ae** - **Herstory**; Kim Tae-ri - Little Forest; Esom - Microhabitat; Na Moon-hee - I Can Speak; Yum Jung-ah - The Mimic
Best Supporting Actor	Best Supporting Actress
**Ju Ji-hoon** - **The Spy Gone North**; Jo Woo-jin - 1987: When the Day Comes; Kim Joo-hyuk - Believer; Park Hae-joon - Believer; Steven Yeun - Burning	**Kim Sun-young** - **Herstory**; Hong Seung-yi - Jamsil; Lee Joo-young - Believer; Jin Seo-yeon - Believer; Jo Min-su - The Witch: Part 1. The Subversion
Best New Actor	Best New Actress
**Kim Choong-gil** - **Loser's Adventure**; Oh Seung-hoon - Method; Lee Yi-kyung - Baby Beside Me; Lee Ga-sub - The Seeds of Violence; Kim Jun-han - Herstory	**Kim Da-mi** - **The Witch: Part 1. The Subversion**; Jin Ki-joo - Little Forest; Kim Ka-hee - Park Hwa-young; Jeon Jong-seo - Burning; Jang Sun - Communication and Lies
Best New Director	Best Screenplay
**Jeon Go-woon** - **Microhabitat**; Lim Dae-hyung - Merry Christmas Mr. Mo; Kang Yoon-sung - The Outlaws; Moon So-ri - The Running Actress; Kim Soo-jung - A Blue Mouthed Face	**Kwon Sung-hwi**, **Yoon Jong-bin** - **The Spy Gone North**; Kim Kyung-chan - 1987: When the Day Comes; Hwang Dong-hyuk - The Fortress; Oh Jung-mi, Lee Chang-dong - Burning; Yoo Seung-hee - I Can Speak
Best Cinematography	Best Music
**Kim Woo-hyung** - **1987: When the Day Comes**; Kim Ji-yong - The Fortress; Kim Tae-kyung - Believer; Hong Kyung-pyo - Burning; Lee Mo-gae - Illang: The Wolf Brigade	**Mowg** - **Burning**; Kim Tae-seong - 1987: When the Day Comes; Ryuichi Sakamoto - The Fortress; Dalpalan - Believer; Bang Joon-seok - Sunset in My Hometown
Best Art Direction	Popular Star Awards
**Park Il-hyun** - **The Spy Gone North**; Chae Kyung-sun - The Fortress; Lee Ha-joon - Believer; Lee Mok-won - Along with the Gods: The Two Worlds, Along with the Gods: The Last 49 Days; Jo Hwa-sung - Illang: The Wolf Brigade	**Do Kyung-soo** - **Along with the Gods: The Last 49 Days**; **Kim Hyang-gi** - **Along with the Gods: The Last 49 Days**
Yu Hyun-mok Film Arts Award
**Oji Film**
