= The Seoul Awards =

South Korean entertainment awards

- Current: 2nd The Seoul Awards
- Awarded for: Excellence in film and television
- Sponsored by: Sports Seoul
- Country: South Korea
- First award: 2017
- Final award: 2018
- Website: https://theseoulawards.com/screening/institution

Television/radio coverage
- Network: SBS
- Produced by: Plusis Media

The Seoul Awards (Korean: 더 서울어워즈) is an annual awards ceremony hosted by Sports Seoul. It recognizes and honors outstanding achievements in the fields of film and television. Established in 2017, the event has become a significant occasion in the Korean entertainment industry.

== Ceremony ==
No.	Year	Location	Host	Ref.
1st	2017	Kyung Hee University	Jun Hyun-moo, Kim Ah-joong	
2nd	2018	Kyung Hee University	Jun Hyun-moo, Kim Ah-joong	

== Categories ==
- Grand Prize
- Best Actor
- Best Actress
- Best Supporting Actor
- Best Supporting Actress
- Best New Actor
- Best New Actress
- Special Acting Award
- Popularity Award

== Film ==
=== Grand Prize ===
No.	Year	Winner
1st	2017	Anarchist from Colony
2nd	2018	The Spy Gone North

=== Best Actor ===
No.	Year	Winner	Film
1st	2017	Song Kang-ho	A Taxi Driver
2nd	2018	Ha Jung-woo	Along with the Gods: The Two Worlds

=== Best Actress ===
No.	Year	Winner	Film
1st	2017	Na Moon-hee	I Can Speak
2nd	2018	Son Ye-jin	Be with You

=== Best Supporting Actor ===
No.	Year	Winner	Film
1st	2017	Kim Joo-hyuk	Confidential Assignment
2nd	2018	Ju Ji-hoon	Along with the Gods: The Two Worlds, The Spy Gone North

=== Best Supporting Actress ===
No.	Year	Winner	Film
1st	2017	Lee Jung-hyun	The Battleship Island
2nd	2018	Ye Soo-jung	Along with the Gods: The Two Worlds

=== Best New Actor ===
No.	Year	Winner	Film
1st	2017	Ryu Jun-yeol	The King
2nd	2018	Nam Joo-hyuk	The Great Battle

=== Best New Actress ===
No.	Year	Winner	Film
1st	2017	Choi Hee-seo	Anarchist from Colony
2nd	2018	Kim Da-mi	The Witch: Part 1. The Subversion

== Drama ==
=== Grand Prize ===
No.	Year	Winner
1st	2017	Stranger
2nd	2018	My Mister

=== Best Actor ===
No.	Year	Winner	Drama
1st	2017	Ji Sung	Innocent Defendant
2nd	2018	Lee Byung-hun	Mr. Sunshine

=== Best Actress ===
No.	Year	Winner	Drama
1st	2017	Park Bo-young	Strong Girl Bong-soon
2nd	2018	Kim Nam-joo	Misty

=== Best Supporting Actor ===
No.	Year	Winner	Drama
1st	2017	Jung Sang-hoon	The Lady in Dignity
2nd	2018	Yoo Yeon-seok	Mr. Sunshine

=== Best Supporting Actress ===
No.	Year	Winner	Drama
1st	2017	Lee Hanee	The Rebel
2nd	2018	Moon So-ri	Life

=== Best New Actor ===
No.	Year	Winner	Drama
1st	2017	Kim Min-seok	Innocent Defendant
2nd	2018	Park Hae-soo	Prison Playbook

=== Best New Actress ===
No.	Year	Winner	Drama
1st	2017	Yoon So-hee	The Emperor: Owner of the Mask
2nd	2018	Jo Bo-ah	Goodbye to Goodbye

== Other awards ==
=== Special Acting Award ===
No.	Year	Winner	Work
1st	2017	Kim Su-an	The Battleship Island
2nd	2018	Huh Joon-ho	Come and Hug Me

=== Popular Actor Award ===
No.	Year	Winner
1st	2017	Yim Si-wan
1st	2017	Park Hyung-sik
2nd	2018	Do Kyung-soo
2nd	2018	Jung Hae-in

=== Popular Actress Award ===
No.	Year	Winner
1st	2017	Im Yoon-ah
1st	2017	Kim Se-jeong
2nd	2018	Son Ye-jin
2nd	2018	Seohyun

=== Hallyu Artist Award ===
No.	Year	Winner
2nd	2018	Jung Hae-in

== See also ==
- List of Asian television awards
