= The Witch: Part 1. The Subversion =

2018 film directed by Park Hoon-jung

- Theatrical release poster
- Hangul: 마녀
- Hanja: 魔女
- RR: Manyeo
- MR: Manyŏ
- Directed by: Park Hoon-jung
- Written by: Park Hoon-jung
- Produced by: Park Hoon-jung; Yeon Young-sik
- Starring: Kim Da-mi; Jo Min-su; Park Hee-soon; Choi Woo-shik
- Cinematography: Kim Young-ho; Lee Teo
- Edited by: Kim Chang-ju
- Music by: Mowg
- Production company: Gold Moon Film Production
- Distributed by: Warner Bros. Pictures
- Release date: 27 June 2018
- Running time: 125 minutes
- Country: South Korea
- Language: Korean
- Budget: US$5.5 million
- Box office: US$24.4 million

The Witch: Part 1. The Subversion (Korean: 마녀; RR: Manyeo) is a 2018 South Korean science fiction action horror film written and directed by Park Hoon-jung. With Kim Da-mi in the lead role as an escaped superhuman prodigy, it explores the consequences of irresponsible transhumanist experimentation. A sequel, The Witch: Part 2. The Other One, was released on 15 June 2022.

== Plot ==
A young girl escapes from a mysterious laboratory after a violent incident that leaves many dead. Two members who run the lab, Dr. Baek and Mr. Choi, considered her dead. The girl collapses on a farm, where she is discovered by the owners, Mr. and Mrs. Goo. His wife nurses the girl back to health and adopts her.

10 years later, the girl, named Ja-yoon, is living a normal life, apparently without any memory of her past. Her family is struggling financially, her mother is showing early signs of dementia, and Ja-yoon is suffering periodic, severe headaches. To earn money, she decides to audition for a national singing contest that promises a large cash prize. She impresses the judges with her special talent - the telekinetic ability to make the microphone levitate. This makes Dr. Baek and Mr Choi realize that Ja-yoon is the girl who escaped and they send men to recapture her.

On her way to Seoul for the second round of the audition, Ja-yoon is approached by a man named Nobleman, who claims to know her. After the audition, she avoids an abduction by Dr. Baek's men. A group of armed men barges into her home and holds her family at gunpoint. Seeming to enter a trance, Ja-yoon dispatches the men with superhuman strength and speed. She is left shaken, apparently not understanding either her superhuman or psionic abilities. Nobleman demands that she accompany him or he will kill her parents. She agrees and is taken to the laboratory, where she is restrained.

Dr. Baek explains that she created Ja-yoon, genetically modifying her to have superpowers. Ja-yoon's headaches are a symptom of a disease that will kill her without proper treatment. She has her injected with a blue serum that will stop the disease for a month, leaving Ja-yoon dependent on new doses. After the injection, Ja-yoon's demeanor changes and she reveals the truth - she never lost her memory and has always known what she is. After visiting a doctor by herself and being told that without a bone marrow transplant from a blood relative, she only has a few months left to live, she decided to track down Dr. Baek for the cure. Not knowing how to find her, she purposefully revealed her abilities during the audition to draw the attention of her creators.

With the serum restoring her to full strength, Ja-yoon escapes her bonds and kills her guards. Holding Dr. Baek at gunpoint she demands to know where the serum is produced. It is around this time that Mr. Choi comes, having heard about Ja-yoon, but she kills him with ease. She defeats the Nobleman but Dr. Baek is killed during the chaos. Ja-yoon burns the building down and visits her parents, providing her father with some of the serum to give her mother to help slow the spread of her dementia. Her father alludes to always having known what Ja-yoon could do.

Three months later, Ja-yoon appears in the home of Dr. Baek's twin sister. She gives her more vials of the serum. A mysterious young woman, whose face is covered in scars, approaches Ja-yoon but Ja-yoon threatens to kill her if she touches her and the screen goes to black.

== Cast ==
- Kim Da-mi as Ja-yoon
- Jo Min-su as Dr. Baek
- Park Hee-soon as Mr. Choi
- Choi Woo-shik as Gwigongja (Nobleman)
- Go Min-si as Do Myung-hee
- Choi Jung-woo as Teacher Goo
- Oh Mi-hee as Teacher Goo's wife
- Kim Byeong-ok as Police Officer Do
- Jung Da-eun as Ginmeori (Girl with long hair)
- Lee Joo Won as CEO Sung

== Production ==
In June 2018, it was reported that Kim Da-mi, Jo Min-su, Choi Woo-shik and Park Hee-soon were starring in the film. Kim Da-mi was selected from 1,500 candidates to play the role.

== Reception ==
=== Critical response ===
On review aggregator Rotten Tomatoes, the film holds an approval rating of 89% based on 18 reviews, with an average rating of 8.7/10.

Elizabeth Kerr of The Hollywood Reporter gave a positive review and wrote, "An ever-so-delicate twist on the Korean revenge thriller. By Korean action standards, The Witch: Part 1. The Subversion is lean at two hours, but in cramming so much into the narrative it stumbles over itself on more than one occasion; it very often forgets its internal logic and drags the showdown out to the breaking point."

Rafael Motamayor of Flickering Myth rated the film 4/5 and wrote, "Despite trying to cram too much plot, the film's atmospheric score, action sequences and visuals keep you invested in the story and what comes next."

=== Box office ===
The film opened in South Korea on June 27, 2018. During its debut weekend, the film finished in first place, ending The Accidental Detective 2: In Action 2-week box office reign. It sold more than 735,000 tickets from 1,117 screens from Friday to Sunday, with US$6 million gross during its opening weekend. In its second weekend, the film finished in second place behind Ant-Man and the Wasp, dropping 40% from the last weekend with US$3.5 million gross from 451,113 tickets sold. Grossing US$3.1 million on its third weekend, the film finished third behind Ant-Man and the Wasp and newcomer Skyscraper. As of August 23, the film attracted 3,189,092 moviegoers and earned US$24,377,666.

== Awards and nominations ==
Awards	Category	Recipient	Result	Ref.
22nd Fantasia International Film Festival	Best Actress	Kim Da-mi	Won	
27th Buil Film Awards	Best Supporting Actress	Jo Min-su	Nominated	
27th Buil Film Awards	Best New Actress	Kim Da-mi	Won	
55th Grand Bell Awards	Best New Actress	Kim Da-mi	Won	
55th Grand Bell Awards	Best Actress	Kim Da-mi	Nominated	
55th Grand Bell Awards	Best Supporting Actress	Go Min-si	Nominated	
55th Grand Bell Awards	Technical Award	The Witch: Part 1. The Subversion	Nominated	
3rd London Asian Film Festival	Rising Star Award	Kim Da-mi	Won	
2nd The Seoul Awards	Best New Actress	Kim Da-mi	Won	
39th Blue Dragon Film Awards	Best New Actress	Kim Da-mi	Won	
39th Blue Dragon Film Awards	Technical Award (Stunts)	Park Jeong-ryool & Kim Jeong-min (Stunts)	Nominated	
18th Director's Cut Awards	Best New Actress	Kim Da-mi	Won	
10th KOFRA Film Awards	Best New Actress	Kim Da-mi	Won	
55th Baeksang Arts Awards	Best New Actress	Kim Da-mi	Nominated	
55th Baeksang Arts Awards	Best Supporting Actress	Jo Min-su	Nominated	
24th Chunsa Film Art Awards	Best New Actress	Kim Da-mi	Nominated	
24th Chunsa Film Art Awards	Best Supporting Actress	Jo Min-su	Nominated	
2nd China Korea International Film Festival	Best Supporting Actress	Jo Min-su	Won	
2nd China Korea International Film Festival	Popularity Award	Jo Min-su	Won	
39th Fantasporto Film Festival	Best Film Orient Express	The Witch: Part 1. The Subversion	Won	
26th Gérardmer International Fantastic Film Festival	Syfy Jury Prize	The Witch: Part 1. The Subversion	Won	
