= 5th Wildflower Film Awards =

2018 edition of award ceremony

- Date: April 12, 2018
- Site: Literature House, Seoul

The 5th Wildflower Film Awards (Korean: 들꽃영화상) is an awards ceremony recognizing the achievements of Korean independent and low-budget films. It was held at the Literature House in Seoul on April 12, 2018.

This year awards includes a new category for Best Music and Best Producer. A total of 13 prizes were handed out to films nominated across 10 categories for both documentary and narrative works, each with a budget under ₩1 billion (US$890,000) and released theatrically between January 1 and December 31, 2017.

== Nominations and winners ==
(Winners denoted in bold)

Grand Prize	Lifetime Achievement Award
**Bamseom Pirates Seoul Inferno**	**Busan Independent Film Society**
Best Director (Narrative Films)	Best Director (Documentaries)
**Hong Sang-soo** – **The Day After**; Cho Hyun-hoon – Jane; Hong Sang-soo – On the Beach at Night Alone; Kim Dae-hwan – The First Lap; Lim Dae-hyung – Merry Christmas Mr. Mo; Moon So-ri – The Running Actress; Park Suk-young – Ash Flower; Shin Dong-il – Come, Together	**Moon Chang-yong, Jeon Jin** – **Becoming Who I Was**; Choi Seung-ho – Criminal Conspiracy; Jung Yoon-suk – Bamseom Pirates Seoul Inferno; Kim Tae-il, Ju Romy – All Live, Olive; Lee Chang-jae – Our President
Best Actor	Best Actress
**Gi Ju-bong** – **Merry Christmas Mr. Mo**; Cho Hyun-chul – The First Lap; Koo Kyo-hwan – Jane; Kwon Hae-hyo – The Day After; Lee Yi-kyung – Baby Beside Me; Nam Yeon-woo – Lost to Shame	**Lee Min-ji** -– **Jane**; Jeong Ha-dam – Ash Flower; Kim Min-hee – On the Beach at Night Alone; Kim Sae-byuk - The First Lap; Lee Hye-eun – Come, Together; Lee Soo-kyung – Yongsoon
Best Screenplay	Best Cinematography
**Cho Hyun-hoon, Kim So-mi** – **Jane**; Han Ji-soo – Come, Together; Kim Yang-hee – The Poet and the Boy; Lim Dae-hyung – Merry Christmas Mr. Mo; Shin Yeon-shick – Romans 8:37	**Cho Young-jik** – **Jane**; Moon Myung-hwan – Merry Christmas Mr. Mo; Park Hong-yeol, Kim Hyung-ku – On the Beach at Night Alone
Best Music	Best Producer
**Flash Flood Darlings** – **Jane**; Bang Jun-seok – Becoming Who I Was; Jang Young-gyu, Lee Tae-won – Our President	**An Bo-young** – **Ash Flower**
Best New Director (Narrative Films)	Best New Director (Documentaries)
**Lim Dae-hyung** – **Merry Christmas Mr. Mo**; Cho Hyun-hoon – Jane; Kim Yang-hee – The Poet and the Boy; Ko Bong-soo – Delta Boys; Shin Joon – Yongsoon	**Kim Young-jo** – **Still and All**; Lee Seung-moon – Dance Sports Girls; Woo Kwang-hoon, David Redman – Dancing with Jikji; Yoon Se-young – Marianne and Margaret
Best New Actor/Actress	Best Supporting Actor/Actress
**Oh Seung-hoon** – **Method**; Baek Seung-hwan, Kim Choong-gil, Yoon Ji-hye, Shin Min-jae, Lee Woong-bin – Delta Boys; Jang Seon – Communication & Lies; Jung Ga-ram – The Poet and the Boy; Lee Soo-kyung – Yongsoon	**Kim Sun-young** – **Happy Bus Day**; Jeon Hye-jin - The Poet and the Boy; Kim Sun-young – Communication & Lies; Park Myung-hoon – Ash Flower
