= Bamseom Pirates =

Defunct South Korean grindcore band

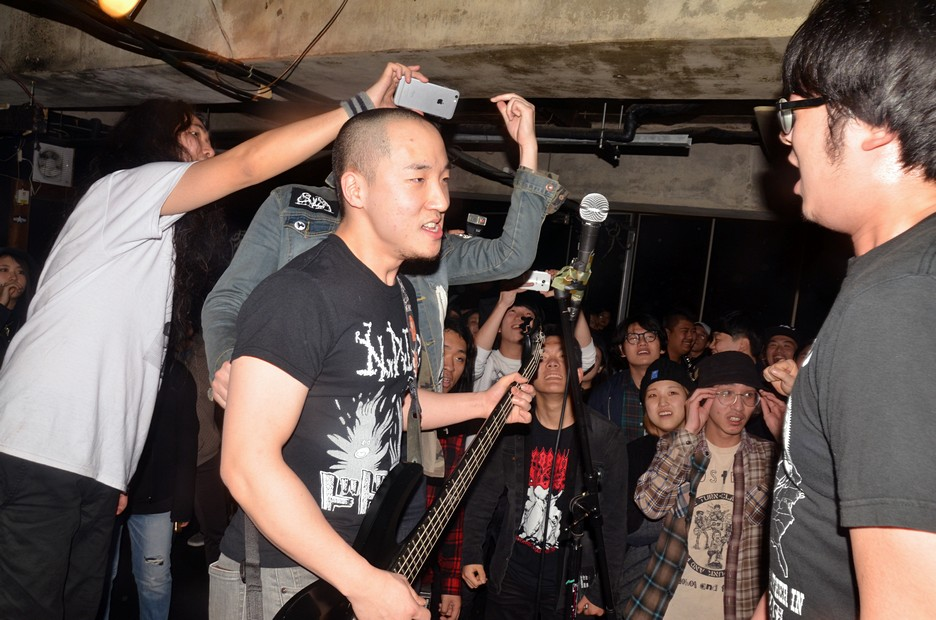
- Bamseom Pirates perform at GBN Live House in Seoul on January 21, 2017

Background information
- Origin: Seoul, South Korea
- Genres: Grindcore; hardcore punk
- Years active: 2005–2012, then off and on
- Labels: Bissantrophy, Jarip
- Members: Gwon Yong-man (drums, chorus); Jang Seong-geon (vocal, bass)
- Past members: Lee Ji-won (guitar), Kim Jun-yeong (bass)

Bamseom Pirates (Korean: 밤섬해적단) was a grindcore band from Seoul, South Korea. Their work is marked by satire, and they frequently parody South Korean and North Korean governments and ideologies.

In July 2010, they released their first album, Seoul Inferno. The album contained 42 tracks, but due to the short song length the album runtime is less than an hour.

They announced their breakup on September 8, 2012, but have continued to be active infrequently. In 2013 they played the local Sun Eaters Fest as well as Zandari Festa, and also released a new album, Kimjongill Carsex. However, they have remained inactive despite a few infrequent appearances.

== Film appearances ==
In 2010 and 2011, they took part in the redevelopment protest at Duriban in the Hongdae area, where they helped launch the independent musicians collective, Jarip, and organized the first two 51+ festivals. Their involvement was filmed and appeared in the 2014 film Party 51 by Jung Yong-taek.

They later appeared in the 2017 documentary Bamseom Pirates Seoul Inferno which showed them struggling with governmental censorship and societal hypocrisy. Also featured in the movie is Park Jung-geun, owner of Bissantrophy Records, who had been imprisoned for two months for posting parody tweets about North Korea and retweeting North Korean propaganda. The film premiered at the 2017 International Film Festival Rotterdam and won awards at the 2017 Yamagata International Documentary Film Festival and 2018 5th Wildflower Film Awards.

== Discography ==
- 2010 – Seoul Inferno
- 2010 Jarip compilation vol. 1
- 2011 split album with Ankle Attack
- 2013 Kimjongill Carsex EP
- 2014 "Party 51" soundtrack
