= Merry Christmas Mr. Mo =

- Film poster
- Hangul: 메리 크리스마스 미스터 모
- RR: Meri Keuriseumaseu miseuteo Mo
- MR: Meri K'ŭrisŭmasŭ misŭt'ŏ Mo
- Directed by: Lim Dae-hyung
- Screenplay by: Lim Dae-hyung
- Produced by: Park Doo-hee
- Starring: Gi Ju-bong; Oh Jung-hwan; Go Won-hee; Jeon Yeo-been
- Cinematography: Moon Myung-hwan
- Edited by: Park Se-young
- Music by: Ha Hyeon-jin
- Production companies: Indiestory; Film Run; Korean Film Council
- Release dates: October 2016 (Busan); December 14, 2017 (South Korea)
- Running time: 101 minutes
- Country: South Korea
- Language: Korean

Merry Christmas Mr. Mo (Korean: 메리 크리스마스 미스터 모) is a 2016 South Korean comedy drama film. Shot in black and white, it was written and directed by first-time director Lim Dae-hyung and stars Gi Ju-bong, Oh Jung-hwan, Go Won-hee and Jeon Yeo-been.

== Plot ==
Widower and barber Mo Geum-san (Gi Ju-bong) is terminally ill. His dying wish is to make a short film directed by his estranged son, Stephen (Oh Jung-hwan).

== Cast ==
- Gi Ju-bong as Mo Geum-san
- Oh Jung-hwan as Stephen
- Go Won-hee as Ye-won
- Jeon Yeo-been as Ja-yeong
- Kim Hak-sun as Yong-ho
- Kim Jung-young as Yeon-jeong

== Awards and nominations ==
Year	Award	Category	Recipient	Result	Ref
2016	21st Busan International Film Festival	NETPAC Award	Lim Dae-hyung	Won	
2018	5th Wildflower Film Awards	Best Director (Narrative Films)	Lim Dae-hyung	Nominated	
2018	5th Wildflower Film Awards	Best Actor	Gi Ju-bong	Won	
2018	5th Wildflower Film Awards	Best Screenplay	Lim Dae-hyung	Nominated	
2018	5th Wildflower Film Awards	Best Cinematography	Moon Myung-hwan	Nominated	
2018	5th Wildflower Film Awards	Best New Director (Narrative Films)	Lim Dae-hyung	Won	
2018	27th Buil Film Awards	Best Actor	Gi Ju-bong	Nominated	
2018	27th Buil Film Awards	Best New Director	Lim Dae-hyung	Nominated	
2018	55th Grand Bell Awards	Best New Director	Lim Dae-hyung	Nominated	
