= Lim Dae-hyung =

South Korean film director (born 1986)

- Born: July 28, 1986 (age 40); South Korea
- Education: Hanyang University
- Occupations: Film director, screenwriter

Korean name
- Hangul: 임대형
- RR: Im Daehyeong
- MR: Im Taehyŏng

Lim Dae-hyung (Korean: 임대형; born 28 July 1986) is a South Korean film director and screenwriter.

== Personal life ==
Born in 1986, Lim graduated from Geumsan High School. He majored in Theatre & Film at Hanyang University.

== Filmography ==
- Lemon Time (short, 2012) - director, screenwriter
- The World of If (short, 2014) - director, screenwriter
- Merry Christmas Mr. Mo (2017) - director, screenwriter
- Moonlit Winter (2019) - director, screenwriter

== Awards ==
Year	Award	Category	Nominated work	Result
2016	21st Busan International Film Festival	New Currents Award	Merry Christmas Mr. Mo	Nominated
2016	21st Busan International Film Festival	NETPAC Award	Merry Christmas Mr. Mo	Won
2018	5th Wildflower Film Awards	Best Director	Merry Christmas Mr. Mo	Nominated
2018	5th Wildflower Film Awards	Best Screenplay	Merry Christmas Mr. Mo	Nominated
2018	5th Wildflower Film Awards	Best New Director	Merry Christmas Mr. Mo	Won
2018	19th Busan Film Critics Awards	Best New Director	Merry Christmas Mr. Mo	Won
2018	27th Buil Film Awards	Best New Director	Merry Christmas Mr. Mo	Nominated
2018	55th Grand Bell Awards	Best New Director	Merry Christmas Mr. Mo	Nominated
2018	23rd Chunsa Film Art Awards	Best New Director	Merry Christmas Mr. Mo	Nominated
2019	Cine 21 Awards	Top 10 Films of the Year	Moonlit Winter	8th place
2020	7th Wildflower Film Awards	Best Director	Moonlit Winter	Nominated
2020	29th Buil Film Awards	Best Director	Moonlit Winter	Nominated
2020	25th Chunsa Film Art Awards	Best Director	Moonlit Winter	Nominated
2020	25th Chunsa Film Art Awards	Best Screenplay	Moonlit Winter	Nominated
2020	56th Baeksang Arts Awards	Best Screenplay	Moonlit Winter	Nominated
2020	40th Korean Association of Film Critics Awards	Best Director	Moonlit Winter	Won
2020	40th Korean Association of Film Critics Awards	Best Screenplay	Moonlit Winter	Won
2021	41st Blue Dragon Film Awards	Best Director	Moonlit Winter	Won
2021	41st Blue Dragon Film Awards	Best Screenplay	Moonlit Winter	Won
2024	60th Baeksang Arts Awards	Best Director – Television	LTNS (with Jeon Go-woon)	Nominated
2024	2024 Asia Contents Awards & Global OTT Awards	Best Director	LTNS (with Jeon Go-woon)	Nominated

=== Honours ===
- Jury member at the 2024 Busan International Film Festival for its competition section 'Sonje Award'.
