= The Phone (film) =

The Phone (NYE POORA)
- Poster
- Hangul: 더 폰
- RR: Deo pon
- MR: Tŏ p'on
- Directed by: Kim Bong-ju
- Starring: Son Hyun-joo
- Distributed by: Next Entertainment World
- Release date: October 22, 2015
- Running time: 115 minutes
- Country: South Korea
- Language: Korean
- Box office: $ 1.4 million USD

The Phone (Korean: 더 폰) is a 2015 South Korean sci-fi action thriller film directed by Kim Bong-ju. The film is the directorial debut of the director. It was released on October 22, 2015. This film is not to be confused with another South Korean film of similar title but released in 2002 or with the American TV series and the Dutch TV reality show both of which have the same title as this film.

== Plot ==
A man (Son Hyun-joo) became broken-hearted after the murder of his wife (Uhm Ji-won). A magnetic field anomaly allows him to talk on the telephone with his wife from the past. Can he prevent her murder?

== Cast ==
- Son Hyun-joo as Ko Dong-Ho
- Uhm Ji-won as Jo Yeong-Soo
- Bae Seong-woo as Do Jae-Hyun
- Hwang Bo-ra as Kim Hye-Jin
- Roh Jeong-eui as Ko Kyung-Rim
- Jang In-sub as Department Head Kim
- Jo Dal-Hwan as Kim Gyu-Soo
- Lee Cheol-Min as Son Suk-Ho
- Park Ji-So as Do Soo-Jung
- Hwang Suk-Jung as Seo Kwang-Hyun
- Kim Jong-Goo as Park Se-Moon
- Lee Soo-In as resident
- Kim Ki-Cheon as police substation chief
- Lee Sang-Hwa as hunting man
- Song Bong-Geun as Detective Song

== Reception ==
The film was number-one on its opening weekend, with ₩5.78 billion. By its third weekend, it had earned ₩12.1 billion.
