= Bel Ami (South Korean TV series) =

2013 Television series

- Promotional poster for Bel Ami
- Also known as: Pretty Boy; Beautiful Man; Beautiful Guy
- Hangul: 예쁜 남자
- Hanja: 예쁜 男子
- Lit.: Pretty Man
- RR: Yeppeun namja
- MR: Yeppŭn namja
- Genre: Romance; Comedy
- Based on: Pretty Man by Chon Kye-young
- Written by: Yoo Young-ah
- Directed by: Lee Jae-sang; Jung Jung-hwa; Shin Yong-hwi
- Starring: Jang Keun-suk; IU; Lee Jang-woo; Han Chae-young
- Country of origin: South Korea
- Original language: Korean
- No. of episodes: 16

Production
- Executive producer: Kwak Ki-won
- Producer: Lee Jin-seo
- Running time: Wednesdays and Thursdays at 22:00 (KST)
- Production companies: Group 8 Pineapple Holdings

Original release
- Network: KBS2
- Release: November 20, 2013 – January 9, 2014

Bel Ami (Korean: 예쁜 남자; RR: Yeppeun namja; lit. 'Pretty Man') is a 2013–2014 South Korean romantic comedy television series starring Jang Keun-suk, IU, Lee Jang-woo, and Han Chae-young. Based on the same-titled 17-volume manhwa by Chon Kye-young, it aired on KBS2 from November 20, 2013, to January 9, 2014, on Wednesdays and Thursdays at 22:00 (KST) for 16 episodes.

== Synopsis ==
Dokgo Ma-te (Jang Keun-suk) is a pretty boy. His mother dies without giving him the password to meet his father, whom he never knew. Ma-te's mother gives it instead to Hong Yoo-ra (Han Chae-young), an ex-heiress who was once the daughter-in-law of a wealthy family. A family that she thinks Ma-te's father is the chairman of. Yoo-ra promises to give him the password if he conquers several women and learns valuable lessons from each of them so as to conquer Na Hong-ran, Yoo-ra's ex mother-in-law and the Chairman Park Ki-suk's wife, who is evil and ruthless. But then Kim Bo-tong (IU), an ordinary girl from a poor background decides to aid Ma-te in pursuing his father's heels. She has had a huge crush on him since high school and is willing to do anything to help him succeed. Despite himself, Ma-te falls for Bo-tong. But Choi David (Lee Jang-woo), who is also the Chairman's secret son and is like the male Bo-tong, falls for her too, leading into a conflict of romance and deception.

== Cast ==
=== Main ===
- Jang Keun-suk as Dokgo Ma-te

A boy who discovered as early as kindergarten that he was prettier than most and could get special treatment because of it. During his school years he never once had to bring lunch to school, and now only has to glance at designer stuff in stores for rich women to purchase them for him. He discovers he has a wealthy father who he doesn't remember. His role within the drama is to learn different things from dating/seducing ten wealthy ladies, so that he can eventually undertake the role of meeting with his father.

- IU as Kim Bo-tong

An average girl from Ma-te's neighborhood who's had an unrequited crush on him since junior high. She is innocent and free hearted who is head over heels in love with Ma-te and helps him through his journey of overcoming troubles to meet his father. Her name, Bo-tong means 'average' in Hangul.

- Lee Jang-woo as David Choi

A friendly, free-spirited marketing director who falls for Bo-tong and helps her out. He has a strange past too, however also changes the story with his funny and warm personality. He meets Bo-tong when she starts to sell her belongings to earn money and immediately gets attracted to her innocent charm.

- Han Chae-young as Hong Yoo-ra

The glamorous, successful woman Ma-te wants but can't get. She makes a game of "training" him and tells Ma-te to seduce ten of the most eligible bachelorettes in the city first. She has had a difficult life filled with torture as she can not see her own child nor talk to her husband from the harsh rule of the wife of the chairman.

=== Supporting ===
- Kim Bo-yeon as Na Hong-ran
- Dokgo Young-jae as Park Ki-suk
- Kim Young-jae as Park Moon-soo
- So Yoo-jin as Jaek-hee
- Kim Ye-won as Electric Fairy
- Cha Hyun-jung as Kim In-joong
- Park Ji-yoon as Myo-mi
- Kim Bo-ra as Kwi-ji
- Jung Sun-kyung as Yi-kim
- Kim Min-joo as Yeo-mim
- Yang Mi-kyung as Kim Mi-sook, Ma-te's mother
- Kim Ji-han as Jang Deok-saeng
- Lee Mi-young as Lee Mal-ja, Bo-tong's mother
- Yeo Hoon-min as Kim Dae-shik, Bo-tong's younger brother
- Ahn Byung-kyung as Na Jin-seok
- Lee Do-yup as Na Hwan-kyu
- Kim Seul-gi as Ma-te's high school teacher in senior year (cameo, Ep. 1)
- Jo Hye-ryun as female police officer (cameo, Ep. 1)
- Go Myung-hwan as MG Home Shopping organization director (cameo, Ep. 5)

== Original soundtrack ==
Bel Ami (Original Television Soundtrack)

Soundtrack album by Various Artists
- Genres: Pop, K-pop, soundtrack, R&B, teen pop
- Labels: Group 8 CJ E&M Music

Part 1:
No.	Title	Artist	Length
1.	"Pretty Man (예쁜남자)"	Bebop	3:40
2.	"Lovely Girl"	5live	3:24

Part 2:
No.	Title	Artist	Length
1.	"I Have a Person That I Love (사랑하는 사람 있어요)"	Melody Day	4:29
2.	"Poor Sense of Direction (길치)"	Lunafly	3:55

Part 3:
No.	Title	Artist	Length
1.	"Fever (열병)"	Hwanhee	4:12
2.	"Perfect"	Dear Cloud	3:57

Part 4:
No.	Title	Artist	Length
1.	"Going to You"	LEDApple	3:51
2.	"Saying I Love You (사랑한단 말야)"	Lee Jang-woo	3:42

Part 5:
No.	Title	Artist	Length
1.	"Pastel Crayon (크레파스)"	IU	3:15
2.	"I'm Nobody (하루만)"	Jung Joon-young	4:54

Part 6:
No.	Title	Artist	Length
1.	"Beautiful Day"	Jang Keun-suk	3:45

== Ratings ==
In the table below, the blue numbers represent the lowest ratings and the red numbers represent the highest ratings.

Episode #	Original broadcast date	Average audience share			
Episode #	Original broadcast date	TNmS Ratings		AGB Nielsen	
Episode #	Original broadcast date	Nationwide	Seoul National Capital Area	Nationwide	Seoul National Capital Area
1	2013/11/20	4.3%	5.0%	6.3%	7.0%
2	2013/11/21	4.8%	5.5%	6.1%	6.9%
3	2013/11/27	4.5%	4.9%	5.4%	5.5%
4	2013/11/28	3.7%	3.8%	4.3%	4.8%
5	2013/12/04	2.9%	3.0%	5.2%	5.8%
6	2013/12/05	3.2%	3.7%	3.8%	4.7%
7	2013/12/11	2.8%	3.0%	2.9%	3.0%
8	2013/12/12	2.8%	3.0%	3.1%	3.2%
9	2013/12/18	3.0%	3.9%	3.5%	4.1%
10	2013/12/19	2.8%	2.9%	3.5%	3.9%
11	2013/12/25	3.2%	3.6%	4.8%	5.1%
12	2013/12/26	2.6%	3.2%	4.3%	4.5%
13	2014/01/01	4.0%	4.5%	4.4%	4.6%
14	2014/01/02	3.0%	3.8%	3.9%	4.3%
15	2014/01/08	3.0%	3.6%	4.0%	4.9%
16	2014/01/09	2.3%	3.3%	3.8%	4.2%
Average		3.3%	3.9%	4.33%	4.78%

== Awards and nominations ==
Year	Award	Category	Recipient	Result
2013	KBS Drama Awards	Excellence Award, Actor in a Miniseries	Jang Keun-suk	Nominated
2013	KBS Drama Awards	Best New Actress	IU	Won
2013	KBS Drama Awards	Best Couple Award	Jang Keun-suk and IU	Nominated
2014	2nd DramaFever Awards	Best Kiss	Jang Keun-suk and IU	Nominated
2014	9th Seoul International Drama Awards	Outstanding Korean Drama	Pretty Man	Nominated
2014	9th Seoul International Drama Awards	Outstanding Korean Actress	IU	Nominated
2014	9th Seoul International Drama Awards	Outstanding Korean Drama OST	"Fever" - Hwanhee	Nominated
2014	9th Seoul International Drama Awards	Outstanding Korean Drama OST	"I'm Nobody" - Jung Joon-young	Nominated
2014	16th Seoul International Youth Film Festival	Best Young Actress	IU	Nominated
