= Chon Kye-young =

South Korean web comic author

- Born: December 10, 1970 (age 55); South Korea
- Occupation: Manhwa artist
- Years active: 1996–present

Korean name
- Hangul: 천계영
- RR: Cheon Gyeyeong
- MR: Ch'ŏn Kyeyŏng

Chon Kye-young (born December 10, 1970) is a South Korean manhwa author. One of Korea's most popular graphic novelists since her debut in 1996, her major works include Unplugged Boy (1997), Audition (1998), Girl in Heels (2007–2010) and Beautiful Man. Her recent series Love Alarm (2014–present), considered the biggest hit since her debut, is being adapted into a television series of the same name.

== Works ==
- Unplugged Boy (1997)
- Audition (1998)
- DVD (2003–2005)
- Girl in Heels (하이힐을 신은 소녀, 2007–2010)
- Beautiful Man
- Love Alarm (좋아하면 울리는, 2014–present)

== Screen adaptations ==
- Audition (animated film, 2009)
- Bel Ami (TV series, 2013–2014)
- Love Alarm (TV series, 2019)
