= The Odd Family: Zombie on Sale =

The Odd Family: Zombie On Sale
- Theatrical release poster
- Hangul: 기묘한 가족
- Lit.: Strange Family
- RR: Gimyohan gajok
- MR: Kimyohan kajok
- Directed by: Lee Min-jae
- Written by: Lee Min-jae; Jung Seo-in
- Produced by: Jang Jin-seung; Eum Zoo-young
- Starring: Jung Jae-young; Kim Nam-gil; Uhm Ji-won; Lee Soo-kyung; Jung Ga-ram; Park In-hwan
- Cinematography: Cho Hyoung-rae
- Edited by: Kim Sun-min
- Music by: Hwang Sang-jun
- Production companies: Cinezoo; Oscar 10 Studio
- Distributed by: Megabox Plus M
- Release date: February 13, 2019
- Running time: 111 minutes
- Country: South Korea
- Language: Korean

The Odd Family: Zombie On Sale (Korean: 기묘한 가족, also known in English as Zombie for Sale) is a 2019 South Korean zombie comedy film directed by Lee Min-jae, starring Jung Jae-young, Kim Nam-gil, Uhm Ji-won, Lee Soo-kyung, Jung Ga-ram and Park In-hwan.

== Plot ==
The story revolves around the Park family whose lives get disrupted after the elderly father gets bitten by a zombie.

The film begins when an unidentified zombie emerges from a sewer and wanders into a rural village. While fleeing from a dog, the zombie bites an elderly villager, before suffering a series of further indignities — being chased again, then struck by a car — until it is eventually captured by a local family. The family initially regards the zombie with pity, unaware that he is infected. However, one of the family members, Park Min-geol, analyzes the zombie's behavior online and concludes that he is undead. Min-geol argues that the zombie must be killed — and that his father, Park Man-deok, who has been bitten, must be killed as well. The family fractures over whether they could bring themselves to kill their own father. Meanwhile, Man-deok, locked inside a camper van, sweats and writhes in discomfort — but to everyone's surprise, begins experiencing unexpected physical improvements: increased strength and visibly younger-looking skin.

Word of Man-deok's rejuvenation spreads among the village elders, who learn the zombie's secret and convince Man-deok to launch a "rejuvenation business." The venture proves wildly successful, but once enough money has been made, Man-deok absconds with the earnings to Hawaii. With the family demoralized by his absence, rumors of the zombie's rejuvenating effects begin attracting younger villagers as well, all eager to be bitten. Min-geol takes over his father's business. The family gives the zombie a nickname, "Jjongbi," and tames him by feeding him cabbage, which resembles a brain. The youngest daughter, Park Hae-geol, grows close to Jjongbi and develops an affection for him.

However, as the incubation period ends, the infected villagers begin turning into zombies, and the village descends into chaos.

== Cast ==
- Jung Jae-young as Joon-gul
- Kim Nam-gil as Min-gul
- Uhm Ji-won as Nam-joo
- Lee Soo-kyung as Hae-gul
- Jung Ga-ram as Jjong-bi
- Park In-hwan as Man-deok
- Shin Jung-geun as Chief Oh
- Oh Eui-shik as Constable Choi
- Jeon Bae-soo as Constable Park
- Kim Ki-cheon as Elderly man
- Goo Bon-woong as Choon-sam

== Production ==
Principal photography began on October 13, 2017, and wrapped on January 21, 2018.

== Reception ==
On Rotten Tomatoes the film has an approval rating of 89% based on reviews from 28 critics, and an average rating of 7.2/10. The site's critical consensus reads, "An auspicious feature debut for director Lee Min-jae, Zombie for Sale puts a light yet surprisingly poignant spin on predictable genre formula."
