= Jung Ga-ram =

South Korean actor

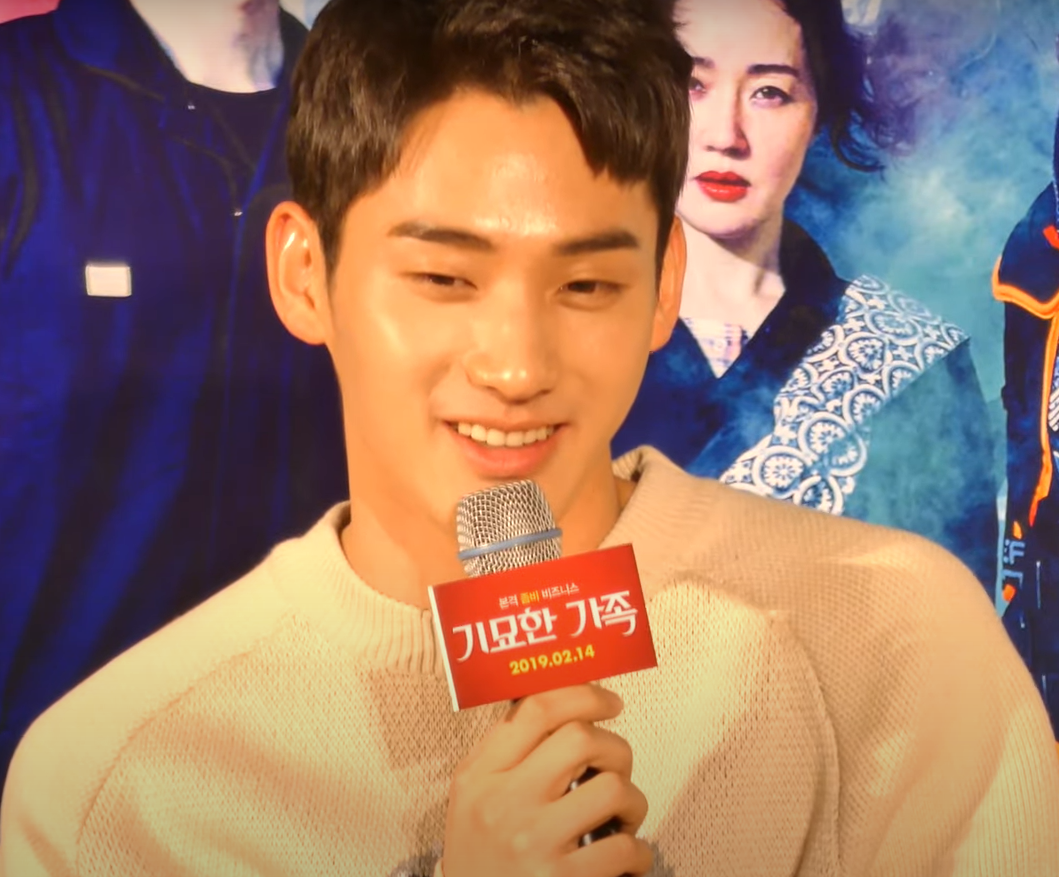
- Jung in 2019
- Born: February 23, 1993 (age 33); Miryang, South Gyeongsang Province, South Korea
- Education: Hanyang University
- Occupation: Actor
- Years active: 2011–present
- Agent: Management SOOP

Korean name
- Hangul: 정가람
- RR: Jeong Garam
- MR: Chŏng Karam

Jung Ga-ram (Korean: 정가람; born February 23, 1993) is a South Korean actor. He rose to prominence for his roles in the films 4th Place (2016) and The Poet and the Boy (2017). He is also known for his roles in television series such as Standby (2012), Mistress (2018), When the Camellia Blooms (2019), and Love Alarm (2019).

== Career ==
In 2025, Jung starred in Netflix's mystery historical television series Dear Hongrang alongside Jo Bo-ah and Lee Jae-wook. It is based on Tangeum: Swallowing Gold by Jang Da-hye and was produced by Studio Dragon.

== Personal life ==
Jung enlisted mandatory military service on October 12, 2020. He was discharged from military service on April 11, 2022.

== Filmography ==
=== Film ===
Year	Title	Role	Ref.
2016	4th Place	young Kwang-soo	
2017	The Poet and the Boy	Se-yun	
2018	Believer	Dong-woo	
2019	Jo Pil-ho: The Dawning Rage	Han Ki-chul	
2019	The Odd Family: Zombie On Sale	Jjong-bi	
2020	Beasts Clawing at Straws	Jin-tae	
2026	The Ultimate Duo	Joong-ho	

=== Television series ===
Year	Title	Role	Notes	Ref.
2011	High Kick: Revenge of the Short Legged	—N/a	Bit part	
2012	Standby	Jung Ga-ram	Bit part	
2013	The Heirs	Student	Bit part	
2015	Heard It Through the Grapevine	Sung Min-jae		
2017	Frozen Love	Jang Cha-da	one-act drama	
2018	Mistress	Sun-ho		
2019	When the Camellia Blooms	adult Pil-goo	Cameo (Ep. 18, 20, 36, 40)	
2019–2021	Love Alarm	Lee Hye-young	Season 1–2	
2022–2023	The Interest of Love	Jeong Jong-hyun		
2025	Dear Hongrang	Mu-jin		

== Awards and nominations ==
Name of the award ceremony, year presented, category, nominee of the award, and the result of the nomination
Award ceremony	Year	Category	Nominee / Work	Result	Ref.
Chunsa Film Art Awards	2018	Best New Actor	The Poet and the Boy	Nominated	
Grand Bell Awards	2016	Best New Actor	4th Place	Won	
Grand Bell Awards	2018	Best New Actor	The Poet and the Boy	Nominated	
KOFRA Film Awards	2017	Best New Actor	4th Place	Won	
Wildflower Film Awards	2018	Best New Actor	The Poet and the Boy	Nominated	
