= Love X Stereo =

South Korean electro duo

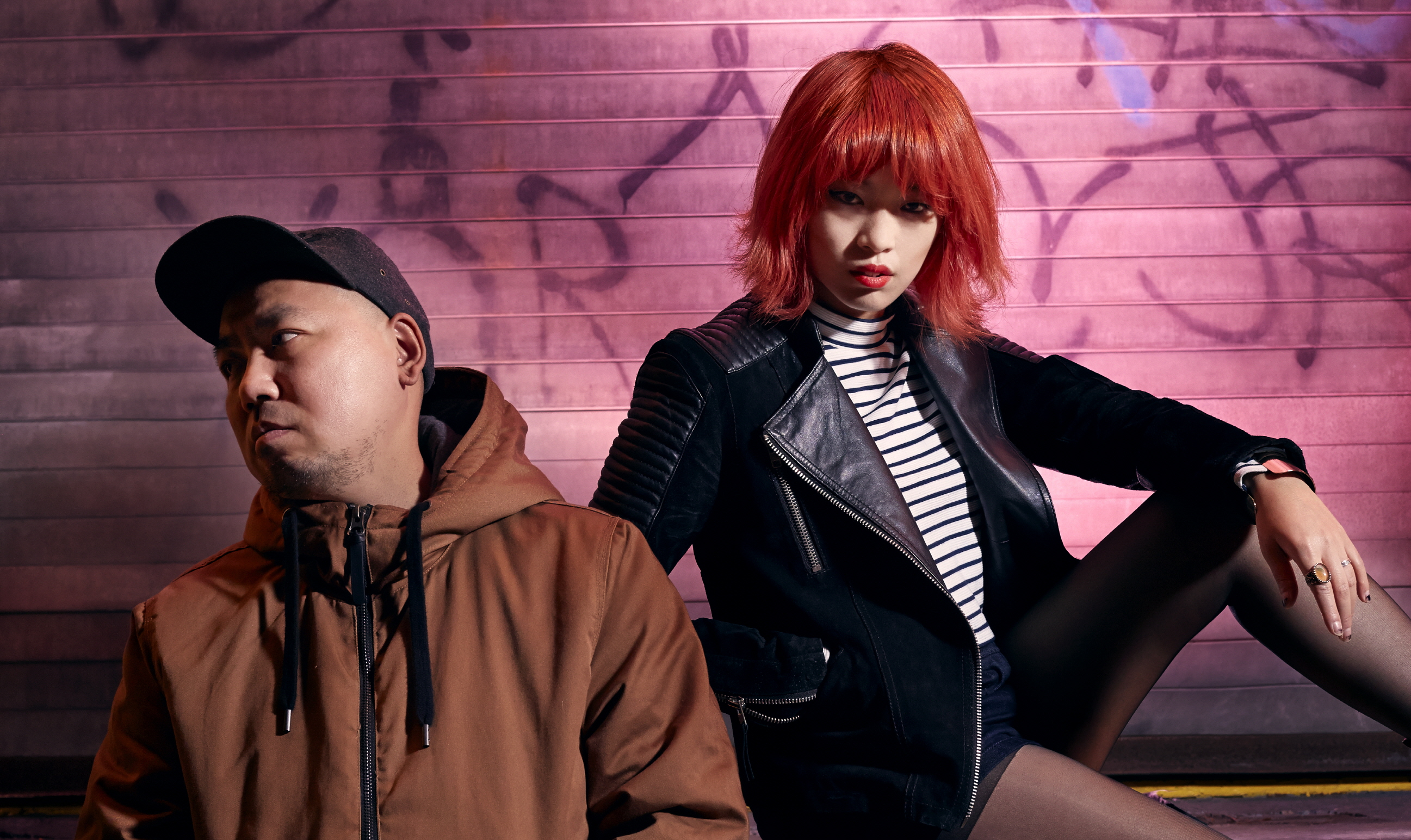

Background information
- Origin: Seoul, South Korea
- Genres: Electro, electronic rock, alternative, synth-pop, electropunk
- Years active: 2011–present
- Members: Annie Ko; Toby Hwang
- Website: lovexstereo.com

Love X Stereo (Korean: 러브엑스테레오) is an electro duo from Seoul, Korea. Consisting lead vocalist and synthesizer player Annie Ko and guitarist and producer Toby Hwang, the duo debuted in 2011 by releasing an EP album called Buzzin'.

== Band members ==
- Annie Ko: lead vocals, synthesizers
- Toby Hwang: producer, guitar, bass, synthesizers

== History ==
=== 1998-2011: 18Cruk and Skrew Attack ===
In 1998, Toby Hwang, then-bassist for Korean punk rock band 18Cruk, decided to quit to from a new 3-piece band, Skrew Attack. Inspired by the faster-paced sounds of bands like NOFX, Black Flag, Bad Religion, and Minor Threat, Hwang cycled through numerous lineup changes with Skrew Attack before meeting vocalist Annie Ko in the Hongdae neighborhood in 2005. Ko had attended Ewha Womans University and Seoul National University (studying physics and astronomy, respectively), before pursuing a career as a singer. Hwang and Ko remained core members of Skrew Attack until 2011.

=== 2011-present: Name change and Love X Stereo ===
Driven by a desire to branch out from their punk rock beginnings, Hwang and Ko decided to change the band's name to Love X Stereo, a name derived from Hwang's record label Stereo City Records. In a 2013 interview with Schoolkids Records' BLURT Magazine, Hwang states:

We did punk rock for years and years, so this time we wanted to do something different, something that isn’t necessarily punk rock, and something fresh and new. We love to add experimental flavor into our music, adding different elements from different genres that we like, such as trip hop, electro, alternative rock etc. So, changing band name was quite inevitable.

Love X Stereo released their debut EP, Buzzin' on December 28, 2011, incorporating elements of electronic music not previously featured in Skrew Attack's music. Subsequent releases have continued to feature heavy use of synthesizers and drum machines, further developing their electro-rock sound.

== Discography ==
=== LP ===
Year	Album	Track listing
2017	37A: Released: May 13, 2017	1. Maybe I 2. Dark and Light; 3. Lemon Spark; 4. Bring Me Back to You; 5. Battle Wings; 6. 백색소음 White Noise; 7. Paradise Lost; 8. Parallel Universe; 9. Like a Waterfall in the Sky; 10. Rage Is Not Enough (Danja Mix) [Remastered]
2017	37B: Released: Nov 30, 2017	1. Nosedive; 2. A Revolution; 3. Le Grand Bleu; 4. Instalove; 5. Turn It Up; 6. Thunder Kiss; 7. Trendkill; 8. Pulse; 9. Deeper Than the Dark; 10. Slipping Away
2019	37X: Released: Oct 18, 2019	1. Turn It Up (Art Effects Remix); 2. Deeper Than the Dark (Retro Remix); 3. All Over Again (Urban Remix); 4. Hide and Seek (Dance Hall Remix); 5. Fly Over (Open Ocean Remix); 6. Dead Beat Generation (Hard Time Remix); 7. Le Grand Bleu (Clockwork Remix); 8. We Love We Leave (Techno Remix); 9. Parallel Universe (Rabbit Hole Remix); 10. Zero One (Ultra Bleu Remix)
2019	37C: Released: Nov 22, 2019	1. Annihilation; 2. Free Fall; 3. Imagining You (feat. I Made Subandi); 4. Head On the Ground; 5. Christmas Sunset; 6. All Over Again; 7. 찰나 Ksana; 8. Zero One; 9. 불러줘 내 이름 Call My Name; 10. Slipping Away (Acoustic Version)
2021	Xennials: Released: Jan 20, 2021	1. Sixteen; 2. Wondrous; 3. Push the Play; 4. Rebel Dress; 5. Kid From the Future; 6. Cell Theory (feat. KIMOXAVI); 7. VS (feat. Naehyun Kim)

=== EP ===
Year	Album	Track listing
2011	Buzzin’: Released: December 28, 2011	1. High Road; 2. Free Ass; 3. Ocean Breeze; 4. Ocean Breeze (Korean Version)
2012	Off the Grid: Released: November 21, 2012	1. Soul City (Seoul City); 2. Chain Reaction; 3. Storm
2013	Glow: Released: September 26, 2013	1. Lose to Win; 2. Fly Over; 3. Secrets; 4. Crossing Rivers; 5. Soul City (John Gaska Remix); 6. Soul City (J-Path Remix); 7. Chain Reaction (J-Path Remix)
2015	We Love We Leave, Part 1: Released: February 10, 2015	1. We Love We Leave; 2. Chain Reaction (Deluxe Edition); 3. Ocean Breeze (Deluxe Edition); 4. My Anywhere; 5. Fly Over (Deluxe Edition); 6. Free Ass (Deluxe Edition); 7. Soul City (Seoul City) [Deluxe Edition]
2016	We Love We Leave, Part 2: Released: April 29, 2016	1. Dead Beat Generation; 2. Beauties Die Young; 3. Love Is On The Way; 4. New World; 5. Hide and Seek
2023	Love X Stereo vs DA1SY DØØM - / 안녕 ÄNɎƏŊ /: Released: Jun 10, 2023	1. < 랑데뷰 RDV >; 2. < 자각몽 Lucid / Dreams >; 3. < 끌어당김 @traction >; 4. < 미라클시티 Miracle_City >; 5 .< 바이너리 Βynari >

=== V/A ===
Year	Album	Track listing
2013	Bu-Kkeu-Reo-Wo-Yo: Released: July 25, 2013	1. Bu-Kkeu-Reo-Wo-Yo; 2. Bu-Kkeu-Reo-Wo-Yo (J-Path KTB Remix)
2014	Indie Goes Pop: Released: August 4, 2014 by Cleopatra Records	8. Safe and Sound (Capital Cities Cover)
2015	Hide and Seek: Released: October 9, 2015	1. Hide and Seek (Single Version); 2. Hide and Seek (J-Path 88 Remix)
2016	Cheese In The Trap OST Part 8: Released: March 1, 2016 by CJ E&M	2. Hide and Seek (OST Version)
2016	Rage Is Not Enough (Danja Mix): Released: August 19, 2016	1. Rage Is Not Enough (Danja Mix)
2018	Winter Dreams: Released: February 6, 2018, released by Various Artists	4. 찰나 Ksana
2019	Zero One: Released: February 15, 2019	1. Zero One; 2. Zero One (Ultra Bleu Remix)
2019	Love Alarm 좋아하면 울리는 (Original Soundtrack): Released: September 6, 2019	2. Tearliner - In My Dreams (Feat. Love X Stereo); 7. Tearliner - In My Dreams (Acoustic Ver.) (Feat. Love X Stereo)
2019	Imagining You: Released: September 20, 2019	1. Love X Stereo - Imagining You (feat. I Made Subandi)
2022	All3: Released: January 14, 2022	1. All3; 2. All3 (J-Path Midnight Cruise Remix); 3. All3 (Instrumental); 4. All3 (J-Path Midnight Cruise Remix)[Instrumental]
2023	Summer Strike 아무것도 하고 싶지 않아 (Original Soundtrack): Released: January 2, 2023	8. Tearliner - Me, the Protagonist (Feat. Love X Stereo)
2023	Love X Stereo vs DA1SY DØØM - < 자각몽 Lucid / Dreams >: Released: May 20, 2023	1. < 자각몽 Lucid / Dreams >
2023	Love X Stereo vs DA1SY DØØM - < 끌어당김 @traction >: Released: May 20, 2023	1. < 끌어당김 @traction >
2023	Love X Stereo vs DA1SY DØØM - < 미라클시티 Miracle_City >: Released: Jun 3, 2023	1. < 미라클시티 Miracle_City >
2024	Future Unknown: Released: February 21, 2014	1. Future Unknown; 2. Future Unknown (Instrumental)

== International Festivals ==
- Music Matters Live 2023 (Singapore)
- Mu:Con 2023 (Seoul)
- KOBA 2023 (Seoul)
- NAMM Believe in Music Week 2021 (Global Streaming)
- Mu:Con 2020 (Seoul)
- Ubud Food Festival 2019 (Bali)
- Reeperbahn 2018 (Hamburg)
- APaMM (Asia Pacific Music Meeting) 2018 (Ulsan)
- Baybeats 2018 (Singapore)
- FOCUS Wales 2017 (Wrexham)
- Pentaport Rock Festival 2016 (Incheon)
- KCON (music festival) 2016 (Los Angeles)
- South by Southwest 2016 (Austin)
- Vans New Wave Musicfest 2015 (Bangalore)
- Mu:Con 2015 (Seoul)
- Zandari Festa 2015 (Seoul)
- Canadian Music Week 2015 (Toronto)
- CMJ Music Marathon 2014 (New York City)
- Culture Collide 2014 (Los Angeles, San Francisco)
- Hyundai Card CityBreak 2014 (Seoul)
- Ultra Music Festival 2014 (Seoul)
- Music Matters Live 2014 (Singapore)
- South by Southwest 2014 (Austin)
- CMJ Music Marathon 2013 (New York City)
- Indie Week Canada 2013 (Toronto)
- Zandari Festa 2012 (Seoul)
- Jisan Valley Rock Festival 2012 (Icheon)

== Awards ==
- 2018 Best Music Video: Rage Is Not Enough (Canada International Film Festival)
- 2017 Best Music Video: Nominee (Girona Film Festival)
- 2017 Best Dance & Electronic Album of the Year: Nominee (Korean Music Awards)
- K-Rookies 2014 Annual Finals: Runner-Up (Korea Creative Content Agency)
