= Distorted (TV series) =

South Korean television series

- Promotional poster
- Hangul: 조작
- Hanja: 造作
- Lit.: Falsify
- RR: Jojak
- MR: Chojak
- Genre: Legal thriller; Political; Drama
- Written by: Kim Hyun-jung
- Directed by: Lee Jung-heum
- Creative directors: Park Bo-ram; Kim Ji-yeon
- Starring: Namkoong Min; Uhm Ji-won; Yoo Jun-sang; Jeon Hye-bin; Moon Sung-keun
- Country of origin: South Korea
- Original language: Korean
- No. of episodes: 32

Production
- Producer: Park Hyung-ki
- Camera setup: Single-camera
- Running time: 35 minutes
- Production company: The Story Works (SBS)

Original release
- Network: SBS TV
- Release: July 24 – September 12, 2017

Distorted (Korean: 조작; RR: Jojak; lit. 'Falsify') is a South Korean television series starring Namkoong Min, Uhm Ji-won, Yoo Jun-sang, Jeon Hye-bin and Moon Sung-keun. It aired on SBS from July 24 to September 12, 2017 on Mondays and Tuesdays at 22:00 (KST) for 32 episodes.

== Synopsis ==
Reporters and ex-Judo athlete Han Moo Young (Namkoong Min) and Lee Seok Min (Yoo Jun-sang), and Prosecutor Kwon Sora (Uhm Ji-won) struggle to unveil the truth that was falsified.

== Cast ==
=== Main ===
- Namkoong Min as Han Moo-young

A disgraced ex-Judo athlete who witnesses his brother, a reporter, die while trying to report on a big corruption scandal. To avenge his brother's death, he becomes a reporter himself.

- Uhm Ji-won as Kwon So-ra

A prosecutor who graduated at the top of her class and became well known for becoming the youngest ever female rookie.

- Yoo Jun-sang as Lee Seok-min

A journalist who is cynical and stubborn, he is a prickly person who's a sceptic with a lot of injustice to vent.

- Jeon Hye-bin as Oh Yoo-kyung

A reporter from the Splash Team who has a long working history with Lee Seok-min.

- Moon Sung-keun as Koo Tae-won

Director of Daehan Newspaper.

=== Supporting ===
==== Aeguk Newspaper ====
- Jo Hee-bong as Yang Dong-sik
- Kim Kang-hyun as Lee Yong-sik
- Park Kyung-hye as Seo Na-rae
- Ahn Ji-hoon as Yang Sang-ho

==== Splash Team ====
- Park Sung-hoon as Na Sung-shik
- Oh Ah-yeon as Gong Ji-won

==== Prosecution ====
- Park Ji-young as Cha Yeon-soo
- Jung Hee-tae as Park Jin-woo
- Park Won-sang as Im Ji-tae

=== Extended ===
- Choi Gwi-hwa as Yang Choo-sung
- Kim Gi-nam as Lee Byung-kwan
- Ryu Seung-soo as Jo Young-gi
- Kim Min-sang as Jung Hae-dong
- Jung Man-sik as Jun Chan-soo
- Park Jung-hak as Park Eung-mo
- Lee Joo-seung as Yoon Seon-woo
- Bae Hae-sun as Choi Su-yeon
- Kim Hye-seong as Song Tae-joon
- Kang Shin-hyo as Moon Shin-nam
- Park Sang-Hui
- Ha Kyung-min
- Seo Bo-ik
- Seo Ho-chul
- Ji Sung-hwan
- Yoo Jae-hoon
- Kim Jong-ho
- Kim Kyung-min
- Jo Jung-moon
- Choi Young
- Kim Myung-sun
- Yoon Hee-won
- Choi Jae-young
- Kim Yoon-sang
- Yoon Seo-young
- Kang Deuk-jong

=== Special appearances ===
- Oh Jung-se as Han Chul-ho

Han Moo-young's brother who died for whistleblowing an article on a big corruption scandal.

- Kim Jong-soo
- Jo Young-jin
- Lee Sang-hong
- Cha Soon-bae as Kim Sun-hong
- Yoo Ha-bok
- Kim Hyung-mook
- Jung Ok
- Park Hoon as an informant
- Joo Suk-tae as a lawyer (Ep. 7)

== Production ==
Filming began in early May without the female lead. First script reading with the entire cast took place in June and filming commenced straight after.

== Reception ==
Despite premiering later than its competitors by one week, the series topped ratings for its time slot. It received attention for revealing cases that remind viewers of the infamous "Sung Wan-jong List," one of the biggest political corruption scandals during the former Park Geun-hye administration, and swimmer Park Tae-hwan's doping test scandal.

== Original soundtrack ==
Distorted OST

Soundtrack album by Various artists
- Released: 2017
- Genre: Soundtrack
- Language: Korean
- Labels: Blending Co., Ltd.; SBS Content Hub Co., Ltd

=== Part 1 ===
Release date August 1, 2017
No.	Title	Artist	Length
1.	"Where Are You" (어디있나요)	Suran	03:25
2.	"Where Are You" (Inst.)		03:25
Total length:			06:50

== Ratings ==
- In the table below, the blue numbers represent the lowest ratings and the red numbers represent the highest ratings.

Ep.	Date	Average audience share			
Ep.	Date	TNmS Ratings		AGB Nielsen	
Ep.	Date	Nationwide	Seoul	Nationwide	Seoul
1	July 24, 2017	9.3% (18th)	12.3% (5th)	11.6% (6th)	13.5% (5th)
2	July 24, 2017	9.6% (16th)	12.4% (4th)	12.6% (4th)	14.6% (4th)
3	July 25, 2017	8.7% (12th)	11.4% (5th)	10.4% (6th)	11.7% (5th)
4	July 25, 2017	10.5% (7th)	13.3% (4th)	12.5% (4th)	13.8% (4th)
5	July 31, 2017	9.1% (14th)	10.8% (5th)	11.3% (5th)	12.3% (5th)
6	July 31, 2017	9.8% (13th)	11.6% (4th)	12.0% (4th)	13.3% (4th)
7	August 1, 2017	8.3% (15th)	10.6% (5th)	9.5% (7th)	10.6% (5th)
8	August 1, 2017	10.2% (10th)	12.7% (4th)	12.1% (4th)	13.3% (4th)
9	August 7, 2017	9.0% (15th)	11.7% (5th)	10.3% (8th)	11.1% (5th)
10	August 7, 2017	9.7% (14th)	12.7% (4th)	11.8% (4th)	12.8% (4th)
11	August 8, 2017	8.7% (12th)	11.2% (6th)	10.1% (6th)	11.4% (5th)
12	August 8, 2017	10.2% (9th)	12.7% (4th)	11.4% (4th)	13.0% (4th)
13	August 14, 2017	7.6% (19th)	8.6% (10th)	9.9% (9th)	11.1% (6th)
14	August 14, 2017	8.4% (15th)	9.5% (7th)	11.4% (4th)	12.6% (4th)
15	August 15, 2017	7.9% (15th)	8.8% (6th)	10.6% (6th)	11.8% (5th)
16	August 15, 2017	9.1% (8th)	10.5% (4th)	12.2% (4th)	13.8% (4th)
17	August 21, 2017	8.0% (17th)	9.6% (6th)	9.7% (11th)	10.7% (7th)
18	August 21, 2017	9.2% (14th)	11.2% (4th)	11.2% (6th)	12.5% (4th)
19	August 22, 2017	9.3% (11th)	11.2% (5th)	10.2% (7th)	11.4% (5th)
20	August 22, 2017	10.6% (8th)	13.1% (3rd)	11.6% (4th)	12.5% (4th)
21	August 28, 2017	8.7% (16th)	9.7% (10th)	9.6% (10th)	10.5% (7th)
22	August 28, 2017	9.6% (13th)	11.2% (4th)	10.9% (6th)	11.9% (5th)
23	August 29, 2017	8.0% (16th)	9.6% (8th)	9.9% (9th)	11.0% (5th)
24	August 29, 2017	9.0% (13th)	10.5% (5th)	11.6% (4th)	13.0% (4th)
25	September 4, 2017	8.6% (16th)	10.6% (5th)	10.0% (8th)	10.6% (6th)
26	September 4, 2017	9.2% (13th)	10.7% (4th)	11.6% (4th)	12.2% (4th)
27	September 5, 2017	7.5% (15th)	9.1% (6th)	10.3% (5th)	11.3% (5th)
28	September 5, 2017	8.7% (11th)	10.3% (4th)	12.2% (4th)	13.3% (4th)
29	September 11, 2017	9.1% (15th)	10.6% (9th)	10.3% (10th)	11.2% (5th)
30	September 11, 2017	10.4% (13th)	11.9% (4th)	12.4% (5th)	13.4% (4th)
31	September 12, 2017	11.0% (10th)	12.7% (4th)	11.0% (6th)	11.6% (5th)
32	September 12, 2017	11.8% (8th)	13.1% (3rd)	12.4% (4th)	13.0% (4th)
Average		9.22%	11.13%	11.08%	12.23%
