= Park Jung-geun =

South Korean photographer

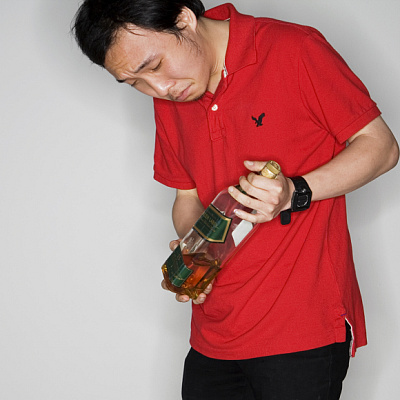
- Park Jung-geun in 2012
- Born: March 18, 1988 (age 38); Seongbuk District, Seoul, South Korea
- Occupations: Indie musician, photographer
- Organization(s): Bissantrophy Records (2005–); Jarip Musician Union (2010–)
- Political party: labor Party (2013–); New Progressive Party (2013); Socialist Party (2010–2013)
- Awards: Face of the Year Award (2012)

Korean name
- Hangul: 박정근
- Hanja: 朴正根
- RR: Bak Jeonggeun
- MR: Pak Chŏnggŭn

Park Jung-geun (Korean pronunciation: [pak t͈ɕʌŋɡɯn]) is a South Korean photographer. He received a suspended 10-month prison term for violating South Korean National Security Law by resending North Korean tweets.

He claimed that the Twitter posts he made that were used to convict him were sarcastic, and that the case built against him selected only certain tweets that made him look bad. Others have called his tweets satire.

He was eventually acquitted.

Amnesty International criticised his arrest and pointed out that although he was a socialist, he was not a supporter of North Korea. Park also criticised the National Security Act, calling it "an old-fashioned draconian law that mentions DEATH EIGHT TIMES".

Park has been connected with various activist causes, such as the eviction protest at Duriban restaurant in Hongdae, an evictee protest in Poi-dong, a "Halve College Tuition" protest, a strike by cleaners at Hongik University, and participated in an illegal protest against layoffs at Hanjin Heavy Industries.

He is also a notable figure from the Korean punk scene, having run the label Bissantrophy which was active from 2005 to 2014. His label was affiliated with Bamseom Pirates and he appeared in the documentary Bamseom Pirates Seoul Inferno. His photo studio in Chungmuro was also used as a live music venue for several years, known colloquially as Jarip HQ.

In 2012, 10 music groups in South Korea created the punk performance piece "North Korean Punk Rocker Rhee Sung-wung, "telling the life story of a fictional North Korean punk, at Art Sonje Center, which was a thinly veiled criticism of South Korea's persecution of Park.
