= Dear Hongrang =

2025 South Korean television series

- Promotional poster
- Hangul: 탄금
- Lit.: Swallowing Gold
- RR: Tangeum
- MR: T'an'gŭm
- Genre: Mystery; Melodrama; Sageuk
- Based on: Tangeum: Swallowing Gold by Jang Da-hye
- Written by: Kim Jin-ah
- Directed by: Kim Hong-sun
- Starring: Lee Jae-wook; Jo Bo-ah; Jung Ga-ram; Uhm Ji-won; Park Byung-eun; Kim Jae-wook
- Music by: Kim Tae-seung
- Country of origin: South Korea
- Original language: Korean
- No. of episodes: 11

Production
- Running time: 60—70 minutes
- Production companies: Studio Dragon; Acemaker Movieworks; H House; EO Contents Group

Original release
- Network: Netflix
- Release: May 16, 2025

Dear Hongrang (Korean: 탄금) is a South Korean mystery melodrama sageuk television series written by Kim Jin-ah, directed by Kim Hong-sun, and starring Lee Jae-wook, Jo Bo-ah, Jung Ga-ram, Uhm Ji-won, Park Byung-eun, and Kim Jae-wook. Based on Tangeum: Swallowing Gold by Jang Da-hye, the series follows how Jae-yi searches and uncovers the truth behind Hong-rang's disappearance and the man claiming to be him. It premiered on Netflix on May 16, 2025.

== Synopsis ==
Hong-rang, the son of a wealthy merchant family in Joseon, went missing at the age of eight. His half-sister, Jae-yi, never gives up hope and searches for him tirelessly. Twelve years later, a young man appears claiming to be Hong-rang, but he has no memories of his past. While Jae-yi is skeptical, his mother desperately wants to believe him. However, this man carries a secret, and his reappearance brings intrigue and danger. Jae-yi's quest to uncover the truth behind Hong-rang's disappearance and the identity of this returning man leads her into a web of family secrets and power struggles.

== Cast and characters ==
=== Main ===
- Lee Jae-wook as Hong-rang

A mysteriously returned heir of a powerful Joseon clan, whose true identity and motives remain in secret.

- Jo Bo-ah as Jae-yi

The outcast daughter of a powerful Joseon clan who hides her pain as she searches for her long-lost half-brother.

- Jung Ga-ram as Mu-jin

A stand-in for the lost heir Hong-rang who was born into a fallen noble family.

- Uhm Ji-won as Min Yeon-ui

The matriarch of the clan who will stop at nothing to reclaim her lost son.

- Park Byung-eun as Shim Yeol-guk

The ruthless head of the clan and father of Hongrang and Jae-i, who makes cold, calculated choices in pursuit of his ambition.

- Kim Jae-wook as Prince Han Pyeong

The king's only brother, indifferent to politics and court affairs, yet deeply devoted to scholarship and art.

=== Supporting ===
- Park Myung-hoon as Bang Ji-ryeon

Shim Yeol-guk's subordinate.

- Jo Jae-yoon as Jo Bang-sook

The leader of the group searching for Mu-jin.

- Choi Young-woo as Yook Son

Min Yeon-ui's confidant.

- Choi Hyung-tae as Bu Yeong

Mu-jin's right-hand man.

- Park Ji-ah as Madam Gwigokja

A shaman.

- Kim Bada as Du Ryeong

Deputy leader of the sword guild.

- Kim Min-gi as In Hoe

Hong-rang's sworn brother.

- Lee Ga-ryeong as Kkot Nim

Leader of the sword guild.

== Episodes ==
No.	Title	Directed by	Written by	Original release date
1	"Rainbow Hong, Shining Rang - My Brother Hongrang"; Transliteration: "Mujigae hong, balgeul rang - nae au hongnang" (Korean: 무지개 홍, 밝을 랑 - 내 아우 홍랑)	Kim Hong-sun	Kim Jin-ah	May 16, 2025
2	"The One Who Stole Our World"; Transliteration: "Sesangeul asagan seorin" (Korean: 세상을 앗아간 설인)	Kim Hong-sun	Kim Jin-ah	May 16, 2025
3	"The Most Authentic Replica"; Transliteration: "Jinpum gateun gapum" (Korean: 진품 같은 가품)	Kim Hong-sun	Kim Jin-ah	May 16, 2025
4	"Our Reflective Scars"; Transliteration: "Geoulcheoreom bichineun sangheun" (Korean: 거울처럼 비치는 상흔)	Kim Hong-sun	Kim Jin-ah	May 16, 2025
5	"The Thicker the Veil, the Clearer the Heart"; Transliteration: "Garimsok seonmyeonghaejineun, nungarim" (Korean: 가림속 선명해지는, 눈가림)	Kim Hong-sun	Kim Jin-ah	May 16, 2025
6	"Nothing Mu, Finished Jin - Brother Mu-jin"; Transliteration: "Eopseul mu, dahal jin - orabeoni mujin" (Korean: 없을 무, 다할 진 - 오라버니 무진)	Kim Hong-sun	Kim Jin-ah	May 16, 2025
7	"Roaring Waves"; Transliteration: "Hwimorachineun padong" (Korean: 휘몰아치는 파동)	Kim Hong-sun	Kim Jin-ah	May 16, 2025
8	"Imperfect Jae, Departing Yi - My Name Is Jae-yi"; Transliteration: "Ijireojil jae, tteonal i - nae ireum jaei" (Korean: 이지러질 재, 떠날 이 - 내 이름 재이)	Kim Hong-sun	Kim Jin-ah	May 16, 2025
9	"The Living Offering"; Transliteration: "Sarainneun sopum" (Korean: 살아있는 소품)	Kim Hong-sun	Kim Jin-ah	May 16, 2025
10	"A Bittersweet Farewell"; Transliteration: "Dachi mothal insa" (Korean: 닿지 못할 인사)	Kim Hong-sun	Kim Jin-ah	May 16, 2025
11	"Forever and After"; Transliteration: "Yeongwontorok, yeongyeong" (Korean: 영원토록, 영영)	Kim Hong-sun	Kim Jin-ah	May 16, 2025

== Release ==
Initially, the series was reported to premiered on Netflix in early 2024. In February 2025, Netflix announced their 2025 Korean films and series lineup and the window date of Dear Hongrang will be in the second quarter of 2025. In April 2025, the series was confirmed to be released on May 16.

== Reception ==
On the review aggregator website Rotten Tomatoes, 80% of 5 critics' reviews are positive, with an average rating of 8/10.
