= Oh Seung-hoon (actor) =

South Korean actor and model

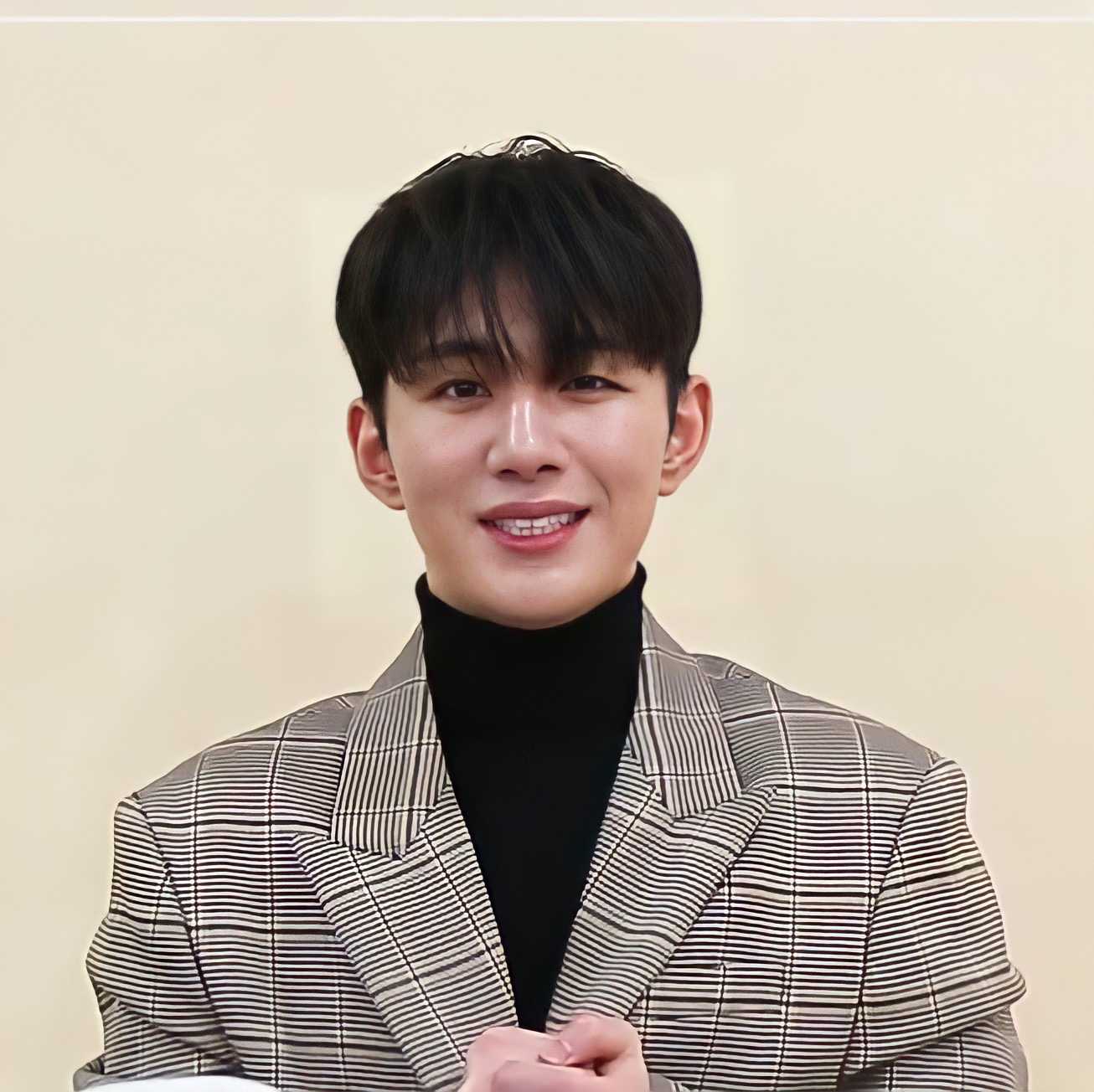
- Oh in 2021
- Born: 11 February 1991 (age 35); Seoul, South Korea
- Education: Kyung Hee University
- Occupations: Actor; Model
- Years active: 2013–present
- Agent: Just Entertainment

Korean name
- Hangul: 오승훈
- RR: O Seunghun
- MR: O Sŭnghun

Oh Seung-hoon (born 11 February 1991) is a South Korean actor and model. He gained attention and acclaim for his role in the film Method (2017). He was also known for portraying a hired killer of the main antagonist from 2017 TV series Innocent Defendant.

== Filmography ==
=== Film ===
Year	English title	Original title	Role	Notes/Ref.
2017	Method	메소드	Young-woo	
2018	Wretches	괴물들	Sang-cheol	
2020	Justice High	공수도	Jong-gu	
2023	Believer 2	독전2	Young-rak	Netflix film

=== Television series ===
Year	English title	Original title	Role
2017	Innocent Defendant	피고인	Kim-seok
2017	Oh, the Mysterious	의문의 일승	Gi Myeon-jung
2019	Item	아이템	Seo Yo-han
2020	KBS Drama Special: "Modern Girl"	드라마 스페셜 - 모단 걸	Jong-seok
2022	Through the Darkness	악의 마음을 읽는 자들	Jo Kang-moo
2022	Bloody Heart	붉은 단심	Hye-gang
2024	Uncle Samsik	삼식이 삼촌	Ahn Gi-cheol
2026	Sword & Silence	문무	Kim In-moon

== Awards and nominations ==
Year	Award	Category	Nominated work	Result
2018	23rd Chunsa Film Art Awards	Best New Actor	Method	Won
2018	5th Wildflower Film Awards	Best New Actor	Method	Won
2018	27th Buil Film Awards	Best New Actor	Method	Nominated
2018	55th Grand Bell Awards	Best New Actor	Method	Nominated
