= Uhm Ji-won =

South Korean actress (born 1977)

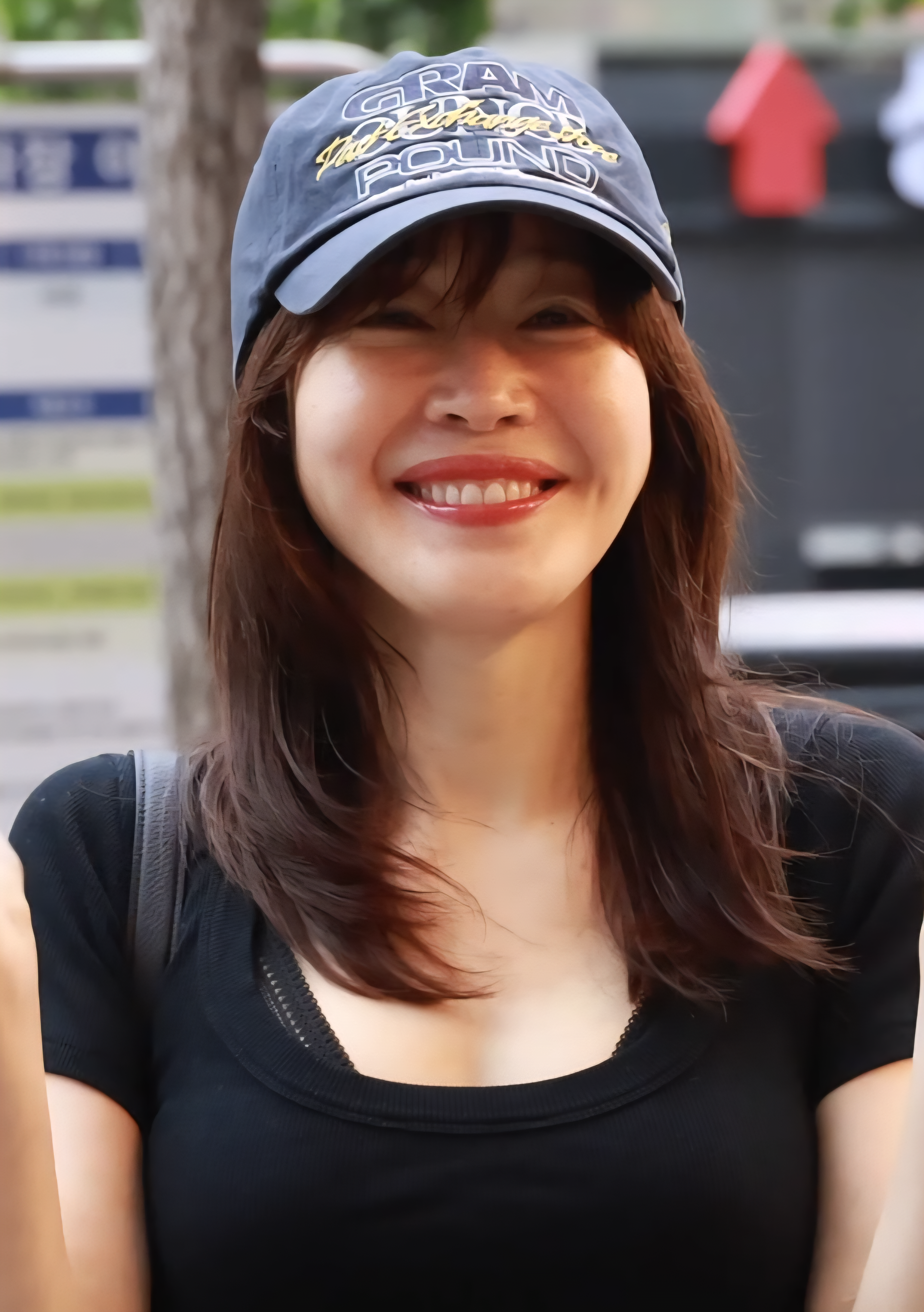
- Uhm in July 2025
- Born: December 25, 1977 (age 48); Daegu, South Korea
- Education: Kyungpook National University (Department of Geography)
- Occupation: Actress
- Years active: 1998–present
- Agent: C-JeS Studios
- Spouse: Oh Young-wook (m. 2014; div. 2021)

Korean name
- Hangul: 엄지원
- Hanja: 嚴志媛
- RR: Eom Jiwon
- MR: Ŏm Chiwŏn

Uhm Ji-won (Korean: 엄지원; born December 25, 1977) is a South Korean actress. She is best known for her leading roles in the films Tale of Cinema (2005), Hope (2013), The Silenced (2015), Missing (2016), and the television dramas Birthcare Center (2020), and Little Women (2022).

== Career ==
Uhm Ji-won made her acting debut in the late 1990s, and after an early role in the Korean tokusatsu series Vectorman, went on to appear in a number of films and television drama series. In 2004, she appeared alongside Han Suk-kyu and Lee Eun-ju in The Scarlet Letter, receiving a nomination for Best Supporting Actress at the Blue Dragon Film Awards.

In 2005, Uhm played a leading role in Hong Sang-soo's Tale of Cinema, and was praised for giving an "engaging, emotionally nuanced dual performance" as fictional actress Choi Young-shil. The film required her to perform her first nude scene, and she later remarked that, "After stripping in front of the camera, I felt that I could now take any role."

Uhm starred alongside Yoo Ji-tae and Kim Ji-soo in the 2006 film Traces of Love, portraying a survivor of the 1995 Sampoong Department Store collapse who still suffers from psychological trauma years later. She prepared for the role by studying news and documentaries of the event, as well as reading through various psychology texts. Uhm was once again nominated for Best Supporting Actress at the Blue Dragon Film Awards, and later won the same category at the Chunsa Film Art Awards.

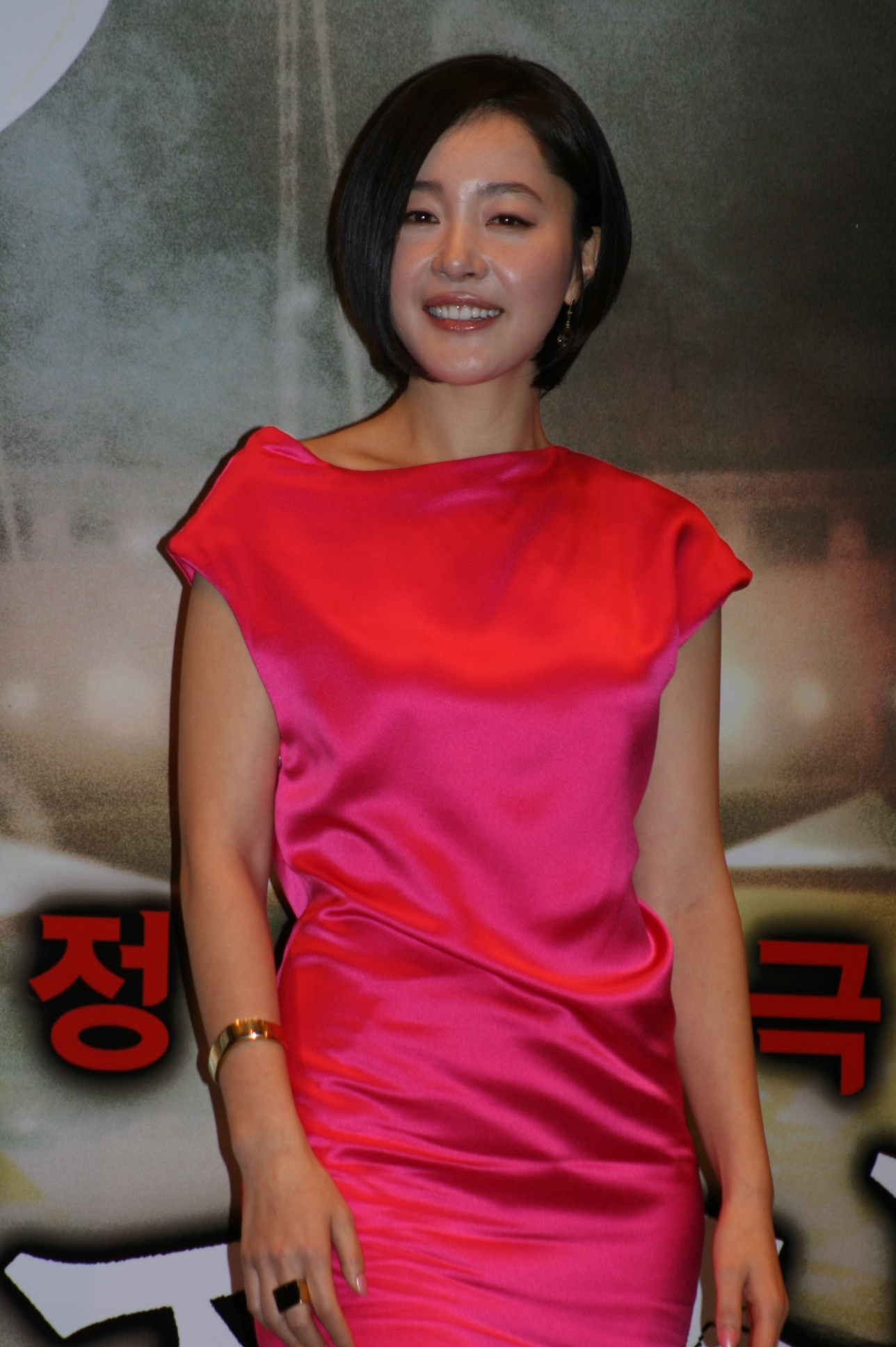
Uhm during Private Eye post-production press conference in February 2009

After a cameo in director Kim Jee-woon's 2008 epic western The Good, the Bad, the Weird, and a leading role in another Hong Sang-soo art film Like You Know It All, she was cast in her first period film, Private Eye. Uhm returned to lighter fare in 2010 with the romantic comedy series The Woman Who Still Wants to Marry.

In 2011, Uhm appeared an episode of BBC World's The Third Eye, a documentary series that spotlights up-and-coming countries. The installment of the eight-part segment on Korea is interspersed with interviews with Uhm giving her opinions on Korean culture, domestic movies and the Korean Wave. It also featured footage from her 2010 sex comedy movie Foxy Festival. Uhm, who was interviewed in Korea, was chosen in light of her impressive acting skills, natural charm and English fluency, producers said.

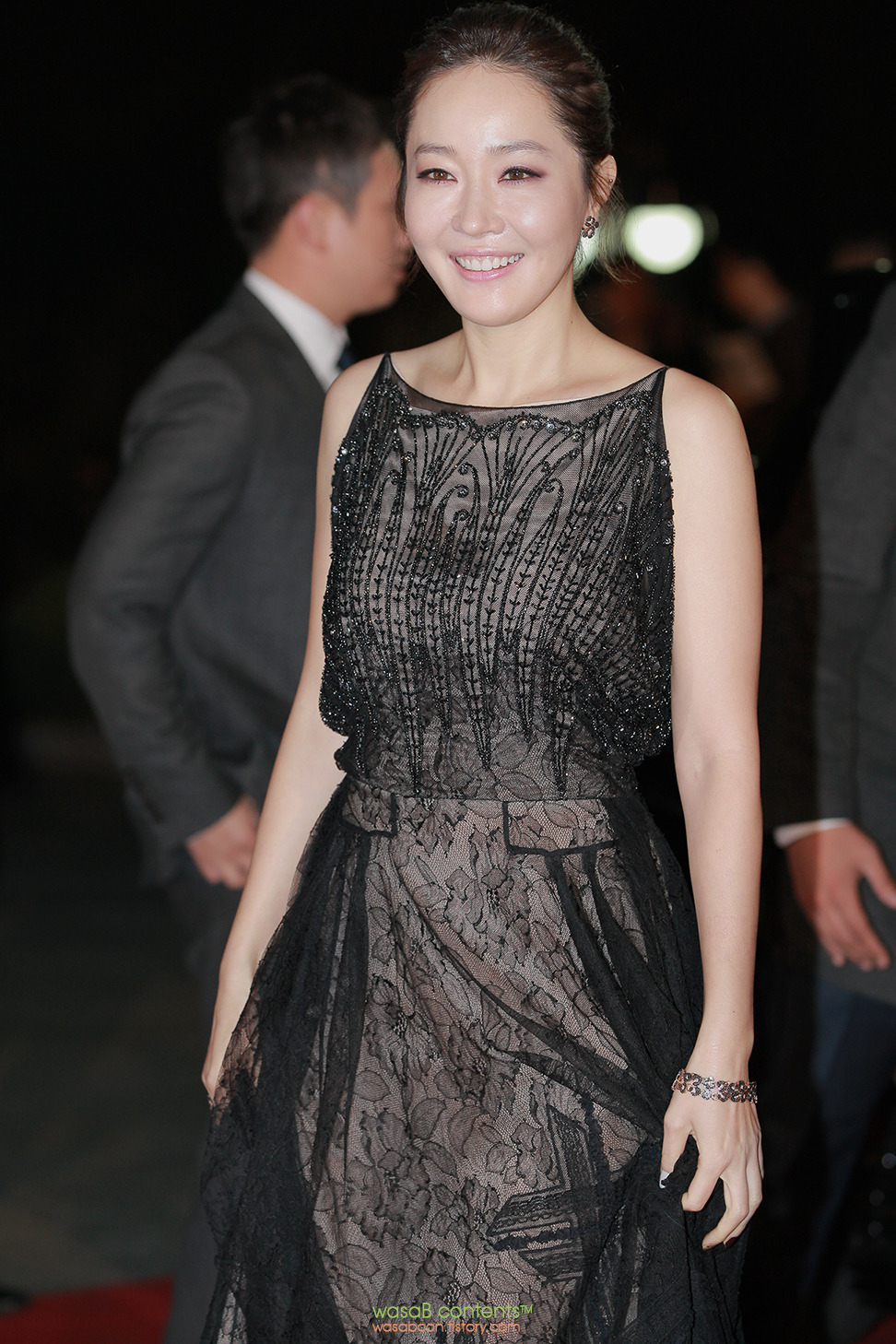
Uhm in November 2013

From 2012 to 2013, she starred in family dramas by renowned TV writer Kim Soo-hyun, Childless Comfort and Thrice Married Woman. This was followed by a well-received supporting performance in the gangster comedy Man on the Edge.

Uhm then played the mother of a sexually assaulted child in Hope; she said it was the first movie where she let go of everything, calling it one of her best works. Uhm won Best Actress at the Korean Association of Film Critics Awards, and received nominations at the Blue Dragon Film Awards and the Baeksang Arts Awards. This was followed by period mystery-thriller The Silenced, and sci-fi thriller The Phone. This was followed by kidnapping drama Missing, which won her Best Actress award at the Women in Film Korea Awards. Uhm then featured in crime action film Master.

In 2017, Uhm made a small-screen comeback in SBS' legal thriller Distorted, playing a public prosecutor. In 2019, Uhm starred in the body-swap comedy drama Spring Turns to Spring. The same year, she starred in the zombie comedy film The Odd Family: Zombie On Sale. In May 2019, Uhm signed with new agency C-JeS Entertainment.

In 2025, Uhm starred in Netflix's mystery historical television series Dear Hongrang alongside Jo Bo-ah and Lee Jae-wook. It is based on Tangeum: Swallowing Gold by Jang Da-hye and was produced by Studio Dragon.

== Personal life ==
Uhm is a member of Yeongwol Eom clan. She is a devout Protestant Christian, and together with Han Hye-jin was part of a church group called HaMiMo.

Uhm began dating architect Oh Young-wook in 2013; Oh is the founder of well-known architectural firm ogisadesign d'espacio architects (oddaa), and has also published several books on travel and art. They married on May 27, 2014, at the Shilla Hotel in Seoul. Later on April 6, 2021, she announced on her YouTube channel that she and her husband had amicably divorced and would remain friends.

=== Philanthropy ===
On March 12, 2022, Uhm made a donation ₩10 million to the Hope Bridge Disaster Relief Association to help the victims of the massive wildfire that started in Uljin, Gyeongbuk and which spread to Samcheok, Gangwon Province. On March 17, 2022, Uhm made a donation ₩10 millions to Save the Children's Children's Rights Film to help victims of the Ukrainian-Russian war.

== Filmography ==
=== Film ===
| Year | Title | Role | Notes | Ref. |
|---|---|---|---|---|
| 1999 | Vectorman: Counterattack of the Evil Empire | Princess Radia | | |
| 2000 | The Record | Older sister | | |
| 2002 | Over the Rainbow | Kim Eun-seong | | |
| 2003 | Mutt Boy | Kim Jeong-ae | | |
| 2004 | The Scarlet Letter | Han Su-hyeon | | |
| 2005 | Tale of Cinema | Choi Young-shil | | |
| 2006 | Running Wild | Kang Joo-hee | | |
| 2006 | Traces of Love | Yun Se-jin | | |
| 2007 | Epitaph | Professor Park's daughter | Cameo | |
| 2007 | Scout | Kim Se-young | | |
| 2008 | The Good, the Bad, the Weird | Na-yeon | Cameo | |
| 2009 | The End | | short film | |
| 2009 | Private Eye | Soon-deok | | |
| 2009 | Like You Know It All | Gong Hyeon-hee | | |
| 2009 | Invitation | Woman | short film | |
| 2010 | Romantic Debtors | Kim Mu-ryeong | | |
| 2010 | Foxy Festival | Ji-su | | |
| 2013 | Man on the Edge | Fortune Teller Myung | | |
| 2013 | Hope | Kim Mi-hee | | |
| 2015 | The Silenced | Headmistress | | |
| 2015 | The Phone | Jo Yeong-soo | | |
| 2016 | Missing | Ji-sun | | |
| 2016 | Master | Shin Gemma | | |
| 2019 | The Odd Family: Zombie On Sale | Nam-joo | | |
| 2021 | The Cursed: Dead Man's Prey | Im Jin-hee | | |
| 2023 | Jung_E | Lee Se-yeon | Netflix film; special appearance | |

=== Television series ===
Key
| † | Denotes television productions that have not yet been released |

| Year | Title | Role | Notes | Ref. |
|---|---|---|---|---|
| 2002 | Golden Wagon | Hwang Soon-jung | | |
| 2004 | Into the Storm | Oh Jung-hee | | |
| 2004 | Magic | Ha Yeon-jin | | |
| 2008 | On Air | Herself | (cameo, episode 5) | |
| 2010 | The Woman Who Still Wants to Marry | Jung Da-jung | | |
| 2011 | Sign | Jung Woo-jin | | |
| 2012 | Can Love Become Money? | Yoon Da-ran | | |
| 2012 | My Kids Give Me a Headache | Ahn So-young | | |
| 2013 | Thrice Married Woman | Oh Hyun-soo | | |
| 2017 | Distorted | Kwon So-ra | | |
| 2019 | Spring Turns to Spring | Lee Bom | | |
| 2020 | The Cursed | Im Jin-hee | | |
| 2020 | Birthcare Center | Oh Hyun-jin | | |
| 2022 | Little Women | Won Sang-ah | | |
| 2023 | Cold Blooded Intern | Choi Ji-won | | |
| 2024 | The Trunk | Lee Seon | | |
| 2025 | For Eagle Brothers | Ma Kwang-sook | | |
| 2025 | When Life Gives You Tangerines | Na Min-ok | Special appearance | |
| 2025 | Dear Hongrang | Min Yeon-ui | | |
| 2026 | Honour | Prostitution cartel new manager | Special appearance | |
| 2026 | The Substitute † | Shim Gyeong-oh | | |

=== Variety shows ===
| Year | Title | Notes |
|---|---|---|
| 2008–2010 | TV Entertainment Tonight | MC |
| 2010 | Road for Hope | Charity documentary |

=== Music video appearances ===
| Year | Song title | Artist |
|---|---|---|
| 2007 | "Goodbye" (Korean: 안녕) | KCM |
| 2009 | "Maze" (Korean: 미로) | Pearl (Korean: 진주) |

== Musical theatre ==
| Year | Title | Role | Ref. |
|---|---|---|---|
| 2009 | Our Sweet Days of Youth | Hye-rin | |

== Accolades ==
=== Awards and nominations ===
| Year | Award | Category | Nominated work | Result | Ref. |
|---|---|---|---|---|---|
| 2003 | 24th Blue Dragon Film Awards | Best New Actress | Mutt Boy | Nominated | |
| 2004 | 25th Blue Dragon Film Awards | Best Supporting Actress | The Scarlet Letter | Nominated | |
| 2006 | 27th Blue Dragon Film Awards | Best Supporting Actress | Traces of Love | Nominated | |
| 2007 | 15th Chunsa Film Art Awards | Best Supporting Actress | Traces of Love | Won | |
| 2008 | 5th Max Movie Awards | Best Supporting Actress | Scout | Won | |
| 2009 | 18th Buil Film Awards | Best Supporting Actress | Like You Know It All | Nominated | |
| 2010 | 18th Korean Culture and Entertainment Awards | Excellence Award, Actress in a Film | Romantic Debtors | Won | |
| 2011 | 3rd Asia Jewelry Awards | Sapphire Award | —N/a | Won | |
| 2011 | SBS Drama Awards | Top Excellence Award, Actress in a Drama Special | Sign | Nominated | |
| 2013 | 22nd Buil Film Awards | Best Supporting Actress | Man on the Edge | Nominated | |
| 2013 | 50th Grand Bell Awards | Best Supporting Actress | Man on the Edge | Nominated | |
| 2013 | Korean Film Actor's Association | Top Film Star Award | Hope | Won | |
| 2013 | 34th Blue Dragon Film Awards | Best Leading Actress | Hope | Nominated | |
| 2013 | 33rd Korean Association of Film Critics Awards | Best Actress | Hope | Won | |
| 2014 | 50th Baeksang Arts Awards | Best Actress (Film) | Hope | Nominated | |
| 2014 | 51st Grand Bell Awards | Best Actress | Hope | Nominated | |
| 2014 | SBS Drama Awards | Top Excellence Award, Actress in a Serial Drama | Thrice Married Woman | Nominated | |
| 2016 | 36th Golden Cinematography Awards | Best Actress | The Phone | Won | |
| 2016 | 21st Chunsa Film Art Awards | Best Supporting Actress | The Silenced | Won | |
| 2016 | 52nd Baeksang Arts Awards | Best Supporting Actress (Film) | The Silenced | Nominated | |
| 2017 | SBS Drama Awards | Top Excellence Award, Actress in a Monday–Tuesday Drama | Distorted | Nominated | |
| 2017 | 18th Women in Film Korea Awards | Best Actress | Missing | Won | |
| 2018 | 7th Marie Claire Film Awards | Marie Claire Award | Missing | Won | |
| 2019 | MBC Drama Awards | Top Excellence Award, Actress in a Wednesday-Thursday Miniseries | Spring Turns to Spring | Nominated | |
| 2021 | 57th Baeksang Arts Awards | Best Actress (TV) | Birthcare Center | Nominated | |
| 2022 | A-Awards | A-Awards Passion | Little Women | Won | |
| 2022 | 30th Korea Culture and Entertainment Awards | Top Excellence Award, Actress | Little Women | Won | |
| 2023 | 9th APAN Star Awards | Excellence Award, Actress in a Miniseries | Little Women | Won | |
| 2023 | 9th APAN Star Awards | Excellence Award, Actress in a Short Drama | O'PENing - Summer Cold | Nominated | |
| 2025 | 11th APAN Star Awards | Top Excellence Award, Actress in a Serial Drama | For Eagle Brothers | Won | |
| 2025 | 39th KBS Drama Awards | Grand Prize (Daesang) | For Eagle Brothers | Won | |
| 2025 | 39th KBS Drama Awards | Best Couple Award | Uhm Ji-won (with Ahn Jae-wook); For Eagle Brothers | Won | |

=== Listicles ===
Name of publisher, year listed, name of listicle, and placement
| Publisher | Year | Listicle | Placement | Ref. |
|---|---|---|---|---|
| Korean Film Council | 2021 | Korean Actors 200 (Note: Introduces 200 actors that best represent the present and future of Korean cinema to the people in the film industry all over the world.) | Included | |
