= Bamseom Pirates Seoul Inferno =

- Directed by: Jung Yoon-suk
- Produced by: Kim Hyo-jung
- Starring: Gwon Yong-man; Jang Seong-geon
- Release date: August 24, 2017
- Running time: 120 minutes
- Country: South Korea
- Language: Korean

Bamseom Pirates Seoul Inferno (Korean: 밤섬해적단 서울불바다) is a 2017 South Korean music documentary film directed by Jung Yoon-suk. It follows the exploits of South Korean punk band Bamseom Pirates' two controversial members, drummer Gwon Yong-man and bassist Jang Seong-geon, as they kick back against government censorship and society hypocrisy. It premiered at the 2017 International Film Festival Rotterdam, where it emerged as one of the most popular film of the festival with audience giving the film a 4.5 out of 5 ratings. It also won the Grand Prize at the 5th Wildflower Film Awards 2018, becoming the first documentary film to win the Grand Prize.

== Cast ==
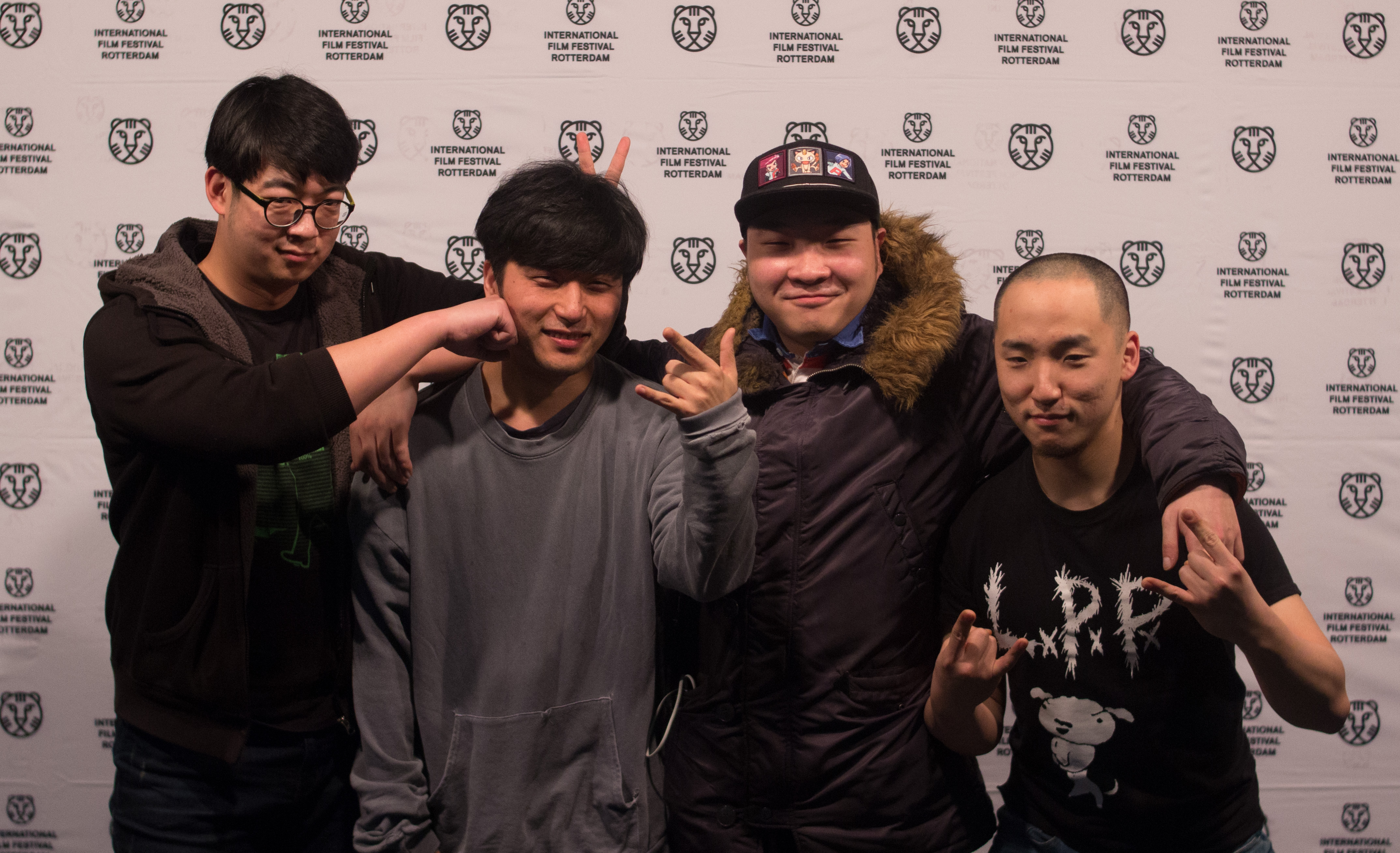
cast & crew at the International Film Festival Rotterdam 2017

- Bamseom Pirates
- Gwon Yong-man
- Jang Seong-geon
- Park Jung-geun
- Hoegidong Danpyunsun
- Kim Jong-hoon

== Awards and nominations ==
Year	Award	Category	Recipient	Result
2017	15th Yamagata International Documentary Film Festival	New Asian Currents Awards - Special Mention	Bamseom Pirates Seoul Inferno	Won
2018	5th Wildflower Film Awards	Grand Prize	Bamseom Pirates Seoul Inferno	Won
