= Method (2017 film) =

2017 film directed by Bang Eun-jin

- Theatrical poster
- Hangul: 메소드
- RR: Mesodeu
- MR: Mesodŭ
- Directed by: Bang Eun-jin
- Written by: Bang Eun-jin; Min Ye-ji
- Produced by: Kim Sung-eun
- Starring: Park Sung-woong; Oh Seung-hoon; Yoon Seung-ah
- Cinematography: Kim Hyoung-seok
- Edited by: Kim Sun-min
- Music by: Kim Jun-seong
- Production company: Mobetter Film
- Distributed by: At9 Film
- Release dates: October 13, 2017 (BIFF); November 2, 2017 (South Korea)
- Running time: 82 minutes
- Country: South Korea
- Language: Korean
- Box office: $182,019

Method (Korean: 메소드) is a 2017 South Korean drama film directed by Bang Eun-jin. The film stars Park Sung-woong, Oh Seung-hoon and Yoon Seung-ah.

== Plot ==
Veteran actor Jae-ha and idol star Young-woo are cast in a stage play called Unchain as Walter and Singer, respectively. Young-woo is initially uncooperative during rehearsals, arriving late and failing to display any interest in or enthusiasm for the play. Frustrated by Young-woo's flippant attitude toward acting, Jae-ha pushes him to change his behavior. Young-Woo becomes intrigued by Jae-ha's passion for his work, and devotes himself to his role, reading books Jae-ha gives him and accompanying him on outings to find props for the play. Jae-ha is well known for his method acting, by which he assumes the identity of his character and acts like him during the period of time that the play lasts; he even goes so far as to incorporate this new personality into his daily life. After learning about this, Young-woo secretly decides to put on the same method into practice, only to truly end up falling in love with Jae-ha.

Jae-ha's girlfriend Hee-won begins to sense the connection between the two actors as they grow closer. Jae-ha himself is increasingly tense and agitated, confused about his feelings for Young-woo, until one day he accidentally hurts Young-woo during a rehearsal. Later, he encounters Young-woo in the empty theater and the two share a kiss which is witnessed by Hee-won. The next day, Jae-ha finds Young-woo at his house and drags him into one of Hee-won's storage sheds, where Young-woo acknowledges his feelings for Jae-ha and they kiss again. The two drive to the beach together, where Young-woo posts pictures of them on Instagram which prompt rumors about the nature of their relationship. They are soon found embracing in the car by Young-woo's manager and Hee-won. Young-woo is driven away by his manager as Hee-won confronts Jae-ha about his sexuality. The day of the press conference for Unchain, Young-woo tells Jae-ha that he posted those pictures on purpose, because he wanted to share their love with the world. He then asks Jae-ha if he loves him, and begs him to tell everyone about their relationship. Jae-ha does not reply, but in the press conference dismisses rumors about them by saying that they were only acting, and requesting that people stop prying into their personal lives and instead focus on the play itself. Young-woo is devastated by this and visits Jae-ha's house while he and Hee-won are sleeping. The next day, after Jae-ha leaves, Hee-won becomes aware of another person in the house, and one of her sculptures is knocked to the ground and broken.

Young-woo arrives late to the first performance of the play, and as he and Jae-ha act, Young-woo's lines suggest that he hurt Hee-won, enraging Jae-ha. He asks Jae-ha to kiss him, and when he does, Young-woo whispers to him that the kiss was not in the script. In the final scene of the play, Young-woo acts out his character's suicide, but chooses not to use the safety mechanism, which causes him to hang himself temporarily. Jae-ha holds him up until the scene ends. Jae-ha finds Young-woo unconscious, but Young-woo wakes up and tells him backstage that now he is the perfect Singer, while Jae-ha is only a mediocre Walter. After realizing that he and Jae-ha will never truly be together outside of their roles, Young-woo abandons the prop finger in the studio, symbolizing his loss of their potential relationship. Despite the fact that the two have realized that they are indeed in love with one another, Jae-ha is unwilling to pursue him and instead leaves the theater with Hee-won as she is the only one he has left willing to accept him and his flaws.

== Cast ==
- Park Sung-woong as Jae-ha
- Oh Seung-hoon as Young-woo
- Yoon Seung-ah as Hee-won
- Ryu Tae-ho as Won-ho
- Kim Beom-jun as Young-woo's manager
- Lee Min-woong as Department head
- Gi Do-yeong as Assistant director
- Kang Jin-joo as Photographer
- Kim Yeong-bin as Stage manager
- Jo Soo-jeong as Hee-won's friend
- Cha Se-young as Hee-won's junior
- Park Sang-hoon as 2nd assistant director
- Lee Dal-hyung as Wrap-up party musician (cameo)
- Kim Hyun-joo as Radio DJ (cameo)

== Reception ==
HanCinema's Lisa Espinosa reviewed the film favorably, writing: "Pang Eun-jin's 'Method' is an exploration of the investment of emotion and self into art and a potent one at that. [...] The intense emotional journey of seasoned method actor Jae-ha (Park Sung-woong) and reluctant idol actor Young-woo (Oh Seung-hoon) is riveting and unhinged. Yoon Seung-ah's Hee-won is what tethers the characters and the story to reality - but only just barely. [...] 'Method' is a three-legged journey that converges into an almost painful cathartic release. [...] This story is less about the homosexual aspect of Young-woo and Jae-ha's relationship and more about how two people involved in art become wrapped up in each other. [...] To create beautiful, true art, one must throw oneself into that art, which is what Jae-ha and Young-woo do for better, and for worse."

She goes on to say that "Part of what makes 'Method' an effective film is the connection between Park Sung-woong and Oh Seung-hoon, the latter of which held his own in a difficult role and across from a powerful veteran actor. There is a lot of raw emotion to dig into that was beautifully portrayed and made the romance beautiful, whimsical, and utterly delightful despite all that surrounded it. Yoon Seung-ah slides into the film effortlessly, which a keen eye on the couple and a careful reaction to the situation that piques at a moment in the film that was well-timed by director Pang Eun-jin. [...] I was quite impressed by the way the movie developed after the climax and during the denouement, a point in time when many films flag."

Pierce Conran of Screen Anarchy, on the other hand, was unimpressed. He said the film is director Bang's "least impressive work as it trudges through thinly drawn and tired themes". Conran also went on to write that Method, as a queer film, is "almost irrelevant as it feels like a cheap trick to add something to a rote, forbidden-love narrative".

== Awards and nominations ==
Year	Award	Category	Recipient	Result	Ref.
2018	23rd Chunsa Film Art Awards	Best New Actor	Oh Seung-hoon	Won	
2018	5th Wildflower Film Awards	Best New Actor	Oh Seung-hoon	Won	
2018	27th Buil Film Awards	Best New Actor	Oh Seung-hoon	Nominated	
2018	55th Grand Bell Awards	Best New Actor	Oh Seung-hoon	Nominated	
