= Love Alarm =

2019–2021 South Korean television series

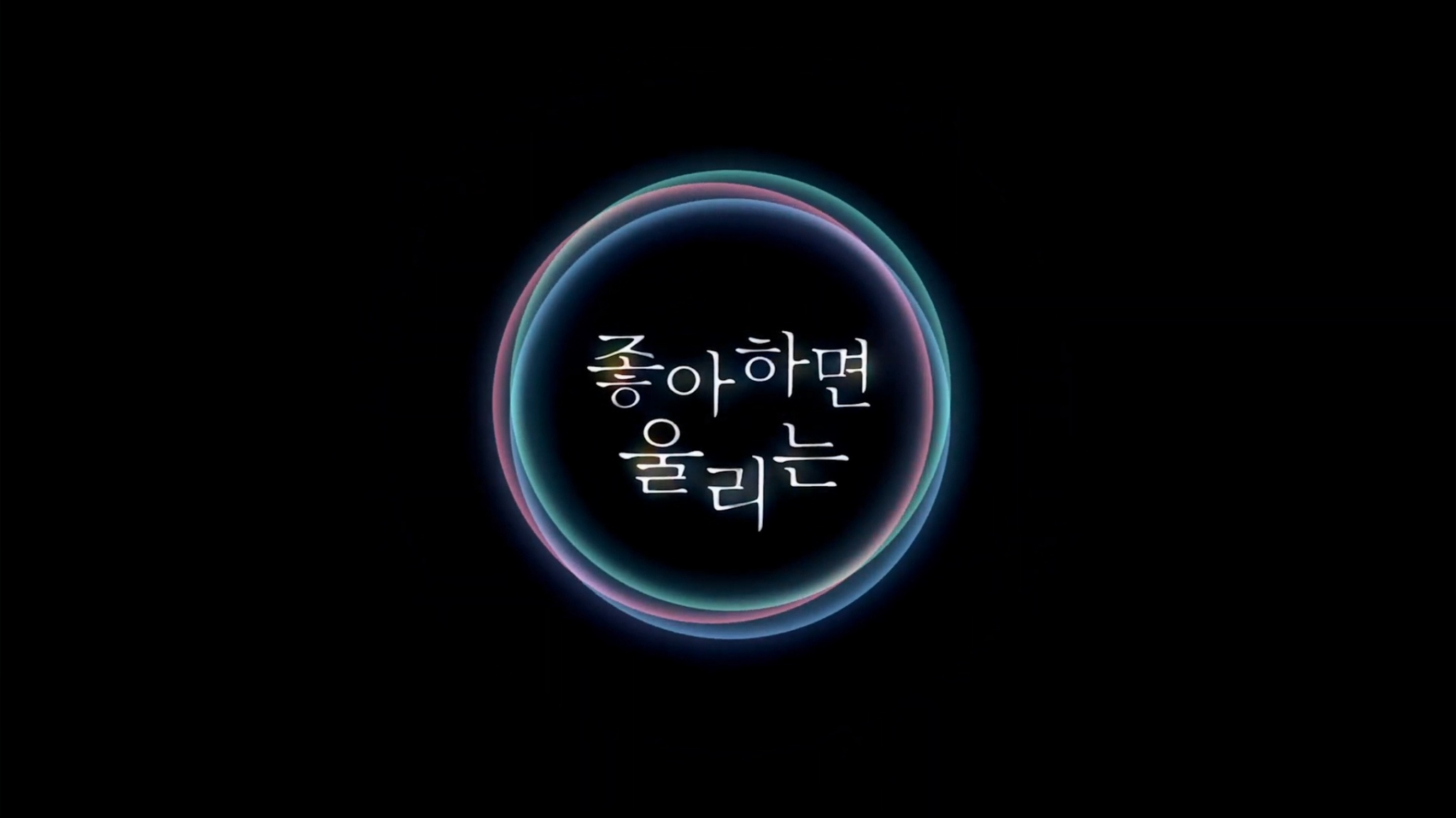
- Hangul: 좋아하면 울리는
- RR: Joahamyeon ullineun
- MR: Choahamyŏn ullinŭn
- Genre: Romance drama
- Created by: Ryu Bo-ra
- Based on: Love Alarm by Chon Kye-young
- Written by: Lee Ah-yeon (season 1); Seo Bo-ra (season 1); Kim Sae-bom (season 1); Cha Yeon-soo (season 2); Kim Seo-hee (season 2); Kwon Ji-young (season 2)
- Directed by: Lee Na-jeong (season 1); Kim Jin-woo (season 2); Park Yoo-young (season 2)
- Starring: Kim So-hyun; Jung Ga-ram; Song Kang
- Music by: Tearliner; Lee Kwang-hee
- Ending theme: "In My Dreams" by Tearliner (feat. Love X Stereo)
- Country of origin: South Korea
- Original language: Korean
- No. of seasons: 2
- No. of episodes: 14

Production
- Executive producers: Park Ji-young (season 1); Kim Jin-yi (CP); Hwang Chang-woo (season 2); Jo Hye-rin (season 2); Nam Gi-ho (season 2)
- Producers: Kim Ki-jae (season 1); Heo Seok-won (season 1); Jung Hyun-wook (season 2); Choi Yoo-ri (season 2)
- Cinematography: Kim Seung-ho (season 1); Han Dong-hyun (season 2); Yoon Jae-han (season 2)
- Editors: Bae Hee-kyung (season 1); Kim Hyang-sook (season 2); Kwon Da-hae (season 2)
- Camera setup: Single-camera
- Running time: 42–56 minutes
- Production companies: Studio Dragon; Production H (season 2)

Original release
- Network: Netflix
- Release: August 22, 2019 – March 12, 2021

Love Alarm (Korean: 좋아하면 울리는) is a South Korean romance drama series based on Chon Kye-young's Daum webtoon. Starring Kim So-hyun, Jung Ga-ram, and Song Kang, it follows a high school girl in a world greatly influenced by a mobile app capable of notifying whether someone within their vicinity has romantic feelings for them.

Love Alarm is the first Korean drama series confirmed for pick-up by Netflix. (Note: Although Love Alarm was confirmed first, Kingdom was streamed on the service before Love Alarm.) The first season of the series was released on Netflix on August 22, 2019. It was ranked as one of Netflix's top releases and was renewed for a second season in October 2019; season 2 was released on March 12, 2021. In 2021, the series managed to rank as the 6th most watched K-dramas worldwide in the platform. In 2022, it was the ninth most searched Korean drama worldwide.

== Synopsis ==
Love Alarm is the story of an app that allows users to discover love through an application which notifies users when someone within 10 meters has romantic feelings for them. Kim Jo-jo, a vibrant and enthusiastic highschooler gets caught into a love triangle between Hwang Sun-oh (a handsome model) and Lee Hye-yeong (a fun outgoing material artist).

== Cast ==
=== Main ===
- Kim So-hyun as Kim Jo-jo, a beautiful and hardworking high school student who is bright and cheerful despite her family's painful history.
- Jung Ga-ram as Lee Hye-yeong, a hardworking high school student who likes Jo-jo and is the childhood friend of Sun-oh. He is the only child of a domestic helper working at Sun-oh's house.
- Song Kang as Hwang Sun-oh, a handsome model and high school student who grew up as an only child in a rich, but uncaring family with lots of problems. He falls in love with Kim Jo-jo.

=== Recurring ===
- Go Min-si as Park Gul-mi, Jo-jo's selfish, egotistic cousin. She is a popular girl at school who likes Sun-oh but is asked out by Cheon Duk-gu, developing hatred for him. She also became jealous of Jo-jo at one point. She gradually matures and becomes more empathetic in the latter half of Season 2.
- Lee Jae-eung as Cheon Duk-gu, developer of the Love Alarm application.
- Song Seon-mi as Jeong Mi-mi, a popular actress who has a distant relationship with her son Sun-oh.
- Shim Yi-young as Bae Kyung-hee, Hye-yeong's loving and caring mother.
- Kim Young-pil as Hwang Jae-cheol
- Park Sung-yeon as Jojo's aunt and Gul-mi's mother.
- Yoon Na-moo as Kim Min-jae
- Shin Seung-ho as Jang Il-sik, a vibrant judo student and Jo-jo's ex-boyfriend.
- Ji Hye-ra as Kim Jang-go, Jo-jo's best friend. She secretly likes Il-sik. She and Jo-jo eventually drift apart.
- Kim Ye-ji as Sung Ji-yeon
- Kim Young-ok as Jo-jo's grandmother.
- Choi Joo-won as Choi Joo-won, Sun-oh's playful and energetic high school classmate.
- Yeom Ji-young as Jo-jo's mother.
- Song Geon-hee as Marx, a popular idol star.
- Kim Si-eun as Lee Yuk-jo, Sun-oh's new girlfriend.
- Cho Yu-jung as Mon Sun, Jo-jo's wedding hall co-worker.
- Bae Da-bin as Lee Wei-ju, Jo-jo's best friend
- Yoo In-soo as Student
- Ham Sung-min as Bullied student
- Bigman as OST Singer (Cameo; Season 1 episode 5)
- Ki Do-hoon as Brian Cheon, developer of Love Alarm (Season 2)

== Episodes ==
Season	Episodes	Originally released
1	8	August 22, 2019
2	6	March 12, 2021

No. overall	No. in series	Title	Directed by	Written by	Original release date
Season 1
1	1	"The Flash of Lightning Before It Thunders"; Transliteration: "Cheondung-i ulligijeon beongaega meonjeo chineun geotcheoreom" (Korean: 천둥이 울리기전 번개가 먼저 치는 것처럼)	Lee Na-jung	Lee Ah-yeon & Seo Bo-ra	August 22, 2019
A week after the launch of Love Alarm, dating remains less of a priority for Kim Jo-jo as she struggles to make ends meet. She cannot download the app because her current smartphone is outdated. Upon returning from the US, Hwang Sun-oh goes to meet Lee Hye-yeong. He notices Jo-jo and starts having feelings for her.
2	2	"There's Nothing Anyone Can Do When You Like Someone"; Transliteration: "Joahandaneun geon nugudo mageul su eomneun il" (Korean: 좋아한다는 건 누구도 막을 수 없는 일)	Lee Na-jung	Lee Ah-yeon & Seo Bo-ra	August 22, 2019
Sun-oh informs Hye-yeong he kissed Jo-jo and persistently asks him if he likes her. Hye-yeong firmly denies having feelings for Jo-jo despite the opposite being true. Park Gul-mi is desperate to have Sun-oh ring her Love Alarm but the loner, not-so-handsome Cheon Duk-gu does, much to her disgust. Jang Il-sik gets into a fight with Sun-oh and Hye-yeong after photos of Sun-oh and Jo-jo's kiss circulates in social media. Duk-gu gives Jo-jo the new smartphone he is supposed to give to Gul-mi as a gift. Jo-jo finally downloads Love Alarm.
3	3	"The Miracle of Two People Liking Each Other"; Transliteration: "Naega joahaneun sarami nareul joahanda gijeokgateun il" (Korean: 내가 좋아하는 사람이 나를 좋아한다 기적같은 일)	Lee Na-jung	Lee Ah-yeon & Seo Bo-ra	August 22, 2019
After being confronted by Jo-jo about the photos, Sun-oh uses his Love Alarm to confirm that Jo-jo likes him and he becomes her boyfriend. Kim Jang-go severs her friendship with Jo-jo, but Il-sik also stops being friends with her after learning she is the culprit behind the online exposé. An assault incident linked to Love Alarm prompts the school to ban the app among its students. Jo-jo's Love Alarm reveals that Hye-yeong likes her.
4	4	"The Best Feeling in the World Is Knowing There's Someone on My Side"; Transliteration: "Sesang-eseo gajang keun wiro nae pyeoni itdaneun geot" (Korean: 세상에서 가장 큰 위로 내 편이 있다는 것)	Lee Na-jung	Lee Ah-yeon & Seo Bo-ra	August 22, 2019
Jo-jo tells Sun-oh that she will not join the school trip to Jeju. The delusional Gul-mi tells Sun-oh about Jo-jo's poverty in her attempt to break the couple. Sun-oh sadly realizes that there is not much he can do for Jo-jo; he starts helping her by paying for her canteen fees in secret but not knowing it could embarrass her. Hye-yeong stays true to his unrequited love for Jo-jo and deletes his Love Alarm. Gul-mi lambastes Jo-jo after intentionally spreading rumors about her "mooching off" Sun-oh. Jo-jo runs away as her mind fills with the traumatic memories of her tragic past.
5	5	"The Gravity of Liking Someone"; Transliteration: "Joahaneun ma-eumui muge" (Korean: 좋아하는 마음의 무게)	Lee Na-jung	Lee Ah-yeon & Seo Bo-ra	August 22, 2019
While talking about her parents' death, Jo-jo tells Sun-oh that she intends to join the school trip. In another attempt to malign Jo-jo, Gul-mi reveals to Hye-yeong the entire truth of Jo-jo's past, only to be told off by Hye-yeong. A small accidental fire triggers Jo-jo's trauma and causes her to act strangely in front of her peers and teachers. Jo-jo escapes from the venue with Sun-oh. After spending the night together, a tragedy befalls on Jo-jo and Sun-oh on their way back to the venue. Jo-jo receives a strange DM from Duk-gu.
6	6	"Your Heart Is Safe Now"; Transliteration: "Ije dangsinui ma-eumeun bohodoemnida" (Korean: 이제 당신의 마음은 보호됩니다)	Lee Na-jung	Lee Ah-yeon & Seo Bo-ra	August 22, 2019
Four years later, news of a mass suicide of those whose Love Alarms did not ever ring shake the country less than a month before the release of Love Alarm 2.0. Jo-jo and Sun-oh are now apart from each other and living different lives; Sun-oh has a new girlfriend despite still having feelings for Jo-jo. Hye-yeong keeps on meeting Jojo at the library and admits to her that he plans to court her pre-Love Alarm era style.
7	7	"Something I've Been Holding Back and Can Only Say to You"; Transliteration: "Sumgyeodugo chamawatdeon mal neo-egeman hal su inneun mal" (Korean: 숨겨두고 참아왔던 말 너에게만 할 수 있는 말)	Lee Na-jung	Lee Ah-yeon & Seo Bo-ra	August 22, 2019
A brief flashback from four years ago reveals that Jo-jo, fearful about her relationship with Sun-oh, pretends she does not love him anymore by activating the "Shield", a special protective functionality in Love Alarm that only the developer himself can deactivate. Back to present time, Gul-mi steals Jo-jo's money to finance her entrance to the Love Alarm Badge Club. Hye-yeong brings Jo-jo to the Han River where the two scream out the words they have bottled up for a long time. Jo-jo receives an invitation to the Love Alarm 2.0 launching event.
8	8	"One Is Bigger Than Any Other Number in the World"; Transliteration: "Ireun sesang-ui modeun suboda keuda" (Korean: 1은 세상의 모든 수보다 크다)	Lee Na-jung	Lee Ah-yeon & Seo Bo-ra	August 22, 2019
Through Hye-yeong, Jo-jo understands what it really means to like someone. She realizes she does not need the Shield anymore and decides to meet with the developer at the launching event so that she can have it removed. Sun-oh and Hye-yeong drift apart from each other because of Jo-jo. Hye-yeong realizes who owns the popular Instagram account The Ringing World. As anti-Love Alarm protesters storm the entrance to the event's venue, the "developer" introduces Love Alarm 2.0 and its new feature.
Season 2
9	1	"Episode 1"	Kim Jin-woo	Workshop R -(Cha Yeon-su, Kim Seo-yi, Kwon Ji-young)	March 12, 2021
In an era reigned by Love Alarm 2.0, Jo-jo becomes Hye-yeong's girlfriend despite being unsure of her feelings for him, while Sun-oh remains affected by his breakup with Jo-jo years ago. Gul-mi is desperate to get into the Badge Club, in which Jo-jo (as the author of The Ringing World) is already a member. Hoping to find Duk-gu and have him remove the Shield, Jo-jo returns to her alma mater to gather information about him.
10	2	"Episode 2"	Kim Jin-woo	Workshop R	March 12, 2021
Jo-jo runs into Sun-oh at their alma mater. Hye-yeong and his mother are upset upon learning his father, a murder convict will undergo a review for parole. As Hye-yeong goes to see his imprisoned father, Jo-jo comes face-to-face with Love Alarm "developer" Brian Chon, hoping he can remove the Shield, but she does not get the answers she seeks. Sun-oh overhears the conversation and confronts Jo-jo.
11	3	"Episode 3"	Kim Jin-woo	Workshop R	March 12, 2021
12	4	"Episode 4"	Kim Jin-woo	Workshop R	March 12, 2021
13	5	"Episode 5"	Kim Jin-woo	Workshop R	March 12, 2021
14	6	"Episode 6"	Kim Jin-woo	Workshop R	March 12, 2021

== Production ==
My webtoon is about information technology, and I thought Netflix is the perfect platform to dramatize it. I was so happy when I received the offer from Netflix.

— Chon Kye-young, Yonhap News Agency

In January 2017, Netflix collaborated with Hidden Sequence to produce their first South Korean original series for the platform based on the eponymous Daum webtoon by Chon Kye-young. The series was planned to be released in 2018 but the premiere date was postponed to 2019 because of the delay in production for internal reasons, as reported by Korea JoongAng Daily. On September 4, 2018, Netflix announced that Love Alarm would now be produced by Studio Dragon, with Lee Ah-youn and Seo Bo-ra (Coffee, Do Me a Favor) writing the screenplay and Lee Na-jeong (Fight for My Way) directing. Kim So-hyun, Jung Ga-ram and Song Kang were cast for main roles; Song Kang was selected through audition competing with 900 people. First season with eight episodes was released on August 22, 2019.

In October 2019, Love Alarm was renewed for a second follow-up season. The first script reading for season 2 took place on February 21, 2020. On February 14, 2021, Netflix announced that season 2 would be released on March 12, 2021 and it would be written by Cha Yeon-soo and Kim Seo-hee, with Kim Jin-woo (Suits) directing and Ryu Bo-ra (Snowy Road, Secret Love) participating as script producer. Production H, which already collaborated with Studio Dragon in 2018 to produce Life on Mars, joined as a co-producer for the second season.

== Soundtrack ==
Love Alarm (Original Soundtrack)

Soundtrack album by Various artists
- Released: September 6, 2019
- Length: 64:11
- Languages: English; Korean
- Labels: Studio Dragon; Biscuit Sound

The soundtrack of Love Alarm includes seven songs and fourteen musical scores; it was released through several music portals on September 6, 2019. Vocals were performed by Tearliner, Klang and Hodge.

Instead of Studio Dragon's sister company Stone Music Entertainment (which had the distribution rights to soundtracks of most Studio Dragon-produced dramas), indie music distributor "Biscuit Sound" handled the distribution rights for the soundtrack.

CD 1
No.	Title	Artist	Length
1.	"Love Alarm" (feat. Taru)	Tearliner	1:46
2.	"In My Dreams" (feat. Love X Stereo)	Tearliner	4:05
3.	"Falling Again"	Klang	4:12
4.	"A Man for All Seasons" (feat. Zitten)	Tearliner	3:44
5.	"In My Little Mind"	Hodge	4:26
6.	"Blooming Story" (feat. Jo Hae-jin)	Tearliner	2:44
7.	"In My Dreams (Acoustic Ver.)" (feat. Love X Stereo)	Tearliner	4:07
Total length:			25:04

CD 2
No.	Title	Artist	Length
1.	"Morning Alarm"	Tearliner	1:12
2.	"Raindrop"	Kim Wanjung	2:06
3.	"Bygones"	Tearliner	1:59
4.	"I Won't Heartbreaken"	Lee Kwanghee; Seo Hyun Il; Min Jiyoung	4:11
5.	"We Finally"	Tearliner	1:38
6.	"Gaze"	Lee Kwanghee; Seo Hyun Il; Min Jiyoung	4:42
7.	"Dawn Whisper"	Tearliner	1:39
8.	"Two Hearts"	Lee Kwanghee; Seo Hyun Il; Min Jiyoung	3:43
9.	"Miss September"	Tearliner	1:23
10.	"At the Bus Stop"	Lee Kwanghee; Seo Hyun Il; Min Jiyoung	4:20
11.	"Trauma"	Lee Kwanghee; Seo Hyun Il; Min Jiyoung	4:30
12.	"Mirroring"	Tearliner	1:44
13.	"Jojo"	Lee Kwanghee; Seo Hyun Il	3:51
14.	"Voice"	Sentimental Scenery	2:09
Total length:			39:07

== Promotion ==
Love Alarm held an interactive experience zone from August 18 to September 1, 2019 at Lotte World Tower World Park Square. Each space was decorated as if the app function in the drama is visualized in reality and gave a romantic experience to lovers, friends, and family who visited the place. Also, an app that resembles the one in the series (but works differently) was released for the promotional events.

== Reception ==
=== Season 1 ===
On December 30, 2019, Netflix unveiled the 10 most loved shows in South Korea in 2019, in which the series was ranked eighth. Forbes's Joan MacDonald wrote that Love Alarm gives the familiar romance drama "a fresh twist" by introducing a mobile app and found that "Kim So-hyun is well cast as Jo-jo". Maggie Adan of Cosmopolitan Philippines wrote that she "initially found the motivations of the characters a little irrational and [shallow] ... but afterlooking back on [her] teenage years and recalling that [she] was prone to blowing things out of proportion and being melodramatic about love and relationships at that age, too, [she] realised that the show is actually more truthful than [she] give it credit for ... it just doesn't resonate with [her] anymore" Stephen McCarty from the South China Morning Post opined that "Love Alarm is not only an innocent love story but also deals with data protection, gay rights, the extreme consequences of heartache, and smartphone invasion."

Cinema Escapist's Richard Yu commends Love Alarm for being a social commentary on the negative influence of social media in today's society. He posits:

...you're probably thinking that Love Alarm is just a mediocre boilerplate high school drama—and on the surface, you'd be right. But once you peel back the layers of abstraction and inspect the story's elements, you'll find that Love Alarm is more like Black Mirror than High School Musical ... Love Alarm brings to light the dark side of social media: whether it's self-esteem issues, or how social media makes our relationships more superficial ... While Love Alarm comes up short in plot, it shines in social commentary that's increasingly necessary as we realize social media damages both our individual mental health and society's collective mental health .... The series is a bit of a Trojan horse for unassuming teen audiences: they might be drawn in by the Cinderella-like love story, but end up learning a lesson about the ills of social media addiction.

=== Season 2 ===
Season 2 of Love Alarm primarily received negative to mixed reviews from the critics. Pierce Conran of South China Morning Post gave a rating of 2 out of 5 and said, "There is even less meat to the story than first time around, and some jarring secondary plot lines that try to mix in social commentary are distracting." Greg Wheeler of The Review Geek gave a rating of 5 out of 10 and said, "Ultimately though Love Alarm serves up a lukewarm offering that's going to feel colder for fans expecting a red-hot follow-up to what's come before. If you can go in with no expectations, Love Alarm certainly has enough to enjoy, but there's equally nothing here that really stands out. This follow-up uses all the K-drama tricks in the book and does so with very little aplomb. This is one alarm that's very unlikely to ring for a third season." However, the series was generally well-received as it managed to rank as the 6th most watched Korean drama worldwide in Netflix in 2021. Gabriela Silva writing for "Screen Rant" said "when it comes to K-dramas, many only last for one season. The grand success of Netflix's Love Alarm, based on a webtoon from 2019 left fans wanting more drama, romance, and some answers to the fate of the main characters.

== Awards and nominations ==
Award	Year	Category	Recipient(s)	Result	Ref.
Seoul International Drama Awards	2021	Outstanding Korean Drama	Love Alarm (Season 2)	Nominated	
Seoul International Drama Awards	2021	Excellence Award, Actress	Kim So-hyun	Nominated	
Seoul International Drama Awards	2021	Outstanding Korean Drama OST	Tearliner feat. Jo Hae-jin ("Blooming Story")	Nominated	
Seoul International Drama Awards	2021	Outstanding Korean Drama OST	Klang ("Falling Again")	Nominated	
