= Jung Yoon-suk =

South Korean artist and filmmaker (born 1981)

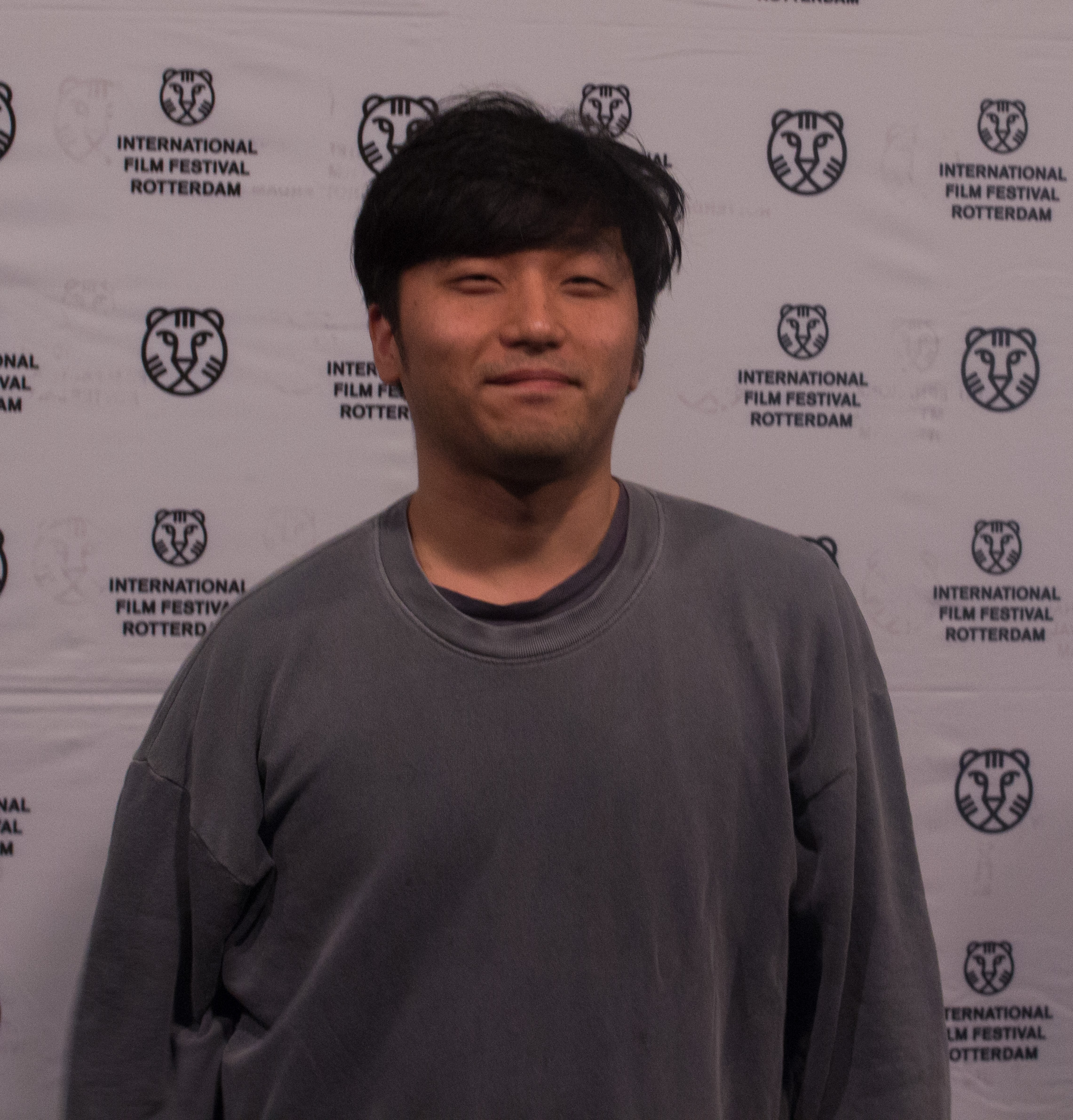
- Jung in 2017
- Born: July 18, 1981 (age 45); Seoul, South Korea
- Occupations: Artist; film director

Korean name
- Hangul: 정윤석
- RR: Jeong Yunseok
- MR: Chŏng Yunsŏk

Jung Yoon-suk (Korean: 정윤석; born 18 July 1981) is a South Korean artist and film director.

== Personal life ==
Born in 1981, Jung majored in Plastic Arts at the Korea National University of Arts.

== Controversies ==
In 2025, he was indicted for entering the Seoul Western District Court through a broken door and recording the riot scene. The film industry pleaded not guilty.

== Filmography ==
- Burning Mirage (short film, 2009) - director
- The Home of Stars (short documentary, 2010) - director
- Dusts (short film, 2011) - director
- Jam Docu KANGJUNG (documentary, 2011) - director, editor
- Non-fiction Diary (documentary, 2013) - director, producer, editor, cinematographer
- Bamseom Pirates Seoul Inferno (documentary, 2017) - director
