= Delta Boys =

- Theatrical poster
- Hangul: 델타 보이즈
- RR: Delta boijeu
- MR: Telt'a poijŭ
- Directed by: Ko Bong-soo
- Written by: Ko Bong-soo
- Produced by: Choi Yi-seul
- Starring: Baek Seung-hwan; Lee Woong-bin; Shin Min-jae; Kim Choong-gil
- Cinematography: Ko Bong-soo
- Edited by: Ko Bong-soo
- Distributed by: Indiestory
- Release dates: May 2016 (Jeonju International Film Festival); June 8, 2017 (South Korea)
- Running time: 120 minutes
- Country: South Korea
- Language: Korean

Delta Boys (Korean: 델타 보이즈) is a 2016 South Korean musical comedy-drama film directed by Ko Bong-soo.

== Plot ==
Four hopeless men who live at the bottom of the social ladder get together to take part in a quartet contest.

== Cast ==
- Baek Seung-hwan as Kang Il-rok
- Lee Woong-bin as Cha Ye-gun
- Shin Min-jae as Choi Dae-yong
- Kim Choong-gil as No Joon-se
- Youn Ji-hye as Ji-hye

== Awards and nominations ==
Year	Award	Category	Recipient	Result
2018	23rd Chunsa Film Art Awards	Best New Director	Ko Bong-soo	Pending
