= The Poet and the Boy =

- Theatrical poster
- Hangul: 시인의 사랑
- Lit.: A Poet's Love
- RR: Siinui sarang
- MR: Siinŭi sarang
- Directed by: Kim Yang-hee
- Written by: Kim Yang-hee
- Produced by: An Young-jin
- Starring: Yang Ik-june; Jeon Hye-jin; Jung Ga-ram
- Cinematography: Choi Yun-man
- Edited by: Lee Young-lim
- Music by: Koo Ja-wan
- Production companies: Jin Pictures; MiiN Pictures
- Distributed by: CGV Arthouse
- Release dates: April 29, 2017 (JIFF); September 14, 2017 (South Korea)
- Running time: 109 minutes
- Country: South Korea
- Language: Korean
- Box office: US$89,506

The Poet and the Boy (Korean: 시인의 사랑; RR: Siinui sarang) is a 2017 South Korean comedy-drama film written and directed by Kim Yang-hee.

== Cast ==
- Yang Ik-june as Hyon Taek-gi
- Jeon Hye-jin as Mrs. Hyon
- Jung Ga-ram as Se-yun
- Won Mi-yun as Old mother
- Bang Eun-hee as Se-yun's mother
- Inan as Se-yun's father
- Kim Myeong-jin as Girl
- Kim Jong-soo as Dong In's Chairman
- Kim Sung-kyun as Friend (special appearance)

== Awards and nominations ==
Awards	Category	Recipient	Result	Ref.
18th Busan Film Critics Awards	Best Screenplay	Kim Yang-hee	Won	
18th Women in Film Korea Awards	Best Screenplay	Kim Yang-hee	Won	
23rd Chunsa Film Art Awards	Best New Director	Kim Yang-hee	Nominated	
23rd Chunsa Film Art Awards	Best New Actor	Jung Ga-ram	Nominated	
55th Grand Bell Awards	Best New Actor	Jung Ga-ram	Nominated	
