= Namoo Actors =

South Korean talent management agency

Namoo Actors Co. Ltd.
- Namoo Actors' logo, which resembles a tree. In Korean language, "namoo" (Korean: 나무; RR: namu) is the local word for tree.
- Native name: 주식회사 나무엑터스
- Type: Private
- Industry: Management
- Founded: January 15, 2004
- Headquarters: South Korea: Samgyeong Building, 5th Floor, 96-4, Nonhyeon-dong, Seoul
- Key people: Kim Jong-do (President)
- Services: Talent agency
- Website: namooactors.com

- Korean name
- Hangul: 나무엑터스
- Revised Romanization: Namu Ekteoseu
- McCune–Reischauer: Namu Ekt'ŏsŭ

Namoo Actors Co. Ltd. (Korean: 나무엑터스), founded in 2004, is a talent management agency based in Seoul, South Korea. The founder and president of the company is Kim Jong-do.

== History ==
In 2004, Namoo Actors was established under the name "Namoo Actors Co. Ltd.". The company signed Song Ji-hyo, Kim Kang-woo, Kim Tae-hee and Kim Hye-na in 2005. Namoo celebrated their 10th anniversary party at CGV Cine City in Seoul on 10 January 2014. On February 21, Namoo Actors (Kim Jong-do and actors), family members, and fans held a memorial service for actress Lee Eun-ju, who died on 22 February 2005, in Seoul.

== Partnerships ==
In 2006, Kim Jong-do and actors attended the Busan International Film Festival and in 2007, signed a joint-network deal with China's Chengtian.

== Current actors ==
=== Males ===
- Cha Seo-won
- Han Tae-ha (2025–present)
- Kang Ki-young (2020–present)
- Kim Do-wan (2024–present)
- Kim Hye-seong
- Kim Jung-hwan
- Ko Woo-rim
- Koo Kyo-hwan
- Lee Joon-gi (2014–present)
- Lee Jung-ha (2017–present)
- Lee Jung-shik
- Lee Sin-seong
- Lee Tae-sun
- Oh Hyun-joong
- Oh Seung-hoon
- Park Sun-ho (2022–present)
- Song Kang (2016–present)
- Yoo Jun-sang
- Younghoon (2026–present)

=== Females ===
- Choi Hyo-ju (2022–present)
- Do Ji-won
- Jang Gyu-ri (2024–present)
- Jo Min-kyeong (2022–present)
- Kim Hwan-hee
- Kim Hyo-jin (2006–present)
- Kim Jae-kyung (2016–present)
- Kim Ji-eun (2024–present)
- Kim Ju-mi (2025–present)
- Kim So-yul (2024–present)
- Lee Na-eun (2022–present)
- Lee Yoon-ji (2009–present)
- Lee Yul-eum
- Park Eun-bin (2015–present)
- Park Ji-hyun
- Roh Jeong-eui (2013–present)
- Seo Ye-hwa
- Shin So-hyun

== Former actors ==
- Baek Do-bin (2010–2015)
- Baek Yoon-sik (2010–2018)
- Chae Bin (2016–2022)
- Chun Woo-hee (2011–2021)
- Han Hye-jin (2008–2017)
- Hong Eun-hee (2004–2026)
- Jeon Hye-bin (2009–2018)
- Ji Sung (2010–2021)
- Jo Dong-hyuk (2004–2014)
- Jo Han-chul (2013–2018)
- Jo Woo-ri (2022–2025)
- Joo Hae-eun
- Kim Ah-joong (2011–2015)
- Kim Ha-na (2018–?)
- Kim Hyang-gi (2011–2021)
- Kim Ji-soo (2004–2020)
- Kim Joo-hyuk (2004–2017; worked with Kim Jong-do since 1997)
- Kim Kang-woo (2005–2014)
- Kim So-yeon (2006–2018)
- Kim Tae-hee (2005–2010)
- Lee Eugene (Produce X 101 contestant)
- Lee Eun-ju (2005)
- Lee Kyu-han (?–2014)
- Lee You-jin (2017–2020)
- Moon Chae-won (2016–2021)
- Moon Geun-young (2004–2020)
- Nam Gyu-ri (2013–2014)
- Park Gun-hyung (2004–2017)
- Park Min-young (2017–2021)
- Park Sang-wook (2004–2016)
- Seohyun (2019–2025)
- Shin Se-kyung (2004–2021)
- Song Ji-hyo (2005–2011)
- Yoo Ji-tae (2013–2018)
- Yoo Sun (2012–2016)
- Yoon Je-moon (2012–2019)

== See also ==
- Fantagio
- KeyEast
- SidusHQ
