= Yeji =

Yeji may refer to:

- Yeji, Ghana, a town in Ghana
- Yeji, Lu'an, a district in China
- Yeji (singer) (born 2000), South Korean singer
- Ye-ji (name), a Korean given name and a list of notable people with the name
