= Shin Yea-ji =

Shin Yea-ji may refer to:

- Shin Yea-ji (figure skater born 1988), South Korean figure skater
- Shin Yea-ji (figure skater born 1984), South Korean figure skater

== See also ==
- Shin (Korean surname)
- Ye-ji (name), Korean given name
