= Shaving (film) =

- Hangul: 면도
- Lit.: Shaving
- RR: Myeondo
- MR: Myŏndo
- Directed by: Kim Jung-hoon
- Screenplay by: Hong Seong-yoon; Roh Do-hyeon
- Produced by: Han Hee-sung
- Starring: Roh Jeong-eui; Show Kasamatsu; Byun Yo-han; Shin Ryu-jin
- Cinematography: Jung Grim
- Edited by: Park Jung-hwan
- Music by: DPR
- Production company: Star Platinum
- Release date: October 2026 (BIFF)
- Running time: 93 minutes
- Country: South Korea
- Language: Korean

Shaving (Korean: 면도) is an upcoming South Korean psychological thriller horror film directed by Kim Jung-hoon. The film follows Su-yeon, a traumatised novelist and her lover confront a monstrous presence from her nightmares.

== Synopsis ==
Su-yeon, a horror novelist who is struggling to finish her new book, spends a holiday with her lover Shinji at a secluded country mansion.

Their quiet retreat takes a disturbing turn when Shinji accidentally cuts his face while shaving with an old razor. Soon afterward, his appearance and behavior begin to change as he becomes increasingly distorted and consumed by an inexplicable madness.

== Cast ==
- Roh Jeong-eui as Su-yeon

A novelist who lives with the wounds of the past.

- Show Kasamatsu as Shinji

Su-yeon's lover who stays by her side.

- Byun Yo-han as TBA
- Shin Ryu-jin as Mi-na

Su-yeon's friend.

== Production ==
=== Development ===
The film was directed by Kim Jung-hoon who directed Tinker Ticker (2013) and produced by Star Platinum, a production company known for producing Netflix film Good News.

=== Casting ===
On January 12, 2026, News1 reported that Roh Jeong-eui had been cast in the film, followed by Shin Ryu-jin and Show Kasamatsu. On May 8, 2026, the production officially announced the cast lineup, including Byun Yo-han.

=== Filming ===
Principal photography began in January 2026 and concluded in March 2026.

== Release ==
In September 2026, Shaving was selected for the Competition section of the 31st Busan International Film Festival, where it is scheduled to have its world premiere in October 2026.

The film is scheduled for a theatrical release in South Korea in the second half of 2026.
