= Seo Bum-june =

South Korean actor

- 서범준
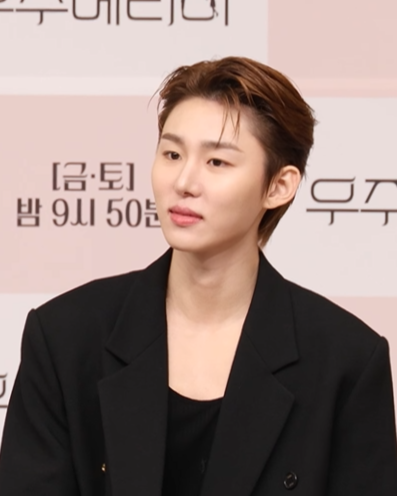
- Seo in 2025
- Born: Seo Bum-june; June 27, 1997 (age 29); South Korea
- Education: Seoul Institute of the Arts
- Occupation: Actor
- Years active: 2020–present
- Agent: Dareum Entertainment
- Height: 180 cm (5 ft 11 in)

Korean name
- Hangul: 서범준
- RR: Seo Beomjun
- MR: Sŏ Pŏmjun

Seo Bum-june (Korean: 서범준; born June 27, 1997) is a South Korean actor. He is known for his role as Lee Soo-jae in KBS2 television series It's Beautiful Now (2022), the streaming television series High Cookie (2023) and as a former co-host of SBS music program, Inkigayo.

== Personal life ==
=== Military service ===
Seo served his mandatory military service as a social worker at the age of 21 for 2 years.

== Career ==
In June 2025, Seo departed from Hook Entertainment after his contract expired and in August, he signed an exclusive contract with Dareum Entertainment, becoming labelmates with Park Min-young.

== Filmography ==
=== Film ===
Year	Title	Role	Notes	Ref.
2024	About Family	Kyung-rae		

=== Television series ===
Year	Title	Role	Notes	Ref.
2021	Nevertheless	Hwang Jin-soo		
2022	It's Beautiful Now	Lee Soo-jae	Main role	
2024	Nothing Uncovered	Lee Ba-reun		
2024	The Fiery Priest	Chae Do-woo	Season 2	
2025	The First Night with the Duke	Jung Soo-gyeom		
2025	Would You Marry Me?	Kim Woo-joo		

=== Web series ===
Year	Title	Role	Ref.
2022	Dr. Park's Clinic	Cha Ji-hoon	
2022	Rookie Cops	Choi In-sik	
2023	High Cookie	Song Jin-woo	
2024	Hierarchy	Nam Ju-won	

=== Hosting ===
Year	Title	Role	Notes	Ref.
2022–2023	Inkigayo	Co-host	with Roh Jeong-eui and Yeonjun	

== Awards and nominations ==
Name of the award ceremony, year presented, category, nominee of the award, and the result of the nomination
Award ceremony	Year	Category	Nominee / Work	Result	Ref.
Asia Artist Awards	2022	Rookie of the Year Award – Actor	It's Beautiful Now	Won	
KBS Drama Awards	2022	Best New Actor	It's Beautiful Now	Nominated	
SBS Drama Awards	2024	Best New Actor	The Fiery Priest – Season 2	Won	
SBS Drama Awards	2025	Best Supporting Actor in a Miniseries Romance/Comedy Drama	Would You Marry Me?	Won	
