= Hierarchy (TV series) =

2024 South Korean television series

- Promotional poster
- Hangul: 하이라키
- RR: Hairaki
- MR: Hairak'i
- Genre: Teen drama; Romance; Mystery
- Written by: Chu Hye-mi
- Directed by: Bae Hyeon-jin
- Starring: Roh Jeong-eui; Lee Chae-min; Kim Jae-won; Ji Hye-won; Lee Won-jung
- Music by: Kim Tae-seong
- Country of origin: South Korea
- Original language: Korean
- No. of episodes: 7

Production
- Running time: 58–75 minutes
- Production company: Studio Dragon

Original release
- Network: Netflix
- Release: June 7, 2024

Hierarchy (Korean: 하이라키) is a 2024 South Korean teen romance television series written by Chu Hye-mi, directed by Bae Hyeon-jin, and starring Roh Jeong-eui, Lee Chae-min, Kim Jae-won, Ji Hye-won, and Lee Won-jung. The story is set in Jooshin High School, which prides itself on providing the best high-quality education service in South Korea and where the top 0.01% of children gather. It was released on Netflix on June 7, 2024, and received generally negative reviews.

== Synopsis ==
Founded by South Korea conglomerate, the Jooshin Group, Jooshin High School is a place where children are chosen from the moment they are born. At this private high school, a story of love, friendship, revenge, and compassion unfolds among eighteen young people.

== Cast and characters ==
=== Main ===
- Roh Jeong-eui as Jung Jae-i

The eldest daughter of the Jaeyul Group, a rival of Jooshin Group, and the queen of Jooshin High School.

- Lee Chae-min as Kang Ha

A transfer student at Jooshin High School who keeps a secret behind his bright smile.

- Kim Jae-won as Kim Ri-an

The number one high school student and successor to the Jooshin Group.

- Ji Hye-won as Yoon He-ra

The youngest daughter of International Yoon, a leading Korean trading company, and the embodiment of jealousy.

- Lee Won-jung as Lee Woo-jin

The second son of a family that has produced politicians for generations, and who has both good looks and kindness.

=== Supporting ===
- Kim Tae-jung as Choi Yun-seok

The third son of the Army Chief of Staff. He is a rebel who lives and dies by loyalty and is the top fighter in the school.

- Seo Bum-june as Nam Ju-won

The class president of Jooshin High School who is the Principal's son.

- Kwon Eun-bin as Gil Ye-ji

A high class student at Jooshin High School.

- Yoon Seok-ho as Tae-ho

A student at Jooshin High School with a past connection to Ha.

- Bae Hae-sun as Park Hui-seon

Principal and stern lady.

- Seo Jun as Kim Seon-woo

A freshman at Jooshin High School who immediately catches the attention of the students and becomes a hot topic.

- Kim Min-chul as Kang In-han

A calm and attentive student at Jooshin High School. He was ranked first in the country and entered the school as a scholar student but died in a sudden accident, leaving behind questions.

== Episodes ==
No.	Title	Directed by	Written by	Original release date
1	"Newbie Party: Truth or Dare"; Transliteration: "Nyubipati: jinsil hogeun dojeon" (Korean: 뉴비파티: 진실 혹은 도전)	Bae Hyeon-jin	Chu Hye-mi	June 7, 2024
2	"Secret: Within a Secret"; Transliteration: "Bimil: geurigo bimil" (Korean: 비밀: 그리고 비밀)	Bae Hyeon-jin	Chu Hye-mi	June 7, 2024
3	"Hierarchy: A League of Their Own"; Transliteration: "Hairaki: geudeurui jilseo" (Korean: 하이라키: 그들의 질서)	Bae Hyeon-jin	Chu Hye-mi	June 7, 2024
4	"Revenge, Desire, Romance: The Heart of the Matter"; Transliteration: "Boksu, yongmang, romaenseu: geudeurui jinsim" (Korean: 복수, 욕망, 로맨스: 그들의 진심)	Bae Hyeon-jin	Chu Hye-mi	June 7, 2024
5	"Outstanding Outsiders: The Kangs"; Transliteration: "Ibangin: ganginhan gangha" (Korean: 이방인: 강인한 강하)	Bae Hyeon-jin	Chu Hye-mi	June 7, 2024
6	"An Arrow: To the Heart"; Transliteration: "Hwal: moduui simjange nameul" (Korean: 활: 모두의 심장에 남을)	Bae Hyeon-jin	Chu Hye-mi	June 7, 2024
7	"Spring Time: Our Short, Vulnerable Yet Precious Chapter"; Transliteration: "Spring time: jjalgo pureureun, geudeurui seotun bomnal" (Korean: Spring time: 짧고 푸르른, 그들의 서툰 봄날)	Bae Hyeon-jin	Chu Hye-mi	June 7, 2024

== Production ==
=== Development ===
Produced by Studio Dragon, the series was helmed by Bae Hyun-jin, who co-directed Start-Up (2020), Big Mouth (2022), and Alchemy of Souls (2022–2023), and penned by Chu Hye-mi, who wrote About Time (2018).

=== Casting ===
In March 2023, Roh Jeong-eui, Lee Chae-min, Ji Hye-won, and Kim Tae-jeong were reportedly cast. The three, together with Kim Jae-won and Lee Won-jung, were confirmed to star in the series.

=== Filming ===
Filming took place in Seoul, Goyang, Incheon, Jecheon, Namhae County, Paju, Seocheon, Yangpyeong, Yangyang and Yeongam.

=== Music ===
The soundtrack album was released on June 7, 2024, together with the release of the series.

Hierarchy (Soundtrack from the Netflix Series)

Soundtrack album by Various artists
- Released: June 7, 2024
- Length: 34:26
- Language: Korean
- Label: Netflix

Singles from Hierarchy
- 1. "Rainy Days" Released: June 7, 2024

Track listing
No.	Title	Lyrics	Music	Artist	Length
1.	"Holler Time"	Mao	Cocona; Wise; Harry K; Olioli	Cocona	3:23
2.	"Ruin Life"	Croq	Spacecowboy; Jade	Kum Jun-hyeon (TIOT)	4:00
3.	"Rainy Days"	Mao	Cocona; Weather	Youra	3:35
4.	"Wonder"	Jeje	Dailog	Jeje	3:18
5.	"Desire"	Mao	Cocona; Wise	Cocona	2:44
6.	"Fake Paradise"	Oh Dong-jun	Oh Dong-jun	Xydo	3:43
7.	"Shrine"	Naiv	Naiv	Jemma	3:18
8.	"Lost"	Hamellie; Moon Si-won	Spacecowboy; Jade; Croq	Jimmy Brown	4:17
9.	"Your Eyes"	Oh Dong-jun	Oh Dong-jun	Dasutt	3:14
10.	"Mine"	Naiv	Naiv; Dailog	Kimmuseum	2:54
Total length:					34:26

== Release ==
In May 2024, Netflix confirmed the release date of the series to be on June 7, 2024.

== Reception ==
=== Critical response ===
Joel Keller of Decider wrote that Hierarchy "may be catnip for people who love elite school dramas" but "doesn't bring anything new to the genre". Sarah Musnicky of But Why Tho? rated it 4.5 out of 10 and wrote the series as "will likely fail to climb the ranks, missing a much-needed spark to make it memorable in a saturated Kdrama sphere". Jonathan Wilson of Ready Steady Cut gave it a 1.5/5 and described the series as "a lazy redo of every teen drama you've seen, though particularly Elite, as if we needed to see any more of that". Pierce Conran of South China Morning Post gave the series 2 out of 5 and wrote that "simple stories alone are not an impediment to a show's value as entertainment" and "the substance of those stories and the charisma of their characters are what count and, on both counts, Hierarchy falls short". Bhavna Agarwal of India Today gave it a 3 out of 5 and wrote that the series "had quite the potential", but sadly, "falls short of enough thrills to warrant a satisfying watch". Tanu I. Raj of NME gave a 2/5 and described that "despite a strong premise and intriguing trailers, this school drama about class inequality falls far short". Pallavi Keswani of The Hindu wrote that "rushed writing and hollow characters bring down the show".

=== Viewership ===
Hierarchy ranked second in Netflix's Global Top 10 TV (Non-English) category after three days of its release and was well received in 51 countries, being topped in Thailand, Indonesia, and Vietnam while it listed in the Top 10 including South Korea, Brazil, Chile, Colombia, Mexico, France, Nigeria, India, Hong Kong, and Taiwan. The following week, the series topped the chart with 48 million hours watched by 6.3 million viewers. Additionally, Hierarchy was also the fourth most searched show on Google Philippines for 2024.
