= Fantasy of the Girls =

2018 South Korean film by Ahn Jeong-min

- Theatrical release poster
- Hangul: 소녀의 세계
- RR: Sonyeoui segye
- MR: Sonyŏŭi segye
- Directed by: Ahn Jeong-min
- Screenplay by: Guk Yu-na; Ahn Jeong-min
- Produced by: Oh Seung-hyun; Yun Ki-jin
- Starring: Roh Jeong-eui; Cho Soo-hyang; Kwon Nara
- Cinematography: Kim Jong-jin
- Edited by: Son Yeon-ji
- Music by: Jung Hyun-soo; Kim Yong-joo
- Production companies: Big O Pictures; Nalgae Entertainment
- Distributed by: Dreamfact Entertainment; M-Line Distribution
- Release date: November 29, 2018
- Running time: 104 minutes
- Country: South Korea
- Language: Korean

Fantasy of the Girls (Korean: 소녀의 세계; RR: sonyeoui segye) is a 2018 South Korean romantic film directed by Ahn Jeong-min in his directorial debut and co-written with Guk Yu-na. The film starring Roh Jeong-eui, Cho Soo-hyang, and Kwon Nara, is about a 17-year-old girl who experiences her first love while finding her way through adolescence at an all-girls school.

The film premiered at the Seoul Independent Film Festival on December 3, 2016, and released in theaters on November 29, 2018.

== Synopsis ==
Seon-hwa, a first-year high school student, is unexpectedly cast as Juliet in a high school production of Shakespeare's Romeo and Juliet at her school's theater club after accompanying a friend to an audition. She meets Ha-nam, a popular senior chosen to play Romeo. As rehearsals progress, Seon-hwa develops feelings for Ha-nam, but begins to notice the close relationship between Ha-nam and Soo-yeon, the play's director. Caught between the two seniors, Seon-hwa confronts unfamiliar emotions and the complexities of first love.

== Cast ==
=== Main ===
- Roh Jeong-eui as Bong Seon-hwa
- Cho Soo-hyang as Jeong Soo-yeon
- Kwon Nara as Lee Ha-nam

=== Supporting ===
- Jo Soo-ha as Bong Seon-joo
- Park Soo-yeon as Ha Yoon-joo
- Jo Byeong-kyu as Go Woo-cheol
- Kim Soo-hyun as Student
- Kim Joo-yeon as Camera repair shop owner
- Kim Hyun-joo as Student
- Park Sol as Student
- Lee Kyung-hoon as Earth Science teacher

== Production ==
Principal photography began on June 9, 2016.

Roh Jeong-eui, Cho Soo-hyang, and Kwon Nara were confirmed to appear on June 13, 2016.

== Release ==
The film premiered at the Seoul Independent Film Festival on December 3, 2016. The film was invited at the New York Asian Film Festival 2017.

== Reception ==
=== Box office ===
The film was released in theaters on November 29, 2018, with a PG-12 rate.
