= Show Kasamatsu =

Japanese actor (born 1992)

- 笠松 将
- Kasamatsu at the 31st Busan International Film Festival in 2026
- Born: November 4, 1992 (age 34); Nagoya, Aichi, Japan
- Occupation: Actor
- Years active: 2013–present
- Agent: Independent
- Website: www.showkasamatsu.com

Sho Kasamatsu (笠松 将, Kasamatsu Shō; born November 4, 1992), usually rendered as Show Kasamatsu, is a Japanese actor. He is known for his performances in the television dramas Tokyo Vice (2022–2024), Gannibal (2022–2023), and Love You as the World Ends (2021), as well as the films Flowers and Rain (2020) and Ring Wandering (2022).

== Early life ==
Kasamatsu was born in Nagoya in Aichi Prefecture, Japan. He was scouted by an agency in Nagoya while in his second year of high school. After graduation, he moved to Tokyo at age 18. Until around 20, he worked part-time in restaurants while applying for background roles in films.

He began to take acting seriously after being inspired by other performers on set, later auditioning for small stage plays to gain experience.

== Career ==
In 2017, Kasamatsu joined the Dongyu Club talent agency after leaving AAA (Triple A). By 2019, he had appeared in 18 television dramas and films in a single year, ranking first among male actors in their 20s for total number of roles.

Kasamatsu played the rapper SEEDA in the 2020 film Flowers and Rain, his first leading role in a feature film.

In 2020, a contract dispute arose during his transfer from Dongyu Club to Horipro through Fine Entertainment, following his appearance in Love You as the World Ends (NTV). The disagreement was resolved later that year, and Kasamatsu officially joined Horipro.

In June 2022, he signed with the U.S.-based management company Brookside Artist Management and talent agency Creative Artists Agency (CAA). In May 2023, Kasamatsu left Horipro to establish his own independent office.

His international recognition grew with major roles in Tokyo Vice (2022) and Gannibal (2022–2023), the latter distributed on Disney+.

In 2025, Kasamatsu began his activities in South Korea. He appeared in the Netflix film Good News as Denji, the leader of a hijackers, and in the SBS series Taxi Driver Season 3 as Keita Matsuda, the head of the Japanese criminal syndicate Neko Money. He is set to appear in the South Korean films Scandal and Shaving.

On June 28, 2026, Kasamatsu signed an exclusive management contract with the South Korean agency Star Platinum, marking the beginning of his full-scale activities in South Korea.

== Personal life ==
Kasamatsu has described himself as having "intense emotional swings, from high energy to irritation." His motto is "Life is a journey to find your motto."

He trains three to four times a week and maintains a large appetite, recalling that he once ate up to seven meals a day as a student-athlete.

== Filmography ==
=== Film ===
Year	Title	Role	Notes	Ref.
2022	Ring Wandering	Sosuke	Lead role	
2022	Remember to Breathe	Masaru		
2025	Good News	The leader of the hijackers	South Korean film	
2026	Trophy	Hong		
2027	Karōshi		American film	
TBA	Shaving	Shin-ji	South Korean film	
TBA	The Degrees of Pain		American film	
TBA	Untitled Takashi Miike film		American-British-Japanese film	
TBA	Pamun	Sendo	South Korean film	

=== Television ===
Year	Title	Role	Notes	Ref.
2017	My Loser Husband	Keiichi Yanagita		
2021	Reach Beyond the Blue Sky	Keizo Shibusawa	Taiga drama	
2022-2024	Tokyo Vice	Sato Akiro	2 seasons	
2022–2025	Gannibal	Keisuke Goto	2 seasons	
2023	Ranman	Kōkichi	Asadora	
2025	The Narrow Road to the Deep North	Major Nakamura	Miniseries	
2025	Taxi Driver	Keita Matsuda	Season 3	
2026	Straight to Hell	Minori's ex-husband		
2026	Kidnap Game	Urushibara Haruki		

=== Video games ===
Year	Title	Role	Notes	Ref.
2026	Yakuza Kiwami 3 & Dark Ties	Rikiya Shimabukuro		
