= Ryujin (rapper) =

South Korean rapper and singer (born 2001)

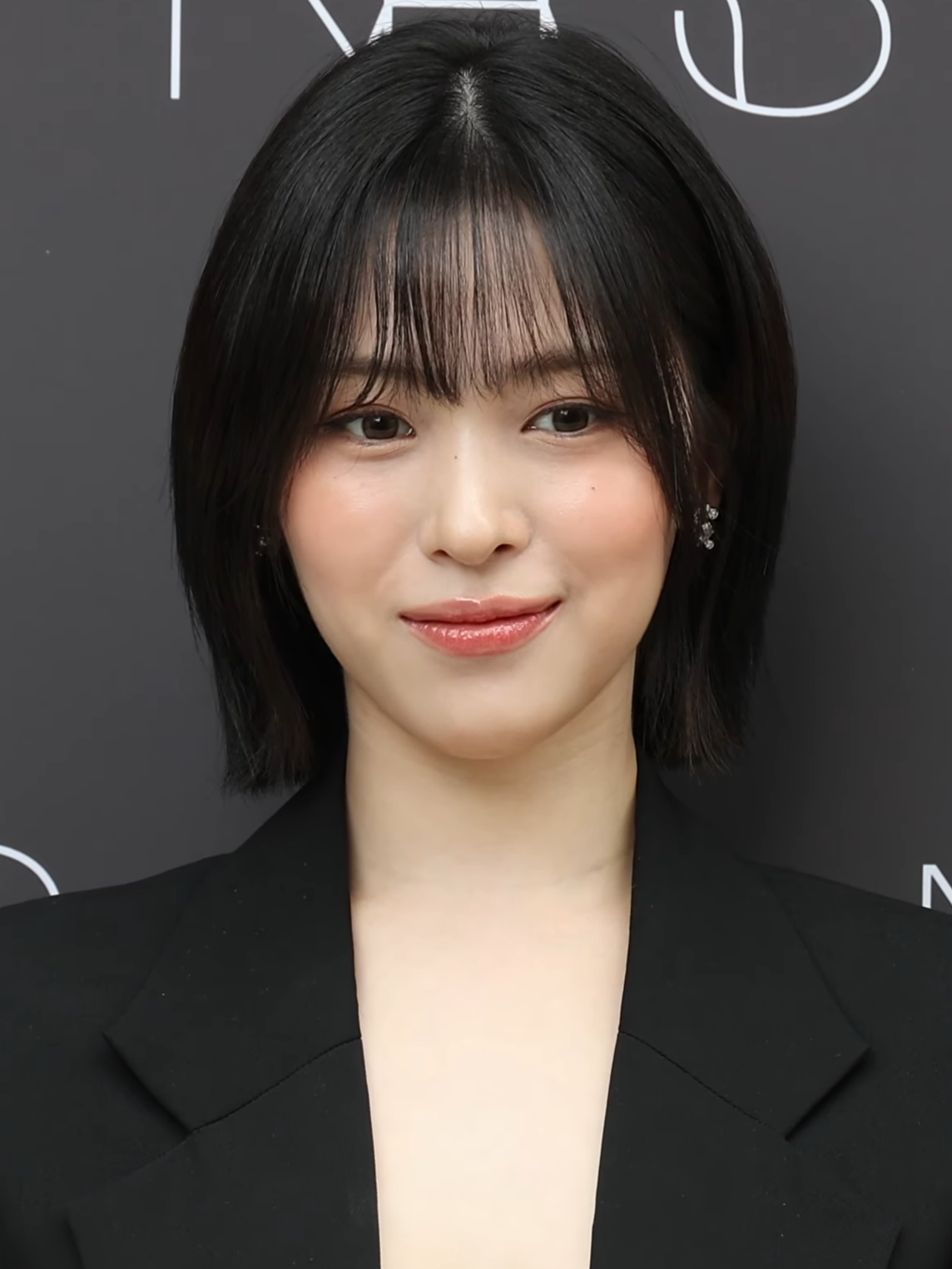
- Ryujin in 2026
- Born: Shin Ryu-jin; April 17, 2001 (age 25); Seoul, South Korea
- Education: Hanlim Multi Art School
- Occupations: Rapper; singer; dancer; actress
- Years active: 2017–present
- Musical career
- Genres: K-pop; J-pop
- Instrument: Vocals
- Years active: 2019–present
- Label: JYP
- Member of: Itzy

Korean name
- Hangul: 신류진
- RR: Sin Ryujin
- MR: Sin Ryujin

Signature
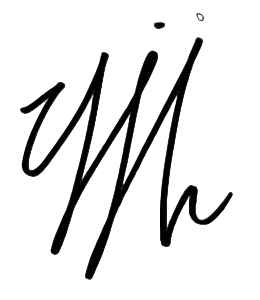

Shin Ryu-jin (Korean: 신류진; born April 17, 2001), known mononymously as Ryujin, is a South Korean rapper, singer, dancer and actress. She is a member of the South Korean girl group Itzy, formed by JYP Entertainment in 2019.

== Early life ==
Shin Ryu-jin was born on April 17, 2001, in Seoul, South Korea. While in middle school, she was cast by JYP Entertainment at a Got7 concert. She attended high school at Hanlim Multi Art School, where she studied musical theatre alongside Chaeryeong.

== Career ==
=== 2017: Pre-debut ===
In 2017, Ryujin appeared on the reality competition MixNine. She also participated in the first episode of Stray Kids alongside her future groupmates Yeji, Chaeryeong, and Yuna. In the same year, she appeared alongside Yuna in BTS's "Love Yourself" highlight reel and made a brief appearance in the political crime drama film The King.

=== 2019–present: Debut with Itzy and solo activities ===
On February 12, 2019, Ryujin officially debuted as a member of Itzy, with the release of their first single album, It'z Different, and the music video for its lead single "Dalla Dalla". In November 2021, she was selected as Studio Choom's "Artist of the Month" and performed a solo dance cover of Billie Eilish's "Therefore I am". In June 2022, Ryujin and fellow member Yeji performed Bebe Rexha's "Break My Heart Myself" in Studio Choom's "Mix & Max" series. On December 22, 2023, she released the music video for "Run Away", her solo track from Itzy's eighth EP Born To Be.

On November 6, 2025, it was announced that Ryujin had been cast as a lead, playing the role of Kang in the upcoming film Night on Earth. On January 21, 2026, it was announced Ryujin had been cast as a lead, playing the role of Mina on the upcoming horror thriller film Shaving. On February 27, 2026, it was announced Ryujin had received a casting offer to play a role in the upcoming movie High School Detective. Her casting in the movie has been since confirmed as she has been mentioned and referred to as part of the cast in articles confirming the presence of fellow actors in the film, as well as having appeared on a photo with the entire cast at the film's script reading. On July 5, Ryujin made a guest appearance on the workplace fantasy revenge comedy television series Reborn Rookie.

== Other ventures ==
=== Fashion and endorsements ===
Ryujin appeared in the April 2023 issue of Vogue Korea in a photoshoot featuring styles ranging from punk-inspired to sophisticated looks. In May 2023, she was invited as a guest to Gucci's Cruise 2024 fashion show at Gyeongbokgung Palace in Seoul.

In March 2025, Ryujin attended a Ralph Lauren event in Tokyo during the MLB Tokyo Series, where she collaborated with the brand by selecting and showcasing three outfits. She later appeared in the April 2025 issue of Vogue Korea, collaborating with Tom Ford Beauty for the Soleil Summer Collection.

=== Philanthropy ===
On April 12, 2022, Ryujin donated ₩50 million (equivalent to ₩54.13 million or US$38,069.65 in 2025) to The Promise to support those affected by the forest fire on the east coast of Gangwon Province. On February 14, 2023, she donated ₩50 million (equivalent to ₩52.25 million or US$36,747.67 in 2025) to the same non-profit organization to aid those affected by the earthquakes in Turkey and Syria.

== Discography ==
=== Singles ===
==== As a featured artist ====
List of singles as featured artist, showing year released and album name
Title	Year	Album
"Break My Heart Myself" (Bebe Rexha featuring Yeji and Ryujin)	2022	Non-album single

=== Other charted songs ===
List of other charted songs, with selected chart positions, showing year released and album title
Title	Year	Peak chart positions	Album
Title	Year	KOR DL	Album
"Run Away" (Note: credited to Itzy, but the track is a solo by Ryujin)	2024	40	Born to Be
"Look"	2026	12	Motto

=== Composition credits ===
All song credits are adapted from the Korea Music Copyright Association's database unless stated otherwise.

List of songs, showing year released, artist name, and name of the album
Title	Year	Artist	Album	Composer	Lyricist	Ref.
"Run Away"	2024	Ryujin	Born to Be	Yes	Yes	
"Focus"	2025	Itzy	Tunnel Vision	No	Yes	

== Videography ==
=== Music videos ===
List of music videos, showing year released, and directors
Title	Year	Director(s)	Ref.
"Run Away"	2023	Lee Hye-sung, Ha Jeong-hoon (Hattrick)	

== Filmography ==
Key
†	Denotes films that have not yet been released

=== Film ===
Year	Title	Role	Notes	Ref.
2017	The King	Jimin	Bit part	
2027	Shaving	Mi-na		
TBA	Night on Earth †	Kang		

=== Television series ===
Year	Title	Role	Notes	Ref.
2026	Reborn Rookie	Herself	Cameo (Ep. 12)	

=== Television shows ===
Year	Title	Role	Notes	Ref.
2017	Mix Nine	Contestant		
2017	Stray Kids	Contestant	Cameo in episode one with Team Girls	
2023	KCON Japan	MC	with Ni-Ki	

=== Music video appearances ===
Year	Song title	Artist	Notes	Ref.
2017	"Love Yourself"	BTS	Appeared as J-Hope and Jimin's friend and as J-Hope's dance partner in highlight reel	
