= Lee Won-jung =

South Korean actor (born 2001)

- 이원정
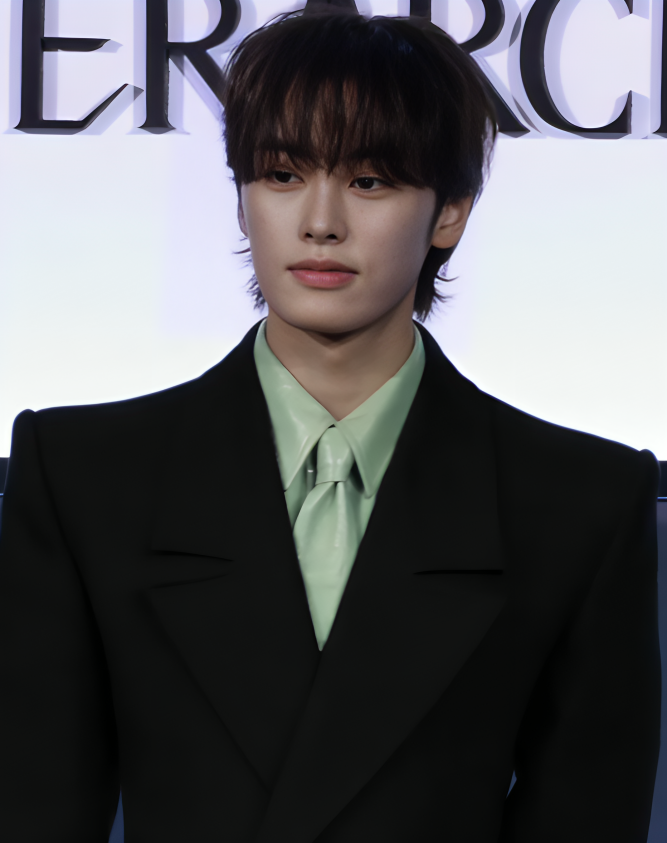
- Lee in June 2024
- Born: February 14, 2001 (age 25); San Francisco, California, U.S.
- Education: Gachon University (Department of Theater and Film)
- Occupation: Actor
- Years active: 2019–present
- Agent: Runup Company

Korean name
- Hangul: 이원정
- RR: I Wonjeong
- MR: I Wŏnjŏng

Lee Won-jung (Korean: 이원정; born February 14, 2001), is a South Korean actor. He is known for his roles in dramas such as New Normal Zine, Live On, I:LOVE:DM, Bio Homme, and My Perfect Stranger.

== Filmography ==
=== Television series ===
Year	Title	Role	Notes	Ref.
2019	Class of Lies	Lee Jeong-soo		
2020	Live On	Lee Hun-ho		
2022	New Normal Zine	Jung Seok-jin		
2022	Extraordinary Attorney Woo	Yang Jeong-il		
2023	Brain Works	Kim Joon-young		
2023	My Perfect Stranger	Baek Hee-seop (in 1987)		
2024	Serendipity's Embrace	Kwon Sang Pil		
2025	A Hundred Memories	Ma Sang-cheol		
2026	Doctor on the Edge	Jo Dong-seop		
2026	New Recruit	Kim Hyun-wook	Season 4	

=== Web series ===
Year	Title	Role	Notes	Ref.
2020	Real:Time:Love	Yook Deok-jin	Season 3–4	
2021	Bio Homme	Ko In-hyuk		
2021	I:LOVE:DM	Yook Deok-jin		
2021	Can You Deliver Time? 2002	Lee Min-hyuk		
2021	The World of My 17	Kwon Seung-ha	Season 2	
2024	Hierarchy	Lee Woo-jin		

== Awards and nominations ==
Name of the award ceremony, year presented, category, nominee of the award, and the result of the nomination
Award ceremony	Year	Category	Nominee / Work	Result	Ref.
KBS Drama Awards	2023	Best New Actor	My Perfect Stranger	Won	
