= Love You as the World Ends =

Japanese TV drama

- Season 4 poster
- Original title: 君と世界が終わる日に
- Genre: Drama; Horror; Action; Apocalyptic
- Written by: Natsuko Ikeda
- Directed by: Sugawara Shintaro
- Starring: Ryoma Takeuchi; Ayami Nakajo; Show Kasamatsu; Marie Iitoyo
- Opening theme: Not the End by Rei Yasuda
- Ending theme: Hoshi wo aogu by Masaki Suda
- Country of origin: Japan
- Original language: Japanese
- No. of seasons: 5 + Movie
- No. of episodes: 32

Original release
- Network: NTV; Hulu Japan; Netflix
- Release: January 17, 2021 – February 9, 2024

Love You as the World Ends (君と世界が終わる日に, Kimi to Sekai ga Owaru Hi ni) is a Japanese horror television / streaming series co-produced by NTV and Hulu Japan. The series features an ensemble cast as survivors of a zombie apocalypse trying to stay alive under near-constant threat of attacks from zombies.

Season 1 was broadcast on NTV from January 17 to March 21, 2021 with 10 episodes. Season 2 was shown on Hulu Japan and was broadcast from March 21 to April 25, 2021, with 6 episodes. Season 3 was shown on Hulu from February 25 to April 1, 2022 with 6 episodes. Season 4 premiered on Hulu again, with all 5 episodes simultaneously released on March 19, 2023.

Two specials were released in 2022 and 2023.

A concluding film titled Love You as the World Ends The Movie - FINAL (劇場版 君と世界が終わる日に FINAL, Gekijō-ban-kun to sekai ga owaru hi ni FINAL) starring Ryoma Takeuchi, Fumiya Takahashi and Mayu Hotta was released on January 26, 2024.

A fifth and final season featuring new cast members including Tina Tamashiro and Marie Iitoyo premiered on February 9, 2024. This season, comprising five episodes, takes place during the events of the final film and brings the entire franchise to a close.

== Synopsis ==
=== Season 1 (10 episodes) ===
Hibiki Mamiya is a car mechanic who has been dating his girlfriend, Kurumi Ogasawara, since high school. On the day when he was going to propose to her, he was trapped in a tunnel collapse. When he escaped 4 days later, the outside world had changed completely to be invaded by zombies known as 'golems'. Hibiki met and worked with both old and new friends as he fought his way to be reunited with his girlfriend.

=== Season 2 (6 episodes) ===
Hibiki and his team arrived at a shelter 'House of Hope' and discovered that the place hid more secrets than it appeared. The search for the vaccine against the golem virus revealed the truth of what happened to Hibiki's family 16 years ago.

=== Season 3 (6 episodes) ===
The story takes place 10 months after the end of Season 2. As Hibiki and Yuzuki embarked on their lone journey, they encountered a religious cult which was threatened by a new mysterious group 'X'. Meanwhile, Kurumi decided to carry on with her pregnancy despite being infected with the golem virus.

=== Season 4 (5 episodes) ===
The story takes place 20 months after the end of Season 3. Hibiki has lost his friends and loved ones who fought alongside him, and even his beloved child, Mirai, has been taken from him. Severely wounded, Hibiki wanders alone through the apocalypse, only to be rescued by the Niiyama Foundation Group led by Asuha Niiyama.

=== Final (Movie) ===
The film continues from Season 4, which Hibiki infiltrated the Utopia towers to search for his daughter, Mirai. There, He encounters Yamato, a young man trying to find his girlfriend Aoi, who got separated from him in the aftermath of the outbreak. A startling revelation was disclosed at the end of the movie with regards to the fate of Mirai 20 years later.

=== Season 5 (5 episodes) ===
The season follows the foundation group led by Asuha Niiyama.

== Cast ==
- Ryoma Takeuchi as Hibiki Mamiya (Season 1–4, Final)
- Ayami Nakajo as Kurumi Ogasawara (Season 1–3)
- Show Kasamatsu as Hiro Todoroki (Season 1–3)
- Marie Iitoyo as Kanae Hiiragi (Season 1–5)
- Naho Yokomizo as Yuzuki Mihara (Season 1–3, 5)
- Kenichi Takito as Kouki Shuto (Season 1)
- Kim Jae-hyun as Yoon Min-jun / Kai (Season 1–3)
- Hyunri as Yoon Ji-An (Season 1–3)
- Makita Sports as Yohei Komoto (Season 1–2)
- Tamae Ando as Shoko Mihara (Season 1–2)
- Toshihito Kokubo as Tsuboi (Season 1–3, 5)
- Kodai Asaka as Rikuto Kuwata (Season 1–2)
- Michiko Tanaka as Haru (Season 1–2)
- Kenta Suga as Shinji Murota (Season 3, Final)
- Atomu Mizuishi as Inaba (Season 3)
- Tetsuji Tamayama as Wantiti (Season 3)
- Hinako Sakurai as Iori Miyagi (Season 3-4)
- Tina Tamashiro as Asuha Niiyama (Season 4-5)
- Riku Ohnishi as Daichi Niiyama (Season 4)
- Junpei Mizobata as Soichi Kashu (Season 4)
- Goki Maeda as Kaito Shimomura (Season 4)
- Nobuo Kyo as Rikuto Shimomura (Season 4)
- Jun Hashimoto as Mikio Orita (Season 4)
- Hinako Sano as Yura Nosaka (Season 4)
- Hayato Kakizawa as Toma (Season 4)
- Fumiya Takahashi as Yamato Shibasaki (Final)
- Mayu Hotta as Aoi Hatori (Final)
- Kotaro Yoshida as Gen Saijo (Final)
