= The Witch (TV series) =

2025 South Korean television series

- Teaser poster
- Hangul: 마녀
- RR: Manyeo
- MR: Manyŏ
- Genre: Mystery; Romance
- Based on: The Witch by Kang Full
- Written by: Jo Yoo-jin
- Directed by: Kim Tae-gyun
- Starring: Park Jin-young; Roh Jeong-eui
- Music by: Kim Joon-seok: Jeong Se-rin
- Country of origin: South Korea
- Original language: Korean
- No. of episodes: 10

Production
- Executive producers: Park Jeong-eun (CP); Kim Ji-soo
- Producers: Shin Young-il; Choi In-jun; Jeong Su-jin; Yoo Jae-hyeok; Sil Se-yoon
- Production companies: Showbox; Mr. Romance Co.

Original release
- Network: Channel A
- Release: February 15 – March 16, 2025

The Witch (Korean: 마녀) is a 2025 South Korean television series starring Park Jin-young and Roh Jeong-eui. Directed by Kim Tae-gyun, it is based on the webtoon of the same name by Kang Full. It aired on Channel A from February 15 to March 16, 2025, every Saturday and Sunday at 21:15 (KST). It is also available for streaming on TVING, Netflix and Lifetime in South Korea, U-Next in Japan, and Viu and Viki in selected regions.

== Synopsis ==
Ever since her mother died giving birth to her, Park Mi-jeong has been the subject of gossip. Her unique and mysterious aura attracts attention, but since all the boys who get close to her get injured or killed, people start calling her a "witch," eventually driving her away from the world. As an adult, Mi-jeong leads a very solitary life, working as an English translator from a secluded apartment, only emerging early in the morning when no one is around.

Lee Dong-jin attended high school with Mi-jeong, but never spoke to her despite his curiosity and admiration. Firmly convinced that she was not a witch, he studied statistics to analyze her case and, ten years later, has become one of the most highly regarded data miners in the field. One day Dong-jin meets Mi-jeong by chance on the Seoul subway and, seeing that strange events continue to happen around her, begins to investigate her past and secretly follow her to identify a pattern.

== Cast ==
=== Main ===
- Park Jin-young as Lee Dong-jin

A data miner investigating Mi-jeong's mysterious case.

- Roh Jeong-eui as Park Mi-jeong

A woman shunned due to unexplained events surrounding her.

=== Supporting ===
- Im Jae-hyuk as Kim Joong-hyuk

A major crime detective.

- Jang Hee-ryung as Heo Eun-sil
- Jang Hye-jin as Oh Mi-sook

Dong-jin's mother.

- Ahn Nae-sang as Park Byeong-jae

Mi-jeong's father.

- Kwon Han-sol as Seo Da-eun
- Joo Jong-hyuk as Im Ik-jong

Mi-jeong's first love.

- Bae Yoon-gyu as Kim Jung-hwan

Mijeong's classmate.

=== Special appearances ===
- Ju Ji-hoon as Baek-su
- Yoon Park as Baek-su's brother
- Park Bo-kyung as Realtor
- Jin Seon-kyu as Hwang Jung-sik

Dong-jin's statistics teacher.

== Episodes ==
No.	Title	Directed by	Written by	Original release date
1	"The Female Student"; Transliteration: "Yeohaksaeng" (Korean: 여학생)	Kim Tae-gyun	Jo Yoo-jin	February 15, 2025
2	"The Witch Park Mi-jeong"; Transliteration: "Manyeo, Bak Mijeong" (Korean: 마녀, 박미정)	Kim Tae-gyun	Jo Yoo-jin	February 16, 2025
3	"Coincidence"; Transliteration: "U-yeon-ui ilchi" (Korean: 우연의 일치)	Kim Tae-gyun	Jo Yoo-jin	February 22, 2025
4	"Error of Statistics"; Transliteration: "Tonggye-ui oryu" (Korean: 통계의 오류)	Kim Tae-gyun	Jo Yoo-jin	February 23, 2025
5	"The Law of Death"; Transliteration: "Jug-eum-ui beopchik" (Korean: 죽음의 법칙)	Kim Tae-gyun	Jo Yoo-jin	March 1, 2025
6	"Means and Methods"; Transliteration: "Sudangwa bangbeop" (Korean: 수단과 방법)	Kim Tae-gyun	Jo Yoo-jin	March 2, 2025
7	"Data Validation"; Transliteration: "De-ito geomjeung" (Korean: 데이토 검증)	Kim Tae-gyun	Jo Yoo-jin	March 8, 2025
8	"Lee Dong-jin"; Transliteration: "I Dongjin" (Korean: 이동진)	Kim Tae-gyun	Jo Yoo-jin	March 9, 2025
9	"Shine On You"	Kim Tae-gyun	Jo Yoo-jin	March 15, 2025
10	"The Last Variable"; Transliteration: "Majimak byeonsu" (Korean: 마지막 변수)	Kim Tae-gyun	Jo Yoo-jin	March 16, 2025

== Production and release ==
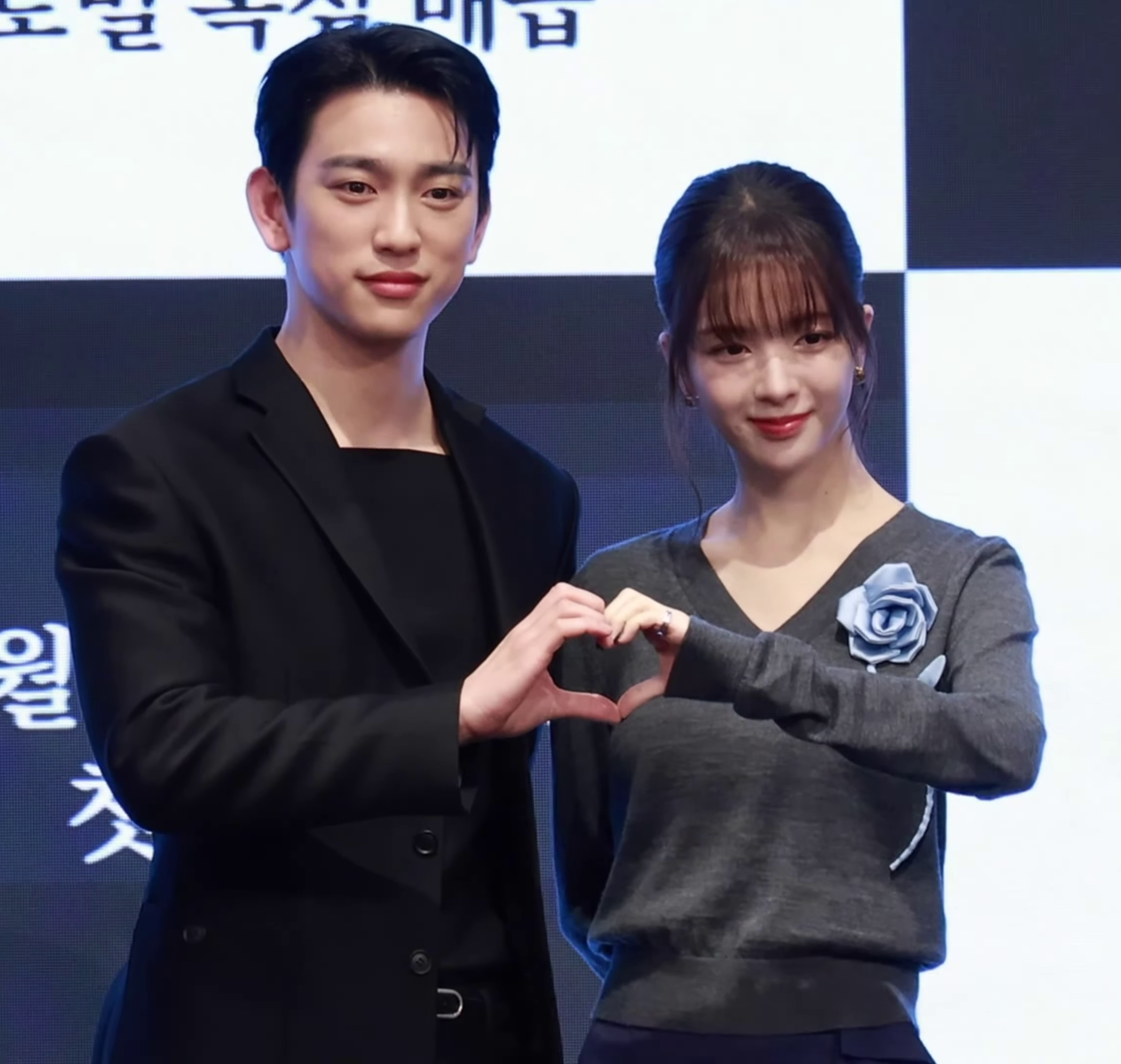
Main leads Park Jin-young and Roh Jeong-eui at the series' press conference.

The series is based on the webtoon The Witch by Kang Full. It is written by Jo Yoo-jin and directed by Kim Tae-gyun, who stated that he felt a certain affinity with the perspective and worldview of Kang Full's works; in particular, he was interested in The Witch because it addresses both the love story between a man and a woman, as well as important social issues, such as witch hunts and the social stigma created by prejudice and hatred. Having had to adapt a thirty-chapter work into a ten-episode television series, the script tried to fill the holes of the webtoon, and half of the episodes are dedicated to depicting the two leads, the interpersonal relationships surrounding them, and the reason why Lee Dong-jin started data-mining Park Mi-jeong; furthermore, the story is told from the perspective of the two rather than Joong-hyuk's.

On April 28, 2022, it was reported that Park Jin-young and Roh Jeong-eui were in discussion to play the series' leads. Principal photography began in August 2022 and wrapped up in March 2023. The main set was built in Chuncheon, while part of the last episode was filmed in Hallstatt, Austria.

The Witch premiered on Channel A on February 15, 2025.

== Original soundtrack ==
=== Part 1 ===
Released on February 22, 2025
No.	Title	Lyrics	Music	Artist	Length
1.	"Close My Eyes"	Jung Min-kyung; In-woo	Hwang Myung-heum; In-woo	Dahye	3:32
2.	"Close My Eyes" (Inst.)		Hwang Myung-heum; In-woo		3:32
Total length:					7:04

=== Part 2 ===
Released on March 1, 2025
No.	Title	Lyrics	Music	Artist	Length
1.	"But I Love You" (그래도 사랑이라고)	In-woo	In-woo	Choi Ingyeong	4:44
2.	"But I Love You" (그래도 사랑이라고) (Inst.))		In-woo		4:44
Total length:					9:28

=== Part 3 ===
Released on March 8, 2025
No.	Title	Lyrics	Music	Artist	Length
1.	"Don't Get Away From Me" (멀어지지 마)	In-woo	In-woo	Park Jang-hyun	3:41
2.	"Don't Get Away From Me" (멀어지지 마) (Inst.))		In-woo		3:41
Total length:					7:22

== Reception ==
=== Critical response ===
Both audiences and critics praised Park Jin-young and Roh Jeong-eui. They highlighted how Park Jin-young's deep emotional acting and subtle changes in expression conveyed Dong-jin's emotions and captured his earnest desire to save a person. In particular, Kim Seo-hyun of 100 News wrote "Park Jin-young worked his magic to make even Dong-jin's clumsy and immature appearance into a character that we can empathize with." Roh was complimented for her delicate portrayal of Mi-jeong's inner side and the gradual change that leads her to come into the world.

The Witch has received positive reviews for its message: according to Han Soo-jin, Kang Full's unique sensibility is well-rooted in the TV series, which, through a meticulous connection of the scenes, reaches the viewers' hearts and makes them reflect on social prejudice. Ultimately, the series is "a mirror reflecting the society that made us believe in curses. And in that mirror, it reminds us of the value of consideration and tolerance that we have forgotten, and the courage of one person to save another." For Cineplay, "the drama makes us reflect on how easily we internalize prejudice and take unfounded fears as truth; but, at the same time, it emphasizes that breaking that prejudice and moving forward is also a human power."

Opinions on the adaptation were mixed. For some, the series is a well-crafted mystery romance narrating of a pure love that saves, and that lyrically and affectionately depicts the prejudice and loneliness experienced by a woman with interesting developments rejecting any clichés; for others, it features unconvincing characters, including a female lead who is more of a "background character in her own story," and a repetitive narrative structure. In this regard, pop culture critic Jung Deok-hyun felt that it would have been more appropriate to shorten the story into six episodes or a two-hour film. The "slow and long-winded" directing style has been identified as both a weakness and an advantage.

Regarding Lee Dong-jin's character, Lakshana N. Palat of Gulf News observed that his fascination in Mi-jeong teetered on obsession, while Jung Soo-jin of Biz Hankook appreciated that he did not try to approach her without her permission, but noted that his subsequent actions to help her were very much stalker-like. For Jeon Hyo-jin of The Dong-A Ilbo, the series tried to soften the problem, already present in the original work, and give it a sense of legitimacy by making the characters three-dimensional and adding persuasiveness to their actions.

=== Viewership ===
With a nationwide rating of 2.4%, The Witch recorded the highest ratings of a drama premiere in Channel A's history. In the Seoul Metropolitan Area, the first episode's rating was 2.6%, with a peak of 3.3%. The ratings reached and exceeded 3% by the fourth episode, peaking at episode 8. The series ended with a rating of 2.6%, which was considered disappointing compared to the performance of the previous drama, Check-in Hanyang, whose ratings had followed an upward curve ending with 4.2%.

On South Korean streaming services, The Witch ranked eighth in Netflix's February 10–16 weekly chart and repeatedly appeared in the daily top 20 of TVING's most-watched programs. In Asia, where it was distributed by the OTT platform Viu, the series ranked second among the most-watched programs in Indonesia and Thailand, third in Malaysia, and sixth in Singapore and Hong Kong in its first week of release.

The Witch : South Korea viewers per episode (thousands)

Season	Episode number									
Season	1	2	3	4	5	6	7	8	9	10
1	583	728	N/A	701	N/A	661	N/A	684	N/A	588

Source: Audience measurement performed nationwide by Nielsen Korea.

Average TV viewership ratings
Ep.	Original broadcast date	Average audience share (Nielsen Korea)	
Ep.	Original broadcast date	Nationwide	Seoul
1	February 15, 2025	2.425% (5th)	2.632% (3rd)
2	February 16, 2025	2.974% (3rd)	2.802% (3rd)
3	February 22, 2025	1.7% (12th)	N/A
4	February 23, 2025	2.940% (3rd)	3.100% (1st)
5	March 1, 2025	1.5% (16th)	N/A
6	March 2, 2025	2.843% (4th)	2.486% (4th)
7	March 8, 2025	1.2% (17th)	N/A
8	March 9, 2025	3.073% (2nd)	3.185% (2nd)
9	March 15, 2025	1.3% (19th)	1.537% (10th)
10	March 16, 2025	2.629% (4th)	2.377% (6th)
Average		2.258%	— (Note: Due to multiple unpublished ratings, the exact average rating is unknown.)
In the table above, the blue numbers represent the lowest ratings and the red numbers represent the highest ratings.; N/A denotes ratings that were not published.; This drama aired on a cable channel/pay TV which normally has a relatively smaller audience compared to free-to-air TV/public broadcasters (KBS, SBS, MBC, and EBS).

== Awards and nominations ==
Award ceremony	Year	Category	Recipient	Result	Ref.
Baeksang Arts Awards	2025	Best New Actress – Television	Roh Jeong-eui	Nominated	
Korea Drama Awards	2025	Best New Actress	Roh Jeong-eui	Nominated	
Korea Drama Awards	2025	Excellence Award	Park Jin-young	Nominated	
