= My Perfect Stranger =

2023 South Korean television series

- Promotional poster
- Also known as: Run Into You; A Chance Encounter
- Hangul: 어쩌다 마주친, 그대
- Lit.: Met You by Chance
- RR: Eojjeoda majuchin, geudae
- MR: Ŏtchŏda majuch'in, kŭdae
- Genre: Fantasy; Mystery; Romance
- Written by: Baek So-yeon
- Directed by: Kang Soo-yeon; Lee Woong-hee
- Starring: Kim Dong-wook; Jin Ki-joo
- Music by: Gaemi
- Country of origin: South Korea
- Original language: Korean
- No. of episodes: 16

Production
- Executive producer: Yoon Jae-hyuk
- Producers: Ahn Chang-hyun; Lee Seung-bum
- Running time: 70 minutes
- Production company: Arc Media

Original release
- Network: KBS2
- Release: May 1 – June 20, 2023

My Perfect Stranger (Korean: 어쩌다 마주친, 그대) is a 2023 South Korean television series starring Kim Dong-wook and Jin Ki-joo. It depicts the strange and beautiful time travel of two people who get trapped in the year 1987. It aired on KBS2 from May 1 to June 20, 2023, every Monday and Tuesday at 21:45 (KST). It is also available for streaming on Kocowa, Viki and Viu in selected regions.

== Synopsis ==
A man, who seeks the truth behind a serial murder case, and a woman, who wants to prevent the marriage of her parents, realize that their goals are connected.

== Cast ==
=== Main ===
- Kim Dong-wook as Yoon Hae-jun
  - Kim Do-jin as young Hae-jun

a news anchor, who has a cool and straightforward personality.

- Jin Ki-joo as Baek Yoon-young
  - Nam Koong-lin as young Yoon-young

an editor at a publishing company.

=== Supporting ===
==== Soon-ae and the people around her in 1987 ====
- Seo Ji-hye as Lee Soon-ae: a third-year student at Woojung High School, who loves literature and has bright and positive personality.
- Park Soo-young as Lee Hyung-man: Soon-ae's father, who runs a tea house in Woojung Village.
- Kim Jung-young as Park Ok-ja: Soon-ae's mother.
- Hong Na-hyun as Lee Kyung-ae: Soon-ae's older sister, who works at a hair salon.
- Song Seung-hwan as Lee Oh-bok: Soon-ae's younger brother.

==== Hee-seop and the people around him in 1987 ====
- Lee Won-jung as Baek Hee-seop
  - Jo Yeon-ho as young Hee-seop

a charming third-year student at Woojung High School, who is simple and lively.

- Choi Young-woo as Baek Dong-sik: Hee-seop' uncle, who is a homicide detective at Woojung Police Station.
- Hong Seung-an as Baek Yoo-seop
  - Yoo Sung-min as teen Yoo-seop

Hee-seop's second older brother, who is a student at a prestigious university in Seoul.

==== People in Woojung Village in 1987 ====
- Kim Jong-soo as Yoon Byung-gu: the principal and chairman of Woojung High School, and Hae-jun's grandfather.
- Jung Jae-kwang as Yoon Yeon-woo: Byung-gu's son and Hae-jun's father, who is a mechanical engineering student returning from a long study abroad in the United States.
  - Son Jin-hwan as old Yeon-woo
- Jung Shin-hye as Lee Cheong-ah: the owner of Bongbong Cafe and Hae-jun's mother.
- Ji Hye-won as Go Mi-suk: Soon-ae's classmate.
- Kim Yeon-woo as Go Min-su: Mi-suk's older brother.
- Joo Yeon-woo as Yoo Beom-ryong: Hee-seop's classmate.
- Kim Ye-ji as Kim Hae-kyung: Soon-ae's classmate.
- Kwon So-hyun as Lee Eun-ha: Soon-ae's classmate.
- Kang Ji-woon as Park Yu-ri: Soon-ae's classmate.
- Jung Ga-hee as Lee Joo-young: a teacher at Woojung High School.

==== People in 2021 ====
- Lee Ji-hyun as Lee Soon-ae: Yoon-young's mother.
- Lee Gyu-hoe as Baek Hee-seop: Yoon-young's father.
- Kim Hye-eun as Go Mi-suk: a best-selling author.

=== Extended ===
- Kim Hyun-mok as Jeon Young-nok
- Lim Jong-yoon as Min-su (in 2021)
- Jang Seo-won as Gyo-ryeon

=== Special appearance ===
- Jung Jin-young as Hae-jun and Yoon-young's son

== Production and release ==
The first script reading of the cast was held in April 2022.

My Perfect Stranger was initially scheduled for release in the second half of 2022. In November 2022, it was confirmed that the series would premiere on KBS2's Wednesdays and Thursdays time slot in January 2023. However, on January 6, 2023, KBS announced that the premiere of My Perfect Stranger was again pushed back to May 2023 and would air on Mondays and Tuesdays time slot instead.

== Viewership ==
My Perfect Stranger : South Korea viewers per episode (thousands)

Season	Episode number																Average
Season	1	2	3	4	5	6	7	8	9	10	11	12	13	14	15	16	Average
1	911	822	670	707	677	675	707	778	748	699	702	738	724	804	718	916	750

Source: Audience measurement performed nationwide by Nielsen Korea.

Average TV viewership ratings
Ep.	Original broadcast date	Average audience share		
Ep.	Original broadcast date	Nielsen Korea		TNmS
Ep.	Original broadcast date	Nationwide	Seoul	Nationwide
1	May 1, 2023	4.5% (13th)	4.2% (12th)	3.8% (15th)
2	May 2, 2023	4.2% (12th)	4.2% (9th)	3.9% (15th)
3	May 8, 2023	4.0% (13th)	4.2% (13th)	N/A
4	May 9, 2023	4.3% (11th)	4.3% (8th)	N/A
5	May 15, 2023	3.8% (15th)	3.6% (13th)	N/A
6	May 16, 2023	4.0% (11th)	3.7% (10th)	N/A
7	May 22, 2023	4.2% (13th)	4.5% (8th)	N/A
8	May 23, 2023	4.7% (8th)	5.0% (5th)	N/A
9	May 29, 2023	4.6% (14th)	4.7% (10th)	N/A
10	May 30, 2023	4.6% (9th)	5.2% (6th)	N/A
11	June 5, 2023	4.5% (10th)	4.8% (7th)	N/A
12	June 6, 2023	4.6% (7th)	4.9% (5th)	N/A
13	June 12, 2023	4.5% (10th)	4.8% (8th)	N/A
14	June 13, 2023	4.5% (9th)	4.9% (6th)	N/A
15	June 19, 2023	4.4% (12th)	4.8% (8th)	N/A
16	June 20, 2023	5.7% (6th)	6.2% (4th)	3.3% (15th)
Average		4.4%	4.6%	— (Note: Due to some unpublished ratings, the exact average rating is unknown.)
In the table above, the blue numbers represent the lowest ratings and the red numbers represent the highest ratings.; N/A denotes ratings that were not published.
