= The First Night with the Duke =

2025 South Korean television series

- Promotional poster
- Hangul: 남주의 첫날밤을 가져버렸다
- Lit.: I Took the Male Lead's First Night
- RR: Namjuui cheonnalbameul gajeo beoryeotda
- MR: Namjuŭi ch'ŏnnalpamŭl kajŏ pŏryŏtta
- Genre: Romance; Fantasy
- Based on: The First Night With the Duke by Hwang Do-tol
- Written by: Jeon Seon-young
- Directed by: Lee Woong-hee
- Starring: Seohyun; Ok Taec-yeon; Kwon Han-sol; Seo Bum-june; Ji Hye-won
- Music by: Gaemi
- Country of origin: South Korea
- Original language: Korean
- No. of episodes: 12

Production
- Running time: 60 minutes
- Production companies: Studio N; Monster Union

Original release
- Network: KBS2
- Release: June 11 – July 17, 2025

The First Night with the Duke (Korean: 남주의 첫날밤을 가져버렸다) is a 2025 South Korean television series starring Seohyun, Ok Taec-yeon, Kwon Han-sol, Seo Bum-june, and Ji Hye-won. The series depicts the story of an ordinary college student's soul taking possession of the body of a minor character in a romance novel. It aired on KBS2 from June 11, to July 17, 2025, every Wednesday and Thursday at 21:50 (KST).

The show is available on Viu in selected regions.

== Synopsis ==
A contemporary college student, known as "K", awakens unexpectedly inside her beloved historical romance book, upending her normal existence. Cha Seon-chaek, a minor noble character in the novel, is the person she has transmigrated into. Seon-chaek hails from a wealthy family and at first aspires to a simple, tranquil life, intending to watch the novel's plot unfold from the sidelines before eventually resuming her own life. But when she meets Lee Beon, the chilly, attractive, and seemingly compulsive male protagonist of the book, by chance while intoxicated, her intentions are utterly upended. Favoured by the King, Beon is a prince with royal ancestry who excels in martial arts. He has a tragic history as well. After this unanticipated "first night", Beon grows infatuated with Seon-chaek and demands to wed her. Given that Beon was meant to fall in love with Jo Eun-ae, the original female lead, this completely upends the plot of the original novel. Seon-chaek, still possessed by K, tries desperately to steer Beon back towards Eun-ae and restore the original plot, but no matter how hard she tries, Beon's affection consistently returns to her.

== Cast ==
=== Main ===
- Seohyun as Cha Seon-chaek / K

She is a supporting character who appears only in a single line in the protagonist's favorite novel; the second, a young woman who, due to an unfortunate incident, dropped out of university and whose only hobby in her grim daily life was reading a historical web novel. She is the original Ripley de Liverpool's counterpart.

- Ok Taec-yeon as Lee Beon, Gyeongseong-gun

He is the king's favorite nephew and the male protagonist of this world. He believes that if two people have spent their first night together, they should take responsibility for each other. He is the original Zeronis Inglide's counterpart.

- Kwon Han-sol as Jo Eun-ae, she is the true female protagonist of the novel.
  - Yoon Chae-na took on the role of young Eun-ae.
- Seo Bum-june as Jung Soo-gyeom

He is the youngest member of Hongmungwan, the son of a prestigious and highly educated family, and the epitome of the upright and caring male lead. Gyeongseong-gun's only friend.

- Ji Hye-won as Do Hwa-seon

She is a villain, who exacerbates the complex relationship between characters.

- Lee Tae-sun as Lee Gyu, Seonghyeon-gun

He is another nephew of the king.

=== Supporting ===
==== Seon-chaek's Family ====
- Seo Hyun-chul as Cha Ho-yeol, Seon-chaek's father and Deok-jeong's husband. He is an upright subject who does not hesitate to speak frankly even in front of the king for the good of the country.
- Yoon Yoo-sun as Yoon Deok-jeong, the lady of the Cha family, mother of Seon-chaek and wife of Ho-yeol. She is a dignified and tidy woman, but she never loses her strength in the face of a crisis, as evidenced when a man rumored to be her daughter's matchmaker appears.
- Lee Sang-woon as Cha Jang-ho, older brother by Cha Seon-chaek, Du-ho and Se-ho; eldest son of Ho-yeol and Deok-jeong.
- Kim Shin-bi as Cha Du-ho, the medicine-obsessed second son of the Cha family.
- Yoon Jung-hoon as Cha Se-ho, the third son of the Cha family, an unpredictable eccentric with a warm, caring brotherly side.
- Oh Se-eun as Bang-ul, a servant with high-level secretarial skills who follows Seon-chaek's every move.

==== Others ====
- Song Young-jae as Haengrang-a-beom, a loyal servant of Gyeongseong-gun for many years.
- Yoon Tae-ha as Ma-yoon, a loyal follower and confidant of Gyeongseong-gun, to whom he swore loyalty. Following his orders, he pursues the mastermind behind the Black Death Group, a force that threatens the royal family.
- Joo Suk-tae as Seol-jong, the king in the novel, who was not originally in line to succeed to the throne and came to it after a purge.
- Nam Gi-ae as Queen Dowager (Dae-bi), the former king's first wife, when her only son, the crown prince, died, a bloody storm erupted in the royal family.
- Jung Hee-tae as Prime Minister Do Bae-myeong, brother-in-law of the Queen Dowager, father of Hwa-seon, for whom he is always worried.
- Jung Ho-bin as Jeong Moon-seok, a royal secretary according to the long-standing tradition of his prestigious family. He is conservative and controlling, and always disgruntled with his free-spirited son, Soo-gyeom.
- Kim Young-woong as Jo Byeong-mu, a wealthy merchant who took Eun-ae in, saved her life, and made her his adopted daughter, and whose businesses benefited from her cunning.
- Park Jeong-eon as the Queen Dowager’s head court lady (Ji Mil-sang-gung).
- Lee Joo-won as Kkoma, a mysterious boy who appears in every dramatic moment Seon-chaek encounters.
- Justin John Harvey as Mark/the Westerner

=== Special appearance ===
- Kim Ah-young as Seol-gi, a shaman Seon-chaek often visits.

== Episodes ==
No.	Title	Original release date
1	"Episode 1"	June 11, 2025
When I opened my eyes, I woke up as a minor character in a novel, the daughter of the Prime Minister, Seon-chaek (played by Seohyun)! For the time being, I plan to enjoy the luxurious life of a noblewoman and watch the heartbreaking romance between the male and female protagonists, Lee Beon (played by Ok Taecyeon) and Eun-ae (played by Kwon Han-sol), but for some reason, things are going differently from the original...
2	"Episode 2"	June 12, 2025
Unlike the original, the romance circuit of 'Lee Beon' is not directed towards 'Eun-ae (played by Kwon Han-sol)', but only towards 'Seon-chaek (played by Seohyun).' As the villainess 'Hwa-seon (played by Ji Hye-won)' begins to target her, 'Seon-chaek' soon goes beyond a supporting role...
3	"Episode 3"	June 18, 2025
'Seon-chaek (played by Seo Hyun)' tries to put the novel back on track by setting up a love triangle with the help of her sub-boyfriend 'Soo-gyeom (played by Seo Beom-jun)s Seonmunhoe, but the plan starts to go wrong and ends up only adding fuel to the fire of 'Lee-beons (played by Ok Taec-yeon) unlit heart...
4	"Episode 4"	June 19, 2025
The whole city is in an uproar over the news of the marriage between 'Lee Beon (played by Ok Taecyeon)' and the young lady of the state council, 'Seon-chaek (played by Seo Hyun)'. However, Lee Beon's only friend, 'Soo-gyeom (played by Seo Beom-jun)', comes to see 'Seon-chaek' and confesses his secret feelings...
5	"Episode 5"	June 25, 2025
Seon-chaek (Seo Hyun), who has decided to stake her true heart and destiny on Lee Beon (Ok Taecyeon), wants to challenge Lee Beon in the Samgan-taek of Gyeongseong-gun. Meanwhile, Soo-gyeom (Seo Beom-jun) receives the shocking news that Eun-ae (Kwon Han-sol) has been selected for the Samgan-taek...
6	"Episode 6"	June 26, 2025
'Lee Byun (played by Ok Taecyeon)' begins to question the royal family's involvement in his marriage, and as he pursues the 'Queen Dowager (played by Nam Ki-ae)' and 'Hwa-seon (played by Ji Hye-won)' family, he gets one step closer to uncovering the truth behind the conspiracy. Meanwhile, 'Soo-gyeom's (played by Seo Beom-joon) love for 'Eun-ae' (played by Kwon Han-sol) grows deeper by the day...
7	"Episode 7"	July 2, 2025
With the confession of love from Seon-chaek (played by Seo Hyun), Lee-beon (played by Ok Taec-yeon) becomes happier than ever. However, Seong-hyeon-gun Lee-gyu (played by Lee Tae-sun) appears in the city and provokes Lee-beon. Meanwhile, Su-gyeom (played by Seo Beom-joon), who realizes that love is something to be won, finally decides to tell Eun-ae (played by Kwon Han-sol) his true feelings...
8	"Episode 8"	July 3, 2025
'Seon-chaek (Seo Hyun)' and 'Lee-beon (Ok Taec-yeon)' suddenly become a Joseon version of Romeo and Juliet after being met with the strong opposition of 'Ho-yeol (Seo Hyun-chul)'. Meanwhile, 'Wang (Joo Suk-tae)' proposes a dangerous confrontation using the reunion of his two nephews 'Lee-beon' and 'Lee-gyu (Lee Tae-sun)' as an excuse...
9	"Episode 9"	July 9, 2025
In order to lead the government troops to find the missing 'Seon-chaek (Seo Hyun)', 'Lee-beon (Ok Taecyeon)' incurs the wrath of 'King (Joo Suk-tae)' and faces his fate of living as a royal hunting dog once again. The appearance of 'Lee Gyu (Lee Tae-seon)', a variable that did not appear in the original work, begins to shake up the lives of 'Seon-chaek', 'Lee-beon', 'Eun-ae (Kwon Han-sol)', and 'Soo-gyeom (Seo Beom-joon)' in an unexpected way...
10	"Episode 10"	July 10, 2025
As the body of the unknown man who kidnapped 'Seon-chaek (played by Seo Hyun)' surfaced, an uncomfortable atmosphere began to spread between 'Lee-beon (played by Ok Taec-yeon)' and 'Seon-chaek.' Meanwhile, 'Hwa-seon (played by Ji Hye-won)' begins to doggedly pursue the truth of the kidnapping case in order to prove her innocence...

== Original soundtrack ==
=== Part 1 ===
Released on June 12, 2025
No.	Title	Lyrics	Music	Artist	Length
1.	"BamBamBam" (밤밤밤)	Glen Choi; Tyler Thang Xue Xun; Park Han-dam; Strongman; Son Yo-seop	X-CHILD; Glen Choi; Bell (Kiss of Life)	Rescene	3:21
2.	"BamBamBam" (밤밤밤 (Inst.))		X-CHILD; Glen Choi; Bell (Kiss of Life)		3:21
Total length:					6:42

=== Part 2 ===
Released on June 19, 2025
No.	Title	Lyrics	Music	Artist	Length
1.	"How About we Start our Love?" (우리 시작할까요)	CHANRAN; Kim Yeong-seong	Kim Yeong-seong; 5TALENT; CHANRAN	Hui, Boramiyu	3:18
2.	"How About we Start our Love?" (우리 시작할까요 (Inst.))		Kim Yeong-seong; 5TALENT; CHANRAN		3:18
Total length:					6:36

=== Part 3 ===
Released on June 26, 2025
No.	Title	Lyrics	Music	Artist	Length
1.	"The Way You Look at Me" (그대가 나를 바라보면)	Gaemi; Hanbam (Midnight)	Gaemi; Hanbam (Midnight)	Bumjin	4:00
2.	"The Way You Look at Me" (그대가 나를 바라보면 (Inst.))		Gaemi; Hanbam (Midnight)		4:00
Total length:					8:00

=== Part 4 ===
Released on July 3, 2025
No.	Title	Lyrics	Music	Artist	Length
1.	"The Way You Look at Me" (언제나 그대라서)	Hanbam (Midnight)	Gaemi; Hanbam (Midnight)	Ben	3:56
2.	"The Way You Look at Me" (언제나 그대라서 (Inst.))		Gaemi; Hanbam (Midnight)		3:56
Total length:					7:52

== Production ==
=== Development ===
The series is written by Jeon Seon-young, directed by Lee Woong-hee, and co-produced by Studio N and Monster Union. It is based on the original Naver web novel series of the same name by Hwang Do-tol.

=== Casting ===
According to an interview with Xports News on July 26, 2024, Ok Taecyeon and Seohyun were considering the lead roles. On November 19, Ji Hye-won was confirmed to join the cast. On the same day, Seo Bum-june was also confirmed to participate. Then, on November 28, Seohyun, Ok, Kwon Han-sol, Seo, and Ji were confirmed to appear.

=== Incidents during shooting ===
As of November 28, 2024 the series was in shooting phase. While filming, Seohyun suffered an accident to a leg that forced her to carry a cane for a while: with it she went to present the KBS Drama Awards on December 31, 2024.

The day before, on December 30, 2024, architect Min Seo-hong visited Byeongsan Seowon, a Confucian academy in the vicinity of Andong where the series was being shot. Three days after his visit, he posted on his Facebook page that he had witnessed how the technical staff was damaging this historic site, declared a UNESCO World Heritage List, by fixing some ten streetlights with nails on the pillars. He later discovered that the Cultural Heritage Division of Andong City Hall had granted permission to film, but was unaware they were causing damage. The Korean Broadcasting System apologized after its staff hammered five nails into the complex's Mandaeru Pavilion to hang lanterns as part of shooting for a drama production. Subsequently, the city of Andong sued KBS for damaging cultural heritage and requested the destruction of all scenes shot in Byeongsan Seowon, before which the channel dismissed them. The incident likewise had criminal consequences for KBS staff. On February 10, 2025 the Gyeongbuk Andong Police Department announced that it had reported to the prosecutor's office three members of the utility team, accused of violating the Cultural Heritage Preservation and Utilization Act. Following this incident, the National Heritage Administration announced on the 20th the preparation of theStandard Guidelines for Filming Permits in Nationally Designated Cultural Heritage Sites with which it is proposed to discipline use in future film or television shoots and prevent damage to heritage sites cultural. On June 11, a press conference to introduce the production was held in Sindorim, Seoul, attended by director Lee Woong-hee and actors Seohyun, Ok Taecyeon, Kwon Han-sol, Seo Beom-jun, and Ji Hye-wo. During the conference, the director apologized again for the damage caused to the Byeongsan Seowon historical site during filming and confirmed that scenes filmed there had been canceled.

== Viewership ==
The First Night with the Duke : South Korea viewers per episode (thousands)

Season	Episode number											
Season	1	2	3	4	5	6	7	8	9	10	11	12
1	532	579	463	639	N/A	608	N/A	N/A	466	427	N/A	542

Source: Audience measurement performed nationwide by Nielsen Korea.

Average TV viewership ratings
Ep.	Original broadcast date	Average audience share (Nielsen Korea)	
Ep.	Original broadcast date	Nationwide	Seoul
1	June 11, 2025	3.3% (15th)	2.7% (19th)
2	June 12, 2025	3.4% (11th)	2.7% (17th)
3	June 18, 2025	2.7% (17th)	2.5% (18th)
4	June 19, 2025	3.3% (12th)	3.1% (13th)
5	June 25, 2025	2.6% (18th)	N/A
6	June 26, 2025	3.3% (12th)	3.4% (9th)
7	July 2, 2025	2.7% (15th)	2.5% (19th)
8	July 3, 2025	2.7% (20th)	N/A
9	July 9, 2025	2.8% (17th)	2.5% (19th)
10	July 10, 2025	2.7% (19th)	2.6% (18th)
11	July 16, 2025	2.6% (NR)	N/A
12	July 17, 2025	3.2% (17th)	2.8% (17th)
Average		2.9%	— (Note: Due to multiple unpublished ratings, the exact average rating is unknown.)
In the table above, the blue numbers represent the lowest ratings and the red numbers represent the highest ratings.; N/A denotes ratings that were not published.
