= Roh Jeong-eui =

South Korean actress (born 2001)

- Roh at the 31st Busan International Film Festival in 2026
- Born: July 31, 2001 (age 25); Seongnam, South Korea
- Education: Hanyang University
- Occupation: Actress
- Years active: 2011–present
- Agent: Namoo Actors

Korean name
- Hangul: 노정의
- Hanja: 盧正義
- RR: No Jeongui
- MR: No Chŏngŭi
- Website: namooactors.com

Roh Jeong-eui (Korean: 노정의; born July 31, 2001) is a South Korean actress. She is known for her roles in the film Phantom Detective (2016), 18 Again (2020), Our Beloved Summer (2021–2022), and Hierarchy (2024).

== Early life and education ==
Roh was born on July 31, 2001 in Bundang District, Seongnam, South Korea.

Roh entered the entertainment industry with the help of her older sister who is more than 9 years older. Roh went through 8 auditions and was selected to be a Kid Model. Her first TV appearance is Happy Time, Fantastic Mates in 2009.

In 2019, Namoo Actors announced Roh had been accepted and will be a member of Hanyang University's class of 2020 in the Department of Theater and Film.

== Career ==
=== 2010–2015: Beginning as a child actress ===
In 2010, Roh debuted as a child actress in episode 7 of the OCN drama Quiz of God, briefly appearing as the child counterpart of Hong Ju-yeon.

In 2011, Roh portrayed Lee Se-young's child counterpart in the Channel A drama Bachelor's Vegetable Store and Kim Sun-a's child counterpart in the SBS drama Scent of a Woman; she also played Na Ye-seul in her first movie I Am a Dad.

In 2012, Roh appeared in various dramas such as Dream High 2, Operation Proposal, Full House Take 2, The King's Doctor and Cheer Up, Mr. Kim!. Furthermore, this marked the first time she received nominations for Best Young Actress at both the KBS Drama Awards and the MBC Drama Awards in the same year.

On April 29, 2013, the entertainment agency Namoo Actors announced that they had signed an exclusive contract with her. After that, she appeared in the drama The Eldest as the younger version of Lee Ji-sook, a role portrayed by Oh Yoon-ah.

In 2014, Roh portrayed the child counterpart of Koo Hye-sun in Angel Eyes and Park Shin-hye in Pinocchio.

She took on her first leading role as "Roh Jeong-eui" in the Tooniverse children's drama Store Struck By Lightning Season 2. The drama series itself was highly popular among children, which significantly contributed to her gaining public recognition.

In 2015, Roh appeared in the action thriller film The Phone as Ko Kyung-rim, the daughter of Son Hyun-joo's and Uhm Ji-won's characters. She received a lot of praise for her performance as a child actress.

=== 2016–2019: Teenage and supporting role ===
In 2016, Roh gained attention for her role as Kim Dong-yi in the movie Phantom Detective starring Lee Je-hoon and she appeared in Flowers of the Prison as a teen counterpart of Kim Soo-yeon.

In 2017, Roh portrayed Oh Ha-ra in the drama Live Up to Your Name and appeared as a teen counterpart of Jung Ryeo-won, who played Ma Yi-deum in Witch at Court.

In 2018, Roh portrayed Bong Seon-hwa, a young student in a girls' school who falls in love with a senior in the movie Fantasy of the Girls.

The following year, she took on the roles of Kang Seul-gi in the OCN drama Kill It and Han Da-jung in the tvN drama The Great Show. She also starred in the independent film, A Haunting Hitchhike, the coming-of-age story of a 16-year-old girl searching for her mother who abandoned her after her father was diagnosed with terminal cancer. Her performance received widespread acclaim and touched audiences deeply.

=== 2020–present: Rise in popularity and leading role ===
In 2020, Roh portrayed the roles of the twins Yoo Soo-yeon and Yoo Jeong-yeon in the tvN one-act drama Drama Stage – Everyone Is There. Her performance, acclaimed for her portrayal of multiple personalities, also earned her recognition for her acting prowess.

In the same year, she played the role of Hong Shi-ah in the JTBC drama 18 Again. The drama received significant positive acclaim from the public, leading to increased recognition for her. She also appeared in the film The Day I Died: Unclosed Case as Jung Se-jin, a girl who is believed to have disappeared from a cliff during a storm after leaving a suicide note. For her performance, she was nominated for Best New Actress at the 42nd Blue Dragon Film Awards.

In 2021, Roh was cast in the role of Seo Ji-min, a popular cheerleader and famous student at Seoyeon University in the KBS drama Dear.M. In the same year, she took on the role of NJ, a top idol, in the SBS drama Our Beloved Summer. Due to a notable physical transformation, highlighted by a significant weight loss and a more mature appearance, she received great attention for her look and acting skill, winning the Best New Actress Award at the 2021 SBS Drama Awards.

From April 3, 2022 to April 2, 2023, Roh hosted the SBS music program Inkigayo alongside Tomorrow X Together's Yeonjun and Seo Beom-jun. In 2022 she also appeared in the movie I Want to Know Your Parents as Nam Ji-ho, a girl who witnesses a violent incident involving students and testifies in court.

In 2024, Roh starred in two Netflix projects. She appeared in the film Badland Hunters as Han Su-na and took on the lead role of Jung Jae-i, the eldest daughter of the Jaeyul Group, in the drama Hierarchy. The drama ranked second in Netflix's Global Top 10 TV (Non-English) category after three days of its release, topping the chart the following week with 48 million hours watched by 6.3 million viewers.

In 2025, Roh starred in the Channel A drama The Witch as Park Mi-jeong, which made her nominated for Baeksang Arts Awards for the first time in her career. In April, she led in MBC drama Crushology 101.

In 2026, Roh starred in tvN romantic-comedy Our Universe opposite Bae In-hyuk. She played Woo Hyun-jin, a high-achieving college graduate who unexpectedly became a guardian to her toddler nephew. She is also set to appear in Webtoon adaption series Pigpen and film Shaving.

== Filmography ==
=== Film ===
Year	Title	Role	Notes	Ref.
2011	I Am a Dad	Na Ye-seul		
2011	Gochibang: Our Ideal	Lee So-hee		
2015	The Phone	Go Kyung-rim		
2016	Phantom Detective	Kim Dong-i		
2018	Fantasy of the Girls	Bong Seon-hwa		
2019	A Haunting Hitchhike	Yoon Jeong-ae		
2020	The Day I Died: Unclosed Case	Jung Se-jin		
2022	I Want to Know Your Parents	Nam Ji-ho		
2024	Badland Hunters	Han Su-na	Netflix film	
TBA	Shaving	Su-yeon		

=== Television series ===
Year	Title	Role	Notes	Ref.
2010	Quiz of God	young Hong Ju-yeon		
2011	Scent of a Woman	young Lee Hyun-jae		
2011	Bachelor's Vegetable Store	young Han Tae-in		
2012	Dream High 2	Shin Hae-poong		
2012	Operation Proposal	Hahm Ee-seul		
2012	The King's Doctor	young Kang Ji-nyeong / Yeong-dal		
2012	Full House Take 2	young Jang Man-ok		
2012	Cheer Up, Mr. Kim!	Nam Song-ah		
2013	The Eldest	Lee Ji-sook		
2014	KBS Drama Special: "Pretty! Oh Man-bok"	Kwon Ha-eun	one act-drama	
2014	Angel Eyes	child Yoon Soo-wan		
2014	Store Struck By Lightning 2	Roh Jeong-eui		
2014	Pinocchio	young Choi In-ha		
2016	Flowers of the Prison	young Yoon Shin-hye		
2017	Live Up to Your Name	Oh Ha-ra		
2017	Witch at Court	teen Ma Yi-deum		
2019	Kill It	Kang Seul-gi		
2019	The Great Show	Han Da-jung		
2020	Drama Stage: "Everyone is There"	Yoo Soo-yeon / Yoo Jeong-yeon	Season 3 – one-act drama	
2020	18 Again	Hong Shi-ah		
2021–2022	Our Beloved Summer	NJ		
2022	Dear.M	Seo Ji-min		
2025	The Witch	Park Mi-jeong		
2025	Crushology 101	Ban Hee-jin / Bunny		
2025	To the Moon	Advertising Model	Special Cameo	
2026	Our Universe	Woo Hyun-jin		
2026	Make Me Tingle	Lee Yu-ri	Special Appearance	
TBA	Pigpen	Romi		

=== Web series ===
Year	Title	Role	Notes	Ref.
2024	Hierarchy	Jung Jae-i		

=== Hosting ===
Year	Title	Role	Notes	Ref.
2022–2023	Inkigayo	Host	with Seo Bum-june and Choi Yeon-jun	

=== Music video appearances ===
Year	Song title	Artist	Ref.
2022	"Invitation" (초대)	MeloMance	

== Discography ==
=== Soundtrack appearances ===
List of soundtrack appearances, showing year released, and name of the album
Title	Year	Album	Ref.
"Island" (Note: Credited as NJ)	2022	Our Beloved Summer OST Special	

== Accolades ==
=== Awards and nominations ===
Name of the award ceremony, year presented, category, nominee of the award, and the result of the nomination
Award ceremony	Year	Category	Nominee / Work	Result	Ref.
Baeksang Arts Awards	2025	Best New Actress – Television	The Witch	Nominated	
Blue Dragon Film Awards	2021	Best New Actress	The Day I Died: Unclosed Case	Nominated	
Brand of the Year Awards	2025	Rising Star Actress	Roh Jeong-eui	Won	
KBS Drama Awards	2012	Best Young Actress	Cheer Up, Mr. Kim!, Dream High 2	Nominated	
Korea Drama Awards	2025	Best New Actress	The Witch, Crushology 101	Nominated	
MBC Drama Awards	2012	Best Young Actress	The King's Doctor	Nominated	
MBC Drama Awards	2025	Best Couple Award	Roh Jeong-eui (with Lee Chae-min); Crushology 101	Nominated	
MBC Drama Awards	2025	Excellence Award, Actress in a Miniseries	Crushology 101	Nominated	
SBS Drama Awards	2021	Best New Actress	Our Beloved Summer	Won	
Wildflower Film Awards	2019	Best New Actor/Actress	Fantasy of the Girls	Nominated	

=== Listicles ===
Name of publisher, year listed, name of listicle, and placement
Publisher	Year	Listicle	Placement	Ref.
Cine21	2021	New Actress to watch out for in 2022	6th (Note: Tied with Go Min-si, Park Eun-bin, Keum Sae-rok, Joo Hyun-young, Park Gyu-young, Lee Soo-kyung, Roh Yoon-seo, Gong Seung-yeon, Lee Se-young, IU, Keum Sae-rok, Park Ji-hu, Han So-hee, Jung Ji-so, Bang Min-ah, Jeon Jong-seo, Moon Ga-young)	
Cine21	2024	New Actress to watch out for in 2024	4th	
Cine21	2025	New Actress to watch out for in 2025	4th	
