= Kwon Han-sol =

South Korean actress (born 1996)

- Born: Kwon Han-sol; 27 November 1996 (age 29); Seoul, South Korea
- Other name: Gwon Han-sol
- Occupation: Actress
- Years active: 2017–present
- Agent: 51K
- Known for: She Would Never Know; Extracurricular; Sh**ting Stars

Kwon Han-sol (Korean: 권한솔; born November 27, 1996) is a South Korean actress. She is known for her roles in dramas such as Miss Lee, She Would Never Know, Snowdrop, Extracurricular and Sh**ting Stars. She also appeared in movies The Battleship Island, Jo Pil-ho: The Dawning Rage, The Discloser and Emergency Declaration.

== Filmography ==
=== Television series ===
Year	Title	Role	Ref.
2019	Hotel del Luna	Kyung-ah	
2019	Miss Lee	Seo-eun	
2020	Extracurricular	Hye-min	
2020	Train	Lee Ji-young	
2020	School Strange Stories: Karma	Mi-jin	
2021	She Would Never Know	Do Ye-jin	
2021	Snowdrop	Han-na	
2022	Shooting Stars	Hong Bo-in	
2023	Delightfully Deceitful	Yeon Ho-jeong	
2023	Daily Dose of Sunshine	Jung Ha-ram	
2023	Moving	Ms. Kim	
2023	Doona!	Song Tae-rim	
2024	Flex X Cop	Lee Ye-seon	
2025	The Witch	Seo Da-eun	
2025	The First Night with the Duke	Cho Eun-ae	
2025	I Am a Running Mate	Cho Han-byul	
2025	Typhoon Family	Oh Mi-ho	

=== Film ===
Year	Title	Role	Notes	Ref.
2017	The Battleship Island	Joseon girl		
2017	Steel Rain	North Korean guide		
2018	The Discloser	Bank employee		
2019	Jo Pil-ho: The Dawning Rage	So-hee		
2019	Sub-zero Wind (영하의 바람)	Yeong-ha		
2022	Emergency Declaration	Gu Min-jung		
2022	Midnight Horror: Six Nights	Bok-nyeo	Segment: Hall	
2022	Gentleman	Lee Joo-young		
