= Kim Bo-yoon =

South Korean actress (born 2001)

- Born: Kim Go-eun; December 18, 2001 (age 24); Namyangju, South Korea
- Occupation: Actress
- Years active: 2013–present
- Agent: Jikim Entertainment

Korean name
- Hangul: 김보윤
- RR: Gim Boyun
- MR: Kim Poyun

Kim Bo-yoon (Korean: 김보윤; born December 18, 2001) is a South Korean actress. She is known for her roles in dramas such as Good Casting, Ms. Hammurabi, At Eighteen and All of Us Are Dead. She also appeared in movies The Battleship Island, Mr. Go, Love, Lies and Familyhood.

== Filmography ==
=== Film ===
Year	Title	Role	Ref.
2013	Happiness For Sale (미나문방구)	So-young	
2013	Mr. Go	Sunny	
2016	Love, Lies	Yawn senior	
2016	Familyhood	Ok Hee	
2017	The Battleship Island	Joseon girl	
2019	A Haunting Hitchhike (히치하이크)	Hyo-jung	
2020	Hotel Lake (호텔 레이크)	Seo Eun-kyung	
2022	Ditto	Yeo-reum	

=== Television series ===
Year	Title	Role	Ref.
2014	What Happens to My Family?	Young Kang Seo-wool	
2015	My Daughter, Geum Sa-wol	Kang Dal-rae	
2016	Night Light	Shin Song-mi	
2017	Black	Soo-jin	
2018	Ms. Hammurabi	Han Seo-yeon	
2019	At Eighteen	Kwon Da-huin	
2020	Good Casting	Nam Joo-yeon	
2022	All of Us Are Dead	Seo Hyo-ryung	
2022	The Sound of Magic	Kim So-hee	
2024	Captivating the King	Bun-young	
2026	The Remarried Empress	Lady Laura Talittal	

=== Web shows ===
Year	Title	Role	Ref.
2022	Young Actors' Retreat	Cast member	
