= A Haunting Hitchhike =

2017 South Korean film

- Theatrical release poster
- Hangul: 히치하이크
- RR: Hichihaikeu
- MR: Hich'ihaik'ŭ
- Directed by: Jeong Hee-jae
- Screenplay by: Jeong Hee-jae
- Produced by: Mun Jeong-min
- Starring: Roh Jeong-eui; Park Hee-soon; Kim Go-eun
- Cinematography: Chang U-yeong; Jang Woo-yong
- Edited by: Lee Young-lim
- Music by: Lee Min-whee
- Production company: BREATHE FILM
- Distributed by: MOVement
- Release dates: October 2017 (Busan); March 14, 2019
- Running time: 108 minutes
- Country: South Korea
- Language: Korean

A Haunting Hitchhike (Korean: 히치하이크; RR: Hichihaikeu) is a 2017 South Korean drama film directed and written by Jeong Hee-jae. The film starring Roh Jeong-eui, Park Hee-soon, and Kim Go-eun is about a 16-year-old, Jeong-ae sets out to find the mother who abandoned her and to fulfill her desire to be part of a family in the home of a man suspected of being her friend's biological father.

The film premiered in Busan International Film Festival in 2017 and was selected for the main competition section of the 43rd Seoul Independent Film Festival.

It was released in theaters on March 14, 2019.

== Synopsis ==
Sixteen-year-old Jeong-ae lives with her terminally ill father in a redevelopment area of Seoul. Having abandoned treatment, he tells her that life becomes easier when one stops trying to survive, but Jeong-ae refuses to accept his outlook and struggles to endure their hardships.

A letter arrives from the mother who left her long ago, and Jeong-ae believes that finding this long-lost mother may be her last hope. She sets out on a journey to contact her. Along the way, she meets a man she suspects may be her friend, Hyo-jeong's biological father and stays briefly at his home. Drawn to the warmth and security he offers, she realizes how deeply she longs for a protective father figure, something absent in her own life.

== Cast ==
=== Main ===
- Roh Jeong-eui as Yoon Jeong-ae
- Park Hee-soon as Kim Hyun-woong
- Kim Go-eun as Im Hyo-jeong

=== Supporting ===
- Kim Hak-sun as Yoon Young-ho
- Joo Hae-eun as Jung-eun
- Lee Seung-yeon as Young-ok
- Ryu Seong-rok as Soo-wan
- Lee Ja-ram as Seok-jeong

== Release ==
The film debuted in the Korean Cinema Today-Vision section at 22nd Busan International Film Festival in 2017.

The film was invited at 14th Eurasia International Film Festival and received the Special Jury Prize, becoming the first Korean movie to receive an award from this film festival.

== Box office ==
The film was released in theaters on March 14, 2019.

== Awards and nominations ==
Name of the award ceremony, year presented, category, nominee of the award, and the result of the nomination
Award ceremony	Year	Category	Nominee	Result	Ref.
Seoul International Women's Film Festival	2015	Audience Award	A Haunting Hitchhike	Won	
Lotte Creative Contest	2017	Grand Prize	A Haunting Hitchhike	Won	
Eurasia International Film Festival	2018	Special Jury Prize	A Haunting Hitchhike	Won	
