= Ji Hye-won =

South Korean actress (born 1998)

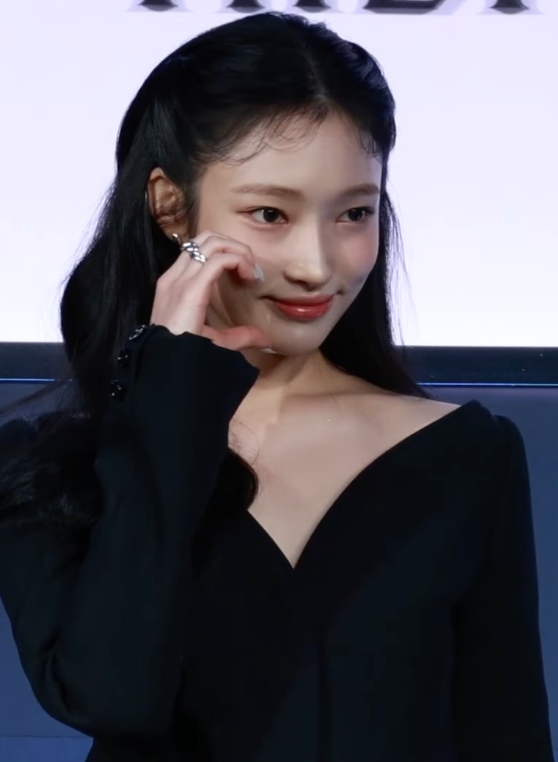
- Ji in June 2024
- Born: March 30, 1998 (age 28); Seoul, South Korea
- Other name: Chi Hye-won
- Education: Korea National University of Arts
- Occupation: Actress
- Years active: 2019–present
- Agent: Billions

Korean name
- Hangul: 지혜원
- RR: Ji Hyewon
- MR: Chi Hyewŏn

Ji Hye-won (Korean: 지혜원; born March 30, 1998) is a South Korean actress. She is known for her roles in dramas such as It's Okay to Not Be Okay (2020), The Sound of Magic (2022), My Perfect Stranger (2023), and Hierarchy (2024).

== Early life and education ==
Ji was interested in acting and thought about acting during her first year of high school, but her parents opposed her decision as they wanted her to study. Ji's grandparents were interested in arts and supported her decision. Later, she joined the English department and learned English until her senior year of high school. In her third year of high school, she went to an entrance exam cram school and studied for 7 to 8 months. After graduating from high school, Ji went to Korea National University of Arts and joined the acting department. After taking many acting lessons she joined KeyEast.

== Career ==
In 2019, Ji made her debut as an actress in Justice portraying the role of a rape victim named Jang Yeong-mi, for which she received positive reviews.

== Filmography ==
=== Television series ===
Year	Title	Role	Notes	Ref.
2019	Justice	Jang Yeong-mi		
2020	Dr. Romantic	Seo Se-young	Season 2	
2020	It's Okay to Not Be Okay	Lee Ah-reum		
2023	My Perfect Stranger	Go Mi-suk		
2025	The First Night with the Duke	Do Hwa-seon		

=== Web series ===
Year	Title	Role	Ref.
2022	The Sound of Magic	Baek Ha-na	
2024	Hierarchy	Yoon He-ra	
