= Kim Ye-ji (actress) =

South Korean actress (born 1997)

- Born: 6 April 1997 (age 28); Seoul, South Korea
- Other names: Kim Yi-ji
- Occupation: Actress
- Years active: 2017–present
- Agent: Awesome Ent
- Known for: School 2021; Love Alarm; My Perfect Stranger

Kim Ye-ji is a South Korean actress. She is known for her roles in dramas such as Love Alarm, Political Fever, School 2021, Go, Back Diary and My Perfect Stranger.

== Filmography ==
=== Television series ===
Year	Title	Role	Ref.
2017	Hello, My Twenties! 2	Ye-ji	
2021	School 2021	Jin Jin-soo	
2023	My Perfect Stranger	Kim Hae-kyung	
2023	Twinkling Watermelon	Lee Mi-ra	

=== Web series ===
Year	Title	Role	Ref.
2017	Yellow	Lee Yeo-reum	
2018	Go, Back Diary	Lee Hyun-bi	
2019	Wild Guys	Shin Yu-ri	
2019	Love Alarm	Sung Ji-yeon	
2020	The Temperature of Language: Our Nineteen	Woo Jin-seol	
2020	Goedam	Gossiping Student	
2021	Political Fever	Maeng So-dam	

=== Film ===
Year	Title	Role	Ref.
2019	The Divine Fury	Past Apostle	
