= Joo Hae-eun =

South Korean actress (born 1994)

- Born: Park So-young; January 17, 1994 (age 32); South Korea
- Other name: Ju Hae-eun
- Education: Hanyang University (Department of Philosophy)
- Occupations: Actress; model
- Years active: 2016–present
- Agent: Youborn Company
- Known for: Love with Flaws; Just Dance; Swing Kids

Korean name
- Hangul: 주해은
- RR: Ju Haeeun
- MR: Chu Haeŭn

Joo Hae-eun (Korean: 주해은; born January 17, 1994) is a South Korean actress and model. She is best known for her main role in Just Dance as Yang Na-young. She also appeared in movies such as Swing Kids, The Spy Gone North. She is also known for her supporting role in drama Love with Flaws as Lee Joo-hee.

== Filmography ==
=== Television series ===
Year	Title	Role	Ref.
2018	Just Dance	Yang Na-young	
2019	Love with Flaws	Lee Joo-hee	
2021	Start Up the Engine	Hae-eun	
2024	Hellbound Season 2	Jung Jin-su's mother	
2024	The Bequeathed	Yoon Myung-hee	

=== Film ===
Year	Title	Role	Ref.
2017	A Haunting Hitchhike	Jeong-eun	
2018	The Spy Gone North	North Korean agent	
2018	Swing Kids	Mae-hwa	
2020	Baseball Girl	Han Bang-geul	

=== Music video appearances ===
Year	Title	Artist
2016	"A signal of 1 billion light-years"	Lee Seung-hwan
