= Ye-ji (name) =

- Hangul: 예지
- RR: Yeji
- MR: Yeji

Ye-ji, also spelled Yea-ji, is a Korean given name.

== People with the given name ==
- Shin Yea-ji (figure skater born 1984), South Korean figure skater
- Shin Yea-ji (figure skater born 1988), South Korean figure skater
- Seo Yea-ji (born 1990), South Korean actress
- Kim Ye-ji (sport shooter) (born 1992), South Korean sport shooter
- Kwak Ye-ji (born 1992), South Korean archer
- Yaeji (born 1993), South Korean-American DJ
- Kim Ye-ji (rower) (born 1994), South Korean rower
- Yezi (born 1994), South Korean singer
- Seol Ye-ji (born 1996), South Korean curler
- Kim Ye-ji (actress) (born 1997), South Korean actress
- Jung Ye-ji (fl. 2015–present), South Korean actress
- Yeji (singer) (born 2000), South Korean singer

== See also ==
- List of Korean given names
