= Good News (2025 film) =

2025 film by Byun Sung-hyun

- Release poster
- Hangul: 굿뉴스
- RR: Gunnyuseu
- MR: Kunnyusŭ
- Directed by: Byun Sung-hyun
- Written by: Byun Sung-hyun; Lee Jin-seong
- Produced by: Han Hee-sung
- Starring: Sul Kyung-gu; Hong Kyung; Ryoo Seung-bum
- Cinematography: Jo Hyoung-rae
- Edited by: Kim Sang-bum
- Music by: Kim Hong-jip; Lee Jin-hee
- Production company: Star Platinum
- Distributed by: Netflix
- Release dates: September 5, 2025 (TIFF); October 17, 2025 (Netflix)
- Running time: 136 minutes
- Country: South Korea
- Languages: Korean; Japanese

Good News (Korean: 굿뉴스) is a 2025 South Korean black comedy film co-written and directed by Byun Sung-hyun for Netflix. The lead roles are played by Sul Kyung-gu, Hong Kyung and Ryoo Seung-bum. The film, inspired by the hijacking of a Japanese passenger plane in March 1970, follows a secret mission led by a committed team intent on safely bringing down a hijacked aircraft, employing whatever tactics the situation demands.

The film had its world premiere in the Special Presentations section of the 2025 Toronto International Film Festival on September 5, 2025. It was made available for global streaming on Netflix on October 17, 2025, following its festival release.

== Plot ==
In 1970, Japanese Ride Flight 351 is hijacked by armed members of Japan's Red Army Faction soon after taking off for Itazuke from Tokyo. The young hijackers, referring to themselves as Ashita no Joe, demand to be flown to Pyongyang, where they hope to form a Communist revolutionary army capable of toppling the Japanese government. Captain Takehiro Kubo points out that he and his copilot do not know Pyongyang's location or air traffic control frequency; he also misleads the hijackers about the plane's fuel level, claiming it is insufficient to make the trip. The hijackers allow the plane to land at Itazuke to refuel and obtain a map. Japanese authorities hesitate to take action out of fear of endangering the hostages, but the hijackers are prevailed upon to release the elderly, infirm, and children; ultimately, the plane is permitted to depart for Pyongyang with 106 Japanese hostages still aboard.

The Korean Central Intelligence Agency learns of the hijacking and Director Park Sang-hyeon tasks "Nobody", an undocumented North Korean defector and the KCIA's best fixer, with rescuing the hostages, hoping to reap international publicity and put the Japanese government in its debt. Nobody recruits ROK Air Force Lieutenant Seo Go-myung to assume the role of a North Korean air traffic controller and tricks the hijackers into landing the plane in Seoul. Despite attempts from the North Korean Air Force to intervene, Seo guides them to Gimpo International Airport.

At Gimpo, Nobody arranges for the airport to be disguised as Pyongyang International Airport. When Japanese Ride 351 arrives, the high-strung hijackers refuse to disembark after noticing several discrepancies, including American airliners and Louis Armstrong music playing over a local radio station. That night, Seo is sent to negotiate with the hijackers. One of the hijackers stabs the lead hijacker in the abdomen to demonstrate their resolve; the lead hijacker explains to Seo that if the plane does not resume its flight to Pyongyang before his death or the next day, they will detonate their bomb vest. Seeing that South Korean officials don't want to threaten the lives of the Japanese hostages if they send the plane to Pyongyang, Seo downplays the hijackers' fanaticism to his superiors. Nobody plants a false news report that one of the hostages is of Korean descent and draws comparisons to the 1969 Korean Air Lines YS-11 hijacking, igniting a public outcry for the hostages' immediate release that results in the deal obtaining the necessary presidential approval before the deadline. However, the hijackers reject the deal outright, believing it to be another ruse.

Nobody persuades Japanese Deputy Minister of Transportation Shinichi Ishida to offer himself as a hostage in exchange for the passengers' release. The hijackers accept, and after the swap, Japanese Ride 351 takes off for North Korea. Nobody divulges to Seo that although the minister and pilots were safely returned to Japan, the hijackers' guns and explosives turned out to be fake. Furthermore, South Korea initiates a cover-up and makes it appear as if the Japanese Ride 351 landed at Gimpo by mistake, preventing Seo from receiving recognition. Nobody assures Seo that he nonetheless accomplished something important and gives him a presidential watch as compensation. Nobody's reward is South Korean citizenship and a new name of his own choosing: Choi Go-myung.

== Cast ==
- Sul Kyung-gu as Nobody / Choi Go-myung
- Hong Kyung as Seo Go-myung, Air Force lieutenant
- Ryoo Seung-bum as Park Sang-hyeon, director of the Korean Central Intelligence Agency
- Takayuki Yamada as Shinichi Ishida, the Japan Deputy Minister of Transportation
- Shiro Sano as the Japanese Minister of Transportation.
- Kippei Shiina as Takahiro Kubo, flight Japanese Ride 351 captain
- Kim Sung-oh as Seigo Maeda, flight Japanese Ride 351 first officer
- Show Kasamatsu as Denji, the leader of the hijackers.
- Nairu Yamamoto as Asuka, the aircraft hijacker
- Hinata Hiiragi as Yuuki, the aircraft hijacker
- Choi Deok-moon as South Korea Minister of Defense
- Hyun Bong-sik as General Choi of the South Korea Air Force
- Yoon Kyung-ho as movie director
- Park Ji-hwan as Seo Go-myung's father
- Park Hae-soo as North Korea official
- Jeon Bae-soo as News director
- Seo Eun-soo as Anchorwoman
- Jeon Do-yeon as South Korea First Lady
- Choi Hyun-wook as Haneda Airport couple passenger
- Lee Yeon as Haneda Airport couple passenger

== Production ==
In May 2024, Hong Kyung was offered a role in the film.

In a press release issued in September 2024, Netflix officially announced that the film had entered production. Filming began on September 7, 2024, and finished by February 17, 2025.

Gimpo International Airport was made to look like Pyongyang International Airport for the filming.

== Release ==
Good News had its world premiere at the 2025 Toronto International Film Festival on September 5, 2025. It was also presented in the Gala Presentation at the 30th Busan International Film Festival on September 18, 2025.

Netflix planned a simultaneous global launch following the film’s world premiere at the Toronto International Film Festival. It is available to stream globally from October 17, 2025 on Netflix.

== Reception ==
Robert Daniels, writing for Screen Daily reviewing at TIFF described the film as "a biting satire about bureaucratic spinelessness." He praised the ensemble cast for delivering "fantastic, multi-layered performances," and commended the screenplay by Byun Sung-hyun and Lee Jin-seong. Daniels highlighted the clever use of the 1968 manga catchphrase Ashita no Joe: Fighting for Tomorrow by the nine hijackers, calling it a mark of "nimble" writing. Overall, he characterized the film as "a genre-mashing, tone-blending, thriller-comedy."

== Accolades ==
| Award | Date of ceremony | Category | Recipient(s) | Result | Ref. |
|---|---|---|---|---|---|
| Chunsa Film Art Awards | December 23, 2025 | Best Director in the OTT Film | Byun Sung-hyun | Won | |
| Chunsa Film Art Awards | December 23, 2025 | Film Directors' Choices for Best Actor | Sul Kyung-gu | Won | |
| Baeksang Arts Awards | May 8, 2026 | Best Film | Good News | Nominated | |
| Baeksang Arts Awards | May 8, 2026 | Best Director | Byun Sung-hyun | Nominated | |
| Baeksang Arts Awards | May 8, 2026 | Best Actor | Hong Kyung | Nominated | |
| Baeksang Arts Awards | May 8, 2026 | Best Supporting Actor | Ryoo Seung-bum | Nominated | |
| Baeksang Arts Awards | May 8, 2026 | Best Screenplay | Byun Sung-hyun and Lee Jin-seong | Won | |
| Baeksang Arts Awards | May 8, 2026 | Best Technical Achievement | Kim Sang-bum and Kim Ho-bin (Editing) | Nominated | |
| Buil Film Awards | October 7, 2026 | Best Director | Byun Sung-hyun | Nominated | |
| Buil Film Awards | October 7, 2026 | Best Cinematography | Cho Hyung-rae | Nominated | |
| Buil Film Awards | October 7, 2026 | Art/Technical Award | Han Ah-reum | Nominated | |
| Buil Film Awards | October 7, 2026 | Best Screenplay | Byun Sung-hyun and Lee Jin-seong | Won | |
| Korean Association of Film Critics Awards | November 4, 2026 | Best Screenplay | Byun Sung-hyun and Lee Jin-seong | Won | |
| Korean Association of Film Critics Awards | November 4, 2026 | Top 10 Films of the Year | Good News | Won | |
